= 2020–21 AFC Wimbledon season =

AFC Wimbledon
2020–21 season
- CEO: Joe Palmer
- Head coach: Glyn Hodges (until 30 January); Mark Robinson (from 30 January)
- Stadium: Loftus Road; Plough Lane
- League One: 19th
- FA Cup: Second round (eliminated by Crawley Town)
- EFL Cup: First round (eliminated by Oxford United)
- EFL Trophy: Quarter-finals (eliminated by Oxford United)
Home colours	Away colours	Third colours

The 2020–21 AFC Wimbledon season was the club's 19th season in their history and the fifth consecutive season in EFL League One. Along with League One, the club also participated in the FA Cup, EFL Cup and EFL Trophy. It was their first season based in their spiritual home of Wimbledon at the newly built Plough Lane stadium. They played at Loftus Road until the stadium was completed on 3 November. On Friday 6 November it was announced there had been a covid outbreak amongst the first team squad leading to the matches against Barrow in the FA Cup and the league fixture against Wigan being postponed. Over the weekend all members of the first team squad, staff and the U18s squad received covid testing and on Sunday the 8th it was announced the club would have to undergo a 2-week circuit breaker with all players and staff having to self isolate for 2 weeks.

The season covers the period from 1 July 2020 to 30 June 2021.

== Transfers ==
=== Transfers in ===
Date	Pos.	Nat.	Name	From	Fee	Ref.
23 July 2020	RB	(England)	Cheye Alexander	(England) Barnet	Free transfer	
6 August 2020	CM	(England)	Alex Woodyard	(England) Peterborough United	Free transfer	
7 August 2020	CF	(England)	Ollie Palmer	(England) Crawley Town	Free transfer	
12 August 2020	DM	(England)	Ethan Chislett	(England) Aldershot Town	Free transfer	
12 September 2020	CB	(Hungary)	Dániel Csóka	(England) Wolverhampton Wanderers	Free transfer	
19 November 2020	CB	(England)	Ben Heneghan	(England) Sheffield United	Free transfer	
31 January 2021	CF	(England)	Corie Andrews	(England) Kingstonian	Undisclosed	
8 February 2021	CF	(England)	Shayon Harrison	(Netherlands) Almere City	Free transfer	

=== Loans in ===
Date	Pos.	Nat.	Name	From	Date until	Ref.
4 August 2020	GK	(England)	Connal Trueman	(England) Birmingham City	8 January 2021	
13 August 2020	DM	(Finland)	Jaakko Oksanen	(England) Brentford	End of season	
26 August 2020	RW	(England)	Ryan Longman	(England) Brighton & Hove Albion	End of season	
24 September 2020	LB	(England)	Steve Seddon	(England) Birmingham City	31 December 2020	
11 January 2021	GK	(England)	Sam Walker	(England) Reading	End of season	
22 January 2021	DM	(England)	George Dobson	(England) Sunderland	End of season	
25 January 2021	CB	(England)	Darnell Johnson	(England) Leicester City	End of season	

=== Loans out ===
Date	Pos.	Nat.	Name	To	Date until	Ref.
11 September 2020	FW	(England)	David Fisher	(England) Carshalton Athletic	30 June 2021	
11 September 2020	CB	(England)	Archie Procter	(England) Carshalton Athletic	30 June 2021	
18 September 2020	MF	(England)	Elliott Bolton	(England) Merstham		
18 September 2020	LB	(England)	Jack Currie	(England) Leatherhead	2 January 2021	
18 September 2020	FW	(Wales)	Jack Madelin	(England) Leatherhead		
2 October 2020	AM	(England)	Ayoub Assal	(England) Billericay Town	2 November 2020	
15 October 2020	RB	(England)	Huseyin Biler	(England) Hendon	November 2020	
25 January 2021	CM	(England)	Anthony Hartigan	(Wales) Newport County	End of season	

=== Transfers out ===
Date	Pos.	Nat.	Name	To	Fee	Ref.
1 July 2020	CF	(Ghana)	Kwesi Appiah	(India) NorthEast United	Released	
1 July 2020	MF	(England)	Ossama Ashley	(England) West Ham United	Released	
1 July 2020	CB	(England)	Reuben Collins	(England) Truro City	Released	
1 July 2020	AM	(Republic of Ireland)	Dylan Connolly	(Scotland) St Mirren	Released	
1 July 2020	MF	(England)	Finlay Macnab	Unattached	Released	
1 July 2020	CB	(England)	Rod McDonald	(England) Carlisle United	Released	
1 July 2020	LW	(England)	Mitchell Pinnock	(Scotland) Kilmarnock	Released	
1 July 2020	RB	(England)	Kyron Stabana	(England) Tamworth	Released	
1 July 2020	RM	(England)	Scott Wagstaff	(England) Forest Green Rovers	Released	
1 July 2020	CF	(England)	Tommy Wood	(England) Tonbridge Angels	Released	
1 July 2020	CM	(England)	Anthony Wordsworth	(England) Barnet	Released	
9 September 2020	GK	(England)	Albert White	(England) Ipswich Town	Free transfer	
11 January 2021	FW	(Wales)	Adam Roscrow	(Wales) The New Saints	Undisclosed	

== Pre-season ==
With fans still unable to attend games due to COVID-19, AFC Wimbledon began pre-season with a behind-closed-doors friendly match against Corinthian-Casuals.

8 August 2020 Friendly	Corinthian-Casuals	0–5	AFC Wimbledon	Tolworth
12:00 BST		Report	Chiabi 3', 17', 31'; Guinness-Walker 27'; Thomas 42'	Stadium: King George's Field, Tolworth

11 August 2020 Friendly	Leatherhead	1–2	AFC Wimbledon	Leatherhead
19:45 BST	McGee 31'	Report	Woodyard 44'; Assal 85'	Stadium: Fetcham Grove

15 August 2020 Friendly	Tonbridge Angels	0–3	AFC Wimbledon	Tonbridge
13:00 BST		Report	Chislett 9'; Pigott 65'; Chiabi 72'	Stadium: Longmead Stadium

19 August 2020 Friendly	Metropolitan Police	0–3	AFC Wimbledon	Molesey
19:45 BST		Report	Hartigan 10' (pen.); Fisher 47'; Guinness-Walker 59'	Stadium: Imber Court

22 August 2020 Friendly	Queens Park Rangers	3–0	AFC Wimbledon	Shepherd's Bush, London
13:00 BST	Chair 15'; Dykes 43'; Osew 48' (o.g.)	Report		Stadium: Loftus Road

== Competitions ==
=== EFL League One ===
==== League table ====
Pos	Team	Pld	W	D	L	GF	GA	GD	Pts	Promotion, qualification or relegation
15	Fleetwood Town	46	16	12	18	49	46	+3	60	
16	Burton Albion	46	15	12	19	61	73	−12	57	
17	Shrewsbury Town	46	13	15	18	50	57	−7	54	
18	Plymouth Argyle	46	14	11	21	53	80	−27	53	
19	AFC Wimbledon	46	12	15	19	54	70	−16	51	
20	Wigan Athletic	46	13	9	24	54	77	−23	48	
21	Rochdale (R)	46	11	14	21	61	78	−17	47	Relegation to EFL League Two
22	Northampton Town (R)	46	11	12	23	41	67	−26	45	Relegation to EFL League Two
23	Swindon Town (R)	46	13	4	29	55	89	−34	43	Relegation to EFL League Two

Source: EFL Official Website
Rules for classification: 1) Points; 2) Goal difference; 3) Number of goals scored; 4) Head-to-head results; 5) Wins; 6) Away goals; 7) Penalty points (sec 9.5); 8) 12-point sending off offences
(R) Relegated

==== Results summary ====
Overall								Home						Away					
Pld	W	D	L	GF	GA	GD	Pts	W	D	L	GF	GA	GD	W	D	L	GF	GA	GD
46	12	15	19	54	70	−16	51	7	5	11	32	39	−7	5	10	8	22	31	−9

Last updated: 9 May 2021.
Source: BBC

==== Results by matchday ====
Matchday	1	2	3	4	5	6	7	8	9	10	11	12	13	14	15	16	17	18	19	20	21	22	23	24	25	26	27	28	29	30	31	32	33	34	35	36	37	38	39	40	41	42	43	44	45	46
Ground	A	H	A	H	A	H	A	A	H	A	H	A	A	H	H	A	A	H	A	H	H	A	A	A	H	A	A	H	H	A	A	H	A	H	H	H	A	H	A	H	H	H	A	H	H	A
Result	D	D	W	L	W	L	L	D	W	D	D	W	L	W	L	L	D	L	L	L	L	L	D	L	L	W	L	W	L	D	D	L	D	D	D	W	L	L	W	W	W	W	D	D	L	D
Position	9	16	8	12	10	11	13	16	11	11	11	11	12	11	14	14	14	15	18	20	21	21	20	21	21	19	21	20	22	21	22	23	24	22	23	21	21	22	20	19	19	19	19	19	19	19

Updated to match(es) played on 9 May 2021. Source: 11v11 for league tables and fixtures
A = Away; H = Home; W = Win; D = Draw; L = Loss

==== Matches ====
Win Draw Loss Postponed

The 2020–21 season fixtures were released on 21 August.

12 September 2020 1	Northampton Town	2–2	AFC Wimbledon	Sixfields
15:00 GMT	Warburton 19'; Korboa 31'	Report	Chislett 1'; Guinness-Walker 23'	Stadium: PTS Academy Stadium; Referee: Ollie Yates

19 September 2020 2	AFC Wimbledon	4–4	Plymouth Argyle	Shepherd's Bush, London
15:00 GMT	Pigott 18', 60'; McLoughlin 49'; Longman 69'	Report	Cooper 16'; Grant 45'; Canavan 76'; Telford 78'	Stadium: Kiyan Prince Foundation Stadium; Referee: Trevor Kettle

26 September 2020 3	Fleetwood Town	0–1	AFC Wimbledon	Fleetwood
15:00 GMT	Andrew (yellow card) 55'; Duffy (yellow card) 59'	Report	Kalambayi (yellow card) 34'; Seddon 41' (yellow card) 82'; McLoughlin (yellow card) 55'	Stadium: Highbury Stadium; Attendance: 0 Referee: Michael Salisbury

3 October 2020 4	AFC Wimbledon	1–2	Accrington Stanley	Shepherd's Bush
15:00 GMT	Longman 18'; Woodyard (yellow card) 27'	Report	Sykes 41'; Butcher 45'; Cassidy (yellow card) 62'; Pritchard (yellow card) 90+4'	Stadium: Kiyan Prince Foundation Stadium; Attendance: 0 Referee: Christopher Pollard

10 October 2020 5	Swindon Town	0–1	AFC Wimbledon	Swindon
15:00 GMT	Stevens (yellow card) 19'	Report	Pigott 28'; McLoughlin (yellow card) 66'	Stadium: County Ground; Attendance: 0 Referee: Will Finnie

17 October 2020 6	AFC Wimbledon	0–1	Shrewsbury Town	Shepherd's Bush
15:00 GMT	Oksanen (yellow card) 38'	Report	Ebanks-Landell (yellow card) 24'; Pierre (yellow card) 26'; Clarke 90+1'	Stadium: Kiyan Prince Foundation Stadium; Attendance: 0 Referee: Josh Smith

20 October 2020 7	Hull City	1–0	AFC Wimbledon	Kingston upon Hull
19:00 GMT	Lewis-Potter 45+7'; Wilks (yellow card) 89'; Honeyman (yellow card) 90+3'	Report	Woodyard (yellow card) 17'; Csóka (yellow card) 78'	Stadium: KCOM Stadium; Attendance: 0 Referee: James Oldham

24 October 2020 8	Burton Albion	1–1	AFC Wimbledon	Burton upon Trent
15:00 GMT	Gilligan (yellow card) 24'; Akins (yellow card) 28'; Hemmings 66'	Report	Longman 65'	Stadium: Pirelli Stadium; Attendance: 0 Referee: Sam Barrott

27 October 2020 9	AFC Wimbledon	1–0	Blackpool	Shepherd's Bush
19:00 GMT	Reilly 13'; Palmer (yellow card) 88'	Report	Ekpiteta (yellow card) 31'; Robson (red card) 38'; Ballard (red card) 75'	Stadium: Kiyan Prince Foundation Stadium; Attendance: 0 Referee: Sam Purkiss

31 October 2020 10	Milton Keynes Dons	1–1	AFC Wimbledon	Denbigh
15:00 GMT	Fraser 13'; Sorinola (yellow card) 34'; Harvie (yellow card) 90+3'	Report	Pigott 10' (yellow card) 90+4'; Reilly (yellow card) 31'	Stadium: Stadium MK; Attendance: 0 Referee: Chris Sarginson

3 November 2020 11	AFC Wimbledon	2–2	Doncaster Rovers	Wimbledon
19:45 GMT	Pigott 18', 83'	Report	Smith 24'; Wright (yellow card) 37'; Coppinger 90+1'	Stadium: Plough Lane; Attendance: 0 Referee: Darren Drysdale

21 November 2020 12	Rochdale	0–1	AFC Wimbledon	Rochdale
15:00 GMT		Report	Hartigan (yellow card) 30'; McLoughlin (yellow card) 72'; Chislett 90+1'	Stadium: Spotland Stadium; Attendance: 0 Referee: Declan Bourne

24 November 2020 13	Gillingham	2–1	AFC Wimbledon	Gillingham
18:00 GMT	Dempsey 3'; Samuel 57'	Report	Heneghan 28'	Stadium: Priestfield Stadium; Attendance: 0 Referee: Brett Huxtable

2 December 2020 14	AFC Wimbledon	2–1	Peterborough United	Wimbledon
19:45 GMT	Longman 54'; Pigott 60'; Nightingale (yellow card) 62'; Woodyard (yellow card) 84'	Report	Clarke-Harris 71'	Stadium: Plough Lane; Attendance: 0 Referee: Kevin Johnson

5 December 2020 15	AFC Wimbledon	2–4	Bristol Rovers	Wimbledon
15:00 GMT	Pigott 5' (pen.); Nightingale (yellow card) 11'; Heneghan 30'; Guinness-Walker (yellow card) 50'	Report	Nicholson 14', 64'; Hanlan 25', 45+1'	Stadium: Plough Lane; Attendance: 0 Referee: Ben Speedie

12 December 2020 16	Charlton Athletic	5–2	AFC Wimbledon	Charlton
15:00 GMT	Washington 37'; Aneke (yellow card) 57' (goal) 85'; Forster-Caskey 64'; Williams 65'; Purrington 90+2'	Report	Pigott 42'; Csoka 45'; Rudoni (yellow card) 59'; Trueman (yellow card) 63'	Stadium: The Valley (London); Attendance: 2,000; Referee: David Rock

15 December 2020 17	Sunderland	1–1	AFC Wimbledon	Sunderland
19:00 GMT	Wright 62'	Report	Pigott 42' (pen.); Reilly (yellow card) 49'; Longman (yellow card) 70'	Stadium: Stadium of Light; Attendance: 0 Referee: James Oldham

19 December 2020 18	AFC Wimbledon	1–2	Crewe Alexandra	Wimbledon
15:00 GMT	Woodyard (yellow card) 31'; Reilly (yellow card) 45+1'; Longman 90'	Report	Mandron 60'; Jääskeläinen (yellow card) 83'; Beckles (yellow card) 87'; Finney 90+1'	Stadium: Plough Lane; Attendance: 0 Referee: James Linington

26 December 2020 19	Oxford United	2–0	AFC Wimbledon	Oxford
15:00 GMT	Obita 13'; Taylor 22'; Rodríguez (yellow card) 50'; Agyei (yellow card) 83'	Report	Thomas (yellow card) 21'; Csóka (yellow card) 45+3'	Stadium: The Kassam Stadium; Attendance: 0 Referee: Sam Purkiss

2 January 2021 20	AFC Wimbledon	1–2	Lincoln City	Wimbledon
15:00 GMT	Palmer 31'; Woodyard (yellow card) 38'	Report	Edun 8'; Johnson (yellow card) 28'; Grant (yellow card) 68'; Hopper 83'	Stadium: Plough Lane; Attendance: 0 Referee: Lee Swabey

16 January 2021 21	AFC Wimbledon	0–3	Sunderland	Wimbledon
13:00 GMT	Rudoni (yellow card) 27'	Report	Wyke 7', 87', 90+1'	Stadium: Plough Lane; Attendance: 0 Referee: Antony Coggins

19 January 2021 22	Portsmouth	4–0	AFC Wimbledon	Milton
19:00 GMT	Marquis 28'; Williams 36'; Raggett 44'; Close 89'	Report		Stadium: Fratton Park; Attendance: 0 Referee: Trevor Kettle

23 January 2021 23	Crewe Alexandra	1–1	AFC Wimbledon	Crewe
15:00 GMT	Finney 31'	Report	Pigott 2'; McLoughlin (yellow card) 78'	Stadium: Alexandra Stadium; Attendance: 0 Referee: Kevin Johnson

26 January 2021 24	Doncaster Rovers	2–0	AFC Wimbledon	Doncaster
19:00 GMT	Okenabirhie 10'; Richards 37'	Report	Woodyard (yellow card) 45+1'	Stadium: Keepmoat Stadium; Referee: Peter Wright

30 January 2021 25	AFC Wimbledon	0–2	Milton Keynes Dons	Wimbledon
15:00 GMT	Guinness-Walker (yellow card) 50'; Reilly (yellow card) 73' Glyn Hodges (yellow card)	Report	Laird (yellow card) 52'; O'Riley 60'; Sorinola 62'	Stadium: Plough Lane; Attendance: 0 Referee: Ben Toner

6 February 2021 26	Wigan Athletic	2–3	AFC Wimbledon	Wigan
15:00 GMT	Tilt 45+2'; Proctor 68'; Merrie (yellow card) 71'	Report	Rudoni 22', (yellow card) 68'; Pigott 30', 76' (pen.); Nightingale (yellow card) 59'; Chislett (yellow card) 81'	Stadium: DW Stadium; Attendance: 0 Referee: Andy Haines

20 February 2021 27	Peterborough United	3–0	AFC Wimbledon	Peterborough
15:00 GMT	Szmodics 48', 52'; Clarke-Harris 90'	Report	Dobson (yellow card) 42'	Stadium: Weston Homes Stadium; Attendance: 0 Referee: Andy Woolmer

23 February 2021 28	AFC Wimbledon	1–0	Gillingham	Wimbledon
18:30 GMT	Rudoni 89'	Report	O'Keefe (yellow card) 90+1'	Stadium: Plough Lane; Attendance: 0 Referee: Paul Howard

27 February 2021 29	AFC Wimbledon	0–3	Hull City	Wimbledon
15:00 GMT	Woodyard (yellow card) 63'	Report	Magennis 24' (pen.); Burke 43'; Wilks 64' (pen.)	Stadium: Plough Lane; Attendance: 0 Referee: Craig Hicks

2 March 2021 30	Shrewsbury Town	1–1	AFC Wimbledon	Shrewsbury
19:00 GMT	Chapman 35'	Report	McLoughlin (yellow card) 67'; Assal 84'	Stadium: Montgomery Waters Meadow; Attendance: 0 Referee: James Adcock

6 March 2021 31	Blackpool	1–1	AFC Wimbledon	Blackpool
15:00 GMT	Yates (yellow card) 17'; Simms 59'	Report	O'Neill (yellow card) 24'; Palmer 90+3'	Stadium: Bloomfield Road; Attendance: 0 Referee: Thomas Bramall

9 March 2021 32	AFC Wimbledon	0–1	Burton Albion	Wimbledon
19:00 GMT	Heneghan (yellow card) 49'	Report	Bostwick 59'	Stadium: Plough Lane; Attendance: 0 Referee: Bobby Madley

13 March 2021 33	Bristol Rovers	0–0	AFC Wimbledon	Horfield
15:00 GMT	Upson (yellow card) 41'; Daly (yellow card) 90'	Report	Guinness-Walker (yellow card) 22'; Johnson (yellow card) 23'; Woodyard (yellow card) 48'; Pigott (yellow card) 55'	Stadium: Memorial Stadium; Attendance: 0 Referee: Sam Barrott

16 March 2021 34	AFC Wimbledon	1–1	Wigan Athletic	Wimbledon
18:30 GMT	Dobson 79'	Report	Proctor 58'	Stadium: Plough Lane; Attendance: 0 Referee: Paul Howard

20 March 2021 35	AFC Wimbledon	2–2	Charlton Athletic	Wimbledon
15:00 GMT	Longman 15', 65'; Oksanen (yellow card) 68'	Report	Stockley 10'; Jaiyesimi 20'; Aneke (yellow card) 81'	Stadium: Plough Lane; Attendance: 0 Referee: Charles Breakspear

27 March 2021 36	AFC Wimbledon	1–0	Northampton Town	Wimbledon
15:00 GMT	Woodyard (yellow card) 74'; Pigott 88'; Palmer (yellow card) 90+3'	Report	Hoskins (penalty missed) 90+7'	Stadium: Plough Lane; Attendance: 0 Referee: Ben Toner

2 April 2021 37	Plymouth Argyle	1–0	AFC Wimbledon	Plymouth
15:00 BST	Woods 11'; Fornah (yellow card) 29'	Report		Stadium: Home Park; Attendance: 0 Referee: Sam Allison

5 April 2021 38	AFC Wimbledon	0–1	Fleetwood Town	Wimbledon
15:00 BST	Heneghan (yellow card) 41'; Alexander (yellow card) 42'	Report	Connolly (yellow card) 12'; Burns (yellow card) 77'; Camps (yellow card) 86'; McKay 88'	Stadium: Plough Lane; Attendance: 0 Referee: Peter Wright

10 April 2021 39	Accrington Stanley	1–5	AFC Wimbledon	Accrington
15:00 BST	Nottingham 4'; Burgess (yellow card) 56'	Report	Palmer 21', 42'; Assal 45+1', 64'; Pigott 57'; Assal (yellow card) 65'; Heneghan (yellow card) 65' (yellow-red card) 90+2'	Stadium: Wham Stadium; Attendance: 0 Referee: James Oldham

13 April 2021 40	AFC Wimbledon	3–0	Ipswich Town	Wimbledon
18:30 BST	Nightingale 21'; Rudoni 25' (yellow card) 45+1'; Longman 86'	Report	Harrop (red card) 28'; Judge (yellow card) 58'	Stadium: Plough Lane; Attendance: 0 Referee: Antony Coggins

17 April 2021 41	AFC Wimbledon	4–1	Swindon Town	Wimbledon
17:30 BST	Pigott 20' (pen.), 60'; Nightingale 26'; Assal 44'; McLoughlin (yellow card) 90+3'	Report	Grounds (yellow card) 20'; Lyden (yellow card) 26'; Pitman (yellow card) 45+2'; Smith 79'	Stadium: Plough Lane; Attendance: 0 Referee: John Busby

20 April 2021 42	AFC Wimbledon	2–1	Oxford United	Wimbledon
19:00 BST	Pigott (yellow card) 58', (goal) 62' (pen.); Woodyard 64'; Guinness-Walker (yellow card) 81'	Report	Ruffels 52'; Henry (red card) 61'	Stadium: Plough Lane; Attendance: 0 Referee: Andy Davies

20 April 2021 43	Ipswich Town	0–0	AFC Wimbledon	Ipswich
15:00 BST	Edwards (yellow card) 44'	Report	Pigott (penalty missed) 22'	Stadium: Portman Road; Attendance: 0 Referee: Ollie Yates

27 April 2021 44	AFC Wimbledon	3–3	Rochdale	Wimbledon
19:00 BST	O'Neill (yellow card) 13'; Rudoni 61'; Palmer 66'; Pigott (penalty missed) 84', 90+6'	Report	Beesley 41'; Osho 57', (yellow card) 85'; Done (yellow card) 71'; Keohane 73'; Humphrys (yellow card) 90+3'	Stadium: Plough Lane; Attendance: 0 Referee: Carl Brook

1 May 2021 45	AFC Wimbledon	1–3	Portsmouth	Wimbledon
19:00 BST	Pigott 23'	report	Curtis 24'; Brown 45', 45+4'	Stadium: Plough Lane; Attendance: 0 Referee: Charles Breakspear

9 May 2021 46	Lincoln City	0–0	AFC Wimbledon	Lincoln
12:00 BST	McGrandles (yellow card) 32'	Report	Dobson (yellow card) 36'	Stadium: LNER Stadium; Attendance: 0 Referee: Scott Oldham

=== FA Cup ===
The draw for the first round was made on Monday 26, October. The second round draw was revealed on Monday, 9 November by Danny Cowley.

Win Draw Loss

26 November 2020 (Note: The match, originally scheduled for 7 November 2020, was postponed due to a number of AFC Wimbledon players being tested positive for COVID-19.) First round	Barrow	0–0 (a.e.t.) (2–4 p)	AFC Wimbledon	Barrow-in-Furness
19:45 GMT	Gribbin (yellow card) 40'; Hird (yellow card) 58'; Kay (yellow card) 90+5'	Report	Nightingale (yellow card) 35'; Palmer (yellow card) 57'; Guinness-Walker (yellow card) 83'	Stadium: Furness Building Society Stadium; Attendance: 0 Referee: Seb Stockbridge
	Penalties
	Angus (penalty missed); Quigley (penalty missed); Kay (penalty scored); Brough (penalty scored)		(penalty scored) Longman; (penalty scored) McLoughlin; (penalty scored) Seddon; (penalty scored) Rudoni

29 November 2020 Second round	AFC Wimbledon	1–2	Crawley Town	Wimbledon
13:30 GMT	Pigott 22'; Rudoni (yellow card) 90+4'	Report	Nadesan 30'; Powell (yellow card) 45+3'; Watters 50'	Stadium: Plough Lane; Attendance: 0 Referee: Robert Lewis

=== EFL Cup ===
Win Draw Loss

The first round draw was made on 18 August, live on Sky Sports, by Paul Merson.

5 September 2020 First round	Oxford United	1–1 (4–3 p)	AFC Wimbledon	Oxford
15:00 BST	Brannagan 63'	Report	Hartigan (yellow card) 61' (penalty missed) 84'; Taylor 67' (o.g.)	Stadium: The Kassam Stadium; Attendance: 0 Referee: Lee Swabey
	Penalties
	Forde (penalty scored); McGuane (penalty scored); Henry (penalty missed); Taylor (penalty scored); Brannagan (penalty scored)		O'Neill (penalty scored); Reilly (penalty missed); Guinness-Walker (penalty missed); Alexander (penalty scored); Pigott (penalty scored)

=== EFL Trophy ===
Win Draw Loss

The regional group stage draw was confirmed on 18 August. The second round draw was made by Matt Murray on 20 November, at St Andrew's. The third round was made on 10 December 2020 by Jon Parkin.

Pos	Div	Team	Pld	W	PW	PL	L	GF	GA	GD	Pts	Qualification
1	L2	Leyton Orient	3	2	0	0	1	6	5	+1	6	Advance to Round 2
2	L1	AFC Wimbledon	3	2	0	0	1	4	3	+1	6	Advance to Round 2
3	L1	Charlton Athletic	3	1	1	0	1	5	4	+1	5	
4	ACA	Brighton & Hove Albion U21	3	0	0	1	2	3	6	−3	1	

Source: EFL.com

1 September 2020 Group stage	AFC Wimbledon	2–1	Charlton Athletic	White City
17:30 BST	Roscrow 46'; Thomas 58'	Report	Oztumer 21'	Stadium: Kiyan Prince Foundation Stadium; Attendance: 0 Referee: Carl Brook

22 September 2020 Group stage	AFC Wimbledon	2–0	Brighton & Hove Albion U21	Crawley
18:00 BST	Robinson 20'; Roscrow 87' (pen.)	Report		Stadium: People's Pension Stadium; Attendance: 0 Referee: Craig Hicks

6 October 2020 Group stage	Leyton Orient	2–0	AFC Wimbledon	Leyton
19:00 BST	Angol 32' (pen.); Wilkinson 75'	Report		Stadium: Breyer Group Stadium; Attendance: 0 Referee: Sam Allison

8 December 2020 Second round	AFC Wimbledon	3–0	Arsenal U21	Wimbledon
18:00 GMT	Longman 67'; Osew 73'; Pigott (yellow card) 82' (goal) 90+3'	Report	Akinola (yellow card) 70' (yellow-red card) 80'; Azeez (yellow card) 74'; Saliba (yellow card) 74' (yellow-red card) 89'; López (yellow card) 86'	Stadium: Plough Lane; Attendance: 0 Referee: Christopher Pollard

12 January 2021 Third round	Bristol Rovers	0–1	AFC Wimbledon	Bristol
19:00 GMT	Ogogo (yellow card) 52'	Report	Rudoni 61'; Oksanen (yellow card) 86'	Stadium: Memorial Stadium; Attendance: 0 Referee: John Busby

2 February 2021 Quarter-final	Oxford United	3–1	AFC Wimbledon	Oxford
19:00 GMT	Winnall 13', 29'; Shodipo 52'	Report	Chislett 78'; Longman (yellow card) 82'	Stadium: The Kassam Stadium; Attendance: 0 Referee: Darren Drysdale

== Statistics ==
As of match played 9 May 2021

No.	Pos	Nat	Player	Total		League One		FA Cup		League Cup		League Trophy	
No.	Pos	Nat	Player	Apps	Goals	Apps	Goals	Apps	Goals	Apps	Goals	Apps	Goals
1	GK	(England) ENG	Connal Trueman	22	0	19+0	0	1+0	0	1+0	0	1+0	0
1	GK	(England) ENG	Sam Walker	14	0	12+0	0	0+0	0	0+0	0	2+0	0
2	DF	(England) ENG	Luke O'Neill	30	0	24+4	0	0+0	0	1+0	0	1+0	0
3	DF	(Hungary) HUN	Dániel Csóka	25	1	20+0	1	2+0	0	0+0	0	3+0	0
4	MF	(England) ENG	Alex Woodyard	45	1	39+1	1	1+0	0	1+0	0	2+1	0
5	DF	(England) ENG	Will Nightingale	38	2	29+3	2	1+0	0	0+0	0	5+0	0
6	DF	(England) ENG	Terell Thomas	25	1	17+2	0	2+0	0	1+0	0	2+1	1
7	DF	(England) ENG	Cheye Alexander	36	0	19+10	0	1+1	0	1+0	0	3+1	0
8	MF	(England) ENG	Anthony Hartigan	21	0	8+7	0	2+0	0	1+0	0	3+0	0
9	FW	(England) ENG	Ollie Palmer	27	5	10+13	5	2+0	0	0+0	0	2+0	0
10	FW	(Wales) WAL	Adam Roscrow	10	2	0+6	0	0+0	0	0+0	0	4+0	2
10	FW	(England) ENG	Shayon Harrison	1	0	0+1	0	0+0	0	0+0	0	0+0	0
11	MF	(South Africa) RSA	Ethan Chislett	36	3	12+15	2	2+0	0	0+1	0	5+1	1
12	MF	(England) ENG	Jack Rudoni	44	5	33+6	4	1+1	0	0+0	0	2+1	1
13	GK	(New Zealand) NZL	Nik Tzanev	19	0	15+0	0	1+0	0	0+0	0	3+0	0
14	FW	(England) ENG	Zach Robinson	8	1	0+5	0	0+0	0	0+0	0	1+2	1
16	MF	(Finland) FIN	Jaakko Oksanen	30	0	12+15	0	0+0	0	0+0	0	3+0	0
17	MF	(England) ENG	Ayoub Assal	16	4	10+4	4	0+0	0	0+0	0	0+2	0
18	DF	(England) ENG	Nesta Guinness-Walker	34	1	24+6	1	1+0	0	1+0	0	2+0	0
19	MF	(Republic of Ireland) IRL	Shane McLoughlin	44	1	23+15	1	1+1	0	0+0	0	4+0	0
20	DF	(England) ENG	Huseyin Biler	1	0	0+0	0	0+0	0	0+0	0	0+1	0
22	DF	(England) ENG	Ben Heneghan	24	2	20+3	2	1+0	0	0+0	0	0+0	0
24	MF	(England) ENG	George Dobson	24	1	22+2	1	0+0	0	0+0	0	0+0	0
25	DF	(England) ENG	Archie Procter	2	0	0+0	0	0+0	0	0+0	0	1+1	0
26	DF	(England) ENG	Jack Currie	1	0	0+0	0	0+0	0	0+0	0	0+1	0
27	DF	(England) ENG	Darnell Johnson	11	0	11+0	0	0+0	0	0+0	0	0+0	0
29	MF	(England) ENG	Ryan Longman	51	9	35+8	8	0+2	0	1+0	0	4+1	1
30	DF	(England) ENG	Paul Kalambayi	19	0	10+4	0	0+0	0	1+0	0	4+0	0
33	MF	(Republic of Ireland) IRL	Callum Reilly	35	1	22+6	1	1+0	0	1+0	0	3+2	0
37	DF	(England) ENG	Paul Osew	14	1	0+10	0	0+0	0	0+0	0	4+0	1
39	FW	(England) ENG	Joe Pigott	52	22	45+0	20	1+1	1	1+0	0	1+3	1
42	DF	(England) ENG	Steve Seddon	18	1	14+1	1	1+1	0	0+0	0	1+0	0

=== Goals record ===
As of match played 9 May 2021

Rank	No.	Nat.	Po.	Name	League One	FA Cup	League Cup	League Trophy	Total
1	39	(England)	CF	Joe Pigott	20	1	0	1	22
2	29	(England)	RW	Ryan Longman	8	0	0	1	9
3	9	(England)	CF	Ollie Palmer	5	0	0	0	5
3	12	(England)	CM	Jack Rudoni	4	0	0	1	5
5	17	(England)	AM	Ayoub Assal	4	0	0	0	4
6	11	(South Africa)	AM	Ethan Chislett	2	0	0	1	3
7	5	(England)	CB	Will Nightingale	2	0	0	0	2
7	10	(Wales)	CF	Adam Roscrow	0	0	0	2	2
7	22	(England)	CB	Ben Heneghan	2	0	0	0	2
10	3	(Hungary)	CB	Dániel Csóka	1	0	0	0	1
10	4	(England)	DM	Alex Woodyard	1	0	0	0	1
10	6	(England)	CB	Terell Thomas	0	0	0	1	1
10	14	(England)	CF	Zach Robinson	0	0	0	1	1
10	18	(England)	LB	Nesta Guinness-Walker	1	0	0	0	1
10	19	(Republic of Ireland)	AM	Shane McLoughlin	1	0	0	0	1
10	24	(England)	DM	George Dobson	1	0	0	0	1
10	33	(Republic of Ireland)	CM	Callum Reilly	1	0	0	0	1
10	37	(England)	LB	Paul Osew	0	0	0	1	1
10	42	(England)	LB	Steve Seddon	1	0	0	0	1
Own Goals					0	0	1	0	1
Total					54	1	1	9	65

=== Disciplinary record ===
As of match played 9 May 2021

Rank	No.	Nat.	Po.	Name	League One			FA Cup			League Cup			League Trophy			Total		
Rank	No.	Nat.	Po.	Name	Yellow card	(yellow card) (yellow-red card)	Red card	Yellow card	(yellow card) (yellow-red card)	Red card	Yellow card	(yellow card) (yellow-red card)	Red card	Yellow card	(yellow card) (yellow-red card)	Red card	Yellow card	(yellow card) (yellow-red card)	Red card
1	22	(England)	CB	Ben Heneghan	2	1	0	0	0	0	0	0	0	0	0	0	2	1	0
2	4	(England)	CM	Alex Woodyard	10	0	0	0	0	0	0	0	0	0	0	0	10	0	0
3	19	(Republic of Ireland)	AM	Shane McLoughlin	6	0	0	0	0	0	0	0	0	0	0	0	6	0	0
3	39	(England)	CF	Joe Pigott	5	0	0	0	0	0	0	0	0	1	0	0	6	0	0
5	12	(England)	CM	Jack Rudoni	4	0	0	1	0	0	0	0	0	0	0	0	5	0	0
5	18	(England)	LB	Nesta Guinness-Walker	4	0	0	1	0	0	0	0	0	0	0	0	5	0	0
7	5	(England)	CB	Will Nightingale	3	0	0	1	0	0	0	0	0	0	0	0	4	0	0
7	33	(Republic of Ireland)	CM	Callum Reilly	4	0	0	0	0	0	0	0	0	0	0	0	4	0	0
9	9	(England)	CF	Ollie Palmer	2	0	0	1	0	0	0	0	0	0	0	0	3	0	0
9	16	(Finland)	CM	Jaakko Oksanen	2	0	0	0	0	0	0	0	0	1	0	0	3	0	0
9	24	(England)	DM	George Dobson	3	0	0	0	0	0	0	0	0	0	0	0	3	0	0
12	2	(England)	RB	Luke O'Neill	2	0	0	0	0	0	0	0	0	0	0	0	2	0	0
12	3	(Hungary)	CB	Dániel Csóka	2	0	0	0	0	0	0	0	0	0	0	0	2	0	0
12	6	(England)	CB	Terell Thomas	2	0	0	0	0	0	0	0	0	0	0	0	2	0	0
12	7	(England)	RB	Cheye Alexander	2	0	0	0	0	0	0	0	0	0	0	0	2	0	0
12	8	(England)	CM	Anthony Hartigan	1	0	0	0	0	0	1	0	0	0	0	0	2	0	0
12	29	(England)	RW	Ryan Longman	1	0	0	0	0	0	0	0	0	1	0	0	2	0	0
18	1	(England)	GK	Connal Trueman	1	0	0	0	0	0	0	0	0	0	0	0	1	0	0
18	11	(South Africa)	AM	Ethan Chislett	1	0	0	0	0	0	0	0	0	0	0	0	1	0	0
18	17	(England)	AM	Ayoub Assal	1	0	0	0	0	0	0	0	0	0	0	0	1	0	0
18	27	(England)	CB	Darnell Johnson	1	0	0	0	0	0	0	0	0	0	0	0	1	0	0
18	30	(England)	CB	Paul Kalambayi	1	0	0	0	0	0	0	0	0	0	0	0	1	0	0
18	42	(England)	LB	Steve Seddon	1	0	0	0	0	0	0	0	0	0	0	0	1	0	0
Total					61	1	0	4	0	0	1	0	0	3	0	0	69	1	0
