= Archie Procter =

English footballer

Personal information
- Full name: Archie Mark Procter
- Date of birth: 13 November 2001 (age 25)
- Place of birth: Blackburn, England
- Height: 1.85 m (6 ft 1 in)
- Position: Defender

Youth career
- –2020: AFC Wimbledon

Senior career*
Years	Team	Apps	(Gls)
2020–2021	AFC Wimbledon	0	(0)
2020	→ Metropolitan Police (loan)	3	(0)
2020	→ Carshalton Athletic (loan)	7	(0)
2021	→ Maidstone United (loan)	0	(0)
2021–2022	Accrington Stanley	0	(0)
2022–2024	Dorking Wanderers	5	(0)
2023	Dorking Wanderers B	1	(0)
2023	→ Weymouth (loan)	2	(0)
2023–2024	→ Eastbourne Borough (loan)	24	(1)
2024	Walton & Hersham	11	(0)
- * Club domestic league appearances and goals as of 00:58, 22 May 2026 (UTC)

Archie Mark Procter (born 13 November 2001) is an English footballer who last played as a defender for Walton & Hersham.

== Career ==
=== AFC Wimbledon ===
Procter made his debut for AFC Wimbledon on 1 September 2020 in the EFL Trophy, coming on as a 62' minute substitute against Charlton Athletic.

On 16 February 2021, Procter joined National League South side Maidstone United on loan for the remainder of the 2020–21 season.

=== Accrington Stanley ===
On 1 July 2021, Procter signed for League One side Accrington Stanley for an undisclosed fee, signing a two-year contract.

=== Dorking Wanderers ===
On 4 November 2022, Proctor signed for Dorking Wanderers.

On 7 March 2023, Procter joined Weymouth on loan until the end of the season.

Ahead of the 2023/24 season, Proctor joined National League South club Eastbourne Borough on a six-month loan.

On 3 May 2024, it was announced that Procter would leave the club at the end of his contract in June.

=== Walton & Hersham FC ===
On 24 June 2024, Procter signed for Walton & Hersham

== Personal life ==
Procter is the cousin of former midfielder Andrew Procter, who most notably played for Accrington Stanley.

== Career statistics ==
=== Club ===
As of 22 October 2024

Appearances and goals by club, season and competition
Club	Season	League			National Cup		League Cup		Other		Total	
Club	Season	Division	Apps	Goals	Apps	Goals	Apps	Goals	Apps	Goals	Apps	Goals
AFC Wimbledon	2019–20	League One	0	0	0	0	0	0	0	0	0	0
AFC Wimbledon	2020–21	League One	0	0	0	0	0	0	2 (Note: Appearance(s) in the EFL Trophy)	0	2	0
AFC Wimbledon	Total		0	0	0	0	0	0	2	0	2	0
Metropolitan Police (loan)	2019–20	Southern Premier League Division South	3	0	0	0	—		0	0	3	0
Carshalton Athletic (loan)	2020–21	Isthmian Premier Division	7	0	2	0	—		3 (Note: Appearance(s) in the FA Trophy)	0	12	0
Maidstone United (loan)	2020–21	National League South	0	0	0	0	—		0	0	0	0
Accrington Stanley	2021–22	League One	0	0	0	0	1	0	3	0	4	0
Dorking Wanderers	2022–23	National League	5	0	0	0	—		0	0	5	0
Dorking Wanderers B	2022–23	Southern Combination League Division One	1	0	—		—		0	0	1	0
Weymouth (loan)	2022–23	National League South	2	0	0	0	—		0	0	2	0
Eastbourne Borough (loan)	2023–24	National League South	24	1	1	0	—		3 (Note: One appearance in the FA Trophy, two appearances in the Sussex Senior Cup)	0	28	1
Walton & Hersham	2024–25	Southern League Premier Division South	11	0	4	0	—		1	0	16	0
Career total			53	1	7	0	1	0	12	0	72	1
