= Jack Madelin =

Welsh footballer

Personal information
- Full name: Jack Douglas Madelin
- Date of birth: 19 April 2002 (age 24)
- Place of birth: Westminster, England
- Position: Defender

Youth career
- 2014–2019: AFC Wimbledon

Senior career*
Years	Team	Apps	(Gls)
2019–2022	AFC Wimbledon	1	(0)
2020	→ Leatherhead (loan)	1	(0)

International career
- Wales U16
2017–	Wales U17	11	(1)
- * Club domestic league appearances and goals as of 01:00, 18 August 2021 (UTC)

Jack Douglas Madelin (born 19 April 2002) is a Welsh professional footballer who most recently played as a defender for AFC Wimbledon.

== Club career ==
On 22 October 2019, after progressing through AFC Wimbledon's academy, Madelin made his debut for the club in a 1–0 loss against Burton Albion. In May 2022 he was announced as leaving AFC Wimbledon at the end of his contract.

== International career ==
In April 2017, Madelin made his debut for Wales under-17 against Switzerland U17, after previously appearing for Wales U16.

== Career statistics ==
As of match played 13 November 2019.

Appearances and goals by club, season and competition
Club	Season	League			FA Cup		League Cup		Other		Total	
Club	Season	Division	Apps	Goals	Apps	Goals	Apps	Goals	Apps	Goals	Apps	Goals
AFC Wimbledon	2019–20	League One	1	0	0	0	0	0	1 (Note: Appearance(s) in Football League Trophy)	0	2	0
AFC Wimbledon	2020–21	League One	0	0	0	0	0	0	0	0	0	0
AFC Wimbledon	Total		1	0	0	0	0	0	1	0	2	0
Career total			1	0	0	0	0	0	1	0	2	0
