= Ayoub Assal =

English footballer

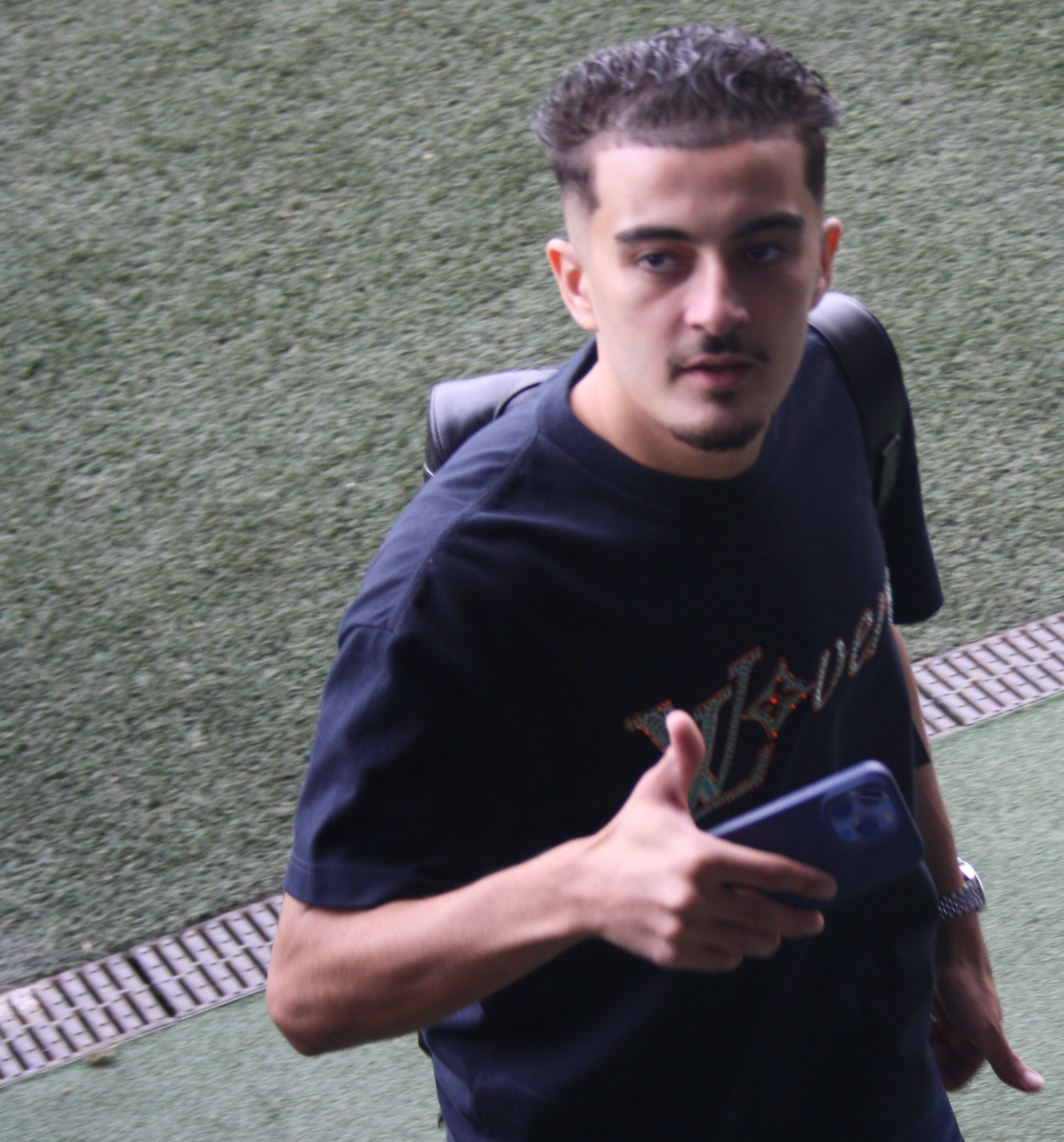
- Ayoub Assal in 2025

Personal information
- Full name: Ayoub Assal
- Date of birth: 21 January 2002 (age 24)
- Place of birth: Maidstone, England
- Height: 1.72 m (5 ft 8 in)
- Positions: Attacking midfielder; winger

Team information
- Current team: Al-Wakrah
- Number: 7

Youth career
- 2010–2011: Millwall
- 2011–2019: AFC Wimbledon

Senior career*
Years	Team	Apps	(Gls)
2019–2023	AFC Wimbledon	78	(17)
2019–2020	→ Metropolitan Police (loan)	15	(2)
2020	→ Billericay Town (loan)	1	(0)
2023–	Al-Wakrah	54	(13)
2023	→ Al-Markhiya (loan)	14	(4)
- * Club domestic league appearances and goals as of 17 January 2026

Ayoub Assal (born 21 January 2002) is an English professional footballer who plays as a midfielder for Qatar Stars League club Al-Wakrah.

== Club career ==
Assal began his career in the youth system at Millwall, joining AFC Wimbledon at under-12 level. In April 2019, Assal signed his first professional contract with Wimbledon. In August 2019, Assal joined Metropolitan Police on loan. After returning to Wimbledon, he made his debut for the club on 13 November in a 3–1 EFL Trophy loss against Southend United. On 11 January 2020, Assal rejoined Metropolitan Police on loan until 25 April 2020.

In October 2020, Assal joined National League South side Billericay Town. He returned to Wimbledon after making one appearance during his loan, and made his league debut as a substitute against Shrewsbury Town on 2 March 2021, scoring a late equaliser in a 1–1 draw. On 10 April, Assal scored twice for AFC Wimbledon in a 5–1 win against Accrington Stanley, and in May he signed a new three-year contract with Wimbledon.

On 10 December 2022, Assal was awarded the EFL Young Player of the Month Award for November 2022 having scored in all five of Wimbledon's matches across all competitions. This was the second time he had received the award having also won in April 2021, only the second player, after Djed Spence, to win the award twice.

On 18 January 2023, it was announced that the release clause in Assal's contract had been triggered by a bid from a club based in Qatar. On 27 January, Assal completed his transfer to Al-Wakrah, where he signed a five-year contract. The fee was a club record sale for the Dons. On 29 January, Assal joined Al-Markhiya on loan for the rest of the season.

== International career ==
Born in England, Assal is of Moroccan descent. In March 2022, he was called up to the provisional England U20 squad, having previously attended a training camp with Morocco U20.

== Career statistics ==
As of match played 7 May 2024

Appearances and goals by club, season and competition
Club	Season	League			FA Cup		League Cup		Other		Total	
Club	Season	Division	Apps	Goals	Apps	Goals	Apps	Goals	Apps	Goals	Apps	Goals
AFC Wimbledon	2019–20	League One	0	0	0	0	0	0	1 (Note: Appearance(s) in Football League Trophy)	0	1	0
AFC Wimbledon	2020–21	League One	14	4	0	0	0	0	2	0	16	4
AFC Wimbledon	2021–22	League One	42	8	3	2	2	0	2	0	49	10
AFC Wimbledon	2022–23	League Two	22	5	3	2	1	0	5	3	31	10
AFC Wimbledon	Total		78	17	6	4	3	0	10	3	97	24
Metropolitan Police (loan)	2019–20	Southern League Premier Division South	15	2	2	0	—		2 (Note: One appearance in FA Trophy, one appearance in Southern League Cup)	0	19	2
Billericay Town (loan)	2020–21	National League South	1	0	0	0	—		0	0	1	0
Al-Wakrah	2022–23	Qatar Stars League	0	0	0	0	0	0	0	0	0	0
Al-Wakrah	2023–24	Qatar Stars League	20	6	0	0	0	0	1	0	21	6
Al-Wakrah	Total		20	6	0	0	0	0	1	0	9	3
Al-Markhiya (loan)	2022–23	Qatar Stars League	14	4	1	0	0	0	0	0	15	4
Career total			128	29	9	4	3	0	13	3	153	36

== Honours ==
Individual

- EFL Young Player of the Month: April 2021, November 2022
