= Ryan Longman =

English footballer (born 2000)

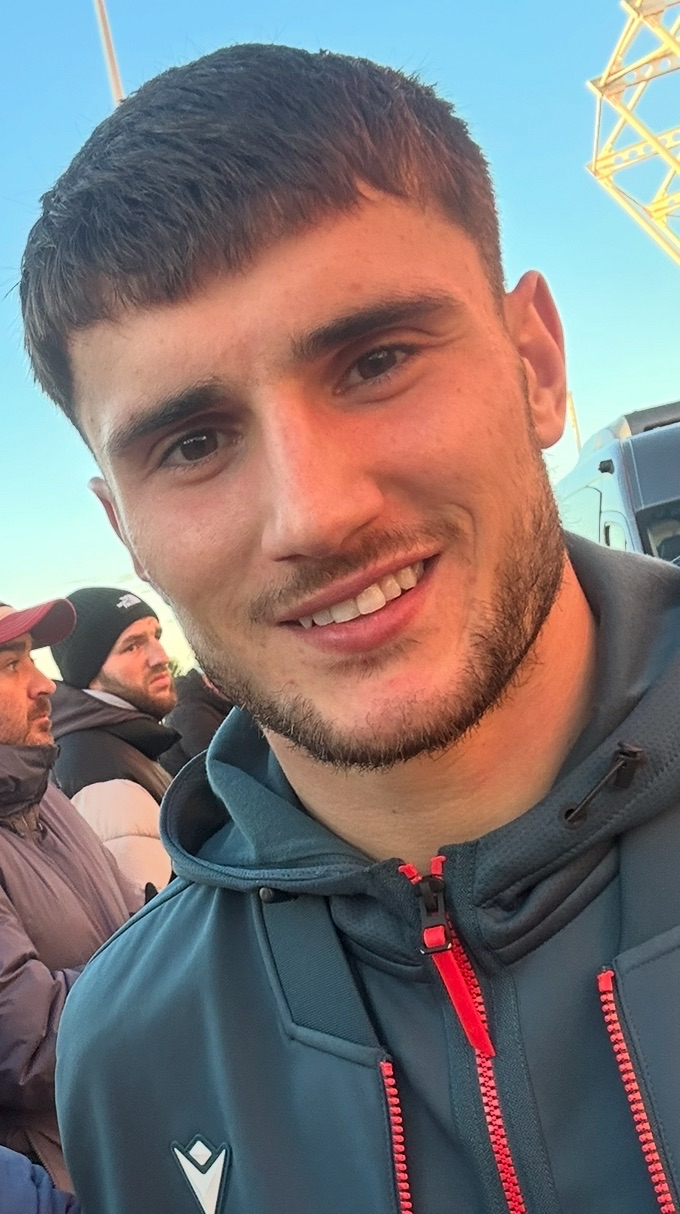
- Longman with Wrexham in 2025

Personal information
- Full name: Ryan James Longman
- Date of birth: 6 November 2000 (age 26)
- Place of birth: Redhill, England
- Height: 5 ft 11 in (1.80 m)
- Positions: Winger; wing-back

Team information
- Current team: Wrexham
- Number: 47

Youth career
- –2019: Brighton & Hove Albion

Senior career*
Years	Team	Apps	(Gls)
2019–2022	Brighton & Hove Albion	0	(0)
2020–2021	→ AFC Wimbledon (loan)	44	(8)
2021–2022	→ Hull City (loan)	19	(3)
2022–2025	Hull City	62	(4)
2023–2024	→ Millwall (loan)	35	(3)
2025–	Wrexham	52	(3)
- * Club domestic league appearances and goals as of 10 August 2026

Ryan James Longman (born 6 November 2000) is an English professional footballer who plays primarily as a winger for EFL Championship club Wrexham.

== Career ==
=== Brighton & Hove Albion ===
Longman made his professional footballing debut on 25 September 2019, coming on as a 58th minute substitute for Aaron Connolly in the 3–1 home loss against fellow Premier League opposition Aston Villa in the EFL Cup third round.

==== AFC Wimbledon (loan) ====
On 26 August 2020, Longman signed for League One side AFC Wimbledon on loan for the full 2020–21 season. He made his debut 6 days later starting in the 2–1 EFL Trophy victory over Charlton. Longman made his senior league debut playing 86 minutes in the 2–2 away draw against Northampton on 12 September. He scored his first goal for The Wombles on 19 September in a 4–4 home draw against Plymouth Argyle.

=== Hull City ===
On 7 July 2021, Longman signed a season-long loan deal with Hull City. Longman made his Hull and Championship debut on 14 August, starting but only playing 35 minutes of the eventual 3–0 home loss against Queens Park Rangers. He made his return on 28 August, after picking up an injury on his debut, starting and playing 58 minutes of the 0–0 home draw against Bournemouth. On 27 November, Longman scored his first goal for The Tigers, the winner, in a 2–1 home win against Millwall. Two weeks later, he scored his second goal in Hull City colours, scoring the opener in the third minute in an eventual 2–2 home draw against Bristol City. Longman curled in a brilliant equaliser in the home FA Cup third round tie against Everton to send the game to extra time, in the eventual 3–2 loss on 8 January 2022. On 31 January 2022, Hull completed the permanent transfer of Longman for an undisclosed fee.

==== Millwall ====
On 1 September 2023, Longman joined fellow Championship club Millwall on a season-long loan.

=== Wrexham ===
On 24 January 2025, it was announced that Longman had joined EFL League One club Wrexham for an undisclosed fee.

== Career statistics ==
As of 7 August 2026

Appearances and goals by club, season and competition
Club	Season	League			FA Cup		League Cup		Other		Total	
Club	Season	Division	Apps	Goals	Apps	Goals	Apps	Goals	Apps	Goals	Apps	Goals
Brighton & Hove Albion U21	2019–20	—			—		—		2 (Note: Appearances in EFL Trophy)	0	2	0
Brighton & Hove Albion	2019–20	Premier League	0	0	0	0	1	0	—		1	0
AFC Wimbledon (loan)	2020–21	League One	44	8	2	0	1	0	5	1	52	9
Hull City (loan)	2021–22	Championship	19	3	1	1	0	0	—		20	4
Hull City	2021–22	Championship	16	1	0	0	0	0	—		16	1
Hull City	2022–23	Championship	37	2	0	0	0	0	—		37	2
Hull City	2023–24	Championship	0	0	0	0	0	0	—		0	0
Hull City	2024–25	Championship	9	1	0	0	0	0	—		9	1
Hull City	Total		62	4	0	0	0	0	0	0	62	4
Millwall (loan)	2023–24	Championship	35	3	1	0	0	0	—		36	3
Wrexham	2024–25	League One	19	1	—		—		2	0	21	1
Wrexham	2025–26	Championship	33	2	3	0	4	0	—		40	2
Wrexham	2026–27	Championship	0	0	0	0	1	0	0	0	1	0
Wrexham	Total		52	3	3	0	5	0	2	0	62	3
Total			212	21	7	1	7	0	9	1	235	23
