= Callum Reilly =

English footballer

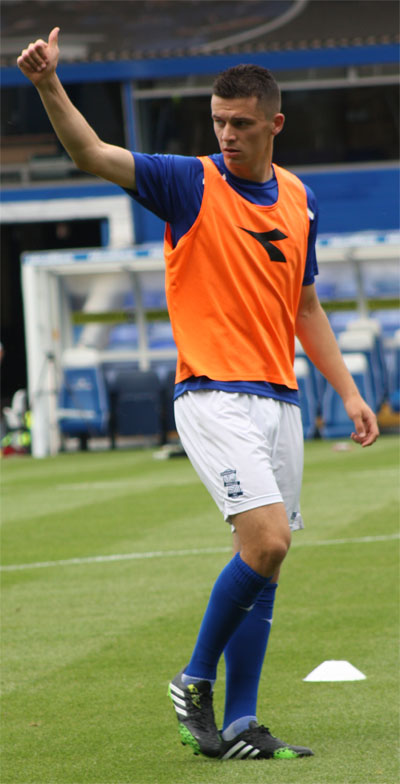
- With Birmingham City in 2013 pre-season

Personal information
- Full name: Callum Anthony Reilly
- Date of birth: 3 October 1993 (age 33)
- Place of birth: Warrington, England
- Height: 6 ft 1 in (1.85 m)
- Position: Midfielder

Youth career
- 2000–2012: Birmingham City

Senior career*
Years	Team	Apps	(Gls)
2012–2015	Birmingham City	60	(2)
2015	→ Burton Albion (loan)	2	(0)
2015–2017	Burton Albion	14	(0)
2017	→ Coventry City (loan)	18	(0)
2017–2018	Bury	18	(0)
2018	→ Gillingham (loan)	15	(0)
2018–2019	Gillingham	25	(5)
2019–2021	AFC Wimbledon	58	(5)
2021–2022	Leyton Orient	4	(0)
2022	→ Solihull Moors (loan)	9	(0)
2022–2023	Banbury United	20	(0)
2023–2024	Tamworth	12	(0)

International career
2013–2014	Republic of Ireland U21	8	(0)
- * Club domestic league appearances and goals as of 12:29, 21 April 2024 (UTC)

Callum Anthony Reilly (born 3 October 1993) is a professional footballer who plays as a midfielder.

A midfielder who has also played at full back, Reilly began his career as a youngster with Birmingham City. He made his first-team debut in January 2012, turned professional later that year, and over the next three seasons made 66 appearances in all competitions. He had a short spell on loan at Burton Albion in 2015, and joined the club on a two-year contract in June of that year. Unable to establish himself in their first team, he spent the second half of the 2016–17 season on loan to Coventry City, and then joined Bury. After a loan spell at Gillingham, he signed for them ahead of the 2018–19 season. He was released in 2019, and spent the next two seasons with AFC Wimbledon in EFL League One before signing a one-year contract with Leyton Orient in 2021. He spent much of that season either injured or on loan at Solihull Moors, joined Banbury United in September 2022, and signed for Tamworth in 2023.

He has represented the Republic of Ireland at under-21 level.

== Club career ==
=== Birmingham City ===
Reilly was born in Warrington, Cheshire, and raised in Solihull, West Midlands, where he attended St Peter's Catholic School. He joined Birmingham City's youth system at the age of seven, and began a two-year scholarship in July 2010.

He was given a first-team squad number in January 2012, and his first competitive involvement came when he was named among the substitutes for the third-round FA Cup-tie against Wolverhampton Wanderers, remaining unused. Reilly made his first-team debut on 28 January, coming on as an 80th-minute substitute for Jordon Mutch in the fourth-round FA Cup-tie against Sheffield United at Bramall Lane, with Birmingham already 4–0 ahead.

He signed his first professional contract, of one year, before the 2012–13 season, and was given a squad number before the visit to Millwall in October.

With Hayden Mullins suspended and Jonathan Spector injured for the visit of Crystal Palace on 15 December, Reilly made his first start, and first appearance in the Football League, alongside Papa Bouba Diop in central midfield. He played the full 90 minutes as Birmingham came back from 2–0 down to draw. In first-half stoppage time of the visit to Huddersfield Town in January 2013, "Chris Burke's cross was headed into the path of Reilly, who smashed the ball into the net" from 10 yards (9.1 m) to score his first senior goal. He was substituted at half-time due to illness, and the match was drawn. In April, the club took up their option to extend Reilly's contract for another year. He ended the season with 18 league appearances, and signed a new two-year contract ahead of the 2013–14 campaign.

Reilly had hoped to be a regular in the first team in the 2013–14 season, but an influx of new players, including midfielders Andy Shinnie and Tom Adeyemi, meant it took until late September and a good performance in the League Cup victory over Premier League club Swansea City that he made his first league start, against Reading. In the following game, a 4–0 win against Millwall, manager Lee Clark described the performance of Reilly and Adeyemi in partnership in defensive midfield as brilliant. They played regularly together until January, when new arrivals, including Manchester City's Emyr Huws and the experienced Brian Howard, caused Reilly to fall out of favour. By the end of March, with Birmingham struggling, Reilly returned to the team, playing either in midfield or at left back. On the last day of the season, needing at least a draw at Bolton Wanderers and for other results to go in their favour to avoid relegation to League One, he started at left back, later moving into central midfield to replace the injured Huws, as the team came back from 2–0 down to equalise in the third minute of stoppage time and maintain their second-tier status.

Eight minutes into his first match of the 2014–15 season, away at league leaders Norwich City, Reilly scored the opening goal, a deflected effort from hit with his weaker right foot from 25 yards (23 m), and in the next match, he made his 50th appearance. But in the face of competition from new signings Stephen Gleeson and David Davis, and later from loanee Robert Tesche, he was unable to establish himself in the starting eleven. On 11 March 2015, he joined League Two club Burton Albion on loan until the end of the season. Birmingham manager Gary Rowett intended the loan spell as an opportunity for the player to earn a new contract. Reilly made his Burton debut as a late substitute in a 3–0 win against Accrington Stanley. He started the next match, but suffered a hamstring injury after 11 minutes that put an end to his season. He was released by Birmingham when his contract expired, and according to the Birmingham Mail's season summary, could consider himself unlucky.

=== Burton Albion ===
On 5 June 2015, Reilly agreed a two-year contract with Burton Albion, newly promoted to League One, subject to passing a medical. He scored his first goal for the club against Bury in an EFL Cup tie on 10 August 2016.

Reilly joined League One club Coventry City on 1 January 2017 on loan until the end of the season, as part of a deal in which Stuart Beavon signed permanently for Coventry and Marvin Sordell moved in the opposite direction. He played regularly, making 20 appearances in all competitions and helping Coventry reach the 2017 EFL Trophy Final, but was unable to take part because of a hamstring injury suffered the previous day. Reilly was released by Burton when his contract expired.

=== Bury ===
Ahead of the 2017–18 season, Reilly signed a two-year deal with another League One club, Bury, where he was reunited with manager Lee Clark, who had given him his league debut for Birmingham. He was in the starting eleven for the opening fixture of the 2017–18 season, a 1–0 win at home to Walsall, and made 15 league starts in the first half of the campaign as well as scoring his first goal for the club in an EFL Trophy tie against Stoke City U21s, after which he was loaned to League One club Gillingham.

=== Gillingham ===
Reilly was a regular in the starting eleven throughout his loan spell, and on 3 July 2018 made the move permanent, signing a two-year contract. He was released by mutual consent on 26 July 2019.

=== AFC Wimbledon ===
The same day, Reilly signed for another League One club, AFC Wimbledon. He scored his first goal for Wimbledon in an EFL Trophy tie against Leyton Orient on 8 October 2019. He played in 35 of AFC Wimbledon's 41 matches before the season was ended early because of the COVID-19 pandemic, mostly as a starter, and made a further 35 appearances in 2020–21 before his personal season was ended by an ankle fractured during a match against Wigan Athletic in March. Reilly was released at the end of the season.

=== Leyton Orient ===
Reilly signed for Leyton Orient on a one-year contract on 31 August 2021. He made his league debut four days later as a substitute, and started in the EFL Trophy against Southampton U21, but a recurring groin injury interrupted his progress. He returned to the first-team squad in February 2022, but was then loaned to National League club Solihull Moors, initially for a month. The deal was extended until the end of the season, and Reilly was a regular in the matchday squad but rarely started. He helped Moors reach the play-off final, in which he was a late substitute as Grimsby Town won the match after extra time. He was released by Leyton Orient at the end of the season.

=== Banbury United ===
Reilly signed for National League North club Banbury United on 16 September 2022, making twenty league appearances over the course of the season.

=== Tamworth ===
In June 2023, Reilly joined another National League North club in newly promoted Tamworth. During his first season, the club achieved a second consecutive promotion, being declared champions with two matches remaining. In May 2024, he departed the club.

== International career ==
Reilly received his first call-up to the Republic of Ireland under-21 team for a friendly match against the Netherlands on 6 February 2013. He was selected in the starting eleven, and played 64 minutes before being substituted, as Ireland won 3–0. On his second appearance, he played the first half of a 2–1 home defeat to Portugal in March. He had a chance of scoring on his first competitive appearance for the under-21s, in a European championship qualifier away to the Faroe Islands, but his shot was well saved; Ireland won 4–1.

== Career statistics ==
As of end of 2023–24 season

Appearances and goals by club, season and competition
Club	Season	League			FA Cup		League Cup		Other		Total	
Club	Season	Division	Apps	Goals	Apps	Goals	Apps	Goals	Apps	Goals	Apps	Goals
Birmingham City	2011–12	Championship	0	0	1	0	0	0	0	0	1	0
Birmingham City	2012–13	Championship	18	1	1	0	0	0	—		19	1
Birmingham City	2013–14	Championship	25	0	0	0	3	0	—		28	0
Birmingham City	2014–15	Championship	17	1	1	0	0	0	—		18	1
Birmingham City	Total		60	2	3	0	3	0	0	0	66	2
Burton Albion (loan)	2014–15	League Two	2	0	—		—		—		2	0
Burton Albion	2015–16	League One	14	0	1	0	2	0	1 (Note: Appearance in Football League Trophy)	0	18	0
Burton Albion	2016–17	Championship	0	0	0	0	1	1	0	0	1	1
Burton Albion	Total		16	0	1	0	3	1	1	0	21	1
Coventry City (loan)	2016–17	League One	18	0	—		—		2 (Note: Appearances in EFL Trophy)	0	20	0
Bury	2017–18	League One	18	0	1	0	1	0	5	1	25	1
Gillingham (loan)	2017–18	League One	15	0	—		—		—		15	0
Gillingham	2018–19	League One	25	5	1	0	1	0	1	0	28	5
Gillingham	Total		40	5	1	0	1	0	1	0	43	5
AFC Wimbledon	2019–20	League One	30	4	2	0	1	0	2	1	35	5
AFC Wimbledon	2020–21	League One	28	1	1	0	1	0	5	0	35	1
AFC Wimbledon	Total		58	5	3	0	2	0	7	1	70	6
Leyton Orient	2021–22	League Two	4	0	0	0	—		1	0	5	0
Solihull Moors (loan)	2021–22	National League	9	0	—		—		2 (Note: Appearances in National League play-offs)	0	11	0
Banbury United	2022–23	National League North	20	0	2	0	—		4 (Note: Appearance in FA Trophy)	0	26	0
Tamworth	2023–24	National League North	12	0	3	0	—		0	0	15	0
Career total			255	12	14	0	10	1	23	2	302	15

== Honours ==
Burton Albion

- Football League One runner-up: 2015–16

Tamworth

- National League North: 2023–24

== Personal life ==
He graduated in 2022 from Staffordshire University with a First class degree in Professional Sports Writing and Broadcasting.
