= Will Nightingale =

English footballer

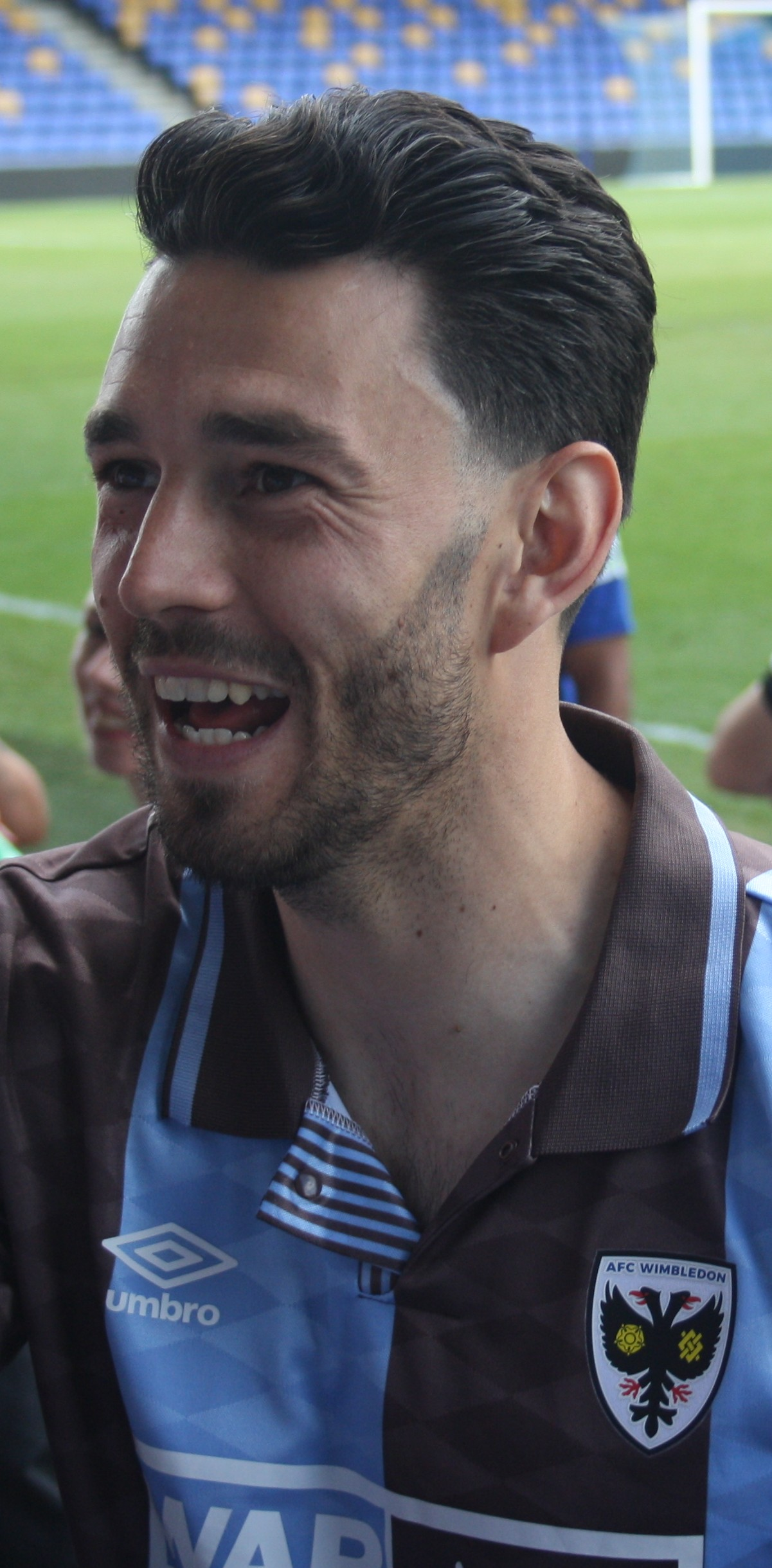
- Nightingale in 2025

Personal information
- Full name: William John Robert Nightingale
- Date of birth: 2 August 1995 (age 31)
- Place of birth: Wandsworth, England
- Height: 6 ft 1 in (1.85 m)
- Position: Defender

Team information
- Current team: Sutton United
- Number: 5

Youth career
- 2004–2014: AFC Wimbledon

Senior career*
Years	Team	Apps	(Gls)
2014–2025	AFC Wimbledon	175	(7)
2023–2025	→ Ross County (loan)	30	(0)
2025–2026	Aldershot Town	36	(3)
2026–	Sutton United	0	(0)
- * Club domestic league appearances and goals as of 19:03, 9 June 2026 (UTC)

William John Robert Nightingale (born 2 August 1995) is an English professional footballer who plays as a centre-back or right-back for National League club Sutton United.

== Career ==
=== AFC Wimbledon ===
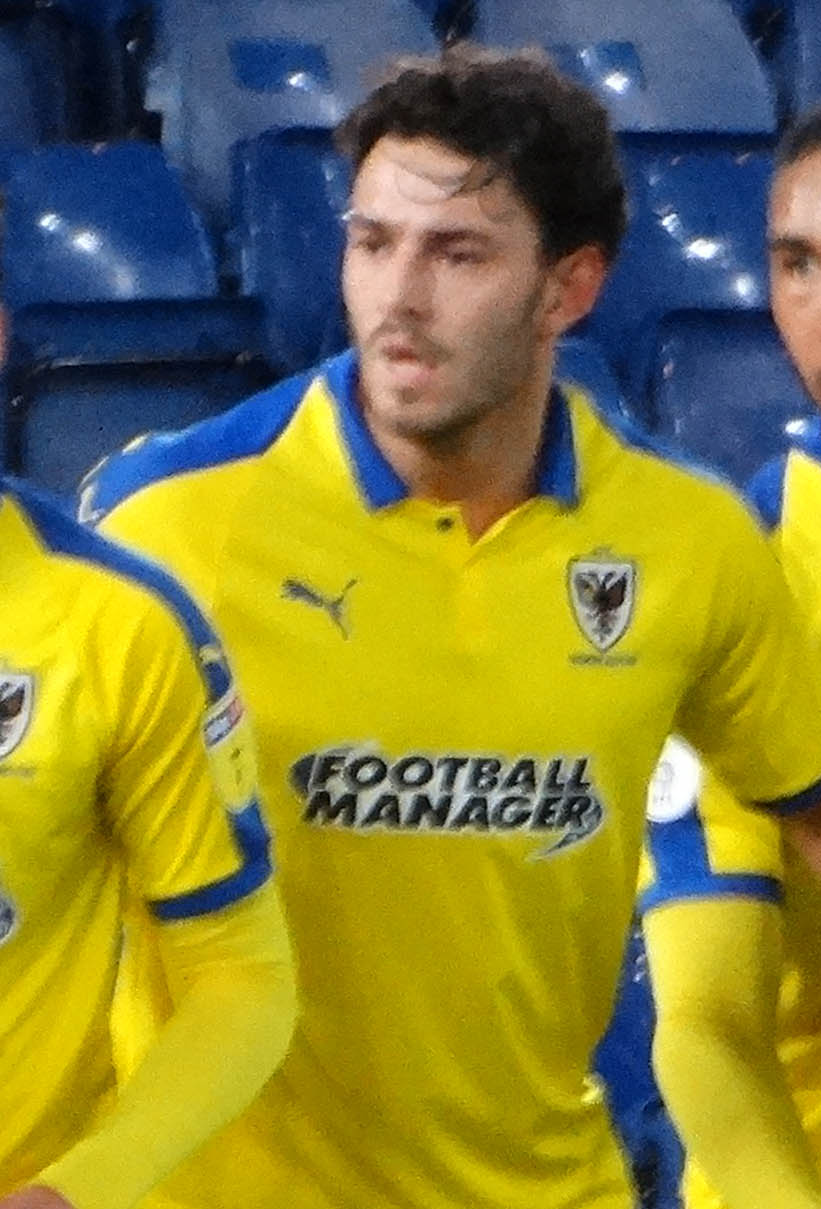
Nightingale in 2018

Nightingale was born in Wandsworth, Greater London. He joined the AFC Wimbledon Academy at the age of nine, progressing through the ranks before making the step up to the first team at the age of 18. His first association with the first team came as an unused substitute in a 2–0 home loss to Torquay United on 11 January 2014. Nightingale was offered his first professional contract with AFC Wimbledon in May 2014.

Nightingale made his first-team debut on 17 January 2015 at the age of 19, coming on as an 89th-minute substitute in a 3–1 home defeat to Carlisle United. He was rewarded by being named in the starting line-up for the following match, a 2–1 home win against Accrington Stanley on 24 January 2015. He was named as the man of the match and was commended by manager Neal Ardley for his performance. He scored his first career goal on 7 April 2018 with a fourth-minute header in a 1–1 draw against Scunthorpe United.

He was named the club's Player of the Season for the 2018–19 campaign, which saw Wimbledon achieve survival despite being ten points adrift of safety in February. On 22 May 2019, he signed a new contract with AFC Wimbledon of an undisclosed length.

On 14 August 2021 during a 3–3 draw against Bolton Wanderers, Nightingale scored the first Wimbledon goal in front of fans at the newly built Plough Lane stadium.

Nightingale moved on loan to Scottish Premiership club Ross County in July 2023. In June 2024, Ross County announced a season-long loan extension for Nightingale, ensuring he stayed at the club for a second consecutive season.

At the end of the 2024-25 season, Nightingale was released by AFC Wimbledon, ending his playing association with a testimonial match on 1 June 2025 at the Cherry Red Records Stadium.

=== Aldershot Town ===
On 5 August 2025, Nightingale joined National League club Aldershot Town.

=== Sutton United ===
On 6 June 2026, Nightingale agreed to join fellow National League club Sutton United.

== Career statistics ==
As of end of 2025–26 season

Appearances and goals by club, season and competition
Club	Season	League			FA Cup		League Cup		Other		Total	
Club	Season	Division	Apps	Goals	Apps	Goals	Apps	Goals	Apps	Goals	Apps	Goals
AFC Wimbledon	2014–15	League Two	4	0	0	0	0	0	0	0	4	0
AFC Wimbledon	2015–16	League Two	4	0	0	0	1	0	1 (Note: Appearance in Football League Trophy)	0	6	0
AFC Wimbledon	2016–17	League One	12	0	0	0	0	0	4 (Note: Appearances in EFL Trophy)	0	16	0
AFC Wimbledon	2017–18	League One	18	1	0	0	1	0	2	0	21	1
AFC Wimbledon	2018–19	League One	39	0	4	0	1	0	2	0	46	0
AFC Wimbledon	2019–20	League One	9	0	0	0	0	0	1	0	10	0
AFC Wimbledon	2020–21	League One	32	2	1	0	0	0	5	0	38	2
AFC Wimbledon	2021–22	League One	35	3	1	0	1	0	1	1	38	4
AFC Wimbledon	2022–23	League Two	22	1	0	0	1	0	2	0	25	1
AFC Wimbledon	Total		175	7	6	0	5	0	18	1	204	8
Ross County (loan)	2023–24	Scottish Premiership	21	0	1	0	4	0	2	0	28	0
Ross County (loan)	2024-25	Scottish Premiership	9	0	0	0	1	0	0	0	10	0
Ross County (loan)	Total		30	0	1	0	5	0	2	0	38	0
Aldershot Town	2025–26	National League	36	3	0	0	—		1 (Note: Appearance(s) in FA Trophy)	0	37	3
Career total			241	10	7	0	10	0	21	1	279	11

== Honours ==
AFC Wimbledon

- Football League Two play-offs: 2016

Individual

- AFC Wimbledon Player of the Year: 2018–19
