= 2019–20 AFC Wimbledon season =

AFC Wimbledon
2019–20 season
- Chairman: Joe Palmer
- Manager: Wally Downes (until 21 October); Glyn Hodges (from 23 October)
- Stadium: Kingsmeadow
- League One: 20th (on PPG)
- FA Cup: First round v Doncaster Rovers (19 November 2019)
- EFL Cup: First round v Milton Keynes (13 August 2019)
- EFL Trophy: Group Stage
- Top goalscorer: League: Marcus Forss (11); All: Marcus Forss (11)
- Highest home attendance: League/All: 4,657 (3 Aug 2019 v Rotherham United, League)
- Lowest home attendance: League: 3,979 (17 Aug 2019 v Accrington Stanley); All: 388 (3 Sep 2019 v Brighton & Hove Albion U21, EFL Trophy Group Stage)
- Average home league attendance: 4,310
Home colours	Away colours	Third colours

The 2019–20 season was the fourth in League One, the third tier of the English football league system, for AFC Wimbledon since their promotion in 2016 from League Two. Along with competing in League One, the Kingston upon Thames-based club participated in three cup competitions, the FA Cup, EFL Cup and EFL Trophy, failing to progress past the first stage of any of them.

== Squad ==
As of 10 April 2020.

Note: Flags indicate national team as defined under FIFA eligibility rules; some limited exceptions apply. Players may hold more than one non-FIFA nationality.

No.	Pos.	Nation	Player
1	GK	ENG	Nathan Trott (on loan from West Ham United)
2	DF	ENG	Luke O'Neill
4	DF	ENG	Rod McDonald
5	DF	ENG	Will Nightingale (captain)
6	DF	ENG	Terell Thomas
7	MF	ENG	Scott Wagstaff (vice-captain)
8	MF	ENG	Anthony Hartigan
9	FW	GHA	Kwesi Appiah
10	FW	WAL	Adam Roscrow
11	MF	ENG	Mitchell Pinnock
12	MF	ENG	Jack Rudoni
17	FW	FRA	Julien Lamy (on loan from Rotherham United)

No.	Pos.	Nation	Player
18	DF	ENG	Nesta Guinness-Walker
19	MF	IRL	Shane McLoughlin
21	GK	ENG	Joe Day (on loan from Cardiff City)
23	MF	ENG	Max Sanders (on loan from Brighton & Hove Albion)
26	DF	DEN	Mads Bech Sørensen (on loan from Brentford)
30	DF	ENG	Paul Kalambayi
32	DF	ENG	Huseyin Biler
33	MF	IRL	Callum Reilly
36	DF	ENG	Reuben Collins
37	DF	ENG	Paul Osew
39	FW	ENG	Joe Pigott
40	MF	ENG	Anthony Wordsworth

== Pre-season ==
Dons announced pre-season friendlies against Wexford, Brentford, Bristol City, 1. FC Kaiserslautern, Kickers Offenbach, Bournemouth, Metropolitan Police, Hampton & Richmond Borough and Crystal Palace.

29 June 2019 Friendly	Wexford	0–1	AFC Wimbledon	Crossabeg, Ireland
14:00 BST		Report	Wood 70'	Stadium: Ferrycarrig Park

5 July 2019 Friendly	AFC Wimbledon	0–3	Brentford	Norbiton
19:45 BST		Report	Nightingale 56' (o.g.); Nørgaard 82'; Watkins 84'	Stadium: Cherry Red Records Stadium

9 July 2019 Friendly	AFC Wimbledon	2–3	Bristol City	Norbiton
19:45 BST	Roscrow 68' (pen.); Folivi 88' (pen.)	Report	Webster 32'; Diédhiou 47', 50'	Stadium: Cherry Red Records Stadium

12 July 2019 Friendly	1. FC Kaiserslautern	1–0	AFC Wimbledon	Weingarten, Germany
19:00 CET	Bjarnason 23'	Report		Stadium: Weingarten Arena

13 July 2019 Friendly	Kickers Offenbach	3–2	AFC Wimbledon	Offenbach am Main, Germany
15:00 CET	Shala 47' (pen.); Trialist 49' (o.g.); Reinhard 90'	Report	Pigott 61'; Wood 85'	Stadium: Sparda-Bank-Hessen-Stadion

16 July 2019 Friendly	AFC Wimbledon	2–3	Bournemouth	Cartagena, Spain
20:00 CEST	Folivi 47' (pen.); Pigott 53'	Report	Wilson 15', 24'; Fraser 78'	Stadium: La Manga Club Football Stadium

20 July 2019 Friendly	AFC Wimbledon	0–2	Plymouth Argyle	Cartagena, Spain
10:30 CEST		Report	Mayor 33'; Grant 40'	Stadium: La Manga Club Football Stadium

23 July 2019 Friendly	Metropolitan Police	1–3	AFC Wimbledon	Molesey
19:45 BST	Mazzone 47' (pen.)	Report	Ness 19' (o.g.); Folivi 25', 28'	Stadium: Imber Court

27 July 2019 Friendly	Hampton & Richmond Borough	1–3	AFC Wimbledon	Hampton
15:00 BST	Ewington 18'	Report	Nightingale 11'; Pigott 60'; O'Neill 74'	Stadium: The Jezzards Beveree Stadium

30 July 2019 Friendly	AFC Wimbledon	2–2	Crystal Palace	Norbiton
19:45 BST	Macnab 69'; Wood 90+2'	Report	Pierrick 32', 74'	Stadium: Cherry Red Records Stadium

== Competitions ==
=== League One ===
==== League table ====
Pos	Team	Pld	W	D	L	GF	GA	GD	Pts	PPG	Promotion, qualification or relegation
16	Lincoln City	35	12	6	17	44	46	−2	42	1.20	
17	Accrington Stanley	35	10	10	15	47	53	−6	40	1.14	
18	Rochdale	34	10	6	18	39	57	−18	36	1.06	
19	Milton Keynes Dons	35	10	7	18	36	47	−11	37	1.06	
20	AFC Wimbledon	35	8	11	16	39	52	−13	35	1.00	
21	Tranmere Rovers (R)	34	8	8	18	36	60	−24	32	0.94	Relegation to EFL League Two
22	Southend United (R)	35	4	7	24	39	85	−46	19	0.54	Relegation to EFL League Two
23	Bolton Wanderers (R)	34	5	11	18	27	66	−39	14 (Note: Bolton Wanderers deducted 12 points for entering administration.)	0.41	Relegation to EFL League Two
24	Bury (E, R)	0	0	0	0	0	0	0	−12 (Note: Bury deducted 12 points for entering into an insolvency event, before later being expelled from the EFL on 27 August 2019. At the time of their expulsion, they had played no matches.)	—	Club expelled

Source: EFL Official Website
Rules for classification: 1) Points per game; 2) Goal difference; 3) Number of goals scored; 4) Head-to-head results; 5) Wins; 6) Away goals; 7) Penalty points (sec 9.5); 8) 12-point sending-off offences
(E) Eliminated; (R) Relegated

==== Results summary ====
Overall								Home						Away					
Pld	W	D	L	GF	GA	GD	Pts	W	D	L	GF	GA	GD	W	D	L	GF	GA	GD
35	8	11	16	39	52	−13	35	5	9	4	18	18	0	3	2	12	21	34	−13

Last updated: 7 March 2020.
Source: BBC

==== Results by matchday ====
Matchday	1	2	3	4	5	6	7	8	9	10	11	12	13	14	15	16	17	18	19	20	21	22	23	24	25	26	27	28	29	30	31	32	33	34	35
Ground	H	A	H	A	A	H	A	H	A	H	A	H	A	H	A	H	A	H	A	H	A	A	H	H	A	H	H	A	H	H	A	A	H	H	H
Result	L	L	D	L	L	D	L	D	L	L	L	W	W	W	L	D	L	W	D	W	L	W	L	D	L	W	D	L	L	D	D	L	D	W	D
Position	16	18	18	20	20	21	21	21	21	22	22	21	21	21	21	20	20	19	19	19	19	18	19	19	19	19	19	20	20	20	20	20	20	19	20

Updated to match(es) played on 7 March 2020. Source: afcwimbledon.co.uk
A = Away; H = Home; W = Win; D = Draw; L = Loss

==== Matches ====
On Thursday, 20 June 2019, the EFL League One fixtures were revealed.

3 August 2019 1	AFC Wimbledon	1–2	Rotherham United	Norbiton
15:00 BST	Pigott 50'; Reilly (yellow card) 89'	Report	Ladapo 29'; Robertson 84'	Stadium: Cherry Red Records Stadium; Attendance: 4,657; Referee: Brett Huxtable

10 August 2019 2	Fleetwood Town	2–1	AFC Wimbledon	Fleetwood
15:00 BST	Rossiter (yellow card) 39'; Madden 56'; Morris 65'	Report	Appiah (yellow card) 19', (goal) 26'; Pinnock (yellow card) 39'; Thomas (yellow card) 62'	Stadium: Highbury Stadium; Attendance: 2,684; Referee: Tom Nield

17 August 2019 3	AFC Wimbledon	1–1	Accrington Stanley	Norbiton
15:00 BST	O'Neill 42'; Wagstaff (yellow card) 56'	Report	Francis-Angol (yellow card) 55' (yellow-red card) 61'; Hughes (yellow card) 56'; Bishop 64'	Stadium: Cherry Red Records Stadium; Attendance: 3,979; Referee: John Busby

20 August 2019 4	Ipswich Town	2–1	AFC Wimbledon	Ipswich
19:45 BST	Donacien (yellow card) 47'; Norwood 81'; Jackson 90+4'	Report	Guinness-Walker 41'; O'Neill (yellow card) 50'; Kalambayi (yellow card) 63'; Wagstaff (yellow card) 81'; Pigott (yellow card) 90+4'	Stadium: Portman Road; Attendance: 18,778; Referee: Antony Coggins

24 August 2019 5	Sunderland	3–1	AFC Wimbledon	Sunderland
15:00 BST	Maguire 8', 53', 79'; Power (yellow card) 36'	Report	Appiah 34', (yellow card) 66'	Stadium: Stadium of Light; Attendance: 29,725; Referee: Anthony Backhouse

31 August 2019 6	AFC Wimbledon	0–0	Wycombe Wanderers	Norbiton
15:00 BST	Reilly (yellow card) 75'; Guinness-Walker (yellow card) 84'; Kalambayi (yellow card) 90+5'	Report		Stadium: The Cherry Red Records Stadium; Attendance: 4,521; Referee: Alan Young

7 September 2019 7	Milton Keynes Dons	2–1	AFC Wimbledon	Denbigh
12:00 BST	Nombe 10'; Healey 26'	Report	Forss 83'	Stadium: Stadium mk Attendance: 8,627; Referee: Ben Toner
Note: Live on Sky Sports

14 September 2019 8	AFC Wimbledon	1–1	Shrewsbury Town	Norbiton
15:00 BST	Ebanks-Landell 31' (o.g.); Guinness-Walker (yellow card) 45'	Report	Cummings 73'	Stadium: The Cherry Red Records Stadium; Attendance: 4,084; Referee: Graham Salisbury

17 September 2019 9	Coventry City	2–1	AFC Wimbledon	Bordesley
19:45 BST	Hiwula 27'; Dabo (yellow card) 82'; Walsh 90+3'	Report	Forss 8' (pen.) (yellow card) 31'; Guinness-Walker (yellow card) 51'	Stadium: St Andrew's Trillion Trophy Stadium; Attendance: 5,239; Referee: Trevor Kettle

21 September 2019 10	AFC Wimbledon	1–3	Bristol Rovers	Norbiton
15:00 BST	Forss 20' (yellow card) 21' (yellow-red card) 66'; Folivi (yellow card) 61'; Delaney (yellow card) 64'	Report	Ogogo 29'; Davies (yellow card) 64'; Clarke-Harris 75'; Craig 87'	Stadium: The Cherry Red Records Stadium; Attendance: 4,268; Referee: Nick Kinseley

28 September 2019 11	Peterborough United	3–2	AFC Wimbledon	Peterborough
15:00 BST	Maddison 29'; Eisa 41', 66'	Report	Appiah (yellow card) 23'; Delaney (yellow card) 33'; O'Neill (yellow card) 38'; Reilly (yellow card) 44'; Wordsworth (yellow card) 50' (goal) 78'; Pinnock 52'	Stadium: Weston Homes Stadium; Attendance: 6,744; Referee: Sebastian Stockbridge

5 October 2019 12	AFC Wimbledon	3–2	Rochdale	Norbiton
15:00 BST	Forss 2'; Osew 16'; Pinnock 28'; Wordsworth (yellow card) 45+1'	Report	Henderson 66', 90+5'; Wilbraham (yellow card) 70'	Stadium: The Cherry Red Records Stadium; Attendance: 4,068; Referee: James Oldham

12 October 2019 13	Southend United	1–4	AFC Wimbledon	Southend-on-Sea
15:00 BST	Dieng 13' (yellow card) 81'; Kiernan (yellow card) 51'; McLaughlin (yellow card) 70'	Report	Forss 5', 11', 52' (pen.); Wordsworth (yellow card) 45+1'; Kalambayi (yellow card) 54'; Delaney 72'; Pinnock (yellow card) 84'	Stadium: Roots Hall; Attendance: 6,420; Referee: Simon Hooper

19 October 2019 14	AFC Wimbledon	1–0	Portsmouth	Norbiton
15:00 BST	Wagstaff (yellow card) 88'; Thomas 90+3'	Report	Brown (yellow card) 35'; Marquis (yellow card) 40'; Raggett (yellow card) 83'	Stadium: The Cherry Red Records Stadium; Attendance: 4,525; Referee: Sam Purkiss

22 October 2019 15	Burton Albion	1–0	AFC Wimbledon	Burton-upon-Trent
19:45 BST	Templeton 31'; O'Toole (yellow card) 57'	Report	Kalambayi (yellow card) 22'	Stadium: Pirelli Stadium; Attendance: 2,223; Referee: Darren Handley

2 November 2019 16	AFC Wimbledon	1–1	Lincoln City	Norbiton
15:00 BST	Pinnock (yellow card) 45+2'; Kalambayi (yellow card) 61'; Wagstaff (yellow card) 89'; Appiah 90+2'	Report	Payne 31'; Toffolo (yellow card) 62'; Morrell (yellow card) 89'	Stadium: The Cherry Red Records Stadium; Attendance: 4,378; Referee: James Linington

16 November 2019 17	Blackpool	2–0	AFC Wimbledon	Blackpool
15:00 GMT	Gnanduillet 51', 81'	Report	O'Neill (yellow card) 28'; Pigott (yellow card) 41'	Stadium: Bloomfield Road; Attendance: 7,588; Referee: Andy Haines

23 November 2019 18	AFC Wimbledon	1–0	Gillingham	Norbiton
15:00 GMT	Pinnock (yellow card) 7'; Wagstaff 19'; Piggott (yellow card) 45'; Delaney (yellow card) 83'; Appiah (yellow card) 90+4'	Report	Ogilvie (yellow card) 3'; Byrne (yellow card) 85'; Pringle (red card) 90+3'	Stadium: The Cherry Red Records Stadium; Attendance: 4,554; Referee: Kevin Johnson

7 December 2019 19	Bolton Wanderers	2–2	AFC Wimbledon	Horwich
15:00 GMT	Murphy 56'; Dodoo 90+5'	Report	Forss 41', 81'; Sanders (yellow card) 62'	Stadium: University of Bolton Stadium; Attendance: 11,501; Referee: Marc Edwards

14 December 2019 20	AFC Wimbledon	2–1	Doncaster Rovers	Norbiton
15:00 GMT	Forss 56' (pen.); Reilly 70'	Report	Thomas 12'; Sadlier (yellow card) 41'; Daniels (yellow card) 56'; Sheaf (yellow card) 90+3'	Stadium: The Cherry Red Records Stadium; Attendance: 4,311; Referee: Nick Kinseley

21 December 2019 21	Tranmere Rovers	1–0	AFC Wimbledon	Birkenhead
15:00 GMT	Hepburn-Murphy 26'; Nelson (yellow card) 48'; Perkins (yellow card) 90+3'	Report		Stadium: Prenton Park; Attendance: 6,285; Referee: Scott Oldham

26 December 2019 22	Bristol Rovers	1–2	AFC Wimbledon	Bristol
15:00 GMT	Craig (yellow card) 30'; Clarke-Harris 43' (pen.); Menayese (yellow card) 77'	Report	O'Neill (yellow card) 66'; Forss 70'; Rudoni (yellow card) 80'; McLoughlin (yellow card) 82'; Pigott 84'	Stadium: Memorial Stadium; Attendance: 9,096; Referee: Robert Lewis

29 December 2019 23	AFC Wimbledon	1–2	Oxford United	Norbiton
15:00 GMT	Guinness-Walker (yellow card) 45+1'; Pigott 47'; Rudoni (yellow card) 84'	Report	Brannagan (yellow card) 7'; McLoughlin 26' (o.g.); Sykes 61'	Stadium: The Cherry Red Records Stadium; Attendance: 4,763; Referee: Sam Purkiss

1 January 2020 24	AFC Wimbledon	1–1	Southend United	Norbiton
15:00 GMT	Reilly 23'	Report	Hopper (yellow card) 85'; Kelman 90+1' (pen.) (yellow card) 90+2'	Stadium: The Cherry Red Records Stadium; Attendance: 4,422; Referee: Craig Hicks

4 January 2020	Rochdale	v	AFC Wimbledon	Spotland
15:00 GMT		Report		Stadium: Crown Oil Arena
Note: The match was postponed on 23 December, due to Rochdale's involvement in the FA Cup.

11 January 2020 25	Portsmouth	2–1	AFC Wimbledon	Milton
15:00 GMT	Harness 20'; Cannon (yellow card) 70'; Marquis 79'	Report	Pigott 62'; Reilly (yellow card) 72'; Wagstaff (yellow card) 74' (yellow-red card) 84'; O'Neill (yellow card) 90+4'	Stadium: Fratton Park; Attendance: 18,417; Referee: Trevor Kettle

18 January 2020 26	AFC Wimbledon	1–0	Peterborough United	Norbiton
15:00 BST	Pigott 58'; Trott (yellow card) 78'	Report	Szmodics (yellow card) 74'; Toney (yellow card) 85'	Stadium: The Cherry Red Records Stadium; Attendance: 4,453; Referee: Darren Drysdale

28 January 2020 27	AFC Wimbledon	2–2	Burton Albion	Norbiton
19:45 GMT	Pinnock 16'; Hartigan (yellow card) 56'; Reilly 60'; Rudoni (yellow card) 69'	Report	Powell 7'; Quinn (yellow card) 28'; Murphy 41'	Stadium: The Cherry Red Records Stadium; Attendance: 3,674; Referee: John Busby

1 February 2020 28	Accrington Stanley	2–1	AFC Wimbledon	Accrington
15:00 GMT	Clark 14'; Charles 21'; Pritchard (yellow card) 28' (yellow-red card) 55'	Report	Pigott 73'	Stadium: Wham Stadium; Attendance: 2,224; Referee: James Oldham

8 February 2020 29	AFC Wimbledon	1–2	Fleetwood Town	Norbiton
15:00 GMT	McLoughlin 34'; Lamy (yellow card) 90'	Report	Connolly (yellow card) 9'; O'Neill 22' (o.g.); Madden 81'; Evans (yellow card) 86'	Stadium: The Cherry Red Records Stadium; Attendance: 4,097; Referee: David Rock

11 February 2020 30	AFC Wimbledon	0–0	Ipswich Town	Norbiton
19:45 GMT	Reilly (yellow card) 39'	Report	Downes (yellow card) 69'	Stadium: The Cherry Red Records Stadium; Attendance: 4,745; Referee: Craig Hicks

15 February 2020 31	Rotherham United	2–2	AFC Wimbledon	Rotherham
15:00 GMT	Crooks 60'; Ladapo 81'	Report	Sanders 30'; O'Neill (yellow card) 76'; Rudoni (yellow card) 87'; Appiah 90+3' (pen.)	Stadium: AESSEAL New York Stadium; Attendance: 8,626; Referee: Michael Salisbury

18 February 2020 32	Oxford United	5–0	AFC Wimbledon	Oxford
19:45 GMT	Taylor 32', 90+3'; Holland 34', 55'; Henry 50'	Report	Guinness-Walker (yellow card) 72'	Stadium: Kassam Stadium; Attendance: 6,155; Referee: Sam Purkiss

22 February 2020 33	AFC Wimbledon	0–0	Blackpool	Norbiton
15:00 GMT		Report	Dewsbury-Hall (yellow card) 50'	Stadium: Cherry Red Records Stadium; Attendance: 4,593; Referee: Neil Hair

29 February 2020 34	Gillingham	1–2	AFC Wimbledon	Gillingham
15:00 GMT	Charles-Cook 87'	Report	Pigott 49'; Roscrow (yellow card) 78'; O'Neill (yellow card) 82'; Reilly 90+1'	Stadium: Priestfield Stadium; Attendance: 4,893; Referee: John Busby

7 March 2020 35	AFC Wimbledon	0–0	Bolton Wanderers	Norbiton
15:00 GMT		Report		Stadium: Cherry Red Records Stadium; Attendance: 4,804; Referee: Marc Edwards

14 March 2020	Doncaster Rovers	v	AFC Wimbledon	Doncaster
15:00 GMT				Stadium: Keepmoat Stadium
Note: Season was suspended until 3 April 2020, due to the COVID-19 pandemic.

21 March 2020	AFC Wimbledon	v	Tranmere Rovers	Norbiton
15:00 GMT				Stadium: The Cherry Red Records Stadium
Note: Season was suspended until 3 April 2020, due to the COVID-19 pandemic.

24 March 2020	Rochdale	v	AFC Wimbledon	Spotland
19:45 GMT				Stadium: Crown Oil Arena
Note: Season was suspended until 3 April 2020, due to the COVID-19 pandemic.

28 March 2020	Lincoln City	v	AFC Wimbledon	Lincoln
15:00 GMT				Stadium: Sincil Bank
Note: Season was suspended until 3 April 2020, due to the COVID-19 pandemic.

10 April 2020	AFC Wimbledon	v	Sunderland	Norbiton
15:00 BST				Stadium: Cherry Red Records Stadium
Note: On 3 April, the English Football League decided to postpone all football until safe to do so due to the COVID-19 pandemic.

13 April 2020	Wycombe Wanderers	v	AFC Wimbledon	High Wycombe
15:00 BST				Stadium: Adams Park
Note: On 3 April, the English Football League decided to postpone all football until safe to do so due to the COVID-19.

18 April 2020	AFC Wimbledon	v	Milton Keynes Dons	Norbiton
15:00 BST				Stadium: Cherry Red Records Stadium
Note: On 3 April, the English Football League decided to postpone all football until safe to do so due to the COVID-19.

25 April 2020	Shrewsbury Town	v	AFC Wimbledon	Shrewsbury
15:00 BST				Stadium: Montgomery Waters Meadow
Note: On 3 April, the English Football League decided to postpone all football due to the COVID-19 pandemic.

3 May 2020	AFC Wimbledon	v	Coventry City	Norbiton
15:00 BST				Stadium: Cherry Red Records Stadium
Note: On 3 April, the English Football League decided to postpone all football due to the COVID-19 pandemic.

=== FA Cup ===
The first round draw was made on 21 October 2019.

9 November 2019 First round	AFC Wimbledon	1–1	Doncaster Rovers	Norbiton
15:00 GMT	Pigott 43'; Pinnock (yellow card) 66'	Report	Wright (yellow card) 50'; Anderson 63'; Amos (yellow card) 88'	Stadium: The Cherry Red Records Stadium; Attendance: 2,777; Referee: Darren Drysdale

19 November 2019 First round replay	Doncaster Rovers	2–0	AFC Wimbledon	Doncaster
19:45 GMT	Coppinger 52'; Bingham 70'	Report		Stadium: Keepmoat Stadium; Attendance: 3,413; Referee: Chris Sarginson

=== EFL Cup ===
The first round draw was made on 20 June.

13 August 2019 First round	AFC Wimbledon	2–2 (2–4 p)	Milton Keynes Dons	Norbiton
19:45 BST	Wagstaff 8'; Pigott (penalty missed) 61'; O'Neill 90+4'	Report	McGrandles (penalty missed) 3' 16'; Kasumu 50'; Brittain (yellow card) 74'	Stadium: Cherry Red Records Stadium; Attendance: 2,191; Referee: Craig Hicks
	Penalties
	O'Neill (penalty scored); Reilly (penalty missed); Hartigan (penalty scored); Pigott (penalty missed)		Poole (penalty scored); Martin (penalty scored); Cargill (penalty missed); McGrandles (penalty scored); Gilbey (penalty scored)

=== EFL Trophy ===
On 9 July 2019, the pre-determined group stage draw was announced with Invited clubs to be drawn on 12 July 2019.

Pos	Div	Team	Pld	W	PW	PL	L	GF	GA	GD	Pts	Qualification
1	ACA	Brighton & Hove Albion U21	3	2	0	1	0	5	1	+4	7	Advance to Round 2
2	L2	Leyton Orient	3	1	1	0	1	3	4	−1	5	Advance to Round 2
3	L1	AFC Wimbledon	3	1	0	0	2	4	5	−1	3	
4	L1	Southend United	3	1	0	0	2	3	5	−2	3	

Source: EFL.com

3 September 2019 Group stage	AFC Wimbledon	0–2	Brighton & Hove Albion U21	Norbiton
19:30 BST		Report	Tzanev 52' (o.g.); Radulović Samouković 89'; Richards (yellow card) 90'	Stadium: The Cherry Red Records Stadium; Attendance: 388; Referee: Lee Swabey

8 October 2019 Group stage	AFC Wimbledon	3–0	Leyton Orient	Norbiton
19:30 BST	Pigott 3' (pen.); Folivi 49'; Reilly (yellow card) 75' (goal) 79'	Report	Ogie (yellow card) 36'; Gorman (penalty missed) 72' (yellow card) 84'	Stadium: The Cherry Red Records Stadium; Attendance: 642; Referee: Charles Breakspear

13 November 2019 Group stage	Southend United	3–1	AFC Wimbledon	Southend-on-Sea
19:45 GMT	Ralph 25'; Hamilton 45+1'; Hopper 80'	Report	Madelin (yellow card) 24'; Wood 35'	Stadium: Roots Hall; Attendance: 717; Referee: Will Finnie

== Transfers ==
=== Transfers in ===
Date	Position	Nationality	Name	From	Fee	Ref.
1 July 2019	LB	(England)	Nesta Guinness-Walker	(England) Metropolitan Police	Undisclosed	
1 July 2019	FW	(Wales)	Adam Roscrow	(Wales) Cardiff Metropolitan University	Undisclosed	
4 July 2019	RB	(England)	Luke O'Neill	(England) Gillingham	Free transfer	
26 July 2019	CM	(Republic of Ireland)	Callum Reilly	(England) Gillingham	Free transfer	

=== Loans in ===
Date from	Position	Nationality	Name	From	Date until	Ref.
1 July 2019	GK	(England)	Nathan Trott	(England) West Ham United	30 June 2020	
9 July 2019	CF	(England)	Michael Folivi	(England) Watford	January 2020	
2 September 2019	CB	(Republic of Ireland)	Ryan Delaney	(England) Rochdale	6 January 2020	
2 September 2019	CF	(Finland)	Marcus Forss	(England) Brentford	30 June 2020	
2 September 2019	CM	(England)	Max Sanders	(England) Brighton & Hove Albion	30 June 2020	
9 January 2020	CB	(Denmark)	Mads Bech Sørensen	(England) Brentford	30 June 2020	
28 January 2020	GK	(England)	Joe Day	(Wales) Cardiff City	30 June 2020	
31 January 2020	LW	(France)	Julien Lamy	(England) Rotherham United	30 June 2020	

=== Loans out ===
Date from	Position	Nationality	Name	To	Date until	Ref.
30 August 2019	AM	(England)	Ayoub Assal	(England) Metropolitan Police	October 2019	
2 September 2019	AM	(Republic of Ireland)	Dylan Connolly	(England) Bradford City	30 June 2020	
6 September 2019	CF	(England)	Tommy Wood	(England) Leatherhead	4 October 2019	
6 September 2019	CB	(England)	Reuben Collins	(England) Basingstoke Town	7 October 2019	
6 September 2019	FW	(England)	Zach Robinson	(England) Basingstoke Town	7 October 2019	
15 November 2019	GK	(New Zealand)	Nik Tzanev	(England) Sutton United	1 January 2020	
24 January 2020	MF	(England)	Ossama Ashley	(England) Billericay Town	February 2020	
21 February 2020	CF	(England)	Tommy Wood	(England) Tonbridge Angels	March 2020	
28 February 2020	DF	(Wales)	Jack Madelin	(England) Walton Casuals	25 April 2020	

=== Transfers out ===
Date	Position	Nationality	Name	To	Fee	Ref.
1 July 2019	LW	(England)	Andy Barcham	Free agent	Released	
1 July 2019	MF	(England)	Tyler Burey	(England) Millwall	Compensation	
1 July 2019	AM	(Bermuda)	Kane Crichlow	(England) Watford	Released	
1 July 2019	MF	(England)	Alfie Egan	Free agent	Released	
1 July 2019	CF	(England)	James Hanson	(England) Grimsby Town	Mutual consent	
1 July 2019	GK	(England)	Joe McDonnell	(England) Notts County	Released	
1 July 2019	DF	(England)	James O'Halloran	Free agent	Released	
1 July 2019	CB	(England)	Deji Oshilaja	(England) Charlton Athletic	Released	
1 July 2019	CM	(England)	Tom Soares	(England) Stevenage	Released	
1 July 2019	DF	(England)	Osaze Urhoghide	(England) Sheffield Wednesday	Released	
2 July 2019	RB	(England)	Toby Sibbick	(England) Barnsley	Undisclosed	
2 September 2019	RW	(Albania)	Egli Kaja	(England) Northampton Town	Free transfer	

== Player statistics ==
=== Appearances and goals ===
No.	Pos	Nat	Player	Total		League One		FA Cup		EFL Cup		EFL Trophy	
No.	Pos	Nat	Player	Apps	Goals	Apps	Goals	Apps	Goals	Apps	Goals	Apps	Goals
1	GK	(England) ENG	Nathan Trott	26	0	23	0	2	0	0	0	1	0
2	DF	(England) ENG	Luke O'Neill	34	2	30+1	1	2	0	1	1	0	0
4	DF	(England) ENG	Rod McDonald	16	0	11+4	0	0	0	0+1	0	0	0
5	DF	(England) ENG	Will Nightingale	10	0	8+1	0	0	0	0	0	1	0
6	DF	(England) ENG	Terell Thomas	36	1	31	1	2	0	1	0	2	0
7	MF	(England) ENG	Scott Wagstaff	30	2	23+3	1	2	0	1	1	1	0
8	MF	(England) ENG	Anthony Hartigan	32	0	20+7	0	2	0	1	0	2	0
9	FW	(Ghana) GHA	Kwesi Appiah	23	4	9+10	4	2	0	1	0	1	0
10	FW	(Wales) WAL	Adam Roscrow	11	0	0+10	0	0	0	0	0	1	0
11	MF	(England) ENG	Mitchell Pinnock	29	3	17+8	3	2	0	0	0	2	0
12	MF	(England) ENG	Jack Rudoni	13	0	8+3	0	0	0	0	0	1+1	0
13	GK	(New Zealand) NZL	Nik Tzanev	4	0	2	0	0	0	1	0	1	0
14	DF	(England) ENG	Kyron Stabana	3	0	0	0	0	0	0	0	2+1	0
15	FW	(Finland) FIN	Marcus Forss	19	11	17+1	11	0	0	0	0	0+1	0
16	MF	(Republic of Ireland) IRL	Dylan Connolly	4	0	0+3	0	0	0	1	0	0	0
17	FW	(England) ENG	Michael Folivi	13	1	6+4	0	0	0	0+1	0	2	1
17	FW	(France) FRA	Julien Lamy	2	0	1+1	0	0	0	0	0	0	0
18	DF	(England) ENG	Nesta Guinness-Walker	27	1	19+4	1	1	0	1	0	1+1	0
19	MF	(Republic of Ireland) IRL	Shane McLoughlin	26	1	14+9	1	1+1	0	0	0	1	0
20	MF	(England) ENG	Ossama Ashley	0	0	0	0	0	0	0	0	0	0
21	MF	(Albania) ALB	Egli Kaja	0	0	0	0	0	0	0	0	0	0
21	DF	(Republic of Ireland) IRL	Ryan Delaney	16	1	13+1	1	1	0	0	0	1	0
21	GK	(England) ENG	Joe Day	9	0	9	0	0	0	0	0	0	0
22	FW	(England) ENG	Tommy Wood	4	1	0+2	0	0	0	0	0	1+1	1
23	MF	(England) ENG	Max Sanders	21	1	18+2	1	0	0	0	0	1	0
24	GK	(England) ENG	Joe McDonnell	2	0	1	0	0	0	0	0	1	0
25	DF	(England) ENG	Jamil Awoyejo	1	0	0	0	0	0	0	0	0+1	0
26	DF	(Denmark) DEN	Mads Bech Sørensen	9	0	9	0	0	0	0	0	0	0
28	FW	(England) ENG	David Fisher	0	0	0	0	0	0	0	0	0	0
29	FW	(England) ENG	Zach Robinson	1	0	0	0	0	0	0	0	0+1	0
30	DF	(England) ENG	Paul Kalambayi	22	0	16	0	1+1	0	1	0	3	0
31	DF	(Wales) WAL	Jack Madelin	2	0	0+1	0	0	0	0	0	1	0
32	DF	(England) ENG	Huseyin Biler	0	0	0	0	0	0	0	0	0	0
33	MF	(Republic of Ireland) IRL	Callum Reilly	35	5	28+2	4	1+1	0	1	0	2	1
34	MF	(England) ENG	Finlay Macnab	1	0	0	0	0	0	0	0	0+1	0
35	DF	(England) ENG	Archie Procter	0	0	0	0	0	0	0	0	0	0
36	DF	(England) ENG	Reuben Collins	0	0	0	0	0	0	0	0	0	0
37	DF	(England) ENG	Paul Osew	23	1	15+3	1	2	0	0+1	0	2	0
38	MF	(England) ENG	Ayoub Assal	1	0	0	0	0	0	0	0	1	0
39	FW	(England) ENG	Joe Pigott	39	9	31+3	7	2	1	1	0	1+1	1
40	MF	(England) ENG	Anthony Wordsworth	10	1	6+4	1	0	0	0	0	0	0
41	GK	(England) ENG	Matthew Cox	0	0	0	0	0	0	0	0	0	0
