= Paul Osew =

English footballer

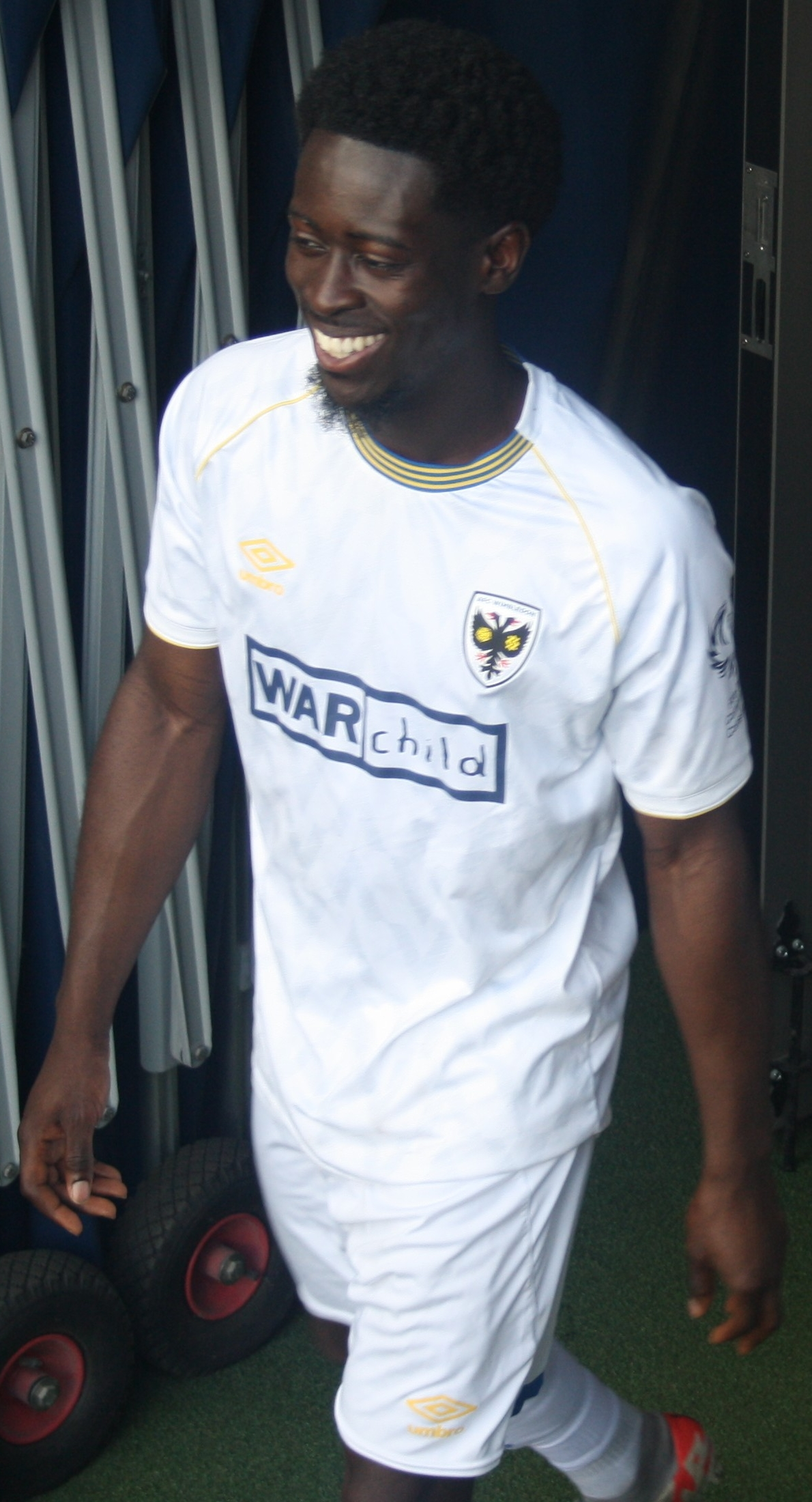
- Osew in 2025.

Personal information
- Full name: Paul Asiedu Osew
- Date of birth: 25 November 2000 (age 25)
- Place of birth: Wandsworth, England
- Position: Left back

Team information
- Current team: Walton & Hersham
- Number: 37

Youth career
- 2008–2010: Chelsea Kicks
- 2010–2011: Evolution Sports & Health Academy
- 2011–2014: Brentford
- 2015–2019: AFC Wimbledon

Senior career*
Years	Team	Apps	(Gls)
2017	Raynes Park Vale	2	(0)
2019–2023	AFC Wimbledon	59	(1)
2023	Northampton Town	4	(0)
2023–2024	Woking	5	(1)
2024	Welling United	6	(0)
2025–2026	Bangor	5	(0)
2026	Tonbridge Angels	3	(0)
2026–	Walton & Hersham	4	(1)
- * Club domestic league appearances and goals as of 09:46, 7 October 2026 (UTC)

Paul Asiedu Osew (born 25 November 2000) is an English professional footballer who plays as a left back for National League South club Walton & Hersham.

Osew is a product of the Brentford and AFC Wimbledon academies and played in the English Football League for the latter club between 2019 and 2023. Following a short spell with Northampton Town, he dropped into non-League football in 2023 and briefly played in Northern Ireland.

== Career ==
=== Early years ===
Osew began his youth career with spells as Chelsea Kicks and in the Evolution Sports & Health Academy. Following a rejection by Chelsea Academy for being "too small", he joined the Brentford academy at the age of 11. At age 15, Osew signed a scholarship deal with AFC Wimbledon, after previously being a part of the club's Foundation's College Education programme. During his time in the club's youth system, he was converted from a forward to a left back. During the first month of the 2017–18 season, Osew played the first senior matches of his career for Combined Counties League First Division club Raynes Park Vale, on an ad-hoc basis.

=== AFC Wimbledon ===
After progressing into AFC Wimbledon's U23 team during the 2018–19 season, Osew signed his first professional contract with the League One club in April 2019. He was a regular inclusion in the first team squad during the truncated 2019–20 season and by the time his season was ended by a stress fracture to his tibia in March 2020, he had made 23 appearances and scored one goal. On 8 January 2020, Osew signed a contract extension and made 14 appearances during the 2020–21 season, scoring one goal. He improved his tally to 32 appearances during the 2021–22 season, which culminated in relegation to League Two. Osew proved his versatility as a utility player in defence and midfield during the season and scored one goal, with the only goal of an EFL Cup first round win over Charlton Athletic on 10 August 2022.

Osew was offered a new two-year contract in May 2022, but delayed signing it until 21 August 2022, due to a need to recover from injury. He returned to match play six days later and following six appearances, he was sidelined for two months with an ankle injury. Osew failed to appear again before agreeing a mutual termination of his contract on 1 February 2023. He made 76 appearances and scored three goals during 3 1/2 years as a professional with the club.

=== Northampton Town ===
Following a period training with the Chelsea Development Squad, Osew transferred to League Two club Northampton Town on 10 March 2023 and signed a contract running until the end of the 2022–23 season. He made four appearances during the remainder of the club's promotion-winning season and was released when his contract expired.

=== Non-League football ===
On 8 December 2023, Osew joined National League club Woking on a contract running until the end of the 2023–24 season. He made six appearances during the remainder of the season, scoring one goal, which came with the winner on his league debut, in a 2–1 victory over Dorking Wanderers on 16 December. Osew departed the Kingfield Stadium when his contract expired.

Following trials with clubs in Germany and Belgium, Osew signed signed an undisclosed-length contract with National League South club Welling United on 27 September 2024. After making 9 appearances, he was made available for transfer on 9 December.

=== Bangor ===
Following a successful trial, Osew signed an undisclosed-length contract with NIFL Premiership club Bangor on 5 August 2025. He made seven appearances prior to his departure in January 2026.

=== Return to non-League football ===
After nearly seven months without a club, Osew joined National League South club Tonbridge Angels prior to the beginning of the 2026–27 season. He made three appearances before transferring across the division to Walton & Hersham in September 2026.

== Personal life ==
Born in England, Osew is of Ghanaian descent. He attended Sudbourne Primary School, Brixton and Southfields Academy, Southfields. Osew is a drummer and as of February 2022, was playing in church on Sundays. In March 2022, he became an ambassador for the AFC Wimbledon Education Hub at Plough Lane. While playing for Bangor, Osew lived in Donaghadee.

== Career statistics ==
As of match played 6 October 2026

Appearances and goals by club, season and competition
Club	Season	League			National cup (Note: Includes FA Cup, Irish Cup)		League cup (Note: Includes EFL Cup, Northern Ireland League Cup)		Other		Total	
Club	Season	Division	Apps	Goals	Apps	Goals	Apps	Goals	Apps	Goals	Apps	Goals
Raynes Park Vale	2017–18	Combined Counties League First Division	2	0	―		―		―		2	0
AFC Wimbledon	2019–20	League One	18	1	2	0	1	0	2 (Note: Appearance(s) in EFL Trophy)	0	23	1
AFC Wimbledon	2020–21	League One	10	0	0	0	0	0	4	1	14	1
AFC Wimbledon	2021–22	League One	27	0	2	0	2	1	1	0	32	1
AFC Wimbledon	2022–23	League Two	4	0	0	0	0	0	2	0	6	0
AFC Wimbledon	Total		59	1	4	0	3	1	9	1	75	3
Northampton Town	2022–23	League Two	4	0	―		―		―		4	0
Woking	2023–24	National League	5	1	―		―		1 (Note: Appearance in FA Trophy)	0	6	1
Welling United	2024–25	National League South	6	0	―		―		3 (Note: 1 appearance in FA Trophy, 1 appearance in Kent Senior Cup, 1 appearance in London Senior Cup)	0	9	0
Bangor	2025–26	NIFL Premiership	5	0	0	0	1	0	1 (Note: Appearance in County Antrim Shield)	0	7	0
Tonbridge Angels	2026–27	National League South	3	0	―		―		―		3	0
Walton & Hersham	2026–27	National League South	4	1	1	0	―		0	0	5	1
Career total			88	3	5	0	4	1	14	1	111	5
