= Jamil Awoyejo =

English footballer

Personal information
- Full name: Jamil Tyrique Daniel Awoyejo
- Date of birth: 21 June 2001 (age 25)
- Place of birth: Southwark, England
- Height: 1.72 m (5 ft 7 1/2 in)
- Position: Defender

Youth career
- AFC Wimbledon

Senior career*
| Years | Team | Apps | (Gls) |
| 2019–2020 | AFC Wimbledon | 0 | (0) |
| 2019 | → Westside (loan) | | |
| 2019–2020 | → South Park (loan) | 12 | (1) |
- * Club domestic league appearances and goals as of 01:00, 2 March 2020 (UTC)

Jamil Tyrique Daniel Awoyejo (born 21 June 2001) is an English professional footballer who last played as a defender for AFC Wimbledon.

== Career ==
On 13 November 2019, after progressing through AFC Wimbledon's academy, Awoyejo made his debut for the club in a 3–1 EFL Trophy loss against Southend United. In December 2019, Awojeyo joined Isthmian League South Central Division club South Park on loan, scoring on his debut on 7 December 2019, in a 4–2 victory against Bracknell Town.

== Career statistics ==
As of 15 December 2019.

Appearances and goals by club, season and competition
| Club | Season | League | | | FA Cup | | League Cup | | Other | | Total | |
| Club | Season | Division | Apps | Goals | Apps | Goals | Apps | Goals | Apps | Goals | Apps | Goals |
|---|---|---|---|---|---|---|---|---|---|---|---|---|
| AFC Wimbledon | 2019–20 | League One | 0 | 0 | 0 | 0 | 0 | 0 | 1 (Note: Appearance(s) in EFL Trophy) | 0 | 1 | 0 |
| Career total | | | 0 | 0 | 0 | 0 | 0 | 0 | 1 | 0 | 1 | 0 |
