= Nesta Guinness-Walker =

English footballer

Personal information
- Full name: Nesta Pierre Guinness-Walker
- Date of birth: 14 September 1999 (age 27)
- Place of birth: Hounslow, England
- Height: 1.80 m (5 ft 11 in)
- Position: Left back

Team information
- Current team: Aberdeen
- Number: 24

Youth career
- 2006–2008: Chelsea
- 2009–2010: Tottenham Hotspur
- 2016–2018: Metropolitan Police

Senior career*
Years	Team	Apps	(Gls)
2018–2019	Metropolitan Police		
2019–2022	AFC Wimbledon	82	(3)
2022–2024	Reading	36	(0)
2024	→ Stevenage (loan)	14	(0)
2024–2026	Northampton Town	66	(3)
2026–	Aberdeen	13	(1)
- * Club domestic league appearances and goals as of 08:46, 22 November 2026 (UTC)

Nesta Pierre Guinness-Walker (born 14 September 1999) is an English professional footballer who plays as a left back for Scottish Premiership club Aberdeen.

== Personal life ==
He is the grandson of actor Matthew Guinness and the great-grandson of actor Sir Alec Guinness. He grew up in Twickenham and is of part-Barbadian descent.

== Career ==
Guinness-Walker played youth football for Chelsea and Tottenham Hotspur, spending two years with Chelsea and one year with Tottenham, before leaving at the age of 11, before playing Sunday League football as a teenager. He joined non-league Metropolitan Police at the age of 17. Following a successful trial period he signed for AFC Wimbledon in May 2019. He scored his first goal for Wimbledon in a 2–1 defeat to Ipswich Town on 20 August 2019. He was offered a new contract by the club at the end of the 2021–22 season, but he left the club on 5 July 2022.

On 29 July 2022, Reading announced the signing of Guinness-Walker on a one-year contract following a successful trial. On 17 May 2023, Reading activated a clause in Guinness-Walker's contract to keep him at the club for the 2023–24 season.

On 24 January 2024, Guinness-Walker joined League One club Stevenage on loan for the remainder of the 2023–24 season.

He was released by Reading at the end of the 2023–24 season.

On 27 September 2024, Guinness-Walker joined League One side Northampton Town on a short-term contract. The contract was extended in December 2024 until summer 2026. He was offered a new contract at the end of the 2025–26 season.

On 8 July 2026, Guinness-Walker joined Scottish Premiership side Aberdeen on a two-year deal.

== Career statistics ==
As of match played 21 November 2026

Appearances and goals by club, season and competition
Club	Season	League			National Cup		League Cup		Other		Total	
Club	Season	Division	Apps	Goals	Apps	Goals	Apps	Goals	Apps	Goals	Apps	Goals
AFC Wimbledon	2019–20	League One	23	1	1	0	1	0	2	0	27	1
AFC Wimbledon	2020–21	League One	31	1	1	0	1	0	2	0	35	1
AFC Wimbledon	2021–22	League One	28	1	3	0	2	0	2	0	35	1
AFC Wimbledon	Total		82	3	5	0	4	0	6	0	97	3
Reading	2022–23	Championship	28	0	1	0	1	0	0	0	30	0
Reading	2023–24	League One	8	0	0	0	1	0	2	0	11	0
Reading	Total		36	0	1	0	2	0	2	0	41	0
Stevenage (loan)	2023–24	League One	14	0	0	0	0	0	0	0	14	0
Northampton Town	2024–25	League One	27	1	1	0	0	0	1	0	29	1
Northampton Town	2025–26	League One	39	2	1	0	0	0	3	0	43	2
Northampton Town	Total		66	3	2	0	0	0	4	0	72	3
Aberdeen	2026–27	Scottish Premiership	13	1	0	0	7	0	0	0	20	1
Career total			211	7	8	0	13	0	11	0	243	7
