= 2017–18 Burnley F.C. season =

English football club season

Burnley
2017–18 season
- Chairman: Mike Garlick
- Manager: Sean Dyche
- Stadium: Turf Moor
- Premier League: 7th
- FA Cup: Third round
- EFL Cup: Third round
- Top goalscorer: League: Chris Wood (10); All: Chris Wood (11)
- Highest home attendance: 21,841 (v Manchester United, Premier League, 20 January 2018)
- Lowest home attendance: 11,799 (v Leeds United, EFL Cup, 19 September 2017)
- Average home league attendance: 20,688
Home colours	Away colours	Third colours

The 2017–18 season was Burnley's 136th competitive season, their second consecutive in the Premier League and their 55th in top flight English football. Along with the Premier League, the club also competed in the FA Cup and EFL Cup.

The season covered the period from 1 July 2017 to 30 June 2018.

== Match details ==
=== Premier League ===
==== League table ====
Pos	Team	Pld	W	D	L	GF	GA	GD	Pts	Qualification or relegation
5	Chelsea	38	21	7	10	62	38	+24	70	Qualification for the Europa League group stage (Note: Since the winners of the 2017–18 FA Cup (Chelsea) and the winners of the 2017–18 EFL Cup (Manchester City) both qualified for European competition based on their league positions, the berths awarded to the 5th-placed team (Europa League group stage) and the League Cup winners (Europa League second qualifying round) were passed down the league.)
6	Arsenal	38	19	6	13	74	51	+23	63	Qualification for the Europa League group stage
7	Burnley	38	14	12	12	36	39	−3	54	Qualification for the Europa League second qualifying round
8	Everton	38	13	10	15	44	58	−14	49	
9	Leicester City	38	12	11	15	56	60	−4	47	

Source: Premier League
Rules for classification: 1) Points; 2) Goal difference; 3) Goals scored. 4) Play-offs (only if needed to decide champion, teams for relegation or teams for UEFA competitions).

==== Results summary ====
Overall								Home						Away					
Pld	W	D	L	GF	GA	GD	Pts	W	D	L	GF	GA	GD	W	D	L	GF	GA	GD
38	14	12	12	36	39	−3	54	7	5	7	16	17	−1	7	7	5	20	22	−2

Last updated: 6 May 2018.
Source: Premier League

==== Matches ====
Premier League match details
Date	League position	Opponents	Venue	Result	Score F–A	Scorers	Attendance	Ref
12 August 2017	6th	Chelsea	A	W	3–2	Vokes (2) 24', 43', Ward 39'	41,616	
19 August 2017	13th	West Bromwich Albion	H	L	0–1		19,619	
27 August 2017	10th	Tottenham Hotspur	A	D	1–1	Wood 90+2'	67,862	
10 September 2017	7th	Crystal Palace	H	W	1–0	Wood 3'	18,862	
16 September 2017	7th	Liverpool	A	D	1–1	Arfield 27'	53,231	
23 September 2017	9th	Huddersfield Town	H	D	0–0		20,759	
1 October 2017	6th	Everton	A	W	1–0	Hendrick 21'	38,448	
14 October 2017	7th	West Ham United	H	D	1–1	Wood 85'	20,945	
21 October 2017	9th	Manchester City	A	L	0–3		54,118	
30 October 2017	7th	Newcastle United	H	W	1–0	Hendrick 74'	21,031	
4 November 2017	6th	Southampton	A	W	1–0	Vokes 81'	30,491	
18 November 2017	7th	Swansea City	H	W	2–0	Cork 29', Barnes 40'	18,895	
26 November 2017	7th	Arsenal	H	L	0–1		21,722	
29 November 2017	6th	AFC Bournemouth	A	W	2–1	Wood 37', Brady 65'	10,302	
2 December 2017	7th	Leicester City	A	L	0–1		30,714	
9 December 2017	7th	Watford	H	W	1–0	Arfield 45'	19,479	
12 December 2017	6th	Stoke City	H	W	1–0	Barnes 89'	19,909	
16 December 2017	5th	Brighton & Hove Albion	A	D	0–0		29,921	
23 December 2017	7th	Tottenham Hotspur	H	L	0–3		21,650	
26 December 2017	7th	Manchester United	A	D	2–2	Barnes 3', Defour 36'	75,046	
30 December 2017	7th	Huddersfield Town	A	D	0–0		24,095	
1 January 2018	7th	Liverpool	H	L	1–2	Guðmundsson 87'	21,756	
13 January 2018	7th	Crystal Palace	A	L	0–1		24,696	
20 January 2018	8th	Manchester United	H	L	0–1		21,841	
31 January 2018	7th	Newcastle United	A	D	1–1	Darlow 85' o.g.	50,174	
3 February 2018	7th	Manchester City	H	D	1–1	Guðmundsson 82'	21,658	
10 February 2018	7th	Swansea City	A	L	0–1		20,179	
24 February 2018	7th	Southampton	H	D	1–1	Barnes 67'	20,982	
3 March 2018	7th	Everton	H	W	2–1	Barnes 56', Wood 80'	20,802	
10 March 2018	7th	West Ham United	A	W	3–0	Barnes 66', Wood (2) 70', 81'	56,904	
31 March 2018	7th	West Bromwich Albion	A	W	2–1	Barnes 22', Wood 73'	23,455	
7 April 2018	7th	Watford	A	W	2–1	Vokes 70', Cork 73'	20,044	
14 April 2018	7th	Leicester City	H	W	2–1	Wood 6', Long 9'	21,727	
19 April 2018	7th	Chelsea	H	L	1–2	Barnes 64'	21,264	
22 April 2018	7th	Stoke City	A	D	1–1	Barnes 62'	29,532	
28 April 2018	7th	Brighton & Hove Albion	H	D	0–0		19,459	
6 May 2018	7th	Arsenal	A	L	0–5		59,540	
13 May 2018	7th	AFC Bournemouth	H	L	1–2	Wood 39'	20,720	

=== FA Cup ===
FA Cup match details
Round	Date	Opponents	Venue	Result	Score F–A	Scorers	Attendance	Ref
Third round	6 January 2018	Manchester City	A	L	1–4	Barnes 25'	53,356	

=== EFL Cup ===
EFL Cup match details
Round	Date	Opponents	Venue	Result	Score F–A	Scorers	Attendance	Ref
Second round	23 August 2017	Blackburn Rovers	A	W	2–0	Cork 27', Brady 45+4'	16,313	
Third round	19 September 2017	Leeds United	H	D	2–2 (a.e.t.); 3–5 pens.	Wood 89' pen., Brady 90+6'	11,799	

== Transfers ==
=== In ===
Date	Player	Club†	Fee	Ref
5 July 2017	Rahis Nabi	(West Bromwich Albion)	Free	
5 July 2017	Christian N'Guessan	(Blackpool)	Free	
5 July 2017	Aidan Stone	Brocton	Free	
6 July 2017	Charlie Taylor	Leeds United	Undisclosed	
7 July 2017	Jonathan Walters	Stoke City	Undisclosed (Note: Fee reported as £3,000,000)	
11 July 2017	Jack Cork	Swansea City	Undisclosed (Note: Fee reported as £10,000,000)	
25 July 2017	Phil Bardsley	Stoke City	Undisclosed (Note: Fee reported as £750,000, rising to £1,500,000)	
8 August 2017	Adam Legzdins	Birmingham City	Undisclosed	
21 August 2017	Chris Wood	Leeds United	Undisclosed (Note: Fee reported as £15,000,000)	
31 August 2017	Nahki Wells	Huddersfield Town	Undisclosed	
21 September 2017	Anders Lindegaard	(Preston North End)	Free	
23 January 2018	Aaron Lennon	Everton	Undisclosed	

† Brackets around club names denote the player's contract with that club had expired before he joined Burnley.

=== Loans in ===
Date	Player	Club	Return	Ref
8 January 2018	Georges-Kévin Nkoudou	Tottenham Hotspur	End of season	

=== Out ===
Date	Player	Club†	Fee	Ref
30 June 2017	Joey Barton		Retired	
30 June 2017	George Green	(Viking)	Released	
30 June 2017	Christian Hill		Released	
30 June 2017	Taofiq Olomowewe	(Maldon & Tiptree)	Released	
30 June 2017	Richard Pingling	(AFC Wimbledon)	Released	
30 June 2017	Tony Aghayere	(Salford City)	Released	
30 June 2017	Paul Robinson		Retired	
30 June 2017	Michael Kightly	(Southend United)	Released	
30 June 2017	George Boyd	(Sheffield Wednesday)	Released	
3 July 2017	Michael Keane	Everton	Undisclosed (Note: Fee reported as £25,000,000, which could rise to £30,000,000)	
7 July 2017	Rouwen Hennings	Fortuna Düsseldorf	Free	
26 July 2017	Tendayi Darikwa	Nottingham Forest	Undisclosed	
9 August 2017	Andre Gray	Watford	Undisclosed (Note: Fee reported as £18,500,000)	
31 August 2017	Robbie Leitch	(St Mirren)	Released	
9 January 2018	Luke Hendrie	Shrewsbury Town	Undisclosed	
18 January 2018	Alex Whitmore	Chesterfield	Free	
19 January 2018	Harry Flowers	Guiseley	Free	
2 February 2018	Fredrik Ulvestad	Djurgårdens IF	Free	

† Brackets around club names denote the player joined that club after his Burnley contract expired.

=== Loans out ===
Date	Player	Club	Return	Ref
1 July 2017	Josh Ginnelly	Lincoln City	12 January 2018	
4 July 2017	Ntumba Massanka	Wrexham	1 January 2018	
5 July 2017	Jimmy Dunne	Barrow	1 January 2018	
5 July 2017	Brad Jackson	Southport	End of season	
10 July 2017	Connor King	Barnoldswick Town		
28 July 2017	Chris Long	Northampton Town	End of season	
28 July 2017	Alex Whitmore	Bury	4 January 2018	
31 July 2017	Aiden O'Neill	Fleetwood Town	12 January 2018	
31 July 2017	Conor Mitchell	Chester	1 January 2018	
21 August 2017	Luke Hendrie	Bradford City	6 January 2018	
31 August 2017	Dan Agyei	Walsall	6 January 2018	
31 August 2017	Tommy Wood	Barnoldswick Town		
31 August 2017	Tom Anderson	Port Vale	31 January 2018	
4 January 2018	Jimmy Dunne	Accrington Stanley	End of season	
4 January 2018	Khius Metz	Chorley	End of season	
12 January 2018	Harry Limb	Matlock Town	End of season	
12 January 2018	Josh Ginnelly	Tranmere Rovers	End of season	
18 January 2018	Dan Agyei	Blackpool	End of season	
31 January 2018	Tom Anderson	Doncaster Rovers	End of season	

== Appearances and goals ==
Numbers in parentheses denote appearances as substitute.
Players with names struck through and marked † left the club during the playing season.
Players with names in italics and marked * were on loan from another club for the whole of their season with Burnley.
Players listed with no appearances have been in the matchday squad but only as unused substitutes.
Key to positions: GK – Goalkeeper; DF – Defender; MF – Midfielder; FW – Forward

Players contracted for the 2017–18 season
No.	Pos.	Nat.	Name	League		FA Cup		EFL Cup		Total		Discipline	
No.	Pos.	Nat.	Name	Apps	Goals	Apps	Goals	Apps	Goals	Apps	Goals	A yellow rectangle, denoting the yellow penalty card shown to a player being cautioned	A red rectangle, denoting the red penalty card shown to a player being sent off
1	GK	ENG	Tom Heaton	4	0	0	0	0	0	4	0	0	0
2	DF	ENG	Matthew Lowton	25 (1)	0	1	0	0	0	26 (1)	0	1	0
3	DF	ENG	Charlie Taylor	10 (1)	0	1	0	2	0	13 (1)	0	3	0
4	MF	ENG	Jack Cork	38	2	1	0	1 (1)	1	40 (1)	3	8	0
5	DF	ENG	James Tarkowski	31	0	0	0	2	0	33	0	5	0
6	DF	ENG	Ben Mee	29	0	1	0	0	0	30	0	5	0
7	FW	FRA	Georges-Kévin Nkoudou *	2 (6)	0	0	0	0	0	2 (6)	0	1	0
8	MF	ENG	Dean Marney	0	0	0	0	0	0	0	0	0	0
9	FW	WAL	Sam Vokes	7 (23)	4	1	0	1	0	9 (23)	4	3	0
10	FW	ENG	Ashley Barnes	21 (15)	9	1	1	2	0	24 (15)	10	10	0
11	FW	NZL	Chris Wood	20 (4)	10	0	0	0 (2)	1	20 (6)	11	1	0
12	MF	IRL	Robbie Brady	15	1	0	0	1 (1)	2	16 (1)	3	3	0
13	MF	IRL	Jeff Hendrick	29 (5)	2	1	0	1	0	31 (5)	2	1	0
16	MF	BEL	Steven Defour	24	1	0	0	0 (1)	0	24 (1)	1	6	0
17	MF	ISL	Jóhann Berg Guðmundsson	32 (3)	2	1	0	1 (1)	0	34 (4)	2	3	0
18	MF	ENG	Ashley Westwood	12 (7)	0	1	0	2	0	15 (7)	0	3	0
19	FW	IRL	Jonathan Walters	0 (3)	0	0 (1)	0	1	0	1 (4)	0	0	0
20	MF	NOR	~~Fredrik Ulvestad~~ †	0	0	0	0	0	0	0	0	0	0
21	FW	BER	Nahki Wells	0 (9)	0	0 (1)	0	0	0	0 (10)	0	0	0
22	GK	DEN	Anders Lindegaard	0	0	0	0	0	0	0	0	0	0
23	DF	IRL	Stephen Ward	28	1	0	0	0	0	28	1	1	0
24	FW	ENG	Chris Long	0	0	0	0	0	0	0	0	0	0
25	MF	ENG	Aaron Lennon	13 (1)	0	0	0	0	0	13 (1)	0	2	0
26	DF	SCO	Phil Bardsley	13	0	0	0	2	0	15	0	7	0
28	DF	IRL	Kevin Long	16	1	1	0	2	0	19	1	3	0
29	GK	ENG	Nick Pope	34 (1)	0	1	0	2	0	37 (1)	0	3	0
30	GK	ENG	Adam Legzdins	0	0	0	0	0	0	0	0	0	0
31	MF	ENG	Dwight McNeil	0 (1)	0	0	0	0	0	0 (1)	0	0	0
32	FW	ENG	Dan Agyei	0	0	0	0	0	0	0	0	0	0
34	DF	ENG	Tom Anderson	0	0	0	0	0	0	0	0	0	0
37	MF	CAN	Scott Arfield	15 (3)	2	0	0	2	0	17 (3)	2	3	0
41	MF	AUS	Aiden O'Neill	0	0	0	0	0	0	0	0	0	0

== See also ==
- List of Burnley F.C. seasons
