= Tommy Wood (footballer) =

English footballer

Personal information
- Full name: Tommy Paul Wood
- Date of birth: 26 November 1998 (age 27)
- Place of birth: Hillingdon, England
- Height: 1.88 m (6 ft 2 in)
- Position: Forward

Team information
- Current team: Cheshunt

Youth career
- Yeading Wanderers
- 2009–2012: Wycombe Wanderers
- 2012–2015: Reading
- 2015–2018: Burnley

Senior career*
Years	Team	Apps	(Gls)
2017–2018	Burnley	0	(0)
2018–2020	AFC Wimbledon	3	(0)
2019	→ Slough Town (loan)	4	(0)
2019	→ Burgess Hill Town (loan)	5	(5)
2019	→ Leatherhead (loan)	6	(6)
2020	→ Tonbridge Angels (loan)	3	(3)
2020–2022	Tonbridge Angels	45	(15)
2022–2023	Hampton & Richmond Borough	28	(8)
2023	Tonbridge Angels	12	(0)
2023–2024	Lewes	30	(11)
2024–2025	Cheshunt	28	(9)
2024–2025	Hornchurch	20	(2)
2025–2026	Enfield Town	12	(1)
2026–	Cheshunt	27	(7)
- * Club domestic league appearances and goals as of 20:08, 19 September 2026 (UTC)

Tommy Paul Wood (born 26 November 1998) is an English footballer who plays as a forward for Cheshunt.

== Career ==
After spells in the academy teams at Wycombe Wanderers and Reading, Wood signed a two-year scholarship with Burnley in 2015. After winning the player of the season award for the Clarets youth team in 2016–17, his scholarship was extended for another year, and he experienced senior football for the first time with loan spells at Barnoldswick Town and Ossett Albion. He was released at the end of the season.

Wood joined AFC Wimbledon in May 2018. He made his league debut as an 84th-minute substitute in the 0–3 loss to Fleetwood Town on 22 January 2019.

In February 2019, he joined Slough Town on a one-month loan deal.

On 14 March 2019, he joined Burgess Hill Town on loan until the end of the season. Two days later, he scored the winning goal on his debut, a 3–2 away win against Kingstonian.

On 6 September 2019, he joined Leatherhead on an initial 28 day loan deal. After returning to Wimbledon from his loan period he scored his first goal for the club in an EFL Trophy tie against Southend United on 13 November 2019. In June 2020, Wood was among the group of players whose contracts were not renewed by AFC Wimbledon.

Wood joined Tonbridge on a permanent deal on 13 October 2020.

On 25 May 2022, after two campaigns at Tonbridge, Wood agreed to join Hampton & Richmond Borough ahead of the 2022–23 season.

On 9 August 2023 he joined Lewes ahead of the 2023–24 season.

== Career statistics ==
As of match played 20 August 2022.

Appearances and goals by club, season and competition
Club	Season	League			FA Cup		League Cup		Other		Total	
Club	Season	Division	Apps	Goals	Apps	Goals	Apps	Goals	Apps	Goals	Apps	Goals
Burnley	2017–18	Premier League	0	0	0	0	0	0	0	0	0	0
Barnoldswick Town (loan)	2017–18	NWCL Premier Division	7	0	0	0	0	0	0	0	7	0
Ossett Albion (loan)	2017–18	NPL Division One North	No data currently available									
AFC Wimbledon	2018–19	League One	1	0	0	0	0	0	1 (Note: Appearance(s) in EFL Trophy)	0	2	0
AFC Wimbledon	2019–20	League One	2	0	0	0	0	0	2	1	4	1
AFC Wimbledon	Total		3	0	0	0	0	0	3	1	6	1
Slough Town (loan)	2018–19	National League South	4	0	0	0	—		0	0	4	0
Burgess Hill Town (loan)	2018–19	Isthmian League Premier Division	5	5	0	0	—		0	0	5	5
Leatherhead (loan)	2019–20	Isthmian League Premier Division	8	6	2	1	—		2 (Note: Appearance(s) in FA Trophy)	2	12	9
Tonbridge Angels (loan)	2019–20	National League South	3	3	0	0	—		0	0	3	3
Tonbridge Angels	2020–21	National League South	12	3	3	0	—		1	0	16	3
Tonbridge Angels	2021–22	National League South	33	12	1	0	—		4	1	38	13
Tonbridge Angels	Total		45	15	4	0	—		5	1	54	16
Hampton & Richmond Borough	2022–23	National League South	4	2	0	0	—		0	0	4	2
Career total			79	31	6	1	0	0	10	4	95	36
