= Finlay Macnab =

English footballer

Personal information
- Full name: Finlay Alexander Macnab
- Date of birth: 27 December 2000 (age 25)
- Place of birth: England
- Position: Midfielder

Team information
- Current team: Hanworth Villa

Youth career
- Brentford
- –2019: AFC Wimbledon

Senior career*
Years	Team	Apps	(Gls)
2019–2020	AFC Wimbledon	0	(0)
2019	→ Leatherhead (loan)	6	(0)
2019	→ Leatherhead (loan)	10	(0)
2022	Welwyn Garden City	0	(0)
2022–2023	Kings Langley	10	(0)
2023	Hanworth Villa	14	(5)
2023–2024	Hendon	19	(3)
2024–	Hanworth Villa	0	(0)
- * Club domestic league appearances and goals as of 12:44, 6 June 2024 (UTC)

Finlay Alexander Macnab (born 27 December 2000) is an English professional footballer who plays as a midfielder for Hanworth Villa.

His parents are Geoffrey Charles Macnab and Catriona Campbell. His paternal grandfather was James Charles Macnab of Macnab, 23rd Chief of Clan Macnab.

== Career ==
Macnab began his career in the youth system at Brentford, before signing his first professional contract with AFC Wimbledon after impressing during a trial period at the club. That same day he joined Leatherhead on loan. On 13 November 2019, Macnab made his debut for the club in a 3–1 EFL Trophy loss against Southend United. He was released at the end of the season following the expiration of his contract. In October 2021, he spoke to BBC News about how he had been kept out of the game for more than a year because of suffering from long covid.

In August 2022, Macnab returned to football, joining Southern League Division One Central side Welwyn Garden City.

In September 2023, Macnab joined Hendon. Following the conclusion of the 2023–24 season, he returned to Hanworth Villa.

== Career statistics ==
As of 17 December 2019.

Appearances and goals by club, season and competition
Club	Season	League			FA Cup		League Cup		Other		Total	
Club	Season	Division	Apps	Goals	Apps	Goals	Apps	Goals	Apps	Goals	Apps	Goals
AFC Wimbledon	2019–20	League One	0	0	0	0	0	0	1 (Note: Appearance(s) in EFL Trophy)	0	1	0
Career total			0	0	0	0	0	0	1	0	1	0
