= Adam Roscrow =

Welsh footballer

Personal information
- Full name: Adam Roscrow
- Date of birth: 17 February 1995 (age 31)
- Height: 5 ft 10 in (1.78 m)
- Position: Striker

Team information
- Current team: Llantwit Major
- Number: 10

Youth career
- Swansea City
- Llantwit Major

Senior career*
Years	Team	Apps	(Gls)
- Neath
2012–2013	Llantwit Major	22	(8)
2013–2014	Pontardawe Town	14	(2)
2014–2019	Cardiff Metropolitan University		
2019–2021	AFC Wimbledon	17	(0)
2021–2024	The New Saints	13	(3)
2021–2022	→ Cardiff Metropolitan University (loan)	26	(5)
2022–2023	→ Bala Town (loan)	12	(7)
2023–2024	→ Welling United (loan)	12	(1)
2024–2026	Cardiff Metropolitan University	54	(10)
2026–	Llantwit Major	10	(4)

International career
2018–2019	Wales C	2	(1)
- * Club domestic league appearances and goals as of 09:11, 8 November 2026 (UTC)

Adam Roscrow (born 17 February 1995) is a Welsh professional footballer who plays as a striker for Llantwit Major.

== Club career ==
Roscrow played youth football for Swansea City, before joining Llantwit Major. Roscrow subsequently played for Neath, Llantwit Major and Pontardawe Town, before signing for Cardiff Metropolitan University in 2014. At Cardiff Met, Roscrow scored 34 Welsh Premier League goals in 79 appearances. In June 2019, Roscrow moved to England, signing for AFC Wimbledon, where he turned professional. He scored his first goal for Wimbledon in an EFL Trophy tie against Charlton Athletic on 1 September 2020.

In January 2021, Roscrow joined The New Saints on a three-and-a-half-year deal for an undisclosed, club record fee.

In June 2021, Roscrow returned to Cardiff Metropolitan University on a season-long loan. In September 2022 he moved on loan to Bala Town. He moved on loan to Welling United in September 2023. He was released by TNS at the end of the 2023–24 season.

He returned to Cardiff Metropolitan University in June 2024.

In July 2026 he rejoined Llantwit Major.

== International career ==
On 20 March 2018, Roscrow made his Wales C debut against England C at Barry Town United's Jenner Park Stadium in a 3–2 defeat for the Welsh team. In the return fixture at Moor Lane, Salford, Roscrow scored Wales' second equaliser in a 2–2 draw.
