= 2018–19 AFC Wimbledon season =

AFC Wimbledon
2018–19 season
- Chairman: Erik Samuelson
- Manager: Neal Ardley (until 12 November); Wally Downes (from 4 December)
- Stadium: Kingsmeadow
- League One: 20th
- FA Cup: Fifth round v Millwall (16 February 2019)
- EFL Cup: Second round v West Ham (28 August 2018)
- EFL Trophy: Round 2 v Celsea U21 (4 December 2018)
- Top goalscorer: League: Joe Pigott (10); All: Joe Pigott (13)
- Highest home attendance: 4,848 vs Sunderland (25 August 2018)
- Lowest home attendance: 3,737 vs Peterborough United (12 March 2019)
- Average home league attendance: 4,140
- Biggest win: 4–0 (6 Nov 2018 v. Stevenage, EFL Trophy)
- Biggest defeat: 0–3 (1 September 2018 v. Burton Albion, League One)
Home colours	Away colours	Third colours

The 2018–19 season was the third in League One, the third tier of the English football league system, for AFC Wimbledon since their promotion in 2016 from League Two. Along with competing in League One, the Kingston upon Thames-based club participated in three cup competitions, the FA Cup, EFL Cup and EFL Trophy.

== Matches ==
=== Pre-season friendlies ===
The Dons revealed they will play Reading, Woking, Queens Park Rangers, Brighton & Hove Albion, Havant & Waterlooville and Boreham Wood.

7 July 2018 Friendly	AFC Wimbledon	4–2	Reading	Kingston upon Thames
12:00 BST	Appiah 36'; Pigott 42'; Kaja 74'; Crichlow 84'	Report	Popa 51'; Smith 56'	Stadium: Kingsmeadow

10 July 2018 Friendly	Woking	1–3	AFC Wimbledon	Woking
19:45 BST	Hodges 79'	Report	Oshilaja 4'; Pinnock 15'; Meades 43'	Stadium: The Laithwaite Community Stadium; Attendance: 661

14 July 2018 Friendly	AFC Wimbledon	0–1	Queens Park Rangers	Kingston upon Thames
15:00 BST		Report	Freeman 90'	Stadium: Kingsmeadow

21 July 2018 Friendly	AFC Wimbledon	2–1	Brighton & Hove Albion	Kingston upon Thames
15:00 BST	Pigott 15'; Appiah 31'	Report	Norwood 65'	Stadium: Kingsmeadow

27 July 2018 Friendly	Havant & Waterlooville	4–1	AFC Wimbledon	Havant
19:45 BST	Kabamba 36'; Rutherford 68', 84'; Lewis 73'	Report	Egan 55'	Stadium: Westleigh Park

28 July 2018 Friendly	Boreham Wood	0–0	AFC Wimbledon	Borehamwood
15:00 BST		Report		Stadium: Meadow Park

=== League One ===
==== League table ====
Pos	Team	Pld	W	D	L	GF	GA	GD	Pts	Promotion, qualification or relegation
18	Shrewsbury Town	46	12	16	18	51	59	−8	52	
19	Southend United	46	14	8	24	55	68	−13	50	
20	AFC Wimbledon	46	13	11	22	42	63	−21	50	
21	Plymouth Argyle (R)	46	13	11	22	56	80	−24	50	Relegation to EFL League Two
22	Walsall (R)	46	12	11	23	49	71	−22	47	Relegation to EFL League Two

Source: EFL Official Website
Rules for classification: 1) Points; 2) Goal difference; 3) Number of goals scored; 4) Head-to-head results
(R) Relegated

==== Results summary ====
Overall								Home						Away					
Pld	W	D	L	GF	GA	GD	Pts	W	D	L	GF	GA	GD	W	D	L	GF	GA	GD
46	13	11	22	42	63	−21	50	6	5	12	24	37	−13	7	6	10	18	26	−8

Last updated: 28 April 2019.
Source: BBC

==== Results by matchday ====
Matchday	1	2	3	4	5	6	7	8	9	10	11	12	13	14	15	16	17	18	19	20	21	22	23	24	25	26	27	28	29	30	31	32	33	34	35	36	37	38	39	40	41	42	43	44	45	46
Ground	A	H	A	H	H	A	A	H	A	H	H	A	H	A	A	H	H	A	H	A	H	A	A	H	H	A	A	H	A	A	H	A	A	H	A	H	H	A	H	A	H	A	H	A	H	A
Result	W	D	D	L	L	L	W	L	L	W	L	L	L	L	L	L	L	L	W	L	D	L	W	W	D	L	D	L	L	L	L	W	W	L	D	W	W	W	L	W	D	D	D	D	W	D
Position	9	9	7	12	15	20	12	16	19	16	17	20	20	21	22	23	23	23	23	23	23	24	24	22	23	24	24	24	24	24	24	24	24	24	24	24	24	22	23	22	21	21	21	21	19	20

Updated to match(es) played on 23 April 2019. Source: Statto.com
A = Away; H = Home; W = Win; D = Draw; L = Loss

==== Matches ====
On 21 June 2018, the League One fixtures for the forthcoming season were announced.

===== August =====
4 August 2018 1	Fleetwood Town	0–1	AFC Wimbledon	Highbury Stadium
15:00 BST	Sowerby (yellow card) 56'	Report	Appiah (yellow card) 56'; Pigott 60'; Trotter (yellow card) 72'	Attendance: 3,236; Referee: Mark Heywood

11 August 2018 2	AFC Wimbledon	0–0	Coventry City	Kingston upon Thames
15:00 BST	Trotter (yellow card) 33'	Report	Ogogo (yellow card) 66'	Stadium: Kingsmeadow; Attendance: 4,768; Referee: Lee Swabey

18 August 2018 3	Barnsley	0–0	AFC Wimbledon	Oakwell
15:00 BST		Report		Attendance: 11607; Referee: Martin Coy

21 August 2018 4	AFC Wimbledon	1–3	Walsall	Kingston upon Thames
19:45 BST	Wordsworth (yellow card) 3'; Appiah 87'	Report	Morris 16'; Nightingale 70' (o.g.); Cook 79'; Cook (yellow card) 80'	Stadium: Kingsmeadow; Attendance: 3887; Referee: Tom Nield

25 August 2018 5	AFC Wimbledon	1–2	Sunderland	Kingston upon Thames
15:00 BST	Pigott 9'	Report	Cattermole 66', 83'	Stadium: Kingsmeadow; Attendance: 4,848; Referee: John Busby

===== September =====
1 September 2018 6	Burton Albion	3–0	AFC Wimbledon	Burton upon Trent
15:00 BST	Quinn 34'; Templeton 54'; Boyce 60'	Report		Stadium: Pirelli Stadium; Attendance: 2,814; Referee: Anthony Backhouse

8 September 2018 7	Gillingham	0–1	AFC Wimbledon	Gillingham
15:00 BST		Report	Pigott 53'	Stadium: Priestfield Stadium; Attendance: 5,246; Referee: Nick Kinseley

15 September 2018 8	AFC Wimbledon	2–3	Scunthorpe United	Kingston upon Thames
15:00 BST	Trotter 49'; Appiah 55'	Report	Morris 8', 32'; Ugbo 52'	Stadium: Kingsmeadow; Attendance: 3,885; Referee: Charles Breakspear

22 September 2018 9	Accrington Stanley	2–1	AFC Wimbledon	Accrington
15:00 BST	Kee 6'; McConville 60'	Report	Wagstaff 64'; Watson (yellow card) 69'; Soares (yellow card) 72'	Stadium: Crown Ground; Attendance: 1,732; Referee: Ross Joyce

29 September 2018 10	AFC Wimbledon	2–1	Oxford United	Kingston upon Thames
15:00 BST	Wagstaff 20'; Pigott 32'	Report	Brannagan 44'	Stadium: Kingsmeadow; Attendance: 4,068; Referee: Robert Lewis

===== October =====
2 October 2018 11	AFC Wimbledon	0–1	Bradford City	Kingston upon Thames
19:45 BST		Report	Payne 45+1' (pen.)	Stadium: Kingsmeadow; Attendance: 3,630; Referee: Alan Young

6 October 2018 12	Plymouth Argyle	1–0	AFC Wimbledon	Plymouth
15:00 BST	Smith-Brown (yellow card) 61'; Ladapo 75'	Report	Wagstaff (yellow card) 80'; Purrington (yellow card) 90'	Stadium: Home Park; Attendance: 8,542; Referee: Alan Young

13 October 2018 13	AFC Wimbledon	1–2	Portsmouth	Kingston upon Thames
15:00 BST	Soares (yellow card) 49'; Hanson 63'	Report	Naylor 24'; Evans 31'; Donohue (yellow card) 38'; Whatmough (yellow card) 40'	Stadium: Kingsmeadow; Attendance: 4,569; Referee: Lee Probert

20 October 2018 14	Blackpool	2–0	AFC Wimbledon	Blackpool
15:00 BST	Tilt 7'; Bola 84'	Report	Hanson (yellow card) 21'; Appiah (yellow card) 73'	Stadium: Bloomfield Road; Attendance: 3,246; Referee: Anthony Backhouse

23 October 2018 15	Bristol Rovers	2–0	AFC Wimbledon	Horfield
19:45 BST	Upson 35'; Nightingale 53' (o.g.)	Report		Stadium: Memorial Stadium; Attendance: 7,184; Referee: Andy Woolmer

27 October 2018 16	AFC Wimbledon	0–2	Luton Town	Kingston upon Thames
15:00 BST		Report	Mpanzu 61'; Lee 80'	Stadium: Kingsmeadow; Attendance: 4,202; Referee: Andy Davies

===== November =====
3 November 2018 17	AFC Wimbledon	1–2	Shrewsbury Town	Kingston upon Thames
15:00 GMT	Hanson 35'	Report	Waterfall 57', 89'	Stadium: Kingsmeadow; Attendance: 4,066; Referee: Lee Collins

17 November 2018 18	Doncaster Rovers	2–1	AFC Wimbledon	Doncaster
15:00 GMT	Crawford 35'; Rowe 86'	Report	Pinnock 26'; Trotter (yellow card) 36'; Wordsworth (yellow card) 75'; Barcham (yellow card) 90+1'	Stadium: Keepmoat Stadium; Attendance: 7,843; Referee: Antony Coggins

24 November 2018 19	AFC Wimbledon	2–1	Southend United	Kingston upon Thames
15:00 GMT	Hendrie 45+1' (o.g.); Pinnock 70'	Report	Trotter 11' (o.g.)	Stadium: Kingsmeadow; Attendance: 4,195; Referee: Steve Martin

27 November 2018 20	Peterborough United	1–0	AFC Wimbledon	Peterborough
19:45 GMT	Maddison 60'	Report		Stadium: London Road Stadium; Attendance: 5,064; Referee: Christopher Sarginson

===== December =====
8 December 2018 21	AFC Wimbledon	1–1	Rochdale	London
15:00 GMT	Barcham 70'; Purrington (yellow card) 81'	Report	Andrew 35'; M.J. Willams (yellow card) 90+2'	Stadium: Kingsmeadow; Attendance: 3,988; Referee: Kevin Johnson

15 December 2018 22	Charlton Athletic	2–0	AFC Wimbledon	Charlton
15:00 GMT	Sarr (red card) 1'; Bielik (yellow card) 45+2'; Taylor 60', (yellow card) 64'; Marshall 86'	Report	Pinnock (yellow card) 20' (yellow-red card) 33'; Wagstaff (yellow card) 71'	Stadium: The Valley; Attendance: 10,691; Referee: Trevor Kettle

22 December 2018 23	Wycombe Wanderers	1–2	AFC Wimbledon	High Wycombe
15:00 GMT	Onyedinma 90+2'	Report	Appiah 29'; Hanson (yellow card) 53'; Jervis 90'	Stadium: Adams Park; Attendance: 5,814; Referee: John Busby

26 December 2018 24	AFC Wimbledon	2–1	Plymouth Argyle	Kingston upon Thames
15:00 GMT	Wordsworth 32'; Pinnock 75'	Report	Fox 23'; Sarcevic (yellow card) 26'; Smith-Brown (yellow card) 59'	Stadium: Kingsmeadow; Attendance: 4,434; Referee: Craig Hicks

29 December 2018 25	AFC Wimbledon	0–0	Blackpool	Kingston upon Thames
15:00 GMT	Appiah (yellow card) 64'; Wordsworth (yellow card) 86'	Report	Bola (yellow card) 61'	Stadium: Kingsmeadow; Attendance: 4,416; Referee: Dean Whitestone

===== January =====
1 January 2019 26	Portsmouth	2–1	AFC Wimbledon	Portsmouth
15:00 GMT	Lowe 8'; Curtis (yellow card) 80' (goal) 80'	Report	Wordsworth (yellow card) 55'; Appiah 75'	Stadium: Fratton Park; Attendance: 18,732; Referee: Antony Coggins

12 January 2019 27	Coventry City	1–1	AFC Wimbledon	Coventry
15:00 GMT	Thomas 61'	Report	Jervis 2'	Stadium: Ricoh Arena; Attendance: 10,420; Referee: Rob Lewis

19 January 2019 28	AFC Wimbledon	1–4	Barnsley	Kingston upon Thames
15:00 GMT	Pigott 36'; Seddon (yellow card) 59'; Pinnock (yellow card) 81'	Report	Woodrow 19'; Pinnock (yellow card) 35'; Moore 51'; B Williams (yellow card) 54'; Thiam 65'; McGeehan 90'	Stadium: Kingsmeadow; Attendance: 4,795; Referee: Neil Hair

22 January 2019 29	AFC Wimbledon	0–3	Fleetwood Town	Kingston upon Thames
19:45 GMT	Pinnock (yellow card) 63'	Report	Evans 19', 30' (yellow card) 89'; Hunter 83'	Stadium: Kingsmeadow; Attendance: 3,499; Referee: Charles Breakspear
Note: Match originally scheduled for 5 January.

===== February =====
2 February 2019 30	Sunderland	1–0	AFC Wimbledon	Sunderland
15:00 GMT	McGeady 67'; Leadbitter (yellow card) 76'	Report	Oshilaja (yellow card) 36'; Seddon (yellow card) 68'; Wordsworth (yellow card) 69'	Stadium: Stadium of Light; Attendance: 30,424; Referee: Ben Toner

9 February 2019 31	AFC Wimbledon	0–2	Burton Albion	Kingston upon Thames
15:00 GMT		Report	Allen 14'; Templeton 57'	Stadium: Kingsmeadow; Attendance: 4,003; Referee: Andy Haines

12 February 2019 32	Walsall	0–1	AFC Wimbledon	Walsall
19:45 GMT	Cook (yellow card) 81'	Report	Hartigan (yellow card) 3'; Oshilaja (yellow card) 15'; Seddon 48' (yellow card) 49'	Stadium: Bescot Stadium; Attendance: 3,287; Referee: Chris Sarginson

19 February 2019 33	Rochdale	3–4	AFC Wimbledon	Rochdale
19:45 GMT	Pyke 2'; Hamilton 37'; Henderson 81'	Report	Pigott 36', 46', 90+5' (pen.) (yellow card) 90+6'; Wordsworth 76'; McDonald (yellow card) 88'	Stadium: Spotland Stadium; Attendance: 2,410; Referee: Michael Salisbury

23 February 2019 34	AFC Wimbledon	1–2	Charlton Athletic	Kingston upon Thames
15:00 GMT	Folivi 24'; Thomas (yellow card) 50'; Sibbick (yellow card) 69'; Seddon (yellow card) 90+2'	Report	Marshall (yellow card) 21'; Sarr 51' (yellow card) 53'; Vetokele 90+1'; Williams (yellow card) 90+4'	Stadium: Kingsmeadow; Attendance: 4,532; Referee: Chris Kavanagh

===== March =====
2 March 2019 35	Shrewsbury Town	0–0	AFC Wimbledon	Shrewsbury
15:00 GMT		Report		Stadium: New Meadow; Attendance: 6,166; Referee: Anthony Backhouse

9 March 2019 36	AFC Wimbledon	2–0	Doncaster Rovers	Kingston upon Thames
15:00 GMT	Wagstaff (yellow card) 44'; Seddon 67'; McLoughlin 90+3'	Report	Marquis (yellow card) 44' (yellow-red card) 51'	Stadium: Kingsmeadow; Attendance: 4,203; Referee: Paul Marsden

12 March 2019 37	AFC Wimbledon	1–0	Peterborough United	Kingston upon Thames
19:45 GMT	Sibbick (yellow card) 76'; Pigott 87' (pen.)	Report	Maddison (yellow card) 74'; Bennett (red card) 85'; Lafferty (yellow card) 86'; Reed (yellow card) 90+3'	Stadium: Kingsmeadow; Attendance: 3,737; Referee: Ollie Yates

16 March 2019 38	Southend United	0–1	AFC Wimbledon	Southend
15:00 GMT	Hart (yellow card) 79'	Report	Wordsworth (yellow card) 52'; Pigott 67'	Stadium: Roots Hall; Attendance: 7,570; Referee: Brett Huxtable

23 March 2019 39	AFC Wimbledon	2–4	Gillingham	Kingston upon Thames
15:00 GMT	Folivi 22'; Pigott (yellow card) 34'; Seddon (yellow card) 52'; Hanson 90+7'	Report	Byrne (yellow card) 32'; Hanlan 40'; Burke 42'; Ehmer (yellow card) 48'; Lopes 50'; Eaves 83'	Stadium: Kingsmeadow; Attendance: 4,847; Referee: Lee Collins

30 March 2019 40	Scunthorpe United	1–2	AFC Wimbledon	Scunthorpe
15:00 GMT	Lee Novak 78'	Report	James Hanson 23', 29'	Stadium: Glanford Park; Attendance: 3,955; Referee: Matt Donohue

===== April =====
6 April 2019 41	AFC Wimbledon	1–1	Accrington Stanley	Kingston upon Thames
15:00 BST	Piggott 21'; Kalambayi (yellow card) 37'; Hanson (yellow card) 71'; Connolly (yellow card) 78'	Report	Smyth (yellow card) 4'; Brown (yellow card) 29'; Clark 34', (yellow card) 70'	Stadium: Kingsmeadow; Attendance: 4,565; Referee: Neil Hair

13 April 2019 42	Oxford United	0–0	AFC Wimbledon	Oxford
15:00 BST		Report		Stadium: Kassam Stadium; Attendance: 7,678; Referee: Alan Young

19 April 2019 43	AFC Wimbledon	1–1	Bristol Rovers	Kingston upon Thames
15:00 BST	Pigott 22'; Nightingale (yellow card) 49'	Report	Lockyer (yellow card) 43'; Clarke (yellow card) 47' (goal) 78'	Stadium: Kingsmeadow; Attendance: 4,850; Referee: Graham Salisbury

23 April 2019 44	Luton Town	2–2	AFC Wimbledon	Luton
19:45 BST	Lee 8'; Collins 39'; LuaLua (yellow card) 70'; Berry (yellow card) 86'	Report	Pigott (yellow card) 19' (goal) 28'; Seddon (yellow card) 38' (goal) 90+3'	Stadium: Kenilworth Road; Attendance: 10,070; Referee: Ben Toner

27 April 2019 45	AFC Wimbledon	2–1	Wycombe Wanderers	Kingston upon Thames
15:00 BST	Pigott (penalty missed) 12' 38', 53'	Report	Allsop (yellow card) 11'; El-Abd (yellow card) 37'; Samuel 49'	Stadium: Kingsmeadow; Attendance: 4,850; Referee: Andy Davies

===== May =====
4 May 2019 46	Bradford City	0–0	AFC Wimbledon	Bradford
17:30 BST		Report	Wordsworth (yellow card) 87'	Stadium: Valley Parade; Attendance: 17,817; Referee: Brett Huxtable

=== FA Cup ===
The first round draw was made live on BBC by Dennis Wise and Dion Dublin on 22 October. The draw for the second round was made live on BBC and BT by Mark Schwarzer and Glenn Murray on 12 November. The third round draw was made live on BBC by Ruud Gullit and Paul Ince from Stamford Bridge on 3 December 2018. The fourth round draw was made live on BBC by Robbie Keane and Carl Ikeme from Wolverhampton on 7 January 2019. The fifth round draw was broadcast on 28 January 2019 live on BBC, Alex Scott and Ian Wright conducted the draw.

9 November 2018 First round	Haringey Borough	0–1	AFC Wimbledon	Tottenham
19:55 GMT		Report	Pinnock 90'	Stadium: Coles Park; Attendance: 2,710; Referee: Michael Salisbury

1 December 2018 Second round	FC Halifax Town	1–3	AFC Wimbledon	Halifax
12:30 GMT	Hanson 86' (o.g.)	Report	Purrington 42'; Wordsworth 73'; Pigott 75'	Stadium: The Shay; Attendance: 2,044; Referee: Ben Toner

5 January 2019 Third round	Fleetwood Town	2–3	AFC Wimbledon	Fleetwood
15:00 GMT	Madden 70'; Evans 72' (pen.); Morgan (yellow card) 89'	Report	Kalambayi (yellow card) 11'; Barcham 16'; Appiah (yellow card) 29' (goal) 90'; Hartigan 55'; Wordsworth (yellow card) 71'	Stadium: Highbury Stadium; Referee: Ross Joyce

26 January 2019 Fourth round	AFC Wimbledon	4–2	West Ham United	Kingston upon Thames
15:00 GMT	Appiah 34'; Wagstaff 41', 46'; Sibbick 88'	Report	Pérez 57'; Fredericks (yellow card) 67'; Felipe Anderson 71'; Masuaku (yellow card) 79'	Stadium: Kingsmeadow; Attendance: 4,777; Referee: Anthony Taylor

16 February 2019 Fifth round	AFC Wimbledon	0–1	Millwall	Kingston upon Thames
15:00 GMT	Wordsworth (yellow card) 69'	Report	Wallace 5' (yellow card) 75'	Stadium: Kingsmeadow; Attendance: 4,795; Referee: Jonathan Moss

=== EFL Cup ===
On 15 June 2018, the draw for the first round was made in Vietnam. The second round draw was made from the Stadium of Light on 16 August.

13 August 2018 First round	Portsmouth	1–2	AFC Wimbledon	Portsmouth
19:00 BST	Burgess 49'; Close (yellow card) 62'; Naylor (yellow card) 64'	Report	Sources (yellow card) 69'; Pigott 76'; Walkes 88' (o.g.)	Stadium: Fratton Park; Attendance: 6588; Referee: Ollie Yates

28 August 2018 Second round	AFC Wimbledon	1–3	West Ham United	Kingston upon Thames
19:45 BST	Pigott 2'; McDonald (red card) 18'	Report	Diop 63'; Ogbonna 83'; Hernández 90+2'	Stadium: Kingsmeadow; Attendance: 3,962; Referee: Tim Robinson

=== EFL Trophy ===
On 13 July 2018, the initial group stage draw bar the U21 invited clubs was announced. The draw for the second round was made live on Talksport by Leon Britton and Steve Claridge on 16 November.

Pos	Lge	Team	Pld	W	PW	PL	L	GF	GA	GD	Pts	Qualification
1	ACA	Swansea City U21 (Q)	3	2	0	0	1	2	5	−3	6	Round 2
2	L1	AFC Wimbledon (Q)	3	1	1	0	1	6	3	+3	5	Round 2
3	L1	Charlton Athletic (E)	3	1	0	1	1	10	3	+7	4	
4	L2	Stevenage (E)	3	1	0	0	2	5	12	−7	3	

First match(es) will be played: 4 September 2018. Source: EFL.com
(E) Eliminated; (Q) Qualified to the phase indicated

4 September 2018 Group stages	Charlton Athletic	2–2 (2–4 p)	AFC Wimbledon	Charlton
19:45 BST	Sarr 43'; Mascoll 84'	Report	Hartigan 27'; Soares 49'	Stadium: The Valley; Attendance: 1,244; Referee: Kevin Johnson
	Penalties
	Ajose (penalty missed); Morgan (penalty scored); Lapslie (penalty missed); Hackett-Fairchild (penalty scored)		Appiah (penalty scored); Hartigan (penalty scored); Pinnock (penalty scored); Hanson (penalty scored)

18 September 2018 Group stages	AFC Wimbledon	0–1	Swansea City U21	Kingston upon Thames
19:45 BST		Report	Lewis 90'	Stadium: Kingsmeadow

6 November 2018 Group stages	AFC Wimbledon	4–0	Stevenage	Kingston upon Thames
19:45	Appiah 1'; Wordsworth 28'; Garratt 68'; Egan 79'	Report		Stadium: Kingsmeadow; Referee: Gavin Ward

4 December 2018 Second round	Chelsea U21	2–1	AFC Wimbledon	Fulham
19:00 GMT	Brown 37' (pen.); Redan 47'	Report	Wordsworth 70' (red card) 88'	Stadium: Stamford Bridge

== Squad ==
As of 6 October 2018

No.	Name	Pos.	Nat.	Place of Birth	Age	L. Apps	L. Goals	Int. Caps	Int. Goals	Signed from	Date signed	Fee	Ends
Goalkeepers
1	Tom King	GK	(England)	Plymouth	31	8	0	0	0	Millwall	27 June 2018	Loan	1 July 2019
24	Joe McDonnell	GK	(England)	Basingstoke	32	12	0	0	0	Basingstoke Town	5 July 2014	Undisclosed	1 July 2020
25	Nik Tzanev	GK	(New Zealand)	Wellington, New Zealand	29	0	0	1	0	Brentford	8 May 2017	Free	1 July 2020
35	Aaron Ramsdale	GK	(England)	Chesterton	28	8	0	0	0	Bournemouth	2 January 2019	Loan	1 July 2019
Defenders
2	Tennai Watson	RB	(England)	Hillingdon, London	29	18	0	0	0	Reading	10 July 2018	Loan	1 July 2019
3	Ben Purrington	LB	(England)	Exeter	30	12	0	0	0	Rotherham United	1 August 2018	Loan	1 July 2019
4	Deji Oshilaja	CB	(England)	Bermondsey, London	33	76	3	0	0	Cardiff City	8 June 2017	Free	1 July 2019
5	Will Nightingale	CB	(England)	Roehampton, London	31	45	1	0	0	Academy	6 May 2014	Trainee	1 July 2019
6	Terell Thomas	CB	(England)	Rainham, London	31	0	0	0	0	Wigan Athletic	16 July 2018	Undisclosed	1 July 2020
12	Tyler Garratt	LB	(England)	Lincoln	30	2	0	0	0	Doncaster Rovers	2 August 2018	Loan	1 July 2019
20	Toby Sibbick	RB	(England)	Hounslow, London	27	7	0	0	0	Academy	26 August 2016	Trainee	1 July 2019
23	Tom Scott	LB	(England)			0	0	0	0	Academy		Trainee	1 July 2019
26	Rod McDonald	CB	(England)	Liverpool	34	7	0	0	0	Coventry City	2 August 2018	Undisclosed	1 July 2020
30	Paul Kalambayi	CB	(England)	Dulwich, London	27	0	0	0	0	Academy	18 February 2016	Trainee	1 July 2019
37	Osaze Urhoghide	CB	(Netherlands)	Netherlands	26	0	0	0	0	Academy	6 April 2018	Trainee	1 July 2019
Midfielders
7	Scott Wagstaff	RW	(England)	Maidstone	36	12	2	0	0	Gillingham	11 July 2018	Free	1 July 2020
8	Anthony Hartigan	CM	(England)	Kingston upon Thames, London	26	12	0	0	0	Academy	27 January 2017	Trainee	1 July 2020
11	Mitchell Pinnock	RW	(England)	Gravesend	31	9	0	0	0	Dover Athletic	15 June 2018	Undisclosed	1 July 2020
14	Liam Trotter	CM	(England)	Ipswich	38	54	4	0	0	Bolton Wanderers	21 July 2017	Free	1 July 2019
17	Andy Barcham	LW	(England)	Basildon	39	126	14	0	0	Portsmouth	1 July 2015	Free	1 July 2019
19	Tom Soares	DM	(England)	Reading	40	55	1	0	0	Bury	31 January 2017	Undisclosed	1 July 2019
21	Egli Kaja	RW	(Albania)	Kosovo	29	21	0	0	0	Academy	17 April 2015	Trainee	1 July 2020
27	Neşet Bellikli	LW	(Turkey)	Sutton, London	28	0	0	0	0	Academy	16 May 2016	Trainee	1 July 2019
28	Alfie Egan	AM	(England)	Lambeth, London	29	10	0	0	0	Academy	5 February 2016	Trainee	1 July 2019
29	Kosta Sparta	RW	(Australia)		27	0	0	0	0	Reading	1 July 2018	Free	1 July 2020
32	Tyler Burey	AM	(England)	Hillingdon, London	25	0	0	0	0	Academy		Trainee	1 July 2020
36	Ossama Ashley	LW	(England)	Greenwich, London	25	0	0	0	0	Academy	16 May 2016	Trainee	1 July 2019
40	Anthony Wordsworth	CM	(England)	Camden, London	37	8	0	0	0	Southend United	12 July 2018	Free	1 July 2020
Forwards
9	Kwesi Appiah	CF	(Ghana)	Thamesmead, London	36	31	8	6	1	Crystal Palace	31 May 2017	Free	1 July 2019
10	Jake Jervis	CF	(England)	Wolverhampton	35	6	0	0	0	Luton Town	31 August 2018	Loan	1 July 2019
18	James Hanson	CF	(England)	Bradford	39	7	0	0	0	Sheffield United	26 June 2018	Undisclosed	1 July 2020
22	Tommy Wood	CF	(England)	Hillingdon, London	27	0	0	0	0	Burnley	22 May 2018	Free	1 July 2020
31	Kane Crichlow	CF	(Bermuda)	Warwick, Bermuda	26	0	0	0	0			Free	
39	Joe Pigott	CF	(England)	Maidstone	32	30	9	0	0	Maidstone United	15 January 2018	Undisclosed	1 July 2021

== Transfers ==
=== Transfers in ===
Date from	Position	Nationality	Name	From	Fee	Ref.
1 July 2018	CF	(England)	James Hanson	Sheffield United	Undisclosed	
1 July 2018	LW	(England)	Mitchell Pinnock	Dover Athletic	Tribunal	
1 July 2018	RM	(Australia)	Kosta Sparta	Reading	Free transfer	
1 July 2018	CF	(England)	Tommy Wood	Burnley	Free transfer	
11 July 2018	RM	(England)	Scott Wagstaff	Gillingham	Free transfer	
12 July 2018	CM	(England)	Anthony Wordsworth	Southend United	Free transfer	
16 July 2018	CB	(England)	Terell Thomas	Wigan Athletic	Undisclosed	
2 August 2018	CB	(England)	Rod McDonald	Coventry City	Undisclosed	
30 August 2018	RB	(England)	Kyron Stabana	Derby County	Free transfer	
8 November 2018	LB	(England)	James O'Halloran	Maidstone United	Undisclosed	
3 January 2019	AM	(Republic of Ireland)	Dylan Connolly	(Republic of Ireland) Dundalk	Undisclosed	
31 January 2019	AM	(Republic of Ireland)	Shane McLoughlin	Ipswich Town	Free transfer	

=== Transfers out ===
Date from	Position	Nationality	Name	To	Fee	Ref.
1 July 2018	CF	(England)	Jayden Antwi-Nyame	Free agent	Released	
1 July 2018	CB	(England)	Darius Charles	Wycombe Wanderers	Free transfer	
1 July 2018	RM	(England)	George Francomb	Crawley Town	Released	
1 July 2018	RB	(England)	Barry Fuller	Gillingham	Released	
1 July 2018	LB	(England)	Callum Kennedy	Billericay Town	Released	
1 July 2018	LB	(England)	Seth Owens	Maldon & Tiptree F.C.	Released	
1 July 2018	CM	(England)	Dean Parrett	Gillingham	Free transfer	
1 July 2018	LM	(England)	Richard Pingling	Merstham F.C.	Released	
1 July 2018	CB	(England)	Paul Robinson	Havant & Waterlooville	Released	
1 July 2018	RW	(Ghana)	Lloyd Sam	Free agent	Released	
1 July 2018	CF	(Montserrat)	Lyle Taylor	Charlton Athletic	Free transfer	
31 July 2018	LB	(Wales)	Jonathan Meades	Retired	—N/a	
2 August 2018	CF	(England)	Cody McDonald	Ebbsfleet United	Mutual consent	
19 February 2019	CM	(England)	Liam Trotter	(United States) Orange County	Mutual consent	
22 March 2019	RW	(Australia)	Kosta Sparta	Free agent	Released	

=== Loans in ===
Start date	Position	Nationality	Name	From	End date	Ref.
1 July 2018	GK	(England)	Tom King	Millwall	10 January 2019	
10 July 2018	RB	(England)	Tennai Watson	Reading	31 May 2019	
1 August 2018	LB	(England)	Ben Purrington	Rotherham United	9 January 2019	
2 August 2018	LB	(England)	Tyler Garratt	Doncaster Rovers	31 May 2019	
31 August 2018	RW	(England)	Jake Jervis	Luton Town	31 May 2019	
4 January 2019	GK	(England)	Aaron Ramsdale	Bournemouth	31 May 2019	
16 January 2019	LB	(England)	Steve Seddon	Birmingham City	31 May 2019	
31 January 2019	FW	(England)	Michael Folivi	Watford	31 May 2019	

=== Loans out ===
Start date	Position	Nationality	Name	To	End date	Ref.
20 July 2018	SS	(Albania)	Egli Kaja	(Scotland) Livingston	14 December 2018	
10 August 2018	MF	(England)	Alfie Egan	East Thurrock United	11 October 2018	
18 January 2019	GK	(New Zealand)	Nik Tzanev	Potters Bar Town	February 2019	
8 February 2019	CF	(England)	Tommy Wood	Slough Town	March 2019	
5 March 2019	RB	(England)	Kyron Stabana	Tamworth	April 2019	
14 March 2019	CF	(England)	Tommy Wood	Burgess Hill Town	31 May 2019	
22 March 2019	MF	(England)	Alfie Egan	Kingstonian	31 May 2019	
22 March 2019	MF	(England)	Jack Rudoni	Corinthian-Casuals	31 May 2019	
28 March 2019	FB	(England)	James O'Halloran	Kingstonian	27 April 2019	
