= AFC Wimbledon Development Squad and Academy =

AFC Wimbledon Academy
- Full name: AFC Wimbledon
- Nicknames: The Dons, The Wombles
- Founded: 2003
- Ground: Plough Lane
- Chairman: Mick Buckley
- Manager: Michael Hamilton (Academy Manager)
- League: Football League Youth Alliance
- 2019-20: 1st (Merit League One)
- Website: http://www.afcwimbledon.co.uk/
Home colours	Away colours	Third colours

AFC Wimbledon Development squad and Academy are the youth teams of professional English association football club AFC Wimbledon. Under the Elite Player Performance Plan (EPPP) system for youth development, the academy has been granted Category Three status. The Under-18 squad currently competes in Football League Youth Alliance South East Conference. The Under 18's squad play their home matches in the FA Youth Cup at Kingsmeadow, in Kingston upon Thames, London. Whilst the Under 23's play a majority of their matches at Merstham F.C. most other matches are held at the club's New Malden training complex. The development squad competes in the Under–21 Premier League Cup.

== History ==
The AFC Wimbledon Academy was founded in 2003. In 2010, the Under-13s squad won the Tesco Cup, having triumphed through the County and Regional rounds of the competition, by beating Lytham St Annes YMCA 2–0 in the final.

=== Current academy and youth development staff ===
Name	Role
(England) Michael Hamilton	Academy Manager
(England) Michael Cook	Academy Head of Operations
(England) Anthony Ferguson	Head of Coaching
(England) James Oliver Pearce	Under 18s Head Coach
(England) Jack Matthews	Lead Youth Phase Coach (U13-16)
(England) Nicholas Wright	Lead Foundation Phase Coach
(England) Liam Connor	Head of Physical Performance
(England) Jenna Richards	Physical Performance and Medicine Manager
(England) Stuart Page	Head of Education
(England) Ben Fosuhene	Head of Academy Talent ID
(England) Ahmed Jama	Head of Academy Performance Analysis
(Portugal) Diogo Santos	Youth Development Phase Coach
(England) Conor Martin	Academy Club Journalist
(England) Deji Olorukoba-Oseni	Academy Administrator

== Current Youth Development Squads ==
=== Under-18s squad ===
Under the Elite Player Performance Plan (EPPP) system for youth development, the AFC Wimbledon Academy has been granted Category Three Academy status. The club currently competes in the Merit League One of the Football Youth Alliance.

== Honours ==
English Football League Youth Alliance

- Football League Youth Alliance South East Division
- Winners: 2021–22, 2025–26
- EFL Youth Alliance Cup
- Winners: 2019–20, 2025–26
- Youth Alliance National Playoff Final
- Winners: 2025–26

EFL U17 Floodlit Cup

- Winners:2023–24

U12 Premier League National Cup

- Winners:2024–25

U18 PDL Cup

- Winners: 2025–26

== Notable Academy graduates ==
Players in bold went on to sign professional contracts and are currently playing for the senior first team. Players in italics subsequently went on to be signed by a Premier League club.

- (Ghana) Dan Agyei
- (England) Jayden Antwi
- (England) **Ossama Ashley**
- (England) Tom Beere
- (England) Neşet Bellikli
- (England) **Tyler Burey**
- (England) Josef Bursik
- (England) **Alfie Egan**
- (England) Great Evans
- (England) Jim Fenlon
- (England) Dan Gallagher
- (Malta) Luke Gambin
- (England) Ben Harrison
- (England) **Anthony Hartigan**
- (England) Chris Hussey
- (England) Femi Ilesanmi
- (England) Ryan Jackson
- (England) Huw Johnson
- (Albania) **Egli Kaja**
- (England) **Paul Kalambayi**
- (England) Brendan Kiernan
- (England) Will Mannion
- (England) Frankie Merrifield
- (England) Ethan Nelson-Roberts
- (England) **Will Nightingale**
- (England) George Oakley
- (England) Toyosi Olusanya
- (Uganda) **Toby Sibbick**
- (Republic of Ireland) Ryan Sweeney
- (England) Jack Turner
