= 2017–18 AFC Wimbledon season =

AFC Wimbledon
2017–18 season
- Chairman: Erik Samuelson
- Manager: Neal Ardley
- Stadium: Kingsmeadow
- League One: 18th
- FA Cup: Third round vs Tottenham Hotspur (6 January 2018)
- EFL Cup: First round vs Brentford (8 August 2017)
- EFL Trophy: Second round vs Yeovil Town (5 December 2017)
- Top goalscorer: League: Lyle Taylor 8 All: Lyle Taylor 11
- Highest home attendance: 4,850 vs Oldham Athletic (21 April 2018)
- Lowest home attendance: 3,819 vs Gillingham (12 September 2017)
- Average home league attendance: 4,181
Home colours	Away colours	Third colours

The 2017–18 season was AFC Wimbledon's 16th season in their history and their second season in League One.

== League table ==
Pos	Team	Pld	W	D	L	GF	GA	GD	Pts
16	Oxford United	46	15	11	20	61	66	−5	56
17	Gillingham	46	13	17	16	50	55	−5	56
18	AFC Wimbledon	46	13	14	19	47	58	−11	53
19	Walsall	46	13	13	20	53	66	−13	52
20	Rochdale	46	11	18	17	49	57	−8	51

Source: BBC Sport
Rules for classification: 1) Points; 2) Goal difference; 3) Number of goals scored

=== Results summary ===
Round	1	2	3	4	5	6	7	8	9	10	11	12	13	14	15	16	17	18	19	20	21	22	23	24	25	26	27	28	29	30	31	32	33	34	35	36	37	38	39	40	41	42	43	44	45	46
Ground	A	H	A	H	A	H	H	A	H	A	H	A	A	H	H	A	H	A	A	H	H	H	A	A	H	A	H	A	A	A	H	A	H	A	H	H	A	A	H	H	H	A	H	A	A	H
Result	D	L	L	W	L	L	D	W	L	L	D	L	W	W	L	L	D	W	D	L	L	W	L	D	W	D	W	W	L	L	L	L	W	D	L	W	D	L	L	D	W	W	D	D	D	D
Position	11	17	22	16	16	18	20	16	19	20	21	21	21	18	19	20	21	19	19	20	23	21	21	21	21	22	19	16	18	19	20	21	18	18	18	18	18	19	20	20	19	18	18	19	19	18

Updated to match(es) played on 28 April 2018. Source: BBC Sport
A = Away; H = Home; W = Win; D = Draw; L = Loss

Overall								Home						Away					
Pld	W	D	L	GF	GA	GD	Pts	W	D	L	GF	GA	GD	W	D	L	GF	GA	GD
46	13	14	19	47	58	−11	53	8	6	9	25	30	−5	5	8	10	22	28	−6

Last updated: 28 April 2018.
Source: BBC Sport

=== Score overview ===
Win Draw Loss

Opposition	Home	Away	Dou.	Agg.
Blackburn Rovers	0–3	0–1	No	1–3
Blackpool	2–0	1–0	No	2–1
Bradford City	2–1	0–4	Yes	6–1
Bristol Rovers	1–0	1–3	Yes	4–1
Bury	2-2	2–1	No	3–4
Charlton Athletic	1–0	0–1	No	1–1
Doncaster Rovers	2–0	0–0	No	2–0
Fleetwood Town	0–1	2–0	No	0–3
Gillingham	1–1	2–2	No	3–3
Milton Keynes Dons	0–2	0–0	No	0–2
Northampton Town	1–3	0–1	No	2–3
Oldham Athletic	2–2	0–0	No	2–2
Oxford United	2–1	3–0	No	2–4
Peterborough United	2–2	1–1	No	3–3
Plymouth Argyle	0–1	4–2	No	2–5
Portsmouth	0–2	2–1	No	1–4
Rochdale	0–0	1–1	No	1–1
Rotherham United	3-1	2-0	No	3-3
Scunthorpe United	1–1	1–1	No	2–2
Shrewsbury Town	0–1	1–0	No	0–2
Southend United	2–0	1–0	No	2–1
Walsall	1–2	2–3	No	4–4
Wigan Athletic	0–4	1–1	No	1–5

Last updated: 11 April 2018.
Source: BBC Sport

== Matches ==
=== Pre-season friendlies ===
8 July 2017	Eastleigh	P–P	AFC Wimbledon	Eastleigh
15:00 BST				Stadium: Ten Acres

15 July 2017 Football Manager Cup	AFC Wimbledon	3–2	Watford	Kingsmeadow
15:00 BST	McDonald 46' 49'; Egan 87'	Report	Watson 57'; Berghuis 77'	Attendance: 2,101

21 July 2017 Friendly	AFC Wimbledon	3–0	Burton Albion	Kingsmeadow
19:45 BST	Parrett 42'; McDonald 45'; Antwi 84'	Report

25 July 2017 Cherry Red Records Cup	Wycombe Wanderers	2–0	AFC Wimbledon	Adams Park
19:45 BST	O'Nien 22'; Akinfenwa 33'	Report

28 July 2017 Friendly	Aldershot Town	1–1	AFC Wimbledon	Recreation Ground
19:30 BST	Taylor 1'		Appiah 4'	Attendance: 982

29 July 2017 Friendly	Ebbsfleet United	1–2	AFC Wimbledon	Stonebridge Road Stadium
15:00 BST	Powell 63'	Report	Fuller 60'; Barcham 69'

=== League One ===
==== August ====
5 August 2017 1	Scunthorpe United	1–1	AFC Wimbledon	Glanford Park
15:00 BST	Townsend 6'	Report	Abdou 67' (yellow card) 68'	Attendance: 4,398 (434 away fans); Referee: Michael Salisbury

12 August 2017 2	AFC Wimbledon	0–1	Shrewsbury Town	Kingsmeadow
15:00 BST	Oshilaja (yellow card) 48'; Francomb (yellow card) 90+3'	Report	Rodman 8'; Brown (yellow card) 55'; Bolton (yellow card) 61'	Attendance: 3,981; Referee: Charles Breakspear

19 August 2017 3	Fleetwood Town	2–0	AFC Wimbledon	Highbury Stadium
15:00 BST	Cole 19' 57'; Eastham (yellow card) 59'; Hiwula (yellow card) 78'	Report	Robinson (yellow card) 49'	Attendance: 2,730; Referee: John Brooks

26 August 2017 4	AFC Wimbledon	2–0	Doncaster Rovers	Kingsmeadow
15:00 BST	Oshilaja (yellow card) 48'; Appiah 58'; Barcham 60'	Report	Marquis (yellow card) 41'; Rowe (yellow card) 83'; Butler (yellow card) 90+6'	Attendance: 4,144; Referee: Gavin Ward

==== September ====
2 September 2017 5	Blackpool	1–0	AFC Wimbledon	Blackpool
15:00 BST	Longstaff 52'; Tilt (yellow card) 69'	Report	Francomb (yellow card) 41'; Abdou (red card) 53'; Trotter (yellow card) 67'; Robinson (yellow card) 90+3'	Stadium: Bloomfield Road; Attendance: 3,457 (508 away fans); Referee: Carl Boyeson

9 September 2017 6	AFC Wimbledon	0–2	Portsmouth	Kingsmeadow
15:00 BST		Report	O'Keefe (yellow card) 14'; Pitman 38' (pen.); Chaplin 50'; Kennedy (yellow card) 63'; Burgess (yellow card) 79'	Attendance: 4,585; Referee: Kevin Johnson

12 September 2017 7	AFC Wimbledon	1–1	Gillingham	Kingsmeadow
19:45 BST	Barcham 35'; Oshilaja (yellow card) 42'; Taylor (yellow card) 45+3'; Nightingale (yellow card) 65'	Report	Martin (red card) 45+3'; Wagstaff (yellow card) 45+3'; Clare 45+4'; Eaves (yellow card) 81'; Byrne (yellow card) 82'	Attendance: 3,819; Referee: Nick Kinseley

16 September 2017 8	Blackburn Rovers	0–1	AFC Wimbledon	Ewood Park
15:00 BST	Bennett (yellow card) 69'; Evans (yellow card) 89'	Report	Appiah 16'; Nightingale (yellow card) 60'; Fuller (yellow card) 86'	Attendance: 10,833 (369 away fans); Referee: Trevor Kettle

22 September 2017 9	AFC Wimbledon	0–2	Milton Keynes Dons	Kingsmeadow
19:45 BST	Hartigan (yellow card) 18'; Francomb (yellow card) 52'; Fuller (yellow card) 55'	Report	Seager 7'; Ariyibi 26'; Tshibola (yellow card) 51'; Muirhead (yellow card) 76'	Attendance: 3,973; Referee: Mike Jones

26 September 2017 10	Southend United	1–0	AFC Wimbledon	Roots Hall
19:45 BST	Demetriou 60'; Demetriou (yellow card) 73'	Report	McDonald (yellow card) 63'	Attendance: 5,881 (307 away fans); Referee: Graham Horwood

30 September 2017 11	AFC Wimbledon	0–0	Rochdale	Kingsmeadow
15:00 BST		Report	Williams (yellow card) 31'; Bunney (yellow card) 50'	Attendance: 3,861; Referee: Chris Sarginson

==== October ====
7 October 2017 12	Oxford United	3–0	AFC Wimbledon	Kassam Stadium
15:00 BST	Thomas 12'; Ricardinho 48'; Xemi 85'	Report		Attendance: 7,241; Referee: Darren Drysdale

14 October 2017 13	Northampton Town	0–1	AFC Wimbledon	Sixfields Stadium
15:00 BST	Waters (yellow card) 37'; Moloney (yellow card) 52'; McWilliams (yellow card) 61'; O'Toole (yellow card) 88'	Report	Barcham (yellow card) 34'; Forrester 61'	Attendance: 5,306; Referee: Graham Salisbury

17 October 2017 14	AFC Wimbledon	3–1	Rotherham United	Kingsmeadow
19:45 BST	Taylor 15' 85' 90+2'	Report	Newell 70'; Forde (yellow card) 76'; Ball (yellow card) 78'	Attendance: 3,907; Referee: Dean Whitestone

21 October 2017 15	AFC Wimbledon	0–1	Plymouth Argyle	Kingsmeadow
15:00 BST	Fuller (yellow card) 40'; Barcham (yellow card) 50'	Report	Grant 64'	Attendance: 4,848; Referee: Martin Coy

28 October 2017 16	Charlton Athletic	1–0	AFC Wimbledon	The Valley
15:00 BST	Bauer (yellow card) 73'; Holmes 78'; Kashi (yellow card) 81'	Report	Francomb (yellow card) 18'; Trotter (yellow card) 37'; Long (yellow card) 57'; Fuller (yellow card) 78'	Attendance: 12,575; Referee: Ben Toner

==== November ====
12 November 2017 17	AFC Wimbledon	2–2	Peterborough United	Kingsmeadow
14:30 GMT	Taylor 1'; McDonald 45'; Francomb (yellow card) 82'; Trotter (yellow card) 85'	Report	Lloyd 26'; Maddison 38' (pen.) (yellow card) 85'	Attendance: 4,220; Referee: Darren Handley

18 November 2017 18	Bristol Rovers	1–3	AFC Wimbledon	Memorial Stadium
15:00 GMT	Sinclair (yellow card) 14'; Brown 88'	Report	Barcham 2'; Forrester 45+2' (yellow card) 78'; McDonald 61'	Attendance: 8,734; Referee: John Brooks

21 November 2017 19	Oldham Athletic	0–0	AFC Wimbledon	Boundary Park
19:45 GMT	Bryan (yellow card) 14'	Report	Long (yellow card) 90+3'	Attendance: 3,169; Referee: Robert Lewis

25 November 2017 20	AFC Wimbledon	1–2	Walsall	Kingsmeadow
15:00 GMT	Taylor 36'; Forrester (yellow card) 38'	report	Oztumer 15'; Bakayoko 31'; Agyei (yellow card) 81'	Attendance: 4,130; Referee: John Busby

==== December ====
16 December 2017 21	AFC Wimbledon	0–4	Wigan Athletic	Kingsmeadow
15:00 GMT	Soares (yellow card) 49'; Oshilaja (yellow card) 53'; Forrester (yellow card) 55' (yellow card) 69' (red card); Charles (yellow card) 90+6'		Powell (yellow card) 54' (goal) 73'; Jacobs 57'; Massey (yellow card) 70'; Power 80'; Toney 90'	Attendance: 4,289; Referee: Brett Huxtable

23 December 2017 22	AFC Wimbledon	2–1	Bradford City	Kingsmeadow
15:00 GMT	McDonald 7'; Taylor (yellow card) 38' (goal) 70'; Abdou (yellow card) 67'; Soares (yellow card) 90+1'; Long (yellow card) 90+6'	Report	Taylor 47'	Attendance: 4,215; Referee: Graham Horwood

26 December 2017 23	Portsmouth	2–1	AFC Wimbledon	Fratton Park
15:00 GMT	Close 45'; Pitman 72' (pen.)	Report	Soares (yellow card) 9'; Barcham (yellow card) 26'; Taylor 50' (pen.); Fuller (yellow card) 71'; Trotter (yellow card) 89'	Attendance: 18,644; Referee: Lee Collins

30 December 2017 24	Gillingham	2–2	AFC Wimbledon	Priestfield Stadium
15:00 GMT	Francomb 62' (o.g.); Ehmer 69' (yellow card) 83'	Report	Taylor 67' (pen.); Abdou (yellow card) 72'; Forrester 84'	Attendance: 6,419; Referee: Robert Lewis

==== January ====
1 January 2018 25	AFC Wimbledon	2–0	Southend United	Kingsmeadow
15:00 GMT	Trotter 27'; Soares 48'	Report		Attendance: 4,392; Referee: John Busby

13 January 2018 26	Milton Keynes Dons	0–0	AFC Wimbledon	Stadium mk
15:00 GMT	Pawlett (yellow card) 75'	Report	Charles (yellow card) 62'	Attendance: 9,504; Referee: Paul Tierney

20 January 2018 27	AFC Wimbledon	2–0	Blackpool	Kingsmeadow
15:00 GMT	Trotter 49'; Pigott 77'; Soares (yellow card) 88'	Report	Delfouneso (yellow card) 79'	Attendance: 4,286; Referee: Darren Drysdale

27 January 2018 28	Bradford City	0–4	AFC Wimbledon	Valley Parade
15:00 GMT	Vincelot (yellow card) 90'	Report	Abdou 14' (yellow card) 37'; Barcham 59'; McDonald 65' (yellow card) 77' (goal) 80'	Attendance: 19,103; Referee: Geoff Eltringham

==== February ====
3 February 2018 29	Rotherham United	2–0	AFC Wimbledon	New York Stadium
15:00 GMT	Smith 14'; Ball 90+2'	Report	Soares (yellow card) 28'	Attendance: 8,330; Referee: Michael Salisbury

6 February 2018 30	Bury	2–1	AFC Wimbledon	Gigg Lane
19:45 GMT	Miller 17'; Bunn 43'; Edwards (yellow card) 61'; Thompson (yellow card) 74'	Report	Robinson (yellow card) 12'; Edwards 28' (o.g.); Pigott (yellow card) 60'	Attendance: 2,975; Referee: Robert Jones

10 February 2018 31	AFC Wimbledon	1–3	Northampton Town	Kingsmeadow
15:00 GMT	Oshilaja 47'	Report	Grimes 8' (pen.); Crooks 62'; Powell 72'	Attendance: 4,485 (741); Referee: Carl Boyeson

13 February 2018 32	Plymouth Argyle	4–2	AFC Wimbledon	Home Park
19:45 GMT	Carey 16'; Ness (yellow card) 27'; Fox 40'; R. Taylor 45+3'; Lameiras 67'; Sarcevic (yellow card) 71'; Makasi (yellow card) 87'	Report	L. Taylor 37' 59'; Charles (yellow card) 62'; Kennedy (yellow card) 74'	Attendance: 10,671; Referee: Brett Huxtable

17 February 2018 33	AFC Wimbledon	1–0	Bristol Rovers	Kingsmeadow
15:00 GMT	Pigott 90+3'	Report		Attendance: 4,837; Referee: Charles Breakspear

24 February 2018 34	Peterborough United	1–1	AFC Wimbledon	London Road Stadium
15:00 GMT	Maddison 79'	Report	Taylor 75'	Attendance: 5,146; Referee: Anthony Backhouse

27 February 2018 35	AFC Wimbledon	0–3	Blackburn Rovers	Kingsmeadow
19:45 GMT		Report	Nyambe (yellow card) 7'; Dack 30' 69'; Bennett 64'	Attendance: 4,401; Referee: Graham Scott

==== March ====
10 March 2018 36	AFC Wimbledon	2–1	Oxford United	Kingsmeadow
15:00 GMT	Taylor 32' (pen.); Meades 71'	Report	Kane 38'	Attendance: 4,592 (743 away); Referee: Christopher Sarginson

17 March 2018 37	Rochdale	1–1	AFC Wimbledon	Spotland Stadium
15:00 GMT	Cannon 25'; Henderson (yellow card) 31'	Report	Oshilaja 7'	Attendance: 2,667; Referee: Scott Oldham

24 March 2018 38	Shrewsbury Town	1–0	AFC Wimbledon	New Meadow
15:00 GMT	Payne 54'; Morris (yellow card) 56' (yellow-red card) 86'; Beckles (yellow card) 61'; Nsiala (yellow card) 90'	Report	Parrett (yellow card) 74'; Taylor (yellow card) 88'	Attendance: 6,456; Referee: Darren Drysdale

30 March 2018 39	AFC Wimbledon	0–1	Fleetwood Town	Kingsmeadow
15:00 BST	Soares (yellow card) 43'	Report	Sowerby 22'; Cairns (yellow card) 90+1'	Attendance: 4,378; Referee: Charles Breakspear

==== April ====
7 April 2018 40	AFC Wimbledon	1–1	Scunthorpe United	Kingsmeadow
15:00 BST	Nightingale 4'; Oshilaja (yellow card) 26'	Report	McArdle (yellow card) 82'; Novak 84'; Wallace (yellow card) 90'	Attendance: 4,055; Referee: Tom Nield

10 April 2018 41	AFC Wimbledon	1–0	Charlton Athletic	Kingsmeadow
19:45 BST	Taylor 45+1' (yellow card) 90'	Report	Pearce (yellow card) 90'	Attendance: 4,457; Referee: Craig Hicks

14 April 2018 42	Walsall	2–3	AFC Wimbledon	Bescot Stadium
15:00 BST	Fitzwater 6' (yellow card) 26'; Ngoy 45'; Leahy (yellow card) 80'	Report	Pigott 48' (yellow card) 83'; Taylor 65'; Parrett 90+6' (pen.)	Attendance: 4,663; Referee: Mark Heywood

21 April 2018 43	AFC Wimbledon	2–2	Oldham Athletic	Kingsmeadow
15:00 BST	Meades 10'; Pigott 68'; Oshilaja (yellow card) 90'	Report	Doyle (yellow card) 45'; Nazon 50' 74'; Byrne (yellow card) 83'	Attendance: 4,850; Referee: Andy Davies

28 April 2018 44	Wigan Athletic	1–1	AFC Wimbledon	DW Stadium
15:00 BST	Jacobs 69'	Report	Pigott 24'; Parrett (yellow card) 66'; Appiah (yellow card) 90'	Attendance: 12,554; Referee: Andy Woolmer

==== May ====
1 May 2018 45	Doncaster Rovers	0–0	AFC Wimbledon	Doncaster
19:45 BST		Report	Barcham (yellow card) 89'	Stadium: Keepmoat Stadium; Attendance: 7,094; Referee: John Brooks

5 May 2018 46	AFC Wimbledon	2-2	Bury	Kingsmeadow
17:30 BST	Parrett 12' (yellow card) 77'; Appiah 34'	Report	Danns 66'; Miller 85'	Attendance: 4,770; Referee: Darren Drysdale

=== FA Cup ===
On 16 October 2017, the draw for the first round took place with AFC Wimbledon hosting Lincoln City.

==== First round ====
At this stage, there were 80 clubs remaining in the competition (32 non-league teams progressing from the qualifying rounds and the 48 clubs from League One and League Two).

4 November 2017 First round	AFC Wimbledon	1–0	Lincoln City	Kingsmeadow
15:00 GMT	Taylor 7'	Report		Attendance: 3,394; Referee: Andy Woolmer

==== Second round ====
At this stage, there were 40 clubs remaining in the competition (10 non-league teams, 14 clubs from League One and 16 clubs League Two).

3 December 2017 Second round	AFC Wimbledon	3–1	Charlton Athletic	Kingsmeadow
14:00 GMT	McDonald 10'; Taylor 70' 81'	Report	Ahearne-Grant 22'	Attendance: 3,270; Referee: James Linington

==== Third round ====
A total of 64 clubs will play in the third round (10 League One teams, 9 League Two teams and 44 teams from the Premier League and Football League Championship entering in this round) plus either Gillingham or Carlisle United.

7 January 2018 Third round	Tottenham Hotspur	3–0	AFC Wimbledon	Wembley Stadium
15:00	Wanyama (yellow card) 48'; Kane 63' 65'; Vertonghen 71'	Report		Attendance: 47,527; Referee: David Coote

=== EFL Cup ===
On 16 June 2017, the draw for the EFL Cup took place. The draw was seeded based on the league finishing positions for clubs in the previous season and regionalised on a north-south basis. AFC Wimbledon are unseeded, and drawn at home against Brentford. Meaning for the first time in 7 years entering the competition Wimbledon had been drawn at home.

==== First round ====
The first round of the competition included 70 of the 72 Football League clubs: 24 from League Two, 24 from League One, and 22 from the Championship, with Hull City and Middlesbrough receiving a bye into the second round.

8 August 2017 First round	AFC Wimbledon	1–3 (a.e.t.)	Brentford	Kingsmeadow
19:45 BST	Robinson 25'; Oshilaja (yellow card) 85'	Report	Sawyers (yellow card) 60' (goal) 69'; Watkins 105+1'; Shaibu 119'	Attendance: 3,229; Referee: Dean Whitestone

=== EFL Trophy ===
On 7 July 2017, the Group round draw was made for the League One and League Two teams competing in the EFL Trophy. The first round will consist of 64 clubs (24 from League One, 24 from League Two and 16 Category 1 Academy Teams) split into 16 groups of 4 teams, regionalised on a north/south basis, with each group including one Academy Team. Each club will play each other once, either home or away, with the top 2 teams from each group progressing to the knock-out stages.

==== First round (Southern Group F) ====
If the scores are level at the end of a Group Match then each team is awarded 1 point. In addition, the match will be followed immediately by the taking of penalties and the team that wins the penalty shootout will be awarded 1 additional point. AFC Wimbledon qualified for the following round by finishing as runners-up.

Pos	Lge	Team	Pld	W	PW	PL	L	GF	GA	GD	Pts	Qualification
1	L2	Luton Town (Q)	3	1	2	0	0	5	4	+1	7	Round 2
2	L1	AFC Wimbledon (Q)	3	2	0	0	1	9	8	+1	6	Round 2
3	L2	Barnet (E)	3	1	0	1	1	6	6	0	4	
4	ACA	Tottenham Hotspur U21 (E)	3	0	0	1	2	6	8	−2	1	

Updated to match(es) played on 3 October 2017. Source: EFL.com
(E) Eliminated; (Q) Qualified to the phase indicated

29 August 2017 Southern Group F	Barnet	3–4	AFC Wimbledon	The Hive Stadium
20:00 BST	Bover 12'; Coulthirst 25'; Blackman 88'	Report	Hartigan 5'; Kaja 16'; McDonald 48'; Clough 56' (o.g.)	Attendance: 696; Referee: Dean Whitestone

3 October 2017 Southern Group F	AFC Wimbledon	4–3	Tottenham Hotspur U23s	Kingsmeadow
19:45 BST	Sibbick 19' 60'; Kaja 38'; Parrett 90+2'	Report	Tracey 16'; Shashoua 34'; Sterling 59'

31 October 2017 Southern Group F	AFC Wimbledon	1–2	Luton Town	Kingsmeadow
19:45 GMT	Taylor 14'; Meades (yellow card) 62'	Report	Shinnie 12', 72'; D'Ath (yellow card) 60'	Attendance: 581; Referee: Gavin Ward

==== Second round (Southern Section) ====
The draw for the second round took place on 10 November 2017, with 32 clubs (13 from League One, 11 from League Two and 8 Category 1 Academy sides) progressing from the previous round, continuing to be regionalised on a north/south basis, with each group winner from the previous round being drawn at home to a second placed team from a different qualifying group.

5 December 2017 Second round	Yeovil Town	2–0	AFC Wimbledon	Huish Park
19:45 GMT	Davies 49'; Gray 87'	Report	Kalambayi (yellow card) 25'; Abdou (yellow card) 62'	Attendance: 886; Referee: Graham Horwood

== Squad ==
As of 28 February 2018

No.	Name	Pos.	Nat.	Place of Birth	Age	L. Apps	L. Goals	Int. Caps	Int. Goals	Signed from	Date signed	Fee	Ends
Goalkeepers
1	George Long	GK	(England)	Sheffield	32	43	0	0	0	Sheffield United	4 July 2017	Loan	1 July 2018
24	Joe McDonnell	GK	(England)	Basingstoke	32	8	0	0	0	Basingstoke Town	5 July 2014	Undisclosed	1 July 2018
25	Nik Tzanev	GK	(New Zealand)	Wellington	29	0	0	0	0	Brentford	8 May 2017	Free	1 July 2019
Defenders
2	Barry Fuller	RB	(England)	Ashford	41	203	1	0	0	Barnet	28 May 2013	Free	1 July 2018
3	Jonathan Meades	LB	(Wales)	Gloucester	34	116	8	0	0	Oxford United	22 June 2015	Free	1 July 2018
4	Deji Oshilaja	CB	(Nigeria)	Bermondsey	33	64	3	0	0	Cardiff City	8 June 2017	Free	1 July 2019
5	Will Nightingale	CB	(England)	Roehampton	30	38	1	0	0	Academy	6 May 2014	Trainee	1 July 2019
6	Paul Robinson	CB	(England)	Barnet	44	101	5	0	0	Portsmouth	3 August 2015	Free	1 July 2018
20	Toby Sibbick	CB/RB	(England)	Hounslow	26	3	0	0	0	Academy	26 August 2016	Trainee	1 July 2018
23	Callum Kennedy	LB	(England)	Chertsey	36	79	1	0	0	Leyton Orient	7 July 2017	Free	1 July 2019
30	Paul Kalambayi	CB	(England)	Dulwich	26	0	0	0	0	Academy	18 February 2016	Trainee	1 July 2018
31	Seth Owens	LB/CB	(England)	Hackney	27	3	0	0	0	Brentford	16 August 2016	Free	1 July 2018
32	Darius Charles	CB	(England)	Ealing	38	72	2	0	0	Burton Albion	31 May 2016	Free	1 July 2018
Midfielders
7	George Francomb	RW/RB	(England)	Hackney	34	196	11	0	0	Norwich City	26 June 2013	Free	1 July 2018
8	Jimmy Abdou	DM	(Comoros)	Martigues	41	32	2	16	0	Millwall	15 July 2017	Loan	1 July 2018
11	Harry Forrester	AM	(England)	Milton Keynes	35	35	3	0	0	Rangers	23 August 2017	Loan	1 July 2018
14	Liam Trotter	AM/DM	(England)	Ipswich	37	42	3	0	0	Bolton Wanderers	21 July 2017	Free	1 July 2019
17	Andy Barcham	LW	(England)	Basildon	39	113	14	0	0	Portsmouth	1 July 2015	Free	1 July 2019
18	Dean Parrett	CM	(England)	Hampstead	34	53	6	0	0	Stevenage	1 July 2016	Free	1 July 2018
19	Tom Soares	DM	(England)	Reading	39	45	1	0	0	Bury	31 January 2017	Undisclosed	1 July 2019
26	Anthony Hartigan	CM	(England)	Kingston upon Thames	26	11	0	0	0	Academy	27 January 2017	Trainee	1 July 2020
27	Neşet Bellikli	LW	(Turkey)	Sutton	27	0	0	0	0	Academy	16 May 2016	Trainee	1 July 2018
28	Alfie Egan	AM	(England)	Lambeth	28	14	0	0	0	Academy	5 February 2016	Trainee	1 July 2018
Forwards
9	Kwesi Appiah	CF	(Ghana)	Thamesmead	35	19	5	6	1	Crystal Palace	31 May 2017	Free	1 July 2019
10	Cody McDonald	CF	(England)	Witham	39	32	5	0	0	Gillingham	22 June 2017	Free	1 July 2019
21	Egli Kaja	CF	(Albania)	Kosovo	28	21	0	0	0	Academy	17 April 2015	Trainee	1 July 2018
29	Jayden Antwi	CF	(England)	Lambeth		1	0	0	0	Academy	28 March 2017	Trainee	1 July 2019
33	Lyle Taylor	CF	(Montserrat)	Greenwich	36	129	44	2	1	Scunthorpe United	14 July 2015	Undisclosed	1 July 2018
39	Joe Pigott	CF	(England)	Maidstone	32	16	5	0	0	Maidstone United	15 January 2018	Undisclosed	1 July 2019

== Player statistics ==
As of 6 February 2018

No.	Pos	Nat	Player	Total		League One		FA Cup		League Cup		League Trophy	
No.	Pos	Nat	Player	Apps	Goals	Apps	Goals	Apps	Goals	Apps	Goals	Apps	Goals
1	GK	(England) ENG	George Long	47	0	43	0	3	0	1	0	0	0
2	DF	(England) ENG	Barry Fuller (Captain)	45	0	41	0	3	0	1	0	0	0
3	DF	(Wales) WAL	Jonathan Meades	16	0	7+6	0	2+1	0	0	0	0	0
4	DF	(Nigeria) NGA	Deji Oshilaja	30	1	25+1	1	2	0	0+1	0	1	0
5	DF	(England) ENG	Will Nightingale	16	0	9+4	0	0	0	1	0	2	0
6	DF	(England) ENG	Paul Robinson	16	1	9+3	0	0+1	0	1	1	2	0
7	MF	(England) ENG	George Francomb	31	0	23+3	0	1+1	0	1	0	1+1	0
8	MF	(Comoros) COM	Jimmy Abdou	24	2	15+5	2	2+1	0	0	0	1	0
9	FW	(Ghana) GHA	Kwesi Appiah	12	2	7+3	2	0	0	0+1	0	1	0
10	FW	(England) ENG	Cody McDonald	35	7	21+7	5	2+1	1	1	0	3	1
11	MF	(England) ENG	Harry Forrester	27	3	9+12	3	2+1	0	0	0	3	0
14	MF	(England) ENG	Liam Trotter	31	2	27+1	2	2	0	0	0	0+1	0
17	MF	(England) ENG	Andy Barcham	33	4	29	4	3	0	1	0	0	0
18	MF	(England) ENG	Dean Parrett	11	2	8+2	0	0	1	0	0	0+1	1
19	MF	(England) ENG	Tom Soares	23	0	19	0	3	0	0	0	1	0
20	DF	(England) ENG	Toby Sibbick	4	2	0+1	0	0	0	0	0	3	2
21	FW	(Albania) ALB	Egli Kaja	13	2	2+7	0	0	0	0+1	0	3	2
23	DF	(England) ENG	Callum Kennedy	12	0	6+1	0	1+1	0	1	0	2	0
24	GK	(England) ENG	Joe McDonnell	4	0	1	0	0	0	0	0	3	0
25	GK	(New Zealand) NZL	Nik Tzanev	0	0	0	0	0	0	0	0	0	0
26	MF	(England) ENG	Anthony Hartigan	15	1	6+5	0	0+1	0	1	0	2	1
27	MF	(Turkey) TUR	Neşet Bellikli	1	0	0	0	0	0	0	0	0+1	0
28	MF	(England) ENG	Alfie Egan	4	0	0+1	0	0	0	0+1	0	2	0
29	FW	(England) ENG	Jayden Antwi	0	0	0	0	0	0	0	0	0	0
30	DF	(England) ENG	Paul Kalambayi	2	0	0	0	0	0	0	0	1+1	0
31	DF	(England) ENG	Seth Owens	0	0	0	0	0	0	0	0	0	0
32	DF	(England) ENG	Darius Charles	25	0	17+4	0	3	0	0	0	1	0
33	FW	(Montserrat) MSR	Lyle Taylor	35	11	25+4	8	3	3	1	0	1+1	0
35	FW	(England) ENG	Great Evans	1	0	0	0	0	0	0	0	0+1	0
36	MF	(England) ENG	Ossama Ashley	1	0	0	0	0	0	0	0	0+1	0
38	MF	(England) ENG	Ethan Nelson-Roberts	1	0	0	0	0	0	0	0	0+1	0
39	FW	(England) ENG	Joe Pigott	4	1	1+3	1	0	0	0	0	0	0
Players who featured on loan for AFC Wimbledon but subsequently returned to their parent club:
Players who left or were released by AFC Wimbledon during the course of the season:

=== Top scorers ===
Rank	Position	Nation	Number	Player	League One	FA Cup	League Cup	League Trophy	Total
1	FW	(Montserrat)	33	Lyle Taylor	8	3	0	0	11
2	FW	(England)	10	Cody McDonald	5	1	0	1	7
3	MF	(England)	17	Andy Barcham	4	0	0	0	4
4	MF	(England)	11	Harry Forrester	3	0	0	0	3
=	MF	(England)	14	Liam Trotter	3	0	0	0	3
5	MF	(Comoros)	8	Jimmy Abdou	2	0	0	0	2
=	FW	(Ghana)	9	Kwesi Appiah	2	0	0	0	2
=	DF	(England)	20	Toby Sibbick	0	0	0	2	2
=	FW	(Albania)	21	Egli Kaja	0	0	0	2	2
6	MF	(England)	19	Tom Soares	1	0	0	0	1
=	FW	(England)	39	Joe Pigott	1	0	0	0	1
=	DF	(England)	6	Paul Robinson	0	0	1	0	1
=	MF	(England)	18	Dean Parrett	0	0	0	1	1
=	MF	(England)	26	Anthony Hartigan	0	0	0	1	1
=	N/A	N/A	N/A	Own goal	0	0	0	1	1
TOTALS					29	4	1	8	42

=== Disciplinary record ===
Number	Position	Nation	Name	League One		FA Cup		League Cup		League Trophy		Total	
Number	Position	Nation	Name	Booked	Sent off (straight red)	Booked	Sent off (straight red)	Booked	Sent off (straight red)	Booked	Sent off (straight red)	Booked	Sent off (straight red)
1	GK	(England)	George Long	3	0	0	0	0	0	0	0	3	0
2	DF	(England)	Barry Fuller	5	0	0	0	1	0	0	0	5	0
4	DF	(Nigeria)	Deji Oshilaja	4	0	0	0	1	0	0	0	5	0
5	DF	(England)	Will Nightingale	2	0	0	0	0	0	0	0	2	0
6	DF	(England)	Paul Robinson	3	0	0	0	0	0	0	0	3	0
7	MF	(England)	George Francomb	5	0	0	0	0	0	0	0	5	0
8	MF	(Comoros)	Jimmy Abdou	4	1	0	0	0	0	0	0	4	1
10	FW	(England)	Cody McDonald	2	0	0	0	0	0	0	0	2	0
11	MF	(England)	Harry Forrester	4	1	0	0	0	0	0	0	4	1
14	MF	(England)	Liam Trotter	4	0	0	0	0	0	0	0	4	0
17	MF	(England)	Andy Barcham	3	0	0	0	0	0	0	0	3	0
19	MF	(England)	Tom Soares	5	0	0	0	0	0	0	0	5	0
26	MF	(England)	Anthony Hartigan	1	0	0	0	0	0	0	0	1	0
32	DF	(England)	Darius Charles	2	0	0	0	0	0	0	0	2	0
33	FW	(Montserrat)	Lyle Taylor	2	0	0	0	0	0	0	0	2	0
39	FW	(England)	Joe Pigott	1	0	0	0	0	0	0	0	1	0
			TOTALS	50	2	0	0	1	0	0	0	51	2

== Transfers ==
Players Transferred In
Date	Position	Nation	Name	Previous club	Fee	Ref.
8 May 2017	GK	(New Zealand)	Nik Tzanev	Brentford	Free	
31 May 2017	FW	(Ghana)	Kwesi Appiah	Crystal Palace	Free	
8 June 2017	DF	(Nigeria)	Deji Oshilaja	Cardiff City	Free	
22 June 2017	FW	(England)	Cody McDonald	Gillingham	Free	
7 July 2017	DF	(England)	Callum Kennedy	Leyton Orient	Free	
21 July 2017	MF	(England)	Liam Trotter	Bolton Wanderers	Free	
10 November 2017	MF	(England)	Richard Pingling	Burnley	Free	
15 January 2018	FW	(England)	Joe Pigott	Maidstone United	Free	
22 March 2018	FW	(Ghana)	Lloyd Sam	D.C. United	Free	
Players Loaned In
Date from	Position	Nation	Name	From	Date to	Ref.
4 July 2017	GK	(England)	George Long	Sheffield United	1 July 2018	
15 July 2017	MF	(Comoros)	Jimmy Abdou	Millwall	1 July 2018	
23 August 2017	MF	(England)	Harry Forrester	Rangers	1 July 2018	
Players Loaned Out
Date from	Position	Nation	Name	To	Date to	Ref.
19 August 2017	DF	(England)	Seth Owens	Whitehawk	19 September 2017	
9 November 2017	MF	(England)	Alfie Egan	Sutton United	27 January 2018	
Players Transferred Out
Date	Position	Nation	Name	Subsequent club	Fee	Ref
2 May 2017	MF	(England)	Tom Beere	Hampton & Richmond Borough	Released	
2 May 2017	MF	(England)	Dannie Bulman	Crawley Town	Released	
2 May 2017	MF	(England)	David Fitzpatrick	Barrow	Released	
2 May 2017	MF	(England)	Dan Gallagher	Leatherhead	Released	
2 May 2017	FW	(England)	George Oakley	Inverness Caledonian Thistle	Released	
2 May 2017	DF	(Scotland)	Chris Robertson	Swindon Town	Released	
2 May 2017	GK	(England)	James Shea	Luton Town	Released	
9 June 2017	FW	(England)	Tom Elliott	Millwall	Free	
10 June 2017	DF	(Scotland)	Sean Kelly	Ross County	Free	
27 June 2017	GK	(England)	Joe Bursík	Stoke City	Undisclosed	
28 June 2017	FW	(England)	Dominic Poleon	Bradford City	Undisclosed	
4 July 2017	MF	(England)	Jake Reeves	Bradford City	Undisclosed	
6 July 2017	FW	(England)	Tyrone Barnett	Port Vale	Free	
28 July 2017	MF	(England)	Chris Whelpdale	Stevenage	Free	
