= Joe Pigott =

English footballer (born 1993)

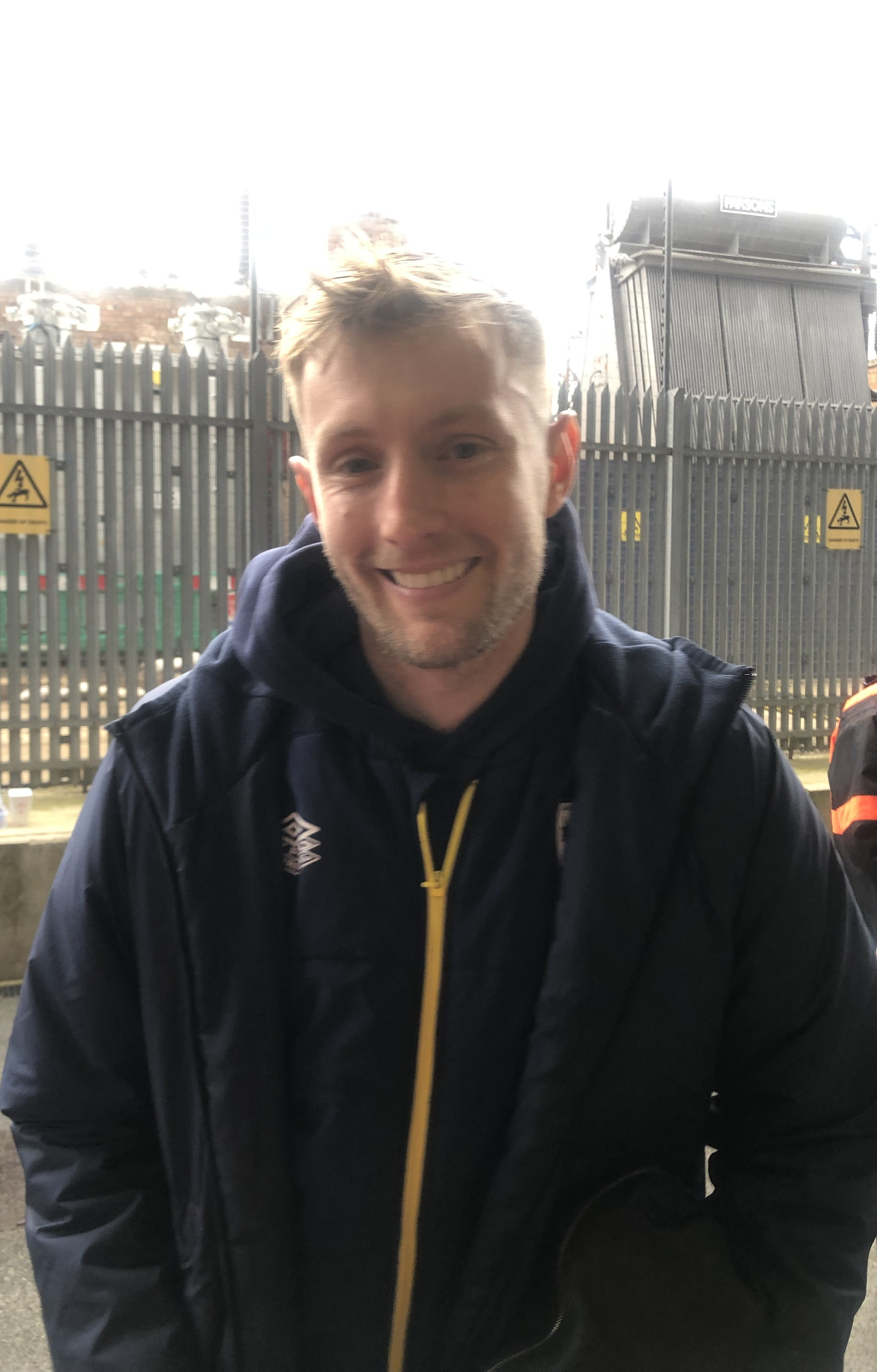
- Pigott in 2025

Personal information
- Full name: Joseph David Wozencroft Pigott
- Date of birth: 24 November 1993 (age 32)
- Place of birth: Maidstone, Kent, England
- Height: 6 ft 0 in (1.83 m)
- Position: Striker

Team information
- Current team: Folkestone Invicta
- Number: 39

Youth career
- –2012: Charlton Athletic

Senior career*
Years	Team	Apps	(Gls)
2012–2016	Charlton Athletic	12	(0)
2012–2013	→ Bromley (loan)	5	(3)
2014	→ Gillingham (loan)	7	(1)
2014	→ Newport County (loan)	10	(3)
2015	→ Southend United (loan)	20	(6)
2015–2016	→ Southend United (loan)	23	(3)
2016	→ Luton Town (loan)	15	(4)
2016–2017	Cambridge United	10	(0)
2017	→ Maidstone United (loan)	17	(6)
2017–2018	Maidstone United	28	(11)
2018–2021	AFC Wimbledon	137	(47)
2021–2023	Ipswich Town	22	(2)
2022–2023	→ Portsmouth (loan)	35	(4)
2023–2025	Leyton Orient	36	(2)
2024–2025	→ AFC Wimbledon (loan)	28	(2)
2025–	Folkestone Invicta	42	(19)
- * Club domestic league appearances and goals as of 17:10, 25 October 2026 (UTC)

Joseph David Wozencroft Pigott (born 24 November 1993) is an English professional footballer who plays as a striker for Folkestone Invicta.

Pigott began his career with Charlton Athletic, signing his first professional contract in January 2012. He played only 16 games for Charlton in four and a half seasons, and was loaned out to a number of lower-level clubs. In 2016 he was released by Charlton and joined Cambridge United of EFL League Two. After a loan spell with non-League club Maidstone United, he signed for the team on a permanent basis in 2017. In January 2018, he returned to the English Football League when he was signed by AFC Wimbledon of EFL League One, and he went on to play more than 150 games for the team and was the first player to score a goal at their new Plough Lane stadium. In 2021 he moved to another League One club, Ipswich Town, but after one season as a semi-regular in the team he was loaned out once again, this time to Portsmouth. He subsequently moved to Leyton Orient, and in 2024 was sent on a season-long loan to his former club, AFC Wimbledon.

== Career ==
=== Charlton Athletic ===
Born in Maidstone, Kent, Pigott began his career with Charlton Athletic and was offered a professional contract in January 2012. He made his professional debut on 6 August 2013 in a 4–0 victory over Oxford United in the League Cup, scoring Charlton's fourth goal from the penalty spot, and made his Football League debut as a 90th-minute substitute for Simon Church in a 2–1 win at home to Leicester City on 31 August. Pigott was rewarded three days later with a new three-year contract. On 30 January 2014, Pigott joined League One club Gillingham on a one-month loan. He debuted two days later as a 70th-minute substitute in a 3–2 victory at home to Port Vale. On his first start, Pigott scored his first goal for Gillingham with the opener in a 2–1 win away to Carlisle United on 8 February. His loan was extended by a further month on 27 February, but was later recalled by manager José Riga on 24 March, having scored one goal from seven appearances for Gillingham. Pigott's first appearance for Charlton following his return came as a 58th-minute substitute in a 3–0 defeat away to Derby County on 29 March and finished 2013–14 with 14 appearances and one goal for the club.

On 11 September 2014, Pigott joined League Two club Newport County on loan until mid-November. He debuted two days later in a 3–2 victory at home to Northampton Town and scored his first two goals in a 4–1 win at home to AFC Wimbledon on 27 September. Pigott scored an equaliser from 30 yards into the top corner in a 1–1 draw at home to Accrington Stanley on 25 October, having entered the match as a 62nd-minute substitute. Newport manager Justin Edinburgh confirmed that Pigott would return to Charlton following the expiration of his loan spell as the club "couldn't afford to keep him". He made his final appearance for Newport in a 2–2 draw at home to Exeter City on 16 November, finishing the loan spell with three goals from 11 appearances. Upon his return to Charlton, Pigott made his first appearance of 2014–15 for the club as a half-time substitute in a 2–0 defeat away to Blackburn Rovers on 20 December. He was introduced as an 89th-minute substitute against the same club on 3 January 2015 in the FA Cup, which finished as a 2–1 defeat.

On 9 January 2015, Pigott was loaned to League Two club Southend United, initially for one month. He debuted a day later in a 0–0 draw at home to Plymouth Argyle and scored his first goal the following week in a 3–2 win away to Oxford United. This was followed up with a goal in the following match, a 2–1 win away to Portsmouth. Pigott's loan at Southend was extended until the end of the season on 30 January, before scoring twice in Southend's 2–0 victory at home to Cheltenham Town on 10 February. He was introduced as a 60th-minute substitute in the 2015 League Two play-off final at Wembley Stadium on 23 May 2015, in which he scored a goal in stoppage time of extra time against Wycombe Wanderers to take the match to a penalty shoot-out. Pigott scored Southend's first penalty in the 7–6 shoot-out victory, which saw the team win promotion to League One. He completed the loan spell with seven goals from 23 appearances.

On 8 August 2015, Pigott returned to Southend on a five-month loan with a view to a permanent transfer. He made his first appearance following his return later that day in a 1–1 draw away to Fleetwood Town on the opening day of 2015–16. Pigott scored his first two goals of the season in a 2–1 win away to Crewe Alexandra on 29 September. This marked the start of a run of five goals from four matches, which saw him nominated for the PFA League One Player of the Month award for October. Southend opted not to sign Pigott permanently and he returned to Charlton in January 2016, having scored five goals from 28 appearances. Pigott was loaned out again on 28 January 2016, joining League Two club Luton Town until the end of 2015–16, linking back up with Luton manager Nathan Jones who had previously been his youth coach at Charlton. He scored his first two goals in a 3–2 win away to Oxford United on 16 April, which saw him earn a place in the Football League Team of the Week. Pigott went on to score a day later in a 2–1 win away to Carlisle United and completed the loan spell with four goals from 15 appearances. Upon his return to Charlton, the club announced that he would be released following the expiration of his contract.

=== Cambridge United ===
On 8 July 2016, Pigott signed for League Two club Cambridge United on a one-year contract. He debuted on the opening day of 2016–17 in a 1–1 draw at home to Barnet and scored his first goal in a 1–0 win away to Shrewsbury Town in the EFL Trophy on 30 August. However, Pigott struggled to force his way into the first team and was loaned to National League club Maidstone United on 27 January 2017 until the end of 2016–17. He debuted a day later as a 54th-minute substitute in a 2–0 defeat away to Solihull Moors and scored his first goal in a 4–2 victory at home to Chester on 18 February. Pigott completed the loan spell with 17 appearances and six goals. He was one of six players released by Cambridge when his contract expired at the end of 2016–17.

=== Maidstone United ===
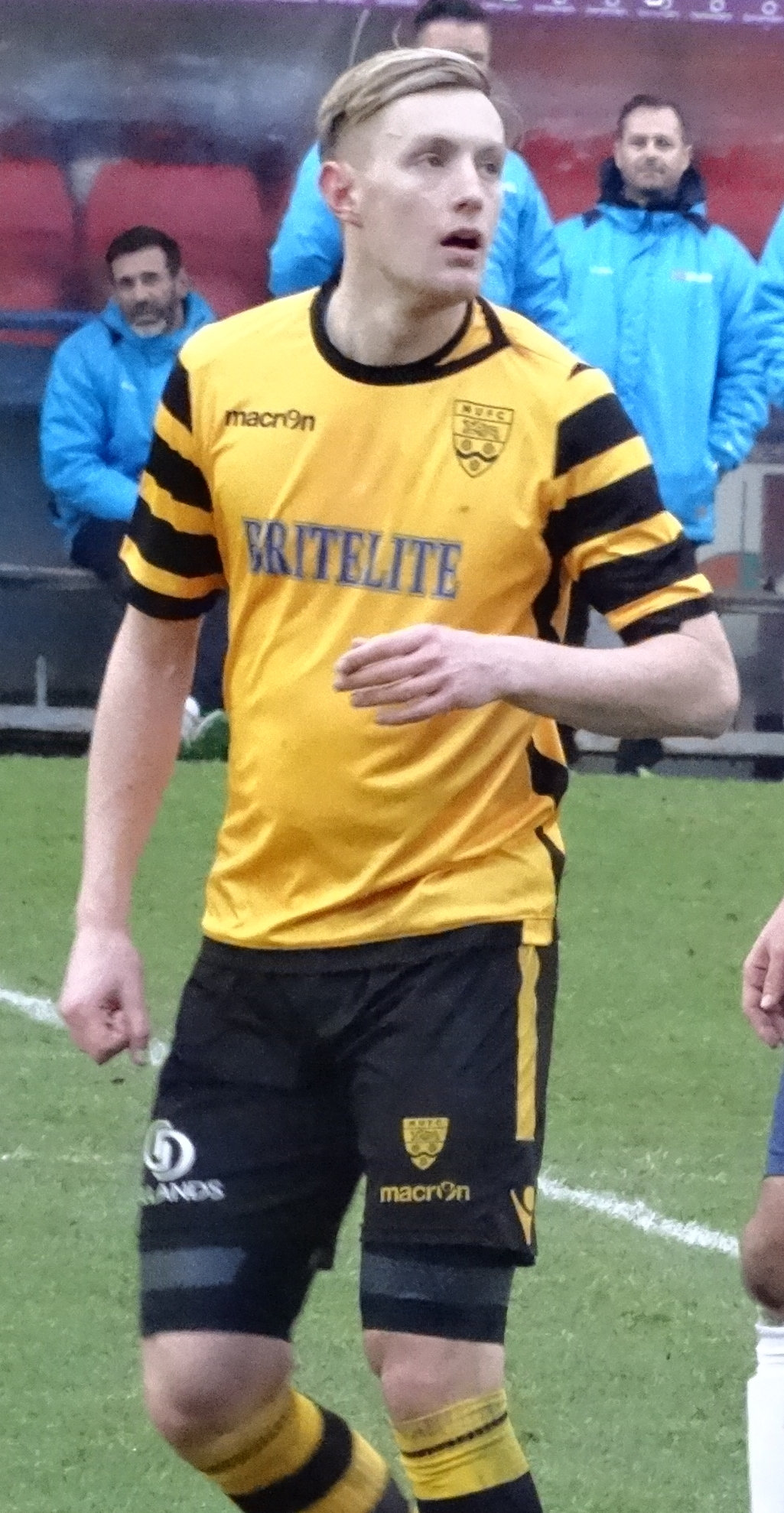
Pigott playing for Maidstone United in 2017

On 31 May 2017, Pigott joined Maidstone United permanently on a one-year contract.

=== AFC Wimbledon ===
On 15 January 2018, Pigott signed for League One club AFC Wimbledon on a contract of undisclosed length for an undisclosed fee. He scored four minutes into his AFC Wimbledon debut in a 2–0 victory at home to Blackpool five days later, having entered the match as a 73rd-minute substitute. On 28 August, Pigott scored after 77 seconds in Wimbledon's EFL Cup match against Premier League club West Ham United, but was substituted after Rod McDonald was sent off later in the first half; the Dons went on to lose 3–1. He made history as the first player to score a goal at the new Plough Lane stadium on 3 November 2020 against Doncaster Rovers; he also scored Wimbledon's second in the eventual 2–2 draw. Pigott said that it had been the "toughest decision" of his career after he decided not to sign a new contract with Wimbledon at the end of the 2020–21 season.

=== Ipswich Town ===
On 12 July 2021, Pigott joined Ipswich Town on a free transfer. He signed a three-year contract with the club. After making his debut for Ipswich on the opening day of the 2021–22 season against Morecambe, he scored his first goal for the club in the following match against Burton Albion on 14 August, a goal that was initially ruled as a Thomas O'Connor own goal, but was later awarded to Pigott following a review by the Dubious Goal Panel.

In July 2022 he joined Portsmouth on loan. He scored his first goal for Portsmouth in an EFL Cup win over Cardiff City on 9 August 2022.

=== Leyton Orient ===
On 21 July 2023, Pigott joined Leyton Orient on a two-year deal. | On 11 July 2024, Pigott returned to League Two side AFC Wimbledon on a season-long loan deal.

On 2 June 2025, Orient said the player would be leaving when his contract expired.

=== Folkestone Invicta ===
On 5 September 2025, Pigott joined Isthmian League Premier Division club Folkestone Invicta, reuniting with his former Maidstone United manager Jay Saunders.

He scored 15 goals in his first season with Folkestone Invicta, helping the club win promotion to the National League South as champions.

== Career statistics ==
As of match played 24 October 2026

Appearances and goals by club, season and competition
Club	Season	League			FA Cup		League Cup		Other		Total	
Club	Season	Division	Apps	Goals	Apps	Goals	Apps	Goals	Apps	Goals	Apps	Goals
Charlton Athletic	2011–12	League One	0	0	0	0	0	0	0	0	0	0
Charlton Athletic	2012–13	Championship	0	0	0	0	0	0	—		0	0
Charlton Athletic	2013–14	Championship	11	0	1	0	2	1	—		14	1
Charlton Athletic	2014–15	Championship	1	0	1	0	0	0	—		2	0
Charlton Athletic	2015–16	Championship	0	0	—		—		—		0	0
Charlton Athletic	Total		12	0	2	0	2	1	0	0	16	1
Bromley (loan)	2012–13	Conference South	5	3	—		—		3 (Note: Appearances in FA Trophy)	1	8	4
Gillingham (loan)	2013–14	League One	7	1	—		—		—		7	1
Newport County (loan)	2014–15	League Two	10	3	—		—		1 (Note: Appearance(s) in Football League Trophy)	0	11	3
Southend United (loan)	2014–15	League Two	20	6	—		—		3 (Note: Appearances in League Two play-offs)	1	23	7
Southend United (loan)	2015–16	League One	23	3	1	0	1	0	3	2	28	5
Southend United (loan)	Total		43	9	1	0	1	0	6	3	51	12
Luton Town (loan)	2015–16	League Two	15	4	—		—		—		15	4
Cambridge United	2016–17	League Two	10	0	2	0	2	0	3 (Note: Appearance(s) in EFL Trophy)	1	17	1
Maidstone United (loan)	2016–17	National League	17	6	—		—		—		17	6
Maidstone United	2017–18	National League	28	11	4	2	—		2	1	34	14
Maidstone United	Total		45	17	4	2	—		2	1	51	20
AFC Wimbledon	2017–18	League One	18	5	—		—		—		18	5
AFC Wimbledon	2018–19	League One	40	15	3	1	2	2	3	0	48	18
AFC Wimbledon	2019–20	League One	34	7	2	1	1	0	2	1	39	9
AFC Wimbledon	2020–21	League One	45	20	2	1	1	0	4	1	52	22
AFC Wimbledon	Total		137	47	7	3	4	2	9	2	157	54
Ipswich Town	2021–22	League One	22	2	3	0	0	0	4	1	29	3
Ipswich Town	2022–23	League One	0	0	0	0	0	0	0	0	0	0
Ipswich Town	Total		22	2	3	0	0	0	4	1	29	3
Portsmouth (loan)	2022–23	League One	35	4	2	1	2	1	5	1	44	7
Leyton Orient	2023–24	League One	36	2	2	1	1	0	3	1	42	4
Leyton Orient	2024–25	League One	0	0	0	0	0	0	0	0	0	0
Leyton Orient	Total		36	2	2	1	1	0	3	1	42	4
AFC Wimbledon (loan)	2024–25	League Two	28	2	2	0	3	1	4	1	37	4
Folkestone Invicta	2025–26	Isthmian League Premier Division	31	15	3	1	—		2	1	36	17
Folkestone Invicta	2026–27	National League South	11	4	1	0	—		0	0	12	4
Folkestone Invicta	Total		42	19	4	1	0	0	2	1	48	21
Career total			447	113	29	8	15	5	42	13	533	139

== Honours ==
Southend United

- Football League Two play-offs: 2015

AFC Wimbledon

- EFL League Two play-offs: 2025

Folkestone Invicta

- Isthmian League Premier League: 2025–26

Individual

- EFL League One Player of the Month: April 2019
- AFC Wimbledon Player of the Year: 2020–21
