= Seth Owens =

English footballer

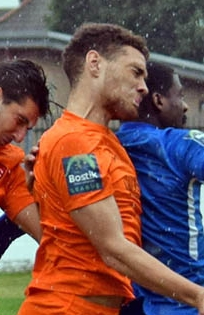
- Owens playing for Maldon & Tiptree in 2018.

Personal information
- Full name: Seth Owens
- Date of birth: 6 November 1998 (age 28)
- Place of birth: Hackney, England
- Height: 1.78 m (5 ft 10 in)
- Position: Defender

Youth career
- –2010: Wingate & Finchley
- 2010–2016: Brentford

Senior career*
Years	Team	Apps	(Gls)
2015–2016	Brentford	0	(0)
2015–2016	→ Hayes & Yeading United (loan)	2	(0)
2016–2018	AFC Wimbledon	3	(0)
2017	→ Whitehawk (loan)	1	(0)
2018	Maldon & Tiptree	6	(0)
2018	Staines Town	1	(0)
2018–2022	Farnborough	66	(8)
2022	→ Leatherhead (dual-reg)	6	(0)
2022	Burnham	2	(0)
2022	South Park	2	(0)
2024	Saffron Walden Town	0	(0)
- * Club domestic league appearances and goals as of 14:43, 24 October 2024 (UTC)

Seth Owens (born 11 November 1998) is an English semi-professional footballer who plays as a defender. He is a product of the Brentford academy and began his professional career with AFC Wimbledon in 2016. After his release in 2018, Owens dropped into non-League football.

== Club career ==
=== Brentford ===
Adept at left back or centre back, Owens began his career with Wingate & Finchley, before joining the academy at Brentford and signing a scholarship deal at the end of the 2013–14 season. He made 43 appearances and scored four goals for the youth team and had a one-month work experience loan at Hayes & Yeading United prior to his release in January 2016.

=== AFC Wimbledon ===
Owens joined the Development Squad at League One club AFC Wimbledon on trial during the 2016–17 pre-season and impressed enough to sign his first professional contract on 9 August 2016. He won his maiden call into the first team squad two months later, for a league match versus Bury on 18 October 2016 and remained an unused substitute during the 2–1 victory. He made his debut with a start in a 2–0 EFL Trophy group stage loss against Newport County on 8 November 2016 and made his league debut versus Bury on 19 November, playing the full 90 minutes of the 5–1 victory. He finished the 2016–17 season with six appearances and was nominated for the club's Young Player of the Year award.

Early in the 2017–18 season, Owens joined National League South club Whitehawk on loan. He made his only appearance for the club with a start in a 1–0 defeat to Concord Rangers on 19 August 2017. Owens' loan was terminated after he sustained a knee injury in training in the days leading up to the Hawks' match with Braintree Town on 26 August. The injury ruled Owens out for the majority of the 2017–18 season. He returned to match play with the Development Squad in mid-April 2018 and was released at the end of the 2017–18 season.

=== Non-League football ===
Prior to the beginning of the 2018–19 season, Owens dropped into non-League football to join Isthmian League North Division club Maldon & Tiptree. After seven appearances, he transferred to Southern League Premier Division South club Staines Town. After just two appearances for Staines Town, Owens moved across the division to Farnborough in late-December 2018. He played through until January 2022, when he joined Isthmian League Premier Division club Leatherhead on dual-registration terms. He ended the 2021–22 season with Combined Counties League Premier Division North club Burnham. In September 2022, Owens transferred to Isthmian League South Central Division club South Park. He made five appearances and did not appear past 14 November 2022. On 3 August 2024, Owens made an appearance for Essex Senior League club Saffron Walden Town.

== Career statistics ==
As of match played 10 August 2024

Appearances and goals by club, season and competition
Club	Season	League			FA Cup		League Cup		Other		Total	
Club	Season	Division	Apps	Goals	Apps	Goals	Apps	Goals	Apps	Goals	Apps	Goals
Hayes & Yeading United (loan)	2015–16	National League South	2	0	—		—		—		2	0
AFC Wimbledon	2016–17	League One	3	0	1	0	0	0	2 (Note: Appearances in EFL Trophy)	0	6	0
Whitehawk (loan)	2017–18	National League South	1	0	—		—		—		1	0
Maldon & Tiptree	2018–19	Isthmian League North Division	6	0	0	0	—		1 (Note: Appearance in Isthmian League Cup)	0	7	0
Staines Town	2018–19	Southern League Premier Division South	1	0	—		—		1 (Note: Appearance in FA Trophy)	0	2	0
Farnborough	2018–19	Southern League Premier Division South	19	2	—		—		—		19	2
Farnborough	2019–20	Southern League Premier Division South	24	2	2	0	—		2 (Note: 1 appearance in FA Trophy, 1 appearance in Hampshire Senior Cup)	0	28	2
Farnborough	2020–21	Southern League Premier Division South	7	1	3	0	—		1	0	11	1
Farnborough	2021–22	Southern League Premier Division South	16	3	2	0	—		5 (Note: 3 appearances in FA Trophy, 2 appearances in Hampshire Senior Cup)	0	23	3
Farnborough	Total		66	8	7	0	—		8	0	81	8
Leatherhead (dual-registration)	2021–22	Isthmian League Premier Division	6	0	—		—		—		6	0
Burnham	2021–22	Combined Counties League Premier Division North	2	0	—		—		—		2	0
South Park	2022–23	Isthmian League South Central Division	2	0	—		—		3 (Note: 2 appearances in Isthmian League Cup, 1 appearance in FA Trophy)	0	5	0
Saffron Walden Town	2024–25	Essex Senior League	0	0	1	0	—		0	0	1	0
Career total			89	8	9	0	0	0	15	0	113	8
