= Deji Oshilaja =

English footballer (born 1993)

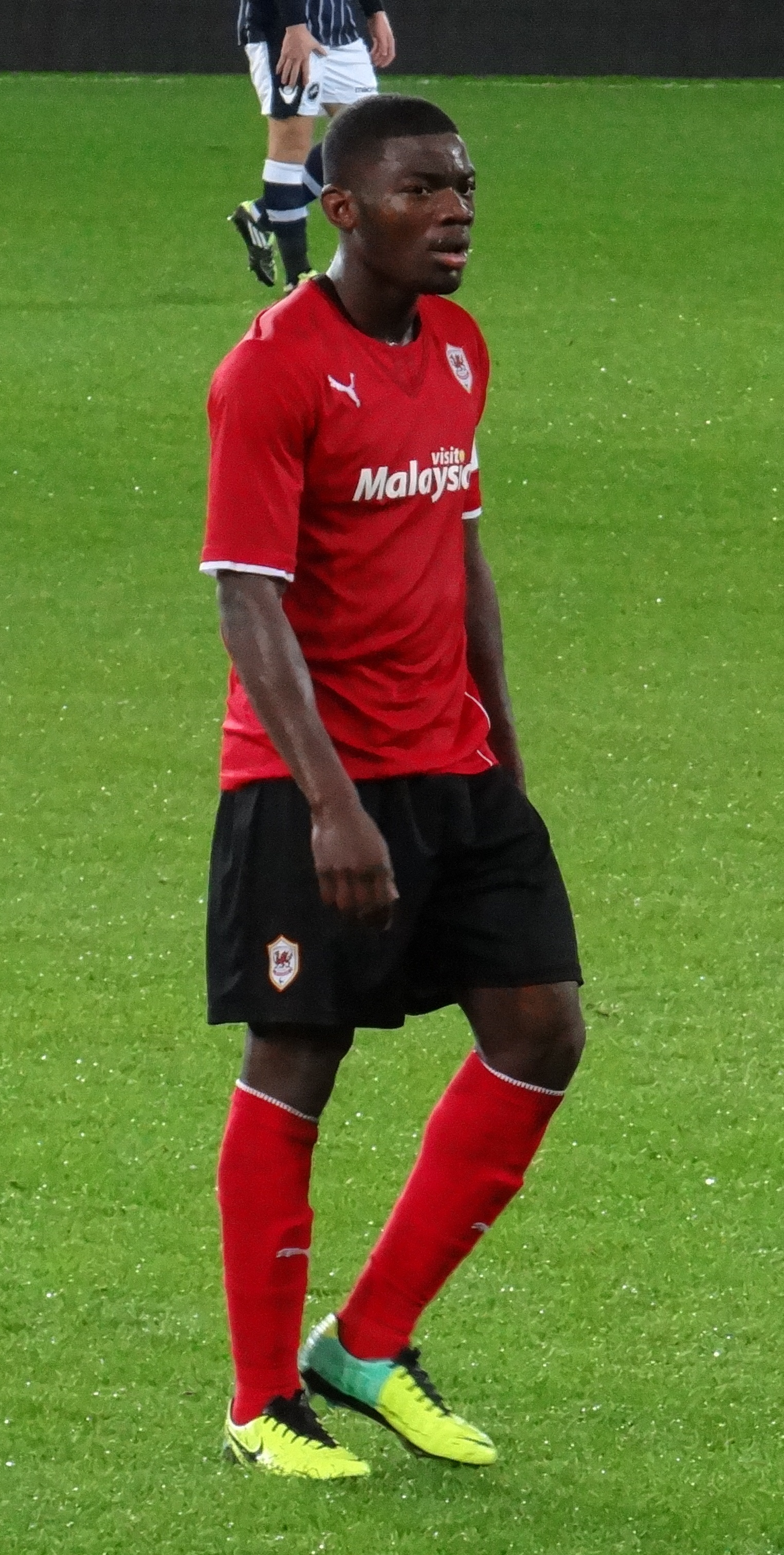
- Oshilaja playing for Cardiff City in 2013

Personal information
- Full name: Abdul-Yussuf Adedeji Adeniyi Oshilaja
- Date of birth: 2 March 1993 (age 33)
- Place of birth: Bermondsey, England
- Height: 1.81 m (5 ft 11 in)
- Position: Defender

Team information
- Current team: Mansfield Town
- Number: 23

Youth career
- 2009–2012: Cardiff City

Senior career*
Years	Team	Apps	(Gls)
2012–2017	Cardiff City	0	(0)
2013–2014	→ Newport County (loan)	8	(0)
2014	→ Sheffield Wednesday (loan)	2	(0)
2015	→ AFC Wimbledon (loan)	23	(1)
2015–2016	→ Gillingham (loan)	12	(3)
2016	→ Gillingham (loan)	10	(0)
2016–2017	→ Gillingham (loan)	33	(2)
2017–2019	AFC Wimbledon	67	(3)
2019–2021	Charlton Athletic	42	(1)
2021–2024	Burton Albion	115	(5)
2024–	Mansfield Town	75	(3)
- * Club domestic league appearances and goals as of 17:10, 22 August 2026 (UTC)

Abdul-Yussuf Adedeji Adeniyi "Deji" Oshilaja (born 2 March 1993) is an English professional footballer who plays as a defender for EFL League One club Mansfield Town.

== Career ==
=== Cardiff City ===
Born in Bermondsey, Oshilaja joined Cardiff City as a 16-year-old, progressing through the academy to sign his first professional contract in April 2012. His professional debut for Cardiff came on 14 August 2012, in a 2–1 defeat to Northampton Town in the Football League Cup. Oshilaja made his second appearance in another cup game in the new year, which also resulted in a 2–1 loss against Macclesfield Town. Despite this, manager Malky Mackay praised Oshilaja's performance, describing it as "great courage". At the end of the season, Oshilaja was offered a new contract by the club.

On 31 October 2013, Oshilaja joined Newport County on a one-month loan. He made his Football League début for Newport on 2 November 2013 versus Fleetwood Town. He scored his first goal for Newport in the 3–0 win versus Portsmouth in the Football League Trophy match on 12 November 2013. His loan spell at Newport was extended and he returned to Cardiff City in January 2014, which he made eight appearances for the club.

On 7 February 2014, Oshilaja was loaned to Sheffield Wednesday until 12 March. He then made his Sheffield Wednesday debut on 11 February 2014, playing as a centre-back, in a 3–0 loss against Wigan Athletic. His second appearance came on 12 March 2014, also came against Wigan, which Sheffield Wednesday lost 1–0 for the second time in the 2013–14 season. Oshilaja loan spell with Sheffield Wednesday was extended until the end of the season. However, Oshilaja never made another appearance for the club and returned to Cardiff City.

On 8 January 2015, Oshilaja was loaned to AFC Wimbledon until the end of the season. Oshilaja made his Wimbledon debut three days later, on 11 January 2015, in a 2–1 loss against Stevenage. Oshilaja then scored his first goal for the club on 7 March 2015, in a 2–1 win over York City. After making twenty-three appearances for the club, Oshilaja's performance saw him being awarded Natalie Callow Memorial Trophy for AFCW Young Player of the Year. and returned to his parent club on 16 June 2015.

Oshilaja was sent out on a six-month loan to Gillingham on 24 July 2015, where he scored on the opening day of the season, in a 4–0 win against Sheffield United. Three weeks later on 29 August 2015, Oshilaja scored his second goal of the season against Peterborough United. However, Oshilaja suffered a knee injury during the match and was sidelined for two months. After two months on the sidelines, Oshilaja made his return in the first team, in the quarter-final of the Football League Trophy, against Yeovil Town, in which he made his first start. Having formed a strong defensive partnership with John Egan in the first half of the season, Oshilaja was recalled by Cardiff in January. He later returned to the club on 14 March 2016 for a second loan spell until the end of the season. On 6 July 2016 he re-joined Gillingham on a season-long loan.

=== AFC Wimbledon ===
On 8 June 2017, Oshilaja agreed a deal to join AFC Wimbledon on 1 July, following the expiration of his contract with Cardiff. He was named captain for AFC Wimbledon for the 2018–19 season.. In May 2019, Wimbledon released Oshilaja.

=== Charlton Athletic ===
On 22 July 2019, Oshilaja was signed by Charlton Athletic following his release from AFC Wimbledon for free on a two-year deal. He scored his first goal for Charlton in a 2–0 win against Rochdale on 6 February 2021.

On 18 May 2021, it was announced that Oshilaja would leave Charlton Athletic at the end of his contract.

=== Burton Albion ===
On 10 June 2021, Oshilaja signed for Burton Albion. He became a key player for Burton quickly (and eventually the captain) playing 30 league games in the 2021–22 season and over 40 in 2022–23 for the Brewers. Oshilaja renewed his contract in the summer of 2023.

He was released by Burton at the end of the 2023–24 season.

=== Mansfield Town ===
On 17 June 2024, Oshilaja signed for Mansfield Town.

== Personal life ==
Born in England, Oshilaja is of Nigerian descent.

== Career statistics ==
As of 22 August 2026

Appearances and goals by club, season and competition
Club	Season	League			FA Cup		League Cup		Other		Total	
Club	Season	Division	Apps	Goals	Apps	Goals	Apps	Goals	Apps	Goals	Apps	Goals
Cardiff City	2012–13	Championship	0	0	1	0	1	0	0	0	2	0
Cardiff City	2013–14	Premier League	0	0	0	0	0	0	0	0	0	0
Cardiff City	2014–15	Championship	0	0	0	0	1	0	0	0	1	0
Cardiff City	2015–16	Championship	0	0	0	0	0	0	0	0	0	0
Cardiff City	2016–17	Championship	0	0	0	0	0	0	0	0	0	0
Cardiff City	Total		0	0	1	0	2	0	0	0	3	0
Newport County (loan)	2013–14	League Two	8	0	2	0	0	0	2 (Note: Appearance(s) in Football League Trophy)	1	12	1
Sheffield Wednesday (loan)	2013–14	Championship	2	0	0	0	0	0	0	0	2	0
AFC Wimbledon (loan)	2014–15	League Two	23	1	0	0	0	0	0	0	23	1
Gillingham (loan)	2015–16	League One	22	3	0	0	2	0	1	0	25	3
Gillingham (loan)	2016–17	League One	33	2	2	0	3	0	2 (Note: Appearance(s) in EFL Trophy)	0	40	2
Gillingham (loan)	Total		55	5	2	0	5	0	3	0	65	5
AFC Wimbledon	2017–18	League One	42	2	3	0	1	0	2	0	48	2
AFC Wimbledon	2018–19	League One	25	1	4	0	2	0	1	0	32	1
AFC Wimbledon	Total		90	4	7	0	3	0	3	0	103	4
Charlton Athletic	2019–20	Championship	25	0	1	0	1	0	0	0	27	0
Charlton Athletic	2020–21	League One	17	1	0	0	2	0	1	0	20	1
Charlton Athletic	Total		42	1	1	0	3	0	1	0	47	1
Burton Albion	2021–22	League One	30	0	2	0	1	0	0	0	33	0
Burton Albion	2022–23	League One	42	3	3	3	0	0	5	2	50	8
Burton Albion	2023–24	League One	43	2	2	0	1	0	4	2	50	4
Burton Albion	Total		115	5	7	3	2	0	9	4	133	12
Mansfield Town	2024–25	League One	39	3	1	0	1	0	2	0	43	3
Mansfield Town	2025–26	League One	34	0	5	0	0	0	0	0	39	0
Mansfield Town	2026–27	League One	2	0	0	0	1	0	1	0	4	0
Mansfield Town	Total		75	3	6	0	2	0	3	0	86	3
Career total			387	18	26	3	17	0	21	4	451	25

== Honours ==
Individual

- AFC Wimbledon Player of the Year: 2017–18
