= Paul Kalambayi =

English footballer

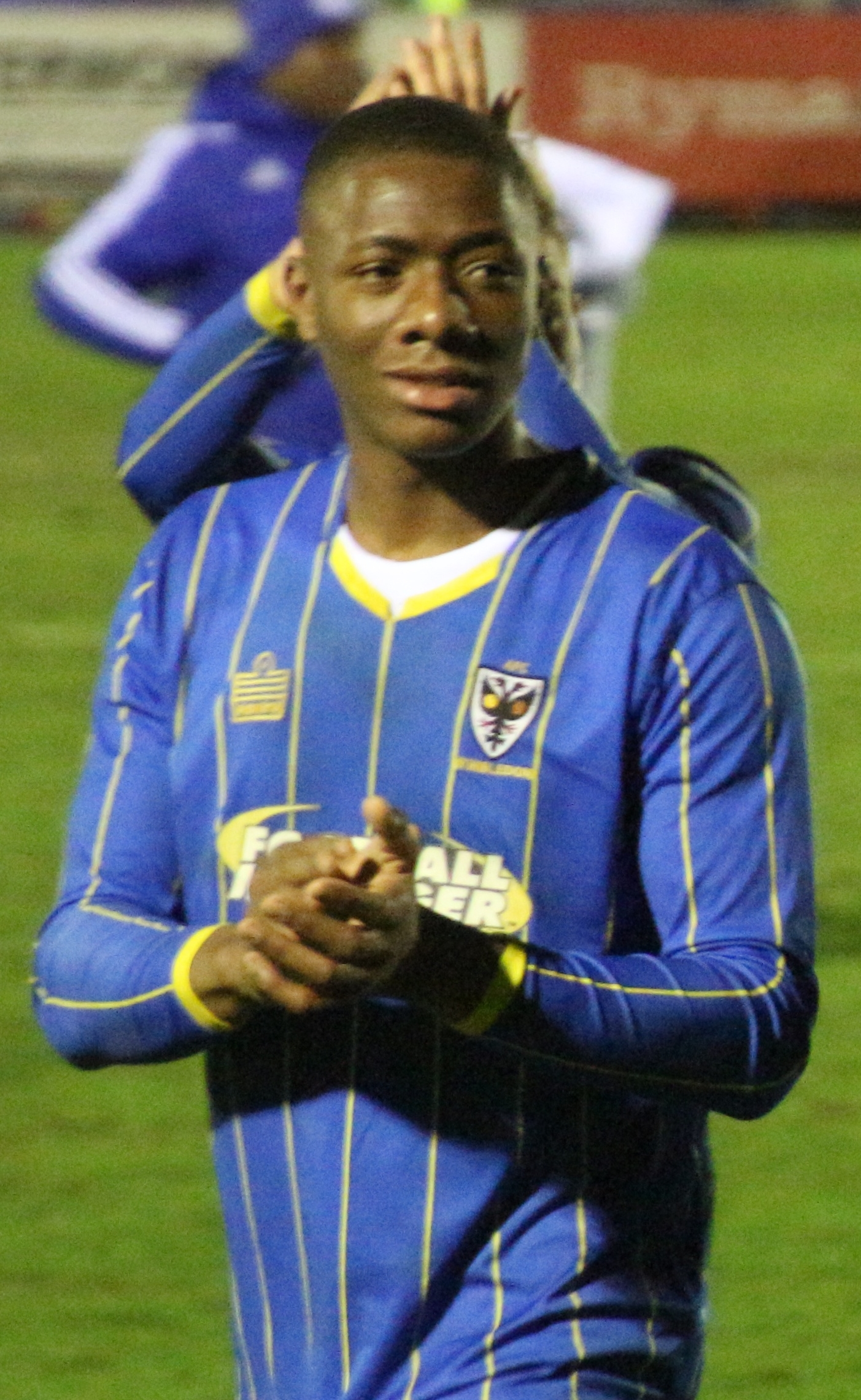
- Kalambayi after an AFC Wimbledon U18 match in 2016.

Personal information
- Full name: Paul Mbwebwe Mbiya-Kalambayi
- Date of birth: 9 July 1999 (age 27)
- Place of birth: Dulwich, England
- Height: 1.83 m (6 ft 0 in)
- Position: Central defender

Team information
- Current team: Barrow
- Number: 25

Youth career
- Dulwich Village
- Evolution Sports & Health Academy
- 2013–2015: Brentford
- 2015–2016: AFC Wimbledon

Senior career*
Years	Team	Apps	(Gls)
2016–2024	AFC Wimbledon	88	(1)
2018	→ Tonbridge Angels (loan)	7	(0)
2024–2026	Dagenham & Redbridge	56	(1)
2025–2026	→ Kidderminster Harriers (loan)	21	(0)
2026–	Barrow	6	(0)
- * Club domestic league appearances and goals as of 12:57, 9 September 2026 (UTC)

Paul Mbwebwe Mbiya-Kalambayi (born 9 July 1999) is an English professional footballer who plays as a central defender for National League club Barrow.

Kalambayi is a product of the Brentford and AFC Wimbledon academies. He made his professional debut for AFC Wimbledon in 2017 and made 117 appearances during seven seasons as a senior player for the club in the English Football League. After his release in 2024, Kalambayi dropped into non-League football.

== Career ==
=== AFC Wimbledon ===
==== Early years (2015–2018) ====
After spells with Dulwich Village, Evolution Sports & Health Academy and Brentford, Kalambayi joined the academy at League Two club AFC Wimbledon in 2015. Despite being age 16, his rate of development saw him feature for the Development Squad before the end of 2015 and he was rewarded his first professional contract in February 2016. During the remainder of the 2015–16 season, Kalambayi was an unused substitute on two occasions with the first team squad. After the Dons' promotion to League One for the 2016–17 season, he was named in the first team squad list and was an unused substitute during two of the season's matches.

Kalambayi received his first call-up of the 2017–18 season as a substitute for an EFL Trophy group stage match versus Barnet and made his senior debut when he replaced Callum Kennedy after 66 minutes of the 4–3 victory. He made one further EFL Trophy appearance during the season and spent a month on loan at Isthmian League Premier Division club Tonbridge Angels.

==== Breakthrough (2018–2020) ====
Kalambayi was named as the Development Squad captain for the 2018–19 season and his EFL debut came with a start in a 2–1 defeat to Portsmouth on New Year's Day 2019. The match kicked off a run of five consecutive starting appearances before manager Wally Downes imposed a rest break on him. Kalambayi made 19 appearances during the 2018–19 season and helped the Dons preserve their League One status on the final day. He signed a new contract in June 2019 and was a near ever-present during the first four months of the 2019–20 season, before rupturing ankle ligaments. He returned to full training in March 2020, but did not appear again during the truncated 2019–20 season.

==== Later years and injuries (2020–2024) ====
Following 19 appearances during 2020–21, quadriceps and medial collateral ligament injuries disrupted Kalambayi's 2021–22 season, restricting him to 16 appearances. He scored his first senior goal of his career in a 5–3 EFL Trophy win over Portsmouth on 7 September 2021 and signed a new 2 1/2-year contract in January 2022. Kalambayi made 32 appearances and scored two goals during the 2022–23 season, before suffering a season-ending knee injury in March 2023. He returned to match play in a behind closed doors friendly on 17 October 2023 and ended the 2023–24 season with seven appearances. After making 117 appearances and scoring three goals during his seven seasons as a senior player with AFC Wimbledon, Kalambayi departed the club when his contract expired at the end of the 2023–24 season.

=== Dagenham & Redbridge ===
On 14 June 2024, Kalambayi signed a two-year contract with National League club Dagenham & Redbridge on a free transfer. He made 48 appearances and scored one goal during a 2024–25 season which culminated in relegation to the National League South. Kalambayi made 17 appearances and scored one goal during a mid-table 2025–26 season, which was bisected by five mid-season months on loan with National League North club Kidderminster Harriers, for whom he made 27 appearances and scored one goal. Kalambayi was released when his contract expired at the end of the 2025–26 season.

=== Barrow ===
On 25 June 2026, Kalambayi transferred to National League club Barrow. The move reunited him with his former Kidderminster Harriers manager Adam Murray.

== Personal life ==
Kalambayi attended The Charter School. He is of Congolese descent.

== Career statistics ==
As of match played 5 September 2026

Appearances and goals by club, season and competition
Club	Season	League			National cup (Note: Includes FA Cup)		League cup (Note: Includes EFL Cup, National League Cup)		Other		Total	
Club	Season	Division	Apps	Goals	Apps	Goals	Apps	Goals	Apps	Goals	Apps	Goals
AFC Wimbledon	2015–16	League Two	0	0	0	0	0	0	0	0	0	0
AFC Wimbledon	2016–17	League One	0	0	0	0	0	0	0	0	0	0
AFC Wimbledon	2017–18	League One	0	0	0	0	0	0	2 (Note: Appearance(s) in EFL Trophy)	0	2	0
AFC Wimbledon	2018–19	League One	17	0	1	0	0	0	1	0	19	0
AFC Wimbledon	2019–20	League One	16	0	2	0	1	0	3	0	22	0
AFC Wimbledon	2020–21	League One	14	0	0	0	1	0	4	0	19	0
AFC Wimbledon	2021–22	League One	13	0	0	0	2	0	1	1	16	1
AFC Wimbledon	2022–23	League Two	26	1	3	0	1	0	2	1	32	2
AFC Wimbledon	2023–24	League Two	2	0	1	0	0	0	4	0	7	0
AFC Wimbledon	Total		88	1	7	0	5	0	17	2	117	3
Tonbridge Angels (loan)	2017–18	Isthmian League Premier Division	7	0	—		—		—		7	0
Dagenham & Redbridge	2024–25	National League	40	0	3	0	3	1	2 (Note: 1 appearance in FA Trophy, 1 appearance in Essex Senior Cup)	0	48	1
Dagenham & Redbridge	2025–26	National League South	16	1	1	0	—		—		17	1
Dagenham & Redbridge	Total		56	1	4	0	3	1	2	0	65	2
Kidderminster Harriers (loan)	2025–26	National League North	21	0	—		—		5 (Note: Appearances in FA Trophy)	1	26	1
Barrow	2026–27	National League	6	0	0	0	—		0	0	6	0
Career total			178	2	11	0	8	1	24	3	221	6
