= Anthony Hartigan =

English footballer (born 2000)

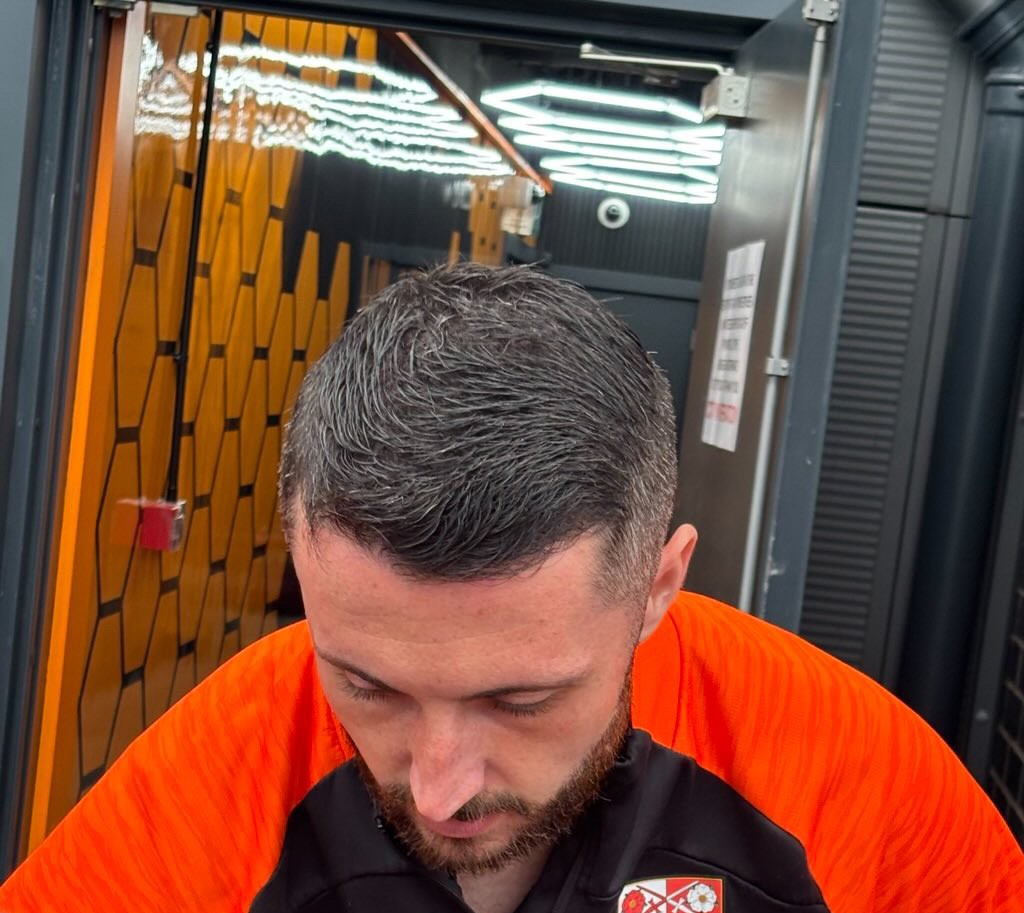
- Hartigan in 2025

Personal information
- Full name: Anthony Rhys Hartigan
- Date of birth: 27 January 2000 (age 26)
- Place of birth: Kingston-upon-Thames, England
- Height: 5 ft 10 in (1.78 m)
- Position: Midfielder

Team information
- Current team: Southend United
- Number: 4

Youth career
- 2014–2017: AFC Wimbledon

Senior career*
Years	Team	Apps	(Gls)
2017–2022	AFC Wimbledon	118	(1)
2021	→ Newport County (loan)	11	(0)
2022–2024	Mansfield Town	20	(0)
2023–2024	→ Barnet (loan)	45	(3)
2024–2026	Barnet	78	(3)
2026–	Southend United	8	(0)
- * Club domestic league appearances and goals as of 16 September 2026 (UTC)

Anthony Rhys Hartigan (born 27 January 2000) is an English professional footballer who plays as a central midfielder for National League club Southend United.

== Career ==
=== AFC Wimbledon ===
Hartigan joined AFC Wimbledon aged 14, after being spotted playing for the coaching company Pro Direct Soccer. He signed his first professional contract on his 17th birthday. On 8 August 2017, he made his debut in a 3–1 EFL Cup defeat to Brentford. Playing the full 120 minutes, with the game going to extra time, he became the first player to represent AFC Wimbledon born in the 2000s. He scored his first goal for Wimbledon in an EFL Trophy tie against Barnet on 29 August 2017.

On 15 April 2018, Hartigan was named the LFE Apprentice of the Year award for League One at the EFL Awards ceremony in London.

Following relegation, Hartigan was offered a new contract at the end of the 2021–22 season. On 5 July 2022, AFC Wimbledon announced that Hartigan had decided to leave the club following the expiry of his contract.

==== Newport County (loan) ====
Hartigan joined League Two club Newport County on loan until the end of the 2020–21 season on 25 January 2021. He made his debut for Newport in the starting line up for the 2–1 defeat against Harrogate Town in League Two on 30 January 2021. Hartigan played for Newport in the League Two play-off final at Wembley Stadium on 31 May 2021 which Newport lost to Morecambe, 1–0 after a 107th minute penalty.

=== Mansfield Town ===
On 4 August 2022, Hartigan signed for League Two club Mansfield Town on a two-year contract, a compensation package being agreed with AFC Wimbledon on account of Hartigan's age. Hartigan played frequently early in the season, but was sidelined after a shoulder injury on New Year's Day.

==== Barnet (loan) ====
In August 2023, Hartigan joined Barnet on a season-long loan. For the 2023–24 season, Hartigan was named as Barnet's Players' Player, Manager's Player and Young Player of the Season for the campaign. He also received the club's Goal of the Season award.

On 7 May 2024, Mansfield announced he would be released in the summer when his contract expired.

=== Barnet ===
On 24 June 2024, it was announced that Hartigan had joined Barnet on a permanent basis on a two-year contract. After six goals in 137 appearances, he left the club following the expiry of his contract.

=== Southend United ===
In June 2026, Southend United announced that Hartigan was joining them for the 2026–27 season.

== Personal life ==
Hartigan is of Welsh descent through his great-grandmother.

== Career statistics ==
As of end of 2025–26 season

Appearances and goals by club, season and competition
Club	Season	League			FA Cup		EFL Cup		Other		Total	
Club	Season	Division	Apps	Goals	Apps	Goals	Apps	Goals	Apps	Goals	Apps	Goals
AFC Wimbledon	2017–18	League One	11	0	1	0	1	0	3 (Note: Appearances in EFL Trophy)	1	16	1
AFC Wimbledon	2018–19	League One	31	0	4	1	2	0	4	1	41	2
AFC Wimbledon	2019–20	League One	27	0	2	0	1	0	2	0	32	0
AFC Wimbledon	2020–21	League One	15	0	2	0	1	0	3	0	21	0
AFC Wimbledon	2021–22	League One	34	1	3	0	3	1	2	0	42	2
AFC Wimbledon	Total		118	1	12	1	8	1	14	2	152	5
Newport County (loan)	2020–21	League Two	11	0	0	0	0	0	3 (Note: Appearances in League Two playoffs)	0	14	0
Mansfield Town	2022–23	League Two	19	0	1	0	1	0	3	0	24	0
Mansfield Town	2023–24	League Two	1	0	0	0	0	0	0	0	1	0
Mansfield Town	Total		20	0	1	0	1	0	3	0	25	0
Barnet (loan)	2023–24	National League	44	3	5	0	0	0	5 (Note: Four appearances in FA Trophy, one in National League playoffs)	0	54	3
Barnet	2024–25	National League	46	2	2	0	0	0	0	0	48	2
Barnet	2025–26	League Two	32	1	1	0	1	0	1	0	35	1
Barnet	Total		122	6	8	0	1	0	6	0	137	6
Career total			271	7	21	1	10	1	26	2	327	11

== Honours ==
Barnet

- National League: 2024–25

Individual

- Barnet Players' Player of the Season: 2023–24
- Barnet Manager's Player of the Season: 2023–24
- Barnet Young Player of the Season: 2023–24
- Barnet Goal of the Season: 2023–24
- National League Team of the Season: 2023–24, 2024–25
