= Great Evans =

English footballer

Personal information
- Full name: Great Nii-Okai Evans
- Date of birth: 25 October 2000 (age 26)
- Place of birth: London, England
- Position: Striker

Team information
- Current team: Bracknell Town
- Number: 11

Youth career
- Bedfont Sports
- –2017: AFC Wimbledon

Senior career*
Years	Team	Apps	(Gls)
2017–2018	AFC Wimbledon	0	(0)
2018	Metropolitan Police	0	(0)
2018	Hayes & Yeading United	3	(0)
2018–2019	South Park	23	(13)
2019	Merstham	4	(0)
2019–2020	South Park	14	(6)
2020	Wingate & Finchley	6	(2)
2020	Leatherhead	5	(0)
2021	Cheshunt	0	(0)
2022	Harrow Borough	8	(1)
2022–2023	Kingstonian	8	(2)
2023–2024	Hungerford Town	26	(3)
2024	Bracknell Town	16	(7)
2024–2026	Farnham Town	41	(13)
2026	Uxbridge	0	(0)
2026–	Bracknell Town	0	(0)
- * Club domestic league appearances and goals as of 16:51, 26 October 2025 (UTC)

Great Nii-Okai Evans (born 25 October 2000) is an English footballer who plays as a striker for Southern League Premier Division South club Bracknell Town.

== Career ==
Evans joined AFC Wimbledon's academy at the age of 16 from Bedfont Sports. He made his professional debut on 5 December 2017, coming on as a substitute in a 2–0 EFL Trophy defeat away to Yeovil Town.

Released at the end of the 2017–18 season, Evans joined Metropolitan Police before signing for Hayes & Yeading United in September 2018, scoring three goals in 11 appearances. He moved to South Park in December 2018, spent time on trial with Torquay United in July 2019, and signed for Merstham two months later. He returned to South Park the following month before joining Wingate & Finchley in February 2020.

On 12 June 2020, Evans agreed to join fellow Isthmian League Premier Division club Leatherhead.

In February 2023, Evans signed for National League South club Hungerford Town.

Evans joined Bracknell Town in March 2024.

In September 2024, Evans signed for Isthmian League South Central Division club Farnham Town. On 16 May 2026, Farnham Town confirmed that Evans would leave the club, although he had been invited to take part in pre-season following the club's promotion to the National League South.

On 28 May 2026, Evans agreed to join Uxbridge following his departure from Farnham Town. After spending just two months with Uxbridge, he returned to former club Bracknell Town in late July.

== Career statistics ==
As of match played 21 October 2025.

Club	Season	League			FA Cup		League Cup		Other		Total	
Club	Season	Division	Apps	Goals	Apps	Goals	Apps	Goals	Apps	Goals	Apps	Goals
AFC Wimbledon	2017–18	League One	0	0	0	0	0	0	1 (Note: Appearances in the EFL Trophy)	0	1	0
Metropolitan Police	2018–19	Southern League Premier Division South	0	0	0	0	—		0	0	0	0
Hayes & Yeading United	2018–19	Isthmian League South Central Division	3	0	1	0	—		4 (Note: Two appearances in the Alan Turvey Trophy, two in the FA Trophy)	0	8	0
South Park	2018–19	Isthmian League South Central Division	23	13	—		—		—		23	13
Merstham	2019–20	Isthmian League Premier Division	4	0	0	0	—		0	0	4	0
South Park	2019–20	Isthmian League South Central Division	14	6	—		—		0	0	14	6
Wingate & Finchley	2019–20	Isthmian League Premier Division	6	2	—		—		—		6	2
Leatherhead	2020–21	Isthmian League Premier Division	5	0	1	0	—		0	0	6	0
Cheshunt	2021–22	Isthmian League Premier Division	0	0	0	0	—		0	0	0	0
Harrow Borough	2022–23	Southern League Premier Division South	8	1	—		—		2 (Note: Appearances in the FA Trophy)	0	10	1
Kingstonian	2022–23	Isthmian League Premier Division	8	2	—		—		—		8	2
Hungerford Town	2022–23	National League South	12	2	—		—		—		12	2
Hungerford Town	2023–24	Southern League Premier Division South	14	1	0	0	—		3	1	17	2
Hungerford Town	Total		26	3	0	0	—		3	1	29	4
Bracknell Town	2023–24	Southern League Premier Division South	11	6	—		—		1 (Note: Appearance in the Southern League Premier Division South play-offs)	0	12	6
Bracknell Town	2024–25	Southern League Premier Division South	5	1	1	0	—		0	0	6	1
Bracknell Town	Total		16	7	1	0	—		1	0	18	7
Farnham Town	2024–25	Isthmian League South Central Division	34	12	—		—		—		34	12
Farnham Town	2025–26	Southern League Premier Division South	7	1	3	1	—		0	0	10	2
Farnham Town	Total		41	13	3	1	—		0	0	44	14
Uxbridge	2026–27	Southern League Premier Division South	0	0	0	0	—		0	0	0	0
Bracknell Town	2026–27	Southern League Premier Division South	0	0	0	0	—		0	0	0	0
Career total			154	47	6	1	0	0	11	1	171	49
