= Alfie Egan =

English footballer (born 1997)

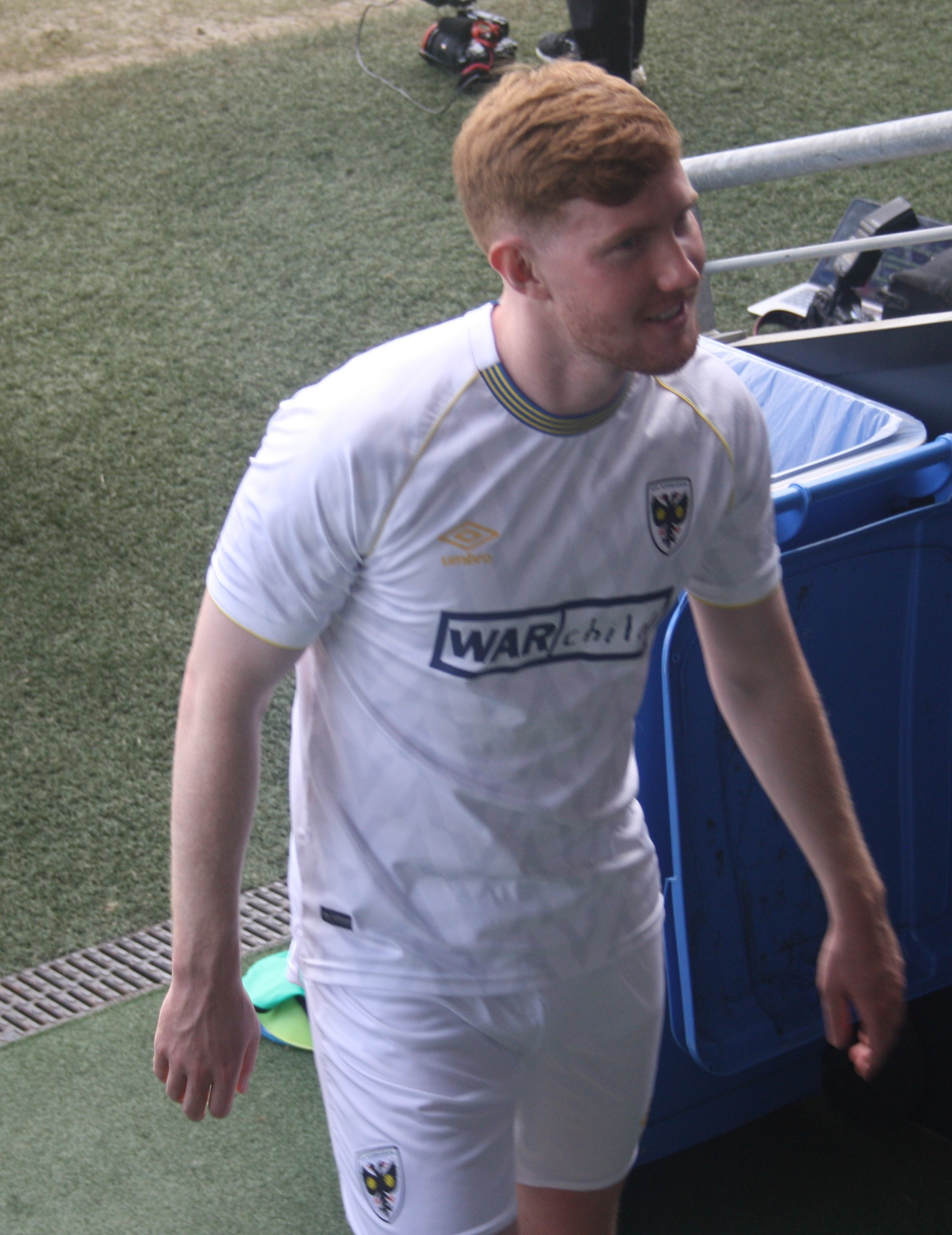
- Alfie Egan in 2025.

Personal information
- Full name: Alfie Patrick Egan
- Date of birth: 3 September 1997 (age 29)
- Place of birth: Lambeth, England
- Height: 1.79 m (5 ft 10 1/2 in)
- Position: Midfielder

Team information
- Current team: Dulwich Hamlet

Youth career
- –2016: AFC Wimbledon

Senior career*
Years	Team	Apps	(Gls)
2016–2019	AFC Wimbledon	21	(1)
2017	→ Sutton United (loan)	4	(0)
2018	→ East Thurrock United (loan)	8	(0)
2019	→ Kingstonian (loan)	7	(0)
2019–2022	Ebbsfleet United	61	(6)
2021	→ Maidenhead United (loan)	10	(0)
2022	Boreham Wood	0	(0)
2022–2023	Dorking Wanderers	13	(0)
2023	Lewes	7	(0)
2023–2024	AFC Totton	6	(0)
2024–	Dulwich Hamlet	0	(0)
- * Club domestic league appearances and goals as of 15:03, 8 January 2024 (UTC)

Alfie Patrick Egan (born 3 September 1997) is an English footballer who plays as a midfielder for Isthmian League Premier Division club Dulwich Hamlet.

== Career ==
Egan began his career with AFC Wimbledon by making his first-team debut in the EFL Trophy win against Plymouth Argyle. A league debut for Egan came just five days later as a late substitute on 9 October 2016 in a 3–1 win against Oxford United. He scored his first goal for Wimbledon in an EFL Trophy tie against Stevenage on 6 November 2018. Egan played out on loan at Sutton United, East Thurrock United and Kingstonian. He was released by the Dons at the end of the 2018-19 season.

Egan signed for Ebbsfleet United in July 2019 after a successful trial. He signed a new deal at the end of the season and then another new contract in March 2021 to keep him at the club until the end of the 2021-22 season. After signing this contract, he joined Maidenhead United on loan until June 2021.

On 1 July 2022, Egan joined National League club Boreham Wood following his departure from Ebbsfleet United. Having failed to make an appearance for the club, Egan departed for Dorking Wanderers on 8 September 2022 in a search for more playing time. At the end of the season, he departed the club and joined Lewes.

Following a falling out with the manager, Egan departed Lewes and joined AFC Totton in November 2023. In January 2024, he joined Dulwich Hamlet, having played for the club's academy.

== Career statistics ==
As of end of 2022–23 season

Appearances and goals by club, season and competition
Club	Season	League			FA Cup		League Cup		Other		Total	
Club	Season	Division	Apps	Goals	Apps	Goals	Apps	Goals	Apps	Goals	Apps	Goals
AFC Wimbledon	2016–17	League One	9	0	0	0	0	0	3 (Note: Appearances in the EFL Trophy)	0	12	0
AFC Wimbledon	2017–18	League One	2	0	0	0	1	0	3	0	6	0
AFC Wimbledon	2018–19	League One	1	0	0	0	0	0	2	1	3	1
AFC Wimbledon	Total		12	0	0	0	1	0	8	1	21	1
Sutton United (loan)	2017–18	National League	4	0	0	0	0	0	1 (Note: Appearances in Surrey Senior Cup)	1	5	1
East Thurrock United (loan)	2018–19	National League South	8	0	0	0	0	0	0	0	8	0
Kingstonian (loan)	2018–19	Isthmian League Premier Division	7	0	0	0	0	0	0	0	7	0
Ebbsfleet United	2019–20	National League	19	0	3	0	0	0	3 (Note: Appearances in the FA Trophy)	0	25	0
Ebbsfleet United	2020–21	National League South	13	2	0	0	0	0	1	0	14	2
Ebbsfleet United	Total		32	2	3	0	0	0	4	0	39	2
Maidenhead United (loan)	2020–21	National League	10	0	0	0	0	0	0	0	10	0
Ebbsfleet United	2021–22	National League South	27	4	2	0	—		1	0	30	4
Dorking Wanderers	2022–23	National League	13	0	0	0	—		0	0	13	0
Lewes	2023–24	Isthmian League Premier Division	7	0	1	0	—		1	0	9	0
Career total			120	6	6	0	1	0	14	2	140	8
