= Ethan Nelson-Roberts =

English footballer (born 2000)

Personal information
- Full name: Ethan Cameron O'Neil Nelson-Roberts
- Date of birth: 3 December 2000 (age 25)
- Place of birth: London, England
- Position: Midfielder

Team information
- Current team: Cheshunt

Youth career
- –2017: AFC Wimbledon

Senior career*
Years	Team	Apps	(Gls)
2017–2019	AFC Wimbledon	0	(0)
2019	Cheshunt	2	(0)
- * Club domestic league appearances and goals as of 02:00, 6 December 2017 (UTC)

Ethan Cameron O'Neil Nelson-Roberts (born 3 December 2000) is an English professional footballer. He plays for Isthmian League side Cheshunt in Central Midfield.

== Playing career ==
Nelson-Roberts joined AFC Wimbledon's youth set-up aged 12. In 2017/18 season he became Captain of AFC Wimbledon Under 18 Academy team. On 5 December, he made his professional debut as a substitute in a 2–0 EFL Trophy defeat at Yeovil Town.

== Statistics ==
Appearances and goals by club, season and competition
Club	Season	League			FA Cup		EFL Cup		Other		Total	
Club	Season	Division	Apps	Goals	Apps	Goals	Apps	Goals	Apps	Goals	Apps	Goals
AFC Wimbledon	2017–18	League One	0	0	0	0	0	0	1 (Note: One appearance in the EFL Trophy.)	0	1	0
Career total			0	0	0	0	0	0	1	0	1	0
