= Neşet Bellikli =

English footballer

Personal information
- Full name: Neşet Can Bellikli
- Date of birth: 9 July 1998 (age 28)
- Place of birth: Sutton, England
- Position: Winger

Team information
- Current team: Zonguldak Kömürspor (on loan from Ankara Keçiörengücü)

Youth career
- AFC Wimbledon

Senior career*
Years	Team	Apps	(Gls)
2016–2018	AFC Wimbledon	0	(0)
2018–2019	Sutton Common Rovers	17	(2)
2019	Sutton United	7	(0)
2020–	Ankara Keçiörengücü	0	(0)
2020–	→ Zonguldak Kömürspor (loan)	16	(0)
- * Club domestic league appearances and goals as of 23:16, 25 May 2021 (UTC)

Neşet Can Bellikli (born 9 July 1998) is an English footballer who plays as a winger for Zonguldak Kömürspor on loan from Ankara Keçiörengücü.

== Career ==
On 29 August 2017, Bellikli made his professional debut for AFC Wimbledon as a substitute in a 4-3 win over Barnet in the EFL Trophy. The following season, Bellikili joined Combined Counties League side Sutton Common Rovers, playing 21 matches in all competitions. He finished the season by playing for National League side Sutton United. After signing a three-year deal with Turkish side Ankara Keçiörengücü, in October 2020, Bellikli was loaned out to Zonguldak Kömürspor.

== Career statistics ==
As of match played 29 August 2017.

Club statistics
Club	Season	League			FA Cup		League Cup		Other		Total	
Club	Season	Division	Apps	Goals	Apps	Goals	Apps	Goals	Apps	Goals	Apps	Goals
AFC Wimbledon
AFC Wimbledon	2017–18	0	0	0	0	0	0	1 (Note: Appearance in EFL Trophy.)	0	1	0	
Career total			0	0	0	0	0	0	1	0	1	0
