= Egli Kaja =

Albanian professional footballer (born 1997)

Personal information
- Full name: Egli Kaja
- Date of birth: 26 July 1997 (age 29)
- Place of birth: Prelez i Jerlive, Ferizaj, FR Yugoslavia (modern Kosovo)
- Height: 1.77 m (5 ft 10 in)
- Position: Winger

Youth career
- 2003–2006: MHD
- 2006–2008: Kingstonian
- 2008–2015: AFC Wimbledon

Senior career*
Years	Team	Apps	(Gls)
2015–2019	AFC Wimbledon	22	(0)
2016	→ Lewes (loan)	7	(1)
2018	→ Livingston (loan)	6	(0)
2019–2020	Northampton Town	4	(0)
2021–2022	AFC Wimbledon	5	(0)
2022	Hampton & Richmond Borough	2	(0)
2022–2023	Altrincham	15	(1)
- * Club domestic league appearances and goals as of 14:31, 10 May 2023 (UTC) ‡ National team caps and goals as of 13 May 2017

Egli Kaja (born 26 July 1997) is an Albanian professional footballer who plays as a winger. Kaja also represents Albania and received his first international call-up in May 2017.

== Club career ==
Kaja's career began in 2003 with youth side MHD, where he was offered the opportunity to join Middlesbrough. Having finished as top scorer for three consecutive seasons, Kaja joined Kingstonian in 2006 upon moving to London. Once again finishing as top scorer in the youth set-up, he turned down a trial with Chelsea in order to join AFC Wimbledon. Enjoying a brief stint with AC Milan on trial, he later featured for the Dons on a scholarship, and turned down a second chance to compete for a contract in Milan the following season.

Kaja signed a professional contract with AFC Wimbledon in April 2015, and made his first team debut on Saturday 26 September. Coming off the bench in a 2–0 defeat to Luton Town, he also made a substitute appearance three days later in a 1–1 draw with Northampton Town. He scored his first goal for Wimbledon in an EFL Trophy tie against Barnet on 29 August 2017.

On 16 December 2016 Kaja was sent on loan to Lewes in the 2016–17 Isthmian League for one month. He made his debut on 31 December 2016 against Three Bridges in a 4–2 win. He scored his first and only goal for Lewes on 10 January 2017 against Herne Bay in a 2–4 away win.

In July 2018, Kaja joined newly promoted Scottish Premiership side Livingston on a season-long loan but was recalled by new Wimbledon manager Wally Downes in December.

On 2 September 2019, Kaja joined Northampton on a free transfer until January 2020.

On 26 November 2021, Kaja returned to AFC Wimbledon on a short-term deal.

On 5 August 2022, following his release from AFC Wimbledon, Kaja joined Hampton & Richmond Borough after impressing during pre-season.

Just a few days after joining Hampton & Richmond Borough, Kaja left to join Altrincham. He was released at the end of the 2022–23 season.

== International career ==
Kaja received his first international call up at the Albania national under-21 football team by coach Alban Bushi for a gathering between 14 and 17 May 2017 with most of the players selected from Albanian championships.

== Style of play ==
Kaja is able to "play on either wing, or be deployed as a second striker". Upon signing for Livingston on loan, player-manager Kenny Miller described him as "quick, powerful and direct" adding that he "will bring a different dimension to our offensive options".

== Career statistics ==
=== Club ===
As of end of 2022–23 season

Club statistics
Club	Season	League			National Cup		League Cup		Other		Total	
Club	Season	Division	Apps	Goals	Apps	Goals	Apps	Goals	Apps	Goals	Apps	Goals
AFC Wimbledon	2015–16	League Two	2	0	0	0	0	0	0	0	2	0
AFC Wimbledon	2016–17	League One	1	0	0	0	0	0	0	0	1	0
AFC Wimbledon	2017–18	League One	19	0	0	0	1	0	4 (Note: Appearances in the EFL Trophy)	2	24	2
AFC Wimbledon	Total		22	0	0	0	1	0	4	2	27	2
Lewes (loan)	2016–17	Isthmian League Premier Division	7	1	—		—		0	0	7	1
Livingston (loan)	2018–19	Scottish Premiership	6	0	0	0	2	0	—		8	0
Northampton Town	2019–20	League Two	4	0	0	0	0	0	0	0	4	0
AFC Wimbledon	2021–22	League One	5	0	2	0	0	0	0	0	7	0
Hampton & Richmond Borough	2022–23	National League South	2	0	0	0	—		0	0	2	0
Altrincham	2022–23	National League	15	1	1	0	—		2 (Note: Appearance(s) in FA Trophy)	0	18	1
Career total			61	2	3	0	3	0	6	2	73	4
