= Jayden Antwi-Nyame =

English footballer

Personal information
- Date of birth: 30 November 1998 (age 27)
- Place of birth: London, England
- Position: Forward

Youth career
- 2011–2017: AFC Wimbledon

Senior career*
Years	Team	Apps	(Gls)
2017–2018	AFC Wimbledon	1	(0)
2018	→ Farnborough (loan)	7	(2)
2018	East Grinstead Town		
2018	Scarborough Athletic		
2019	Merstham		
2019	Cheshunt		
2019–2020	Tonbridge Angels	2	(0)
- * Club domestic league appearances and goals as of 10:52, 6 May 2019 (UTC)

Jayden Antwi-Nyame (born 1998) is an English footballer who plays as a forward.

== Playing career ==
Antwi joined AFC Wimbledon's youth team in 2011 and signed his first professional contract with the club on 28 March 2017. He made his senior debut four days later, coming on for Tom Elliott 72 minutes into a 2–0 defeat to Port Vale at Vale Park.

He was released by AFC Wimbledon at the end of the 2017–18 season.

== Statistics ==
Appearances and goals by club, season and competition
Club	Season	League			FA Cup		EFL Cup		Other		Total	
Club	Season	Division	Apps	Goals	Apps	Goals	Apps	Goals	Apps	Goals	Apps	Goals
AFC Wimbledon	2016–17	EFL League One	1	0	0	0	0	0	0	0	1	0
Career total			1	0	0	0	0	0	0	0	1	0
