= 2009–10 Charlton Athletic F.C. season =

Charlton Athletic
2009–10 season
- Manager: Phil Parkinson
- Stadium: The Valley
- Football League One: 4th (qualified for play-offs)
- Play-offs: Semi-finals
- FA Cup: First round
- League Cup: First round
- Football League Trophy: Southern Section quarter-finals
- Top goalscorer: League: Deon Burton (12); All: Deon Burton (13)
Home colours	Away colours

During the 2009–10 English football season, Charlton Athletic F.C. competed in Football League One, the third tier of English football, following relegation from the Championship in the 2008–09 season. It was the first time Charlton had been in the third tier since being promoted from the old Third Division in the 1980–81 season, 28 years prior. Along with competing in League One, the club also participated in the FA Cup, League Cup, and the Football League Trophy. The season covered the period from 1 July 2009 to 30 June 2010.

== Season summary ==
Charlton managed to start off their first season after relegation from the Championship with some good results and looked safe bets for an automatic return to the second tier of English football, but a late slump saw Charlton fall to fourth, still good enough for a playoff spot. After a 2–1 defeat at the County Ground and a 2–1 win at The Valley saw Charlton draw 3–3 on aggregate with Swindon Town, the two teams went to a penalty shootout. Nicky Bailey missed his penalty to give Swindon the win, thus condemning Charlton to another season in the third tier.

Charlton also suffered demoralising defeats in the first rounds in both domestic cups. In the FA Cup, Charlton lost 1–0 to Northwich Victoria at Victoria Stadium, while, in the League Cup, Charlton lost 1–0 after extra time to Hereford United at Edgar Street.

== Kit ==
Spanish company Joma remained Charlton's kit manufacturers, and introduced a new home and a new away kit for the season, the home kit featuring a white vertical stripe last seen on the club's centenary kit in 2005, the away kit featuring black shorts and socks and a blue and black striped shirt. The kits were sponsored by krbs.com, but, for the match against Millwall on 19 December, the clubs both wore kits sponsoring the Street Violence Ruins Lives campaign, with proceeds going to the Rob Knox Memorial Fund. Rob Knox was an actor and a Charlton fan who was stabbed to death in a street attack in May 2008.

== Players ==
=== First-team squad ===
Squad at end of season

Note: Flags indicate national team as defined under FIFA eligibility rules; some limited exceptions apply. Players may hold more than one non-FIFA nationality.

No.	Pos.	Nation	Player
1	GK	IRL	Rob Elliot (Note: Elliot was born in Greenwich, England, but also qualified to represent the Republic of Ireland internationally through his father and represented them at under-19 level before making his international debut for the Republic of Ireland in May 2014.)
2	DF	ENG	Frazer Richardson
3	DF	CAF	Kelly Youga
4	MF	ENG	Nicky Bailey
5	DF	ESP	Miguel Llera
6	DF	POR	José Semedo
7	MF	ENG	Jonjo Shelvey
8	MF	FRA	Therry Racon (Note: Racon was born in Villeneuve-Saint-Georges, France, but also qualified to represent Guadeloupe internationally and would make his international debut for Guadeloupe in June 2011.)
9	FW	ENG	Leon McKenzie
10	FW	JAM	Deon Burton (Note: Burton was born in Reading, England, but also qualified to represent Jamaica internationally and made his international debut for Jamaica in September 1997.)
11	MF	ENG	Lloyd Sam (Note: Sam was born in Leeds, England, and represented them at U-20 level, but also qualified to represent Ghana internationally through his parents and would make his international debut for Ghana in October 2015.)
12	DF	WAL	Grant Basey (Note: Basey was born in Bromley, England, but also qualified to represent Wales internationally through his grandmother and represented them at U-17, U-19, and U-21 level.)
14	MF	ENG	Matthew Spring
16	MF	ENG	Scott Wagstaff
17	FW	GHA	Chris Dickson (Note: Dickson was born in Southwark, England, but also qualified to represent Ghana and Jamaica internationally through his father and mother respectively and made his international debut for Ghana in August 2008.)
18	DF	NGR	Sam Sodje (Note: Sodje was born in Greenwich, England, but also qualified to represent Nigeria internationally through his parents and made his international debut for Nigeria in November 2005.)

No.	Pos.	Nation	Player
20	DF	ENG	Chris Solly
23	FW	IRL	David Mooney (on loan from Reading)
24	MF	ENG	Kyel Reid (on loan from Sheffield United)
25	GK	IRL	Darren Randolph
26	MF	CYP	Alex Stavrinou (Note: Stavrinou was born in Harlow, England, but also qualifies to represent Cyprus internationally through his father and has represented them at U-17 level.)
27	DF	ENG	Yado Mambo
28	FW	TUR	Tamer Tuna (Note: Tuna was born in Bexley, England, but also qualified to represent Turkey internationally and represented them at U-19 level.)
29	DF	ENG	Jack Clark
30	MF	ENG	Ben Davisson
32	GK	ENG	Jack Binks
33	FW	ENG	Akpo Sodje (on loan from Sheffield Wednesday)
35	DF	SCO	Christian Dailly
38	DF	ENG	Gary Borrowdale (on loan from Queens Park Rangers)
39	FW	ENG	Nicky Forster (on loan from Brighton & Hove Albion)
40	GK	TTO	Tony Warner (Note: Warner was born in Liverpool, England, but also qualified to represent Trinidad and Tobago internationally and made his international debut for Trinidad and Tobago in February 2006.)
41	DF	ENG	Matt Fry (on loan from West Ham United)

=== Left club during season ===
Note: Flags indicate national team as defined under FIFA eligibility rules; some limited exceptions apply. Players may hold more than one non-FIFA nationality.

No.	Pos.	Nation	Player
9	FW	SCO	Andy Gray (Note: Gray was born in Harrogate, England, but also qualified to represent Scotland internationally through his father and made his international debut for Scotland in April 2003.) (to Barnsley)
15	FW	ENG	Izale McLeod (on loan to Peterborough United)
19	MF	ENG	Dean Sinclair (on loan to Grimsby Town)
21	MF	ENG	Wade Small (to Chesterfield)
21	MF	ENG	Luke Holden (on loan from Rhyl)

No.	Pos.	Nation	Player
22	MF	WAL	Stuart Fleetwood (Note: Fleetwood was born in Gloucester, England, but also qualified to represent Wales internationally through his father, and represented them at U-17 and U-21 level.) (on loan to Exeter City)
24	GK	ENG	Carl Ikeme (Note: Ikeme was born in Sutton Coldfield, England, but also qualifies to represent Nigeria internationally and was first called up in March 2007 before making his international debut for Nigeria in September 2015.) (on loan from Wolverhampton Wanderers)
31	DF	ENG	Elliot Omozusi (on loan from Fulham)
37	MF	ENG	Johnnie Jackson (on loan from Notts County)

== Transfers ==
=== In ===
Date	Position	Name	Club From	Fee	Ref.
2 July 2009	DF	Miguel Llera	MK Dons	Free	
9 July 2009	DF	Frazer Richardson	Leeds United	Free	
1 September 2009	FW	Leon McKenzie	Coventry City	Free	
1 September 2009	DF	Sam Sodje	Reading	Free	
25 March 2010	GK	Tony Warner		Free	

=== Out ===
Date	Position	Name	Club To	Fee	Ref.
1 July 2009	MF	Darren Ambrose	Crystal Palace	Free	
2 July 2009	DF	Mark Hudson	Cardiff City	£1,075,000	
8 July 2009	MF	Zheng Zhi		Released (joined Celtic on 25 September)	
21 August 2009	FW	Andy Gray	Barnsley	Undisclosed	

=== Loans in ===
Date	Position	Name	Club From	Duration	Ref.
1 September 2009	MF	Luke Holden	Rhyl	Three months	
14 November 2009	FW	Akpo Sodje	Sheffield Wednesday	One month	
10 December 2009	FW	Akpo Sodje	Sheffield Wednesday	One month	
14 January 2010	FW	David Mooney	Reading	One month	
29 January 2010	FW	Kyel Reid	Sheffield United	Until end of season	
31 January 2010	FW	Akpo Sodje	Sheffield Wednesday	Until end of season	
18 February 2010	MF	Johnnie Jackson	Notts County	One month	
19 March 2010	DF	Gary Borrowdale	Queens Park Rangers	One month	
25 March 2010	FW	Nicky Forster	Brighton and Hove Albion	Until end of season	
25 March 2010	DF	Matt Fry	West Ham United	Until end of season	

=== Loans out ===
Date	Position	Name	Club To	Duration	Ref.
9 January 2010	FW	Izale McLeod	Peterborough United	Until end of season	

== Competitions ==
=== League One ===
==== League table ====
Pos	Team	Pld	W	D	L	GF	GA	GD	Pts	Promotion, qualification or relegation
2	Leeds United (P)	46	25	11	10	77	44	+33	86	Promotion to Football League Championship
3	Millwall (O, P)	46	24	13	9	76	44	+32	85	Qualification for League One play-offs
4	Charlton Athletic	46	23	15	8	71	48	+23	84	Qualification for League One play-offs
5	Swindon Town	46	22	16	8	73	57	+16	82	Qualification for League One play-offs
6	Huddersfield Town	46	23	11	12	82	56	+26	80	Qualification for League One play-offs

Source: The Football League
Rules for classification: 1) points; 2) goal difference; 3) number of goals scored.
(O) Play-off winners; (P) Promoted

==== Matches ====
Win	Draw	Loss

Date	Opponent	Venue	Result F–A	Scorers	Attendance	Referee	Ref.
8 August 2009	Wycombe Wanderers	H	3–2	Dailly 21', Bailey 23', Llera 50'	16,552	Deadman	
15 August 2009	Hartlepool United	A	2–0	Burton 23', Bailey 27'	4,408	Boyeson	
18 August 2009	Leyton Orient	A	2–1	Burton 64', Shelvey 84'	7,376	Crossley	
22 August 2009	Walsall	H	2–0	Llera 30', Wagstaff 72'	15,306	Hooper	
29 August 2009	Tranmere Rovers	A	4–0	Sam 24', 49', Semedo 26', Bailey 68'	5,417	Tierney	
5 September 2009	Brentford	H	2–0	Burton 11', Sam 30'	16,399	Linington	
12 September 2009	Southampton	H	1–1	Burton 49'	19,441	Wright	
19 September 2009	Norwich City	A	2–2	Burton 18', Shelvey 40'	24,018	Tanner	
26 September 2009	Exeter City	H	2–1	Bailey 43', McLeod 87'	16,867	Hegley	
29 September 2009	Colchester United	A	0–3		7,098	Russell	
3 October 2009	Leeds United	A	0–0		31,838	Mathieson	
10 October 2009	Oldham Athletic	H	0–0		16,441	Horwood	
17 October 2009	Huddersfield Town	H	2–1	S. Sodje 8', McLeod 49'	16,991	East	
24 October 2009	Gillingham	A	1–1	Nutter 79' o.g.	10,304	Moss	
31 October 2009	Carlisle United	A	1–3	Burton 45+1' pen.	6,077	Haywood	
14 November 2009	Milton Keynes Dons	H	5–1	Mooney 13', Bailey 21', Sam 65', S. Sodje 73', Burton 76'	17,188	Hill	
21 November 2009	Yeovil Town	A	1–1	A. Sodje 56'	5,632	Hooper	
24 November 2009	Bristol Rovers	H	4–2	Mooney 4', Burton 16' pen., Bailey 68', A. Sodje 86'	15,885	Cook	
1 December 2009	Brighton & Hove Albion	A	2–0	Burton 29', Wagstaff 37'	6,769	Ward	
5 December 2009	Southend United	H	1–0	Burton 25'	17,445	McDermid	
12 December 2009	Stockport County	A	2–1	S. Sodje 13', Wagstaff 74'	4,277	Ilderton	
19 December 2009	Millwall	H	4–4	Burton 31' pen., 38' pen., Bailey 47', Morison 85' o.g.	19,105	Jones	
26 December 2009	Swindon Town	H	2–2	Shelvey 38', Llera 90+4'	17,977	Miller	
28 December 2009	Brentford	A	1–1	Bailey 58' pen.	8,387	D'Urso	
16 January 2010	Wycombe Wanderers	A	2–1	Shelvey 11', Bailey 77'		Evans	
19 January 2010	Hartlepool United	H	2–1	Mooney 31', Wagstaff 79'	14,636	Tanner	
25 January 2010	Leyton Orient	H	0–1		15,955	Moss	
30 January 2010	Tranmere Rovers	H	1–1	Bailey 57'	16,168	Sutton	
2 February 2010	Walsall	A	1–1	Burton 45+2' pen.	3,417	Haines	
6 February 2010	Swindon Town	A	1–1	Bailey 90+3'	9,552	Hall	
15 February 2010	Bristol Rovers	A	1–2	Racon 90+7'	7,624	Kettle	
20 February 2010	Yeovil Town	H	2–0	Reid 29', Mooney 54'	15,991	Graham	
23 February 2010	Brighton & Hove Albion	H	1–2	A. Sodje 90+4'	17,508	D'Urso	
26 February 2010	Southend United	A	2–1	A. Sodje 73', Reid 90+1'	9,724	Wright	
6 March 2010	Stockport County	H	2–0	Huntington 7' o.g., A. Sodje 10'	16,609	Stroud	
13 March 2010	Millwall	A	0–4		17,632	Swarbrick	
20 March 2010	Gillingham	H	2–2	Richardson 31', Mooney 60'	20,024	Taylor	
27 March 2010	Huddersfield Town	A	1–1	Reid 58'	14,459	Singh	
3 April 2010	Milton Keynes Dons	A	1–0	Forster 65' pen.	10,869	Bates	
5 April 2010	Carlisle United	H	1–0	S. Sodje 44'	17,229	Linington	
10 April 2010	Southampton	A	0–1		23,061	Hegley	
13 April 2010	Colchester United	H	1–0	Forster 21'	17,427	Jones	
17 April 2010	Norwich City	H	0–1		20,023	Hall	
24 April 2010	Exeter City	A	1–1	Reid 72'	6,835	Phillips	
1 May 2010	Leeds United	H	1–0	Naylor 88' o.g.	23,198	Probert	
8 May 2010	Oldham Athletic	A	2–0	Bailey 23', Llera 48'	5,686	Webster	

==== Play-offs ====
Win	Draw	Loss

Round	Date	Opponent	Venue	Result F–A	Scorers	Attendance	Referee	Ref.
Semi-final first leg	14 May 2010	Swindon Town	A	1–2	Burton 65'	13,560	Linington	
Semi-final second leg	17 May 2010	Swindon Town	H	2–1 (a.e.t.) (4–5 p)	Ferry 27' o.g., Mooney 45'	21,521	Swarbrick	

=== FA Cup ===
Win	Draw	Loss

Round	Date	Opponent	Venue	Result F–A	Scorers	Attendance	Referee	Ref.
First round	8 November 2009	Northwich Victoria	A	0–1		2,153	Webb	

=== League Cup ===
Win	Draw	Loss

Round	Date	Opponent	Venue	Result F–A	Scorers	Attendance	Referee	Ref.
First round	11 August 2009	Hereford United	A	0–1 (a.e.t.)		2,017	Bates	

=== Football League Trophy ===
Win	Draw	Loss

Round	Date	Opponent	Venue	Result F–A	Scorers	Attendance	Referee	Ref.
Second round	6 October 2009	Barnet	H	4–1	McLeod 15', Tuna 40', Bailey 75', Wagstaff 87'	4,522	Phillips	
Area quarter-final	11 November 2009	Southampton	A	1–2	McKenzie 90+2'	13,906	Taylor	
