= 2013–14 Millwall F.C. season =

Millwall
2013–14 season
- Chairman: John Berylson
- Manager: Steve Lomas (until 26 December); Neil Harris & Scott Fitzgerald (caretakers, 26 December–4 January); Ian Holloway (from 4 January)
- Football League Championship: 19th
- FA Cup: Third round
- League Cup: Second round
- Top goalscorer: League: Steve Morison (8); All: Martyn Woolford, Steve Morison (8)
- Highest home attendance: 16,102 vs. Charlton Athletic, 15 March 2014
- Lowest home attendance: 8,415 vs. Blackpool, 17 September 2013
- Average home league attendance: 10,581
Home colours	Away colours	Third colours

The 2013–14 Football League Championship was the 129th season in the history of Millwall Football Club. It was their 88th season in the Football League and 39th in the second tier of English football. It was Millwall's fourth continuous season in the Championship, after promotion from the Football League One in 2010.

The season marked Steve Lomas's first season in charge of Millwall, after being appointed in pre-season. The club sacked Lomas on 26 December 2013, after he won only five of his 22 games in charge. Ian Holloway was appointed as his permanent replacement on 4 January 2014.

Millwall were eliminated from the FA Cup in the third round and from the Football League Cup in the second round. The club finished the season in 19th position in the league, four points above the relegation places.

== Matches ==
=== Pre-season ===
13 July 2013	Crawley Town	0–2	Millwall	Broadfield Stadium
15:00		Report	Easter 14'; N'Guessan 72'	Attendance: 1,391

16 July 2013	Brentford	3–0	Millwall	Griffin Park
19:45	Saunders 46'; Hayes 59'; Dallas 88'	Report		Attendance: 2,039

20 July 2013	Gillingham	1–3	Millwall	Priestfield Stadium
12:30	Akinfenwa 77'	Report	Morison 7', 18'; Keogh 28'

27 July 2013 Testimonial	Millwall	1–0	Rayo Vallecano	The Den
15:00	Morison 57' (pen.)	Report		Attendance: 5,193

=== Football League Championship ===
Millwall kicked off their season at home to Yeovil Town, marking their 20th anniversary at The Den.

==== August ====
3 August 2013 1	Millwall	0–1	Yeovil Town	The Den
15:00			Upson 88'

10 August 2013 2	Ipswich Town	3–0	Millwall	Portman Road
15:00

17 August 2013 3	Millwall	0–1	Huddersfield Town	The Den
15:00

24 August 2013 4	Sheffield Wednesday	2–2	Millwall	Hillsborough
15:00	Johnson 7'; Hélan 21'		Zayatte 2' (o.g.); Keogh 87' (pen.)

31 August 2013 5	Brighton & Hove Albion	1–1	Millwall	Falmer Stadium
15:00

==== September ====
14 September 2013 6	Millwall	1–5	Derby County	The Den
15:00	Waghorn 75'	Report	9' Buxton; 45', 57', 81' Bryson; 87' Bennett	Attendance: 9,523; Referee: Keith Stroud

17 September 2013 7	Millwall	3–1	Blackpool	The Den
19:45	Trotter 45' (pen.); Bailey 73'; Morrison 74'	Report	16' Ince	Attendance: 8,415; Referee: Bratt

21 September 2013 8	Charlton Athletic	0–1	Millwall	The Valley
15:00		Report	38' McDonald	Attendance: 15,917; Referee: Andy D'Urso

28 September 2013 9	Millwall	2–0	Leeds United	The Den
15:00	Woolford 65'; Malone 76'			Attendance: 13,063; Referee: Chris Foy

==== October ====
1 October 2013 10	Birmingham City	4–0	Millwall	St Andrew's
19:45	Murphy 19', 34'; Adeyemi 68'; Lingard 89'	Report		Attendance: 13,133; Referee: Andy Woolmer

5 October 2013 11	Bournemouth	5–2	Millwall	Dean Court
15:00	Fraser 43'; Cook 50'; Arter 55'; Grabban 59' (pen.); Pitman 90' (pen.)	Report	6' Waghorn; 10' Liam Trotter	Attendance: 9,624; Referee: Lee Collins

19 October 2013 12	Millwall	2–2	Queens Park Rangers	The Den
15:00	McDonald 51'; Easter 90'		26' Kranjcar; 69' Austin	Attendance: 13,727; Referee: Mike Dean

26 October 2013 13	Reading	1–1	Millwall	Madejski Stadium
15:00	Morrison 9'	Report	Trotter 90' (pen.)	Attendance: 18,245; Referee: David Phillips

==== November ====
2 November 2013 14	Millwall	2–2	Burnley	The Den
15:00	McDonald 23'; Shittu 38'	Report	39' Vokes; 55' (o.g.) Lowry	Attendance: 10,168; Referee: Phil Gibbs

9 November 2013 15	Bolton Wanderers	3–1	Millwall	Reebok Stadium
15:00				Attendance: 14,830; Referee: Graham Stack

23 November 2013 16	Millwall	1–0	Barnsley	The Den
15:00				Attendance: 9,057

30 November 2013 17	Leicester City	3–0	Millwall	King Power Stadium
15:00				Attendance: 21,633; Referee: Andy Haines

==== December ====
3 December 2013 18	Millwall	2–2	Nottingham Forest	The Den
19:45				Attendance: 9,029; Referee: Dean Whitestone

7 December 2013 19	Millwall	2–1	Wigan Athletic	The Den
15:00				Attendance: 9,519; Referee: Scott Duncan

14 December 2013 20	Blackburn Rovers	3–2	Millwall	Ewood Park
15:00		report		Attendance: 12,642; Referee: David Webb

21 December 2013 21	Millwall	0–2	Middlesbrough	The Den
15:00		report		Attendance: 11,078; Referee: James Linington

26 December 2013 22	Watford	4–0	Millwall	Vicarage Road
13:00	Deeney 10' (pen.); Forestieri 26'; Anya 48'; McGugan 60' (pen.)	Report		Attendance: 15,471; Referee: Andy D'Urso

29 December 2013 23	Doncaster Rovers	0–0	Millwall	Keepmoat Stadium
15:00	Dean Furman (yellow card) 15'	Report	Dunne (yellow card) 90+2'	Attendance: 6,454; Referee: Kevin Wright

==== January ====
1 January 2014 24	Millwall	1–3	Leicester City	The Den
15:00 GMT	McDonald (yellow card) 15'; Chaplow 68'; Dunne (yellow card) 77'	Report	Knockaert 6'; Hammond (yellow card) 29'; Taylor-Fletcher (yellow card) 42'; Nugent 48'; Schlupp 90+3'	Attendance: 10,014; Referee: Tim Robinson

11 January 2014 25	Huddersfield Town	1–0	Millwall	John Smith's Stadium
15:00	Wells 90'	Report	Lowry (yellow card) 13'; Bailey (yellow card) 30'; Smith (yellow card) 53'	Attendance: 12,651; Referee: Paul Tierney

18 January 2014 26	Millwall	1–0	Ipswich Town	The Den
15:00	Fredericks 40'; Malone (yellow card) 45+7'	Report	Edwards (yellow card) 45+8'; Taylor (yellow card) 89'	Attendance: 12,125; Referee: Eddie Ilderton

25 January 2014	Yeovil Town	postponed	Millwall	Huish Park
15:00

28 January 2014 27	Millwall	1–1	Sheffield Wednesday	The Den
19:45	Martin (yellow card) 45'; Campbell 80'; Lowry (red card) 89'; Bywater (yellow card) 89'	Report	Coke 69' (red card) 89'; Nuhiu (yellow card) 89'	Attendance: 10,624; Referee: Lee Probert

==== February ====
1 February 2014 28	Millwall	0–3	Reading	The Den
15:00	Campbell (yellow card) 30'; Shaun Williams (yellow card) 42'	Report	Pogrebnyak 39' (yellow card) 64'; Pearce (yellow card) 62' (goal) 72'; Williams 76'	Attendance: 11,174; Referee: Darren Sheldrake

8 February 2014 29	Burnley	3–1	Millwall	Turf Moor
15:00	Ings 29', 62' (yellow card) 39'; Marney 45+2'	Report	Upson (yellow card) 25'; Woolford 27'; Robinson 88'	Attendance: 11,502; Referee: Keith Stroud

11 February 2014 30	Yeovil Town	1–1	Millwall	Huish Park
15:00	Webster (yellow card) 54'; Ralls 64' (yellow card) 90+3'	Report	Morison 75' (yellow card) 77'; Fredericks (yellow card) 86'; Williams (yellow card) 90+2'	Attendance: 4,463; Referee: Andy Woolmer

15 February 2014 31	Millwall	1–1	Bolton Wanderers	The Den
15:00	Upson (yellow card) 51'; Malone (yellow card) 64'; Shittu (yellow card) 77'; Woolford 82'	Report	Jutkiewicz 15'; Eagles (yellow card) 33'; Davies (yellow card) 79'	Attendance: 10,007; Referee: Simon Hooper

22 February 2014 32	Barnsley	1–0	Millwall	Oakwell
15:00	O'Brien 35'; Frimpong (yellow card) 87'	Report	McDonald (yellow card) 69'; Bessone (yellow card) 89'	Attendance: 9,653; Referee: Mark Brown

==== March ====
1 March 2014 33	Millwall	0–1	Brighton & Hove Albion	The Den
15:00	Shittu (yellow card) 39'	Report	David López 39' (pen.); Stephens (yellow card) 72'; Bruno (yellow card) 84'	Attendance: 12,149; Referee: Geoff Eltringham

8 March 2014 34	Derby County	0–1	Millwall	Pride Park
15:00		Report	Morison 61'; Forde (yellow card) 90+2'; Dunne (yellow card) 90+7'	Attendance: 22,853; Referee: Mike Russell

11 March 2014 35	Blackpool	1–0	Millwall	Bloomfield Road
20:00	Fuller 14'; Broadfoot (yellow card) 17'; Basham (yellow card) 34'; Goodwillie (yellow card) 46'; Halliday (yellow card) 90'	Report	Lowry (yellow card) 88'	Attendance: 12,412; Referee: Andy Madley

15 March 2014 36	Millwall	0–0	Charlton Athletic	The Den
15:00	Williams (yellow card) 43'; Dunne (yellow card) 64'; Lowry (yellow card) 80'	Report	Jackson (yellow card) 25'; Pritchard (yellow card) 36'; Sordell (yellow card) 54'	Attendance: 16,102; Referee: Phil Dowd

22 March 2014 37	Leeds United	2–1	Millwall	Elland Road
15:00	Smith 19'; McCormack 41'; Austin (yellow card) 75'; Hunt (yellow card) 90+6'	Report	Maierhofer (yellow card) 68'; Campbell 72'	Attendance: 23,211; Referee: Stuart Attwell

25 March 2014 38	Millwall	2– 3	Birmingham City	The Den
19:45	Morison 30'; Abdou (yellow card) 60'; McDonald (yellow card) 71'; Garvan (yellow card) 73'; Fredericks (yellow card) 77'; Robinson (yellow card) 85'	Report	Ibe 18'; Shinnie 34'; Reilly (yellow card) 45+1'; Žigić 52' (yellow card) 54'; Ferguson (yellow card) 90+1'	Attendance: 9,268; Referee: Scott Mathieson

29 March 2014 39	Millwall	2–2	Blackburn Rovers	The Den
15:00	Williams 57 (pen), Jackson 88 (pen)		Keane 65, King 90+3	Attendance: 8,840; Referee: James Linington

==== April ====
5 April 2014 40	Nottingham Forest	1–2	Millwall	City Ground
15:00	Paterson 53		Malone 19, Martin 39	Attendance: 20,077; Referee: Mark Brown

8 April 2014 41	Wigan Athletic	0–1	Millwall	DW Stadium
19:45			Edwards 22	Attendance: 14,124; Referee: Keith Hill

12 April 2014 42	Millwall	2–2	Watford	The Den
15:00	Morison 64, Woolford 90+5			Attendance: 10,851; Referee: Keith Stroud

19 April 2014 43	Middlesbrough	1–2	Millwall	Riverside Stadium
15:00	Maierhofer, Maierhofer		Ledesma

21 April 2014 44	Millwall	0–0	Doncaster Rovers	The Den
15:00

26 April 2014 45	QPR	1–1	Millwall	Loftus Road
15:00	Austin, 78 (pen)		Malone, 90+1	Referee: Kevin Friend

==== May ====
3 May 2014 46	Millwall	1–0	Bournemouth	The Den
15:00	Woolford,28

=== FA Cup ===
Millwall entered the FA Cup at the third round stage with other Championship and Premier League clubs. The draw was made in December 2013 with the ties taking place on 4 January 2014. Millwall were drawn against Southend United, to whom they lost 4–1.

4 January 2014	Southend United (4)	4–1	Millwall (2)	Roots Hall, Southend-on-Sea
15:00 GMT	Corr 22'; Atkinson 45+6'; Timlin 56'; Leonard 90+5'	Report	Woolford 64'	Attendance: 7,923; Referee: James Adcock

=== Football League Cup ===
Millwall played their second competitive South London derby against AFC Wimbledon in the first round of the Football League Cup.

5 August 2013 1st round	Millwall	2–1	AFC Wimbledon	The Den
19:45	Keogh 51'; Woolford 78'	Report	Moore 89'	Attendance: 4,443

27 August 2013 2nd round	Nottingham Forest	2–1	Millwall	City Ground

== League table ==
Pos	Team	Pld	W	D	L	GF	GA	GD	Pts
17	Huddersfield Town	46	14	11	21	58	65	−7	53
18	Charlton Athletic	46	13	12	21	41	61	−20	51
19	Millwall	46	11	15	20	46	74	−28	48
20	Blackpool	46	11	13	22	38	66	−28	46
21	Birmingham City	46	11	11	24	58	74	−16	44

Source: BBC Sport
Rules for classification: 1) points; 2) goal difference; 3) number of goals scored

=== Results summary ===
Overall								Home						Away					
Pld	W	D	L	GF	GA	GD	Pts	W	D	L	GF	GA	GD	W	D	L	GF	GA	GD
38	7	11	20	35	67	−32	32	4	5	7	21	29	−8	3	6	13	14	38	−24

Last updated: 25 March 2014.
Source: Championship

=== Result round by round ===
Round	1	2	3	4	5	6	7	8	9	10	11	12	13	14	15	16	17	18	19	20	21	22	23	24	25	26	27	28	29	30	31	32	33	34	35	36	37	38	39	40	41	42	43	44	45	46
Ground	H	A	H	A	A	H	H	A	H	A	A	H	A	H	A	H	A	A	A	A	A	A	A	H	A	H	A	H	A	A	H	A	H	A	A	H	A	H	A	A	A	H	A	H	A	H
Result	L	L	L	D	D	L	W	W	W	L	L	D	D	D	L	W	L	D	W	L	L	L	D	L	L	W	D	L	L	D	D	L	L	W	L	D	L	L	D	W	W	D	W	D	D	W
Position	22	23	24	23	23	24	19	17	16	16	18	18	18	18	20	18	20	20	17	18	19	20	20	21	21	20	21	21	21	21	21	21	22	21	21	22	23	24	24	23	21	21	20	20	20	19

Updated to match(es) played on 25 March 2014. Source: BBC Sport
A = Away; H = Home; W = Win; D = Draw; L = Loss

== Kit ==
For this season, Millwall chose Prostate Cancer UK to sponsor their shirt for free.

Supplier: Macron
Sponsor(s): Prostate Cancer UK

Last updated: 26 June 2013.
Source: Millwall FC

== Squad statistics ==
=== Appearances and goals ===
As of 3 May 2014

No.	Pos	Nat	Player	Total		Championship		FA Cup		League Cup	
No.	Pos	Nat	Player	Apps	Goals	Apps	Goals	Apps	Goals	Apps	Goals
1	GK	(Republic of Ireland) IRL	David Forde	41	0	40	0	1	0	0	0
2	DF	(Republic of Ireland) IRL	Alan Dunne	30	0	28+1	0	1	0	0	0
3	DF	(Nigeria) NGA	Danny Shittu	23	1	22	1	1	0	0	0
4	MF	(England) ENG	Josh Wright	4	0	2+1	0	0	0	0+1	0
5	DF	(England) ENG	Paul Robinson	27	0	20+5	0	0	0	2	0
6	MF	(England) ENG	Liam Trotter	19	3	16+3	3	0	0	0	0
7	MF	(England) ENG	Liam Feeney	18	1	5+12	0	0	0	1	1
8	FW	(Wales) WAL	Jermaine Easter	22	3	6+14	3	1	0	1	0
9	FW	(Wales) WAL	Steve Morison (on loan from Leeds United)	42	8	25+16	8	1	0	0	0
10	MF	(England) ENG	Nicky Bailey	31	1	26+2	1	1	0	2	0
11	MF	(England) ENG	Martyn Woolford	43	9	38+2	7	0+1	1	2	1
12	DF	(Australia) AUS	Shane Lowry	23	0	21+1	0	1	0	0	0
13	MF	(England) ENG	Lee Martin	29	1	16+10	1	1	0	1+1	0
14	MF	(England) ENG	Ryan Fredericks (on loan from Tottenham Hotspur)	14	1	11+3	1	0	0	0	0
15	MF	(England) ENG	Ed Upson	10	0	10	0	0	0	0	0
16	DF	(England) ENG	Mark Beevers	30	0	27+1	0	0	0	2	0
17	DF	(Republic of Ireland) IRL	Shaun Williams	17	1	15+2	1	0	0	0	0
18	MF	(England) ENG	Richard Chaplow	21	1	12+7	1	1	0	0+1	0
19	FW	(Canada) CAN	Simeon Jackson	14	2	3+11	2	0	0	0	0
20	FW	(Republic of Ireland) IRL	Andy Keogh	17	2	6+9	1	0	0	1+1	1
21	DF	(England) ENG	Jack Smith	9	0	3+3	0	1	0	2	0
22	FW	(England) ENG	DJ Campbell (on loan from Blackburn Rovers)	9	2	6+3	2	0	0	0	0
25	DF	(Trinidad and Tobago) TRI	Justin Hoyte (on loan from Middlesbrough)	5	0	4+1	0	0	0	0	0
26	MF	(Comoros) COM	Jimmy Abdou	27	0	21+3	0	1	0	2	0
27	FW	(Australia) AUS	Scott McDonald	34	3	21+11	3	0	0	1+1	0
28	DF	(England) ENG	Scott Malone	35	3	32+1	3	0	0	2	0
29	MF	(Wales) WAL	Owen Garvan (on loan from Crystal Palace)	13	0	13	0	0	0	0	0
31	DF	(Argentina) ARG	Federico Bessone	2	0	1+1	0	0	0	0	0
32	FW	(England) ENG	Josh Marquis	4	0	1+1	0	0+1	0	0+1	0
34	MF	(Nigeria) NGA	Fred Onyedinma	5	0	3+1	0	0+1	0	0	0
42	FW	(Austria) AUT	Stefan Maierhofer	11	2	7+4	2	0	0	0	0
43	GK	(England) ENG	Stephen Bywater	9	0	6+1	0	0	0	2	0
44	MF	(Trinidad and Tobago) TRI	Carlos Edwards	8	1	8	1	0	0	0	0
Players who featured for club, who have left:
14	MF	(England) ENG	James Henry	6	0	4+1	0	0	0	1	0
15	FW	(France) FRA	Dany N'Guessan	1	0	0+1	0	0	0	0	0
15	DF	(England) ENG	Paul Connolly	4	0	3+1	0	0	0	0	0
17	MF	(France) FRA	Guy Moussi (on loan from Nottingham Forest)	3	0	3	0	0	0	0	0
17	MF	(England) ENG	Shaun Derry (on loan from Queens Park Rangers)	7	0	7	0	0	0	0	0
22	DF	(England) ENG	Karleigh Osborne	1	0	1	0	0	0	0	0
29	FW	(England) ENG	Martyn Waghorn (on loan from Leicester City)	14	3	13+1	3	0	0	0	0

=== Top scorers ===
As of 3 May 2014

Place	Position	Nationality	Number	Name	Championship	FA Cup	League Cup	Total
1	MF	(England)	11	Martyn Woolford	7	1	1	9
2	FW	(Wales)	9	Steve Morison	8	0	0	8
3	MF	(England)	6	Liam Trotter	3	0	0	3
3	FW	(Wales)	8	Jermaine Easter	3	0	0	3
3	FW	(Australia)	27	Scott McDonald	3	0	0	3
3	DF	(England)	28	Scott Malone	3	0	0	3
3	FW	(England)	29	Martyn Waghorn	3	0	0	3
8	FW	(Canada)	19	Simeon Jackson	2	0	0	2
8	FW	(Republic of Ireland)	20	Andy Keogh	1	0	1	2
8	FW	(England)	22	DJ Campbell	2	0	0	2
8	FW	(Austria)	43	Stefan Maierhofer	2	0	0	2
12	DF	(Nigeria)	3	Danny Shittu	1	0	0	1
12	MF	(England)	7	Liam Feeney	0	0	1	1
12	MF	(England)	10	Nicky Bailey	1	0	0	1
12	MF	(England)	13	Lee Martin	1	0	0	1
12	MF	(England)	14	Ryan Fredericks	1	0	0	1
12	MF	(Republic of Ireland)	17	Shaun Williams	1	0	0	1
12	MF	(England)	18	Richard Chaplow	1	0	0	1
12	MF	(Trinidad and Tobago)	44	Carlos Edwards	1	0	0	1
Own Goals					2	0	0	2
Total					46	1	3	50

=== Disciplinary record ===
As of 3 May 2014

Number	Nationality	Position	Name	Championship		FA Cup		League Cup		Total	
Number	Nationality	Position	Name	Booked	Sent off (straight red)	Booked	Sent off (straight red)	Booked	Sent off (straight red)	Booked	Sent off (straight red)
1	(Republic of Ireland)	GK	David Forde	4	0	0	0	0	0	4	0
2	(Republic of Ireland)	DF	Alan Dunne	4	2	0	0	0	0	4	2
3	(Nigeria)	DF	Danny Shittu	5	1	0	0	0	0	5	1
5	(England)	DF	Paul Robinson	3	0	0	0	0	0	3	0
7	(England)	MF	Liam Feeney	1	0	0	0	0	0	1	0
8	(Wales)	FW	Jermaine Easter	0	0	0	1	0	0	0	1
9	(Wales)	FW	Steve Morison	5	0	0	0	0	0	5	0
10	(England)	MF	Nicky Bailey	8	0	1	0	0	0	9	0
11	(England)	MF	Martyn Woolford	2	0	1	0	0	0	3	0
12	(Australia)	DF	Shane Lowry	4	2	0	0	0	0	4	2
13	(England)	MF	Lee Martin	5	0	0	0	0	0	5	0
14	(England)	MF	Fredericks	2	0	0	0	0	0	2	0
~~15~~	(France)	FW	Dany N'Guessan	1	0	0	0	0	0	1	0
15	(England)	MF	Ed Upson	3	0	0	0	0	0	3	0
16	(England)	DF	Mark Beevers	4	0	0	0	0	0	4	0
~~17~~	(England)	MF	Shaun Derry	2	0	0	0	0	0	2	0
17	(Republic of Ireland)	DF	Shaun Williams	3	0	0	0	0	0	3	0
18	(England)	MF	Richard Chaplow	2	0	0	0	0	0	2	0
20	(Republic of Ireland)	FW	Andy Keogh	1	0	0	0	0	0	1	0
21	(England)	DF	Jack Smith	1	0	1	0	0	0	2	0
22	(England)	FW	DJ Campbell	1	0	0	0	0	0	1	0
26	(Comoros)	MF	Jimmy Abdou	2	1	0	0	1	0	3	1
27	(Australia)	FW	Scott McDonald	7	0	0	0	0	0	7	0
28	(England)	DF	Scott Malone	6	0	0	0	0	0	6	0
~~29~~	(England)	FW	Martyn Waghorn	1	0	0	0	0	0	1	0
29	(Wales)	MF	Owen Garvan	1	0	0	0	0	0	1	0
31	(Argentina)	DF	Federico Bessone	1	0	0	0	0	0	1	0
42	(Austria)	FW	Stefan Maierhofer	3	0	0	0	0	0	3	0
43	(England)	GK	Stephen Bywater	1	0	0	0	0	0	1	0
Total				83	6	3	1	1	0	87	7

== Squad ==
As of start of the season

No.	Name	Position (s)	Nationality	Place of Birth	Date of Birth (Age)	Club caps	Club goals	Int. caps	Int. goals	Date signed	Signed from	Fee	Contract End
Goalkeepers
1	David Forde	GK	(Republic of Ireland)	Galway	20 December 1979 (age 46)	237	0	10	0	5 June 2008	Cardiff City	Free	30 June 2014
43	Stephen Bywater	GK	(England)	Oldham	7 June 1981 (age 45)	–	–	–	–	24 June 2013	Sheffield Wednesday	Free	30 June 2015
Defenders
2	Alan Dunne	RB/RM	(Republic of Ireland)	Dublin	23 August 1982 (age 44)	314	21	–	–	1 June 2000	Academy	Trainee	30 June 2014
3	Danny Shittu	CB	(Nigeria)	Lagos	2 September 1980 (age 46)	43	1	28	0	13 August 2012	Queens Park Rangers	Free	30 June 2015
5	Paul Robinson	CB	(England)	London	7 January 1982 (age 44)	336	23	–	–	1 August 2001	Academy	Trainee	30 June 2015
12	Shane Lowry	CB/LB	(Australia)	Perth	12 June 1989 (age 37)	67	2	–	–	27 January 2012	Aston Villa	£238,000	30 June 2014
15	Paul Connolly	RB/CB	(England)	Liverpool	29 September 1983 (age 42)	–	–	–	–	12 September 2013	Leeds United	Free	January 2014
16	Mark Beevers	CB	(England)	Barnsley	21 November 1989 (age 36)	39	1	–	–	1 January 2013	Sheffield Wednesday	Undisclosed	30 June 2015
21	Jack Smith	RB/CB/LB	(England)	Hemel Hempstead	14 October 1983 (age 42)	113	2	–	–	2 August 2009	Swindon Town	Free	30 June 2014
22	Karleigh Osborne	CB/RB	(England)	Southall	19 March 1988 (age 38)	14	3	–	–	13 July 2013	Brentford	Free	30 June 2014
23	Thomas Bender	CB/LB	(Wales)	Harlow (England)	19 January 1993 (age 33)	0	0	–	–	27 March 2013	Free agent	Free	30 June 2014
24	Jake Goodman	CB/LB	(England)		5 August 1993 (age 33)	0	0	–	–	1 July 2011	Academy	Trainee	30 June 2014
28	Scott Malone	LB/LM	(England)	Rowley Regis	25 March 1991 (age 35)	16	1	–	–	30 May 2012	Bournemouth	£750,000	30 June 2015
Midfielders
4	Josh Wright	CM	(England)	London	6 November 1989 (age 36)	47	1	–	–	15 November 2011	Free agent	Free	30 June 2015
6	Liam Trotter	CM/AM	(England)	Ipswich	24 August 1988 (age 38)	140	21	–	–	24 June 2010	Ipswich Town	Free	30 June 2014
7	Liam Feeney	LM/RM	(England)	London	28 April 1986 (age 40)	65	7	–	–	31 August 2011	Bournemouth	£200,000	30 June 2014
10	Nicky Bailey	CM	(England)	Putney	10 June 1984 (age 42)	–	–	–	–	19 July 2013	Middlesbrough	Free	30 June 2015
11	Martyn Woolford	LW	(England)	Pontefract	13 October 1985 (age 40)	15	1	–	–	9 January 2013	Bristol City	Undisclosed	30 June 2015
13	Lee Martin	LM/RM/AM	(England)	Taunton	9 February 1987 (age 39)	–	–	–	–	3 July 2013	Ipswich Town	Free	30 June 2014
14	James Henry	RM/AM/LM	(England)	Reading	10 June 1989 (age 37)	158	19	–	–	28 July 2010	Reading	£210,000	30 June 2014
17	Shaun Derry	CM/DM	(England)	Nottingham	6 December 1977 (age 48)	–	–	–	–	8 August 2013	Queens Park Rangers	Loan	1 January 2014
18	Richard Chaplow	CM/DM/RM	(England)	Accrington	2 February 1985 (age 41)	4	0	–	–	15 July 2013	Southampton	Free	30 June 2015
26	Jimmy Abdou	DM	(Comoros)	Martigues (France)	13 July 1984 (age 42)	221	6	1	0	3 July 2008	Plymouth Argyle	Free	30 June 2015
	Fred Onyedinma	AM	(Nigeria)			–	–	–	–	1 July 2013	Academy	Trainee	Undisclosed
Forwards
8	Jermaine Easter	CF	(Wales)	Cardiff	15 January 1982 (age 44)	7	1	10	0	28 May 2013	Crystal Palace	Free	30 June 2014
9	Steve Morison	CF	(Wales)	Enfield (England)	29 August 1983 (age 43)	95	40	20	1	28 June 2013	Leeds United	Loan	31 May 2014
15	Dany N'Guessan	LW/CF/RW	(France)	Ivry-sur-Seine	11 August 1987 (age 39)	41	5	–	–	31 August 2011	Leicester City	Free	30 June 2014
20	Andy Keogh	CF/RW	(Republic of Ireland)	Dublin	16 May 1986 (age 40)	59	16	29	2	31 January 2012	Wolverhampton Wanderers	£250,000	30 June 2014
27	Scott McDonald	CF	(Australia)	Melbourne	21 August 1983 (age 43)	0	0	26	0	23 July 2013	Middlesbrough	Free	30 June 2015
29	Martyn Waghorn	CF	(England)	South Shields	23 January 1990 (age 36)	–	–	–	–	12 September 2013	Leicester City	Loan	December 2013
30	Aiden O'Brien	CF	(Republic of Ireland)	Islington (England)	4 October 1993 (age 32)	1	0	–	–	4 October 2010	Academy	Trainee	30 June 2014
32	John Marquis	CF	(England)	London	16 May 1992 (age 34)	46	6	–	–	1 August 2009	Academy	Trainee	30 June 2014
39	Charlie Penny	CF	(England)	London	(age 18)	0	0	–	–	1 July 2013	Academy	Trainee	30 June 2014

== Transfers ==
All transfers updated as of 5 November 2013

=== In ===
No.	Pos.	Nat.	Name	Age	EU	Moving from	Type	Transfer window	Ends	Transfer fee	Source
8	FW	(Wales)	Jermaine Easter	31	EU	Crystal Palace	Free Transfer	Summer	2014	Free	BBC Sport
39	FW	(England)	Charlie Penny	18	EU	Youth system	Promoted	Summer	2014	Youth system	BBC Sport
43	GK	(England)	Stephen Bywater	32	EU	Sheffield Wednesday	Free Transfer	Summer	2015	Free	Millwall FC
	MF	(Nigeria)	Fred Onyedinma	17		Youth system	Promoted	Summer	Undisclosed	Youth system	Millwall FC
9	FW	(Wales) (England)	Steve Morison	29	EU	Leeds United	Loan	Summer	2014	Season Long Loan	BBC Sport
13	MF	(England)	Lee Martin	26	EU	Ipswich Town	Free Transfer	Summer	2014	Free	Millwall FC
18	MF	(England)	Richard Chaplow	28	EU	Southampton	Free Transfer	Summer	2015	Free	Millwall FC
10	MF	(England)	Nicky Bailey	29	EU	Middlesbrough	Free Transfer	Summer	2015	Free	Millwall FC
27	FW	(Australia)	Scott McDonald	29		Middlesbrough	Free Transfer	Summer	2015	Free	BBC Sport
15	DF	(England)	Paul Connolly	29	EU	Leeds United	Free Transfer		2014	Free	BBC Sport

- Total spending: ▼ ~ £0

=== Loans in ===
No.	Pos.	Name	Country	Age	Loan club	Started	Ended	Start source	End source
17	MF	Shaun Derry	(England)	48	Queens Park Rangers	8 August	1 January	BBC Sport	BBC Sport
29	FW	Martyn Waghorn	(England)	36	Leicester City	12 September		BBC Sport	
25	DF	Justin Hoyte	(Trinidad and Tobago) (England)	41	Middlesbrough	5 November	1 January	BBC Sport	

Sources: For loan start source see "Start source". For loan end source see "End source".
EU = if holds or not a European Union passport; Country: when 2 flags, 1st flag = country that plays for internationally, 2nd flag = country of birth; No. = number on jersey; P = Position (for position name, pause mouse pointer on abbreviation); Name = Name on jersey (for more extensive name, pause mouse pointer on name); In/Out = In: The player came in on loan, Out: The player went out on loan; Loan club = the club that the player moved on loan to or the club that the player came from on loan; Started = the date when the player's loan started; Ended = the date when the player's loan ended.

=== Out ===
No.	Pos.	Name	Country	Age	Type	Moving to	Transfer window	Transfer fee	Apps	Goals	Source
19	MF	Chris Taylor	(England)	26	Contract ended	Blackburn Rovers	Summer	Free	25	3	BBC Sport
23	GK	Steve Mildenhall	(England)	35	Contract Ended	Bristol Rovers	Summer	Free	15	0	BBC Sport
17	DF	Tamika Mkandawire	(England) (Malawi)	30	Contract ended	Shrewsbury Town	Summer	Free	53	2	BBC Sport
33	GK	Maik Taylor	(Northern Ireland) (Germany)	41	Contract ended	Retired	Summer	N/A	17	0	Belfast Telegraph
8	MF	Therry Racon	(France)	29	Contract ended	Free agent	Summer	Free	2	0	The Telegraph
11	FW	Shaun Batt	(England)	26	Contract ended	Leyton Orient		Free	41	5	BBC Sport
15	FW	Dany N'Guessan	(France)	26	Contract terminated	Swindon Town	Summer	Free	38	5	BBC Sport
31	GK	Arran Lee-Barrett	(England)	29	Contract ended	Bolton Wanderers	Summer	Free	0	0	BBC Sport

EU = if holds or not a European Union passport; Country: when 2 flags, 1st flag = country that plays for internationally, 2nd flag = country of birth; N = number on jersey; P = Position (for position name, pause mouse pointer on abbreviation); Name = Name on jersey (for more extensive name, pause mouse pointer on name); Age = age on the day of the signing; Moving from = only indicate the club the player was playing before start playing for this club in this season, for the type of the moving see Status column; Moving to = only indicates the club the player is going to play next, for the type of the moving see Status column; Ends = when the player's current contract ends; n/a = Not applicable; Apps = Total number of competitive appearances (including substitute appearances) at the club prior to departure; Goals = Total number of competitive goals scored at the club prior to departure.

=== Loans out ===
No.	Pos.	Name	Country	Age	Loan club	Started	Ended	Start source	End source
24	DF	Jake Goodman	(England)	33	Aldershot Town	9 August	5 January	BBC Sport	
32	FW	John Marquis	(England)	34	Portsmouth	19 September		BBC Sport	
7	MF	Liam Feeney	(England)	27	Bolton Wanderers	27 September	24 October	BBC Sport	BBC Sport
14	MF	James Henry	(England)	37	Wolverhampton Wanderers	1 October		BBC Sport	
22	DF	Karleigh Osborne	(England)	38	Bristol City	31 October	1 December	BBC Sport	

Sources: For loan start source see "Start source". For loan end source see "End source".
EU = if holds or not a European Union passport; Country: when 2 flags, 1st flag = country that plays for internationally, 2nd flag = country of birth; No. = number on jersey; P = Position (for position name, pause mouse pointer on abbreviation); Name = Name on jersey (for more extensive name, pause mouse pointer on name); In/Out = In: The player came in on loan, Out: The player went out on loan; Loan club = the club that the player moved on loan to or the club that the player came from on loan; Started = the date when the player's loan started; Ended = the date when the player's loan ended.

=== Contracts ===
No.	Pos.	Nat.	Name	Age	Status	Contract length	Expiry date	Source
3	DF	(Nigeria)	Danny Shittu	32	Signed	2 years	July 2015	BBC Sport
19	MF	(England)	Chris Taylor	26	Rejected	2 years	June 2015	givemefootball
24	DF	(England)	Jake Goodman	19	Signed	1 year	July 2014	Millwall Official Site
