= 2014–15 AFC Wimbledon season =

AFC Wimbledon
2014–15 season
- Chairman: Erik Samuelson
- Manager: Neal Ardley
- League Two: 15th
- Football League Cup: First Round (knocked out by MK Dons)
- FA Cup: Third Round (knocked out by Liverpool)
- Football League Trophy: Third Round (knocked out by Bristol City)
- Top goalscorer: League: Adebayo Akinfenwa 13; All: Adebayo Akinfenwa 15
- Highest home attendance: 4,417 vs Exeter City (28 December 2014)
- Lowest home attendance: 3,195 vs Burton Albion (16 September 2014)
- Average home league attendance: 4,073
Home colours	Away colours	Third colours

The 2014–2015 season was AFC Wimbledon's thirteenth season since formation in 2002 and the club's fourth consecutive season in Football League Two.

== League table ==
Pos	Team	Pld	W	D	L	GF	GA	GD	Pts
13	Oxford United	46	15	16	15	50	49	+1	61
14	Dagenham & Redbridge	46	17	8	21	58	59	−1	59
15	AFC Wimbledon	46	14	16	16	54	60	−6	58
16	Portsmouth	46	14	15	17	52	54	−2	57
17	Accrington Stanley	46	15	11	20	58	77	−19	56

Updated to match(es) played on 23 May 2015. Source: BBC Sport
Rules for classification: 1) Points; 2) Goal difference; 3) Number of goals scored

== Results summary ==
Round	1	2	3	4	5	6	7	8	9	10	11	12	13	14	15	16	17	18	19	20	21	22	23	24	25	26	27	28	29	30	31	32	33	34	35	36	37	38	39	40	41	42	43	44	45	46
Ground	H	A	A	H	H	A	A	H	H	A	A	H	A	H	H	A	H	A	H	A	H	A	H	A	H	H	A	H	A	A	H	A	A	H	H	A	A	H	A	H	A	H	A	H	A	H
Result	D	W	W	L	L	D	L	W	W	L	D	W	L	D	D	L	W	D	L	W	L	W	W	L	L	W	D	W	D	L	W	D	L	D	W	L	L	W	D	D	L	D	D	D	L	D
Position	10	7	5	7	13	13	15	12	10	12	13	10	13	12	12	17	14	16	16	13	15	12	11	12	13	12	13	12	11	13	12	10	11	11	11	12	13	12	12	12	13	13	13	13	15	15

Updated to match(es) played on 12 May 2015. Source: BBC Sport
A = Away; H = Home; W = Win; D = Draw; L = Loss

Overall								Home						Away					
Pld	W	D	L	GF	GA	GD	Pts	W	D	L	GF	GA	GD	W	D	L	GF	GA	GD
46	14	16	16	54	60	−6	58	9	8	6	34	25	+9	5	8	10	20	35	−15

Last updated: 12 May 2015.
Source: BBC Sport

== Match results ==
=== Pre-season friendlies ===
12 July 2014	Margate	3–0	AFC Wimbledon	Hartsdown Park
15:00 BST	Rents 41'; Johnson 45'; Moore 53'	Report		Attendance: 747

19 July 2014	AFC Wimbledon	2–3	Chelsea	Kingsmeadow
15:00 BST	Bennett 1'; Tubbs 40' (pen.)	Report	Terry 74', 90'; Salah 83'	Attendance: 4,634; Referee: Lee Collins

22 July 2014	AFC Wimbledon	2–1	Sutton United	Kingsmeadow
19:45 BST	Azeez 19'; Jacquart 82'	Report	Haysman 41'	Attendance: 657

26 July 2014	Woking	1–3	AFC Wimbledon	Kingfield Stadium
15:00 BST	Rendell 63'	Report	Tubbs 16'; Rigg 45'; Arthur 87'	Attendance: 960

1 August 2014	Havant & Waterlooville	1–0	AFC Wimbledon	West Leigh Park
BST	Bubb 51'	Report

2 August 2014	Aldershot Town	0–3	AFC Wimbledon	Recreation Ground
15:00 BST		Report	Pell 46'; Sainte-Luce 67'; Rigg 74'

=== League Two 2014–15 ===
==== August ====
9 August 2014 Game 1	AFC Wimbledon	2–2	Shrewsbury Town	Kingsmeadow
15:00 BST	Tubbs 26'; Rigg (yellow card) 45+1' (goal) 74'; Bulman (yellow card) 66'; Fuller (yellow card) 90+3'	Report	Collins 9' 84'; Wesolowski (yellow card) 58'; Knight-Percival (yellow card) 68'	Attendance: 4,162; Referee: Keith Hill

16 August 2014 Game 2	Luton Town	0–1	AFC Wimbledon	Kenilworth Road
15:00 BST	Griffiths (yellow card) 72'	Report	Tubbs 42'; Pell (yellow card) 82'	Attendance: 9,101; Referee: Oliver Langford

19 August 2014 Game 3	Southend United	0–1	AFC Wimbledon	Roots Hall
19:45 BST	Bolger (yellow card) 81'	Report	Francomb (yellow card) 49' (goal) 60'; Kennedy (yellow card) 76'; Rigg (yellow card) 90+4'	Attendance: 5,364; Referee: Lee Collins

23 August 2014 Game 4	AFC Wimbledon	1–2	Hartlepool United	Kingsmeadow
15:00 BST	Tubbs 11'; Pell (yellow card) 66'	Report	Wyke 46'; Harewood 68'	Attendance: 3,576; Referee: Brendan Malone

30 August 2014 Game 5	AFC Wimbledon	2–3	Stevenage	Kingsmeadow
15:00 BST	Tubbs 34'; Bulman (yellow card) 42'; Barrett (yellow card) 68'; Azeez 90+7'	Report	Wells 42'; Lancaster 59'; Pett (yellow card) 65'; Lee 74'; Walton (yellow card) 82'	Attendance: 3,791; Referee: Darren Handley

==== September ====
6 September 2014 Game 6	Carlisle United	4–4	AFC Wimbledon	Brunton Park
15:00 BST	Dempsey 13' 45+3'; O'Hanlon (yellow card) 41'; Gillies 52'; Potts 70'; Dicker (red card) 81'	Report	Rigg 4'; Tubbs 22' 81' (pen.); Bennett (yellow card) 42'; Nicholson (yellow card) 64'; Azeez 90+3'	Attendance: 3,955; Referee: Andy Haines

13 September 2014 Game 7	Accrington Stanley	1–0	AFC Wimbledon	Crown Ground
15:00 BST	Procter (yellow card) 55'; Gray 83'	Report	Rigg (yellow card) 9'	Attendance: 1,238; Referee: Peter Bankes

16 September 2014 Game 8	AFC Wimbledon	3–0	Burton Albion	Kingsmeadow
19:45 BST	Tubbs 21' (yellow card) 49' (yellow card) 82' (red card); Akinfenwa 37' 67' (yellow card) 69'; Bennett (yellow card) 61'; Harrison (yellow card) 90+3'	Report		Attendance: 3,195; Referee: Andy Davies

20 September 2014 Game 9	AFC Wimbledon	1–0	Morecambe	Kingsmeadow
15:00 BST	Akinfenwa 27'	Report		Attendance: 3,822; Referee: Darren Drysdale

27 September 2014 Game 10	Newport County	4–1	AFC Wimbledon	Rodney Parade
15:00 BST	Yakubu 18'; Sandell (yellow card) 24'; Pigott 46' 65' (yellow card) 87'; Willmott (yellow card) 54'; O'Connor 90+1'	Report	Barrett (yellow card) 8'; Akinfenwa 70' (yellow card) 90+3'; Bennett (yellow card) 73'	Attendance: 2,804; Referee: Darren Deadman

==== October ====
4 October 2014 Game 11	Cheltenham Town	1–1	AFC Wimbledon	Whaddon Road
15:00 BST	Taylor 8'	Report	Barrett 41'	Attendance: 2,795; Referee: Chris Kavanagh

11 October 2014 Game 12	AFC Wimbledon	3–2	Bury	Kingsmeadow
15:00 BST	Akinfenwa 26' 37'; Tubbs 54'; Bulman (yellow card) 61'; Fuller (yellow card) 73'; Moore (yellow card) 87'	Report	Mayor 49'; Lowe 73' (pen.); Soares (yellow card) 82'; Cameron (yellow card) 88'	Attendance: 4,268; Referee: Gavin Ward

18 October 2014 Game 13	Wycombe Wanderers	2–0	AFC Wimbledon	Adams Park
15:00 BST	Jacobson (yellow card) 32'; Murphy (yellow card) 44'; Scowen 51'; Wood 70'; Jombati (yellow card) 89'	Report	Akinfenwa (yellow card) 29'; Rigg (yellow card) 32'; Tubbs (yellow card) 37'	Attendance: 4,329; Referee: Richard Clark

21 October 2014 Game 14	AFC Wimbledon	0–0	Plymouth Argyle	Kingsmeadow
19:45 BST		Report	Nelson (yellow card) 55'; Reid (yellow card) 71'	Attendance: 4,318; Referee: Graham Horwood

25 October 2014 Game 15	AFC Wimbledon	2–2	Tranmere Rovers	Kingsmeadow
15:00 BST	Smith 16'; Akinfenwa 44'	Report	Gnanduillet 20' 65'	Attendance: 4,195; Referee: Andy D'Urso

==== November ====
1 November 2014 Game 16	Northampton Town	2–0	AFC Wimbledon	Sixfields Stadium
15:00 GMT	Mohamed 32'; Nicholls 90+4'	Report		Attendance: 4,548; Referee: James Linington

15 November 2014 Game 17	AFC Wimbledon	1–0	Dagenham & Redbridge	Kingsmeadow
15:00 GMT	Fuller 19' (yellow card) 89'	Report	Hemmings (yellow card) 56'	Attendance: 3,887; Referee: Brendan Malone

22 November 2014 Game 18	Oxford United	0–0	AFC Wimbledon	Kassam Stadium
15:00 GMT	Whing (yellow card) 79'	Report	Sutherland (yellow card) 21'	Attendance: 5,443; Referee: Trevor Kettle

29 November 2014 Game 19	AFC Wimbledon	1–2	Cambridge United	Kingsmeadow
15:00 GMT	Tubbs 2'; Bulman (yellow card) 85'	Report	Appiah 12'; Hughes 58'	Attendance: 4,306; Referee: Michael Bull

==== December ====
13 December 2014 Game 20	York City	2–3	AFC Wimbledon	Bootham Crescent
15:00 GMT	De Girolamo 55'; Zubar 75'	Report	Goodman 24'; Rigg 62'; Tubbs 64'	Attendance: 3,245; Referee: Carl Boyeson

20 December 2014 Game 21	AFC Wimbledon	0–1	Mansfield Town	Kingsmeadow
15:00 GMT	Rigg (yellow card) 57'; Goodman (yellow card) 79'	Report	Taylor (red card) 34'; Tafazolli (yellow card) 40'; Oliver (yellow card) 45+7' (goal) 47'; Brown (yellow card) 58'; Freeman (yellow card) 87'	Attendance: 3,790; Referee: Darren Deadman

26 December 2014 Game 22	Portsmouth	0–2	AFC Wimbledon	Fratton Park
15:00 GMT	Butler (yellow card) 16' (yellow card) 69' (red card); Robinson (yellow card) 39'; Westcarr (yellow card) 90'	Report	Sutherland 9'; Tubbs 17'; Bulman (yellow card) 84'	Attendance: 17,558; Referee: Charles Breakspear

28 December 2014 Game 23	AFC Wimbledon	4–1	Exeter City	Kingsmeadow
15:00 GMT	Tubbs 9'; Fuller (yellow card) 18'; Azeez 48' 71'; Akinfenwa 86'	Report	Sercombe 90+3'	Attendance: 4,417; Referee: Tim Robinson

==== January ====
10 January 2015 Game 24	Stevenage	2–1	AFC Wimbledon	Broadhall Way
15:00 GMT	Pett 32'; Walton 69' (pen.)	Report	Oshilaja (yellow card) 18'; Francomb 35'; Fuller (yellow card) 75'	Attendance: 3,306; Referee: Graham Horwood

17 January 2015 Game 25	AFC Wimbledon	1–3	Carlisle United	Kingsmeadow
15:00 GMT	Akinfenwa 1'	Report	O'Hanlon 16'; Rigg 56'; Grainger (yellow card) 71'; Young (yellow card) 87'; Amoo 90+4'	Attendance: 4,186; Referee: Mike Bull

24 January 2015 Game 26	AFC Wimbledon	2–1	Accrington Stanley	Kingsmeadow
15:00 GMT	Rigg 37'; Azeez 78'	Report	Buxton 88'	Attendance: 3,859; Referee: Darren England

31 January 2015 Game 27	Morecambe	1–1	AFC Wimbledon	Globe Arena
15:00 GMT	Reeves 12'	Report	Amond 12'; Redshaw (yellow card) 79'	Attendance: 1,841; Referee: Pat Miller

==== February ====
7 February 2015 Game 28	AFC Wimbledon	2–0	Newport County	Kingsmeadow
15:00 GMT	Akinfenwa 11' 72'	Report	Porter (yellow card) 45+3'; Feely (red card) 56'; Jones (yellow card) 70'	Attendance: 3,817; Referee: Dean Whitestone

10 February 2015 Game 29	Burton Albion	0–0	AFC Wimbledon	Pirelli Stadium
19:45 GMT	Mousinho (yellow card) 90+6'	Report	Phillips (red card) 65'; Akinfenwa (yellow card) 76'	Attendance: 2,399; Referee: Seb Stockbridge

14 February 2015 Game 30	Shrewsbury Town	2–0	AFC Wimbledon	New Meadow
15:00 GMT	Ellis (yellow card) 43'; Lawrence 45+2'; Vernon 49'	Report	Azeez (yellow card) 2'; Winfield (yellow card) 85'	Attendance: 4,992; Referee: Andy Haines

21 February 2015 Game 31	AFC Wimbledon	3–2	Luton Town	Kingsmeadow
15:00 GMT	Potter 28'; Bulman 42'; Oshilaja (yellow card) 45+1'; Connolly 90+3'	Report	Stockley 45' (yellow card) 63'; Drury (yellow card) 55'; Lee 68' (yellow card) 90+1'	Attendance: 4,050; Referee: Fred Graham

24 February 2015 Game 32	Cambridge United	0–0	AFC Wimbledon	Abbey Stadium
19:45 GMT	Harrold (yellow card) 42'; Kaikai (yellow card) 90+3'	Report	Azeez (yellow card) 72'	Attendance: 4,259; Referee: Gavin Ward

28 February 2015 Game 33	Hartlepool United	1–0	AFC Wimbledon	Victoria Park
15:00 GMT	Bird 73'	Report	Fuller (yellow card) 40'; Potter (yellow card) 70'; Winfield (yellow card) 90+11'	Attendance: 3,345; Referee: Carl Boyeson

==== March ====
3 March 2015 Game 34	AFC Wimbledon	0–0	Southend United	Kingsmeadow
19:45 GMT		Report		Attendance: 3,658; Referee: Graham Scott

7 March 2015 Game 35	AFC Wimbledon	2–1	York City	Kingsmeadow
15:00 GMT	Oshilaja 19'; Akinfenwa (yellow card) 72'; Smith 90'	Report	Hyde 43'; McCoy (yellow card) 76'	Attendance: 4,086; Referee: Gary Sutton

14 March 2015 Game 36	Exeter City	3–2	AFC Wimbledon	St James Park
15:00 GMT	Riley-Lowe (yellow card) 25'; Nichols 54', 66' (pen.); Wheeler 70'	Report	Akinfenwa 4'; Bulman (red card) 25'; Oshilaja (yellow card) 80'; Hamon 89' (o.g.)	Attendance: 3,713; Referee: Darren Deadman

17 March 2015 Game 37	Mansfield Town	2–1	AFC Wimbledon	Field Mill
19:45 GMT	Beevers 56'; Bingham 87'	Report	Francomb 69' (pen.)	Attendance: 3,151; Referee: Scott Duncan

21 March 2015 Game 38	AFC Wimbledon	1–0	Portsmouth	Kingsmeadow
15:00 GMT	Chorley 6' (o.g.); Rigg (yellow card) 9'; Moore (yellow card) 89'; Akinfenwa (yellow card) 90+4'	Report	Chorley (yellow card) 60'; Wallace (yellow card) 67'; Westcarr (yellow card) 90'; Kpekawa (yellow card) 90+5'	Attendance: 4,485; Referee: Carl Berry

28 March 2015 Game 39	Tranmere Rovers	1–1	AFC Wimbledon	Prenton Park
15:00 GMT	Donnelly (yellow card) 63'; Green 90+4' (yellow card) 90+5'	Report	Akinfenwa 29' (yellow card) 71'; Rigg (yellow card) 52'; Goodman (yellow card) 76'; Moore (yellow card) 89'	Attendance: 5,592; Referee: Andy Woolmer

==== April ====
3 April 2015 Game 40	AFC Wimbledon	2–2	Northampton Town	Kingsmeadow
15:00 GMT	Rigg (yellow card) 50' (goal) 58'; Reeves 60' (yellow card) 76'	Report	Byrom (yellow card) 23'; Diamond (yellow card) 48'; Gray 66' 69'; Holmes (yellow card) 73'	Attendance: 4,667; Referee: (England) Chris Sarginson

6 April 2015 Game 41	Dagenham & Redbridge	4–0	AFC Wimbledon	Victoria Road
15:00 GMT	Cureton 2' 71' 74'; Doe 58'	Report		Attendance: 2,346; Referee: (England) Stuart Attwell

11 April 2015 Game 42	AFC Wimbledon	0–0	Oxford United	Kingsmeadow
15:00 GMT	Goodman (yellow card) 61'; Fuller (yellow card) 66'	Report		Attendance: 4,234; Referee: (England) Lee Collins

14 April 2015 Game 43	Plymouth Argyle	1–1	AFC Wimbledon	Home Park
19:45 GMT	O'Connor 54'	Report	Bulman (yellow card) 43'; Azeez 62'	Attendance: 6,900; Referee: (England) Kevin Johnson

18 April 2015 Game 44	AFC Wimbledon	0–0	Wycombe Wanderers	Kingsmeadow
15:00 GMT	Rigg (yellow card) 52'; Tanner (yellow card) 75'	Report	Pierre (yellow card) 57' (yellow-red card); Kretzschmar (yellow card) 90+6'	Attendance: 4,535; Referee: (England) Trevor Kettle

25 April 2015 Game 45	Bury	2–0	AFC Wimbledon	Gigg Lane
15:00 GMT	Soares 33'; Lowe 77'	Report	Smith (yellow card) 27'; Reeves (yellow card) 80'	Attendance: 4,099; Referee: (England) Geoff Eltringham

==== May ====
2 May 2015 Game 46	AFC Wimbledon	1–1	Cheltenham Town	Kingsmeadow
15:00 GMT	Smith 44'		Berry (yellow card) 19' (goal) 25'; Brown (yellow card) 51'; Braham-Barrett (yellow card) 90+3'	Attendance: 4,374; Referee: (England) Andy Davies

=== FA Cup 2014–15 ===
8 November 2014 First Round	York City	1–1	AFC Wimbledon	Bootham Crescent
15:00 GMT	Hyde 8'; McCoy (yellow card) 43'; Fletcher (yellow card) 67'	Report	Frampton 22'	Attendance: 2,085; Referee: Mark Brown

18 November 2014 First Round Replay	AFC Wimbledon	3–1	York City	Kingsmeadow
19:45 GMT	Rigg (yellow card) 26'; Akinfenwa (yellow card) 31'; Smith 71'; Tubbs 81', 90'; Moore (yellow card) 90'	Report	Fletcher 5'	Attendance: 2,048; Referee: Peter Bankes

7 December 2014 Second Round	Wycombe Wanderers	0–1	AFC Wimbledon	Adams Park
15:00 GMT	Pierre (yellow card) 23'; Murphy (yellow card) 40'	Report	Moore (yellow card) 44'; Rigg 56'; Tubbs (yellow card) 70'; Goodman (yellow card) 72'; Francomb (yellow card) 76'	Attendance: 3,196; Referee: Chris Kavanagh

5 January 2015 Third Round	AFC Wimbledon	1–2	Liverpool	Kingsmeadow
19:55 GMT	Akinfenwa 36' (yellow card) 39'; Fuller (yellow card) 61'; Goodman (yellow card) 70'		Gerrard 12', 62'; Coutinho (yellow card) 77'	Attendance: 4,784; Referee: Jon Moss

=== Football League Cup 2014–15 ===
12 August 2014 First Round	Milton Keynes Dons	3–1	AFC Wimbledon	Stadium mk
19:45 BST	McFadzean 19'; Powell 49'; Alli (yellow card) 55'; Green (yellow card) 58'; Afobe (yellow card) 65' (goal) 76'	Report	Tubbs (yellow card) 45+1' (goal) 90+4' (pen.); Bulman (yellow card) 58'	Attendance: 7,174; Referee: Dean Whitestone

=== Football League Trophy 2014–15 ===
2 September 2014 First Round	AFC Wimbledon	2–2 (4–2 p)	Southend United	Kingsmeadow
19:45 BST	Sainte-Luce 16'; Pell (red card) 20'; Phillips (yellow card) 42'; Azeez (yellow card) 44'; Beere (yellow card) 51'; Barrett 88'	Report	Payne 5', 51'	Attendance: 1,495; Referee: Charles Breakspear
	Penalties
	Nicholson (penalty scored); Bulman (penalty scored); Beere (penalty scored); Tubbs (penalty scored)		Payne (penalty scored); Barnard (penalty missed); Corr (penalty scored); Coker (penalty missed)

7 October 2014 Second Round	Milton Keynes Dons	2–3	AFC Wimbledon	Stadium MK
19:45 BST	Powell 2' (yellow card) 90+3'; Carruthers (yellow card) 7'; Afobe 40'; Randall (yellow card) 74'	Report	Azeez 26'; Bulman (yellow card) 33'; Francomb (yellow card) 35'; Nicholson (yellow card) 40'; Rigg 68'; Akinfenwa 80'	Attendance: 4,407; Referee: Tim Robinson

11 November 2014 Third Round	Bristol City	2–1	AFC Wimbledon	Ashton Gate Stadium
19:45 GMT	Wilbraham 73', 77'	Report	Francomb 84'	Attendance: 4,647; Referee: Stuart Attwell

== Player statistics ==
=== Appearances and goals ===
As of 28 March 2015.

No.	Pos	Nat	Player	Total		League Two		FA Cup		League Cup		JP Trophy	
No.	Pos	Nat	Player	Apps	Goals	Apps	Goals	Apps	Goals	Apps	Goals	Apps	Goals
1	GK	(England) ENG	Ross Worner	3	0	3	0	0	0	0	0	0	0
2	DF	(England) ENG	Barry Fuller	45	1	38	1	4	0	1	0	2	0
3	DF	(England) ENG	Jack Smith	21	3	17	2	2	1	1	0	1	0
4	MF	(England) ENG	Dannie Bulman	42	1	34+1	1	4	0	1	0	1+1	0
5	DF	(England) ENG	Andy Frampton	6	1	3+1	0	1	1	0	0	1	0
7	MF	(England) ENG	George Francomb	36	4	26+5	4	3	0	1	0	1	0
8	MF	(England) ENG	Sammy Moore	34	0	25+4	0	2+1	0	1	0	1	0
10	FW	(England) ENG	Adebayo Akinfenwa	43	15	35+2	13	4	1	1	0	0+1	1
11	FW	(England) ENG	Sean Rigg	44	6	32+5	4	4	1	1	0	1+1	1
14	FW	(England) ENG	Ade Azeez	43	6	10+27	5	1+3	0	0	0	2	1
15	DF	(England) ENG	Mark Phillips	7	0	2+3	0	0	0	1	0	1	0
17	DF	(England) ENG	Callum Kennedy	30	0	20+6	0	2	0	0+1	0	1	0
19	MF	(England) ENG	Jake Reeves	16	1	16	1	0	0	0	0	0	0
20	GK	(England) ENG	James Shea	40	0	33	0	4	0	1	0	2	0
21	MF	(England) ENG	Tom Beere	14	0	4+8	0	0	0	0	0	2	0
22	DF	(England) ENG	Will Nightingale	4	0	3+1	0	0	0	0	0	0	0
23	FW	(England) ENG	George Oakley	6	0	0+5	0	0+1	0	0	0	0	0
24	GK	(England) ENG	Ashley Bayes	0	0	0	0	0	0	0	0	0	0
25	MF	(England) ENG	Chace Jacquart	0	0	0	0	0	0	0	0	0	0
26	GK	(England) ENG	Joe McDonnell	4	0	3+1	0	0	0	0	0	0	0
27	FW	(England) ENG	Craig Tanner	12	0	11+1	0	0	0	0	0	0	0
28	DF	(England) ENG	George Pilbeam	0	0	0	0	0	0	0	0	0	0
29	DF	(England) ENG	Ben Harrison	7	0	4+1	0	0+1	0	0	0	0+1	0
30	MF	(England) ENG	David Fitzpatrick	1	0	0+1	0	0	0	0	0	0	0
32	DF	(England) ENG	Ryan Sweeney	0	0	0	0	0	0	0	0	0	0
33	DF	(England) ENG	Jake Goodman	10	1	8	1	2	0	0	0	0	0
35	MF	(England) ENG	Alfie Potter	12	1	8+4	1	0	0	0	0	0	0
37	MF	(England) ENG	Dan Gallagher	0	0	0	0	0	0	0	0	0	0
38	MF	(England) ENG	Dan Agyei	0	0	0	0	0	0	0	0	0	0
40	DF	(England) ENG	Adedeji Oshilaja	16	1	16	1	0	0	0	0	0	0
Players who featured on loan for AFC Wimbledon but subsequently returned to their parent club:
9	FW	(England) ENG	Matt Tubbs	29	15	22	12	3+1	2	1	1	0+2	0
27	DF	(England) ENG	Adam Barrett	29	2	23	1	4	0	0	0	2	1
31	MF	(Republic of Ireland) IRL	Frankie Sutherland	10	1	4+3	1	2+1	0	0	0	0	0
36	DF	(England) ENG	Dave Winfield	7	0	7	0	0	0	0	0	0	0
Players who left or were released by AFC Wimbledon during the course of the season:
6	DF	(Republic of Ireland) IRL	Alan Bennett	19	0	16	0	1+1	0	1	0	0	0
12	MF	(England) ENG	Harry Pell	12	0	1+8	0	0+2	0	0	0	1	0
16	MF	(France) FRA	Kevin Sainte-Luce	11	1	1+8	0	0	0	0+1	0	1	1
18	MF	(England) ENG	Jake Nicholson	4	0	2	0	0	0	0	0	2	0
19	MF	(England) ENG	Chris Arthur	1	0	0	0	0	0	0+1	0	0	0
34	FW	(Republic of Ireland) IRL	David Connolly	8	1	2+6	1	0	0	0	0	0	0

=== Top scorers ===
Rank	Position	Nation	Number	Player	League Two	FA Cup	League Cup	JP Trophy	Total
1	FW	(England)	10	Adebayo Akinfenwa	13	1	0	1	15
2	FW	(England)	9	Matt Tubbs	12	2	1	0	15
3	FW	(England)	14	Ade Azeez	5	0	0	1	6
=	FW	(England)	11	Sean Rigg	4	1	0	1	6
4	MF	(England)	7	George Francomb	3	0	0	0	3
5	DF	(England)	3	Jack Smith	1	1	0	0	2
=	DF	(England)	27	Adam Barrett	1	0	0	1	2
6	DF	(England)	2	Barry Fuller	1	0	0	0	1
6	MF	(England)	19	Jake Reeves	1	0	0	0	1
6	MF	(Republic of Ireland)	31	Frankie Sutherland	1	0	0	0	1
6	DF	(England)	33	Jake Goodman	1	0	0	0	1
6	MF	(England)	4	Dannie Bulman	1	0	0	0	1
6	FW	(Republic of Ireland)	34	David Connolly	1	0	0	0	1
6	DF	(England)	35	Alfie Potter	1	0	0	0	1
6	DF	(England)	5	Andy Frampton	0	1	0	0	1
6	MF	(France)	16	Kevin Sainte-Luce	0	0	0	1	1
TOTALS					46	6	1	5	60*

*Including own goals by opposition.

=== Disciplinary record ===
Number	Position	Nation	Name	League Two		FA Cup		League Cup		JP Trophy		Total	
Number	Position	Nation	Name	Yellow card	Red card	Yellow card	Red card	Yellow card	Red card	Yellow card	Red card	Yellow card	Red card
2	DF	(England)	Barry Fuller	6	0	1	0	0	0	0	0	7	0
4	MF	(England)	Dannie Bulman	6	1	0	0	1	0	1	0	8	1
6	DF	(Republic of Ireland)	Alan Bennett	3	0	0	0	0	0	0	0	3	0
7	MF	(England)	George Francomb	1	0	1	0	0	0	1	0	3	0
8	MF	(England)	Sammy Moore	3	0	2	0	0	0	0	0	5	0
9	FW	(England)	Matt Tubbs	3	1	1	0	1	0	0	0	5	1
10	FW	(England)	Adebayo Akinfenwa	4	0	2	0	0	0	0	0	6	0
11	FW	(England)	Sean Rigg	7	0	1	0	0	0	0	0	8	0
12	MF	(England)	Harry Pell	3	0	0	0	0	0	0	1	2	1
14	FW	(England)	Ade Azeez	2	0	0	0	0	0	1	0	3	0
15	DF	(England)	Mark Phillips	0	1	0	0	0	0	1	0	1	1
17	DF	(England)	Callum Kennedy	1	0	0	0	0	0	0	0	1	0
18	MF	(England)	Jake Nicholson	1	0	0	0	0	0	1	0	2	0
21	MF	(England)	Tom Beere	0	0	0	0	0	0	1	0	1	0
27	DF	(England)	Adam Barrett	3	0	0	0	0	0	0	0	3	0
29	DF	(England)	Ben Harrison	1	0	0	0	0	0	0	0	1	0
31	MF	(Republic of Ireland)	Frankie Sutherland	1	0	0	0	0	0	0	0	1	0
33	DF	(England)	Jake Goodman	2	0	2	0	0	0	0	0	4	0
35	MF	(England)	Alfie Potter	1	0	0	0	0	0	0	0	1	0
36	DF	(England)	Dave Winfield	2	0	0	0	0	0	0	0	2	0
40	DF	(England)	Adedeji Oshilaja	3	0	0	0	0	0	0	0	3	0
			TOTALS	53	3	10	0	2	0	6	1	71	4

== Transfers ==
Players Transferred In
Date	Position	Nation	Name	Previous club	Fee	Ref.
22 May 2014	FW	(England)	Sean Rigg	Oxford United	Free	
10 June 2014	MF	(England)	Dannie Bulman	Crawley Town	Free	
20 June 2014	FW	(England)	Adebayo Akinfenwa	Gillingham	Free	
23 June 2014	DF	(England)	Mark Phillips	Southend United	Free	
26 June 2014	FW	(England)	Ade Azeez	Charlton Athletic	Free	
4 July 2014	GK	(England)	James Shea	Harrow Borough	Free	
4 July 2014	GK	(England)	Joe McDonnell	Basingstoke Town	Undisclosed	
7 July 2014	DF	(England)	Jack Smith	Millwall	Free	
24 September 2014	MF	(England)	David Fitzpatrick	Queens Park Rangers	Free	
7 January 2015	MF	(England)	Jake Reeves	Swindon Town	Free	
15 January 2015	FW	(Republic of Ireland)	David Connolly	Portsmouth	Free	
16 January 2015	MF	(England)	Alfie Potter	Oxford United	Free	
Players Loaned In
Date from	Position	Nation	Name	From	Date to	Ref.
16 June 2014	FW	(England)	Matt Tubbs	Bournemouth	6 January 2015	
7 August 2014	DF	(England)	Adam Barrett	Gillingham	4 January 2015	
30 October 2014	MF	(Republic of Ireland)	Frankie Sutherland	Queens Park Rangers	6 January 2015	
27 November 2014	DF	(England)	Jake Goodman	Millwall	30 June 2015	
8 January 2015	DF	(England)	Adedeji Oshilaja	Cardiff City	30 June 2015	
22 January 2015	FW	(England)	Craig Tanner	Reading	30 June 2015	
12 February 2015	DF	(England)	Dave Winfield	York City	19 March 2015	
Players Loaned Out
Date from	Position	Nation	Name	To	Date to	Ref.
21 August 2014	MF	(England)	Chris Arthur	Woking	4 January 2015	
11 September 2014	GK	(England)	Ross Worner	Woking	28 December 2014	
3 October 2014	DF	(England)	Mark Phillips	Aldershot Town	6 January 2015	
29 October 2014	MF	(England)	Harry Pell	Grimsby Town	26 November 2014	
Players Transferred Out
Date	Position	Nation	Name	Subsequent club	Fee	Ref
22 May 2014	FW	(England)	Charlie Sheringham	Ebbsfleet United	Free	
29 May 2014	DF	(Wales)	Aaron Morris	Gillingham	Free	
6 June 2014	DF	(England)	Jim Fenlon	Ross County	Free	
6 January 2015	MF	(England)	Chris Arthur	Woking	Free	
7 January 2015	MF	(Guadeloupe)	Kevin Sainte-Luce	Gateshead	Free	
9 January 2015	MF	(England)	Jake Nicholson	Released	Free	
29 January 2015	MF	(England)	Harry Pell	Eastleigh	Free	
6 February 2015	DF	(Republic of Ireland)	Alan Bennett	Cork City	Free	
12 March 2015	DF	(England)	Andy Frampton	Retired	N/A	
