= NetFlights =

Travel agency in the United Kingdom

Netflights.com is an internet based travel company and part of Gold Medal Travel Group in the United Kingdom supplying flights, hotels, holidays and car hires. Established in 1992 as Airline Network, the company was privately owned 100% by Ken Townsley. In February 2014 the company was acquired by Dubai-based air service provider dnata, that is part of the Emirates Group.

Netflights.com won the Best Digital Experience in the Leisure, Entertainment, Events & Travel sector at the UK Digital Experience Awards 2014 and were commended in the Large Size Online Retailer Site of the Year category at the Online Retail Awards 2014.

== See also ==
- Mystifly
- AsiaYo
