= Tamer Tuna =

Tamer Tuna may refer to:

- Tamer Tuna (footballer, born 1976), Turkish football player and coach
- Tamer Tuna (footballer, born 1991), Turkish football player
