= Nicky Bailey =

English footballer (born 1984)

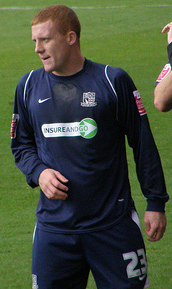
- Bailey playing for Southend United

Personal information
- Full name: Nicholas Francis Bailey
- Date of birth: 10 June 1984 (age 42)
- Place of birth: Putney, England
- Height: 5 ft 10 in (1.78 m)
- Position: Midfielder

Youth career
- Fulham
- 2000–2001: Sutton United

Senior career*
Years	Team	Apps	(Gls)
2001–2004	Sutton United	85	(27)
2004–2007	Barnet	125	(17)
2007–2008	Southend United	45	(9)
2008–2010	Charlton Athletic	89	(25)
2010–2013	Middlesbrough	99	(4)
2013–2015	Millwall	36	(1)
2015	Barnet	2	(0)
2016–2019	Sutton United	107	(9)
2019–2020	Havant & Waterlooville	34	(2)
2020–2021	Gosport Borough	4	(0)
2021	Cray Wanderers	2	(0)
Total		628	(94)

International career
2005	England C	4	(0)
- * Club domestic league appearances and goals

Nicholas Francis Bailey (born 10 June 1984) is an English retired professional footballer who played as a midfielder. He has played for the England C national team.

== Club career ==
=== Early career and Barnet ===
Bailey, born in Putney, London, began his career with local team Fulham but was released and moved to non-league Sutton United where he played as a teenager. At twenty, he went to Conference side Barnet in 2004 for a tribunal fee of £10,000.

Bailey was Paul Fairclough's first signing as Barnet manager, and he immediately established himself as a regular for the club.

Bailey made his Barnet debut against Farnborough Town in a 0–0 draw in the Football Conference on 17 August 2004, and scored his first goal for the club on 4 September 2004 in a 5–1 win against Morecambe. He helped the club to promotion in the 2004–05 season and then establish itself in Football League Two over the following two years. In 2006-7 he was voted Barnet FC Player of the Season by the club's supporters.

=== Southend United ===
After attracting interest from several clubs during the January transfer window, it was announced on 29 June 2007 that Bailey was discussing terms with Southend United of League One. He eventually signed with Southend on 3 July 2007 for a fee of £175,000. After winning the club's player of the year award for the 2007–08 season, Bailey was transfer listed on 5 June 2008 after failing to agree to terms over a contract extension. He signed with Charlton Athletic on a three-year contract for a fee that could reach £750,000 in August 2008, seeking championship football and a higher wage, a move that has made him unpopular with Southend fans.

=== Charlton Athletic ===
Charlton Athletic were relegated from the championship after finishing at the bottom of the table, despite Bailey finishing as top scorer. He was voted the club's player of the season.

On 26 April 2010 it was announced that Bailey was in the 2009–10 PFA team of the year alongside teammate Frazer Richardson. Bailey captained Charlton to a semi-final playoff defeat against Swindon Town, the semi-final went to penalties and it was Bailey who missed the decisive spot kick for Charlton to send Swindon through to the final. It was to be his last kick as a Charlton player.

=== Middlesbrough ===
On 19 June 2010 the BBC claimed that Middlesbrough F.C. were set to sign Bailey for a fee of £1.4m. The deal was confirmed by both clubs on 24 June 2010, and Bailey was officially announced as a Middlesbrough player on 8 July. Bailey had a difficult start as a Middlesbrough player, however under new manager Tony Mowbray, Bailey was converted to a more defensive minded midfielder and became popular with the fans. His ongoing impressive form led to Bailey being nominated for the Championship player of the month in December 2011.

Bailey scored his first goal for Middlesbrough against Burnley on 10 September 2011. Bailey then scored again in Middlesbrough's 2–1 home win against Southampton. Bailey scored on 21 August 2012, his third goal for Boro, again against Burnley in a 3–2 home win. Following injuries to Rhys Williams and Jonathan Woodgate, Bailey captained Boro three times in the 2012–13 season. Bailey's fourth Boro goal was a spectacular long shot in a 2–1 home defeat to Leicester City. At the end of the 2012–13 season Bailey's contract expired.

=== Millwall ===
Bailey joined Millwall on a two-year deal in July 2013. He suffered numerous injuries during his two years with the club, limiting him to 39 appearances. He was released at the end of the 2014–15 season following Millwall's relegation to League One.

=== Barnet ===
Bailey started training with Barnet in October 2015, and re-signed on a short-term deal later in the month. On 23 December, Bailey was released after only four appearances.

=== Sutton United ===
At the end of his contract with Barnet, Bailey re-signed for Sutton United, initially until the end of the 2015–16 season. In his second spell at Sutton, Bailey made his first league appearance in a 2–0 away victory against Chelmsford City on 30 January 2016. He made a total of nine full and seven substitute appearances for the U's, helping them win the National League South title.

Bailey agreed to stay with Sutton for the 2016–17 season, playing in the National League, and scored the first goal in his new spell at the club by converting a penalty against Forest Green Rovers at The New Lawn on 9 August 2016, a game which ended in a 1–1 draw. After a string of impressive performances, Sutton supporters unofficially voted Bailey player of the month for August. Having converted two further penalties, one in a victory over Torquay United on 16 August and the other a consolation in a 2–1 defeat to Braintree Town on 13 September, Bailey scored his first goal for Sutton from open play on 8 October when he finished a corner supplied by Ross Stearn in a 4–1 rout of Surrey rivals Woking at Gander Green Lane. On 19 October 2016, it was announced that Bailey had signed a one-year contract extension with Sutton United and will stay with the club until the end of the 2017–18 season.

Bailey appeared for Sutton during their historic run to the 5th round of the FA Cup for the first time ever, including a 1–0 victory over Championship club Leeds United on 29 January 2017 and 0–2 defeat to Premier League club Arsenal on 20 February, where he made more tackles and interceptions than any other player.

On 4 March, Bailey was instrumental in helping Sutton to secure their first away clean sheet back in the non-League top flight, a 0–0 draw at Barrow, since a 9–0 away victory against Gateshead on 22 September 1990. Bailey featured the following day in The Non-League Paper's team of the day. Across three and a half seasons, Bailey played 125 times for Sutton in his second spell, scoring nine goals.

=== Later career ===
Bailey followed Sutton manager Paul Doswell to Havant & Waterlooville for the 2019–20 season. He joined Gosport Borough on 19 September 2020. In September 2021 he joined Cray Wanderers.

== International career ==
Bailey was picked to play for the England C national team, by Paul Fairclough when he was also manager of Barnet. He made four appearances before moving into the Football League, which meant he could no longer take part.

== Career statistics ==
As of match played 14 September 2021

Appearances and goals by club, season and competition
Club	Season	League			FA Cup		League Cup		Other		Total	
Club	Season	Division	Apps	Goals	Apps	Goals	Apps	Goals	Apps	Goals	Apps	Goals
Sutton United	2001–02	Isthmian League Premier Division	5	0			—				5	0
Sutton United	2002–03	Isthmian League Premier Division	37	14			—				37	14
Sutton United	2003–04	Isthmian League Premier Division	43	13			—				43	13
Sutton United	Total		85	27			—				85	27
Barnet	2004–05	Conference National	36	5	1	0	—		4 (Note: Two appearances and two goals in Football League Trophy, two appearances and two goals in FA Trophy)	4	41	9
Barnet	2005–06	League Two	46	7	1	0	2	1	2 (Note: Appearances in Football League Trophy)	1	51	9
Barnet	2006–07	League Two	43	5	4	0	3	0	2	0	52	5
Barnet	Total		125	17	6	0	5	1	8	5	144	23
Southend United	2007–08	League One	44	9	5	2	3	0	3 (Note: Two appearances and one goal in League Two play-offs, one in Football League Trophy)	1	55	12
Southend United	2008–09	League One	1	0	—		0	0	—		1	0
Southend United	Total		45	9	5	2	3	0	3	1	56	12
Charlton Athletic	2008–09	Championship	43	13	3	0	—		—		46	13
Charlton Athletic	2009–10	League One	46	12	1	0	1	0	1	1	49	13
Charlton Athletic	Total		89	25	4	0	1	0	1	1	95	26
Middlesbrough	2010–11	Championship	34	0	1	0	2	0	—		37	0
Middlesbrough	2011–12	Championship	37	2	0	0	2	0	—		39	2
Middlesbrough	2012–13	Championship	28	2	3	0	4	0	—		35	2
Middlesbrough	Total		99	4	4	0	8	0	—		111	4
Millwall	2013–14	Championship	28	1	1	0	2	0	—		31	1
Millwall	2014–15	Championship	8	0	0	0	0	0	—		8	0
Millwall	Total		36	1	1	0	2	0	—		39	1
Barnet	2015–16	League Two	2	0	2	0	—		—		4	0
Sutton United	2015–16	National League South	16	0	—		—		2 (Note: Appearances in FA Trophy)	0	18	0
Sutton United	2016–17	National League	38	7	5	0	—		2	0	45	7
Sutton United	2017–18	National League	30	1	2	0	—		2 (Note: One appearance in FA Trophy, one appearance in National League play-offs)	0	34	1
Sutton United	2018–19	National League	23	1	2	0	—		3 (Note: Two appearances in FA Trophy, one appearance in Scottish Challenge Cup)	0	28	1
Sutton United	Total		107	9	9	0	—		9	0	125	9
Havant & Waterlooville	2019–20	National League South	34	2	3	0	—		3 (Note: Two appearances in FA Trophy, one appearance in National League South playoffs)	0	40	2
Gosport Borough	2020–21	SFL Premier Division South	4	0	1	0	—		0	0	5	0
Cray Wanderers	2021–22	Isthmian League Premier Division	2	0	1	0	—		0	0	3	0
Career total			628	94	36	2	19	1	24	7	707	104

== Honours ==
Barnet

- Conference National: 2004–05

Sutton United

- National League South : 2015–16

Individual

- PFA Team of the Year: 2009–10 League One
