= 2009–10 Football League One =

Football League One
- Season: 2009–10
- Champions: Norwich City
- Promoted: Norwich City; Leeds United; Millwall
- Relegated: Gillingham; Wycombe Wanderers; Southend United; Stockport County
- Matches: 552
- Goals: 1,459 (2.64 per match)
- Top goalscorer: Rickie Lambert (30)
- Biggest home win: Huddersfield 7–1 Brighton; Huddersfield 6–0 Wycombe
- Biggest away win: Norwich 1–7 Colchester; Stockport 0–6 Huddersfield
- Highest scoring: Norwich 1–7 Colchester; Huddersfield 7–1 Brighton; Charlton 4–4 Millwall
- Longest winning run: 8 games Norwich City
- Longest unbeaten run: 16 games Norwich City
- Longest losing run: 12 games Stockport County
- Highest attendance: Leeds United 2–1 Bristol Rovers (38,234)
- Lowest attendance: Hartlepool United 1–1 Gillingham (2,465)
- Average attendance: 9,139

The Football League 2009–10 (called Coca-Cola Football League for sponsorship reasons), was the seventeenth season under its current league division format. It began in August 2009 and ended on 8 May 2010.

The Football League is contested through three divisions. The second division of these is League One. Norwich City and Leeds United were automatically promoted to the Football League Championship as winners and runners-up respectively, and they were joined by the winner of the League One play-offs Millwall. The bottom four teams in the league were relegated to the third division, League Two.

== Changes from last season ==
=== From League One ===
Promoted to Championship

- Leicester City
- Peterborough United
- Scunthorpe United

Relegated to League Two

- Northampton Town
- Crewe Alexandra
- Cheltenham Town
- Hereford United

=== To League One ===
Relegated from Championship

- Norwich City
- Southampton
- Charlton Athletic

Promoted from League Two

- Brentford
- Exeter City
- Wycombe Wanderers
- Gillingham

== League table ==
Pos	Team	Pld	W	D	L	GF	GA	GD	Pts	Promotion, qualification or relegation
1	Norwich City (C, P)	46	29	8	9	89	47	+42	95	Promotion to Football League Championship
2	Leeds United (P)	46	25	11	10	77	44	+33	86	Promotion to Football League Championship
3	Millwall (O, P)	46	24	13	9	76	44	+32	85	Qualification for League One play-offs
4	Charlton Athletic	46	23	15	8	71	48	+23	84	Qualification for League One play-offs
5	Swindon Town	46	22	16	8	73	57	+16	82	Qualification for League One play-offs
6	Huddersfield Town	46	23	11	12	82	56	+26	80	Qualification for League One play-offs
7	Southampton	46	23	14	9	85	47	+38	73 (Note: Southampton were given a ten-point deduction for breaching insolvency regulations, regarding their holding company. As they finished in the bottom three of the Championship last season, the points deduction were applied in the 2009–10 season.)	
8	Colchester United	46	20	12	14	64	52	+12	72	
9	Brentford	46	14	20	12	55	52	+3	62	
10	Walsall	46	16	14	16	60	63	−3	62	
11	Bristol Rovers	46	19	5	22	59	70	−11	62	
12	Milton Keynes Dons	46	17	9	20	60	68	−8	60	
13	Brighton & Hove Albion	46	15	14	17	56	60	−4	59	
14	Carlisle United	46	15	13	18	63	66	−3	58	
15	Yeovil Town	46	13	14	19	55	59	−4	53	
16	Oldham Athletic	46	13	13	20	39	57	−18	52	
17	Leyton Orient	46	13	12	21	53	63	−10	51	
18	Exeter City	46	11	18	17	48	60	−12	51	
19	Tranmere Rovers	46	14	9	23	45	72	−27	51	
20	Hartlepool United	46	14	11	21	59	67	−8	50 (Note: Hartlepool were deducted 3 points for fielding an ineligible player.)	
21	Gillingham (R)	46	12	14	20	48	64	−16	50	Relegation to Football League Two
22	Wycombe Wanderers (R)	46	10	15	21	56	76	−20	45	Relegation to Football League Two
23	Southend United (R)	46	10	13	23	51	72	−21	43	Relegation to Football League Two
24	Stockport County (R)	46	5	10	31	35	95	−60	25	Relegation to Football League Two

Source: The Football League
Rules for classification: 1) points; 2) goal difference; 3) number of goals scored.
(C) Champions; (O) Play-off winners; (P) Promoted; (R) Relegated

== Play-offs ==
Semi-finals
6	Huddersfield Town	0	0	0
3	Millwall	0	2	2
5	Swindon Town (p)	2	1	3
4	Charlton Athletic	1	2	3

Final at Wembley
3	Millwall	1
5	Swindon Town	0

=== First leg ===
14 May 2010
19:45 BST

Swindon Town	2–1	Charlton Athletic
Austin 52'; Ward 60'	(Report)	65' Burton

The County Ground, Swindon
Attendance: 13,560
Referee: James Linington

15 May 2010
12:15 BST

Huddersfield Town	0–0	Millwall
	(Report)

Galpharm Stadium, Huddersfield
Attendance: 14,654
Referee: Darren Deadman

=== Second leg ===
17 May 2010
19:45 BST

Charlton Athletic	2 – 1 (a.e.t.)	Swindon Town
Ferry 27' (o.g.); Mooney 45+3'; Miguel Llera (red card) 90+3'	(Report)	(red card) 67' Greer; 74' Ward
Penalties
Burton (penalty scored); Bailey (penalty missed); Forster (penalty scored); Dailly (penalty scored); Richardson (penalty scored)	4–5	(penalty scored) McGovern; (penalty scored) Austin; (penalty scored) Amankwaah; (penalty scored) Ward; (penalty scored) Darby

The Valley, London
Attendance: 21,521
Referee: Neil Swarbrick

Charlton Athletic 3–3 Swindon Town on aggregate. Swindon Town win 5–4 on penalties.

18 May 2010
19:45 BST

Millwall	2–0	Huddersfield Town
Morison 23'; Robinson 82'	(Report)

The Den, London
Attendance: 15,463
Referee: Tony Bates

Millwall win 2–0 on aggregate.

=== Final ===
29 May 2010
15:00 BST

Millwall	1–0	Swindon Town
Robinson 39'	(Report)

Wembley Stadium, London
Attendance: 73,108
Referee: Colin Webster

Millwall are promoted to the Football League Championship

== Results ==
Home \ Away	BRE	B&HA	BRR	CRL	CHA	COL	EXE	GIL	HAR	HUD	LEE	LEY	MIL	MKD	NWC	OLD	SOU	STD	STP	SWI	TRA	WAL	WYC	YEO
Brentford		0–0	1–3	3–1	1–1	1–0	0–0	4–0	0–0	3–0	0–0	1–0	2–2	3–3	2–1	1–1	1–1	2–1	2–0	2–3	2–1	1–1	1–1	1–1
Brighton & Hove Albion	3–0		2–1	1–2	0–2	1–2	2–0	2–0	3–3	0–0	0–3	0–0	0–1	0–1	1–2	0–2	2–2	2–3	2–4	0–1	3–0	0–1	1–0	1–0
Bristol Rovers	0–0	1–1		3–2	2–1	3–2	1–0	2–1	2–0	1–0	0–4	1–2	2–0	1–0	0–3	1–0	1–5	4–3	1–0	3–0	0–0	0–1	2–3	1–2
Carlisle United	1–3	0–2	3–1		3–1	2–1	0–1	2–0	3–2	1–2	1–3	2–2	1–3	5–0	0–1	1–2	1–1	2–1	0–0	0–1	3–0	1–1	1–0	1–0
Charlton Athletic	2–0	1–2	4–2	1–0		1–0	2–1	2–2	2–1	2–1	1–0	0–1	4–4	5–1	0–1	0–0	1–1	1–0	2–0	2–2	1–1	2–0	3–2	2–0
Colchester United	3–3	0–0	1–0	2–1	3–0		2–2	2–1	2–0	1–0	1–2	1–0	1–2	2–0	0–5	1–0	2–1	2–0	2–0	3–0	1–1	2–1	1–1	2–1
Exeter City	3–0	0–1	1–0	2–3	1–1	2–0		1–1	3–1	2–1	2–0	0–0	1–1	1–2	1–1	1–1	1–1	1–0	0–1	1–1	2–1	2–1	1–1	1–1
Gillingham	0–1	1–1	1–0	0–0	1–1	0–0	3–0		0–1	2–0	3–2	1–1	2–0	2–2	1–1	1–0	2–1	3–0	3–1	5–0	0–1	0–0	3–2	1–0
Hartlepool United	0–0	2–0	1–2	4–1	0–2	3–1	1–1	1–1		0–2	2–2	1–0	3–0	0–5	0–2	2–1	1–3	3–0	3–0	0–1	1–0	3–0	1–1	1–1
Huddersfield Town	0–0	7–1	0–0	1–1	1–1	2–1	4–0	2–1	2–1		2–2	4–0	1–0	1–0	1–3	2–0	3–1	2–1	0–0	2–2	3–3	4–3	6–0	2–1
Leeds United	1–1	1–1	2–1	1–1	0–0	2–0	2–1	4–1	3–1	2–2		1–0	0–2	4–1	2–1	2–0	1–0	2–0	2–0	0–3	3–0	1–2	1–1	4–0
Leyton Orient	2–1	1–1	5–0	2–2	1–2	0–1	1–1	3–1	1–3	0–2	1–1		1–0	1–2	2–1	1–2	2–2	1–2	2–0	0–0	2–1	2–0	2–0	2–0
Millwall	1–1	1–1	2–0	0–0	4–0	2–1	1–0	4–0	1–0	3–1	2–1	2–1		3–2	2–1	2–0	1–1	2–0	5–0	3–2	5–0	2–1	0–2	0–0
Milton Keynes Dons	0–1	0–0	2–1	3–4	0–1	2–1	1–1	2–0	0–0	2–3	0–1	1–0	1–3		2–1	0–0	0–3	3–1	4–1	2–1	1–0	1–0	2–3	2–2
Norwich City	1–0	4–1	5–1	0–2	2–2	1–7	3–1	2–0	2–1	3–0	1–0	4–0	2–0	1–1		2–0	0–2	2–1	2–1	1–0	2–0	0–0	5–2	3–0
Oldham Athletic	2–3	0–2	2–1	2–0	0–2	2–2	2–0	1–0	0–3	0–1	0–2	2–0	0–1	2–1	0–1		1–3	2–2	0–0	2–2	0–0	1–0	2–2	0–0
Southampton	1–1	1–3	2–3	3–2	1–0	0–0	3–1	4–1	3–2	5–0	1–0	2–1	1–1	3–1	2–2	0–0		3–1	2–0	0–1	3–0	5–1	1–0	2–0
Southend United	2–2	0–1	2–1	2–2	1–2	1–2	0–0	1–0	3–2	2–2	0–0	3–0	0–0	2–1	0–3	0–1	1–3		2–1	2–2	1–1	3–0	1–1	0–0
Stockport County	0–1	1–1	0–2	1–2	1–2	2–2	1–3	0–0	2–2	0–6	2–4	2–1	0–4	1–3	1–3	0–1	1–1	0–2		0–1	0–3	1–1	4–3	1–3
Swindon Town	3–2	2–1	0–4	2–0	1–1	1–1	1–1	3–1	0–2	2–1	3–0	3–2	1–1	0–0	1–1	4–2	1–0	2–1	4–1		3–0	1–1	1–1	3–1
Tranmere Rovers	1–0	2–1	2–0	0–0	0–4	1–1	3–1	4–2	0–0	0–2	1–4	2–1	2–0	0–1	3–1	0–1	2–1	2–0	0–1	1–4		2–3	0–3	2–1
Walsall	2–1	1–2	0–0	2–2	1–1	1–0	3–0	0–0	3–1	2–1	1–2	2–2	2–2	2–1	1–2	3–0	1–3	2–2	2–0	1–1	2–1		2–1	0–1
Wycombe Wanderers	1–0	2–5	2–1	0–0	1–2	1–1	2–2	3–0	2–0	1–2	0–1	0–1	1–0	0–1	0–1	2–2	0–0	1–1	2–1	2–2	0–1	2–3		1–4
Yeovil Town	2–0	2–2	0–3	3–1	1–1	0–1	2–1	0–0	4–0	0–1	1–2	3–3	1–1	1–0	3–3	3–0	0–1	1–0	2–2	0–1	2–0	1–3	4–0	

Source: The Football League
Legend: Blue = home team win; Yellow = draw; Red = away team win.

== Top scorers ==
Rank	Scorer	Club	Goals
1	(England) Rickie Lambert	Southampton	30
2	(England) Billy Paynter	Swindon Town	26
3	(England) Jermaine Beckford	Leeds United	25
4	(England) Lee Barnard	Southampton/Southend Utd	24
4	(England) Grant Holt	Norwich City	24
6	(Wales) Steve Morison	Millwall	21
7	(England) Charlie Austin	Swindon Town	20
8	(Scotland) Jordan Rhodes	Huddersfield Town	19
9	(England) Chris Martin	Norwich City	17
10	(Republic of Ireland) Ian Harte	Carlisle United	16

== Stadia ==
Locations of the League One 2009–10 teams

Team	Stadium	Capacity
Leeds United	Elland Road	39,460
Southampton	St Mary's Stadium	32,689
Charlton Athletic	The Valley	27,111
Norwich City	Carrow Road	26,034
Huddersfield Town	Galpharm Stadium	24,500
Milton Keynes Dons	stadium:mk	22,000
Millwall	The Den	20,146
Carlisle United	Brunton Park Stadium	16,981
Tranmere Rovers	Prenton Park	16,567
Swindon Town	The County Ground	15,728
Brentford	Griffin Park	12,763
Southend United	Roots Hall	12,306
Bristol Rovers	Memorial Stadium	11,916
Gillingham	Priestfield Stadium	11,582
Walsall	Bescot Stadium	11,300
Wycombe Wanderers	Adams Park	11,000
Stockport County	Edgeley Park	10,651
Oldham Athletic	Boundary Park	10,638
Colchester United	Colchester Community Stadium	10,000
Yeovil Town	Huish Park	9,978
Leyton Orient	Brisbane Road	9,271
Exeter City	St James Park	9,036
Brighton & Hove Albion	Withdean Stadium	8,850
Hartlepool United	Victoria Park	7,691

== Managerial changes ==
Team	Outgoing manager	Manner of departure	Date of vacancy	Replaced by	Date of appointment	Position in table
Norwich City	(Scotland) Bryan Gunn	Contract terminated	14 August 2009	(Scotland) Paul Lambert	18 August 2009	23rd
Colchester United	(Scotland) Paul Lambert	Resigned	18 August 2009	(England) Adrian Boothroyd	2 September 2009	1st
Wycombe Wanderers	(England) Peter Taylor	Mutual agreement	9 October 2009	(England) Gary Waddock	13 October 2009	23rd
Tranmere Rovers	(England) John Barnes	Contract terminated	9 October 2009	(England) Les Parry	16 December 2009	22nd
Brighton & Hove Albion	(England) Russell Slade	Contract terminated	1 November 2009	(Uruguay) Gus Poyet	10 November 2009	20th
Leyton Orient	(Wales) Geraint Williams	Contract terminated	3 April 2010	(England) Russell Slade	5 April 2010	19th

== Kits ==
Team	Kit maker	Sponsor
Brentford	Puma	Hertings Fixings (home), MKT Computers (away)
Brighton & Hove Albion	Erreà	It First
Bristol Rovers	Erreà	N-Gaged Training (home), Stevens, Hewlett & Perkins Solicitors (away)
Carlisle United	Le Coq Sportif	Stobart
Charlton Athletic	Joma	Krbs.com
Colchester United	Puma	Weston Group (home), JobServe (away)
Exeter City	Carbrini	Flybe
Gillingham	Vandanel	Krbs.com
Hartlepool United	Nike	Dove Energy (home), GPS Arabia (away)
Huddersfield Town	Mitre	Yorkshire Air Ambulance (home), RadianB (away)
Leeds United	Macron	NetFlights.com
Leyton Orient	Puma	PartyCasino
Millwall	Bukta	CYC Courier Services
Milton Keynes Dons	Nike	Double Tree by Hilton
Norwich City	Xara	Aviva
Oldham Athletic	Carbrini	Carbrini
Southampton	Umbro	Flybe
Southend United	Nike	InsureandGo
Stockport County	Macron	Just Search
Swindon Town	Adidas	FourFourTwo (home), EA Sport FIFA 10 (away)
Tranmere Rovers	Vandanel	Wirral Metropolitan Council
Walsall	Admiral	Walsall Hospice
Wycombe Wanderers	Joma	Bucks New University
Yeovil Town	Vandanel	Jones Building Contractors
