= Ben Harrison (footballer, born 1997) =

English footballer

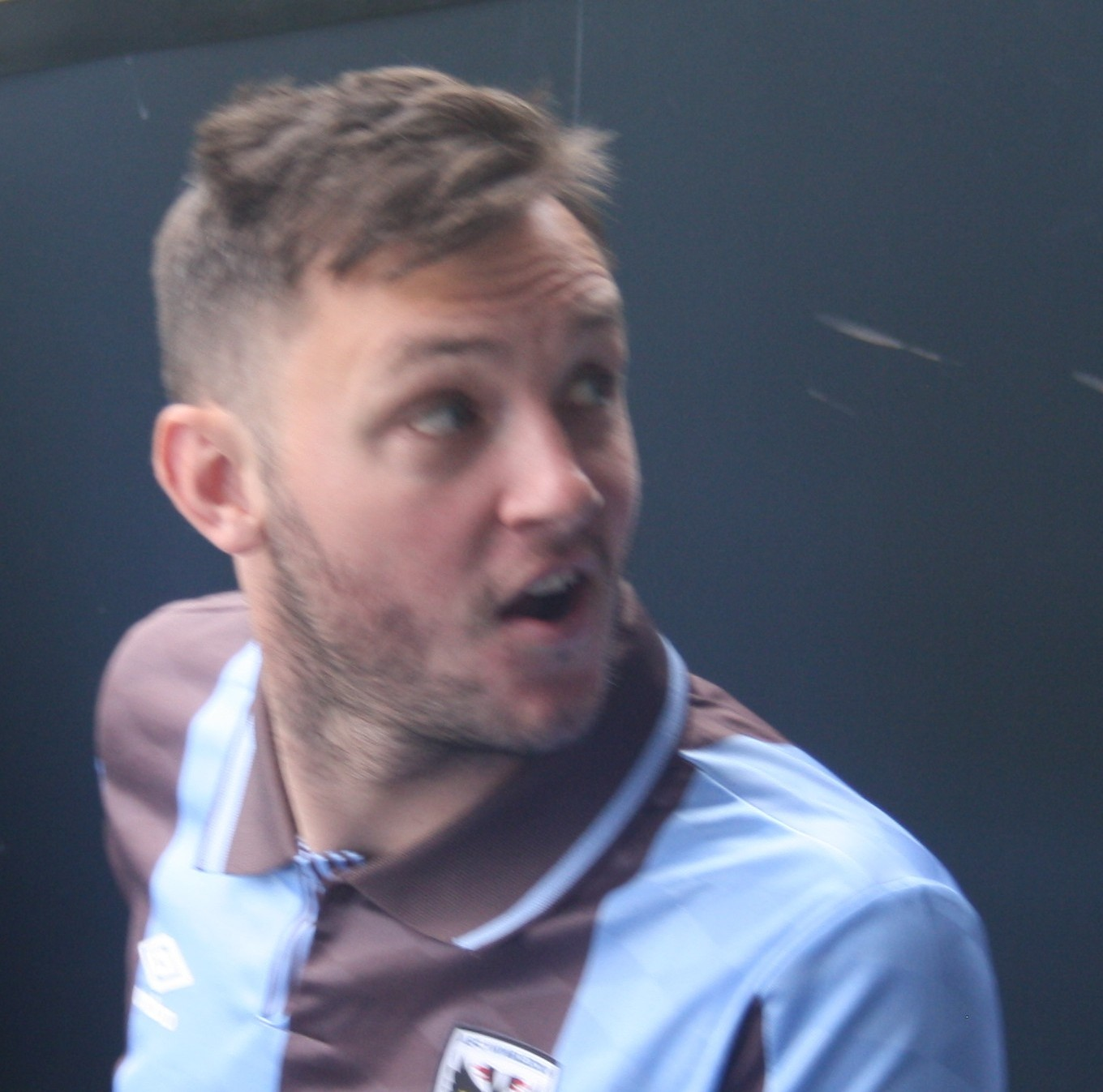
- Ben Harrison in 2025.

Personal information
- Full name: Ben Nicholas Harrison
- Date of birth: 2 March 1997 (age 29)
- Place of birth: Richmond, England
- Position: Defender

Team information
- Current team: Raynes Park Vale

Youth career
- 2007–2014: AFC Wimbledon

Senior career*
Years	Team	Apps	(Gls)
2014–2016	AFC Wimbledon	7	(0)
2016	→ Tonbridge (loan)	5	(0)
2017–2019	Merstham	9	(0)
2019–2021	Kingstonian	9	(0)
2020	→ East Grinstead Town (loan)	2	(0)
2020	→ East Grinstead Town (loan)	6	(0)
2021–	Raynes Park Vale	11	(0)
- * Club domestic league appearances and goals as of 18:02, 24 May 2021 (UTC)

Ben Nicholas Harrison (born 2 March 1997) is an English professional footballer who plays for Raynes Park Vale.

== Playing career ==
Having played for AFC Wimbledon since age ten, Harrison made his debut for AFC Wimbledon on 2 September 2014, coming on for Callum Kennedy at half-time during a Football League Trophy victory over Southend United at Kingsmeadow. He made his Football league debut on 13 September 2014, playing the full game at Accrington Stanley which ended in a 1–0 defeat for the "Dons". Harrison signed his first professional contract with AFC Wimbledon on 26 September 2014. In January 2016, Harrison joined Isthmian League Premier Division side Tonbridge Angels on a month's loan. In June 2016 Harrison was released by AFC Wimbledon.

Harrison joined Merstham in June 2017. Two years later, he joined Kingstonian. In May 2021, following loan spells at East Grinstead Town, Kingstonian announced Harrison's departure from the club, due to "personal reasons".

During the 2021–22 season, Harrison joined Raynes Park Vale.

== Statistics ==
As of 4 February 2015

Season	Club	Division	League		FA Cup		League Cup		Other		Total	
Season	Club	Division	Apps	Goals	Apps	Goals	Apps	Goals	Apps	Goals	Apps	Goals
2014–15	AFC Wimbledon	League Two	4	0	1	0	0	0	1	0	6	0
Total			4	0	1	0	0	0	1	0	6	0
Career total			4	0	1	0	0	0	1	0	6	0
