= Frankie Sutherland =

England-born Irish footballer (born 1993)

Frank Sutherland
Personal information
- Full name: Frankie Jay Sutherland
- Date of birth: 6 December 1993 (age 32)
- Place of birth: Hillingdon, England
- Height: 5 ft 9 in (1.75 m)
- Position: Midfielder

Team information
- Current team: Chesham United

Youth career
- 2005–2012: Queens Park Rangers

Senior career*
Years	Team	Apps	(Gls)
2012–2016	Queens Park Rangers	0	(0)
2013	→ Portsmouth (loan)	1	(0)
2013	→ Leyton Orient (loan)	0	(0)
2014–2015	→ AFC Wimbledon (loan)	7	(1)
2015	→ Dagenham & Redbridge (loan)	4	(0)
2016	→ Crawley Town (loan)	11	(0)
2016–2017	Woking	12	(0)
2017	Whitehawk	12	(3)
2017–2019	Bromley	74	(11)
2019–2020	Ebbsfleet United	30	(0)
2020–2021	Billericay Town	19	(1)
2021–2022	Farnborough	27	(1)
2022–	Chesham United	32	(0)

International career^{‡}
2009–2010	Republic of Ireland U17	11	(3)
2012	Republic of Ireland U19	5	(0)
2013	Republic of Ireland U21	6	(0)
- * Club domestic league appearances and goals as of 18:44, 19 April 2023 (UTC) ‡ National team caps and goals as of 14:21, 9 August 2017 (GMT)

Frankie Jay Sutherland (born 6 December 1993) is a professional footballer who plays as a midfielder for Southern League Premier Division South side Chesham United. A QPR academy graduate, Sutherland has also spent time on loan at Portsmouth, and has represented the Republic of Ireland at youth level.

== Club career ==
Born in Hillingdon, London, Sutherland is a product of Queens Park Rangers youth system in 2005, aged 11. In 2012 summer, he was promoted to the first team, receiving the no. 30 jersey. He also signed a new two-year contract with the London club, running until June 2015. In July 2013, Sutherland featured with QPR's first team in friendly matches against Beşiktaş, Southend United and Udinese, scoring a goal against the Italian giants.

In November, he was expected to join Portsmouth in a loan deal, but the move failed. On 15 January 2013, he joined Pompey in a one-month loan deal. On 24 February, he made his professional début, replacing Adam Reed in the 63rd minute of a 1–3 home defeat against Hartlepool. On 11 February, Sutherland returned to QPR, after just making one appearance for Pompey.

On 21 October 2013, Sutherland joined Leyton Orient in a one-month loan deal. He made his debut for Orient on 9 November in the 5–2 win at home to Southport in the first round of the FA Cup, but was stretchered off during the first half with an anterior cruciate ligament injury. He subsequently returned to QPR to begin a recovery estimated to take six to nine months.

On 30 October 2014, Sutherland joined AFC Wimbledon on an initial one-month loan deal. On 27 November 2014, Sutherland's loan deal at AFC Wimbledon was extended until 6 January 2015.

On 9 October 2015, Sutherland joined League Two side Dagenham & Redbridge on a 28-day loan.

On 30 September 2016, Sutherland joined National League side Woking, before being released and then signing for Brighton-based National League South side Whitehawk in January 2017.

On 4 August 2017, a day before the commencement of the National League season, it was announced that Sutherland had joined Bromley after a successful trial period.

Following spells with Ebbsfleet United and Billericay Town, Sutherland joined Southern League side, Farnborough on 13 November 2021. The season ended in promotion for Farnborough with victory over Hayes & Yeading United in the play-off final.

In August 2022, Sutherland returned to the Southern League Premier Division South to sign for Chesham United.

== International career ==
Sutherland represented Republic of Ireland under-17's, qualifying through his County Donegal-born grandmother, making his debut on 1 September 2009, in a Syrianka International Cup match against Russia, getting on the scoresheet. He then played another two matches, with Ireland being knocked out in the group stage. He also appeared on 2010 EURO U17 Qualifying and Elite rounds, scoring against Bulgaria.

Sutherland also played for Republic of Ireland under-19's, making his debut on 26 May 2012, against Portugal. He also played against Ukraine and Israel, with Ireland finished third in the group.

On 23 January 2013, he was called up to the Republic of Ireland under-21 squad.

== Career statistics ==
As of match played 7 April 2023

Appearances and goals by club, season and competition
Club	Season	League			FA Cup		League Cup		Other		Total	
Club	Season	Division	Apps	Goals	Apps	Goals	Apps	Goals	Apps	Goals	Apps	Goals
Queens Park Rangers	2012–13	Premier League	0	0	0	0	0	0	—		0	0
Queens Park Rangers	2013–14	Championship	0	0	—		0	0	0	0	0	0
Queens Park Rangers	2014–15	Premier League	0	0	—		0	0	—		0	0
Queens Park Rangers	2015–16	Championship	0	0	0	0	0	0	—		0	0
Queens Park Rangers	Total		0	0	0	0	0	0	—		0	0
Portsmouth (loan)	2012–13	League One	1	0	—		—		—		1	0
Leyton Orient (loan)	2013–14	League One	0	0	1	0	—		—		1	0
AFC Wimbledon (loan)	2014–15	League Two	7	1	3	0	—		1 (Note: Appearance in Football League Trophy)	0	11	1
Dagenham & Redbridge (loan)	2015–16	League Two	4	0	—		—		—		4	0
Crawley Town (loan)	2015–16	League Two	11	0	—		—		—		11	0
Woking	2016–17	National League	12	0	4	0	—		2 (Note: Appearances in FA Trophy)	0	18	0
Whitehawk	2016–17	National League South	12	3	—		—		—		12	3
Bromley	2017–18	National League	33	1	1	0	—		7	0	41	1
Bromley	2018–19	National League	41	10	2	0	—		1	0	44	10
Bromley	Total		74	11	3	0	—		8	0	85	11
Ebbsfleet United	2019–20	National League	30	0	3	0	—		3	0	36	0
Billericay Town	2020–21	National League South	10	0	1	0	—		1	0	12	0
Billericay Town	2021–22	National League South	9	1	0	0	—		—		9	1
Billericay Town	Total		19	1	1	0	—		1	0	21	1
Farnborough	2021–22	Southern League Premier Division South	27	1	—		—		4 (Note: Two appearances in FA Trophy, two in Southern League Premier Division South play-offs)	0	31	1
Chesham United	2022–23	Southern League Premier Division South	32	0	2	0	—		2	1	36	1
Career total			229	17	17	0	0	0	21	1	267	18

== Honours ==
Bromley

- FA Trophy runner-up: 2017–18
