= Peggy Lokando =

English-born Congolese footballer

Personal information
- Full name: Mbive Lokando
- Date of birth: 18 September 1989 (age 37)
- Place of birth: London, England
- Position: Midfielder

Team information
- Current team: Billericay Town

Youth career
- 1999–2006: Arsenal

Senior career*
Years	Team	Apps	(Gls)
2006–2007	Arsenal	0	(0)
2007–2009	Southend United	0	(0)
2008	→ Dagenham & Redbridge (loan)	0	(0)
2009	Leyton		
2009–2010	Crawley Town	2	(0)
2010	St Albans City	0	(0)
2010	Carshalton Athletic		
2011	Billericay Town		
2011–2012	Waltham Forest	20	(0)
2012–2013	Brentwood Town		
2013–	Billericay Town		

International career^{‡}
2008	DR Congo	1	(0)
- * Club domestic league appearances and goals as of 00:00, 2 March 2012 (UTC) ‡ National team caps and goals as of 24:00, 20 October 2008 (UTC)

Mbive "Peggy" Lokando (born 18 September 1989) is an English-born Congolese footballer who plays for Conference South club Billericay Town.

== Career ==
=== Club career ===
He got scouted by Arsenal in 1999, after having been with Haringey Borough since he was around eight. On 7 August 2007 he signed a professional contract for Southend United, having joined the club six-months before. Lokando made his debut in a 2–0 home win in the League Cup against Watford on 28 August 2007. Lokando was loaned out to Dagenham & Redbridge in September 2008, but failed to make a league appearance.

After a spell with Isthmian League Division One North side Leyton in 2009, Lokando joined Conference National club Crawley Town in November. He made his debut for Crawley on 24 November in the 2–0 home win over Salisbury City, replacing Thomas Pinault as a substitute in the 90th minute.

He signed for St Albans City in February 2010.

On 19 September 2010, he made his debut for Carshalton Athletic in a 3–0 away win against Wealdstone in the Isthmian League Premier Division. Lokando moved to Billericay Town in January 2011, after being released from Carshalton before Christmas 2010.

Lokando then joined Isthmian League Division One North club Waltham Forest in September 2011. He moved on to fellow Isthmian League club Brentwood Town in February 2012. In February 2013 he decided to re-join Billericay Town.

=== International career ===
He gained his first cap for Democratic Republic of Congo national football team against Gabon on 25 March 2008.
