= Mystifly =

- Company type: Private
- Industry: Travel Industry
- Founded: 2009; 16 years ago in Bangalore, India
- Founder: Rajeev Kumar
- Headquarters: Singapore
- Products: ASR Hub1.0, C2, MyFareBox, xClusive, MystiPay, Mystifly Universe
- Website: www.mystifly.com

Mystifly is an airfare distribution and payments settlement marketplace platform. It allows travel businesses to source airfares from global distribution systems (GDS), airlines and other airfare suppliers. Mystifly is headquartered in Singapore, with offices in the USA (New Jersey), UK (Middlesex) and India (Bangalore).

== History ==
Mystifly was founded in 2009 by Rajeev Kumar. He first got into global airfare consolidation as an idea in 2006 while he was looking for a London-India fare. The fare that Indian travel agencies quoted was much higher than it would be if he had bought it in London, and that’s when he realised how the industry worked. Further research and a few months of technology and process consulting helped solidify the idea, and gave birth to Mystifly.

Mystifly launched its application programming interface (API) at the WIT Conference in 2011.

Mystifly raised $5 million in Series A funding round led by RSI I Fund LLC, operated by Japanese private equity firm Recruit Holdings Co. Ltd. With this, the Japanese investor has a minority stake in the company.

In Nov, 2019 Mystifly launched travel industry’s first API for guaranteed & automated Voids, Refunds and Cancellation for flight tickets. Followed by that, in Feb, 2020 Mystifly announced the launch of New Generation Airline Retailing & Shopping API Platform ASR Hub 1.0 with branded fares feature. Recently, the company has managed to raise a Pre-Series B round of US$3.3 million from its existing investor, Recruit Co. Ltd.

== Products ==
- MyFareBox - A One-stop web-based travel Booking UI for all ticketing requirements – Search, Ticket and Post-Ticketing Services.
- ASR Hub 1.0 - An XML web service solution for Global flights retailing that helps travel companies ticket through an API integration.
- C2 - API solution based on Natural language processing and Machine learning model for guaranteed & automated Voids, Changes and Cancellation of flight tickets.
- xClusive - A simplfied travel API along with customer service for non-travel business
- MystiPay - A Payment and Settlement solution for Airlines and Travel businesses.
- Mystifly Universe - A flight Cache API

== Awards ==
Year	Awards	Category	Result	Ref.
2015	World Travel Awards	World's Leading Airline Consolidator	Won	
2016	World Travel Awards	World's Leading Airline Consolidator	Won	
2017	World Travel Awards	World's Leading Airline Consolidator	Won	
2018	World Travel Awards	World's Leading Airline Consolidator	Won	
2019	World Travel Awards	World's Leading Airline Consolidator	Won	
