= AsiaYo =

Taiwanese online travel agency

AsiaYo Travel Technology Co., Ltd.
- Industry: Tourism、Travel Agency
- Founded: 2013; 13 years ago
- Headquarters: Taiwan; 18F.-3, No. 77, Sec. 2, Dunhua S. Rd., Da'an District, Taipei city, Taiwan (R.O.C.)
- Key people: Cheng Chao-Kang（CEO）
- Website: www.asiayo.com

AsiaYo (Chinese: 亞揪遊旅行社) is a Taiwanese online travel agency founded in July 2013 by Cheng Chao-Kang, a former foreign investment analyst. The company offers a wide range of travel services, including package tour, cruises, high-speed rail packages, marathon travel package, day tours and camping experiences, hotel & bnb bookings. AsiaYo operates in over 50 cruise routes, 4,500 travel itineraries, 20 cruise group tour, 47 marathon travel packages, and more than 60,000 accommodations across 42 countries and 390 cities. Its headquarters are located in Taipei, Taiwan, with additional offices in Yilan, Tokyo, and Seoul.

== History ==
Prior in July 2013, AsiaYo was established in Taiwan as a platform specializing in homestay bookings. AsiaYo website was release in March 2014.

In June 2016, AsiaYo expanded services to Japan, Korea, and Thailand, and in December 2018 launched English version website which offering hotel bookings in Singapore, Malaysia, Hong Kong, and Macau.

In 2020–2022, AsiaYo provided quarantine hotel and camping reservation services in response to the COVID-19 pandemic.

In 2023, introduced cruise travel services and online booking for marathon entries.

In 2024, AsiaYo added global group tours and day tour reservations on the platform.

In 2025, AsiaYo started high-speed railway travel packages and high-speed railway tickets upselling services.

In 2026, AsiaYo was officially awarded the “2025 Star Cruises Top Sales Champion” by StarDream Cruises.

== Awards ==
In 2019, it was recognized as The Most Promising App (Chinese: 最具潛力App) by Google Play.

In 2024, AsiaYo was honored with the “Rising Star Award for Outstanding Sales Performance” by Resorts World Cruises, recognizing its strong market performance and rapid growth.

In 2025, AsiaYo achieved multiple significant milestones with Star Cruises. AsiaYo ranked No. 1 in sales for the Star Voyager sailings departing from Keelung as the homeport, and No. 3 in sales for sailings departing from Kaohsiung as the homeport. In addition, AsiaYo was awarded the “Annual Growth Award” by Dream Cruises in recognition of its exceptional year-over-year growth.
