= Luke Holden =

English footballer (born 1988)

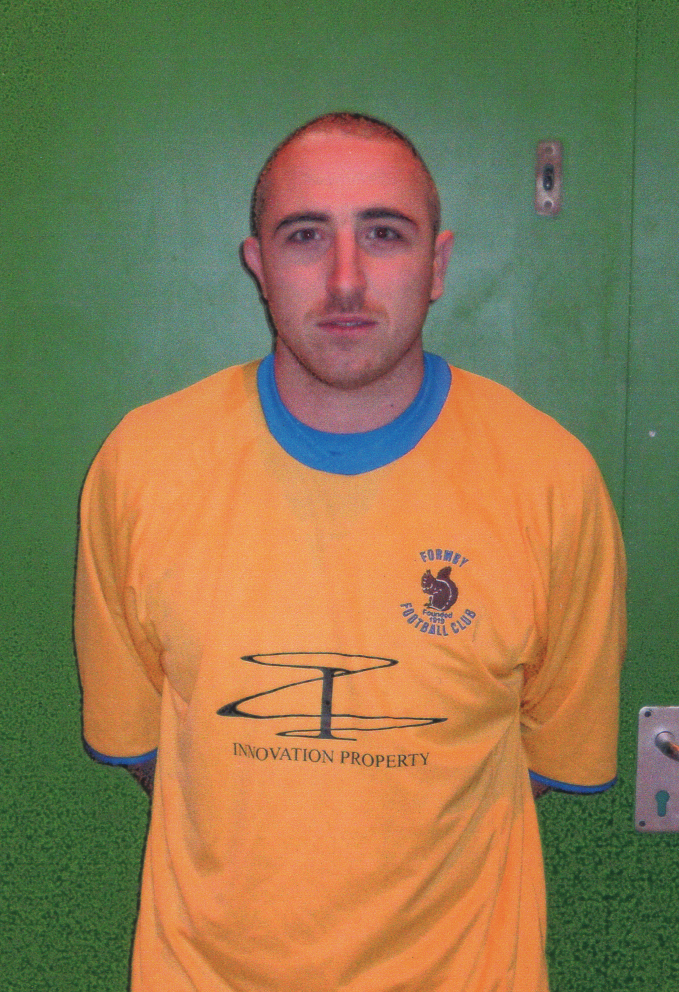

Personal information
- Date of birth: 24 November 1988 (age 37)
- Place of birth: Liverpool, England
- Position: Midfielder

Youth career
- Liverpool
- Everton
- –2007: Tranmere Rovers

Senior career*
Years	Team	Apps	(Gls)
2007–2008	The New Saints	27	(6)
2008	Cammell Laird	?	(?)
2008–2009	Bradford Park Avenue	?	(?)
2009–2010	Rhyl	11	(4)
2009–2010	→ Charlton Athletic (loan)	0	(0)
2010	→ Wrexham (loan)	15	(1)
2010–2011	Droylsden	38	(6)
2011–2012	Chester	3	(2)
2012	The New Saints	1	(0)
2012	Formby	3	(1)
2012	Gainsborough Trinity	5	(0)
2012	Formby	4	(2)
2012	Warrington Town	5	(1)
2012–2013	Colwyn Bay	6	(1)
2013–2014	Formby	23	(7)
2014	Connah's Quay Nomads	16	(4)
2015–2016	Marine	7	(1)
2017	Litherland REMYCA		
2019–2020	Skelmersdale United	7	(2)
2020–2021	Prestatyn Town	0	(0)
- * Club domestic league appearances and goals as of 16:17, 8 October 2015 (UTC)

Luke Holden (born 24 November 1988), also known as Luke Holden-Moakes, is an English footballer who plays as a midfielder.

== Career ==
Holden started out with Liverpool youth, aged 6 but was released by the club at the age of 12. He joined Everton's youth teams for eighteen months before moving to Tranmere Rovers as a trainee. Whilst at Tranmere he scored both the late goals that put Bury out of the FA Youth Cup in 2006. After being released in 2007, Holden signed for Welsh Premier League side The New Saints for the 2007–08 season, making 22 league starts scoring six goals as the team finished in second place.

He left The New Saints at the end of the season, following manager Ken McKenna to Northern Premier League Premier Division side Cammell Laird. A short spell at Bradford Park Avenue came before joining Rhyl in January 2009. He had an unfortunate time with injuries but still scored four goals in nine league starts and later played in both legs of Rhyl's Champions League qualifying matches against FK Partizan in July 2009.

A move to Football League Championship side Coventry City broke down after Holden was unable to agree personal terms and, on 1 September 2009, Holden instead signed for League One team Charlton Athletic on a three-month loan deal. He made just one appearance for Charlton, during a 2–1 defeat to Southampton in the Football League Trophy, before returning to Rhyl in January 2010.

Having been recommended to the club by former player Neil Roberts, Holden joined Conference National side Wrexham on trial before signing on a 93-day emergency loan deal with the club on 1 February 2010, making his debut the following day in a 2–1 victory over Mansfield Town. However, at the end of the season, Holden was not offered a permanent deal with the club. In July 2010, Holden joined Conference North side Droylsden, and stayed until transferring to Chester in November 2011 where he earned Man of the Match on his first start.

In January 2012 he rejoined one of his former teams, The New Saints, on non-contract terms. He made one Welsh Premier League appearance for the club against Neath, before a few days later being released by the club.

His next move was to Formby where he played just two games before moving in late March to Gainsborough Trinity. Holden was not amongst those players retained at the end of the 2011–12 season and thus left the club.

After trials for Rochdale in the summer of 2012 he rejoined Formby early in the 2012/13 season. He then joined Warrington Town in September, making his debut on 29 September against Clitheroe. Within the first month at the club, he was sent-off twice in three games. His only goal for the club came on 20 October when he scored a penalty in a 7–2 victory over Goole.

In November he joined Colwyn Bay, but in January 2014 moved to Welsh Premier League team Connah's Quay Nomads

In 2017 he played a couple of matches for Litherland REMYCA.

In August 2019 he joined Skelmersdale United.

In December 2020 he joined Prestatyn Town.
