= Jake Goodman (footballer) =

English footballer (born 1993)

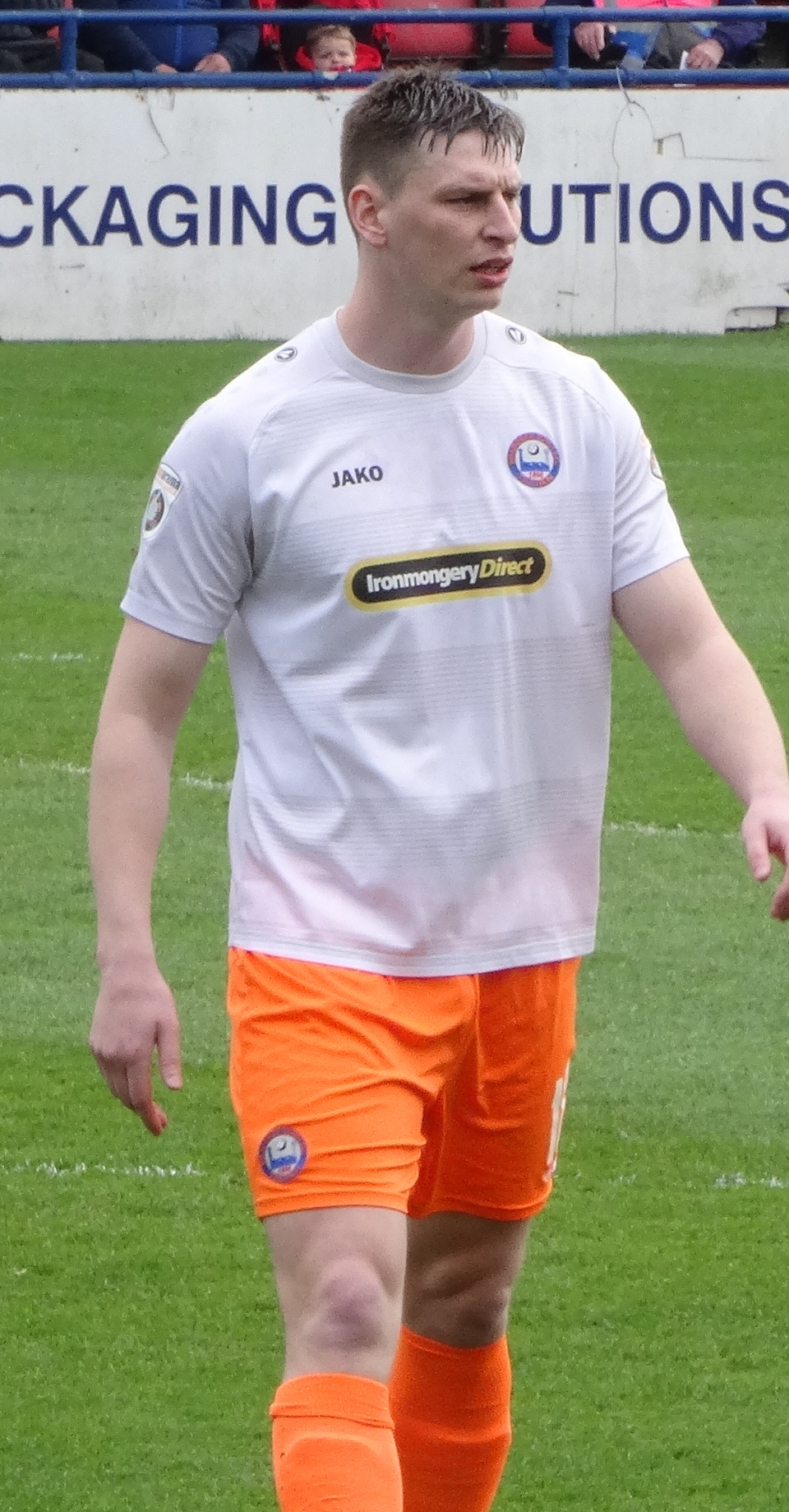
- Goodman playing for Braintree Town in 2017

Personal information
- Full name: Jake Phillip Goodman
- Date of birth: 5 August 1993 (age 33)
- Place of birth: Bexley, England
- Height: 1.93 m (6 ft 4 in)
- Position: Defender

Team information
- Current team: Phoenix Sports (player-manager)

Youth career
- –2011: Millwall

Senior career*
Years	Team	Apps	(Gls)
2011–2015	Millwall	0	(0)
2011–2012	→ Staines Town (loan)	15	(1)
2013	→ Luton Town (loan)	11	(0)
2013–2014	→ Aldershot Town (loan)	21	(1)
2014–2015	→ AFC Wimbledon (loan)	14	(1)
2015–2016	Margate	37	(2)
2016–2017	Braintree Town	25	(1)
2017–2018	Maidenhead United	38	(2)
2018–2020	Bromley	22	(1)
2020–2021	Ebbsfleet United	10	(2)
2021–2023	Dover Athletic	73	(6)
2023–2024	Folkestone Invicta	17	(2)
2023	→ Sittingbourne (loan)	4	(0)
2024	Burgess Hill Town	9	(1)
2024	Hythe Town	5	(1)
2024–2025	Raynes Park Vale	16	(0)
2025–	Phoenix Sports	26	(4)

Managerial career
- 2025–: Phoenix Sports (player-manager)
- * Club domestic league appearances and goals as of 11:40, 4 October 2025 (UTC)

Jake Phillip Goodman (born 5 August 1993) is an English professional footballer who plays as a defender for Southern Counties East League Premier Division club Phoenix Sports where he holds the role of player-manager.

== Career ==
Goodman signed a professional contract with Millwall in 2012 under manager Kenny Jackett, turning down an offer from Premier League side Newcastle United. On 4 March 2013, Goodman signed on loan for Conference side Luton Town making 11 appearances. Goodman then signed on loan for Aldershot Town on 1 August 2013 making 21 appearances and scoring 1 goal. Goodman went on loan to League Two side AFC Wimbledon on 27 November 2014. On 8 January 2015, Goodman extended his loan at Wimbledon until the end of the season.

Goodman joined Braintree Town for the 2016–17 season, and then joined Maidenhead United in June 2017. He joined Bromley for the 2018–19 season. He suffered an anterior cruciate ligament injury which caused him to miss the entire 2019-20 season. For the 2020-21 season, he joined Ebbsfleet United. In June 2021, Goodman joined National League side Dover Athletic. Goodman was offered a new contract following relegation at the end of the 2021–22 season, re-signing two weeks later. He was not one of four players to be retained by the club at the end of the 2022–23 season.

On 1 July 2023, Goodman signed for Isthmian League Premier Division club Folkestone Invicta. Prior to the start of the season, he joined Sittingbourne on a loan deal of undisclosed length. In March 2024, he signed for Burgess Hill Town.

On 29 June 2024, Goodman joined fellow Isthmian League South East Division side Hythe Town. In February 2025, he joined Phoenix Sports following a spell with Raynes Park Vale.

== Coaching career ==
In October 2025, Goodman was appointed player-manager of Southern Counties East Premier Division club Phoenix Sports following a short spell as interim manager.

== Career statistics ==
As of end of 2024–25 season

Appearances and goals by club, season and competition
Club	Season	League			FA Cup		League Cup		Other		Total	
Club	Season	Division	Apps	Goals	Apps	Goals	Apps	Goals	Apps	Goals	Apps	Goals
Staines Town (loan)	2011–12	Conference South	15	1	0	0	—		3 (Note: Appearances in the FA Trophy)	0	18	1
Millwall	2012–13	Championship	0	0	0	0	0	0	—		0	0
Luton Town (loan)	2012–13	Conference Premier	11	0	0	0	—		0	0	11	0
Aldershot Town (loan)	2013–14	Conference Premier	21	1	2	0	—		3	0	26	1
AFC Wimbledon (loan)	2014–15	League Two	14	1	2	0	0	0	0	0	16	1
Margate	2015–16	National League South	37	2	2	0	—		2 (Note: One appearance in the Kent Senior Cup and one in the FA Trophy)	0	41	2
Braintree Town	2016–17	National League	25	1	1	0	—		3	0	29	1
Maidenhead United	2017–18	National League	38	2	1	0	—		4	0	43	2
Bromley	2018–19	National League	22	1	0	0	—		1	0	23	1
Ebbsfleet United	2020–21	National League South	10	2	1	0	—		0	0	11	2
Dover Athletic	2021–22	National League	38	4	1	0	—		1	0	40	4
Dover Athletic	2022–23	National League South	35	2	1	0	—		1	0	37	2
Dover Athletic	Total		73	6	2	0	0	0	2	0	77	6
Folkestone Invicta	2023–24	Isthmian League Premier Division	17	2	0	0	—		0	0	17	2
Sittingbourne (loan)	2023–24	Isthmian League South East Division	4	0	2	0	—		4 (Note: Two appearances in FA Trophy, one appearance in Kent Senior Cup, one appearance in Alan Turvey Trophy)	0	10	0
Hythe Town	2024–25	Isthmian League South East Division	5	1	2	0	—		1	0	8	1
Raynes Park Vale	2024–25	Isthmian League South Central Division	16	0	0	0	—		1 (Note: Appearance(s) in Surrey Senior Cup)	0	17	0
Phoenix Sports	2024–25	Isthmian League South East Division	15	0	0	0	—		0	0	15	0
Career total			321	20	15	0	0	0	24	0	360	20
