= Tamer Tuna (footballer, born 1991) =

Turkish footballer (born 1991)

Personal information
- Full name: Tamer Hakan Tuna
- Date of birth: 19 October 1991 (age 35)
- Place of birth: Bexley, England
- Height: 5 ft 10 in (1.78 m)
- Position: Striker

Team information
- Current team: FC Revolution

Youth career
- ?–2009: Charlton Athletic

Senior career*
Years	Team	Apps	(Gls)
2009–2011	Charlton Athletic	3	(0)
2010	→ Staines Town (loan)	3	(0)
2010	→ Woking (loan)	2	(0)
2010	→ Welling United (loan)	2	(0)
2010	→ Thurrock (loan)	?	(?)
2011	→ Aveley (loan)	?	(?)
2011–2012	Welling United	3	(0)
2012	Cray Wanderers	1	(0)
2012	Hastings United	5	(1)
2012	Erith Town	8	(4)
- FC Revolution

International career
2008	Turkey U19		
- * Club domestic league appearances and goals as of 11:35, 20 April 2012 (UTC)

Tamer Hakan Tuna (pronounced [ˈtameɾ ˈtuna]; born 19 October 1991 in England) is a Turkish footballer who plays as a striker. He is currently a free agent after a short spell at Kent League side Erith Town.

== Career ==
Tuna, who went to Chislehurst and Sidcup Grammar School in Sidcup, joined Charlton Athletic at the age of nine, after a short spell playing for local youth club Parkwood Rangers. He plays as a striker. He made his first team debut for Charlton in a 2–2 draw against Blackpool on 18 April 2009, which confirmed their relegation to League One. Tuna was handed the 28 shirt for the 2009–10 shirt and has seen himself on goal scoring form for the reserves and having a few substitute appearances for the first team. He made his full debut against Barnet on 6 October 2009 in the Football League Trophy, marking his debut with a 40th-minute goal.

Tuna went on a work experience loan to Conference South club Staines Town in January 2010, featuring three times for the club. Later that month, he left Staines and went on loan to another Conference South club, Woking. On 19 March 2010, Tuna was then loaned to fellow Conference South play-off contenders Welling United. Tuna then went on to have further loan spells at Thurrock and Aveley.

Tuna remained on a YTS contract for Charlton Athletic during 2010. However, he was released by the club in May 2011.

He subsequently appeared for Welling United, Cray Wanderers, Hastings United and Erith Town.
