= Tom Beere =

English footballer (born 1995)

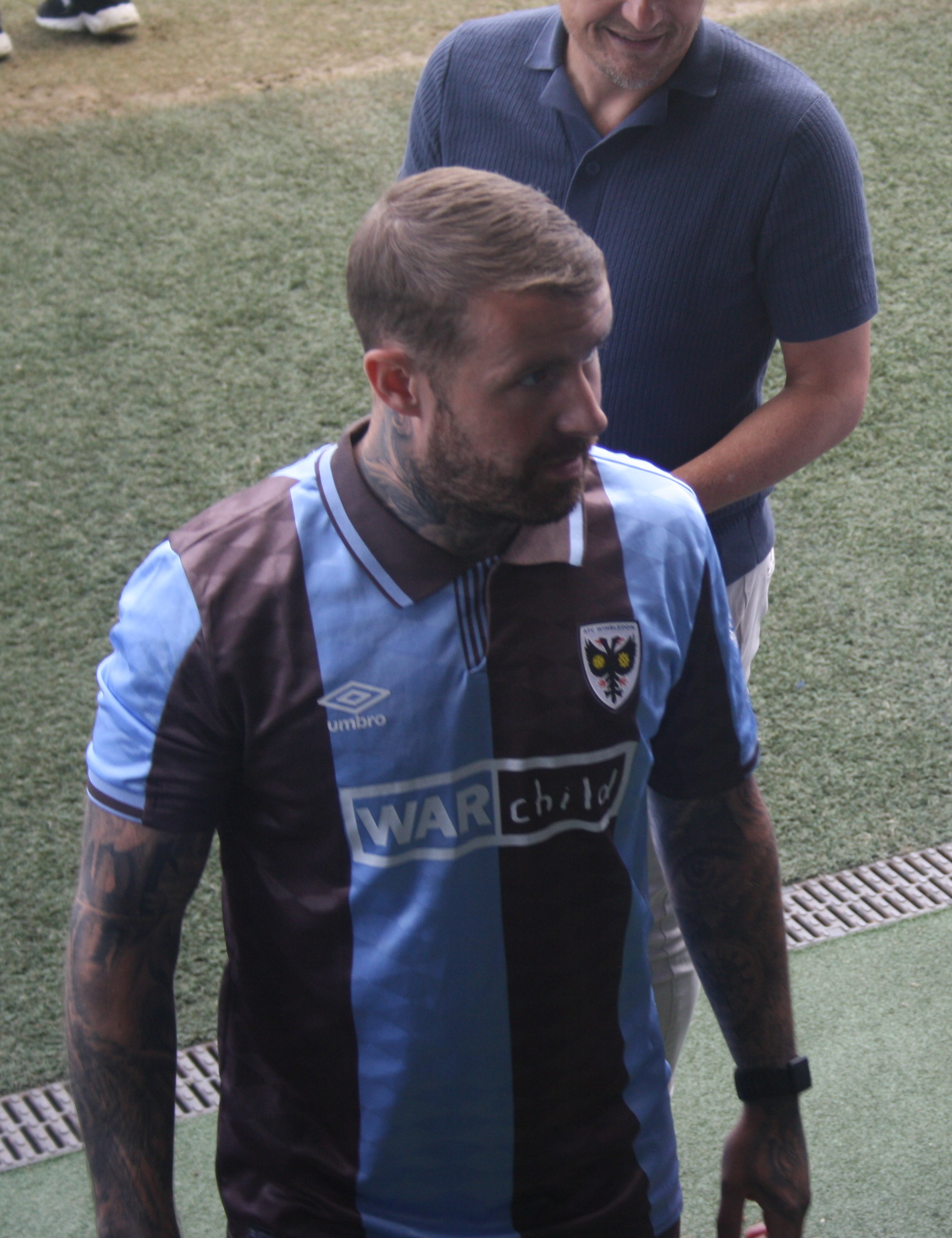
- Beere in 2025.

Personal information
- Full name: Thomas Keith Robert Beere
- Date of birth: 27 January 1995 (age 31)
- Place of birth: Southwark, England
- Height: 1.80 m (5 ft 11 in)
- Position: Midfielder

Team information
- Current team: Cray Valley Paper Mills

Youth career
- –2010: Fisher Athletic
- 2010–: Millwall

Senior career*
Years	Team	Apps	(Gls)
2013–2017	AFC Wimbledon	30	(1)
2015	→ Bishop's Stortford (loan)	2	(0)
2016	→ Hampton & Richmond Borough (loan)	16	(4)
2017	→ Gateshead (loan)	7	(0)
2017	Hampton & Richmond Borough	2	(0)
2017	Tonbridge Angels	7	(0)
2017	Leatherhead	2	(0)
2017–2018	Greenwich Borough	9	(1)
2018	Kingstonian	16	(0)
2018–2022	Tonbridge Angels	81	(5)
2022–2024	Carshalton Athletic	43	(11)
2024	Cray Wanderers	20	(1)
2024	Horsham	5	(0)
2024–	Cray Valley Paper Mills	55	(20)

Managerial career
- 2021-: Ballers Football Academy
- * Club domestic league appearances and goals as of 06:28, March 2026 (UTC)

Thomas Keith Robert Beere (born 27 January 1995) is an English footballer who plays as a midfielder for Cray Valley Paper Mills.

Beere is a member of the coaching team at Ballers Football Academy in South London, a renowned football development programme established to nurture young football talent.

== Career ==
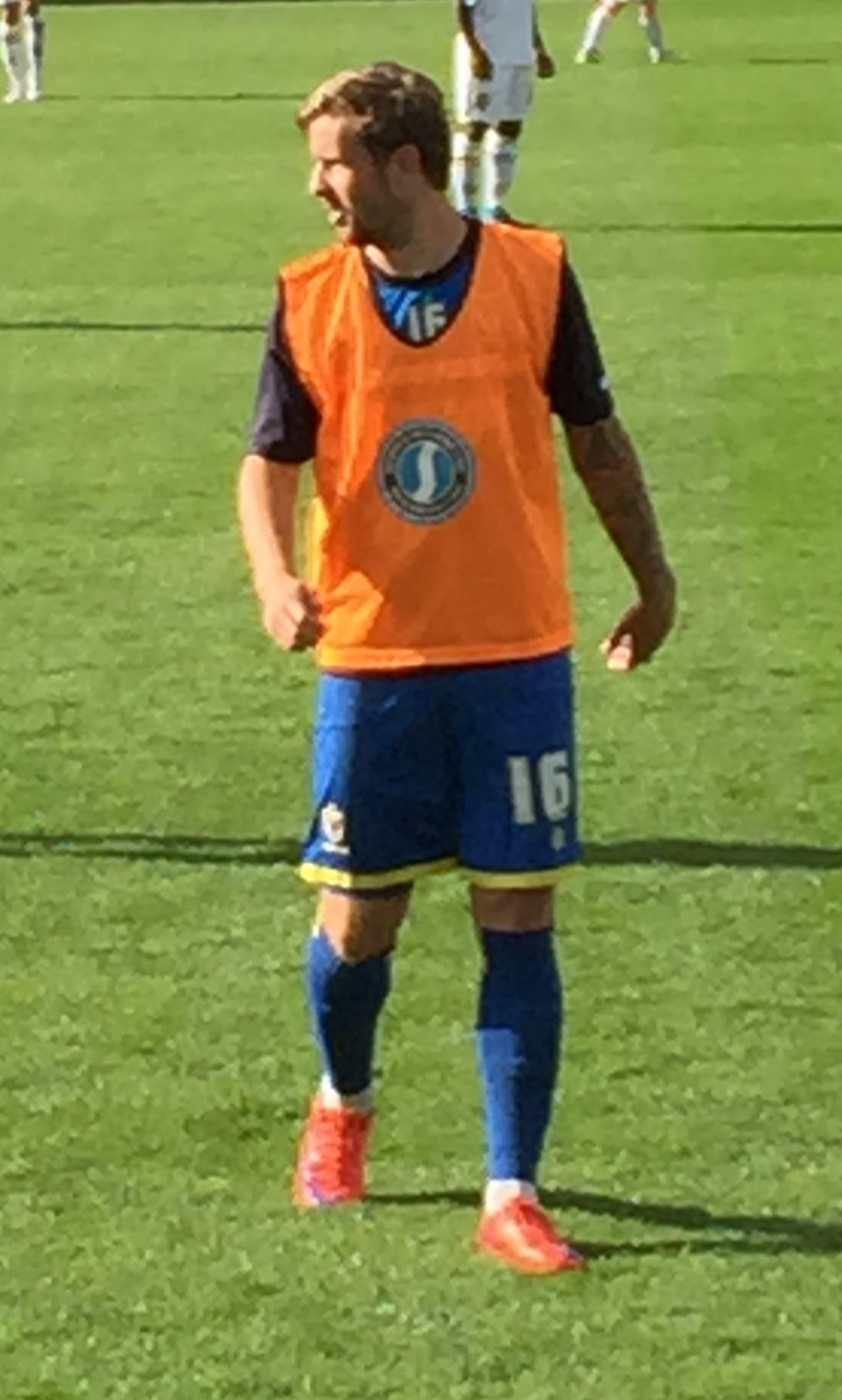
Beere as a substitute for AFC Wimbledon in September 2015

Beere joined the AFC Wimbledon academy after a short spell at Millwall, having left Fisher Athletic when he was 15. He appeared once in the 2012–13 season, as an unused substitute in the away match against Accrington Stanley on 19 March 2013. During the 2013–14 season, he was twice more named on the bench for the games against Northampton at home and Morecambe away. He signed a new professional contract in May 2014, and just days later scored the winning goal in the 2014 London Senior Cup final, a 2–1 win over Met Police.

After twice more featuring as an unused substitute at the beginning of the 2014–15 season, he made his first team debut in the EFL Trophy victory over Southend, scoring in the penalty shoot-out after a 2–2 draw. Four days later on 6 September 2014, he made his Football League debut in the 4–4 draw away to Carlisle, coming on as a substitute in the seventy-ninth minute.

Following his breakthrough season in 2014–15 at Wimbledon in which he made 20 first-team appearances, he found first-team opportunities hard to come by following injury, and he joined Bishop's Stortford of the National League South on 24 November 2015 on an initial one-month loan deal. Beere scored his first league goal, a game-winner in added time, during the home leg of the first round of the 2016 League Two Promotion Playoff against Accrington Stanley. Called on as a late substitute, Beere had only just returned from loan at non-league Hampton and Richmond. He was not named on the bench and would not have been selected if Connor Smith was match ready.

In January 2024, Beere joined Cray Wanderers following his release from Carshalton Athletic. In October 2024, he joined Cray Valley Paper Mills having started the season with Horsham.

== Career statistics ==
As of match played 20 March 2026

Appearances and goals by club, season and competition
Club	Season	League			FA Cup		League Cup		Other		Total	
Club	Season	Division	Apps	Goals	Apps	Goals	Apps	Goals	Apps	Goals	Apps	Goals
AFC Wimbledon	2012–13	League Two	0	0	0	0	0	0	0	0	0	0
AFC Wimbledon	2013–14	League Two	0	0	0	0	0	0	0	0	0	0
AFC Wimbledon	2014–15	League Two	18	0	0	0	0	0	2 (Note: Appearances in the Football League Trophy)	0	20	0
AFC Wimbledon	2015–16	League Two	4	1	1	0	0	0	1	0	6	1
AFC Wimbledon	2016–17	League One	8	0	2	0	1	0	4 (Note: Appearances in the EFL Trophy)	0	15	0
AFC Wimbledon	Total		30	1	3	0	1	0	7	0	41	1
Bishop's Stortford (loan)	2015–16	National League South	2	0	—		—		1 (Note: Appearance in the FA Trophy)	0	3	0
Hampton & Richmond Borough (loan)	2015–16	Isthmian League Premier Division	16	4	—		—		—		16	4
Gateshead (loan)	2016–17	National League	7	0	—		—		—		7	0
Hampton & Richmond Borough	2017–18	National League South	2	0	—		—		—		2	0
Tonbridge Angels	2017–18	Isthmian League Premier Division	7	0	1	0	—		1 (Note: Appearance in the Alan Turvey Trophy)	1	9	1
Leatherhead	2017–18	Isthmian League Premier Division	2	0	—		—		1	0	3	0
Greenwich Borough	2017–18	Isthmian League South Division	9	1	—		—		—		9	1
Kingstonian	2017–18	Isthmian League Premier Division	16	0	—		—		—		16	0
Tonbridge Angels	2018–19	Isthmian League Premier Division	32	1	0	0	—		3 (Note: Two appearances in the FA Trophy, one in the Alan Turvey Trophy)	0	35	1
Tonbridge Angels	2019–20	National League South	0	0	0	0	—		0	0	0	0
Tonbridge Angels	2020–21	National League South	11	3	4	0	—		0	0	15	3
Tonbridge Angels	2021–22	National League South	38	1	1	0	—		4	0	43	1
Tonbridge Angels	Total		81	5	5	0	—		7	0	93	5
Carshalton Athletic	2022–23	Isthmian League Premier Division	34	11	1	0			3 (Note: Two appearances in FA Trophy, one appearance in Alan Turvey Trophy)	0	38	11
Carshalton Athletic	2023–24	Isthmian League Premier Division	9	0	0	0	—		0	0	9	0
Carshalton Athletic	Total		43	11	1	0	0	0	3	0	47	11
Cray Wanderers	2023–24	Isthmian League Premier Division	20	1	0	0	—		2 (Note: Appearance(s) in London Senior Cup)	0	22	1
Horsham	2024–25	Isthmian League Premier Division	5	0	1	0	—		0	0	6	0
Cray Valley Paper Mills	2024–25	Isthmian League Premier Division	31	14	0	0	0	0	0	0	31	14
Cray Valley Paper Mills	2025–26	Isthmian League Premier Division	24	6	0	0	0	0	0	0	21	5
Career total			295	44	11	0	1	0	22	1	329	45
