= 2015–16 AFC Wimbledon season =

AFC Wimbledon
2015–16 season
- Chairman: Erik Samuelson
- Manager: Neal Ardley
- Stadium: Kingsmeadow
- League Two: 7th (promoted to League One via play-offs)
- FA Cup: First Round (vs Forest Green Rovers)
- League Cup: First Round (vs Cardiff City)
- League Trophy: First Round (vs Plymouth Argyle)
- Top goalscorer: League: Lyle Taylor 20; All: Lyle Taylor 23
- Highest home attendance: 4,870 vs Accrington Stanley (Play-off Semi-final First Leg 14 May 2016)
- Lowest home attendance: 3,525 vs Northampton Town (29 September 2015)
- Average home league attendance: 4,138
Home colours	Away colours	Third colours

The 2015–16 season was AFC Wimbledon's 14th season in their history and 5th consecutive season in League Two. Despite getting the season off to a mediocre start, good spells of form in the latter half of the season ensured that The Dons would confirm their highest ever League Two finish with 7th place and qualification to the 2016 Football League play-offs. AFC Wimbledon went on to beat 4th placed Accrington Stanley 3–2 on aggregate, earning them a place in the play-off Final at Wembley Stadium against Plymouth Argyle. The Dons went on to win the play-off final on 30 May 2016 in front of a crowd of 57,956, earning them promotion to Football League One for the first time in their history.

== League table ==
Pos	Team	Pld	W	D	L	GF	GA	GD	Pts	Promotion, qualification or relegation
5	Plymouth Argyle	46	24	9	13	72	46	+26	81	Qualification for League Two play-offs (Note: Four teams play for one spot and promotion to Football League One.)
6	Portsmouth	46	21	15	10	75	44	+31	78	Qualification for League Two play-offs
7	AFC Wimbledon (O, P)	46	21	12	13	64	50	+14	75	Qualification for League Two play-offs
8	Leyton Orient	46	19	12	15	60	61	−1	69	
9	Cambridge United	46	18	14	14	66	55	+11	68	

Updated to match(es) played on 7 May 2016. Source: BBC Sport
Rules for classification: 1) Points; 2) Goal difference; 3) Number of goals scored
(O) Play-off winners; (P) Promoted

=== Results summary ===
Round	1	2	3	4	5	6	7	8	9	10	11	12	13	14	15	16	17	18	19	20	21	22	23	24	25	26	27	28	29	30	31	32	33	34	35	36	37	38	39	40	41	42	43	44	45	46
Ground	H	A	H	A	H	A	A	H	A	H	H	A	H	A	A	H	A	H	H	A	H	A	H	A	A	H	A	H	H	A	H	H	A	H	A	A	H	A	A	A	H	A	H	H	A	H
Result	L	W	L	D	W	D	D	W	L	D	W	L	L	W	W	W	D	D	L	D	L	D	D	W	W	W	W	L	W	W	W	L	D	D	L	L	W	L	W	W	W	W	W	L	D	W
Position	21	11	14	16	12	13	14	12	15	16	13	14	16	14	12	10	9	8	11	12	14	14	13	12	10	8	7	10	10	10	5	8	8	7	7	9	9	9	9	7	7	7	7	7	7	7

Updated to match(es) played on 7 May 2016. Source: BBC Sport
A = Away; H = Home; W = Win; D = Draw; L = Loss

Overall								Home						Away					
Pld	W	D	L	GF	GA	GD	Pts	W	D	L	GF	GA	GD	W	D	L	GF	GA	GD
46	21	12	13	64	50	+14	75	11	4	8	30	25	+5	10	8	5	34	25	+9

Last updated: 7 May 2016.
Source: BBC Sport

== Matches ==
=== Pre-season friendlies ===
11 July 2015 Friendly	AFC Wimbledon	2–2	Watford	Kingsmeadow
15:00 BST	Kennedy 12' (pen.); Francomb 90' (pen.)	Report	Ighalo 34'; Forestieri 52'

14 July 2015 Friendly	Basingstoke Town	1–3	AFC Wimbledon	The Camrose
19:45 BST	Flood 46'	Report	Taylor 78' 84' 89'

18 July 2015 Friendly	AFC Wimbledon	1–1	Millwall	Kingsmeadow
15:00 BST	Taylor 15'	Report	Nelson 90'

30 July 2015 Rob Tolfrey Testimonial	Kingstonian	1–1	AFC Wimbledon	Kingsmeadow
19:45 GMT	Hudson 66'	Report	Pilbeam 51'	Attendance: 504

1 August 2015 Friendly	AFC Wimbledon	3–1	Cheltenham Town	Kingsmeadow
15:00 BST	Robinson; Taylor; Akinfenwa	Report	Wright

=== League Two ===
==== August ====
8 August 2015 1	AFC Wimbledon	0–2	Plymouth Argyle	Kingsmeadow
15:00 BST	Fuller (yellow card) 90+2'	BBC Report	Wylde 40'; Carey 49'	Attendance: 4,805; Referee: Ben Toner

15 August 2015 2	Crawley Town	1–2	AFC Wimbledon	Broadfield Stadium
15:00 BST	Edwards 34' (yellow card) 80'; Walton (yellow card) 68'; Donnelly (yellow card) 88'	BBC Report	Akinfenwa 51'; Taylor (yellow card) 74'; Barcham 76'	Attendance: 2,988; Referee: Dean Whitestone

18 August 2015 3	AFC Wimbledon	1–2	Cambridge United	Kingsmeadow
19:45 BST	Elliott 12'; Fuller (yellow card) 70'; Reeves (yellow card) 80'	BBC Report	L. Hughes (yellow card) 45'; Legge 46'; Corr 48'	Attendance: 4,114; Referee: Andy Woolmer

22 August 2015 4	Carlisle United	1–1	AFC Wimbledon	Brunton Park
15:00 BST	Ibehre 67'; Grainger (yellow card) 71'; Miller (yellow card) 76'; Raynes (yellow card) 90+2'	BBC Report	Barcham 36'; Osborne (yellow card) 88'	Attendance: 5,949; Referee: Darren Drysdale

29 August 2015 5	AFC Wimbledon	2–1	Exeter City	Kingsmeadow
15:00 BST	Francomb 28'; Azeez 82'; Beere (yellow card) 90+2'	BBC Report	Harley 33'; Noble (yellow card) 56'	Attendance: 3,803; Referee: Darren England

==== September ====
5 September 2015 6	Mansfield Town	1–1	AFC Wimbledon	Field Mill
15:00 BST	Clements 15'; Chapman (yellow card) 51'; Rose (yellow card) 55'; Green (yellow card) 73'; Hunt (yellow card) 79'	BBC Report	Elliott 6'; Robinson (yellow card) 15'; Francomb (yellow card) 45+2'; Taylor (red card) 90+4'	Attendance: 3,042; Referee: Ross Joyce

12 September 2015 7	Yeovil Town	1–1	AFC Wimbledon	Huish Park
15:00 BST	Bird 26'	BBC Report	Nightingale (yellow card) 50'; Akinfenwa 79'	Attendance: 3,687; Referee: Lee Swabey

19 September 2015 8	AFC Wimbledon	2–1	Notts County	Kingsmeadow
15:00 BST	Fuller (yellow card) 79'; Bulman 85'; Francomb (yellow card) 88'; Akinfenwa 90'	BBC Report	Amevor (yellow card) 11'; Hollis 16'; Swerts (yellow card) 45+2'; Snijders (yellow card) 68'; Burke (yellow card) 82'	Attendance: 3,962; Referee: Andy Davies

26 September 2015 9	Luton Town	2–0	AFC Wimbledon	Kenilworth Road
15:00 BST	Marriott 79' 90'; McCourt (yellow card) 89'	BBC Report	Osborne (yellow card) 30' (yellow card) 35' (red card)	Attendance: 8,415; Referee: Brendan Malone

29 September 2015 10	AFC Wimbledon	1–1	Northampton Town	Kingsmeadow
19:45 BST	Azeez 24'; Ajayi (yellow card) 66'; Robinson (yellow card) 75'	BBC Report	O'Toole 35'	Attendance: 3,525; Referee: Andy Haines

==== October ====
3 October 2015 11	AFC Wimbledon	2–0	Barnet	Kingsmeadow
15:00 BST	Taylor 7'; Rigg 90+4'	BBC Report	Yiadom (yellow card) 50'; McLean (yellow card) 60'	Attendance: 4,068; Referee: Gavin Ward

10 October 2015 12	Oxford United	1–0	AFC Wimbledon	Kassam Stadium
15:00 BST	Skarz (yellow card) 67'; Baldock 80'; Mullins (yellow card) 90'	BBC Report	Fuller (yellow card) 45+5'; Meades (yellow card) 62'	Attendance: 6,301; Referee: Fred Graham

17 October 2015 13	AFC Wimbledon	2–5	Morecambe	Kingsmeadow
14:00 BST	Barcham 3'; Taylor (yellow card) 44'; Akinfenwa (yellow card) 45+8' (goal) 49'; Reeves (yellow card) 76'	BBC Report	Miller 8' pen.' (13); Kenyon (yellow card) 15'; Goodall (yellow card) 17' (goal) 45+9'; Devitt (yellow card) 21'; Ellison (yellow card) 55'; Barkhuizen 80'; Mullin 90'	Attendance: 3,679; Referee: Trevor Kettle

20 October 2015 14	Accrington Stanley	3–4	AFC Wimbledon	Crown Ground
19:45 BST	Kee 5' 10'; McConville 36'; Gornell (yellow card) 45+4'	BBC Report	Bulman 19' 44'; Taylor 25' 64'; Fuller (yellow card) 90+4'	Attendance: 1,315; Referee: Mark Brown

24 October 2015 15	York City	1–3	AFC Wimbledon	Bootham Crescent
15:00 BST	Oliver 60'; Godfrey (yellow card) 88'	BBC Report	Azeez 15'; Taylor 65'; Elliott 85'	Attendance: 3,000; Referee: Nigel Miller

31 October 2015 16	AFC Wimbledon	2–0	Hartlepool United	Kingsmeadow
14:00 GMT	Kennedy 18'; Taylor 28'	BBC Report	Carroll (yellow card) 23'; Oyenuga (yellow card) 75'; Fenwick (yellow card) 85'	Attendance: 3,638; Referee: Lee Collins

==== November ====
15 November 2015 17	Portsmouth	0–0	AFC Wimbledon	Fratton Park
14:30 GMT		BBC Report	Reeves (yellow card) 90+1'	Attendance: 15,892; Referee: Stuart Attwell

21 November 2015 18	AFC Wimbledon	1–1	Wycombe Wanderers	Kingsmeadow
15:00 GMT	Osborne (yellow card) 27'; Taylor (yellow card) 80'; Azeez 90+1'	BBC Report	O'Nien (yellow card) 24'; McCarthy 51'; Stewart (yellow card) 89'	Attendance: 4,482; Referee: Phil Gibbs

24 November 2015 19	AFC Wimbledon	0–1	Dagenham & Redbridge	Kingsmeadow
19:45 GMT		BBC Report	Cureton 80'	Attendance: 3,557; Referee: Simon Hooper

28 November 2015 20	Leyton Orient	1–1	AFC Wimbledon	Brisbane Road
15:00 GMT	Simpson 10'; Mvoto (yellow card) 12'; Marquis (yellow card) 12' (yellow card) 58' (red card); Cisak (yellow card) 90+5'	BBC Report	Reeves (yellow card) 17'; Fuller (yellow card) 39'; Akinfenwa 80'; Elliott (yellow card) 89'	Attendance: 6,024; Referee: Darren Handley

==== December ====
12 December 2015 21	AFC Wimbledon	1–2	Stevenage	Kingsmeadow
15:00 GMT	Osborne (yellow card) 14'; Francomb 43'	BBC Report	Matt 57'; Okimo 76'	Attendance: 3,846; Referee: Nick Kinseley

19 December 2015 22	Newport County	2–2	AFC Wimbledon	Rodney Parade
15:00 GMT	Rodman 14'; Robinson 30' (o.g.)	BBC Report	Taylor 46' 79'; Bulman (yellow card) 79'	Attendance: 2,798; Referee: Kevin Johnson

26 December 2015 23	AFC Wimbledon	0–0	Bristol Rovers	Kingsmeadow
15:00 GMT	Robinson (red card) 4'; Reeves (yellow card) 60'; Taylor (yellow card) 76'	BBC Sport	Leadbitter (yellow card) 83'	Attendance: 4,668; Referee: Keith Hill

28 December 2015 24	Exeter City	0–2	AFC Wimbledon	St James Park
15:00 GMT	Tillson (yellow card) 54'; Woodman (yellow card) 76'	BBC Report	Elliott 17'; Taylor 31'; Meades (yellow card) 77'	Attendance: 5,072; Referee: Lee Swabey

==== January ====
2 January 2016 25	Cambridge United	1–4	AFC Wimbledon	Abbey Stadium
15:00 GMT	Berry 26'; Roberts (yellow card) 70'	BBC Report	Robinson 10'; Taylor 64'; Meades 76'; Fuller (yellow card) 85'; Azeez 86'	Attendance: 5,754; Referee: Tony Harrington

16 January 2016 26	AFC Wimbledon	3–1	Mansfield Town	Kingsmeadow
15:00 GMT	Osborne (yellow card) 10'; Taylor 49'; Meades (yellow card) 49' (goal) 78'; Azeez (yellow card) 82' (goal) 87'	BBC Report	Green 11'	Attendance: 4,089; Referee: Fred Graham

23 January 2016 27	Notts County	0–2	AFC Wimbledon	Meadow Lane
15:00 GMT	Milsom (yellow card) 45+2'	BBC Report	Elliott 9'; Rigg (yellow card) 59'; Barcham 83'	Attendance: 5,301; Referee: Seb Stockbridge

30 January 2016 28	AFC Wimbledon	2–3	Yeovil Town	Kingsmeadow
15:00 GMT	Fitzpatrick 9'; Elliott 29'; Osborne (yellow card) 34'; Azeez (yellow card) 90+2'	BBC Report	Compton 12' 35' 63' (pen.)	Attendance: 4,525; Referee: Darren England

==== February ====
13 February 2016 29	AFC Wimbledon	4–1	Luton Town	Kingsmeadow
15:00 GMT	Marriott 23' (o.g.); Taylor 25' 49'; Rigg 47'	BBC Report	Benson (yellow card) 38'; Marriott 59'; McGeehan (yellow card) 75'	Attendance: 4,439; Referee: Christopher Sarginson

20 February 2016 30	Barnet	1–2	AFC Wimbledon	The Hive Stadium
15:00 GMT	Stevens 87'	BBC Report	Taylor 46'; Azeez 85'; Meades (yellow card) 90+2'	Attendance: 3,289; Referee: Lee Collins

23 February 2016 31	AFC Wimbledon	1–0	Carlisle United	Kingsmeadow
19:45 GMT	Robinson 53'	BBC Report	Gillespie (red card) 50'; Comley (yellow card) 79'	Attendance: 3,526; Referee: Darren Deadman

27 February 2016 32	AFC Wimbledon	1–2	Oxford United	Kingsmeadow
15:00 GMT	Barcham 33'; Sweeney (yellow card) 63'; Taylor (yellow card) 89'	BBC Report	Hylton 5'; Bowery 59'; Kenny (yellow card) 85'	Attendance: 4,628; Referee: Kevin Wright

==== March ====
1 March 2016 33	Northampton Town	1–1	AFC Wimbledon	Sixfields Stadium
19:45 GMT	Prosser (yellow card) 27'; O'Toole 45'	BBC Report	Elliott (yellow card) 21'; Taylor 62'; Meades (yellow card) 70'; Fuller (yellow card) 90+2'	Attendance: 5,124; Referee: Phil Gibbs

5 March 2016 34	AFC Wimbledon	0–0	Accrington Stanley	Kingsmeadow
15:00 GMT	Elliott (yellow card) 62'; Meades (yellow card) 83'; Fuller (yellow card) 90+7'; Sweeney (yellow card) 90+8'	BBC Report	McConville (yellow card) 81'; Etheridge (red card) 87'; Crooks (yellow card) 90+8'	Attendance: 3,627; Referee: Dean Whitestone

8 March 2016 35	Bristol Rovers	3–1	AFC Wimbledon	Memorial Stadium
19:45 GMT	Easter 28'; Clarke 38'; Taylor 78'	BBC Report	Meades 52' (yellow card) 59'; Reeves (yellow card) 74'	Attendance: 7,778; Referee: Ben Toner

12 March 2016 36	Morecambe	2–1	AFC Wimbledon	Globe Arena
15:00 GMT	Fleming 76' (yellow card) 77'; Devitt 80' (pen.)	BBC Report	Meades (yellow card) 72'; Sweeney (red card) 79'; Reeves (yellow card) 83'; Francomb 90'	Attendance: 1,477; Referee: Geoff Eltringham

19 March 2016 37	AFC Wimbledon	2–1	York City	Kingsmeadow
15:00 GMT	Barcham (yellow card) 52'; Murphy 68'; Reeves 90+3'	BBC Report	Šatka (yellow card) 55'; Penn 38'	Attendance: 3,883; Referee: Robert Lewis

25 March 2016 38	Hartlepool United	1–0	AFC Wimbledon	Victoria Park
15:00 GMT	Jackson 22'	BBC Report		Attendance: 4,365; Referee: Darren Deadman

==== April ====
2 April 2016 39	Wycombe Wanderers	1–2	AFC Wimbledon	Adams Park
15:00 GMT	Harriman 58' (yellow card) 90'	BBC Report	Taylor 12' 66' (pen.); Bulman (yellow card) 72'; Azeez (yellow card) 81'; Fuller (yellow card) 90+4'; Meades (yellow card) 90+6'	Attendance: 4,560; Referee: Brendan Malone

9 April 2016 40	Plymouth Argyle	1–2	AFC Wimbledon	Home Park
15:00 GMT	Carey 61'	BBC Report	Taylor 30'; Akinfenwa 88'	Attendance: 8,852; Referee: Darren Drysdale

16 April 2016 41	AFC Wimbledon	1–0	Crawley Town	Kingsmeadow
15:00 GMT	Smith (yellow card) 61'; Meades (yellow card) 61'; Robinson 83'	BBC Report	Della Verde (yellow card) 83'; Dunne (yellow card) 89'	Attendance: 4,356; Referee: Tim Robinson

19 April 2016 42	Dagenham & Redbridge	0–2	AFC Wimbledon	Victoria Road
19:45 GMT	Labadie (yellow card) 36'; Cash (yellow card) 82'	BBC Report	Taylor 33' 61'	Attendance: 2,027; Referee: Andy Haines

23 April 2016 43	AFC Wimbledon	1–0	Leyton Orient	Kingsmeadow
15:00 GMT	Taylor 17'	BBC Report		Attendance: 4,732; Referee: Graham Salisbury

26 April 2016 44	AFC Wimbledon	0–1	Portsmouth	Kingsmeadow
19:45 GMT	Elliott (yellow card) 31'; Robinson (yellow card) 53'; Smith (yellow card) 89'	BBC Report	Roberts (yellow card) 24'; Smith (yellow card) 27' (goal) 35'	Attendance: 4,799; Referee: Andy Madley

30 April 2016 45	Stevenage	0–0	AFC Wimbledon	Broadhall Way
15:00 GMT	Tonge (yellow card) 10'	BBC Report	Robinson (yellow card) 48'	Attendance: 4,011; Referee: Charles Breakspear

==== May ====
7 May 2016 46	AFC Wimbledon	1–0	Newport County	Kingsmeadow
15:00 GMT	Olusanya 80' (pen.)	BBC Report		Attendance: 4,427; Referee: Geoff Eltringham

=== League Two play-offs ===
==== Semi-final ====
14 May 2016 1st Leg	AFC Wimbledon	1–0	Accrington Stanley	Kingsmeadow
19:30 GMT	Beere 90+3'	BBC Report		Attendance: 4,870; Referee: Steve Martin

18 May 2016 2nd Leg	Accrington Stanley	2–2 (a.e.t.) (2–3 agg.)	AFC Wimbledon	Crown Ground
19:45 GMT	Windass 39' (pen.) (yellow card) 103'; Mingoia 59'; Davies (yellow card) 119'	BBC Report	Akinfenwa 68' (yellow card) 105+3'; Charles (yellow card) 90+2'; Fuller (yellow card) 92'; Taylor 104'	Attendance: 4,634; Referee: Eddie Ilderton

==== Final ====
30 May 2016 Final	AFC Wimbledon	2–0	Plymouth Argyle	Wembley Stadium
15:00 GMT	Charles (yellow card) 67'; Taylor 78' (yellow card) 78'; Akinfenwa 90+11' (pen.) (yellow card) 90+11'	BBC Report	Wylde (yellow card) 62'; Sawyer (yellow card) 76'	Attendance: 57,956; Referee: Iain Williamson

=== FA Cup ===
7 November 2015 First round	AFC Wimbledon	1–2	Forest Green Rovers	Kingsmeadow
15:00 GMT	Kennedy 24'; Toonga (yellow card) 86'; Rigg (yellow card) 90+2'	BBC Report	Carter 6'; Racine (yellow card) 69'; Frear 90+3'	Attendance: 2,465; Referee: Graham Horwood

=== League Cup ===
11 August 2015 First round	Cardiff City	1–0	AFC Wimbledon	Cardiff City Stadium
19:45 BST	Noone 45+1'	BBC Report	Meades (yellow card) 26'	Attendance: 6,314; Referee: Brendan Malone

=== Football League Trophy ===
1 September 2015 First round	AFC Wimbledon	2–3	Plymouth Argyle	Kingsmeadow
19:45 BST	Azeez 7'; Taylor 25'	BBC Report	Jervis 38'; Brunt 54'; McHugh 57' (yellow card) 81'; Mellor (yellow card) 80'	Attendance: 1,251; Referee: Charles Breakspear

=== London Senior Cup ===
On 8 February 2016, it was announced that AFC Wimbledon had decided to withdraw from the competition after being unable to agree with Second Round opponents London Bari on a suitable date to play the match after the original fixture had been cancelled on 9 January due to a waterlogged pitch.

2 November 2015 First round	Thamesmead Town	1−3	AFC Wimbledon	Bayliss Avenue
19:45 GMT	Duncan 21'	Wimbledon Report	Olusanya 64'; Gallagher 79'; Egan 89'

== Player statistics ==
=== League Appearances and goals ===
As of 31 May 2016

No.	Pos	Nat	Player	Total		League Two		FA Cup		League Cup		JP Trophy	
No.	Pos	Nat	Player	Apps	Goals	Apps	Goals	Apps	Goals	Apps	Goals	Apps	Goals
1	GK	(England) ENG	James Shea	23	0	21	0	0	0	1	0	1	0
2	DF	(England) ENG	Barry Fuller (Captain)	48	0	45	0	1	0	1	0	1	0
4	MF	(England) ENG	Dannie Bulman	44	3	39+3	3	1	0	1	0	0	0
5	DF	(England) ENG	Will Nightingale	6	0	3+1	0	0	0	1	0	1	0
6	DF	(England) ENG	Paul Robinson	46	3	44	3	1	0	1	0	0	0
7	MF	(England) ENG	George Francomb	42	3	36+4	3	0	0	1	0	0+1	0
8	MF	(England) ENG	Jake Reeves	43	1	40+1	1	1	0	0	0	1	0
9	FW	(England) ENG	Tom Elliott	42	6	26+14	6	1	0	1	0	0	0
12	DF	(Wales) WAL	Jonathan Meades	43	3	40+1	3	1	0	1	0	0	0
14	FW	(England) ENG	Adebayo Azeez	45	8	9+33	7	0+1	0	0+1	0	1	1
15	FW	(England) ENG	George Oakley	1	0	0+1	0	0	0	0	0	0	0
16	MF	(England) ENG	Tom Beere	4	0	1+1	0	0+1	0	0	0	1	0
17	MF	(England) ENG	Andy Barcham	36	5	32+2	5	0	0	0+1	0	1	0
18	MF	(Republic of Ireland) IRL	Connor Smith	10	0	7+3	0	0	0	0	0	0	0
19	MF	(England) ENG	David Fitzpatrick	5	1	2+2	1	0	0	0	0	0+1	0
20	DF	(Republic of Ireland) IRL	Ryan Sweeney	10	0	10	0	0	0	0	0	0	0
21	DF	(England) ENG	George Pilbeam	0	0	0	0	0	0	0	0	0	0
24	GK	(England) ENG	Joe McDonnell	0	0	0	0	0	0	0	0	0	0
25	MF	(England) ENG	Dan Gallagher	1	0	0	0	0	0	0	0	0+1	0
26	FW	(Albania) ALB	Egli Kaja	2	0	0+2	0	0	0	0	0	0	0
27	DF	(England) ENG	Callum Wilson	0	0	0	0	0	0	0	0	0	0
32	DF	(England) ENG	Darius Charles	9	0	9	0	0	0	0	0	0	0
33	FW	(Montserrat) MSR	Lyle Taylor	45	21	38+4	20	1	0	1	0	1	1
34	DF	(England) ENG	Paul Kalambayi	0	0	0	0	0	0	0	0	0	0
35	FW	(England) ENG	Toyosi Olusanya	1	1	0+1	1	0	0	0	0	0	0
Players who featured on loan for AFC Wimbledon but subsequently returned to their parent club:
18	DF	(Nigeria) NGA	Semi Ajayi	5	0	5	0	0	0	0	0	0	0
22	DF	(England) ENG	Karleigh Osborne	25	0	21+2	0	1	0	0	0	1	0
29	GK	(Netherlands) NED	Kelle Roos	17	0	17	0	0	0	0	0	0	0
31	GK	(England) ENG	Ben Wilson	9	0	8	0	1	0	0	0	0	0
39	FW	(Republic of Ireland) IRL	Rhys Murphy	6	1	5+1	1	0	0	0	0	0	0
Players who left or were released by AFC Wimbledon during the course of the season:
3	DF	(England) ENG	Callum Kennedy	20	2	10+8	1	1	1	1	0	0	0
10	FW	(England) ENG	Adebayo Akinfenwa	39	6	19+19	6	0	0	1	0	0	0
11	FW	(England) ENG	Sean Rigg	41	2	18+21	2	0	0	1	0	1	0
23	DF	(England) ENG	Ben Harrison	1	0	0	0	0	0	0	0	1	0
28	MF	(England) ENG	Christian Toonga	5	0	2+2	0	0+1	0	0	0	0	0

=== Play-off Appearances ===
As of 28 September 2017

No.	Pos	Nat	Player	Total		Semi-final 1		Semi-final 2		Final	
No.	Pos	Nat	Player	Apps	Goals	Apps	Goals	Apps	Goals	Apps	Goals
2	DF	(England) ENG	Barry Fuller (Captain)	3	0	1	0	1	0	1	0
3	DF	(England) ENG	Callum Kennedy	3	0	1	0	1	0	1	0
4	MF	(England) ENG	Dannie Bulman	3	0	1	0	1	0	1	0
6	DF	(England) ENG	Paul Robinson	3	0	1	0	1	0	1	0
8	MF	(England) ENG	Jake Reeves	3	0	1	0	1	0	1	0
9	FW	(England) ENG	Tom Elliott	3	0	1	0	1	0	1	0
10	FW	(England) ENG	Adebayo Akinfenwa	3	2	0+1	0	0+1	1	0+1	1
11	FW	(England) ENG	Sean Rigg	2	0	1	0	1	0	0	0
12	DF	(Wales) WAL	Jonathan Meades	1	0	0	0	0	0	0+1	0
14	FW	(England) ENG	Adebayo Azeez	3	0	0+1	0	0+1	0	0+1	0
16	MF	(England) ENG	Tom Beere	2	1	0+1	1	0+1	0	0	0
17	MF	(England) ENG	Andy Barcham	3	0	1	0	1	0	1	0
29	GK	(Netherlands) NED	Kelle Roos	3	0	1	0	1	0	1	0
32	DF	(England) ENG	Darius Charles	3	0	1	0	1	0	1	0
33	FW	(Montserrat) MSR	Lyle Taylor	3	2	1	0	1	1	1	1

=== Top scorers ===
Rank	Position	Nation	Number	Player	League Two	Play-offs	FA Cup	League Cup	JP Trophy	Total
1	FW	(Montserrat)	33	Lyle Taylor	20	2	0	0	1	23
2	FW	(England)	14	Adebayo Azeez	7	0	0	0	1	8
=	FW	(England)	10	Adebayo Akinfenwa	6	2	0	0	0	8
3	FW	(England)	9	Tom Elliott	6	0	0	0	0	6
4	MF	(England)	17	Andy Barcham	5	0	0	0	0	5
5	MF	(England)	4	Dannie Bulman	3	0	0	0	0	3
5	DF	(England)	6	Paul Robinson	3	0	0	0	0	3
5	MF	(England)	7	George Francomb	3	0	0	0	0	3
5	DF	(Wales)	12	Jonathan Meades	3	0	0	0	0	3
6	FW	(England)	11	Sean Rigg	2	0	0	0	0	2
=	DF	(England)	3	Callum Kennedy	1	0	1	0	0	2
7	MF	(England)	8	Jake Reeves	1	0	0	0	0	1
7	MF	(England)	19	David Fitzpatrick	1	0	0	0	0	1
7	FW	(England)	35	Toyosi Olusanya	1	0	0	0	0	1
7	FW	(Republic of Ireland)	39	Rhys Murphy	1	0	0	0	0	1
7	N/A	N/A	N/A	Own goal	1	0	0	0	0	1
7	MF	(England)	16	Tom Beere	0	1	0	0	0	1
TOTALS					64	5	1	0	2	72*

=== Disciplinary record ===
Number	Position	Nation	Name	League Two		Play-offs		FA Cup		League Cup		JP Trophy		Total	
Number	Position	Nation	Name	Booked	Sent off (straight red)	Booked	Sent off (straight red)	Booked	Sent off (straight red)	Booked	Sent off (straight red)	Booked	Sent off (straight red)	Booked	Sent off (straight red)
2	DF	(England)	Barry Fuller	10	0	1	0	0	0	0	0	0	0	11	0
4	MF	(England)	Dannie Bulman	2	0	0	0	0	0	0	0	0	0	2	0
5	DF	(England)	Will Nightingale	1	0	0	0	0	0	0	0	0	0	1	0
6	DF	(England)	Paul Robinson	4	1	0	0	0	0	0	0	0	0	4	1
7	MF	(England)	George Francomb	2	0	0	0	0	0	0	0	0	0	2	0
8	MF	(England)	Jake Reeves	7	0	0	0	0	0	0	0	0	0	7	0
9	FW	(England)	Tom Elliott	4	0	0	0	0	0	0	0	0	0	4	0
10	FW	(England)	Adebayo Akinfenwa	1	0	2	0	0	0	0	0	0	0	3	0
11	FW	(England)	Sean Rigg	1	0	0	0	1	0	0	0	0	0	2	0
12	DF	(Wales)	Jonathan Meades	10	0	0	0	0	0	1	0	0	0	11	0
14	FW	(England)	Adebayo Azeez	3	0	0	0	0	0	0	0	0	0	3	0
16	MF	(England)	Tom Beere	1	0	0	0	0	0	0	0	0	0	1	0
17	MF	(England)	Andy Barcham	1	0	0	0	0	0	0	0	0	0	1	0
18	DF	(Nigeria)	Semi Ajayi	1	0	0	0	0	0	0	0	0	0	1	0
18	MF	(Republic of Ireland)	Connor Smith	2	0	0	0	0	0	0	0	0	0	2	0
20	DF	(Republic of Ireland)	Ryan Sweeney	2	1	0	0	0	0	0	0	0	0	2	1
22	DF	(England)	Karleigh Osborne	7	1	0	0	0	0	0	0	0	0	7	1
28	MF	(England)	Christian Toonga	0	0	0	0	1	0	0	0	0	0	0	1
32	DF	(England)	Darius Charles	0	0	2	0	0	0	0	0	0	0	2	0
33	FW	(Montserrat)	Lyle Taylor	5	1	1	0	0	0	0	0	0	0	6	1
			TOTALS	64	4	6	0	2	0	1	0	0	0	73	4

== Transfers ==
Players Transferred In
Date	Position	Nation	Name	Previous club	Fee	Ref.
12 June 2015	MF	(England)	Christian Toonga	Arsenal	Free	
23 June 2015	DF	(Wales)	Jonathan Meades	Oxford United	Free	
1 July 2015	MF	(England)	Andy Barcham	Portsmouth	Free	
2 July 2015	FW	(England)	Tom Elliott	Cambridge United	Free	
14 July 2015	FW	(Montserrat)	Lyle Taylor	Scunthorpe United	Undisclosed	
3 August 2015	DF	(England)	Paul Robinson	Portsmouth	Free	
22 January 2016	MF	(Republic of Ireland)	Connor Smith	Watford	Free	
Players Loaned In
Date from	Position	Nation	Name	From	Date to	Ref.
2 July 2015	DF	(England)	Karleigh Osborne	Bristol City	End of Season	
29 September 2015	DF	(Nigeria)	Semi Ajayi	Cardiff City	30 October 2015	
20 October 2015	GK	(England)	Ben Wilson	Cardiff City	14 December 2015	
1 February 2016	GK	(Netherlands)	Kelle Roos	Derby County	End of Season	
11 March 2016	FW	(Republic of Ireland)	Rhys Murphy	Oldham Athletic	End of Season	
17 March 2016	DF	(England)	Darius Charles	Burton Albion	End of Season	
Players Loaned Out
Date from	Position	Nation	Name	To	Date to	Ref.
30 October 2015	FW	(England)	George Oakley	Kingstonian	4 November 2015	
6 November 2015	MF	(England)	David Fitzpatrick	Tonbridge Angels	6 December 2015	
24 November 2015	MF	(England)	Tom Beere	Bishop's Stortford	24 December 2015	
6 February 2016	MF	(England)	Tom Beere	Hampton & Richmond Borough	24 April 2016	
10 February 2016	GK	(England)	Joe McDonnell	Hampton & Richmond Borough	28 February 2016	
29 February 2016	GK	(England)	Joe McDonnell	Harrow Borough	23 April 2016	
Players Transferred Out
Date	Position	Nation	Name	Subsequent club	Fee	Ref
12 May 2015	GK	(England)	Ross Worner	Sutton United	Released	
12 May 2015	DF	(England)	Jack Smith	Hemel Hempstead	Released	
12 May 2015	DF	(England)	Mark Phillips	Braintree Town	Released	
12 May 2015	MF	(England)	Sammy Moore	Leyton Orient	Released	
12 May 2015	MF	(England)	Alfie Potter	Northampton Town	Released	
12 May 2015	MF	(England)	Chace Jaquart	Portimonense S.C.	Released	
4 August 2015	FW	(England)	Dan Agyei	Burnley	Undisclosed Fee	
