= David Fitzpatrick (footballer, born 1995) =

English footballer

Personal information
- Date of birth: 10 February 1995 (age 31)
- Place of birth: London, England
- Height: 1.77 m (5 ft 9 1/2 in)
- Position: Midfielder

Team information
- Current team: Metropolitan Police

Youth career
- –2009: Fulham
- Staines Town
- –2013: Hampton & Richmond Borough
- 2013–2014: Queens Park Rangers

Senior career*
Years	Team	Apps	(Gls)
2014–2017	AFC Wimbledon	13	(1)
2015	→ Tonbridge Angels (loan)	7	(1)
2016–2017	→ Torquay United (loan)	13	(3)
2017–2018	Barrow	4	(0)
2018	Dorking Wanderers	0	(0)
2018–2019	Kingstonian	7	(1)
2019–2020	Walton Casuals	22	(2)
2020	Farnborough	5	(2)
2020–	Metropolitan Police	3	(0)
- * Club domestic league appearances and goals as of 09:58, 26 November 2020 (UTC)

David Aboro Fitzpatrick (born 10 February 1995) is an English footballer who plays as a midfielder for Metropolitan Police.

== Playing career ==
Fitzpatrick was brought up in Surbiton and attended Richard Challoner School in Malden Manor. He had been in the youth system at Fulham until 2009, before spells with Staines Town and Hampton & Richmond Borough. Having come through the ranks at QPR, Fitzpatrick was signed by AFC Wimbledon on 23 September 2014 by Alan Reeves as part of the club's newly formed under-21 side, after impressing as a trialist. He first appeared as an unused substitute in the 2–0 away loss to Wycombe Wanderers on 18 October 2014. He made his football league debut on 28 December 2014, coming on as a 76th-minute substitute against Exeter City which ended in a 4–1 victory for the "Dons". He scored his first goal for Wimbledon in January 2016. Fitzpatrick signed for Barrow on 28 June 2017 on a 1-year deal.

After leaving Barrow, he had spells at Dorking Wanderers, Kingstonian and Walton Casuals before signing for Southern League side Farnborough in February 2020.

After beginning the 2020–21 campaign with Farnborough, Fitzpatrick made the move to Metropolitan Police in October.

== Career statistics ==
As of match played 3 November 2020.

Club	Season	League			FA Cup		League Cup		Other		Total	
Club	Season	Division	Apps	Goals	Apps	Goals	Apps	Goals	Apps	Goals	Apps	Goals
AFC Wimbledon	2014–15	League Two	3	0	0	0	0	0	0	0	3	0
AFC Wimbledon	2015–16	League Two	4	1	0	0	0	0	1 (Note: Appearance(s) in Football League Trophy)	0	5	1
AFC Wimbledon	2016–17	League One	6	0	0	0	0	0	2 (Note: Appearance(s) in EFL Trophy)	0	8	0
AFC Wimbledon	Total		13	1	0	0	0	0	3	0	16	1
Tonbridge Angels (loan)	2015–16	Isthmian League Premier Division	7	1	—		—		1 (Note: Appearance(s) in FA Trophy)	0	8	1
Torquay United (loan)	2016–17	National League	13	3	—		—		1	0	14	3
Barrow	2017–18	National League	4	0	0	0	—		1	0	5	0
Dorking Wanderers	2018–19	Isthmian League Premier Division	0	0	0	0	—		1 (Note: Appearance(s) in Alan Turvey Trophy)	0	1	0
Kingstonian	2018–19	Isthmian League Premier Division	7	1	—		—		2	0	9	1
Walton Casuals	2019–20	Southern League Premier Division South	22	2	1	0	—		1	0	24	2
Farnborough	2019–20	Southern League Premier Division South	4	2	—		—		—		4	2
Farnborough	2020–21	Southern League Premier Division South	1	0	2	0	—		0	0	3	0
Farnborough	Total		5	2	2	0	—		0	0	7	2
Metropolitan Police	2020–21	Southern League Premier Division South	3	0	—		—		1	0	4	0
Career total			74	10	3	0	0	0	11	0	88	10
