= 2016–17 AFC Wimbledon season =

AFC Wimbledon
2016–17 season
- Chairman: Erik Samuelson
- Manager: Neal Ardley
- Stadium: Kingsmeadow
- League One: 15th
- FA Cup: Third round vs Sutton United (17 January 2017)
- League Cup: First round vs Peterborough United (9 August 2016)
- League Trophy: Second round vs Brighton & Hove Albion (6 December 2016)
- Top goalscorer: League: Tom Elliott 9 All: Tom Elliott 13
- Highest home attendance: 4,826 vs Bradford City (29 October 2016)
- Lowest home attendance: 4,023 vs Fleetwood Town (26 November 2016)
- Average home league attendance: 4,486
Home colours	Away colours	Third colours

The 2016–17 season was AFC Wimbledon's 15th season in the club's history and The Dons' 1st season in League One following their promotion via the 2016 Football League play-offs.

== League table ==
Pos	Team	Pld	W	D	L	GF	GA	GD	Pts
13	Charlton Athletic	46	14	18	14	60	53	+7	60
14	Walsall	46	14	16	16	51	58	−7	58
15	AFC Wimbledon	46	13	18	15	52	55	−3	57
16	Northampton Town	46	14	11	21	60	73	−13	53
17	Oldham Athletic	46	12	17	17	31	44	−13	53

Source: BBC Sport
Rules for classification: 1) Points; 2) Goal difference; 3) Number of goals scored

=== Results summary ===
Round	1	2	3	4	5	6	7	8	9	10	11	12	13	14	15	16	17	18	19	20	21	22	23	24	25	26	27	28	29	30	31	32	33	34	35	36	37	38	39	40	41	42	43	44	45	46
Ground	A	H	H	A	A	H	H	A	H	A	H	A	H	A	A	H	A	H	A	H	A	H	A	A	H	H	A	A	H	H	A	A	H	A	A	H	H	A	H	H	A	H	A	H	A	H
Result	L	L	L	D	D	W	L	W	D	D	W	W	D	W	W	L	D	W	D	D	L	W	L	L	D	W	D	L	D	D	L	D	W	W	D	L	W	D	L	W	L	L	D	D	L	D
Position	20	23	24	23	24	19	21	17	20	20	15	10	12	9	6	9	9	6	7	7	10	9	11	11	13	12	11	14	15	15	15	14	13	12	13	13	12	13	13	12	12	13	13	14	15	15

Updated to match(es) played on 22 April 2017. Source: BBC Sport
A = Away; H = Home; W = Win; D = Draw; L = Loss

Overall								Home						Away					
Pld	W	D	L	GF	GA	GD	Pts	W	D	L	GF	GA	GD	W	D	L	GF	GA	GD
46	13	18	15	52	55	−3	57	8	8	7	34	25	+9	5	10	8	18	30	−12

Last updated: 22 April 2017.
Source: BBC Sport

== Matches ==
=== Pre-season friendlies ===
12 July 2016 Friendly	Dover Athletic	4–3	AFC Wimbledon	Crabble Athletic Ground
19:45 BST	Jackson 48'; Marsh 54'; Chiedozie 59'; Doninger 75'	Report	Elliott 29' (pen.); Taylor 49'; Poleon 85' (pen.)	Attendance: 398

16 July 2016 Friendly	Margate	1–1	AFC Wimbledon	Hartsdown Park
15:00 BST	Buchanan 12'	Report	Taylor 24'	Attendance: 711

23 July 2016 Friendly	AFC Wimbledon	2–0	Reading	Kingsmeadow
15:00 BST	Parrett 1'; Poleon 20'	Report		Attendance: 1,336

27 July 2016 Friendly	AFC Wimbledon	2–3	Crystal Palace	Kingsmeadow
19:00 BST	Taylor 38'; Souaré 77' (o.g.)	Report	Wickham 29'; Bolasie 67'; Ladapo 76'	Attendance: 2,391

29 July 2016 Friendly	Woking	1–2	AFC Wimbledon	Kingfield Stadium
19:45 BST	Penny 40'	Report	Elliott 4', 49'	Attendance: 641

30 July 2016 Friendly	Dagenham & Redbridge	0–1	AFC Wimbledon	Victoria Road
15:00 BST		Report	Fitzpatrick 25'	Attendance: 508

=== League One ===
==== August ====
6 August 2016 1	Walsall	3–1	AFC Wimbledon	Bescot Stadium
15:00 BST	Oztumer 7'; Jackson 38', 72'; Moussa (yellow card) 80'; Henry (yellow card) 90'	Report	Robinson (yellow card) 37'; Taylor 90' (pen.); Parrett (yellow card) 90+2'	Attendance: 5,845; Referee: Charles Breakspear

13 August 2016 2	AFC Wimbledon	1–2	Bolton Wanderers	Kingsmeadow
15:00 BST	Barcham 16'; Fuller (yellow card) 85'	Report	Madine 34'; Davies (yellow card) 54'; Trotter 70'; Clough (yellow card) 84'	Attendance: 4,619; Referee: Gavin Ward

16 August 2016 3	AFC Wimbledon	1–2	Scunthorpe United	Kingsmeadow
19:45 BST	Barnett (yellow card) 39'; Charles 61'	Report	Hopper 23'; Morris 41' (pen.) van Veen (yellow card) 54'	Attendance: 4,163; Referee: Dean Whitestone

20 August 2016 4	Northampton Town	0–0	AFC Wimbledon	Sixfields Stadium
15:00 BST	Buchanan (yellow card) 74'; O'Toole (yellow card) 90+4'	Report		Attendance: 5,185; Referee: Nick Kinseley

27 August 2016 5	Rochdale	1–1	AFC Wimbledon	Spotland Stadium
15:00 BST	Camps (yellow card) 81' (yellow-red card) 82'; Mendez-Laing (yellow card) 90+3'; Allen 90+5'	Report	Robinson (yellow card) 9'; Barcham 12'; Meades (yellow card) 30'; Francomb (yellow card) 85'; Reeves (yellow card) 90+3'	Attendance: 2,274; Referee: Chris Sarginson

==== September ====
3 September 2016 6	AFC Wimbledon	2–1	Chesterfield	Kingsmeadow
15:00 BST	Robinson 53'; Elliott (yellow card) 78'; Poleon 90+1'	Report	Charles 35' (o.g.); Evans (yellow card) 90+5'	Attendance: 4,425; Referee: Kevin Johnson

10 September 2016 7	AFC Wimbledon	2–3	Sheffield United	Kingsmeadow
15:00 BST	Poleon 37'; Fuller (yellow card) 40'; Elliott 72'	Report	Duffy 20'; Sharp (yellow card) 16' (goal) 26'; Done 60'	Attendance: 4,810; Referee: Graham Salisbury

17 September 2016 8	Charlton Athletic	1–2	AFC Wimbledon	The Valley
15:00 BST	Lookman 8'	Report	Poleon 78'; Barnett 85'; Bulman (yellow card) 90+1'	Attendance: 11,927; Referee: Oliver Langford

24 September 2016 9	AFC Wimbledon	1–1	Shrewsbury Town	Kingsmeadow
15:00 BST	Taylor 6'; Poleon (yellow card) 45+3'	Report	Toney (yellow card) 28' (yellow-red card) 82'; Black 46' (yellow card) 63'; Lancashire (yellow card) 90+1'	Attendance: 4,318; Referee: Michael Salisbury

28 September 2016 10	Coventry City	2–2	AFC Wimbledon	Ricoh Arena
19:45 BST	Sordell 2' (yellow card) 90+8'; Willis (yellow card) 72'; McCann (yellow card) 81'; Wright 90+4'	Report	Meades 37'; Robinson (yellow card) 55'; Taylor 83'	Attendance: 8,030; Referee: Mark Heywood

==== October ====
1 October 2016 11	AFC Wimbledon	2–0	Gillingham	Kingsmeadow
15:00 BST	Poleon 20'; Parrett 45+1' (pen.) (yellow card) 61'	Report	Osadebe (yellow card) 27'; Konchesky (yellow card) 72'; Donnelly (red card) 89'	Attendance: 4,653; Referee: Darren England

9 October 2016 12	Oxford United	1–3	AFC Wimbledon	Kassam Stadium
12:15 BST	Charles 49' (o.g.); Dunkley (yellow card) 70'; Johnson (yellow card) 81'	Report	Elliott (yellow card) 10' (goal) 20'; Taylor (yellow card) 13'; Charles 42'; Barcham 45+2'; Shea (yellow card) 59'	Attendance: 7,742; Referee: Darren Deadman

15 October 2016 13	AFC Wimbledon	0–0	Swindon Town	Kingsmeadow
15:00 BST	Robinson (yellow card) 30'; Parrett (yellow card) 62'; Bulman (yellow card) 68'; Charles (yellow card) 90+1'	Report	Kasim (yellow card) 32'; Thomas (yellow card) 69'; Thompson (yellow card) 79'; Vigouroux (yellow card) 89'	Attendance: 4,800; Referee: John Busby

18 October 2016 14	Bury	1–2	AFC Wimbledon	Gigg Lane
19:45 BST	Danns 27' (pen.); Tutte (yellow card) 68'	Report	Robinson (yellow card) 26'; Taylor 39'; Meades 90+1'	Attendance: 2,211; Referee: Andy Haines

22 October 2016 15	Peterborough United	0–1	AFC Wimbledon	London Road Stadium
15:00 BST	Edwards (yellow card) 71'; Taylor (yellow card) 79'	Report	Elliott 10'; Fuller (yellow card) 84'	Attendance: 6,642; Referee: Brett Huxtable

29 October 2016 16	AFC Wimbledon	2–3	Bradford City	Kingsmeadow
15:00 BST	Elliott 18'; Taylor 68' (pen.); Reeves (yellow card) 73'; Barnett (yellow card) 90+1'	Report	Hiwula 3'; Hanson 78' (pen.), 90+2'	Attendance: 4,826; Referee: Graham Horwood

==== November ====
12 November 2016 17	Oldham Athletic	0–0	AFC Wimbledon	Boundary Park
15:00 GMT		Report	Reeves (yellow card) 83'	Attendance: 3,856; Referee: Darren Deadman

19 November 2016 18	AFC Wimbledon	5–1	Bury	Kingsmeadow
15:00 GMT	Parrett (yellow card) 15'; Whelpdale 26'; Poleon 27'; Elliott 28'; Francomb 36' (pen.), 57'		Maher (yellow card) 25'; Vaughan 40'; Barnett (yellow card) 79'	Attendance: 4,141; Referee: Dean Whitestone

22 November 2016 19	Millwall	0–0	AFC Wimbledon	The Den
19:45 GMT	Thompson (yellow card) 33'; Martin (yellow card) 71'; Craig (yellow card) 82'	Report	Meades (yellow card) 51' (yellow-red card) 74'; Fuller (yellow card) 88'	Attendance: 8,614; Referee: Graham Horwood

26 November 2016 20	AFC Wimbledon	2–2	Fleetwood Town	Kingsmeadow
15:00 GMT	Poleon (yellow card) 31' (goal) 47'; Parrett 75' (pen.)	Report	Bolger 12'; Davis (yellow card) 75'; McLaughlin 90+2'	Attendance: 4,023; Referee: Lee Swabey

==== December ====
10 December 2016 21	Milton Keynes Dons	1–0	AFC Wimbledon	Stadium mk
13:00 GMT	Bowditch 63' (pen.)	Report	Whelpdale (yellow card) 60'; Robinson (yellow card) 67'	Attendance: 11,185; Referee: Geoff Eltringham

17 December 2016 22	AFC Wimbledon	4–0	Port Vale	Kingsmeadow
15:00 GMT	Francomb (yellow card) 16'; Poleon 53'; Elliott 58'; Parrett (yellow card) 66'; Barnett 85'; Robertson 89'	Report	Amoros (yellow card) 18'; Streete (yellow card) 60' de Freitas (yellow card) 81'; Kelly (yellow card) 82'	Attendance: 4,291; Referee: Brendan Malone

26 December 2016 23	Southend United	3–0	AFC Wimbledon	Roots Hall Stadium
13:00 GMT	Cox 10', 84'; Atkinson 41'; Ferdinand (yellow card) 55'; Fortuné (yellow card) 85'; Leonard (yellow card) 90+1'	Report	Taylor (yellow card) 49' (yellow-red card) 72'	Attendance: 8,493; Referee: Lee Collins

31 December 2016 24	Bristol Rovers	2–0	AFC Wimbledon	Memorial Stadium
15:00 GMT	Montaño (yellow card) 42'; Taylor 61', 70'; Clarke (yellow card) 86'	Report	Reeves (yellow card) 23'; Bulman (yellow card) 51'	Attendance: 10,093; Referee: Brett Huxtable

==== January ====
2 January 2017 25	AFC Wimbledon	2–2	Millwall	Kingsmeadow
13:00 GMT	Taylor 12'; Elliott 51'	Report	O'Brien 5'; Morison 40' (yellow card) 74'	Attendance: 4,742; Referee: Nigel Miller

14 January 2017 26	AFC Wimbledon	2–1	Oxford United	Kingsmeadow
15:00 GMT	Parrett 12'; Kelly 28' (yellow card) 90+4'; Robinson (yellow card) 43'; Poleon (yellow card) 90+1'	Report	Hall 6'; Taylor (yellow card) 25'; Nelson (yellow card) 46'; Johnson (yellow card) 74'	Attendance: 4,808; Referee: Mark Haywood

21 January 2017 27	Chesterfield	0–0	AFC Wimbledon	Proact Stadium
15:00 GMT	Nolan (yellow card) 29'; Hird (yellow card) 77'	Report	Charles (yellow card) 66'; Francomb (yellow card) 90+2'	Attendance: 6,379; Referee: Eddie Ilderton

==== February ====
4 February 2017 28	Sheffield United	4–0	AFC Wimbledon	Bramall Lane
15:00 GMT	Sharp 2'; Hanson 37'; Fleck 79'; Lavery 90+1'	Report		Attendance: 20,549; Referee: David Webb

11 February 2017 29	AFC Wimbledon	1–1	Charlton Athletic	Kingsmeadow
15:00 GMT	Robertson (yellow card) 8'; Reeves (yellow card) 26'; Elliott (yellow card) 66' (yellow-red card) 90+3' (goal) 90+2'; Taylor (yellow card) 87'	Report	Holmes 8' (yellow card) 37'; Ngoyo (yellow card) 11'; Chicksen (yellow card) 48'	Attendance: 4,595; Referee: Carl Boyeson

14 February 2017 30	AFC Wimbledon	1–1	Coventry City	Kingsmeadow
19:45 GMT	Robinson 90+3'	Report	Jones 71'	Attendance: 4,022; Referee: Gavin Ward

18 February 2017 31	Shrewsbury Town	2–1	AFC Wimbledon	Greenhous Meadow
15:00 GMT	Roberts 65'; Nsiala 90'	Report	Kelly (yellow card) 57'; Barcham 68'; Elliott (yellow card) 90+2'	Attendance: 5,751; Referee: Kevin Johnson

21 February 2017 32	Gillingham	2–2	AFC Wimbledon	Priestfield Stadium
19:45 GMT	Dack 19'; Wright 36'	Report	Taylor 17'; Shea (yellow card) 37'; Barcham 69'	Attendance: 4,956; Referee: Darren Deadman

25 February 2017 33	AFC Wimbledon	1–0	Walsall	Kingsmeadow
15:00 GMT	Reeves (yellow card) 64'; Taylor 68'	Report	Osbourne (yellow card) 76'	Attendance: 4,586; Referee: John Busby

28 February 2017 34	Scunthorpe United	1–2	AFC Wimbledon	Glanford Park
19:45 GMT	Mirfin (yellow card) 7'; Morris 74'	Report	Barcham (yellow card) 37'; Taylor (yellow card) 57'; Parrett 60' (yellow card) 73'; Poleon 69'; Soares (yellow card) 85'	Attendance: 3,368; Referee: Seb Stockbridge

==== March ====
4 March 2017 35	Bolton Wanderers	1–1	AFC Wimbledon	Macron Stadium
15:00 GMT	Madine 15'	Report	Elliott 39'; Soares (yellow card) 66'	Attendance: 13,599; Referee: Dean Whitestone

11 March 2017 36	AFC Wimbledon	0–1	Northampton Town	Kingsmeadow
15:00 GMT	Francomb (yellow card) 58'	Report	Phillips (yellow card) 37'; Taylor 86' (pen.)	Attendance: 4,512; Referee: Nigel Miller

14 March 2017 37	AFC Wimbledon	2–0	Milton Keynes Dons	Kingsmeadow
19:45 GMT	Reeves 62' (yellow card) 73'; Taylor 68'	Report	Upson (yellow card) 79'; Williams (yellow card) 87'; O'Keefe (yellow card) 90+1'	Attendance: 4,112; Referee: Roger East

18 March 2017 38	Fleetwood Town	0–0	AFC Wimbledon	Highbury Stadium
15:00 GMT	Schwabl (yellow card) 90+4'	Report	Nightingale (yellow card) 27'	Attendance: 3,422; Referee: Mark Brown

25 March 2017 39	AFC Wimbledon	0–2	Southend United	Kingsmeadow
15:00 GMT	Taylor (yellow card) 70'	Report	Ranger 35'; Cox 64'	Attendance: 4,803; Referee: Nick Kinseley

28 March 2017 40	AFC Wimbledon	3–1	Rochdale	Kingsmeadow
19:45 GMT	Kelly 53'; Taylor 55'; Parrett 58' (pen.)	Report	McNulty (yellow card) 25'; Lund (yellow card) 44'; Keane (red card) 45+1'; Henderson (yellow card) 45+3'; Camps 65'	Attendance: 3,812; Referee: Brett Huxtable

==== April ====
1 April 2017 41	Port Vale	2–0	AFC Wimbledon	Vale Park
15:00 GMT	Smith 22'; Eagles (yellow card) 48' (goal) 69'	Report	Barcham (yellow card) 17'; Robinson (yellow card) 58'	Attendance: 4,308; Referee: Darren Drysdale

8 April 2017 42	AFC Wimbledon	0–1	Bristol Rovers	Kingsmeadow
15:00 GMT	Taylor (yellow card) 44'	Report	Bodin 1'; Sweeney (yellow card) 90+2'	Attendance: 4,742; Referee: Robert Jones

14 April 2017 43	Swindon Town	0–0	AFC Wimbledon	County Ground
15:00 GMT		Report	Soares (yellow card) 24'; Francomb (yellow card) 41'; Robinson (yellow card) 50'	Attendance: 7,716; Referee: Michael Salisbury

17 April 2017 44	AFC Wimbledon	0–0	Peterborough United	Kingsmeadow
15:00 GMT		Report		Attendance: 4,294; Referee: Darren Handley

22 April 2017 45	Bradford City	3–0	AFC Wimbledon	Valley Parade
15:00 GMT	McMahon 29' (pen.), 85'; Vincelot (yellow card) 43'; Marshall 45+3'	Report	Francomb (yellow card) 58'	Attendance: 18,615; Referee: John Busby

30 April 2017 46	AFC Wimbledon	0–0	Oldham Athletic	Kingsmeadow
12:00 GMT		Report	Ngoo (yellow card) 45+3'	Attendance: 4,867; Referee: Nick Kinseley

=== FA Cup ===
On 17 October 2016, the draw for the FA Cup First round proper took place. The competition progresses in knock-out stages, culminating in a Final to be played at Wembley Stadium on 27 May 2017.

==== First round ====
At this stage, there were 80 clubs remaining in the competition (32 non-league teams progressing from the qualifying rounds and the 48 clubs from League One and League Two). AFC Wimbledon were drawn against fellow League One side Bury.

5 November 2016 First round	Bury	2–2	AFC Wimbledon	Gigg Lane
15:00 GMT	Hope 27', 29'; Danns (yellow card) 64'; Mellis (yellow card) 90+2'	Report	Taylor 61' (yellow card) 79'; Elliott 67'; Parrett (yellow card) 73'; Robinson (yellow card) 83'	Attendance: 2,346; Referee: Jeremy Simpson

15 November 2016 First round replay	AFC Wimbledon	5–0	Bury	Kingsmeadow
19:45 GMT	Robinson 27'; Parrett 32'; Robertson (yellow card) 34'; Poleon 45+2' (yellow card) 63' (goal) 72'; Taylor 80'	Report	Barnett (yellow card) 26'; Tutte (yellow card) 50'; Vaughan (yellow card) 52'	Attendance: 2,316; Referee: John Brooks

==== Second round ====
On 7 November 2016, the draw for the FA Cup Second round took place. At this stage, there were 40 clubs remaining in the competition (17 League One sides, 11 League Two sides and 12 non-league sides). AFC Wimbledon were drawn against National League North side Curzon Ashton.

4 December 2016 Second round	Curzon Ashton	3–4	AFC Wimbledon	Tameside Stadium
12:00 GMT	Morgan 1', 21', 62' (yellow card) 64'; Rowney (yellow card) 90+4'	Report	Elliott 80', 90+4' (yellow card) 90+5'; Poleon 81'; Barnett 82'	Attendance: 1,731; Referee: James Adcock

==== Third round ====
On 5 December 2016, the draw for the FA Cup Third round took place. At this stage, there were 64 clubs remaining in the competition (20 Premier League sides, 24 Championship sides, 9 League One sides, 6 League Two sides and 5 non-league sides). AFC Wimbledon were drawn away against local National League side Sutton United.

7 January 2017 Third round	Sutton United	0–0	AFC Wimbledon	Gander Green Lane
15:00 GMT	Downer (yellow card) 25'; Biamou (yellow card) 47'; Collins (yellow card) 60'; Bailey (yellow card) 75'	Report	Reeves (yellow card) 22'; Robinson (yellow card) 61'	Attendance: 5,200; Referee: Keith Stroud

17 January 2017 Third round replay	AFC Wimbledon	1–3	Sutton United	Kingsmeadow
19:45 GMT	Elliott 10'; Robinson (red card) 15'; Kelly (yellow card) 57'; Barnett (yellow card) 85'	Report	Deacon (yellow card) 34' (goal) 75'; Spence (yellow card) 43'; Collins (yellow card) 82'; Biamou 90'; Fitchett 90+6'	Attendance: 4,768; Referee: Darren Drysdale

=== Football League Cup ===
On 22 June 2016, the draw for the Football League Cup took place. The draw is seeded and regionalised on a north/south basis. Seedings are based on the league finishing positions for clubs in the previous season. The competition progresses in knock-out stages, culminating in a Final to be played at Wembley Stadium on 26 February 2017.

==== First round ====
The First Round of the competition includes 70 of the 72 Football League clubs: 24 from League Two, 24 from League One, and 22 from the Championship.

9 August 2016 First round	Peterborough United	3–2	AFC Wimbledon	London Road Stadium
19:45 BST	Forrester (yellow card) 23'; Da Silva Lopes (yellow card) 37'; Nichols 64' 90+3'; Taylor 68'	BBC Report	Whelpdale 34'; Reeves (yellow card) 67'; Fuller (yellow card) 67'; Taylor 78'	Attendance: 2,850; Referee: Ollie Yates

=== Football League Trophy ===
On 27 June 2016, the draw was made for the Group stages of the newly structured Football League Trophy. The first round will now consist of 64 clubs (24 from League One, 24 from League Two and 16 Category 1 Academy Teams) split into 16 groups of 4 teams, regionalised on a north/south basis, with each group including one Academy Team. Each club will play each other once, either home or away, with the top 2 teams from each group progressing to the knock-out stages, culminating in a Final to be played at Wembley Stadium on 2 April 2017.

==== First Round (Southern Group B) ====
Pos	Div	Team	Pld	W	PW	PL	L	GF	GA	GD	Pts	Qualification
1	L1	AFC Wimbledon	3	2	0	0	1	5	3	+2	6	Advance to Round 2
2	ACA	Swansea City U21	3	2	0	0	1	4	4	0	6	Advance to Round 2
3	L2	Plymouth Argyle	3	1	0	0	2	5	5	0	3	
4	L2	Newport County	3	1	0	0	2	4	6	−2	3	

Source: Sky Sports

30 August 2016 Southern Group B	AFC Wimbledon	3–0	Swansea City U23	Kingsmeadow
19:45 BST	Barcham 38'; Reeves (yellow card) 46'; Poleon 57', 67'	Report	Fulton (yellow card) 44'	Attendance: 461; Referee: Simon Hooper

4 October 2016 Southern Group B	AFC Wimbledon	2–1	Plymouth Argyle	Kingsmeadow
19:45 BST	Taylor (yellow card) 28' (goal) 65'; Barnett 68' (yellow card) 89'; Beere (yellow card) 71'	Report	Smith 7'; Miller (yellow card) 64'	Attendance: 936; Referee: Graham Horwood

8 November 2016 Southern Group B	Newport County	2–0	AFC Wimbledon	Rodney Parade
19:30 UTC	Bennett 7'; Labadie (yellow card) 15'; Owen-Evans (yellow card) 77'; Barnum-Bobb 85'	Report	Owens (yellow card) 15'; Nightingale (yellow card) 87'	Attendance: 368; Referee: Andrew Davies

==== Second Round (Southern Section) ====
The draw for the Second Round took place on 10 November 2016, with 32 clubs (13 from League One, 11 from League Two and 8 Category 1 Academy sides) progressing from the previous round, continuing to be regionalised on a north/south basis, with each group winner from the previous round being drawn at home to a second placed team from a different qualifying group.

6 December 2016 Southern Section	AFC Wimbledon	1–2	Brighton & Hove Albion U23	Kingsmeadow
19:45 GMT	Barnett 68'	Report	Manu 38'; Towell 45+2' (pen.); LuaLua (red card) 88'	Attendance: 497; Referee: Charles Breakspear

== Squad ==
As of 30 April 2017

No.	Name	Pos.	Nat.	Place of Birth	Age	L. Apps	L. Goals	Int. Caps	Int. Goals	Signed from	Date signed	Fee	Ends
Goalkeepers
1	James Shea	GK	(England)	Islington	35	95	0	0	0	Harrow Borough	4 July 2014	Free	1 July 2017
24	Joe McDonnell	GK	(England)	Basingstoke	32	7	0	0	0	Basingstoke Town	5 July 2014	Undisclosed	1 July 2017
39	Joe Bursík	GK	(England)	Lambeth	26	0	0	0	0	Academy	13 January 2017	Trainee	Undisclosed
40	Nik Tzanev	GK	(New Zealand)	Wellington	29	0	0	0	0	Brentford	?	Free	Undisclosed
Defenders
2	Barry Fuller	RB	(England)	Ashford	42	163	1	0	0	Barnet	28 May 2013	Free	1 July 2018
3	Jonathan Meades	LB	(Wales)	Gloucester	34	91	6	0	0	Oxford United	22 June 2015	Free	1 July 2018
5	Will Nightingale	CB	(England)	Roehampton	31	20	0	0	0	Academy	6 May 2014	Trainee	1 July 2019
6	Paul Robinson	CB	(England)	Barnet	44	87	5	0	0	Portsmouth	3 August 2015	Free	1 July 2019
22	Sean Kelly	CB/LB	(Scotland)	Glasgow	33	26	2	0	0	St Mirren	1 August 2016	Free	1 July 2018
29	Paul Kalambayi	CB	(England)	Dulwich	27	0	0	0	0	Academy	18 February 2016	Trainee	1 July 2018
31	Seth Owens	LB/CB	(England)	Hackney	28	3	0	0	0	Brentford	16 August 2016	Free	1 July 2018
32	Darius Charles	CB	(England)	Ealing	38	43	2	0	0	Burton Albion	31 May 2016	Free	1 July 2018
34	Chris Robertson	CB/RB	(Scotland)	Dundee	40	13	1	0	0	Ross County	2 September 2016	Free	1 July 2018
35	Toby Sibbick	CB/RB	(England)	Hounslow	27	2	0	0	0	Academy	26 August 2016	Trainee	1 July 2018
?	Johnville Renee-Pringle	RB	(England)	Camden	29	0	0	0	0	Stoke City	20 January 2017	Trainee	1 July 2019
Midfielders
4	Dannie Bulman	CM	(England)	Ashford	47	121	4	0	0	Crawley Town	10 June 2014	Free	1 July 2017
7	George Francomb	RW/RB	(England)	Hackney	35	159	11	0	0	Norwich City	26 June 2013	Free	1 July 2018
8	Jake Reeves	CM	(England)	Lewisham	33	114	4	0	0	Swindon Town	7 January 2015	Undisclosed	1 July 2018
11	Chris Whelpdale	RW/LW	(England)	Harold Wood	39	17	1	0	0	Stevenage	28 June 2016	Free	1 July 2018
14	Tom Soares	CM	(England)	Reading	40	15	0	0	0	Bury	31 January 2017	Undisclosed	1 July 2019
16	Tom Beere	CM/RM	(England)	Southwark	31	29	1	0	0	Academy	6 May 2014	Trainee	1 July 2017
17	Andy Barcham	LW	(England)	Basildon	39	70	10	0	0	Portsmouth	1 July 2015	Free	1 July 2019
18	Dean Parrett	CM	(England)	Hampstead	34	32	5	0	0	Stevenage	1 July 2016	Free	1 July 2018
19	David Fitzpatrick	RW/LW	(England)	Surbiton	31	14	1	0	0	Queens Park Rangers	23 September 2014	Free	1 July 2017
25	Dan Gallagher	CM	(England)	Epsom	29	1	0	0	0	Academy	6 February 2015	Trainee	1 July 2017
27	Neşet Bellikli	LW	(Turkey)	Sutton	28	0	0	0	0	Academy	16 May 2016	Trainee	1 July 2018
28	Alfie Egan	AM	(England)	Lambeth	29	9	0	0	0	Academy	5 February 2016	Trainee	1 July 2018
?	Anthony Hartigan	CM	(England)	Kingston upon Thames	26	0	0	0	0	Academy	27 January 2017	Trainee	1 July 2019
Forwards
9	Tom Elliott	CF	(England)	Leeds	35	78	15	0	0	Cambridge United	2 July 2015	Free	1 July 2017
10	Dominic Poleon	CF	(England)	Newham	33	41	8	0	0	Oldham Athletic	2 July 2016	Free	1 July 2018
15	George Oakley	CF	(England)	Tooting	30	9	0	0	0	Academy	6 May 2014	Trainee	1 July 2017
21	Egli Kaja	CF	(Albania)		29	3	0	0	0	Academy	17 April 2015	Trainee	1 July 2017
23	Tyrone Barnett	CF	(England)	Stevenage	41	36	2	0	0	Shrewsbury Town	3 August 2016	Free	1 July 2018
29	Toyosi Olusanya	CF	(England)	Lambeth	28	1	1	0	0	Academy	5 February 2016	Trainee	1 July 2018
33	Lyle Taylor	CF	(Montserrat)	Greenwich	36	85	30	2	1	Scunthorpe United	14 July 2015	Undisclosed	1 July 2018
38	Jayden Antwi	CF	(England)	?		1	0	0	0	Academy	28 March 2017	Trainee	1 July 2019

== Player statistics ==
As of 30 April 2017

No.	Pos	Nat	Player	Total		League One		FA Cup		League Cup		League Trophy	
No.	Pos	Nat	Player	Apps	Goals	Apps	Goals	Apps	Goals	Apps	Goals	Apps	Goals
1	GK	(England) ENG	James Shea	43	0	36	0	5	0	0	0	2	0
2	DF	(England) ENG	Barry Fuller (Captain)	35	0	28	0	5	0	1	0	1	0
3	DF	(Wales) WAL	Jonathan Meades	26	2	22+2	2	2	0	0	0	0	0
4	MF	(England) ENG	Dannie Bulman	43	0	31+6	0	4	0	0	0	0+2	0
5	DF	(England) ENG	Will Nightingale	16	0	10+2	0	0	0	0	0	4	0
6	DF	(England) ENG	Paul Robinson	49	3	43	2	5	1	1	0	0	0
7	MF	(England) ENG	George Francomb	42	2	31+3	2	3+1	0	0	0	4	0
8	MF	(England) ENG	Jake Reeves	54	1	46	1	4	0	1	0	2+1	0
9	FW	(England) ENG	Tom Elliott	46	13	30+9	9	3+1	4	0+1	0	0+2	0
10	FW	(England) ENG	Dominic Poleon	49	12	19+22	7	2+1	3	1	0	4	2
11	MF	(England) ENG	Chris Whelpdale	23	2	8+9	1	1+2	0	1	1	2	0
14	MF	(England) ENG	Tom Soares	15	0	15	0	0	0	0	0	0	0
15	FW	(England) ENG	George Oakley	3	0	0+2	0	0	0	0	0	0+1	0
16	MF	(England) ENG	Tom Beere	15	0	3+5	0	1+1	0	0+1	0	4	0
17	MF	(England) ENG	Andy Barcham	41	6	31+5	5	3	0	1	0	1	1
18	MF	(England) ENG	Dean Parrett	42	6	20+12	5	4+1	1	1	0	4	0
19	MF	(England) ENG	David Fitzpatrick	7	0	2+3	0	0	0	0	0	0+2	0
21	FW	(Albania) ALB	Egli Kaja	1	0	0+1	0	0	0	0	0	0	0
22	DF	(Scotland) SCO	Sean Kelly	32	2	22+4	2	2	0	1	0	3	0
23	FW	(England) ENG	Tyrone Barnett	44	5	11+25	2	1+2	1	1	0	4	2
24	GK	(England) ENG	Joe McDonnell	5	0	3	0	0	0	0	0	1+1	0
25	MF	(England) ENG	Dan Gallagher	0	0	0	0	0	0	0	0	0	0
27	MF	(Turkey) TUR	Neşet Bellikli	0	0	0	0	0	0	0	0	0	0
28	MF	(England) ENG	Alfie Egan	12	0	3+6	0	0	0	0	0	2+1	0
29	DF	(England) ENG	Paul Kalambayi	0	0	0	0	0	0	0	0	0	0
30	FW	(England) ENG	Toyosi Olusanya	0	0	0	0	0	0	0	0	0	0
31	DF	(England) ENG	Seth Owens	6	0	2+1	0	0+1	0	0	0	2	0
32	DF	(England) ENG	Darius Charles	36	3	32+2	2	2	0	0	1	0	0
33	FW	(Montserrat) MSR	Lyle Taylor	50	14	36+7	10	5	2	0+1	1	1	1
34	DF	(Scotland) SCO	Chris Robertson	19	1	13	1	3+1	0	0	0	2	0
35	DF	(England) ENG	Toby Sibbick	2	0	1+1	0	0	0	0	0	0	0
38	FW	(England) ENG	Jayden Antwi	1	0	0+1	0	0	0	0	0	0	0
39	GK	(England) ENG	Joe Bursík	0	0	0	0	0	0	0	0	0	0
40	GK	(New Zealand) NZL	Nik Tzanev	0	0	0	0	0	0	0	0	0	0
-	DF	(England) ENG	Johnville Renee-Pringle	0	0	0	0	0	0	0	0	0	0
-	MF	(England) ENG	Anthony Hartigan	0	0	0	0	0	0	0	0	0	0
Players who featured on loan for AFC Wimbledon but subsequently returned to their parent club:
Players who left or were released by AFC Wimbledon during the course of the season:
26	GK	(England) ENG	Ryan Clarke	9	0	7	0	0	0	1	0	1	0

=== Top scorers ===
Rank	Position	Nation	Number	Player	League One	FA Cup	League Cup	League Trophy	Total
1	FW	(Montserrat)	33	Lyle Taylor	10	2	1	1	14
2	FW	(England)	9	Tom Elliott	9	4	0	0	13
=	FW	(England)	10	Dominic Poleon	8	3	0	2	13
3	MF	(England)	17	Andy Barcham	5	0	0	1	6
=	MF	(England)	18	Dean Parrett	5	1	0	0	6
4	FW	(England)	23	Tyrone Barnett	2	1	0	2	5
5	DF	(England)	6	Paul Robinson	2	1	0	0	3
6	DF	(Wales)	3	Jonathan Meades	2	0	0	0	2
=	MF	(England)	7	George Francomb	2	0	0	0	2
=	DF	(Scotland)	22	Sean Kelly	2	0	0	0	2
=	DF	(England)	32	Darius Charles	2	0	0	0	2
=	MF	(England)	11	Chris Whelpdale	1	0	1	0	2
7	MF	(England)	8	Jake Reeves	1	0	0	0	1
=	DF	(Scotland)	34	Chris Robertson	1	0	0	0	1
TOTALS					52	12	2	6	72

=== Disciplinary record ===
Number	Position	Nation	Name	League One		FA Cup		League Cup		League Trophy		Total	
Number	Position	Nation	Name	Yellow card	Red card	Yellow card	Red card	Yellow card	Red card	Yellow card	Red card	Yellow card	Red card
1	GK	(England)	James Shea	2	0	0	0	0	0	0	0	2	0
2	DF	(England)	Barry Fuller	4	0	0	0	1	0	0	0	5	0
3	DF	(Wales)	Jonathan Meades	3	1	0	0	0	0	0	0	3	1
4	MF	(England)	Dannie Bulman	3	0	0	0	0	0	0	0	3	0
5	DF	(England)	Will Nightingale	1	0	0	0	0	0	1	0	2	0
6	DF	(England)	Paul Robinson	10	0	2	1	0	0	0	0	12	1
7	MF	(England)	George Francomb	6	0	0	0	0	0	0	0	6	0
8	MF	(England)	Jake Reeves	8	0	1	0	1	0	1	0	11	0
9	FW	(England)	Tom Elliott	5	1	1	0	0	0	0	0	6	1
10	FW	(England)	Dominic Poleon	3	0	1	0	0	0	0	0	4	0
11	MF	(England)	Chris Whelpdale	1	0	0	0	0	0	0	0	1	0
14	MF	(England)	Tom Soares	3	0	0	0	0	0	0	0	3	0
16	MF	(England)	Tom Beere	0	0	0	0	0	0	1	0	1	0
17	MF	(England)	Andy Barcham	2	0	0	0	0	0	0	0	2	0
18	MF	(England)	Dean Parrett	6	0	1	0	0	0	0	0	7	0
22	DF	(Scotland)	Sean Kelly	3	0	1	0	0	0	0	0	4	0
23	FW	(England)	Tyrone Barnett	2	0	1	0	0	0	1	0	4	0
31	DF	(England)	Seth Owens	0	0	0	0	0	0	1	0	1	0
32	DF	(England)	Darius Charles	2	0	0	0	0	0	1	0	3	0
33	FW	(Montserrat)	Lyle Taylor	7	1	1	0	0	0	1	0	9	1
34	DF	(Scotland)	Chris Robertson	1	0	1	0	0	0	0	0	2	0
			TOTALS	71	3	10	1	2	0	7	0	90	4

== Transfers ==
Players Transferred In
Date	Position	Nation	Name	Previous club	Fee	Ref.
16 May 2016	MF	(Turkey)	Neşet Bellikli	Academy	Free transfer	
31 May 2016	DF	(England)	Darius Charles	Burton Albion	Free transfer	
21 June 2016	GK	(England)	Ryan Clarke	Northampton Town	Free transfer	
28 June 2016	MF	(England)	Chris Whelpdale	Stevenage	Free transfer	
1 July 2016	MF	(England)	Dean Parrett	Stevenage	Free transfer	
2 July 2016	FW	(England)	Dominic Poleon	Oldham Athletic	Free transfer	
1 August 2016	DF	(Scotland)	Sean Kelly	St Mirren	Free transfer	
3 August 2016	FW	(England)	Tyrone Barnett	Shrewsbury Town	Free transfer	
16 August 2016	DF	(England)	Seth Owens	Brentford	Free transfer	
26 August 2016	DF	(England)	Toby Sibbick	Academy	Free transfer	
2 September 2016	DF	(Scotland)	Chris Robertson	Ross County	Free transfer	
13 January 2017	GK	(England)	Joe Bursík	Academy	Free transfer	
20 January 2017	DF	(England)	Johnville Renee-Pringle	Stoke City	Free transfer	
27 January 2017	MF	(England)	Anthony Hartigan	Academy	Free transfer	
31 January 2017	MF	(England)	Tom Soares	Bury	Undisclosed	
Players Loaned In
Date from	Position	Nation	Name	From	Date to	Ref.
Players Loaned Out
Date from	Position	Nation	Name	To	Date to	Ref.
4 August 2016	MF	(England)	Dan Gallagher	Kingstonian	4 October 2016	
11 November 2016	MF	(England)	David Fitzpatrick	Torquay United	9 January 2017	
11 November 2016	FW	(England)	Toyosi Olusanya	Kingstonian	10 December 2016	
18 November 2016	FW	(England)	George Oakley	Welling United	16 January 2016	
16 December 2016	FW	(Albania)	Egli Kaja	Lewes	16 January 2016	
9 February 2017	MF	(England)	Tom Beere	Gateshead	11 March 2017	
Players Transferred Out
Date	Position	Nation	Name	Subsequent club	Fee	Ref
30 May 2016	FW	(England)	Adebayo Akinfenwa	Wycombe Wanderers	Released	
31 May 2016	DF	(England)	Callum Kennedy	Leyton Orient	Released	
31 May 2016	FW	(England)	Sean Rigg	Newport County	Released	
15 June 2016	FW	(England)	Adebayo Azeez	Partick Thistle	Undisclosed	
21 June 2016	MF	(Republic of Ireland)	Connor Smith	Plymouth Argyle	Undisclosed	
1 July 2016	GK	(England)	Will Mannion	Hull City	Undisclosed	
5 August 2016	DF	(Republic of Ireland)	Ryan Sweeney	Stoke City	£250,000	
21 September 2016	GK	(England)	Ryan Clarke	Eastleigh	Mutual consent	
