= Jonathan Meades (footballer) =

Welsh footballer (born 1992)

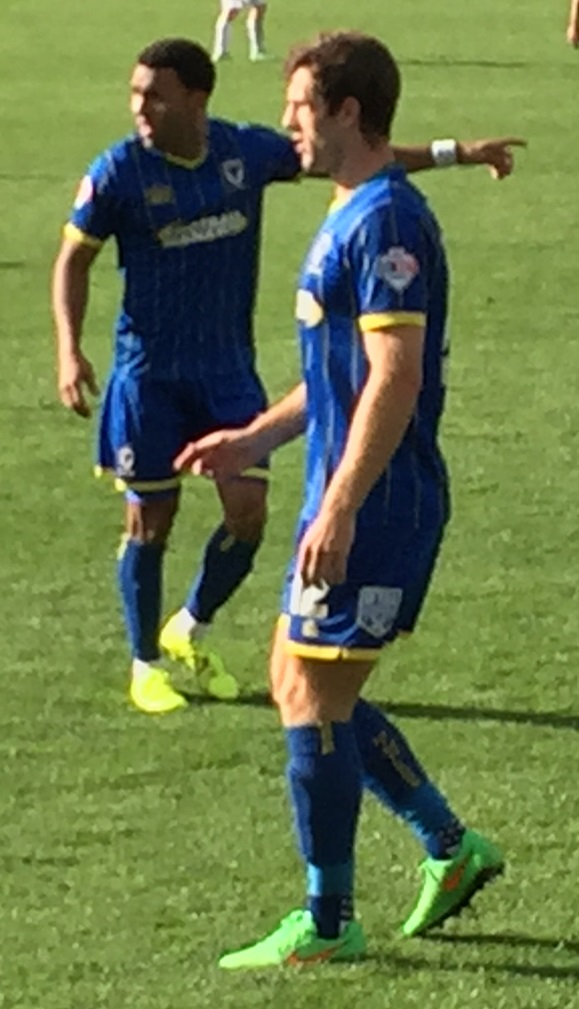
- Meades (front) playing for AFC Wimbledon in September 2015

Personal information
- Full name: Jonathan Charles Meades
- Date of birth: 2 March 1992 (age 34)
- Place of birth: Gloucester, England
- Position: Defender

Youth career
- –2010: Cardiff City

Senior career*
Years	Team	Apps	(Gls)
2010–2012	Cardiff City	0	(0)
2010	→ Moss FK (loan)	10	(1)
2012–2013	AFC Bournemouth	0	(0)
2012–2013	→ AFC Wimbledon (loan)	26	(1)
2013–2015	Oxford United	7	(0)
2015–2018	AFC Wimbledon	91	(7)
Total		134	(9)

International career
2008	Wales U17	1	(0)
2011–2013	Wales U21	4	(0)
- * Club domestic league appearances and goals

Jonathan Charles Meades (born 2 March 1992) is a retired Welsh footballer who last played for AFC Wimbledon in League One. He represented Wales at both under-17 and under-21 level.

== Career ==
=== Early years ===
Meades came through the youth system of Cardiff City under the supervision of then Head of Academy Neal Ardley. On 19 August 2010, it was announced that the 18-year-old defender would go on a three-month loan deal to Norwegian football club Moss FK who at that time were playing in the Adeccoligaen. The defender made his debut for Moss FK on 22 August 2010 in a 2–0 win at home over Alta IF. Although he was sent off after a second bookable offence in the 84th minute, he was still named as man of the match. Having served his one-match suspension, Meades made a further 9 appearances for the Kællan, scoring once in a 4–2 defeat by Tromsdalen UIL on 10 October 2010. Meades was released by Cardiff manager Malky Mackay at the end of the 2011–12 season having failed to break into the first team after being plagued by injuries, suffering patellar tendonitis in his knee and having to have an operation on his calf.

=== AFC Bournemouth ===
The left-back featured twice for AFC Bournemouth during pre-season whilst on trial, against Havant & Waterlooville and Reading respectively. His performances were enough to impress then manager Paul Groves and he signed a two-year contract with the Cherries on 9 August 2012. However, Meades failed to break into the first team and on 5 November 2012 new Bournemouth manager Eddie Howe loaned him to League Two side AFC Wimbledon. On 20 May 2013, it was announced that Meades had left Bournemouth after his contract was terminated by mutual consent.

Meades' initial two-month deal at AFC Wimbledon saw him joining then teammate Steven Gregory and former Cherries captain Warren Cummings and reunited him with Neal Ardley, who had left his post as Head of the Cardiff City Academy to become manager of AFC Wimbledon on 10 October 2012. Meades made his senior Football League debut for AFC Wimbledon on 6 November in a 2–0 loss to Exeter City. With Meades having established himself as a regular in the starting XI, it was announced on 8 January 2013 that Ardley had extended Meades' loan spell with AFC Wimbledon by a further month. On 31 January 2013, it was announced that AFC Wimbledon had once again extended Meades' loan from Bournemouth until the end of the 2012–13 season. On 20 April 2013, Meades scored his first Football League goal in a 2–2 draw with 2012–13 Football League Two Champions Gillingham. Meades capped the end of a successful loan spell on 27 April 2013, the final day of the 2012–13 Football League Two season, by helping AFC Wimbledon to avoid relegation from the Football League after a 2–1 victory over Fleetwood Town. The 21-year-old was subsequently awarded the Natalie Callow Memorial Trophy for AFC Wimbledon's Young Player of the Year, as voted for by the fans.

=== Oxford United ===
On 22 May 2013 Meades joined Football League Two side Oxford United on a two-year deal, having rejected the offer of signing a contract with AFC Wimbledon. He suffered an ankle-ligament injury in a pre-season friendly against Coventry City and he did not appear in the Oxford first team during his first season. He made only seven league appearances (10 in all competitions) for Oxford in 2014–15 and returned on a free transfer to AFC Wimbledon in June 2015.

=== AFC Wimbledon ===
In his second spell at AFC Wimbledon, Meades made 100 appearances, 91 of them in the League, before retiring due to injury after the 2017–18 season, at the age of 26.

== International career ==
Meades was first called up to represent Wales at under-17 level on 17 March 2008, in a 1–1 draw against Slovenia under-17s in the 2008 UEFA European Under-17 Football Championship Elite Round.

Meades made his first appearance for Wales under-21s on 6 September 2011 in a 3–1 defeat by Montenegro under-21s in the qualifying stages of the 2013 UEFA European Under-21 Football Championship, in which he came on as a 74th-minute substitute for Elliott Hewitt. Meades featured once again for Wales under-21s in the UEFA Under-21 qualifying stages on 10 September 2012 as a 76th-minute substitute for Adam Henley in a 5–0 defeat by Czech Republic under-21s. On 6 February 2013, Meades again represented Wales under-21s in a friendly fixture against Iceland under-21s, ending as a 3–0 victory. Meades' fourth cap for the under-21s came on 22 March 2013 in a 1–0 victory over Moldova under-21s in the qualifying stages of the 2015 UEFA European under-21 Football Championship.

== Career statistics ==
As of match played 31 October 2017

Club	Season	League			FA Cup		League Cup		Other		Total	
Club	Season	Division	Apps	Goals	Apps	Goals	Apps	Goals	Apps	Goals	Apps	Goals
AFC Wimbledon (loan)	2012–13	League Two	26	1	0	0	0	0	0	0	26	1
Oxford United	2014–15	League Two	7	0	1	0	1	0	1 (Note: Appearance in the Football League Trophy.)	0	10	0
AFC Wimbledon	2015–16	League Two	41	3	1	0	1	0	1 (Note: Appearance in the League Two play-offs)	0	44	3
AFC Wimbledon	2016–17	League One	24	2	2	0	0	0	0	0	26	2
AFC Wimbledon	2017–18	League One	26	2	3	0	0	0	1	0	30	2
AFC Wimbledon	Wimbledon total		91	7	6	0	1	0	2	0	100	7
Career total			124	8	7	0	2	0	3	0	136	8

== Honours ==
AFC Wimbledon

- Football League Two play-offs: 2016
