= Christian Toonga =

English footballer

Personal information
- Full name: Elvis Christian Yonwa-Toonga
- Date of birth: 20 November 1997 (age 28)
- Place of birth: Newham, London, England
- Position: Midfielder

Youth career
- 2005–2013: Arsenal
- 2013–2014: Southampton
- 2014–2015: Cardiff City

Senior career*
Years	Team	Apps	(Gls)
2015–2016	AFC Wimbledon	4	(0)
- * Club domestic league appearances and goals as of 15:59, 17 July 2016 (UTC)

Elvis Christian Yonwa-Toonga (born 20 November 1997) is an English professional footballer who plays central midfielder.

== Playing career ==
Born in London, Toonga joined Arsenal's youth system at the age of 8. After being released in 2013 at age 16, he had short spells at Southampton and Cardiff City before signing a professional deal with AFC Wimbledon on 12, June 2015.

On 24, October 2015 Toonga made his Football League debut, coming on as a late substitute for Lyle Taylor in a 3–1 away win against York City. On 11 March 2016, he left the club by mutual consent.

== Prison ==
On 17, July 2017, Toonga was arrested and spent two and a half years in prison for dealing with heroin and cocaine.
