= Joe McDonnell (footballer) =

English footballer (born 1994)

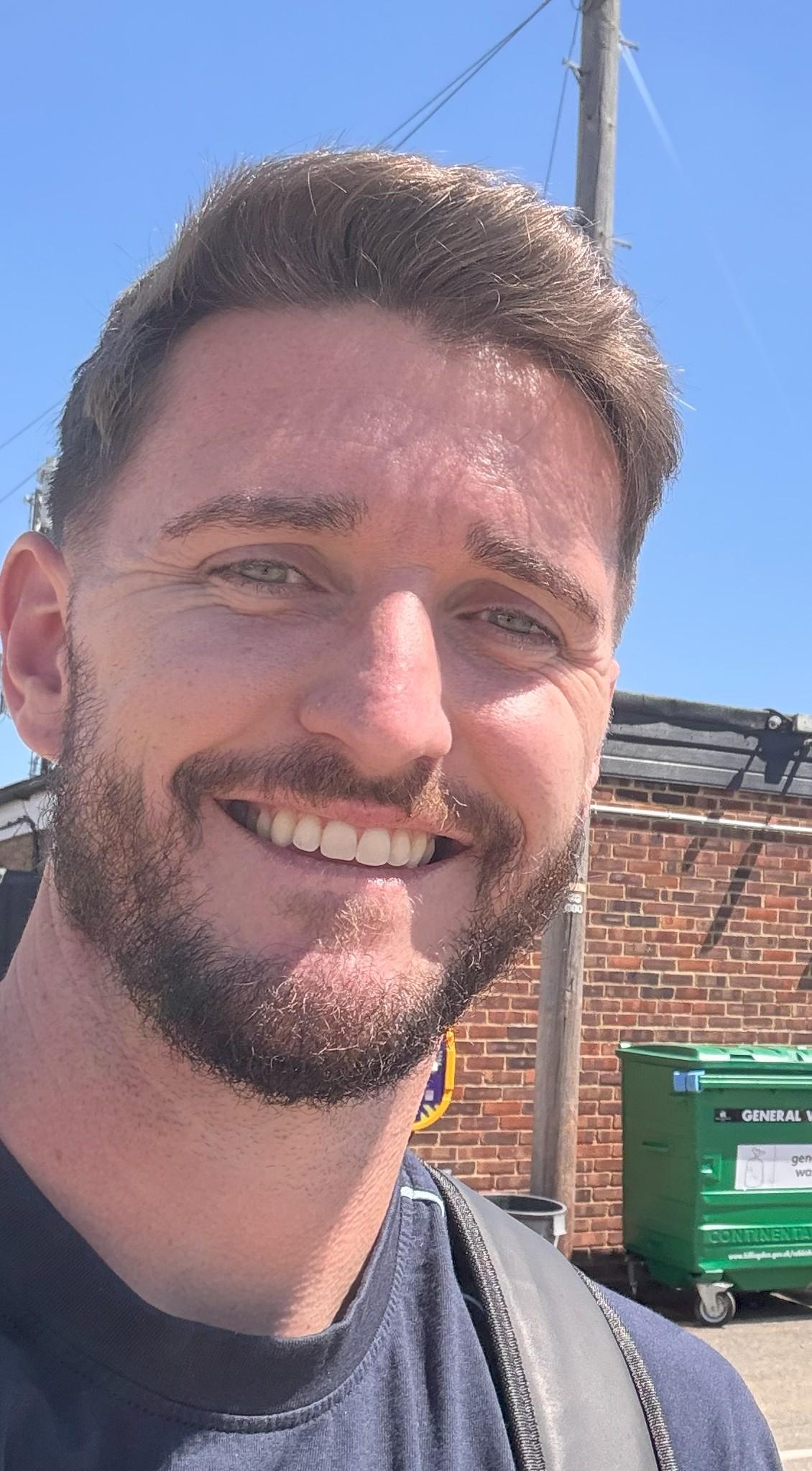
- Joe McDonnell in 2025.

Personal information
- Full name: Joseph Patrick McDonnell
- Date of birth: 19 May 1994 (age 32)
- Place of birth: Basingstoke, England
- Height: 1.89 m (6 ft 2 in)
- Position: Goalkeeper

Team information
- Current team: AFC Wimbledon
- Number: 20

Youth career
- 2011–2012: Basingstoke Town

Senior career*
Years	Team	Apps	(Gls)
2012–2014	Basingstoke Town	6	(0)
2013	→ Hendon (loan)	16	(0)
2014–2020	AFC Wimbledon	23	(0)
2016	→ Hampton & Richmond Borough (loan)	2	(0)
2016	→ Harrow Borough (loan)	14	(0)
2020	Notts County	6	(0)
2020–2025	Eastleigh	223	(0)
2022	→ Solihull Moors (loan)	2	(0)
2023	→ Boreham Wood (loan)	0	(0)
2025–	AFC Wimbledon	15	(0)
- * Club domestic league appearances and goals as of 16:00, 8 May 2025 (UTC)

Joseph Patrick McDonnell (born 19 May 1994) is an English professional footballer who plays as a goalkeeper for AFC Wimbledon.

== Career ==
=== Basingstoke Town ===
McDonnell came through the ranks at Basingstoke Town under the guidance of academy manager Jason Bristow, who gave him his first contract after playing amateur cricket up until around the age of 16 or 17. McDonnell was also previously coached by current AFC Wimbledon goalkeeping coach Ashley Bayes at Basingstoke, who he credits with influencing him to become a goalkeeper.

After graduating from the Basingstoke academy, McDonnell made two league appearances for the Dragons during the 2012–13 season, and a further four the following season, as well as spending time on loan at Hendon. He made a total of twelve appearances for Basingstoke Town in all competitions.

=== AFC Wimbledon ===
In July 2014, he signed a professional contract at AFC Wimbledon after turning down interest from other clubs. After featuring as a mainstay on Wimbledon's bench for the first half of the season, McDonnell made his first team début on 14 February 2015, coming on as a 23rd-minute substitute in the 2–0 away loss to Shrewsbury Town after James Shea was stretchered off.

He was released by Wimbledon at the end of the 2018-19 season. However, on 2 August 2019, he re-signed for the club on a short-term contract after an injury to first choice goalkeeper Nathan Trott.

=== Notts County ===
On 3 February 2020, McDonnell signed for Notts County, on a contract until the end of the current season.

=== Eastleigh ===
On 14 August 2020, McDonnell signed for Eastleigh. After appearing in every minute of the National League as of the awards ceremony as well as every minute in the FA Cup, McDonnell was awarded the Eastleigh Player of the Season award.

On 18 June 2021, McDonnel signed a contract extension for Eastleigh till the end of the 2022–23 season.

He departed the club at the end of the 2024–25 season.

=== AFC Wimbledon ===
On 26 June 2025, AFC Wimbledon announced McDonnell had returned on a two-year contract.

== Statistics ==
As of end of 2024–25 season

Appearances and goals by club, season and competition
Club	Season	League			FA Cup		League Cup		Other		Total	
Club	Season	Division	Apps	Goals	Apps	Goals	Apps	Goals	Apps	Goals	Apps	Goals
AFC Wimbledon	2014–15	League Two	4	0	0	0	0	0	0	0	4	0
AFC Wimbledon	2015–16	League Two	0	0	0	0	0	0	0	0	0	0
AFC Wimbledon	2016–17	League One	3	0	0	0	0	0	2 (Note: Appearances in the Football League Trophy)	0	5	0
AFC Wimbledon	2017–18	League One	1	0	0	0	0	0	4	0	5	0
AFC Wimbledon	2018–19	League One	14	0	2	0	0	0	2	0	18	0
AFC Wimbledon	2019–20	League One	1	0	0	0	0	0	1	0	2	0
AFC Wimbledon	Total		23	0	2	0	0	0	9	0	34	0
Notts County	2019–20	National League	6	0	0	0	—		2 (Note: Appearance(s) in FA Trophy)	0	8	0
Eastleigh	2020–21	National League	43	0	2	0	—		0	0	45	0
Eastleigh	2021–22	National League	42	0	3	0	—		2	0	47	0
Eastleigh	2022–23	National League	46	0	2	0	—		3	0	51	0
Eastleigh	2023–24	National League	45	0	5	0	—		0	0	50	0
Eastleigh	2024–25	National League	46	0	1	0	—		3	0	50	0
Eastleigh	Total		222	0	13	0	0	0	8	0	243	0
Solihull Moors (loan)	2021–22	National League	4	0	0	0	—		0	0	4	0
Boreham Wood (loan)	2022–23	National League	0	0	0	0	—		1 (Note: Appearance(s) in National League play-offs)	0	1	0
Career Total			255	0	15	0	0	0	20	0	290	0

== Honours ==
Individual

- Eastleigh Player of the Season: 2020–21
