= Dan Gallagher (footballer) =

English footballer

Daniel Gallagher
Personal information
- Full name: Daniel Lee Gallagher
- Date of birth: 20 June 1997 (age 29)
- Place of birth: Epsom, England
- Position: Midfielder

Team information
- Current team: Dorking Wanderers
- Number: 20

Youth career
- 2007–2015: AFC Wimbledon

Senior career*
| Years | Team | Apps | (Gls) |
| 2015–2017 | AFC Wimbledon | 1 | (0) |
| 2016 | → Kingstonian (loan) | 8 | (0) |
| 2017–2019 | Leatherhead | 87 | (5) |
| 2019– | Dorking Wanderers | 188 | (5) |
- * Club domestic league appearances and goals as of 19:12, 18 February 2026 (UTC)

Daniel Lee Gallagher (born 20 June 1997) is an English professional footballer who plays as a midfielder and Captain of Dorking Wanderers.

== Club career ==
Having played for AFC Wimbledon since age ten, Gallagher made his Football league début for AFC Wimbledon on 14 April 2015, coming on as a late substitute during the 1–1 away draw with Plymouth Argyle. Gallagher signed his first professional contract with AFC Wimbledon in February 2015.

On 4 August 2016, Gallagher joined Isthmian League side and neighbours, Kingstonian on a one-month loan. Just under a week later, he made his debut during a 1–0 defeat to Harlow Town, playing the full 90 minutes. On 1 September 2016, his loan was extended for a further month. During this following month, Gallagher went onto feature four more times before returning to Wimbledon in October.

Following his release from Wimbledon, Gallagher opted to return to the Isthmian League, to join Leatherhead in July 2017. Gallagher joined Leatherhead's neighbours Dorking Wanderers in August 2019.

After the signing of Tony Craig from Crawley Town, Gallagher moved into a defensive midfielder role and quickly found himself as one of the first names on the team sheet. He made the England C provisional squad as well as also winning the Manager's Player of the Year for the 2022–23 season.

== Personal life ==
Dan is the younger brother of twins; Jake and Josh, who play for and manage Isthmian South Central side Raynes Park Vale respectively, and the older brother of Tottenham Hotspur and England footballer, Conor.

== Career statistics ==
As of 17 February 2026.

Appearances and goals by club, season and competition
| Club | Season | League | | | FA Cup | | EFL Cup | | Other | | Total | |
| Club | Season | Division | Apps | Goals | Apps | Goals | Apps | Goals | Apps | Goals | Apps | Goals |
|---|---|---|---|---|---|---|---|---|---|---|---|---|
| AFC Wimbledon | 2014–15 | League Two | 1 | 0 | 0 | 0 | 0 | 0 | 0 | 0 | 1 | 0 |
| AFC Wimbledon | 2015–16 | League Two | 0 | 0 | 0 | 0 | 0 | 0 | 1 (Note: Appearance in the Football League Trophy) | 0 | 1 | 0 |
| AFC Wimbledon | 2016–17 | League One | 0 | 0 | — | | 0 | 0 | 0 | 0 | 0 | 0 |
| AFC Wimbledon | Total | | 1 | 0 | 0 | 0 | 0 | 0 | 1 | 0 | 2 | 0 |
| Kingstonian (loan) | 2016–17 | Isthmian League Premier Division | 8 | 0 | 1 | 0 | — | | 1 (Note: Appearance in the Alan Turvey Trophy) | 0 | 10 | 0 |
| Leatherhead | 2017–18 | Isthmian League Premier Division | 41 | 2 | 5 | 1 | — | | 1 (Note: Appearance in the FA Trophy) | 0 | 47 | 3 |
| Leatherhead | 2018–19 | Isthmian League Premier Division | 41 | 2 | 5 | 0 | — | | 2 (Note: One appearance in the Alan Turvey Trophy, one in the FA Trophy) | 0 | 48 | 2 |
| Leatherhead | 2019–20 | Isthmian League Premier Division | 5 | 1 | 0 | 0 | — | | 0 | 0 | 5 | 1 |
| Leatherhead | Total | | 87 | 5 | 10 | 1 | — | | 3 | 0 | 100 | 5 |
| Dorking Wanderers | 2019–20 | National League South | 23 | 0 | 1 | 0 | — | | 7 (Note: Five appearances in the FA Trophy, two in the National League South play-offs) | 0 | 31 | 0 |
| Dorking Wanderers | 2020–21 | National League South | 12 | 0 | 0 | 0 | — | | 2 | 0 | 14 | 0 |
| Dorking Wanderers | 2021–22 | National League South | 32 | 2 | 4 | 0 | — | | 3 (Note: One appearance in the FA Trophy, two in the National League South play-offs) | 0 | 39 | 2 |
| Dorking Wanderers | 2022–23 | National League | 38 | 3 | 1 | 1 | — | | 3 | 0 | 42 | 4 |
| Dorking Wanderers | 2023–24 | National League | 27 | 0 | 1 | 0 | — | | 2 | 0 | 30 | 0 |
| Dorking Wanderers | 2024–25 | National League South | 37 | 0 | 1 | 0 | — | | 2 (Note: One appearance in the FA Trophy, one in the National League South play-offs) | 0 | 40 | 0 |
| Dorking Wanderers | 2025–26 | National League South | 19 | 0 | 2 | 0 | — | | 2 | 0 | 23 | 0 |
| Dorking Wanderers | 2026–27 | National League South | 0 | 0 | 0 | 0 | — | | 0 | 0 | 0 | 0 |
| Dorking Wanderers | Total | | 188 | 5 | 10 | 1 | — | | 21 | 0 | 219 | 6 |
| Career total | | | 284 | 10 | 21 | 2 | 0 | 0 | 26 | 0 | 331 | 12 |
