= Lyle Taylor =

Montserratian footballer (born 1990)

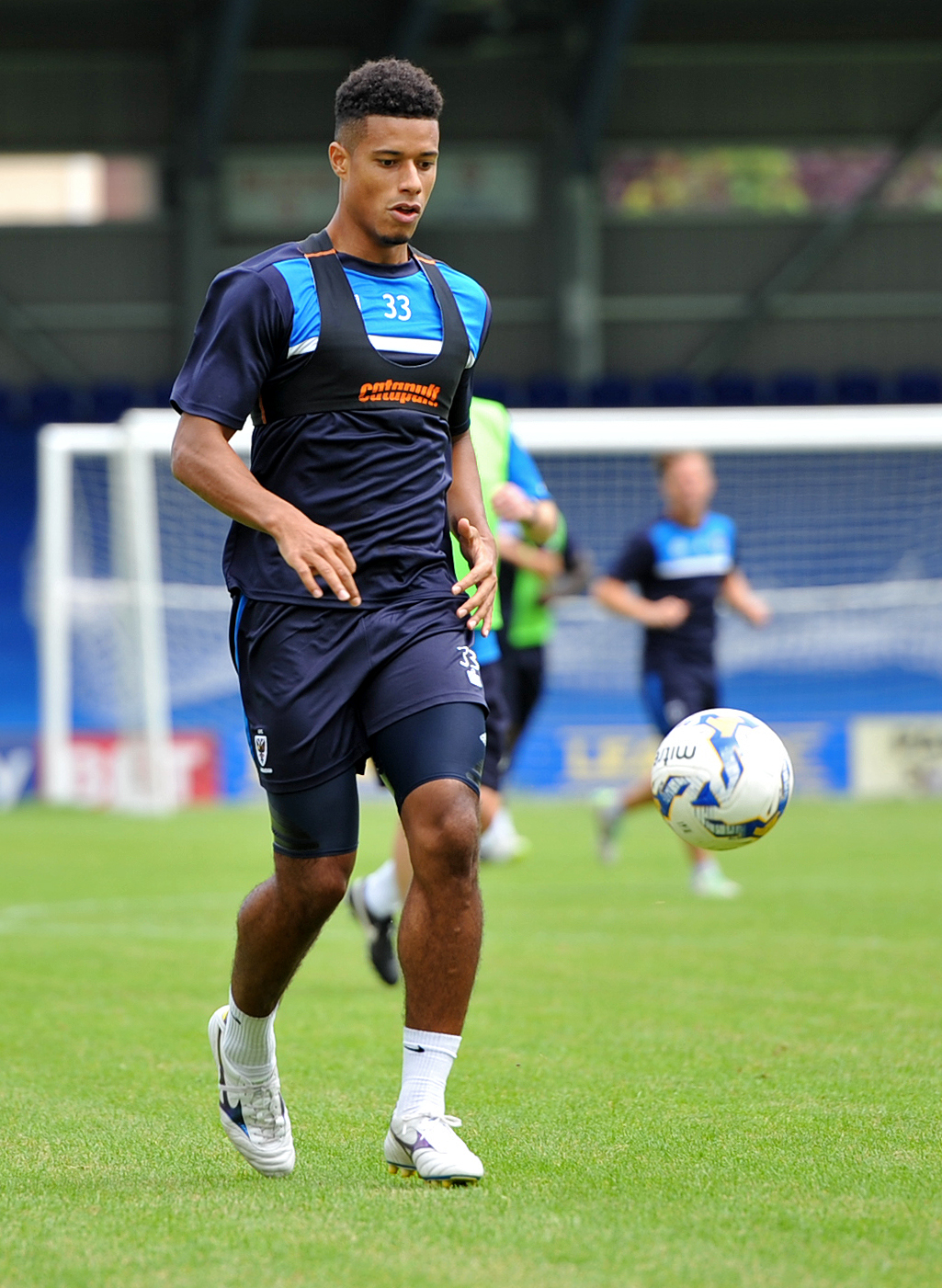
- Taylor playing for AFC Wimbledon in 2015

Personal information
- Full name: Lyle Gray James Alfred Taylor
- Date of birth: 29 March 1990 (age 36)
- Place of birth: Greenwich, England
- Height: 6 ft 2 in (1.88 m)
- Position: Striker

Team information
- Current team: Chelmsford City
- Number: 33

Youth career
- Glebe
- Staines Town
- –2007: Millwall

Senior career*
Years	Team	Apps	(Gls)
2007–2009	Millwall	0	(0)
2008	→ Eastbourne Borough (loan)	4	(1)
2009	→ Croydon Athletic (loan)	4	(0)
2009–2010	Concord Rangers	37	(23)
2010–2012	AFC Bournemouth	29	(0)
2011	→ Lewes (loan)	6	(2)
2011	→ Woking (loan)	5	(1)
2012	→ Hereford United (loan)	8	(2)
2012–2013	Falkirk	34	(24)
2013–2014	Sheffield United	20	(2)
2014	→ Partick Thistle (loan)	20	(7)
2014–2015	Scunthorpe United	18	(3)
2015	→ Partick Thistle (loan)	15	(3)
2015–2018	AFC Wimbledon	131	(44)
2018–2020	Charlton Athletic	63	(32)
2020–2023	Nottingham Forest	57	(7)
2022	→ Birmingham City (loan)	14	(5)
2023–2024	Wycombe Wanderers	7	(0)
2024	Cambridge United	14	(3)
2024–2025	Colchester United	37	(10)
2025–	Chelmsford City	44	(21)

International career^{‡}
2015–	Montserrat	24	(17)
- * Club domestic league appearances and goals as of 17:10, 28 October 2026 (UTC) ‡ National team caps and goals as of 05:17, 7 October 2026 (UTC+8)

Lyle James Alfred Taylor (born 29 March 1990) is a professional footballer who plays as a striker for National League South club Chelmsford City. Born in England, he plays for the Montserrat national team.

Prior to joining Nottingham Forest, he played for Charlton Athletic and AFC Wimbledon. During his time with the Dons, he became their record Football League goalscorer with 44 goals (since surpassed by Joe Pigott).

Taylor started his senior club career at Millwall before spells with Concord Rangers, AFC Bournemouth, Falkirk, Sheffield United, and Scunthorpe United. He has also spent time on loan at Eastbourne Borough, Croydon Athletic, Lewes, Hereford United, Woking, two spells at Partick Thistle, and Birmingham City.

== Club career ==
=== Millwall ===
Taylor was spotted by Millwall whilst playing for Staines Town youth academy, and progressed from the Millwall U18s to the reserve team. In October 2008 he signed a one-month loan deal at Conference National side Eastbourne Borough in order to gain first team experience. In November 2008 his loan was extended by another month. Although he played five games, he had only scored one goal, against Stevenage Borough. Eastbourne Borough coach Nick Greenwood decided to end the loan deal, stating Taylor was not ready for Conference starts, as he was still learning his trade.

=== Concord Rangers and AFC Bournemouth ===
Taylor's contract at Millwall expired on 1 July 2009, after which he signed for Concord Rangers. After scoring 34 goals in his first season for Rangers, Taylor was offered a trial with AFC Bournemouth, and subsequently agreed a two-year deal with the south-coast club. He made his Football League debut the following day, in a 3–3 draw against Notts County. However, Taylor struggled to hold down a regular first-team place and appeared to be surplus to requirements.

On 31 January 2011, Taylor signed a one-month loan deal with Isthmian League side Lewes, a deal which was extended the following month. On 7 February 2011, Taylor scored on his Lewes debut, in a 2–2 draw against Boreham Wood. Despite his initial success, in March 2011, Taylor refused to extend his stay at Lewes any further, describing it as a "big risk". Despite public support from assistant manager Steve Fletcher who insisted he had a future at the club, Taylor failed to break into the Bournemouth team. Taylor then joined Woking at the end of March, agreeing a loan deal until the end of the season.

At the start of the 2011–12 season, and following promising performances in pre-season, Taylor scored a brace against Dagenham & Redbridge in the first round of the League Cup. Still unable to force his way into the Bournemouth first–team, in February 2012 Taylor was allowed to leave on loan once more, agreeing a one-month deal with Hereford United. He scored twice in eight appearances for Hereford before returning to his parent club at the end of his loan spell. Taylor was released by Bournemouth at the end of the season having netted just two cup goals in the two years he was at the club.

=== Falkirk ===
In July 2012, Taylor signed for Scottish side Falkirk, scoring twice on his competitive debut in the Scottish Challenge Cup, in a 3–0 win over Stirling Albion. Taylor also scored on his league debut in a 3–1 defeat against Partick Thistle on 11 August 2012. After a successful season, Taylor attracted interest from elsewhere, with Falkirk accepting an offer from English League One side Rotherham United, only for Taylor to reject the move as he could not agree personal terms with the club.

=== Sheffield United ===
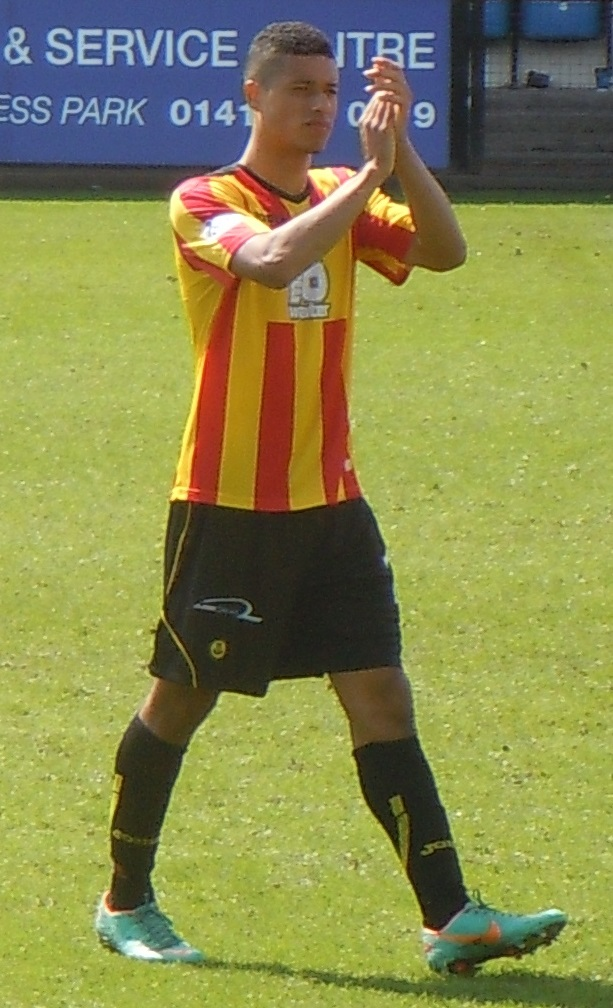
Taylor playing for Partick Thistle in 2014

Following the collapse of Taylor's proposed move to Rotherham United, Falkirk accepted another offer, this time from Sheffield United and Taylor duly signed a two-year deal for an undisclosed fee. Taylor made his debut for the Blades in the opening fixture of the following season, coming on as a second-half substitute in a 2–1 home victory over Notts County. Unable to hold down a regular place in the side Taylor did not score for his new employers until mid-October when he netted a brace against Coventry City.

With the arrival of new manager Nigel Clough at United, Taylor continued to find his first team chances limited and was eventually allowed to join Scottish Premiership side Partick Thistle on loan until the end of the season. Having made his debut for Thistle in a 1–0 away loss to Celtic, Taylor netted his first goal for the Jags in his second game a 2–0 away win against Hearts a few days later. Taylor played 20 games for Thistle in total that season, scoring seven goals, before returning to England in the summer.

=== Scunthorpe United ===
With first-team opportunities apparently limited at Sheffield United, Taylor joined Scunthorpe United for an undisclosed fee on 30 June 2014. Taylor made his United debut on 9 August 2014, in a 3–1 defeat against Swindon Town. He made his home debut on 16 August, in a 0–4 defeat against Preston North End. He scored his first goal for the club on 16 September 2014, in a 2–1 win against Coventry City. He scored his second goal for the club in a 2–2 draw against Port Vale on 21 October. He played 12 times for United in the league that season, scoring three goals as they finished 16th.

On 2 February 2015, Taylor returned to Partick Thistle for a second loan spell. He scored in his first game back at the club, on 7 February 2015, in a 2–1 defeat against Inverness CT in the Scottish Cup. He scored his first league goal in a 3–1 home defeat against Ross County. Taylor then scored twice in a 2–0 home win over Motherwell on 11 April 2015.

=== AFC Wimbledon ===
On 14 July 2015, 25-year-old Taylor signed for AFC Wimbledon from Scunthorpe United for an undisclosed fee. On 1 September, he scored his first goal for the club in a 3–2 loss to Plymouth Argyle in the Football League Trophy. Taylor scored his first league goal in a 2–0 win over Barnet on 3 October 2015 and scored a double in a 4–3 away win at Accrington. He continued to score freely as the Dons finished 7th in League Two, ensuring a spot in the play-offs. He played in both semi-final legs of the 3–2 aggregate win against Accrington Stanley, scoring the equaliser in extra-time in the second leg which sent the Dons to Wembley. He scored the opening goal in AFC Wimbledon's 2–0 win over Plymouth Argyle in the 2015–16 League Two play-off final, plundering 23 goals and seven assists in all competitions in his first season for the club, as the Dons gained promotion to League One.

On 30 August 2016, Taylor signed an extended deal with the club. Taylor notched 14 goals and six assists in all competitions in his second season for the club as AFC Wimbledon finished safely in 15th in its debut season in League One in 2016–17.

Taylor scored his 50th goal for the club against Plymouth on 13 February 2018, netting a brace in a 4–2 loss. He scored 18 goals and eight assists in all competitions in his third season for the club as AFC Wimbledon battled relegation by finishing in 18th in its second season in League One in 2017–18.

Taylor became AFC Wimbledon's record Football League goalscorer with 44 goals (since overtaken by Joe Pigott), and remains the Dons highest scorer during their Football League era with 55 goals in all competitions.

During his time at AFC Wimbledon, Taylor was given the nickname "The Montserratian Messi" by author and AFC Wimbledon fan John Green, on Dear Hank & John, the weekly podcast he co-hosts.

=== Charlton Athletic ===
Taylor signed for AFC Wimbledon's League One rivals Charlton Athletic on 27 June 2018 on a two-year deal.

In April 2019, Taylor was the victim of racist abuse on Twitter from an apparent Bradford City fan following the clubs' recent match. Bradford City said they would investigate the matter.

"We have 15 out of contract - we've got six loans and nine of our own contracted players out [...] Lyle has said that he's not going to play because of risk of injury. He is going to get a life-changing move."

— Lee Bowyer, in an interview with Talksport.

On 1 June 2020, Charlton manager Lee Bowyer confirmed Taylor had refused to sign short term extension with the club to see out the rest of the 2019–20 EFL Championship season, he also refused to see out his existing contract for the next three matches for Charlton Athletic. Following the suspension of the season due to the COVID-19 pandemic in the United Kingdom, as he did not want to risk injury. On 2 July 2020, it was confirmed that Taylor had left Charlton after his contract expired.

=== Nottingham Forest ===
On 15 August 2020, Taylor joined Championship club Nottingham Forest on a free transfer. He signed a contract of undisclosed length. Taylor made his first Forest start in a 1–0 defeat to Huddersfield Town on 25 September 2020. He scored his first goal for Forest in a 1–1 draw with rivals Derby County on 23 October 2020.

Taylor was released by Forest following their 2022–23 season, in which he made no appearances.

==== Birmingham City (loan) ====
On 27 January 2022, Taylor joined Birmingham City on loan for the rest of the 2021–22 season. He scored against Derby County on his debut for the club, and finished his loan spell with five goals from 14 appearances.

=== Wycombe Wanderers ===
On 15 November 2023, Taylor joined League One club Wycombe Wanderers on a short-term deal on a free transfer. He departed the club in January 2024.

=== Cambridge United ===
On 12 January 2024, Taylor joined League One club Cambridge United on a short-term deal until the end of the 2023–24 season.

On 1 May 2024, the club announced the player would be released at the end of his contract.

=== Colchester United ===
On 2 July 2024, Taylor signed a contract with Colchester United until the end of the 2024–25 season.

=== Chelmsford City ===
On 7 August 2025, Taylor signed for National League South club Chelmsford City, following his departure from Colchester United on the same day.

== International career ==
In March 2015, Taylor was called up to play for Montserrat in their qualification matches for the 2018 FIFA World Cup, being eligible through his grandparents. He made his full International début against Curaçao on 27 March 2015, scoring his first international goal.

== Personal life ==
Taylor's brother, defender Joey Taylor, also plays for the Montserrat national football team.

Taylor has also worked as a model and appeared in TV advertisements for the Champions League.

Known for his charity work, Taylor often dyes his hair pink and wears pink boots during the month of October to raise awareness and money for Cancer Research UK. As of 2024, Taylor has raised £78,000 for the charity.

Taylor has refused to follow the EFL initiative to take the knee before football matches. In an interview, Taylor described Black Lives Matter as a 'Marxist group' that 'are using racial unrest to push their own political agenda', and said that he felt sorry for white players.

== Career statistics ==
=== Club ===
As of match played 14 April 2026

Appearances and goals by club, season and competition
Club	Season	Division	League		FA Cup		League Cup		Other		Total	
Club	Season	Division	Apps	Goals	Apps	Goals	Apps	Goals	Apps	Goals	Apps	Goals
Millwall	2007–08	League One	0	0	0	0	0	0	0	0	0	0
Millwall	2008–09	League One	0	0	0	0	0	0	0	0	0	0
Millwall	Total		0	0	0	0	0	0	0	0	0	0
Eastbourne Borough (loan)	2008–09	Conference Premier	4	1	1	0	—		0	0	5	1
Croydon Athletic (loan)	2008–09	Isthmian League Div. One South	4	0	—		—		—		4	0
Concord Rangers	2009–10	Isthmian League Div. One North	37	23	4	2	—		8 (Note: Three appearances & five goals in FA Trophy; two appearances & three goals in Essex Senior Cup; one appearance in Isthmian League Cup; two appearances & one goal in Isthmian League Division One North play-offs)	9	49	34
AFC Bournemouth	2010–11	League One	11	0	1	0	0	0	1 (Note: Appearance(s) in Football League Trophy)	0	13	0
AFC Bournemouth	2011–12	League One	18	0	0	0	2	2	1	0	21	2
AFC Bournemouth	Total		29	0	1	0	2	2	2	0	34	2
Lewes (loan)	2010–11	Conference South	6	2	—		—		—		6	2
Woking (loan)	2010–11	Conference South	5	1	—		—		2 (Note: Appearances in Conference South play-offs)	0	7	1
Hereford United (loan)	2011–12	League Two	8	2	—		—		—		8	2
Falkirk	2012–13	Scottish First Division	34	24	4	2	2	1	2 (Note: Appearances in Scottish Challenge Cup)	2	42	29
Sheffield United	2013–14	League One	20	2	2	0	1	0	2	0	25	2
Partick Thistle (loan)	2013–14	Scottish Premiership	20	7	—		—		—		20	7
Scunthorpe United	2014–15	League One	18	3	5	1	1	0	1	0	25	4
Partick Thistle (loan)	2014–15	Scottish Premiership	15	3	1	1	—		—		16	4
AFC Wimbledon	2015–16	League Two	42	20	1	0	1	0	4 (Note: One appearance & one goal in Football League Trophy; three appearances & two goals in League Two playoffs)	3	48	23
AFC Wimbledon	2016–17	League One	43	10	5	2	1	1	1	1	50	14
AFC Wimbledon	2017–18	League One	46	14	3	3	1	0	2	1	52	18
AFC Wimbledon	Total		131	44	9	5	3	1	7	5	150	55
Charlton Athletic	2018–19	League One	41	21	1	3	0	0	3 (Note: Appearances in League One play-offs)	1	45	25
Charlton Athletic	2019–20	Championship	22	11	0	0	0	0	—		22	11
Charlton Athletic	Total		63	32	1	3	0	0	3	1	67	36
Nottingham Forest	2020–21	Championship	39	4	2	1	1	0	—		42	5
Nottingham Forest	2021–22	Championship	18	3	0	0	1	0	—		19	3
Nottingham Forest	2022–23	Premier League	0	0	0	0	0	0	—		0	0
Nottingham Forest	Total		57	7	2	1	2	0	0	0	61	8
Birmingham City (loan)	2021–22	Championship	14	5	—		—		—		14	5
Wycombe Wanderers	2023–24	League One	7	0	1	0	—		1 (Note: Appearance(s) in EFL Trophy)	0	9	0
Cambridge United	2023–24	League One	14	3	—		—		—		14	3
Colchester United	2024–25	League Two	37	10	1	0	0	0	2	3	40	13
Chelmsford City	2025–26	National League South	36	20	4	8	—		0	0	40	28
Career total			556	187	35	21	11	4	30	20	632	232

=== International ===
As of match played 6 October 2026

Appearances and goals by national team and year
National team	Year	Apps	Goals
Montserrat	2015	2	1
Montserrat	2018	2	0
Montserrat	2019	2	0
Montserrat	2021	5	6
Montserrat	2022	2	3
Montserrat	2023	3	2
Montserrat	2024	4	1
Montserrat	2026	4	4
Total		24	17

Scores and results list Montserrat's goal tally first, score column indicates score after each Taylor goal.

List of international goals scored by Lyle Taylor
No.	Date	Venue	Opponent	Score	Result	Competition
1	27 March 2015	Ergilio Hato Stadium, Willemstad, Curaçao	Curaçao	1–1	1–2	2018 FIFA World Cup qualification
2	24 March 2021	Ergilio Hato Stadium, Willemstad, Curaçao	Antigua and Barbuda	1–0	2–2	2022 FIFA World Cup qualification
3	24 March 2021	Ergilio Hato Stadium, Willemstad, Curaçao	Antigua and Barbuda	2–1	2–2	2022 FIFA World Cup qualification
4	28 March 2021	Ergilio Hato Stadium, Willemstad, Curaçao	El Salvador	1–1	1–1	2022 FIFA World Cup qualification
5	8 June 2021	Kirani James Athletic Stadium, St. George's, Grenada	Grenada	1–1	2–1	2022 FIFA World Cup qualification
6	8 June 2021	Kirani James Athletic Stadium, St. George's, Grenada	Grenada	2–1	2–1	2022 FIFA World Cup qualification
7	3 July 2021	DRV PNK Stadium, Fort Lauderdale, United States	Trinidad and Tobago	1–3	1–6	2021 CONCACAF Gold Cup qualification
8	7 June 2022	Félix Sánchez Olympic Stadium, Santo Domingo, Dominican Republic	Haiti	2–3	2–3	2022–23 CONCACAF Nations League B
9	11 June 2022	Félix Sánchez Olympic Stadium, Santo Domingo, Dominican Republic	Bermuda	1–0	3–2	2022–23 CONCACAF Nations League B
10	11 June 2022	Félix Sánchez Olympic Stadium, Santo Domingo, Dominican Republic	Bermuda	3–2	3–2	2022–23 CONCACAF Nations League B
11	8 September 2023	Wildey Turf, Wildey, Barbados	Barbados	1–0	3–2	2023–24 CONCACAF Nations League B
12	8 September 2023	Wildey Turf, Wildey, Barbados	Barbados	3–2	3–2	2023–24 CONCACAF Nations League B
13	10 October 2024	Arnos Vale Stadium, Kingstown, Saint Vincent and the Grenadines	Bonaire	1–0	1–0	2024–25 CONCACAF Nations League B
14	26 September 2026	TCIFA National Academy, Providenciales, Turks and Caicos Islands	British Virgin Islands	2–0	3–0	2026–27 CONCACAF Nations League C
15	26 September 2026	TCIFA National Academy, Providenciales, Turks and Caicos Islands	British Virgin Islands	3–0	3–0	2026–27 CONCACAF Nations League C
16	6 October 2026	TCIFA National Academy, Providenciales, Turks and Caicos Islands	Turks and Caicos Islands	1–0	4–1	2026–27 CONCACAF Nations League C
17	6 October 2026	TCIFA National Academy, Providenciales, Turks and Caicos Islands	Turks and Caicos Islands	2–0	4–1	2026–27 CONCACAF Nations League C

== Honours ==
AFC Wimbledon

- Football League Two play-offs: 2016

Charlton Athletic

- EFL League One play-offs: 2019

Nottingham Forest

- EFL Championship play-offs: 2022

Individual

- PFA Fans' Player of the Year: 2018–19 League One
- National League South Team of the Year: 2025–26
- Charlton Athletic Player of the Year: 2018–19
