= Malden Manor =

Manor house in Kingston upon Thames, London, England

Coordinates: 51.3819°N 0.2612°W

Malden Manor is an area located in southwest London, England. It has a railway station, a number of shops, apartments, and a local park with gym facilities (Manor park).

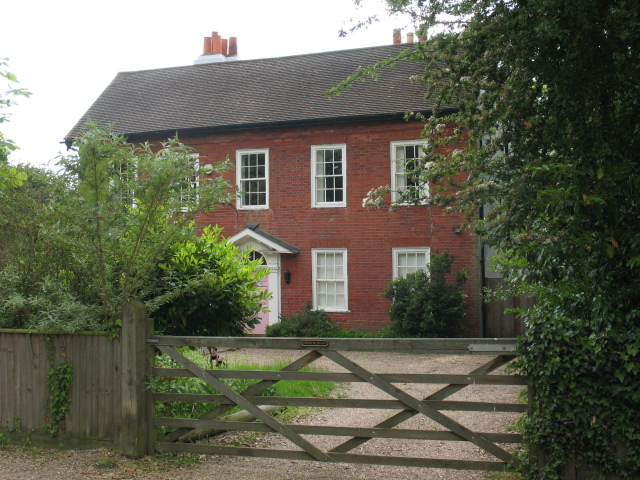
Malden Manor

Malden Manor is a grade II listed manor house located in the Old Malden area in the London Borough of Kingston, England.

The Manor House, next to St John's church, is mentioned in the Domesday Book. In 1264, Walter de Merton, Bishop of Rochester, founded a college here that was later moved to Oxford as Merton College. The house was later used as a court in the reign of Henry VIII, and in the mid 18th century the house was the home of Captain Cook. In 1852, the Hogsmill River was the setting for the background of Ophelia painted by John Everett Millais.

Malden Manor railway station is nearby.
