= Connor Smith (footballer, born 1993) =

Irish footballer (born 1993)

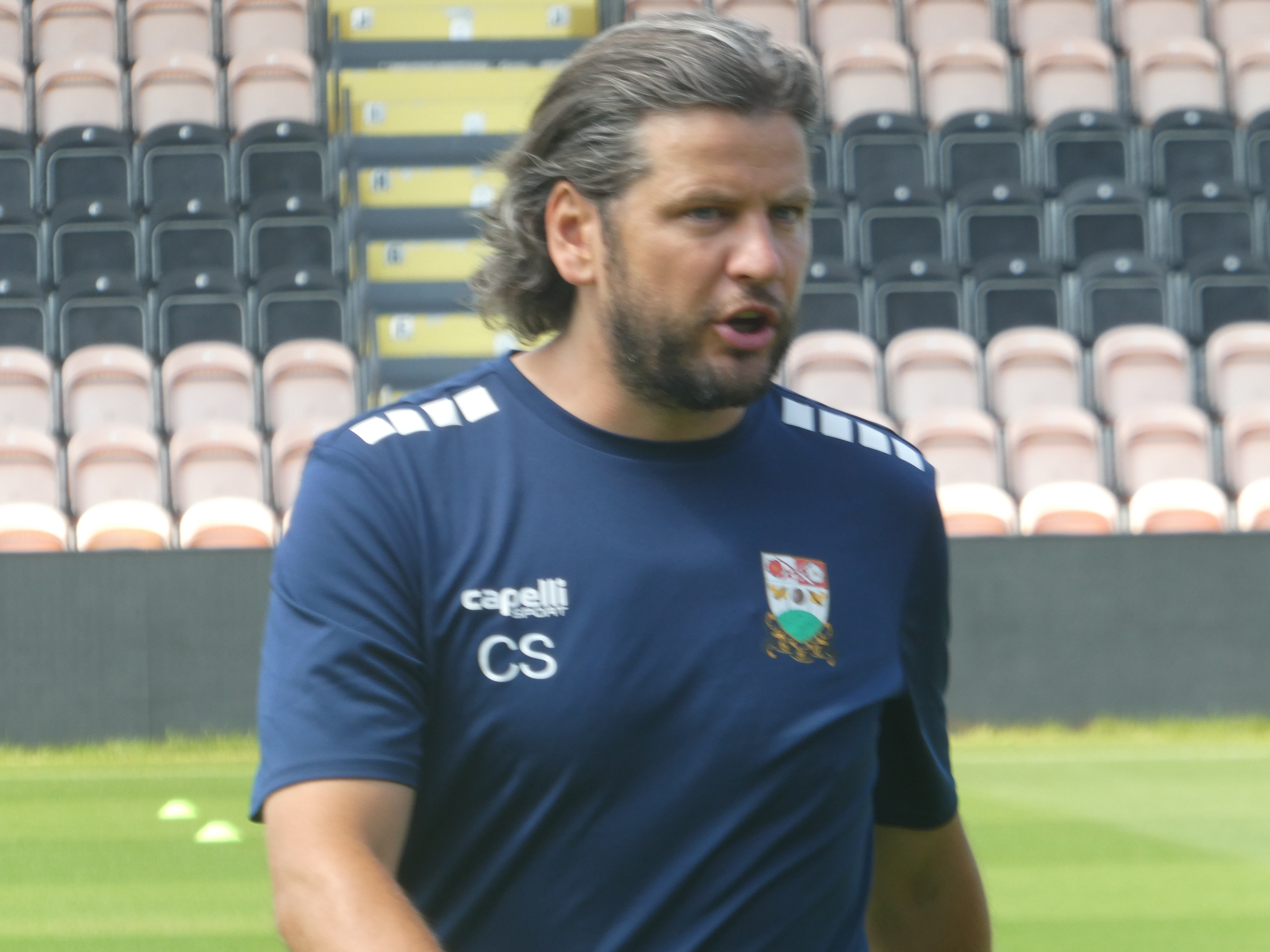
- Smith in 2026

Personal information
- Full name: Connor Michael Smith
- Date of birth: 18 February 1993 (age 33)
- Place of birth: Mullingar, Ireland
- Position: Midfielder

Team information
- Current team: Barnet (assistant manager)

Youth career
- –2010: Mullingar Athletic
- 2010–2011: Watford

Senior career*
Years	Team	Apps	(Gls)
2011–2016	Watford	8	(0)
2011–2012	→ Wealdstone (loan)	22	(3)
2014	→ Gillingham (loan)	10	(0)
2015	→ Stevenage (loan)	4	(0)
2016	AFC Wimbledon	10	(0)
2016–2017	Plymouth Argyle	25	(1)
2017–2018	Yeovil Town	19	(0)
2018–2019	Boreham Wood	9	(0)
2019	Billericay Town	5	(1)
2019	→ Kingstonian (loan)	4	(1)
2019	→ Kings Langley (loan)	8	(0)
2019–2021	Wealdstone	51	(2)
2021–2022	Boreham Wood	14	(0)
2022–2023	Barnet	7	(0)
Total		196	(8)

International career^{‡}
2009	Republic of Ireland U17		
2011–2012	Republic of Ireland U19	6	(1)
2013–2014	Republic of Ireland U21	4	(0)
- * Club domestic league appearances and goals as of 18:58, 31 October 2025 (UTC) ‡ National team caps and goals as of 13:20, 8 September 2015 (UTC)

Connor Michael Smith (born 18 February 1993) is an Irish former footballer who played as a midfielder. He is currently assistant coach of EFL League Two club Barnet.

== Career ==
Born in Ireland, Smith came to prominence in 2010, finishing as runner-up to Ben Greenhalgh on the television show Football's Next Star. He joined the academy setup at Watford later that year in May, signing a two-year apprenticeship.

In November 2011, Smith joined Isthmian League side Wealdstone on loan until January 2012, along with Britt Assombalonga. In January, the loan was extended for a further two months after the club had remained unbeaten.

Smith signed his first professional contract with Watford in May 2012. His professional debut for Watford came on 18 August 2012, in a 3–2 victory over Crystal Palace in the Football League Championship, replacing Sean Murray as a substitute. On 8 January 2014, Smith signed on loan for Gillingham until the end of the 2013–14 season.

On 1 September 2015, Smith signed for League Two side Stevenage on an initial month loan. Smith left Watford on 21 January 2016 after his contract was cancelled by mutual consent. The next day Smith signed a permanent contract with AFC Wimbledon. Despite only playing 11 games for the Dons, Smith joined Plymouth Argyle. He scored his first goal for Plymouth in an EFL Trophy tie against former club AFC Wimbledon on 4 October 2016.

Having helped Plymouth Argyle to achieve promotion to League One, Smith was released at the end of the 2016–17 season. Following his release by Plymouth, Smith signed for League Two side Yeovil Town on a two-year contract. On 5 July 2018, Smith's contract with Yeovil Town was terminated by mutual consent.

On 6 July 2018, Smith signed for National League side Boreham Wood.

On 4 January 2019, Smith signed for Billericay Town on an 18-month contract.

Smith then signed for Wealdstone for a second time ahead of the 2019–2020 season. Smith was part of the Wealdstone side who won promotion to the National League in 2019-20. Smith's first goal in his second stint at the Stones came on 2 March 2021, against his former side Boreham Wood in a 1–0 victory. On 4 June 2021 it was announced that Smith had left the club.

In June 2021, Smith returned to Boreham Wood to take on a player/first team coach role. On 12 July 2022, Smith signed for Barnet on a two-year contract.

== Coaching career ==
In June 2023, following the departure of John Dreyer, Smith was promoted to assistant manager at Barnet. In October 2025, he signed a new two-and-a-half year contract.

== Career statistics ==
Appearances and goals by club, season and competition
Club	Season	League			FA Cup		League Cup		Other		Total	
Club	Season	Division	Apps	Goals	Apps	Goals	Apps	Goals	Apps	Goals	Apps	Goals
Watford	2011–12	Championship	0	0	0	0	0	0	—		0	0
Watford	2012–13	Championship	7	0	0	0	0	0	—		7	0
Watford	2013–14	Championship	1	0	1	0	3	0	—		5	0
Watford	2014–15	Championship	0	0	0	0	0	0	0	0	0	0
Watford	2015–16	Premier League	0	0	0	0	1	0	—		1	0
Watford	Total		8	0	1	0	4	0	0	0	13	0
Wealdstone (loan)	2011–12	IL Premier Division	22	3	—		—		10 (Note: Seven appearances in FA Trophy, two appearances and two goals in Middlesex Senior Cup, one appearance in Isthmian League Premier Division play-offs)	2	32	5
Gillingham (loan)	2013–14	League One	10	0	—		—		—		10	0
Stevenage (loan)	2015–16	League Two	4	0	—		—		—		4	0
AFC Wimbledon	2015–16	League Two	10	0	—		—		1 (Note: Appearance in League Two play-offs)	0	11	0
Plymouth Argyle	2016–17	League Two	25	1	3	0	1	0	2 (Note: Appearances in EFL Trophy)	1	31	2
Yeovil Town	2017–18	League Two	19	0	3	0	1	0	5	1	28	1
Boreham Wood	2018–19	National League	9	0	1	0	—		1 (Note: Appearance in Scottish Challenge Cup)	0	11	0
Billericay Town	2018–19	National League South	5	1	—		—		1 (Note: Appearance in Essex Senior Cup)	0	6	1
Kingstonian (loan)	2018–19	IL Premier Division	4	1	—		—		—		4	1
Kings Langley (loan)	2018–19	SL Premier Division South	8	0	—		—		—		8	0
Wealdstone	2019–20	National League South	19	0	5	0	—		2 (Note: One appearance in FA Trophy, one appearance in Middlesex Senior Cup)	0	26	0
Wealdstone	2020–21	National League	32	2	1	0	—		3 (Note: Appearances in FA Trophy)	0	36	2
Wealdstone	Total		51	2	6	0	—		5	0	62	2
Boreham Wood	2021–22	National League	14	0	1	0	—		0	0	15	0
Barnet	2022–23	National League	7	0	0	0	—		1 (Note: Appearances in Middlesex Senior Cup)	0	8	0
Career total			196	7	15	0	6	0	25	4	242	12

== Honours ==
AFC Wimbledon

- Football League Two play-offs: 2016

Wealdstone

- National League South: 2019-20
