= 2014–15 Swindon Town F.C. season =

Swindon Town
2014–15 season
- Chairman: Lee Power
- Manager: Mark Cooper
- Ground: County Ground
- League One: 4th
- FA Cup: First round (Knocked out by Cheltenham Town)
- League Cup: Second round (Knocked out by Brighton & Hove Albion)
- League Trophy: 2nd Round (South) (Knocked out by Plymouth Argyle)
- Top goalscorer: League: Andy Williams (21); All: Andy Williams
Home colours	Away colours	Third colours

The 2014–15 season was Swindon Town's third consecutive season in the League One since gaining promotion from League Two in 2012. Alongside the league campaign, Swindon Town also competed in the FA Cup, League Cup and the Football League Trophy.

== Chronological list of events ==
=== April (2014) ===
- 17 April 2014: Jose Antonio wins the annual Samsung Win a Pro Contract competition. The one-year deal is scheduled to begin in the Summer of 2014.
- 26 April 2014: Youth graduates Matty Jones and Curtis Da Costa are offered professional contracts.
- 28 April 2014: Local press in Gloucestershire link Swindon to Forest Green Rovers and England C defender, Jamie Turley.

=== May (2014) ===
- 3 May 2014: It is announced that senior players Dany N'Guessan, Alex Smith, Lee Cox, Jay McEveley and Paul Benson will not be offered new contracts.
- 3 May 2014: Development players Aaron Oakley, Kayden Jackson, Leigh Bedwell, Mark Francis and Alex Ferguson are also released by the club.
- 7 May 2014: Miles Storey is reported to have attracted interest from fellow League One side Notts County and League Two sides Shrewsbury Town and Portsmouth.
- 14 May 2014: Australia Head Coach Ange Postecoglou names Town midfielder Massimo Luongo within his 30-man provisional squad ahead of the 2014 FIFA World Cup Finals in Brazil.
- 16 May 2014: A scheduled courtroom hearing between lawyers representing club owners Swinton Reds Ltd and the previous owners Seebeck 87 Ltd is postponed.
- 22 May 2014: It is announced that Swindon Town's sponsorship deal with Samsung has ended after three seasons.
- 27 May 2014: Massimo Luongo survives the first cut as the Australia squad for the World Cup is reduced from 30 to 27 players.
- 28 May 2014: It is belatedly reported that Swindon Town had been interested in signing ex-England defender Nicky Shorey before he signed a new deal with Portsmouth.
- 30 May 2014: The club release a statement announcing that the ownership dispute between Swinton Reds Ltd and Seebeck 87 Ltd will be decided in the High Court on 26 June 2014.

=== June ===
- 3 June 2014: Massimo Luongo is named in the final 23-man Australia squad for the 2014 FIFA World Cup. Luongo becomes the first footballer since Jan Åge Fjørtoft in 1994 to represent Swindon Town at the World Cup Finals.
- 13 June 2014: It is confirmed that Jack Barthram and Connor Waldon have signed contract extensions and will remain with the club.
- 14 June 2014: Reports suggest that out-of-contract Town defender Troy Archibald-Henville has been offered to other clubs by his representatives while contract negotiations continue.
- 17 June 2014: The Swindon Advertiser report that Swindon Town are close to agreeing a new three-year sponsorship deal worth around £250,000 with locally based company, Imagine Cruising.
- 19 June 2014: Imagine Cruising are officially announced as the club's new kit sponsor.
- 24 June 2014: Portsmouth are reported to be on the brink of signing young Town forward Miles Storey on loan until the end of the 2014/15 season.
- 25 June 2014: High Court proceedings to determine the ownership of Swindon Town F.C. begins.
- 26 June 2014: The second day of High Court proceedings closes with Judge Nicholas Strauss QC unable to reach a verdict.
- 26 June 2014: The Swindon Advertiser report that Tyrell Belford has been made available for loan.
- 27 June 2014: Steve Hale is appointed Head of Goalkeeping.

=== July ===
- 1 July 2014: Swindon Town's ownership battle has been settled after a High Court Judge Nicholas Strauss QC ruled that chairman Lee Power's takeover was carried out properly while former owner Jed McCrory is ordered to pay legal costs likely to total over £50,000. Lee Power reacts to the decision by calling the former owners, 'rogues'.
- 3 July 2014: Swindon Town chairman Lee Power writes an open letter apologising for the recent trials and tribulations that the club had experienced.
- 8 July 2014: Chairman Lee Power confirms during a BBC Radio Wiltshire phone-in that Swindon Town are looking to bring Southampton defender Jack Stephens back to Wiltshire.
- 9 July 2014: Town defender Nathan Thompson is linked as a possible transfer target for fellow League One side Peterborough United.
- 11 July 2014: Manager Mark Cooper admits that Darren Ward and midfielder Ryan Harley are not in his future plans.
- 14 July 2014: It is reported that young Liverpool left-back Brad Smith is a loan transfer target for Swindon Town.
- 15 July 2014: The BBC report that Swindon have rejected a £600,000 bid from Rotherham United for Massimo Luongo.
- 15 July 2014: Scott Lindsey is appointed the new manager of the Under-18's side.
- 16 July 2014: A tentative £200,000 bid by Peterborough United for Town captain Nathan Thompson is rejected.
- 16 July 2014: Ibrahim Kargbo is banned indefinitely by the Sierra Leone Football Association for alleged match-fixing just days after completing an unsuccessful trial spell with Swindon Town.
- 30 July 2014: Swindon Town are reported to be hoping to conclude a loan deal for Southampton defender Jordan Turnbull.

=== August ===
- 7 August 2014: Nathan Thompson is confirmed as the new club captain.
- 7 August 2014: BBC Wiltshire report that Swindon Town have had a bid rejected for Östersunds FK centre forward Modou Barrow.
- 11 August 2014: Reported interest from Coventry City for Town forward Michael Smith is debunked by Sky Blues manager Steven Pressley.
- 14 August 2014: Brad Smith returns to Liverpool for assessment after suffering a grade one medial strain.
- 18 August 2014: Mark Cooper concedes that Swindon Town may not be able to re-sign Southampton's Jack Stephens on loan after the young defender was named on the bench for the Saints' first Premier League game at Liverpool.
- 20 August 2014: Gillingham manager Peter Taylor bemoans Town manager Mark Coopers' celebrations after Stephen Bywater's late own goal in the 2–2 draw.
- 21 August 2014: Massimo Luongo and Brad Smith are called up by Australia for their friendlies against Belgium and Saudi Arabia.

=== September ===
- 4 September 2014: Massimo Luongo earns his second cap for Australia in the Socceroos' 2–0 loss to Belgium.
- 8 September 2014: Brad Smith makes his Australia debut while Massimo Luongo impresses in the Socceroos' 3–2 win over Saudi Arabia at Craven Cottage.
- 17 September 2014: The club dismiss tabloid links to ex-Manchester United and Burnley midfielder, Chris Eagles.
- 30 September 2014: Swindon Town are reported to be interested in Norwich City forward Jamar Loza as cover for the injured Jonathan Obika.

=== December ===
- 5 December 2014: Mark Cooper is named the Football League One Manager of the Month for November 2014.

=== January ===
- 31 January 2015: Massimo Luongo scores the first goal in Australia's triumph over South Korea in the final of the 2015 AFC Asian Cup.

=== May (2015) ===
- 7 May 2015: Swindon Town played Sheffield United in the first leg of their League One playoff semi-final. They won the game 2–1 with goals from Sam Ricketts and Nathan Byrne for Swindon Town.
- 11 May 2015: Swindon Town played Sheffield United in the second leg of their League One playoff semi-final. The game ended 5–5 with goals from Ben Gladwin (2), Michael Smith (2) and Jonathan Obika to progress to the playoff final 7–6 on aggregate. They lost to Preston North End at Wembley Stadium on 24 May 2015 for promotion to the Football League Championship.

== Sponsors ==
On 22 May 2014, it was announced that South Korean multinational conglomerate company Samsung will no longer serve as Swindon Town's main shirt sponsors for the 2014/15 season, thus ending a three-year relationship with the firm. It was officially announced on 19 July 2014 that the Swindon based luxury holiday company, Imagine Cruising, would be the club's new home shirt sponsor for the 2014/15 season with local communications firm Excalibur acting as a secondary sponsor. C&D Recruitment were later confirmed as the club's away shirt sponsor.

Supplier: Adidas
Sponsor(s): Imagine Cruising (Home), C&D Recruitment (Away).

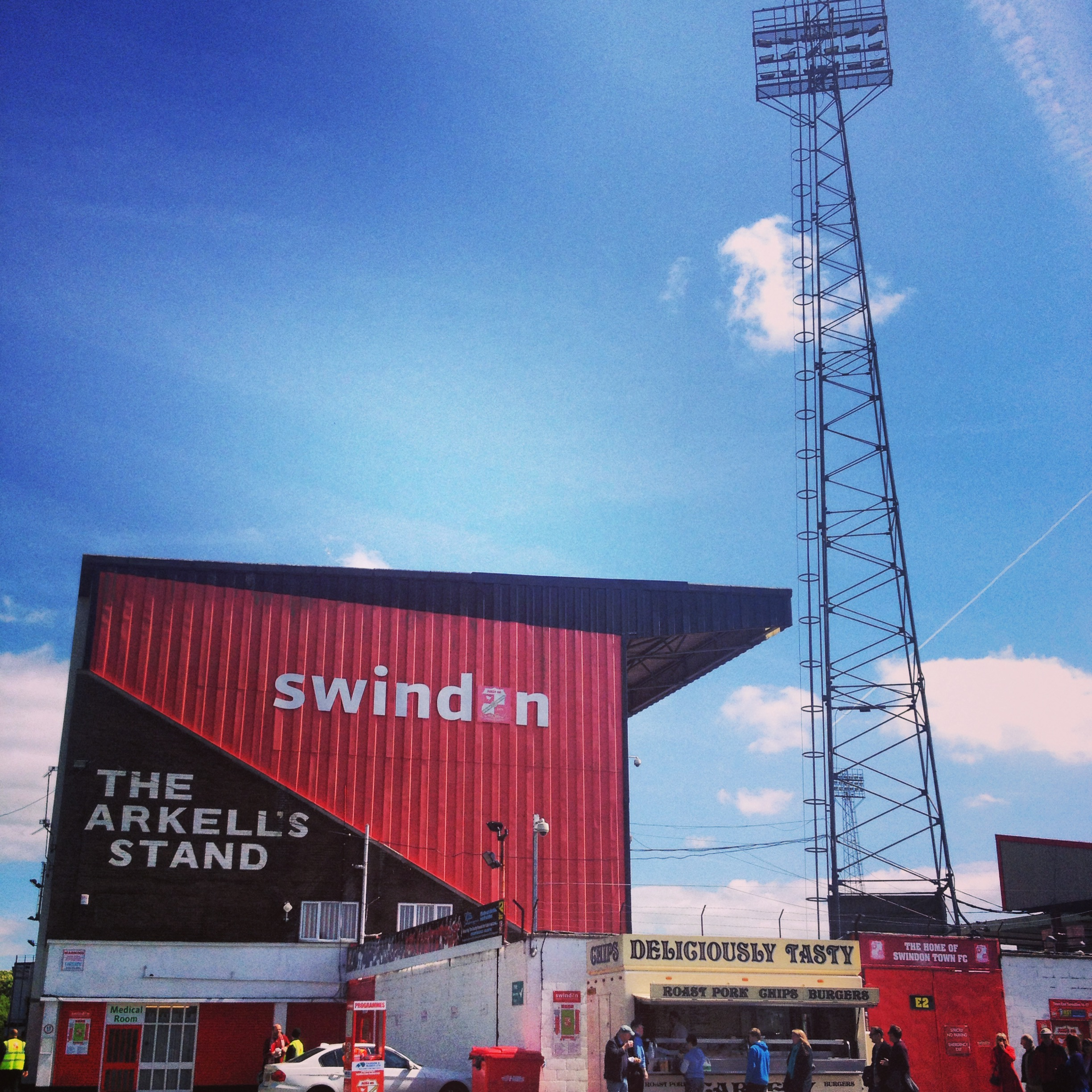
The County Ground, Swindon

=== Season squad ===
Note: Flags indicate national team as defined under FIFA eligibility rules; some limited exceptions apply. Players may hold more than one non-FIFA nationality.

No.	Pos.	Nation	Player
1	GK	ENG	Wes Foderingham
2	DF	ENG	Nathan Thompson (captain)
3	DF	ENG	Nathan Byrne
4	MF	AUS	Massimo Luongo
5	DF	ENG	Jack Stephens (on loan from Southampton)
6	DF	ENG	Jordan Turnbull (on loan from Southampton)
7	MF	ENG	Ben Gladwin
8	MF	IRQ	Yaser Kasim
9	FW	ENG	Michael Smith
10	FW	ENG	Andy Williams
11	DF	AUS	Brad Smith (on loan from Liverpool)
12	DF	ENG	Amari'i Bell (on loan from Birmingham City)
14	MF	ENG	Jake Reeves
14	MF	ENG	John Swift (on loan from Chelsea)
15	DF	ENG	Josh Lelan (on loan from Derby County)
15	DF	ENG	Harry Toffolo (on loan from Norwich City)
16	FW	ENG	Connor Waldon
17	MF	ENG	Ryan Harley
18	FW	ENG	George Barker
19	MF	WAL	Louis Thompson (on loan from Norwich City)

No.	Pos.	Nation	Player
20	FW	ENG	Jonathan Obika
22	DF	ENG	Darren Ward
23	DF	ENG	Jack Barthram
24	DF	ENG	Curtis Da Costa
24	FW	ENG	Jermaine Hylton
25	GK	ENG	Tyrell Belford
26	MF	IRL	Anton Rodgers
27	DF	ENG	Josue Antonio
28	MF	ENG	Tom Smith
29	DF	BRA	Raphael Rossi Branco
30	MF	ENG	Harry Agombar
31	FW	ENG	Will Randall
32	MF	ENG	Lee Marshall
33	DF	ENG	Tom Holland
34	MF	ENG	Tom Ouldridge
35	GK	ENG	Connor Johns
36	DF	WAL	Sam Ricketts (on loan from Wolverhampton Wanderers)
37	GK	ENG	Cameron Belford
38	FW	ENG	Josh Cooke
39	DF	ENG	Ryan Wood

== Transfers ==
As of 21 March 2015

Players transferred in
No.	Date	Pos.	Name	From	Fee	Ref.
1	17 April 2014	DF	(England) Antonio Josue	(England) Staines Town	Competition Winner	
2	17 July 2014	MF	(Republic of Ireland) Anton Rodgers	(England) Oldham Athletic	Free	
3	29 August 2014	MF	(England) Jake Reeves	(England) Brentford	Free	
4	1 September 2014	FW	(England) Jonathan Obika	(England) Tottenham Hotspur	Undisclosed	
5	8 January 2015	FW	(England) Jermaine Hylton	(England) Redditch United	Free	
6	27 March 2015	GK	(England) Cameron Belford	(England) Rushall Olympic	Free	
Players transferred out
No.	Date	Pos.	Name	To	Fee	Ref.
1	1 July 2014	DF	(England) Troy Archibald-Henville	(England) Carlisle United	Released	
2	1 July 2014	GK	(England) Leigh Bedwell	(England) Banbury United	Released	
3	1 July 2014	FW	(England) Paul Benson	(England) Luton Town	Released	
4	1 July 2014	MF	(England) Lee Cox	(England) Plymouth Argyle	Released	
5	1 July 2014	MF	(England) Alex Ferguson	(England) Chippenham Town	Released	
6	1 July 2014	FW	(England) Mark Francis	(England) Frome Town	Released	
7	1 July 2014	FW	(England) Kayden Jackson	(England) Tamworth	Released	
8	1 July 2014	DF	(Scotland) Jay McEveley	(England) Sheffield United	Released	
9	1 July 2014	MF	(England) Alan Navarro	Free Agent	Retired	
10	1 July 2014	MF	(France) Dany N'Guessan	(England) Port Vale	Released	
11	1 July 2014	DF	(Wales) Aaron Oakley	(England) Frome Town	Released	
12	1 July 2014	DF	(England) Alex Smith	(England) Yeovil Town	Released	
13	28 August 2014	MF	(Portugal) Tijane Reis	Free Agent	Mutual Consent	
14	1 September 2014	MF	(Wales) Louis Thompson	(England) Norwich City	Undisclosed	
15	7 January 2015	MF	(England) Jake Reeves	(England) AFC Wimbledon	Free	
16	12 January 2015	MF	(England) Ryan Harley	(England) Exeter City	Free	
17	12 January 2015	DF	(England) Curtis Da Costa	(England) Gosport Borough	Released	
Players loaned in
No.	Date from	Pos.	Name	From	Date to	Ref.
1	23 July 2014	DF	(England) Josh Lelan	(England) Derby County	29 September 2014	
2	7 August 2014	DF	(England) Brad Smith	(England) Liverpool	20 October 2014	
3	8 August 2014	DF	(England) Jordan Turnbull	(England) Southampton	30 June 2015	
4	1 September 2014	DF	(England) Jack Stephens	(England) Southampton	30 June 2015	
5	1 September 2014	MF	(Wales) Louis Thompson	(England) Norwich City	May 2014	
6	26 September 2014	DF	(England) Amari'i Bell	(England) Birmingham City	3 January 2014	
7	20 October 2014	DF	(England) Harry Toffolo	(England) Norwich City	30 June 2015	
8	3 January 2015	MF	(England) John Swift	(England) Chelsea	30 June 2015	
9	21 March 2015	DF	(Wales) Sam Ricketts	(England) Wolverhampton Wanderers	30 June 2015	
Players loaned out
No.	Date from	Pos.	Name	To	Date to	Ref.
1	10 July 2014	FW	(England) Miles Storey	(England) Portsmouth	31 May 2015	
2	8 August 2014	DF	(England) Curtis Da Costa	(England) Wantage Town	8 September 2014	
3	8 August 2014	DF	(England) Matty Jones	(England) Wantage Town	8 September 2014	
4	16 August 2014	DF	(England) Josue Antonio	(England) Swindon Supermarine	16 September 2014	
5	9 September 2014	DF	(England) Matty Jones	(England) Chippenham Town	2014	
6	10 September 2014	MF	(England) Harry Agombar	(England) Hereford United	2014	
7	23 September 2014	DF	(England) Curtis Da Costa	(England) Bognor Regis Town	2014	
8	10 October 2014	FW	(England) George Barker	(England) Tranmere Rovers	3 November 2014	
9	20 November 2014	MF	(England) Ryan Harley	(England) Exeter City	1 January 2015	
10	9 January 2015	DF	(England) Darren Ward	(England) Crawley Town	30 June 2015	
11	30 January 2015	FW	(England) Miles Storey	(Wales) Newport County	2 March 2015	

=== Trial players ===
Nat.	Player	Signed	Ref
(England)	Elikem Amenku	✗	
(England)	Calvin-Prince 'Kalinga' Abdillah	✗	
(England)	Cameron Belford	✓	
(Australia)	Joel Chianese	✗	
(Sierra Leone)	Ibrahim Kargbo	✗	
(Democratic Republic of the Congo)	Khalil Lambin	✗	
(England)	Matt Marshall	✗	
(Republic of Ireland)	Anton Rodgers	✓	
(England)	Devante Romeo	✗	
(England)	Aaron Sekhon	✗	
(Northern Ireland)	Jamie Sendles-White	✗	
(England)	Curtis Tilt	✗	
(Belgium)	Jonathan Vandesompele	✗	

=== Work experience ===
Nat.	Player	Signed	Ref
(England)	Jordan Turnbull	✓	Season loan

== Squad statistics ==
As of 25 May 2015

=== Appearances and goals ===
League One data includes play-off information

No.	Pos	Nat	Player	Total		League One		FA Cup		League Cup		JP Trophy	
No.	Pos	Nat	Player	Apps	Goals	Apps	Goals	Apps	Goals	Apps	Goals	Apps	Goals
1	GK	(England) ENG	Wes Foderingham	50	0	47+0	0	1+0	0	2+0	0	0+0	0
2	DF	(England) ENG	Nathan Thompson	43	0	38+0	0	1+0	0	2+0	0	2+0	0
3	DF	(England) ENG	Nathan Byrne	49	4	45+0	4	1+0	0	2+0	0	1+0	0
4	MF	(Australia) AUS	Massimo Luongo	40	6	36+1	6	1+0	0	2+0	0	0+0	0
5	DF	(England) ENG	Jack Stephens (on loan from Southampton)	42	1	39+1	1	1+0	0	0+0	0	1+0	0
6	DF	(England) ENG	Jordan Turnbull (on loan from Southampton)	52	1	47+0	1	1+0	0	2+0	0	2+0	0
7	MF	(England) ENG	Ben Gladwin	41	11	31+6	10	0+1	0	2+0	0	0+1	1
8	MF	(Iraq) IRQ	Yaser Kasim	41	3	31+7	2	1+0	0	2+0	1	0+0	0
9	FW	(England) ENG	Michael Smith	47	18	35+8	15	0+1	0	2+0	2	0+1	1
10	FW	(England) ENG	Andy Williams	53	22	28+20	21	1+0	0	1+1	0	2+0	1
14	MF	(England) ENG	John Swift (on loan from Chelsea)	19	2	12+7	2	0+0	0	0+0	0	0+0	0
15	DF	(England) ENG	Harry Toffolo (on loan from Norwich City)	30	1	23+6	1	1+0	0	0+0	0	0+0	0
16	FW	(England) ENG	Connor Waldon	4	0	1+0	0	0+0	0	0+1	0	1+1	0
18	FW	(England) ENG	George Barker	8	0	1+4	0	0+0	0	0+1	0	0+2	0
19	MF	(Wales) WAL	Louis Thompson (on loan from Norwich City)	38	3	30+3	2	1+0	0	2+0	1	2+0	0
20	FW	(England) ENG	Jonathan Obika	38	10	22+14	9	1+0	0	0+0	0	1+0	1
21	DF	(England) ENG	Matty Jones	0	0	0+0	0	0+0	0	0+0	0	0+0	0
22	DF	(England) ENG	Darren Ward (on loan at Crawley Town)	0	0	0+0	0	0+0	0	0+0	0	0+0	0
23	DF	(England) ENG	Jack Barthram	8	0	3+2	0	0+0	0	0+1	0	2+0	0
24	FW	(England) ENG	Jermaine Hylton	13	1	3+10	1	0+0	0	0+0	0	0+0	0
25	GK	(England) ENG	Tyrell Belford	4	0	2+0	0	0+0	0	0+0	0	2+0	0
26	MF	(Republic of Ireland) IRL	Anton Rodgers	13	2	7+4	2	0+0	0	0+0	0	1+1	0
27	DF	(England) ENG	Josue Antonio	0	0	0+0	0	0+0	0	0+0	0	0+0	0
28	MF	(England) ENG	Tom Smith	1	0	0+1	0	0+0	0	0+0	0	0+0	0
29	DF	(Brazil) BRA	Raphael Rossi Branco	33	3	26+4	3	0+1	0	2+0	0	0+0	0
30	MF	(England) ENG	Harry Agombar	1	0	1+0	0	0+0	0	0+0	0	0+0	0
31	FW	(England) ENG	Will Randall	4	0	2+2	0	0+0	0	0+0	0	0+0	0
32	MF	(England) ENG	Lee Marshall	3	0	1+1	0	0+0	0	0+1	0	0+0	0
33	DF	(England) ENG	Tom Holland	0	0	0+0	0	0+0	0	0+0	0	0+0	0
34	MF	(England) ENG	Tom Ouldridge	0	0	0+0	0	0+0	0	0+0	0	0+0	0
35	GK	(England) ENG	Connor Johns	0	0	0+0	0	0+0	0	0+0	0	0+0	0
36	DF	(Wales) WAL	Sam Ricketts (on loan from Wolverhampton Wanderers)	12	1	10+2	1	0+0	0	0+0	0	0+0	0
37	GK	(England) ENG	Cameron Belford	1	0	0+1	0	0+0	0	0+0	0	0+0	0
38	FW	(England) ENG	Josh Cooke	2	0	1+1	0	0+0	0	0+0	0	0+0	0
39	DF	(England) ENG	Ryan Wood	0	0	0+0	0	0+0	0	0+0	0	0+0	0
	FW	(England) ENG	Miles Storey	0	0	0+0	0	0+0	0	0+0	0	0+0	0
Players who were contracted to Swindon Town but have since departed on a permanent basis:
11	DF	(Australia) AUS	Brad Smith (on loan from Liverpool)	10	0	7+0	0	0+0	0	2+0	0	1+0	0
12	DF	(England) ENG	Amari'i Bell (on loan from Birmingham City)	11	0	7+3	0	0+0	0	0+0	0	1+0	0
14	MF	(England) ENG	Jake Reeves	12	1	1+9	1	0+0	0	0+0	0	2+0	0
15	DF	(England) ENG	Josh Lelan (on loan from Derby County)	5	0	2+2	0	0+0	0	0+0	0	1+0	0
17	MF	(England) ENG	Ryan Harley	0	0	0+0	0	0+0	0	0+0	0	0+0	0
24	DF	(England) ENG	Curtis Da Costa	0	0	0+0	0	0+0	0	0+0	0	0+0	0
	MF	(Portugal) POR	Tijane Reis	0	0	0+0	0	0+0	0	0+0	0	0+0	0

=== Goalscorers ===
Name	League	FA Cup	League Cup	JP Trophy	Total
Andy Williams	21	0	0	1	22
Michael Smith	15	0	2	1	18
Ben Gladwin	10	0	0	1	11
Jonathan Obika	9	0	0	1	10
Massimo Luongo	6	0	0	0	6
Nathan Byrne	4	0	0	0	4
Louis Thompson	2	0	1	0	3
Yaser Kasim	2	0	1	0	3
Raphael Rossi Branco	3	0	0	0	3
Anton Rodgers	2	0	0	0	2
John Swift	2	0	0	0	1
Jermaine Hylton	1	0	0	0	1
Jake Reeves	1	0	0	0	1
Sam Ricketts	1	0	0	0	1
Jack Stephens	1	0	0	0	1
John Swift	1	0	0	0	1
Jordan Turnbull	1	0	0	0	1
Own Goals	1	0	0	0	1
Total	83	0	4	4	91

=== Clean sheets ===
Includes all competitive matches.

R	No.	Pos	Nat	Name	League One	FA Cup	League Cup	JP Trophy	Total
1	1	GK	(England)	Wes Foderingham	14	0	0	0	14
				TOTALS	14	0	0	0	14

=== Disciplinary ===
Name	League One		FA Cup		League Cup		JP Trophy		Total	
Name	Yellow card	Red card	Yellow card	Red card	Yellow card	Red card	Yellow card	Red card	Yellow card	Red card
Yaser Kasim	11	0	0	0	2	0	0	0	13	0
Jordan Turnbull	10	0	0	0	1	0	0	0	11	0
Raphael Rossi Branco	11	0	0	0	0	0	0	0	11	0
Nathan Thompson	8	1	0	0	2	1	1	0	10	2
Nathan Byrne	5	0	0	0	0	0	0	0	5	0
Massimo Luongo	5	0	0	0	0	0	0	0	5	0
Jack Stephens	5	1	0	0	0	0	0	0	5	1
Louis Thompson	4	1	0	0	1	0	0	0	5	1
Harry Toffolo	4	0	0	0	0	0	0	0	4	0
Michael Smith	3	0	0	0	0	0	0	0	3	0
Wes Foderingham	2	0	0	0	0	0	0	0	2	0
Ben Gladwin	2	0	0	0	0	0	0	0	2	0
Jermaine Hylton	2	0	0	0	0	0	0	0	2	0
Anton Rodgers	1	0	0	0	0	0	1	0	2	0
John Swift	2	0	0	0	0	0	0	0	2	0
Andy Williams	2	0	0	0	0	0	0	0	2	0
Jake Reeves	1	0	0	0	0	0	0	0	1	0
Jack Barthram	1	0	0	0	0	0	0	0	1	0
Jonathan Obika	1	0	0	0	0	0	0	0	1	0
Sam Ricketts	1	0	0	0	0	0	0	0	1	0
Tyrell Belford	0	1	0	0	0	0	1	0	1	1
Total	81	4	0	0	6	1	3	0	90	5

=== Awards ===
Date	Player	Award	Ref
2014–15	(England) Jordan Turnbull	Swindon Town Player of the Season	
2014–15	(England) Nathan Byrne	PFA League One Team of the Year	
2014–15	(Australia) Massimo Luongo	PFA League One Team of the Year	

== Overall summary ==
=== Score overview ===
Opposition	Home score	Away score	Double
Barnsley	2–0	3–0	Yes
Bradford City	2–1	2–1	Yes
Bristol City	1–0	0–3	No
Chesterfield	3–1	3–0	Yes
Colchester United	2–2	1–1	No
Coventry City	1–1	3–0	No
Crawley Town	1–2	0–1	No
Crewe Alexandra	2–0	0–0	No
Doncaster Rovers	0–1	2–1	No
Fleetwood Town	1–0	2–2	No
Gillingham	0–3	2–2	No
Leyton Orient	2–2	2–1	No
Milton Keynes Dons	0–3	1–2	No
Notts County	3–0	3–0	Yes
Oldham Athletic	2–2	1–2	No
Peterborough United	1–0	2–1	Yes
Port Vale	1–0	1–0	Yes
Preston North End	1–0	0–3	No
Rochdale	2–3	4–2	No
Scunthorpe United	3–1	1–3	No
Sheffield United	5–2	0–2	No
Walsall	3–3	4–1	No
Yeovil Town	0–1	1–1	No

=== League table ===
Pos	Team	Pld	W	D	L	GF	GA	GD	Pts	Promotion, qualification or relegation
2	Milton Keynes Dons (P)	46	27	10	9	101	44	+57	91	Promotion to Football League Championship
3	Preston North End (O, P)	46	25	14	7	79	40	+39	89	Qualification for League One play-offs (Note: Four teams play for one spot and promotion to Football League Championship.)
4	Swindon Town	46	23	10	13	76	57	+19	79	Qualification for League One play-offs
5	Sheffield United	46	19	14	13	66	53	+13	71	Qualification for League One play-offs
6	Chesterfield	46	19	12	15	68	55	+13	69	Qualification for League One play-offs

Updated to match(es) played on 3 May 2015. Source: BBC Sport
Rules for classification: 1) Points; 2) Goal difference; 3) Number of goals scored
(O) Play-off winners; (P) Promoted

=== Result summary ===
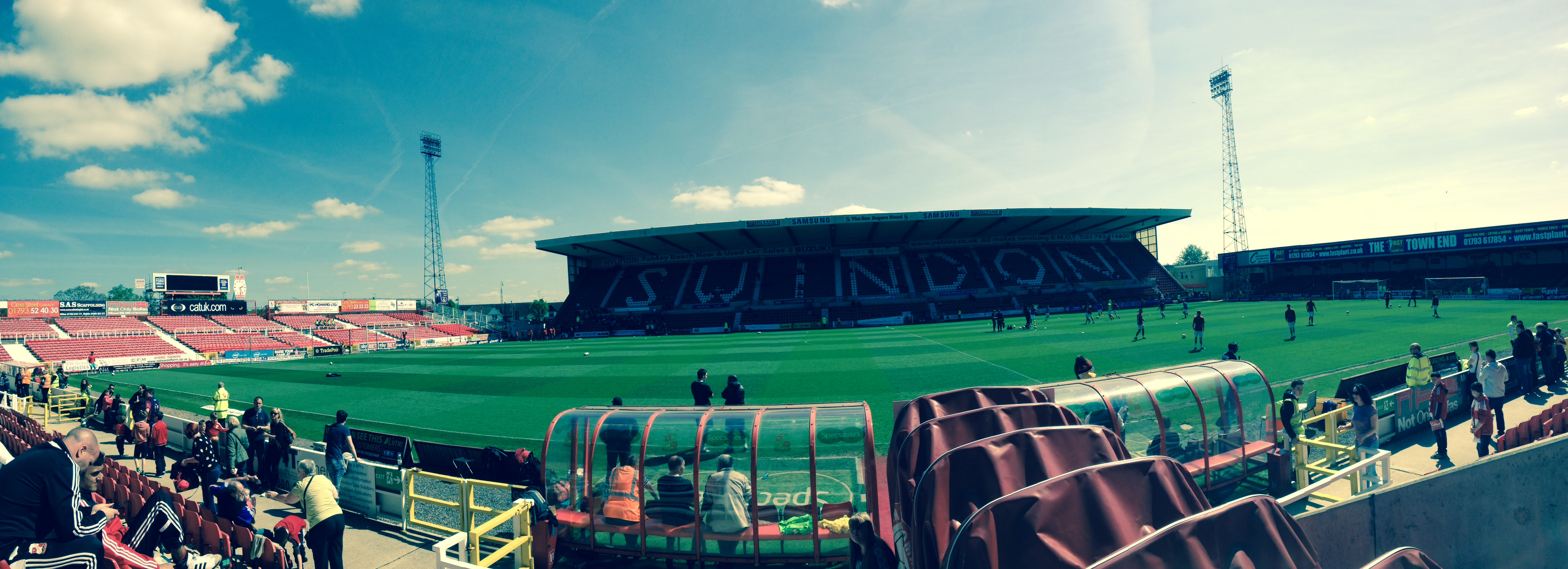
Inside the County Ground

Round	1	2	3	4	5	6	7	8	9	10	11	12	13	14	15	16	17	18	19	20	21	22	23	24	25	26	27	28	29	30	31	32	33	34	35	36	37	38	39	40	41	42	43	44	45	46
Ground	H	A	A	H	H	A	H	H	A	A	A	H	H	A	A	H	H	A	H	A	H	A	H	A	A	H	A	H	A	A	H	H	A	H	H	A	A	H	A	H	A	H	H	A	A	H
Result	W	L	D	W	D	W	D	W	W	W	D	L	D	W	L	W	W	W	W	W	L	W	W	D	W	W	L	W	L	L	L	W	D	L	W	W	W	L	L	W	W	L	D	L	D	D
Position	3	12	11	6	8	6	7	4	3	2	3	7	9	3	5	3	2	2	2	2	3	3	2	1	1	1	3	2	2	2	3	3	4	4	3	3	3	4	4	4	4	4	4	4	4	4

Source: soccerbase.com
A = Away; H = Home; W = Win; D = Draw; L = Loss

== League One ==
The fixture list for the 2014/15 campaign will be announced on 18 June 2014. It was confirmed that Swindon Town would start their 2014/15 campaign with a home fixture against Scunthorpe United.

Win Draw Loss

=== August ===
9 August 2014 League One	Swindon Town	3–1	Scunthorpe United	Swindon
15:00	Luongo 3'; M. Smith 12' 45' (yellow card) 70'; Turnbull (yellow card) 80'	Report	Madden 20'; Williams (red card) 80'	Stadium: County Ground; Attendance: 7,060; Referee: Stuart Attwell (Warwickshire)

16 August 2014 League One	Crawley Town	1–0	Swindon Town	Crawley
15:00	Tomlin (yellow card) 68'; McLeod 51' (pen.); Bawling (yellow card) 90'	Report	Branco (yellow card) 40'; L. Thompson (red card) 51'	Stadium: Broadfield Stadium; Attendance: 2,710; Referee: James Linington (Isle of Wight)

19 August 2014 League One	Gillingham	2–2	Swindon Town	Gillingham
19:45	Kedwell 9' (yellow card) 79'; Hause 51' (yellow card) 52'	Report	Williams 41'; Kasim (yellow card) 87'; Bywater 90' (o.g.)	Stadium: Priestfield; Attendance: 5,264; Referee: Charles Breakspear (Surrey)

23 August 2014 League One	Swindon Town	2–0	Crewe Alexandra	Swindon
15:00	Kasim 34'; Williams 77'	Report		Stadium: County Ground; Attendance: 6,530; Referee: Lee Collins (Surrey)

30 August 2014 League One	Swindon Town	1–1	Coventry City	Swindon
15:00	Turnbull (yellow card) 68'; Branco 72' (yellow card) 90'	Report	McQuoid 41'; Johnson (yellow card) 61'	Stadium: County Ground; Attendance: 7,299; Referee: Darren Deadman (Cambridgeshire)

=== September ===
6 September 2014 League One	Chesterfield	P–P	Swindon Town	Chesterfield
15:00		Report		Stadium: Proact Stadium

13 September 2014 League One	Bradford City	1–2	Swindon Town	Bradford
15:00	L. Thompson 10' (o.g.); Kennedy (yellow card) 47'; Clarke (yellow card) 90'; Sheehan (red card) 90'	Report	Obika 23' 43'; Branco (yellow card) 53'; Kasim (yellow card) 76'	Stadium: Valley Parade; Attendance: 12,486; Referee: Richard Clark (Northumberland)

16 September 2014 League One	Swindon Town	2–2	Oldham Athletic	Swindon
19:45	Obika 27'; Williams 80'	Report	Dayton 23'; Kelly (yellow card) 50'; Jones (yellow card) 56'; Philliskirk (yellow card) 65'; Morgan-Smith 84'	Stadium: County Ground; Attendance: 6,332; Referee: Graham Horwood (Bedfordshire)

20 September 2014 League One	Swindon Town	5–2	Sheffield United	Swindon
15:00	M. Smith 13' 55' (pen.); Byrne (yellow card) 31'; Obika 58'; Williams 76'; L. Thompson 86'	Report	Scougill (yellow card) 30'; Basham (yellow card) 51'; McNulty 66'; Davies 72' (yellow card) 90'	Stadium: County Ground; Attendance: 7,536; Referee: Gavin Ward (Surrey)

27 September 2014 League One	Barnsley	0–3	Swindon Town	Barnsley
15:00		Report	Stephens (yellow card) 42'; Byrne 58'; Reeves 82'; Williams 83'	Stadium: Oakwell; Attendance: 8,879; Referee: Chris Kavanagh (Lancashire)

=== October ===
4 October 2014 League One	Leyton Orient	1–2	Swindon Town	London
15:00	Simpson (yellow card) 9'; Baudry (yellow card) 66'; Cox (yellow card) 90'; Clarke (yellow card) 90'; Henderson 90'	Report	M. Smith 29'; Turnbull (yellow card) 32'; Byrne 47'; Kasim (yellow card) 90'; Foderingham (yellow card) 90'	Stadium: Brisbane Road; Attendance: 5,472; Referee: Tim Robinson (West Sussex)

11 October 2014 League One	Swindon Town	P–P	Preston North End	Swindon
15:00		Report		Stadium: County Ground

18 October 2014 League One	Yeovil Town	1–1	Swindon Town	Yeovil
15:00	Hayter (yellow card) 23' (goal) 34'; Nugent (yellow card) 74'	Report	N. Thompson (red card) 79'; Williams 71'; L. Thompson (yellow card) 89'	Stadium: Huish Park; Attendance: 5,679; Referee: Scott Mathieson (Cheshire)

21 October 2014 League One	Swindon Town	2–3	Rochdale	Swindon
19:45	Rodgers 35'; Smith 77'	Report	Lund 49' (yellow card) 51'; Vincenti 60'; Dawson (yellow card) 71'; Hery 90+2'	Stadium: County Ground; Attendance: 6,718; Referee: Stephen Martin (Staffordshire)

25 October 2014 League One	Swindon Town	2–2	Colchester United	Swindon
15:00	Smith 27', 48'	Report	Gilbey (yellow card) 39'; Healey 47' (yellow card) 68'; Massey 52'; Watt (yellow card) 75'	Stadium: County Ground; Attendance: 7,871; Referee: Chris Sarginson (Staffordshire)

28 October 2014 League One	Chesterfield	0–3	Swindon Town	Chesterfield
19:45	Jones (yellow card) 27'; Evatt (yellow card) 29'; Morsy (yellow card) 36'	Report	Kasim 30'; Byrne 34'; Williams 70'; Stephens (yellow card) 85'	Stadium: Proact Stadium; Attendance: 6,144; Referee: Scott Duncan (Northumberland)

=== November ===
1 November 2014 League One	Milton Keynes Dons	2–1	Swindon Town	Milton Keynes
15:00	McFadzean (yellow card) 30'; Potter (yellow card) 35'; Alli 51'; Bowditch (yellow card) 54'; Kay 59' (yellow card) 69'; Lewington (yellow card) 84'	Report	Obika 6'; L. Thompson (yellow card) 42'; Smith (yellow card) 69'; Stephens (yellow card) 75'	Stadium: Stadium mk Attendance: 9,494; Referee: Eddie Ilderton (Tyne & Wear)

4 November 2014 League One	Swindon Town	1–0	Preston North End	Swindon
19:45	Stephens (yellow card) 74'; Williams 84'; Gladwin (yellow card) 90+3'	Report	Kilkenny (yellow card) 64'	Stadium: County Ground; Attendance: 6,646; Referee: Oliver Langford (West Midlands)

15 November 2014 League One	Swindon Town	1–0	Bristol City	Swindon
15:00	Smith (yellow card) 44' (goal) 78'; L. Thompson (yellow card) 58'	Report	Elliott (red card) 3'; Wagstaff (yellow card) 5'; Wilbraham (yellow card) 30'	Stadium: County Ground; Attendance: 12,565; Referee: Darren Drysdale (Lincolnshire)

22 November 2014 League One	Peterborough United	1–2	Swindon Town	Peterborough
15:00	Newell 90+2'	Report	Williams 33'; Obika 47'	Stadium: London Road; Attendance: 7,182; Referee: Phil Gibbs (West Midlands)

29 November 2014 League One	Swindon Town	1–0	Fleetwood Town	Swindon
15:00	Gladwin 86'; Luongo (yellow card) 90+4'	Report	Jordan (yellow card) 18'; Hitchcock (yellow card) 29'; Schumacher (yellow card) 40'; Evans (yellow card) 61'	Stadium: County Ground; Attendance: 10,506; Referee: Keith Hill (Hertfordshire)

=== December ===
13 December 2014 League One	Notts County	0–3	Swindon Town	Nottingham
15:00	Noble (red card) 55'; Carroll (yellow card) 61'; Hollis (yellow card) 85'	Report	Williams 6' 54'; L. Thompson (yellow card) 40'; Kasim (yellow card) 45'; Luongo 59'	Stadium: Meadow Lane; Attendance: 4,753; Referee: Darren Deadman (Cambridgeshire)

20 December 2014 League One	Swindon Town	0–1	Doncaster Rovers	Swindon
15:00	Stephens (yellow card) 90+1'	Report	Robinson 26' (pen.); Bennett (yellow card) 27'; Wellens (yellow card) 60'; Furman (yellow card) 69'; Wabara (yellow card) 80'; Johnstone (yellow card) 90+5'	Stadium: County Ground; Attendance: 7,793; Referee: Kevin Johnson (Somerset)

26 December 2014 League One	Walsall	1–4	Swindon Town	Walsall
15:00	Bradshaw 18'; Chambers (yellow card) 34'; Purkiss (yellow card) 59'	Report	Smith 3'; Luongo (yellow card) 23' (goal) 46'; Williams 51' 57'	Stadium: Bescot Stadium; Attendance: 5,696; Referee: David Webb (Lancashire)

28 December 2014 League One	Swindon Town	1–0	Port Vale	Swindon
15:00	Williams 56'; Luongo (yellow card) 80'; Toffolo (yellow card) 90+5'	Report	Dodds (yellow card) 39'; Brown (yellow card) 54'	Stadium: County Ground; Attendance: 9,248; Referee: Darren Sheldrake (Surrey)

=== January ===
3 January 2015 League One	Fleetwood Town	2–2	Swindon Town	Fleetwood
15:00	Hughes (yellow card) 28'; Morris 49', 59'; McLaughlin (yellow card) 84'; Crainey (yellow card) 89'	Report	Williams 71'; Toffolo (yellow card) 86'; L. Thompson 88'	Stadium: Highbury Stadium; Attendance: Geoff Eltringham (County Durham); Referee: 3,346

12 January 2015 League One	Coventry City	0–3	Swindon Town	Coventry
19:45	Webster (yellow card) 35'	Report	Williams 8', 18' (pen.); N. Thompson (yellow card) 43'; Obika 81'	Stadium: Ricoh Arena; Attendance: 7,098; Referee: Keith Stroud (Dorset)

17 January 2015 League One	Swindon Town	3–1	Chesterfield	Swindon
15:00	Stephens 17'; Swift 25'; Williams 47'	Report	Clucas 22'; Doyle (yellow card) 45+2'; Raglan (yellow card) 77'	Stadium: County Ground; Attendance: 7,981; Referee: Nigel Miller (County Durham)

24 January 2015 League One	Swindon Town	P–P	Bradford City	Swindon
15:00		Report		Stadium: County Ground

31 January 2015 League One	Sheffield United	2–0	Swindon Town	Sheffield
15:00	Kennedy (yellow card) 8'; Higdon (yellow card) 20'; Murphy 73', 90+2'; Baxter (yellow card) 80'	Report	Turnbull (yellow card) 12'; Branco (yellow card) 29'; Swift (yellow card) 31'; Toffolo (yellow card) 64'; N. Thompson (yellow card) 68'; Byrne (yellow card) 81'	Stadium: Bramall Lane; Attendance: 19,490; Referee: David Coote (Nottinghamshire)

=== February ===
7 February 2015 League One	Swindon Town	2–0	Barnsley	Swindon
15:00	Branco 14'; Gladwin 84'; Kasim (yellow card) 90+3'	Report		Stadium: County Ground; Attendance: 8,380; Referee: Gary Sutton (Lincolnshire)

10 February 2015 League One	Oldham Athletic	2–1	Swindon Town	Boundary Park
19:45	Jones 10'; Wilkinson 11'; Mills (yellow card) 90'; Poleon (yellow card) 90+5'	Report	Branco (yellow card) 7'; L. Thompson (yellow card) 32'; Luongo (yellow card) 60' (goal) 63'; Swift (yellow card) 73'; Stephens (yellow card) 90+5'	Attendance: 3,451; Referee: Scott Duncan (Northumberland)

14 February 2015 League One	Scunthorpe United	3–1	Swindon Town	Scunthorpe
15:00	Williams (yellow card) 41'; Madden 62'; O'Neil (yellow card) 68'; Canavan 76' van Veen 79' (yellow card) 80'	Report	Williams (yellow card) 37'; Smith 44'; Branco (yellow card) 61'	Stadium: Glanford Park; Attendance: 3,763; Referee: Fred Graham (Essex)

21 February 2015 League One	Swindon Town	1–2	Crawley Town	Swindon
15:00	N. Thompson (yellow card) 35'; Byrne (yellow card) 37'; Williams 58'; Turnbull (yellow card) 90+4'	Report	Wordsworth 5' (yellow card) 90+3'; Tomlin (yellow card) 43' (goal) 88'; McLeod (yellow card) 55'	Stadium: County Ground; Attendance: 7,692; Referee: Graham Horwood (Bedfordshire)

24 February 2015 League One	Swindon Town	2–1	Bradford City	Swindon
15:00	Luongo 15', 34'; L. Thompson (yellow card) 23'; N. Thompson (yellow card) 80'	Report	Meredith (yellow card) 11'; MacKenzie (yellow card) 36'; Liddle (yellow card) 39'; Clarke 54'; Darby (yellow card) 90+4'	Stadium: County Ground; Attendance: 6,812; Referee: Carl Berry (Surrey)

28 February 2015 League One	Crewe Alexandra	0–0	Swindon Town	Crewe
15:00	Ray (yellow card) 32'; Jones (yellow card) 43'; Ness (yellow card) 55'; Tate (red card) 90+8'	Report	N. Thompson (yellow card) 50'; Branco (yellow card) 52'; Stephens (red card) 89'; Luongo (yellow card) 83'; Smith (yellow card) 83'	Stadium: Gresty Road; Attendance: 4,781; Referee: Graham Salisbury (Lancashire)

=== March ===
3 March 2015 League One	Swindon Town	0–3	Gillingham	Swindon
19:45	Turnbull (yellow card) 36'; Branco (yellow card) 59'; Foderingham (yellow card) 64'	Report	McDonald 29', 88'; Loft (yellow card) 41'; Hessenthaler 46'; Pritchard (yellow card) 48'; Egan (yellow card) 61'; Dack (yellow card) 64'	Stadium: County Ground; Attendance: 7,025; Referee: Tim Robinson (West Sussex)

7 March 2015 League One	Swindon Town	3–0	Notts County	Swindon
15:00	Byrne (yellow card) 8'; Turnbull (yellow card) 29'; Swift 58'; Williams 64' (pen.); Toffolo 89'; Hylton (yellow card) 90+5'	Report	McCourt (yellow card) 28'; Adams (yellow card) 64'; Carroll (yellow card) 69'; Noble (red card) 85'	Stadium: County Ground; Attendance: 8,013; Referee: Gavin Ward (Surrey)

14 March 2015 League One	Port Vale	0–1	Swindon Town	Burslem
15:00	Brown (yellow card) 50'; Veseli (yellow card) 88'	Report	Branco 8'; Byrne (yellow card) 60'; Gladwin (yellow card) 84'; Kasim (yellow card) 86'; Branco (yellow card) 89'	Stadium: Vale Park; Attendance: 5,120; Referee: Andy Madley (West Yorkshire)

17 March 2015 League One	Doncaster Rovers	1–2	Swindon Town	Doncaster
19:45	Main 41'	Report	Smith 54' (pen.); Obika 90+1'	Stadium: Keepmoat Stadium; Attendance: 5,258; Referee: Tony Harrington (Cleveland)

21 March 2015 League One	Swindon Town	P–P	Walsall	Swindon
15:00		Report		Stadium: County Ground

28 March 2015 League One	Colchester United	P–P	Swindon Town	Colchester
15:00		Report		Stadium: Colchester Community Stadium

=== April ===
4 April 2015 League One	Swindon Town	0–3	Milton Keynes Dons	Swindon
15:00	Smith (yellow card) 40'; Thompson (yellow card) 47'	Report	Powell 60'; Grigg 72' 88'	Stadium: County Ground; Attendance: 10,087; Referee: Paul Tierney (Lancashire)

6 April 2015 League One	Bristol City	3–0	Swindon Town	Bristol
15:00	Agard 36' (yellow card) 57'; Bryan 80'; Wilbraham 87'	Report	Turnbull (yellow card) 10'; Kasim (yellow card) 42'; Branco (yellow card) 79'	Stadium: Ashton Gate; Attendance: 12,302; Referee: Neil Swarbrick (Lancashire)

11 April 2015 League One	Swindon Town	1–0	Peterborough United	Swindon
15:00	Turnbull (yellow card) 8'; Toffolo (yellow card) 23'; Hylton 71'	Report	Smith (yellow card) 28'	Stadium: County Ground; Attendance: 7,126; Referee: Andy Davies (Hampshire)

14 April 2015 League One	Rochdale	2–4	Swindon Town	Rochdale
19:45	Henderson 45' (pen.); Thompson 90' (o.g.)	Report	Gladwin 20' 33' 40' (pen.); Smith 23'; Hylton (yellow card) 90'	Stadium: Spotland; Attendance: 2,344; Referee: Nigel Miller (Co. Durham)

18 April 2015 League One	Swindon Town	0–1	Yeovil Town	Swindon
15:00		Report	Kingsley (yellow card) 29'; Berrett 58'	Stadium: County Ground; Attendance: 8,490; Referee: Jeremy Simpson (Lancashire)

21 April 2015 League One	Swindon Town	3–3	Walsall	Swindon
19:45	Gladwin 59' (pen.) 67' (pen.); Turnbull 81'	Report	Morris 18'; Hiwula 53'; Sawyers 74'; Forde (yellow card) 80'	Stadium: County Ground; Attendance: 6,305; Referee: Iain Williamson (Bristol)

25 April 2015 League One	Preston North End	3–0	Swindon Town	Preston
15:00	Garner 2' 45' 50'; Welsh (yellow card) 79'	Report	Barthram (yellow card) 35'; Turnbull (yellow card) 41'	Stadium: Deepdale; Attendance: 17,621; Referee: Gary Sutton (Lincolnshire)

28 April 2015 League One	Colchester United	1–1	Swindon Town	Colchester
19:45	Murphy 1'; Briggs (yellow card) 18'; Massey (yellow card) 31'; Gilbey (yellow card) 61'	Report	Thompson (yellow card) 39'; Branco (yellow card) 50'; Gladwin 53'	Stadium: Colchester Community Stadium; Attendance: 4,395; Referee: Kevin Johnson (Somerset)

=== May ===
2 May 2015 League One	Swindon Town	2–2	Leyton Orient	Swindon
12:15	T. Belford (red card) 20'; Rodgers 61'; Stephens (yellow card) 65'; Williams (yellow card) 69' (goal) 86' (pen.)	Report	James (penalty missed); Cox 40'; Dagnall 47'; Baudry (yellow card) 60'	Stadium: County Ground; Attendance: 8,609; Referee: Dean Whitestone (Northamptonshire)

== League One play-offs ==
=== Semi-final ===
7 May 2015 L1 Semi-Final	Sheffield United	1–2	Swindon Town	Sheffield
19:45	Freeman 19'; Harris (yellow card) 31'; Davies (yellow card) 38'	Report	Ricketts 50' (yellow card) 65'; Byrne 90'; Kasim (yellow card) 77'	Stadium: Bramall Lane; Attendance: 20,890; Referee: Darren Bond (Lancashire)

11 May 2015 L1 Semi-Final	Swindon Town	5–5	Sheffield United	Swindon
19:45	Gladwin 4' 10' (yellow card) 90+1'; Smith 18' 59' (pen.); Rodgers (yellow card) 78'; Obika 84' (yellow card) 85'; Kasim (yellow card) 90+6'; Byrne (yellow card) 90+9'	Report	Thompson 19' (o.g.); Basham 38'; McEveley (yellow card) 45'; Howard (yellow card) 58'; S. Davies 65'; Coutts (yellow card) 67'; Alcock (yellow card) 81'; Done 88'; Adams 90'	Stadium: County Ground; Attendance: 13,065; Referee: Keith Hill (Hertfordshire)

=== Final ===
24 May 2015 L1 Final	Preston North End	4–0	Swindon Town	London
17:30	Beckford 3' 44' 57'; Huntingdon 13'	Report	Kasim (yellow card) 54'	Stadium: Wembley Stadium; Attendance: 48,236; Referee: Andrew Madley (West Yorkshire)

== The FA Cup ==
=== FA Cup results ===
Win Draw Loss

The draw for the first round of the FA Cup was made on 27 October 2014.

8 November 2014 First round	Cheltenham Town	5–0	Swindon Town	Cheltenham
15:00	Harrison 10', 53', 84'; Gornell 36' (yellow card) 74'; Braham-Barrett (yellow card) 38'; Richards 72'	Report	N. Thompson (red card) 21'; Turnbull (yellow card) 70'; Byrne (yellow card) 88'	Stadium: Whaddon Road; Attendance: 3,470; Referee: Carl Boyeson

== The League Cup ==
The draw for the First Round of the League Cup is to be made on 17 June 2014. It was announced that Swindon Town's First Round opponents would be Football Conference champions, Luton Town.

=== League Cup results ===
Win Draw Loss

12 August 2014 League Cup R1	Luton Town	1–2	Swindon Town	Luton
19:45	Rooney 53' (pen.) (yellow card) 90' (yellow-red card)	Report	M. Smith 76' (pen.) 81'	Stadium: Kenilworth Road; Attendance: 4,410 (436 aways fans); Referee: Paul Tierney (Lancashire)

26 August 2014 League Cup R2	Swindon Town	2–4 (a.e.t.)	Brighton & Hove Albion	County Ground, Swindon
19:45	L. Thompson 46'; Kasim 112'; N. Thompson (yellow card) 59' (yellow-red card) 120+3'	Report	Ince 10'; Colunga 95'; Forster-Caskey 100' (pen.), 120+3' (pen.)	Attendance: 5,414; Referee: Andy Madley (West Yorkshire)

== The Football League Trophy ==
24 September 2014 R1 (South)	Newport County	1–2	Swindon Town	Newport
19:45	Klukowski 81' (yellow card); O'Connor (yellow card); Zebroski (yellow card)	Report	Obika 45'; Williams 62'; Belford (yellow card); Rodgers (yellow card)	Stadium: Rodney Parade; Attendance: 1,822; Referee: Tim Robinson (West Sussex)

7 October 2014 R2 (South)	Plymouth Argyle	3–2	Swindon Town	Plymouth
19:45	Smalley 23'; Alessandra 4', 44'; Harvey (yellow card)		Gladwin 87'; Smith 72' (pen.); N. Thompson (yellow card)	Stadium: Home Park; Attendance: 2,668; Referee: Carl Berry (Surrey)

=== Football League Trophy results ===
Win Draw Loss

== Pre-season ==
The first friendly confirmed by the club was a home fixture against Premier League side, Southampton. However, Non-League sides Yate Town and Swindon Supermarine confirmed friendlies on their respective websites some weeks beforehand. A friendly was announced by Charlton Athletic but it was later cancelled.

Win Draw Loss

11 July 2014 Friendly	Yate Town	0–2	Swindon Town	Lodge Road, Yate
19:30		Report	Kalinga 61'; Luongo 90'	Attendance: 314; Referee: Robert Cockle (Bristol)

12 July 2014 Friendly	Swindon Supermarine	0–3	Swindon Town	Webb's Wood Stadium, South Marston
15:00		Report	Smith; Luongo; Lambin

15 July 2014 Friendly	Petersfield Town	2–5	Swindon Town	The Love Lane Stadium, Petersfield
19:45	Howes; Coker	Report	Smith 37' (pen.) 43'; Randall 68' 73'; Barker 80'	Attendance: 400

17 July 2014 Friendly	Eastleigh	2–0	Swindon Town	Eastleigh
19:00	D'Ath 6'; McAllister 90'	Report		Stadium: Silverlake Stadium

21 July 2014 Friendly	Swindon Town	0–1	Southampton	Swindon
19:30		Report	Hooiveld 51'	Stadium: County Ground; Attendance: 3,958

24 July 2014 Friendly	Bedfont & Feltham	2–3	Swindon Town	The Orchard, Bedfont
19:45		Report	Romeo; Cooke; Own Goal

26 July 2014 Friendly	Bromley	1–1	Swindon Town	Hayes Lane, Bromley
15:00	Higgins 51'	Report	Smith 56'

29 July 2014 Friendly	Swindon Town	1–2	Leeds United	Swindon
19:45	Smith 31'	Report	Morison 16'; Austin 47' (pen.)	Stadium: County Ground; Attendance: 3,769 (961 Leeds)

1 August 2014 Friendly	Swindon Town	4–1	Aston Villa XI	Swindon
15:00	L. Thompson 38'; Gladwin 64' 79'; Williams 73'	Report	Bennett 68'	Stadium: County Ground; Attendance: 1,148
