= Anton Rodgers (footballer) =

Irish professional footballer (born 1993)

Personal information
- Full name: Anton Michael Rodgers
- Date of birth: 26 January 1993 (age 33)
- Place of birth: Reading, England
- Height: 5 ft 6 1/2 in (1.69 m)
- Position: Midfielder

Team information
- Current team: Basingstoke Town

Youth career
- 2006–2011: Chelsea
- 2011–2013: Brighton & Hove Albion

Senior career*
Years	Team	Apps	(Gls)
2012–2013	Brighton & Hove Albion	0	(0)
2013	→ Exeter City (loan)	2	(0)
2013–2014	Oldham Athletic	7	(0)
2014–2017	Swindon Town	68	(5)
2017–2018	Hungerford Town	19	(1)
2018–2019	Wealdstone	0	(0)
2019	Bracknell Town		
2019–2021	Marlow	11	(0)
2021–	Basingstoke Town	31	(3)

International career^{‡}
2009	Republic of Ireland U17		
2010	Republic of Ireland U19	2	(0)
- * Club domestic league appearances and goals as of 13:37, 3 May 2023 (UTC) ‡ National team caps and goals as of 11:55, 21 March 2018 (UTC)

Anton Michael Rodgers (born 26 January 1993) is a footballer who plays as a midfielder for Isthmian League South Central Division side Basingstoke Town. Born in England, he has represented Ireland at youth level.

== Club career ==
After departing the youth setup at Chelsea in May 2011, Rodgers joined the academy of recently promoted Championship club Brighton & Hove Albion, signing an initial one-year contract with the option of a further year which was taken up by the club in the summer of 2012. Rodgers made his professional debut and only appearance for Brighton in an FA Cup match against Wrexham on 7 January 2012. On 20 March 2013, Rodgers joined League Two side Exeter City on an initial two-month loan deal. Rodgers made his professional League début for Exeter on 9 April during a 4–1 defeat at Rotherham United, appearing as a 70th-minute substitute. On 21 May 2013, Rodgers was released by Brighton, along with former Chelsea teammate Ben Sampayo.

On 12 July 2013, Rodgers signed for League One side Oldham Athletic on a one-year contract. On 10 August 2013, Rodgers made his Oldham debut in their 1–0 home defeat against Walsall, replacing James Dayton in the 74th minute. On 3 September 2013, Rodgers was given his first Oldham start in their Football League Trophy away tie against Shrewsbury Town, featuring for 71 minutes before being replaced by David Mellor. The game resulted in a 4–1 victory for the visitors with Danny Philliskirk scoring a hat-trick. Rodgers was released by Oldham at the end of the 2013–14 season after limited appearances in the first team.

On 17 July 2014, preceding his release from Oldham, Rodgers joined League One side Swindon Town. On 23 September 2014, Rodgers made his Swindon debut in a Football League Trophy 2–1 victory over Newport County, in which he replaced Louis Thompson in the 58th minute. A month later, Rodgers scored on his league debut for the club in their 3–2 home defeat against Rochdale, netting the game's opener in the 35th minute.

In June 2017, Celtic manager Brendan Rodgers fielded his son, Anton, as a trialist during the Scottish champions' 1–0 friendly win over BW Linz in Austria. He was a free agent after leaving Swindon Town.

On 3 November 2017, Rodgers joined National League South side Hungerford Town following his release from Swindon. Following a lack of game time, Rodgers opted to leave Hungerford; however, just two months later he rejoined the club.

In July 2018, Rodgers was fielded as a trialist for Peterborough United in their pre-season friendlies.

In September 2018, he joined Falkirk on trial after leaving Hungerford at the end of the 2017/18 season.

Rodgers featured for Wealdstone and Bracknell Town during the 2018–19 season. On 19 August 2019, Rodgers joined Marlow.

On 1 October 2021, Basingstoke Town announced the signing of Rodgers for the 2021–22 season.

== International career ==
Rodgers has been capped twice by the Republic of Ireland U19, making his debut against Luxembourg on 7 October 2010. He is eligible to play for England through birth, and Northern Ireland or the Republic of Ireland through parentage.

== Personal life ==
Rodgers is the son of former Celtic manager Brendan Rodgers.

== Career statistics ==
As of match played 28 April 2018.

Club	Season	League			FA Cup		League Cup		Other		Total	
Club	Season	Division	Apps	Goals	Apps	Goals	Apps	Goals	Apps	Goals	Apps	Goals
Brighton & Hove Albion	2011–12	Championship	0	0	1	0	0	0	—		1	0
Exeter City (loan)	2012–13	League Two	2	0	0	0	0	0	0	0	2	0
Oldham Athletic	2013–14	League One	7	0	4	0	0	0	3 (Note: Appearance(s) in Football League Trophy)	0	14	0
Swindon Town	2014–15	League One	10	2	0	0	0	0	3 (Note: Two appearances in Football League Trophy, one in League One play-offs)	0	13	2
Swindon Town	2015–16	League One	36	2	1	0	0	0	2	1	39	3
Swindon Town	2016–17	League One	22	1	1	0	1	0	3 (Note: Appearance(s) in EFL Trophy)	0	27	1
Swindon Town	Total		68	5	2	0	1	0	8	1	79	6
Hungerford Town	2017–18	National League South	19	1	0	0	—		1 (Note: Appearance(s) in FA Trophy)	0	20	1
Career total			96	6	7	0	1	0	12	1	116	7
