= George Barker (footballer, born 1991) =

English footballer

Personal information
- Full name: George John Barker
- Date of birth: 26 September 1991 (age 35)
- Place of birth: Portsmouth, England
- Height: 1.72 m (5 ft 7 1/2 in)
- Position: Forward

Team information
- Current team: AFC Portchester

Youth career
- 2008–2010: Brighton & Hove Albion

Senior career*
Years	Team	Apps	(Gls)
2010–2014	Brighton & Hove Albion	4	(0)
2011	→ Lewes (loan)	4	(1)
2012–2013	→ Barnet (loan)	1	(0)
2013	→ Newport County (loan)	2	(0)
2014–2015	Swindon Town	13	(0)
2014	→ Tranmere Rovers (loan)	4	(0)
2015–2016	Gosport Borough	30	(2)
2016–2018	Havant & Waterlooville	44	(1)
2018	Worthing	6	(3)
2018	Salisbury	2	(0)
2018	Staines Town		
2018–2020	Gosport Borough	15	(7)
2020-2021	Moneyfields	0	(0)
2021-	AFC Portchester	50	(18)
- * Club domestic league appearances and goals as of 12:53, 5 January 2023 (UTC)

George John Barker (born 26 September 1991) is an English semi-professional footballer who plays as forward for AFC Portchester.

Barker has played in the Football League for Brighton & Hove Albion, Barnet, Newport County, Tranmere Rovers and Swindon Town.

== Career ==
After youth spells at AC Fareham and Southampton, Barker joined Brighton & Hove Albion's youth team in 2008 and signed his first professional contract in 2010. He was on the bench for Brighton's 5–1 win over Barnsley in August 2012. In November 2012 he joined Barnet on loan deadline day. He made his debut at home to AFC Wimbledon on 8 December 2012, which was the only appearance he made for the Bees before his loan spell expired on 5 January.

He made his debut for Brighton on 12 March 2013, coming on as a 78th-minute substitute for Dean Hammond in a 2–1 loss away at Barnsley.

On 22 November 2013, Barker joined Newport County on loan until 1 January 2014 but only made two substitute appearances.

On 7 January 2014, Barker signed for Swindon Town on an eighteen-month contract for an undisclosed fee. Barker played only 13 league games for Town and was released at the end of his contract, which also included a loan spell with Tranmere Rovers.

Barker later played for Gosport Borough, Havant & Waterlooville, Salisbury and Staines Town before re-joining Gosport Borough in December 2018.

In June 2020 Barker signed for Southern League Division One side Moneyfields.

In the summer of 2021, Barker joined Wessex League side AFC Portchester.

== Career statistics ==
=== Club ===
As of 2 May 2015

Club	Season	League		FA Cup		League Cup		FL Trophy		Other		Total	
Club	Season	Apps	Goals	Apps	Goals	Apps	Goals	Apps	Goals	Apps	Goals	Apps	Goals
Brighton & Hove Albion	2010–11	0	0	0	0	0	0	0	0	0	0	0	0
Brighton & Hove Albion	2011–12	0	0	0	0	0	0	0	0	0	0	0	0
Brighton & Hove Albion	2012–13	3	0	0	0	0	0	0	0	0	0	3	0
Brighton & Hove Albion	2013–14	1	0	0	0	0	0	0	0	0	0	1	0
Brighton & Hove Albion	Total	4	0	0	0	0	0	0	0	0	0	4	0
Lewes (loan)	2011	4	0	0	0	0	0	0	0	0	0	4	0
Barnet (loan)	2012	2	0	0	0	0	0	0	0	0	0	2	0
Newport County (loan)	2013	1	0	0	0	0	0	0	0	0	0	1	0
Swindon Town	2014	8	0	0	0	0	0	0	0	0	0	8	0
Swindon Town	2014–15	5	0	0	0	1	0	2	0	0	0	8	0
Swindon Town	Total	13	0	0	0	1	0	2	0	0	0	16	0
Tranmere Rovers (loan)	2014	4	0	0	0	0	0	0	0	0	0	4	0
Career total		28	1	0	0	1	0	2	0	0	0	31	1
