= Tyrell Belford =

English footballer (born 1994)

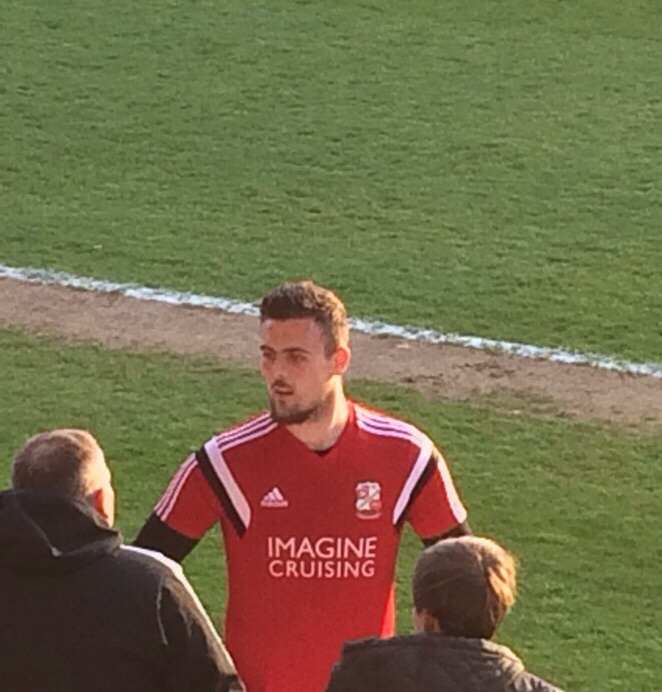

Personal information
- Full name: Tyrell Belford
- Date of birth: 6 May 1994 (age 32)
- Place of birth: Nuneaton, England
- Height: 1.84 m (6 ft 0 in)
- Position: Goalkeeper

Team information
- Current team: Romulus (manager)

Youth career
- –2009: Coventry City
- 2009–2013: Liverpool

Senior career*
Years	Team	Apps	(Gls)
2013–2016	Swindon Town	56	(0)
2016	→ Southport (loan)	11	(0)
2016–2017	Oxford City	18	(0)
2017	Nuneaton Town	16	(0)
2017	Hinckley AFC	15	(0)
2018–2019	Romulus	28	(0)
2019–	Hinckley AFC	12	(0)
2019–?	Nuneaton Borough	10	(0)
2020–?	Stratford Town	20	
2021–2023	Stafford Rangers	8	(0)

International career
2010	England U16	10	(0)
2011	England U17	7	(0)

Managerial career
- 2025–: Romulus
- * Club domestic league appearances and goals as of 12 January 2018 (UTC)

Tyrell Belford (born 6 May 1994 in Nuneaton), is an English former professional footballer and manager who played as a goalkeeper. He is currently manager of Romulus.

== Club career ==
Belford started his career as a junior with Coventry City before joining Liverpool's youth system in 2009.

Belford signed a two-year contract with Swindon Town on 31 July 2013 after being released from Liverpool and later made his debut for the Wiltshire club when he played the whole 90 minutes of Swindon's 2–1 Football League Trophy victory over Plymouth Argyle. On 28 June 2016, Belford joined National League side Southport on a season-long loan. On the opening day of the 2016–17 campaign, Belford made his Southport debut in a 3–0 away defeat to newly relegated side Dagenham & Redbridge. However, after appearing only nine times by November, due to a change in management, Belford returned to Swindon Town.

On 11 November 2016, Swindon Town announced that Belford would leave the club after a mutual termination within his contract.

After being released from Swindon Town, Belford joined National League South side Oxford City on the same day.

Tyrell joined Nuneaton Town the following year, but was released by mutual consent on 25 September 2017. Following this Belford, had spells at Hinckley AFC and Swindon Supermarine, before announcing he would be taking a break from football. He started the 2018–19 season at Romulus.

In late 2019 he returned to Nuneaton Borough.

He joined Stratford Town in June 2020 before a move to Stafford Rangers in December 2021.

== International career ==
Belford represented England at both Under-16 and Under-17 level.

== Managerial career ==
On 28 August 2025, Belford was appointed manager of Romulus.

== Personal life ==
Belford's father Dale and brother Cameron are also goalkeepers.

== Career statistics ==
As of match played 13 January 2018.

Appearances and goals by club, season and competition
Club	Season	League			FA Cup		League Cup		Other		Total	
Club	Season	Division	Apps	Goals	Apps	Goals	Apps	Goals	Apps	Goals	Apps	Goals
Swindon Town	2013–14	League One	5	0	1	0	0	0	3 (Note: Appearance(s) in Football League Trophy)	0	9	0
Swindon Town	2014–15	League One	2	0	0	0	0	0	2	0	4	0
Swindon Town	2015–16	League One	8	0	0	0	0	0	1	0	9	0
Swindon Town	Total		56	0	1	0	0	0	6	0	22	0
Southport (loan)	2016–17	National League	9	0	0	0	—		0	0	9	0
Oxford City	2016–17	National League South	9	0	—		—		1 (Note: Appearance(s) in FA Trophy)	0	10	0
Nuneaton Town	2016–17	National League North	14	0	—		—		—		14	0
Nuneaton Town	2017–18	National League North	2	0	0	0	—		0	0	2	0
Nuneaton Town	Total		16	0	0	0	—		0	0	16	0
Hinckley AFC	2017–18	Midland Football League Division One	8	0	0	0	—		0	0	8	0
Swindon Supermarine	2017–18	Southern Football League Division One West	1	0	0	0	—		0	0	1	0
Career totals			57	0	1	0	0	0	7	0	65	0

== Honours ==
- 2011 FIFA U-17 World Cup: England squad member
