= Dale Belford =

English football player and manager (born 1967)

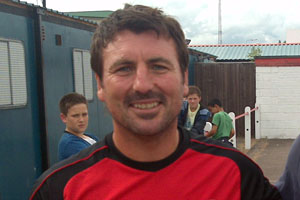
- Belford pictured in 2009

Personal information
- Full name: Dale Belford
- Date of birth: 11 July 1967 (age 59)
- Place of birth: Burton upon Trent, England
- Position: Goalkeeper

Team information
- Current team: Stratford Town (first team coach)

Youth career
- ?–1985: Aston Villa

Senior career*
Years	Team	Apps	(Gls)
1985–1986	Aston Villa	0	(0)
1986–1987	Sutton Coldfield Town		
1987	Notts County	1	(0)
1988	VS Rugby		
1988	Nuneaton Borough		
1988–1990	Tamworth		
1990–1991	Sutton Coldfield Town		
1991–1997	Tamworth		
1997–1998	Hinckley United	57	(0)
1998–2003	Atherstone United		
2003–2005	Gresley Rovers	65	(0)
2005	→ Hinckley United (loan)	1	(0)
2005–2006	Sutton Coldfield Town		
2006–2007	Tamworth	2	(0)
2007	Shepshed Dynamo		
2007	Coalville Town	1	(0)
2007–2008	Hinckley United	3	(0)
2008–2009	Atherstone Town		
2009–2010	Tamworth	1	(0)
2009	→ Atherstone Town (loan)		
2011–2014	Tamworth	1	(0)
2015	Nuneaton Griff	1	(0)

Managerial career
- 2007: Tamworth (caretaker)
- 2010–2011: Atherstone Town
- 2011: Tamworth (caretaker)
- 2013: Tamworth (caretaker)
- 2013–2014: Tamworth
- 2015–2016: Rugby Town
- 2017: Hinckley AFC
- 2024–2025: Stafford Rangers
- * Club domestic league appearances and goals

Dale Belford (born 11 July 1967) is an English football manager and former player who is assistant manager at Shepshed Dynamo. As a player, he spent most of his career playing as a goalkeeper.

== Playing career ==
=== Aston Villa and Sutton Coldfield Town ===
Born in Burton upon Trent, Staffordshire, Belford started his career as an apprentice for Aston Villa before signing a professional contract in July 1985, but after failing to secure a first team slot, he moved on to Sutton Coldfield Town in December 1986.

=== Notts County, VS Rugby and Nuneaton Borough ===
After only a few months with the club, Belford moved on to Notts County in March 1987 and spells with VS Rugby and Nuneaton Borough were soon to follow.

=== Tamworth ===
In October 1988, Belford joined Tamworth and set a club record of 712 minutes without conceding a goal in February and March 1989. He was part of the FA Vase winning team in 1989.

=== Second spell with Sutton Coldfield Town and Tamworth ===
Belford moved on in July 1990 for a second spell with Sutton Coldfield Town. For the rest of the 1990s, Belford became a well travelled non-league goalkeeper. He played for Tamworth (in his second spell).

=== Hinckley United and Atherstone United ===
Then signed for Hinckley United in July 1997 but left Hinckley in August 1998 due to work commitments. He moved on to Atherstone United, where he suffered a potentially career-ending broken ankle while playing for Atherstone in April 1999. He was honoured in a benefit game in August 1999. He returned to light training in October 1999, and in only his third game back after injury, he helped Nuneaton Sunday League side Lancet win the Tribune Cup in May 2000. He returned to play for Atherstone and at the end of the 2001–01 season won five awards at the club's presentation night, including the supporters' and players' player of year awards. In April 2002, he was given a commemorative plate before the first whistle of the match against Chippenham Town to mark his 100th consecutive appearance for Atherstone, and was named as the club's player of the year in May 2002. Atherstone went into liquidation in 2003 and Belford left to join Gresley Rovers.

=== Gresley Rovers ===
Belford joined Gresley Rovers in September 2003, and was voted the club's Players' Player of the Year at the end of the 2003–04 season. He missed almost four months of the 2004–05 season due to a back injury suffered in October 2004. He rejoined Hinckley United on loan in February 2005 for a second spell with the club.

=== Return to Sutton Coldfield Town again ===
Belford then moved on to the steps of a coaching role when he rejoined Sutton Coldfield Town in May 2005 as a player-goalkeeping coach.

=== Returning to Tamworth again ===
At the start of the 2006–07 season, Belford re-joined Tamworth for his third spell occupying the same role as player-goalkeeping coach. He and club captain Adie Smith took charge of the first-team following the departure of manager Mark Cooper and assistant- manager Richard Dryden in January 2007.

=== Shepshed Dynamo and Coalville Town ===
In 2007, Belford followed former Lambs Assistant Manager Richard Dryden to Northern Premier League First Division side Shepshed Dynamo, where he became the oldest player make his Shepshed debut in February 2007. Belford's stay at Shepshed Dynamo was a short one with him following former manager Adam Stevens to Midland Football Alliance side Coalville Town in June 2007.

=== Hinckley United and Atherstone Town ===
Dale then re-joined Hinckley United, now in the Conference North, for his third spell in September 2007, occupying a familiar role as player/goalkeeping coach. Belford joined former club Atherstone Town in July 2008 as assistant-manager and resigned from the role in April 2009, after guiding them to the play-offs of the Southern League Midland division.

== Managerial career ==
=== Atherstone Town ===
On 2 February 2010, it was announced that Belford was to become the new manager at Atherstone Town following the resignation of the previous manager Darren Fulford. After just over a year with the club, Belford left his post as manager.

=== Tamworth (caretaker) ===
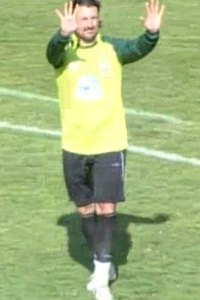
Belford playing for Tamworth in 2011

Belford once again returned to Tamworth as a player-coach in March 2011. Following Des Lyttle's departure as Tamworth manager in April 2011, Belford was appointed caretaker manager for the four remaining league games. His first game in charge was away at play-off chasing York City in which he won 2–1. His second game in charge ended in 1–0 defeat at home to fellow league strugglers Southport. The game ended with three Tamworth players receiving red cards (Liam Mitchell, Richard Tait and Michael Wylde). Belford's next game in charge was an away fixture at promotion chasing Wrexham. Due to the suspensions from the previous match Belford named himself as a substitute. Tamworth goalkeeper Louis Connor got injured in stoppage time and saw Belford donning the goalkeeper jersey once again for the last few minutes of the game. Belford is now the only player to play for Tamworth in four decades (1980s, 1990s, 2000s and 2010s). Belford's fourth and final game in charge saw him take on Forest Green Rovers in a must win game. In a very edgy 90 minutes, Tamworth did win the match 2–1 thus meaning Belford had kept the club in the Conference National at the expense of Southport who eventually stayed up due to Rushden & Diamonds entering liquidation.

Following a meeting with chairman Bob Andrews on Monday 14 January 2013 that saw Marcus Law was relieved of his manager duties, Dale Belford was once again appointed as caretaker-manager for the foreseeable future with former Lambs player Scott Lindsey as his assistant.

=== Rugby Town ===
Early into the 2015–16 season, Belford replaced Gary Mills as manager at Rugby Town. Belford left the club after a 9th-placed finish, in April 2016.

=== Stratford Town ===
On 25 January 2020, Belford was confirmed as assistant manager to Paul Davis at Stratford Town.

=== Stafford Rangers ===
In October 2024, Belford was appointed manager of Stafford Rangers.

=== Return to Stratford Town ===
On 14 January 2025, Belford returned to Stratford Town as first team coach.

== Personal life ==
He is the son of Tamworth kitman Buster Belford and the father of professional goalkeepers Cameron Belford and Tyrell Belford. His cousins are Stafford Rangers striker Kyle Perry and Bilston Town defender Todd Perry. Belford's maternal grandfather, Bill Scattergood also played for Nuneaton Borough, between 1947 and 1952.

== Honours ==
Tamworth

- FA Vase: 1988–89
