= Nathan Thompson (English footballer) =

English footballer (born 1990)

Personal information
- Full name: Nathan Michael Thompson
- Date of birth: 9 November 1990 (age 35)
- Place of birth: Chester, England
- Height: 5 ft 10 in (1.77 m)
- Position: Defender

Youth career
- –2010: Swindon Town

Senior career*
Years	Team	Apps	(Gls)
2010–2017	Swindon Town	167	(4)
2017–2019	Portsmouth	67	(1)
2019–2023	Peterborough United	115	(4)
2023–2025	Stevenage	41	(0)
2025–2026	Milton Keynes Dons	7	(0)
Total		397	(9)
- * Club domestic league appearances and goals as of 12:35, 30 April 2026 (BST)

Nathan Michael Thompson (born 9 November 1990) is an English former professional footballer who played as a defender.

== Career ==
=== Swindon Town ===
Thompson was born in Chester, Cheshire. He began his career with Swindon Town, moving from the youth set-up to become a professional in April 2009. Even before he signed the two-year deal he had reportedly received interest from Premier League sides Arsenal, Tottenham Hotspur, Everton and Newcastle United. He made his debut on 5 October 2010, as he replaced Scott Cuthbert in a Football League Trophy win over Torquay United. He made his league debut on 2 November 2010, when he played the full ninety minutes of a 3–0 home defeat to Charlton Athletic, and made two further first team appearances for Swindon in the rest of the 2010–11 season. He agreed a new 12-month contract with the club in summer 2011, but made just 7 first-team appearances under manager Paolo Di Canio over the following season.

He was offered a new contract with the club in May 2012. On 20 April 2013, Thompson was awarded the 2012/2013 Swindon Advertiser 'Player of the Year' after winning by more than 60 per cent of the fans' votes and Thompson won again in 2013/2014. On 30 May 2013, it was announced that both Nathan Thompson and his brother Louis had agreed new two-year contracts with Swindon.

Thompson was made club captain at Swindon Town in summer 2014.

On 9 October 2014, it was announced that Thompson had signed a new contract with Swindon, valid until summer 2017.

=== Portsmouth ===
On 22 June 2017, Thompson signed for newly promoted League One club Portsmouth on a two-year contract on a free transfer, having rejected the offer of a new contract at Swindon. He scored his first goal for Portsmouth against Sunderland in the 2019 EFL Trophy Final in which Portsmouth won on penalties. Thompson left after his contract expired in search for Championship football.

=== Peterborough United ===
On 16 August 2019, he signed for Peterborough United on a two-year deal. In May 2021, he signed a further two-year contract.

At the end of the 2022–23 season, Thompson was announced to be departing the club upon the expiration of his contract.

=== Stevenage ===
On 8 June 2023, Thompson signed for newly promoted League One club Stevenage. Later in the month, he was joined at the club by his brother.

=== Milton Keynes Dons ===
On 24 January 2025, Thompson signed for EFL League Two club Milton Keynes Dons for an undisclosed fee. He made his debut on 25 January 2025 in a goalless draw with rivals AFC Wimbledon, however suffered a serious knee injury the following game against Harrogate Town which kept him sidelined for the remainder of the season.

He departed the club by mutual consent on 30 January 2026, with head coach Paul Warne suggesting Thompson was close to retiring as a professional. Despite this, he made five appearances during the 2025–26 season and contributed to the club achieving a second-placed finish and promotion, Thompson's third and final promotion of his career.

== Personal life ==
His younger brother, Louis, is also a footballer. Nathan is studying for an MSc in Sports Directorship with VSI in Manchester.

== Career statistics ==
As of 11 November 2025

Appearances and goals by club, season and competition
Club	Season	League			FA Cup		League Cup		Other		Total	
Club	Season	Division	Apps	Goals	Apps	Goals	Apps	Goals	Apps	Goals	Apps	Goals
Swindon Town	2010–11	League One	3	0	0	0	0	0	1 (Note: Appearance(s) in Football League Trophy)	0	4	0
Swindon Town	2011–12	League Two	5	0	1	0	0	0	1	0	7	0
Swindon Town	2012–13	League One	26	0	1	0	2	0	0	0	29	0
Swindon Town	2013–14	League One	41	1	0	0	2	0	1	0	44	1
Swindon Town	2014–15	League One	35	0	1	0	2	0	5 (Note: Two appearances in Football League Trophy, three in League One play-offs)	0	43	0
Swindon Town	2015–16	League One	23	1	0	0	1	0	0	0	24	1
Swindon Town	2016–17	League One	34	2	1	0	1	0	0	0	36	2
Swindon Town	Total		167	4	4	0	8	0	8	0	187	4
Portsmouth	2017–18	League One	36	0	1	0	0	0	3 (Note: Two appearances in EFL Trophy and one in EFL Playoffs)	0	40	0
Portsmouth	2018–19	League One	31	0	2	0	0	0	5	1	38	1
Portsmouth	Total		67	0	3	0	0	0	8	1	78	1
Peterborough United	2019–20	League One	15	0	3	0	0	0	1	0	19	0
Peterborough United	2020–21	League One	39	2	1	0	1	0	2	0	43	2
Peterborough United	2021–22	Championship	27	1	2	0	0	0	—		29	1
Peterborough United	2022–23	League One	34	1	2	0	1	0	3 (Note: Two appearances in EFL Trophy, one appearance in League One play-offs)	0	40	1
Peterborough United	Total		115	4	8	0	2	0	6	0	131	4
Stevenage	2023–24	League One	26	0	1	1	2	0	2	0	31	1
Stevenage	2024–25	League One	15	0	1	0	1	0	3	0	20	0
Stevenage	Total		41	0	2	1	3	0	5	0	51	1
Milton Keynes Dons	2024–25	League Two	2	0	—		—		—		2	0
Milton Keynes Dons	2025–26	League Two	5	0	1	0	1	0	2	0	9	0
Milton Keynes Dons	Total		7	0	1	0	1	0	2	0	11	0
Career total			397	8	18	1	14	0	29	1	458	10

== Honours ==
Swindon Town

- EFL League Two: 2011–12

Portsmouth

- EFL Trophy: 2018–19

Peterborough United

- EFL League One runner-up: 2020–21

Milton Keynes Dons

- EFL League Two runner-up: 2025–26

Individual

- Swindon Town Player of the Season: 2012–13, 2013–14
