= Matty Jones =

English footballer

Personal information
- Full name: Mathew Ryan Jones
- Date of birth: 30 November 1995 (age 30)
- Place of birth: Swindon, England
- Position: Defender

Team information
- Current team: Whitehawk

Youth career
- 2012–2014: Swindon Town

Senior career*
Years	Team	Apps	(Gls)
2014–2015	Swindon Town	1	(0)
2014	→ Swindon Supermarine (loan)	8	(1)
2014	→ Wantage Town (loan)	6	(4)
2014	→ Chippenham Town (loan)	3	(0)
2014-2015	→ Farnborough (loan)	7	(0)
2015–2017	Chippenham Town	80	(5)
2017	Cirencester Town	9	(0)
2017–2018	Farnborough	20	(0)
2018–2020	Hungerford Town	57	(6)
2020–2021	Weston-super-Mare	4	(0)
2021-2022	Hungerford Town		
2022	Chippenham Town		
2022-2023	Royal Wootton Bassett		
2023-2024	Corsham Town		
2024-2025	Melksham Town		
2025-2026	Bognor Regis Town		
2026-	Whitehawk	9	(0)
- * Club domestic league appearances and goals as of 19:56 24 October 2026 (UTC)

Mathew Ryan Jones (born 30 November 1995) is an English footballer who currently plays for Whitehawk.

== Playing career ==
Jones came through the youth system of his hometown club, Swindon Town, where he signed as an 11-year-old. In March 2014, Jones was sent on a work experience loan to Swindon Supermarine but he returned to his parent club and made his professional football debut on the final day of the 2013–14 season as a second-half substitute against Rotherham United.

Jones joined Chippenham Town following his release by Swindon Town and played in their promotion winning side to National League South in 2017, before leaving for Cirencester Town, and then Farnborough.

Hungerford Town signed Jones ahead of the 2018 season. He left briefly for Weston-super-Mare, before returning to The Crusaders. Jones played the 2021-2022 season with Hungerford Town, re-joining Chippenham Town for the start of the 2022-2023 season.

Jones then signed for Royal Wootton Bassett Town in October 2022, scoring 17 goals in 28 appearances in his first season with the club.

Jones signed for Corsham Town in October 2023.

Jones signed for Melksham Town in July 2024.

In June 2025 Jones joined Bognor Regis Town.

In June 2026 Jones signed for Brighton-based Isthmian Premier Division side Whitehawk.

== Career statistics ==
Appearances and goals by club, season and competition
Club	Season	League			National Cup		League Cup		Other		Total	
Club	Season	Division	Apps	Goals	Apps	Goals	Apps	Goals	Apps	Goals	Apps	Goals
Swindon Town	2012–13	League One	0	0	0	0	0	0	0	0	0	0
Swindon Town	2013–14	League One	1	0	0	0	0	0	0	0	1	0
Swindon Town	2014–15	League One	0	0	0	0	0	0	0	0	0	0
Swindon Town	Total		1	0	0	0	0	0	0	0	1	0
Swindon Supermarine (loan)	2014	Division One South & West	8	0	0	0	0	0	0	0	8	0
Wantage Town (loan)	2014	Division One South & West	1	0	0	0	0	0	0	0	1	0
Career total			10	0	0	0	0	0	0	0	10	0

== Personal life ==
Father Tom Jones made over 200 appearances for Swindon Town in the late 80s and early 90s. Since January 2025 Jones has been a full-time sports teacher with Premier League team Brighton & Hove Albion.
