= Cameron Belford =

English footballer

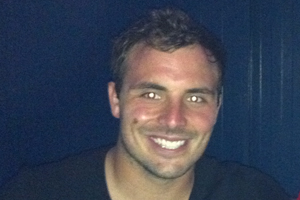
- Belford in 2013

Personal information
- Full name: Cameron Dale Belford
- Date of birth: 16 October 1988 (age 38)
- Place of birth: Nuneaton, England
- Position: Goalkeeper

Team information
- Current team: Coleshill Town

Youth career
- –2006: Coventry City

Senior career*
Years	Team	Apps	(Gls)
2006–2007	Coventry City	0	(0)
2006	→ Tamworth (loan)	1	(0)
2007–2013	Bury	78	(0)
2007–2008	→ Worcester City (loan)	22	(0)
2012	→ Southend United (loan)	13	(0)
2012	→ Southend United (loan)	4	(0)
2012–2013	→ Accrington Stanley (loan)	5	(0)
2013–2014	Tamworth	46	(0)
2014	Mansfield Town	0	(0)
2014–2015	Rushall Olympic	25	(0)
2015	Swindon Town	1	(0)
2015–2016	Wrexham	19	(0)
2016	→ Stranraer (loan)	16	(0)
2016–2018	Stranraer	58	(0)
2018	Forest Green Rovers	0	(0)
2018	Chorley	2	(0)
2018–2020	Nuneaton Borough	34	(0)
2019–2020	→ FC United of Manchester (loan)	20	(0)
2020–2022	Radcliffe	37	(1)
2022–2025	Stafford Rangers	111	(0)
2025–	Coleshill Town	0	(0)
- * Club domestic league appearances and goals as of 16:11, 21 May 2025 (UTC)

Cameron Dale Belford (born 16 October 1988) is an English semi-professional footballer who plays as a goalkeeper for Northern Premier League Division One Midlands club Coleshill Town.

== Playing career ==
=== Early career ===
Born in Nuneaton, Warwickshire, Belford started his career at Coventry City and had a brief loan spell at Conference National side Tamworth during the 2006–07 season playing one game against Morecambe, where Tamworth lost 1–0, his father Dale was on the substitutes' bench as back up goalkeeper. Belford returned to Coventry soon after the match and was assigned squad number 43, but was released by City in May 2007, without having made a first team appearance.

=== Bury ===
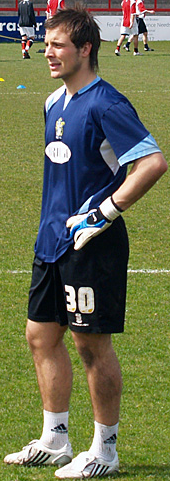
Belford warming up for Bury in 2008

In August 2007, Belford joined League Two side Bury on a one-year contract after a short trial at Kettering Town. With a lack of first team opportunities at Gigg Lane, Belford joined Conference North team Worcester City on loan for a month on 30 November, becoming one of Richard Dryden's first signings. He made his City debut on 2 December against Barrow at St George's Lane; the game was drawn 1–1. After impressing in the following games his loan spell with Worcester was extended until the end of the season. His impressive form continued for City and he won the club's player of the month award for March. In April 2008, Bury manager Alan Knill offered Belford a contract for the 2008–09 season. and he was recalled from his loan spell at the same time. He appeared in 22 league and 2 cup games for Worcester City.

On 3 May 2008, Belford made his debut as a 75th-minute substitute against Accrington Stanley at the Crown Ground replacing Jim Provett with Bury winning the game 2–0. In October 2009 Belford impressed many against Rotherham United when he came on after 27 minutes into the first half when first team goalkeeper Wayne Brown came off injured. He made a number of fine saves and denied Ian Sharps from scoring a late equalizer. He kept the score down to 2–1 to Bury.

In the 2010–11 season he had established a number one goalkeeper spot after some fine performances in the latter part of the season before.

Belford scored his first goal for Bury in a penalty shoot out in a EFL Trophy tie against Shrewsbury Town after calmly saving a Danny O'Donnell spot kick and slotting home the next kick himself. The shootout finished 6–5 to Bury. On 23 October 2010 during a League Two game against Southend United Belford suffered a serious facial injury in a collision with an opposition forward. The injury was a fractured cheek bone so manager Alan Knill brought in Owain Fon Williams to replace Belford. On 25 April 2011, Belford played and helped Bury gain promotion to League One in a 3–2 win at Chesterfield, during which he was victim of an assault on his problem cheekbone from a Chesterfield youth during a pitch invasion after Chesterfield's equalising second goal. On 3 March 2012, Belford joined League Two side Southend United on a one-month loan as cover for Glenn Morris. During that spell he helped the Shrimpers reach the League Two play-offs but was unable to help them progress beyond the semi-final stage.

On 14 August 2012, Belford returned to Southend for a second loan spell. He was brought in as Southend had no first choice goalkeeper prior to their League Cup fixture against Peterborough United. However, he made only 3 appearances after Southend signed Paul Smith to be their first choice goalkeeper. Once his loan spell finished, he returned to Bury, but ironically the next week Smith was injured in a match against Gillingham. Belford declined the opportunity to return to Southend for a third loan spell.

In late-December, Belford joined Accrington Stanley on a seven-day emergency loan deal, following Ian Dunbavin's injury and a cover for Paul Rachubka.

On 27 March 2015 Belford announced on social media website Twitter that he had joined Swindon Town for the remainder of the 2014–15 season. He only made 1 appearance for Swindon, being substituted on 3 May 2015 after his brother, Tyrell Belford, was sent off.

=== Wrexham ===
On 27 May 2015, Belford signed a one-year deal with Wrexham. After making 19 appearances for Wrexham, Belford lost his place to on loan goalkeeper Rhys Taylor, after the Dragons were knocked out of the FA Cup by National League North side Gainsborough Trinity In January 2016, Belford moved on loan to Scottish League One side Stranraer in order to gain regular football. His first appearance for the Blues came in a 2–0 league victory against Cowdenbeath.

=== Stranraer ===
After being released by Wrexham, Belford returned to Stair Park to sign a permanent contract with Stranraer in June 2016.

=== Forest Green Rovers ===
Belford returned to England in January 2018, signing for EFL League Two club Forest Green Rovers on short-term deal until the end of the 2017–18 season.

He was released by Forest Green at the end of the 2017–18 season.

=== Chorley ===
He then joined Chorley. He played in the opening two league matches of the season but left the club in search of first team football after losing his place.

=== Nuneaton Borough ===
He later signed for Nuneaton Borough.

On 21 September 2019, he joined FC United of Manchester on loan for one month. The loan was extended until the end of November and again until the end of January 2020.

=== Radcliffe ===
On 16 June 2020, Belford joined Northern Premier League Premier Division side Radcliffe, linking up once again with manager Lee Fowler, who he had worked with at Nuneaton. He made his league debut for the club on 19 September in a 4–2 defeat against Buxton. In October, due to the ongoing COVID-19 pandemic, semi-professional leagues across the United Kingdom were curtailed. Prior to the season being curtailed, Belford made 11 appearances in all competitions for Radcliffe.

=== Stafford Rangers ===
In June 2022, Belford joined Stafford Rangers.

=== Coleshill Town ===
In May 2025, Belford joined Northern Premier League Division One Midlands side Coleshill Town.

== Club statistics ==
As of end of 2024–25 season

Appearances and goals by club, season and competition
Club	Season	League			National Cup		League Cup		Other		Total	
Club	Season	Division	Apps	Goals	Apps	Goals	Apps	Goals	Apps	Goals	Apps	Goals
Coventry City	2006–07	Championship	0	0	0	0	0	0	0	0	0	0
Tamworth (loan)	2006–07	Conference National	1	0	0	0	—		0	0	1	0
Bury	2007–08	League Two	1	0	0	0	0	0	0	0	1	0
Bury	2008–09	League Two	1	0	0	0	0	0	0	0	1	0
Bury	2009–10	League Two	8	0	0	0	0	0	1 (Note: Appearances in the Football League Trophy)	0	9	0
Bury	2010–11	League Two	39	0	0	0	1	0	1	0	41	0
Bury	2011–12	League One	23	0	1	0	2	0	1	0	27	0
Bury	2012–13	League One	7	0	0	0	0	0	0	0	7	0
Bury	Total		79	0	1	0	3	0	3	0	86	0
Southend United (loan)	2011–12|	League Two	13	0	0	0	0	0	2 (Note: Appearances in the League Two play-offs)	0	15	0
Southend United (loan)	2012–13	League Two	4	0	0	0	1	0	0	0	5	0
Accrington Stanley (loan)	2012–13	League Two	5	0	0	0	0	0	0	0	5	0
Tamworth	2013–14	Conference Premier	46	0	3	0	—		4 (Note: Appearances in the FA Trophy)	0	53	0
Mansfield Town	2014–15	League Two	0	0	0	0	0	0	0	0	0	0
Rushall Olympic	2014–15	NPL – Premier Division	25	0	0	0	—		0	0	25	0
Swindon Town	2015–16	League One	1	0	0	0	0	0	0	0	1	0
Wrexham	2015–16	National League	19	0	0	0	—		0	0	19	0
Stranraer (loan)	2015–16	Scottish League One	16	0	0	0	0	0	4 (Note: Appearances in the Scottish Championship play-offs)	0	20	0
Stranraer	2016–17	Scottish League One	36	0	2	0	2	0	3 (Note: Appearances in the Scottish Challenge Cup)	0	43	0
Stranraer	2017–18	Scottish League One	22	0	1	0	2	0	2	0	27	0
Stranraer	Total		74	0	3	0	4	0	5	0	70	0
Forest Green Rovers	2017–18	League Two	0	0	0	0	0	0	0	0	0	0
Radcliffe	2020-21	Northern Premier League; Premier Division	8	0	2 (Note: Appearances in the FA Cup Qualifying rounds)	0	0	0	1	0	11	0
Radcliffe	2021-22	Northern Premier League; Premier Division	29	1	3	0	0	0	4	0	36	1
Radcliffe	Total	Northern Premier League; Premier Division	37	1	5	0	0	0	5	0	47	1
Stafford Rangers	2022–23	Northern Premier League Premier Division	42	0	1	0	—		4 (Note: Two appearances in FA Trophy, two appearances in Staffordshire Senior Cup)	0	47	0
Stafford Rangers	2023–24	Northern Premier League Premier Division	38	0	1	0	—		3	0	42	0
Stafford Rangers	2024–25	Northern Premier League Division One West	31	0	2	0	—		4 (Note: Three appearances in FA Trophy, one appearance in Staffordshire Senior Cup)	0	37	0
Stafford Rangers	Total		111	0	4	0	0	0	11	0	126	0
Career total			415	1	16	0	8	0	34	0	473	1

== Personal life ==
He is the son of Tamworth goalkeeper Dale Belford and the brother of former Swindon Town goalkeeper Tyrell Belford.
