= Lee Marshall (footballer, born 1997) =

English footballer

Personal information
- Full name: Lee James Marshall
- Date of birth: 21 November 1996 (age 29)
- Place of birth: Gloucester, England
- Position: Midfielder

Team information
- Current team: North Leigh

Youth career
- 2004–2014: Swindon Town

Senior career*
Years	Team	Apps	(Gls)
2014–2016	Swindon Town	4	(0)
2016–2017	Bath City	15	(1)
2017	Swindon Supermarine	9	(1)
2017–	North Leigh	1	(0)
- * Club domestic league appearances and goals as of 23:24, 18 December 2017 (UTC)

Lee James Marshall (born 21 November 1997) is an English footballer who last played as a midfielder for North Leigh.

== Playing career ==
Lee Marshall was first recognised as a youngster at his local Junior School Innsworth in a school football game against Churchdown Village Juniors. Marshall became a scholar at Swindon Town in the summer of 2013. Marshall made his professional football debut as a late substitute in the League Cup First Round tie against Luton Town.

In July 2016, Marshall joined Bath City.

== Career statistics ==
As of match played 18 November 2017.

Club	Season	League			FA Cup		EFL Cup		Other		Total	
Club	Season	Division	Apps	Goals	Apps	Goals	Apps	Goals	Apps	Goals	Apps	Goals
Swindon Town	2014–15	League One	2	0	0	0	1	0	0	0	3	0
Swindon Town	2015–16	League One	2	0	0	0	0	0	1 (Note: Appearance(s) in Football League Trophy)	0	3	0
Swindon Town	Total		4	0	0	0	1	0	1	0	6	0
Bath City	2016–17	National League South	15	1	2	0	—		0	0	17	1
Swindon Supermarine	2017–18	Southern Football League Division One West	9	1	4	0	—		2 (Note: Appearance(s) in FA Trophy)	0	15	1
North Leigh	2017–18	Southern Football League Division One West	1	0	—		—		0	0	1	0
Career total			29	2	6	0	1	0	3	0	39	2
