= 2014–15 Football League One =

Football League One
- Season: 2014–15
- Champions: Bristol City (4th divisional title)
- Promoted: Bristol City; Milton Keynes Dons; Preston North End
- Relegated: Notts County; Crawley Town; Leyton Orient; Yeovil Town
- Matches: 552
- Goals: 1,464 (2.65 per match)
- Top goalscorer: Joe Garner (25 goals)
- Biggest home win: Milton Keynes Dons 7–0 Oldham Athletic (20 December 2014)
- Biggest away win: Bradford City 0–6 Bristol City (14 April 2015)
- Highest scoring: Bristol City 8–2 Walsall (3 May 2015)
- Longest winning run: 7 games Preston North End
- Longest unbeaten run: 18 games Preston North End
- Longest winless run: 13 games Crawley Town
- Longest losing run: 6 games Port Vale; Yeovil Town
- Highest attendance: 27,306; Coventry City 1–0 Gillingham (5 September 2014)
- Lowest attendance: 1,905; Crawley Town 1–0 Fleetwood Town (13 September 2014)
- Total attendance: 3,843,176
- Average attendance: 7,025

The 2014–15 Football League One (referred to as the Sky Bet League One for sponsorship reasons) was the eleventh season of the Football League One under its current title and the twenty-second season under its current league division format. The season began on 9 August 2014.

Bristol City won the league to return to the Championship after a two-year absence. They were unbeaten for the first 16 matches of the season and also finished with the best goal difference and best defence. MK Dons pipped Preston North End to 2nd place on the last day of the season after the Lancashire club lost at Colchester. But Preston were eventually promoted via the playoffs, defeating Chesterfield and Swindon 4–0 (on aggregate) and 4–0 respectively.

At the other end of the table, Yeovil Town followed their relegation from the Championship the previous season with another relegation. Leyton Orient were relegated after having contested the playoff final in 2013–14 (which they lost to Rotherham on penalties after being 2–0 up), and Crawley and Notts County were the final teams relegated to League Two for the 2015–16 season.

== Changes from last season ==
=== Team changes ===
The following teams have changed division since the 2013–14 season.

==== To League One ====
Promoted from League Two

- Chesterfield
- Scunthorpe United
- Rochdale
- Fleetwood Town

Relegated from Championship

- Doncaster Rovers
- Barnsley
- Yeovil Town

==== From League One ====
Relegated to League Two

- Tranmere Rovers
- Carlisle United
- Shrewsbury Town
- Stevenage

Promoted to Championship

- Wolverhampton Wanderers
- Brentford
- Rotherham United

== Team overview ==
=== Stadia and locations ===
Locations of teams in the 2014–2015 Football League One

Team	Location	Stadium	Capacity
Barnsley	Barnsley	Oakwell	23,009
Bradford City	Bradford	Valley Parade	25,136
Bristol City	Bristol	Ashton Gate	21,497
Chesterfield	Chesterfield	Proact Stadium	10,504
Colchester United	Colchester	Colchester Community Stadium	10,064
Coventry City	Coventry	Ricoh Arena	32,609
Crawley Town	Crawley	Broadfield Stadium	5,996
Crewe Alexandra	Crewe	Alexandra Stadium	10,153
Doncaster Rovers	Doncaster	Keepmoat Stadium	15,231
Fleetwood Town	Fleetwood	Highbury Stadium	5,327
Gillingham	Gillingham	Priestfield Stadium	11,582
Leyton Orient	London (Leyton)	Brisbane Road	9,271
Milton Keynes Dons	Milton Keynes	Stadium mk	30,500
Notts County	Nottingham	Meadow Lane	21,388
Oldham Athletic	Oldham	Boundary Park	10,638
Peterborough United	Peterborough	Abax Stadium	16,315
Port Vale	Stoke-on-Trent	Vale Park	19,052
Preston North End	Preston	Deepdale	23,408
Rochdale	Rochdale	Spotland Stadium	10,249
Scunthorpe United	Scunthorpe	Glanford Park	9,088
Sheffield United	Sheffield	Bramall Lane	32,702
Swindon Town	Swindon	County Ground	15,728
Walsall	Walsall	Bescot Stadium	11,300
Yeovil Town	Yeovil	Huish Park	9,565

=== Managerial changes ===
Team	Outgoing manager	Manner of departure	Date of vacancy	Position in table at time of departure	Incoming manager	Date of appointment
Colchester United	Joe Dunne	Sacked	1 September 2014	23rd	Tony Humes	1 September 2014
Port Vale	Micky Adams	Resigned	18 September 2014	23rd	Rob Page	29 October 2014
Leyton Orient	Russell Slade	Resigned	24 September 2014	17th	Mauro Milanese	26 October 2014
Scunthorpe United	Russ Wilcox	Sacked	8 October 2014	23rd	Mark Robins	13 October 2014
Leyton Orient	Mauro Milanese	Sacked	8 December 2014	19th	Fabio Liverani	8 December 2014
Crawley Town	John Gregory	Health Reasons	27 December 2014	21st	Dean Saunders	27 December 2014
Gillingham	Peter Taylor	Sacked	31 December 2014	20th	Justin Edinburgh	7 February 2015
Yeovil Town	Gary Johnson	Sacked	4 February 2015	24th	Terry Skiverton	4 February 2015
Barnsley	Danny Wilson	Sacked	12 February 2015	17th	Lee Johnson	25 February 2015
Peterborough United	Darren Ferguson	Sacked	22 February 2015	15th		
Coventry City	Steven Pressley	Sacked	22 February 2015	21st	Tony Mowbray	3 March 2015
Oldham Athletic	Lee Johnson	Signed by Barnsley	25 February 2015	9th		
Notts County	Shaun Derry	Sacked	23 March 2015	20th	Ricardo Moniz	7 April 2015
Yeovil Town	Terry Skiverton	Demotion to Assistant Manager	9 April 2015	24th	Paul Sturrock	9 April 2015

== League table ==
Pos	Team	Pld	W	D	L	GF	GA	GD	Pts	Promotion, qualification or relegation
1	Bristol City (C, P)	46	29	12	5	96	38	+58	99	Promotion to Football League Championship
2	Milton Keynes Dons (P)	46	27	10	9	101	44	+57	91	Promotion to Football League Championship
3	Preston North End (O, P)	46	25	14	7	79	40	+39	89	Qualification for League One play-offs (Note: Four teams play for one spot and promotion to Football League Championship.)
4	Swindon Town	46	23	10	13	76	57	+19	79	Qualification for League One play-offs
5	Sheffield United	46	19	14	13	66	53	+13	71	Qualification for League One play-offs
6	Chesterfield	46	19	12	15	68	55	+13	69	Qualification for League One play-offs
7	Bradford City	46	17	14	15	55	55	0	65	
8	Rochdale	46	19	6	21	72	66	+6	63	
9	Peterborough United	46	18	9	19	53	56	−3	63	
10	Fleetwood Town	46	17	12	17	49	52	−3	63	
11	Barnsley	46	17	11	18	62	61	+1	62	
12	Gillingham	46	16	14	16	65	66	−1	62	
13	Doncaster Rovers	46	16	13	17	58	62	−4	61	
14	Walsall	46	14	17	15	50	54	−4	59	
15	Oldham Athletic	46	14	15	17	54	67	−13	57	
16	Scunthorpe United	46	14	14	18	62	75	−13	56	
17	Coventry City	46	13	16	17	49	60	−11	55	
18	Port Vale	46	15	9	22	55	65	−10	54	
19	Colchester United	46	14	10	22	58	77	−19	52	
20	Crewe Alexandra	46	14	10	22	43	75	−32	52	
21	Notts County (R)	46	12	14	20	45	63	−18	50	Relegation to Football League Two
22	Crawley Town (R)	46	13	11	22	53	79	−26	50	Relegation to Football League Two
23	Leyton Orient (R)	46	12	13	21	59	69	−10	49	Relegation to Football League Two
24	Yeovil Town (R)	46	10	10	26	36	75	−39	40	Relegation to Football League Two

Updated to match(es) played on 3 May 2015. Source: BBC Sport
Rules for classification: 1) Points; 2) Goal difference; 3) Number of goals scored
(C) Champions; (O) Play-off winners; (P) Promoted; (R) Relegated

== Play-offs ==
Semifinals
3	Preston North End	1	3	4
6	Chesterfield	0	0	0
4	Swindon Town	2	5	7
5	Sheffield United	1	5	6

Final
3	Preston North End	4
4	Swindon Town	0

== Results ==
Home \ Away	BAR	BRA	BRI	CHF	COL	COV	CRA	CRE	DON	FLE	GIL	LEY	MKD	NTC	OLD	PET	PTV	PNE	ROC	SCU	SHU	SWI	WAL	YEO
Barnsley		3–1	2–2	1–1	3–2	1–0	0–1	2–0	1–1	1–2	4–1	2–0	3–5	2–3	1–0	1–1	2–1	1–1	5–0	1–2	0–2	0–3	3–0	2–0
Bradford City	1–0		0–6	0–1	1–1	3–2	1–0	2–0	1–2	2–2	1–1	3–1	2–1	1–0	2–0	0–1	1–1	0–3	1–2	1–1	0–2	1–2	1–1	1–3
Bristol City	2–2	2–2		3–2	2–1	0–0	1–0	3–0	3–0	2–0	0–0	0–0	3–2	4–0	1–0	2–0	3–1	0–1	1–0	2–0	1–3	3–0	8–2	2–1
Chesterfield	2–1	0–1	0–2		6–0	2–3	3–0	1–0	2–2	3–0	3–0	2–3	0–1	1–1	1–1	3–2	3–0	0–2	2–1	4–1	3–2	0–3	1–0	0–0
Colchester United	3–1	0–0	3–2	2–1		0–1	2–3	2–3	0–1	2–1	1–2	2–0	0–1	0–1	2–2	1–3	1–2	1–0	1–4	2–2	2–3	1–1	0–2	2–0
Coventry City	2–2	1–1	1–3	0–0	1–0		2–2	1–3	1–3	1–1	1–0	0–1	2–1	0–1	1–1	3–2	2–3	0–2	2–2	1–1	1–0	0–3	0–0	2–1
Crawley Town	5–1	1–3	1–2	1–1	0–0	1–2		1–1	0–5	1–0	1–2	1–0	2–2	2–0	2–0	1–4	1–2	2–1	0–4	2–2	1–1	1–0	1–0	2–0
Crewe Alexandra	1–2	0–1	1–0	0–0	0–3	2–1	0–0		1–1	2–0	3–1	1–1	0–5	0–3	0–1	1–0	2–1	1–1	2–5	2–0	0–1	0–0	1–1	1–0
Doncaster Rovers	1–0	0–3	1–3	3–2	2–0	2–0	0–0	2–1		0–0	1–2	0–2	0–0	0–0	0–2	0–2	1–3	1–1	1–1	5–2	0–1	1–2	0–2	3–0
Fleetwood Town	0–0	0–2	3–3	0–0	2–3	0–2	1–0	2–1	3–1		1–0	1–1	0–3	2–1	0–2	1–1	1–0	1–1	1–0	2–2	1–1	2–2	0–1	4–0
Gillingham	0–1	1–0	1–3	2–3	2–2	3–1	1–1	2–0	1–1	0–1		3–2	4–2	3–1	3–2	2–1	2–2	0–1	1–0	0–3	2–0	2–2	0–0	2–0
Leyton Orient	0–0	0–2	1–3	1–2	0–2	2–2	4–1	4–1	0–1	0–1	3–3		0–0	0–1	3–0	1–2	3–1	0–2	2–3	1–4	1–1	1–2	0–0	3–0
Milton Keynes Dons	2–0	1–2	0–0	1–2	6–0	0–0	2–0	6–1	3–0	2–1	4–2	6–1		4–1	7–0	3–0	1–0	0–2	2–2	2–0	1–0	2–1	0–3	5–1
Notts County	1–1	1–1	1–2	0–1	2–1	0–0	5–3	2–1	2–1	0–1	1–0	1–1	0–1		0–0	1–2	0–1	1–3	1–2	2–2	1–2	0–3	1–2	1–2
Oldham Athletic	1–3	2–1	1–1	0–0	0–1	4–1	1–1	1–2	2–2	1–0	0–0	1–3	1–3	3–0		1–1	1–1	0–4	3–0	3–2	2–2	2–1	2–1	0–4
Peterborough United	2–1	2–0	0–3	1–0	0–2	0–1	4–3	1–1	0–0	1–0	1–2	1–0	3–2	0–0	2–2		3–1	0–1	2–1	1–2	1–2	1–2	0–0	1–0
Port Vale	2–1	2–2	0–3	1–2	1–2	0–2	2–3	0–1	3–0	1–2	2–1	3–0	0–0	0–2	0–1	2–1		2–2	1–0	2–2	2–1	0–1	1–1	4–1
Preston North End	1–0	1–2	1–1	3–3	4–2	1–0	2–0	5–1	2–2	3–2	2–2	2–2	1–1	1–1	1–0	2–0	2–0		1–0	2–0	1–1	3–0	1–0	1–1
Rochdale	0–1	0–2	1–1	1–0	2–1	1–0	4–1	4–0	1–3	0–2	1–1	1–0	2–3	2–2	0–3	0–1	1–0	3–0		3–1	1–2	2–4	4–0	2–1
Scunthorpe United	0–1	1–1	0–2	2–0	1–1	2–1	2–1	2–1	1–2	0–2	2–1	1–2	1–1	0–1	0–1	2–0	1–1	0–4	2–1		1–1	3–1	2–1	1–1
Sheffield United	0–1	1–1	1–2	1–1	4–1	2–2	1–0	1–2	3–2	1–2	2–1	2–2	0–1	1–1	1–1	1–2	1–0	2–1	1–0	4–0		2–0	1–1	2–0
Swindon Town	2–0	2–1	1–0	3–1	2–2	1–1	1–2	2–0	0–1	1–0	0–3	2–2	0–3	3–0	2–2	1–0	1–0	1–0	2–3	3–1	5–2		3–3	0–1
Walsall	3–1	0–0	1–1	1–0	0–0	0–2	5–0	0–1	3–0	1–0	1–1	0–2	1–1	0–0	2–0	0–0	0–1	3–1	3–2	1–4	1–1	1–4		1–2
Yeovil Town	1–1	1–0	0–3	2–3	0–1	0–0	2–1	1–1	0–3	0–1	2–2	0–3	0–2	1–1	2–1	1–0	1–2	0–2	0–3	1–1	1–0	1–1	0–1	

Updated to match(es) played on 3 May 2015. Source: BBC Sport
Legend: Blue = home team win; Yellow = draw; Red = away team win.

== Top scorers ==
As of 3 May 2015

Rank	Player	Club	Goals
1	(England) Joe Garner	Preston North End	25
2	(England) Ian Henderson	Rochdale	22
3	(Republic of Ireland) Eoin Doyle	Chesterfield	21
3	(England) Andy Williams	Swindon Town	21
5	(Northern Ireland) Will Grigg	Milton Keynes Dons	20
6	(England) Izale McLeod	Crawley Town	19
7	(England) Aaron Wilbraham	Bristol City	18
8	(Wales) Tom Bradshaw	Walsall	17
8	(England) Matt Done	Rochdale/Sheffield United	17
10	(England) Dele Alli	Milton Keynes Dons	16
10	(England) Cody McDonald	Gillingham	16
