= 2015–16 Football League Championship =

Football League Championship
- Season: 2015–16
- Champions: Burnley; 1st Championship title 3rd 2nd tier title
- Promoted: Burnley; Middlesbrough; Hull City
- Relegated: Bolton Wanderers; Milton Keynes Dons; Charlton Athletic
- Matches: 552
- Goals: 1,337 (2.42 per match)
- Top goalscorer: Andre Gray (Brentford)/(Burnley) (25 goals)
- Biggest home win: Hull City 6–0 Charlton Athletic (16 January 2016); Bristol City 6–0 Bolton Wanderers (19 March 2016)
- Biggest away win: Milton Keynes Dons 0–5 Burnley (12 January 2016)
- Highest scoring: Queens Park Rangers 4–3 Bolton Wanderers (3 October 2015); Fulham 2–5 Birmingham City (7 November 2015); Rotherham United 2–5 Ipswich Town (7 November 2015)
- Longest winning run: 6 matches Burnley; Middlesbrough
- Longest unbeaten run: 23 matches Burnley
- Longest winless run: 17 matches Bolton Wanderers
- Longest losing run: 6 matches Bolton Wanderers
- Highest attendance: 33,806; Middlesbrough 1–1 Brighton & Hove Albion (7 May 2016)
- Lowest attendance: 8,363; Brentford 2–1 Cardiff City (19 April 2016)
- Total attendance: 9,703,004
- Average attendance: 17,578

The 2015–16 Football League Championship (referred to as the Sky Bet Championship for sponsorship reasons) was the twelfth season of the Football League Championship under its current title and it was the twenty-fourth season under its current league structure. The season started on 7 August 2015, and concluded on 7 May 2016. The fixtures were announced on 17 June 2015.

== Teams ==
A total of 24 teams contested the league, including 18 sides from the 2014–15 season, three relegated from the 2014–15 Premier League and three promoted from the 2014–15 Football League One.

=== Team changes ===
The following teams changed division after the 2014–15 season. Blackpool were relegated on 6 April after Rotherham United won against Brighton & Hove Albion. Bristol City secured promotion to the Championship on 14 April after beating Bradford City 6–0. Watford secured promotion to the Premier League on 25 April. Rotherham United won against Reading on 28 April to also send Millwall and Wigan Athletic to League One. Bournemouth secured promotion to the Premier League on the final day on 2 May against Charlton Athletic and won the 2014–15 Football League Championship after Watford slipped up against Sheffield Wednesday. Milton Keynes Dons secured promotion to the Championship after beating Yeovil Town 5–1 after Preston North End slipped up against Colchester United. On 9 May, Burnley became the first team to be relegated from the Premier League despite winning away 1–0 against Hull City as results on the day went against them. On 10 May, Queens Park Rangers were the second team to be relegated from the Premier League after suffering a 6–0 defeat to Manchester City. On 24 May 2015, Hull City were the 3rd and final team to be relegated from the Premier League, finishing 18th in the Premier League. On the same day Preston North End achieved promotion at Wembley via the play-offs. On 25 May 2015, Norwich City won the playoff final, and were promoted to the Premier League.

==== To Championship ====
Promoted from League One

- Bristol City
- Milton Keynes Dons
- Preston North End

Relegated from Premier League

- Hull City
- Burnley
- Queens Park Rangers

==== From Championship ====
Relegated to League One

- Millwall
- Wigan Athletic
- Blackpool

Promoted to Premier League

- Bournemouth
- Watford
- Norwich City

== Map ==
=== Stadia and locations ===
Locations of teams in the 2015–2016 Football League Championship
Greater London Championship football clubs

Team	Location	Stadium	Capacity
Birmingham City	Birmingham	St Andrew's	30,016
Blackburn Rovers	Blackburn	Ewood Park	31,367
Bolton Wanderers	Bolton	Macron Stadium	28,723
Brentford	London (Brentford)	Griffin Park	12,300
Brighton & Hove Albion	Brighton	Falmer Stadium	30,750
Bristol City	Bristol	Ashton Gate	16,600
Burnley	Burnley	Turf Moor	21,401
Cardiff City	Cardiff	Cardiff City Stadium	33,280
Charlton Athletic	London (Charlton)	The Valley	27,111
Derby County	Derby	iPro Stadium	33,597
Fulham	London (Fulham)	Craven Cottage	25,700
Huddersfield Town	Huddersfield	John Smith's Stadium	24,500
Hull City	Kingston upon Hull	KC Stadium	25,400
Ipswich Town	Ipswich	Portman Road	30,311
Leeds United	Leeds	Elland Road	37,914
Middlesbrough	Middlesbrough	Riverside Stadium	34,742
Milton Keynes Dons	Milton Keynes	Stadium:mk	30,500
Nottingham Forest	Nottingham	City Ground	30,576
Preston North End	Preston	Deepdale	23,404
Queens Park Rangers	London (White City)	Loftus Road	18,439
Reading	Reading	Madejski Stadium	24,161
Rotherham United	Rotherham	New York Stadium	12,021
Sheffield Wednesday	Sheffield	Hillsborough	39,732
Wolverhampton Wanderers	Wolverhampton	Molineux	31,700

=== Personnel and sponsoring ===
Team	Manager (Note: According to current revision of List of English Football League managers)	Captain	Kit manufacturer	Sponsor
Birmingham City	(England) Gary Rowett	(England) Paul Robinson	Carbrini	EZE Group
Blackburn Rovers	(Republic of Ireland) Owen Coyle	(Scotland) Grant Hanley	Nike	Dafabet
Bolton Wanderers	(England) Phil Parkinson	(England) Darren Pratley	Macron	ROK Mobile
Brentford	(England) Dean Smith	(England) Jake Bidwell	Adidas	Matchbook.com
Brighton & Hove Albion	(Republic of Ireland) Chris Hughton	(Scotland) Gordon Greer	Nike	American Express
Bristol City	(England) Lee Johnson	(England) Aaron Wilbraham	Bristol Sport	RSG
Burnley	(England) Sean Dyche	(England) Tom Heaton	Puma	Oak Furniture Land (home), Sofastore.com (away)
Cardiff City	(Wales) Paul Trollope	(Scotland) David Marshall	Adidas	Visit Malaysia
Charlton Athletic	(England) Russell Slade	(England) Johnnie Jackson	Nike	University of Greenwich (front); Andrews Sykes (back), Mitsubishi Electric (shorts)
Derby County	(England) Nigel Pearson	(Republic of Ireland) Richard Keogh	Umbro	JUST EAT
Fulham	(Serbia) Slaviša Jokanović	(England) Scott Parker	Adidas	Visit Florida
Huddersfield Town	(United States) David Wagner	(England) Mark Hudson	Puma	PURE Legal (home), RadianB (away), Cavonia (third)
Hull City	(England) Steve Bruce	(England) Michael Dawson	Umbro	Flamingo Land
Ipswich Town	(Republic of Ireland) Mick McCarthy	(England) Luke Chambers	Adidas	Marcus Evans
Leeds United	(Scotland) Steve Evans	(Ivory Coast) Sol Bamba	Kappa	No sponsor
Middlesbrough	(Spain) Aitor Karanka	(England) Grant Leadbitter	Adidas	Ramsdens
Milton Keynes Dons	(England) Karl Robinson	(England) Dean Lewington	Erreà	Suzuki
Nottingham Forest	(France) Philippe Montanier	(England) Chris Cohen	Adidas	Fawaz International Refrigeration & Air Conditioning Company
Preston North End	(England) Simon Grayson	(England) Tom Clarke	Nike	Virgin Trains
Queens Park Rangers	(Netherlands) Jimmy Floyd Hasselbaink	(England) Nedum Onuoha	Nike	AirAsia (front), Smarkets (back)
Reading	(Netherlands) Jaap Stam	(Republic of Ireland) Paul McShane	Puma	Carabao Daeng (home), Thai Airways (away); Waitrose (Home back), Euro Cake (Away back); Legend Alliance (shorts)
Rotherham United	(England) Alan Stubbs	(Republic of Ireland) Lee Frecklington	Puma	Parkgate Shopping (home); Balreed (away), TGB Sheds (third)
Sheffield Wednesday	(Portugal) Carlos Carvalhal	(Netherlands) Glenn Loovens	Sondico	Chansiri
Wolverhampton Wanderers	(Wales) Kenny Jackett	(England) Danny Batth	Puma	Silverbug

=== Managerial changes ===
Team	Outgoing manager	Manner of departure	Date of vacancy	Position in table	Incoming manager	Date of appointment
Brentford	(England) Mark Warburton	End of contract	15 May 2015	Pre-season	(Netherlands) Marinus Dijkhuizen	1 June 2015
Leeds United	(England) Neil Redfearn	Sacked	20 May 2015	Pre-season	(Germany) Uwe Rösler	20 May 2015
Derby County	(England) Steve McClaren	Sacked	25 May 2015	Pre-season	(England) Paul Clement	1 June 2015
Sheffield Wednesday	(England) Stuart Gray	Sacked	12 June 2015	Pre-season	(Portugal) Carlos Carvalhal	30 June 2015
Brentford	(Netherlands) Marinus Dijkhuizen	Sacked	28 September 2015	19th	(Republic of Ireland) Lee Carsley	28 September 2015
Rotherham United	(Scotland) Steve Evans	Mutual consent	28 September 2015	20th	(England) Neil Redfearn	9 October 2015
Leeds United	(Germany) Uwe Rösler	Sacked	19 October 2015	18th	(Scotland) Steve Evans	19 October 2015
Charlton Athletic	(Israel) Guy Luzon	Sacked	24 October 2015	22nd	(Belgium) Jose Riga	14 January 2016
Huddersfield Town	(England) Chris Powell	Sacked	4 November 2015	18th	(United States) David Wagner	5 November 2015
Queens Park Rangers	(England) Chris Ramsey	Sacked	4 November 2015	13th	(Netherlands) Jimmy Floyd Hasselbaink	4 December 2015
Fulham	(Wales) Kit Symons	Sacked	8 November 2015	12th	(Serbia) Slaviša Jokanović	27 December 2015
Blackburn Rovers	(England) Gary Bowyer	Sacked	10 November 2015	16th	(Scotland) Paul Lambert	15 November 2015
Brentford	(Republic of Ireland) Lee Carsley	End of caretaker spell	30 November 2015	11th	(England) Dean Smith	30 November 2015
Reading	(Scotland) Steve Clarke	Sacked	4 December 2015	7th	(England) Brian McDermott	17 December 2015
Bristol City	(England) Steve Cotterill	Sacked	14 January 2016	22nd	(England) Lee Johnson	6 February 2016
Rotherham United	(England) Neil Redfearn	Sacked	8 February 2016	22nd	(England) Neil Warnock	11 February 2016
Derby County	(England) Paul Clement	Sacked	8 February 2016	5th	(England) Nigel Pearson	27 May 2016
Nottingham Forest	(Scotland) Dougie Freedman	Sacked	13 March 2016	14th	(France) Philippe Montanier	27 June 2016
Bolton Wanderers	(Northern Ireland) Neil Lennon	Sacked	15 March 2016	24th	(England) Phil Parkinson	10 June 2016

== Rule changes ==
The 2015–16 season was the last season under the initial Financial Fair Play rules before the switch to the new rules. Changes to the Championship's financial fair play system allow clubs:

- Acceptable losses of £2 million during the 2015–16 season (down from £3 million during the 2014–15 season)
- Acceptable shareholder equity investment of £3 million during the 2015–16 season.
- Sanctions for exceeding the allowances take effect from the set of accounts due to be submitted on 1 December 2015 for the 2014–15 season.

== League table ==
Pos	Team	Pld	W	D	L	GF	GA	GD	Pts	Promotion, qualification or relegation
1	Burnley (C, P)	46	26	15	5	72	35	+37	93	Promotion to the Premier League
2	Middlesbrough (P)	46	26	11	9	63	31	+32	89	Promotion to the Premier League
3	Brighton & Hove Albion	46	24	17	5	72	42	+30	89	Qualification for the Championship play-offs (Note: Four teams play for one spot and promotion to the Premier League.)
4	Hull City (O, P)	46	24	11	11	69	35	+34	83	Qualification for the Championship play-offs
5	Derby County	46	21	15	10	66	43	+23	78	Qualification for the Championship play-offs
6	Sheffield Wednesday	46	19	17	10	66	45	+21	74	Qualification for the Championship play-offs
7	Ipswich Town	46	18	15	13	53	51	+2	69	
8	Cardiff City	46	17	17	12	56	51	+5	68	
9	Brentford	46	19	8	19	72	67	+5	65	
10	Birmingham City	46	16	15	15	53	49	+4	63	
11	Preston North End	46	15	17	14	45	45	0	62	
12	Queens Park Rangers	46	14	18	14	54	54	0	60	
13	Leeds United	46	14	17	15	50	58	−8	59	
14	Wolverhampton Wanderers	46	14	16	16	53	58	−5	58	
15	Blackburn Rovers	46	13	16	17	46	46	0	55	
16	Nottingham Forest	46	13	16	17	43	47	−4	55	
17	Reading	46	13	13	20	52	59	−7	52	
18	Bristol City	46	13	13	20	54	71	−17	52	
19	Huddersfield Town	46	13	12	21	59	70	−11	51	
20	Fulham	46	12	15	19	66	79	−13	51	
21	Rotherham United	46	13	10	23	53	71	−18	49	
22	Charlton Athletic (R)	46	9	13	24	40	80	−40	40	Relegation to EFL League One
23	Milton Keynes Dons (R)	46	9	12	25	39	69	−30	39	Relegation to EFL League One
24	Bolton Wanderers (R)	46	5	15	26	41	81	−40	30	Relegation to EFL League One

Source: BBC Sport
Rules for classification: 1) Points; 2) Goal difference; 3) Number of goals scored
(C) Champions; (O) Play-off winners; (P) Promoted; (R) Relegated

== Play-offs ==
Semi-finals
3	Brighton & Hove Albion	0	1	1
6	Sheffield Wednesday	2	1	3
4	Hull City	3	0	3
5	Derby County	0	2	2

Final
6	Sheffield Wednesday	0
4	Hull City	1

The four teams that finished from third to sixth played off, with the winning team, Hull City, gaining the final promotion spot to the Premier League.

In the play-off semi-finals the third placed team played the sixth placed team and the fourth placed team played the fifth placed team. The team that finished in the higher league position played away in the first leg and played at home in the second leg. If the aggregate score was level after both legs, then extra time would be played. If the scores were still level, a penalty shoot-out decided the winner. The away goals rule did apply in the semi-finals. The semi-finals were held on 13–14 and 16–17 May.

The winners from the two semi-finals, Hull City and Sheffield Wednesday, played at Wembley Stadium on 28 May 2016 in the play-off final, where Hull City won 1–0. The game is known as the richest game in football as the winning club is guaranteed significantly increased payments e.g. in the 2016-17 season the minimum payment for participating in the Premier League was £95 million. Due to a new TV rights deal, the average payment for a newly promoted club stood at around £100 million.

== Results ==
Home \ Away	BIR	BLB	BOL	BRE	B&HA	BRI	BUR	CAR	CHA	DER	FUL	HUD	HUL	IPS	LEE	MID	MKD	NOT	PNE	QPR	REA	ROT	SHW	WOL
Birmingham City		0–0	1–0	2–1	1–2	4–2	1–2	1–0	0–1	1–1	1–1	0–2	1–0	3–0	1–2	2–2	1–0	0–1	2–2	2–1	2–1	0–2	1–2	0–2
Blackburn Rovers	2–0		0–0	1–1	0–1	2–2	0–1	1–1	3–0	0–0	3–0	0–2	0–2	2–0	1–2	2–1	3–2	0–0	1–2	1–1	3–1	1–0	2–2	1–2
Bolton Wanderers	0–1	1–0		1–1	2–2	0–0	1–2	2–3	0–0	0–0	2–2	0–2	1–0	2–2	1–1	1–2	3–1	1–1	1–2	1–1	0–1	2–1	0–0	2–1
Brentford	0–2	0–1	3–1		0–0	1–1	1–3	2–1	1–2	1–3	3–0	4–2	0–2	2–2	1–1	0–1	2–0	2–1	2–1	1–0	1–3	2–1	1–2	3–0
Brighton & Hove Albion	2–1	1–0	3–2	3–0		2–1	2–2	1–1	3–2	1–1	5–0	2–1	1–0	0–1	4–0	0–3	2–1	1–0	0–0	4–0	1–0	2–1	0–0	0–1
Bristol City	0–0	0–2	6–0	2–4	0–4		1–2	0–2	1–1	2–3	1–4	4–0	1–1	2–1	2–2	1–0	1–1	2–0	1–2	1–1	0–2	1–1	4–1	1–0
Burnley	2–2	1–0	2–0	1–0	1–1	4–0		0–0	4–0	4–1	3–1	2–1	1–0	0–0	1–0	1–1	2–1	1–0	0–2	1–0	1–2	2–0	3–1	1–1
Cardiff City	1–1	1–0	2–1	3–2	4–1	0–0	2–2		2–1	2–1	1–1	2–0	0–2	1–0	0–2	1–0	0–0	1–1	2–1	0–0	2–0	2–2	2–2	2–0
Charlton Athletic	2–1	1–1	2–2	0–3	1–3	0–1	0–3	0–0		0–1	2–2	1–2	2–1	0–3	0–0	2–0	0–0	1–1	0–3	2–0	3–4	1–1	3–1	0–2
Derby County	0–3	1–0	4–1	2–0	2–2	4–0	0–0	2–0	1–1		2–0	2–0	4–0	0–1	1–2	1–1	0–1	1–0	0–0	1–0	1–1	3–0	1–1	4–2
Fulham	2–5	2–1	1–0	2–2	1–2	1–2	2–3	2–1	3–0	1–1		1–1	0–1	1–2	1–1	0–2	2–1	1–3	1–1	4–0	4–2	4–1	0–1	0–3
Huddersfield Town	1–1	1–1	4–1	1–5	1–1	1–2	1–3	2–3	5–0	1–2	1–1		2–2	0–1	0–3	0–2	2–0	1–1	3–1	0–1	3–1	2–0	0–1	1–0
Hull City	2–0	1–1	1–0	2–0	0–0	4–0	3–0	2–0	6–0	0–2	2–1	2–0		3–0	2–2	3–0	1–1	1–1	2–0	1–1	2–1	5–1	0–0	2–1
Ipswich Town	1–1	2–0	2–0	1–3	2–3	2–2	2–0	0–0	0–0	0–1	1–1	0–0	0–1		2–1	0–2	3–2	1–0	1–1	2–1	2–1	0–1	2–1	2–2
Leeds United	0–2	0–2	2–1	1–1	1–2	1–0	1–1	1–0	1–2	2–2	1–1	1–4	2–1	0–1		0–0	1–1	0–1	1–0	1–1	3–2	0–1	1–1	2–1
Middlesbrough	0–0	1–1	3–0	3–1	1–1	0–1	1–0	3–1	3–0	2–0	0–0	3–0	1–0	0–0	3–0		2–0	0–1	1–0	1–0	2–1	1–0	1–0	2–1
Milton Keynes Dons	0–2	3–0	1–0	1–4	1–2	0–2	0–5	2–1	1–0	1–3	1–1	1–1	0–2	0–1	1–2	1–1		1–2	0–1	2–0	1–0	0–4	2–1	1–2
Nottingham Forest	1–1	1–1	3–0	0–3	1–2	1–2	1–1	1–2	0–0	1–0	3–0	0–2	0–1	1–1	1–1	1–2	2–1		1–0	0–0	3–1	2–1	0–3	1–1
Preston North End	1–1	1–2	0–0	1–3	0–0	1–1	0–1	0–0	2–1	1–2	1–2	2–1	1–0	1–2	1–1	0–0	1–1	1–0		1–1	1–0	2–1	1–0	1–1
Queens Park Rangers	2–0	2–2	4–3	3–0	2–2	1–0	0–0	2–2	2–1	2–0	1–3	1–1	1–2	1–0	1–0	2–3	3–0	1–2	0–0		1–1	4–2	0–0	1–1
Reading	0–2	1–0	2–1	1–2	1–1	1–0	0–0	1–1	1–0	0–1	2–2	2–2	1–2	5–1	0–0	2–0	0–0	2–1	1–2	0–1		1–0	1–1	0–0
Rotherham United	0–0	0–1	4–0	2–1	2–0	3–0	1–2	2–1	1–4	3–3	1–3	1–1	2–0	2–5	2–1	1–0	1–4	0–0	0–0	0–3	1–1		1–2	1–2
Sheffield Wednesday	3–0	2–1	3–2	4–0	0–0	2–0	1–1	3–0	3–0	0–0	3–2	3–1	1–1	1–1	2–0	1–3	0–0	1–0	3–1	1–1	1–1	0–1		4–1
Wolverhampton Wanderers	0–0	0–0	2–2	0–2	0–0	2–1	0–0	1–3	2–1	2–1	3–2	3–0	1–1	0–0	2–3	1–3	0–0	1–1	1–2	2–3	1–0	0–0	2–1	

Source: BBC Sport
Legend: Blue = home team win; Yellow = draw; Red = away team win.

== Season statistics ==
=== Top scorers ===
Rank	Player	Club	Goals
1	(Jamaica) Andre Gray	Brentford/Burnley	25
2	(Scotland) Ross McCormack	Fulham	21
3	(Uruguay) Abel Hernández	Hull City	20
4	(Ivory Coast) Jonathan Kodjia	Bristol City	18
5	(Bermuda) Nahki Wells	Huddersfield Town	17
5	(Israel) Tomer Hemed	Brighton & Hove Albion	17
7	(Scotland) Jordan Rhodes	Blackburn Rovers/Middlesbrough	16
8	(France) Moussa Dembélé	Fulham	15
8	(Scotland) Chris Martin	Derby County	15
8	(Italy) Fernando Forestieri	Sheffield Wednesday	15

=== Clean sheets ===
Rank	Player	Club	Clean sheets
1	(Greece) Dimitrios Konstantopoulos	Middlesbrough	22
2	(England) Tom Heaton	Burnley	20
3	(Scotland) Allan McGregor	Hull City	19
4	(Poland) Tomasz Kuszczak	Birmingham City	15
4	(England) David Stockdale	Brighton & Hove Albion	15
5	(England) Scott Carson	Derby County	14
5	(Republic of Ireland) Keiren Westwood	Sheffield Wednesday	14
6	(Northern Ireland) Lee Camp	Rotherham United	13
7	(England) Jordan Pickford	Preston North End	12
7	(Scotland) David Marshall	Cardiff City	12
7	(England) Jason Steele	Blackburn Rovers	12

== Hat-tricks ==
Player	For	Against	Result	Date
(Portugal) Orlando Sá	Reading	Ipswich Town	5–1	11 September 2015
(Jamaica) Clayton Donaldson	Birmingham City	Bristol City	4–2	12 September 2015
(Republic of Ireland) Daryl Murphy	Ipswich Town	Rotherham United	5–2	7 November 2015
(England) Tom Ince	Derby County	Bristol City	4–0	15 December 2015
(Jamaica) Andre Gray	Burnley	Bristol City	4–0	28 December 2015
(Uruguay) Abel Hernández	Hull City	Charlton Athletic	6–0	16 January 2016
(France) Yaya Sanogo	Charlton Athletic	Reading	3–4	27 February 2016
(Israel) Tomer Hemed	Brighton & Hove Albion	Fulham	5–0	15 April 2016

== Discipline ==
=== Player ===
- Most yellow cards 14
  - Kyle McFadzean (Milton Keynes Dons)
- Most red cards 2
  - Patrick Bauer (Charlton Athletic)
  - Fernando Forestieri (Sheffield Wednesday)
  - Bailey Wright (Preston North End)
  - Lewis Dunk (Brighton & Hove Albion)

=== Club ===
- Most yellow cards 93
  - Leeds United
- Most red cards 4
  - Milton Keynes Dons
  - Bolton Wanderers
  - Nottingham Forest

== Monthly awards ==
Month	Manager of the Month		Player of the Month		Reference
Month	Manager	Club	Player	Club	Reference
August	(Republic of Ireland) Chris Hughton	Brighton & Hove Albion	(Democratic Republic of the Congo) Kazenga LuaLua	Brighton & Hove Albion	
September	(Spain) Aitor Karanka	Middlesbrough	(Scotland) Jordan Rhodes	Blackburn Rovers	
October	(Republic of Ireland) Lee Carsley	Brentford	(Republic of Ireland) Alan Judge	Brentford	
November	(Republic of Ireland) Mick McCarthy	Ipswich Town	(Republic of Ireland) Daryl Murphy	Ipswich Town	
December	(Spain) Aitor Karanka	Middlesbrough	(England) Adam Clayton	Middlesbrough	
January	(England) Steve Bruce	Hull City	(Uruguay) Abel Hernández	Hull City	
February	(England) Sean Dyche	Burnley	(England) Aden Flint	Bristol City	
March	(England) Neil Warnock	Rotherham United	(Wales) Sam Vokes	Burnley	
April	(Republic of Ireland) Chris Hughton	Brighton & Hove Albion	(France) Anthony Knockaert	Brighton & Hove Albion	

== Attendances ==
Pos	Team	Total	High	Low	Average	Change
1	Derby County	682,249	33,010	26,834	29,663	+1.5%
2	Brighton & Hove Albion	588,415	30,292	21,397	25,583	−0.2%
3	Middlesbrough	566,419	33,806	19,966	24,627	+25.9%
4	Sheffield Wednesday	520,738	31,843	18,706	22,641	+2.9%
5	Leeds United	516,261	29,311	17,103	22,446	−7.5%
6	Wolverhampton Wanderers	463,609	24,238	17,387	20,157	−10.1%
7	Nottingham Forest	452,543	27,551	16,449	19,676	−16.2%
8	Ipswich Town	436,756	23,615	16,488	18,989	−5.1%
9	Birmingham City	404,867	20,302	14,366	17,603	+9.3%
10	Fulham	404,023	20,316	14,283	17,566	−3.9%
11	Reading	397,556	21,581	12,949	17,285	+1.5%
12	Hull City	395,568	21,842	15,139	17,199	−27.0%^{1}
13	Burnley	384,305	20,478	12,430	16,709	−12.7%^{1}
14	Cardiff City	378,653	28,680	12,729	16,463	−22.1%
15	Queens Park Rangers	367,857	18,031	14,007	15,994	−10.2%^{1}
16	Charlton Athletic	359,541	21,506	12,294	15,632	−6.4%
17	Bristol City	351,705	15,854	14,291	15,292	+26.8%^{2}
18	Bolton Wanderers	346,299	18,423	12,257	15,056	−2.3%
19	Blackburn Rovers	325,003	21,029	12,002	14,131	−5.2%
20	MK Dons	302,633	21,345	9,402	13,158	+39.2%^{2}
21	Preston North End	299,801	19,852	9,963	13,035	+20.1%^{2}
22	Huddersfield Town	290,505	17,118	9,736	12,631	−7.2%
23	Brentford	237,120	12,202	8,363	10,310	−4.7%
24	Rotherham United	230,578	11,658	8,534	10,025	−2.1%
	League total	9,703,004	33,806	8,363	17,578	+2.9%

Source: "Sky Bet Championship 15/16 Home attendance". statbunker.com.
Notes:
1: Team played in Premier League last season.
2: Team played in League One last season.
