= Louis Thompson =

Welsh footballer (born 1994)

Personal information
- Full name: Louis Clyde William Thompson
- Date of birth: 19 December 1994 (age 31)
- Place of birth: Bristol, England
- Height: 5 ft 11 in (1.80 m)
- Position: Defensive midfielder

Team information
- Current team: Stevenage
- Number: 23

Youth career
- 2011–2012: Swindon Town

Senior career*
Years	Team	Apps	(Gls)
2011–2014	Swindon Town	34	(2)
2014–2021	Norwich City	9	(0)
2014–2015	→ Swindon Town (loan)	28	(2)
2015–2016	→ Swindon Town (loan)	13	(2)
2016	→ Swindon Town (loan)	15	(0)
2019–2020	→ Shrewsbury Town (loan)	10	(0)
2020	→ Milton Keynes Dons (loan)	9	(0)
2020–2021	→ Milton Keynes Dons (loan)	17	(0)
2021–2023	Portsmouth	49	(2)
2023–	Stevenage	91	(5)

International career^{‡}
2012	Wales U19	3	(0)
2015	Wales U21	2	(0)
- * Club domestic league appearances and goals as of 31 December 2025 (UTC) ‡ National team caps and goals as of 21:00, 9 October 2015 (UTC)

Louis Clyde William Thompson (born 19 December 1994) is a professional footballer who plays as a defensive-midfielder for EFL League One club Stevenage. He is a former Wales U21 international.

== Club career ==
=== Swindon Town ===
Thompson started his career at Swindon Town where he followed his older brother Nathan through the Wiltshire football club's youth system under the guidance of former Wales international footballer and Swindon coach, Paul Bodin. During the 2011–2012 season, Swindon Town manager Paolo Di Canio drafted Thompson into the senior side by naming him on the substitutes bench for FA Cup victories over Huddersfield Town, Colchester United and Wigan Athletic. He was also on the bench for the Football League Trophy draw at Barnet and Football League Two wins over AFC Wimbledon and Rotherham United. However, Thompson failed to make it on to the pitch during any of those fixtures.

Thompson made his first team debut for Swindon on 28 January 2012 as an 81st-minute substitute for fellow Town midfielder Simon Ferry during the 2–0 away loss to Leicester City in the FA Cup fourth round. After making his debut, Thompson expressed his gratitude to Di Canio for giving him his first opportunity within professional football by telling the local Swindon newspaper, the Evening Advertiser, that it was "an amazing feeling to make my debut at such a young age. I am so thankful to the gaffer for giving me my chance".

On 30 May 2013, it was announced that both Louis Thompson and his brother Nathan had agreed new two-year contracts with Swindon.

=== Norwich City ===
On 1 September 2014, he joined Norwich City and was loaned back to Swindon for the rest of the 2014–15 season.

On 11 September 2015, Thompson rejoined Swindon Town on a loan valid to December 2015.

On 1 February 2016, Thompson again returned to Swindon, on a loan until the end of the season.

On 13 December 2016, Thompson agreed a new two-and-a-half year contract at Norwich. In January 2017, Thompson was ruled out for the rest of the 2016–17 season after suffering an achilles injury. Thompson suffered a further setback, a second achilles injury, in July 2017 and missed the 2017–18 season. In October 2018, he signed a new four-year contract with Norwich. He made six league appearances as Norwich were promoted to the Premier League as winners of the 2018–19 EFL Championship.

On 16 August 2019, Thompson joined League One side Shrewsbury Town on a season-long loan. He made his debut for the club on 20 August, coming on as a 59th-minute substitute in a 2–3 away win at Accrington Stanley. He scored his first goal for Shrewsbury when he scored in an EFL Trophy tie against Macclesfield Town on 13 November 2019. Thompson returned to Norwich from his loan spell on 2 January 2020.

On 16 January 2020, Milton Keynes Dons announced they had agreed a loan deal until the end of the 2019–20 season. On 18 August 2020 Thompson returned on loan for the duration of the 2020–21 season.

Thompson left Norwich on 25 July 2021 after his contract was cancelled by mutual consent.

=== Portsmouth ===
On 10 August 2021, Thompson signed a one-year contract at Portsmouth. He made his debut on 7 September 2021, starting a 5–3 defeat to Wimbledon in the EFL Trophy. He scored his first goal for the club on 22 February in a 2–1 win against Shrewsbury. After 38 appearances for the club across the 2021–22 season, the club took up their option to extend his contract by a further year.

He departed the club at the end of the 2022–23 season.

=== Stevenage ===
On 19 June 2023, Thompson agreed to sign for newly promoted League One side Stevenage, joining brother Nathan who had joined the club earlier in the month.

On 11 April 2025, he signed a "new, improved and extended" contract with the club.

== International career ==
In 2012, Thompson was called into the Wales under-19 squad for the European championship qualifying matches. He was later called up to the Wales under-21 squad versus Moldova on 22 March 2013.

== Personal life ==
His brother Nathan Thompson is a former professional footballer who played for several of the same clubs as him including Swindon Town, Portsmouth and Milton Keynes Dons.

== Club statistics ==
As of match played 2 August 2025

Appearances and goals by club, season and competition
Club	Season	League			FA Cup		League Cup		Other		Total	
Club	Season	Division	Apps	Goals	Apps	Goals	Apps	Goals	Apps	Goals	Apps	Goals
Swindon Town	2012–13	League One	2	0	0	0	1	0	0	0	3	0
Swindon Town	2013–14	League One	28	2	0	0	3	0	4 (Note: Appearances in the Football League Trophy)	0	35	2
Swindon Town	2014–15	League One	4	0	0	0	2	1	0	0	6	1
Swindon Town	Total		34	2	0	0	6	1	4	0	44	3
Norwich City U21	2016–17	—	—		—		—		2 (Note: Appearance(s) in EFL Trophy)	0	2	0
Norwich City	2016–17	Championship	3	0	0	0	3	0	0	0	6	0
Norwich City	2017–18	Championship	0	0	0	0	0	0	0	0	0	0
Norwich City	2018–19	Championship	6	0	0	0	2	0	0	0	8	0
Norwich City	2019–20	Premier League	0	0	0	0	0	0	0	0	0	0
Norwich City	Total		9	0	0	0	5	0	0	0	14	0
Swindon Town (loan)	2014–15	League One	28	2	1	0	0	0	3 (Note: Two appearances in the Football League Trophy and one in the League One play-offs)	0	32	2
Swindon Town (loan)	2015–16	League One	28	2	1	0	0	0	0	0	29	2
Swindon Town (loan)	Total		56	4	2	0	0	0	3	0	61	4
Shrewsbury Town (loan)	2019–20	League One	10	0	1	0	0	0	3	1	14	1
Milton Keynes Dons (loan)	2019–20	League One	9	0	—		—		—		9	0
Milton Keynes Dons (loan)	2020–21	League One	17	0	1	0	0	0	3	0	21	0
Milton Keynes Dons (loan)	Total		26	0	1	0	0	0	3	0	30	0
Portsmouth	2021–22	League One	32	1	1	0	0	0	5	0	38	1
Portsmouth	2022–23	League One	17	1	1	0	0	0	1	0	19	1
Portsmouth	Total		49	2	2	0	0	0	6	0	57	2
Stevenage	2023–24	League One	42	2	3	0	2	0	1	0	48	2
Stevenage	2024–25	League One	40	2	1	0	0	0	3	0	44	2
Stevenage	2025–26	League One	1	0	0	0	0	0	0	0	1	0
Stevenage	Total		83	4	4	0	2	0	4	0	93	4
Career total			267	12	10	0	13	1	25	1	315	14
