= 2018–19 National League =

National League
- Season: 2018–19

The 2018–19 National League season, known as the Vanarama National League for sponsorship reasons, was the fourth season under English football's new title of National League, fifteenth season consisting of three divisions and the fortieth season overall.

== National League ==
National League
- Season: 2018–19
- Champions: Leyton Orient
- Promoted: Leyton Orient; Salford City
- Relegated: Braintree Town; Maidstone United; Gateshead; Havant & Waterlooville

The National League consists of 24 clubs.

=== Promotion and relegation ===
Despite a 2–1 defeat to Boston United on 21 April 2018, Salford City became 2017–18 National League North champions after Harrogate Town lost 3–1 to Bradford Park Avenue. Havant & Waterlooville were crowned 2017–18 National League South champions on 28 April after a 3–2 victory over Concord Rangers. On 13 May, Harrogate Town were promoted after a 3–0 win against Brackley Town in the 2017–18 National League North playoff final. All three teams played in the National League for the first time in their histories. On the same day as Harrogate's promotion, Braintree Town were also promoted after beating Hampton & Richmond 4–3 on penalties after a 1–1 draw in the 2017–18 National League South playoff final, securing an instant return to the National League.

On 24 April, after 97 years as an EFL club, Chesterfield were relegated to the National League following Morecambe's 0–0 draw against Cambridge United. On 5 May 2018, despite a 3–0 victory against Chesterfield, Barnet became the second club to be relegated from League Two following Morecambe's 0–0 draw against Coventry City, ending their three-year stay in the EFL.

These teams replaced Macclesfield Town, Tranmere Rovers, Chester, Guiseley, Torquay United and Woking. Macclesfield Town were crowned 2017–18 National League champions and promoted to League Two on 21 April after a 2–0 victory over Eastleigh, ending their six-year absence from the EFL. Tranmere Rovers were promoted to League Two on 12 May after a 2–1 victory over Boreham Wood in the playoff final and returned to the EFL after a three-year absence. Boreham Wood and Sutton United were invited to compete in the 2018–19 Scottish Challenge Cup in a new expansion of that competition as the highest-finishing remaining teams in the division.

Chester were the first team to be relegated from National League on 8 April after a 2–0 loss to Tranmere Rovers. Despite staying up on the final day for the past two seasons, it was not to be third time lucky for Guiseley who joined them on 17 April after a 1–0 loss to relegation rivals Barrow. Torquay United became the third team to be relegated from the National league on 21 April after a 1–1 draw with Hartlepool United, confirming the club's first ever relegation to the sixth tier. The fourth and final team to suffer relegation was Woking, who were relegated on 28 April following a 2–1 defeat to Dover Athletic, ending their five-year stay in the National League.

=== Team changes ===
The following clubs changed divisions after the 2017–18 season:

==== To National League ====
Promoted from 2017–18 National League North

- Salford City
- Harrogate Town

Promoted from 2017–18 National League South

- Havant & Waterlooville
- Braintree Town

Relegated from 2017–18 League Two

- Chesterfield
- Barnet

==== From National League ====
Promoted to 2018–19 League Two

- Macclesfield Town
- Tranmere Rovers

Relegated to 2018–19 National League North

- Chester
- Guiseley

Relegated to 2018–19 National League South

- Torquay United
- Woking

=== Stadiums and locations ===
Locations of the 2018–19 National League clubs (Greater London shown in more detail below)
Locations of the 2018–19 National League clubs (Greater London)

Team	Location	Stadium	Capacity
AFC Fylde	Wesham	Mill Farm Sports Village	6,000
Aldershot Town	Aldershot	Recreation Ground	7,200
Barnet	London (Edgware)	The Hive Stadium	6,418
Barrow	Barrow-in-Furness	Holker Street	5,045
Boreham Wood	Borehamwood	Meadow Park	4,502
Braintree Town	Braintree	Cressing Road	4,085
Bromley	London (Bromley)	Hayes Lane	5,300
Chesterfield	Chesterfield	Proact Stadium	10,504
Dagenham & Redbridge	London (Dagenham)	Victoria Road	6,078
Dover Athletic	Dover	Crabble Athletic Ground	5,745
Eastleigh	Eastleigh	Ten Acres	5,250
Ebbsfleet United	Northfleet	Stonebridge Road	4,500
FC Halifax Town	Halifax	The Shay	14,061
Gateshead	Gateshead	Gateshead International Stadium	11,800
Harrogate Town	Harrogate	Wetherby Road	3,800
Hartlepool United	Hartlepool	Victoria Park	7,856
Havant & Waterlooville	Havant	West Leigh Park	5,300
Leyton Orient	London (Leyton)	Brisbane Road	9,271
Maidenhead United	Maidenhead	York Road	3,377
Maidstone United	Maidstone	Gallagher Stadium	4,200
Salford City	Salford	Moor Lane	5,108
Solihull Moors	Solihull	Damson Park	4,313
Sutton United	London (Sutton)	Gander Green Lane	5,013
Wrexham	Wrexham	Racecourse Ground	10,771

=== Personnel and sponsoring ===
Team	Manager^{1}	Captain	Kit manufacturer	Shirt sponsor
AFC Fylde	Dave Challinor	Lewis Montrose	Kappa	VetPlus
Aldershot Town	Gary Waddock	Karleigh Osborne	Adidas	Bridges Estate Agents
Barnet	Darren Currie	Callum Reynolds	Jako	Canon
Barrow	Ian Evatt	Josh Granite	BLK	JF Hornby & Co.
Boreham Wood	Luke Garrard	Mark Ricketts	Erreà	Barnet and Southgate College
Braintree Town	Danny Searle	Ben Killip	Hummel	Andreas carter sports
Bromley	Neil Smith	Jack Holland	Macron	Southwark Metals
Chesterfield	John Sheridan	Jonathan Smith	Puma	G.F. Tomlinson
Dagenham & Redbridge	Peter Taylor	Ben Nunn	Sondico	West & Co
Dover Athletic	Andy Hessenthaler	Mitch Brundle	BLK	Gomez
Eastleigh	Ben Strevens	Danny Hollands	Macron	Utilita
Ebbsfleet United	Garry Hill	Dave Winfield	Macron	Mitsubishi Electric
FC Halifax Town	Jamie Fullarton	Matty Brown	Adidas	Northern Powerhouse Developments (Home); Pennine Pneumatic Services Ltd (Away); Architectural Cladding Products Limited (Third)
Gateshead	Ben Clarke	Robbie Tinkler	Sondico	Sevcon
Harrogate Town	Simon Weaver	Josh Falkingham	Kappa	Strata
Hartlepool United	Craig Hignett	Andrew Davies	BLK	Utility Alliance Limited
Havant & Waterlooville	Lee Bradbury	Brian Stock	Joma	Bishops Printers
Leyton Orient	Justin Edinburgh	Jobi McAnuff	Nike	The Sun Dream Team
Maidenhead United	Alan Devonshire	Alan Massey	BLK	Utility Alliance Limited
Maidstone United	John Still	Will de Havilland	Macron	Britelite
Salford City	Graham Alexander	Liam Hogan	Umbro	Soccer Saturday Super 6
Solihull Moors	Tim Flowers	Kyle Storer	Surridge	John Shepherd Estate Agents
Sutton United	Paul Doswell	Jamie Collins	Joma	Angel Plastics
Wrexham	Bryan Hughes	Shaun Pearson	Macron	Ifor Williams Trailers

=== Managerial changes ===
Team	Outgoing manager	Manner of departure	Date of vacancy	Position in table	Incoming manager	Date of appointment
Chesterfield	Jack Lester	Dismissed	24 April 2018	Pre-season	Martin Allen	15 May 2018
Wrexham	Andy Davies	End of Interim Contract	2 May 2018	Pre-season	Sam Ricketts	2 May 2018
Salford City	Anthony Johnson; Bernard Morley	Resigned	8 May 2018	Pre-season	Graham Alexander	14 May 2018
Barnet	Martin Allen	Resigned	10 May 2018	Pre-season	John Still	18 May 2018
Dagenham & Redbridge	John Still	Resigned	17 May 2018	Pre-season	Peter Taylor	5 June 2018
Barrow	Adrian Pennock	Dismissed	18 May 2018	Pre-season	Ian Evatt	15 June 2018
Solihull Moors	Mark Yates	Signed by Macclesfield Town	19 June 2018	Pre-season	Tim Flowers	20 June 2018
Maidstone United	Jay Saunders	Mutual consent	28 August 2018	19th	Harry Wheeler	11 September 2018
Dover Athletic	Chris Kinnear	Dismissed	5 October 2018	24th	Andy Hessenthaler	8 October 2018
Braintree Town	Brad Quinton	Mutual agreement	7 October 2018	24th	Andy Porter	7 October 2018
Eastleigh	Andy Hessenthaler	Signed by Dover Athletic	8 October 2018	10th	Ben Strevens	8 October 2018
Braintree Town	Andy Porter	Resigned	10 October 2018	24th	Hakan Hayrettin	10 October 2018
Ebbsfleet United	Daryl McMahon	Dismissed	7 November 2018	10th	Garry Hill	8 November 2018
Hartlepool United	Matthew Bates	Dismissed	28 November 2018	12th	Richard Money	11 December 2018
Wrexham	Sam Ricketts	Signed by Shrewsbury Town	3 December 2018	4th	Graham Barrow	3 December 2018
Chesterfield	Martin Allen	Dismissed	27 December 2018	22nd	John Sheridan	9 January 2019
Barnet	John Still	Retired	29 December 2018	13th	Darren Currie	29 December 2018
Gateshead	Steve Watson	Appointed as manager of York City	10 January 2019	8th	Ben Clark	10 January 2019
Maidstone United	Harry Wheeler	Resigned	13 January 2019	23rd	John Still	24 January 2019
Hartlepool United	Richard Money	Resigned	23 January 2019	15th	Craig Hignett	23 January 2019
Braintree Town	Hakan Hayrettin	Appointed as assistant manager of Maidstone United	23 January 2019	24th	Danny Searle	23 January 2019
Wrexham	Graham Barrow	Resigned	2 February 2019	3rd	Bryan Hughes	6 February 2019

=== League table ===
Pos	Team	Pld	W	D	L	GF	GA	GD	Pts	Promotion, qualification or relegation
1	Leyton Orient (C, P)	46	25	14	7	73	35	+38	89	Promotion to EFL League Two
2	Solihull Moors	46	25	11	10	73	43	+30	86	Qualification for the National League play-off semi-finals
3	Salford City (O, P)	46	25	10	11	77	45	+32	85	Qualification for the National League play-off semi-finals
4	Wrexham	46	25	9	12	58	39	+19	84	Qualification for the National League play-off quarter-finals
5	AFC Fylde	46	22	15	9	72	41	+31	81	Qualification for the National League play-off quarter-finals
6	Harrogate Town	46	21	11	14	78	57	+21	74	Qualification for the National League play-off quarter-finals
7	Eastleigh	46	22	8	16	62	63	−1	74	Qualification for the National League play-off quarter-finals
8	Ebbsfleet United	46	18	13	15	64	50	+14	67	
9	Sutton United	46	17	14	15	55	60	−5	65	
10	Barrow	46	17	13	16	52	51	+1	64	
11	Bromley	46	16	12	18	68	69	−1	60	
12	Barnet	46	16	12	18	45	50	−5	60	
13	Dover Athletic	46	16	12	18	58	64	−6	60	
14	Chesterfield	46	14	17	15	55	53	+2	59	
15	FC Halifax Town	46	13	20	13	44	43	+1	59	
16	Hartlepool United	46	15	14	17	56	62	−6	59	
17	Gateshead (R)	46	19	9	18	52	48	+4	57 (Note: Gateshead were deducted 9 points for breach of financial regulations.)	Relegation to National League North
18	Dagenham & Redbridge	46	15	11	20	50	56	−6	56	
19	Maidenhead United	46	16	6	24	45	70	−25	54	
20	Boreham Wood	46	12	16	18	53	65	−12	52	
21	Aldershot Town	46	11	11	24	38	67	−29	44 (Note: Gateshead were demoted to the National League North on 8 June 2019 because of financial irregularities. As a result, Aldershot Town were given a reprieve from relegation.)	
22	Havant & Waterlooville (R)	46	9	13	24	62	84	−22	40	Relegation to National League South
23	Braintree Town (R)	46	11	8	27	48	78	−30	38 (Note: Braintree Town were deducted 3 points for fielding an ineligible player in a game against AFC Fylde.)	Relegation to National League South
24	Maidstone United (R)	46	9	7	30	37	82	−45	34	Relegation to National League South

Source: National League official site
Rules for classification: 1) Points; 2) Goal difference; 3) Number of goals scored; 4) Number of matches won; 5) Head-to-head results
(C) Champions; (O) Play-off winners; (P) Promoted; (R) Relegated

=== Play-offs ===
Quarter-finals
5	AFC Fylde	3
6	Harrogate Town	1
4	Wrexham	0
7	Eastleigh (a.e.t.)	1

Semi-finals
2	Solihull Moors	0
5	AFC Fylde	1
3	Salford City	1 (4)
7	Eastleigh	1 (3)

Final
5	AFC Fylde	0
3	Salford City	3

==== Quarter-finals ====
1 May 2019	AFC Fylde	3–1	Harrogate Town	Medlar-with-Wesham
	Croasdale 10'; Bond 15'; Brady 90'	Report	Burke 53' (own goal)	Stadium: Mill Farm Sports Village; Attendance: 1,560

2 May 2019	Wrexham	0–1 (a.e.t.)	Eastleigh	Wrexham
		Report	Hollands 109'	Stadium: Racecourse Ground; Attendance: 6,723

==== Semi-finals ====
4 May 2019	Solihull Moors	0–1	AFC Fylde	Solihull
			Philliskirk 2'	Stadium: Damson Park; Attendance: 3,681

5 May 2019	Salford City	1–1 (4–3 p)	Eastleigh	Salford
	Piergianni 43'	Report	McCallum 57'	Stadium: Moor Lane; Attendance: 2,963; Referee: Leigh Doughty (Lancashire)
	Penalties
	Rooney (penalty missed); Hogan (penalty scored); Whitehead (penalty scored); Redmond (penalty scored); Touray (penalty scored)		(penalty scored) Hare; (penalty scored) McKnight; (penalty missed) Matthews; (penalty scored) McCallum; (penalty missed) Zebroski

==== Final ====
11 May 2019
15:00

AFC Fylde	0–3	Salford City
	Report	Dieseruvwe 15'; Piergianni 53'; Touray 61'

Wembley Stadium, London
Attendance: 8,049
Referee: James Oldham

=== Results table ===
Home \ Away	FYL	ALD	BRN	BRW	BOR	BRA	BRO	CHE	DAG	DOV	EAS	EBB	HAL	GAT	HAR	HAT	HAV	LEY	MDH	MDS	SAL	SOL	SUT	WRE
AFC Fylde	—	3–0	1–0	0–0	2–1	3–0	2–1	0–1	1–1	4–0	4–2	2–0	0–2	1–0	0–0	4–2	6–2	1–3	2–1	2–0	0–2	3–1	2–2	2–0
Aldershot Town	0–0	—	0–0	0–2	1–1	1–0	3–2	0–2	2–1	2–0	1–3	0–2	3–0	0–2	0–2	1–1	2–0	1–2	0–0	0–1	0–1	0–3	2–1	0–0
Barnet	1–1	2–0	—	3–1	1–1	1–1	1–1	0–2	2–1	2–0	1–2	0–3	1–1	1–2	1–0	0–0	2–2	0–0	1–0	0–2	1–3	2–0	0–1	1–2
Barrow	1–1	2–1	0–2	—	1–2	1–0	1–1	3–2	0–1	2–3	0–3	0–0	0–0	1–2	2–2	1–0	3–0	2–3	2–0	1–0	3–2	1–2	2–1	0–0
Boreham Wood	1–1	0–2	1–0	1–1	—	1–1	2–1	1–0	1–0	0–1	3–3	0–0	2–1	1–1	2–4	0–4	1–3	1–0	3–1	0–1	2–3	2–2	1–2	0–2
Braintree Town	2–1	0–1	4–0	0–2	1–1	—	2–4	1–3	2–0	2–1	1–2	0–4	0–2	2–0	0–4	1–1	3–4	1–5	0–2	0–1	1–0	0–3	2–2	0–1
Bromley	3–2	2–2	0–1	2–1	0–2	2–4	—	3–3	0–2	2–2	0–1	5–1	2–2	1–0	1–1	4–0	4–0	2–1	1–0	2–0	0–2	0–2	2–1	2–0
Chesterfield	0–0	3–0	0–1	0–0	3–2	1–0	1–1	—	2–0	0–0	2–3	3–3	1–0	0–3	0–1	1–1	0–0	0–1	1–3	4–1	2–0	0–4	3–0	1–1
Dagenham & Redbridge	2–1	1–1	0–1	0–0	4–4	1–0	3–0	1–1	—	1–3	2–0	1–3	1–1	0–2	2–1	1–2	3–1	2–1	2–2	1–2	0–0	1–1	1–0	1–2
Dover Athletic	2–1	1–0	1–2	0–2	1–1	3–0	1–1	0–0	0–2	—	1–2	1–1	2–1	1–2	2–3	2–1	4–3	0–0	2–0	3–1	1–4	0–2	3–0	0–1
Eastleigh	0–0	1–2	0–3	0–1	1–0	2–1	1–0	1–1	1–0	2–2	—	0–1	0–1	1–0	2–1	3–2	2–1	1–1	2–0	2–0	1–1	1–2	3–2	1–3
Ebbsfleet United	1–3	3–1	1–0	1–0	3–2	4–2	1–2	0–1	0–1	0–1	3–0	—	4–0	0–1	0–2	0–0	1–1	2–0	3–0	1–1	0–1	0–1	0–1	4–2
FC Halifax Town	0–0	0–0	3–0	2–0	1–1	0–0	2–2	1–1	2–1	1–0	0–1	0–0	—	1–0	1–1	1–2	0–0	1–1	0–1	3–0	0–0	2–0	0–1	2–1
Gateshead	0–1	3–0	2–1	0–2	1–1	0–1	2–0	1–0	2–0	2–1	0–1	1–1	1–1	—	2–3	2–1	0–0	1–1	0–1	1–0	2–1	1–2	0–0	1–1
Harrogate Town	1–2	4–1	2–0	4–2	0–1	3–1	1–0	1–1	1–1	2–2	4–0	1–2	1–2	2–0	—	3–1	3–2	0–3	1–0	2–2	0–1	3–1	2–2	0–0
Hartlepool United	1–2	1–1	1–3	0–0	2–0	2–1	1–2	1–0	1–2	3–2	1–1	0–1	2–1	2–1	2–2	—	1–1	1–1	2–1	1–2	3–2	0–1	2–3	1–0
Havant & Waterlooville	1–1	2–1	0–2	2–0	0–0	2–1	0–3	1–2	3–0	0–0	2–2	3–3	2–1	0–1	1–2	1–2	—	1–2	7–0	5–2	1–1	0–1	1–2	2–3
Leyton Orient	2–0	0–0	3–1	2–2	1–0	0–0	3–1	3–1	1–0	3–0	3–2	1–1	2–2	2–0	2–0	0–0	4–0	—	0–1	3–0	0–3	3–0	0–1	1–0
Maidenhead United	0–6	4–3	0–1	1–1	1–0	0–1	2–2	2–0	1–1	1–0	2–0	1–1	3–0	1–3	1–2	0–1	2–1	0–2	—	3–2	0–3	1–2	1–0	0–2
Maidstone United	1–1	0–2	2–1	1–0	1–2	0–2	0–1	1–1	0–3	0–1	1–3	0–2	0–1	2–3	0–2	1–1	2–0	1–2	2–4	—	0–2	1–3	0–1	1–1
Salford City	0–1	4–0	0–0	3–1	3–1	2–2	2–1	3–2	1–2	1–3	0–2	1–1	2–1	1–1	3–2	3–0	3–0	1–1	3–0	1–0	—	2–0	2–0	2–0
Solihull Moors	1–2	1–0	2–2	0–1	0–0	2–1	5–0	2–2	2–0	2–2	4–1	2–1	0–0	1–0	2–0	0–1	3–2	0–0	1–0	5–0	0–0	—	2–2	1–0
Sutton United	0–0	2–1	0–0	0–1	0–4	0–3	1–0	1–1	1–0	2–2	1–0	1–0	1–1	4–2	2–1	2–2	2–2	1–2	0–1	2–2	2–1	2–2	—	3–0
Wrexham	0–0	2–0	1–0	1–3	3–0	3–1	2–2	1–0	1–0	0–1	2–0	4–1	0–0	3–1	2–1	1–0	1–0	0–2	1–0	1–0	5–1	1–0	1–0	—

Source: National League Results Grid
Legend: Blue = home team win; Yellow = draw; Red = away team win.
For upcoming matches, an "a" indicates there is an article about the rivalry between the two participants.

=== Top scorers ===
Rank	Player	Club	Goals
1	(England) Danny Rowe	AFC Fylde	26
2	(England) Paul McCallum	Eastleigh	25
3	(Zimbabwe) Macauley Bonne	Leyton Orient	22
4	(Republic of Ireland) Adam Rooney	Salford City	20
5	(England) Scott Boden	Gateshead / Chesterfield	19
6	(England) Jack Muldoon	Harrogate Town	16
7	(England) Michael Cheek	Ebbsfleet United	15
8	(Tanzania) Adi Yussuf	Solihull Moors	14
9	(Montserrat) Adrian Clifton	Maidenhead United	13
9	(England) JJ Hooper	Bromley	13
9	(England) Liam Noble	Hartlepool United	13
9	(England) Alfie Rutherford	Havant & Waterlooville	13
13	(England) Jermaine Hylton	Solihull Moors	12
13	(England) Danny Kedwell	Ebbsfleet United	12

=== Monthly awards ===
Each month the Vanarama National League announces their official Player of the Month and Manager of the Month.

Month	Player of the Month	Club	Manager of the Month	Club
August 2018	(England) Akil Wright	Wrexham	(Scotland) Jamie Fullarton	FC Halifax Town
September 2018	(England) Marvin Ekpiteta	Leyton Orient	(England) Graham Alexander	Salford City
October 2018	(England) Mike Williamson	Gateshead	(Wales) Sam Ricketts	Wrexham
November 2018	(England) Elliot Justham	Dag & Red	(England) Justin Edinburgh	Leyton Orient
December 2018	(England) Michael Cheek	Ebbsfleet United	(England) Ian Evatt	Barrow
January 2019	(England) Kevin Lokko	Dover Athletic	(England) Tim Flowers	Solihull Moors
February 2019	(England) Paul McCallum	Eastleigh	(England) Alan Devonshire	Maidenhead United
March 2019	(England) Carl Piergianni	Salford City	(England) Justin Edinburgh	Leyton Orient
April 2019	(Tanzania) Mo Sagaf	Braintree Town	(England) Andy Hessenthaler	Dover Athletic

=== Team of the Season ===
At the end of the season, the National League announced its official team of the season.

Position	Player	Club
Goalkeeper	(England) Dean Brill	Leyton Orient
Defender	(England) Josh Hare	Eastleigh
Defender	(England) Carl Piergianni	Salford City
Defender	(England) Shaun Pearson	Wrexham
Defender	(England) Dan Jones	Barrow
Midfielder	(England) Darren Carter	Solihull Moors
Midfielder	(England) Jamey Osborne	Solihull Moors
Midfielder	(Jamaica) Jobi McAnuff	Leyton Orient
Forward	(England) Paul McCallum	Eastleigh
Forward	(Zimbabwe) Macauley Bonne	Leyton Orient
Forward	(England) Danny Rowe	AFC Fylde

== National League North ==
National League North
- Season: 2018–19
- Champions: Stockport County
- Promoted: Stockport County; Chorley
- Relegated: Nuneaton Borough; Ashton United; F.C. United of Manchester

=== Team changes ===
==== To National League North ====
Promoted from 2017–18 Northern Premier League Premier Division

- Altrincham
- Ashton United

Promoted from 2017–18 Southern League Premier Division

- Hereford

Relegated from 2017–18 National League

- Chester
- Guiseley

==== From National League North ====
Promoted to 2018–19 National League

- Salford City
- Harrogate Town

Relegated to 2018–19 Northern Premier League Premier Division

- Gainsborough Trinity
- North Ferriby United

Relegated to 2018–19 Southern League Premier Division Central

- Tamworth

=== Stadia and locations ===
Locations of the 2018–19 National League North clubs (Greater Manchester shown in more detail below)
Locations of the 2018–19 National League North clubs (Greater Manchester)

Team	Location	Stadium	Capacity
AFC Telford United	Telford	New Bucks Head	6,300
Alfreton Town	Alfreton	North Street	3,600
Altrincham	Altrincham	Moss Lane	6,085
Ashton United	Ashton-under-Lyne	Hurst Cross	4,500
Blyth Spartans	Blyth	Croft Park	4,435
Boston United	Boston	York Street	6,643
Brackley Town	Brackley	St. James Park	3,500
Bradford (Park Avenue)	Bradford	Horsfall Stadium	3,500
Chester	Chester	Deva Stadium	6,500
Chorley	Chorley	Victory Park	4,100
Curzon Ashton	Ashton-under-Lyne	Tameside Stadium	4,000
Darlington	Darlington	Blackwell Meadows	3,300
F.C. United of Manchester	Manchester	Broadhurst Park	4,400
Guiseley	Guiseley	Nethermoor Park	4,200
Hereford	Hereford	Edgar Street	4,913
Kidderminster Harriers	Kidderminster	Aggborough Stadium	6,238
Leamington	Leamington Spa	New Windmill Ground	2,300
Nuneaton Borough	Nuneaton	Liberty Way	4,614
Southport	Southport	Haig Avenue	6,008
Spennymoor Town	Spennymoor	The Brewery Field	3,150
Stockport County	Stockport	Edgeley Park	10,852
York City	York	Bootham Crescent	8,256

=== Personnel and sponsoring ===
Team	Manager^{1}	Captain	Kit manufacturer	Shirt Sponsor
AFC Telford United	Gavin Cowan	Shane Sutton	Hummel	Capgemini
Alfreton Town	Billy Heath	Luke Shiels	SK Kits	Impact
Altrincham	Phil Parkinson		SK Kits	J Davidson Scrap Metal
Ashton United	Jody Banim		Joma	Rol-Lite-Blinds
Blyth Spartans	Alun Armstrong	Robbie Dale	Erreà	Community Foundation
Boston United	Craig Elliott		Nike	Kia Motors
Brackley Town	Kevin Wilkin		Joma	Going Plural
Bradford (Park Avenue)	Mark Bower		Kappa	T&P Print (Home), Ideal Student Room (Away)
Chester	Anthony Johnson; Bernard Morley	Scott Burton	Puma	MBNA
Chorley	Jamie Vermiglio		Chorley Sport	Cruise 118
Curzon Ashton	John Flanagan		Jako	Bromleys
Darlington	Tommy Wright		Puma	EBAC
F.C. United of Manchester	Tom Greaves		Erreà	None
Guiseley	Marcus Bignot; Russ O'Neill		Macron	Shelving Superstore
Hereford	Marc Richards		Macron	Central Roofing
Kidderminster Harriers	Steve MacFarlane		Kappa	25 KHITC
Leamington	Paul Holleran	Tony Breeden	Puma	BPS
Nuneaton Borough	Jimmy Ginnelly	Cameron Belford	Joma	Stuart
Southport	Liam Watson		Kappa	ME Group
Spennymoor Town	Jason Ainsley		Erreà	Motif8
Stockport County	Jim Gannon		Joma	Pioneer Group
York City	Steve Watson		Avec	Benenden

=== League table ===
Pos	Team	Pld	W	D	L	GF	GA	GD	Pts	Promotion, qualification or relegation
1	Stockport County (C, P)	42	24	10	8	77	36	+41	82	Promotion to National League
2	Chorley (O, P)	42	24	9	9	83	41	+42	81	Qualification for the National League North play-off semi-finals
3	Brackley Town	42	22	11	9	72	40	+32	77	Qualification for the National League North play-off semi-finals
4	Spennymoor Town	42	22	10	10	78	48	+30	76	Qualification for the National League North play-off quarter-finals
5	Altrincham	42	20	11	11	85	56	+29	71	Qualification for the National League North play-off quarter-finals
6	Blyth Spartans	42	20	9	13	74	62	+12	69	Qualification for the National League North play-off quarter-finals
7	Bradford (Park Avenue)	42	18	11	13	71	61	+10	65	Qualification for the National League North play-off quarter-finals
8	AFC Telford United	42	17	14	11	64	55	+9	65	
9	Chester	42	16	14	12	60	62	−2	62	
10	Kidderminster Harriers	42	17	9	16	68	62	+6	60	
11	Boston United	42	17	7	18	62	60	+2	58	
12	York City	42	16	10	16	58	63	−5	58	
13	Leamington	42	13	15	14	57	60	−3	54	
14	Southport	42	13	14	15	58	55	+3	53	
15	Alfreton Town	42	13	12	17	53	67	−14	51	
16	Darlington	42	12	14	16	56	62	−6	50	
17	Hereford	42	11	16	15	47	58	−11	49	
18	Curzon Ashton	42	13	10	19	44	71	−27	49	
19	Guiseley	42	9	17	16	46	60	−14	44	
20	Ashton United (R)	42	9	8	25	43	86	−43	35	Relegation to the Northern Premier League Premier Division
21	FC United of Manchester (R)	42	8	10	24	49	82	−33	34	Relegation to the Northern Premier League Premier Division
22	Nuneaton Borough (R)	42	4	7	31	38	96	−58	19	Relegation to the Southern League Premier Division Central

Source: National League official site
Rules for classification: 1) Points; 2) Goal difference; 3) Number of goals scored; 4) Number of matches won; 5) Head-to-head results
(C) Champions; (O) Play-off winners; (P) Promoted; (R) Relegated

=== Play-offs ===
Quarter-finals
5	Altrincham	2 (7)
6	Blyth Spartans	2 (6)
4	Spennymoor Town	1
7	Bradford (Park Avenue)	0

Semi-finals
2	Chorley	1 (3)
5	Altrincham	1 (1)
3	Brackley Town	0 (4)
4	Spennymoor Town	0 (5)

Final
2	Chorley	1 (4)
4	Spennymoor Town	1 (3)

==== Quarter-finals ====
1 May 2019	Altrincham	2–2 (7–6 p)	Blyth Spartans	Altrincham
		Report		Stadium: Moss Lane; Attendance: 1,698

1 May 2019	Spennymoor Town	1–0	Bradford (Park Avenue)	Spennymoor
		Report		Stadium: The Brewery Field; Attendance: 1,509

==== Semi-finals ====
5 May 2019	Chorley	1–1 (3–1 p)	Altrincham	Chorley
	Wilson 82'	Report	Hancock 67'	Stadium: Victory Park; Attendance: 3,446; Referee: Elliott Swallow
	Penalties
	Newby (penalty missed); Blakeman (penalty missed); Meppen-Walter (penalty scored); Almond (penalty scored); Wilson (penalty scored)		(penalty missed) Moult; (penalty missed) Densmore; (penalty missed) Poole; (penalty scored) Harrop

5 May 2019	Brackley Town	0–0 (4–5 p)	Spennymoor Town	Brackley
		Report		Stadium: St. James Park; Attendance: 1,271

==== Final ====
12 May 2019

Chorley	1–1 (a.e.t.)	Spennymoor Town
Leather 102'	Report	Taylor 105'
Penalties
Newby (penalty missed); Almond (penalty missed); Meppen-Walter (penalty scored); O'Keefe (penalty scored); Carver (penalty scored); Newby (penalty scored)	4–3	Taylor (penalty missed); Anderson (penalty scored); Brogan (penalty scored); Ramshaw (penalty missed); Boyes (penalty scored); Johnson (penalty missed)

Victory Park, Chorley
Attendance: 3,594
Referee: Sam Barrott

=== Results table ===
Home \ Away	TEL	ALF	ALT	ASH	BLY	BOS	BRA	BRD	CHE	CHO	CUR	DAR	UOM	GUI	HER	KID	LEA	NUN	SOU	SPE	STO	YOR
AFC Telford United	—	0–0	1–1	2–1	1–1	1–0	2–1	0–2	3–1	1–1	3–1	3–1	1–3	1–1	1–1	0–1	4–1	3–1	1–0	2–1	1–1	2–1
Alfreton Town	1–1	—	0–7	2–0	3–1	1–1	0–1	0–1	2–2	2–1	0–1	0–0	2–3	0–1	1–1	3–3	1–2	3–1	3–1	1–7	1–1	2–3
Altrincham	3–1	3–1	—	3–0	1–1	0–2	1–2	1–1	4–0	5–3	0–2	3–3	1–2	1–1	1–1	2–1	2–2	4–0	1–0	0–2	0–1	3–0
Ashton United	3–4	0–2	1–1	—	0–3	1–1	1–5	0–2	0–3	0–5	1–2	2–2	1–0	1–0	0–0	0–1	2–1	0–0	1–2	3–0	0–6	0–2
Blyth Spartans	1–0	1–1	2–1	2–0	—	3–0	1–3	1–2	8–1	1–2	3–2	0–1	0–3	2–0	2–3	3–3	0–2	4–1	2–1	2–2	3–2	2–1
Boston United	2–2	0–1	1–2	2–1	4–0	—	1–3	2–2	0–2	0–2	4–1	0–2	2–1	1–0	3–1	0–2	1–1	2–1	1–2	0–2	1–3	2–0
Brackley Town	3–1	3–1	1–2	3–1	1–1	2–0	—	3–0	2–2	2–2	2–0	2–4	1–0	2–0	2–0	3–1	2–2	3–1	2–0	4–1	1–0	0–0
Bradford (Park Avenue)	1–2	1–1	2–3	3–2	1–1	1–0	1–0	—	2–0	1–0	2–2	2–2	2–3	1–2	1–0	1–2	2–1	1–0	2–2	1–0	1–1	1–3
Chester	2–1	3–2	1–2	4–1	2–0	4–1	0–0	5–3	—	0–0	0–1	3–1	0–0	1–1	3–0	3–1	1–1	3–2	0–0	0–0	0–6	2–2
Chorley	1–1	3–1	4–1	0–1	2–4	1–1	2–0	3–2	0–0	—	2–0	3–2	4–0	3–0	1–0	3–0	3–0	2–0	4–0	1–2	2–0	1–0
Curzon Ashton	2–1	3–2	0–6	2–4	1–3	1–3	1–1	1–1	0–3	0–1	—	1–1	3–1	1–0	0–1	1–1	1–1	0–1	0–3	0–5	0–2	1–0
Darlington	3–0	0–1	0–3	2–1	1–1	1–0	0–2	1–0	0–1	1–1	1–2	—	2–0	0–0	2–2	3–0	1–1	1–2	0–0	1–2	0–1	5–1
F.C. United of Manchester	1–2	1–1	1–2	3–4	1–2	0–3	1–1	2–2	0–2	1–4	2–0	1–2	—	3–3	2–2	0–1	0–2	0–4	1–1	1–3	1–2	3–3
Guiseley	1–1	0–1	2–2	1–1	1–3	4–5	2–1	1–5	1–1	0–2	1–0	1–0	3–0	—	1–1	0–0	1–1	2–1	0–1	1–1	1–1	1–1
Hereford	1–1	2–1	1–1	0–2	3–0	0–2	0–2	1–2	2–0	1–1	1–2	4–2	1–3	1–0	—	1–0	2–1	2–2	0–3	0–3	2–2	1–1
Kidderminster Harriers	0–0	0–1	3–2	3–3	3–1	1–2	2–0	3–0	4–1	0–4	1–1	5–2	1–2	1–2	2–1	—	1–2	4–1	1–4	2–1	2–1	1–2
Leamington	2–2	3–1	3–0	1–0	1–2	2–0	0–0	4–2	1–0	1–1	0–1	2–2	2–2	2–2	2–2	0–4	—	3–0	1–0	0–2	0–1	0–1
Nuneaton Borough	1–2	1–2	0–2	0–1	1–3	1–5	1–3	0–6	2–3	0–1	2–4	1–2	1–0	1–3	0–0	1–1	0–2	—	1–4	0–2	0–3	2–2
Southport	0–4	2–1	1–3	2–2	0–1	2–3	0–0	2–2	3–0	5–3	2–2	0–0	0–0	1–0	1–0	2–2	5–1	1–1	—	1–1	0–1	1–2
Spennymoor Town	2–3	1–1	4–4	5–0	2–2	1–0	2–1	0–2	2–0	1–0	0–0	2–2	2–0	3–2	0–2	2–1	1–0	3–1	1–1	—	1–3	3–0
Stockport County	3–2	0–1	2–0	2–1	0–1	0–2	1–1	3–0	1–1	3–0	2–0	2–0	5–1	1–1	1–1	1–0	3–1	2–2	3–2	1–0	—	3–1
York City	1–0	1–2	0–1	2–0	2–0	2–2	2–1	1–4	0–0	1–4	1–1	4–0	2–0	4–2	1–2	0–3	2–2	2–0	1–0	2–3	1–0	—

Source: National League North Match Grid
Legend: Blue = home team win; Yellow = draw; Red = away team win.
For upcoming matches, an "a" indicates there is an article about the rivalry between the two participants.

=== Managerial changes ===
Team	Outgoing manager	Manner of departure	Date of vacancy	Position in table	Incoming manager	Date of appointment
Chorley	Matt Jansen	Resigned	22 June 2018	Pre-season	Jamie Vermiglio	23 June 2018
York City	Martin Gray	Dismissed	19 August 2018		Sam Collins	20 August 2018
F.C. United of Manchester	Tom Greaves	Resigned	28 August 2018		Neil Reynolds	18 October 2018
Hereford	Peter Beadle	Dismissed	13 September 2018	12th	Marc Richards	2 October 2018
York City	Sam Collins	Mutual consent	5 January 2019		Steve Watson	10 January 2019
Darlington	Tommy Wright	Mutual consent	27 April 2019	16th	Alun Armstrong	27 May 2019

=== Top scorers ===
Rank	Player	Club	Goals
1	(England) Glen Taylor	Spennymoor Town	21
2	(Nigeria) Daniel Udoh	AFC Telford United	17
3	(England) Jake Beesley	Bradford (Park Avenue)	16
3	(England) Colby Bishop	Leamington	16
3	(England) Matthew Warburton	Stockport County	16
6	(England) Joshua Hancock	Altrincham	15
6	(Gibraltar) Reece Styche	Alfreton Town	15
6	(England) Kurt Willoughby	F.C. United of Manchester	15
9	(England) Dan Maguire	Blyth Spartans	14
9	(England) Josh Wilson	Chorley	14
10	(England) Ashley Chambers	Kidderminster Harriers	13

=== Monthly awards ===
Each month the Vanarama National League North announces their official Player of the Month and Manager of the Month.

Month	Player of the Month	Club	Manager of the Month	Club
August 2018	(England) Matty Stenson	Leamington	(England) Jamie Vermiglio	Chorley
September 2018	(England) Ed Williams	Kidderminster Harriers	(England) Jason Ainsley	Spennymoor Town
October 2018	(England) Gary Roberts	Chester	(England) Phil Parkinson	Altrincham
November 2018	(Northern Ireland) David Morgan	Southport	(England) Liam Watson	Southport

== National League South ==
National League South
- Season: 2018–19
- Champions: Torquay United
- Promoted: Torquay United; Woking
- Relegated: Weston-super-Mare; East Thurrock United; Truro City

The National League South consisted of 22 clubs.

=== Team changes ===
==== To National League South ====
Promoted from 2017–18 Isthmian League Premier Division

- Billericay Town
- Dulwich Hamlet

Promoted from 2017–18 Southern League Premier Division

- Slough Town

Relegated from 2017–18 National League

- Torquay United
- Woking

==== From National League South ====
Promoted to 2018–19 National League

- Havant & Waterlooville
- Braintree Town

Relegated to 2018–19 Isthmian League Premier Division

- Bognor Regis Town
- Whitehawk

Relegated to 2018–19 Southern League Premier Division South

- Poole Town

=== Stadia and locations ===
Locations of the 2018–19 National League South clubs (Greater London shown in more detail below)
Locations of the 2018–19 National League South clubs (Greater London)

Team	Location	Stadium	Capacity
Bath City	Bath (Twerton)	Twerton Park	8,840
Billericay Town	Billericay	New Lodge	3,500
Chelmsford City	Chelmsford	Melbourne Stadium	3,019
Chippenham Town	Chippenham	Hardenhuish Park	3,000
Concord Rangers	Canvey Island	Thames Road	3,300
Dartford	Dartford	Princes Park	4,100
Dulwich Hamlet	London	Champion Hill (began season groundsharing with Tooting & Mitcham United)	3,000
East Thurrock United	Corringham	Rookery Hill	4,000
Eastbourne Borough	Eastbourne	Priory Lane	4,151
Gloucester City	Evesham	Jubilee Stadium (groundshare with Evesham United)	3,000
Hampton & Richmond	London (Hampton)	Beveree Stadium	3,500
Hemel Hempstead Town	Hemel Hempstead	Vauxhall Road	3,152
Hungerford Town	Hungerford	Bulpit Lane	2,500
Oxford City	Oxford (Marston)	Court Place Farm	2,000
Slough Town	Slough	Arbour Park	2,000
St Albans City	St Albans	Clarence Park	4,500
Torquay United	Torquay	Plainmoor	6,500
Truro City	Truro	Plainmoor (groundshare with Torquay United	6,500
Wealdstone	London (Ruislip)	Grosvenor Vale	3,607
Welling United	London (Welling)	Park View Road	4,000
Weston-super-Mare	Weston-super-Mare	Woodspring Stadium	3,500
Woking	Woking	Kingfield Stadium	6,036

=== League table ===
Pos	Team	Pld	W	D	L	GF	GA	GD	Pts	Promotion, qualification or relegation
1	Torquay United (C, P)	42	27	7	8	93	41	+52	88	Promotion to National League
2	Woking (O, P)	42	23	9	10	76	49	+27	78	Qualification for the National League South play-off semi-finals (Note: Chelmsford City received a bye to the semi-finals, after Concord Rangers were barred from the play-offs.)
3	Welling United	42	23	7	12	70	47	+23	76	Qualification for the National League South play-off semi-finals
4	Chelmsford City	42	21	9	12	68	50	+18	72	Qualification for the National League South play-off semi-finals
5	Bath City	42	20	11	11	58	36	+22	71	Qualification for the National League South play-off quarter-finals
6	Concord Rangers	42	20	13	9	69	48	+21	70 (Note: Concord Rangers were deducted three points for infringing league rules.)	(Note: Concord Rangers were barred from the play-offs due to failing ground size regulations.)
7	Wealdstone	42	18	12	12	62	50	+12	66	Qualification for the National League South play-off quarter-finals
8	Billericay Town	42	19	8	15	72	65	+7	65	
9	St Albans City	42	18	10	14	67	64	+3	64	
10	Dartford	42	18	10	14	52	58	−6	64	
11	Slough Town	42	17	12	13	56	50	+6	63	
12	Oxford City	42	17	5	20	64	63	+1	56	
13	Chippenham Town	42	16	7	19	57	64	−7	55	
14	Dulwich Hamlet	42	13	10	19	52	65	−13	49	
15	Hampton & Richmond Borough	42	13	10	19	49	66	−17	49	
16	Hemel Hempstead Town	42	12	12	18	52	67	−15	48	
17	Gloucester City	42	12	11	19	35	54	−19	47	Transferred to National League North
18	Eastbourne Borough	42	10	12	20	52	65	−13	42	
19	Hungerford Town	42	11	9	22	45	72	−27	42	
20	Truro City (R)	42	9	12	21	63	87	−24	39	Relegation to the Southern League Premier Division South
21	East Thurrock United (R)	42	10	7	25	42	63	−21	37	Relegation to the Isthmian League Premier Division
22	Weston-super-Mare (R)	42	8	11	23	50	80	−30	35	Relegation to the Southern League Premier Division South

Source: National League official site
Rules for classification: 1) Points; 2) Goal difference; 3) Number of goals scored; 4) Number of matches won; 5) Head-to-head results
(C) Champions; (O) Play-off winners; (P) Promoted; (R) Relegated

=== Play-offs ===
Quarter-finals
5	Bath City	1
7	Wealdstone	3

Semi-finals
2	Woking	3
7	Wealdstone	2
3	Welling United	3
4	Chelmsford City	2

Final
2	Woking	1
3	Welling United	0

==== Quarter-final ====
1 May 2019	Bath City	1–3	Wealdstone	Bath
	Mann 82'	Report	Sheppard 11'; Monakana 63'; Pratt 90'	Stadium: Twerton Park; Attendance: 2,201

==== Semi-finals ====
5 May 2019	Woking	3–2	Wealdstone	Woking
	Diarra 76'; Kretzschmar 86'; Hyde 90+3'	Report	Grant 3'; Stevens 19'	Stadium: Kingfield Stadium; Attendance: 2,917; Referee: James Durkin

5 May 2019	Welling United	3–2	Chelmsford City	Welling
	Goldberg 27'; Mcdonald 33' (own goal); Kiernan 90+6' (pen.)	Report	Fenwick 44'; Giles 83'	Stadium: Park View Road; Attendance: 1,912

==== Final ====
12 May 2019

Woking	1–0	Welling United
Little 42'	Report

Kingfield Stadium, Woking
Attendance: 4,865

=== Results table ===
Home \ Away	BAT	BIL	CHE	CHI	CON	DAR	DUL	EAS	EAB	GLO	HAM	HEM	HUN	OXF	SLO	STA	TOR	TRU	WEA	WEL	WES	WOK
Bath City	—	1–2	2–0	5–0	1–1	1–2	2–1	1–0	1–0	3–0	1–0	0–1	4–1	1–0	2–0	0–3	3–2	1–1	1–1	0–2	2–0	1–1
Billericay Town	0–2	—	0–1	1–2	1–1	1–1	1–1	3–2	2–0	1–0	1–3	2–1	1–2	2–3	3–2	3–2	0–2	3–2	1–0	2–0	4–2	0–4
Chelmsford City	1–0	5–1	—	1–0	2–2	2–1	2–2	1–0	3–2	2–0	2–0	2–1	4–1	2–1	0–1	2–4	0–0	0–2	0–3	0–0	2–2	2–0
Chippenham Town	2–2	2–0	0–1	—	4–1	1–2	1–2	2–0	2–3	1–0	3–2	1–1	3–1	0–1	1–0	0–0	2–1	2–1	3–1	1–4	1–3	2–2
Concord Rangers	2–1	2–2	3–0	1–1	—	2–0	0–0	1–1	3–0	2–0	4–0	2–1	4–0	0–1	2–2	2–1	0–1	3–0	2–2	0–5	3–0	1–1
Dartford	3–0	2–1	1–0	2–1	2–1	—	2–1	2–0	3–2	2–0	3–2	1–0	2–1	3–2	2–1	3–2	3–2	2–1	4–3	1–0	2–1	2–0
Dulwich Hamlet	0–2	2–2	1–3	2–0	0–1	2–0	—	2–1	2–1	0–1	0–2	3–3	3–1	0–1	0–1	1–0	0–2	3–2	1–1	2–1	3–3	1–3
East Thurrock United	1–0	2–1	2–0	2–1	0–2	2–2	0–0	—	0–1	2–0	0–0	1–2	2–1	0–1	1–0	2–4	1–2	2–2	0–1	4–1	2–3	0–1
Eastbourne Borough	0–0	0–2	1–1	2–1	1–2	6–0	2–1	0–2	—	1–2	2–2	3–0	3–1	2–2	2–4	1–2	2–4	2–2	0–3	1–0	1–1	1–2
Gloucester City	0–0	1–4	0–0	3–2	1–2	1–2	1–1	1–0	2–2	—	0–0	1–1	0–0	1–0	1–2	0–0	0–0	0–2	0–0	0–1	1–3	3–4
Hampton & Richmond Borough	0–1	0–2	1–1	2–1	1–4	0–1	2–0	1–0	0–0	0–1	—	1–2	0–3	2–4	1–1	0–1	0–3	2–2	2–1	2–1	3–1	0–3
Hemel Hempstead Town	0–3	0–2	3–5	4–2	2–2	1–2	1–0	3–2	3–2	2–1	1–1	—	0–0	2–1	1–1	1–1	1–4	1–1	0–1	1–1	0–2	0–2
Hungerford Town	0–0	2–2	0–6	2–1	2–1	1–0	1–2	1–1	2–0	1–2	2–0	0–3	—	1–1	1–2	5–0	0–2	1–4	1–1	0–1	0–1	1–1
Oxford City	1–2	2–3	1–3	1–1	2–0	2–1	4–1	3–1	0–0	0–1	3–5	2–1	1–2	—	1–3	2–1	1–0	4–0	3–0	0–1	3–0	1–2
Slough Town	0–0	2–1	1–0	2–2	1–0	2–2	1–2	3–1	1–1	1–2	1–1	1–0	2–0	2–0	—	2–2	0–0	1–2	0–1	1–0	2–1	0–1
St Albans City	0–2	2–1	3–1	2–3	2–0	2–0	1–0	2–1	1–1	1–2	2–3	2–1	3–2	1–0	3–2	—	0–4	2–2	0–0	2–0	2–0	1–1
Torquay United	1–0	2–2	3–1	0–1	4–1	2–0	5–2	2–0	2–0	2–1	0–2	2–0	0–1	7–2	4–0	4–1	—	4–2	3–2	3–1	1–2	2–2
Truro City	1–1	0–4	0–3	1–2	1–3	3–1	3–2	1–3	2–0	1–2	0–2	1–2	2–3	2–0	3–3	2–1	1–3	—	1–2	2–2	3–3	0–1
Wealdstone	3–3	1–1	2–3	1–0	1–1	1–1	1–3	3–0	0–3	2–0	2–1	2–1	1–0	0–2	0–3	2–2	0–3	3–0	—	1–3	4–1	1–0
Welling United	2–1	0–3	2–0	2–1	0–1	2–0	2–0	2–0	1–0	3–1	4–0	1–1	3–1	3–2	2–1	2–2	2–0	5–3	1–1	—	3–1	3–3
Weston-super-Mare	0–2	2–3	0–3	0–1	1–2	3–1	1–1	1–1	0–1	0–0	0–2	1–2	0–0	1–1	2–0	2–3	2–2	1–1	0–5	0–1	—	2–4
Woking	1–3	2–1	1–1	2–0	1–2	0–1	1–2	3–0	2–0	1–2	3–1	3–1	3–0	3–2	0–1	2–1	3–3	3–1	0–2	2–0	2–1	—

Source: National League South Match Grid
Legend: Blue = home team win; Yellow = draw; Red = away team win.
For upcoming matches, an "a" indicates there is an article about the rivalry between the two participants.

=== Top scorers ===
Rank	Player	Club	Goals
1	(Northern Ireland) Jamie Reid	Torquay United	29
2	(Republic of Ireland) Rhys Murphy	Chelmsford City	25
3	(England) Kabongo Tshimanga	Oxford City	24
4	(England) Tyler Harvey	Truro City	22
5	(England) Alex Wall	Concord Rangers	21
6	(England) Moses Emmanuel	Billericay Town	17
6	(The Gambia) Saikou Janneh	Torquay United	17
6	(Antigua and Barbuda) Nathaniel Jarvis	Chippenham Town	17
9	(Ghana) Chris Dickson	Hampton & Richmond Borough	16
9	(England) Jack Midson	Concord Rangers	16

=== Monthly awards ===
Each month the Vanarama National League South announces their official Player of the Month and Manager of the Month.

Month	Player of the Month	Club	Manager of the Month	Club
August 2018	(England) Jake Robinson	Billericay Town	(England) Alan Dowson	Woking
September 2018	(England) Jack Turner	Slough Town	(England) Ian Allinson	St Albans City
October 2018	(England) Moses Emmanuel	Billericay Town	(England) Gary Johnson	Torquay United
November 2018	(England) Josh Casey	Woking	(England) Leigh Robinson	Truro City
December 2018	(England) Shaun MacDonald	Torquay United	(England) Mark Jones	Oxford City
January 2019	(England) Jack Giddens	East Thurrock United	(England) Jerry Gill	Bath City
February 2019	(England) Chris Whelpdale	Chelmsford City	(England) Jamie Coyle (England) Adam Flanagan	Dartford
March 2019	(England) Marvel Ekpiteta	Hungerford Town	(England) Neil Baker (England) Jon Underwood	Slough Town
April 2019	(France) Fabien Robert	Gloucester City	(England) Mike Cook	Gloucester City

== Step 3 Super Playoffs ==
With the introduction of a new division at Step 3 of the National League System, an altered promotion playoff process was implemented for the 2018–19 season for clubs to reach the National Leagues North and South for the 2019–20 season.

As per prior seasons, 3 teams were relegated each from the North and South leaving 6 vacancies to fill. Each of the winners of the four Step 3 leagues were automatically promoted to the National Leagues North & South for 2019–20.

The Champions of the Step 3 leagues are:

- Isthmian League Premier Division: Dorking Wanderers
- Northern Premier League Premier Division: Farsley Celtic
- Southern Premier League Premier Division Central: Kettering Town
- Southern Premier League Premier Division South: Weymouth

Each of the four leagues ran a playoff involving the teams finishing from second to fifth. The winners of these playoffs proceeded to the Super Playoffs. The playoff winners are:

- Isthmian League Premier Division: Tonbridge Angels
- Northern Premier League Premier Division: Warrington Town
- Southern Premier League Premier Division Central: King's Lynn Town
- Southern Premier League Premier Division South: Metropolitan Police

The winners of the following two fixtures were promoted:

11 May 2019	Warrington Town	2–3 (a.e.t.)	King's Lynn Town
15:00

11 May 2019	Metropolitan Police	2–3 (a.e.t.)	Tonbridge Angels
15:00
