= 2015–16 Swindon Town F.C. season =

Swindon Town
2015–16 season
- Chairman: Lee Power
- Manager: Mark Cooper (until 17 October); Lee Power (caretaker; from 18 October, until 2 November); Martin Ling (from 3 November, until 29 December); Luke Williams (caretaker; from 29 December)
- Stadium: County Ground
- League One: 15th
- FA Cup: 1st Round (Eliminated by Rochdale)
- League Cup: 1st Round (Eliminated by Exeter City)
- JPT: 2nd Round (Eliminated by Oxford United)
- Top goalscorer: League: Nicky Ajose (24); All: Nicky Ajose (25)
- Highest home attendance: 9,240 (vs. Wigan Athletic, 25 March 2016)
- Lowest home attendance: 4,693 (vs. Exeter City, 11 August 2015)
| Home colours | Away colours |

The 2015–16 season was Swindon Town's 137th season in their existence and their fourth consecutive season in League One. Along with competing in League One, the club also participated in the FA Cup, League Cup and Football League Trophy. The season covered the period from 1 July 2015 to 30 June 2016.

== Season events ==
=== Pre-season ===
==== June ====
- 1 June 2015 – The exits of Harry Agombar, Josue Antonio, George Barker, Jack Barthram, Matty Jones, Cameron Belford, Wes Foderingham, Darren Ward, Connor Waldon and Andy Williams were confirmed.
- 30 June 2015 – The club signed a formal agreement with Calne Town Council to use the Beversbrook Sports Facility for training while the club sought a site closer to Swindon.

==== July ====
- 2 July 2015 – Anton Rodgers signed a new two-year deal with the club.
- 2 July 2015 – Former Liverpool defender Brandon Ormonde-Ottewill signed a two-year deal.
- 12 July 2015 – Liverpool defender Kevin Stewart signed a season-long loan deal.
- 13 July 2015 – The club were charged by the Football Association over the signing of Redditch United forward Jermaine Hylton.
- 13 July 2015 – Drissa Traoré signed a one-year contract with the club.
- 21 July 2015 – Reported interest for Bournemouth for Will Randall was rebuffed.
- 30 July 2015 – Fabien Robert signed a one-year contract with the club.

==== August ====
- 3 August 2015 – Southampton defender Jordan Turnbull returned to the club by signing a season-long loan deal.
- 4 August 2015 – Former Maidstone United midfielder Ellis Iandolo signed a professional deal.
- 4 August 2015 – Town owner Lee Power announced that a price has been agreed on land within the borough for a multi-million-pound training facility for the club.
- 4 August 2015 – Lawrence Vigouroux became the third Liverpool player to sign a season-long loan deal.
- 6 August 2015 – Non-League defender James Brophy signed a one-year contract after a successful trial period.
- 8 August 2015 – Former Brighton & Hove Albion and cousin of former England midfielder Gareth Barry, Bradley Barry, signed a one-year contract after a successful trial period.
- 10 August 2015 – Youth team graduate Josh Cooke joined Cheltenham Town on loan until January 2016.
- 11 August 2015 – Swindon were eliminated from the League Cup first round, losing 2–1 to League side Exeter City.
- 21 August 2015 – Town signed Jordan Stewart from Northern Ireland side Glentoran.

==== September ====
- 1 September 2015 – Nathan Byrne left to join Wolverhampton Wanderers for an undisclosed fee.
- 1 September 2015 – Inverness Caledonian Thistle signed Town forward Miles Storey on loan.
- 1 September 2015 – Wes Thomas joined the club from Birmingham City on loan until January 2016.
- 2 September 2015 – Former Town loan player Nicky Ajose rejoined the club on a permanent basis after his contract with Leeds United was terminated.
- 4 September 2015 – Swindon Town recruit Frenchman Jérémy Balmy and Estonia international Henrik Ojamaa until the end of the season.
- 11 September 2015 – Louis Thompson rejoined the club on a youth loan from Norwich City.
- 28 September 2015 – Lawrence Vigouroux was recalled by Liverpool due to a disciplinary matter.
- 29 September 2015 – Lawrence Vigouroux resumed his loan spell at Swindon.

==== October ====
- 2 October 2015 – Momar Bangoura signed a short-term contract with the club.
- 17 October 2015 – The club parted company with manager, Mark Cooper.

==== November ====
- 3 November 2015 – Former player Martin Ling was appointed manager of Swindon Town.
- 10 November 2015 – Ross Embleton joined the backroom staff as First Team Coach.
- 27 November 2015 – Centre-forward Jamie Calvin signed a one-year contract.

==== December ====
- 28 December 2015 – Momar Bangoura was released upon the completion of his short-term contract.
- 29 December 2015 – Martin Ling resigned as manager of Swindon Town citing health reasons.

==== January ====
- 7 January 2016 – Loan players Louis Thompson, Ben Gladwin, Adam El-Abd and Wes Thomas were all recalled by their parent clubs.
- 7 January 2016 – Henrik Ojamaa left the club by mutual consent.
- 8 January 2016 – Liverpool manager Jürgen Klopp recalled Kevin Stewart from his season-long loan deal at the club.
- 12 January 2016 – Swindon Town youth graduate Will Randall joined Wolverhampton Wanderers for an undisclosed fee.
- 15 January 2016 – Michael Doughty signed on a one-month loan deal from Queens Park Rangers.
- 21 January 2016 – Luke Williams was confirmed as Swindon Town manager until the end of the season.

==== February ====
- 16 February 2016 – Jamie Sendles-White signed a permanent deal until the end of the season.

==== March ====
- 9 March 2016 – Luke Williams signed a 5-year contract extension.

==== April ====
- 9 April 2016 – The club suspended Drissa Traore, Brandon Ormonde-Ottewill and Jérémy Balmy and investigate reports that they inhaled nitrous oxide on the live social media app, Periscope.
- 14 April 2016 – Norwich City goalkeeper Jake Kean joined on an emergency loan deal.

== First Team ==
As of game played on 17 April 2016

| No. | Name | Position | Nationality | Place of Birth | Date of Birth | Club caps | Club goals | Int. caps | Int. goals | Previous club | Notes |
Goalkeepers
| 1 | Lawrence Vigouroux | GK | (Chile) | (England) London | 19 November 1993 | 36 | 0 | 0 | 0 | Liverpool | On loan from Liverpool |
| 12 | Jake Kean | GK | (England) | Derby | 4 February 1991 | 3 | 0 | 0 | 0 | Norwich City | On loan from Norwich City |
| 25 | Tyrell Belford | GK | (England) | Nuneaton | 6 May 1994 | 22 | 0 | 0 | 0 | Liverpool | |
| 32 | Will Henry | GK | (England) | Bristol | 6 July 1998 | 2 | 0 | 0 | 0 | Youth team scholar | |
| 33 | Connor Johns | GK | (England) | Mansfield | 22 June 1998 | 0 | 0 | 0 | 0 | Youth team scholar | |
Defenders
| 2 | Nathan Thompson | RB | (England) | Chester | 9 November 1990 | 151 | 2 | 0 | 0 | Youth team graduate | Club captain |
| 3 | Brandon Ormonde-Ottewill | LB/LWB | (England) | London | 21 December 1995 | 30 | 1 | 0 | 0 | Arsenal | |
| 5 | Jordan Williams | CB/DM | (Wales) | Bangor | 6 November 1995 | 10 | 0 | 0 | 0 | Liverpool | On loan from Liverpool |
| 6 | Jordan Turnbull | CB | (England) | Trowbridge | 30 October 1994 | 98 | 1 | 0 | 0 | Southampton | On loan from Southampton |
| 15 | James Brophy | LB | (England) | London | 25 July 1994 | 31 | 0 | 0 | 0 | Edgware Town | |
| 21 | Jamie Sendles-White | CB | (Northern Ireland) | (England) Kingston upon Thames | 10 April 1994 | 2 | 0 | 0 | 0 | Hamilton Academical | |
| 27 | Bradley Barry | RB | (England) | Hastings | 13 February 1995 | 38 | 0 | 0 | 0 | Brighton & Hove Albion | |
| 29 | Raphael Rossi Branco | CB | (Brazil) | Campinas | 25 July 1990 | 91 | 4 | 0 | 0 | Whitehawk | Vice captain |
| 34 | Adam El-Abd | CB | (Egypt) | (England) Brighton | 11 September 1984 | 14 | 0 | 7 | 0 | Bristol City | On loan from Bristol City |
Midfielders
| 4 | Fabien Robert | CM | (France) | Hennebont | 6 January 1989 | 38 | 4 | 0 | 0 | Lorient | |
| 7 | Drissa Traoré | CM | (Ivory Coast) | Bouaké | 25 March 1992 | 26 | 0 | 0 | 0 | Notts County | |
| 8 | Yaser Kasim | CM | (Iraq) | Karrada | 10 May 1991 | 115 | 6 | 17 | 3 | Brighton & Hove Albion | |
| 10 | Nathan Byrne | RM | (England) | St Albans | 5 June 1992 | 107 | 11 | 0 | 0 | Tottenham Hotspur | |
| 11 | Kevin Stewart | CM/RB | (England) | Enfield | 7 September 1993 | 7 | 0 | 0 | 0 | Liverpool | On loan from Liverpool |
| 12 | Momar Bangoura | DM | (Senegal) | Dakar | 24 February 1994 | 2 | 0 | 0 | 0 | Olympique de Marseille | |
| 14 | Michael Doughty | CM | (Wales) | (England) London | 30 November 1985 | 20 | 5 | 0 | 0 | Queens Park Rangers | On loan from Queens Park Rangers |
| 16 | Jordan Stewart | AM/CF | (Northern Ireland) | Belfast | 31 March 1995 | 1 | 0 | 0 | 0 | Glentoran | |
| 17 | Ben Gladwin | CM | (England) | Reading | 8 June 1992 | 70 | 13 | 0 | 0 | Queens Park Rangers | On loan from Queens Park Rangers |
| 19 | Louis Thompson | CM | (Wales) | (England) Dover | 19 December 1994 | 107 | 7 | 0 | 0 | Norwich City | On loan from Norwich City |
| 19 | Jérémy Balmy | LM/CF | (France) | Melun | 19 April 1994 | 14 | 0 | 0 | 0 | Oxford United | |
| 21 | Will Randall | RM | (England) | Swindon | 2 May 1997 | 11 | 0 | 0 | 0 | Youth team graduate | |
| 22 | Lee Marshall | RM | (England) | Gloucester | 21 November 1996 | 6 | 0 | 0 | 0 | Youth team graduate | |
| 26 | Anton Rodgers | CM | (Republic of Ireland) | (England) Reading | 26 January 1993 | 52 | 5 | 0 | 0 | Oldham Athletic | |
| 28 | Ellis Iandolo | AM/CF | (England) | Chatham | 22 August 1997 | 13 | 0 | 0 | 0 | Maidstone United | |
| 31 | Tom Smith | CM | (England) | Swindon | 23 February 1998 | 3 | 1 | 0 | 0 | Youth team scholar | |
| 34 | Jake Evans | CM/LM | (England) | Swindon | 8 April 1998 | 1 | 0 | 0 | 0 | Youth team scholar | |
| 35 | Jordan Young | CM | (Scotland) | (England) Chippenham | 31 July 1999 | 3 | 1 | 0 | 0 | Youth team graduate | |
Forwards
| 9 | Michael Smith | CF | (England) | Wallsend | 17 October 1991 | 72 | 26 | 0 | 0 | Charlton Athletic | |
| 10 | Nicky Ajose | CF | (England) | Bury | 7 October 1991 | 61 | 35 | 0 | 0 | Leeds United | |
| 14 | Wes Thomas | CF | (England) | Barking | 23 January 1987 | 6 | 2 | 0 | 0 | Birmingham City | On loan from Birmingham City |
| 23 | Josh Cooke | CF | (England) | | 4 February 1997 | 4 | 0 | 0 | 0 | Youth team graduate | |
| 20 | Jonathan Obika | CF | (England) | Enfield | 12 September 1990 | 77 | 22 | 0 | 0 | Tottenham Hotspur | |
| 24 | Jermaine Hylton | CF | (England) | Birmingham | 28 June 1993 | 31 | 1 | 0 | 0 | Redditch United | |
| 30 | Miles Storey | CF | (England) | West Bromwich | 4 January 1994 | 39 | 6 | 0 | 0 | Youth team graduate | On loan at Inverness Caledonian Thistle |
| 32 | Henrik Ojamaa | CF | (Estonia) | Tallinn | 20 May 1991 | 11 | 0 | 23 | 0 | Legia Warsaw | |
| 37 | Jamie Calvin | CF | (England) | Watford | 8 October 1995 | 0 | 0 | 0 | 0 | Hampton & Richmond Borough | |

NOTE: Players in italics departed the club permanently before the end of the 2015–16 season.

=== Transfers ===
==== In ====
| Date from | Position | Nationality | Name | From | Fee | Ref. |
|---|---|---|---|---|---|---|
| 2 July 2015 | LB | ENG | Brandon Ormonde-Ottewill | Arsenal | Free transfer | |
| 13 July 2015 | DM | CIV | Drissa Traoré | Notts County | Free transfer | |
| 30 July 2015 | AM | FRA | Fabien Robert | Lorient | Free transfer | |
| 4 August 2015 | AM | ENG | Ellis Iandolo | Maidstone United | Free transfer | |
| 6 August 2015 | LB/LW | ENG | James Brophy | Free agent | Free transfer | |
| 11 August 2015 | RB | ENG | Bradley Barry | Free agent | Free transfer | |
| 21 August 2015 | AM | NIR | Jordan Stewart | Glentoran | £50,000 | |
| 2 September 2015 | CF | ENG | Nicky Ajose | Leeds United | Free transfer | |
| 4 September 2015 | CF | FRA | Jérémy Balmy | Oxford United | Free transfer | |
| 4 September 2015 | CF | EST | Henrik Ojamaa | Legia Warsaw | Free transfer | |
| 2 October 2015 | DM | SEN | Momar Bangoura | Olympique de Marseille | Free transfer | |
| 27 November 2015 | CF | ENG | Jamie Calvin | Hampton & Richmond Borough | Free transfer | |
| 16 February 2016 | DF | NIR | Jamie Sendles-White | Hamilton Academicals | Free transfer | |

Total spending: ▼£50,000

==== Out ====
| Date from | Position | Nationality | Name | To | Fee | Ref. |
|---|---|---|---|---|---|---|
| 28 May 2015 | MF | ENG | Ben Gladwin | Queens Park Rangers | Undisclosed | |
| 28 May 2015 | MF | AUS | Massimo Luongo | Queens Park Rangers | Undisclosed | |
| 1 July 2015 | MF | ENG | Harry Agombar | Grays Athletic (Note: Agombar later signed for Grays Athletic.) | Released | |
| 1 July 2015 | DF | ENG | Josue Antonio | Free Agent | Released | |
| 1 July 2015 | FW | ENG | George Barker | Gosport Borough (Note: Waldon later signed for Gosport Borough.) | Released | |
| 1 July 2015 | DF | ENG | Jack Barthram | Cheltenham Town (Note: Barthram later signed for Cheltenham Town.) | Released | |
| 1 July 2015 | GK | ENG | Cameron Belford | Wrexham (Note: Belford later signed for Wrexham.) | Released | |
| 1 July 2015 | GK | ENG | Wes Foderingham | Rangers (Note: Foderingham later signed for Rangers.) | Released | |
| 1 July 2015 | DF | ENG | Matty Jones | Chippenham Town (Note: Jones later signed for Chippenham Town.) | Released | |
| 1 July 2015 | FW | ENG | Connor Waldon | Swindon Supermarine (Note: Waldon later signed for Swindon Supermarine.) | Released | |
| 1 July 2015 | DF | ENG | Darren Ward | Yeovil Town (Note: Ward later signed for Yeovil Town.) | Released | |
| 1 July 2015 | FW | ENG | Andy Williams | Doncaster Rovers (Note: Williams later signed for Doncaster Rovers.) | Released | |
| 1 September 2015 | DF | ENG | Nathan Byrne | Wolverhampton Wanderers | Undisclosed | |
| 28 December 2015 | MF | SEN | Momar Bangoura | Free Agent | Released | |
| 5 January 2016 | CF | EST | Henrik Ojamaa | Wacker Innsbruck | Free Transfer | |
| 12 January 2016 | MF | ENG | Will Randall | Wolverhampton Wanderers | Undisclosed | |

==== Loans in ====
| Date from | Position | Nationality | Name | From | Date until | Ref. |
|---|---|---|---|---|---|---|
| 10 July 2015 | DM | WAL | Jordan Williams | Liverpool | 30 June 2016 | |
| 11 July 2015 | RB | ENG | Kevin Stewart | Liverpool | 8 January 2016 | |
| 3 August 2015 | CB | ENG | Jordan Turnbull | Southampton | 30 June 2016 | |
| 4 August 2015 | GK | CHI | Lawrence Vigouroux | Liverpool | 30 June 2016 | |
| 1 September 2015 | CF | ENG | Wes Thomas | Birmingham City | 4 January 2016 | |
| 11 September 2015 | CM | WAL | Louis Thompson | Norwich City | 30 June 2016 | |
| 9 October 2015 | CB | EGY | Adam El-Abd | Bristol City | 4 January 2016 | |
| 9 October 2015 | CM | ENG | Ben Gladwin | Queens Park Rangers | 4 January 2016 | |
| 15 January 2016 | CM | WAL | Michael Doughty | Queens Park Rangers | 13 February 2016 | |
| 14 April 2016 | GK | ENG | Jake Kean | Norwich City | 21 April 2016 | |

==== Loans out ====
| Date from | Position | Nationality | Name | To | End Date | Ref. |
|---|---|---|---|---|---|---|
| 10 August 2015 | ST | ENG | Josh Cooke | Cheltenham Town | 15 September 2015 | |
| 1 September 2015 | ST | ENG | Michael Smith | Barnsley | 4 January 2016 | |
| 1 September 2015 | ST | ENG | Miles Storey | Inverness Caledonian Thistle | 30 June 2016 | |
| 2 October 2015 | ST | ENG | Josh Cooke | Gloucester City | 4 January 2016 | |
| 1 February 2016 | ST | ENG | Michael Smith | Portsmouth | 30 June 2016 | |
| 24 March 2016 | AM | NIR | Jordan Stewart | Grimsby Town | 22 April 2016 | |

== Squad statistics ==
As of 8 May 2016

=== Appearances, goals and cards ===
| No. | Pos | Nat | Player | Total | | League One | | FA Cup | | League Cup | | JP Trophy | |
| No. | Pos | Nat | Player | Apps | Goals | Apps | Goals | Apps | Goals | Apps | Goals | Apps | Goals |
|---|---|---|---|---|---|---|---|---|---|---|---|---|---|
| 1 | GK | (Chile) CHI | Lawrence Vigouroux (on loan from Liverpool) | 36 | 0 | 33+0 | 0 | 1+0 | 0 | 1+0 | 0 | 1+0 | 0 |
| 2 | DF | (England) ENG | Nathan Thompson | 24 | 1 | 22+1 | 1 | 0+0 | 0 | 1+0 | 0 | 0+0 | 0 |
| 3 | DF | (England) ENG | Brandon Ormonde-Ottewill | 30 | 1 | 28+0 | 1 | 0+0 | 0 | 1+0 | 0 | 1+0 | 0 |
| 4 | MF | (France) FRA | Fabien Robert | 38 | 4 | 23+12 | 4 | 0+1 | 0 | 1+0 | 0 | 1+0 | 0 |
| 6 | DF | (England) ENG | Jordan Turnbull (on loan from Southampton) | 46 | 0 | 42+0 | 0 | 1+0 | 0 | 1+0 | 0 | 2+0 | 0 |
| 7 | MF | (Ivory Coast) CIV | Drissa Traoré | 26 | 0 | 15+9 | 0 | 0+0 | 0 | 0+0 | 0 | 2+0 | 0 |
| 8 | MF | (Iraq) IRQ | Yaser Kasim | 29 | 1 | 24+3 | 1 | 1+0 | 0 | 1+0 | 0 | 0+0 | 0 |
| 9 | FW | (England) ENG | Michael Smith | 5 | 0 | 4+1 | 0 | 0+0 | 0 | 0+0 | 0 | 0+0 | 0 |
| 10 | FW | (England) ENG | Nicky Ajose | 40 | 25 | 38+0 | 24 | 1+0 | 1 | 0+0 | 0 | 1+0 | 0 |
| 14 | MF | (Wales) WAL | Michael Doughty (on loan from Queens Park Rangers) | 20 | 5 | 20+0 | 5 | 0+0 | 0 | 0+0 | 0 | 0+0 | 0 |
| 15 | DF | (England) ENG | James Brophy | 31 | 0 | 16+12 | 0 | 0+0 | 0 | 0+1 | 0 | 2+0 | 0 |
| 16 | FW | (Northern Ireland) NIR | Jordan Stewart | 1 | 0 | 0+1 | 0 | 0+0 | 0 | 0+0 | 0 | 0+0 | 0 |
| 18 | MF | (Wales) WAL | Louis Thompson (on loan from Norwich City) | 29 | 2 | 23+5 | 2 | 1+0 | 0 | 0+0 | 0 | 0+0 | 0 |
| 19 | MF | (France) FRA | Jérémy Balmy | 13 | 0 | 1+11 | 0 | 0+0 | 0 | 0+0 | 0 | 0+1 | 0 |
| 20 | FW | (England) ENG | Jonathan Obika | 35 | 12 | 27+5 | 11 | 1+0 | 0 | 1+0 | 1 | 1+0 | 0 |
| 21 | FW | (Northern Ireland) NIR | Jamie Sendles-White | 10 | 0 | 8+2 | 0 | 0+0 | 0 | 0+0 | 0 | 0+0 | 0 |
| 22 | MF | (England) ENG | Lee Marshall | 3 | 0 | 0+2 | 0 | 0+0 | 0 | 0+0 | 0 | 1+0 | 0 |
| 23 | FW | (England) ENG | Josh Cooke | 2 | 0 | 0+2 | 0 | 0+0 | 0 | 0+0 | 0 | 0+0 | 0 |
| 24 | FW | (England) ENG | Jermaine Hylton | 18 | 0 | 8+8 | 0 | 0+1 | 0 | 0+0 | 0 | 1+0 | 0 |
| 25 | GK | (England) ENG | Tyrell Belford | 9 | 0 | 8+0 | 0 | 0+0 | 0 | 0+0 | 0 | 1+0 | 0 |
| 26 | MF | (Ireland) EIR | Anton Rodgers | 39 | 3 | 29+7 | 2 | 1+0 | 0 | 0+0 | 0 | 2+0 | 1 |
| 27 | DF | (England) ENG | Bradley Barry | 37 | 0 | 34+0 | 0 | 1+0 | 0 | 0+0 | 0 | 2+0 | 0 |
| 28 | MF | (England) ENG | Ellis Iandolo | 13 | 0 | 6+6 | 0 | 0+0 | 0 | 0+0 | 0 | 0+1 | 0 |
| 29 | DF | (Brazil) BRA | Raphael Rossi Branco | 40 | 1 | 36+0 | 1 | 1+0 | 0 | 1+0 | 0 | 2+0 | 0 |
| 31 | MF | (England) ENG | Tom Smith | 2 | 1 | 0+1 | 1 | 0+0 | 0 | 0+0 | 0 | 0+1 | 0 |
| 32 | GK | (England) ENG | Will Henry | 2 | 0 | 2+0 | 0 | 0+0 | 0 | 0+0 | 0 | 0+0 | 0 |
| 33 | GK | (England) ENG | Connor Johns | 0 | 0 | 0+0 | 0 | 0+0 | 0 | 0+0 | 0 | 0+0 | 0 |
| 34 | MF | (England) ENG | Jake Evans | 1 | 0 | 0+1 | 0 | 0+0 | 0 | 0+0 | 0 | 0+0 | 0 |
| 35 | MF | (Scotland) SCO | Jordan Young | 3 | 1 | 0+3 | 1 | 0+0 | 0 | 0+0 | 0 | 0+0 | 0 |
| 37 | FW | (England) ENG | Jamie Calvin | 0 | 0 | 0+0 | 0 | 0+0 | 0 | 0+0 | 0 | 0+0 | 0 |
| 38 | FW | (England) ENG | Scott Twine | 0 | 0 | 0+0 | 0 | 0+0 | 0 | 0+0 | 0 | 0+0 | 0 |
Players who are contracted to Swindon Town but are currently out on loan:
| 30 | FW | (England) ENG | Miles Storey | 2 | 0 | 0+2 | 0 | 0+0 | 0 | 0+0 | 0 | 0+0 | 0 |
Players who were contracted to Swindon Town but have since departed on a permanent basis:
| 5 | DF | (Wales) WAL | Jordan Williams | 10 | 0 | 9+0 | 0 | 0+0 | 0 | 1+0 | 0 | 0+0 | 0 |
| 10 | MF | (England) ENG | Nathan Byrne | 6 | 3 | 5+0 | 3 | 0+0 | 0 | 1+0 | 0 | 0+0 | 0 |
| 11 | MF | (England) ENG | Kevin Stewart | 7 | 0 | 3+2 | 0 | 0+0 | 0 | 1+0 | 0 | 1+0 | 0 |
| 12 | GK | (England) ENG | Jake Kean | 3 | 0 | 3+0 | 0 | 0+0 | 0 | 0+0 | 0 | 0+0 | 0 |
| 12 | MF | (Senegal) SEN | Momar Bangoura | 2 | 0 | 1+0 | 0 | 0+0 | 0 | 0+0 | 0 | 0+1 | 0 |
| 14 | FW | (England) ENG | Wes Thomas | 6 | 2 | 5+1 | 2 | 0+0 | 0 | 0+0 | 0 | 0+0 | 0 |
| 17 | MF | (England) ENG | Ben Gladwin | 13 | 2 | 13+0 | 2 | 0+0 | 0 | 0+0 | 0 | 0+0 | 0 |
| 21 | MF | (England) ENG | Will Randall | 6 | 0 | 0+4 | 0 | 0+0 | 0 | 0+1 | 0 | 1+0 | 0 |
| 32 | FW | (Estonia) EST | Henrik Ojamaa | 11 | 0 | 7+2 | 0 | 1+0 | 0 | 0+0 | 0 | 0+1 | 0 |
| 34 | DF | (Egypt) EGY | Adam El-Abd | 14 | 0 | 13+0 | 0 | 1+0 | 0 | 0+0 | 0 | 0+0 | 0 |

=== Goal scorers ===
| Rank | Name | L1 | FAC | FLC | FLT | Total |
|---|---|---|---|---|---|---|
| 1 | Nicky Ajose | 24 | 1 | 0 | 0 | 25 |
| 2 | Jonathan Obika | 11 | 0 | 1 | 0 | 12 |
| 3 | Michael Doughty | 5 | 0 | 0 | 0 | 5 |
| 4 | Fabien Robert | 4 | 0 | 0 | 0 | 4 |
| 5 | Nathan Byrne | 3 | 0 | 0 | 0 | 3 |
| 6 | Anton Rodgers | 2 | 0 | 0 | 1 | 3 |
| 7 | Ben Gladwin | 2 | 0 | 0 | 0 | 2 |
| 8 | Wes Thomas | 2 | 0 | 0 | 0 | 2 |
| 9 | Louis Thompson | 2 | 0 | 0 | 0 | 2 |
| 10 | Raphael Rossi Branco | 1 | 0 | 0 | 0 | 1 |
| 11 | Yaser Kasim | 1 | 0 | 0 | 0 | 1 |
| 12 | Brandon Ormonde-Ottewill | 1 | 0 | 0 | 0 | 1 |
| 13 | Tom Smith | 1 | 0 | 0 | 0 | 1 |
| 14 | Nathan Thompson | 1 | 0 | 0 | 0 | 1 |
| 14 | Jordan Young | 1 | 0 | 0 | 0 | 1 |
| – | Own goals | 2 | 0 | 0 | 0 | 2 |

=== Clean sheets ===
| Rank | Name | L1 | FAC | FLC | FLT | Total |
|---|---|---|---|---|---|---|
| 1 | Lawrence Vigouroux | 4 | 0 | 0 | 0 | 4 |
| 2 | Tyrell Belford | 1 | 0 | 0 | 0 | 1 |
| 3 | Jake Kean | 1 | 0 | 0 | 0 | 1 |
| 4 | Will Henry | 1 | 0 | 0 | 0 | 1 |

=== Disciplinary record ===
| Name | L1 | | FAC | | FLC | | FLT | | Total | |
| Name | Yellow card | Red card | Yellow card | Red card | Yellow card | Red card | Yellow card | Red card | Yellow card | Red card |
|---|---|---|---|---|---|---|---|---|---|---|
| Jérémy Balmy | 2 | 0 | 0 | 0 | 0 | 0 | 0 | 0 | 2 | 0 |
| Bradley Barry | 8 | 0 | 0 | 0 | 0 | 0 | 0 | 0 | 8 | 0 |
| Raphael Rossi Branco | 8 | 0 | 1 | 0 | 0 | 0 | 0 | 0 | 9 | 0 |
| James Brophy | 2 | 0 | 0 | 0 | 0 | 0 | 2 | 0 | 4 | 0 |
| Nathan Byrne | 1 | 0 | 0 | 0 | 0 | 0 | 0 | 0 | 1 | 0 |
| Michael Doughty | 3 | 0 | 0 | 0 | 0 | 0 | 0 | 0 | 3 | 0 |
| Adam El-Abd | 4 | 0 | 0 | 0 | 0 | 0 | 0 | 0 | 4 | 0 |
| Ben Gladwin | 2 | 0 | 0 | 0 | 0 | 0 | 0 | 0 | 2 | 0 |
| Jermaine Hylton | 1 | 0 | 0 | 0 | 0 | 0 | 0 | 0 | 1 | 0 |
| Ellis Iandolo | 1 | 0 | 0 | 0 | 0 | 0 | 0 | 0 | 1 | 0 |
| Yaser Kasim | 5 | 0 | 1 | 0 | 0 | 0 | 0 | 0 | 6 | 0 |
| Brandon Ormonde-Ottewill | 3 | 1 | 0 | 0 | 0 | 0 | 0 | 0 | 3 | 1 |
| Fabien Robert | 2 | 0 | 1 | 0 | 0 | 0 | 0 | 0 | 3 | 0 |
| Anton Rodgers | 3 | 0 | 0 | 0 | 0 | 0 | 0 | 0 | 3 | 0 |
| Jamie Sendles-White | 2 | 0 | 0 | 0 | 0 | 0 | 0 | 0 | 2 | 0 |
| Kevin Stewart | 0 | 0 | 0 | 0 | 1 | 0 | 0 | 0 | 1 | 0 |
| Louis Thompson | 7 | 1 | 1 | 0 | 0 | 0 | 0 | 0 | 8 | 1 |
| Nathan Thompson | 4 | 1 | 0 | 0 | 0 | 0 | 0 | 0 | 4 | 1 |
| Drissa Traoré | 3 | 0 | 0 | 0 | 0 | 0 | 0 | 0 | 3 | 0 |
| Jordan Turnbull | 4 | 0 | 0 | 0 | 0 | 0 | 1 | 1 | 5 | 1 |
| Lawrence Vigouroux | 4 | 0 | 0 | 0 | 0 | 0 | 0 | 0 | 4 | 0 |
| Jordan Williams | 1 | 0 | 0 | 0 | 0 | 0 | 0 | 0 | 1 | 0 |

==== Suspensions served ====
| Player | Reason | Opponents Missed |
|---|---|---|
| Jordan Turnbull | Violent conduct | Peterborough United (H), Millwall (A), Oldham Athletic (H) |
| Raphael Rossi Branco | 5 Bookings | Chesterfield (A) |
| Raphael Rossi Branco | Red Card | Burton Albion (A) |
| Nathan Thompson | Professional Foul | Scunthorpe United (A), Fleetwood Town (H), Oldham Athletic (A) |
| Louis Thompson | Two Yellow Cards | Shrewsbury Town (H) |
| Brandon Ormonde-Ottewill | Violent Conduct | Shrewsbury Town (H) |

== Competitions ==
=== Summary ===
| Games played | 50 (46 League One, 1 FA Cup, 1 League Cup, 2 League Trophy) |
| Games won | 16 (15 League One, 0 FA Cup, 0 League Cup, 1 League Trophy) |
| Games drawn | 11 (11 League One, 0 FA Cup, 0 League Cup, 0 League Trophy) |
| Games lost | 22 (19 League One, 1 FA Cup, 1 League Cup, 1 League Trophy) |
| Goals scored | 66 (64 League One, 1 FA Cup, 1 League Cup, 1 League Trophy) |
| Goals conceded | 79 (71 League One, 3 FA Cup, 2 League Cup, 3 League Trophy) |
| Goal difference (League One) | -8 |
| Clean sheets | 8 (8 League One, 0 FA Cup, 0 League Cup, 0 League Trophy) |
| Yellow cards | 88 (80 League One, 4 FA Cup, 1 League Cup, 3 League Trophy) |
| Red cards | 5 (4 League One, 0 FA Cup, 0 League Cup, 1 League Trophy) |
| Worst discipline | Bradley Barry |
| Best result | 4-0 (vs. Chesterfield) (A) |
| Worst result | 0-6 (vs. Scunthorpe United) (A) |
| Most appearances | 46 Jordan Turnbull (all competitions) |
| Top scorer | 25 Nicky Ajose (all competitions) |
| Points | 59 |

=== Score overview ===
| Opposition | Home score | Away score | Double |
|---|---|---|---|
| Barnsley | 0–1 | 1–4 | No |
| Blackpool | 3–2 | 0–1 | No |
| Bradford City | 4–1 | 0–1 | No |
| Burton Albion | 0–1 | 0–1 | No |
| Bury | 0–1 | 2–2 | No |
| Chesterfield | 1–0 | 4–0 | Yes |
| Colchester United | 1–2 | 4–1 | No |
| Coventry City | 2–2 | 0–0 | No |
| Crewe Alexandra | 4–3 | 3–1 | Yes |
| Doncaster Rovers | 2–0 | 2–2 | No |
| Fleetwood Town | 1–1 | 1-5 | No |
| Gillingham | 1–3 | 0–0 | No |
| Millwall | 2–2 | 0–2 | No |
| Oldham Athletic | 1–2 | 0–2 | No |
| Peterborough United | 1–2 | 2–1 | No |
| Port Vale | 2–2 | 0–1 | No |
| Rochdale | 2–1 | 2–2 | No |
| Scunthorpe United | 2–1 | 0–6 | No |
| Sheffield United | 0–2 | 1–1 | No |
| Shrewsbury Town | 3–0 | 1–0 | Yes |
| Southend United | 4–2 | 1–0 | Yes |
| Walsall | 2–1 | 1–1 | No |
| Wigan Athletic | 1-4 | 0-1 | No |

=== Results by round ===
| Round | 1 | 2 | 3 | 4 | 5 | 6 | 7 | 8 | 9 | 10 | 11 | 12 | 13 | 14 | 15 | 16 | 17 | 18 | 19 | 20 | 21 | 22 | 23 | 24 | 25 | 26 | 27 | 28 | 29 | 30 | 31 | 32 | 33 | 34 | 35 | 36 | 37 | 38 | 39 | 40 | 41 | 42 | 43 | 44 | 45 | 46 |
|---|---|---|---|---|---|---|---|---|---|---|---|---|---|---|---|---|---|---|---|---|---|---|---|---|---|---|---|---|---|---|---|---|---|---|---|---|---|---|---|---|---|---|---|---|---|---|
| Ground | H | A | H | A | H | A | A | H | H | A | A | H | A | H | H | A | H | A | H | A | H | A | H | A | H | H | A | H | A | A | A | H | A | H | H | A | H | A | H | A | A | H | A | H | A | H |
| Result | W | D | D | W | L | W | L | L | L | D | L | L | L | L | D | L | W | L | W | W | W | W | L | L | W | W | D | L | L | D | W | W | W | W | D | D | L | L | D | L | L | L | D | W | D | W |
| Position | 2 | 4 | 9 | 6 | 8 | 6 | 8 | 10 | 17 | 14 | 17 | 20 | 20 | 23 | 23 | 23 | 20 | 22 | 20 | 17 | 16 | 14 | 15 | 16 | 16 | 14 | 14 | 17 | 17 | 17 | 14 | 15 | 12 | 11 | 14 | 14 | 15 | 15 | 15 | 15 | 16 | 16 | 16 | 16 | 16 | 16 |

Updated to match(es) played on 14 August 2015. Source:
A = Away; H = Home; W = Win; D = Draw; L = Loss

=== League One ===
==== League table ====
| Pos | Team | Pld | W | D | L | GF | GA | GD | Pts |
|---|---|---|---|---|---|---|---|---|---|
| 13 | Peterborough United | 46 | 19 | 6 | 21 | 82 | 73 | +9 | 63 |
| 14 | Southend United | 46 | 16 | 11 | 19 | 58 | 64 | −6 | 59 |
| 15 | Swindon Town | 46 | 16 | 11 | 19 | 64 | 71 | −7 | 59 |
| 16 | Bury | 46 | 16 | 12 | 18 | 56 | 73 | −17 | 57 (Note: Bury were deducted 3 points for playing the unregistered Callum Styles against Southend United on 8 May.) |
| 17 | Oldham Athletic | 46 | 12 | 18 | 16 | 44 | 58 | −14 | 54 |

Updated to match(es) played on 1 July 2016. Source: BBC Sport
Rules for classification: 1) Points; 2) Goal difference; 3) Number of goals scored

== Matches ==
Won Drawn Lost Postponed

=== Pre-season friendlies ===
On 29 May 2015, Swindon Town announced they would host FA Cup finalists Aston Villa on 21 July 2015. On 23 June 2015, Swindon added Swindon Supermarine to the pre-season schedule. A visit from Premier League side Everton on 11 July 2015, was confirmed on 29 June 2015. A friendly against Southern League Central side Petersfield Town was later announced for July 18. On 7 July 2015, Swindon Town added a home friendly against West Bromwich Albion. On 13 July 2015, Swindon Town announced a sixth and seventh friendly against Solihull Moors and Liverpool respectively. A behind-closed-doors friendly versus Queens Park Rangers was also arranged.

| 7 July 2015 Friendly | Swindon Supermarine | 2–1 | Swindon Town | South Marston |
| 19:30 BST | Hopper; Morris 82' | Report | Smith 60' | Stadium: Hunts Copse Ground |

| 11 July 2015 Friendly | Swindon Town | 0–4 | Everton | Swindon |
| 15:00 BST | | Report | Mirallas 49' 52'; Lukaku 90'; McAleny 90' | Stadium: County Ground |

| 14 July 2015 Friendly | Solihull Moors | 3–1 | Swindon Town | Solihull |
| 19:45 BST | Knights 20'; Asante 42'; Dean 45' | Report | Trialist | Stadium: The Autotech Stadium |

| 18 July 2015 Friendly | Petersfield Town | 2–3 | Swindon Town | Petersfield |
| 15:00 BST | Dixon | Report | Trialist; Trialist; Obika | Stadium: The Love Lane Stadium |

| 21 July 2015 Friendly | Swindon Town | 0–2 | Aston Villa | Swindon |
| 19:45 BST | | Report | Sinclair 29'; Sellars 82' | Stadium: County Ground |

| 22 July 2015 Friendly | Fairford Town | 1–3 | Swindon Town XI | Fairford |
| 19:45 BST | Hale 86' | Report | Cooke 53' 60'; Martinez 54' | Stadium: Cinder Lane |

| 25 July 2015 Friendly | Swindon Town | 1–4 | West Bromwich Albion | Swindon |
| 15:00 BST | Kasim 32' | Report | Morrison 9' (?); Anichebe 15'; Sessègnon | Stadium: County Ground |

| 29 July 2015 Friendly | Queens Park Rangers | 0–1 | Swindon Town | Shepherd's Bush |
| 15:00 BST | | Report | Kasim | Stadium: Loftus Road; Attendance: Behind closed doors |

| 2 August 2015 Friendly | Swindon Town | 1–2 | Liverpool | Swindon |
| 16:00 BST | Obika 63' | Report | Benteke 48'; Ojo 87' | Stadium: County Ground; Attendance: 14,591 |

| 3 August 2015 Friendly | Highmoor Ibis | 0–3 | Swindon Town XI | Reading |
| 19:45 BST | | Report | Storey; Cooke | Stadium: Scours Lane |

=== League One ===
On 17 June 2015, the fixtures for the forthcoming season were announced.

| 8 August 2015 1 | Swindon Town | 4–1 | Bradford City | Swindon |
| 15:00 BST | Byrne 52', 61', 68'; Obika 70' | Report | Morris 4' | Stadium: County Ground; Attendance: 8,090; Referee: Steve Martin |

| 15 August 2015 2 | Bury | 2–2 | Swindon Town | Bury |
| 15:00 BST | Pope 4'; Mayor 52' | Report | Robert 74'; Rodgers 83' | Stadium: Gigg Lane; Attendance: 3,947; Referee: Carl Boyeson |

| 18 August 2015 3 | Swindon Town | 2–2 | Port Vale | Swindon |
| 19:45 BST | Robert 12'; Rodgers 66' | Report | Ikpeazu 21'; Foley 90' (pen.) | Stadium: County Ground; Attendance: 7,026; Referee: Brendan Malone |

| 22 August 2015 4 | Southend United | 0–1 | Swindon Town | Southend-on-Sea |
| 15:00 BST | | Report | Robert 62' | Stadium: Roots Hall; Attendance: 5,839; Referee: Andy Woolmer |

| 29 August 2015 5 | Swindon Town | 0–2 | Sheffield United | Swindon |
| 15:00 BST | | Report | Collins 70'; Sharp 75' | Stadium: County Ground; Attendance: 8,614; Referee: Chris Sarginson |

| 5 September 2015 6 | Crewe Alexandra | 1–3 | Swindon Town | Crewe |
| 15:00 BST | King 61' | Report | Smith 63'; Thomas 82'; Ajose 90' | Stadium: Alexandra Stadium; Attendance: 4,400; Referee: Richard Clark |

| 12 September 2015 7 | Barnsley | 4–1 | Swindon Town | Barnsley |
| 15:00 BST | Watkins 22'; Wabara 44'; Nyatanga 59'; Hourihane 76' | Report | Nyatanga 20' (o.g.) | Stadium: Oakwell; Attendance: 8,227; Referee: Darren Bond |

| 19 September 2015 8 | Swindon Town | 0–1 | Burton Albion | Swindon |
| 15:00 BST | | Report | Beavon 27' | Stadium: County Ground; Attendance: 7,005; Referee: Scott Duncan |

| 26 September 2015 9 | Swindon Town | 1–2 | Colchester United | Swindon |
| 15:00 BST | Thomas 22' | Report | Moncur 3'; Harriott 42' | Stadium: County Ground; Attendance: 6,687; Referee: Oliver Langford |

| 26 September 2015 10 | Doncaster Rovers | 2–2 | Swindon Town | Doncaster |
| 19:45 BST | Anderson 73'; Williams 80' (pen.) | Report | Ajose 47'; Obika 90' | Stadium: Keepmoat Stadium; Attendance: 4,693; Referee: Ben Toner |

| 3 October 2015 11 | Blackpool | 1–0 | Swindon Town | Blackpool |
| 15:00 BST | Cullen 38' | Report | | Stadium: Bloomfield Road; Attendance: 6,704; Referee: David Webb |

| 10 October 2015 12 | Swindon Town | 1–2 | Peterborough United | Swindon |
| 15:00 BST | Bostwick 73' (o.g.) | Report | Taylor 38'; Angol 52' | Stadium: County Ground; Attendance: 7,025; Referee: Andy Madley |

| 17 October 2015 13 | Millwall | 2–0 | Swindon Town | South Bermondsey |
| 15:00 BST | Gregory 19'; O'Brien 26' | Report | | Stadium: The New Den; Attendance: 8,524; Referee: Darren Drysdale |

| 20 October 2015 14 | Swindon Town | 1–2 | Oldham Athletic | Swindon |
| 19:45 BST | Ajose 85' | Report | Jones 34'; Philliskirk 87' | Stadium: County Ground; Attendance: 6,430; Referee: Andy Davies |

| 20 October 2015 15 | Swindon Town | 2–2 | Coventry city | Swindon |
| 15:00 BST | Gladwin 85'; Ajose 90' (pen.) | Report | Vincelot 66'; Tudgay 81' | Stadium: County Ground; Attendance: 8,309; Referee: Dean Whitestone |

| 31 October 2015 16 | Wigan Athletic | 1–0 | Swindon Town | Wigan |
| 15:00 GMT | Júnior 90+5' | Report | | Stadium: DW Stadium; Attendance: 8,466; Referee: Nigel Miller |

| 14 November 2015 17 | Swindon Town | 2–1 | Scunthorpe United | Swindon |
| 15:00 GMT | Branco 55'; Ajose 59' | Report | Clarke 73' | Stadium: County Ground; Attendance: 6,957; Referee: Iain Williamson |

| 21 November 2015 18 | Fleetwood | 5–1 | Swindon Town | Fleetwood |
| 15:00 GMT | El-Abd 34' (o.g.); Sarcevic 55' (pen.); Henen 64'; Fosu 69'; Grant 84' | Report | Ajose 78' | Stadium: Highbury Stadium; Attendance: 2,880; Referee: Darren England |

| 24 November 2015 19 | Swindon Town | 2–1 | Walsall | Swindon |
| 19:45 GMT | Obika 17'; Thompson 90' | Report | Bradshaw 61' | Stadium: County Ground; Attendance: 6,957; Referee: Iain Williamson |

| 28 November 2015 20 | Chesterfield | 0–4 | Swindon Town | Chesterfield |
| 15:00 GMT | | Report | Ajose 3', 80'; Thompson 14'; Obika 48' | Stadium: Proact Stadium; Attendance: 6,178; Referee: Tim Robinson |

| 12 December 2015 21 | Swindon Town | 2–1 | Rochdale | Swindon |
| 15:00 GMT | Robert 33'; Gladwin 34' | Report | Lancashire 60' | Stadium: County Ground; Attendance: 7,149; Referee: David Webb |

| 19 December 2015 22 | Shrewsbury Town | 0–1 | Swindon Town | Shrewsbury |
| 15:00 GMT | | Report | Ajose 34' | Stadium: New Meadow; Attendance: 5,115; Referee: Jeremy Simpson |

| 26 December 2015 23 | Swindon Town | 1–3 | Gillingham | Swindon |
| 15:00 GMT | Obika 18' | Report | Dack 19'; Hessenthaler 35'; Jackson 69' | Stadium: County Ground; Attendance: 9,228; Referee: Fred Graham |

| 28 December 2015 24 | Burton Albion | 1–0 | Swindon Town | Burton upon Trent |
| 15:00 GMT | Akins 77' (pen.) | Report | | Stadium: Pirelli Stadium; Attendance: 4,816; Referee: Mark Brown |

| 9 January 2016 25 | Swindon Town | 4–2 | Southend United | Swindon |
| 15:00 GMT | Ajose 42' 90'; Obika 45' 78' | Report | Barnett 5'; Thompson 13' | Stadium: County Ground; Attendance: 7,162; Referee: Graham Salisbury |

| 16 January 2016 26 | Swindon Town | 4–3 | Crewe Alexandra | Swindon |
| 15:00 GMT | Ajose 14', 90'; Obika 47'; Nugent 52' (o.g.) | Report | Inman 20' 40'; Colclough 26' | Stadium: County Ground; Attendance: 6,888; Referee: Lee Collins |

| 23 January 2016 27 | Sheffield United | 1–1 | Swindon Town | Sheffield |
| 15:00 GMT | Sharp 8' (pen.) | Report | Ormonde-Ottewill 79' | Stadium: Bramall Lane; Attendance: 19,012; Referee: Trevor Kettle |

| 30 January 2016 28 | Swindon Town | 0–1 | Barnsley | Swindon |
| 15:00 GMT | | Report | Winnall 88' | Stadium: County Ground; Attendance: 7,532; Referee: Tim Robinson |

| 2 February 2016 29 | Port Vale | 1–0 | Swindon Town | Burslem |
| 19:45 GMT | Dickinson 6' | Report | | Stadium: Vale Park; Attendance: 3,256; Referee: Peter Bankes |

| 6 February 2016 30 | Gillingham | 0–0 | Swindon Town | Gillingham |
| 15:00 GMT | | Report | | Stadium: Priestfield; Attendance: 6,398; Referee: Andy Woolmer |

| 13 February 2016 31 | Colchester United | 1–4 | Swindon Town | Colchester |
| 15:00 GMT | Edwards 64' | Report | Ajose 36' 56'; Doughty 58' 72' | Stadium: Weston Homes Community Stadium; Attendance: 3,269; Referee: Steve Martin |

| 20 February 2016 32 | Swindon Town | 3–2 | Blackpool | Swindon |
| 15:00 GMT | Ajose 17' 61' 88' | Report | Aldred 2'; Philliskirk 65' (pen.) | Stadium: County Ground; Attendance: 7,412; Referee: Phil Gibbs |

| 27 February 2016 33 | Peterborough United | 1–2 | Swindon Town | Peterborough |
| 15:00 GMT | Maddison 12' (pen.) | Report | Ajose 49'; Doughty 82' | Stadium: London Road; Attendance: 5,124; Referee: Darren Handley |

| 1 March 2016 34 | Swindon Town | 2–0 | Doncaster Rovers | Swindon |
| 19:45 GMT | Obika 45' 66' | Report | | Stadium: County Ground; Attendance: 6,556; Referee: Nick Kinseley |

| 13 March 2016 35 | Swindon Town | 2–2 | Millwall | Swindon |
| 15:00 GMT | Ajose 63' (pen.); Doughty 90' | Report | Gregory 6'; Morison 11' | Stadium: County Ground; Attendance: 8,623; Referee: Kevin Wright |

| 19 March 2016 36 | Coventry City | 0–0 | Swindon Town | Coventry |
| 15:00 GMT | Vincelot (yellow card) 27' | Report | Rodgers (yellow card) 45'; Thompson (yellow card) 59' | Stadium: Ricoh Arena; Attendance: 12,322; Referee: Darren England |

| 25 March 2016 37 | Swindon Town | 1–4 | Wigan Athletic | Swindon |
| 17:30 GMT | Ajose 79' | Report | Grigg 15' 50'; Power 47'; Morsy 51' | Stadium: County Ground; Attendance: 9,240; Referee: Andy Davies |

| 28 March 2016 38 | Scunthorpe United | 6–0 | Swindon Town | Scunthorpe |
| 15:00 BST | Townsend 27'; Clarke 44'; Adelakun 48'; Hopper 52' 76'; Madden 62' | Report | | Stadium: Glanford Park; Attendance: 3,534; Referee: Eddie Ilderton |

| 2 April 2016 39 | Swindon Town | 1–1 | Fleetwood Town | Swindon |
| 15:00 GMT | Ajose 68' | Report | Burns 6' | Stadium: County Ground; Attendance: 6,311; Referee: Mark Brown |

| 5 April 2016 40 | Oldham Athletic | 2–0 | Swindon Town | Oldham |
| 19:45 BST | Kelly 10'; Main 82' | Report | | Stadium: Boundary Park; Attendance: 3,730; Referee: Andy Haines |

| 9 April 2016 41 | Bradford City | 1–0 | Swindon Town | Bradford |
| 15:00 BST | B. Clarke 20' | Report | | Stadium: Valley Parade; Attendance: 18,043; Referee: David Coote |

| 16 April 2016 42 | Swindon Town | 0–1 | Bury | Swindon |
| 15:00 BST | | Report | Mayor 63' | Stadium: County Ground; Attendance: 6,759; Referee: Darren Deadman |

| 19 April 2016 43 | Walsall | 1–1 | Swindon Town | Walsall |
| 19:45 BST | Morris 71' | Report | Doughty 59' | Stadium: Bescot Stadium; Attendance: 5,095; Referee: Nick Kinseley |

| 23 April 2016 44 | Swindon Town | 1–0 | Chesterfield | Swindon |
| 15:00 GMT | Kasim 77' | Report | | Stadium: County Ground; Attendance: 7,015; Referee: Trevor Kettle |

| 30 April 2016 45 | Rochdale | 2–2 | Swindon Town | Rochdale |
| 15:00 BST | Allen 45+2'; Lund 67' | Report | Obika 2'; N. Thompson 45+1' | Stadium: Spotland; Attendance: 2,806; Referee: Scott Duncan |

| 8 May 2016 46 | Swindon Town | 3–0 | Shrewsbury Town | Swindon |
| 12:30 BST | Ajose 45' (pen.) 48'; Young 86' | Repor | | Stadium: County Ground; Attendance: 8,012; Referee: Lee Collins |

=== F.A. Cup ===
| 7 November 2015 First round | Rochdale | 3–1 | Swindon Town | Rochdale |
| 15:00 BST | Mendez-Laing 24', 46', 69' (pen.) | Report | Ajose 71' | Stadium: Spotland Stadium; Attendance: 2,060; Referee: Chris Sarginson |

=== League Cup ===
On 16 June 2015, the first round draw was made, Swindon Town were drawn at home against Exeter City.

| 11 August 2015 First round | Swindon Town | 1–2 | Exeter City | Swindon |
| 19:45 BST | Obika 65' | Report | Nicholls 37'; Wheeler 41' | Stadium: County Ground |

=== Football League Trophy ===
On 8 August 2015, live on Soccer AM the draw for the first round of the Football League Trophy was drawn by Toni Duggan and Alex Scott. Robins were to travel to Newport County. On 5 September 2015, the second round draw was shown live on Soccer AM and drawn by Charlie Austin and Ed Skrein. Swindon were drawn away to Oxford United.

| 1 September 2015 1st round | Newport County | 1–1 (6–7 p) | Swindon Town | Newport |
| | Collins 72' | Report | Rodgers 19' | Stadium: Rodney Parade; Attendance: 1,434; Referee: Kevin Johnson |
| | Penalties |
| | Byrne (penalty scored); Ansah (penalty scored); Klukowski (penalty scored); Boden (penalty scored); Ofori-Twumasi (penalty scored); Owen-Evans (penalty scored); Collins (penalty missed) | | Rodgers (penalty scored); Robert (penalty scored); Turnbull (penalty scored); Brophy (penalty scored); Branco (penalty scored); Barry (penalty scored); Randall (penalty scored) |

| 6 October 2015 2nd round | Oxford United | 2–0 | Swindon Town | Oxford |
| 19:45 BST (UTC+1) | Roofe 41' 53' | Report | | Stadium: Kassam Stadium; Attendance: 9,013; Referee: Gavin Ward |
