= Balmy =

Balmy may refer to:

- Coralie Balmy (born 1987), French freestyle swimmer
- Jérémy Balmy (born 1994), French footballer
- Balmy Alley, San Francisco, California, United States
