= Josh Cooke (footballer) =

English footballer

Personal information
- Full name: Joshua Ian Ron Cooke
- Date of birth: 4 February 1997 (age 29)
- Place of birth: England
- Position: Forward

Youth career
- 2011–2013: Wolverhampton Wanderers
- 2013–2015: Swindon Town

Senior career*
Years	Team	Apps	(Gls)
2015–2016	Swindon Town	4	(0)
2015	→ Staines Town (loan)	8	(1)
2015	→ Cheltenham Town (loan)	6	(0)
2015–2016	→ Gloucester City (loan)	5	(3)
2016	AFC Telford United	1	(0)
2016	Alvechurch		
2016–2017	Sutton Coldfield Town		
2017–2018	Stourbridge		
2018	Stratford Town		
2018–2019	Wolverhampton Sporting		
2019	Stourport Swifts		
2019	Romulus		
2019–2020	Boldmere St. Michaels		
2020	Chasetown		
- * Club domestic league appearances and goals as of 18:55, 24 June 2024 (UTC)

Joshua Ian Ron Cooke (born 4 February 1997) is an English footballer who plays as a forward.

== Playing career ==
Josh Cooke became a scholar at Swindon Town in the summer of 2013. On 25 April 2015, the centre-forward made his professional football debut as a second-half substitute in the League One game against Preston North End.

In March 2015, Cooke joined Conference South side Staines Town on a one-month loan deal. On 10 March 2015, Cooke made his Staines Town debut in their 2–1 away defeat against Bishop's Stortford, replacing Elliott Buchanan in the 73rd minute. A month later, Cooke scored his first and only goal for Staines in their 2–1 victory over Weston-super-Mare. On 10 August 2015, Cooke joined recently relegated National League side Cheltenham Town on a one-month loan. Throughout Cooke's loan spell at the club, he failed to register a single start, making six substitute appearances before returning to Swindon at the end of the month. Following a frustrating loan spell at Cheltenham, Cooke joined National League North side Gloucester City on a one-month loan deal in October 2015. On 3 October 2015, Cooke made his Gloucester City debut in their 1–0 home defeat against Harrogate Town, featuring for 72 minutes before being replaced by Joe Parker. A few weeks later, Cooke scored his first league goal for the club in their 1–0 victory over Corby Town, netting the winner in the 66th minute.

On 11 May 2016, it was announced that Cooke would leave Swindon upon the expiry of his current deal.

Following his release from Swindon, Cooke joined National League North side AFC Telford United in August 2016. On 13 September 2016, Cooke made his first and only appearance for Telford in their 3–0 away defeat against his former club; Gloucester City.

Preceding short spells at Continental Star, Alvechurch and Sutton Coldfield Town, Cooke joined Northern Premier League Premier Division side Stourbridge in March 2017.

On 7 August 2018, it was confirmed that Cooke had joined Stratford Town from Stourbridge.

== Career statistics ==
As of match played 18 March 2017.

Appearances and goals by club, season and competition
Club	Season	League			FA Cup		League Cup		Other		Total	
Club	Season	Division	Apps	Goals	Apps	Goals	Apps	Goals	Apps	Goals	Apps	Goals
Swindon Town	2014–15	League One	2	0	0	0	0	0	0	0	2	0
Swindon Town	2015–16	League One	2	0	0	0	0	0	0	0	2	0
Swindon Town	Total		4	0	0	0	0	0	0	0	4	0
Staines Town (loan)	2014–15	Conference South	8	1	0	0	—		0	0	8	1
Cheltenham Town (loan)	2015–16	National League	6	0	0	0	—		0	0	6	0
Gloucester City (loan)	2015–16	National League North	5	3	2	1	—		0	0	7	3
AFC Telford United	2016–17	National League North	1	0	0	0	—		0	0	1	0
Alvechurch	2016–17	Northern Premier League Division One South	2	1	0	0	—		0	0	2	0
Career total			26	3	2	1	0	0	0	0	28	4
