= Drissa Traoré =

Ivorian footballer

Personal information
- Date of birth: 25 March 1992 (age 34)
- Place of birth: Bouaké, Ivory Coast
- Height: 1.73 m (5 ft 8 in)
- Position: Midfielder

Team information
- Current team: Chantilly

Senior career*
Years	Team	Apps	(Gls)
2010–2014	Le Havre B	85	(7)
2012–2014	Le Havre	5	(0)
2014–2015	Notts County	4	(0)
2015–2016	Swindon Town	24	(0)
2016–2018	Forest Green Rovers	50	(0)
2018	Tranmere Rovers	3	(0)
2019–2021	Beauvais	19	(0)
2021–	Chantilly	4	(0)

International career
- Ivory Coast U20
- * Club domestic league appearances and goals as of 25 September 2021

Drissa Traoré (born 25 March 1992) is an Ivorian professional footballer who plays as a midfielder for Championnat National 1 club Chantilly.

== Club career ==
After playing in France for Le Havre, Traoré signed for English club Notts County on 1 September 2014. He was released by the club at the end of the 2014–15 season.

Traoré signed a one-year contract on 13 July 2015 with Swindon Town. In April 2016, he was suspended by the club alongside teammates Jeremy Balmy and Brandon Ormonde-Ottewill. Swindon Town launched a full investigation into the trio, after they were seen on social media inhaling nitrous oxide gas.

In June 2016, Traoré joined Forest Green Rovers on a two-year contract, linking up with his former Swindon Town manager Mark Cooper at The New Lawn. He helped Forest Green gain promotion to the Football League for the first time in their history on 14 May 2017 in the National League play-off final at Wembley Stadium, starting in a 3–1 win over Tranmere Rovers.

Traoré left Forest Green Rovers in February 2018, joining Tranmere Rovers in March 2018. He missed a visit to see family in France in order to complete the signing. He was released by Tranmere at the end of the 2017–18 season.

== International career ==
Traoré has represented the Ivory Coast at under-20 youth level.

== Career statistics ==
As of 11 April 2018

Appearances and goals by club, season and competition
Club	Season	League			National cup		League cup		Other		Total	
Club	Season	Division	Apps	Goals	Apps	Goals	Apps	Goals	Apps	Goals	Apps	Goals
Le Havre II	2010–11	CFA	23	1	0	0	0	0	0	0	23	1
Le Havre II	2011–12	CFA	24	4	0	0	0	0	0	0	24	4
Le Havre II	2012–13	CFA	21	2	0	0	0	0	0	0	21	2
Le Havre II	2013–14	CFA2	17	0	0	0	0	0	0	0	17	0
Le Havre II	Total		85	7	0	0	0	0	0	0	85	7
Le Havre	2012–13	Ligue 2	5	0	2	0	0	0	0	0	7	0
Le Havre	2013–14	Ligue 2	0	0	0	0	0	0	0	0	0	0
Le Havre	Total		5	0	2	0	0	0	0	0	7	0
Notts County	2014–15	League One	4	0	1	0	0	0	2 (Note: Appearances in the Football League Trophy)	0	7	0
Swindon Town	2015–16	League One	24	0	0	0	0	0	2	0	26	0
Forest Green Rovers	2016–17	National League	30	0	1	0	0	0	4 (Note: One appearance in the FA Trophy and three in the National League play-offs)	0	35	0
Forest Green Rovers	2017–18	League Two	20	0	1	0	1	0	4	0	26	0
Forest Green Rovers	Total		50	0	2	0	1	0	8	0	61	0
Tranmere Rovers	2017–18	National League	3	0	0	0	0	0	0	0	3	0
Career total			171	7	5	0	1	0	12	0	189	7
