= Moussa Diarra (footballer, born 1990) =

French footballer

Personal information
- Date of birth: 4 February 1990 (age 36)
- Place of birth: Élancourt, France
- Height: 1.95 m (6 ft 5 in)
- Position: Centre-back

Youth career
- OSC Élancourt

Senior career*
Years	Team	Apps	(Gls)
2011–2012	Horley Town		
2012–2013	St Albans City	17	(4)
2013–2015	Hemel Hempstead Town	63	(3)
2014	→ Hampton & Richmond Borough (loan)	7	(0)
2015	→ Hampton & Richmond Borough (loan)	8	(5)
2015–2016	Hampton & Richmond Borough	45	(12)
2016–2018	Barrow	84	(8)
2018–2019	Dover Athletic	16	(0)
2019	→ Woking (loan)	11	(1)
2019–2020	Woking	32	(2)
2020–2021	Havant & Waterlooville	12	(1)
2021–2022	Woking	60	(6)
2022–2024	Barnet	20	(1)
2023–2024	→ Dartford (loan)	20	(1)
2024	→ Eastbourne Borough (loan)	15	(4)
2024–2025	Eastbourne Borough	34	(0)
2025–2026	Wealdstone	6	(0)
2026	→ Carshalton Athletic (loan)	3	(0)
- * Club domestic league appearances and goals as of 13:49, 10 August 2026 (UTC)

Moussa Diarra (born 4 February 1990) is a French professional footballer who plays as a centre-back.

== Career ==
Diarra was born in Élancourt and played for clubs in his home town, and in Montigny-le-Bretonneux, before moving to England in 2011. He had a trial with Tooting & Mitcham United before joining Horley Town in October 2011. In February 2012, he joined Southern League side St Albans City, before moving to divisional rivals Hemel Hempstead Town in January 2013. He was part of the Hemel side that won promotion to the Conference South in 2013–14.

Diarra had two loan spells with Hampton & Richmond Borough in the 2014–15 season, before signing for the Beavers permanently in July 2015. He scored 12 goals in 45 league games as Hampton & Richmond won the 2015–16 Isthmian League title.

He turned professional in summer 2016, joining National League side Barrow. He spent two seasons at the Bluebirds, before joining Dover Athletic ahead of the 2018–19 season as he wanted to live closer to France.

Diarra struggled to break into the Dover team as he recovered from a pulled hamstring and joined Woking on loan until the end of the 2018–19 season, helping the side to win promotion through the playoffs before joining the club permanently ahead of the 2019–20 season. In August 2020, Diarra turned down a new contract offer from the Cards and joined Havant & Waterlooville. However, in January 2021 he re-joined Woking on a permanent basis after the National League South season was curtailed due to the ongoing coronavirus pandemic.

Diarra signed for Barnet ahead of the 2022–23 season. On 26 August 2023, Diarra joined Dartford on loan until January 2024. Then, he joined Eastbourne Borough on loan until April 2024, before signing for the club permanently after being released by Barnet at the end of the 2023–24 season.

On 11th August 2025, Diarra signed for National League side Wealdstone. In April 2026, he joined Isthmian League Premier Division side Carshalton Athletic on dual registration.

== Career statistics ==
As of match played 25 April 2026

Appearances and goals by club, season and competition
Club	Season	League			National Cup		League Cup		Other		Total	
Club	Season	Division	Apps	Goals	Apps	Goals	Apps	Goals	Apps	Goals	Apps	Goals
Horley Town	2011–12	CCL Premier Division	No data currently available									
St Albans City	2011–12	Southern League Premier Division	4	1	0	0	0	0	1 (Note: Appearance(s) in the Herts Charity Cup.)	0	5	1
St Albans City	2012–13	Southern League Premier Division	13	3	3	0	0	0	2 (Note: One appearance and one goal in the Southern League Cup, one appearance in the Herts Senior Cup.)	1	18	4
St Albans City	Total		17	4	3	0	0	0	3	1	23	5
Hemel Hempstead Town	2012–13	Southern League Premier Division	11	1	0	0	0	0	2 (Note: Appearance(s) in the Southern League Premier Division play-offs.)	0	13	1
Hemel Hempstead Town	2013–14	Southern League Premier Division	35	2	6	0	0	0	5 (Note: Three appearances in the FA Trophy, one appearance and one goal in the Southern League Cup, one appearance in the Herts Senior Cup.)	1	46	3
Hemel Hempstead Town	2014–15	Conference South	17	0	3	0	0	0	3 (Note: Appearance(s) in the FA Trophy.)	0	23	0
Hemel Hempstead Town	Total		63	3	9	0	0	0	10	1	82	4
Hampton & Richmond Borough (loan)	2014–15	Isthmian League Premier Division	7	0	0	0	0	0	1 (Note: Appearance(s) in the Alan Turvey Trophy.)	1	8	1
Hampton & Richmond Borough (loan)	2014–15	Isthmian League Premier Division	8	5	0	0	0	0	0	0	8	5
Hampton & Richmond Borough	2015–16	Isthmian League Premier Division	45	12	1	0	0	0	4	0	50	12
Hampton & Richmond Borough	Total		60	17	1	0	0	0	5	1	66	18
Barrow	2016–17	National League	46	5	4	0	0	0	5	0	55	5
Barrow	2017–18	National League	38	3	0	0	0	0	3	0	41	3
Barrow	Total		84	8	4	0	0	0	8	0	96	8
Dover Athletic	2018–19	National League	16	0	1	0	0	0	3	0	20	0
Woking (loan)	2018–19	National League South	11	1	0	0	0	0	2 (Note: Appearance(s) in National League South play-offs)	1	13	2
Woking	2019–20	National League	32	2	0	0	0	0	0	0	32	2
Woking	Total		43	3	0	0	0	0	2	1	45	4
Havant & Waterlooville	2020–21	National League South	12	1	3	0	0	0	0	0	15	1
Woking	2020–21	National League	21	4	0	0	0	0	3	0	24	4
Woking	2021–22	National League	39	2	1	0	0	0	1	0	41	2
Woking	Total		60	6	1	0	0	0	4	0	65	6
Barnet	2022–23	National League	20	1	2	0	0	0	2 (Note: One appearance in FA Trophy, one appearance in Middlesex Senior Cup)	0	24	1
Barnet	2023–24	National League	0	0	0	0	0	0	0	0	0	0
Barnet	Total		20	1	2	0	0	0	2	0	24	1
Dartford (loan)	2023–24	National League South	20	1	1	0	0	0	2 (Note: One appearance in FA Trophy, one appearance in London Senior Cup)	0	23	1
Eastbourne Borough (loan)	2023–24	National League South	15	4	0	0	0	0	0	0	15	4
Eastbourne Borough	2024–25	National League South	34	0	1	0	0	0	5 (Note: Two appearances and one goal in FA Trophy, three appearances in Sussex Senior Cup)	1	40	1
Eastbourne Borough	Total		49	4	1	0	0	0	5	1	55	5
Wealdstone	2025–26	National League	6	0	0	0	0	0	5 (Note: Includes FA Trophy and National League Cup)	0	11	0
Carshalton Athletic (loan)	2025–26	Isthmian League Premier Division	3	0	0	0	0	0	0	0	3	0
Career total			453	47	26	0	0	0	49	5	528	52
