= Brandon Ormonde-Ottewill =

English footballer (born 1995)

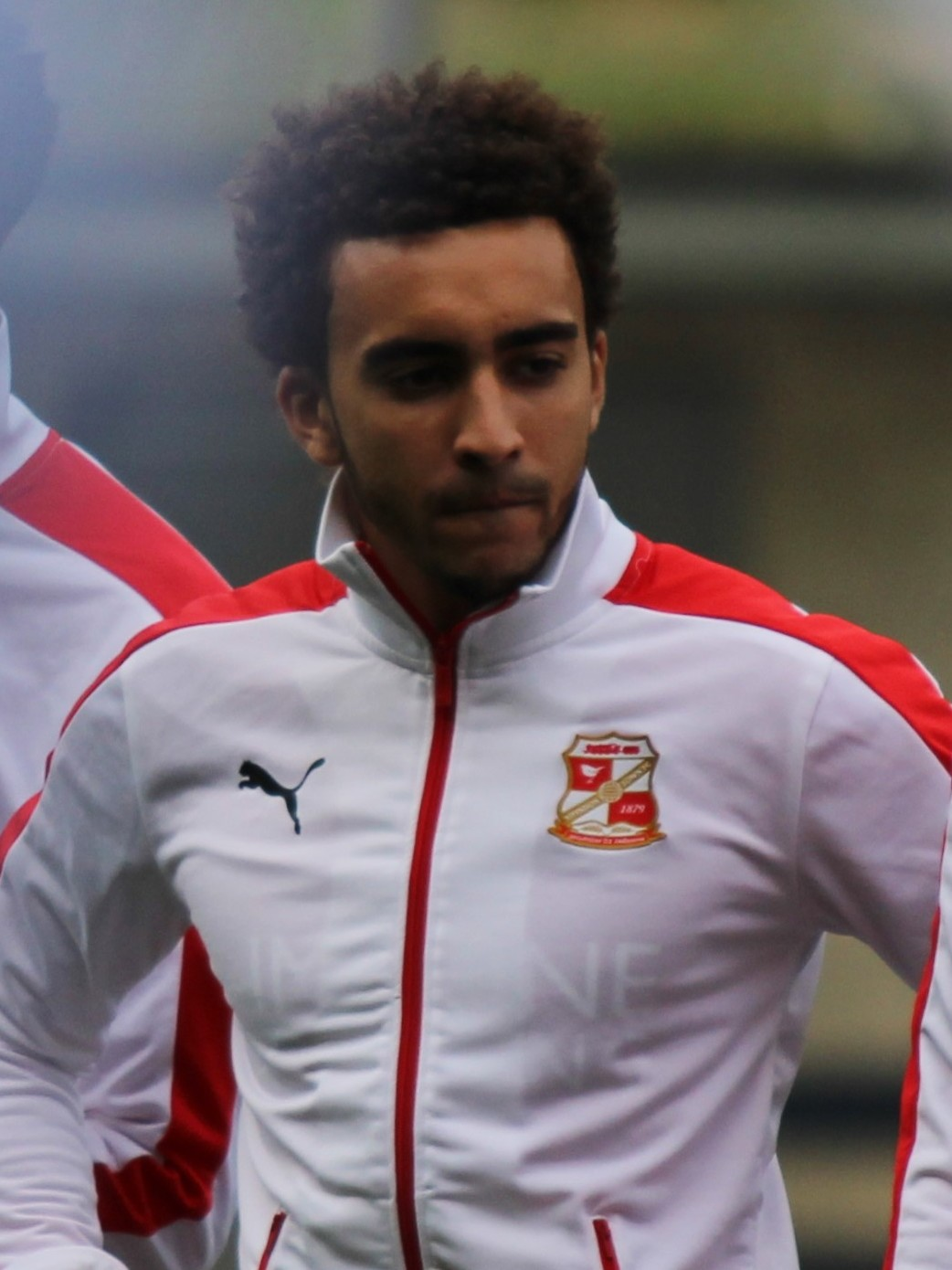
- Ormonde-Ottewill with Swindon Town in 2015

Personal information
- Full name: Brandon Rutherford Ormonde-Ottewill
- Date of birth: 21 December 1995 (age 30)
- Place of birth: Sutton, England
- Height: 1.74 m (5 ft 9 in)
- Position: Left-back

Team information
- Current team: Puskás Akadémia
- Number: 33

Youth career
- 2004–2015: Arsenal

Senior career*
Years	Team	Apps	(Gls)
2015–2017	Swindon Town	49	(2)
2017–2018	Helmond Sport	1	(0)
2018–2020	FC Dordrecht	54	(0)
2020	→ Excelsior (loan)	5	(0)
2020–2022	Excelsior	53	(0)
2022–	Puskás Akadémia	65	(1)

International career^{‡}
2011	England U16	1	(0)
2014	England U19	1	(0)
- * Club domestic league appearances and goals as of 19 January 2026 ‡ National team caps and goals as of 18:00, 20 February 2016 (UTC)

Brandon Rutherford Ormonde-Ottewill (born 21 December 1995) is an English professional footballer who plays as a left-back for Hungarian Nemzeti Bajnokság I club Puskás Akadémia.

== Club career ==
=== Arsenal ===
Ormonde-Ottewill started his football career within the Arsenal Academy at the age of 8. He continued through their ranks before signing a professional contract in 2012. He was released at the end of the 2014–15 season along with Abou Diaby, Ryo Miyaichi, Jack Jebb, Semi Ajayi, Josh Vickers and Austin Lipman.

=== Swindon Town ===
In July 2015, Ormonde-Ottewill joined Swindon Town on a free transfer upon his release from Arsenal. He made his first appearance for the club in a pre-season fixture against Everton which ended in a 4–0 defeat. His competitive debut came on the opening day of the 2015–16 Football League season when he played the full match in a 4–1 victory over Bradford City. In April 2016, Ormonde-Ottewill was suspended by the club alongside teammates Drissa Troare and Jeremy Balmy. The club statement came hours after it was reported the trio were seen inhaling nitrous oxide gas on social media.

On 2 May 2017, it was announced that Ormonde-Ottewill would leave Swindon upon the expiry of his contract in June 2017.

=== Netherlands ===
On 28 July 2017, following his release from Swindon, Ormonde-Ottewill joined Dutch side Helmond Sport on a one-year deal. After making just one appearance all season due to injury, Ormonde-Ottewill joined fellow Dutch side FC Dordrecht on a two-year deal with the option of an additional year. After being loaned to SBV Excelsior in January 2020, he signed a two-year permanent deal with the club in the summer of that year.

=== Hungary ===
In September 2022, Ormonde-Ottewill joined Nemzeti Bajnokság I side Puskás Akadémia on a free transfer, signing a one-year deal.

== International career ==
Brandon Ormode-Ottewill has represented England at both under 16 and under 19 level.

== Career statistics ==
As of matches played 9 October 2022

Appearances and goals by club, season and competition
Club	Season	League			National cup		League cup		Other		Total	
Club	Season	Division	Apps	Goals	Apps	Goals	Apps	Goals	Apps	Goals	Apps	Goals
Swindon Town	2015–16	League One	28	1	0	0	1	0	1 (Note: Appearances in EFL Trophy)	0	30	1
Swindon Town	2016–17	League One	21	1	2	0	0	0	3	0	26	1
Swindon Town	Total		49	2	2	0	1	0	4	0	56	2
Helmond Sport	2017–18	Eerste Divisie	1	0	0	0	—		—		1	0
FC Dordrecht	2018–19	Eerste Divisie	33	0	1	0	—		—		34	0
FC Dordrecht	2019–20	Eerste Divisie	21	0	2	0	—		—		23	0
FC Dordrecht	Total		54	0	3	0	—		—		57	0
Excelsior (loan)	2019–20	Eerste Divisie	5	0	—		—		—		5	0
Excelsior	2020–21	Eerste Divisie	25	0	3	0	—		—		28	0
Excelsior	2021–22	Eerste Divisie	28	0	2	0	—		—		30	0
Excelsior	Total		53	0	5	0	—		—		47	0
Puskás Akadémia	2022–23	Nemzeti Bajnokság I	8	0	2	0	—		—		10	0
Career total			170	2	11	0	1	0	4	0	187	2
