= Fabien Robert =

French footballer (born 1989)

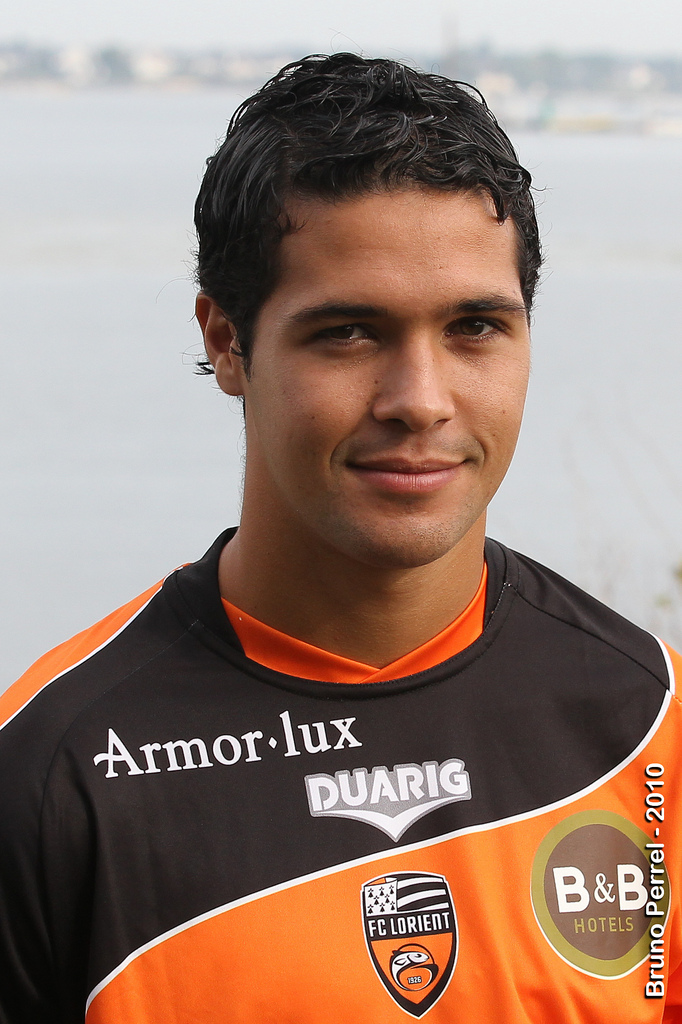

Personal information
- Date of birth: 6 January 1989 (age 37)
- Place of birth: Hennebont, France
- Height: 5 ft 9 in (1.75 m)
- Position: Attacking midfielder

Youth career
- 1998–2000: Lanester
- 2000–2007: Lorient

Senior career*
Years	Team	Apps	(Gls)
2007–2015	Lorient	72	(2)
2009–2010	→ Boulogne (loan)	16	(1)
2010–2014	Lorient B	42	(14)
2012	→ Doncaster Rovers (loan)	13	(2)
2015–2016	Swindon Town	35	(4)
2016–2019	Forest Green Rovers	23	(3)
2017	→ Aldershot Town (loan)	14	(2)
2018	→ Aldershot Town (loan)	9	(0)
2018	→ Gloucester City (loan)	5	(2)
2019	→ Gloucester City (loan)	11	(4)
2019–2022	Gloucester City	52	(11)

International career
2009–2010	France U20	6	(4)
- * Club domestic league appearances and goals as of 7 August 2020

Fabien Robert (born 6 January 1989) is a French footballer who played for English club Gloucester City as an attacking midfielder. He is without a club (as of 12 April 2024).

== Club career ==
=== Lorient ===
Robert is a product of the FC Lorient Centre de Formation, having previously played for local side AS Lanester. Following great success playing on Lorient's under-18 and CFA 2 squad, on 15 June 2007, he signed an unprecedented five-year professional contract effectively keeping him with Lorient until 2012. He was promoted to the senior squad for the Ligue 1 2007–08 season and assigned the number 28 shirt. He made his professional debut on 1 September 2007 in a league match against Strasbourg appearing as a substitute in the 60th minute. The final result was a 0–0 draw. Over the course of the season, he made eleven appearances, nine of them as a substitute and one start, his first ever, in a 0–0 draw against Le Mans.

==== Doncaster Rovers (loan) ====
On 31 January 2012, Robert joined Championship side Doncaster Rovers on loan until the end of the season. After making four appearances as a substitute, he finally started the match against Birmingham City which ended in a 3–1 defeat on 30 March 2012. He scored his first goal for Doncaster in the 4–3 defeat to Portsmouth on 14 April 2012.

=== Swindon Town ===
On 30 July 2015 Robert joined Swindon on a one-year contract (plus one optional). He scored his first goal for the club in a 2–2 draw away at Bury.

=== Forest Green Rovers ===
On 4 August 2016, it was announced that Robert had signed for National League side Forest Green Rovers. He was part of the squad winning the promotion to League Two in the Play off at Wembley.

He made a bright start, with his loan deal being extended, but picked up an injury, causing Robert's loan to be terminated and he returned to Forest Green. However, on 15 January 2018, Robert re-joined Aldershot Town on a loan deal until the end of the season. On 20 September, Robert joined National League South side Gloucester City on a one-month loan deal. The deal was then extended by another month.

== International career ==
Robert is available for selection with the France under-21 team and appeared in a FIFA non-sanctioned friendly with the under-21s against the Paris Saint-Germain Reserves played in January 2009. On 25 May 2009, he was selected to the under-20 squad to participate in the 2009 Mediterranean Games.

== Personal life ==
He is the brother of Laurent Robert.

== Career statistics ==
As of match played 2 May 2018

Appearances and goals by club, season and competition
Club	Season	League			National Cup		League Cup		Other		Total	
Club	Season	Division	Apps	Goals	Apps	Goals	Apps	Goals	Apps	Goals	Apps	Goals
Lorient	2007–08	Ligue 1	11	0	0	0	0	0	0	0	11	0
Lorient	2008–09	Ligue 1	6	0	0	0	0	0	0	0	6	0
Lorient	2009–10	Ligue 1	0	0	0	0	0	0	0	0	0	0
Lorient	2010–11	Ligue 1	4	1	3	0	2	0	0	0	9	1
Lorient	2011–12	Ligue 1	1	0	0	0	1	0	0	0	2	0
Lorient	2012–13	Ligue 1	4	1	2	0	0	0	0	0	6	1
Lorient	2013–14	Ligue 1	12	0	0	0	1	0	0	0	13	0
Lorient	2014–15	Ligue 1	3	0	0	0	1	0	0	0	4	0
Lorient	FC Lorient total		41	2	5	0	5	0	0	0	51	2
Lorient II	2010–11	CFA	11	4	—		—		—		11	4
Lorient II	2011–12	CFA	6	2	—		—		—		6	2
Lorient II	2012–13	CFA	13	4	—		—		—		13	4
Lorient II	2013–14	CFA 2	7	4	—		—		—		7	4
Lorient II	2014–15	CFA	5	0	—		—		—		5	0
Lorient II	FC Lorient II total		42	14	—		—		—		42	14
Boulogne (loan)	2009–10	Ligue 1	16	1	0	0	1	0	0	0	17	1
Doncaster Rovers (loan)	2011–12	Championship	13	2	0	0	0	0	—		13	2
Swindon Town	2015–16	League One	35	4	1	0	1	0	1 (Note: Appearance in the Football League Trophy)	0	38	4
Forest Green Rovers	2016–17	National League	23	3	1	0	—		3 (Note: Appearances in the FA Trophy)	0	27	3
Aldershot Town (loan)	2017–18	National League	23	2	1	0	—		1 (Note: Appearances in the National League play-offs)	0	25	2
Career total			193	28	8	0	7	0	5	0	212	28
