= Hakan Hayrettin =

English football player and manager (born 1970)

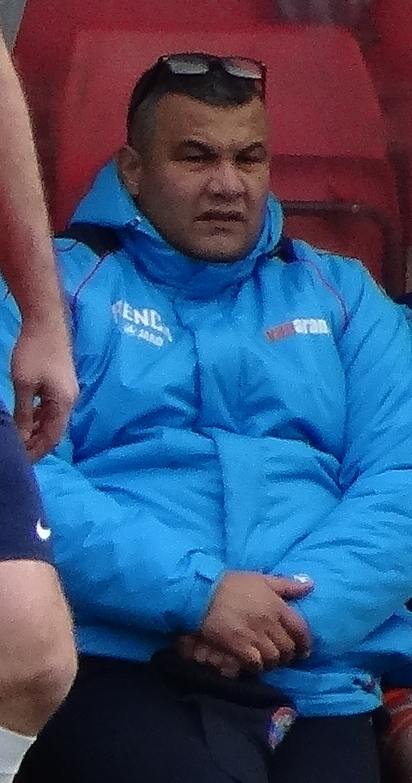
- Hayrettin with Braintree Town in 2017

Personal information
- Full name: Hakan Hayrettin
- Date of birth: 4 February 1970 (age 56)
- Place of birth: Enfield, England
- Position: Midfielder

Youth career
- –1988: Leyton Orient

Senior career*
| Years | Team | Apps | (Gls) |
| 1988–1989 | Leyton Orient | 0 | (0) |
| 1989–1993 | Barnet | 83 | |
| 1993 | → Torquay United (loan) | 4 | (0) |
| 1993 | → Wycombe Wanderers (loan) | 10 | |
| 1993–1994 | Wycombe Wanderers | 27 | (1) |
| 1994–1995 | Cambridge United | 17 | (0) |
| 1995–1996 | Doncaster Rovers | 0 | (0) |
| 1996–1999 | Peterborough United | 0 | (0) |
- Heybridge Swifts
- Hayes
- Rushden & Diamonds
| 199?–1999 | Harrow Borough | | |
| 1999–2000 | Boreham Wood | | |
| 2000–2001 | Harrow Borough | | |

Managerial career
- 2003–2006: Waltham Forest
- 2006–2010: Thurrock
- 2011–2013: Grays Athletic
- 2016–2017: Braintree Town
- 2018–2019: Braintree Town
- 2020–2023: Maidstone United
- 2023–2025: Dulwich Hamlet
- * Club domestic league appearances and goals

Hakan Hayrettin (born 4 February 1970) is an English football coach and former player who was most recently the manager of Dulwich Hamlet.

== Early life ==
Hayrettin was born in Enfield, London to Turkish Cypriot parents.

== Playing career ==
Hayrettin began his career as an apprentice with Leyton Orient, turning professional in July 1988. He was released without breaking into the first team, joining Barnet in August 1989. In 1990, he signed for Turkish side Karsiyaka, but his Turkish parentage would have made him eligible for national service, and the prospect of war with the situation deteriorating in the Gulf, so he resigned at Barnet who later won the Conference and with it promotion to the Football League.

He joined Torquay United on loan in January 1993, also playing on loan for Wycombe Wanderers that season as they too won the Conference. He also played in their FA Trophy winning side. He joined Wycombe on a free transfer in July 1993, playing 27 games, and scoring once, a memorable goal against Preston North End, helping Wycombe to a second successive promotion, via the play-offs. In August 1994 he moved to Cambridge United on a free transfer where He suffered a serious knee injury limiting his appearances for the club. He then moved on to Doncaster Rovers on a free transfer in July 1995.

He never made the first team with Doncaster and was released in October 1996 due to the same serious knee injury he suffered at Cambridge at the start of the season. He joined Peterborough United, but the same serious injury forced him to retire from full-time football in 1997. He joined Watford as a youth coach, but continued his player career in non-league football with Heybridge Swifts before moving on to Hayes, Rushden & Diamonds and Harrow Borough. He played for Barnet as a trialist on 31 August 1999, making a substitute appearance against Boreham Wood, who he would spend the 1999–2000 season with. He left Boreham Wood in July 2000 to rejoin Harrow Borough, both as a player and a coaching assistant, whilst working as a stock processing manager. He had left Harrow by September 2001.

== Managerial career ==
Hayrettin joined Waltham Forest as manager in the 2003 close season, helping the club to win the Essex Senior Cup. In May 2006 he took over as manager of Conference South side Thurrock. On taking over at Thurrock, Hayrettin was quoted as saying that "the challenge of raising a "sleeping giant" was too much to resist". At the start of the 2010–11 season Hayrettin left the club in October 2010.

On 26 May 2011, he was appointed manager of Isthmian League Division One North side Grays Athletic, signing a two-year contract. He led the club to the play-offs in his first season in charge, but lost in the semi-final. In the 2012–13 season Hayrettin led Grays to promotion into the Isthmian League Premier Division with a club-record 102 points, only losing four league games throughout the campaign.

It was announced on 5 July 2013 that Hayrettin had left Grays to join John Still's coaching team at Conference Premier side Luton Town as first team coach . He left the club on 7 January 2016 following the appointment of Nathan Jones as manager. During his time there he helped the club win the Conference title in the first season and finishing 8th in the first season back in the Football League the following season. Hayrettin also coached the U23 side winning the Football League Final Third U23 title in their first season back in the Football League.

On 27 September 2016, Hayrettin was appointed as first-team manager of National League club Braintree Town. After Braintree's relegation at the end of 2016–17, he left the club by mutual consent on 8 May 2017.

On 9 October 2018, following the departure of Brad Quinton, Hayrettin was reinstated manager of Braintree Town on an interim basis. He left Braintree to become Head Coach of Maidstone United in January 2019. On 30 April 2022, and with two games remaining, Hayrettin's side were confirmed as National League South 2021–22 champions and achieved promotion back to the National League after a three-year absence for the Kent side. On 9 January 2023, Hayrettin was sacked with Maidstone sitting in 23rd position.

On 2 March 2023, Dulwich Hamlet Football Club announced they had appointed Hayrettin as first team manager. On 7 January 2025, Hayrettin was sacked with the club sitting in fifteenth position in the Isthmian League Premier.

== Managerial statistics ==
As of 9 January 2023

Managerial record by team and tenure
| Team | From | To | Record | | | | | Ref |
| Team | From | To | P | W | D | L | Win % | Ref |
|---|---|---|---|---|---|---|---|---|
| Braintree Town | 27 September 2016 | 8 May 2017 | 41 | 15 | 7 | 19 | 36.6 | |
| Braintree Town (caretaker) | 9 October 2018 | 23 January 2019 | 16 | 4 | 4 | 8 | 25.0 | |
| Maidstone United | 24 January 2019 | 9 January 2023 | 146 | 59 | 33 | 54 | 40.4 | |
| Total | | | 203 | 78 | 44 | 81 | 38.4 | — |

== Honours ==
=== Player ===
Wycombe Wanderers

- FA Trophy: 1992–93

=== Manager ===
Maidstone United

- National League South: 2021–22

Individual

- National League South Manager of the Month: December 2021, April 2022
- National League South Manager of the Year: 2021-22
