= Momar Bangoura =

French footballer (born 1994)

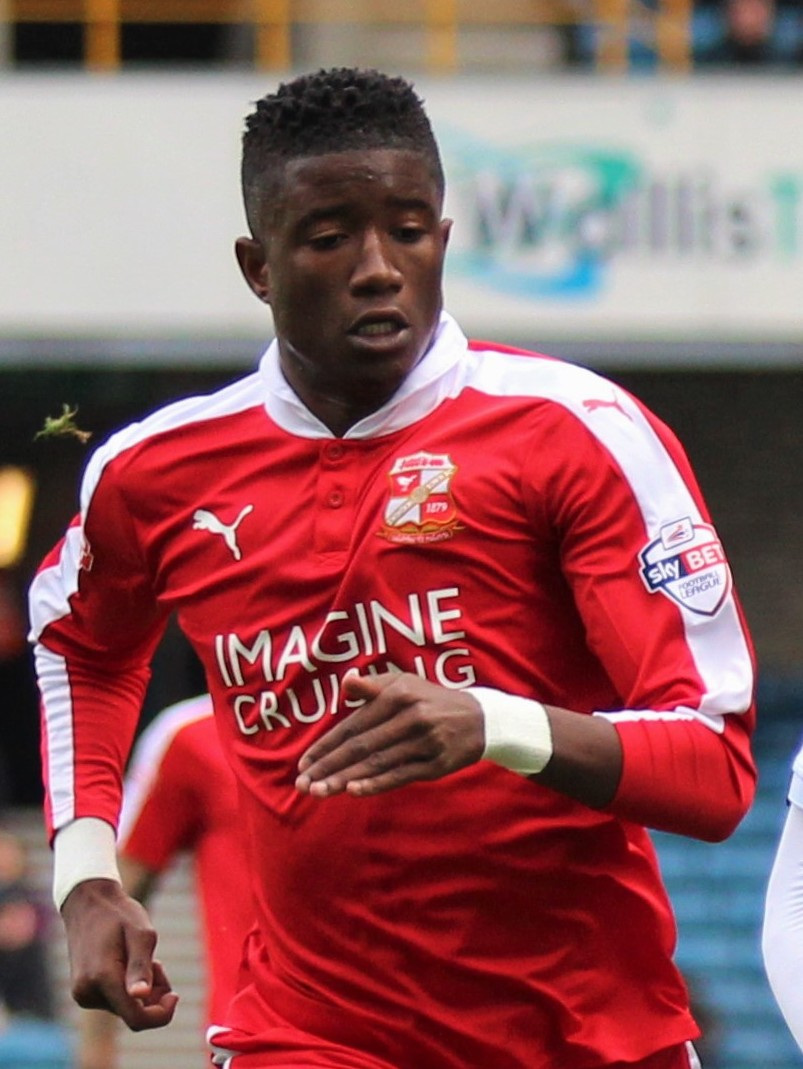
- Bangoura playing for Swindon Town in October 2015

Personal information
- Full name: Momar Bangoura
- Date of birth: 24 February 1994 (age 32)
- Place of birth: Dakar, Senegal
- Height: 1.80 m (5 ft 11 in)
- Position: Midfielder

Team information
- Current team: Cluses Scionzier Football Club

Youth career
- 2002–2003: Sainte-Marguerite
- 2003–2012: Marseille

Senior career*
Years	Team	Apps	(Gls)
2012–2015	Marseille	2	(0)
2012–2015	→ Marseille II	59	(1)
2015	Swindon Town	1	(0)
2018	Zirka Kropyvnytskyi	0	(0)
2020–2022	FC Échirolles	0	(0)
2022–	Cluses Scionzier Football Club	0	(0)
- * Club domestic league appearances and goals as of 2 June 2018

Momar Bangoura (born 24 February 1994) is a Senegalese footballer and Guinean origin. He currently plays for Cluses Scionzier Football Club in France.

== Club career ==
Bangoura last played for French club Marseille in Ligue 1. He plays as a midfielder and made his professional debut on 28 April 2012 in a league match against Lorient, where he appeared as a substitute.
