= Jérémy Balmy =

French footballer (born 1994)

Personal information
- Full name: Jérémy Fabrice Balmy
- Date of birth: 19 April 1994 (age 32)
- Place of birth: Melun, France
- Height: 1.73 m (5 ft 8 in)
- Position: Forward

Team information
- Current team: AS Rousson

Youth career
- 2008–2013: Le Havre

Senior career*
Years	Team	Apps	(Gls)
2013–2015	Notts County	2	(0)
2015	Oxford United	0	(0)
2015	→ Oxford City (loan)	6	(0)
2015–2016	Swindon Town	12	(0)
2016–2017	Le Havre B	11	(1)
2017–2018	Gonfreville	20	(8)
2018–2019	Trélissac	20	(0)
2019–2020	FC Mantois	19	(1)
2020–2024	Alès	69	(8)
2024–	AS Rousson		
- * Club domestic league appearances and goals as of 18 May 2024

Jérémy Fabrice Balmy (born 19 April 1994) is a French professional footballer who plays as a forward for an amateur side AS Rousson.

== Career ==
Balmy began his career with Le Havre, and went on trial at a number of English teams including Brighton & Hove Albion, Norwich City, Birmingham City and Notts County, before joining the latter in August 2013. He made his professional debut on 24 August 2013, in a 1–0 defeat against Stevenage.

Balmy joined Oxford United on 9 February 2015, on a short-term deal. He was loaned to Oxford City of the Conference North in March.

Following a trial with Swindon Town, Balmy signed for the club on an initial one-year contract. He was suspended by the club in April 2016 alongside Drissa Traoré and Brandon Ormonde-Ottewill, after pictures emerged on social media of the trio inhaling nitrous oxide gas.

In October 2016, Balmy returned to Le Havre to join their reserve squad.
