= Tom Smith (footballer, born 1998) =

English footballer

Personal information
- Full name: Tom Spencer Smith
- Date of birth: 25 February 1998 (age 28)
- Place of birth: Swindon, England
- Height: 1.76 m (5 ft 9 in)
- Position: Midfielder

Youth career
- 2008–2009: Bristol City
- 2009–2016: Swindon Town

Senior career*
Years	Team	Apps	(Gls)
2014–2018	Swindon Town	10	(1)
2017	→ Waterford (loan)	10	(1)
2017	→ Bath City (loan)	6	(2)
2017–2018	→ Bath City (loan)	4	(2)
2018	→ Bath City (loan)	17	(6)
2018–2019	Cheltenham Town	0	(0)
2018–2019	→ Bath City (loan)	29	(4)
2019–2024	Bath City	188	(26)
2021	→ Dagenham & Redbridge (loan)	7	(0)
2024–2025	Taunton Town	36	(9)
2025–	Dorchester Town	22	(5)
- * Club domestic league appearances and goals as of 19:56, 10 June 2026 2025 (UTC)

Thomas Spencer Smith (born 25 February 1998) is an English semi professional footballer who plays as an attacking midfielder. Currently unattached, he most recently played for Dorchester Town.

== Club career ==
=== Swindon Town ===
Smith was given the number 28 shirt at the start of the 2014–15 season and was an unused substitute for Swindon Town in games against Scunthorpe United (home), Gillingham (away) Fleetwood Town (away) and Leyton Orient (home). He made his professional football debut as a second half-substitute in the League One game against Preston North End. Handed the number 31 shirt for the 2015–16 season, he was involved in the Newport County Football League Trophy game as a used substitute. Smith scored his first goal for Swindon against Crewe Alexandra on 5 September 2015. After being assigned the number 15 jersey for the 2016–17 campaign, Smith made his first appearance of the season in an EFL Cup first round tie against Championship side Queens Park Rangers, replacing Yaser Kasim in the 65th minute. The game resulted in a 4–2 victory for the Championship side on penalties after a 2–2 draw in normal time. On 13 September 2016, Smith made his first start of the campaign, in Swindon's EFL Trophy group stage tie against Chelsea U23s. The game resulted in a 2–1 victory with Smith playing for the entire 90 minutes.

On 22 February 2017, Smith joined Irish side Waterford on loan, along with teammate Jake Evans, until June 2017. On 24 February, Smith made his Waterford debut in their 1–0 away defeat against Athlone Town, on the opening day of the 2017 campaign. On 10 March 2017, Smith scored his first goal for Waterford, in their 2–0 away victory over UCD, netting the visitors' second in the 85th minute. Smith made a big impact at Waterford, becoming a key player in the club's title bid. His loan ended in May 2017 and his last appearance came in a 3–0 defeat to the League of Ireland Champions Dundalk in the League of Ireland Cup.

On 12 October 2017, Smith joined National League South side Bath City on a one-month loan. Two days later, he made his debut for Bath during their FA Cup fourth qualifying round tie against Chelmsford City, in which he was awarded man of the match despite the 0–0 draw. Following an impressive first month at Bath, Smith's loan was extended until 6 January 2018. On 24 November 2017, Smith was recalled by parent club, Swindon, following increasing injury problems. On 8 December 2017, Smith returned to Bath on a one-month loan and went on to score in their FA Trophy tie against Hendon, which resulted in a 2–1 defeat. On 19 January 2018, Smith again rejoined Bath on loan for the remainder of the campaign.

He was released by Swindon at the end of the 2017–18 season.

=== Cheltenham Town ===
On 1 June 2018, following his release from Swindon, Smith agreed to join fellow League Two side, Cheltenham Town on a two-year deal.

On 20 September 2018, Smith returned to Bath City on a four-month loan. The deal was later extended for the rest of the season.

=== Bath City ===
On 2 July 2019, after several loan spells, Smith returned to Bath City on a permanent deal, signing a two-year contract. On 27 July 2020, Smith was the recipient of the Vanarama South Player of the Season award after an impressive season. On 26 February 2021, Smith joined National League side Dagenham & Redbridge on loan for the remainder of the 2020–21 season.

Smith departed Bath City following the conclusion of the 2023–24 season.

=== Taunton Town ===
On 12 June 2024, Smith joined Southern League Premier Division South club Taunton Town, named as the team's captain on arrival.

On conclusion of the 2024–25 season, Smith departed the club.

=== Dorchester Town ===
On 27 June 2025, Smith joined Southern League Premier Division South side Dorchester Town. After an impressive start to his Dorchester career, which included Smith scoring a hat-trick against Bideford in the FA Trophy, he suffered an ACL injury in a Dorset Senior Cup tie against Portland United in January 2026 which brought an early end to his season.

After the conclusion of the season, in which Dorchester were relegated, it was confirmed he would depart the club to continue his rehabilitation after surgery.

== Career statistics ==
As of match played 26 November 2025

Appearances and goals by club, season and competition
Club	Season	League			National Cup (Note: Includes FA Cup)		League Cup (Note: Includes EFL Cup and League of Ireland Cup)		Other		Total	
Club	Season	Division	Apps	Goals	Apps	Goals	Apps	Goals	Apps	Goals	Apps	Goals
Swindon Town	2014–15	League One	1	0	0	0	0	0	0	0	1	0
Swindon Town	2015–16	League One	1	1	0	0	0	0	1 (Note: Appearance in Football League Trophy)	0	2	1
Swindon Town	2016–17	League One	8	0	0	0	1	0	3 (Note: Appearances in EFL Trophy)	0	12	0
Swindon Town	2017–18	League Two	0	0	—		1	0	0	0	1	0
Swindon Town	Swindon Town total		10	1	0	0	2	0	4	0	16	1
Waterford (loan)	2017	LOI First Division	10	1	0	0	1	0	—		11	1
Bath City (loan)	2017–18	National League South	27	10	2	0	—		2 (Note: One appearance and one goal in FA Trophy, one appearance in Somerset Premier Cup)	1	31	11
Cheltenham Town	2018–19	League Two	0	0	—		1	0	0	0	1	0
Bath City (loan)	2018–19	National League South	29	4	3	1	—		4 (Note: Two appearances in FA Trophy, one appearance and one goal in Somerset Premier Cup, one appearance in National League South play-offs)	1	36	6
Bath City	2019–20	National League South	35	12	2	1	—		7 (Note: Five appearances and two goals in FA Trophy, one appearance and one goal in Somerset Premier Cup, one appearance in National League South play-offs)	3	44	16
Bath City	2020–21	National League South	13	3	3	0	—		3 (Note: Appearance(s) in FA Trophy)	2	19	5
Bath City	2021–22	National League South	36	2	3	0	—		5 (Note: One appearance in FA Trophy, four appearances and one goal in Somerset Premier Cup)	1	44	3
Bath City	2022–23	National League South	34	3	3	0	—		5 (Note: One appearance in FA Trophy, four appearances and one goal in Somerset Premier Cup)	1	42	4
Bath City	2023–24	National League South	36	3	3	0	—		4 (Note: Three appearances in FA Trophy, one appearance in National League South play-offs)	0	43	3
Bath City	Bath City total		244	40	22	2	—		35	10	301	52
Dagenham & Redbridge (loan)	2020–21	National League	7	0	—		—		—		7	0
Taunton Town	2024–25	Southern League; Premier Division South	36	9	5	3	—		4 (Note: Two appearances in FA Trophy, two appearances in Southern League Cup)	0	45	12
Dorchester Town	2025–26	Southern League; Premier Division South	22	5	2	0	—		5 (Note: Three appearances and three goals in FA Trophy, two appearances in Dorset Senior Cup)	3	29	8
Career total			329	56	29	5	4	0	48	13	410	74
