= Jamie Sendles-White =

Northern Irish footballer

Personal information
- Full name: Jamie Alexander Sendles-White
- Date of birth: 10 April 1994 (age 32)
- Place of birth: Kingston upon Thames, England
- Height: 6 ft 2 in (1.88 m)
- Position: Defender

Youth career
- –2009: Sutton United
- 2009–2012: Queens Park Rangers

Senior career*
Years	Team	Apps	(Gls)
2012–2015	Queens Park Rangers	0	(0)
2013	→ Colchester United (loan)	0	(0)
2014	→ Mansfield Town (loan)	7	(0)
2015–2016	Hamilton Academical	7	(0)
2016–2017	Swindon Town	15	(0)
2017–2018	Leyton Orient	13	(0)
2018	St Albans City	11	(2)
2018–2019	Torquay United	23	(0)
2019–2020	Crawley Town	14	(0)
2020–2021	Aldershot Town	29	(1)
2021–2022	Maidenhead United	3	(0)
2022–2023	Welling United	49	(0)
2023–2024	Yeovil Town	5	(1)
2024	Hemel Hempstead Town	5	(0)
Total		181	(4)

International career^{‡}
2012	Northern Ireland U19	3	(0)
2013	Northern Ireland U20	6	(0)
2013–2016	Northern Ireland U21	12	(0)
- * Club domestic league appearances and goals as of 12:06, 12 March 2024 (UTC) ‡ National team caps and goals as of 15:04, 14 November 2015 (UTC)

Jamie Alexander Sendles-White (born 10 April 1994) is a former professional footballer who played as a defender. Born in England, he represented Northern Ireland at youth level.

== Club career ==
Sendles-White signed for Queens Park Rangers at the age of fifteen and signed his first professional contract with the club on 1 January 2012, keeping him until 2013. In May 2013, Sendles-White signed a contract with the club on a one-year extension. In June 2014, Sendles-White then signed a one-year contract extension with the club. Sendles-White was released by the club at the end of the 2014–15 season.

On 20 September 2013, Sendles-White joined Colchester United on a one-month loan, but he failed to make an appearance.

He then went on to join Mansfield Town on loan again in October 2014, and had his loan extended the following month. Sendles-White made his Football League debut on 11 October 2014 at Fratton Park in a 1–1 away draw against Portsmouth in League Two. Sendles-White went on to make seven appearances before being recalled by his parent club on 8 December 2014.

After leaving Queens Park Rangers, Sendles-White went on trial at Swindon Town.

He signed for Scottish Premiership club Hamilton Academical in August 2015. On 7 November 2015, Sendles-White made his Hamilton debut in a 2–0 away defeat against Heart of Midlothian, replacing Jesús García Tena in the 37th minute. A couple of weeks later, Sendles-White made his first start for Hamilton in their 1–1 draw with Aberdeen, featuring for the entire 90 minutes.

On 29 January 2016, Sendles-White's contract at the club was terminated.

On 16 February 2016, Sendles-White signed for Swindon Town, agreeing a contract until the end of the 2015–16 season. Four days later, Sendles-White made his Swindon debut in their 3–2 victory against Blackpool, featuring for the entire 90 minutes. On 11 May 2016, Sendles-White signed a new one-year deal at the club after impressing within his first few months. On 17 September 2016, Sendles-White was ruled out for the remainder of the 2016–17 campaign after he ruptured the anterior cruciate ligament in his left knee following a collision with Tom Pope in Swindon's 2–1 defeat against Bury.

On 2 May 2017, Sendles-White announced that he would leave Swindon upon the expiry of his contract in June 2017.

On 1 August 2017, Sendles-White signed for Leyton Orient on a one-year deal. After gaining full match fitness, Sendles-White made his Leyton Orient debut a month later in their 4–1 home victory over Guiseley, replacing Henry Ochieng in the 80th minute. Sendles-White's contract was mutually terminated by Leyton Orient on 1 March 2018.

Following his release from Orient, Sendles-White dropped a division to join National League South side St Albans City. On the same day, he made his debut in St Albans' 3–1 away defeat against Hungerford Town, playing the full 90 minutes. On 20 March 2018, Sendles-White scored his first goal for the club during their 2–0 away victory against Weston-super-Mare.

After a trial at former club Swindon Town in the summer of 2018, he joined Torquay United in September. He made his debut for the Gulls in a 7–0 victory against Lymington Town in the FA Cup. After winning the league and promotion to the national league, Sendles-White announced he would leave the club upon the expiry of his contract.

On 2 September 2019, Sendles-White signed for Crawley Town on a one-year deal with an option for a further year. He left the club at the end of the season after failing to agree terms on a new contract.

On 7 July 2020, Sendles-White agreed a one-year deal with Aldershot Town and was named captain for the 2020/2021 season. He rejected a contract offer from the Shots at the end of the season.

Sendles-White agreed a contract with Southend United in October 2021 but the manager was relieved of his duties the next day, before joining Maidenhead United on a short-term deal on 20 November 2021. He left the Magpies in January 2022.

In March 2022, Sendles-White signed for National League South side Welling United and made his debut in a 2–1 defeat against Hampton & Richmond Borough. He was named captain for the final 10 games of the season and helped save the club from relegation.

In May 2023, Sendles-White signed for fellow National League South side Yeovil Town. On 8 February 2024, Sendles-White left Yeovil Town after the mutual agreement to termination of his contract due to limited playing opportunities. Following his departure, he joined fellow National League South side Hemel Hempstead Town.

On 16 October 2024, Sendles-White announced his retirement from playing.

== International career ==
Having made three appearances for Northern Ireland U19, Sendles-White was called up by Northern Ireland U21 on 17 May 2013. Sendles-White made his Northern Ireland U21 debut on 30 May 2013, in a 3–0 loss against Cyprus U21.

== Career statistics ==
As of match played 5 September 2023

Appearances and goals by club, season and competition
Club	Season	League			National Cup (Note: Includes FA Cup)		League Cup (Note: Includes EFL Cup)		Other		Total	
Club	Season	Division	Apps	Goals	Apps	Goals	Apps	Goals	Apps	Goals	Apps	Goals
Queens Park Rangers	2012–13	Premier League	0	0	0	0	0	0	—		0	0
Queens Park Rangers	2013–14	Championship	0	0	0	0	0	0	0	0	0	0
Queens Park Rangers	2014–15	Premier League	0	0	0	0	0	0	—		0	0
Queens Park Rangers	Total		0	0	0	0	0	0	0	0	0	0
Colchester United (loan)	2013–14	League One	0	0	0	0	0	0	0	0	0	0
Mansfield Town (loan)	2014–15	League Two	7	0	1	0	0	0	0	0	8	0
Hamilton Academical	2015–16	Scottish Premiership	7	0	0	0	0	0	—		7	0
Swindon Town	2015–16	League One	10	0	0	0	0	0	0	0	10	0
Swindon Town	2016–17	League One	5	0	0	0	1	0	1 (Note: Appearance(s) in EFL Trophy)	0	7	0
Swindon Town	Total		15	0	0	0	1	0	1	0	17	0
Leyton Orient	2017–18	National League	13	0	2	0	—		1 (Note: Appearance(s) in FA Trophy)	0	16	0
St Albans City	2017–18	National League South	11	2	—		—		0	0	11	2
Torquay United	2018–19	National League South	23	0	0	0	—		1	0	24	0
Crawley Town	2019–20	League Two	14	0	0	0	0	0	3	0	17	0
Aldershot Town	2020–21	National League	29	1	1	0	—		1	0	31	1
Maidenhead United	2021–22	National League	3	0	0	0	—		0	0	3	0
Welling United	2021–22	National League South	10	0	0	0	—		0	0	10	0
Welling United	2022–23	National League South	39	0	1	0	—		2	0	42	0
Welling United	Total		49	0	1	0	—		2	0	52	0
Yeovil Town	2023–24	National League South	5	1	0	0	—		0	0	5	1
Hemel Hempstead Town	2023–24	National League South	5	0	—		—		—		5	0
Career total			181	4	5	0	1	0	9	0	196	4
