= 2016–17 Swindon Town F.C. season =

Swindon Town
2016–17 season
- Chairman: Lee Power
- Manager: Luke Williams (until 5 May 2017)
- Stadium: County Ground
- League One: 22nd (relegated)
- FA Cup: First round (Eliminated by Eastleigh)
- EFL Cup: First round (Eliminated by Queens Park Rangers)
- EFL Trophy: Second round (Eliminated by Luton Town)
- Top goalscorer: League: Jonathan Obika (6 goals); All: Jonathan Obika (6 goals); Luke Norris (6 goals)
- Highest home attendance: 9,023 vs Coventry City (6 August 2016)
- Lowest home attendance: 1,692 vs Luton Town (6 December 2016)
- Average home league attendance: 6,527
Home colours	Away colours

The 2016–17 season is Swindon Town's 138th season in their existence and their fifth consecutive season in League One. Along with competing in League One, the club will also participate in the FA Cup, EFL Cup and EFL Trophy. The season covers the period from 1 July 2016 to 30 June 2017.

== Players ==
=== First team squad ===
As of 30 April 2017

No.	Name	Nat	Position	Since	Date of birth (age)	Signed from	Games	Goals
Goalkeepers
1	Lawrence Vigouroux	(Chile)	GK	2016	19 November 1993 (aged 23)	(England) Liverpool	82	0
12	Will Henry	(England)	GK	2015	6 July 1998 (aged 18)	Academy	9	0
Defenders
2	Nathan Thompson	(England)	CB	2008	9 November 1990 (aged 26)	Academy	184	4
3	Brandon Ormonde-Ottewill	(England)	LB	2015	21 December 1995 (aged 21)	(England) Arsenal	56	2
6	Jamie Sendles-White	(Northern Ireland)	CB	2016	10 April 1994 (aged 23)	(Scotland) Hamilton Academical	17	0
11	James Brophy	(England)	LB	2015	25 July 1994 (aged 22)	(England) Edgware Town	64	1
21	Fankaty Dabo	(England)	RB	2017	11 October 1995 (aged 21)	on loan from (England) Chelsea	15	1
25	Dion Conroy	(England)	CB	2017	11 December 1995 (aged 21)	(England) Chelsea	14	0
27	Bradley Barry	(England)	RB	2015	13 February 1995 (aged 22)	(England) Brighton & Hove Albion	64	1
28	Lloyd Jones	(England)	CB	2016	7 October 1995 (aged 21)	on loan from (England) Liverpool	29	2
29	Raphael Rossi Branco	(Brazil)	CB	2013	25 July 1990 (aged 26)	(England) Whitehawk	130	7
Midfielders
4	Conor Thomas	(England)	DM	2016	29 October 1993 (aged 23)	(England) Coventry City	37	1
5	Anton Rodgers	(Republic of Ireland)	CM	2014	26 January 1993 (aged 24)	(England) Oldham Athletic	79	6
7	Ben Gladwin	(England)	CM	2017	8 June 1992 (aged 24)	on loan from (England) Queens Park Rangers	88	15
8	Yaser Kasim	(Iraq)	CM	2013	10 May 1991 (aged 25)	(England) Brighton & Hove Albion	139	8
10	John Goddard	(England)	RW	2016	2 June 1993 (aged 23)	(England) Woking	48	3
14	Ellis Iandolo	(England)	RW	2015	22 August 1997 (aged 19)	(England) Maidstone United	28	1
16	Jordan Stewart	(Northern Ireland)	AM	2015	31 March 1995 (aged 22)	(Northern Ireland) Glentoran	10	1
20	Charlie Colkett	(England)	CM	2017	4 September 1996 (aged 20)	on loan from (England) Chelsea	19	1
22	Jesse Starkey	(England)	CM	2017	1 September 1995 (aged 21)	(England) Brighton & Hove Albion	1	0
23	Rohan Ince	(England)	DM	2017	8 November 1992 (aged 24)	on loan from (England) Brighton & Hove Albion	14	2
35	Jordan Young	(Scotland)	LW	2016	31 July 1999 (aged 17)	Academy	6	1
Forwards
9	Jonathan Obika	(England)	FW	2014	12 September 1990 (aged 26)	(England) Tottenham Hotspur	108	28
17	Islam Feruz	(Scotland)	FW	2017	10 September 1995 (aged 21)	on loan from (England) Chelsea	4	0
19	Nicky Ajose	(England)	FW	2017	7 October 1991 (aged 25)	on loan from (England) Charlton Athletic	76	40
24	Jermaine Hylton	(England)	FW	2015	28 June 1993 (aged 23)	(England) Redditch United	46	1
33	Luke Norris	(England)	FW	2016	3 June 1993 (aged 23)	(England) Gillingham	46	6
36	Scott Twine	(England)	FW	2016	14 July 1999 (aged 17)	Academy	1	0

== Transfers ==
=== In ===
Date from	Position	Nationality	Name	From	Fee	Ref.
1 July 2016	RW	(England)	John Goddard	Woking	Undisclosed	
1 July 2016	GK	(Chile)	Lawrence Vigouroux	Liverpool	Undisclosed	
4 July 2016	CM	(England)	Conor Thomas	Coventry City	Free transfer	
6 July 2016	ST	(England)	Luke Norris	Gillingham	Undisclosed	
18 August 2016	ST	(England)	Nathan Delfouneso	Blackburn Rovers	Free transfer	
31 August 2016	CM	(Republic of Ireland)	Sean Murray	Watford	Free transfer	
6 December 2016	LB	(Northern Ireland)	Rhys Sharpe	Notts County	Free transfer	
27 January 2017	CB	(England)	Dion Conroy	Chelsea	Undisclosed	
31 January 2017	CM	(England)	Jesse Starkey	Brighton & Hove Albion	Undisclosed	

=== Out ===
Date from	Position	Nationality	Name	To	Fee	Ref.
23 June 2016	CF	(England)	Michael Smith	Portsmouth	Undisclosed	
27 June 2016	CF	(England)	Nicky Ajose	Charlton Athletic	Undisclosed	
1 July 2016	CF	(France)	Jeremy Balmy	Le Havre (Note: Following Balmy's release, he signed for Le Havre.)	Released	
1 July 2016	CF	(England)	Jamie Calvin	Kings Langley (Note: Following Calvin's release, he signed for Kings Langley.)	Released	
1 July 2016	CF	(England)	Josh Cooke	AFC Telford United (Note: Following Cooke's release, he signed for AFC Telford United.)	Released	
1 July 2016	CM	(England)	Lee Marshall	Bath City (Note: Following Marshall's release, he signed for Bath City.)	Released	
1 July 2016	LM	(France)	Fabien Robert	Forest Green Rovers (Note: Following Roberts' release, he signed for Forest Green Rovers.)	Released	
1 July 2016	CF	(England)	Miles Storey	Aberdeen	Free transfer	
1 July 2016	CM	(Ivory Coast)	Drissa Traoré	Forest Green Rovers (Note: Following Traoré's release, he signed for Forest Green Rovers.)	Released	
11 November 2016	GK	(England)	Tyrell Belford	Oxford City (Note: Following Belford's release, he signed for Oxford City.)	Released	
1 January 2017	LB	(Northern Ireland)	Rhys Sharpe	Matlock Town (Note: Following Sharpe's release, he signed for Matlock Town.)	Released	
21 January 2017	CF	(England)	Nathan Delfouneso	Blackpool	Free transfer	
31 January 2017	CM	(Republic of Ireland)	Sean Murray	Colchester United	Free transfer	

=== Loans in ===
Date from	Position	Nationality	Name	From	Date until	Ref.
5 August 2016	CM	(Wales)	Michael Doughty	Queens Park Rangers	2 January 2017 (Note: On 2 January 2017, Queens Park Rangers recalled Michael Doughty.)	
5 August 2016	CB	(England)	Lloyd Jones	Liverpool	End of Season	
12 August 2016	RB	(England)	Darnell Furlong	Queens Park Rangers	2 January 2017 (Note: On 2 January 2017, Queens Park Rangers recalled Darnell Furlong.)	
10 January 2017	CM	(England)	Ben Gladwin	Queens Park Rangers	End of Season	
11 January 2017	CM	(England)	Charlie Colkett	Chelsea	End of Season	
11 January 2017	CF	(Scotland)	Islam Feruz	Chelsea	End of Season	
11 January 2017	RB	(England)	Fankaty Dabo	Chelsea	End of Season	
31 January 2017	CF	(England)	Nicky Ajose	Charlton Athletic	End of Season	
31 January 2017	DM	(England)	Rohan Ince	Brighton & Hove Albion	End of Season	

=== Loans out ===
Date from	Position	Nationality	Name	To	End Date	Ref.
1 July 2016	GK	(England)	Tyrell Belford	Southport	11 November 2016 (Note: Belford's loan was terminated on 11 November 2016, due to his release from Swindon Town.)	
4 October 2016	CF	(England)	Jermaine Hylton	Guiseley	6 December 2016 (Note: Hylton's loan was terminated on 6 December 2016.)	
22 February 2017	LM	(England)	Jake Evans	Waterford	End of Season	
22 February 2017	CM	(England)	Tom Smith	Waterford	End of Season	

== Friendlies ==
=== Pre-season friendlies ===
On 13 May 2016, Woking announced that they would be hosting Swindon Town in a pre-season friendly.

9 July 2016 Friendly	Swindon Supermarine	0–6	Swindon Town	South Marston
15:00		Report	Hylton 17', 38' (pen.); Barry 52'; Ormonde-Ottewill 68'; Obika 81'; Iandolo 90'	Stadium: Webbswood Stadium; Referee: Daniel Lamport

12 July 2016 Friendly	(Republic of Ireland) Shelbourne	0–1	Swindon Town	Dublin
19:00		Report	Obika 59'	Stadium: Tolka Park; Attendance: 200; Referee: T. Connelly

16 July 2016 Friendly	(Republic of Ireland) University College Dublin	1–5	Swindon Town	Dublin
14:00	Swan 90' (pen.)	Report	Stewart 20'; Sendles-White 45'; Thomas 55'; Evans 64'; Brophy 73'	Stadium: UCD Bowl; Referee: Derek Tomney

19 July 2016 Friendly	Swindon Town	1–2	Reading	Swindon
19:45	Goddard 45'	Report	Rakels 79'; Stacey 88'	Stadium: County Ground

23 July 2016 Friendly	Woking	3–1	Swindon Town	Woking
15:00	Ansah 44'; Sam-Yorke 67', 84' (pen.)		Ormonde-Ottewill 90'	Stadium: Kingfield Stadium; Referee: Dean Treleaven

27 July 2016 Friendly	Swindon Town	0–3	(Wales) Swansea City	Swindon
19:45		Report	Ayew 50'; Fulton 54'; Barrow 71'	Stadium: County Ground

30 July 2016 Friendly	Yeovil Town	2–1	Swindon Town	Yeovil
13:00	Eaves 16'; Khan 74'	Report	Obika 18'	Stadium: Huish Park

== Competitions ==
=== Overview ===
Competition	Record							
Competition	G	W	D	L	GF	GA	GD	Win %
League One	46	11	11	24	44	66	−22	23.91
FA Cup	2	0	1	1	2	4	−2	0.00
EFL Cup	1	0	1	0	2	2	+0	0.00
EFL Trophy	4	1	2	1	5	5	+0	25.00
Total	53	12	15	26	53	77	−24	22.64

Updated to match played 30 April 2017
Source: Competitions

=== League One ===
==== League table ====
Pos	Team	Pld	W	D	L	GF	GA	GD	Pts	Promotion, qualification or relegation
20	Gillingham	46	12	14	20	59	79	−20	50	
21	Port Vale (R)	46	12	13	21	45	70	−25	49	Relegation to EFL League Two
22	Swindon Town (R)	46	11	11	24	44	66	−22	44	Relegation to EFL League Two
23	Coventry City (R)	46	9	12	25	37	68	−31	39	Relegation to EFL League Two
24	Chesterfield (R)	46	9	10	27	43	78	−35	37	Relegation to EFL League Two

Source: BBC Sport
Rules for classification: 1) Points; 2) Goal difference; 3) Number of goals scored
(R) Relegated

==== Results summary ====
Overall								Home						Away					
Pld	W	D	L	GF	GA	GD	Pts	W	D	L	GF	GA	GD	W	D	L	GF	GA	GD
45	11	11	23	44	63	−19	44	7	6	10	23	24	−1	4	5	13	21	39	−18

Last updated: 22 April 2017.
Source: Swindon Town

==== Matches ====
Won Drawn Lost Postponed

On 22 June 2016, the fixtures for the forthcoming season were announced.

6 August 2016 1	Swindon Town	1–0	Coventry City	Swindon
15:00 BST	Sendles-White (yellow card) 53'; Kasim 86'	Report	Sordell (yellow card) 32'; Haynes (yellow card) 58'	Stadium: County Ground

13 August 2016 2	Chesterfield	3–1	Swindon Town	Chesterfield
15:00 BST	Liddle 22'; O'Shea 45' (pen.); Evans 64'	Report	Kasim (yellow card) 45'; Ormonde-Ottewill (yellow card) 60'; Furlong (yellow card) 62' (goal) 88'; Sendles-White (yellow card) 84'	Stadium: Proact Stadium; Attendance: 5,378; Referee: Carl Boyeson

16 August 2016 3	Gillingham	1–1	Swindon Town	Gillingham
19:45 BST	Ehmer (yellow card) 25'; Konchesky (yellow card) 54'; Wright (yellow card) 65'; Jackson (yellow card) 70'; Donnelly 71'	Report	Rodgers (yellow card) 31'; Doughty 55' (pen.); Barry (yellow card) 76'; Vigouroux (yellow card) 81'; Ormonde-Ottewill (red card)	Stadium: Priestfield; Attendance: 5,512; Referee: Keith Stroud

20 August 2016 4	Swindon Town	1–0	Port Vale	Swindon
15:00 BST	Barry 47'; Kasim (yellow card) 81'; Stewart (yellow card) 83'; Norris (yellow card) 90'	Report	Grant (yellow card) 64'; Tavares (yellow card) 67'	Stadium: County Ground; Attendance: 6,182; Referee: Dean Whitestone

3 September 2016 5	Peterborough United	2–2	Swindon Town	Peterborough
12:15 BST	Edwards 36' (yellow card) 44'; Maddison 64' (pen.)	Report	Doughty 51' (pen.); Jones (yellow card) 54'; Baldwin 77' (o.g.)	Stadium: ABAX Stadium

10 September 2016 6	Oxford United	2–0	Swindon Town	Oxford
15:00 BST	Thomas (yellow card) 39'; Maguire 44' (pen.), 61'; Lundstram (yellow card) 68'; MacDonald (yellow card) 90+6'	Report	Thomas (yellow card) 34'; Jones (yellow card) 45+2' (yellow-red card) 65'; Vigouroux (yellow card) 56' (yellow-red card) 90+4'; Barry (yellow card) 63'	Stadium: The Kassam Stadium

17 September 2016 7	Swindon Town	1–2	Bury	Swindon
15:00 BST	Barry (yellow card) 31'; Yaser Kasim (yellow card) 33'; Raphael Branco (yellow card) 34'; Obika 64'; Thompson (yellow card) 86'	Report	Hope 13', 45' (yellow card) 38'; Mellis (yellow card) 20'; Soares (yellow card) 34'; Kay (yellow card) 66'; Mayor (yellow card) 88'; Pope (yellow card) 90+2'	Stadium: County Ground; Attendance: 6,931 (244 Away Fans); Referee: Charles Breakspear

20 September 2016 8	Swindon Town	1–2	Bristol Rovers	Swindon
19:45 BST	Jones 6'; Yaser Kasim (yellow card) 43'; Furlong (yellow card) 67'; Thomas (yellow card) 70'	Report	Sinclair (yellow card) 31'; Gaffney (yellow card) 43'; Bodin (yellow card) 44'; Brown (yellow card) 50'; Taylor 83' (pen.); Raphael Branco 84' (o.g.); Lockyer (yellow card) 87'; Harrison (yellow card) 90+2'	Stadium: County Ground; Attendance: 6,760 (414 Away Fans); Referee: Oliver Langford

24 September 2016 9	Oldham Athletic	0–2	Swindon Town	Oldham
15:00 BST	Banks (yellow card) 32'; Fané (yellow card) 82'; Burgess (yellow card) 86'	Report	Thompson (yellow card) 6'; Obika 18'; Ormonde-Ottewill 55'	Stadium: Boundary Park; Attendance: 3,403; Referee: Mark Haywood

27 September 2016 10	Swindon Town	1–3	Northampton Town	Swindon
19:45 BST	Murray 67'	Report	Beautyman 7'; Taylor (yellow card) 57'; O'Toole 76'; Gorré 82'; Buchanan (yellow card) 90'	Stadium: County Ground; Attendance: 6,590; Referee: Brett Huxtable

1 October 2016 11	Shrewsbury Town	1–1	Swindon Town	Shrewsbury
15:00 BST	Toney 44'; Deegan (yellow card) 48' (yellow-red card) 88'; Brown (yellow card) 56'	Report	Goddard 9'; Furlong (yellow card) 70'	Stadium: Greenhous Meadow; Attendance: 5,103; Referee: John Brooks

8 October 2016 12	Swindon Town	0–1	Bolton Wanderers	Swindon
13:00 BST	Delfouneso (yellow card) 43'; Goddard (yellow card) 70'; Raphael Branco (red card) 90+2'	Report	Madine (yellow card) 21'; Wheater (yellow card) 79'; Ormonde-Ottewill 86' (o.g.); Beevers (yellow card) 90+4'; Vela (yellow card) 90+4'	Stadium: County Ground; Attendance: 7,023; Referee: Neil Swarbrick

15 October 2016 13	AFC Wimbledon	0–0	Swindon Town	Kingston upon Thames
15:00 BST	Robinson (yellow card) 30'; Taylor (penalty missed) 33'; Parrett (yellow card) 62'; Bulman (yellow card) 68'; Charles (yellow card) 90+1'	Report	Yaser Kasim (yellow card) 32'; Thomas (yellow card) 69'; Thompson (yellow card) 79'; Vigouroux (yellow card) 89'	Stadium: Kingsmeadow Stadium; Attendance: 4,800; Referee: John Busby

18 October 2016 14	Swindon Town	3–0	Rochdale	Swindon
19:45 BST	Furlong 24' (yellow card) 72'; Delfouneso 32' (yellow card) 45+2'; Thompson 80'	Report	Henderson (penalty missed) 47'; Keane (yellow card) 48'; Andrew (yellow card) 52'; Bunney (red card) 72'; Camps (yellow card) 77'; Cannon (yellow card) 79'	Stadium: County Ground; Attendance: 6,048; Referee: Gavin Ward

22 October 2016 15	Swindon Town	0–2	Walsall	Swindon
15:00 BST	Barry (yellow card) 50'	Report	Oztumer 17', 51'; Toner (yellow card) 60'; Bakayoko (yellow card) 90+2'	Stadium: County Ground; Attendance: 6,655; Referee: Darren England

29 October 2016 16	Scunthorpe United	4–1	Swindon Town	Scunthorpe
15:00 BST	Madden 15', 45+1'; Holmes 21' van Veen 43'; Bishop (yellow card) 49'; Dawson (yellow card) 79'	Report	Thompson 52' (yellow card) 77'; Furlong 58'; Stewart (yellow card) 90+2'	Stadium: Glanford Park; Attendance: 4,262; Referee: Seb Stockbridge

12 November 2016 17	Swindon Town	3–0	Charlton Athletic	Swindon
12:00 GMT	Thomas (yellow card) 40'; Fox 43' (og.); Jones 50'; Goddard 86'	Report	Jackson (yellow card) 81'	Stadium: County Ground; Attendance: 6,599; Referee: Tim Robinson

19 November 2016 18	Rochdale	4–0	Swindon Town	Rochdale
15:00 GMT	Rathbone (yellow card) 22'; Bunney 29' (yellow card) 30'; Lund 55'; Davies 57', 66' (pen.)	Report	Rodgers (yellow card) 25'; Goddard (yellow card) 31'; Raphael Branco (yellow card) 54'	Stadium: Crown Oil Arena; Attendance: 2,196; Referee: Darren Handley

22 November 2016 19	Southend United	1–1	Swindon Town	Southend-on-Sea
19:45 GMT	Atkinson 12'; Demetriou (yellow card) 22'	Report	Thomas (yellow card) 45+1'; Obika 73'; Raphael Branco (yellow card) 82'	Stadium: Roots Hall Stadium; Attendance: 5,715; Referee: Darren Deadman

26 November 2016 20	Swindon Town	1–0	Bradford City	Swindon
15:00 GMT	Rodgers 19'; Iandolo (yellow card) 64'; Doughty (yellow card) 85'	Report	Knight-Percival (yellow card) 18'; Vincelot (yellow card) 81'	Stadium: County Ground; Attendance: 6,344; Referee: Graham Horwood

10 December 2016 21	Sheffield United	4–0	Swindon Town	Sheffield
15:00 GMT	Freeman (yellow card) 7'; Duffy 52', 60'; Coutts 54' (yellow card) 67'; Lavery 77'	Report	Branco (yellow card) 83'	Stadium: Bramall Lane; Attendance: 19,196; Referee: Gavin Ward

17 December 2016 22	Swindon Town	1–1	Fleetwood Town	Swindon
15:00 GMT	Norris 12'; Thompson (yellow card) 17'; Branco (yellow card) 74'	Report	Ball 22'; Pond (yellow card) 51'; Bolger (yellow card) 88'	Stadium: County Ground; Attendance: 6,143; Referee: Darren Deadman

26 December 2016 23	Millwall	2–0	Swindon Town	Bermondsey, London
15:00 GMT	Gregory 10', 65', (yellow card) 73'; Webster (yellow card) 57'; Craig (yellow card) 59'	Report	Smith (yellow card) 42'; Kasim (yellow card) 73'; Furlong (yellow card) 75'	Stadium: The Den; Attendance: 8,515; Referee: Nick Kinseley

30 December 2016 24	Milton Keynes Dons	3–2	Swindon Town	Milton Keynes
19:45 GMT	Agard 9', 26'; Maynard 54'	Report	Norris 35', (yellow card) 52'; Branco (yellow card) 56', (goal) 66'	Stadium: Stadium mk Attendance: 9,385; Referee: Ben Toner

2 January 2017 25	Swindon Town	0–0	Southend United	Swindon
15:00 GMT	Rodgers (yellow card) 32'; Branco (yellow card) 60'	Report	Thompson (yellow card) 27'; Demetriou (yellow card) 62'	Stadium: County Ground; Attendance: 7,102; Referee: Kevin Johnson

7 January 2017 26	Swindon Town	1–1	Shrewsbury Town	Swindon
15:00 GMT	Goddard 55' (pen.); Brophy (yellow card) 68' (yellow-red card) 70'	Report	Dodds (yellow card) 29'; Nsiala (red card) 53'; Sadler 80'; El-Abd (yellow card) 88'	Stadium: County Ground; Attendance: 6,137; Referee: Nigel Miller

14 January 2017 27	Bolton Wanderers	1–2	Swindon Town	Bolton
15:00 GMT	Wheater 48', (yellow card) 72'; Beevers (yellow card) 79'	Report	Branco (yellow card) 37'; Kasim (yellow card) 47', (goal) 89'; Gladwin 65'	Stadium: Macron Stadium; Attendance: 13,955; Referee: Mark Heywood

21 January 2017 28	Swindon Town	0–1	Peterborough United	Swindon
15:00 GMT	Thompson (yellow card) 26'; Jones (yellow card) 62'; Gladwin (yellow card) 65'	Report	Smith (yellow card) 37'; Maddison (yellow card) 65'	Stadium: County Ground; Attendance: 6,514; Referee: Trevor Kettle

28 January 2017 29	Bristol Rovers	1–0	Swindon Town	Bristol
12:30 GMT	Bodin 29'; Sweeney (yellow card) 35'	Report	Thompson (yellow card) 57'	Stadium: Memorial Stadium; Attendance: 10,557; Referee: James Linington

5 February 2017 30	Swindon Town	1–2	Oxford United	Swindon
12:00 GMT	Dabo 19' (yellow card) 90+7'; Norris (yellow card) 25'; Jones (yellow card) 32'; Gladwin (yellow card) 45+3'; Vigouroux (red card) 90+3'; Brophy (yellow card) 90+5'	Report	Sercombe 70'; Hall 73' (yellow card) 74'; Edwards (yellow card) 90+4'	Stadium: County Ground; Attendance: 10,658; Referee: Darren Deadman

11 February 2017 31	Bury	1–0	Swindon Town	Bury
15:00 GMT	Vaughan 37' (pen.), (yellow card) 42'; Brown (yellow card) 79'; Burgess (yellow card) 90'; Barnett (yellow card) 90+4'; Leigh (yellow card) 90+5'	Report	Gladwin (yellow card) 14'; Conroy (yellow card) 86'	Stadium: Gigg Lane; Attendance: 2,713; Referee: Mark Brown

14 February 2017 32	Northampton Town	2–1	Swindon Town	Northampton
19:45 GMT	Smith (yellow card) 36'; Jones 64' (og.); O'Toole 82'	Report	Dabo (yellow card) 7'; Colkett (yellow card) 36'; Gladwin (yellow card) 44'; Branco (yellow card) 58'; Norris 81'	Stadium: Sixfields Stadium; Attendance: 5,094; Referee: Darren Handley

18 February 2017 33	Swindon Town	0–0	Oldham Athletic	Swindon
15:00 GMT	Ince (yellow card) 72'; Gladwin (yellow card) 76'; Barry (yellow card) 90+2'	Report	O'Neill (yellow card) 9'	Stadium: County Ground; Attendance: 6,773; Referee: Rob Lewis

25 February 2017 34	Coventry City	1–3	Swindon Town	Coventry
15:00 GMT	Foley (yellow card) 84'; Thomas 90+1'	Report	Ajose 32', 71'; Obika 38'; Colkett (yellow card) 59'; Barry (yellow card) 76'; Thomas (yellow card) 90+5'	Stadium: Ricoh Arena; Attendance: 9,543; Referee: Graham Salisbury

28 February 2017 35	Swindon Town	3–1	Gillingham	Swindon
19:45 GMT	Ince 56'; Obika 61'; Branco 75'	Report	McDonald 10'; Wagstaff (yellow card) 90+4'	Stadium: County Ground; Attendance: 6,133; Referee: Roger East

4 March 2017 36	Swindon Town	0–1	Chesterfield	Swindon
15:00 GMT		Report	Hird (yellow card) 74'; Jones (yellow card) 84'; Evans (yellow card) 90+2'; Mitchell 90+3'	Stadium: County Ground; Attendance: 6,691; Referee: Chris Sarginson

11 March 2017 37	Port Vale	3–2	Swindon Town	Stoke-on-Trent
15:00 GMT	Eagles 36'; Hooper 50', 87', (yellow card) 90+7'	Report	Thompson (yellow card) 22'; Ajose 35'; Ormonde-Ottewill (yellow card) 49'; Branco (yellow card) 78'; Barry (red card) 86'; Norris 90'	Stadium: Vale Park; Attendance: 4,510; Referee: Geoff Eltringham

14 March 2017 38	Swindon Town	2–4	Sheffield United	Swindon
19:45 GMT	Colkett 46'; Gladwin 53'	Report	Lavery 29'; Freeman 35'; O'Shea 58'; Basham (yellow card) 61'; Coutts 90+2' (pen.)	Stadium: County Ground; Attendance: 7,012; Referee: Oliver Langford

18 March 2017 39	Bradford City	2–1	Swindon Town	Bradford
15:00 GMT	Meredith (yellow card) 28'; McMahon (yellow card) 36'; Wyke 85', 90+1'	Report	Gladwin (yellow card) 17'; Dabo (yellow card) 39'; Conroy (yellow card) 64'; Ajose 75'; Colkett (yellow card) 90'	Stadium: Valley Parade; Attendance: 17,916; Referee: Seb Stockbridge

25 March 2017 40	Swindon Town	1–0	Millwall	Swindon
13:30 GMT	Thompson (yellow card) 89'; Conroy (yellow card) 90+2'; Thomas 90+5'	Report	Gregory (yellow card) 20'; Williams (yellow card) 87'	Stadium: County Ground; Attendance: 7,038; Referee: John Busby

1 April 2017 41	Fleetwood Town	0–1	Swindon Town	Fleetwood
15:00 BST	Hunter (yellow card) 45'; Davies (yellow card) 52'; Eastham (yellow card) 58'	Report	Branco (yellow card) 44'; Thompson (yellow card) 70'; Ince (yellow card) 77'; Ajose 81'	Stadium: Highbury Stadium; Attendance: 3,128; Referee: David Webb

8 April 2017 42	Swindon Town	1–1	Milton Keynes Dons	Swindon
15:00 BST	Ince (yellow card) 39'; Obika 90'; Colkett (yellow card) 90+4'	Report	Walsh (yellow card) 34'; Agard 43' (pen.); Lewington (yellow card) 90+5'	Stadium: County Ground; Attendance: 7,946; Referee: Graham Salisbury

14 April 2017 43	Swindon Town	0–0	AFC Wimbledon	Swindon
15:00 BST		Report	Soares (yellow card) 24'; Francomb (yellow card) 41'; Robinson (yellow card) 50'	Stadium: County Ground; Attendance: 7,716; Referee: Michael Salisbury

17 April 2017 44	Walsall	1–0	Swindon Town	Walsall
15:00 BST	O'Connor (yellow card) 56'; Edwards 85'	Report		Stadium: Bescot Stadium; Attendance: 5,196; Referee: Ross Joyce

22 April 2017 45	Swindon Town	1–2	Scunthorpe United	Swindon
15:00 BST	Branco (yellow card) 41'; Ince 85'	Report	Wallace 5'; Toney (yellow card) 45+1'; Mantom 71'	Stadium: County Ground; Attendance: 7,579; Referee: Nick Kinseley

30 April 2017 46	Charlton Athletic	3–0	Swindon Town	Charlton
12:00 BST	Magennis 14'; Bauer (yellow card) 33'; Forster-Caskey 43'; Holmes 66'	Report	Starkey (yellow card) 49'	Stadium: The Valley; Attendance: 11,932; Referee: John Brooks

=== FA Cup ===
4 November 2016 First round	Eastleigh	1–1	Swindon Town	Eastleigh
19:55 GMT	Mandron 64'; Clarke (yellow card) 69'	Report	Raphael Branco (yellow card) 66'; Doughty 69' (pen.)	Stadium: Silverlake Stadium; Attendance: 3,312; Referee: Oliver Langford

15 November 2016 First round replay	Swindon Town	1–3	Eastleigh	Swindon
19:45 GMT	Delfouneso 79'; Jones (yellow card) 85'	Report	Reason 16'; Drury 35'; Wilson (yellow card) 56'; Mandron 74' (pen.)	Stadium: County Ground; Attendance: 4,321; Referee: Chris Sarginson

=== EFL Cup ===
9 August 2016 First round	Queens Park Rangers	2–2 (a.e.t.) (4–2 p)	Swindon Town	White City, London
19:45 BST (UTC+1)	Perch 57'; Ngbakoto 58'; Henry (yellow card) 90+2'; Washington 93'; Polter (yellow card) 103'	Report	Sendles-White (yellow card) 23'; Stewart 72' (yellow card) 112'; Barry (yellow card) 90+2'; Brophy 107'	Stadium: Loftus Road
	Penalties
	Chery (penalty scored); Polter (penalty scored); Washington (penalty scored); El Khayati (penalty scored)		Rodgers (penalty missed); Thomas (penalty scored); Stewart (penalty scored); Barry (penalty missed)

=== EFL Trophy ===
==== Group stage ====
Pos	Div	Team	Pld	W	PW	PL	L	GF	GA	GD	Pts	Qualification
1	L1	Swindon Town	3	1	2	0	0	3	2	+1	7	Advance to Round 2
2	L1	Oxford United	3	1	0	2	0	5	3	+2	5	Advance to Round 2
3	L2	Exeter City	3	1	0	1	1	6	7	−1	4	
4	ACA	Chelsea U21	3	0	1	0	2	4	6	−2	2	

Source: Sky Sports

13 September 2016 1	Swindon Town	2–1	Chelsea U23	County Ground
19:45	Branco 18'; Delfouneso 60' (yellow card) 86'; Iandolo (yellow card) 90'		Ali 80'; Collins (yellow card) 82'	Attendance: 1,961

4 October 2016 2	Swindon Town	0–0 (3–1 p)	Oxford United	County Ground
19:45 BST	Iandolo (yellow card) 18'; Thomas (yellow card) 39'; Goddard (yellow card) 90+3'	Report	Edwards (yellow card) 24'; MacDonald (red card) 37'; Rothwell (yellow card) 40'; Skarz (yellow card) 48'; Crowley (yellow card) 68'	Attendance: 2,698; Referee: Paul Tierney
	Penalties
	Goddard (penalty scored); Murray (penalty missed); Norris (penalty missed); Thomas (penalty scored); Furlong (penalty scored)		Sercombe (penalty missed); Taylor (penalty scored); Thomas (penalty missed); Ruffels (penalty missed)

8 November 2016 3	Exeter City	1–1 (2–4 p)	Swindon Town	Exeter
19:45	Wheeler 59'; Simpson (yellow card) 77'	Report	Smith (yellow card) 27'; Norris 30'; Jones (yellow card) 79'	Stadium: St James Park; Attendance: 729; Referee: Brett Huxtable
	Penalties
	James (penalty missed); Simpson (penalty scored); Grant (penalty scored); Holmes (penalty missed)		Doughty (penalty scored); Evans (penalty scored); Raphael Branco (penalty scored); Yaser Kasim (penalty scored)

==== Knockout phase ====
6 December 2016 Second round	Swindon Town	2–3	Luton Town	Swindon
19:45 GMT	Norris 6'; Iandolo 62'	Report	McQuoid 9', 19', (yellow card) 73'; Vassell 69'	Stadium: County Ground; Attendance: 1,692; Referee: Roger East

== Statistics ==
=== Appearances ===
No.	Pos.	Name	League One		FA Cup		EFL Cup		EFL Trophy		Total		Discipline	
No.	Pos.	Name	Apps	Goals	Apps	Goals	Apps	Goals	Apps	Goals	Apps	Goals	Yellow card	Red card
1	GK	(Chile) Lawrence Vigouroux	43	0	2	0	1	0	0	0	46	0	3	2
2	DF	(England) Nathan Thompson	34	2	1	0	1	0	0	0	36	2	10	0
3	DF	(England) Brandon Ormonde-Ottewill	18 (3)	1	2	0	0	0	3	0	23 (3)	1	3	1
4	MF	(England) Conor Thomas	29 (4)	1	1	0	1	0	2	0	33 (4)	1	7	0
5	MF	(Republic of Ireland) Anton Rodgers	19 (3)	1	0 (1)	0	1	0	3	0	23 (4)	1	3	0
6	DF	(Northern Ireland) Jamie Sendles-White	5	0	0	0	1	0	1	0	7	0	3	0
7	MF	(England) Ben Gladwin	15 (3)	2	0	0	0	0	0	0	15 (3)	2	6	0
8	MF	(Iraq) Yaser Kasim	18 (2)	2	2	0	1	0	0 (1)	0	21 (3)	2	7	0
9	FW	(England) Jonathan Obika	27 (3)	6	0	0	0	0	0 (1)	0	27 (4)	6	0	0
10	MF	(England) John Goddard	28 (14)	3	1 (1)	0	0	0	3 (1)	0	32 (16)	3	3	0
11	DF	(England) James Brophy	22 (8)	0	0	0	1	1	2	0	25 (8)	1	3	1
12	GK	(England) Will Henry	3	0	0	0	0	0	4	0	7	0	0	0
14	MF	(England) Ellis Iandolo	5 (5)	0	0	0	0 (1)	0	2 (2)	1	7 (8)	1	3	0
16	MF	(Northern Ireland) Jordan Stewart	0 (7)	0	0 (1)	0	0 (1)	1	0	0	0 (9)	1	3	0
17	FW	(Scotland) Islam Feruz	4	0	0	0	0	0	0	0	4	0	0	0
19	FW	(England) Nicky Ajose	15	5	0	0	0	0	0	0	15	5	0	0
20	MF	(England) Charlie Colkett	19	1	0	0	0	0	0	0	19	1	4	0
21	DF	(England) Fankaty Dabo	15	1	0	0	0	0	0	0	15	1	3	0
22	MF	(England) Jesse Starkey	1	0	0	0	0	0	0	0	1	0	1	0
23	MF	(England) Rohan Ince	14	2	0	0	0	0	0	0	14	2	3	0
24	FW	(England) Jermaine Hylton	4 (8)	0	0	0	1	0	1 (1)	0	6 (9)	0	0	0
25	DF	(England) Dion Conroy	11 (3)	0	0	0	0	0	0	0	11 (3)	0	3	0
27	DF	(England) Bradley Barry	17 (6)	1	1	0	1	0	1	0	20 (6)	1	7	1
28	DF	(England) Lloyd Jones	23 (1)	2	2	0	1	0	2	0	28 (1)	2	6	1
29	DF	(Brazil) Raphael Rossi Branco	34	2	2	0	0	0	3	1	39	3	13	0
30	MF	(Australia) James Georgaklis	0	0	0	0	0	0	0	0	0	0	0	0
32	MF	(England) Tom Ouldridge	0	0	0	0	0	0	0	0	0	0	0	0
33	FW	(England) Luke Norris	18 (21)	4	2	0	1	0	4	2	25 (21)	6	2	0
34	MF	(Scotland) Callum Gunner	0	0	0	0	0	0	0	0	0	0	0	0
35	MF	(Scotland) Jordan Young	1 (1)	0	0	0	0	0	0 (1)	0	1 (2)	0	0	0
36	FW	(England) Scott Twine	0 (1)	0	0	0	0	0	0	0	0 (1)	0	0	0
37	DF	(England) Louis Spalding	0	0	0	0	0	0	0	0	0	0	0	0
39	MF	(England) Jordan Simpson	0	0	0	0	0	0	0	0	0	0	0	0
Players who left the club in August/January transfer window or on loan
15	MF	(England) Tom Smith	4 (4)	0	0	0	0 (1)	0	3	0	7 (5)	0	1	0
18	MF	(England) Jake Evans	0 (1)	0	0	0	0	0	1 (1)	0	1 (2)	0	0	0
—	DF	(England) Darnell Furlong	21 (3)	2	1	0	0	0	3	0	25 (3)	2	6	0
—	DF	(Northern Ireland) Rhys Sharpe	0	0	0	0	0	0	1	0	1	0	0	0
—	MF	(Wales) Michael Doughty	13 (1)	2	2	1	0	0	0 (1)	0	15 (2)	3	1	0
—	MF	(Republic of Ireland) Sean Murray	13 (5)	1	2	0	0	0	2 (1)	0	17 (6)	1	0	0
—	FW	(England) Nathan Delfouneso	13 (5)	1	1 (1)	1	0	0	3 (1)	1	17 (7)	3	3	0

Last updated: 30 April 2017.
Source: Swindon Town F.C.

=== Top scorers ===
The list is sorted by shirt number when total goals are equal.

Rnk	Pos	No.	Player	League One	FA Cup	EFL Cup	EFL Trophy	Total
1	FW	9	(England) Jonathan Obika	6	0	0	0	6
1	FW	33	(England) Luke Norris	4	0	0	2	6
3	FW	19	(England) Nicky Ajose	5	0	0	0	5
4	MF	10	(England) John Goddard	3	0	0	0	3
4	DF	29	(Brazil) Raphael Rossi Branco	2	0	0	1	3
4	MF	—	(Wales) Michael Doughty	2	1	0	0	3
4	FW	—	(England) Nathan Delfouneso	1	1	0	1	3
8	DF	2	(England) Nathan Thompson	2	0	0	0	2
8	MF	7	(England) Ben Gladwin	2	0	0	0	2
8	MF	8	(Iraq) Yaser Kasim	2	0	0	0	2
8	MF	23	(England) Rohan Ince	2	0	0	0	2
8	DF	28	(England) Lloyd Jones	2	0	0	0	2
8	DF	—	(England) Darnell Furlong	2	0	0	0	2
13	DF	3	(England) Brandon Ormonde-Ottewill	1	0	0	0	1
13	MF	4	(England) Conor Thomas	1	0	0	0	1
13	MF	5	(Republic of Ireland) Anton Rodgers	1	0	0	0	1
13	DF	11	(England) James Brophy	0	0	1	0	1
13	MF	14	(England) Ellis Iandolo	0	0	0	1	1
13	MF	16	(Northern Ireland) Jordan Stewart	0	0	1	0	1
13	MF	20	(England) Charlie Colkett	1	0	0	0	1
13	DF	21	(England) Fankaty Dabo	1	0	0	0	1
13	DF	27	(England) Bradley Barry	1	0	0	0	1
13	MF	—	(Republic of Ireland) Sean Murray	1	0	0	0	1
Own goals				2	0	0	0	2
Total				44	2	2	5	53

Last updated: 22 April 2017.
Source: Swindon Town F.C.

=== Clean sheets ===
The list is sorted by shirt number when total appearances are equal.

Rnk	No.	Player	League One	FA Cup	EFL Cup	EFL Trophy	Total
1	1	(Chile) Lawrence Vigouroux	12	0	0	0	12
2	12	(England) Will Henry	0	0	0	1	1
Total			12	0	0	1	13

Last updated: 14 April 2017.
Source: Swindon Town F.C.

=== Summary ===
Games played	53 (46 League One) (2 FA Cup) (1 EFL Cup) (4 EFL Trophy)
Games won	12 (11 League Two) (1 EFL Trophy)
Games drawn	15 (11 League One) (1 FA Cup) (1 EFL Cup) (2 EFL Trophy)
Games lost	26 (24 League One) (1 FA Cup) (1 EFL Trophy)
Goals scored	53 (44 League One) (2 FA Cup) (2 EFL Cup) (5 EFL Trophy)
Goals conceded	77 (66 League One) (4 FA Cup) (2 EFL Cup) (5 EFL Trophy)
Goal difference	–24 (–22 League One) (–2 FA Cup) (+0 EFL Cup) (+0 EFL Trophy)
Clean sheets	13 (12 League One) (1 EFL Trophy)
Yellow cards	109 (97 League One) (2 FA Cup) (3 EFL Cup) (7 EFL Trophy)
Red cards	6 (6 League One)
Most appearances	(England) John Goddard (48 Appearances)
Top scorer	(England) Jonathan Obika (6 goals) (England) Luke Norris (6 goals)
Winning Percentage	Overall: 12/53 (22.64%)

Last updated: 30 April 2017.
Source: Swindon Town F.C.
