= Bradley Barry =

English footballer (born 1995)

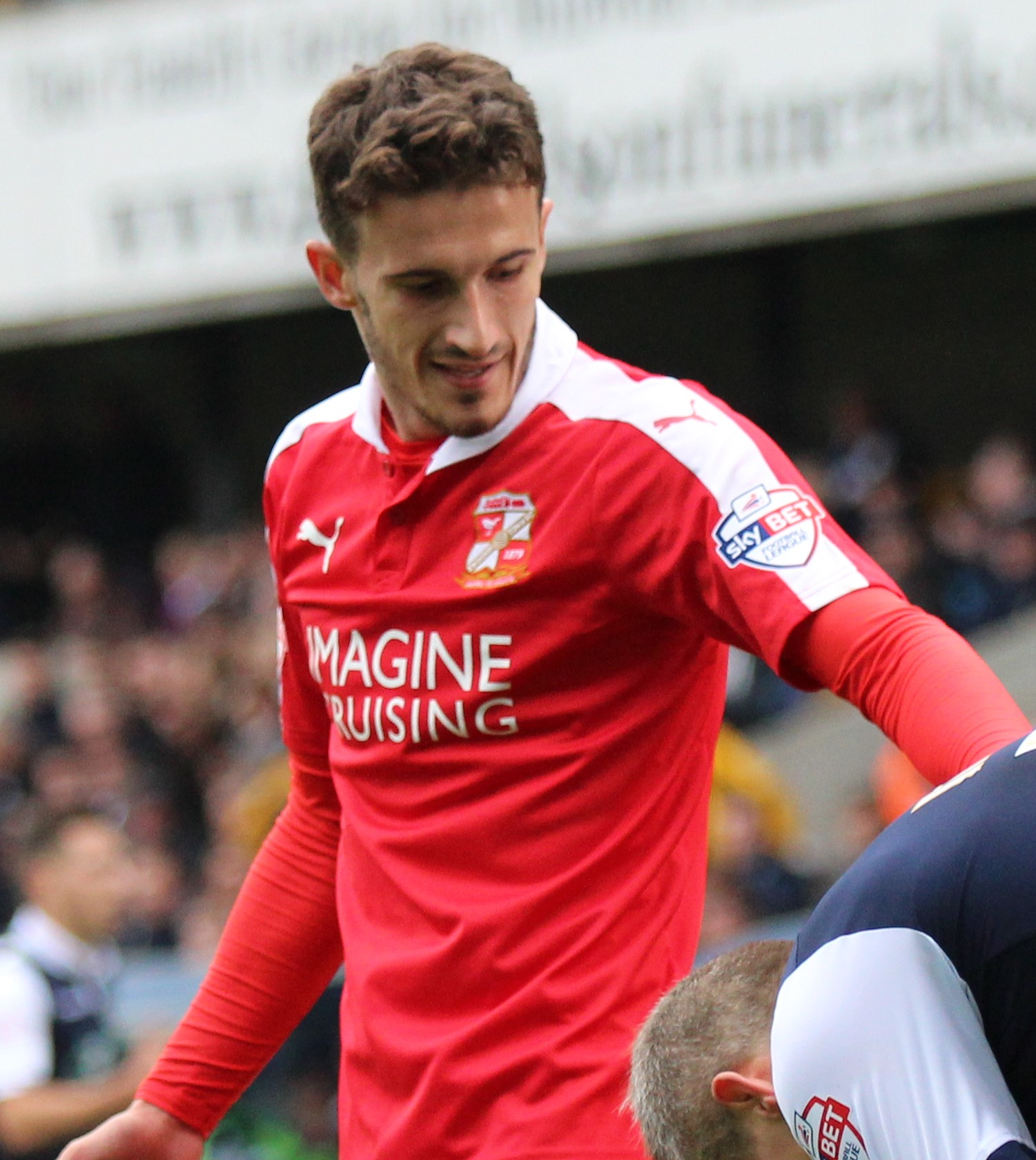
- Barry with Swindon Town in 2015

Personal information
- Full name: Bradley Oliver Barry
- Date of birth: 13 February 1995 (age 31)
- Place of birth: Hastings, England
- Height: 6 ft 0 in (1.83 m)
- Positions: Midfielder; centre-back

Team information
- Current team: Burgess Hill Town

Youth career
- 2011–2015: Brighton & Hove Albion

Senior career*
Years	Team	Apps	(Gls)
2015–2017	Swindon Town	58	(1)
2017–2019	Chesterfield	51	(2)
2018	→ Dover Athletic (loan)	3	(0)
2019–2021	Barrow	63	(2)
2021–2022	Stevenage	12	(0)
2022–2025	Eastbourne Borough	75	(0)
2025–2026	Hastings United	17	(1)
2026–	Burgess Hill Town	0	(0)

Managerial career
- 2024: Eastbourne Borough (caretaker)
- * Club domestic league appearances and goals as of 12:29, 29 May 2026 (UTC)

Bradley Oliver Barry (born 13 February 1995) is an English professional footballer who plays as a midfielder or defender for Isthmian League Premier Division club Burgess Hill Town.

== Club career ==
=== Early career ===
Barry started his career within the youth ranks at Brighton & Hove Albion before signing a development contract with them in 2013. However, Barry suffered a leg injury that kept him sidelined for 11 months. After recovering from his leg injury, Barry returned to development squad and played his first match, as well as captain, against Blackburn Rovers U21 on 18 August 2014.

Barry was released by 'the Seagulls' in the summer of 2015 without making a single appearance for the senior side.

=== Swindon Town ===
Preceding his release from Brighton, Barry joined League One side Swindon Town on a one-year deal following a successful trial.

On 1 September 2015, Barry went onto make his Swindon debut in their Football League Trophy victory over Newport County, featuring for the full 90 minutes. Four days later, Barry made his league debut for the club in their 3–1 away victory against Crewe Alexandra, once again featuring for the entire 90 minutes. Despite suffering setback of injuries, Barry went onto make thirty-four more league starts for Swindon before signing a new one-year deal alongside teammate Ellis Iandolo in July 2016.

In the 2016–17 season, on 20 August 2016, Barry scored his first goal for Swindon, netting the winner in their 1–0 victory over Port Vale in the 47th minute. However, Barry's first team opportunities was soon limited with injuries and suspension, which has affected his season. Despite this, Barry went on to make twenty-six appearances and scoring once in all competitions.

On 2 May 2017, it was announced that Barry would leave Swindon upon the expiry of his contract in June 2017.

=== Chesterfield ===
On 18 May 2017, Barry signed a two-year deal with Chesterfield. He was loaned out to Dover Athletic in September 2018. After missing six games for Dover and amidst an injury crisis at Chesterfield, he was recalled early in November.

Barry left the club in May 2019, at the expiry of his contract.

=== Barrow ===
Shortly after his exit from Chesterfield, Barry signed a two-year deal at Barrow, also in the National League. In his first season he formed part of the side that won promotion to League Two.

=== Stevenage ===
Barry signed for fellow League Two club Stevenage on 8 July 2021.

=== Non-League ===
In June 2025, Barry joined hometown club Hastings United following their relegation to the Isthmian League South East Division.

In May 2026, he joined Isthmian League Premier Division side Burgess Hill Town.

== Personal life ==
Barry is the nephew of former Aston Villa, Manchester City and England international, Gareth Barry.

== Career statistics ==
As of end of 2025–26 season

Club	Season	League			FA Cup		EFL Cup		Other		Total	
Club	Season	Division	Apps	Goals	Apps	Goals	Apps	Goals	Apps	Goals	Apps	Goals
Swindon Town	2015–16	League One	35	0	1	0	0	0	2 (Note: Appearance(s) in Football League Trophy)	0	38	0
Swindon Town	2016–17	League One	23	1	1	0	1	0	1 (Note: Appearance(s) in EFL Trophy)	0	26	1
Swindon Town	Total		58	1	2	0	1	0	3	0	64	1
Chesterfield	2017–18	League Two	29	0	1	0	1	0	3	0	34	0
Chesterfield	2018–19	National League	22	2	1	0	0	0	1 (Note: Appearance(s) in FA Trophy)	0	24	2
Chesterfield	Total		51	2	2	0	1	0	4	0	58	2
Dover Athletic (loan)	2018–19	National League	3	0	0	0	—		0	0	3	0
Barrow	2019–20	National League	30	1	1	0	—		1	1	32	2
Barrow	2020–21	League Two	33	1	0	0	0	0	1	0	34	1
Barrow	Total		63	2	1	0	0	0	2	1	66	3
Stevenage	2021–22	League Two	12	0	2	1	0	0	3	0	17	1
Eastbourne Borough	2022–23	National League South	32	0	3	0	—		1	0	36	0
Eastbourne Borough	2023–24	National League South	27	0	0	0	—		0	0	27	0
Eastbourne Borough	2024–25	National League South	16	0	0	0	—		3 (Note: One appearance in National League South play-offs, one appearance in FA Trophy, one appearance in Sussex Senior Cup)	0	19	0
Eastbourne Borough	Total		75	0	3	0	0	0	4	0	82	0
Hastings United	2025–26	Isthmian League South East Division	17	1	0	0	—		1	0	18	1
Career total			279	6	10	1	2	0	17	1	308	8
