= Raphael Rossi =

Brazilian footballer

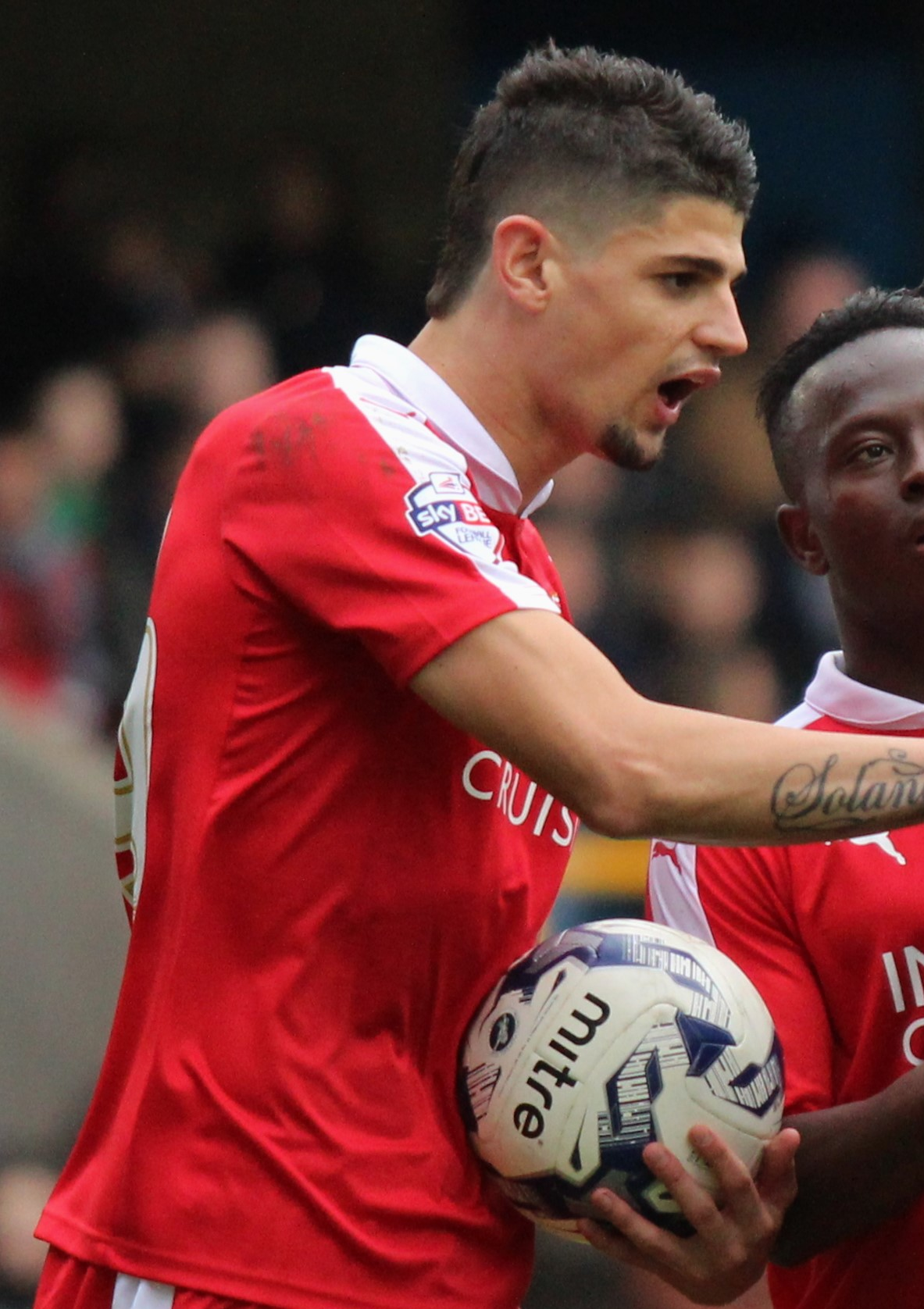
- Rossi with Swindon Town in 2015

Personal information
- Full name: Raphael Rossi Branco
- Date of birth: 25 July 1990 (age 36)
- Place of birth: Campinas, Brazil
- Height: 6 ft 2 in (1.88 m)
- Position: Centre-back

Team information
- Current team: Mafra
- Number: 29

Youth career
- 2000–2005: Guarani
- 2006: Paulínia
- 2007–2008: Corinthians
- 2008: Cruzeiro
- 2009: Vitória

Senior career*
Years	Team	Apps	(Gls)
2010–2011	Porto Alegre	10	(2)
2011–2012	Brighton & Hove Albion	0	(0)
2012–2013	Whitehawk	29	(3)
2013–2017	Swindon Town	115	(6)
2017–2018	Boavista	30	(3)
2018–2021	Sion	10	(1)
2021	→ Radomiak Radom (loan)	16	(1)
2021–2025	Radomiak Radom	109	(5)
2025–	Mafra	24	(0)
- * Club domestic league appearances and goals as of 7 May 2026

Raphael Rossi Branco (born 25 July 1990), sometimes known as Raphael or Raphael Rossi, is a Brazilian professional footballer who plays as a centre-back for Liga 3 club Mafra.

He began his career with Porto Alegre and moved to Europe in 2011 to join Brighton & Hove Albion, and then nearby Whitehawk, where he won the 2012–13 Isthmian League. He then signed for Swindon Town, playing 131 official matches and scoring seven goals for the League One club before joining Boavista in 2017 and Sion a year later. In 2021, he moved to Polish club Radomiak Radom where he remained until January 2025. Shortly after, he returned to Portugal to join Mafra.

== Club career ==
=== Early career ===
Born in Campinas, São Paulo, Rossi debuted professionally for Porto Alegre and was spotted by an agent who was friend of Gus Poyet, then Brighton & Hove Albion manager. He went on a trial for the English club and an offer to sign for the team was stalled until the player could get an Italian passport. After that, Brighton demanded a statement from Branco's former youth clubs in which they would not receive future compensation, otherwise the club would have to pay £200,000 to register him, which meant he would be released.

After unsuccessful trials in Europe and Brazil, he went to play again in England for Brighton-based club Whitehawk. Since he was signing for a non-professional club, he did not need any agreement with his former clubs and could move to other clubs for free. With Whitehawk, Rossi won the 2012–13 Isthmian League.

=== Swindon Town ===
On 2 August 2013, he joined Swindon Town on a one-year deal after impressing on a pre-season trip to Portugal after being invited by a former Brighton & Hove Albion assistant. He was first called up for a matchday squad on 31 August, remaining unused as Swindon won 5–0 at the County Ground in a League One game against Crewe Alexandra. He made his debut on 8 October in the second round of the Football League Trophy, playing the entirety of a 2–1 victory over League Two team Plymouth Argyle. On 29 December he made his first league appearance, replacing the injured Grant Hall in the 53rd minute of a 1–1 draw away to Bradford City. He was given his first league start on 14 January 2014, playing the full 90 minutes of a 0–2 loss away to Stevenage. In total he played 18 matches over his first season, 15 of which were in the league.

He signed a new one-year contract on 30 June 2014. On 30 August, he scored the first goal of his professional career, heading from Nathan Byrne's cross to equalise in a 1–1 home league draw against Coventry City. In December, having previously been told that he had played his last game, he signed a further contract. Rossi scored again on 7 February 2015, opening the scoring from John Swift's pass in a 2–0 home win over Barnsley which put Swindon into second place in League One. He scored the only goal on 14 March to win away at Port Vale, heading in Harry Toffolo's corner in the eighth minute. Rossi was an unused substitute on 24 May as Swindon lost 0–4 to Preston North End in the play-off final at Wembley Stadium.

Swindon were relegated in Rossi's final season, 2016–17. On 8 October 2016, he was sent off for elbowing Lawrie Wilson in a 1–0 home loss to Bolton Wanderers.

=== Boavista ===
On 16 June 2017, Rossi signed a two-year deal with Primeira Liga club Boavista. He made his debut on 20 August in a 1–0 loss at Marítimo, and scored his first goal for them a week later, the game's only in a home victory against Aves.

=== FC Sion ===
In June 2018, Rossi signed a three-year deal with Swiss club FC Sion.

==== Loan to Radomiak Radom ====
On 1 February 2021, Rossi moved to I liga club Radomiak Radom, on a loan deal until the end of the season.

=== Radomiak Radom ===
In July 2021, Rossi signed a permanent contract with Radomiak Radom having completed a successful loan spell. On 11 January 2025, he left the club by mutual consent.

=== Mafra ===
Two days later, Rossi joined Liga Portugal 2 club Mafra.

== Playing style ==
In addition to central defence, Rossi can play at right-back and midfield. His favourite player is compatriot defender David Luiz.

== Personal life ==
His older brother Igor, also a defender, plays for Al-Faisaly in the Saudi Professional League.

== Career statistics ==
As of match played 14 December 2024

Appearances and goals by club, season and competition
Club	Season	League			National cup (Note: Includes FA Cup, Taça de Portugal, Swiss Cup, Polish Cup)		League cup (Note: Includes EFL Cup, Taça da Liga)		Continental		Other		Total	
Club	Season	Division	Apps	Goals	Apps	Goals	Apps	Goals	Apps	Goals	Apps	Goals	Apps	Goals
Porto Alegre	2010	Campeonato Gaúcho	10	2	—		—		—		—		10	2
Brighton & Hove Albion	2011–12	EFL Championship	0	0	0	0	0	0	0	0	0	0	0	0
Whitehawk	2012–13	Isthmian League	29	3	—		—		—		—		29	3
Swindon Town	2013–14	EFL League One	15	0	0	0	0	0	—		3 (Note: Appearances in EFL Trophy)	0	18	0
Swindon Town	2014–15	EFL League One	30	3	1	0	2	0	—		0	0	33	3
Swindon Town	2015–16	EFL League One	36	1	1	0	1	0	—		2	0	40	1
Swindon Town	2016–17	EFL League One	34	2	2	0	0	0	—		3	1	39	3
Swindon Town	Total		115	6	4	0	3	0	—		8	1	130	7
Boavista	2017–18	Primeira Liga	30	3	1	0	1	0	—		—		32	3
Sion	2018–19	Swiss Super League	10	1	2	0	—		—		—		12	1
Radomiak Radom (loan)	2020–21	I liga	16	1	1	0	—		—		—		17	1
Radomiak Radom	2021–22	Ekstraklasa	32	2	0	0	—		—		—		32	2
Radomiak Radom	2022–23	Ekstraklasa	30	2	2	0	—		—		—		32	2
Radomiak Radom	2023–24	Ekstraklasa	30	1	0	0	—		—		—		30	1
Radomiak Radom	2024–25	Ekstraklasa	17	0	1	0	—		—		—		18	0
Radomiak Radom	Total		125	6	4	0	0	0	0	0	0	0	129	6
Career total			319	21	11	0	4	0	0	0	8	1	342	22

== Honours ==
Whitehawk

- Isthmian League: 2012–13

Radomiak Radom

- I liga: 2020–21
