= John Goddard (footballer) =

English association football player

Personal information
- Full name: John Robert Goddard
- Date of birth: 2 June 1993 (age 33)
- Place of birth: Sandhurst, England
- Height: 5 ft 10 in (1.78 m)
- Positions: Attacking midfielder; winger

Team information
- Current team: Slough Town
- Number: 10

Youth career
- 2001–2012: Reading

Senior career*
Years	Team	Apps	(Gls)
2012–2013	Hayes & Yeading United	35	(0)
2013–2016	Woking	116	(25)
2016–2018	Swindon Town	55	(4)
2018–2019	Stevenage	11	(0)
2018–2019	→ Bromley (loan)	14	(1)
2019	Aldershot Town	18	(1)
2019–2020	Ebbsfleet United	21	(1)
2020–2021	Woking	7	(0)
2021–2022	St Albans City	36	(7)
2022–2024	Slough Town	84	(22)
2024	Boreham Wood	7	(0)
2024–	Slough Town	75	(10)

International career^{‡}
2016–2024	England C	3	(0)

Managerial career
- 2026: Slough Town (joint-interim)
- * Club domestic league appearances and goals as of 10:31, 5 November 2026 (UTC) ‡ National team caps and goals as of 21:58, 6 May 2024 (UTC)

John Robert Goddard (born 2 June 1993) is an English professional footballer who plays as an attacking midfielder or winger for National League South club Slough Town.

Goddard began his career at Reading, signing his first professional contract in 2011 before being released a year later. He spent the 2012–13 season with Conference South club Hayes & Yeading United before joining Woking in September 2013, where he scored 31 goals in 139 appearances across three seasons. He returned to the Football League with Swindon Town in May 2016, later moving to Stevenage in January 2018.

After a loan spell with Bromley, Goddard signed for Aldershot Town in January 2019. He joined Ebbsfleet United in July 2019, before returning to Woking in August 2020, where he spent the 2020–21 season. He spent the following season at National League South club St Albans City, then moved to divisional rivals Slough Town in July 2022. After a brief spell with Boreham Wood at the start of the 2024–25 season, he returned to Slough in November 2024 as a player-coach. Goddard has also earned three caps for the England C team.

== Early life ==
Goddard was born in Sandhurst, Berkshire.

== Club career ==
=== Early career ===
Goddard joined Reading at the age of eight in 2001 and progressed through the club's youth academy, signing his first professional contract in 2011. He featured primarily for the development squad during the 2011–12 season and did not make a first-team appearance. Following Reading's promotion to the Premier League, he was released at the end of his contract on 30 June 2012.

Ahead of the 2012–13 season, Goddard signed a one-year contract with Conference South club Hayes & Yeading United. He made his senior debut in a 1–1 draw against Weston-super-Mare, playing 70 minutes. He scored once that season, in a 4–1 FA Trophy victory over Eastleigh, and made 40 appearances in all competitions as the club finished 17th in the league.

=== Woking ===
Following a trial with Woking in July 2013, during which he scored twice in a pre-season friendly against Staines Town, Goddard signed for the Conference Premier club on 1 September 2013. He made his debut in a 2–0 victory over Hyde United on 17 September 2013 and scored his first goal in a 2–0 win at Gateshead on 15 February 2014. He finished his first season with four goals in 42 appearances. Goddard signed a one-year contract extension on 5 May 2014 and went on to score seven times in 47 appearances during the 2014–15 season, including the first brace (two goals in a match) of his career in a 3–1 victory at Dartford in March 2015, Woking ended the season in seventh, narrowly missing out on the play-offs.

The 2015–16 season served as Goddard's breakthrough season in terms of regular goal contributions. He scored twice in a 2–0 victory over Bromley at Kingfield Stadium on 11 August 2015, and went on to record seven goals in nine matches, including a brace in a 4–4 draw away at Guiseley and the match-winner in a 2–1 win against unbeaten league leaders Forest Green Rovers. He finished the season with 20 goals in 50 appearances from midfield and was named Woking's Player of the Year.

=== Swindon Town ===
Two weeks after the conclusion of the season, on 13 May 2016, Goddard signed for League One club Swindon Town on a three-year contract and for an undisclosed fee, with the club stating they had beaten competition from Championship and rival League One clubs for his signature. He made his debut on the opening day of the 2016–17 season, playing the full 90 minutes in a 1–0 victory against Coventry City. Goddard scored his first goal for Swindon in a 1–1 draw away at Shrewsbury Town on 1 October 2016, and added two further goals that season. He made 48 appearances in all competitions, the most of any Swindon player that season, as the club were relegated to League Two.

Goddard sustained a foot injury in Swindon's opening-day victory at Carlisle United on 5 August 2017, which sidelined him for six weeks. He scored his first goal of the season in a 3–1 away victory over Mansfield Town on 14 October 2017. However, he struggled to hold down a regular starting place, with 10 of his 17 appearances that season coming as a substitute, and he did not feature during the final six weeks at Swindon before leaving the club. Goddard made 65 appearances in all competitions during his time there, scoring five goals.

=== Stevenage and Aldershot Town ===
Goddard signed for League Two club Stevenage on 31 January 2018, joining on a 2 1/2-year contract for an undisclosed fee. He made his debut three days later in a 3–2 away defeat at Accrington Stanley. After the appointment of manager Dino Maamria, Goddard fell out of favour and made three further appearances before being transfer-listed at the end of the season. He joined National League club Bromley on loan on 17 August 2018, in a deal until January 2019. He debuted the following day in Bromley's first win of the season, a 1–0 home victory over Gateshead, and scored once in 16 appearances during the loan spell, in a 3–1 defeat to Leyton Orient on 17 November 2018.

After his loan at Bromley ended, Goddard signed for fellow National League club Aldershot Town on a six-month contract on 18 January 2019. He made his debut the following day, playing the whole match in a 2–0 home defeat to Chesterfield. Goddard scored once during his time at the club, in a 2–0 away victory against Boreham Wood on 23 March 2019, and made 18 appearances as Aldershot finished 21st in the National League.

=== Ebbsfleet United and return to Woking ===
Goddard went on trial with National League club Ebbsfleet United in pre-season ahead of the 2019–20 season and signed a one-year contract on 16 July 2019. The move reunited him with manager Garry Hill, under whom he had played at Woking. He scored on his debut in a 4–1 home defeat to FC Halifax Town on 3 August 2019, and went on to make 23 appearances in all competitions, scoring once, before the National League season was curtailed due to the COVID-19 pandemic in March 2020. Goddard left the club following the expiry of his contract in July 2020.

Goddard returned to Woking on 13 August 2020, signing a one-year contract. He made his first appearance back at Woking as a substitute in a 2–1 victory against Solihull Moors on 3 October 2020. He made nine appearances during the 2020–21 season before leaving when his contract expired in June 2021.

=== Further spells in non-League ===
Goddard joined National League South club St Albans City on 8 August 2021 following a short-term trial. He made his debut on the opening day of the 2021–22 season in a 3–1 home defeat to Dartford, and scored his first goal on 30 October 2021 in a 2–1 comeback victory over Eastbourne Borough. Goddard made 46 appearances, scoring seven goals, as St Albans finished ninth in the National League South. He left the club upon the expiry of his contract in June 2022, in order to reduce travel and pursue football closer to home while focusing on his business interests.

He joined fellow National League South club Slough Town on 21 June 2022. Goddard scored his first goals for the club in a 3–1 victory over Cheshunt on 27 August 2022, and finished the 2022–23 season as Slough's top goalscorer with six goals in 44 appearances. He remained with the club for the 2023–24 season, earning the National League South Player of the Month award for November 2023 after scoring four goals, including two free kicks, in six matches. He ended the season as Slough's top goalscorer for a second consecutive year with 19 goals in 52 appearances and was also named the club's Player of the Year.

Following the expiry of his contract at Slough, Goddard joined divisional rivals Boreham Wood on 24 May 2024, having previously played alongside assistant manager Mark Ricketts at Woking. After making eight appearances with limited playing time, he returned to Slough on 9 November 2024 as a player-coach, after the club had approached Boreham Wood several times and the transfer was sanctioned. He scored three times in 27 appearances during the remainder of 2024–25 season and signed a one-year contract extension on 27 May 2025. During the 2025–26 season, he scored five goals in 45 appearances as Slough finished 16th in the National League South. He signed a further one-year contract extension on 7 May 2026.

== International career ==
Goddard received his first call-up to the England C team, who represent England at non-League level, from manager Paul Fairclough on 4 March 2016, ahead of a fixture against Ukraine under-20s on 22 March 2016. He made his debut in a 2–0 victory, playing the full 90 minutes and contributing to the opening goal. He earned a second call-up for the England C fixture against Slovakia under-21s on 18 May 2016, again playing the entire match in a 4–3 defeat.

Following the 2023–24 season, Goddard was recalled to the England C squad and made his third appearance in a 2–0 win over Nepal on 6 May 2024.

== Style of play ==
Goddard has been deployed as an attacking midfielder and as a winger on both the left and right wings.

== Coaching career ==
Goddard holds a UEFA A Licence and FA coaching qualifications. In 2013, he founded Core Football Coaching, a youth football academy based in Berkshire, where he serves as managing director. He later established Core Kids Club, which focuses on the development and welfare of children in sport.

Following the dismissal of Alan Julian on 6 September 2026, Goddard was appointed joint-interim manager of Slough Town, alongside Henry Ochieng and Ryan Case.

== Career statistics ==
As of match played 27 October 2026

Appearances and goals by club, season and competition
Club	Season	League			FA Cup		League Cup		Other		Total	
Club	Season	Division	Apps	Goals	Apps	Goals	Apps	Goals	Apps	Goals	Apps	Goals
Hayes & Yeading United	2012–13	Conference South	35	0	1	0	—		4 (Note: Three appearances in Middlesex Senior Cup; one appearance in FA Trophy)	1	40	1
Woking	2013–14	Conference Premier	34	3	1	0	—		7 (Note: Six appearances and one goal in Middlesex Senior Cup; one appearance in FA Trophy)	1	42	4
Woking	2014–15	Conference Premier	41	5	2	0	—		4 (Note: Three appearances in FA Trophy; one appearance in Middlesex Senior Cup)	2	47	7
Woking	2015–16	National League	41	17	1	0	—		8 (Note: Four appearances in FA Trophy; four appearances and three goals in Middlesex Senior Cup)	3	50	20
Woking	Total		116	25	4	0	0	0	19	6	139	31
Swindon Town	2016–17	League One	42	3	2	0	0	0	4 (Note: Appearance(s) in EFL Trophy)	0	48	3
Swindon Town	2017–18	League Two	13	1	2	0	0	0	2	1	17	2
Swindon Town	Total		55	4	4	0	0	0	6	1	65	5
Stevenage	2017–18	League Two	11	0	—		—		0	0	11	0
Stevenage	2018–19	League Two	0	0	0	0	0	0	0	0	0	0
Stevenage	Total		11	0	0	0	0	0	0	0	11	0
Bromley (loan)	2018–19	National League	14	1	2	0	—		0	0	16	1
Aldershot Town	2018–19	National League	18	1	—		—		0	0	18	1
Ebbsfleet United	2019–20	National League	21	1	0	0	—		2 (Note: Appearance(s) in FA Trophy)	0	23	1
Woking	2020–21	National League	7	0	1	0	—		1	0	9	0
St Albans City	2021–22	National League South	36	7	8	0	—		2	0	46	7
Slough Town	2022–23	National League South	41	6	1	0	—		1	0	43	6
Slough Town	2023–24	National League South	43	16	7	3	—		2	1	52	20
Slough Town	Total		84	22	8	3	0	0	3	1	95	26
Boreham Wood	2024–25	National League South	7	0	1	0	—		—		8	0
Slough Town	2024–25	National League South	25	3	—		—		2	0	27	3
Slough Town	2025–26	National League South	37	5	6	0	—		2 (Note: One appearance in FA Trophy; one appearance in Berks & Bucks Senior Cup)	0	45	5
Slough Town	2026–27	National League South	13	2	1	0	—		1 (Note: Appearance in Berks & Bucks Senior Cup)	0	15	2
Slough Town	Total		75	10	7	0	0	0	5	0	87	10
Career total			479	71	35	3	0	0	42	9	556	83

== Honours ==
Individual

- Woking Player of the Year: 2015–16
- Slough Town Player of the Year: 2023–24
- National League South Player of the Month: November 2023
