= Jesse Starkey =

English footballer

Personal information
- Full name: Jesse Aaron Starkey
- Date of birth: 1 September 1995 (age 31)
- Place of birth: Brighton, England
- Position: Midfielder

Team information
- Current team: Worthing

Youth career
- –2006: Portsmouth
- 2006–2013: Chelsea
- 2013–2017: Brighton & Hove Albion

Senior career*
Years	Team	Apps	(Gls)
2017	Swindon Town	1	(0)
2017–2018	Gillingham	1	(0)
2017–2018	→ Worthing (loan)	8	(0)
2018–	Worthing	127	(11)

International career^{‡}
2013	England U18	1	(0)
- * Club domestic league appearances and goals as of 10:59, 28 June 2024 (UTC) ‡ National team caps and goals as of 21:59, 16 January 2018 (UTC)

Jesse Aaron Starkey (born 1 September 1995) is an English professional footballer who plays as a midfielder for Worthing.

== Club career ==
After a spell with Portsmouth, Starkey joined Chelsea in 2006 and began his scholarship in 2012. Although Starkey was a regular for the under-18 side, Chelsea decided against offering the player a professional contract as Jesse Starkey opted not to remain at the club on 13 June. A couple of months later, Starkey joined his hometown club Championship side Brighton & Hove Albion, on a two-year deal.

After a four-year spell at Brighton, Starkey joined League One side Swindon Town on a one-and-a-half-year deal. On the final day of the 2016–17 campaign, Starkey made his Swindon debut in their 3–0 away defeat against Charlton Athletic. He was taken off after 69 minutes having been booked just after half-time. On 5 September 2017, it was announced that Starkey had left Swindon, following the termination of his contract.

He returned to League One in joining Gillingham on 15 September 2017. Just over a week later, he made his debut during Gillingham's 0–0 draw with Scunthorpe United, replacing Sean Clare at half-time. In November 2017, Starkey moved on loan to Worthing, of the Isthmian League Premier Division. He went onto feature eight times before returning to Gillingham in January 2018. Following his return, it was announced that Starkey would leave Gillingham following the expiration of his short-term contract.

On 27 January 2018, following his release from Gillingham, Starkey returned to Worthing.

== Career statistics ==
As of match played 9 April 2022.

Club	Season	League			FA Cup		EFL Cup		Other		Total	
Club	Season	Division	Apps	Goals	Apps	Goals	Apps	Goals	Apps	Goals	Apps	Goals
Swindon Town	2016–17	League One	1	0	0	0	0	0	0	0	1	0
Gillingham	2017–18	League One	1	0	0	0	0	0	0	0	1	0
Worthing (loan)	2017–18	Isthmian League Premier Division	8	0	—		—		—		8	0
Worthing	2017–18	Isthmian League Premier Division	17	1	—		—		—		17	1
Worthing	2018–19	Isthmian League Premier Division	35	4	2	0	—		5 (Note: Two appearances in the Alan Turvey Trophy, three in the FA Trophy)	0	42	4
Worthing	2019–20	Isthmian League Premier Division	29	3	4	0	—		1 (Note: Appearances in the FA Trophy)	0	34	3
Worthing	2020–21	Isthmian League Premier Division	3	0	1	1	—		1	0	5	1
Worthing	2021–22	Isthmian League Premier Division	34	3	2	0	—		3	0	39	3
Worthing	Total		118	11	9	1	—		10	0	137	12
Career total			128	11	9	1	0	0	10	0	147	12
