= Slough Town F.C. =

English football club

Coordinates: 51°31′11″N 0°35′17″W

Slough Town
- Full name: Slough Town Football Club
- Nickname: The Rebels
- Founded: 1889; 137 years ago
- Ground: Arbour Park, Slough
- Capacity: 2,000
- Chairman: Talal Al Ajmi
- Manager: Steve McKimm
- League: National League South
- 2025–26: National League South, 16th of 24
- Website: sloughtownfc.net
Home colours	Away colours

Slough Town Football Club is a semi-professional English football club based in Slough, Berkshire. Nicknamed "The Rebels", the team competes in the National League South, at the sixth tier of English football, following promotion from the Southern League at the end of the 2017–18 season.

== History ==
The club began on 10 September 1889 with a meeting in Chalvey 'to consider the advisability of amalgamating the different football clubs in Slough and Chalvey.' Present were members of the Chalvey, Slough Albion and Friendly Society clubs. It was unanimously agreed to amalgamate. A further meeting was held on the 17 September 1889 at the Dolphin Hotel 'with the view of starting definitely a new and stable organisation bearing the name of the town and district'.

There were between thirty and forty players present. Mr. Godsal was voted to the chair, Mr. D. P. Hanrahan was appointed secretary, and Mr. F. Parker captain and treasurer. The entrance fee and club colours were decided upon and it was determined the club should enter Uxbridge F.C.'s Henesey Cup competition. On 12 October it was announced that local benefactor Mr. Algernon Gilliat would be Slough's president and that he had donated two guineas to the new club.

The first recorded game of Slough and District F.C. (shortened to Slough F.C.) was on 19 October 1889, at home against Maidenhead North Town Excelsior resulting in a 6–0 win. On 2 November 1889 the first team played Cookham Dean at the Dolphin Ground winning the game 7–0. The second team played Eton St. John's in Slough's Church Meadow resulting in a 2–2 draw. On 16 November the club played Colnbrook at Poyle Park, winning the game 3–1. On Boxing day 1889 Slough played Marlow at the Dolphin Ground winning 1–0.

After receiving a bye in the first round of the Henesey Challenge Cup, Slough played Darfield F.C. in the second round. After a 1–1 draw in East Acton on 28 December 1889 they lost 1–0 in the replay at the Dolphin Ground on 11 January 1890. The Dolphin Ground became Slough's home ground replacing the declining Swifts club there.

Slough joined the new Southern Alliance league in the 1892–3 season alongside the likes of Tottenham Hotspur and Windsor & Eton. In the 1894–5 season the club entered the FA Cup for the first time. They played Marlow in the first qualifying round on 13 October 1894 at the Dolphin Ground, but were defeated 4–1. In the 1901–2 season Slough joined the inaugural Berks & Bucks Senior League. Their first game in the league was against Wycombe Wanderers at Loakes Park on 14 September 1901 resulting in a 2–0 defeat. In the 1905–6 season the club joined the Great Western Suburban League.

During this time, Slough developed its first major rivalry, with Windsor & Eton. The rivalry is still known today as the Thames River Derby and is played between Slough and Windsor & Eton (2023). In 1921, Slough attempted to join the Isthmian League but lost out to Wycombe Wanderers in the voting. Instead Slough chose to join the Spartan League.

In 1928, Slough's Dolphin Ground underwent development with a greyhound track being constructed around the football pitch. In March 1929, the ground was renamed the Dolphin Stadium. After the start of World War II in September 1939, the club was forced to vacate the stadium and began playing at Slough cricket ground. During the weekend of 7–8 October 1939, amateur clubs in the Berkshire & Buckinghamshire, including Slough, formed the Great Western Combination League. Slough played in the league in the 1939–40 season. In the 1940–41 to 1942–43 seasons, the club played in the Herts and Middlesex League. After having ground-shared with Maidenhead United in the 1941–42 and 1942–43 seasons, in July 1943 the club agreed to a merger with Slough Centre F.C. to return to a ground in their home town. The new club took the name Slough United F.C. and continued Slough Centre's membership of the Great Western Combination League for the 1943–44 season.

After the War, Slough United was reluctant to rejoin the Spartan League and led a breakaway movement to form a new league for the 1945–46 season, which became the Corinthian League. The club derived its nickname of "The Rebels" from that event. After the end of the 1946–47 season, the two clubs which had merged to form Slough United separated. The former Slough Centre F.C. returned to their original name, joining the Spartan League Division 1 (Western) on 3 July 1947 for the 1947–48 season. The former Slough F.C. club continued in the Corinthian League as Slough United at the start of the 1947–48 season, until changing their name to Slough Town F.C. in November 1947.

Slough Town won the Corinthian League in 1950–51 but, in 1964, the league folded and Slough, along with many other former Corinthian clubs, joined an expanded Athenian League. The Rebels were champions of that league on three occasions, with the third win earning promotion to the Isthmian League in 1973. During the 1980s, they were league champions on two occasions, the second of which brought promotion to the Football Conference. Slough lasted four seasons at that level, were relegated back to the Isthmian League, bounced back at the first attempt, and then played three more seasons of Conference football. In 1998, the consortium which had bought the club out of receivership seven years earlier decided that they were not prepared to pay for ground improvements required to remain in the Conference, and so the club was demoted back to the Isthmian League despite having finished in 8th place.

Further relegation to the Isthmian League Division One followed in 2000–01, but the club regained its Premier Division status in 2003–04 and remained there until the end of the 2006–07 season, when they finished bottom, having conceded over 120 goals. In the 2004–05 season, Slough knocked Walsall of Football League One out of the FA Cup. Highlights of the game were shown on Match of the Day although, because the team shared the Stag Meadow ground at the time, when introducing the rarely featured team the programme showed overhead shots of Windsor rather than Slough. Slough transferred to the Southern Football League Division One South & West for the 2007–08 season, and finished 21st out of 22 teams. Although initially relegated (for the second year running), they were one of the teams given a provisional reprieve after Halifax Town went into administration.

In the season of 2004–05, Slough Town beat Walsall to reach the 2nd round of the FA Cup, but they then lost to Yeading. Slough Town were also the Isthmian League Cup winners in 2004–05 after they beat Hampton & Richmond Borough 3–1 in the final, with two goals from Ian Hodges and one from Josias Carbon helping them secure the win and the silverware.

Over the next two seasons, and then playing in the Southern Football League Division One Midlands, Slough's performance continued to improve. In the 2009–10 season, Slough Town finish 5th in the table, qualifying the team for the promotion play-off matches. Having beaten second-placed Hitchin Town 2–1 in the play-off semi-final, Slough lost 4–0 to Chesham United in the final, meaning they had to remain in the same division for the 2010–11 season. Once again they finished 5th in the 2010–11 season, but lost to Hitchin Town in the play-off semi-final 4–1.

Having come close to promotion to the Premier Division in the previous few seasons, including two play-off final defeats, Slough parted company with manager Steve Bateman following the 2012–13 season after four years at the helm, the last of which saw them miss out on the play-offs by a solitary point. The club looked to take a new direction in 2013–14 and appointed Neil Baker and Jon Underwood, the management duo who had taken league rivals Godalming Town to the play-offs in the previous season. With Godalming forced to relocate to the South & West Division following their failure to win the play-offs, the majority of their squad decided to follow Baker and Underwood to Slough. In their very first season, the new management team steered the club to promotion via the play-offs. Slough claimed a 3–0 victory at Rugby Town in the semi-final before winning the play-off final against Kettering Town in front of 2,331 at Kettering's home of Latimer Park on 5 May 2014. Slough trailed 0–2 at half-time before staging a second half comeback. Two goals from Johnnie Dyer brought the Rebels level before James McClurg scored the goal that ultimately returned Slough Town to the third tier of non-league football after a number of years.

The 2017–18 season was one of their best for many years. In December, they reached the second round of the FA Cup against Rochdale at home. The game was televised by BT Sport and Slough lost 4–0. With records broken for points attained and goals scored they went on to finish 3rd in the league. Slough were in play off action again. After a home 3–1 win against Kettering Town, they played away to King's Lynn Town in the final. By virtue of an 89th-minute winner from Manny Williams, they won 2–1 and thus secured promotion to the National League South for the forthcoming season.

== Ground ==
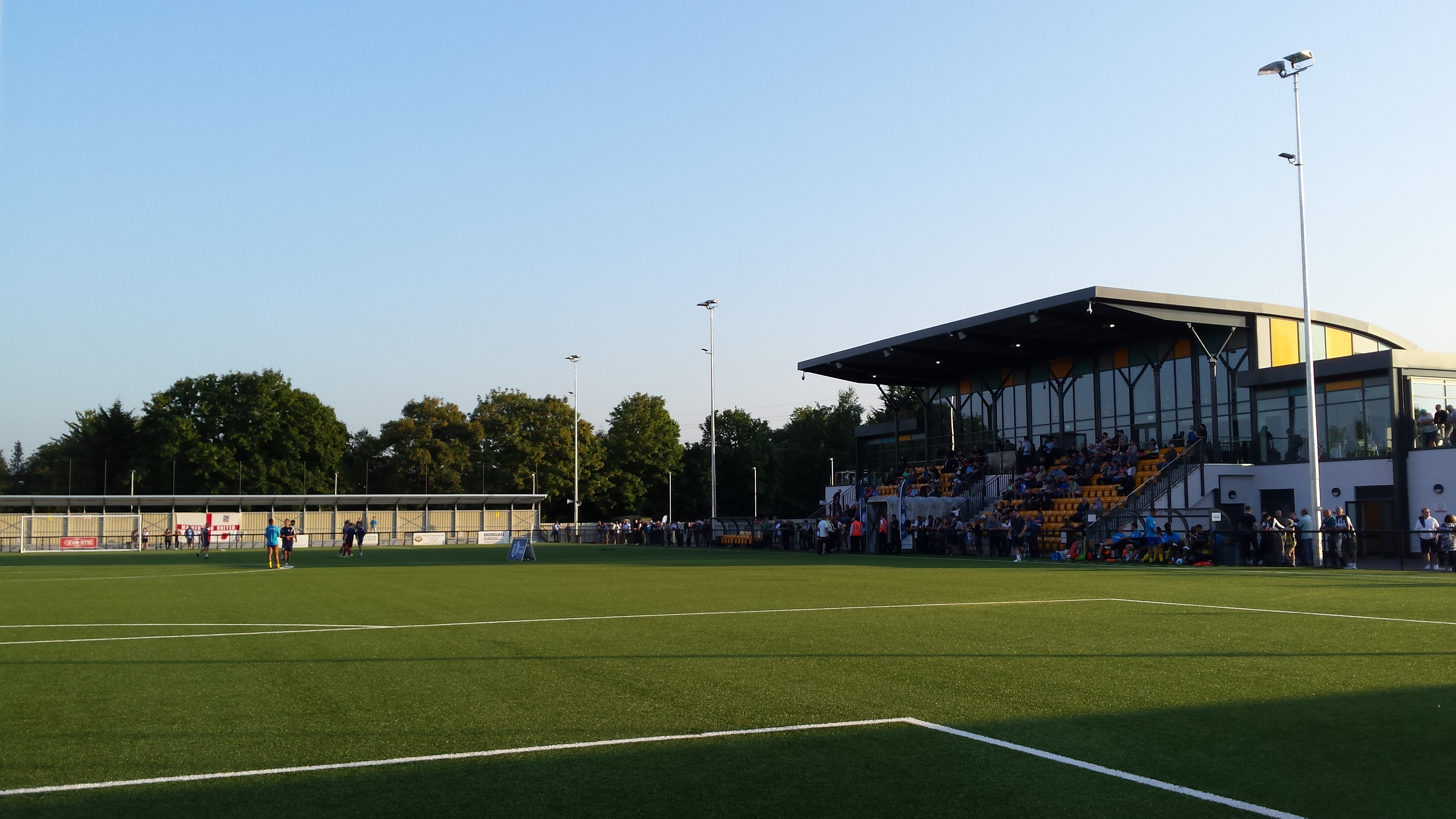
Arbour Park in 2017

Slough Town's home ground is the Arbour Park Stadium, Stoke Road, Slough, SL2 5AY.

The club started the 2016–17 season playing their early home games at Holloways Park, Windsor Road, Beaconsfield, Buckinghamshire. They moved back into the borough of Slough for the first time in over a decade on 29 August 2016 when they played their first game at the new ground, Arbour Park, against Hayes and Yeading United, winning 2–1.

The pitch at Arbour Park is 3G and is registered as FIFA Quality.

=== Ground History ===
Season	Club Name	Ground
1889–90 to 1938–39	Slough F.C.	Dolphin Ground/Stadium
1939–40 to 1940–41	Slough F.C.	Slough Cricket Ground
1941–42 to 1942–43	Slough F.C.	Maidenhead United’s York Road
1943–44 to 1945–46	Slough United	Slough Social Centre
1946–47	Slough United	Dolphin Stadium/Slough Social Centre
1947–48	Slough United/Town	Dolphin Stadium
1948–49 to 1973–74	Slough Town	Dolphin Stadium
1974–75 to 2002–03	Slough Town	Wexham Park Stadium
2003–04 to 2006–07	Slough Town	Windsor & Eton’s Stag Meadow
2007–08 to 2016–17	Slough Town	Beaconsfield SYOB's Holloways Park
2016–17 – today	Slough Town	Arbour Park Stadium

From its foundation in 1889 until 1939, the club played at the Dolphin Ground which became known as the Dolphin Stadium in 1929. It was located just to the east of the town centre. The club left the Dolphin Stadium in 1939–40 season initially playing at the Slough Cricket Club Ground. In the 1941–42 and 1942–43 seasons Slough played home games at Maidenhead United's York Road ground. With the amalgamation with Slough Centre F.C. to form Slough United in July 1943 the club moved to Social Centre Stadium. As Slough United the club returned to the Dolphin Stadium for most of the 1946–47 season. On 12 April 1947 the club played their first match at the new £5000 Belfast Avenue Stadium at the Social Centre, defeating Bedford Avenue F.C. 6–0. After the demerger from Slough Centre in the summer of 1947 the club returned to the Dolphin Stadium in 1947–48 season and stayed at the ground until the end of the 1973–74 season.

From the 1974–75 season Slough Town played at the Wexham Park Stadium. At the end of the 2002–03 season, financial disagreements with the stadium's owners led to the club's eviction. During the next four seasons (2003–04 to 2006–07) the club was based in Windsor, ground-sharing with Windsor & Eton at their Stag Meadow ground. In the summer of 2007, the club agreed a three-year ground-share with Beaconsfield SYCOB. This was extended to cover the 2010–11 season, and continued until Slough moved into their new ground, Arbour Park, on 29 August 2016.

In June 2009, Slough Town made a proposal that was submitted to Slough Borough Council for permission to build a new stadium within the Borough of Slough. The proposed location for the development was the Arbour Vale school site on Stoke Road, to the north of the town. In addition to a state-of-the-art stadium, the plans included affordable housing and sports fields. An artist's impression of the new ground was released in March 2012. In 2018, after opening two years prior, Arbour Park hosted a number of games in the 2018 CONIFA World Football Cup.

== Players ==
=== Current squad ===
Updated 17 November 2026

Note: Flags indicate national team as defined under FIFA eligibility rules; some limited exceptions apply. Players may hold more than one non-FIFA nationality.

No.	Pos.	Nation	Player
1	GK	IRL	Killian Barrett (on loan from Barrow)
2	DF	LCA	Terell Thomas
4	MF	KEN	Henry Ochieng (captain)
5	DF	ENG	Joe Morrison
6	MF	ENG	Shay Spencer (on loan from Reading)
7	FW	ENG	Jared Myers
8	MF	ENG	Kyle Brooks
9	FW	ENG	Ruben Shakpoke
10	MF	ENG	Johnny Goddard
11	FW	ENG	Luke Holness
13	GK	ENG	Michael Edegbe

No.	Pos.	Nation	Player
14	DF	ENG	Toby Byron (on loan from Sutton United)
16	MF	ENG	Dan Roth
17	FW	ENG	Louis Walsh
18	FW	GAM	Saikou Janneh
21	MF	ENG	Jaiden Drakes-Thomas
25	DF	ENG	Elijah Oladunjoye (on loan from Aldershot Town)
27	DF	ENG	Jordan Thomas
28	FW	ENG	Dennon Lewis
29	MF	ZIM	Munashe Sundire
30	MF	ENG	Dennis Adeniran

=== Out on loan ===
Note: Flags indicate national team as defined under FIFA eligibility rules; some limited exceptions apply. Players may hold more than one non-FIFA nationality.

No.	Pos.	Nation	Player
15	MF	ENG	Brian Nelson (at Chippenham Town until 4 December 2026)
19	FW	GHA	Godlove Oppong (at Berkhamsted until 1 December 2026)

No.	Pos.	Nation	Player
20	DF	COD	Balu Makumbi (at Bedford Town until 29 November 2026)
26	FW	ENG	Josh Adepoju (at Chippenham Town until 4 December 2026)

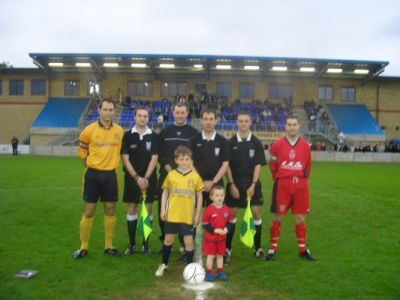
Slough Town vs Hampton & Richmond Borough in the Isthmian League Cup final in 2005

== Club staff ==
Position	Name
First Team Manager	Steve McKimm
Assistant Manager	Barry Moore
First Team Coach & Head of Academy	Ryan Case
First Team Assistant Coach	Jefferson Louis
Goalkeeping Coach	Dashun Cooper
Kit Manager	Trent Phillips

== Club records ==
- Record league win: 17–0 v Railway Clearing House, 4 March 1922
- Record cup win: 16–0 v Wolverton, 7 December 1935
- Record league defeat: 9–0 v Aylesbury United, 20 April 1929 and 9–0 v AFC Wimbledon, Saturday, 31 March 2007
- Record cup defeat: 11–1 v Chesham Town 5 February 1910
- Record transfer fee paid: £18,000 for Colin Fielder from Farnborough Town in 1991
- Record transfer fee received: £25,000 for Lloyd Owusu from Brentford in 1998
- Best Berks & Bucks Senior Cup run: Winners 11 times (1902–03, 1919–20, 1923–24, 1926–27, 1935–36, 1954–55, 1970–71, 1971–72, 1976–77, 1980–81, 2018–19)
- Best FA Cup run: Second round proper 9 times (1970–71, 1979–80, 1982–83, 1985–86, 1986–87, 2004–05, 2017–18, 2018–19 and 2025–26)
- Best FA Trophy run: Semi-finalists (1976–77 and 1997–98)
- Best FA Amateur Cup run: Finalists (1972–73)
- Youngest ever player in a match day squad: Oliver Spicer, 16 years 11 months (12 August 2023 vs Dover Athletic)

== Sources ==
- Slough Town at the Football Club History Database
- Slough United at the Football Club History Database
- Slough Centre at the Football Club History Database
