= Henry Ochieng =

Kenyan footballer (born 1998)

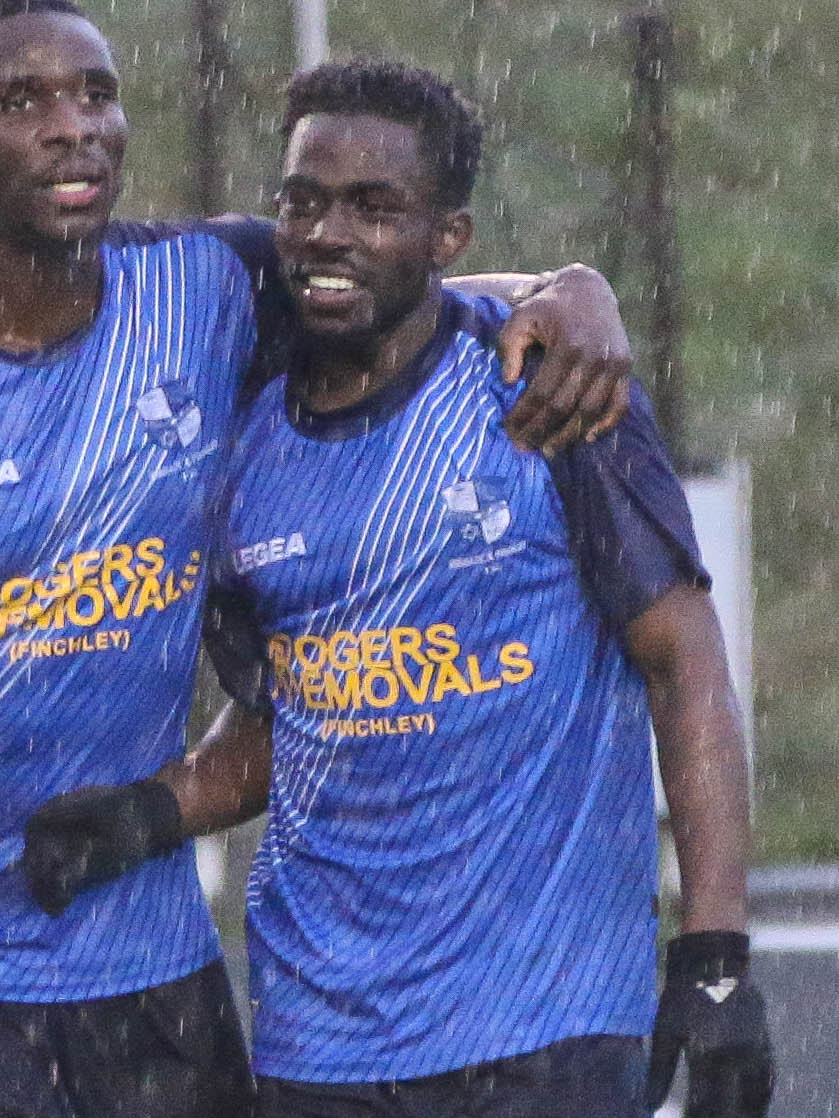
- Ochieng playing for Wingate & Finchley in November 2019

Personal information
- Full name: Henry Oliver Ochieng
- Date of birth: 11 November 1998 (age 27)
- Place of birth: Redbridge, England
- Height: 1.79 m (5 ft 10 in)
- Position: Midfielder

Team information
- Current team: Slough Town
- Number: 4

Youth career
- Buckhurst Hill
- 2009–2015: West Ham United
- 2015–2016: Leyton Orient

Senior career*
Years	Team	Apps	(Gls)
2016–2018	Leyton Orient	12	(0)
2018–2019	Braintree Town	5	(0)
2019	Welwyn Garden City	7	(0)
2019–2020	Wingate & Finchley	24	(1)
2020–2021	Cork City	17	(0)
2021	Watford	0	(0)
2021–2022	Billericay Town	21	(0)
2022–2023	Chelmsford City	27	(1)
2023	Aldershot Town	10	(0)
2023–2024	Chelmsford City	32	(0)
2024–	Slough Town	53	(0)

International career^{‡}
2018	Kenya U23	1	(0)

Managerial career
- 2026: Slough Town (joint-interim)
- * Club domestic league appearances and goals as of 13:16, 21 October 2026 (UTC) ‡ National team caps and goals as of 19:50, 13 January 2019 (UTC)

Henry Oliver Ochieng (born 11 November 1998) is a professional footballer who plays as a midfielder for National League South club Slough Town. Born in England, he represents Kenya internationally.

== Club career ==
Ochieng was raised in Ilford and attended St Aubyn's School in Woodford Green and later Forest School in Walthamstow. He started his career with local junior side Buckhurst Hill before being spotted and signed by the youth team at West Ham United in 2009. He signed a two-year scholarship with Leyton Orient in 2015.

Ochieng made his first-team debut on 8 November 2016 as an 81st-minute substitute for Žan Benedičič in Orient's 1–0 away defeat to Brighton & Hove Albion U23 in the EFL Trophy. He signed his first professional contract in December. He made his League Two debut on 25 March 2017 as an 81st-minute substitute for Nigel Atangana in Orient's 3–0 defeat away to Crawley Town. Ochieng was released by Leyton Orient in March 2018.

Ahead of the 2018–19 season, Ochieng signed for newly promoted National League club Braintree Town. Ochieng made five appearances for the Iron before joining Welwyn Garden City on 28 March 2019. He joined Wingate & Finchley for the 2019–20 season. On 30 January 2020, it was announced by Wingate & Finchley that Ochieng had been sold for an undisclosed fee to League of Ireland Premier Division side Cork City, returning to professional football following 31 appearances for the club. The following day, Cork City officially announced the signing of Ochieng.

In January 2021, Ochieng joined Championship side Watford, signing a contract with the under-23s until the end of the 2020–21 season. Ochieng joined Billericay Town in December 2021.

On 15 July 2022, Ochieng joined rivals Chelmsford City.

On 13 February 2023, he joined Aldershot Town on an eighteen-month contract.

On 27 October 2023, Ochieng returned to Chelmsford, following his departure from Aldershot. On 17 June 2024, Ochieng left Chelmsford for a second time.

He joined Slough Town for the 2024–25 season. On 6 September 2026, following the sacking of Alan Julian, Ochieng was named as joint-interim manager of Slough Town, alongside John Goddard and Ryan Case.

== International career ==
Ochieng, whose parents were born in Kenya, was called up by the Kenya national team for their 2019 Africa Cup of Nations qualifier against Sierra Leone in November 2018, but the match was later cancelled. He instead made his debut for the Kenya U23 against Mauritius on 14 November 2018 in 2019 Africa U-23 Cup of Nations qualification.

== Career statistics ==
As of 15 January 2025

Appearances and goals by club, season and competition
Club	Season	League			National Cup		League Cup		Other		Total	
Club	Season	Division	Apps	Goals	Apps	Goals	Apps	Goals	Apps	Goals	Apps	Goals
Leyton Orient	2016–17	League Two	6	0	0	0	0	0	1 (Note: One appearance in the EFL Trophy)	0	7	0
Leyton Orient	2017–18	National League	6	0	1	0	—		0	0	7	0
Leyton Orient	Total		12	0	1	0	—		1	0	14	0
Braintree Town	2018–19	National League	5	0	0	0	—		2 (Note: Two appearances in the FA Trophy)	0	7	0
Welwyn Garden City	2018–19	SFL Division One Central	7	0	0	0	—		0	0	7	0
Wingate & Finchley	2019–20	Isthmian League Premier Division	24	1	3	0	—		6 (Note: Two appearances in the FA Trophy, two appearances and one goal in the Middlesex Senior Cup, one appearance in the London Senior Cup, one appearance in the Alan Turvey Trophy)	1	33	2
Cork City	2020	League of Ireland Premier Division	17	0	2	0	—		0	0	19	0
Watford	2020–21	Championship	0	0	0	0	0	0	0	0	0	0
Billericay Town	2021–22	National League South	21	0	0	0	—		4	0	25	0
Chelmsford City	2022–23	National League South	27	1	5	1	—		3	0	35	2
Aldershot Town	2022–23	National League	10	0	0	0	—		0	0	10	0
Aldershot Town	2023–24	National League	1	0	0	0	—		1	0	2	0
Aldershot Town	Total		11	0	0	0	—		0	0	12	0
Chelmsford City	2023–24	National League South	32	0	0	0	2	0	4	0	38	0
Slough Town	2024–25	National League South	24	0	4	0	—		3	0	31	0
Career total			180	2	15	1	2	0	24	1	221	4
