= Jordan Stewart (footballer, born 1995) =

Northern Irish footballer

Personal information
- Date of birth: 31 March 1995 (age 31)
- Place of birth: Belfast, Northern Ireland
- Position: Forward

Team information
- Current team: Glentoran
- Number: 10

Youth career
- Linfield
- Crusaders
- Windsor Youth
- –2013: Glentoran

Senior career*
Years	Team	Apps	(Gls)
2013–2015	Glentoran	67	(23)
2015–2017	Swindon Town	8	(0)
2016	→ Grimsby Town (loan)	2	(0)
2017–2024	Linfield	144	(37)
2023	→ Glenavon (loan)	5	(0)
2024–2025	Crusaders	26	(5)
2025–	Glentoran	27	(9)

International career^{‡}
2013	Northern Ireland U19	2	(0)
2015	Northern Ireland U21	2	(0)
- * Club domestic league appearances and goals as of 29 April 2026 ‡ National team caps and goals as of 17 November 2015 (UTC)

Jordan Stewart (born 31 March 1995) is a Northern Irish professional footballer who plays for Glentoran. He has also been called up for the Northern Ireland U21s. Stewart can play as both a midfielder and as a centre forward.

== Club career ==
=== Glentoran ===
Stewart started his football career as a junior playing for Linfield, Crusaders and Windsor Youth before joining Glentoran.

During the 2014–2015 season, Stewart made 36 appearances for Glentoran and scored 13 goals, with his most notable game being a hat-trick against Warrenpoint. In July 2015, Stewart signed a contract which would keep him at Glentoran until 2018. On 14 July 2015, he was suspended for two weeks for breaching his contract by playing for another team on 11 July.

Stewart's final goals during his spell with Glentoran came in the 2–2 home draw against reigning champions Crusaders. His first goal of the game was a 30-yard strike which gained much media attention across the United Kingdom.

=== Swindon Town ===
During his career at Glentoran, Stewart gained the attention of Premier League and Football League clubs in England including Stoke City, Crystal Palace and Middlesbrough. However, on 21 August 2015 and several days after an unofficial announcement, Glentoran confirmed Stewart would move to Swindon Town in an undisclosed deal was believed to be between £50,000 and £55,000. Stewart's contract was reported to be for two years with a plus one option. Only 6 weeks into his time at Swindon he made it clear to club chairman Lee Power that he was homesick and did not want to continue to play for Swindon Town and that wanted to return to Northern Ireland. Glentoran showed interest in buying him back, and were also attempting to loan him back until the end of the 2015–2016 season until the deal fell through. This was because of Swindon's instance that a clause be included to allow a 24-hour recall to happen. This, although practised in England, is against FIFA regulations which only permit loan players to move in transfer windows. Glentoran therefore refused to sign the deal and referred the matter to the Irish Football Association who confirmed that they would have blocked the players registration.

On 24 March 2016, Stewart joined National League side Grimsby Town on loan until the end of the season. Having made two appearances in his loan spell, on 22 April 2016, Stewart has returned to parent club Swindon Town.

He scored his first goal for the club against Queens Park Rangers in an EFL Cup match on 10 August 2016. He also scored in the penalty shoot-out, however Swindon Town lost 4–2 in penalties.

On 2 May 2017, it was announced that Stewart would leave Swindon upon the expiry of his contract in June 2017.

=== Linfield ===
Preceding his release from Swindon, on 8 May 2017 and despite promising to re-join Glentoran, Stewart returned to Northern Ireland accepting a much higher wage to join Linfield. On 28 June 2017, Stewart scored on his Linfield debut in their UEFA Champions League qualifier against La Fiorita, netting the winner in their 1–0 victory in the 89th minute.

=== Glenavon ===
On 31 January 2023, it was announced that Stewart had signed on loan with Glenavon until the end of the season.

=== Crusaders ===
Stewart played for Crusaders for the 2024–25 season.

=== Glentoran ===
On 19 May 2025, it was announced Stewart would return to Glentoran on a two-year contract.

== International career ==
Stewart has represented Northern Ireland national football team at Under-19 level, making his debut in the 1–1 draw against France. In August 2015, Stewart was called up to the Under-21 set-up by coach Jim Magilton for their fixtures against Scotland and Iceland.

== Personal life ==
Stewart attended Belfast Met. His grandfather, Phil Scott, was also a footballer. His Grandfather got to see Stewart score at the National Stadium for Glentoran against Linfield.

Stewart has two children with his partner Corrie Donaghy.

== Career statistics ==
=== Club ===
As of match played 5 April 2025

Appearances and goals by club, season and competition
Club	Season	League			National cup (Note: Includes Irish Cup, FA Cup)		League cup (Note: Includes NIFL Cup, EFL Cup)		Continental		Other		Total	
Club	Season	Division	Apps	Goals	Apps	Goals	Apps	Goals	Apps	Goals	Apps	Goals	Apps	Goals
Glentoran	2013-14	NIFL Premiership	28	8	2	0	0	0	0	0	1 (Note: Appearance(s) in Setanta Sports Cup)	0	31	8
Glentoran	2014-15	NIFL Premiership	36	13	3	0	2	1	—		—		41	14
Glentoran	2015-16	NIFL Premiership	3	2	0	0	0	0	1 (Note: Appearance(s) in UEFA Europa League)	0	1 (Note: Appearance(s) in NIFL Charity Shield)	1	5	3
Glentoran	Total		67	23	5	0	2	1	1	0	2	1	77	25
Swindon Town	2015-16	League One	1	0	0	0	0	0	—		0	0	1	0
Swindon Town	2016-17	League One	7	0	1	0	1	1	—		0	0	9	1
Swindon Town	Total		8	0	1	0	1	1	—		0	0	10	1
Grimsby Town (loan)	2015-16	National League	2	0	0	0	—		—		0	0	2	0
Linfield	2017-18	NIFL Premiership	23	5	1	0	2	1	3 (Note: Appearance(s) in UEFA Champions League)	1	2 (Note: One appearance in NIFL Charity Shield, One appearance in Scottish Challenge Cup)	0	31	7
Linfield	2019-20	NIFL Premiership	30	10	1	0	3	1	—		—		34	11
Linfield	2019-20	NIFL Premiership	19	4	0	0	1	0	7 (Note: Two appearances in UEFA Champions League, Five appearances in UEFA Europa League)	0	—		27	4
Linfield	2020-21	NIFL Premiership	36	11	3	0	—		0	0	—		39	11
Linfield	2021-22	NIFL Premiership	30	6	1	0	2	1	2	0	—		35	7
Linfield	2022-23	NIFL Premiership	3	0	1	0	0	0	6 (Note: Four appearances in UEFA Champions League, One appearance in UEFA Europa League, One appearance in UEFA Europa Conference League)	0	1	0	11	0
Linfield	2023-24	NIFL Premiership	3	1	1	0	0	0	0	0	—		4	1
Linfield	Total		144	37	8	0	8	3	18	1	3	0	181	41
Glenavon (loan)	2022-23	NIFL Premiership	5	0	0	0	0	0	—		—		5	0
Crusaders	2024-25	NIFL Premiership	26	5	1	0	2	0	1 (Note: Appearance(s) in UEFA Europa Conference League)	0	—		30	5
Career total			252	65	15	0	13	5	20	1	5	1	305	72

== Honours ==
=== Club ===
Glentoran

- Irish Cup (1): 2014–15
- NIFL Charity Shield (1): 2015–16
