= Yaser Kasim =

Iraqi footballer

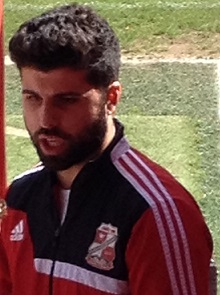
- Kasim with Swindon Town in 2014

Personal information
- Full name: Yaser Safa Kasim Al-Kadefaje
- Date of birth: 10 May 1991 (age 35)
- Place of birth: Karrada, Baghdad, Iraq
- Height: 5 ft 10 in (1.78 m)
- Position: Central midfielder

Team information
- Current team: Margate
- Number: 4

Youth career
- 2006–2007: Fulham
- 2007–2010: Tottenham Hotspur

Senior career*
Years	Team	Apps	(Gls)
2010–2013	Brighton & Hove Albion	1	(0)
2012–2013	→ Luton Town (loan)	11	(1)
2013	→ Macclesfield Town (loan)	5	(0)
2013–2017	Swindon Town	122	(7)
2017–2019	Northampton Town	6	(0)
2019	Örebro SK	12	(0)
2020	Erbil	5	(0)
2021–2022	Zakho	8	(2)
2022–2023	Welling United	9	(1)
2023	Gloucester City	1	(0)
2023	Margate	12	(0)
2023–2024	Eastbourne Borough	14	(1)
2024	Margate	12	(0)
2026–	Margate		

International career
2012	Iraq U23	1	(0)
2014–2021	Iraq	21	(3)
- * Club domestic league appearances and goals as of 12:42, 30 May 2024 (UTC)

Yaser Safa Kasim Al-Kadefaje (Arabic: ياسر صفاء قاسم القضيفجي; born 10 May 1991) is an Iraqi footballer who plays as a midfielder for Margate.

== Early life ==
At age 6 Kasim left Iraq with his family to Jordan and after spending a year in Jordan where he experienced his first taste of school, the family arrived in England. His mother told of a story of when he was young, kicking a ball in their second floor flat in West London, the peppy Yaser would break everything at home and have the neighbours below complaining about her son. They told her to take him to the park to play. She remembered one amusing memory of Yaser telling her to stand in goal so he could take shots at her!

Later Yaser's parents would take him to the Westway Sports Centre, paying £2 a week to play a variety of sports. They wanted him to take up tennis and he was a competent player however he pleaded to his parents to allow him to play football, his true passion.

That passion for football was sown in the city of Baghdad. His father recounted when the family were living in Baghdad where his son was returning home with his filthy clothes knee deep in mud. One local shopkeeper once told Yaser's father "What kind of player is your son, he’s fighting everyone and taking on everyone!” The player explained how much both his parents had sacrificed for him and his siblings by leaving behind Baghdad under UN sanctions in the early 90s for London for a better life and mentioned that it "completes his heart", when he returned to Iraq and the national team and put on the shirt on because of what his parents had given up and thanked them for all they had done for him.

One of the significant moments in his career and a turning point in his life came when at the age of 18 he turned down a professional contract at Tottenham Hotspur feeling that he would not get the opportunity progress at the club having seen other players languish in their reserves. "I spent nearly a year out of football", Yaser said. "It was a very tough year but the one person that was there for me was my dad. So I really appreciated that". That year and half out of football had a profound effect on the player and made him mentally stronger and that much more eager to succeed in a sport he knew he could play at the top level.

== Club career ==
His career in England started in the youth teams at Premier League side Fulham. A coach at one of the sport centres that Kasim frequented took him to Fulham and he joined the youth setup there but left after a few months and switched to North London club Tottenham Hotspur.

He joined the youth setup at Spurs in 2007 and remained until his 18th birthday with the club. He departed the club in the summer of 2010, after turning down a pro contract, claiming that he did not feel the club had the player's best interest in mind. He joined Brighton & Hove Albion shortly after.

=== Brighton & Hove Albion ===
He joined Brighton & Hove Albion in October 2010, signing a short-term contract until January 2011. On 20 November, Kasim was an unused substitute during the 2–2 draw against Bristol Rovers. and during January 2011 it was revealed that he had signed a new short-term contract until 30 June. On 7 May 2011, Kasim made his debut for Brighton starting against Notts County.

On 12 July 2012, Kasim joined Conference Premier side Luton Town on a six-month loan deal. He played as a defensive midfielder through Luton's pre-season games, establishing himself as a first-team regular, and debuted for the club on 11 August in a 2–2 draw with Gateshead.

On 8 February 2013, Kasim joined Conference Premier side Macclesfield Town on an initial one-month loan.

On 21 May 2013, Kasim was released by Brighton.

=== Swindon Town ===
The midfielder finally found regular first team football at the County Ground after an unproductive spell at Brighton & Hove Albion and loans stints at Macclesfield Town and Luton Town. Yaser signed a three-year deal with Swindon Town after a trial with the club. Despite being at the club for a few months, he was subject to a deadline day bid from an unknown championship side on deadline day that was rejected. In his first season with the club, Kasim played 45 times for the club, forming a midfield partnership with Australian Massimo Luongo. Manager Mark Cooper made him an instrumental part of the team, the team also reached the final of the Southern section of the JPT but lost on penalties to Peterborough United. Yaser converted his penalty. Yaser scored his first goal for the club on 21 December 2013. Scoring a goal in the 77th minute vs Coventry City. He scored his second goal in a 2–1 win over Peterborough United. In October 2013, Kasim signed a contract extension keeping him at the club till 2016. He received a one match suspension for an accumulation of yellow cards, he missed a league fixture vs Port Vale. The 2013/14 season ended with Swindon missing out on a place in the promotion play-offs as they finished 8th overall.

In his second season with Swindon, Yaser played 41 games, scoring three goals in all competitions. His first goal came against Crewe Alexandra in League One, his second came against Chesterfield in the same competition, while the last was against former club Brighton & Hove Albion in the league up. Swindon finished 4th in League One, which meant they qualified to the Championship play-offs. They reached the final but lost to Preston North End, narrowly missing out on promotion. Kasim missed some matches during January due to being called up for Iraq in the 2015 AFC Asian Cup, in which Iraq finished 4th.

In his third season in the club, Yaser was an established member of the squad and became the unofficial third captain for the club. He played 29 games, scoring once. A league goal vs Chesterfield in a 1–0 win. Swindon finished in a disappointing 15th position.

In his fourth season with Swindon, the club was relegated to EFL League Two. In his fourth and final season with Swindon Kasim had his Twitter account hacked, while his national coach questioned his desire to play for Iraq, and he spent a large percentage of the season on the medical table compounded by persistent groin and hip injuries – with his club ending the season relegated to the fourth tier of English football!

For most of his final year his head coach Luke Williams at Swindon Town turned into his injury spokesman giving weekly updates on his recuperation rather than his football coach and at each press conference it was the same comment "Yaser's situation is ongoing".

=== Northampton Town ===
In the summer of 2017 after he opted to leave Swindon Town, Kasim signed a two-year deal with Northampton Town of League One. He left the club in January 2019.

=== Örebro SK ===
In the summer of 2019, Kasim signed a one-year contract with Swedish club Örebro SK, playing in the Allsvenskan. He was released after the 2019 season.

=== Erbil ===
In January 2020, Kasim signed for Iraqi Premier League club Erbil in the hope that it would further increase his chances of being recalled to the Iraqi national team. He was unveiled to the media in a press conference alongside Sherko Karim. He made five appearances for the club before the Iraqi Premier League season was suspended and then cancelled due to the COVID-19 outbreak. In June 2020, just five months after moving to Iraq, Kasim left Erbil claiming he hadn't been paid wages since arriving at the club.

=== Zakho ===
After leaving Erbil, Kasim was close to a move to South America but returned to Iraq ahead of the 2021-2022 Iraqi Premier League season, signing a one-year contract for Erbil's Kurdish rivals Zakho, unveiled in the number 5 he previously wore for the national team. Following an excellent start to the season which saw him score twice and Zakho in the top six, Kasim was recalled to the Iraqi national team. On 15 January 2022, it was announced that Kasim will play one more game before joining a club in the Spanish second division, reported to be CF Fuenlabrada. However, Kasim's move to Spain fell through and the player was left without a club for the remainder of the 2021–22 season.

Kasim went on trial with National League side Notts County in July 2022. In September 2022, Kasim announced his retirement from professional football.

=== Welling United ===
On 16 October 2022, Kasim signed for National League South side Welling United. He left on January 4, 2023, as a mutual agreement.

=== Gloucester City ===
Following his departure from Welling, Kasim joined National League North club Gloucester City. However, he announced his departure to take up a coaching role after playing just one game.

=== Margate ===
On 24 February 2023, Kasim signed for Isthmian League Premier Division club Margate having previously played with assistant manager Ben Greenhalgh at Brighton & Hove Albion.

=== Eastbourne Borough ===
Ahead of the 2023–24 season, Kasim signed for National League South club Eastbourne Borough.

=== Returns to Margate ===
In January 2024, Kasim returned to Margate.

In May 2024, Kasim announced his retirement from football in order to focus on coaching and other industries.

In January 2026, Kasim came out of retirement and returned to Margate again.

== International career ==
Kasim made his debut for Iraq against China on 5 March 2014. According to football writer Hassanin Mubarak no player in the history of the Iraq national football team had made his position his own after only 90 minutes, but Yaser Kasim, the Baghdad-born West Londoner, who after one match had starred the midfield in Iraq's final Asian Cup qualifier against China on his debut.

Kasim had refused an earlier call-up prior to the Asian Cup qualifying game with Saudi Arabia, deciding to concentrate on playing for Swindon Town in League One, where he had become a key figure in the club's five-man midfield, which also included Australia's Massimo Luongo. He may also have refused the call-up after he was made to pay his own way to Baghdad from London in the two previous trips with the Olympic side. Yaser along with Ahmed Yasin and Osama Rashid were first selected in the national side in 2011 under Wolfgang Sidka.

After several years out of the national team set-up, Kasim was called up by Iraq for the 2021 FIFA Arab Cup under new manager Dick Advocaat following his impressive start to the Iraqi Premier League season with Zakho where he scored two goals as his club sat in the top six at the time of his call-up.

=== 2016 Olympic Games ===
After his projected £1m move to Swansea City fell apart at the last moment, everything fell apart. The Swansea move falling through was the start of his downfall, he went to Spain to train with the Iraqi U-23 where he was expected to be named one of the three over-aged players at the Olympics in Rio, but he was not match fit, a bit overweight and in one warm-up match against Zenit St Petersburg the coach sent him on as a late sub and around 15 minutes later took him off! It was to send him a message that he was not pulling his weight in training. He then requested three days leave, stating something about signing a new contract with his club and then went AWOL, switched off his phone and never explained why he had not returned. His withdrawal came as a big surprise. Yaser had been the first overage player selected by the U-23 coach when the player was in Baghdad recovering from an injury but he left unexpectedly. He left and never returned, his mobile was shut and officials from Olympic and Iraq FA were unable to contact him. One Iraq FA official wrote a report on the U-23 team's stay in Europe and recommended Yaser should be suspended. The player never explained fully the decision why he left.

Kasim refused to playing several times for national teams in 2015 & 2016 and 2017. In September 2016, he attended after pressure from former coach Radhi Shenaishil and claimed an injury. he had left before than a month ago the Olympic team training camp before Rio 2016. In 2017, Kasim Ignore invitations from the new coach Basim Qasim, before announcing his retirement. then retreat from retirement after months. After returning from his decision to retire, he played a friendly match against Saudi Arabia national team on 28 February 2018.

== Career statistics ==
=== Club ===
As of end of 2023–24 season

Appearances and goals by club, season and competition
Club	Season	League			FA Cup		League Cup		Other		Total	
Club	Season	Division	Apps	Goals	Apps	Goals	Apps	Goals	Apps	Goals	Apps	Goals
Brighton & Hove Albion	2010–11	League One	1	0	0	0	0	0	0	0	1	0
Brighton & Hove Albion	2011–12	Championship	0	0	1	0	0	0	0	0	1	0
Brighton & Hove Albion	2012–13	Championship	0	0	0	0	0	0	0	0	0	0
Brighton & Hove Albion	Total		1	0	1	0	0	0	0	0	2	0
Luton Town (loan)	2012–13	Conference Premier	11	1	0	0	—		0	0	11	1
Macclesfield Town (loan)	2012–13	Conference Premier	5	0	0	0	—		0	0	5	0
Swindon Town	2013–14	League One	37	2	1	0	3	0	4 (Note: Appearance(s) in Football League Trophy)	0	45	2
Swindon Town	2014–15	League One	38	2	1	0	2	1	3 (Note: Appearance(s) in Football League play-offs)	0	44	3
Swindon Town	2015–16	League One	27	1	1	0	1	0	0	0	29	1
Swindon Town	2016–17	League One	20	2	2	0	1	0	1 (Note: Appearance(s) in EFL Trophy)	0	24	2
Swindon Town	Total		122	7	5	0	7	1	8	0	142	8
Northampton Town	2017–18	League One	6	0	1	0	1	0	2	0	10	0
Örebro	2019	Allsvenskan	12	0	0	0	0	0	0	0	12	0
Erbil	2019–20	Iraqi Premier League	5	0	0	0	0	0	0	0	5	0
Zakho	2021–22	Iraqi Premier League	8	2	0	0	0	0	0	0	8	2
Welling United	2022–23	National League South	9	1	0	0	—		2 (Note: Appearance(s) in FA Trophy)	0	11	1
Gloucester City	2022–23	National League North	1	0	0	0	—		0	0	1	0
Margate	2022–23	Isthmian Premier Division	12	0	0	0	—		1 (Note: Appearance(s) in Kent Senior Cup)	1	13	1
Eastbourne Borough	2023–24	National League South	14	1	1	0	—		2 (Note: Appearance(s) in Sussex Senior Cup)	0	17	1
Margate	2023–24	Isthmian League Premier Division	12	0	0	0	—		0	0	12	0
Career total			218	12	8	0	8	1	15	1	249	14

=== International ===
Appearances and goals by national team and year
National team	Year	Apps	Goals
Iraq	2014	6	1
Iraq	2015	11	2
Iraq	2016	1	0
Iraq	2018	1	0
Iraq	2021	2	0
Total		21	3

Scores and results list Iraq's goal tally first, score column indicates score after each Kasim goal.

List of international goals scored by Yaser Kasim
No.	Date	Venue	Opponent	Score	Result	Competition	Ref.
1	17 November 2014	Prince Faisal bin Fahd Sports City Stadium, Riyadh, Saudi Arabia	Oman	1–0	1–1	22nd Arabian Gulf Cup	
2	12 January 2015	Brisbane Stadium, Brisbane, Australia	Jordan	1–0	1–0	2015 AFC Asian Cup	
3	31 March 2015	Khalid bin Mohammed Stadium, Sharjah, United Arab Emirates	DR Congo	1–0	1–0	Friendly	

== Honours ==
Iraq

- AFC Asian Cup fourth-place: 2015
