= Jake Evans (footballer, born 1998) =

English footballer

Personal information
- Full name: Jacob Finlay Evans
- Date of birth: 8 April 1998 (age 28)
- Place of birth: Swindon, England
- Height: 1.73 m (5 ft 8 in)
- Position: Central midfielder

Team information
- Current team: Gloucester City

Youth career
- 2008–2016: Swindon Town

Senior career*
Years	Team	Apps	(Gls)
2016–2017	Swindon Town	2	(0)
2017	→ Waterford (loan)	2	(0)
2017	→ Farnborough (loan)	4	(0)
2017–2018	Farnborough	16	(2)
2018–2020	Cardiff City	0	(0)
2020	→ Hemel Hempstead Town (loan)	7	(0)
2020	Hemel Hempstead Town	11	(2)
2020–2023	Hungerford Town	80	(14)
2023–2026	Chippenham Town	75	(5)
2024–2025	→ Gloucester City (loan)	15	(1)
2026-	Gloucester City	0	(0)
- * Club domestic league appearances and goals as of 19:45, 12 April 2025 (UTC)

Jacob Finlay Evans (born 8 April 1998) is an English professional footballer who plays as a central midfielder for Southern League Premier Division South club Gloucester City

== Club career ==
Having spent 10 years in the Swindon Town youth set-up, Evans signed a professional contract in April 2016. Evans made his professional debut for the Wiltshire side, coming on as a second-half substitute, in the 3–0 win against Shrewsbury Town.

On 22 February 2017, Evans joined Irish side Waterford on loan until June 2017. On 24 February 2017, Evans made his Waterford debut in their 1–0 away defeat against Athlone Town, on the opening day of the 2017 campaign. Injury would blight most of Evans time with Waterford and his loan ended in May 2017 and he made his final appearance in the club's 3–0 defeat to League of Ireland champions Dundalk.

On 19 August 2017, Evans joined Southern League Premier Division side Farnborough on a one-month loan deal. On the same day, Evans made his debut for the club during their 3–1 home defeat against Redditch United, replacing John Oyenuga in the 66th minute. Following the conclusion of his one-month loan spell, it was announced that Evans had joined Farnborough on a permanent deal.

Following a trial period with Championship side Cardiff City, Evans joined their development side on a deal until the end of the 2017–18 campaign.

In January 2020, Evans joined National League South Hemel Hempstead Town on loan.

On 14 December 2020, Evans joined National League South side Hungerford Town.

On 23 May 2023, Evans agreed to join National League South side, Chippenham Town.

== Career statistics ==
As of match played 12 April 2025

Club	Season	League			National Cup		League Cup		Other		Total	
Club	Season	Division	Apps	Goals	Apps	Goals	Apps	Goals	Apps	Goals	Apps	Goals
Swindon Town	2015–16	League One	1	0	0	0	0	0	0	0	1	0
Swindon Town	2016–17	League One	1	0	0	0	0	0	2 (Note: Appearances in the EFL Trophy)	0	3	0
Swindon Town	2017–18	League Two	0	0	—		0	0	0	0	0	0
Swindon Town	Total		2	0	0	0	0	0	2	0	4	0
Waterford (loan)	2017	League of Ireland First Division	2	0	0	0	1	0	—		3	0
Farnborough (loan)	2017–18	Southern League Premier Division	4	0	1	0	—		0	0	5	0
Farnborough	2017–18	Southern League Premier Division	16	2	—		—		3 (Note: Appearances in the FA Trophy)	0	19	2
Cardiff City	2017–18	Championship	0	0	—		—		—		0	0
Cardiff City	2018–19	Premier League	0	0	0	0	0	0	—		0	0
Cardiff City	2019–20	Championship	0	0	0	0	0	0	—		0	0
Cardiff City	Total		0	0	0	0	0	0	—		0	0
Hemel Hempstead Town (loan)	2019–20	National League South	7	0	—		—		—		7	0
Hemel Hempstead Town	2020–21	National League South	11	2	1	1	—		—		12	3
Hungerford Town	2020–21	National League South	3	1	—		—		1	0	4	1
Hungerford Town	2021–22	National League South	35	6	2	0	—		2	0	39	6
Hungerford Town	2022–23	National League South	42	7	0	0	—		4	2	46	9
Hungerford Town	Total		80	14	2	0	—		7	2	89	16
Chippenham Town	2023–24	National League South	32	3	0	0	—		1	0	33	3
Chippenham Town	2024–25	National League South	6	0	0	0	—		0	0	6	0
Chippenham Town	Total		38	3	0	0	—		1	0	39	3
Gloucester City (loan)	2024–25	Southern League Premier Division South	15	1	0	0	—		0	0	15	1
Career total			175	22	4	1	1	0	13	2	193	25
