= Harry Smith (footballer, born 1995) =

English footballer

Personal information
- Full name: Harry Roy Smith
- Date of birth: 18 May 1995 (age 31)
- Place of birth: Chatham, Kent, England
- Height: 6 ft 5 in (1.96 m)
- Position: Striker

Team information
- Current team: Swindon Town
- Number: 10

Youth career
- Brentford
- Chelsea
- Gillingham

Senior career*
| Years | Team | Apps | (Gls) |
- Tunbridge Wells
- Sevenoaks Town
| 2014–2015 | Sittingbourne | | |
| 2015–2016 | Folkestone Invicta | 19 | (13) |
| 2016–2018 | Millwall | 9 | (1) |
| 2017 | → Swindon Town (loan) | 14 | (2) |
| 2018–2019 | Macclesfield Town | 39 | (9) |
| 2019–2021 | Northampton Town | 35 | (7) |
| 2021 | → Motherwell (loan) | 5 | (0) |
| 2021–2023 | Leyton Orient | 49 | (13) |
| 2022 | → Exeter City (loan) | 5 | (0) |
| 2023 | → Barnet (loan) | 11 | (7) |
| 2023–2024 | Sutton United | 37 | (11) |
| 2024– | Swindon Town | 43 | (16) |
- * Club domestic league appearances and goals as of 18:38, 20 August 2025 (UTC)

Harry Roy Smith (born 18 May 1995) is an English professional footballer who plays as a striker for EFL League Two club Swindon Town.

== Career ==
Born in Chatham, Smith played youth football for Brentford, Chelsea and Gillingham, before playing non-league football for Tunbridge Wells, Sevenoaks Town, Sittingbourne and Folkestone Invicta. While at Folkestone Invicta he had trials at Aberdeen, Gillingham, and Millwall, before signing a two-year professional contract with Millwall in August 2016. He made his debut for Millwall on 8 November 2016, scoring twice in an EFL Trophy game against Luton Town.

On 12 July 2017, Smith joined League Two side Swindon Town on a season-long loan. On the opening day of the 2017–18 campaign, Smith made his Swindon debut in their 2–1 away victory against Carlisle United, replacing the injured Luke Norris in the 34th minute. On 30 September 2017, Smith scored his first goal for the club during their 2–0 home victory over Cambridge United, doubling Swindon's advantage in the 88th minute after Keshi Anderson had given the Robins the lead. On 26 December 2017, Smith's loan spell at Swindon was terminated following a lack of game time.

He was released by Millwall at the end of the 2017–18 season.

On 4 July 2018, Smith opted to join newly promoted League Two side Macclesfield Town on a one-year deal.

On 17 May 2019, it was announced that Smith would join League Two side Northampton Town on a three-year deal for an undisclosed fee on 1 July 2019. On 17 September 2019 against Stevenage Smith came on as a half time substitute with the scores at 0-0 and then scored what proved to be the winning goal, his first for the club, before later being sent off in the same game. On 21 January 2021, Smith joined Motherwell on loan until the end of the season.

On 7 July 2021, Smith signed a two-year deal with Leyton Orient after transferring for an undisclosed fee. he moved on loan to Exeter City on 1 September 2022. On 22 October, Smith confirmed that the loan had ended early as he had struggled to settle in Devon. On 7 February 2023, he joined Barnet on loan until the end of the season.

In June 2023 it was announced that he would sign for Sutton United on 1 July 2023. In May 2024, the club confirmed that following relegation, Smith had rejected a new contract offer and would depart the club.

On 27 June 2024, Smith rejoined Swindon Town on a permanent deal. In August 2025 he suffered an ACL injury.

== Personal life ==
In March 2018, Smith released a statement stating that he was seeking help for mental health and gambling addiction problems.

== Career statistics ==
As of match played 3 May 2025

Appearances and goals by club, season and competition
| Club | Season | League | | | National Cup | | League Cup | | Other | | Total | |
| Club | Season | Division | Apps | Goals | Apps | Goals | Apps | Goals | Apps | Goals | Apps | Goals |
|---|---|---|---|---|---|---|---|---|---|---|---|---|
| Folkestone Invicta | 2015–16 | IL – Division One South | 19 | 13 | 0 | 0 | 0 | 0 | 0 | 0 | 19 | 13 |
| Millwall | 2016–17 | League One | 9 | 1 | 1 | 3 | 0 | 0 | 2 (Note: Appearance(s) in the EFL Trophy.) | 2 | 12 | 6 |
| Millwall | 2017–18 | Championship | 0 | 0 | 0 | 0 | 0 | 0 | 0 | 0 | 0 | 0 |
| Millwall | Total | | 9 | 1 | 1 | 3 | 0 | 0 | 2 | 2 | 12 | 6 |
| Swindon Town (loan) | 2017–18 | League Two | 14 | 2 | 2 | 1 | 1 | 0 | 2 | 0 | 19 | 3 |
| Macclesfield Town | 2018–19 | League Two | 39 | 9 | 1 | 0 | 3 | 1 | 4 | 0 | 47 | 10 |
| Northampton Town | 2019–20 | League Two | 19 | 4 | 2 | 2 | 1 | 0 | 7 (Note: 4 appearances and 1 goal in the EFL Trophy, 3 appearances in the play-offs.) | 1 | 29 | 7 |
| Northampton Town | 2020–21 | League One | 16 | 3 | 1 | 0 | 1 | 1 | 3 | 0 | 21 | 4 |
| Northampton Town | Total | | 35 | 7 | 3 | 2 | 2 | 1 | 10 | 1 | 50 | 11 |
| Motherwell (loan) | 2020–21 | Scottish Premiership | 5 | 0 | 0 | 0 | 0 | 0 | 0 | 0 | 5 | 0 |
| Leyton Orient | 2021–22 | League Two | 41 | 13 | 3 | 2 | 0 | 0 | 1 | 0 | 45 | 15 |
| Leyton Orient | 2022–23 | League Two | 8 | 0 | 0 | 0 | 1 | 0 | 1 | 0 | 10 | 0 |
| Leyton Orient | Total | | 49 | 13 | 3 | 2 | 1 | 0 | 1 | 0 | 55 | 15 |
| Exeter City (loan) | 2022–23 | League One | 5 | 0 | 0 | 0 | 0 | 0 | 0 | 0 | 5 | 0 |
| Barnet (loan) | 2022–23 | National League | 11 | 7 | 0 | 0 | 0 | 0 | 4 (Note: Three appearances and two goals in the FA Trophy, one appearance in the National League playoffs) | 2 | 15 | 9 |
| Sutton United | 2023–24 | League Two | 37 | 11 | 2 | 2 | 2 | 1 | 1 | 0 | 42 | 14 |
| Swindon Town | 2024–25 | League Two | 39 | 15 | 2 | 0 | 1 | 1 | 2 | 1 | 44 | 17 |
| Career total | | | 261 | 78 | 14 | 10 | 10 | 4 | 27 | 6 | 312 | 98 |

== Honours ==
Northampton Town

- EFL League Two play-offs: 2020

Leyton Orient

- EFL League Two: 2022–23
