= 2019–20 Swindon Town F.C. season =

Swindon Town
2019–20 season
- Chairman: Lee Power
- Manager: Richie Wellens
- Stadium: County Ground
- League Two: 1st (champions)
- FA Cup: First round (eliminated by Cheltenham Town)
- EFL Cup: First round (eliminated by Colchester United)
- EFL Trophy: Group stage
- Top goalscorer: League: Eoin Doyle (25 goals); All: Eoin Doyle (25 goals)
- Highest home attendance: 13,095 vs Exeter City (1 February 2020)
- Lowest home attendance: 1,199 vs Plymouth Argyle (8 October 2019)
- Average home league attendance: 7,787
Home colours	Away colours	Third colours

The 2019–20 Swindon Town F.C. season was the club's 141st season in their existence, and third consecutive in League Two. The season covered the period from 1 July 2019 through to 30 June 2020.

== Players ==
=== First Team Squad ===
As of 2 July 2019

No.	Name	Nat	Position	Since	Date of birth (age)	Signed from	Games	Goals
Goalkeepers
12	Will Henry	(England)	GK	2015	6 July 1998 (age 28)	Academy	10	0
23	Luke McCormick	(England)	GK	2018	15 August 1983 (age 43)	(England) Plymouth Argyle	10	0
Defenders
3	Zeki Fryers	(England)	LB/CB	2019	9 September 1992 (age 34)	Barnsley	-	-
6	Mathieu Baudry	(France)	CB	2019	24 February 1988 (age 38)	Milton Keynes Dons	-	-
24	Rob Hunt	(England)	RB/LB	2019	7 July 1995 (age 31)	Oldham	-	-
25	Joe Romanski	(England)	CB	2017	3 February 2000 (age 26)	Academy	9	1
26	Dion Conroy	(England)	CB/DM	2017	11 December 1995 (age 30)	(England) Chelsea	28	0
-	Tyler Reid	(England)	RB	2019	2 September 1997 (age 29)	Swansea	-	-
Midfielders
3	Michael Doughty	(Wales)	CM/LM/LB	2018	20 November 1992 (age 33)	(England) Peterborough United	49	15
7	Jermaine McGlashan	(England)	RM/LM/AM	2018	14 October 1988 (age 37)	(England) Southend United	18	0
14	Ellis Iandolo	(England)	LM/LB/CM	2015	22 August 1997 (age 29)	(England) Maidstone United	54	2
20	Toumani Diagouraga	(France)	DM/CM	2018	9 June 1987 (age 39)	(England) Fleetwood Town	21	0
Forwards
10	Keshi Anderson	(England)	SS/LW/RW	2018	6 April 1995 (age 31)	(England) Crystal Palace	59	7
22	Kaiyne Woolery	(England)	SS/RW/LW	2017	11 January 1995 (age 31)	(England) Wigan Athletic	47	6
24	Scott Twine	(England)	CF	2016	14 July 1999 (age 27)	Academy	12	0

== Transfers ==
=== Transfers in ===
Date	Position	Nationality	Name	From	Fee	Ref.
1 July 2019	CB	(France)	Mathieu Baudry	(England) Milton Keynes Dons	Free transfer	
1 July 2019	LB	(England)	Zeki Fryers	(England) Barnsley	Free transfer	
1 July 2019	RB	(England)	Rob Hunt	(England) Oldham Athletic	Free transfer	
1 July 2019	RB	(England)	Tyler Reid	(Wales) Swansea City	Free transfer	
26 July 2019	DM	(Australia)	Jordan Lyden	(England) Aston Villa	Free transfer	
30 July 2019	LW	(Wales)	Lloyd Isgrove	(England) Barnsley	Free transfer	
4 October 2019	CB	(Democratic Republic of the Congo)	Gabriel Zakuani	(England) Gillingham	Free transfer	
12 October 2019	LB	(Wales)	Dion Donohue	(England) Mansfield Town	Free transfer	
16 November 2019	RB	(Scotland)	Paul Caddis	(England) Bradford City	Free transfer	
6 January 2020	CM	(England)	Anthony Grant	(England) Shrewsbury Town	Undisclosed	
22 January 2020	CF	(Barbados)	Hallam Hope	(England) Carlisle United	Undisclosed	
30 January 2020	CF	(Republic of Ireland)	Eoin Doyle	(England) Bradford City	Undisclosed	
31 January 2020	CM	(England)	Matt Palmer	(England) Rotherham United	Free transfer	

=== Loans in ===
Date from	Position	Nationality	Name	From	Date until	Ref.
1 July 2019	CM	(England)	Adam May	(England) Portsmouth	11 February 2020	
1 July 2019	CF	(England)	Jerry Yates	(England) Rotherham United	22 January 2020	
3 July 2019	CB	(Northern Ireland)	Daniel Ballard	(England) Arsenal	31 May 2020	
30 July 2019	RW	(England)	Diallang Jaiyesimi	(England) Norwich City	30 June 2020	
16 August 2019	CF	(Republic of Ireland)	Eoin Doyle	(England) Bradford City	January 2020	
2 September 2019	GK	(Germany)	Steven Benda	(Wales) Swansea City	30 June 2020	
2 September 2019	CM	(England)	Anthony Grant	(England) Shrewsbury Town	1 January 2020	
13 January 2020	CB	(England)	Rarmani Edmonds-Green	(England) Huddersfield Town	30 June 2020	
28 January 2020	CF	(Zimbabwe)	Admiral Muskwe	(England) Leicester City	30 June 2020	
29 January 2020	CF	(England)	Jerry Yates	(England) Rotherham United	30 June 2020	

=== Loans out ===
Date from	Position	Nationality	Name	To	Date until	Ref.
25 July 2019	DF	(England)	Luke Haines	(England) Chippenham Town		
27 July 2019	MF	(England)	Jacob Bancroft	(England) Salisbury	January 2020	
16 August 2019	RM	(England)	Jermaine McGlashan	(England) Chesterfield	1 January 2020	
6 September 2019	MF	(England)	Ralph Graham	(England) Highworth Town	October 2019	
13 September 2019	GK	(England)	Will Henry	(England) Chippenham Town	October 2019	
17 October 2019	GK	(England)	Archie Matthews	(England) Thatcham Town	November 2019	
20 October 2019	DM	(Australia)	Cameron McGilp	(England) Hungerford Town	November 2019	
7 November 2019	GK	(England)	Will Henry	(England) Gloucester City	December 2019	
21 November 2019	RB	(England)	Tyler Reid	(Wales) Wrexham	December 2019	
4 January 2020	GK	(England)	Will Henry	(England) Hereford	February 2020	

=== Transfers out ===
Date	Position	Nationality	Name	To	Fee	Ref.
1 July 2019	CM	(England)	James Dunne	(England) Barnet	Released	
1 July 2019	SS	(England)	Jordan Edwards	(England) Basingstoke Town	Released	
1 July 2019	RB	(England)	Kyle Knoyle	(England) Cambridge United	Free transfer	
1 July 2019	CB	(England)	Olly Lancashire	(England) Crewe Alexandra	Released	
1 July 2019	CM	(England)	Jak McCourt	(England) Macclesfield Town	Released	
1 July 2019	CF	(England)	Sol Pryce	Free agent	Released	
1 July 2019	CF	(England)	Marc Richards	(England) Cambridge United	Released	
1 July 2019	CB	(Scotland)	Chris Robertson	(England) Ilkeston Town	Released	
1 July 2019	CM	(England)	Martin Smith	(England) Salford City	Released	
1 July 2019	LM	(England)	Matthew Taylor	Retired		
1 July 2019	GK	(Chile)	Lawrence Vigouroux	(Chile) Everton de Viña del Mar	Released	
1 July 2019	MF	(Scotland)	Jordan Young	(England) Coventry City	Released	
17 July 2019	CF	(England)	Elliott Dugan	(Sweden) Ytterhogdal	Undisclosed	
2 January 2020	DM	(France)	Toumani Diagouraga	(England) Morecambe	Free transfer	
11 January 2020	MF	(England)	Markus ifill	(England) Brighton & Hove Albion	Undisclosed	

== Non-Playing Staff ==
Position	Name
First-Team Manager	(England) Richie Wellens
First-Team Assistant Manager	(Republic of Ireland) Noel Hunt
First-Team Coach	(Scotland) Tommy Wright
First Team Goalkeeping Coach	(England) Steve Mildenhall
First-Team Physio	(England) Tom Holmes
First Team Analyst	(England) John Shannon
First Team Kit Men	(England) Steve Hooper/ Jonah Isaacs
Director of Football	(England) Paul Jewell
Academy Director	(Republic of Ireland) Seamus Brady
Academy Manager	(Republic of Ireland) Alan McLoughlin
Academy Coach	(England) David Farrell

== Pre-season ==
On 26 May, The Robins announced their pre-season schedule.

2 July 2019 Friendly	Brimscombe & Thrupp	0–6	Swindon Town	Brimscombe and Thrupp
19:30 BST		Report	Anderson 5'; Yates 9'; Randall (Trialist) 60'; Ngakoutou (Trialist) 64' 71'; D'Ath (Trialist) 75'	Stadium: The Meadow

5 July 2019 Friendly	Swindon Supermarine	0–3	Swindon Town	South Marston
19:30 BST		Report	Randall (Trialist) 41'; Doughty 70' (pen.); Woolery 87'	Stadium: Hunts Copse

11 July 2019 Friendly	Everton U23s	0–1	Swindon Town	Cartagena, Spain
11:00 CEST		Report	Iandolo 87'	Stadium: La Manga Club Football Stadium

16 July 2019 Friendly	Hungerford Town	1–4	Swindon Town	Hungerford
19:30 BST	Akers 10'	Report	Yates 26'; Iandolo 30'; Graham 67'; Anderson 67'	Stadium: Bulpit Lane; Attendance: 419

16 July 2019 Friendly	Salisbury	1–6	Swindon Town	Salisbury
19:45 BST	Harfield 70'	Report	Woolery 22'; Thomas-Asante (Trialist) 38', 39'; Twine 60'; Broadbent 76'; Bancroft 81'	Stadium: Raymond McEnhill Stadium; Attendance: 439; Referee: Roger East

19 July 2019 Friendly	Birmingham City	6–1	Swindon Town	Birmingham
13:00 BST	Crowley 5'; Vassell 19'; Bailey 29'; Gardner 33'; Bellingham 74', 84'		Doughty 65'	Stadium: Wast Hills

23 July 2019 Friendly	Swindon Town	1–1	Manchester United U23s	Swindon
19:30 BST	Trialist 10'	Report	Levitt 70' (pen.)	Stadium: The County Ground

27 July 2019 Friendly	Swindon Town	0–2	Coventry City	Swindon
15:00 BST		Report	Bakayoko 58'; Biamou 90'	Stadium: The County Ground

30 July 2019 Friendly	Melksham Town	0–6	Swindon Town	Melksham
19:30 BST	0		6	Stadium: Oakfield Stadium; Referee: ?

== Competitions ==
=== League Two ===
==== League table ====
Pos	Team	Pld	W	D	L	GF	GA	GD	Pts	PPG	Promotion, qualification or relegation
1	Swindon Town (C, P)	36	21	6	9	62	39	+23	69	1.92	Promotion to EFL League One
2	Crewe Alexandra (P)	37	20	9	8	67	43	+24	69	1.86	Promotion to EFL League One
3	Plymouth Argyle (P)	37	20	8	9	61	39	+22	68	1.84	Promotion to EFL League One
4	Cheltenham Town	36	17	13	6	52	27	+25	64	1.78	Qualification for League Two play-offs (Note: Four teams play for one spot and promotion to EFL League One.)
5	Exeter City	37	18	11	8	53	43	+10	65	1.76	Qualification for League Two play-offs
6	Colchester United	37	15	13	9	52	37	+15	58	1.57	Qualification for League Two play-offs
7	Northampton Town (O, P)	37	17	7	13	54	40	+14	58	1.57	Qualification for League Two play-offs
8	Port Vale	37	14	15	8	50	44	+6	57	1.54	

Source: EFL Official Website
Rules for classification: 1) Points per game; 2) Goal difference; 3) Number of goals scored; 4) Head-to-head results; 5) Wins; 6) Away goals; 7) Penalty points (sec 9.5); 8) 12-point sending off offences
(C) Champions; (O) Play-off winners; (P) Promoted

==== Results summary ====
Overall								Home						Away					
Pld	W	D	L	GF	GA	GD	Pts	W	D	L	GF	GA	GD	W	D	L	GF	GA	GD
36	21	6	9	62	39	+23	69	13	2	4	34	17	+17	8	4	5	28	22	+6

Last updated: 7 March 2020.
Source: BBC

==== Results by matchday ====
Matchday	1	2	3	4	5	6	7	8	9	10	11	12	13	14	15	16	17	18	19	20	21	22	23	24	25	26	27	28	29	30	31	32	33	34	35	36
Ground	A	H	A	H	A	H	A	H	H	A	H	A	H	A	H	A	H	A	H	A	H	A	H	A	A	H	H	A	H	A	H	A	A	H	H	H
Result	W	W	D	L	D	W	W	W	L	W	L	L	D	L	W	W	W	W	W	W	W	D	W	L	W	D	W	L	W	L	W	D	W	W	W	L
Position	4	2	1	7	10	5	4	2	4	4	5	7	7	7	7	5	3	1	1	1	1	1	1	1	1	1	1	1	1	1	1	1	1	1	1	2

Updated to match(es) played on 7 March 2020. Source: 11v11
A = Away; H = Home; W = Win; D = Draw; L = Loss

==== Matches ====
On Thursday, 20 June 2019, the EFL League Two fixtures were revealed.

3 August 2019 1	Scunthorpe United	0–2	Swindon Town	Scunthorpe
15:00 BST	McGahey (yellow card) 30'; Butler (yellow card) 83'	Report	Yates 59'; Anderson 70'	Stadium: Glanford Park; Attendance: 4,135; Referee: Will Finnie

10 August 2019 2	Swindon Town	3–2	Carlisle United	Swindon
15:00 BST	Yates 56'; Fryers 70'; Woolery 90'	Report	Olomola 52'; Sagaf 90+2'; Carroll (red card) 83'	Stadium: County Ground; Attendance: 7,024; Referee: Nick Kinseley

17 August 2019 3	Exeter City	1–1	Swindon Town	Exeter
15:00 BST	Taylor (yellow card) 45'; Jay 72'	Report	Baudry (yellow card) 39'; Doyle 88'; Doughty (yellow card) 90+4'	Stadium: St James Park; Attendance: 5,435; Referee: Christopher Sarginson

20 August 2019 4	Swindon Town	0–1	Northampton Town	Swindon
19:45 BST	Baudry (yellow card) 4'; May (yellow card) 65'	Report	Lines (yellow card) 54'; Williams 67'; Turnbull (yellow card) 72'	Stadium: The County Ground; Attendance: 7,203; Referee: Craig Hicks

24 August 2019 5	Cheltenham Town	2–2	Swindon Town	Cheltenham
15:00 BST	Hussey 19'; Broom (yellow card) 25'; Varney 41'	Report	Doyle 6', 33'; Isgrove (yellow card) 19'; Doughty (red card) 71'; Lyden (yellow card) 78'	Stadium: Whaddon Road; Attendance: 4,401; Referee: Trevor Kettle

31 August 2019 6	Swindon Town	3–1	Morecambe	Swindon
15:00 BST	Doyle 5', 21'; Yates 17'	Report	Alessandra 13'	Stadium: The County Ground; Attendance: 6,877; Referee: Darren Drysdale

7 September 2019 7	Leyton Orient	1–3	Swindon Town	Leyton
15:00 BST	Angol (yellow card) 38'; Maguire-Drew 74'; Gorman (yellow card) 77'; Ling (yellow card) 90+3'	Report	Anderson 23' (yellow card) 87'; Widdowson 43' (o.g.); Yates 45+2'	Stadium: Brisbane Road; Attendance: 7,042; Referee: Kevin Johnson

14 September 2019 8	Swindon Town	3–0	Macclesfield Town	Swindon
15:00 BST	Anderson 37'; Doyle 45+1', 76'	Report	Welch-Hayes (yellow card) 55'; O'Keeffe (yellow card) 90+4'	Stadium: The County Ground; Attendance: 7,055; Referee: Leigh Doughty

17 September 2019 9	Swindon Town	0–3	Colchester United	Swindon
19:45 BST	Baudry (yellow card) 24'; Iandolo (yellow card) 70'	Report	Sarpong-Wiredu (yellow card) 18'; Eastman 45+1'; Robinson 55', 75'	Stadium: The County Ground; Attendance: 6,634; Referee: Andy Woolmer

21 September 2019 10	Cambridge United	0–1	Swindon Town	Cambridge
15:00 BST	Lambe (yellow card) 40'	Report	Yates 27'; Conroy (yellow card) 60'; Isgrove (yellow card) 63'; Doyle (yellow card) 90+5'	Stadium: Abbey Stadium; Attendance: 4,443; Referee: Peter Wright

28 September 2019 11	Swindon Town	0–2	Newport County	Swindon
15:00 BST		Report	O'Brien 38' (yellow card) 55'; Matt 82'	Stadium: County Ground; Attendance: 7,843; Referee: David Rock

5 October 2019 12	Bradford City	2–1	Swindon Town	Bradford
15:00 BST	Akpan 69'; McCartan 79'; Mellor (yellow card) 90'	Report	Lyden (yellow card) 21'; Anderson (yellow card) 26'; Iandolo (yellow card) 43'; Yates 74'	Stadium: Valley Parade; Attendance: 14,136; Referee: Tom Nield

12 October 2019 13	Swindon Town	1–1	Plymouth Argyle	Swindon
15:00 BST	Doyle 45+2' (yellow card) 89'; Grant (yellow card) 49'; Baudry (yellow card) 56'; Lyden (yellow card) 67'	Report	Riley (yellow card) 42'; Grant 76'; Canavan (yellow card) 79'; Mayor (yellow card) 84'	Stadium: County Ground; Attendance: 9,548; Referee: Rob Lewis

19 October 2019 14	Crewe Alexandra	3–1	Swindon Town	Crewe
15:00 BST	Porter 59', 90'; Kirk 90+4'	Report	Doyle 37' (yellow card) 83'; Woolery (yellow card) 76'; Rose (yellow card) 78'; Lyden (yellow card) 80'	Stadium: Gresty Road; Attendance: 4,792; Referee: Marc Edwards

22 October 2019 15	Swindon Town	1–0	Stevenage	Swindon
19:45 BST	Grant (yellow card) 12'; Fryers (yellow card) 61'; Doyle 90' (yellow card) 90+2'	Report	Parrett (yellow card) 79'; Denton (yellow card) 90'; Farman (yellow card) 90+4'	Stadium: County Ground; Referee: Alan Young

26 October 2019 16	Crawley Town	0–4	Swindon Town	Crawley
15:00 BST	Tunnicliffe (yellow card) 47'; Dallison (yellow card) 58'; Grego-Cox (yellow card) 69'; Allarakhia (yellow card) 81'	Report	Doyle 5', 44', 61'; Grant (yellow card) 66'; Yates 87'	Stadium: Broadfield Stadium; Attendance: 2,601; Referee: Michael Salisbury

2 November 2019 17	Swindon Town	2–1	Walsall	Swindon
15:00 GMT	Doyle 5'; Jaiyesimi 47'	Report	Gaffney 54'	Stadium: County Ground; Attendance: 7,014; Referee: Josh Smith

16 November 2019 18	Salford City	2–3	Swindon Town	Salford
15:00 GMT	Rooney 4' (pen.), 90+5' (pen.); Burgess (yellow card) 26'; Dieseruvwe (yellow card) 45+7'	Report	Doyle 10', 54' (pen.); Yates 78'	Stadium: Moor Lane; Attendance: 3,509; Referee: Leigh Doughty

23 November 2019 19	Swindon Town	1–0	Mansfield Town	Swindon
15:00 GMT	Doyle 23'	Report	Preston (yellow card) 15'; Smith (yellow card) 27'	Stadium: County Ground; Attendance: 6,741; Referee: Nick Kinseley

7 December 2019 20	Grimsby Town	0–3	Swindon Town	Cleethorpes
15:00 GMT	Hewitt (yellow card) 76'	Report	Doyle 10'; Yates 24', 52'	Stadium: Blundell Park; Attendance: 3,723; Referee: Peter Wright

14 December 2019 21	Swindon Town	2–0	Oldham Athletic	Swindon
15:00 GMT	Woolery 45+1'; Baudry (yellow card) 66'; Doyle 85'	Report	Iacovitti (yellow card) 32'; Mills (yellow card) 90+4'	Stadium: County Ground; Attendance: 6,825; Referee: David Rock

21 December 2019 22	Forest Green Rovers	2–2	Swindon Town	Nailsworth
15:00 GMT	Mills 55', 90+5'; Winchester (yellow card) 76'	Report	Baudry (yellow card) 9'; Doyle 16', 35'	Stadium: The New Lawn; Attendance: 4,216; Referee: Robert Lewis

26 December 2019 23	Swindon Town	4–0	Cambridge United	Swindon
15:00 GMT	Doyle 5' (pen.); Anderson 40', 45+1', 66'; Grant (yellow card) 48'; Iandolo (yellow card) 82'	Report	Roles (yellow card) 5'; Taft (yellow card) 22'; Lewis (yellow card) 48'	Stadium: County Ground; Attendance: 8,211; Referee: Josh Smith

29 December 2019 24	Port Vale	2–0	Swindon Town	Burslem
15:00 GMT	Legge (yellow card) 4'; Burgess 13'; Gibbons (yellow card) 45+5'; Taylor 52'	Report		Stadium: Vale Park; Attendance: 5,495; Referee: Scott Oldham

1 January 2020 25	Plymouth Argyle	1–2	Swindon Town	Plymouth
15:00 GMT	Telford 22'; Edwards (yellow card) 45+2'	Report	Grant (yellow card) 15'; Hunt (yellow card) 25'; Jaiyesimi 35'; Lyden (yellow card) 48'; Doyle 77' (yellow card) 78'; Yates (yellow card) 79'	Stadium: Home Park; Attendance: 15,062; Referee: Kevin Johnson

4 January 2020 26	Swindon Town	1–1	Bradford City	Swindon
15:00 GMT	Yates 11' (pen.); Rose (yellow card) 42'; Jaiyesimi (yellow card) 61'; Hunt (yellow card) 73'; Lyden (red card) 90+3'; Woolery (yellow card) 90+6'	Report	Reeves (yellow card) 13'; McCartan 89' (yellow card) 89'	Stadium: County Ground; Attendance: 8,407; Referee: Darren Drysdale

11 January 2020 27	Swindon Town	3–1	Crewe Alexandra	Swindon
15:00 GMT	Hunt 32'; Yates 69'; Rose 72'; Caddis (yellow card) 80'; Woolery (yellow card) 90+5'	Report	Anene 61'	Stadium: County Ground; Attendance: 7,601; Referee: Darren Handley

18 January 2020 28	Newport County	2–0	Swindon Town	Newport
15:00 GMT	Sheehan 1'; Matt 49' (yellow card) 79'; King (yellow card) 90'	Report	Grant (yellow card) 28'; Jaiyesimi (yellow card) 42'; Yates (yellow card) 90+1'	Stadium: Rodney Parade; Attendance: 4,981; Referee: Christopher Pollard

25 January 2020 29	Swindon Town	3–0	Port Vale	Swindon
15:00 GMT	Legge 41' (o.g.); Hope 45'; Doughty 60' (yellow card) 90+1'	Report	Atkinson (yellow card) 34'; Joyce (yellow card) 42'; Brisley (yellow card) 85'; Legge (yellow card) 87'	Stadium: County Ground; Attendance: 7,343; Referee: Craig Hicks

28 January 2020 30	Colchester United	3–1	Swindon Town	Colchester
19:45 GMT	Comley (yellow card) 35'; Norris 74'; Robinson 85', 89'	Report	Jaiyesimi 48'; Edmonds-Green (yellow card) 70'; Hunt (yellow card) 73'; Baudry (yellow card) 88'	Stadium: Colchester Community Stadium; Attendance: 3,258; Referee: Gavin Ward

1 February 2020 31	Swindon Town	2–1	Exeter City	Swindon
15:00 GMT	Doyle 20'; Hope 46'; Doughty (yellow card) 63'	Report	Williams 34'; Bowman (yellow card) 36'	Stadium: The County Ground; Attendance: 13,095; Referee: Kevin Johnson

8 February 2020 32	Carlisle United	1–1	Swindon Town	Carlisle
15:00 GMT	Hayden 62'	Report	Edmonds-Green 11'	Stadium: Brunton Park; Attendance: 4,620; Referee: Graham Salisbury

11 February 2020 33	Northampton Town	0–1	Swindon Town	Northampton
19:45 GMT	Goode (yellow card) 59'; Oliver (yellow card) 63'; Jones (yellow card) 68'	Report	Doyle (yellow card) 70'; Lyden 77'	Stadium: Sixfields Stadium; Attendance: 5,759; Referee: James Adcock

15 February 2020	Swindon Town	v	Scunthorpe United	Swindon
15:00 GMT		Report		Stadium: County Ground
Note: Match was postponed due to adverse weather conditions.

22 February 2020 34	Swindon Town	3–1	Grimsby Town	Swindon
15:00 GMT	Grant (yellow card) 3'; Yates 46'; Jaiyesimi 49'; Hendrie 57' (o.g.)	Report	Hanson 59'; Clarke (yellow card) 66'; Glennon (yellow card) 70'	Stadium: County Ground; Attendance: 8,180; Referee: Sam Purkiss

29 February 2020	Mansfield Town	v	Swindon Town	Mansfield
15:00 GMT		Report		Stadium: Field Mill
Note: Match was postponed due to a waterlogged pitch.

3 March 2020 35	Swindon Town	2–0	Scunthorpe United	Swindon
19:45 GMT	Doyle 41', 77'	Report	Rowe (yellow card) 4'; Perch (yellow card) 72'	Stadium: County Ground; Attendance: 7,583; Referee: Peter Wright

7 March 2020 36	Swindon Town	0–2	Forest Green Rovers	Swindon
15:00 GMT	Doughty (yellow card) 22'; Grant (yellow card) 36'	Report	Stevens 5'; Dawson (yellow card) 30'; Adams 50' (yellow card) 65'; McGinley (yellow card) 73'	Stadium: County Ground; Attendance: 9,257; Referee: Craig Hicks

14 March 2020	Oldham Athletic	v	Swindon Town	Oldham
15:00 GMT				Stadium: Boundary Park
Note: Season was suspended until 3 April 2020, due to the COVID-19 pandemic.

17 March 2020	Stevenage	v	Swindon Town	Stevenage
19:45 GMT				Stadium: Broadhall Way
Note: Season was suspended until 3 April 2020, due to the COVID-19 pandemic.

21 March 2020	Swindon Town	v	Crawley Town	Swindon
15:00 GMT				Stadium: County Ground
Note: Season was suspended until 3 April 2020, due to the COVID-19 pandemic.

24 March 2020	Swindon Town	v	Salford City	Swindon
19:45 GMT				Stadium: County Ground
Note: Season was suspended until 3 April 2020, due to the COVID-19 pandemic.

28 March 2020	Walsall	v	Swindon Town	Bescot
15:00 GMT				Stadium: Bescot Stadium
Note: Season was suspended until 3 April 2020, due to the COVID-19 pandemic.

10 April 2020	Swindon Town	v	Cheltenham Town	Swindon
15:00 BST				Stadium: County Ground
Note: On 3 April, the English Football League decided to postpone all football until safe to do so due to the COVID-19 pandemic.

13 April 2020	Morecambe	v	Swindon Town	Morecambe
13:00 BST				Stadium: Globe Arena
Note: On 3 April, the English Football League decided to postpone all football until safe to do so due to the COVID-19 pandemic.

18 April 2020	Swindon Town	v	Leyton Orient	Swindon
15:00 BST				Stadium: County Ground
Note: On 3 April, the English Football League decided to postpone all football until safe to do so due to the COVID-19 pandemic.

25 April 2020	Macclesfield Town	v	Swindon Town	Macclesfield
15:00 BST				Stadium: Moss Rose
Note: On 3 April, the English Football League decided to postpone all football until safe to do so due to the COVID-19 pandemic.

=== FA Cup ===
The first round draw was made on 21 October 2019.

9 November 2019 First round	Cheltenham Town	1–1	Swindon Town	Cheltenham
15:00 GMT	Thomas (yellow card) 57'; Boyle (yellow card) 76'; Addai 90+3'; Long (yellow card) 90+5'	Report	Hunt (yellow card) 80'; Yates 90+1'	Stadium: Whaddon Road; Attendance: 3,456; Referee: Scott Oldham

19 November 2019 First round replay	Swindon Town	0–1	Cheltenham Town	Swindon
19:45 GMT	Doughty (penalty missed) 3'; Jaiyesimi (yellow card) 71'	Report	Raglan (yellow card) 38'; Addai 50'; Doyle-Hayes (yellow card) 71'; Lloyd (yellow card) 84'	Stadium: County Ground; Referee: Darren Drysdale

=== EFL Cup ===
The first round draw was made on 20 June.

13 August 2019 First round	Colchester United	3–0	Swindon Town	Colchester
19:45 BST	Eastman 77'; Senior 90+2'; Comley 90+7'; Prosser (yellow card) 48'; Gambin (yellow card) 58'; Bramall (red card) 62'	Report	Hunt (yellow card) 24'; Broadbent (yellow card) 45+3'; Doughty (yellow card) 71'; Yates (red card) 83'	Stadium: Colchester Community Stadium; Attendance: 1,595; Referee: Charles Breakspear

=== EFL Trophy ===
On 9 July 2019, the pre-determined group stage draw was announced with Invited clubs to be drawn on 12 July 2019.

Pos	Div	Team	Pld	W	PW	PL	L	GF	GA	GD	Pts	Qualification
1	L1	Bristol Rovers	3	2	0	1	0	4	2	+2	7	Advance to Round 2
2	ACA	Chelsea U21	3	2	0	0	1	5	4	+1	6	Advance to Round 2
3	L2	Plymouth Argyle	3	1	1	0	1	4	2	+2	5	
4	L2	Swindon Town	3	0	0	0	3	2	7	−5	0	

Source: EFL.com

6 August 2019 Group stage	Swindon Town	2–3	Chelsea U21	County Ground
19:45 BST	Ballard 19'; Hunt (yellow card) 29'; May 46'; Reid (yellow card) 64'; Diagouraga (yellow card) 90+4'	Report	Anjorin 11', 16'; Brown 60'; Uwakwe (yellow card) 77'	Attendance: 1,995; Referee: Allan Young

8 October 2019 Group stage	Swindon Town	0–3	Plymouth Argyle	County Ground
19:45	Zakuani (yellow card) 26'	Report	Rudden 15' (yellow card) 45'; Grant 36'; Riley 66'	Attendance: 1,199; Referee: Chris Pollard

13 November 2019 Group stage	Bristol Rovers	1–0	Swindon Town	Horfield
19:45 GMT	Little 73'; Clarke (yellow card) 90+2'	Report	Broadbent (yellow card) 75'; Sanokho (yellow card) 80'	Stadium: Memorial Stadium; Attendance: 1,083; Referee: Ollie Yates
