= Kellan Gordon =

English footballer

Personal information
- Full name: Kellan Sheene Gordon
- Date of birth: 25 December 1997 (age 28)
- Place of birth: Burton upon Trent, England
- Height: 5 ft 10 in (1.79 m)
- Position: Wing-back

Team information
- Current team: Crawley Town
- Number: 2

Youth career
- –2014: Stoke City
- 2014–2017: Derby County

Senior career*
Years	Team	Apps	(Gls)
2017–2019	Derby County	0	(0)
2017–2018	→ Swindon Town (loan)	26	(3)
2018–2019	→ Lincoln City (loan)	6	(2)
2019–2023	Mansfield Town	73	(2)
2023–2024	Crawley Town	48	(1)
2024–2026	Notts County	44	(1)
2026–	Crawley Town	23	(1)
- * Club domestic league appearances and goals as of 14:36, 18 November 2026 (UTC)

Kellan Gordon (born 25 December 1997) is an English professional footballer who plays as a wing-back for Crawley Town.

== Early life ==
Born in Burton upon Trent, Gordon hails from the nearby village of Branston.

== Club career ==
=== Derby County ===
Having joined Derby County's academy aged 14 after being released by Stoke City, Gordon signed his first professional deal in 2015 with Derby, then in the Championship. On 22 August 2017, Gordon made his debut for Derby during their EFL Cup tie against Grimsby Town, replacing Mason Bennett in the 75th minute in their 1–0 victory.

On 31 August 2017, Gordon joined League Two club Swindon Town on a season-long loan along with teammate Timi Elšnik. On 9 September 2017, Gordon replaced Keshi Anderson to make his Swindon debut during their 3–0 away victory over Luton Town. On 28 October 2017, Gordon scored his first professional goal during Swindon's 3–0 away victory over Port Vale, netting Town's third in the 85th minute. Gordon went on to score three more times in all competitions before returning to Derby in April after sustaining a dislocated shoulder.

On 28 August 2018, Gordon joined League Two Lincoln City on loan until January 2019.

=== Mansfield Town ===
On 25 July 2019, Gordon joined Mansfield Town on a two-year deal for an undisclosed fee. On 5 February 2021, Gordon signed a new two-and-a-half-year contract with the club.

=== Crawley Town ===
On 31 January 2023, Gordon joined Crawley Town on an 18-month deal for an undisclosed fee.

=== Notts County ===
On 12 July 2024, Gordon returned to League Two, joining Notts County on a two-year contract.

On 16 January 2026, Gordon rejoined Crawley Town on an 18-month deal for an undisclosed fee.

== Personal life ==
Gordon's younger brother Kaide Gordon is a professional footballer for Liverpool.

== Career statistics ==
As of match played 8 November 2026

Appearances and goals by club, season and competition
Club	Season	League			FA Cup		EFL Cup		Other		Total	
Club	Season	Division	Apps	Goals	Apps	Goals	Apps	Goals	Apps	Goals	Apps	Goals
Derby County	2017–18	Championship	0	0	0	0	1	0	0	0	1	0
Derby County	2018–19	Championship	0	0	0	0	0	0	0	0	0	0
Derby County	Total		0	0	0	0	1	0	0	0	1	0
Swindon Town (loan)	2017–18	League Two	26	3	2	0	0	0	3 (Note: Appearances in EFL Trophy)	1	31	4
Lincoln City (loan)	2018–19	League Two	6	2	0	0	0	0	4	0	10	2
Mansfield Town	2019–20	League Two	18	1	2	0	1	0	0	0	21	1
Mansfield Town	2020–21	League Two	32	0	2	0	0	0	3	0	37	0
Mansfield Town	2021–22	League Two	7	0	0	0	1	0	0	0	8	0
Mansfield Town	2022–23	League Two	16	1	2	0	1	0	3	0	22	1
Mansfield Town	Total		73	2	6	0	3	0	6	0	88	2
Crawley Town	2022–23	League Two	15	0	0	0	0	0	0	0	15	0
Crawley Town	2023–24	League Two	33	1	1	0	0	0	1	0	35	1
Crawley Town	Total		48	1	1	0	0	0	0	0	50	0
Notts County	2024–25	League Two	30	0	2	0	0	0	1	1	33	1
Notts County	2025–26	League Two	14	1	0	0	1	0	0	0	15	1
Notts County	Total		44	1	2	0	1	0	1	1	48	2
Crawley Town	2025–26	League Two	14	1	0	0	0	0	0	0	14	1
Crawley Town	2026–27	League Two	9	0	1	0	2	0	0	0	12	0
Crawley Town	Total		23	1	1	0	2	0	0	0	26	1
Career total			220	10	12	0	7	0	15	2	254	12

== Honours ==
Crawley Town

- EFL League Two play-offs: 2024
