= Jordan Edwards =

Jordan Edwards may refer to:

- Murder of Jordan Edwards (2001–2017), a 15-year-old African American boy murdered by a police officer
- Jordan Edwards (footballer) (born 1999), English footballer
