= Will Henry (footballer) =

English footballer (born 1998)

Personal information
- Full name: William Michael Thomas Henry
- Date of birth: 6 July 1998 (age 28)
- Place of birth: Bristol, England
- Position: Goalkeeper

Team information
- Current team: Salisbury
- Number: 1

Youth career
- 2014–2015: Bristol City
- 2015-2020: Swindon Town

Senior career*
Years	Team	Apps	(Gls)
2015–2020	Swindon Town	5	(0)
2015–2016	→ Shrivenham (loan)	10	(0)
2017	→ Dunstable Town (loan)	4	(0)
2018	→ Hampton & Richmond Borough (loan)	4	(0)
2018	→ Chippenham Town (loan)	6	(0)
2018–2019	→ Swindon Supermarine (loan)	15	(0)
2019	→ Gloucester City (loan)	6	(0)
2019	→ Chippenham Town (loan)	1	(0)
2019	→ Gloucester City (loan)	3	(0)
2020	→ Hereford (loan)	4	(0)
2020	→ Hungerford Town (loan)	2	(0)
2020–2021	Bath City	2	(0)
2021–2026	Chippenham Town	218	(0)
2026–	Salisbury	0	(0)
- * Club domestic league appearances and goals as of 09:14, 7 August 2026 (UTC)

William Michael Thomas Henry (born 6 July 1998) is an English goalkeeper who plays for National League South club Salisbury.

== Club career ==
Henry began his career as a youth team goalkeeper with Bristol City before moving to the youth set-up at Swindon Town.

In October 2015, Henry joined Shrivenham on loan and made his debut in the Berks & Bucks Senior Cup win against East Hendred. On 30 April 2016, Henry made his professional debut for Swindon Town in the 2–2 draw at Rochdale and saved a first half Ian Henderson penalty. On 8 September 2017, Henry joined Southern League Premier Division side Dunstable Town on a one-month loan deal. A day later, Henry made his debut in their 8–1 away defeat against Slough Town.

On 5 February 2018, Henry joined National League South side Hampton & Richmond Borough on loan for the remainder of the campaign. After appearing four times, Swindon recalled Henry, following the arrival of new manager, Phil Brown.

On 9 August 2018, following the arrival of Luke McCormick, Henry was sent out on loan to National League South, Chippenham Town on a one-month loan. He went onto make six league appearances.

On 9 November 2018, Henry joined local rivals, Swindon Supermarine on a one-month loan and made his debut a day later, during a 2–1 defeat to Staines Town. On 7 December, it was announced that Henry's loan would be renewed for a further month. Four days after his loan expired, he returned to Supermarine on a deal until mid-February 2019 following the red card and suspension of Martin Horsell.

He was offered a new contract by Swindon at the end of the 2018–19 season.

Henry was released at the end of the 2019–20 season. Henry joined National League South, side Bath City in September 2020.

Henry joined National League South, side Chippenham Town in June 2021.

== International career ==
On 28 September 2017, Henry received his first international call-up for the England U20 squad by manager Keith Downing for their fixtures against Italy U20 and Czech Republic U20.

== Career statistics ==
As of end of 2025–26 season

Appearances and goals by club, season and competition
Club	Season	League			FA Cup		EFL Cup		Other		Total	
Club	Season	Division	Apps	Goals	Apps	Goals	Apps	Goals	Apps	Goals	Apps	Goals
Swindon Town	2015–16	League One	2	0	0	0	0	0	0	0	2	0
Swindon Town	2016–17	League One	3	0	0	0	0	0	4 (Note: Appearance(s) in EFL Trophy)	0	7	0
Swindon Town	2017–18	League Two	0	0	0	0	0	0	1	0	1	0
Swindon Town	2018–19	League Two	0	0	0	0	0	0	0	0	0	0
Swindon Town	2019–20	League Two	0	0	0	0	0	0	0	0	0	0
Swindon Town	Total		5	0	0	0	0	0	5	0	10	0
Shrivenham (loan)	2015–16	Hellenic League; Division One West	10	0	0	0	—		3 (Note: Appearances in Berks & Bucks FA Intermediate Cup)	0	13	0
Dunstable Town (loan)	2017–18	Southern League; Premier Division	4	0	0	0	—		2 (Note: One appearance in Southern League Cup, one appearance in Bedfordshire Senior Cup)	0	6	0
Hampton & Richmond Borough (loan)	2017–18	National League South	4	0	0	0	—		0	0	4	0
Chippenham Town (loan)	2018–19	National League South	6	0	0	0	—		0	0	6	0
Swindon Supermarine (loan)	2018–19	Southern League; Premier Division South	15	0	0	0	—		3 (Note: Appearances in Wiltshire FA Senior Cup)	0	18	0
Gloucester City (loan)	2018–19	National League South	6	0	0	0	—		0	0	6	0
Chippenham Town (loan)	2019–20	National League South	1	0	2	0	—		0	0	3	0
Gloucester City (loan)	2019–20	National League North	3	0	—		—		0	0	3	0
Hereford (loan)	2019–20	National League North	4	0	—		—		0	0	4	0
Hungerford Town (loan)	2019–20	National League South	2	0	—		—		0	0	2	0
Bath City	2020–21	National League South	2	0	0	0	—		3 (Note: Appearance(s) in FA Trophy)	0	5	0
Chippenham Town	2021–22	National League South	39	0	3	0	—		4 (Note: One appearance in FA Trophy, one appearance in Wiltshire Premier Shield, two appearances in National League South play-offs)	0	46	0
Chippenham Town	2022–23	National League South	45	0	6	0	—		2	0	53	0
Chippenham Town	2023–24	National League South	46	0	1	0	—		4 (Note: Three appearances in FA Trophy, one appearance in Wiltshire Premier Shield)	0	51	0
Chippenham Town	2024–25	National League South	43	0	3	0	—		1	0	47	0
Chippenham Town	2025–26	National League South	45	0	3	0	—		1	0	49	0
Chippenham Town	Total		218	0	16	0	—		12	0	246	0
Salisbury	2026–27	National League South	0	0	0	0	—		0	0	0	0
Career total			280	0	18	0	0	0	28	0	326	0
