= Scott Twine =

English footballer (born 1999)

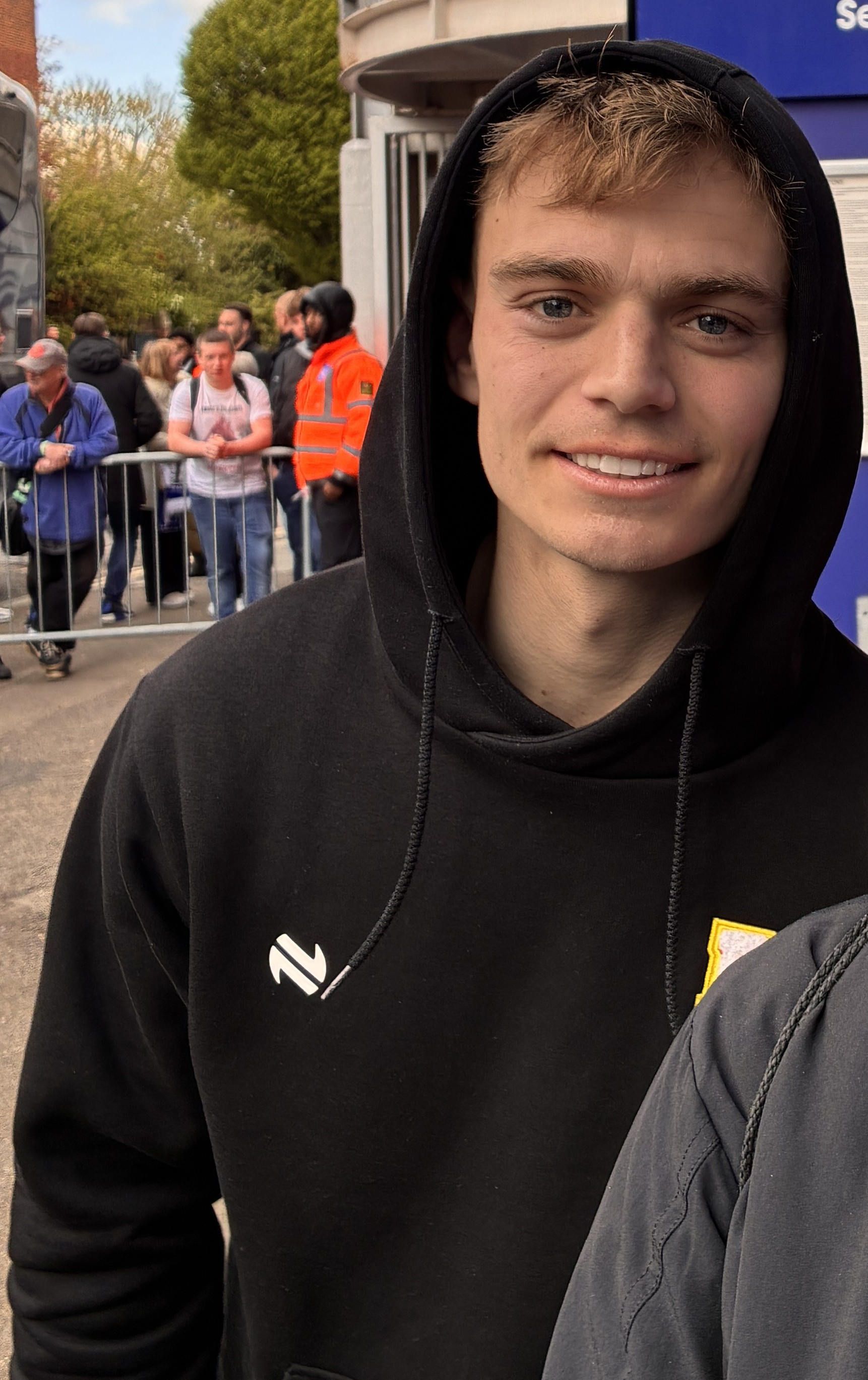
- Twine in 2026

Personal information
- Full name: Scott Edward Twine
- Date of birth: 14 July 1999 (age 27)
- Place of birth: Swindon, England
- Height: 5 ft 9 in (1.74 m)
- Positions: Attacking midfielder; forward

Team information
- Current team: Bristol City
- Number: 10

Youth career
- Royal Wootton Bassett Town
- –2013: Southampton
- 2013–2016: Swindon Town

Senior career*
Years	Team	Apps	(Gls)
2016–2021	Swindon Town	50	(8)
2017–2018	→ Chippenham Town (loan)	15	(4)
2019	→ Waterford (loan)	14	(1)
2020	→ Chippenham Town (loan)	8	(6)
2020–2021	→ Newport County (loan)	19	(6)
2021–2022	Milton Keynes Dons	45	(20)
2022–2024	Burnley	14	(3)
2023–2024	→ Hull City (loan)	25	(4)
2024	→ Bristol City (loan)	10	(2)
2024–	Bristol City	89	(19)
- * Club domestic league appearances and goals as of 17:23, 31 October 2026 (UTC)

Scott Edward Twine (born 14 July 1999) is an English professional footballer who plays as an attacking midfielder or forward for EFL Championship club Bristol City.

== Early life ==
Born in Swindon, Twine started with the youth team of Royal Wootton Bassett Town before joining the academy of Southampton.

== Career ==
=== Swindon Town ===
In 2013 he joined Swindon Town where he progressed through the academy system. He signed professional terms with the club in March 2017, and made his first team debut on the final day of the 2016–17 campaign as a 69th-minute substitute during Swindon's 3–0 defeat away to Charlton Athletic.

During the following 2017–18 season, Twine enjoyed two loan spells with National League South club Chippenham Town, before being recalled for a second time to Swindon in March 2018. At the conclusion of the season, the club exercised an option to extend his contract further.

On 10 November 2018, Twine scored his first Swindon Town goal in a 2–1 home FA Cup first round victory over York City. After featuring regularly during the first half of the 2018–19 season, Twine joined League of Ireland Premier Division club Waterford on loan, and went on to score twice in 15 appearances. The following season he re-joined Chippenham Town on loan once again for a short period, this time scoring 6 goals in just 8 appearances.

In September 2020, Twine joined EFL League Two club Newport County on a season-long loan deal. He enjoyed further success during this period and began to grow his reputation for scoring long range goals, including one in a 2–1 defeat away to Cambridge United, which was later named the EFL League Two Goal of the Month for October 2020.

With Swindon struggling in League One, Twine was recalled by his parent club from his loan in January 2021. Despite Swindon later being relegated to League Two at the end of the 2020–21 season, Twine had scored 14 goals in 49 appearances for both clubs, and was named Newport County's Young Player of the Season.

=== Milton Keynes Dons ===
On 8 June 2021, Twine joined League One club Milton Keynes Dons on free transfer, signing a long-term contract after declining a new deal with Swindon. Due to being under the age of 24, Swindon were later awarded compensation which was set by a tribunal to be £300,000 in addition to a 20% sell-on clause for any future transfer.

He scored his first goal for the club – a free-kick on his league debut – in a 3–3 draw away to Bolton Wanderers on 7 August 2021.

On 28 September 2021, Twine scored his first career hat-trick in a 3–3 draw at home to Fleetwood Town, with two of the goals long range efforts, including a free-kick. On 10 December 2021, Twine was named EFL League One Player of the Month for November 2021 following seven goal contributions in four appearances.

On 30 April 2022, the final day of the regular season, Twine scored 4 goals in a 5–0 win away over Plymouth Argyle, becoming only the second player in the club's history after Will Grigg to score four in a match. A day later, Twine was named both Young Player of the Year and Player of the Year at the club's annual end of season awards.

Following an impressive first season with the club in which he scored 20 goals and made 13 assists, Twine was named the EFL League One Player of the Season for the 2021–22 campaign at the annual EFL Awards ceremony, and was included in both the EFL's League One Team of the Season and PFA Team of the Year alongside teammate Harry Darling.

=== Burnley ===
On 26 June 2022, Twine joined EFL Championship club Burnley on a four-year contract for an undisclosed fee in the region of £4 million. He made his debut on 29 July 2022 as a 70th-minute substitute in a 1–0 away win over Huddersfield Town, however was soon ruled out for several months through an injury first sustained in pre-season. Returning to the side in mid-December, Twine scored his first goal for the club, a trademark free-kick, in a 2–1 home win over West Bromwich Albion on 20 January 2023.

==== Hull City (loan) ====
On 17 August 2023, Twine joined Hull City on a season-long loan. He made his debut on 19 August in the 2–1 away win against Blackburn Rovers. On 28 November 2023, Twine scored his first goal for Hull City in the 4–1 home win against Rotherham United.

==== Bristol City (loan) ====
On 15 January 2024, Twine was recalled from Hull City, before joining Bristol City on loan until the end of the season. On 20 January 2024, Twine scored a header on his debut in a 1–1 draw against Watford FC.

On 21 May 2024, Burnley said the player would return once the loan ended.

=== Bristol City ===
On 16 August 2024, Twine joined Bristol City on a permanent deal, signing at four-year deal for a reported £4m fee.

== Style of play ==
Twine has developed a reputation for scoring long range goals from both open play and free-kicks. Primarily a number ten throughout his career to date, Twine can also operate as a left-winger or striker.

== Career statistics ==
As of 31 October 2026

Appearances and goals by club, season and competition
Club	Season	League			National cup (Note: Includes FA Cup)		League cup (Note: Includes League of Ireland Cup, EFL Cup)		Other		Total	
Club	Season	Division	Apps	Goals	Apps	Goals	Apps	Goals	Apps	Goals	Apps	Goals
Swindon Town	2015–16	League One	0	0	0	0	0	0	0	0	0	0
Swindon Town	2016–17	League One	1	0	0	0	0	0	0	0	1	0
Swindon Town	2017–18	League Two	4	0	0	0	0	0	0	0	4	0
Swindon Town	2018–19	League Two	14	1	2	1	0	0	3 (Note: Appearance(s) in EFL Trophy)	0	19	2
Swindon Town	2019–20	League Two	6	0	1	0	1	0	2	0	10	0
Swindon Town	2020–21	League One	25	7	—		—		—		25	7
Swindon Town	Total		50	8	3	1	1	0	5	0	59	9
Chippenham Town (loan)	2017–18	National League South	15	4	—		—		1 (Note: Appearance in Wiltshire Senior Cup)	1	16	5
Waterford (loan)	2019	LOI Premier Division	14	1	0	0	1	1	—		15	2
Chippenham Town (loan)	2019–20	National League South	8	6	—		—		—		8	6
Newport County (loan)	2020–21	League Two	19	6	1	0	3	1	1	0	24	7
Milton Keynes Dons	2021–22	League One	45	20	2	0	1	0	2 (Note: Appearances in 2021–22 EFL League One play-offs)	0	50	20
Burnley	2022–23	Championship	14	3	3	0	1	0	—		18	3
Burnley	2024–25	Championship	0	0	—		—		—		0	0
Burnley	Total		14	3	3	0	1	0	—		18	3
Hull City (loan)	2023–24	Championship	25	4	1	0	—		—		26	4
Bristol City (loan)	2023–24	Championship	10	2	—		—		—		10	2
Bristol City	2024–25	Championship	35	5	1	1	0	0	1 (Note: Appearances in EFL Championship play-offs)	0	37	6
Bristol City	2025–26	Championship	45	11	2	0	1	0	—		48	11
Bristol City	2026–27	Championship	9	3	0	0	1	0	—		10	3
Bristol City	Total		89	19	3	1	2	0	1	0	95	20
Career total			298	73	13	2	9	2	10	1	340	78

== Honours ==
Burnley

- EFL Championship: 2022–23

Individual

- Newport County Young Player of the Season: 2020–21
- EFL League One Player of the Month: November 2021
- EFL League One Team of the Season: 2021–22
- EFL League One Player of the Season: 2021–22
- Milton Keynes Dons Young Player of the Year: 2021–22
- Milton Keynes Dons Player of the Year: 2021–22
- PFA Team of the Year: 2021–22 League One
