= Joe Romanski =

English footballer (born 2000)

Joseph Romanski
Personal information
- Full name: Joseph Rio Romanski
- Date of birth: 3 February 2000 (age 26)
- Place of birth: Reading, England
- Height: 1.90 m (6 ft 3 in)
- Position: Defender

Team information
- Current team: Melksham Town

Youth career
- Theale Tigers
- Eversley & California
- 2015–2018: Swindon Town

Senior career*
Years	Team	Apps	(Gls)
2018–2020	Swindon Town	6	(1)
2019	→ Bath City (loan)	8	(0)
2019–2020	→ Melksham Town (loan)	23	(5)
2020–2021	Zagłębie Lubin II	21	(1)
2021–2022	Wróblowianka Wróblowice		
2022–	Melksham Town	8	(1)
- * Club domestic league appearances and goals as of 17:28, 14 May 2023 (UTC)

Joseph Rio Romanski (born 3 February 2000) is an English semi-professional footballer who plays as a defender for Melksham Town.

== Career ==
Progressing through the Swindon Town youth ranks following spells at Theale Tigers and Eversley & California, Romanski first appeared in the senior squad during the Robins' EFL Trophy fixture against Wycombe Wanderers in October 2017, remaining as an unused substitute in the 1–0 victory. On 21 April 2018, Romanski made his Swindon debut during their 1–0 home defeat against Grimsby Town, featuring for the full 90 minutes. He was offered a new contract by Swindon at the end of the 2017–18 season. In August 2018, on his first league appearance of the season, Romanski scored his first professional goal for Swindon Town. The 73rd-minute winner in a 3–2 victory against Tranmere Rovers. Later that same season, in January 2019, Romanski joined Bath City on loan for the remainder of the campaign, making his first team debut in the 0–0 draw with Gloucester City. He was offered a new contract by Swindon at the end of the 2018–19 season.

Following his release at the end of the 2019–20 season, Romanski joined Polish side Zagłębie Lubin initially linking up with their B team in the fourth-tier.

After spending a season with Zagłębie II, in late October 2021 he moved to regional league club Wróblowianka Wróblowice, where he joined his cousin Jakub Kaganek.

On 11 October 2022, Romanski returned to Melksham Town where he had a previous loan spell during the 2019–20 campaign.

== Personal life ==
Romanski's father Roman is from Kraków, Poland.

== Career statistics ==
As of match played 7 March 2023

Appearances and goals by club, season and competition
Club	Season	League			National cup		League cup		Other		Total	
Club	Season	Division	Apps	Goals	Apps	Goals	Apps	Goals	Apps	Goals	Apps	Goals
Swindon Town	2017–18	League Two	2	0	0	0	0	0	0	0	2	0
Swindon Town	2018–19	League Two	4	1	0	0	1	0	3 (Note: Appearances in the EFL Trophy)	0	8	1
Swindon Town	2019–20	League Two	0	0	0	0	0	0	0	0	0	0
Swindon Town	Total		6	1	0	0	1	0	3	0	10	1
Bath City (loan)	2018–19	National League South	8	0	—		—		—		8	0
Melksham Town (loan)	2019–20	Southern League Division One South	23	5	—		—		4 (Note: One appearance in the Southern League Cup, three in the FA Trophy)	0	27	5
Zagłębie Lubin II	2020–21	III liga, group III	21	1	—		—		—		21	1
Melksham Town	2022–23	Southern League Division One South	8	1	—		—		0	0	8	1
Career total			66	8	0	0	1	0	7	0	74	8
