= Ellis Iandolo =

English footballer

Personal information
- Full name: Ellis Carlo Iandolo
- Date of birth: 22 August 1997 (age 29)
- Place of birth: Chatham, England
- Height: 5 ft 10 in (1.78 m)
- Position: Midfielder

Team information
- Current team: Colchester United
- Number: 3

Youth career
- –2012: Gillingham
- 2014–2015: Maidstone United

Senior career*
Years	Team	Apps	(Gls)
2014–2015	Maidstone United	0	(0)
2015–2023	Swindon Town	137	(3)
2023–	Colchester United	90	(4)
- * Club domestic league appearances and goals as of 23:37, 23 August 2026 (UTC)

Ellis Carlo Iandolo (born 22 August 1997) is an English professional footballer who plays primarily as a left full-back for EFL League Two club Colchester United. Iandolo can also play at wing-back and in midfield.

== Club career ==
=== Early career ===
Born in Chatham, Kent, Iandolo played for the Maidstone-based academy side Soccer Elite FA (SEFA), for whom he was playing against Gillingham which led to him being picked up by Kent's only Football League club. After being released in 2012 by The Gills, Iandolo returned to SEFA and in the summer of 2013 Iandolo became a Soccer Elite FA Scholar, combining full-time study with daily training with SEFA Scholarship coaches Lee Spiller and Andy Hessenthaler.

He signed for Maidstone United in July 2014. On 27 September 2014, Iandolo featured as an unused substitute in Maidstone's 2–1 home victory over Brentwood Town in their FA Cup second qualifying round tie.

=== Swindon Town ===
In July 2015, Iandolo impressed playing for the SEFA Scholars against Swindon Town's under 18s. The Robins duly offered him a trial and in August Iandolo was offered a one-year professional contract. Iandolo became the third SEFA Scholar to become a professional within the space of a year, following in the footsteps of Aaron Simpson and Kaiyne Woolery.

On 1 September 2015, Iandolo made his professional debut for Swindon during their Football League Trophy tie against Newport County, replacing Kevin Stewart in the 1–1 draw. Which Swindon eventually won 7–6 on penalties. On 8 July 2016, following his debut season, Iandolo signed a new one-year deal. On 6 December 2016, Iandolo netted his first goal for Swindon in a 3–2 away defeat during their EFL Trophy second round tie against Luton Town. Following the appointment of David Flitcroft, Iandolo's game time increased and he went onto score his first league goal during Swindon's 2–1 victory against Barnet, netting a 35-yard free-kick in the 17th minute. After starting every game in January 2018 he was replaced by the experienced Matthew Taylor who remained first choice at left-back until the end of the season.

At the start of the 2018/19 season, Swindon manager Phil Brown declared that Ellis was going to play as a midfielder, with Iandolo subsequently making 6 appearances in midfield by the end of October. Iandolo was used as a left-back and left wing-back by Swindon Town manager Richie Wellens. Ellis signed a two-year contract extension in July 2019 keeping him at the club until 2022.

=== Colchester United ===
On 1 July 2023, Iandolo signed a two-year contract with Colchester United for an undisclosed fee. He signed a new contract with the club on 3 July 2026.

== Career statistics ==
As of match played 18 April 2026

Appearances and goals by club, season and competition
Club	Season	League			FA Cup		League Cup		Other		Total	
Club	Season	Division	Apps	Goals	Apps	Goals	Apps	Goals	Apps	Goals	Apps	Goals
Maidstone United	2014–15	Isthmian League Premier Division	0	0	0	0	—		0	0	0	0
Swindon Town	2015–16	League One	12	0	0	0	0	0	1 (Note: Appearance in Football League Trophy)	0	13	0
Swindon Town	2016–17	League One	10	0	0	0	1	0	4 (Note: Appearance(s) in EFL Trophy)	1	15	1
Swindon Town	2017–18	League Two	12	1	0	0	1	0	4	0	17	1
Swindon Town	2018–19	League Two	15	0	2	0	0	0	3	0	20	0
Swindon Town	2019–20	League Two	13	0	1	0	0	0	3	0	17	0
Swindon Town	2020–21	League One	8	0	1	0	1	0	2	0	12	0
Swindon Town	2021–22	League Two	44	1	3	0	1	0	4	0	52	1
Swindon Town	2022–23	League Two	23	1	1	0	0	0	2	0	26	1
Swindon Town	Total		137	3	8	0	4	0	23	1	172	4
Colchester United	2023–24	League Two	23	1	0	0	1	0	0	0	24	1
Colchester United	2024–25	League Two	44	1	1	0	2	0	3	0	50	1
Colchester United	2025–26	League Two	21	1	1	0	0	0	0	0	22	1
Colchester United	Total		88	3	2	0	3	0	3	0	96	3
Career total			226	6	10	0	7	0	26	1	268	7

== Honours ==
Swindon Town

- EFL League Two: 2019–20
