= Sidy Sanokho =

French footballer (born 1997)

Personal information
- Full name: Sidy Mohamed Sanokho
- Date of birth: 8 May 1997 (age 29)
- Place of birth: Le Havre, France
- Height: 1.87 m (6 ft 2 in)
- Position: Midfielder

Team information
- Current team: Sūduva
- Number: 94

Youth career
- Gentilly AC
- COSM Arcueil
- Montrouge FC 92
- UJA Maccabi Paris Métropole
- Spezia Calcio
- 2016–201?: Novara Calcio

Senior career*
Years	Team	Apps	(Gls)
2017–2018	Racing Club de France		
2018–2019	AS Furiani-Agliani		
2019–2020	Swindon Town	0	(0)
2020–2021	Nancy II	5	
2024	FK Be1	?	(?)
2025	→ Sūduva (loan)	34	(6)
2026–	Sūduva	20	(2)
- * Club domestic league appearances and goals as of 10 September 2026

Sidy Mohamed Sanokho (born 8 May 1997) is a French professional footballer who plays as a midfielder.

== Playing career ==
Sanokho spent his youth career with French clubs Gentilly AC, COSM Arcueil, Montrouge FC 92, UJA Maccabi Paris Métropole, and then Italian sides Spezia Calcio and Novara Calcio. He then returned to France to pay senior football with Racing Club de France and AS Furiani-Agliani. He travelled to England and signed a short-term contract with EFL League Two side Swindon Town in August 2019 after impressing manager Richie Wellens on a trial basis. He made his first-team debut for the "Robins" on 13 November, in a 1–0 defeat at Bristol Rovers in the EFL Trophy.

== Statistics ==
As of match played 19 November 2019

Club	Season	League			FA Cup		EFL Cup		Other		Total	
Club	Season	Division	Apps	Goals	Apps	Goals	Apps	Goals	Apps	Goals	Apps	Goals
Swindon Town	2019–20	EFL League Two	0	0	1	0	0	0	1 (Note: Appearance/s in the EFL Trophy.)	0	2	0
Career total			0	0	1	0	0	0	1	0	2	0
