= 2017–18 Swindon Town F.C. season =

Swindon Town
2017–18 season
- Chairman: Lee Power
- Manager: David Flitcroft (until 1 March 2018); Matt Taylor (caretaker) (until 12 March 2018); Phil Brown (12 March 2018)
- Stadium: County Ground
- League Two: 9th
- FA Cup: Second round (eliminated by Stevenage)
- EFL Cup: First round (eliminated by Norwich City)
- EFL Trophy: Second round (eliminated by Forest Green Rovers)
- Top goalscorer: League: Luke Norris (13); All: Luke Norris (14)
- Highest home attendance: 8,526 vs Luton Town (26 December 2017)
- Lowest home attendance: 1,236 vs Wycombe Wanderers (31 October 2017)
- Average home league attendance: 6,436
Home colours	Away colours

The 2017–18 season is Swindon Town's 139th season in their existence, and first season back in EFL League Two following relegation from EFL League One. The season covers the period from 1 July 2017 through to 30 June 2018.

== Players ==
=== First Team Squad ===
As of 5 May 2017

No.	Name	Nat	Position	Since	Date of birth (age)	Signed from	Games	Goals
Goalkeepers
12	Will Henry	(England)	GK	2015	6 July 1998 (age 28)	Academy	10	0
21	Reice Charles-Cook	(England)	GK	2017	8 April 1994 (age 32)	(England) Coventry City	25	0
28	Stuart Moore	(England)	GK	2018	8 September 1994 (age 32)	(England) Barrow	10	0
Defenders
2	Ben Purkiss	(England)	RB	2017	1 April 1984 (age 42)	(England) Port Vale	45	0
4	Matt Preston	(England)	CB	2017	16 March 1995 (age 31)	(England) Walsall	26	3
5	Chris Robertson	(Scotland)	CB	2017	11 October 1986 (age 40)	(England) AFC Wimbledon	22	1
6	Olly Lancashire	(England)	CB	2017	13 December 1988 (age 37)	(England) Shrewsbury Town	41	2
23	Joe Romanski	(England)	CB	2017	3 February 2000 (age 26)	Academy	2	0
24	Kyle Knoyle	(England)	RB	2017	24 September 1996 (age 30)	(England) West Ham United	21	0
25	Dion Conroy	(England)	CB	2017	11 December 1995 (age 30)	(England) Chelsea	22	0
32	Rollin Menayese	(Wales)	CB	2018	4 December 1997 (age 28)	(England) Bristol Rovers	14	0
34	Ryan McGivern	(Northern Ireland)	LB	2018	8 January 1990 (age 36)	(England) Northampton Town	6	0
Midfielders
8	James Dunne	(England)	DM	2017	18 September 1989 (age 37)	(England) Cambridge United	46	0
14	Ellis Iandolo	(England)	AM	2015	22 August 1997 (age 29)	(England) Maidstone United	45	2
16	Amine Linganzi	(Republic of the Congo)	CM	2017	16 November 1989 (age 36)	(England) Portsmouth	29	4
18	Donal McDermott	(Republic of Ireland)	AM	2017	19 October 1989 (age 37)	(England) Rochdale	21	1
19	Timi Elšnik	(Slovenia)	CM	2017	29 April 1998 (age 28)	(England) Derby County	25	5
26	Jordan Young	(Scotland)	AM	2015	31 July 1999 (age 27)	Academy	6	1
31	Matt Taylor	(England)	LM	2017	27 November 1981 (age 44)	(England) Northampton Town	41	7
35	Jordan Edwards	(England)	AM	2018	26 October 1999 (age 27)	Academy	1	0
Forwards
7	Paul Mullin	(England)	CF	2017	6 November 1994 (age 32)	(England) Morecambe	47	10
9	Luke Norris	(England)	CF	2016	3 June 1993 (age 33)	(England) Gillingham	84	20
17	Marc Richards	(England)	CF	2018	8 July 1982 (age 44)	(England) Northampton Town	20	11
22	Kaiyne Woolery	(England)	CF	2017	11 January 1995 (age 31)	(England) Wigan Athletic	43	5
27	Scott Twine	(England)	CF	2016	14 July 1999 (age 27)	Academy	5	0
30	Keshi Anderson	(England)	SS	2018	6 April 1995 (age 31)	(England) Crystal Palace	40	5

== Transfers ==
=== In ===
Date from	Position	Nationality	Name	From	Fee	Ref.
1 July 2017	CM	(England)	James Dunne	Cambridge United	Free transfer	
1 July 2017	CB	(England)	Olly Lancashire	Shrewsbury Town	Free transfer	
1 July 2017	CM	(Republic of the Congo)	Amine Linganzi	Portsmouth	Free transfer	
1 July 2017	CF	(England)	Paul Mullin	Morecambe	Undisclosed	
1 July 2017	RB	(England)	Ben Purkiss	Port Vale	Free transfer	
1 July 2017	CB	(Scotland)	Chris Robertson	AFC Wimbledon	Free transfer	
13 July 2017	AM	(Republic of Ireland)	Donal McDermott	Rochdale	Free transfer	
2 August 2017	RB	(England)	Kyle Knoyle	West Ham United	Free transfer	
7 August 2017	CF	(England)	Kaiyne Woolery	Wigan Athletic	£350,000	
22 August 2017	CM	(England)	Matt Taylor	Northampton Town	Free transfer	
31 August 2017	GK	(England)	Reice Charles-Cook	Coventry City	Undisclosed	
25 September 2017	CB	(England)	Matt Preston	Walsall	Free transfer	
15 January 2018	CF	(England)	Marc Richards	Northampton Town	Free transfer	
16 January 2018	SS	(England)	Keshi Anderson	Crystal Palace	Undisclosed	
27 January 2018	GK	(England)	Stuart Moore	Barrow	Free transfer	
15 March 2018	LB	(Northern Ireland)	Ryan McGivern	Northampton Town	Free transfer	

=== Out ===
Date from	Position	Nationality	Name	To	Fee	Ref.
1 July 2017	RB	(England)	Bradley Barry	Chesterfield (Note: Bradley Barry joined Chesterfield following his release from the club.)	Released	
1 July 2017	CB	(Brazil)	Raphael Rossi Branco	Boavista (Note: Raphael Rossi Branco joined Boavista following his release from the club.)	Released	
1 July 2017	CM	(Scotland)	Callum Gunner	Bradford City (Note: Callum Gunner joined Bradford City following his release from the club.)	Released	
1 July 2017	CF	(England)	Jermaine Hylton	Solihull Moors (Note: Jermaine Hylton joined Solihull Moors following his release from the club.)	Released	
1 July 2017	CM	(Iraq)	Yaser Kasim	Northampton Town (Note: Yaser Kasim joined Northampton Town after rejecting a contract offer from Swindon.)	Released	
1 July 2017	CF	(England)	Jonathan Obika	Oxford United (Note: Jonathan Obika joined Oxford United following his release.)	Released	
1 July 2017	LB	(England)	Brandon Ormonde-Ottewill	Helmond Sport (Note: Brandon Ormonde-Ottewill joined Helmond Sport following his release from the club.)	Released	
1 July 2017	CM	(Republic of Ireland)	Anton Rodgers	Hungerford Town (Note: Anton Rodgers joined Hungerford Town following his release from the club.)	Released	
1 July 2017	CB	(Northern Ireland)	Jamie Sendles-White	Leyton Orient (Note: Jamie Sendles-White joined Leyton Orient following his release from the club.)	Released	
1 July 2017	AM	(Northern Ireland)	Jordan Stewart	Linfield (Note: Jordan Stewart joined Linfield following his release from the club.)	Released	
1 July 2017	CB	(England)	Nathan Thompson	Portsmouth (Note: Nathan Thompson joined Portsmouth following his release from the club.)	Released	
19 July 2017	CM	(England)	Jordan Simpson	Forest Green Rovers	Free	
23 August 2017	CM	(England)	Conor Thomas	ATK	Mutual consent	
5 September 2017	CM	(England)	Jesse Starkey	Gillingham (Note: Jesse Starkey joined Gillingham following his release from the club.)	Mutual consent	
10 November 2017	CM	(England)	Jake Evans	Farnborough	Mutual consent	
31 January 2018	LM	(England)	James Brophy	Leyton Orient	Undisclosed	
31 January 2018	AM	(England)	John Goddard	Stevenage	Undisclosed	

=== Loans in ===
Date from	Position	Nationality	Name	From	Date until	Ref.
7 July 2017	LB	(England)	Chris Hussey	Sheffield United	3 May 2018	(Note: On 3 May 2018, Chris Hussey's loan at Swindon Town was terminated.)
12 July 2017	CF	(England)	Harry Smith	Millwall	26 December 2017	(Note: On 26 December 2017, Harry Smith's loan at Swindon Town was terminated.)
31 August 2017	CM	(Slovenia)	Timi Elšnik	Derby County	30 June 2018	
31 August 2017	RW	(England)	Kellan Gordon	Derby County	19 April 2018	(Note: On 19 April 2018, Kellan Gordon's loan at Swindon Town was terminated.)
31 August 2017	SS	(England)	Keshi Anderson	Crystal Palace	1 January 2018	
12 January 2018	AM	(England)	Ollie Banks	Oldham Athletic	3 May 2018	(Note: On 3 May 2018, Ollie Banks' loan at Swindon Town was terminated.)
31 January 2018	CB	(Wales)	Rollin Menayese	Bristol Rovers	30 June 2018	

=== Loans out ===
Date from	Position	Nationality	Name	To	End Date	Ref.
19 August 2017	CM	(England)	Jake Evans	Farnborough	10 November 2017	
8 September 2017	CF	(England)	Scott Twine	Chippenham Town	9 December 2017	
8 September 2017	GK	(England)	Will Henry	Dunstable Town	8 October 2017	
21 September 2017	LM	(England)	James Brophy	Leyton Orient	24 November 2017	(Note: On 24 November 2017, Swindon Town exercised the option to recall James Brophy.)
29 September 2017	CM	(England)	Tommy Ouldridge	Chippenham Town	28 October 2017	
12 October 2017	CM	(England)	Tom Smith	Bath City	24 November 2017	(Note: On 10 November 2017, Tom Smith's loan at Bath City was extended until early January.) (Note: On 24 November 2017, Swindon Town exercised the option to recall Tom Smith.)
17 November 2017	CM	(England)	Tommy Ouldridge	Cirencester Town	30 June 2018	(Note: On 26 January 2018, Tommy Ouldridge's loan at Cirencester Town was extended until 30 June 2018.)
8 December 2017	CM	(England)	Tom Smith	Bath City	8 January 2018	
19 January 2018	CM	(England)	Tom Smith	Bath City	30 June 2018	
29 January 2018	CF	(England)	Scott Twine	Chippenham Town	7 March 2018	(Note: On 7 March 2018, Swindon Town exercised the option to recall Scott Twine.)
5 February 2018	GK	(England)	Will Henry	Hampton & Richmond Borough	16 March 2018	(Note: On 16 March 2018, Swindon Town exercised the option to recall Will Henry.)
23 February 2018	GK	(Chile)	Lawrence Vigouroux	Waterford	30 June 2018	

== Pre-season ==
As of 20 July 2017, Swindon Town have announced six pre-season fixtures against Melksham Town, Swindon Supermarine, Oldham Athletic, Woking, Salisbury and Chippenham Town. On Tuesday 18 July 2017 Swindon Town travelled to Faro, Portugal for a week long pre-season training camp. The warm weather pre-season tour included a behind closed doors training ground friendly against Bristol Rovers which ended 0–0.

8 July 2017	Swindon Supermarine	1–7	Swindon Town	Swindon
15:00 BST	Parsons 63'	Report	Slew 33'; Thomas 38'; Goddard 43'; Norris 50'; Mullin 60', 76', 84'	Stadium: Webb's Wood Stadium

11 July 2017	Melksham Town	0–5	Swindon Town	Melksham
19:30 BST		Report	Norris 33'; Thomas 63', 84'; Twine 83'; Mullin 88'	Stadium: The Oakfield Stadium

14 July 2017	Swindon Town	1–1	Oldham Athletic	Swindon
12:00 BST	Iandolo	Report	Amadi-Holloway	Stadium: County Ground

17 July 2017	Salisbury	1–1	Swindon Town	Salisbury
19:00 BST	Herbert 77'	Report	Smith 22'	Stadium: Raymond McEnhill Stadium

29 July 2017	Woking	0–3	Swindon Town	Woking
15:00 BST		Report	Norris 60'; Conroy 79'; Goddard 83'	Stadium: Kingfield Stadium; Attendance: 777; Referee: Charles Breakspear

1 August 2017	Chippenham Town	2–3	Swindon Town	Chippenham
19:00 BST	Richards 57'; Pratt 88'	Report	Starkey 10'; Smith 29'; Twine 38'	Stadium: Hardenhuish Park; Attendance: 680

== Competitions ==
=== Overview ===
Competition	Record							
Competition	G	W	D	L	GF	GA	GD	Win %
League Two	46	20	8	18	67	65	+2	43.48
FA Cup	2	1	0	1	7	6	+1	50.00
EFL Cup	1	0	0	1	2	3	−1	0.00
EFL Trophy	4	2	0	2	7	6	+1	50.00
Total	53	23	8	22	83	80	+3	43.40

Updated to match played 5 May 2018
Source: Competitions

=== League Two ===
==== League table ====
Pos	Team	Pld	W	D	L	GF	GA	GD	Pts	Promotion, qualification or relegation
7	Lincoln City	46	20	15	11	64	48	+16	75	Qualification for League Two play-offs (Note: Four teams play for one spot and promotion to EFL League One.)
8	Mansfield Town	46	18	18	10	67	52	+15	72	
9	Swindon Town	46	20	8	18	67	65	+2	68	
10	Carlisle United	46	17	16	13	62	54	+8	67	
11	Newport County	46	16	16	14	56	58	−2	64	

Source: BBC Sport
Rules for classification: 1) Points; 2) Goal difference; 3) Number of goals scored

==== Results summary ====
Overall								Home						Away					
Pld	W	D	L	GF	GA	GD	Pts	W	D	L	GF	GA	GD	W	D	L	GF	GA	GD
46	20	8	18	67	65	+2	68	9	5	9	29	36	−7	11	3	9	38	29	+9

Last updated: 5 May 2018.
Source: Soccerway

==== Results by matchday ====
Matchday	1	2	3	4	5	6	7	8	9	10	11	12	13	14	15	16	17	18	19	20	21	22	23	24	25	26	27	28	29	30	31	32	33	34	35	36	37	38	39	40	41	42	43	44	45	46
Ground	A	H	A	H	H	A	A	H	A	H	H	A	A	H	H	A	H	A	A	H	H	A	H	H	A	H	A	H	A	A	A	H	A	H	A	H	A	A	H	A	H	H	A	H	A	H
Result	W	D	W	L	L	W	L	W	W	L	W	L	W	L	W	W	D	W	L	L	L	W	L	W	W	W	L	W	W	D	L	W	L	W	L	L	W	L	D	D	D	D	L	L	D	W
Position	7	6	1	9	13	9	14	8	7	11	9	11	8	10	7	5	5	5	5	8	10	10	11	10	9	9	10	8	6	7	7	5	6	6	7	9	9	9	9	9	9	9	9	9	10	9

Updated to match(es) played on 5 May 2018. Source: Soccerway
A = Away; H = Home; W = Win; D = Draw; L = Loss

==== Matches ====
Win Draw Loss

The fixtures for the 2017–18 season were announced on 21 June 2017 at 9am.

5 August 2017 1	Carlisle United	1–2	Swindon Town	Carlisle
15:00 BST	Jones (yellow card) 41'; Joyce 55'	Report	Norris 31'; Mullin 48' (yellow card) 66'; Iandolo (yellow card) 78'; Smith (yellow card) 90'	Stadium: Brunton Park; Attendance: 6,036; Referee: Andy Haines

12 August 2017 2	Swindon Town	1–1	Exeter City	Swindon
15:00 BST	Woolery 56'; Dunne (yellow card) 78'	Report	McAlinden 28'; Taylor (yellow card) 65'; James (yellow card) 88'	Stadium: County Ground; Attendance: 7,795; Referee: Darren Drysdale

19 August 2017 3	Morecambe	0–1	Swindon Town	Morecambe
15:00 BST	Rose (yellow card) 36'	Report	McDermott 13'; Mullin (yellow card) 80'	Stadium: Globe Arena; Attendance: 1,655; Referee: Mark Heywood

26 August 2017 4	Swindon Town	0–3	Crawley Town	Swindon
15:00 BST	Conroy (yellow card) 45+2'; Lancashire (yellow card) 71'	Report	Evina (yellow card) 26'; Lancashire 36' (o.g.); Smith 79', 85'	Stadium: County Ground; Attendance: 6,613; Referee: Brett Huxtable

2 September 2017 5	Swindon Town	1–4	Barnet	Swindon
15:00 BST	Norris (yellow card) 12', (goal) 78'; McDermott (red card) 50'	Report	Coulthirst 10', 65', 69'; Campbell-Ryce 16' (pen.); Blackman (red card) 80'	Stadium: County Ground; Attendance: 5,895; Referee: James Linington

9 September 2017 6	Luton Town	0–3	Swindon Town	Luton
15:00 BST	Cuthbert (red card) 32'; Collins (yellow card) 34'; Sheehan (yellow card) 40'; Potts (yellow card) 67'	Report	Norris 32' (pen.); Hussey 51'; Mullin 62'; Anderson (yellow card) 75'	Stadium: Kenilworth Road; Attendance: 8,455; Referee: Graham Salisbury

12 September 2017 7	Notts County	1–0	Swindon Town	Nottingham
19:45 BST	Stead 32' (pen.)	Report	Norris (yellow card) 33'	Stadium: Meadow Lane; Attendance: 5,107; Referee: Scott Duncan

16 September 2017 8	Swindon Town	3–2	Stevenage	Swindon
15:00 BST	Norris 9', 62' (pen.), (yellow card) 45+2'; Anderson 13'; Robertson (yellow card) 53'; Dunne (yellow card) 68'; Hussey (yellow card) 75'; Lancashire (yellow card) 88'	Report	Newton 51', (yellow card) 79'; Martin 89'; Godden (yellow card) 90'	Stadium: County Ground; Attendance: 6,022; Referee: John Brooks

22 September 2017 9	Forest Green Rovers	0–2	Swindon Town	Nailsworth
19:45 BST	Bennett (yellow card) 43'; Roberts (yellow card) 65'; Cooper (yellow card) 87'	Report	Robertson (yellow card) 58'; Lancashire 86'; Taylor 90'	Stadium: The New Lawn; Attendance: 3,305; Referee: Darren Drysdale

26 September 2017 10	Swindon Town	1–2	Coventry City	Swindon
19:45 BST	Norris 20', (yellow card) 50'; Dunne (red card) 72'; Anderson (yellow card) 90+1'	Report	Doyle 32', (yellow card) 73'; McDonald (yellow card) 74'; Nazon 76'; Kelly-Evans (yellow card) 78'	Stadium: County Ground; Attendance: 6,340; Referee: Charles Breakspear

30 September 2017 11	Swindon Town	2–0	Cambridge United	Swindon
15:00 BST	Anderson 13'; Smith 88'	Report	Deegan (yellow card) 6'	Stadium: County Ground; Attendance: 5,847; Referee: Andy Woolmer

7 October 2017 12	Cheltenham Town	2–1	Swindon Town	Cheltenham
15:00 BST	Graham 20', (yellow card) 62'; Pell (yellow card) 49'; Wright 90+4'	Report	Preston 53'; Taylor (yellow card) 55'	Stadium: Whaddon Road; Attendance: 5,050; Referee: Robert Jones

14 October 2017 13	Mansfield Town	1–3	Swindon Town	Mansfield
15:00 BST	Pearce (yellow card) 54'; Angol (yellow card) 66'; Rose 90+1'	Report	Linganzi 4'; Goddard 45'; Norris 54' (pen.); Charles-Cook (yellow card) 78'	Stadium: Field Mill; Attendance: 4,081; Referee: Oliver Langford

17 October 2017 14	Swindon Town	0–1	Lincoln City	Swindon
19:45 BST		Report	Arnold (yellow card) 70'; Bostwick (yellow card) 75'; Raggett 83'	Stadium: County Ground; Attendance: 5,864; Referee: Scott Oldham

21 October 2017 15	Swindon Town	1–0	Wycombe Wanderers	Swindon
15:00 BST	Smith 15', (yellow card) 77'	Report	Cowan-Hall (yellow card) 58'; Jacobson (yellow card) 87'; Bean (yellow card) 90+5'	Stadium: County Ground; Attendance: 7,114; Referee: John Brooks

28 October 2017 16	Port Vale	0–3	Swindon Town	Burslem
15:00 BST	Anderson (yellow card) 13'; Gunning (yellow card) 89'	Report	Taylor 51'; Mullin 71'; Gordon 85'	Stadium: Vale Park; Attendance: 5,071; Referee: Graham Horwood

11 November 2017 17	Swindon Town	2–2	Chesterfield	Swindon
15:00 GMT	Woolery (yellow card) 36'; Dunne (yellow card) 45+1'; Elšnik 47'; Norris 90+6' (pen.)	Report	Dennis 56' (yellow card) 90+5'; Reed (yellow card) 63'; McCourt 72'; Maguire (yellow card) 89'; Evatt (yellow card) 90+5'	Stadium: County Ground; Referee: Lee Collins

18 November 2017 18	Yeovil Town	1–2	Swindon Town	Yeovil
15:00 GMT	Browne 4'; James (yellow card) 62'; Santos (yellow card) 90+1'; Smith (yellow card) 90+4'	Report	Purkiss (yellow card) 65'; Gordon 67'; Taylor (yellow card) 88'; Anderson 89'	Stadium: Huish Park; Attendance: 3,622; Referee: Craig Higgs

21 November 2017 19	Grimsby Town	3–2	Swindon Town	Cleethorpes
19:45 GMT	Matt 11'; Dembélé 71'; Rose 86'	Report	Anderson 26'; Matt 28' (og.); Preston (yellow card) 39'; Smith (yellow card) 62'	Stadium: Blundell Park; Attendance: 3,023; Referee: Martin Coy

25 November 2017 20	Swindon Town	0–1	Newport County	Swindon
15:00 GMT	Anderson (yellow card) 50'	Report	Labadie (yellow card) 34'; Nouble (yellow card) 56'; Tozer 76'	Stadium: County Ground; Attendance: 6,764; Referee: James Linington

15 December 2017 21	Swindon Town	2–3	Colchester United	Swindon
19:45 GMT	Woolery 36'; Gordon 76'	Report	Kent (yellow card) 6' (goal) 45+1'; Mandron 63'; Szmodics 78' (yellow card) 82'	Stadium: County Ground; Attendance: 6,020; Referee: Dean Whitestone

23 December 2017 22	Crewe Alexandra	0–3	Swindon Town	Crewe
15:00 GMT	Pickering (yellow card) 54'	Report	Woolery 8', (yellow card) 84'; Linganzi 17'; Norris 20' (pen.), (yellow card) 63'; Taylor (yellow card) 68'; Purkiss (yellow card) 71'	Stadium: Gresty Road; Attendance: 3,736; Referee: Eddie Ilderton

26 December 2017 23	Swindon Town	0–5	Luton Town	Swindon
15:00 GMT	Dunne (yellow card) 52'; Lancashire (yellow card) 58'	Report	Collins 48'; Hylton 55', (yellow card) 57'; Taylor 66' (og.); Cornick 72'; Lee 84'	Stadium: County Ground; Attendance: 8,526; Referee: Gavin Ward

30 December 2017 24	Swindon Town	1–0	Notts County	Swindon
15:00 GMT	Norris 47'; Dunne (yellow card) 90+3'	Report	Brisley (yellow card) 17'; Grant (yellow card) 90+4'	Stadium: County Ground; Attendance: 6,247; Referee: Ben Toner

1 January 2018 25	Barnet	1–2	Swindon Town	Canons Park
15:00 GMT	Akinde 20'; Nelson (yellow card) 45+2'; Tutonda (yellow card) 84'; Campbell-Ryce (yellow card) 89'	Report	Iandolo 17'; Preston 45+2'; Gordon (yellow card) 77'	Stadium: The Hive Stadium; Attendance: 2,038; Referee: Craig Hicks

13 January 2018 26	Swindon Town	1–0	Forest Green Rovers	Swindon
15:00 GMT	Dunne (yellow card) 45+7'; Anderson (yellow card) 59'; Norris 79'; Mullin (yellow card) 83'	Report	Grubb (yellow card) 70'; Wishart (yellow card) 87'; Reid (yellow card) 87'; Gunning (yellow card) 90+3'	Stadium: County Ground; Attendance: 7,062; Referee: Dean Whitestone

20 January 2018 27	Coventry City	3–1	Swindon Town	Coventry
15:00 GMT	Davies (yellow card) 16'; Biamou 17'; McNulty 22' (pen.), 81'; Grimmer (yellow card) 77'; Doyle (yellow card) 69'	Report	Gordon (yellow card) 36'; Banks 39'	Stadium: Ricoh Arena; Attendance: 8,643; Referee: Steve Martin

27 January 2018 28	Swindon Town	4–3	Crewe Alexandra	Swindon
15:00 GMT	Richards 3', 89', (yellow card) 90'; Elšnik 66', 79'; Preston (yellow card) 87'; Anderson (yellow card) 90+8'	Report	Ainley 15', 29'; McKirdy (yellow card) 24'; Wintle 51'; Kirk (yellow card) 58'; Bakayogo (yellow card) 61' (yellow-red card) 80'; Richards (yellow card) 67'; Garratt (yellow card) 84'	Stadium: County Ground; Referee: Graham Salisbury

30 January 2018 29	Stevenage	0–1	Swindon Town	Stevenage
19:45 GMT	Vancooten (yellow card) 3'; Henry (yellow card) 45+2'; Amos (yellow card) 87'	Report	Banks 16'	Stadium: Broadhall Way; Attendance: 2,116; Referee: Darren Drysdale

3 February 2018 30	Lincoln City	2–2	Swindon Town	Lincoln
15:00 GMT	Woodyard (yellow card) 1'; Frecklington 23' (pen.); Bostwick 90+3'	Report	Preston (red card) 21'; Taylor (yellow card) 26'; Richards 35'; Banks 38'; Lancashire (yellow card) 77'	Stadium: Sincil Bank; Attendance: 8,909; Referee: Anthony Coggins

6 February 2018 31	Accrington Stanley	2–1	Swindon Town	Accrington
19:45 GMT	Kee 25' (pen.), (yellow card) 90+4'; Clark (yellow card) 48'; Jackson 62'; McConville (yellow card) 75'	Report	Dunne (yellow card) 46'; Purkiss (yellow card) 49'; Lancashire (yellow card) 66'; Richards 71' (pen.); Gordon (red card) 74'; Banks (yellow card) 78'	Stadium: Crown Ground; Attendance: 1,243; Referee: Darren Bond

10 February 2018 32	Swindon Town	1–0	Mansfield Town	Swindon
15:00 GMT	Taylor 39'; Banks (yellow card) 57'	Report	Byrom (yellow card) 18'	Stadium: County Ground; Attendance: 6,031; Referee: Kevin Friend

13 February 2018 33	Wycombe Wanderers	3–2	Swindon Town	High Wycombe
19:45 GMT	O'Nien 3'; Mackail-Smith 10'; Akinfenwa 89'	Report	Richards 2'; Taylor 61'; Norris (yellow card) 73'; Elšnik (yellow card) 78'	Stadium: Adams Park; Attendance: 4,863; Referee: Andy Madley

17 February 2018 34	Swindon Town	3–2	Port Vale	Swindon
15:00 GMT	Richards 24', 40'; Menayese (yellow card) 81'; Mullin 88'; Knoyle (yellow card) 89'	Report	Howkins 11'; Montaño 43'; Pope (yellow card) 80'; Hannant (yellow card) 90+1'	Stadium: County Ground; Attendance: 5,713; Referee: Andy Woolmer

24 February 2018 35	Chesterfield	2–1	Swindon Town	Chesterfield
15:00 GMT	O'Grady 2'; Kellett 51'; Reed (yellow card) 82'; Barry (yellow card) 90+4'	Report	Banks (red card) 72'; Robertson 75'; Norris (yellow card) 78'	Stadium: Proact Stadium; Attendance: 4,668; Referee: John Brooks

10 March 2018 36	Swindon Town	0–3	Cheltenham Town	Swindon
15:00 GMT	Dunne (yellow card) 32'	Report	Andrews 41'; Eisa 49', 71'	Stadium: County Ground; Attendance: 6,658; Referee: Tom Nield

17 March 2018 37	Cambridge United	1–3	Swindon Town	Cambridge
15:00 GMT	Ikpeazu 73'	Report	Norris 16'; Richards 62', 84' (pen.)	Stadium: Abbey Stadium; Attendance: 5,123; Referee: Lee Swabey

24 March 2018 38	Exeter City	3–1	Swindon Town	Exeter
15:00 GMT	Moxey (yellow card) 12'; Taylor 33'; Sweeney 44' (pen.); Stockley 87'	Report	Woolery 27'; Taylor (yellow card) 45'; Robertson (yellow card) 90+1'	Stadium: St James Park; Attendance: 4,567; Referee: Lee Collins

30 March 2018 39	Swindon Town	1–1	Morecambe	Swindon
15:00 BST	Norris 55' (pen.); Hussey (yellow card) 60'	Report	Lang 43'	Stadium: County Ground; Attendance: 6,328; Referee: Kevin Johnson

2 April 2018 40	Crawley Town	1–1	Swindon Town	Crawley
15:00 BST	Smith 25', (yellow card) 83'	Report	Richards (yellow card) 70', (goal) 85'	Stadium: Broadfield Stadium; Attendance: 5,008; Referee: Dean Whitestone

7 April 2018 41	Swindon Town	0–0	Carlisle United	Swindon
15:00 BST	Dunne (yellow card) 17'	Report	Twardek (yellow card) 50'; Devitt (yellow card) 88'; Nadesan (yellow card) 90+3'	Stadium: County Ground; Attendance: 5,807; Referee: Brett Huxtable

10 April 2018 42	Swindon Town	2–2	Yeovil Town	Swindon
19:45 BST	Taylor 11', 72'; Banks (yellow card) 43'	Report	Sowunmi (yellow card) 42'; Gobern (yellow card) 55'; Wing 68'; Fisher 89'	Stadium: County Ground; Attendance: 5,709; Referee: Trevor Kettle

14 April 2018 43	Newport County	2–1	Swindon Town	Newport
15:00 BST	Amond 15'; Tozer 35'	Report	Menayese (yellow card) 48' (yellow-red card) 66'; Mullin 62'; Dunne (yellow card) 86'	Stadium: Rodney Parade; Attendance: 3,911; Referee: Charles Breakspear

21 April 2018 44	Swindon Town	0–1	Grimsby Town	Swindon
15:00 BST	Mullin (yellow card) 31'	Report	Hall-Johnson (yellow card) 40'; Rose 45+2', (yellow card) 45+3'	Stadium: County Ground; Attendance: 6,690; Referee: John Brooks

28 April 2018 45	Colchester United	0–0	Swindon Town	Colchester
15:00 BST	Kent (yellow card) 70'; Jackson (yellow card) 82'	Report	Dunne (yellow card) 73'; McDermott (yellow card) 80'; Hussey (yellow card) 90'	Stadium: Colchester Community Stadium; Attendance: 3,687; Referee: Craig Hicks

5 May 2018 46	Swindon Town	3–0	Accrington Stanley	Swindon
15:00 BST	Richards 14'; Anderson 43'; Mullin 55'; Dunne (red card) 85'	Report	Dunne (yellow card) 76' (yellow-red card) 85'	Stadium: County Ground; Attendance: 6,118; Referee: Gavin Ward

=== FA Cup ===
5 November 2017 First round	Dartford	1–5	Swindon Town	Dartford
14:00 GMT	Brown (yellow card) 11'; Sho-Silva 83'	Report	Elšnik 12', 26'; Smith 23'; Linganzi 47'; Mullin 50'	Stadium: Princes Park; Attendance: 2,705; Referee: Darren Drysdale

2 December 2017 Second round	Stevenage	5–2	Swindon Town	Stevenage
15:00 GMT	Samuel 18'; Godden 23'; Pett 45+3'; Smith (yellow card) 67'; Newton 72', 77'; Wilkinson (yellow card) 85'	Report	Linganzi 33'; Taylor 42'; Mullin (yellow card) 81'	Stadium: Broadhall Way; Attendance: 1,883; Referee: Nick Kinseley

=== EFL Cup ===
On 16 June 2017, Swindon Town were drawn away to Norwich City in the first round.

Win Draw Loss

8 August 2017 First round	Norwich City	3–2	Swindon Town	Norwich
19:45 BST	Jerome 27'; Hoolahan 39'; Maddison 42'; Franke (yellow card) 61'; Vrančić (yellow card) 90+4'	Report	Lancashire 25'; Dunne (yellow card) 34'; Mullin 62'; Iandolo (yellow card) 76'; Vigouroux (yellow card) 78'; Thomas (yellow card) 81'	Stadium: Carrow Road; Attendance: 13,166; Referee: Geoff Eltringham

=== EFL Trophy ===
==== Group stage ====
On 12 July 2017, Swindon Town were drawn alongside Bristol Rovers, West Ham United and Wycombe Wanderers in Southern Group C.

Pos	Lge	Team	Pld	W	PW	PL	L	GF	GA	GD	Pts	Qualification
1	L2	Swindon Town (Q)	3	2	0	0	1	7	5	+2	6	Round 2
2	ACA	West Ham United U21 (Q)	3	2	0	0	1	6	5	+1	6	Round 2
3	L1	Bristol Rovers (E)	3	1	0	0	2	8	8	0	3	
4	L2	Wycombe Wanderers (E)	3	1	0	0	2	3	6	−3	3	

Updated to match(es) played on 8 November 2017. Source: EFL.com
(E) Eliminated; (Q) Qualified to the phase indicated

15 August 2017 Group Game 1	Swindon Town	2–3	West Ham United U23s	Swindon
19:45 BST	Norris 47' (pen.); Mullin 74'; Smith (yellow card) 85'	Report	Samuelsen 6'; Makasi 68'; Neufville (yellow card) 79' (yellow-red card) 90+3'; Kemp 86'	Stadium: County Ground; Attendance: 2,082; Referee: John Busby

31 October 2017 Group Game 2	Swindon Town	1–0	Wycombe Wanderers	Swindon
19:45 GMT	Preston 88'; Smith (yellow card) 90+2'	Report	Cowan-Hall (yellow card) 67'; Bean (yellow card) 82'	Stadium: County Ground; Attendance: 1,236; Referee: Kevin Johnson

8 November 2017 Group Game 3	Bristol Rovers	2–4	Swindon Town	Bristol
19:45 GMT	Sweeney 26'; Sercombe 73'	Report	Goddard 17' (pen.); Mullin 37'; Gordon 58'; McDermott (yellow card) 70'; Woolery 87'	Stadium: Memorial Stadium; Attendance: 1,657; Referee: Andre Marriner

==== Knockout stage ====
5 December 2017 Second round	Swindon Town	0–1	Forest Green Rovers	Swindon
19:45 GMT	Anderson (yellow card) 53' (yellow-red card) 90+5'; Taylor (yellow card) 89'	Report	Bennett (yellow card) 28' (yellow-red card) 90+6'; Doidge 79'	Stadium: County Ground; Attendance: 1,320; Referee: Rob Lewis

== Statistics ==
=== Appearances ===
No.	Pos.	Name	League Two		FA Cup		EFL Cup		EFL Trophy		Total		Discipline	
No.	Pos.	Name	Apps	Goals	Apps	Goals	Apps	Goals	Apps	Goals	Apps	Goals	Yellow card	Red card
2	DF	(England) Ben Purkiss	38 (3)	0	2	0	1	0	1	0	42 (3)	0	3	0
4	DF	(England) Matt Preston	21	2	2	0	0	0	2 (1)	1	25 (1)	3	2	1
5	DF	(Scotland) Chris Robertson	13 (5)	1	0	0	1	0	3	0	17 (5)	1	3	0
6	DF	(England) Olly Lancashire	35	1	2	0	1	1	3	0	41	2	5	0
7	FW	(England) Paul Mullin	20 (20)	6	1	1	1	1	3 (1)	2	26 (21)	10	6	0
8	MF	(England) James Dunne	37 (2)	0	2	0	1	0	2 (2)	0	42 (4)	0	12	2
9	FW	(England) Luke Norris	30 (5)	13	0 (1)	0	0	0	2	1	32 (6)	14	7	0
12	GK	(England) Will Henry	0	0	0	0	0	0	1	0	1	0	0	0
14	MF	(England) Ellis Iandolo	7 (5)	1	0	0	0 (1)	0	4	0	11 (6)	1	2	0
16	MF	(Republic of the Congo) Amine Linganzi	19 (6)	2	2	2	0	0	2	0	23 (6)	4	0	0
17	FW	(England) Marc Richards	18 (2)	11	0	0	0	0	0	0	18 (2)	11	2	0
18	MF	(Republic of Ireland) Donal McDermott	7 (10)	1	1	0	0	0	1 (2)	0	9 (12)	1	2	1
19	MF	(Slovenia) Timi Elšnik	18 (4)	3	1	2	0	0	2	0	21 (4)	5	1	0
21	GK	(England) Reice Charles-Cook	22	0	1	0	0	0	2	0	25	0	1	0
22	FW	(England) Kaiyne Woolery	21 (16)	4	1 (1)	0	0	0	3 (1)	1	25 (18)	5	2	0
23	DF	(England) Joe Romanski	1 (1)	0	0	0	0	0	0	0	1 (1)	0	0	0
24	DF	(England) Kyle Knoyle	17 (1)	0	0	0	0	0	3	0	20 (1)	0	1	0
25	DF	(England) Dion Conroy	6 (1)	0	0	0	0	0	1	0	7 (1)	0	1	0
26	MF	(Scotland) Jordan Young	0	0	0	0	0	0	0	0	0	0	0	0
27	FW	(England) Scott Twine	3 (1)	0	0	0	0	0	0	0	3 (1)	0	0	0
28	GK	(England) Stuart Moore	10	0	0	0	0	0	0	0	10	0	0	0
30	FW	(England) Keshi Anderson	36 (1)	5	0	0	0	0	3	0	39 (1)	5	6	1
31	MF	(England) Matt Taylor	34 (4)	6	2	1	0	0	1	0	37 (4)	7	6	0
32	DF	(Wales) Rollin Menayese	13 (1)	0	0	0	0	0	0	0	13 (1)	0	2	1
34	DF	(Northern Ireland) Ryan McGivern	3 (3)	0	0	0	0	0	0	0	3 (3)	0	0	0
35	MF	(England) Jordan Edwards	1	0	0	0	0	0	0	0	1	0	0	0
Players who left the club in August/January transfer window or on loan
1	GK	(Chile) Lawrence Vigouroux	14	0	1	0	1	0	1	0	17	0	1	0
3	DF	(England) Chris Hussey	17 (1)	1	0	0	1	0	1	0	19 (1)	1	3	0
10	MF	(England) John Goddard	8 (5)	1	1 (1)	0	0	0	1 (1)	1	10 (7)	2	0	0
11	MF	(England) James Brophy	2 (4)	0	0 (1)	0	1	0	0 (1)	0	3 (6)	0	0	0
15	MF	(England) Tom Smith	0	0	0	0	1	0	0	0	1	0	0	0
20	MF	(England) Kellan Gordon	12 (14)	3	1 (1)	0	0	0	2 (1)	1	15 (16)	4	2	1
29	MF	(England) Ollie Banks	16 (1)	3	0	0	0	0	0	0	16 (1)	3	3	1
—	MF	(England) Conor Thomas	0 (2)	0	0	0	1	0	0	0	1 (2)	0	1	0
—	FW	(England) Harry Smith	7 (7)	2	1 (1)	1	1	0	0 (2)	0	9 (10)	3	5	0

Last updated: 5 May 2018.
Source: Swindon Town F.C.

=== Top scorers ===
The list is sorted by shirt number when total goals are equal.

Rnk	Pos	No.	Player	League Two	FA Cup	EFL Cup	EFL Trophy	Total
1	FW	9	(England) Luke Norris	13	0	0	1	14
2	FW	17	(England) Marc Richards	11	0	0	0	11
3	FW	7	(England) Paul Mullin	6	1	1	2	10
4	MF	31	(England) Matt Taylor	6	1	0	0	7
5	MF	19	(Slovenia) Timi Elšnik	3	2	0	0	5
5	FW	22	(England) Kaiyne Woolery	4	0	0	1	5
5	FW	30	(England) Keshi Anderson	5	0	0	0	5
7	MF	16	(Republic of the Congo) Amine Linganzi	2	2	0	0	4
7	MF	20	(England) Kellan Gordon	3	0	0	1	4
10	DF	4	(England) Matt Preston	2	0	0	1	3
10	MF	29	(England) Ollie Banks	3	0	0	0	3
10	FW	—	(England) Harry Smith	2	1	0	0	3
13	DF	6	(England) Olly Lancashire	1	0	1	0	2
13	MF	10	(England) John Goddard	1	0	0	1	2
15	DF	3	(England) Chris Hussey	1	0	0	0	1
15	DF	5	(Scotland) Chris Robertson	1	0	0	0	1
15	MF	14	(England) Ellis Iandolo	1	0	0	0	1
15	MF	18	(Republic of Ireland) Donal McDermott	1	0	0	0	1
Own goals				1	0	0	0	1
Total				67	7	2	7	83

Last updated: 5 May 2018.
Source: Swindon Town F.C.

=== Clean sheets ===
The list is sorted by shirt number when total appearances are equal.

Rnk	No.	Player	League Two	FA Cup	EFL Cup	EFL Trophy	Total
1	21	(England) Reice Charles-Cook	6	0	0	1	7
2	1	(Chile) Lawrence Vigouroux	5	0	0	0	5
3	28	(England) Stuart Moore	3	0	0	0	3
4	12	(England) Will Henry	0	0	0	0	0
Total			14	0	0	1	15

Last updated: 5 May 2018.
Source: Swindon Town F.C.

=== Summary ===
Games played	53 (46 League Two) (2 FA Cup) (1 EFL Cup) (4 EFL Trophy)
Games won	23 (20 League Two) (1 FA Cup) (2 EFL Trophy)
Games drawn	8 (8 League Two)
Games lost	22 (18 League Two) (1 FA Cup) (1 EFL Cup) (2 EFL Trophy)
Goals scored	83 (67 League Two) (7 FA Cup) (2 EFL Cup) (7 EFL Trophy)
Goals conceded	80 (65 League Two) (6 FA Cup) (3 EFL Cup) (6 EFL Trophy)
Goal difference	+3 (+2 League Two) (+1 FA Cup) (–1 EFL Cup) (+1 EFL Trophy)
Clean sheets	15 (14 League Two) (1 EFL Trophy)
Yellow cards	79 (69 League Two) (1 FA Cup) (4 EFL Cup) (5 EFL Trophy)
Red cards	8 (7 League Two) (1 EFL Trophy)
Most appearances	(England) Paul Mullin (47 appearances)
Top scorer	(England) Luke Norris (14 goals)
Winning Percentage	Overall: 23/53 (43.40%)

Last updated: 5 May 2018.
Source: Swindon Town F.C.

== Awards ==
=== Player ===
No.	Player	Award	Month	Source
17	(England) Marc Richards	EFL League Two Player of the Month	February	
