= Timi Max Elšnik =

Slovenian footballer (born 1998)

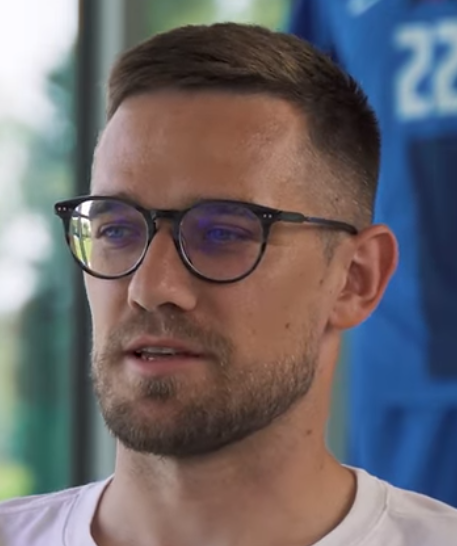
- Elšnik in 2025

Personal information
- Date of birth: 29 April 1998 (age 28)
- Place of birth: Ptuj, Slovenia
- Height: 1.82 m (6 ft 0 in)
- Position: Central midfielder

Team information
- Current team: Red Star Belgrade
- Number: 21

Youth career
- Zlatoličje
- 2008–2015: Aluminij
- 2015–2016: Derby County

Senior career*
Years	Team	Apps	(Gls)
2016–2019	Derby County	0	(0)
2017–2018	→ Swindon Town (loan)	22	(3)
2018–2019	→ Mansfield Town (loan)	19	(3)
2019	→ Northampton Town (loan)	9	(1)
2020–2024	Olimpija Ljubljana	129	(21)
2024–	Red Star Belgrade	70	(8)

International career^{‡}
2014–2015	Slovenia U17 (Note: Appearances in official UEFA competitive matches only; friendly matches are not included.)	9	(0)
2015–2016	Slovenia U19	9	(2)
2019–2021	Slovenia U21	6	(0)
2021–	Slovenia	38	(2)
- * Club domestic league appearances and goals as of 31 October 2026 ‡ National team caps and goals as of 30 September 2026

Timi Max Elšnik (born 29 April 1998) is a Slovenian professional footballer who plays as a central midfielder for Serbian SuperLiga club Red Star Belgrade and the Slovenia national team.

== Club career ==
=== Derby County ===
Elšnik joined the Derby County academy in 2015 at the age of 17. During his first season, he initially played for the under-18 team before progressing to the under-21 squad. At the end of the 2015–16 season, he was named the club's Scholar of the Year. Shortly after signing a new three-year contract with the club in August 2016, he made his first team debut as a substitute against Carlisle United in the EFL Cup, scoring twice in Derby's penalty shoot-out win. He was released by Derby in July 2019.

==== Loans to Swindon Town, Mansfield Town and Northampton Town ====
On 31 August 2017, Elšnik signed on a season-long loan for Swindon Town along with Derby teammate Kellan Gordon. Two days later, Elšnik made his Swindon debut during their 4–1 home defeat against Barnet, featuring for the entire 90 minutes.

On 31 August 2018, Elšnik signed on a season-long loan for Mansfield Town. Four days later, Elšnik made his Mansfield debut during their 2–1 away win against Lincoln City in the EFL Trophy, featuring for the entire 90 minutes. On 30 October 2018, Elšnik was brought back into the Mansfield side, starting the game against Crewe Alexandra. He scored two goals ensuring a 3–0 win for Mansfield.

In January 2019, Mansfield activated a clause to terminate the loan spell during the winter transfer window. Shortly after his return to Derby, he was loaned to Northampton Town until the end of the season.

=== Olimpija Ljubljana ===
In January 2020, Elšnik returned to his home country and signed with Olimpija Ljubljana. In December 2020, after extending his contract with the club, president Milan Mandarić appointed him as the team captain at only 22 years of age. With Olimpija, Elšnik won the Slovenian league title in the 2022–23 season and the Slovenian Cup in the 2020–21 and 2022–23 seasons.

== International career ==
Elšnik has represented Slovenia at the under-17, under-18, under-19, and under-21 levels. He was the captain of the under-21 team at the 2021 UEFA European Under-21 Championship.

He made his senior debut on 8 October 2021 in the 2022 FIFA World Cup qualification match against Malta, replacing Jasmin Kurtić late in the game. In June 2024, Elšnik was called up to the squad for UEFA Euro 2024 by Slovenian coach Matjaž Kek. He appeared as a starter in all four Slovenia matches at the tournament.

== Career statistics ==
=== Club ===
As of 5 October 2023

Appearances and goals by club, season and competition
Club	Season	League			National cup (Note: Includes FA Cup, Slovenian Cup)		Continental		Other (Note: Includes EFL Cup, EFL Trophy)		Total	
Club	Season	Division	Apps	Goals	Apps	Goals	Apps	Goals	Apps	Goals	Apps	Goals
Derby County	2015–16	Championship	0	0	0	0	—		0	0	0	0
Derby County	2016–17	Championship	0	0	0	0	—		2	0	2	0
Derby County	2017–18	Championship	0	0	0	0	—		1	0	1	0
Derby County	2018–19	Championship	0	0	0	0	—		0	0	0	0
Derby County	Total		0	0	0	0	0	0	3	0	3	0
Swindon Town (loan)	2017–18	League Two	22	3	1	2	—		2	0	25	5
Mansfield Town (loan)	2018–19	League Two	19	3	1	0	—		4	1	24	4
Northampton Town (loan)	2018–19	League Two	9	1	0	0	—		0	0	9	1
Olimpija Ljubljana	2019–20	Slovenian PrvaLiga	11	3	—		—		—		11	3
Olimpija Ljubljana	2020–21	Slovenian PrvaLiga	31	3	2	1	2 (Note: Appearances in UEFA Europa League)	0	—		35	4
Olimpija Ljubljana	2021–22	Slovenian PrvaLiga	21	1	1	0	4 (Note: Appearances in UEFA Europa Conference League)	0	—		26	1
Olimpija Ljubljana	2022–23	Slovenian PrvaLiga	33	7	4	2	3	0	—		40	9
Olimpija Ljubljana	2023–24	Slovenian PrvaLiga	8	1	0	0	9 (Note: Five appearances and three goals in UEFA Champions League, two appearances in UEFA Europa League, two appearances in UEFA Europa Conference League)	3	—		17	4
Olimpija Ljubljana	Total		104	15	7	3	18	3	0	0	129	21
Career total			154	22	9	5	18	3	9	1	190	31

=== International ===
As of match played 29 September 2026

Appearances and goals by national team and year
National team	Year	Apps	Goals
Slovenia
Slovenia	2021	1	0
Slovenia	2022	1	0
Slovenia	2023	8	0
Slovenia	2024	15	1
Slovenia	2025	9	1
Slovenia	2026	4	0
Total		38	2

Scores and results list Slovenia's goal tally first, score column indicates score after each Elšnik goal.

List of international goals scored by Timi Max Elšnik
No.	Date	Venue	Opponent	Score	Result	Competition
1	26 March 2024	Stožice Stadium, Ljubljana, Slovenia	Portugal	2–0	2–0	Friendly
2	18 November 2025	Strawberry Arena, Solna, Sweden	Sweden	1–0	1–1	2026 FIFA World Cup qualification

== Honours ==
Olimpija Ljubljana

- Slovenian PrvaLiga: 2022–23
- Slovenian Cup: 2020–21, 2022–23

Red Star Belgrade

- Serbian SuperLiga: 2024–25, 2025–26
- Serbian Cup: 2024–25, 2025–26
