= Jordan Edwards (footballer) =

English footballer (born 1999)

Personal information
- Full name: Jordan Joseph Terence Edwards
- Date of birth: 26 October 1999 (age 27)
- Place of birth: Reading, England
- Position: Midfielder

Team information
- Current team: Hanwell Town

Youth career
- Southampton
- Bristol City
- 2016–2018: Swindon Town

Senior career*
Years	Team	Apps	(Gls)
2018–2019	Swindon Town	1	(0)
2018	→ Chippenham Town (loan)	3	(0)
2019	→ Marlow (loan)	11	(2)
2019–2020	Basingstoke Town	11	(1)
2020	Marlow	7	(1)
2020–2021	Hungerford Town	8	(0)
2021–2022	Hartley Wintney	34	(12)
2022–24	Chesham United	79	(24)
2024-	Hanwell Town	33	(22)
- * Club domestic league appearances and goals as of 16:13, 10 Feb 2023 (UTC)

Jordan Joseph Terence Edwards (born 26 October 1999) is an English semi-professional footballer who plays as a midfielder for Hanwell Town.

== Career ==
On 5 May 2018, Edwards made his professional debut for Swindon Town during their 3–0 home victory over Accrington Stanley, featuring for 81 minutes before being replaced by Timi Elšnik. Prior to his Swindon debut, Edwards spent time on trial at Championship side Norwich City in January 2018. Following his league debut, Edwards was rewarded with his first professional contract ahead of the 2018–19 campaign. On 10 October 2018, Edwards joined Chippenham Town on a three-month loan. In January 2019, Edwards joined Marlow and scored his first goal in a 1–1 draw with Tooting & Mitcham United.

Following his departure from Swindon, Edwards joined Basingstoke Town before ending the 2019–20 campaign back at Marlow. He went onto have spells with Hungerford Town in the National League South and Hartley Wintney, eventually joining Chesham United during the pinnacle of the 2021–22 campaign, winning. After winning the 2023-24 Southern League Premier Division South title with Chesham United, Edwards made the move to Hanwell Town during the summer of 2024.

== Career statistics ==
As of match played 22 April 2023.

Club	Season	League			FA Cup		League Cup		Other		Total	
Club	Season	Division	Apps	Goals	Apps	Goals	Apps	Goals	Apps	Goals	Apps	Goals
Swindon Town	2017–18	League Two	1	0	0	0	0	0	0	0	1	0
Swindon Town	2018–19	League Two	0	0	0	0	0	0	0	0	0	0
Swindon Town	Total		1	0	0	0	0	0	0	0	1	0
Chippenham Town (loan)	2018–19	National League South	3	0	—		—		—		3	0
Marlow (loan)	2018–19	Isthmian League South Central Division	11	2	—		—		1 (Note: Appearance in the Isthmian League South Central Division play-offs)	0	12	2
Basingstoke Town	2019–20	Southern League Division One South	11	1	0	0	—		2 (Note: Appearances in the FA Trophy)	0	13	1
Marlow	2019–20	Isthmian League South Central Division	7	1	—		—		—		7	1
Hungerford Town	2020–21	National League South	8	0	0	0	—		1	0	9	0
Hartley Wintney	2021–22	Southern League Premier Division South	34	12	1	0	—		3 (Note: Two appearances in the FA Trophy, one in the Southern League Cup)	0	38	12
Chesham United	2021–22	Southern League Premier Division South	5	2	—		—		—		5	2
Chesham United	2022–23	Southern League Premier Division South	29	9	2	0	—		2	1	33	10
Chesham United	2023-24	Southern League Premier Division South	35	11	6	1			2	1	41	12
Chesham United	Total		34	11	2	0	—		2	1	38	40
Career total			109	27	3	0	0	0	9	1	121	28
