= Luke Norris (footballer) =

English footballer (born 1993)

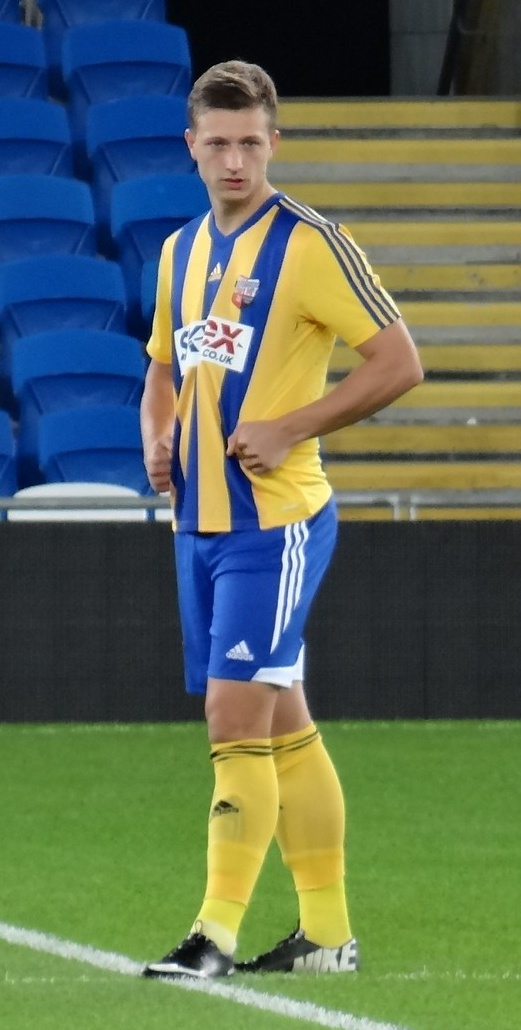
- Norris playing for Brentford's development team in 2013

Personal information
- Full name: Luke Michael Norris
- Date of birth: 3 June 1993 (age 33)
- Place of birth: Stevenage, England
- Height: 1.82 m (6 ft 0 in)
- Position: Forward

Team information
- Current team: Wealdstone (on loan from Boreham Wood)
- Number: 7

Youth career
- 2001–2006: Luton Town
- 2010: Hitchin Town
- 2010–2011: Brentford

Senior career*
Years	Team	Apps	(Gls)
2011–2014	Brentford	3	(0)
2012–2013	→ Boreham Wood (loan)	7	(3)
2013–2014	→ Northampton Town (loan)	10	(4)
2014	→ Dagenham & Redbridge (loan)	19	(4)
2014–2016	Gillingham	70	(14)
2016–2018	Swindon Town	74	(17)
2018–2021	Colchester United	83	(20)
2021–2023	Stevenage	104	(31)
2023–2025	Tranmere Rovers	32	(5)
2025–	Boreham Wood	18	(5)
2026–	→ Wealdstone (loan)	14	(3)
- * Club domestic league appearances and goals as of 22:01, 10 November 2026 (UTC)

Luke Michael Norris (born 3 June 1993) is an English professional footballer who plays as a forward for National League club Wealdstone, on loan from Boreham Wood.

Having played in the youth academies at Luton Town, Hitchin Town and Brentford, Norris made his debut in the Brentford first team in April 2011 and signed his first professional contract with the club later that month. He made five first-team appearances during his four years at Brentford, during which he spent time on loan at three clubs; Boreham Wood, Northampton Town and Dagenham & Redbridge. He signed for League One club Gillingham in July 2014 and spent two years there, scoring 15 goals in 79 appearances.

Norris signed for Swindon Town for an undisclosed fee in August 2016, making 80 appearances and scoring 20 goals in his two seasons there. He transferred to League Two club Colchester United in June 2018, joining the club for an undisclosed fee. After 23 goals in 96 appearances over two and a half years at Colchester, Norris joined his hometown club Stevenage in January 2021, where he scored 37 times in 122 appearances, helping the club earn promotion during the 2022–23 League Two season. He joined Tranmere Rovers on a one-year contract in June 2023.

== Early life ==
Born in Stevenage, Hertfordshire, Norris grew up in Bedwell and attended Marriotts School in Stevenage. He was known as Luke Hacker until February 2012.

== Career ==
=== Early career ===
Norris played in the Luton Town academy from the age of eight up until the age of 13, when he was released by the club. After leaving school, he began playing in the youth system at Hitchin Town.

=== Brentford ===
After four months at Hitchin Town, Norris was invited for a trial at League One club Brentford by academy manager Darren Sarll. The trial was successful and he signed a two-year scholarship with Brentford in the summer of 2010. Norris was named in the senior squad for the first time for a league match versus Southampton on 30 April 2011. Beginning the match on the substitutes' bench, he made his professional debut when he came on as a 75th-minute substitute for Jeffrey Schlupp during the 2–0 defeat. Norris sustained an injury in pre-season, which kept him out for the majority of the 2011–12 season. He signed his first professional contract in April 2012, a one-year deal to be part of Brentford's Development Squad. During the 2012–13 season, Norris did not play in the first team, although was Brentford's top scorer in the Professional Development League 2 South, scoring 10 times in 18 appearances.

Norris signed a further one-year contract with Brentford's Development Squad in June 2013. He made his first starting appearance for Brentford in a 5–3 victory against AFC Wimbledon in the Football League Trophy, scoring his first senior goal in the match. Norris made three appearances and scored one goal for the Brentford first team during the 2013–14 season, in addition to scoring one goal in five appearances for the Development Squad. He attracted transfer interest in May 2014 from League Two clubs Stevenage, Dagenham & Redbridge and Northampton Town and it was reported on 21 June 2014 that he had 48 hours to decide his future. Norris left the club on 3 July 2014, after turning down a new contract, later saying "after four years it was just time for me to move on. I have a lot to be thankful to Brentford for, as they took a risk on me at 16 and gave me a chance".

==== Loan to Boreham Wood ====
Norris joined Conference South club Boreham Wood on a one-month loan in December 2012 and made his debut in a 0–0 draw with Truro City on 8 December, replacing Cliff Akurang on 65 minutes. Norris scored his first goal for the club with the opening goal in a 1–1 draw with Staines Town on 1 January 2013. Norris' loan was extended until the end of the month on 4 January 2013. Norris scored both goals in a 2–1 victory against Maidenhead United on 9 January. The match proved to be the last match of the loan agreement, as he returned to Brentford shortly afterwards, having scored three goals in seven appearances. Looking back on his time with the club, Norris said "it's been very good, it's given me a lot more experience in the more physical side of football compared to where I am. It's nice to get some competitive games under my belt and hopefully I've done well here for the club".

==== Loan to Northampton Town ====
Norris moved to League Two club Northampton Town on loan on 18 October 2013, on an agreement until 16 November 2013. The following day he started in Northampton's match against Dagenham & Redbridge and scored the first league goal of his career in a 2–2 draw. Having scored five goals in six games, Norris' loan was extended until 4 January 2014. The return of Clive Platt and Izale McLeod to the team in late November saw Norris' goalscoring run end, as he lost his starting place and was relegated to the substitutes' bench. Norris' final appearance for Northampton came with a start in a 0–0 draw with Portsmouth on 29 December 2013. He was forced off after 34 minutes with an injury and returned to Brentford on 2 January 2014. During his time at Northampton, Norris made 12 appearances and scored five goals.

==== Loan to Dagenham & Redbridge ====
Norris joined League Two club Dagenham & Redbridge on a one-month youth loan on 23 January 2014. He made his debut in a league match against Scunthorpe United on 25 January 2014. Norris replaced Luke Howell just prior to half time and scored an 89th-minute equaliser as Dagenham came back from 3–0 down to draw the match 3–3. In the following game, Norris made his first Dagenham start and scored the equaliser in a 1–1 draw with Southend United. Norris' loan was extended by a further month on 24 February 2014 and then extended again on 24 March 2014, until the end of the 2013–14 season. Norris made 19 appearances and scored four goals during the loan. Upon returning to Griffin Park, Brentford academy director Ose Aibangee said "Luke has now proved he can score goals at League Two level and contribute in other ways".

=== Gillingham ===
Norris joined League One club Gillingham on 3 July 2014, with a compensation deal being agreed with Brentford six months later. He debuted for Gillingham in the club's 2–1 away victory against Yeovil Town in the Football League Cup on 12 August 2014. Norris scored his first goal for Gillingham in a 1–0 win against Stevenage in the Football League Trophy on 2 September 2014, his goal coming from a first-half penalty. He played 44 times during his first season at the club, scoring seven goals.

Having scored three times in 15 appearances during the first two months of the 2015–16 season, Norris suffered an ankle injury in a 1–0 away victory at Crewe Alexandra on 17 October 2015. After visiting a consultant, he was ruled out of the first team for between six and ten weeks after it was discovered that a part of his ligament had separated from his ankle bone. Gillingham manager Justin Edinburgh noted that Norris had been "a pivotal part" of the club's start to the season and that they had missed him in the games since his injury. Norris returned to the first team in December 2015 and ended the season with eight goals in 35 appearances.

=== Swindon Town ===
Norris signed for League One club Swindon Town on 6 August 2016, joining the club on a three-year contract for an undisclosed fee, later reported to be in the region of £150,000. He made his Swindon debut in a 2–2 EFL Cup draw with Queens Park Rangers on 10 August 2016, which Swindon ultimately lost 4–2 on a penalty shootout. He scored his first goal for Swindon on his 18th appearance for the club, in a 1–1 draw against Exeter City in the EFL Trophy on 8 November 2016. Norris scored six goals in 46 appearances during the 2016–17 season as Swindon were relegated to League Two after finishing the season in 22nd position. He scored 14 times in all competitions during the 2017–18 season, the first time he had reached double figures in his seasonal goal tally. Norris made 38 appearances that season, which ended early after sustaining a dislocated shoulder in a 1–1 draw with Crawley Town on 2 April 2018. It was the fourth time that season that Norris' shoulder had dislocated and he subsequently underwent shoulder surgery at the end of the season.

=== Colchester United ===
Despite Swindon activating a clause to extend Norris' contract in May 2018, he signed for fellow League Two club Colchester United on a three-year deal on 27 June 2018. As Swindon had exercised the option to extend his contract, the transfer commanded a fee, which was undisclosed. He scored on his debut in Colchester's 2–2 EFL Cup draw with Cheltenham Town on 14 August 2018. Norris scored eight goals in his first 13 appearances for Colchester, although did not score again beyond October 2018 that season as Colchester finished in 8th position in the league standings, a point outside of the play-offs places. He scored 11 times in 42 matches during the 2019–20 season, helping Colchester to a 6th-place finish in League Two, consequently making the 2020 League Two play-offs. Norris played in both play-off semi-final matches against Exeter City in June 2020 as Colchester were defeated 3–2 on aggregate.

=== Stevenage ===
Norris joined League Two club Stevenage on 5 January 2021, on a contract until the end of the 2020–21 season. He debuted for his hometown club as a second-half substitute in a 2–0 defeat to Swansea City in the FA Cup on 9 January 2021. Norris scored his first goal for Stevenage in the club's 2–2 home draw with Morecambe on 6 February 2021. Having ended the season by scoring six goals in 10 matches, Norris signed a one-year contract extension with Stevenage on 28 April 2021, keeping him contracted to the club until the end of the 2021–22 season.

Norris scored 16 times in 51 appearances during the 2021–22 season, his highest seasonal tally for both goals and appearances. He was subsequently named as Stevenage's Player of the Year for the 2021–22 season. Norris was included in the club's retained list for the 2022–23 season, finishing that season as the club's joint highest goalscorer with 14 goals in 48 appearances as Stevenage earned promotion into League One after finishing in second place in League Two.

=== Tranmere Rovers ===
On 20 June 2023, Norris returned to League Two, joining Tranmere Rovers on a one-year deal. He signed a new one-year contract at the end of the season.

On 6 May 2025, the club announced the player would be released in June when his contract expired.

=== Boreham Wood ===
On 24 July 2025, Norris returned to National League side Boreham Wood, over twelve years on from a loan spell with the club.

=== Wealdstone ===
On 31 July 2026, Norris signed for National League club Wealdstone on a season long loan. On 8 August, he scored on his debut for the club in a 2-2 draw away at AFC Fylde.

== Career statistics ==
As of 10 November 2026

Appearances and goals by club, season and competition
Club	Season	League			FA Cup		League Cup		Other		Total	
Club	Season	Division	Apps	Goals	Apps	Goals	Apps	Goals	Apps	Goals	Apps	Goals
Brentford	2010–11	League One	1	0	0	0	0	0	0	0	1	0
Brentford	2011–12	League One	1	0	0	0	0	0	0	0	1	0
Brentford	2013–14	League One	1	0	0	0	1	0	1 (Note: Appearance(s) in EFL Trophy)	1	3	1
Brentford	Total		3	0	0	0	1	0	1	1	5	1
Boreham Wood (loan)	2012–13	Conference South	7	3	0	0	—		0	0	7	3
Northampton Town (loan)	2013–14	League Two	10	4	2	1	0	0	0	0	12	5
Dagenham & Redbridge (loan)	2013–14	League Two	19	4	0	0	0	0	0	0	19	4
Gillingham	2014–15	League One	37	6	0	0	2	0	5	1	44	7
Gillingham	2015–16	League One	33	8	0	0	1	0	1	0	35	8
Gillingham	Total		70	14	0	0	3	0	6	1	79	15
Swindon Town	2016–17	League One	39	4	2	0	1	0	4	2	46	6
Swindon Town	2017–18	League Two	35	13	1	0	0	0	2	1	38	14
Swindon Town	Total		74	17	3	0	1	0	6	3	84	20
Colchester United	2018–19	League Two	34	7	0	0	1	1	1	0	36	8
Colchester United	2019–20	League Two	32	9	1	0	5	1	4 (Note: Three appearances and one goal in EFL Trophy, two appearances in EFL League Two play-offs)	1	42	11
Colchester United	2020–21	League Two	17	4	0	0	0	0	1	0	18	4
Colchester United	Total		83	20	1	0	6	2	6	1	96	23
Stevenage	2020–21	League Two	22	7	1	0	0	0	0	0	23	7
Stevenage	2021–22	League Two	44	14	2	1	2	0	3	1	51	16
Stevenage	2022–23	League Two	38	10	4	3	1	1	5	0	48	14
Stevenage	Total		104	31	7	4	3	1	8	1	122	37
Tranmere Rovers	2023–24	League Two	19	4	1	1	1	1	0	0	21	6
Tranmere Rovers	2024–25	League Two	13	1	1	0	1	0	1	0	16	1
Tranmere Rovers	Total		32	5	2	1	2	1	1	0	37	7
Boreham Wood	2025–26	National League	18	5	3	0	—		5 (Note: Includes FA Trophy and National League Cup)	2	26	7
Wealdstone (loan)	2026–27	National League	14	3	2	1	—		0	0	16	4
Career total			435	106	20	7	16	3	32	9	503	126

== Honours ==
Stevenage

- EFL League Two runner-up: 2022–23

Individual

- Stevenage Player of the Year: 2021–22
