= Keshi Anderson =

English footballer (born 1995)

Personal information
- Full name: Keshi Stuart Oluyinka Adetokunboh Anderson
- Date of birth: 6 April 1995 (age 31)
- Place of birth: Luton, England
- Height: 5 ft 9 in (1.75 m)
- Positions: Winger; striker

Team information
- Current team: Portsmouth
- Number: 21

Youth career
- Watford
- Barton Rovers

Senior career*
Years	Team	Apps	(Gls)
2013–2015	Barton Rovers		(26)
2015–2018	Crystal Palace	0	(0)
2015	→ Doncaster Rovers (loan)	7	(3)
2016–2017	→ Bolton Wanderers (loan)	8	(1)
2017	→ Northampton Town (loan)	14	(3)
2017–2018	→ Swindon Town (loan)	22	(4)
2018–2020	Swindon Town	78	(11)
2020–2023	Blackpool	58	(6)
2023–2026	Birmingham City	76	(8)
2026–	Portsmouth	9	(1)
- * Club domestic league appearances and goals as of 20:50, 14 October 2026 (UTC)

Keshi Stuart Oluyinka Adetokunboh Anderson (born 6 April 1995) is an English professional footballer who plays as a winger and striker for Portsmouth.

After playing youth football with Watford and non-League football with Barton Rovers, Anderson turned professional with Crystal Palace in 2015. He did not make any appearances for the Palace first team, and spent loan spells with Doncaster Rovers, Bolton Wanderers, Northampton Town and Swindon Town. He signed permanently for Swindon in January 2018, leaving the club in June 2020 to sign for Blackpool. He later played for Birmingham City and Portsmouth.

== Career ==
After spending time with the Watford Academy, Anderson began his senior career with Barton Rovers, scoring 32 goals in 53 games in all competitions, including 26 league goals. After scoring a hat-trick in six minutes while on trial at Brentford against Crystal Palace, the latter club signed him in February 2015. He scored on his debut for the Palace under-21 team, and a day later Palace manager Alan Pardew stated that Anderson would be in his senior squad for the forthcoming game away at Leicester City on 7 February.

Anderson joined Doncaster Rovers on a one-month loan on 24 September 2015 and made his Football League debut against Sheffield United a couple of days later. In October, the loan was extended until January 2016. On 21 November, Anderson suffered a broken leg in a match against Rochdale that would keep him out for nine months.

On 31 August 2016, Anderson moved to EFL League One side Bolton Wanderers on a season-long loan deal. He scored on his Bolton debut three days later as the Wanderers came from behind to draw 1–1 with Southend United at the Macron Stadium. Crystal Palace recalled Anderson on 16 January 2017, and he signed for Northampton Town on loan the next day.

On 31 August 2017, Anderson joined EFL League Two side Swindon Town on loan until January 2018. Two days later, he made his Swindon debut in their 4–1 home defeat against Barnet, featuring for 66 minutes before being replaced by Kaiyne Woolery. On 16 September 2017, Anderson scored his first goal for Swindon during their 3–2 home victory over Stevenage, doubling the hosts' lead in the 13th minute. After the conclusion of his loan period, Anderson joined Swindon on a permanent transfer on 16 January 2018.

A new contract was offered by manager Richie Wellens at the end of Swindon Town's League Two title-winning 2019–20 season; however, Anderson declined the offer and took to social media to announce that he was leaving the club when his contract expired.

Anderson signed for Blackpool on 29 June 2020 on a two-year contract, including an option for the club to extend the deal by a further year. He scored his first goal for the club in an EFL Trophy tie against Accrington Stanley on 6 October 2020.

On 22 July 2023, after a successful trial period, Anderson signed a one-year deal with EFL Championship club Birmingham City. At the end of the 2023–24 season, the club triggered their option for a 12-month contract extension. In October 2024, Anderson's contract was extended for a further year, to run until 2026.

He left the club by mutual consent in January 2026. Later that month he signed for Portsmouth.

On 6 April 2026, his 31st birthday, Anderson scored his first Portsmouth goal on his first start for the club, in a 2-2 draw with fellow relegation strugglers Oxford United.

== Personal life ==
Anderson is eligible to represent either Nigeria or England internationally.

== Career statistics ==
As of match played 14 October 2026

Appearance and goals by club, season and competition
Club	Season	League			FA Cup		EFL Cup		Other		Total	
Club	Season	Division	Apps	Goals	Apps	Goals	Apps	Goals	Apps	Goals	Apps	Goals
Crystal Palace	2015–16	Premier League	0	0	0	0	0	0	0	0	0	0
Crystal Palace	2016–17	Premier League	0	0	0	0	0	0	0	0	0	0
Crystal Palace	2017–18	Premier League	0	0	0	0	0	0	0	0	0	0
Crystal Palace	Total		0	0	0	0	0	0	0	0	0	0
Doncaster Rovers (loan)	2015–16	League One	7	3	1	0	0	0	1 (Note: Appearance in Football League Trophy)	0	9	3
Bolton Wanderers (loan)	2016–17	League One	8	1	1	0	0	0	1 (Note: Appearance(s) in EFL Trophy)	0	10	1
Northampton Town (loan)	2016–17	League One	14	3	0	0	0	0	0	0	14	3
Swindon Town (loan)	2017–18	League Two	22	4	0	0	0	0	3	0	25	4
Swindon Town	2017–18	League Two	15	1	0	0	0	0	0	0	15	1
Swindon Town	2018–19	League Two	43	4	2	0	1	0	2	1	48	5
Swindon Town	2019–20	League Two	20	6	0	0	1	0	1	0	22	6
Swindon Town	Total		78	11	2	0	2	0	3	1	85	12
Blackpool	2020–21	League One	17	2	1	0	1	0	7 (Note: Four appearances and one goal in EFL Trophy, three appearances in League One play-offs)	1	26	3
Blackpool	2021–22	Championship	32	4	1	1	2	1	–		35	6
Blackpool	2022–23	Championship	9	0	0	0	0	0	0	0	9	0
Blackpool	Total		58	6	2	1	3	1	7	1	70	9
Birmingham City	2023–24	Championship	20	0	3	0	1	0	—		24	0
Birmingham City	2024–25	League One	37	7	3	0	2	0	6	2	48	9
Birmingham City	2025–26	Championship	19	1	0	0	1	0	—		20	1
Birmingham City	Total		76	8	6	0	4	0	6	2	92	10
Portsmouth	2025–26	Championship	7	1	0	0	0	0	—		7	1
Portsmouth	2026–27	Championship	2	0	0	0	0	0	—		2	0
Portsmouth	Total		9	1	0	0	0	0	0	0	9	1
Career total			272	36	12	1	9	1	21	4	314	43

== Honours ==
Swindon Town

- EFL League Two: 2019–20

Blackpool

- EFL League One play-offs: 2021

Birmingham City

- EFL League One: 2024–25
- EFL Trophy runner-up: 2024–25
