= 2011–12 Swindon Town F.C. season =

Swindon Town F.C.
2011–12 season
- Chairman: Jeremy Wray
- Manager: Paolo Di Canio
- Ground: County Ground, Swindon
- League Two: 1st (champions)
- FA Cup: 4th Round (Knocked out by Leicester City)
- League Cup: 2nd Round (Knocked out by Southampton)
- FL Trophy: Runners-up (Lost to Chesterfield)
- Top goalscorer: League: Paul Benson (12); Alan Connell (12); All: Alan Connell (13)
- Highest home attendance: 13,238 vs. Wigan Athletic, 8 January 2012
- Lowest home attendance: 4,329 vs AFC Wimbledon, 8 November 2011
Home colours	Away colours	Third colours

The 2011–12 season was Swindon Town's first season in the League Two since 2006–07. Under the management of former AC Milan, Lazio, Celtic, Sheffield Wednesday and West Ham United footballer Paolo Di Canio, Swindon were successful in winning their first trophy since 1996 after securing the League Two championship. Town were also runners-up in the Football League Trophy, losing to Chesterfield at Wembley Stadium. The club also competed in the FA Cup, beating Premier League outfit Wigan Athletic and the League Cup.

== League data ==
Pos	Team	Pld	W	D	L	GF	GA	GD	Pts	Promotion, qualification or relegation
1	Swindon Town (C, P)	46	29	6	11	75	32	+43	93	Promotion to Football League One
2	Shrewsbury Town (P)	46	26	10	10	66	41	+25	88	Promotion to Football League One
3	Crawley Town (P)	46	23	15	8	76	54	+22	84	Promotion to Football League One
4	Southend United	46	25	8	13	77	48	+29	83	Qualification for League Two play-offs (Note: Four teams play for one spot and promotion to Football League One.)
5	Torquay United	46	23	12	11	63	50	+13	81	Qualification for League Two play-offs

Updated to match(es) played on 5 May 2012. Source: BBC Sport
Rules for classification: 1) Points; 2) Goal difference; 3) Number of goals scored
(C) Champions; (P) Promoted
Notes:

Round	1	2	3	4	5	6	7	8	9	10	11	12	13	14	15	16	17	18	19	20	21	22	23	24	25	26	27	28	29	30	31	32	33	34	35	36	37	38	39	40	41	42	43	44	45	46
Ground	H	A	A	H	A	H	H	A	A	H	A	H	A	A	H	H	A	A	H	A	H	A	A	H	A	H	A	H	A	H	H	H	A	H	H	A	H	H	A	A	H	H	A	A	H	A
Result	W	L	L	L	L	W	W	W	L	W	L	D	W	W	W	D	W	D	W	D	W	L	W	W	W	W	W	W	W	W	W	W	L	W	W	L	W	D	W	W	W	W	L	L	W	D
Position	1	9	16	19	21	18	13	10	14	10	11	13	11	10	7	7	6	7	6	6	5	7	5	4	4	4	2	4	3	1	1	1	1	1	1	1	1	1	1	1	1	1	1	1	1	1

Updated to match(es) played on 14 April 2012. Source: swindontownfc.co.uk
A = Away; H = Home; W = Win; D = Draw; L = Loss

== Kits and sponsors ==
Adidas

Samsung

Supplier: Adidas
Sponsor(s): Samsung (Home), EA Sports (Away), The People (F.A. Cup)

Home	Away	F.A. Cup Home Kit	F.A. Cup Away Kit

Source: Swindon Town Official Online Store

== Overview and results ==
=== Pre-season ===
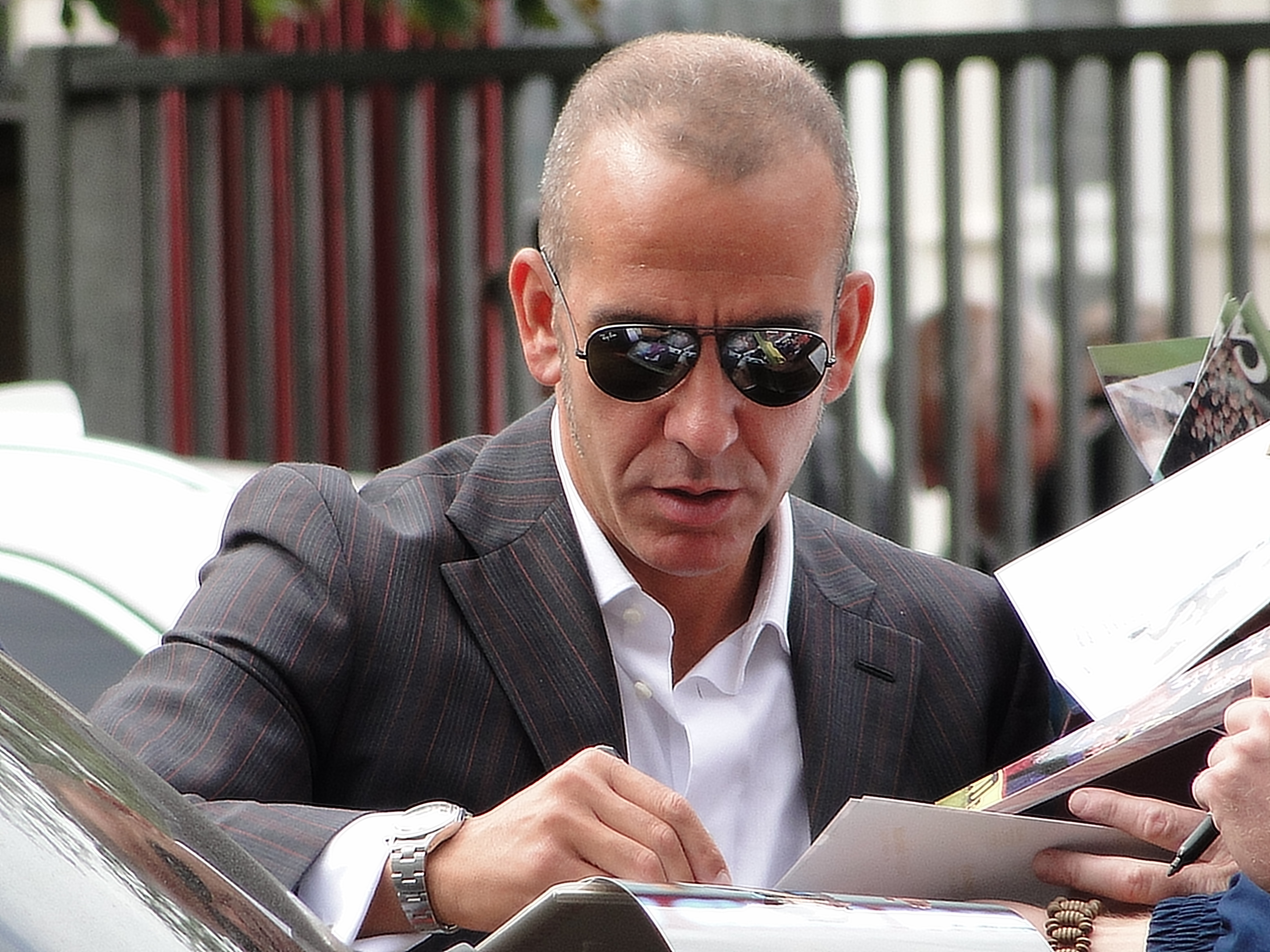
Paolo Di Canio became Swindon manager in May 2011.

The club's early pre-season was dominated by reports of who would replace Paul Hart as the new manager of Swindon Town. Hart had left the club before the end of the 2010–11 season after the club's relegation had been confirmed. Hart was replaced by youth team manager Paul Bodin had managed the club on a caretaker basis. Previously, chairman Andrew Fitton also resigned in April and was replaced by fellow board member Jeremy Wray who was immediately placed with the responsibility of appointing a new manager.

Names mentioned for the Town job included Bodin, George Burley, Paul Trollope, Dietmar Hamann, John Hughes, Gus McPherson and Paolo Di Canio. In early May the tabloid newspapers were linking Di Canio with an unlikely move to the club. Di Canio had enjoyed a popular but sometimes controversial career in England with Sheffield Wednesday and with West Ham United where he became a cult figure. On 20 May, the appointment was confirmed with fellow Italians Fabrizio Piccareta (assistant), Claudio Donatelli (fitness) and Domenico Doardo (goalkeeping) joining the club as Di Canio's coaching staff, caretaker manager Paul Bodin reverted to his position as youth team manager.

Before the arrival of Di Canio, interim chairman Jeremy Wray announced that he would be arranging one-to-one meetings with the entire playing squad to discuss their futures. The outcome was a mass clear-out but it began with players initially declaring an interest in remaining at the club. David Prutton talked of "putting things right" before leaving to join Sheffield Wednesday shortly afterwards. Meanwhile, Scott Cuthbert told the press that he would be "delighted" to remain at Swindon but the club decided against triggering a clause on his contract to extend his deal but were rumoured to be open in renegotiating a new deal but Cuthbert later joined Leyton Orient. Former Swindon Town Player of the Year Jonathan Douglas looked set to sign a new contract but eventually turned it down for a move to Brentford.

Swindon Town returned to pre-season on 29 June 2011. During the summer, Swindon spent 10 days in Italy at a training camp in Norcia, Umbria. During the course of the week Town played two friendlies against local select sides Norcia XI and Marche XI. Upon returning to England, Swindon visited local Non-League clubs Swindon Supermarine and Cirencester Town. Both fixtures concluded in 4–0 victories for Swindon Town. The club concluded their Pre-Season with a 1–2 loss to Football League Championship outfit Reading.

10 July 2011 Italy Training Camp	Norcia XI	0–11	Swindon Town	Norcia
19:30		Report	Devera; De Vita; Ritchie; Kennedy (pen); J. Smith; Amankwaah; Bodin; Ferry

13 July 2011 Italy Training Camp	Marche XI	0–5	Swindon Town	Norcia
19:30		Report	Ritchie; Risser; Esajas; Bodin

19 July 2011 Friendly	Swindon Supermarine	0–4	Swindon Town	Webbs Wood Stadium
19:45 (moved back to 20:00 due to crowd congestion)		Report	J. Smith 13'; De Vita 25'; Esajas 67'; Kennedy 75'

25 July 2011 Friendly	Cirencester Town	0–4	Swindon Town	Corinium Stadium
19:45		Report	Ritchie 34'; Greaves (og) 40'; Kerrouche 53'; Connell 75'

30 July 2011 Friendly	Swindon Town	1–2	Reading	County Ground
15:00	Pearce (og) 19'	Report	Long 54'; Manset 71'	Attendance: 4,820; Referee: Roger East (Wiltshire)

=== League Two ===
The fixtures for the 2011–12 season were announced on 17 June at 09:00 BST, and revealed that Swindon will begin their League Two campaign with a home fixture against Crewe Alexandra.

=== August ===
6 August 2011 01 L2	Swindon Town	3–0	Crewe Alexandra	County Ground
15:00	Kennedy 45' (pen.); Risser 63'; Flint 77'	Report		Attendance: 8,248; Referee: Michael Naylor (South Yorkshire)

13 August 2011 02 L2	Cheltenham Town	1–0	Swindon Town	Abbey Business Stadium
15:00	Elliott 48'	Report		Attendance: 4,402; Referee: Craig Pawson (South Yorkshire)

16 August 2011 03 L2	Dagenham & Redbridge	1–0	Swindon Town	Victoria Road
19:45	Arber 70' (pen.)	Report		Attendance: 2,063; Referee: Carl Berry (Surrey)

21 August 2011 04 L2	Swindon Town	1–2	Oxford United	County Ground
13:00	Ritchie 20'	Report	Constable 12', 43'	Attendance: 12,113; Referee: Mark Haywood (West Yorkshire)

27 August 2011 05 L2	Shrewsbury Town	2–1	Swindon Town	New Meadow
15:00	Gornell 57'; Morgan 71'	Report	Ritchie 25'	Attendance: 5,323; Referee: Mark Heywood

=== September ===
3 September 2011 06 L2	Swindon Town	3–2	Rotherham United	County Ground
12:15	Ritchie 39'; Connell 68' 81'; Comazzi (red card) 85'	Report	Revell 21', 65'	Attendance: 6,304; Referee: Carl Boyeson (East Yorkshire)

10 September 2011 07 L2	Swindon Town	2–0	Southend United	County Ground
15:00	J. Smith 38'; Kerrouche 48'	Report		Attendance: 6,862; Referee: Dean Mohareb (Lancashire)

13 September 2011 08 L2	Crawley Town	0–3	Swindon Town	Broadfield Stadium
19:45		Report	Connell 28'; Kerrouche 82' 85'	Attendance: 2,790; Referee: J. Linington (Newport, Isle of Wight)

17 September 2011 09 L2	Burton Albion	2–0	Swindon Town	Pirelli Stadium
15:00	Kee 21'; Maghoma 47'	Report		Attendance: 3,320; Referee: R. Lewis (Shropshire)

24 September 2011 10 L2	Swindon Town	4–0	Barnet	County Ground
15:00	De Vita 11'; Ritchie 23' 65'; Kerrouche 45+1'	Report		Attendance: 7,279; Referee: Phil Gibbs (West Midlands)

30 September 2011 11 L2	Macclesfield Town	2–0	Swindon Town	Moss Rose
19:45	Donnelly 62'; Draper 83'	Report		Attendance: 2,317; Referee: Steve Rushton (Staffordshire)

=== October ===
8 October 2011 12 L2	Swindon Town	3–3	Hereford United	County Ground
15:00	De Vita 7'; Kerrouche 40'; Ferry 79'	Report	Barkhuizen 67'; Arquin 76'; Pell 90'	Attendance: 7,456; Referee: J. Waugh (Yorkshire)

15 October 2011 13 L2	Accrington Stanley	0–2	Swindon Town	Crown Ground
15:00		Report	Jervis 39'; Montano 58'	Attendance: 1,663; Referee: Andy Haines (Tyne & Wear)

22 October 2011 14 L2	Plymouth Argyle	0–1	Swindon Town	Home Park
15:00		Report	De Vita 82'	Attendance: 6,872; Referee: K.A. Woolmer (Northamptonshire)

26 October 2011 15 L2	Swindon Town	2–0	Gillingham	County Ground
19:45	Ritchie 80'; Smith 90+1'	Report		Attendance: 7,787; Referee: David Coote (Nottingham)

29 October 2011 16 L2	Swindon Town	0–0	Bradford City	County Ground
15:00		Report		Attendance: 7,701; Referee: Oliver Langford (West Midlands)

=== November ===
5 November 2011 17 L2	Port Vale	0–2	Swindon Town	Vale Park
15:00		Report	Magera 25'; Kerrouche 49' (pen.)	Attendance: 4,961; Referee: Darren Sheldrake (Surrey)

19 November 2011 18 L2	AFC Wimbledon	1–1	Swindon Town	Kingsmeadow
15:00	Hatton 6'	Report	Connell 73'	Attendance: 4,581; Referee: Iain Williamson (Berkshire)

26 November 2011 19 L2	Swindon Town	2–0	Aldershot Town	County Ground
15:00	Jervis 52'; Jones 71' (o.g.)	[Report]		Referee: J. Adcock (Nottinghamshire)

=== December ===
10 December 2011 20 L2	Bristol Rovers	1–1	Swindon Town	Memorial Stadium
15:00	Woodards 88'	Report	Caddis 37'	Attendance: 7,726; Referee: Darren Drysdale (Lincolnshire)

17 December 2011 21 L2	Swindon Town	3–0	Morecambe	County Ground
15:00	Jervis 27'; De Vita 45'; Murray 76'	Report		Attendance: 7,116; Referee: Steve Rushton (Staffordshire)

26 December 2011 22 L2	Torquay United	1–0	Swindon Town	Plainmoor
15:00	Atieno 34'	Report		Attendance: 4,157; Referee: Steve Tanner (Somerset)

31 December 2011 23 L2	Northampton Town	1–2	Swindon Town	Sixfields
15:00	Jacobs 22' (pen.)	Report	Connell 67'; McCormack 90+3'	Attendance: 5,808; Referee: Mike Jones (Cheshire)

=== January ===
2 January 2012 24 L2	Swindon Town	2–0	AFC Wimbledon	County Ground
15:00	Caddis 58'; Connell 76'	Report		Attendance: 8,374; Referee: D. Phillips (West Sussex)

14 January 2012 25 L2	Rotherham United	1–2	Swindon Town	Don Valley Stadium
15:00	Revell 54'	Report	Ritchie 19' 20'	Attendance: 4,236; Referee: Andy D'Urso (Essex)

21 January 2012 26 L2	Swindon Town	1–0	Macclesfield Town	County Ground
15:00	Benson 76'	Report		Attendance: 7,639; Referee: Keith Stroud (Dorset)

31 January 2012 27 L2	Southend United	1–4	Swindon Town	Roots Hall
19:45	Kalala 34'	Report	Ritchie 9'; J. Smith 16'; Devera 37'; Bodin 55'	Attendance: 5,958; Referee: Oliver Langford (West Midlands)

=== February ===
14 February 2012 28 L2	Swindon Town	3–0	Crawley Town	County Ground
19:45	Rooney 39'; Bodin 53'; Benson 68'	Report		Attendance: 8,311; Referee: Mark Hayward (West Yorkshire)

18 February 2012 29 L2	Hereford United	1–2	Swindon Town	Edgar Street
15:00	Purdie 65'	Report	Caddis 39' (pen.); Benson 62'	Attendance: 3,068; Referee: Gary Sutton (Lincolnshire)

21 February 2012 30 L2	Swindon Town	2–1	Shrewsbury Town	County Ground
19:45	Connell 64' 76'	Report	Richards 40'	Attendance: 7,990; Referee: Brendan Malone (Wiltshire)

25 February 2012 31 L2	Swindon Town	2–0	Accrington Stanley	County Ground
15:00	Benson 8' 29'	Report		Attendance: 7,962; Referee: Chris Sarginson (Staffordshire)

28 February 2012 32 L2	Swindon Town	2–0	Burton Albion	County Ground
19:45	Murray 53'; Benson 58'	Report		Attendance: 7,261; Referee: Fred Graham (Essex)

=== March ===
2 March 2012 33 L2	Oxford United	2–0	Swindon Town	Kassam Stadium
12:00	Hall 16'; Johnson 18'	Report		Attendance: 11,825; Referee: Graham Salisbury (Lancashire)

6 March 2012 34 L2	Swindon Town	4–0	Dagenham & Redbridge	County Ground
19:45	Bodin 22'; Devera 59'; Rooney 63'; Benson 75'	Report		Attendance: 6,839; Referee: David Coote (Northamptonshire)

10 March 2012 35 L2	Swindon Town	1–0	Cheltenham Town	County Ground
15:00	Benson 35'	Summary		Attendance: 10,659; Referee: Mick Russell

17 March 2012 36 L2	Crewe Alexandra	2–0	Swindon Town	Alexandra Stadium
15:00	Powell 29'; Westwood 65'	Summary		Attendance: 4,641; Referee: Darren Deadman

20 March 2012 37 L2	Swindon Town	2–0	Torquay United	County Ground
19:45	Connell 33'; Risser 58'	Summary		Attendance: 8,351; Referee: Lee Collins

31 March 2012 38 L2	Swindon Town	0–0	Bristol Rovers	County Ground
15:00		Report		Attendance: 9,645; Referee: Kevin Friend

=== April ===
3 April 2012 39 L2	Barnet	0–2	Swindon Town	Underhill
19:45		Report	Murray 13'; Risser 31'	Attendance: 2,211; Referee: James Adcock (Nottinghamshire)

6 April 2012 40 L2	Morecambe	0–1	Swindon Town	Globe Arena
15:00		Report	Benson 46'	Attendance: 3,011; Referee: Fred Graham (Essex)

9 April 2012 41 L2	Swindon Town	1–0	Northampton Town	County Ground
15:00	Holmes 52'	Report		Attendance: 8,745; Referee: Stuart Attwell (Warwickshire)

14 April 2012 42 L2	Swindon Town	1–0	Plymouth Argyle	County Ground
15:00	Connell 52'	Report		Attendance: 10,422; Referee: Scott Mathieson (Cheshire)

17 April 2012 43 L2	Aldershot Town	2–1	Swindon Town	Recreation Ground
19:45	Madjo 12'; Hylton 58'	Report	Caddis 52' (pen.)	Attendance: 3,526; Referee: M. Heywood

21 April 2012 44 L2	Gillingham	3–1	Swindon Town	Priestfield Stadium
15:00	Kedwell 26'; Whelpdale 52' 90' (pen.)	Report	McCormack 81'	Attendance: 6,390; Referee: S. Rushton

28 April 2012 45 L2	Swindon Town	5–0	Port Vale	County Ground
15:00	Ritchie 38'; Benson 51' 65'; Flint 67'; Connell 85'	Report		Attendance: 12,864; Referee: D. Phillips

=== May ===
5 May 2012 46 L2	Bradford City	0–0	Swindon Town	Valley Parade
15:00		Report		Attendance: 11,576; Referee: Graham Salisbury (Lancashire)

=== League Cup ===
Swindon's Carling Cup round 1 tie against Bristol City drawn to be played on 9 August 2011 was postponed on police advice. This was due to fears of safety issues following the riots throughout England, including Bristol.

24 August 2011 Round 1	Bristol City	0–1	Swindon Town	Ashton Gate
19:45		Report	De Vita 71'	Attendance: 7,708; Referee: Gavin Ward

30 August 2011 Round 2	Swindon Town	1–3	Southampton	County Ground
19:45	Kerrouche 84'	Report	Guly 17'; Forte 30'; Lambert 90'	Attendance: 7,452; Referee: Fred Graham

=== Football League Trophy ===
Round 1	BYE

4 October 2011 Round 2	Exeter City	1–2	Swindon Town	St James Park
1915	Nardiello 72'	Report	Jervis 18' 35'	Attendance: 2,627; Referee: Darren Deadman (Cambridgeshire)

8 November 2011 Area Q-F	Swindon Town	1–1 (3–1 p)	AFC Wimbledon	County Ground
19:30	Risser 68'	Report	Yussuff 82'	Attendance: 4,329; Referee: Andy D'Urso (Billericay, Essex)
	Penalties
	Connell (penalty scored); Risser (penalty scored); Esajas (penalty scored)		(penalty missed) Minshull; (penalty missed) Wellard; (penalty scored) Franks; (penalty missed) Bush

6 December 2011 Area S-F	Southend United	1–2	Swindon Town	Roots Hall
19:45	Sturrock 62'	Report	Caddis 68'; Murray 81'	Attendance: 3,981; Referee: Darren Sheldrake (Surrey)

10 January 2012 Area Final L1	Barnet	1–1	Swindon Town	Underhill Stadium
19:45	Hughes 72'	[Report]	Flint 44'	Attendance: 3,915; Referee: N. Miller (County Durham)

12 January 2012 Area Final L2	Swindon Town	1–0	Barnet	County Ground, Swindon
19:45	Connell 17'	Report		Attendance: 10,406; Referee: Darren Deadman (Cambridgeshire)

25 March 2012 Final	Chesterfield	2–0	Swindon Town	Wembley Stadium
14:00	Risser 47' (o.g.); Westcarr 90+4'	Summary		Attendance: 49,602; Referee: Tony Bates

=== F.A. Cup ===
As a member of League Two, Swindon Town will enter the FA Cup at the First Round stage.

12 November 2011 Round 1	Swindon Town	4–1	Huddersfield Town	County Ground
15:00	Flint 36'; De Vita 39'; Kerrouche 76'; Ferry 87'	(Report)	Novak 22'	Attendance: 5,728; Referee: Phil Gibbs (West Midlands)

3 December 2011 Round 2	Colchester United	0–1	Swindon Town	Colchester Community Stadium
15:00		Report	Ritchie 59'	Attendance: 3,035; Referee: Michael Naylor (West Yorkshire)

7 January 2012 Round 3	Swindon Town	2–1	Wigan Athletic	County Ground
15:00	Connell 40'; Benson 76'	Report	McManaman 35'	Attendance: 13,238; Referee: Peter Walton (Northamptonshire)

28 January 2012 Round 4	Leicester City	2–0	Swindon Town	King Power Stadium
15:00	Beckford 5' 53'	Report		Attendance: 19,942; Referee: Darren Drysdale (Lincolnshire)

== Squad information ==
=== Club officials ===
Position	Name
Chairman	(England) Jeremy Wray (interim)
Directors	(England) Jeremy Wray, Russell Backhouse, Andrew Black, Nick Watkins
Chief Executive	(England) Nick Watkins
Manager	(Italy) Paolo Di Canio
Assistant manager	(Italy) Fabrizio Piccareta
Goalkeeper coach	(Italy) Domenico Doardo
Fitness coach	(Italy) Claudio Donatelli
Youth Team Manager	(Wales) Paul Bodin
Centre of Excellence	(England) Jeremy Newton
Physio	(England) Paul Godfrey

== Management record ==
As of 6 May 2012. Only competitive matches are counted

Name	Nat	Record					
Name	Nat	P	W	D	L	F	A
Paolo Di Canio	(Italy)	58	36	8	14	91	45

== Captains ==
Accounts for all competitions. Last updated on 6 May 2012.

No.	Pos.	Name	Games
13	DF/MF	(Namibia) Oliver Risser	3
6	DF	(Scotland) Paul Caddis	47
12	DF/MF	(Republic of Ireland) Alan McCormack	8

== Squad statistics ==
=== Appearances and goals ===
As of 6 May 2012

No.	Pos	Nat	Player	Total		League Two		FA Cup		League Cup		JP Trophy	
No.	Pos	Nat	Player	Apps	Goals	Apps	Goals	Apps	Goals	Apps	Goals	Apps	Goals
1	GK	(Italy) ITA	Mattia Lanzano	7	0	5+1	0	0+0	0	0+0	0	1+0	0
2	DF	(England) ENG	Jay McEveley (on loan from Barnsley)	9	0	8+0	0	0+0	0	0+0	0	1+0	0
3	DF	(England) ENG	Callum Kennedy	23	1	18+0	1	2+0	0	2+0	0	1+0	0
4	DF	(England) ENG	Aden Flint	40	4	28+4	2	3+0	1	2+0	0	3+0	1
5	DF	(England) ENG	Joe Devera	35	2	28+0	2	1+0	0	1+0	0	4+1	0
7	DF	(Scotland) SCO	Paul Caddis	50	4	39+0	3	4+0	0	2+0	0	5+0	1
8	MF	(Scotland) SCO	Simon Ferry	53	2	36+8	1	3+0	1	1+0	0	4+1	0
9	FW	(England) ENG	Paul Benson	25	12	20+2	11	1+1	1	0+0	0	1+0	0
10	MF	(England) ENG	Matt Ritchie	52	11	40+0	10	4+0	1	2+0	0	6+0	0
11	MF	(Netherlands) NED	Etiënne Esajas	9	0	2+4	0	0+1	0	0+1	0	0+1	0
12	MF	(Ireland) EIR	Alan McCormack	50	2	38+2	2	4+0	0	0+2	0	4+0	0
13	MF	(Namibia) NAM	Oliver Risser	40	4	23+9	3	3+0	0	0+0	0	3+2	1
14	MF	(England) ENG	John Bostock (on loan from Tottenham Hotspur)	4	0	3+0	0	0+0	0	0+0	0	0+1	0
15	DF	(England) ENG	Nathan Thompson	6	0	2+3	0	0+0	0	0+0	0	0+1	0
16	MF	(England) ENG	Lee Cox	7	0	2+5	0	0+0	0	0+0	0	0+0	0
17	FW	(England) ENG	Alan Connell	44	12	13+19	11	3+1	1	2+0	0	5+1	0
18	GK	(England) ENG	Mark Scott	0	0	0+0	0	0+0	0	0+0	0	0+0	0
19	MF	(England) ENG	Luke Rooney	20	2	13+7	2	0+0	0	0+0	0	0+0	0
20	MF	(Somalia) SOM	Abdul Said	0	0	0+0	0	0+0	0	0+0	0	0+0	0
21	MF	(Spain) ESP	Lander Gabilondo	18	0	4+6	0	1+1	0	2+0	0	3+1	0
22	MF	(England) ENG	Lee Holmes (on loan from Southampton)	11	1	7+3	1	0+0	0	0+0	0	1+0	0
23	FW	(Italy) ITA	Raffaele De Vita	46	6	30+8	4	4+0	1	0+1	1	2+1	0
24	MF	(England) ENG	Jonathan Smith	48	3	28+10	3	2+1	0	2+0	0	5+0	0
25	FW	(France) FRA	Jonathan Téhoué (on loan from Leyton Orient)	3	0	1+2	0	0+0	0	0+0	0	0+0	0
26	GK	(England) ENG	Phil Smith	11	0	8+0	0	0+0	0	2+0	0	1+0	0
27	DF	(Italy) ITA	Alessandro Cibocchi	26	0	11+7	0	1+2	0	0+0	0	3+2	0
28	FW	(England) ENG	Miles Storey	4	0	0+4	0	0+0	0	0+0	0	0+0	0
29	FW	(Czech Republic) CZE	Lukáš Magera	17	1	5+6	1	1+1	0	0+1	0	1+2	0
30	GK	(England) ENG	Leigh Bedwell	0	0	0+0	0	0+0	0	0+0	0	0+0	0
31	FW	(Wales) WAL	Billy Bodin	11	3	9+2	3	0+0	0	0+0	0	0+0	0
32	DF	(England) ENG	Chris Smith	1	0	0+1	0	0+0	0	0+0	0	0+0	0
34	FW	(Ireland) EIR	Ronan Murray (on loan from Ipswich Town)	26	4	9+11	3	1+2	0	0+0	0	1+2	1
35	GK	(England) ENG	Wes Foderingham	41	0	33+0	0	4+0	0	0+0	0	4+0	0
37	MF	(England) ENG	Louis Thompson	1	0	0+0	0	0+1	0	0+0	0	0+0	0
39	FW	(Algeria) ALG	Mehdi Kerrouche	18	8	9+4	6	1+1	1	0+1	1	1+1	0
LOAN PLAYERS WHO HAVE SINCE LEFT SWINDON (Statistics shown are the appearances made and goals scored while at Swindon Town)
6	DF	(England) ENG	Daniel Boateng (on loan from Arsenal)	2	0	2+0	0	0+0	0	0+0	0	0+0	0
32	MF	(Saudi Arabia) KSA	Ahmed Abdulla (on loan from West Ham United)	7	0	1+5	0	0+0	0	0+0	0	1+0	0
33	FW	(England) ENG	Jake Jervis (on loan from Birmingham City)	14	5	10+2	3	0+0	0	0+0	0	2+0	2
34	FW	(Colombia) COL	Cristian Montano (on loan from West Ham United)	4	1	3+1	1	0+0	0	0+0	0	0+0	0
36	DF	(England) ENG	Liam Ridehalgh (on loan from Huddersfield Town)	13	0	9+2	0	1+0	0	0+0	0	1+0	0
Players who left the club on a permanent basis during the season:
2	DF	(England) ENG	Kevin Amankwaah (Released)	0	0	0+0	0	0+0	0	0+0	0	0+0	0
6	DF	(Italy) ITA	Alberto Comazzi (Released)	5	0	4+0	0	0+0	0	1+0	0	0+0	0
9	FW	(England) ENG	Leon Clarke (Part Exchange)	4	0	2+0	0	0+0	0	2+0	0	0+0	0
14	FW	(England) ENG	Jordan Pavett (Released)	0	0	0+0	0	0+0	0	0+0	0	0+0	0
16	MF	(Ghana) GHA	Ibrahim Atiku (Released)	0	0	0+0	0	0+0	0	0+0	0	0+0	0
19	MF	(England) ENG	Matt Clark (Released)	0	0	0+0	0	0+0	0	0+0	0	0+0	0
22	MF	(Ireland) EIR	Michael Timlin (Sold)	1	0	1+0	0	0+0	0	0+0	0	0+0	0
25	DF	(England) ENG	Will Evans (Released)	0	0	0+0	0	0+0	0	0+0	0	0+0	0
--	FW	(England) ENG	Elliot Benyon (Sold)	0	0	0+0	0	0+0	0	0+0	0	0+0	0

=== Goalscorers ===
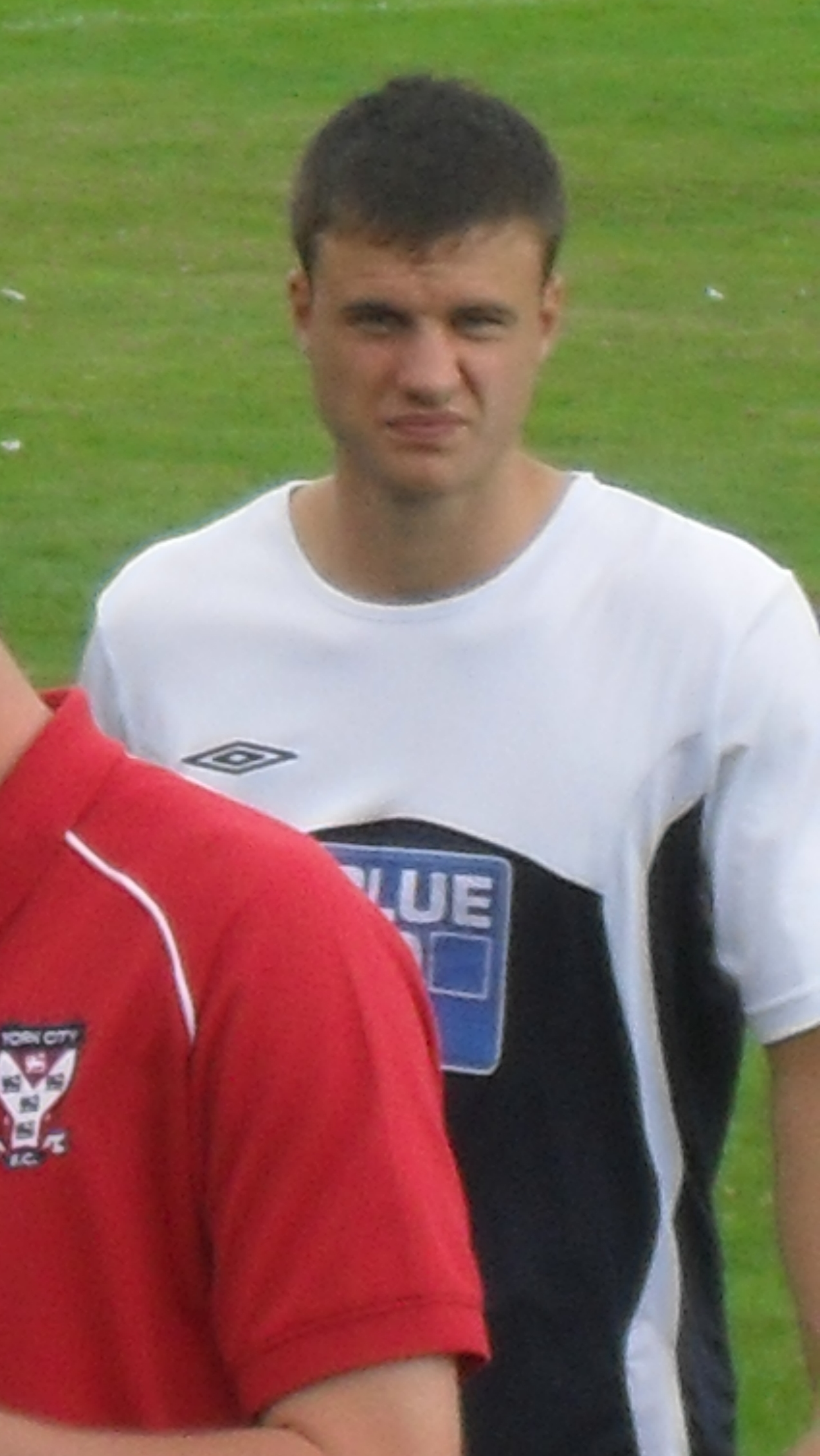
Jonathan Smith scored his first goal for Swindon in the 2–0 home win against Southend United in September 2011.

Name	League	FA Cup	League Cup	JP Trophy	Total
Alan Connell	11	1	0	1	13
Paul Benson	11	1	0	0	12
Matt Ritchie	10	1	0	0	11
Mehdi Kerrouche	6	1	1	0	8
Raffaele De Vita	4	1	1	0	6
Paul Caddis	4	0	0	1	5
Jake Jervis	3	0	0	2	5
Ronan Murray	3	0	0	1	4
Oliver Risser	3	0	0	1	4
Billy Bodin	3	0	0	0	3
Aden Flint	1	1	0	1	3
Jonathan Smith	3	0	0	0	3
Joe Devera	2	0	0	0	2
Simon Ferry	1	1	0	0	2
Alan McCormack	2	0	0	0	2
Luke Rooney	2	0	0	0	2
Lee Holmes	1	0	0	0	1
Callum Kennedy	1	0	0	0	1
Lukáš Magera	1	0	0	0	1
Cristian Montano	1	0	0	0	1
OWN GOALS	1	0	0	0	1
Total	74	7	2	7	91

=== Penalties awarded ===
Includes all competitive matches.

R	No.	Pos	Nat	Name	Competition	Opposition	Success	Technique	Notes
1	3	DF	(England)	Callum Kennedy	League Two	vs. Crewe Alexandra (6 August 2011)	✓	Bottom left corner	
2	39	FW	(Algeria)	Mehdi Kerrouche	League Two	vs. Port Vale (5 November 2011)	✓	Top left corner	
3	17	FW	(England)	Alan Connell	Football League Trophy	vs. AFC Wimbledon (8 November 2011)	✓	Top left corner	Penalty Shoot-Out
4	13	MF	(Namibia)	Oliver Risser	Football League Trophy	vs. AFC Wimbledon (8 November 2011)	✓	Top left corner	Penalty Shoot-Out
5	11	MF	(Netherlands)	Etiënne Esajas	Football League Trophy	vs. AFC Wimbledon (8 November 2011)	✓	Middle right	Penalty Shoot-Out
6	10	MF	(England)	Matt Ritchie	League Two	vs. Macclesfield Town (21 January 2012)	✗	Missed target	
7	2	DF	(Scotland)	Paul Caddis	League Two	vs. Hereford United (18 February 2012)	✓		
8	2	DF	(Scotland)	Paul Caddis	League Two	vs. Aldershot Town (17 April 2012)	✓		

Last updated: 23 November 2011
Source: Match reports in Competitive matches

=== Disciplinary record ===
Name	League Two		FA Cup		League Cup		JP Trophy		Total	
Name	Yellow card	Red card	Yellow card	Red card	Yellow card	Red card	Yellow card	Red card	Yellow card	Red card
Ahmed Abdulla	1	0	0	0	0	0	1	0	2	0
Paul Benson	5	0	0	0	0	0	0	0	5	0
Paul Caddis	5	0	0	0	1	0	0	0	6	0
Alessandro Cibocchi	1	0	1	0	0	0	0	0	2	0
Alberto Comazzi	4	1	0	0	0	0	0	0	4	1
Alan Connell	1	0	0	0	0	0	1	0	2	0
Raffaele De Vita	3	0	0	0	0	0	0	0	3	0
Joe Devera	1	0	0	0	0	0	0	0	1	0
Etiënne Esajas	2	0	0	0	0	0	0	0	2	0
Simon Ferry	3	0	0	0	0	0	0	0	3	0
Aden Flint	6	0	0	0	0	0	1	0	7	0
Wes Foderingham	2	0	0	0	0	0	0	0	2	0
Jake Jervis	1	0	0	0	0	0	0	0	1	0
Callum Kennedy	0	0	0	0	0	0	1	0	1	0
Mehdi Kerrouche	3	0	0	0	1	0	0	0	4	0
Mattia Lanzano	2	0	0	0	0	0	0	0	2	0
Lukáš Magera	1	0	0	0	0	0	1	0	2	0
Alan McCormack	10	0	1	0	1	0	1	0	13	0
Jay McEveley	2	0	0	0	0	0	0	0	2	0
Liam Ridehalgh	1	0	0	0	0	0	0	0	1	0
Oliver Risser	1	1	0	0	0	0	1	0	2	1
Matt Ritchie	5	0	0	0	0	0	1	0	6	0
Luke Rooney	1	0	0	0	0	0	0	0	1	0
Jonathan Smith	4	0	1	0	0	0	0	0	5	0
Nathan Thompson	1	0	0	0	0	0	0	0	1	0
Total	66	2	3	0	3	0	8	0	81	2

=== Suspensions served ===
Date	Matches Missed	Suspended Player	Reason	Missed Opponents
3 September 2011	1	(Italy) Alberto Comazzi	(yellow card) (red card) vs. Rotherham United	Southend United (H)
17 September 2011	1	(Republic of Ireland) Alan McCormack	(yellow card) 5th Booking vs. Burton Albion	Barnet (H)
7 December 2011	1	(England) Matt Ritchie	(yellow card) 5th Booking vs. Southend United	Bristol Rovers (A)
31 December 2011	3	(Namibia) Oliver Risser	(red card) vs. Northampton Town	AFC Wimbledon (H), Wigan Athletic (H), Barnet (A)
10 January 2012	2	(Republic of Ireland) Alan McCormack	(yellow card) 10th Booking vs. Barnet	Rotherham United (A), Macclesfield Town (H)

== Transfers ==
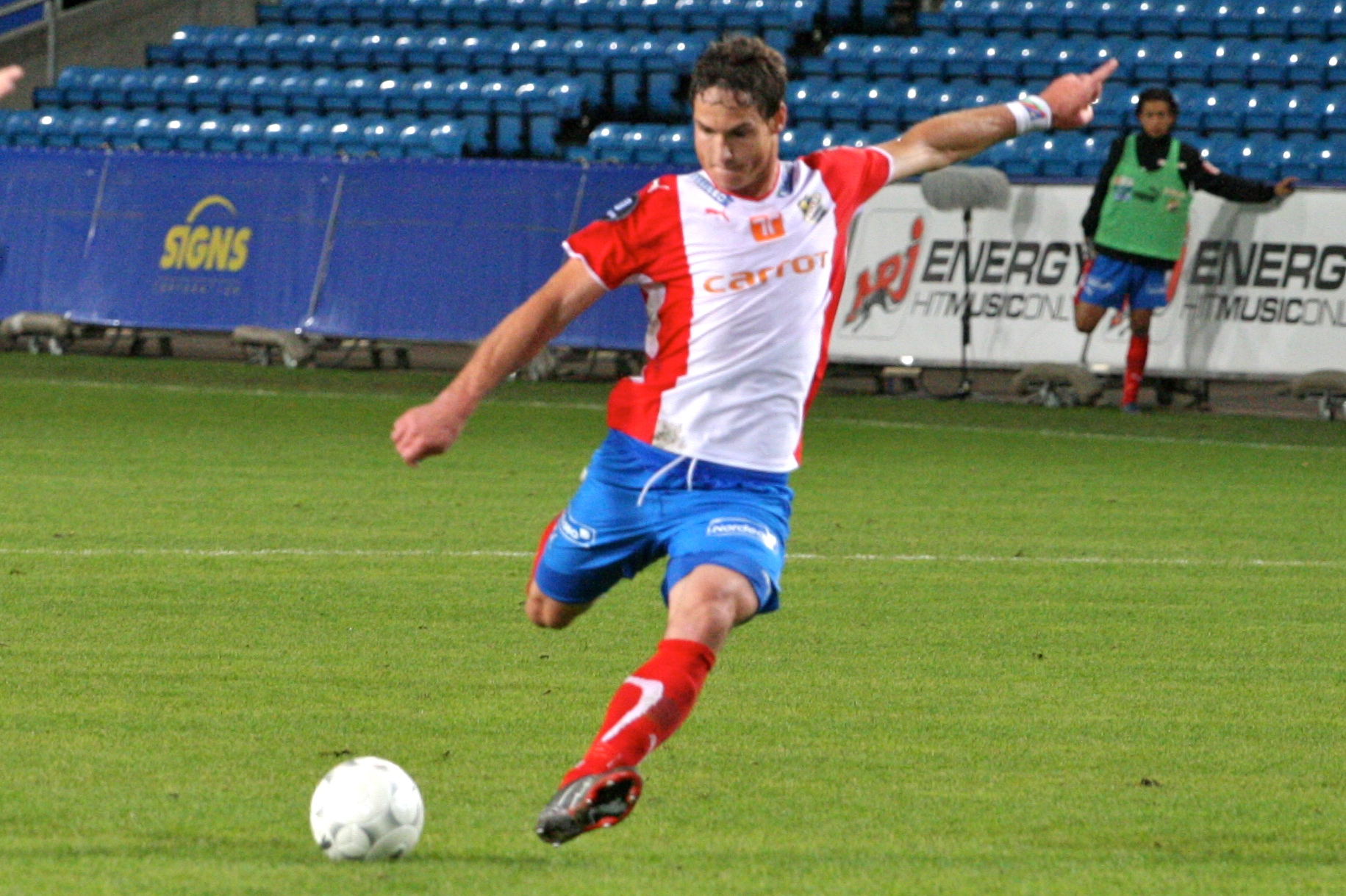
Oliver Risser initially joined Swindon as a trialist before signing a two-year contract shortly afterwards. The Namibia international scored on his full debut against Crewe Alexandra in August 2011.

Players transferred in
No.	Date	Pos.	Name	From	Fee	Ref.
1	17 June 2011	DF	(England) Joe Devera	(England) Barnet	Free	
2	21 June 2011	MF	(England) Jonathan Smith	(England) York City	£30,000	
3	23 June 2011	FW	(Italy) Raffaele De Vita	(Scotland) Livingston	Free	
4	28 June 2011	DF	(Italy) Alberto Comazzi	(Italy) Spezia	Free	
5	4 July 2011	GK	(Italy) Mattia Lanzano	(Italy) US Gavorrano	Free	
6	10 July 2011	MF	(Namibia) Oliver Risser	(Finland) KuPS	Free	
7	10 July 2011	MF	(Ghana) Ibrahim Atiku	(Greece) Ethnikos Piraeus	Free	
8	18 July 2011	FW	(England) Alan Connell	(England) Grimsby Town	Undisclosed	
9	18 July 2011	FW	(Algeria) Mehdi Kerrouche	(United Arab Emirates) Al-Oruba	Free	
10	19 July 2011	DF	(Italy) Alessandro Cibocchi	(Italy) PortoSummaga	Free	
11	25 July 2011	MF	(Republic of Ireland) Alan McCormack	(England) Charlton Athletic	Free	
12	26 July 2011	MF	(Netherlands) Etiënne Esajas	(Netherlands) Helmond Sport	Free	
13	19 August 2011	FW	(England) Leon Clarke	(England) Queens Park Rangers	Free	
14	19 August 2011	MF	(Spain) Lander Gabilondo	(Spain) CA Osasuna B	Free	
15	22 August 2011	FW	(Czech Republic) Lukáš Magera	(Romania) Politehnica Timișoara	Undisclosed	
16	1 January 2012	FW	(England) Paul Benson	(England) Charlton Athletic	Part Exchange	
17	6 January 2012	GK	(England) Wes Foderingham	(England) Crystal Palace	Undisclosed	
18	17 January 2012	MF	(England) Luke Rooney	(England) Gillingham	Undisclosed	
19	31 January 2012	MF	(England) Lee Cox	(Scotland) Inverness Caledonian Thistle	Undisclosed	
20	20 February 2012	DF	(England) Chris Smith	(England) Stone Dominoes	Free	
Players transferred out
No.	Date	Pos.	Name	To	Fee	Ref.
1	17 May 2011	DF	(England) Michael Rose	(England) Colchester United	Free	
2	24 May 2011	MF	(England) David Prutton	(England) Sheffield Wednesday	Free	
3	31 May 2011	FW	(France) Vincent Pericard	(England) Havant & Waterlooville	Released	
4	31 May 2011	GK	(Poland) Jakub Jesionkowski	(European Union) Released	Free	
5	3 June 2011	DF	(Scotland) Scott Cuthbert	(England) Leyton Orient	Free	
6	3 June 2011	DF	(Republic of Ireland) Alan Sheehan	(England) Notts County	Free	
7	20 June 2011	MF	(Scotland) Jon-Paul McGovern	(England) Carlisle United	Free	
8	20 June 2011	DF	(Haiti) Lescinel Jean-Francois	(England) Sheffield United	Free	
9	30 June 2011	MF	(Republic of Ireland) Jonathan Douglas	(England) Brentford	Free	
10	31 August 2011	MF	(England) Kevin Amankwaah	(England) Burton Albion	Released	
11	28 October 2011	MF	(Ghana) Ibrahim Atiku	(European Union) Released	Released	
12	1 January 2012	MF	(England) Matt Clark	(European Union) Released	Released	
13	1 January 2012	FW	(England) Leon Clarke	(England) Charlton Athletic	Part Exchange	
14	1 January 2012	DF	(England) Will Evans	(England) Hereford United	Undisclosed	
15	1 January 2012	FW	(England) Elliot Benyon	(England) Southend United	Undisclosed	
16	5 January 2012	MF	(Republic of Ireland) Michael Timlin	(England) Southend United	Undisclosed	
17	19 January 2012	MF	(Italy) Alberto Comazzi	(European Union) Released	Released	
18	19 January 2012	FW	(England) Jordan Pavett	(England) Bishop's Stortford	Released	
Players loaned in
No.	Date from	Pos.	Name	From	Date to	Ref.
1	30 August 2011	MF	(Saudi Arabia) Ahmed Abdulla	(England) West Ham United	6 December 2011	
2	28 September 2011	DF	(England) Liam Ridehalgh	(England) Huddersfield Town	28 December 2011	
3	29 September 2011	FW	(England) Jake Jervis	(England) Birmingham City	30 December 2011	
4	13 October 2011	FW	(Colombia) Cristian Montano	(England) West Ham United	8 November 2011	
5	14 October 2011	FW	(England) Wes Foderingham	(England) Crystal Palace	6 January 2012	
6	24 November 2011	FW	(Republic of Ireland) Ronan Murray	(England) Ipswich Town	14 January 2012	
7	19 January 2012	FW	(Republic of Ireland) Ronan Murray	(England) Ipswich Town	End of the Season	
8	20 January 2012	DF	(England) Daniel Boateng	(England) Arsenal	6 March 2012	
9	7 March 2012	FW	(France) Jonathan Téhoué	(England) Leyton Orient	End of the Season	
10	14 March 2012	MF	(England) Lee Holmes	(England) Southampton	End of the Season	
11	22 March 2012	MF	(England) John Bostock	(England) Tottenham Hotspur	End of the Season	
11	22 March 2012	DF	(Scotland) Jay McEveley	(England) Barnsley	End of the Season	
	Players loaned out					
No.	Date from	Pos.	Name	To	Date to	Ref.
1	20 June 2011	FW	(England) Elliot Benyon	(England) Wycombe Wanderers	31 May 2012	
2	25 August 2011	FW	(Wales) Billy Bodin	(England) Torquay United	4 January 2012	
3	25 August 2011	DF	(England) Will Evans	(England) Hereford United	1 January 2012	
4	31 August 2011	MF	(Republic of Ireland) Michael Timlin	(England) Southend United	5 January 2012	
5	8 September 2011	FW	(England) Leon Clarke	(England) Chesterfield	1 January 2012	
6	22 September 2011	MF	(England) Matt Clark	(England) Oxford City	1 January 2012	
7	7 October 2011	GK	(England) Mark Scott	(England) Oxford City	4 November 2011	
8	24 November 2011	MF	(Somalia) Abdul Said	(England) Fairford Town	28 December 2011	
9	25 November 2011	GK	(England) Mark Scott	(England) Salisbury City	20 February 2012	
10	24 December 2011	FW	(England) Jordan Pavett	(England) Heybridge Swifts	19 January 2012	
11	9 February 2012	FW	(Algeria) Mehdi Kerrouche	(England) Oxford United	10 March 2012	
12	20 February 2012	GK	(England) Mark Scott	(England) Salisbury City	4 April 2012	
13	21 February 2012	FW	(Czech Republic) Lukas Magera	(Czech Republic) Banik Ostrava	End of the Season	
14	22 March 2012	FW	(Wales) Billy Bodin	(England) Crewe Alexandra	End of the Season	

=== Trial players ===
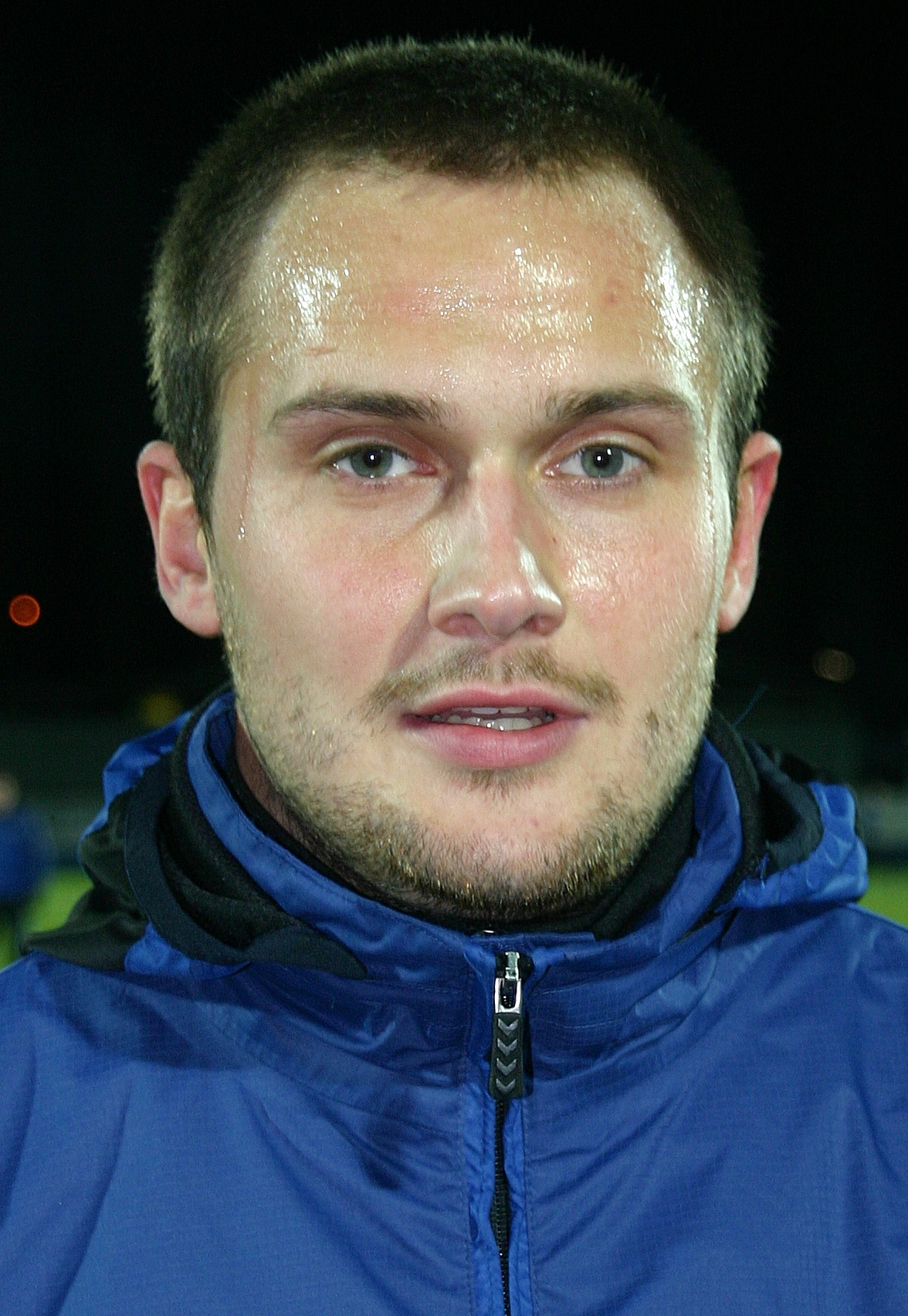
Michael Wojtanowicz trained with the club during the season.

Di Canio brought in several players on a trial basis during the early weeks as manager of Swindon. There was minor controversy when trialist Leon Knight was released from training after only two days for fitness related reasons. Knight would later direct angry messages on the social networking website Twitter towards his agent and the club for his early exit.

Nat.	Player	Notes	Ref
(England)	Leon Knight		
(Namibia)	Oliver Risser	Signed a permanent contract	
(Ghana)	Ibrahim Atiku	Signed a permanent contract	
(Estonia)	Taijo Teniste		
(Italy)	Cristian Cesaretti		
(Italy)	Alessandro Cibocchi	Signed a permanent contract	
(Italy)	Christian Paoletti		
(Netherlands)	Etiënne Esajas	Signed a permanent contract	
(Namibia)	Wilko Risser	Trained	

Nat.	Player	Notes	Ref
(Uruguay)	Nicolás Raimondi		
(Spain)	Lander Gabilondo	Signed a permanent contract	
(Austria)	Michael Wojtanowicz		
(England)	Rhys Evans	Trained	
(Wales)	Paul Mooney	Samsung Win A Pro Contract finalist	
(England)	Kane Louis	Samsung Win A Pro Contract finalist	
(England)	Tyron Amory	Samsung Win A Pro Contract finalist	
(England)	Chris Smith	Samsung Win A Pro Contract finalist	

== Monthly and weekly awards ==
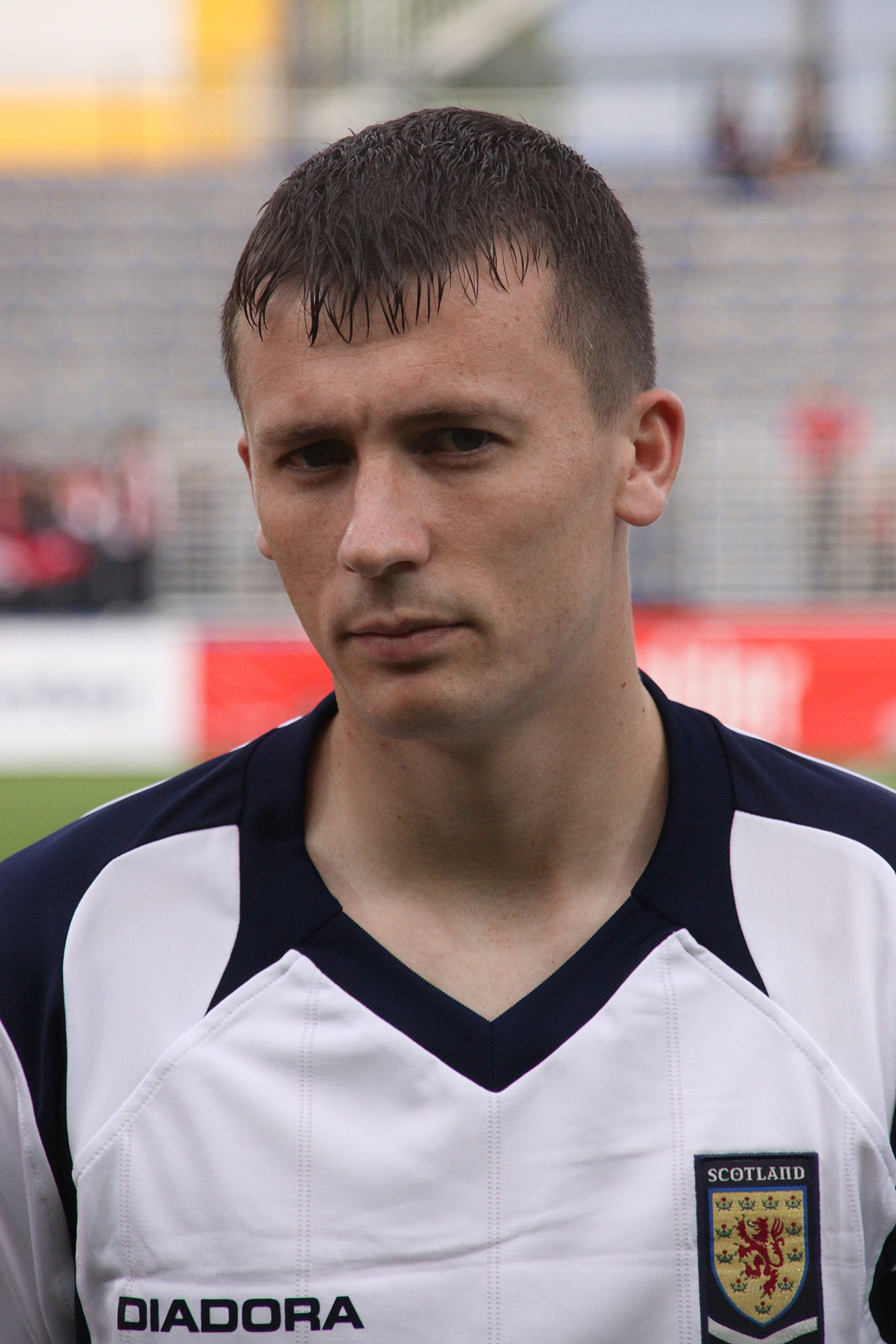
Paul Caddis captained the side to promotion and was included in the PFA League Two Team of the Year.

Award	Date	Player
League Two Team of the Week	8 August 2011	(England) Callum Kennedy
League Two Team of the Week	5 September 2011	(Scotland) Paul Caddis (England) Alan Connell
League Two Team of the Week	12 September 2011	(Italy) Mattia Lanzano
League Two Team of the Week	26 September 2011	(England) Matt Ritchie (England) Phil Smith
League Two Team of the Week	17 October 2011	(England) Aden Flint
League Two Team of the Week	24 October 2011	(Italy) Raffaele De Vita (England) Wes Foderingham
League Two Team of the Week	7 November 2011	(England) Liam Ridehalgh
League Two Team of the Week	27 November 2011	(Scotland) Paul Caddis
League Two Team of the Week	3 January 2012	(Scotland) Paul Caddis
Football League Trophy; Ultimate Finish Award	10 January 2012	(Scotland) Paul Caddis
League Two Team of the Week	16 January 2012	(England) Matt Ritchie
League Two Team of the Week	23 January 2012	(England) Aden Flint
League Two Team of the Week	18 February 2012	(England) Matt Ritchie
League Two Team of the Week	26 February 2012	(England) Paul Benson (Republic of Ireland) Alan McCormack
League Two Manager of the Month	February 2012	(Italy) Paolo Di Canio
League Two Player of the Month	February 2012	(England) Paul Benson
League Two Team of the Week	12 March 2012	(England) Wes Foderingham (Republic of Ireland) Alan McCormack
League Two Team of the Week	10 April 2012	(Republic of Ireland) Alan McCormack (Scotland) Jay McEveley
League Two Team of the Week	14 April 2012	(England) Aden Flint
PFA League Two Team of the Year	2011–12 Season	(Scotland) Paul Caddis (England) Matt Ritchie
Ronnie Radford Award	F.A. Cup performance vs. Wigan Athletic	(England) Wes Foderingham (England) Callum Kennedy (England) Aden Flint (Republic of Ireland) McCormack (Scotland) Paul Caddis (Italy) Raffaele De Vita (Scotland) Simon Ferry (England) Jonathan Smith (England) Matt Ritchie (England) Alan Connell (Republic of Ireland) Ronan Murray (England) Paul Benson (Czech Republic) Lukas Magera (Italy) Alessandro Cibocchi (Italy) Paolo Di Canio
League Two Medallists	28 April 2012	(England) Paul Benson (Scotland) Paul Caddis (Captain) (England) Alan Connell (England) Joe Devera (Italy) Raffaele De Vita (Scotland) Simon Ferry (England) Aden Flint (England) Wes Foderingham (Spain) Lander Gabilondo (England) Lee Holmes (England) Callum Kennedy (Republic of Ireland) Alan McCormack (Scotland) Jay McEveley (Republic of Ireland) Ronan Murray (Namibia) Oliver Risser (England) Luke Rooney (England) Jonathan Smith (England) Phil Smith (Italy) Paolo Di Canio
League Two Team of the Week	30 April 2012	(England) Aden Flint
Swindon Town Player of the Season	2011–12 Season	(Republic of Ireland) Alan McCormack
LMA League Two Manager of the Season	2011–12 Season	(Italy) Paolo Di Canio
BBC Team of the Year	2011–12 Season	(Scotland) Paul Caddis (England) Matt Ritchie
Football League Precision Goalkeeping Golden Glove	April 2012	(England) Wes Foderingham
League Two Precision Goalkeeping Golden Glove Award	2011–12 Season	(England) Wes Foderingham

== Summary ==
Games Played	58 (46 League Two, 4 FA Cup, 2 League Cup, 6 JP Trophy)
Games Won	36 (29 League Two, 3 FA Cup, 1 League Cup, 3 JP Trophy)
Games Drawn	8 (6 League Two, 0 FA Cup, 0 League Cup, 2 JP Trophy)
Games Lost	14 (11 League Two, 1 FA Cup, 1 League Cup, 1 JP Trophy)
Goals Scored	91 (75 League Two, 7 FA Cup, 2 League Cup, 7 JP Trophy)
Goals conceded	45 (32 League Two, 4 FA Cup, 3 League Cup, 6 JP Trophy)
Goal Difference	+46
Clean Sheets	29 (26 League Two, 1 FA Cup, 1 League Cup, 1 JP Trophy)
Yellow Cards	81 (66 League Two, 3 FA Cup, 3 League Cup, 8 JP Trophy)
Red Cards	2 (2 League Two, 0 FA Cup, 0 League Cup, 0 JP Trophy)
Worst Discipline	(Republic of Ireland) Alan McCormack, 13 yellows 0 reds
Best Result	5–0 vs. Barnet, 28 April 2012
Worst Result	1–3 vs. Southampton, 30 August 2011; 1–3 vs. Gillingham, 21 April 2012
Most Appearances	(Scotland) Simon Ferry (53 appearances)
Top Scorer	(England) Alan Connell (13 goals)
Points	93

=== Reserves ===
In June 2011 it was announced that Swindon Town would not compete in a Reserve League for the 2011–12 season and would therefore arrange friendlies with other clubs.

23 August 2011 Training	Portsmouth XI	4–0	Swindon Town XI
	Benjani 20' 41' 44'; Futács 45+1'	Report

6 September 2011 Training	Newport County XI	2–0	Swindon Town XI
	Goal	Report

20 September 2011 Training	Cardiff City XI	2–2	Swindon Town XI
	Goal	Report	Ferguson 30'; Francis 75'

11 October 2011 Training	Bristol City XI	2–0	Swindon Town XI
	Bolasie 50'; Amadi-Holloway	Report

8 November 2011 Training	Cardiff City XI	5–0	Swindon Town XI	Cardiff Athletics Stadium
	Farah; Meades; Keinan; Carter	Report

21 February 2012 Training	Bristol City XI	4–1	Swindon Town XI	Failand Training Ground
1300	Jackson; Woolford; Campbell-Ryce	Report	Gabilondo

=== Wiltshire Premier Shield ===
The draw for the Wiltshire Premier Shield semi-finals was made on 28 October 2011. Swindon Town was drawn to play Salisbury City with the victors scheduled to play either Chippenham Town or Swindon Supermarine in the Final.

However, it was confirmed on 13 January 2012 by Salisbury City that Swindon had withdrawn from the competition giving the South Wiltshire club a bye into the final.
