= Mattia Lanzano =

Italian footballer (born 1990)

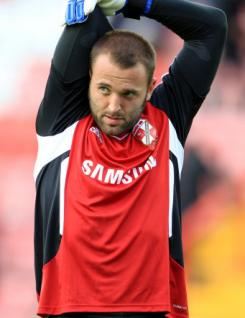

Personal information
- Date of birth: 4 July 1990 (age 36)
- Place of birth: Grosseto, Italy
- Height: 6 ft 2 in (1.88 m)
- Position: Goalkeeper

Youth career
- 2004–2008: Piacenza

Senior career*
| Years | Team | Apps | (Gls) |
| 2008–2009 | Piacenza | 0 | (0) |
| 2009–2010 | → Poggibonsi (loan) | 20 | (0) |
| 2010–2011 | → Gavorrano (loan) | 17 | (0) |
| 2011–2012 | Swindon Town | 6 | (0) |
| 2012–2013 | Gavorrano | 12 | (0) |
| 2013–2014 | Fokikos | 20 | (0) |
| 2015–2016 | Grosseto | 23 | (0) |
| 2017–2018 | Piacenza | 2 | (0) |

International career
| 2005 | Italy U16 | 1 | (0) |
| 2006 | Italy U17 | 3 | (0) |
- * Club domestic league appearances and goals as of 23 May 2018

Mattia Lanzano (born 4 July 1990) is an Italian professional footballer who plays as a goalkeeper.

== Club career ==
=== Early career ===
Lanzano began his professional career with Piacenza Calcio, but did not make an appearance for the Biancorossi during his career with the Serie B side.

In July 2009 Lanzano left Piacenza Calcio on loan to Lega Pro level for U.S. Poggibonsi before moving in June 2010 for U.S. Gavorrano the following season.

=== Swindon Town F.C. ===
On 4 July 2011, Lanzano was confirmed as Paolo Di Canio's fifth summer signing for Swindon Town by signing a two-year contract and joining fellow Italian footballers Alberto Comazzi, Alessandro Cibocchi and Raffaele De Vita at the Wiltshire club. Upon joining the club, he stated his dream to play in English football and looking forward to the challenge. Lanzano was given a number one shirt ahead of the new season.

However, he suffered a rib injury that saw him out for the start of the 2011-12 season. Following his recovery from injury, Lanzano found himself competing with Phil Smith over the first choice goalkeeper role. On 3 September 2011, manager Paulo Di Canio called up him as a starter debut for the match against Rotherham United and helped Swindon Town win 3-2. After the match, he expressed his happiness to win on his debut for the club. The next two matches saw Lanzano keep two clean sheets against Southend United and Crawley Town. His good performance against Southend United earned him a "League Two – Team of the Week".

However, in a follow-up match against Burton Albion, he was at fault when his mistake led to Jacques Maghoma scoring, as the club loss 2-0. After the match, Lanzano was dropped for one match, which manager Di Canio was concerned over his "lacking confidence". During a match against Macclesfield Town on 30 September 2011, he came on as a 51st-minute substitute for Phil Smith and conceded two goals, which Swindon Town went on lose. Lanzano conceded a total of four goals in the next two matches against Exeter City and Hereford United, which turned out to be his last appearance for the club. Following this, he dropped from the first team altogether after Di Canio signed Wes Foderingham, as well as, his own injury concern, and never played for Swindon Town again.

A month later, local newspaper Swindon Advertiser reported that Lanzano was expecting to leave the club by mutual consent after failing to settle in England. However, he made a U-turn on his decision and opted to stay at Swindon Town despite being a third choice goalkeeper. His contributions at the club resulted in their promotion to League One. At the end of the 2011-12 season, Lanzano made seven appearances in all competitions. However, ahead of the 2012-13 season, he was placed on a transfer list by Swindon Town. On 29 June 2012, Lanzano had his contract at the club terminated.

=== Fokikos F.C. ===
In August 2013, Lanzano moved to Greece, where he signed a one-year contract with Amfissa Fokikos F.C., which plays in the Football League; he took the number 28 shirt.

On 30 September 2013, made his debut in the Greek Football League for the club in a 2–2 draw over Kallithea and on 24 October 2013 in the Greek Football Cup against Olympiacos F.C.

=== F.C. Grosseto ===
In August 2015 Lanzano signed a contract for his birthplace club, F.C. Grosseto. At the end of the season, he extended his contract for another year until 2017.

== International career ==
=== U-17 ===
Lanzano was a regular for the Italy under-17 side during the team's 2007 UEFA European Under-17 Football Championship qualification campaign, under manager Luca Gotti, debuting against Andorra.

=== U-19 ===
Lanzano also received a call-up to the Italy U-19 from manager Massimo Piscedda, for a team for training camp held at Borghesiana.

== Honours ==
Swindon Town

- League Two: Champions 2011–12

Individual

- League Two Team of the Week (1): 12/09/11
