= 2012 Football League Trophy final =

2012 Football League Trophy Final
- Event: 2011–12 Football League Trophy
Chesterfield	Swindon Town
2	0
- Date: 25 March 2012
- Venue: Wembley Stadium, London
- Man of the Match: Nathan Smith (Chesterfield)
- Referee: Anthony Bates, Staffordshire
- Attendance: 49,602

The 2012 Football League Trophy Final was the 29th final of the domestic football cup competition for teams from Football Leagues One and Two, the Football League Trophy. The final was played at Wembley Stadium in London on 25 March 2012. The match was contested between Chesterfield from League One and Swindon Town from League Two. Chesterfield won the game 2–0.

== Match details ==
25 March 2012
14:00 BST

Chesterfield	2–0	Swindon Town
Risser 47' (o.g.); Westcarr 90+4'	Report

Wembley Stadium, London
Attendance: 49,602
Referee: Anthony Bates

Chesterfield	Swindon Town

GK	1	(England) Tommy Lee
RB	18	(England) James Hurst
CB	6	(Jamaica) Simon Ford
CB	5	(England) Josh Thompson
LB	28	(Jamaica) Nathan Smith
RM	25	(England) Drew Talbot
CM	7	(England) Mark Allott
CM	30	(Belgium) Franck Moussa	(substituted off) 81'
LM	16	(France) Alexandre Mendy
ST	21	(England) Jordan Bowery	(substituted off) 87'
ST	14	(England) Jack Lester	(substituted off) 37'
Substitutes:
GK	13	(Scotland) Greg Fleming
MF	23	(England) Mark Randall	(substituted on) 81'
ST	9	(England) Craig Westcarr	(substituted on) 37'
ST	10	(England) Danny Whitaker
ST	19	(England) Scott Boden	(substituted on) 87'
Manager:
(Republic of Ireland) John Sheridan

GK	35	(England) Wes Foderingham
RB	5	(England) Joe Devera
CB	13	(Namibia) Oliver Risser	(substituted off) 62'
CB	12	(Republic of Ireland) Alan McCormack
LB	2	(Scotland) Jay McEveley	(substituted off) 77'
RM	10	(Scotland) Matt Ritchie
CM	24	(England) Jonathan Smith	(substituted off) 72'
CM	8	(Scotland) Simon Ferry
LM	22	(England) Lee Holmes
ST	9	(England) Paul Benson
ST	17	(England) Alan Connell	(yellow card) 56'
Substitutes
GK	26	(England) Phil Smith
DF	27	(Italy) Alessandro Cibocchi	(substituted on) 77'
MF	14	(England) John Bostock	(substituted on) 72'
ST	23	(Italy) Raffaele De Vita
ST	34	(Republic of Ireland) Ronan Murray	(substituted on) 62'
Manager
(Italy) Paolo Di Canio

Man of the match

- Nathan Smith (Chesterfield)

MATCH OFFICIALS

- Assistant referees:
- Fourth official:

MATCH RULES

- 90 minutes
- Penalty shoot-out if scores still level
- Five named substitutes
- Maximum of three substitutions

=== Statistics ===
	Chesterfield	Swindon
Total shots	8	15
Shots on target	4	9
Ball possession	40%	60%
Corner kicks	1	11
Fouls committed	9	7
Offsides	6	0
Yellow cards	0	1
Red cards	0	0

Source: BBC Sport

== Post match ==
Chesterfield manager, John Sheridan spoke of his desire to keep Chesterfield in League One saying of the game "It's great for the fans and it's a trophy – I won't disrespect it. But I know where my loyalties lie and I'm desperate to stay in the division". Swindon manager, Paolo Di Canio described his players as mentally weak saying "Today we deserved to be a loser because we were all weak".
