= Joe Devera =

English footballer

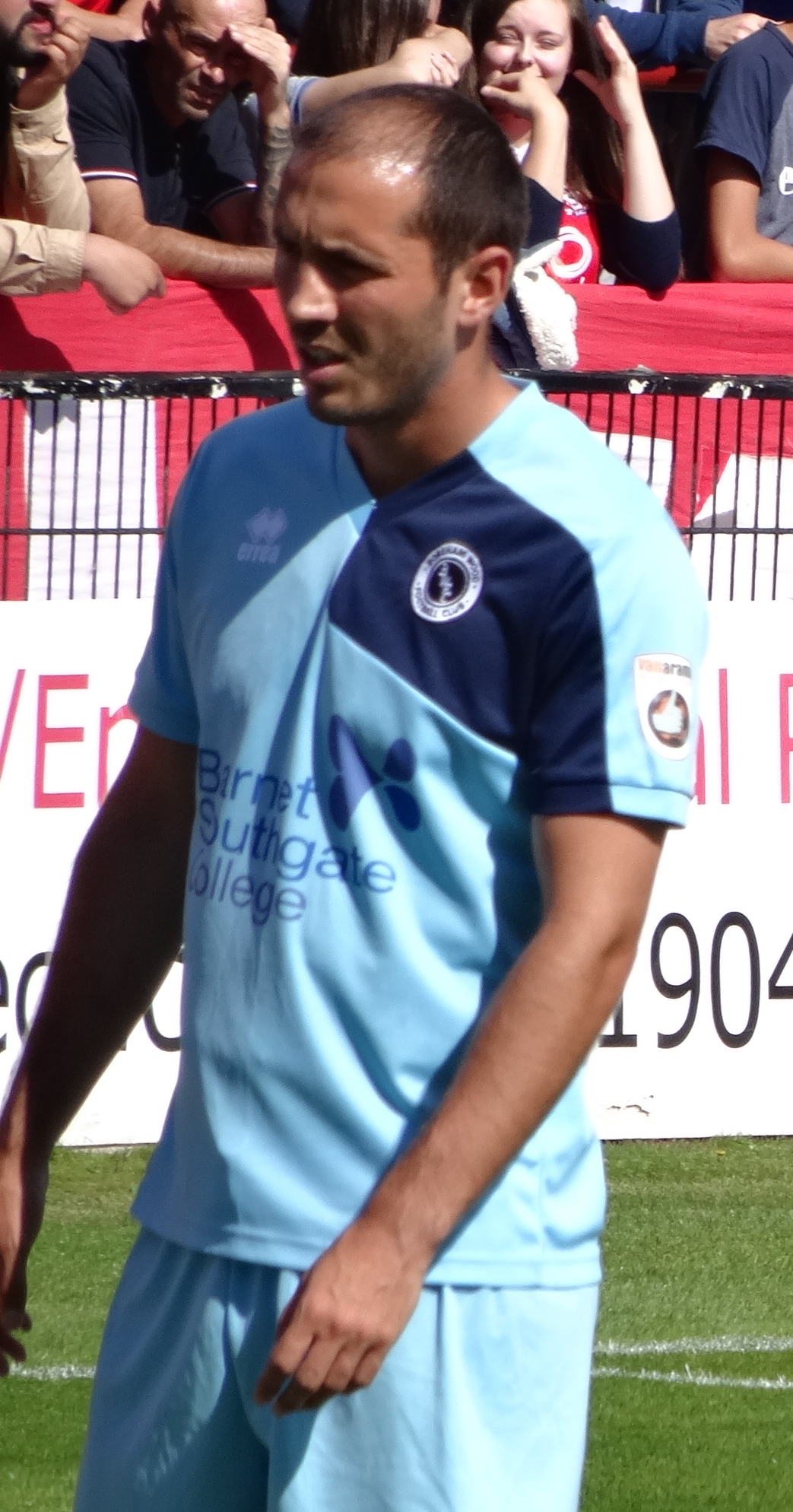
- Devera playing for Boreham Wood in 2016

Personal information
- Full name: Joseph Devera
- Date of birth: 6 February 1987 (age 39)
- Place of birth: Southgate, England
- Height: 6 ft 2 in (1.88 m)
- Position: Centre-back

Youth career
- ?–2005: Barnet

Senior career*
Years	Team	Apps	(Gls)
2005–2011	Barnet	177	(1)
2005	→ Welwyn Garden City (loan)	?	(?)
2006	→ Northwood (loan)	5	(0)
2011–2013	Swindon Town	53	(2)
2013–2015	Portsmouth	72	(1)
2015–2017	Boreham Wood	68	(1)
- * Club domestic league appearances and goals as of 29 April 2017 (UTC)

Joseph Devera (born 6 February 1987) is an English footballer who plays as a defender.

== Career ==
=== Barnet ===
Born in Southgate, London, Devera is a product of Barnet's youth system, and progressed through the ranks, where he captained the reserve side. Prior to this, Devera was at the Southgate College football academy run by Protec. On 18 January 2005, he made his Barnet debut, coming on as substitute in a Conference League Cup defeat to Grays Athletic.

In August 2006, Devera signed his first professional contract with the club, on a two–year contract. On 26 September 2006, he made his league debut for Barnet, in a 1–1 draw against Peterborough United. He then broke into the Barnet first team in the 2006–07 season. At the end of the 2006–07 season, Devera went on to make twenty–eight appearances in all competitions. During this time, he established himself as the club's first-choice right-back.

Ahead of the 2007–08 season, Devera signed a long–term contract with the club. At the start of the 2007–08 season, he started the season well when he kept a clean sheet, in a 0–0 draw against Morecambe in the opening game of the season. However, in a follow–up match against Hereford United, he was sent–off for a professional foul on Trevor Benjamin, as Barnet lost 2–1. After serving a one match suspension, Devera returned to the starting line-up on 1 September 2007, where he helped the side beat Bradford City 2–1. He started out playing in the right–back position before moving to the centre–back position halfway through the season. Devera's switch to the centre–back position proved to work well, as he performed well in number of matches that he was named Mortgage Express Barnet player-of-the-month award for January. As the 2007–08 season progressed, Devara found himself rotating in right–back position and centre–back position. However, he suffered a hamstring injury that saw him sidelined for the rest of the season. At the end of the 2007–08 season, Devera made forty–five appearances in all competitions. For his performance, he won both Barnet's player of the year and the most improved player award, which is considered his "highlights at Barnet".

Ahead of the 2008–09 season, Devera was linked a move away from Barnet, as he was monitored by "higher-league clubs". Despite this, he stayed at the club and was featured captain throughout the club's pre–season tour. At the start of the 2008–09 season, Devera continued to rotate in playing at the left–back position, right–back position and centre–back position. Since the start of the 2008–09 season, Devera started in every match in the league until he suffered a ligament damage that kept him out between for four to six weeks. On 17 January 2009, Devera returned to the first team from injury, as they drew 1–1 against Dagenham & Redbridge. He then scored his first Barnet goal on 21 February 2009, in a 4–1 win over Bradford City. At the end of the 2008–09 season, Devera went on to make thirty–six appearances and scoring once in all competitions.

At the start of the 2009–10 season, however, Devera found himself behind the pecking order in the club's defence and was placed on the substitute bench. He made his first appearance of the season, coming on as a substitute in extra time, as Barnet lose 2–0 against Watford on 26 August 2009. Devera was soon plagued by injuries and was out for almost two months. On 26 December 2009, he returned to the starting line-up, in a 4–0 loss against Aldershot Town. Since returning to the starting line-up from injury, Devera regained his first team place for the rest of the season. At the end of the 2009–10 season, he went on thirty–four appearances in all competitions.

At the start of the 2010–11 season, however, Devera suffered an injury that saw him miss two matches between 14 August 2010 and 21 August 2010. He then returned to the starting line-up on 28 August 2010, in a 1–1 draw against Bury. Devera continued to regain his first team for the side for the rest of the season, where he played in the centre–back position from the right–back position. His performance at the club this season was praised by Manager Paul Fairclough. On 19 February 2011, Devera scored his second goal for Barnet, in a 1–1 draw against Cheltenham Town. He then captained Barnet for the first time in his career on 8 March 2011, where Barnet lost 1–0 against Wycombe Wanderers. In the last game of the season against Port Vale, Devera captained the side, in a 1–0 win. On 8 May 2011, he was announced as Barnet's most improved and best player of the 2010–11 campaign. At the end of the 2010–11 season, Devera made forty–five appearances and scoring once in all competitions.

Shortly at the end of the 2010–11 season, Devera was offered a new contract by the club. However, he rejected a new contract the following month. He went on to make 202 appearances at Underhill in his 6 years for the senior side.

=== Swindon Town ===
On 13 June 2011, Devera signed for Swindon Town in League Two, as new manager Paolo Di Canio's first signing. Upon joining the club, he was given a number five shirt for the side. He stated the move was to play under Di Canio.

Devera made his Swindon Town debut in the opening game of the season, starting the whole game, in a 3–0 win over Crewe Alexandra. Since joining the club, he became a first team regular for the side despite facing strong competitions, under the management of Di Canio. This lasted until mid-October when he found himself demoted to the substitute bench in a number of matches, as well as, his own injury concern. On 31 December 2011, Devera returned to the starting line-up before being substituted in the 74th minute, in 2–1 win over Northampton Town. Following his return, he regained his first team place despite suffering from a toe injury. It was further cemented following an injury of Aden Flint, and after his return, Devera played in the right–back position. He scored his first goal for Swindon Town on 30 January 2012, in a 4–1 win over Southend United. Devera then started as a right–back position in the Football League Trophy final against Chesterfield, where they lost 2–0. On 6 March 2012, he scored his second goal for the club came, in a 4–0 win over Dagenham & Redbridge. In late–April, Devera, along with three other players, to be dropped from the squad after being involved late-night drinking session and he never played for the rest of the 2011–12 season, due to injury. Despite this, he was part of the team that was promoted to League One in the 2011–12 season, as winning the League Two title was Devera's first honour as a player. At the end of the 2011–12 season, Devera made thirty–five appearances and scoring two times in all competitions.

In the 2012–13 season, Devera started the season where he became a first team regular, playing in the right–back position. However, he soon lost his place in the right–back position to Nathan Thompson and was demoted to the substitute bench. Despite this, Devera's first team run continued, as he began to play in the centre–back position. However, Devera was sidelined with a hamstring injury and was eventually placed on the substitute bench. On 9 March 2013, he returned to the first team, coming on as a late substitute, in a 2–2 draw against Walsall. Devera later featured in the remaining three league matches of the season, starting all of them. Devera was part of the 'Robins' side that reached the play-offs and faced Brentford. Swindon lost on penalties in the second leg of the semi-finals but Devera managed to score a goal. The semi-final second leg was Devera's last game for Swindon and he was released after making 66 appearances in all competitions.

=== Portsmouth ===
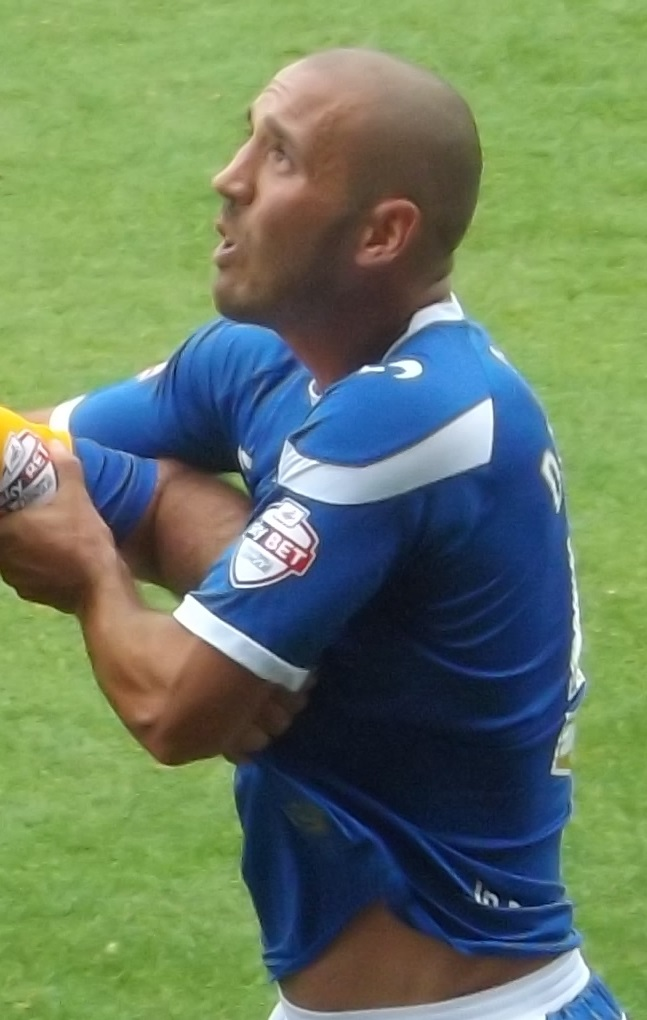
Devera playing for Portsmouth in 2013.

On 14 May 2013, Devera signed for League Two side Portsmouth on a two-year contract. Upon joining the club, he was given a number five shirt for the side.

Devera made his debut in a 4–1 home defeat to Oxford United on 3 August 2013, where he started the whole game. In the next two matches against AFC Bournemouth and Accrington Stanley, he captained Portsmouth on two occasions, as the side lost and drew respectively. Since joining the club, Devera became a first team regular for the side. He started in every match until he suffered a hamstring injury early in the first half, in a 2–1 win over Burton Albion on 14 September 2013. After missing out two matches, Devera returned to the first team on 5 October 2013, starting the whole game, in a 3–0 win over Rochdale. He regained his first team place, playing in both centre-back and a right-back positions until he suffered a knee injury in mid–February. On 3 March 2014, Devera returned to the starting line-up from injury, in a 0–0 draw against Chesterfield. As the 2013–14 season progressed, he was soon demoted to the substitute bench. Despite this, Devera finished his first season at Portsmouth, making thirty–seven appearances in all competitions.

In the 2014–15 season, Devera continued to fight for his first team place, although he was demoted to the substitute bench. Devera spent most of the 2014–15 season, playing in the centre-back and a right-back position. On 15 October 2014, he scored his first goal for the club, in a 3–2 win over Stevenage. Despite being sidelined on two occasions during the 2014–15 season, he went on to make forty–three appearances and scoring once in all competitions.

Devera was a first-choice for Portsmouth over the course of two seasons, being mainly deployed as a centre-back and a right-back. It was announced on 18 May 2015 that his contract would not be renewed, and that he would be leaving at the end of the season.

=== Boreham Wood ===
After being released by Portsmouth, Devera joined Boreham Wood on 16 September 2015.

He made his Boreham Wood debut three days later on 19 September 2015, starting the whole game, in a 1–0 loss against Wrexham. He then scored his first goal for the club, in a 2–0 win over Welling United on 10 October 2015. Since making his debut for the club, Devera became a first team regular, playing in the centre–back position or right–back position. This lasts until he suffered an illness that saw him miss two matches. Devera didn't return to the first team until on 13 February 2016 against Grimsby Town, where he kept a clean sheet, in a 0–0 draw. Following his return, Devara regained his first team place for the side for the rest of the season. At the end of the 2015–16 season, he went on to make twenty–nine appearances and scoring once in all competitions for the side. For his performance this season, Devera signed a new contract with the club.

In the 2016–17 season, Devera began rotating in different positions, playing in the left–back positions and centre–back positions. He was also given the club's captaincy for the new season as well. In March 2017, he signed a new contract with the club for another season. Despite being sidelined with injuries during the 2016–17 season, Devera went on to make forty–three appearances in all competitions.

By the time he departed Boreham Wood, he played for the side between 2015 and 2017, making 72 appearances and scoring one goal.

== Personal life ==
In March 2011, he announced that he wanted to play for the Venezuela national football team, Venezuela being his father's country of birth.

Devera attended Barnet and Southgate College, where he attended construction sessions for three years before starting his football career.

== Career statistics ==
As of 15 July 2017.

Appearances and goals by club, season and competition
Club	Season	League			FA Cup		League Cup		Other^{1}		Total	
Club	Season	Division	Apps	Goals	Apps	Goals	Apps	Goals	Apps	Goals	Apps	Goals
Barnet	2004–05	Conference National	0	0	—		—		1	0	1	0
Barnet	2005–06	League Two	0	0	—		—		1	0	1	0
Barnet	2006–07	League Two	26	0	3	0	2	0	2	0	33	0
Barnet	2007–08	League Two	41	0	6	0	1	0	1	0	49	0
Barnet	2008–09	League Two	34	1	1	0	1	0	—		36	1
Barnet	2009–10	League Two	33	0	—		1	0	2	0	36	0
Barnet	2010–11	League Two	43	1	2	0	—		1	0	46	1
Barnet	Total		177	2	12	0	5	0	8	0	202	2
Northwood (loan)	2005–06	Southern FL Premier Division	5	0	—		—		—		5	0
Swindon Town	2011–12	League Two	28	2	1	0	1	0	5	0	35	2
Swindon Town	2012–13	League One	25	0	—		3	0	3	1	31	1
Swindon Town	Total		53	2	1	0	4	0	8	1	66	3
Portsmouth	2013–14	League Two	33	0	1	0	1	0	2	0	37	0
Portsmouth	2014–15	League Two	39	1	1	0	2	0	1	0	43	1
Portsmouth	Total		72	1	2	0	3	0	3	0	80	1
Boreham Wood	2015–16	National League	27	1	2	0	—		0	0	29	1
Boreham Wood	2016–17	National League	41	0	2	0	—		0	0	43	0
Boreham Wood	Total		68	1	4	0	0	0	0	0	72	1
Career total			377	6	16	0	12	0	18	1	424	7

^{1} Including Football League Trophy, Football League play-offs and Conference League Cup.

== Honours ==
Swindon Town

- Football League Two: 2011–12
- Football League Trophy runner-up: 2011–12
