= Oliver Risser =

Footballer (born 1980)

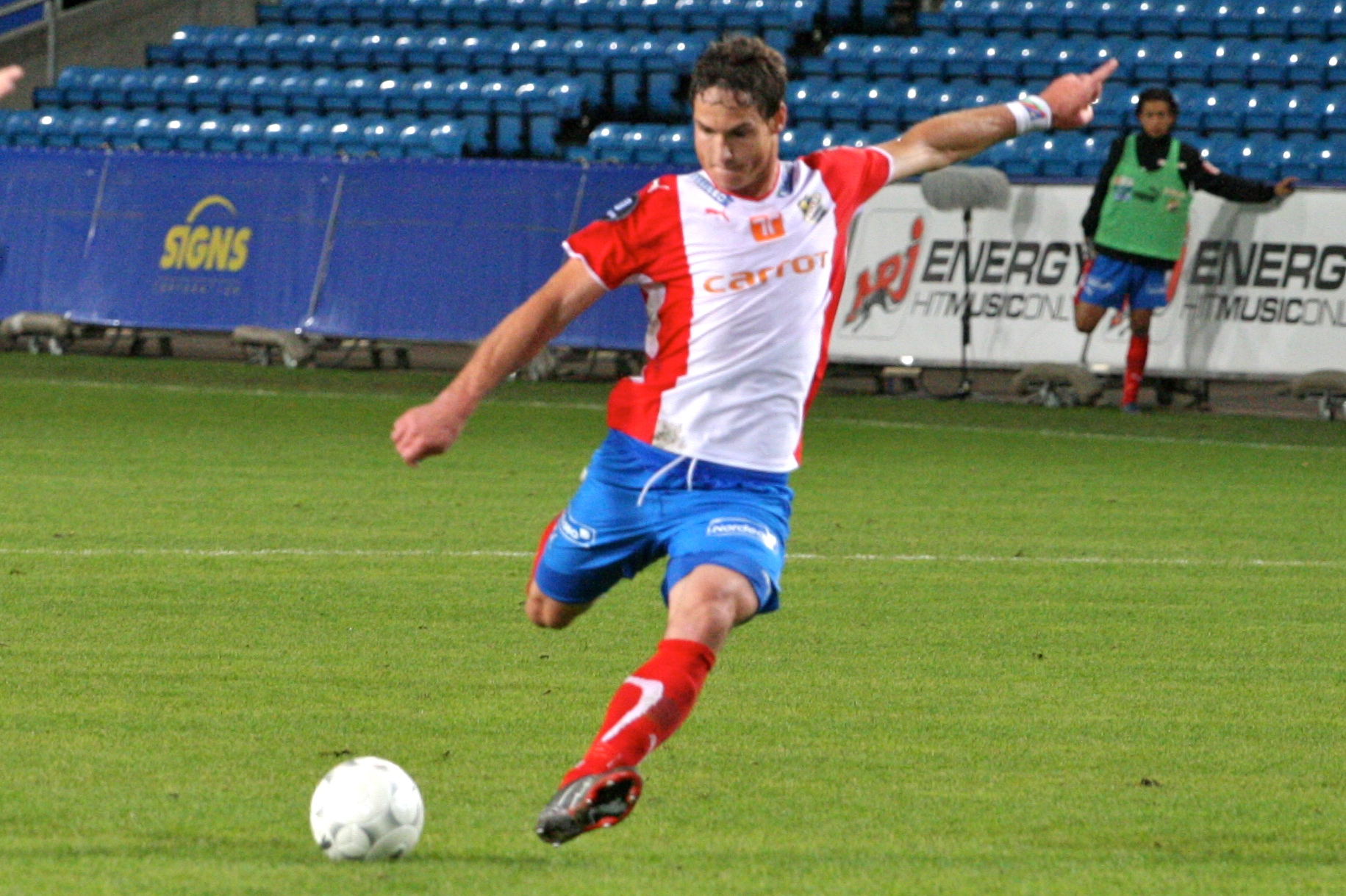
- Risser playing for Lyn in 2009

Personal information
- Full name: Oliver Hanjorge Risser
- Date of birth: 17 September 1980 (age 46)
- Place of birth: Windhoek, South West Africa, South Africa (now Namibia)
- Height: 1.88 m (6 ft 2 in)
- Position: Midfielder

Youth career
- Ramblers FC

Senior career*
Years	Team	Apps	(Gls)
1999–2003	SpVgg EGC Wirges	22	(0)
2003–2005	Borussia Dortmund II	33	(1)
2005–2006	SV Sandhausen	28	(0)
2006	Breidablik	6	(0)
2006–2007	Bonner SC	32	(2)
2008	Hannover 96 II	7	(0)
2009	Manglerud Star	7	(1)
2009	→ Lyn (loan)	7	(0)
2010	Lyn	11	(1)
2010–2011	KuPS	8	(0)
2011–2013	Swindon Town	32	(3)
2012–2013	→ Stevenage (loan)	12	(1)
2013	Aldershot Town	14	(0)
2013	Oosterzonen Oosterwijk	7	(0)
Total		226	(9)

International career
2002–2011	Namibia	31	(0)
- * Club domestic league appearances and goals

Oliver Hanjorge Risser (born 17 September 1980) is a Namibian former professional footballer who played as a midfielder. He represented Namibia internationally as well as having spells playing in Norway, Finland, England and Belgium.

== Club career ==
Born in Windhoek, Risser started his senior career with SpVgg EGC Wirges in 1999 and moved to Borussia Dortmund's reserve team in 2003, spending two seasons with the club in the German third division. He spent most of the 2005–06 season with SV Sandhausen in Oberliga Baden-Württemberg, one of the leagues in the fourth tier of German football. In April 2006, he moved to Icelandic first-division side Breidablik for three months, before returning to fourth-division football in Germany and signing with Bonner SC of Oberliga Nordrhein, where spent the entire 2006–07 season. He moved to Hannover 96 II in January 2008 after a few months without a club, but left the club at the end of the season. After another eight months without a club, Risser moved to Norway, joining Manglerud Star in March 2009.

On 21 August 2009, Lyn agreed a loan deal for him from Manglerud Star.

In June 2011, Risser went on a one-week trial with English League Two side Swindon Town, and after three days, manager Paolo Di Canio announced that Risser was to be offered a contract. He signed a two-year deal along with Ibrahim Atiku on the same day, 10 July. Ten days later, on 20 July, he was named Swindon captain for the 2011–12 season. He made a goalscoring debut for Swindon, netting the club's second goal with a 30-yard strike against Crewe Alexandra in a 3–0 win at The County Ground on the opening day of the season. In October 2011, Risser was replaced by Paul Caddis as club captain after losing his place in the side due to a groin injury. He scored his second goal for the club in a 1–1 draw against AFC Wimbledon in the Football League Trophy on 8 November 2011, a game in which Swindon went on to win 3–1 on penalties. Risser received the first red card of his Swindon career in a 2–1 away win against Northampton Town, receiving a straight red card for a tackle on Northampton's John Johnson. He went on to score two further goals during the campaign, in 2–0 victories against Torquay United and Barnet respectively. Risser made 40 appearances during the season, scoring four goals, as Swindon were promoted to League One as champions.

In August 2012, Risser joined League One side Stevenage on loan until January 2013, with a view to a permanent move. He made his Stevenage debut in the club's 3–2 loss to Dagenham & Redbridge in the Football League Trophy on 4 September 2012. Risser scored his first goal for Stevenage in a 1–1 draw against Doncaster Rovers at the Keepmoat Stadium on 22 September; netting with a glancing header from a Filipe Morais cross. He went on to make 13 appearances during the loan spell, although Stevenage turned down the option to make the move permanent, and Risser returned to his parent club in January 2013.

Shortly after returning to Swindon, it was announced that Risser had left the club after his contract was terminated by mutual consent. He subsequently signed for League Two side Aldershot Town on a free transfer on 6 January. Under manager Dean Holdsworth, he was a regular fixture in the side but after the arrival of new manager Andy Scott he was limited to appearances on the bench. By the end of the season he had made 15 appearances for Aldershot, scoring no goals. Risser was then believed to be one of the thirteen players made redundant as a result of the club going to administration.

== International career ==
Risser earned 31 caps for the Namibia national team and represented Namibia at the 2008 African Cup of Nations.

== Personal life ==
Risser's younger brother, Wilko, is also a footballer.

== Career statistics ==
=== Club ===
Appearances and goals by club, season and competition
Club	Season	League			National cup		League cup		Other		Total	
Club	Season	Division	Apps	Goals	Apps	Goals	Apps	Goals	Apps	Goals	Apps	Goals
SpVgg EGC Wirges	2000–01		0	0	0	0	–		0	0	0	0
SpVgg EGC Wirges	2001–02		21	0	0	0	–		0	0	21	0
SpVgg EGC Wirges	2002–03		1	0	0	0	–		0	0	1	0
SpVgg EGC Wirges	Total		22	0	0	0	0	0	0	0	22	0
Borussia Dortmund II	2003–04	Regionalliga Nord	20	1	0	0	–		0	0	20	1
Borussia Dortmund II	2004–05	Regionalliga Nord	13	0	0	0	–		0	0	13	0
Borussia Dortmund II	Total		33	1	0	0	0	0	0	0	33	1
SV Sandhausen	2005–06		28	0	0	0	–		0	0	28	0
Breiðablik	2006	Úrvalsdeild	6	0	0	0	0	0	0	0	6	0
Bonner SC	2006–07	Oberliga Nordrhein	32	2	0	0	–		0	0	32	2
Hannover 96 II	2007–08	Oberliga Nord	7	0	0	0	–		0	0	7	0
Manglerud Star	2009		7	1	0	0	0	0	0	0	7	1
Lyn (loan)	2009	Eliteserien	7	0	0	0	0	0	0	0	7	0
Lyn	2010	Norwegian First Division	11	1	3	0	0	0	0	0	14	1
KuPS	2010	Veikkausliiga	8	0	0	0	0	0	0	0	8	0
KuPS	2011	Veikkausliiga	0	0	0	0	0	0	0	0	0	0
KuPS	Total		8	0	0	0	0	0	0	0	8	0
Swindon Town	2011–12	League Two	32	3	3	0	0	0	5 (Note: Appearance(s) in Football League Trophy)	1	40	4
Stevenage (loan)	2012–13	League One	12	1	0	0	0	0	1	0	13	1
Aldershot Town	2012–13	League Two	14	0	1	0	0	0	0	0	15	0
Oosterzonen Oosterwijk	2013–14	Belgian Second Amateur Division	7	0	0	0	0	0	0	0	7	0
Career total			226	9	7	0	0	0	6	1	239	10

=== International ===
Appearances and goals by national team and year
National team	Year	Apps	Goals
Namibia	2002	1	0
Namibia	2003	4	0
Namibia	2004	1	0
Namibia	2005	1	0
Namibia	2006	1	0
Namibia	2007	8	0
Namibia	2008	8	0
Namibia	2009	3	0
Namibia	2010	2	0
Namibia	2011	3	0
Total		31	0

== Honours ==
Swindon Town

- Football League Two: 2011–12
- Football League Trophy runner-up: 2011–12
