= David Lucas (footballer) =

English footballer (born 1977)

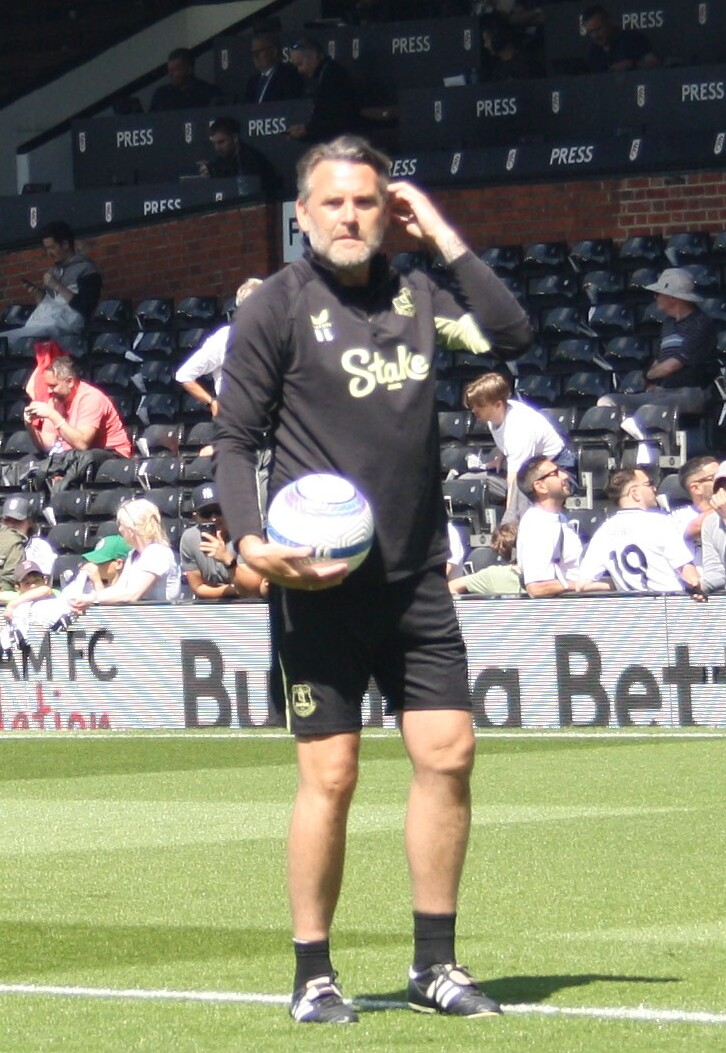
- Lucas in 2025

Personal information
- Full name: David Anthony Lucas
- Date of birth: 23 November 1977 (age 48)
- Place of birth: Preston, England
- Height: 6 ft 1 in (1.85 m)
- Position: Goalkeeper

Team information
- Current team: Everton (goalkeeping coach)

Senior career*
Years	Team	Apps	(Gls)
1994–2004	Preston North End	123	(0)
1995	→ Darlington (loan)	6	(0)
1996	→ Darlington (loan)	7	(0)
1996–1997	→ Scunthorpe United (loan)	6	(0)
2003	→ Sheffield Wednesday (loan)	7	(0)
2003–2004	→ Sheffield Wednesday (loan)	10	(0)
2004–2006	Sheffield Wednesday	52	(0)
2007	Barnsley	3	(0)
2007–2009	Leeds United	16	(0)
2009–2011	Swindon Town	65	(0)
2011–2012	Rochdale	16	(0)
2012–2013	Birmingham City	0	(0)
2013–2015	Fleetwood Town	2	(0)
Total		313	(0)

International career
1995–1996	England U18	5	(0)
1997	England U20	4	(0)
- * Club domestic league appearances and goals

David Anthony Lucas (born 23 November 1977) is an English football coach and former professional footballer who is a professional goalkeeping coach.

Between 1994 and 2015, Lucas made over 300 appearances in the Football League, including 123 for Preston North End.

Lucas began his career at his hometown club Preston North End in the Football League Third Division. He spent time on loan at Darlington, Scunthorpe United, and Sheffield Wednesday, before signing for Sheffield Wednesday in 2004. He then joined rivals Barnsley in 2007, but only made three appearances for them before signing with Leeds United in the same year. After spending much of the 2007–08 season as an unused substitute, he began to establish himself as the first choice goalkeeper at Elland Road, impressing manager Gary McAllister with a series of good displays continuing into the following season. He made a number of appearances before being dropped in December, subsequently only appearing on the bench. He signed for Swindon Town in June 2009. Lucas had a successful season in which he played a major part in Swindon reaching the Football League One play-offs. Lucas' contract with Swindon was terminated one year early by mutual consent, and he signed a one-year deal with Rochdale on 3 August 2011, taking up a player/coach role. Lucas was released by Rochdale at the end of the season, before he signed a one-year contract with Championship club Birmingham City on 10 July 2012. He made one appearance before leaving when the January 2013 transfer window opened, to join League Two club Fleetwood Town, reuniting with former Preston North End teammates Graham Alexander, who was manager of Fleetwood, at the time and first team coach Chris Lucketti.

Lucas has played internationally for England, five times at under-18 and four times at under-20 level.

Lucas is working as the first team goalkeeping coach at Everton.

== Club career ==
=== Preston North End ===
As a young goalkeeper, Lucas started his career at Preston North End. He went on to spend nearly ten years as a professional at the Lancashire club, punctuated by loan appearances for Darlington, Scunthorpe and Sheffield Wednesday. Lucas was capped by England under-18 and under-20 teams while a Preston player.

Whilst at Preston, he won two divisional championship medals in 1996 and 2000 as North End won the third and second division titles and, in May 2001, he was part of Preston's unsuccessful first division playoff final team that lost 3-0 to Bolton.

Regularly sharing glove duty with Preston's other goalkeeper Teuvo Moilanen, Lucas remained at his boyhood club until 2004 when, like his Finnish counterpart, he was moved on by new manager Craig Brown.

=== Sheffield Wednesday ===
Lucas had another spell at Sheffield Wednesday, having signed a permanent deal with the Yorkshire side in the summer of 2004 after impressing during his two loan spells the previous season. During Wednesday's promotion season of 2004–05, Lucas made 41 appearances for the team and totalled 15 clean sheets, despite twice having to battle against injuries.

Lucas started the first 18 matches of Sheffield Wednesday's 2005–06 campaign before a knee injury again ruled him out until January. His comeback was short-lived and Lucas was injured again against Millwall on 4 February 2006 after playing only two full games; the new injury again ruled him out until January 2007.

Lucas announced that he would not be renewing his contract with Sheffield Wednesday at the end of the 2005–06 season, although he continued to receive treatment at their training ground whilst he was recovering from his knee injury.

=== Barnsley ===
Lucas subsequently joined South Yorkshire rivals Barnsley on a free transfer in January 2007, but only made three appearances for them. During his second game for Barnsley, he came out to deal with a high ball and collided with the Derby County player Giles Barnes. He was knocked unconscious and left the field on a spinal board after several minutes' treatment. He was expected to need at least ten days to recover from concussion.

=== Leeds United ===
Lucas signed for Leeds United in September 2007 on a short-term contract, making his debut in the Football League Trophy second round against Darlington.

He was released in May 2009.

=== Swindon Town ===
Lucas signed for Swindon Town in June 2009 on a two-year contract. He was assigned the number 1 jersey with previous incumbent Phil Smith being relegated to the number 12. Lucas had a successful season, which played a major part in Swindon reaching the Football League One play-offs. He played in both legs of the semi-final against Charlton Athletic, but injured his shoulder in the second minute of the second leg and played no further part in the competition.

=== Rochdale ===
Lucas' contract with Swindon was terminated one year early by mutual consent, and he signed a one-year deal with Rochdale on 3 August 2011, taking up a player/coach role. He made his Rochdale playing debut in the League Cup against Chesterfield on 9 August. Lucas was released by Rochdale at the end of the season.

=== Birmingham City and Fleetwood Town ===
Lucas signed a one-year contract with Championship club Birmingham City on 10 July 2012. He made his debut on 14 August in the first round of the League Cup at home to Barnet. That was the only appearance he made before leaving when the January 2013 transfer window opened. He joined League Two club Fleetwood Town, reuniting with former Preston North End teammates Graham Alexander, now manager of Fleetwood, and first team coach Chris Lucketti. He joined as goalkeeping coach while retaining his playing registration. He made his league début for Fleetwood on 16 February 2013 against Burton Albion coming on as a substitute in the 57th minute with the game at 0-0 after regular goalkeeper Scott Davies was sent off; Lucas proceeded to let in four goals as the game ended in a 4–0 defeat.

== Honours ==
Preston North End

- Football League Second Division: 1999–2000

Sheffield Wednesday

- Football League One play-offs: 2005

Fleetwood Town

- Football League Two play-offs: 2014
