= Christian Paoletti =

Italian footballer (born 1984)

Personal information
- Full name: Christian Paoletti
- Date of birth: December 12, 1984 (age 41)
- Place of birth: Florence, Italy
- Height: 1.87 m (6 ft 2 in)
- Position: Goalkeeper

Youth career
- 2002-2004: Empoli

Senior career*
Years	Team	Apps	(Gls)
2004–2005	Empoli	0	(0)
2005–2006	Sansovino	0	(0)
2006–2007	Bolzano	33	(0)
2007–2009	Cisco Roma	5	(0)
2009–2010	Cassino	1	(0)
2010-2012	Atletico Roma		
2012-2014	Jolly & Montemurlo		
2014	VF Colligiana		
2014-2015	Pietrasanta		
2015-2016	Aglianese		
- * Club domestic league appearances and goals

Christian Paoletti (born 12 December 1984) was an Italian footballer. He played as a goalkeeper.
