= Matt Clark (footballer) =

English footballer

Personal information
- Full name: Matthew Alec William Clark
- Date of birth: 16 November 1992 (age 33)
- Place of birth: Swindon, England
- Position: Midfielder

Team information
- Current team: North Leigh

Youth career
- 2009–2011: Swindon Town

Senior career*
Years	Team	Apps	(Gls)
2011–2012	Swindon Town	1	(0)
2011	→ Oxford City (loan)	1	(0)
2012–2013	Salisbury City	18	(0)
2013	→ Frome Town (loan)	7	(1)
2013–2014	Frome Town	0	(0)
2014–	North Leigh	0	(0)
- * Club domestic league appearances and goals as of 19:00, 29 January 2014 (UTC)

Matt Clark (born 16 November 1992) is an English football midfielder who plays for Southern League side North Leigh.

== Career ==
Swindon born Clark started his career as a junior at his local club and progressed through the Centre of Excellence at The County Ground. Along with Abdul Said, Clark signed his first professional contract in April 2011, after helping the youth side win their third successive league title during the 2010–11 season. He made his professional debut in a 2–0 League One victory at Tranmere Rovers on 7 May 2011 as a late substitute. In January 2012 Clark was released from his contract at Swindon, and later joined Conference South side Salisbury City after a short time on trial at Forest Green Rovers. He made his debut coming off the bench in Salisbury's 1–1 draw with Dover Athletic, however he was later sent off in the same game after raising his hands to an opponent.

In June 2012, Clark signed a new one-year contract at Salisbury. In March 2013 he joined Frome Town on a one-month loan deal, playing seven games and netting once for the Robins. He joined Frome permanently following his departure from Salisbury. In January 2014, he joined Southern League side North Leigh.
