= Michael Wojtanowicz =

Austrian footballer

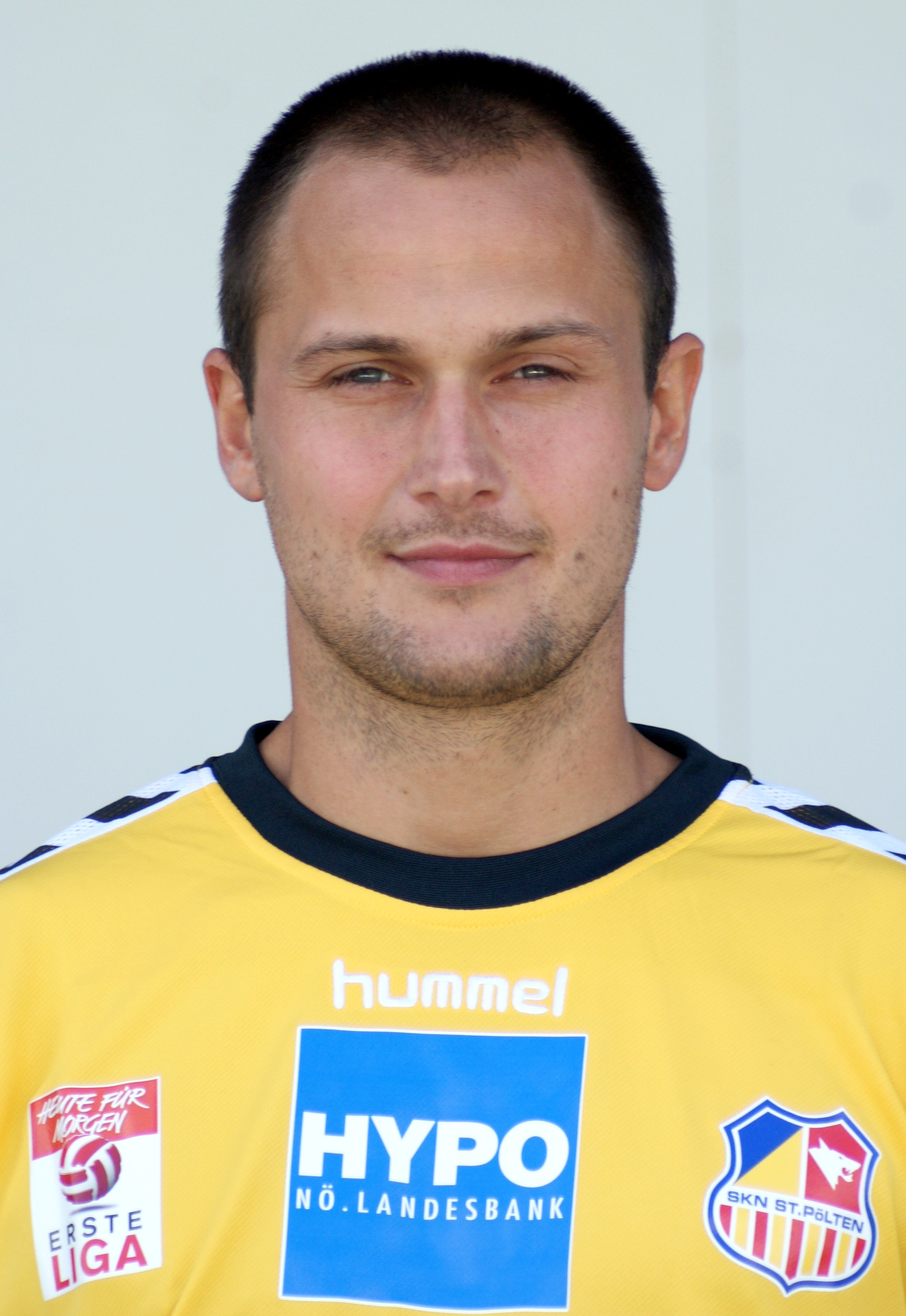

Personal information
- Full name: Michael Wojtanowicz
- Date of birth: 9 March 1985 (age 41)
- Place of birth: Krems an der Donau, Austria
- Height: 1.93 m (6 ft 4 in)
- Position: Striker

Team information
- Current team: SKN St. Pölten
- Number: 8

Youth career
- SV Haitzendorf
- BNZ St. Pölten

Senior career*
Years	Team	Apps	(Gls)
2003–2004	SV Pasching	5	(0)
2004–2005	SC Untersiebenbrunn	2	(0)
2005–2006	SV Pasching	1	(0)
2006	TSV 1860 Munich II	14	(2)
2006–2007	FC Lustenau 07	5	(0)
2007–2011	SKN St. Pölten	95	(40)

International career
- Austria U-17
- Austria U-19
	Austria U-21	1	(0)
- * Club domestic league appearances and goals as of 25 September 2010

Michael Wojtanowicz (Polish: Michał Wojtanowicz; born 9 March 1985) is an Austrian footballer of Polish origin.

== Career ==
Wojtanowicz began his professional career 2003 at the SV Pasching. For the first round of the 2004/05 season he was loaned to the SC Untersiebenbrunn. For the second half of the 2005/06 season he moved to TSV 1860 Munich II. After half a year there, he moved to FC Lustenau 07. For the season he went to the SKN St. Pölten. 2011 Wojtanowicz will leave the club after four successful seasons.

As of 10 August 2011 Michael is on trial at English League Two side Swindon Town managed by Paolo Di Canio.
