= Lander Gabilondo =

Spanish footballer

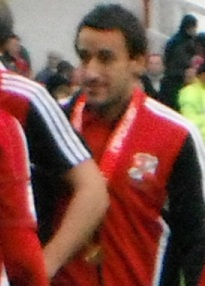

Personal information
- Full name: Lander Gabilondo Bernal
- Date of birth: 30 April 1987 (age 39)
- Place of birth: San Sebastián, Spain
- Height: 1.74 m (5 ft 8 1/2 in)
- Position: Winger

Youth career
- 2004–2005: Antiguoko
- 2005–2006: Real Sociedad

Senior career*
Years	Team	Apps	(Gls)
2006–2009	Real Sociedad B	99	(11)
2009–2011	Osasuna B	58	(7)
2011–2012	Swindon Town	10	(0)
2012–2013	Amorebieta	27	(2)
2013–2014	Real Unión	25	(0)
2014–2015	Formentera	11	(5)
2015–2016	Leioa	41	(5)
Total		271	(30)
- * Club domestic league appearances and goals

Lander Gabilondo Bernal (born 30 April 1987) is a Spanish former professional footballer who played mainly as a right winger.

== Club career ==
=== Reserve teams ===
Born in San Sebastián, Basque Country, Gabilondo finished his youth career with local Real Sociedad. After appearing in one Segunda División B game in 2005–06 with the B side, while still a junior (a 1–1 home draw against Zalla UC on 26 February 2006 where he featured as a right-back), he went on to spend three full seasons with them in that tier.

From 2009 to 2011, Gabilondo continued to play in the third division, with CA Osasuna B.

=== Swindon Town ===
Gabilondo joined English Football League Two club Swindon Town on trial in August 2011, signing a one-year contract on the 19th. He made his debut for his new team on 21 August, in a 1–2 home defeat to Oxford United.

Swindon promoted to Football League One at the end of the season, but Gabilondo took part in less than one quarter of the league matches. He was released in May 2012.

=== Later career ===
Gabilondo returned to Spain in summer 2013, agreeing to a deal at third-division SD Amorebieta. He remained in that league until his retirement aged 30, representing Real Unión and SD Leioa; additionally, he started the 2014–15 campaign in the Tercera División with SD Formentera.

== Honours ==
Swindon Town

- Football League Two: 2011–12
