= Phil Smith (footballer, born 1979) =

English footballer (born 1979)

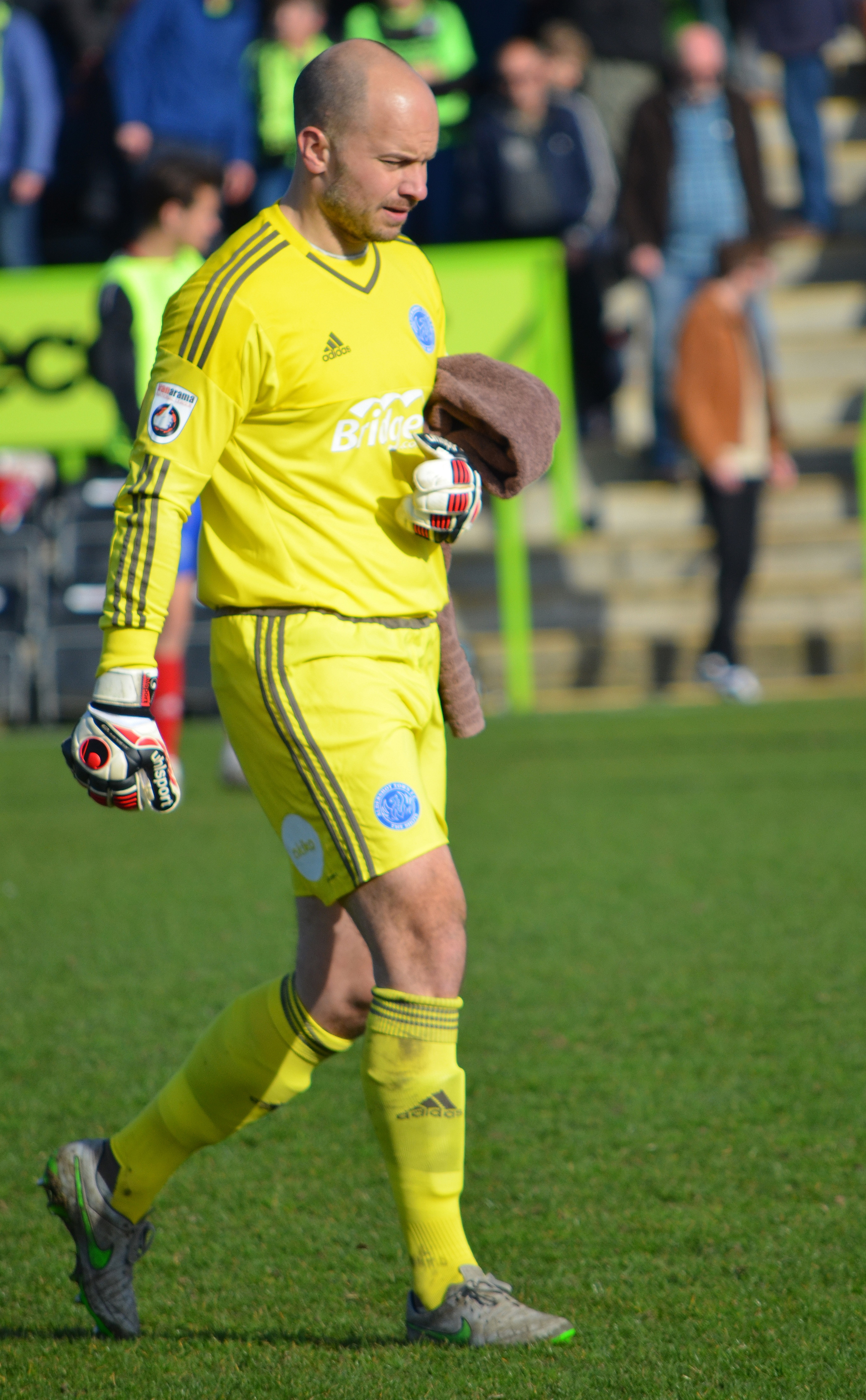
- Smith with Aldershot Town in 2016

Personal information
- Full name: Philip Anthony Smith
- Date of birth: 14 December 1979 (age 46)
- Place of birth: Harrow, London, England
- Height: 6 ft 1 in (1.85 m)
- Position: Goalkeeper

Youth career
- –1998: Millwall

Senior career*
Years	Team	Apps	(Gls)
1998–2001	Millwall	5	(0)
1998	→ Bromley (loan)	2	(0)
1999	→ Ashford Town (loan)	16	(0)
2000	→ Croydon (loan)		
2000	→ Walton & Hersham (loan)		
2001	Folkestone Invicta	1	(0)
2001–2002	Dover Athletic	13	(0)
2002–2004	Margate	64	(0)
2004–2006	Crawley Town	73	(0)
2006–2012	Swindon Town	112	(0)
2012–2014	Portsmouth	4	(0)
2013	→ Dartford (loan)	3	(0)
2014–2016	Aldershot Town	84	(0)
2017–2018	Weston-super-Mare		

International career
2005	England C	1	(0)
- * Club domestic league appearances and goals as of 18:37, 13 April 2016 (UTC)

Philip Anthony Smith (born 14 December 1979) is a former English professional footballer who played as a goalkeeper.

== Career ==
=== Millwall and non-League football ===
Born in Harrow, London, Smith started his career with Millwall for whom he played 5 league matches in the 1998–1999 season. He remained on Millwalls books until 2001 without making any further appearances but was loaned to non-league clubs Bromley, Ashford Town, Croydon and Walton & Hersham. Whilst at Walton & Hersham Smith scored a (wind-assisted) goal against Barton Rovers. On his release from Millwall in 2001 he reverted to non-league football, briefly with Folkestone Invicta and then with Dover Athletic.

=== Margate ===
Commencing in July 2002 Smith played at Football Conference club Margate for two seasons playing a total of 64 league matches. In his second season he was ever-present in the team playing a total of 55 competitive matches.

=== Crawley Town ===
In July 2004 Smith signed for Crawley Town, where he was regular first choice goalkeeper for the Red Devils. He made his debut on 30 August 2004, against Dagenham & Redbridge, and kept a clean sheet. In his first season, Smith made 35 appearances, followed by 39 in his second. Crawley went into administration in 2006 and subsequently made all of their players available for transfer.

=== Swindon Town ===
Smith signed for Swindon Town after a successful pre-season trial which included winning the Copa Ibiza friendly competition in the summer of 2006. Smith move to Swindon was partly helped by then Swindon manager Dennis Wise knowing Smith from his spell at Millwall when Wise was first team manager.

Smith was initially signed as backup to first choice goalkeeper Peter Brezovan and handed the #25 jersey for the 2006–07 season. After Brezovan suffered a broken arm in a home game against Grimsby Town on 14 October 2006, Smith took over in goal after an unsuccessful two game loan spell from Andrew Lonergan (loaned from Preston North End). He picked up the PFA Fans Player of the Month for December 2006. This award was presented to him on 27 January 2007, before the home game against Macclesfield Town, after a string of solid displays kept Swindon in the automatic promotion places. Smith was also rewarded for his efforts, with a two-year contract extension. His consistent displays between the sticks during the season did not go unnoticed by the fans, who named him Swindon's 'Fans Player of the Season' in May 2007.

In the following season, Smith granted his place as a first choice keeper and received the #1 jersey, where he continued to impress then manager Paul Sturrock. He performed well in the opening match of the 2007–08 season away to Northampton Town, where Swindon drew 1–1. He continued his outstanding performances, remaining first choice, keeping his first clean sheet of the season in the 5–0 thrashing of Gillingham at The County Ground. The arrival of Maurice Malpas as manager midway through the season saw the first choice goalkeeping position up for grabs, with neither Smith or other Swindon goalkeeper Peter Brezovan able to hold down the position on a regular basis.

Smith played 25 games in the 2008–09 season, in which Swindon were involved in a relegation battle for much of the campaign. During the pre-season of 2009/2010 season, new Swindon manager Danny Wilson brought in experienced goalkeeper David Lucas and handed him the #1 jersey. Smith was handed the #12 jersey. He did not feature on a regular basis, but when called upon, put in some good displays, including an outstanding game against Exeter City on 6 October 2009 in the Football League Trophy and a man of the match display in the League One Playoff Semi-Final Second Leg against Charlton Athletic, after David Lucas was forced off with injury after just 2 minutes. Swindon won the tie after a penalty shoot-out victory.

On 25 February 2010, Smith agreed a new contract extension with the club until the summer of 2012. He began the 2010–11 season as backup to David Lucas. However, injuries and a poor form from Lucas allowed Smith to make 27 appearances during the season. The season ultimately lead to a 24th-place finish and relegation to League Two.

Smith was second choice keeper after Wes Foderingham at Swindon in the 2011–12 season, after the arrival of Paolo Di Canio as new manager, but ahead of third choice Italian goalkeeper Mattia Lanzano.

On 18 May 2012, Smith was released by Swindon after over 6 years playing for the club. Until his departure, Smith was the longest serving player in the Swindon Town squad, having served the club from 2006 until 2012.

=== Portsmouth ===
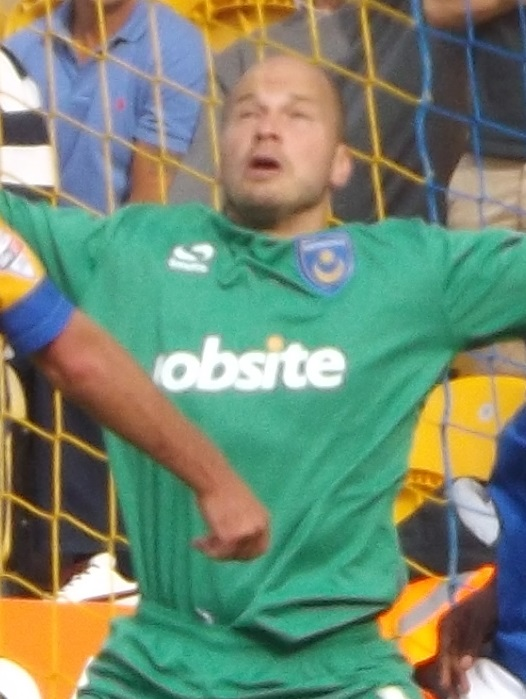
Smith playing for Portsmouth in 2013

On 7 December 2012, Smith signed a one-month contract with Portsmouth, initially as a backup for Simon Eastwood. Smith's first public game in a Portsmouth shirt came in a fundraising friendly at Fratton Park against ÍBV Vestmannaeyjar managed by former Portsmouth legend Hermann Hreidarsson. On 8 May 2013, he signed a one-year contract extension with Pompey.

Smith made his Pompey debut on 6 August, in a Football League Cup match against AFC Bournemouth. After an impressive performance he went on to play 3 league games, before making a mistake in a 2–2 draw away to Mansfield. He now plays in the Development Squad and is a second choice keeper behind Trevor Carson.

In November 2013, Smith joined Conference Premier side Dartford on a one-month loan deal.

He was released by Portsmouth at the end of the season.

=== Aldershot Town ===
Following his release by Portsmouth, Smith signed for Conference side Aldershot Town.

== Career statistics ==
As of match played 30 January 2016.

Appearances and goals by club, season and competition
Club	Season	League			FA Cup		League Cup		Other		Total	
Club	Season	Division	Apps	Goals	Apps	Goals	Apps	Goals	Apps	Goals	Apps	Goals
Millwall	1998–99	Second Division	5	0	0	0	0	0	0	0	5	0
Millwall	1999–2000	Second Division	0	0	0	0	0	0	0	0	0	0
Millwall	2000–01	Second Division	0	0	0	0	0	0	0	0	0	0
Millwall	Total		5	0	0	0	0	0	0	0	5	0
Folkestone Invicta	2001–02	Southern League Premier Division	1	0	—		—		—		1	0
Dover Athletic	2001–02	Football Conference	13	0	1	0	—		0	0	14	0
Margate	2002–03	Football Conference	22	0	0	0	—		2 (Note: Appearance(s) in FA Trophy)	0	24	0
Margate	2003–04	Football Conference	42	0	2	0	—		4	0	48	0
Margate	Total		64	0	2	0	—		6	0	72	0
Crawley Town	2004–05	Conference National	35	0	1	0	—		3	0	39	0
Crawley Town	2005–06	Conference National	38	0	0	0	—		4 (Note: One appearance in Football League Trophy, three in FA Trophy)	0	42	0
Crawley Town	Total		73	0	1	0	0	0	7	0	81	0
Swindon Town	2006–07	League Two	31	0	3	0	1	0	1 (Note: Appearance(s) in Football League Trophy)	0	36	0
Swindon Town	2007–08	League One	15	0	0	0	0	0	0	0	15	0
Swindon Town	2008–09	League One	25	0	1	0	0	0	2	0	28	0
Swindon Town	2009–10	League One	6	0	1	0	0	0	3 (Note: Two appearances in Football League Trophy, one in League One play-offs)	0	10	0
Swindon Town	2010–11	League One	27	0	3	0	1	0	1	0	32	0
Swindon Town	2011–12	League Two	8	0	0	0	2	0	1	0	11	0
Swindon Town	Total		112	0	8	0	4	0	8	0	132	0
Portsmouth	2012–13	League One	0	0	—		—		—		0	0
Portsmouth	2013–14	League Two	4	0	0	0	1	0	0	0	5	0
Portsmouth	Total		4	0	0	0	1	0	0	0	5	0
Dartford (loan)	2013–14	Conference Premier	3	0	—		—		2	0	5	0
Aldershot Town	2014–15	Conference Premier	45	0	5	0	—		1	0	51	0
Aldershot Town	2015–16	National League	28	0	3	0	—		1	0	32	0
Aldershot Town	Total		73	0	8	0	—		2	0	83	0
Career total			348	0	20	0	5	0	25	0	398	0

== Honours ==
Swindon Town

- Football League Trophy runner-up: 2011–12
