= Mehdi Kerrouche =

Algerian footballer (born 1985)

Personal information
- Full name: Mehdi Kerrouche
- Date of birth: 11 October 1985 (age 41)
- Place of birth: Douai, France
- Height: 1.80 m (5 ft 11 in)
- Position: Striker

Youth career
- –2001: RC Lens

Senior career*
Years	Team	Apps	(Gls)
2006–2007	AC Cambrai	18	(19)
2007	KSK Ronse	23	(11)
2007	USM Alger	15	(7)
2008–2009	GFCO Ajaccio	16	(8)
2009–2010	Naval	18	(5)
2010–2011	Al Urooba	18	(12)
2011–2012	Swindon Town	13	(6)
2012	→ Oxford United (loan)	4	(0)
2012–2013	CS Constantine	0	(0)
2013–2015	FC Les Lilas		
2015–2018	AO Episkopi	80	(48)
- * Club domestic league appearances and goals as of 00:00, 18 July 2018 (UTC)

Mehdi Kerrouche (born 11 October 1985) is a French footballer who plays as a striker.

== Club career ==
Born in Douai, France and of Algerian descent, Kerrouche started his senior career playing for AC Cambrai in the French CFA2. In 2007, he left the club to try his luck in the Belgian Second Division with K.S.K. Ronse.

=== USM Alger ===
On 18 August 2007, Kerrouche signed a one-year contract with Algerian club USM Alger.

=== GFCO Ajaccio ===
He played the 2008–09 season with GFCO Ajaccio in the French CFA. He made 18 appearances, scoring twelve goals.

=== Naval ===
In August 2009, Kerrouche signed with Associação Naval 1º de Maio. On 11 September 2009, he made his debut for the club as a starter in a league game against Vitória.

=== Swindon Town ===
On 18 July 2011, Kerrouche signed a two-year contract with English Football League Two side Swindon Town, subject to international clearance. It came after when the club offered a trial and quickly impressed manager Paulo Di Canio. He was also given a number 39 shirt by the club.

In Swindon Town's pre-season, Kerrouche scored once goals in the club's friendly match against Cirencester Town. However, he suffered a knee injury, causing him to miss the start of the 2011-12 season. On 16 August 2011, Kerrouche made his debut for Swindon Town, coming on as a 71st-minute substitute, in a 1-0 loss against Dagenham & Redbridge. Two weeks later, on 30 August 2011, he scored his first goal for the club, in a 3-1 loss against Southampton in the second round of the EFL Cup. Initially struggling to adapt at the club, he soon became a first team regular and formed a partnership with Alan Connell. In a match against Rotherham United, Kerrouche set up two goals for Swindon Town, in a 3-2 win. This followed up by scoring his first league goal in a 2–0 victory over Southend United and then scoring twice against Crawley Town in a 3–0 win three days later. After the match, he said his target was to help the club as his first priority and scoring goals as his second priority.

On 24 September 2011, Kerrouche scored his fourth goal for Swindon Town, in a 4-0 win against Barnet. On 8 October 2011, he scored again and set up the earlier goal for Raffaele De Vita, in a 3–3 draw against Hereford United. By October, Kerrouche was the club's top-scorer with five goals despite being absent on two separate occasions during the month. On 5 November 2011, Kerrouche scored his first penalty for Swindon Town in a 2–0 win over Port Vale. A week later, on 12 November 2011, he scored his first FA Cup goal, having come on as a substitute during a 4–1 defeat of Huddersfield Town of League One. However, Kerrouche suffered a groin injury that saw him out for two matches. On 3 December 2011, he made his return from injury, starting a match and played 26 minutes before being substituted, in a 1-0 win against Colchester United in the second round of the FA Cup. After the match, manager Di Canio said about substituting Kerrouche: "He was not happy but I was angrier than him. I can understand that what happened to Mehdi can happen with other players where they don't commit as much as they should, but I can't risk this because Swindon Town comes first. Sometimes you can be right and sometimes you can be wrong, but this time I was right. Mehdi can be angry but he knows I was angrier than him, but we put it behind us and from now we can work better because he is an important player and he has already proved this. A few months ago he was not good for a few games and he was not in a good moment, so I took him out of the side. He needs to find a way to have more anger and desire to make a difference on the field, when I see this I will then consider one of my best players for selection again."

Despite this, Kerrouche made another start for Swindon Town against Bristol Rovers on 10 December 2011 and played 51 minutes before being substituted, in a 1-1 draw, in what turned out to be his last appearance for the club. Following this, he was dropped from the first team squad, leading to his future at Swindon Town in doubt. In response, manager Di Canio said he would allow Kerrouche leave the club. Following his return from a loan spell at Oxford United, he remained out of the first team for the rest of the 2011-12 season. Despite this, his contributions at Swindon Town resulted in the club promoted to League One. At the end of the 2011-12 season, Kerrouche made eighteen appearances and scoring six times in all competitions.

On 25 June 2012, Kerrouche had his contract at Swindon Town cancelled by mutual consent.

==== Loan at Oxford United ====
On 9 February 2012, Kerrouche joined bitter local rivals Oxford United on a one-month loan. It came after when the club needed cover over striker crisis after losing strikers like Jon-Paul Pittman, Alfie Potter and Tom Craddock.

On 14 February 2012, he made his debut for Oxford United, coming on as a 79th-minute substitute, in a 2–1 win over Dagenham & Redbridge, giving the club their first win match in February. After making four appearances for the club, Kerrouche returned to Swindon after his loan spell with Oxford came to an end.

=== CS Constantine ===
Kerrouche returned to Algeria joining Ligue 1 side CS Constantine on a three-years deal.

== Personal life ==
Kerrouche has a daughter and dedicated his sucking his thumb celebration to his daughter.

== Honours ==
Swindon Town

- Football League Two: 2011–12
