= Chris Smith (footballer, born 1990) =

English footballer

Personal information
- Full name: Christopher Paul Smith
- Date of birth: 12 October 1990 (age 36)
- Place of birth: Stoke-on-Trent, England
- Position: Defender

Team information
- Current team: Chasetown

Youth career
- Everton
- Stoke City
- Kidsgrove Athletic

Senior career*
Years	Team	Apps	(Gls)
2009–2010	Alsager Town	40	
2010–2012	Stone Dominoes	55	(5)
2012–2013	Swindon Town	1	(0)
2012–2013	→ Northampton Town (loan)	0	(0)
2013–2014	Kidsgrove Athletic		
2014–	Chasetown		
- * Club domestic league appearances and goals as of 23:00, 28 March 2013 (UTC)

Christopher Smith (born 12 October 1990) is an English footballer who plays as a defender for Chasetown.

== Playing career ==
Smith, came up through the youth ranks at Everton before moving to Stoke City's youth system. Upon his release from Stoke City, Smith enrolled at the University of Staffordshire to study a degree in Sports Coaching and Development, sharing his studies with playing for Non-League side Stone Dominoes.

In June 2011, along with 5,000 hopefuls, Smith entered Samsung's Win A Pro Contract competition in a bid to earn a professional deal with Swindon Town. In February 2012, Smith was chosen by then Swindon manager Paolo Di Canio as the competition winner. Di Canio said of Smith, "he looked older than his age. As a right-back he has a fantastic quality. He's not very tall but when he challenges the opponent he has balance. Also, on the ball he is very good."

Smith made his League debut for Swindon in the 0–0 draw at Bradford City in May 2012. In November 2012, Smith joined Northampton Town on loan.

Following Swindon's decision to halve its wage bill over the summer of 2013, Smith was released by the club in May 2013, with Swindon manager Kevin MacDonald saying "the wage bill that was used this season was not sustainable so we have to reduce it. It's just a shame some good footballers have had to be released."

After leaving Swindon Smith returned to his native Stoke-on-Trent and signed for non-league Kidsgrove Athletic. He moved on to Chasetown in January 2014.
