= Alberto Comazzi =

Italian footballer (born 1979)

Personal information
- Date of birth: 16 April 1979 (age 47)
- Place of birth: Novara, Italy
- Height: 1.81 m (5 ft 11 in)
- Position: Defender

Youth career
- Milan

Senior career*
Years	Team	Apps	(Gls)
1996–1998	Milan	2	(0)
1998–2000	→ Como (loan)	59	(1)
2000–2001	Monza	29	(0)
2001–2002	Lazio	0	(0)
2002–2010	Verona	193	(3)
2008–2009	→ Ancona (loan)	30	(0)
2010–2011	Spezia	25	(2)
2011–2012	Swindon Town	4	(0)
Total		349	(6)
- * Club domestic league appearances and goals

Alberto Comazzi (born 16 April 1979) is an Italian former footballer who played as a defender.

== Career ==
=== Italy ===
He developed in the youth team of Milan, his Serie A debut in the Rossoneri shirt was when he was 18 was on 1 June 1997 in the defeat (1–0) for the Rossoneri at the San Siro against Cagliari.

In the 1998–99 season, he was loaned to Como in Serie C1. After some initial difficulties, he became more successful there and so did the rest of the team, they chased leaders Alzano virescit. After finishing second, the Larians were eliminated during the playoff semifinals against Pistoia. The following season finished with Lariana in tenth place.

In 2000–01 he went to Monza in Serie B, at that time there were frequent changes of coach. He was then bought by Lazio, although failed to make an appearance in Serie A.

He was then transferred to Verona, with whom he was a regular starter with. He spent five seasons with them in Serie B, the last of which in 2006–07, was when the La Scala were relegated to Serie C1. He then stayed in Verona in the season after competing in 25 games (with a goal scored).

In July 2008 he moved on loan to Ancona.

He signed an annual contract with Spezia, newly promoted to Lega Pro Prima Divisione on 8 July 2010.

=== England ===
It was confirmed in June 2011 that Swindon Town manager Paolo Di Canio was interested in signing Comazzi for the 2011–12 season. He officially signed for Swindon on 28 June. In January 2012 his contract with Swindon Town was terminated.

=== Italian football scandal ===
On 18 June 2012 Comazzi was suspended for 4 years due to 2011–12 Italian football scandal.
