= Ibrahim Atiku =

Ghanaian footballer (born 1986)

Personal information
- Full name: Ibrahim Mahama Atiku
- Date of birth: 20 May 1983 (age 43)
- Place of birth: Accra, Ghana
- Height: 1.78 m (5 ft 10 in)
- Position: Midfielder

Senior career*
Years	Team	Apps	(Gls)
2000–2003	Liberty Professionals	?	(?)
2001	→ Hapoel Petah Tikva (loan)	3	(1)
2003	Västerås	23	(3)
2004	Friska Viljor	29	(4)
2005–2008	Assyriska	48	(1)
2007	→ Sylvia (loan)	25	(1)
2009	Vasalund	21	(0)
2010	Ethnikos Piraeus	8	(0)
2011	Swindon Town	0	(0)

International career
1999	Ghana U17	6	(3)
- * Club domestic league appearances and goals

Ibrahim Mahama Atiku (born 20 May 1986) is a Ghanaian former professional footballer who played as a midfielder.

== Club career ==
Atiku was a member of a Ghana U17 squad that also featured Michael Essien, and after their performances at the 1999 FIFA U-17 World Championship, they went on trial with English club Manchester United in April 2000. Both players were offered contracts by the club, but they were unable to obtain work permits, and the move fell through.

Atiku ended up joining Liberty Professionals in 2000, and in 2001 he made his first transfer away from Ghana as he was taken on loan by Israeli club Hapoel Petah Tikva. until the end of that season and played one game in the UEFA Intertoto Cup with Hakoah Amidar Ramat Gan. His loan ended and returned to Liberty, but his performances had already attracted Swedish club Västerås which signed him in 2003. His next move was to Friska Viljor in 2005, and later played with Assyriska for first time in his career to Allsvenskan League, where he had two full seasons with 48 caps and was considered a key-member of the squad. In April 2007, Atiku decided to separate parts and signed a six-month loan deal with rivals Assyriska at Superettan club IF Sylvia.

It was reported that Botev Plovdiv were interested in signing him and that Cypriot club APEP had offered him a three-year deal contract that he refused in order to take a chance with Scottish Premier League side Inverness Caledonian Thistle. However, this move fell through and finally on 7 January 2009, Atiku joined Vasalund on a two-year contract.

Searching for a way to leave Sweden after many years of services, it was then that Greek historical club Ethnikos Piraeus signed Atiku on a two-year deal in order to help them win promotion to Super League Greece and went very close on this but financial problems bankrupted the club at the end of the season. Greek courts decided Ethnikos should pay €28,000 to Atiku due to his contract regulations but this decision failed to come through as the club went from professional to amateur and all its debts were erased.

On 28 June 2011, Atiku joined English club Swindon Town on trial. Following full preseason and played in all friendly games before the league season started, he signed a two-year contract with the club on 11 July 2011. Following his move, Atiku stated his intention to "grasp this chance and see where it takes to his next career" and was given the number 16 shirt for Swindon Town. However, his first team opportunities at the club quickly became limited after failing to break into the first team, due to strong competitions and appeared only for the reserve team. This led to manager Paulo Di Canio planning to loan him out to get first team experience, but he refused to join Newport Country on loan. On 28 October 2011, Swindon Town cancelled his contract at The County Ground by mutual consent, with Atiku making a statement that he has no regrets after his Swindon exit.

== International career ==
In 1999, Atiku represented the Ghana under-17 team at 1999 FIFA U-17 World Championship in New Zealand and later was part of the Ghana under-20 side at the 2001 FIFA World Youth Championship in Argentina. In 2010, Atiku participated in training with the Ghana senior team but eventually was not invited to play any official games. He was later called up to the squad to play Nigeria in August 2011, but the match was called off due to the rioting in England.

== Personal life ==
Atiku has held a Swedish passport since 13 May 2009.
