= Alessandro Cibocchi =

Italian footballer (born 1982)

Personal information
- Date of birth: 18 September 1982 (age 44)
- Place of birth: Terni, Italy
- Height: 1.81 m (5 ft 11 in)
- Position: Defender

Youth career
- Ternana

Senior career*
Years	Team	Apps	(Gls)
2001	Ternana	1	(0)
2002	Torino	0	(0)
2002	→ Viterbese (loan)	9	(0)
2003–2009	Ternana	27	(1)
2003–2004	→ Meda (loan)	24	(3)
2005	→ Potenza (loan)	5	(0)
2006–2007	→ Sassari Torres (loan)	15	(0)
2009–2010	Colligiana	22	(6)
2010	Deruta	6	(0)
2011	PortoSummaga	17	(0)
2011–2012	Swindon Town	18	(0)
2014	Civitanovese	–	(–)
2014–	A.C. Bastia 1924	–	(–)
- * Club domestic league appearances and goals as of 15:00, 26 April 2012 (UTC)

Alessandro Cibocchi (born 18 September 1982) is an Italian footballer who plays as a defender.

== Career ==
=== Early career ===
Born in Terni, Umbria, Cibocchi started his career at hometown club Ternana Calcio, which he made his league debut on 14 October 2001, as one of the starting XI. He was replaced by Cristian Lizzori in the 65th minute and the match Ternana losing to Ancona 0–1.

=== Torino & false accounting scandal ===
In January 2002, he swapped clubs with Torino Calcio's Emanuele Calaiò; the player exchange deal was later found to have inflated the price tag on both players, in order to increase the selling profit on the balance sheet. Despite it also creating another investment/cost on players and a counter-weight on the profit, it created an asset with higher nominal value than its fair value. The clubs were fined by Italian Football Federation (FIGC) 8 years later.

He was awarded no.26 shirt in 2001–02 Serie A but did not make any appearances for Torino.

Cibocchi was loaned to Viterbese in 2002–03 Serie C1 but the deal was cancelled in January 2003, and he returned to Ternana on loan.

=== Return to Ternana ===
In July 2003, he returned to Ternana on a permanent deal as the club exchanged him with Calaiò for a second time; he also signed a length deal partially to amortise his nominal price tag in years. He then left on loan to Meda of Serie C2 for that season. With the Lombard club, he played a career high with 24 league games in a single season.

After only playing 3 times in the first half of 2004–05 Serie B, he left for Serie C2 club Potenza. In the next season, he only played once in Serie B. Cibocchi returned to Serie C2 again in 2006–07 season. After Ternana were relegated to Serie C1 in 2007, he returned to his mother club and signed a new 3-year contract. He played 23 Prima Divisione/Serie C1 matches for Ternana after his return.

=== From Lega Pro to Serie B ===
In August 2009 he left for Lega Pro Seconda Divisione club Colligiana. The team finished as the 17th and went bankrupt after the season. After failed to find a club in summer transfer window, he left for Serie D (top division of regional/amateur/non-professional leagues) side Deruta. However, he was signed by Serie B side PortoSummaga in December 2010 (paperwork completed on 7 January 2011). The club at that time was the 21st with 18 points (round 20) and far away to escape from relegation zone. He made his debut on 8 January 2011, the first game after the winter break, replacing another new signing Ivan Franceschini at half time. That match PortoSummaga losing to Crotone 0–2.

=== Swindon Town ===
On 19 July 2011, Cibocchi moved to England by joining League Two side Swindon Town under Paolo Di Canio on a free transfer. It came after when he went on trial with the club and played in a friendly match. Upon joining Swindon Town, Cibocchi was given a number twenty-seven shirt.

However, his debut for Swindon Town was delayed due to lack of international clearance from the Italian Football Federation, as well as, suffering from ankle injury. On 3 September 2011, he made his debut for the club, coming on as a 75th-minute substitute, in a 3-2 win against Rotherham United. After missing one match due to an injury, Cibocchi returned to the starting line-up, coming on as a 57th-minute substitute, in a 3-0 win against Crawley Town on 13 September 2011. His return was short-lived when he missed two matches due to fitness concern.

On 3 October 2011, Cibocchi returned from his fitness concern, starting a match for the first time and played 75 minutes before being substituted, in a 2-1 win against Exeter City in the second round of the Football League Trophy. His return was short-lived once again when he suffered a knock that kept him out for two matches. On 26 November 2011, Cibocchi made his return from a knock, coming on as a 73rd-minute substitute, in a 2-0 win against Aldershot Town. Following his return from injury, he alternated between the starting line-up and substitute bench. In the Football League Trophy final, Cibocchi came on as a 77th-minute substitute, as Swindon Town loss 2-0 against Chestefield. Following this, he never made another appearance for the club again. Despite this, his contributions at Swindon Town resulted in the club promoted to League One. At the end of the 2011-12 season, Cibocchi made twenty-six appearances in all competitions.

Cibocchi terminated his contract by mutual consent for personal reasons on 22 August 2012. During his time at Swindon Town, he became something of a fan favourite in large part due to his social media presence and the popularised chant 'Dance with Cibocchi'.

== Honours ==
Swindon Town

- Football League Two: 2011–12
- Football League Trophy runner-up: 2011–12
