= Sean Morrison (footballer) =

English footballer (born 1991)

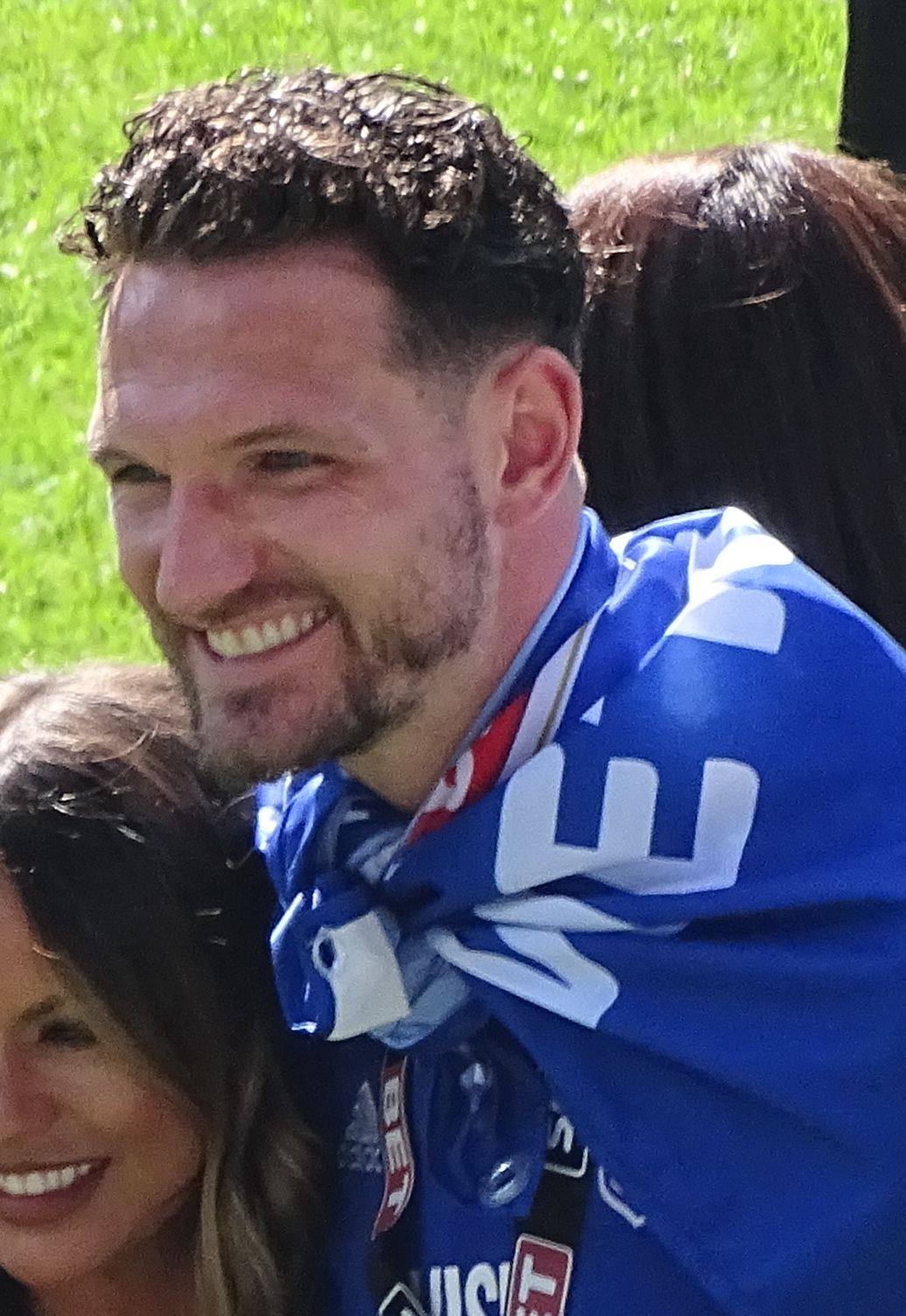
- Morrison celebrating winning promotion with Cardiff City in 2018

Personal information
- Full name: Sean Joseph Morrison
- Date of birth: 8 January 1991 (age 35)
- Place of birth: Plymouth, England
- Height: 6 ft 4 in (1.93 m)
- Position: Centre back

Youth career
- 2006–2007: Plymouth Argyle
- 2007–2008: Swindon Town

Senior career*
Years	Team	Apps	(Gls)
2008–2011	Swindon Town	50	(6)
2009–2010	→ Southend United (loan)	8	(0)
2011–2014	Reading	38	(4)
2011	→ Huddersfield Town (loan)	0	(0)
2012	→ Huddersfield Town (loan)	19	(1)
2014–2023	Cardiff City	278	(33)
2023–2024	Rotherham United	29	(1)
- * Club domestic league appearances and goals as of 3 July 2024 (UTC)

Sean Joseph Morrison (born 8 January 1991) is an English professional footballer who plays as a centre back.

He began his career as a youth player with Plymouth Argyle but was released in 2007, joining Swindon Town where he made his professional debut. He went on to make 50 appearances in the Football League for Swindon, spending time on loan with Southend United. In 2011, he signed for Championship side Reading, and had two spells on loan with Huddersfield Town during which he helped the club secure promotion to the Championship after winning the 2012 Football League One play-off final.

After returning to Reading, he made his Premier League debut for the side before being relegated at the end of the season. He made more than 40 appearances for the club before signing for Cardiff City in 2014. Morrison was appointed captain of Cardiff in September 2016 and helped the club win promotion to the Premier League in the following campaign after finishing as runners-up in the Championship during the 2017–18 season. After leaving Cardiff in January 2023, he signed for Rotherham United later that month.

== Club career ==
=== Swindon Town ===
Born in Plymouth, Devon, Morrison was a keen sportsman as a teenager, playing football and competing in athletics events. He favoured the long jump and represented his county and the South-West England team in the event. At the age of fourteen, he gave up athletics due to the travelling involved and to focus on his football career. Morrison joined his hometown club Plymouth Argyle in 2006, playing in the club's youth system for a year. However, he was released by Plymouth at the age of sixteen after being told by coaches that he "didn't use (his) size well enough." He subsequently joined Swindon Town in the summer of 2007, after being spotted by youth team manager Paul Bodin, signing an 18-month professional contract in February 2008, before being promoted to the first team in March 2008. Swindon manager Maurice Malpas commented that he would like to see Morrison and fellow youth player Ben Joyce gain first team experience, and Morrison made his professional debut on 26 April 2008 against Gillingham at the age of seventeen, coming on as a first-half substitute for Jerel Ifil during a 1–1 draw. He made his first start for Swindon on the final day of the season, 3 May 2008, in a 2–1 victory over Millwall.

The following season, Morrison featured more frequently in the first team, making 23 appearances in all competitions and scored his first goal for the club on 25 October 2008, in a 2–0 league victory against Oldham Athletic. His performances led to several requests from Premier League sides to take Morrison on trial, which were rejected by Swindon, with new Swindon manager Danny Wilson describing him as "the future of the club." Morrison also won the club's Young Player of the Year award. In May 2009, Scottish side Celtic saw a joint bid of £1.2 million for Morrison and teammate Simon Cox rejected.

Having struggled to break into the first team at the start of the 2009–10 season, with Gordon Greer and Scott Cuthbert being preferred, Morrison signed a one-month loan deal with Southend United on 14 November 2009. He made his debut for Southend in a 1–0 defeat against Yeovil Town, being sent off for the first time in his career after 34 minutes for a professional foul. The loan deal was extended in December. Southend hoped to extend his loan in January 2010, although he eventually returned to Swindon later that same month after being recalled. Southend manager Steve Tilson later expressed his frustration over the decision, stating that "I'm not going to hide the fact that we're very disappointed." During his loan spell, Morrison appeared eight times for Southend but made only four further appearances for Swindon during the remainder of the season.

At the start of the 2010–11 season, Morrison was restored to the first team at Swindon with manager Danny Wilson praising Morrison's maturity at the start of the campaign. Having displaced Lecsinel Jean-François in defence, Morrison scored five times in the first half of the season, including a goal against his former club Plymouth in the FA Cup.

=== Reading ===
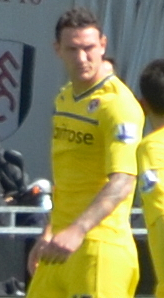
Morrison playing for Reading in 2013

On 14 January 2011, Swindon Town and Reading reached an agreement to transfer Morrison after a release clause in the player's contract was activated, with the deal completing four days later. Although the fee was officially undisclosed, it was reported to be between £250,000 and £300,000. Having failed to make an appearance for the club since signing, on 23 March 2011, he joined Huddersfield Town on loan until the end of the season, with Reading retaining 24-hour recall after the first month. Huddersfield had shown an interest in signing Morrison before his move to Reading, with the player favouring a move to his parent club. Signed as cover for the central defensive partnership of Peter Clarke and Jamie McCombe, Morrison was an unused substitute in four matches for Huddersfield but, after failing to make an appearance while on loan, Reading recalled Morrison from Huddersfield on 19 April. Despite never playing for the club, Huddersfield manager Lee Clark commented that he was "gutted" to lose Morrison, describing him as "a very good footballer and has shown a terrific attitude all the time." He made his Reading debut in a 2–1 defeat against Charlton Athletic in the second round of the League Cup on 23 August 2011, scoring a consolation goal in his first appearance for the club.

==== Huddersfield Town (loan) ====
On 24 January 2012, Morrison re-joined Huddersfield Town on loan until the end of the season. He made his debut four days later in their 1–1 draw against Tranmere Rovers at Prenton Park and scored his first goal for the club in a 3–3 draw away to Bury on 3 March. Morrison made 19 appearances during the regular league season, helping Huddersfield finish in fourth place and qualify for the play-offs. He played in both legs of the club's 3–2 semifinal aggregate victory over Milton Keynes Dons and scored in the play-off final penalty shoot-out against Sheffield United, which Huddersfield won, promoting them to the Championship. With parent club Reading having been promoted to the Premier League, Morrison stated that he would be open to a permanent move to Huddersfield.

==== First team ====
After returning to Reading, Morrison's first appearance in the 2012–13 season came in a 3–2 League Cup victory over Queens Park Rangers (QPR) on 26 September where he came on as a second-half substitute. He then started against Arsenal in the next round on 30 October in a game which Reading lost 7–5. On 2 October, he signed a new four-year deal with Reading. He made his Premier League debut against QPR on 4 November 2012, helping the side record their first clean sheet of the season in their following match, a 0–0 draw with Norwich City. He scored his first league goal against Wigan Athletic two weeks later. After dropping out of the side midway through the season, Morrison finished the campaign in a defensive partnership alongside Adrian Mariappa under new manager Nigel Adkins. He finished the campaign with sixteen appearances in the Premier League as Reading suffered relegation back to the Championship after a single season.

In August 2013, Morrison was handed the Reading captaincy in the absence of regular captain Jobi McAnuff. He described the event as "an honour". On 10 December 2013, Morrison extended his contract with Reading until the summer of 2017. In November 2014, Morrison suffered a serious knee injury after damaging ligaments during a 1–1 draw with Queens Park Rangers. The injury kept him out for five months, making his return in a 1–1 draw with former club Huddersfield Town. He finished the season with 21 league appearances as Reading missed out on a play-off place on the final day of the season.

=== Cardiff City ===
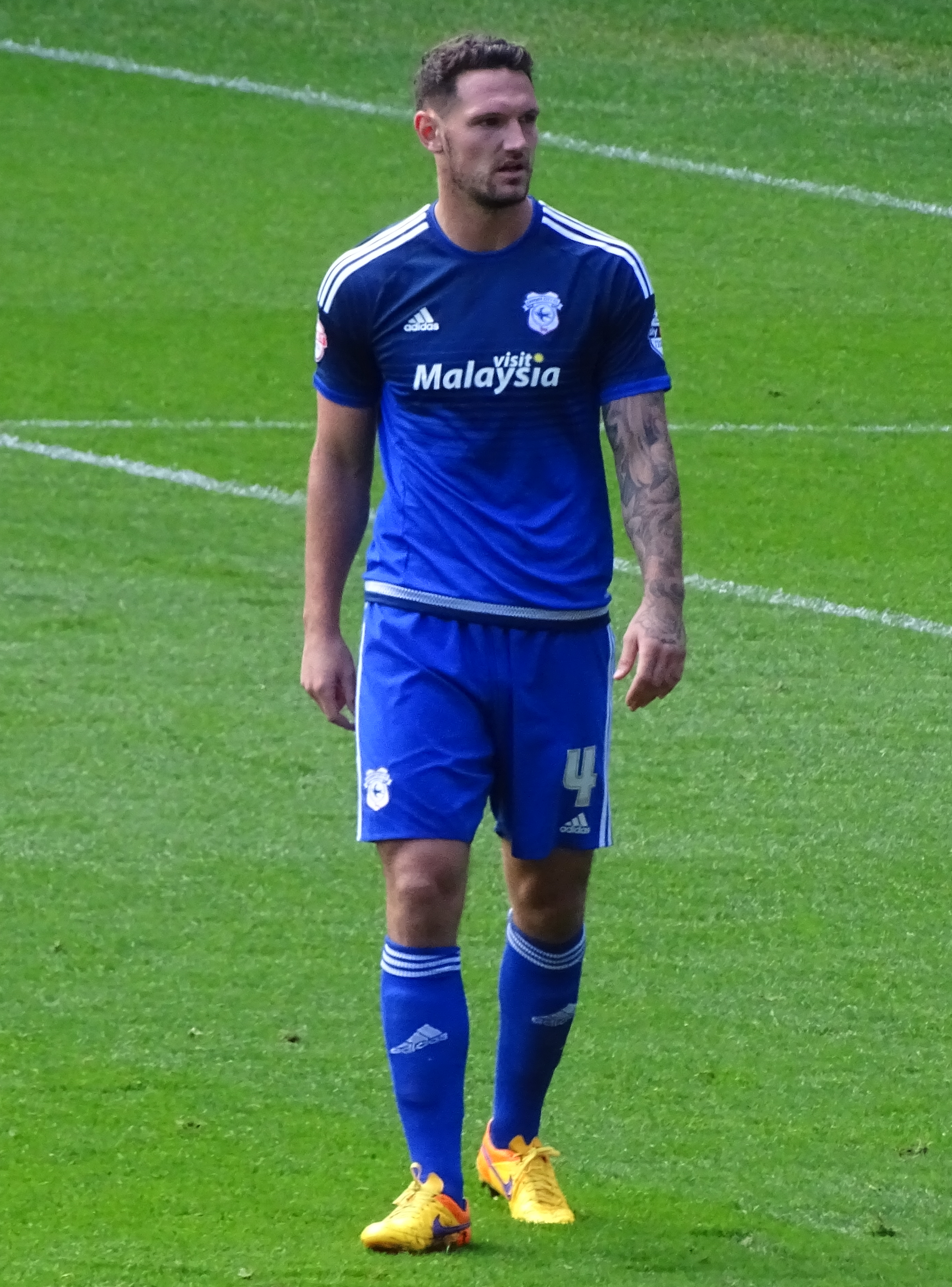
Morrison playing for Cardiff City in 2015

On 15 August 2014, Morrison signed a four-year contract with fellow Championship side Cardiff City for an initial fee of £3 million, with further add-ons based on appearances and future promotions. He made his debut for Cardiff four days later in a 1–0 victory against Wigan Athletic. Morrison opened his account for Cardiff scoring the opener in a 2–1 win over Sheffield Wednesday before scoring a brace against AFC Bournemouth.

Morrison was handed the captain's armband at the start of the following season, in the absence of club captain, David Marshall. Morrison was ever-present in Cardiff's starting eleven before suffering a knee injury during a 1–0 loss to Birmingham City on 19 December 2015, which was initially expected to rule him out for a month. However, his return was delayed until 5 March 2016, when he came on in place of Lee Peltier in a 2–0 win against Severnside rivals Bristol City. Morrison saw Cardiff miss out on a play-off place after losing to Sheffield Wednesday, before receiving an operation, meaning he would miss the final game of the season and potentially the start of the next season. Morrison returned in time for the new season and was named as captain in Cardiff's 1–0 loss to Bristol Rovers in the EFL Cup. In September, he was named as permanent club captain by manager Paul Trollope, following the sale of David Marshall. Morrison made a career-high 46 appearances, scoring four goals during the season.

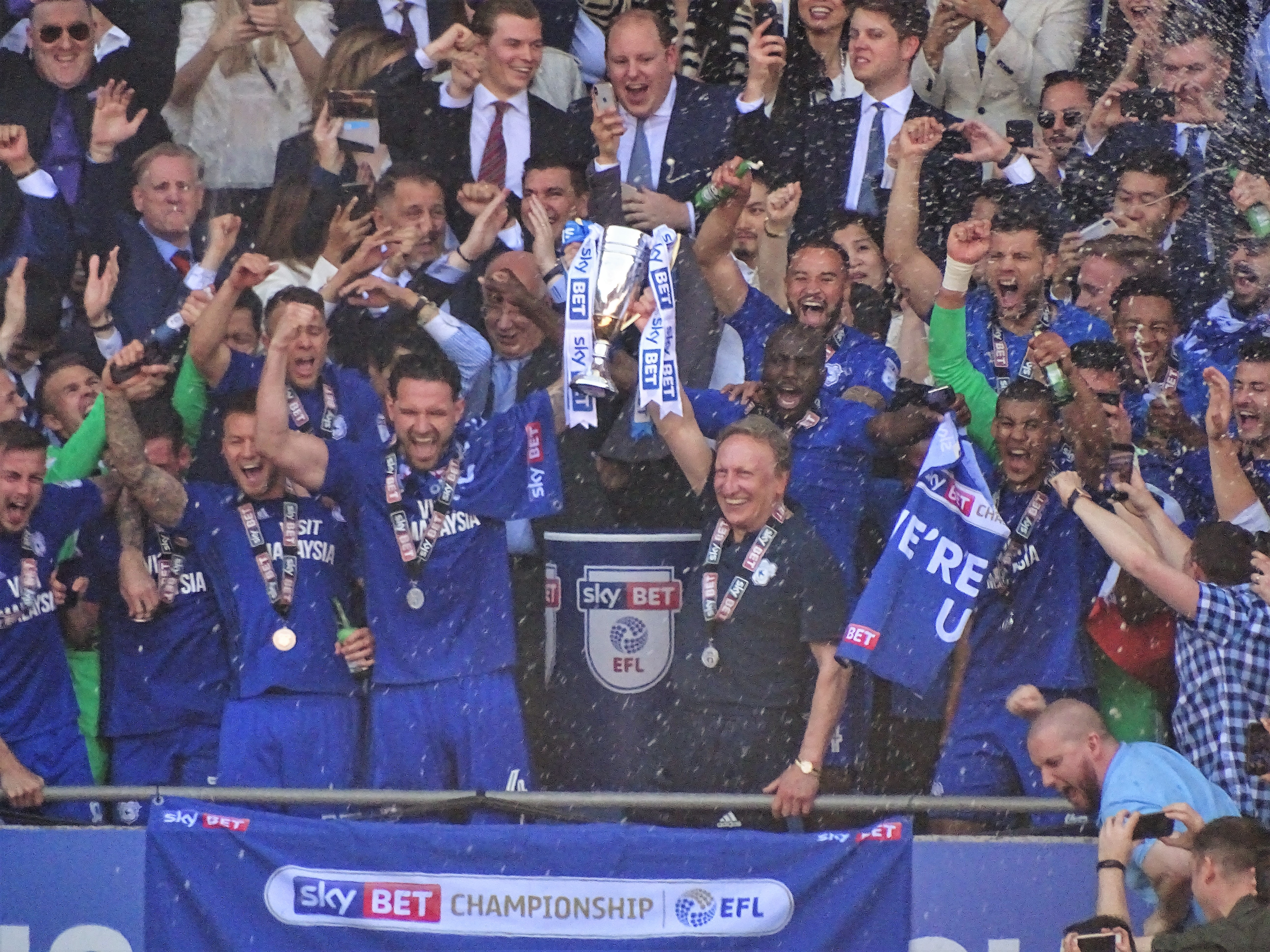
Morrison (holding trophy left) lifts the 2017–18 EFL Championship runner-up trophy with manager Neil Warnock.

During summer 2017, fellow Championship club, Sheffield Wednesday, submitted a £3 million bid for Morrison, which manager Neil Warnock stated "wouldn't even buy one of Morrisons legs", and an improved £5 million bid. Morrison later stated that he had no intention of leaving the club and committed to Cardiff, signing a three-year contract. His first goal of the season, against Sheffield United, led Cardiff to win their three opening games of the season, for the first time in their history. In February, Morrison scored three goals in five games, as well as helping his side record three clean sheets, which led to him being nominated for EFL Championship Player of the Month. Morrison was named Cardiff City Player of the Year as he captained the side to second place in the Championship, winning promotion to the Premier League. During the season, he made 43 appearances in all competitions, scoring a career-high seven goals, and his defensive partnership with Sol Bamba conceded jointly the fewest goals in the league and recorded 19 clean sheets.

Morrison suffered a broken nose during a 2–1 victory over Brighton & Hove Albion in November 2018 but rejected the chance to have surgery to rectify the injury, instead choosing to postpone the operation in order to keep playing. In January 2019, Morrison was admitted to hospital and underwent emergency surgery to remove a burst appendix. He had been suffering from severe pain in his abdomen and was instructed to go to hospital by Cardiff City club doctor Len Noakes who had been contacted by Morrison's wife after Morrison had refused to seek treatment. It was reported that Morrison was told that he had been "45 minutes from death." Prior to his operation, he had been ever-present in the Premier League for Cardiff, having started all 22 matches to that point. He remained sidelined for six weeks, before making his return in a 5–1 defeat to Watford on 22 February, and finished the season with 35 appearances in all competitions as Cardiff suffered relegation to the Championship.

Upon their return to the Championship, Morrison captained Cardiff to a 5th-placed finish before losing to Fulham in the playoff semi final. In February 2022 he was injured, ruling him out for the season, with the club directors to meet to discuss his future. By July 2022 his contract had expired, and he was undergoing rehabilitation for his injury. Having recovered from his injury, Morrison departed the club in January 2023.

=== Rotherham United ===
On 10 January 2023, he signed for Championship club Rotherham United on a short-term deal until the end of the season. He was released by the club at the end of the 2023–24 season.

== International career ==
At international level, Morrison is eligible to represent both England and the Republic of Ireland, qualifying to represent the nation as two of his grandparents are Irish.

== Style of play ==
Morrison is regarded as a big, physical centre-back who is noted for his aerial ability. He is also known for his tenacity, with Paul Abbandonato of WalesOnline describing him as "courageous, strong-willed, committed to the cause, passionate" and "Not the most aesthetic of footballers, no frills but talk about guts." He also possesses a long throw-in ability, which Huddersfield manager Lee Clark described as "a valuable attacking asset" during his time with the club. He has described himself as "a commanding centre-half who loves aerial battles and one-to-one duels. I don't shy away from the ugly stuff, but I also like to pass and play when the time is right."

== Career statistics ==
Appearances and goals by club, season and competition
Club	Season	League			FA Cup		League Cup		Other		Total	
Club	Season	Division	Apps	Goals	Apps	Goals	Apps	Goals	Apps	Goals	Apps	Goals
Swindon Town	2007–08	League One	2	0	0	0	0	0	0	0	2	0
Swindon Town	2008–09	League One	20	1	0	0	1	0	2 (Note: Appearance(s) in Football League Trophy)	0	23	1
Swindon Town	2009–10	League One	9	1	0	0	1	0	0	0	10	1
Swindon Town	2010–11	League One	19	4	3	1	0	0	3	0	25	5
Swindon Town	Total		50	6	3	1	2	0	5	0	60	7
Southend United (loan)	2009–10	League One	8	0	—		—		—		8	0
Reading	2010–11	Championship	0	0	0	0	—		0	0	0	0
Reading	2011–12	Championship	0	0	0	0	1	1	—		1	1
Reading	2012–13	Premier League	16	2	3	0	2	0	—		21	2
Reading	2013–14	Championship	21	1	0	0	0	0	—		21	1
Reading	2014–15	Championship	1	1	—		1	0	—		2	1
Reading	Total		37	4	3	0	4	1	0	0	44	5
Huddersfield Town (loan)	2010–11	League One	0	0	—		—		0	0	0	0
Huddersfield Town (loan)	2011–12	League One	19	1	—		—		3 (Note: Appearance(s) in League One play-offs)	0	22	1
Cardiff City	2014–15	Championship	41	6	1	0	0	0	—		42	6
Cardiff City	2015–16	Championship	30	3	0	0	2	0	—		32	3
Cardiff City	2016–17	Championship	44	4	1	0	1	0	—		46	4
Cardiff City	2017–18	Championship	39	7	3	0	1	0	—		43	7
Cardiff City	2018–19	Premier League	34	1	1	0	0	0	—		35	1
Cardiff City	2019–20	Championship	36	4	1	0	0	0	2 (Note: Appearance(s) in Championship play-offs)	0	39	4
Cardiff City	2020–21	Championship	38	5	0	0	1	0	0	0	39	5
Cardiff City	2021–22	Championship	16	3	1	0	2	0	—		19	3
Cardiff City	2022–23	Championship	0	0	0	0	0	0	—		0	0
Cardiff City	Total		278	33	8	0	7	0	2	0	295	33
Rotherham United	2022–23	Championship	2	0	—		—		—		2	0
Rotherham United	2023–24	Championship	27	1	1	0	2	1	—		30	2
Rotherham United	Total		29	1	1	0	2	1	0	0	32	2
Career total			421	44	15	1	15	2	10	0	461	47

== Honours ==
Huddersfield Town

- Football League One play-offs: 2012

Cardiff City

- EFL Championship second-place promotion: 2017–18

Individual

- Swindon Town Young Player of the Year: 2008–09
- Cardiff City Player of the Year: 2017–18
- EFL Championship Team of the Season: 2020–21
