= Jon-Paul McGovern =

Scottish footballer and coach

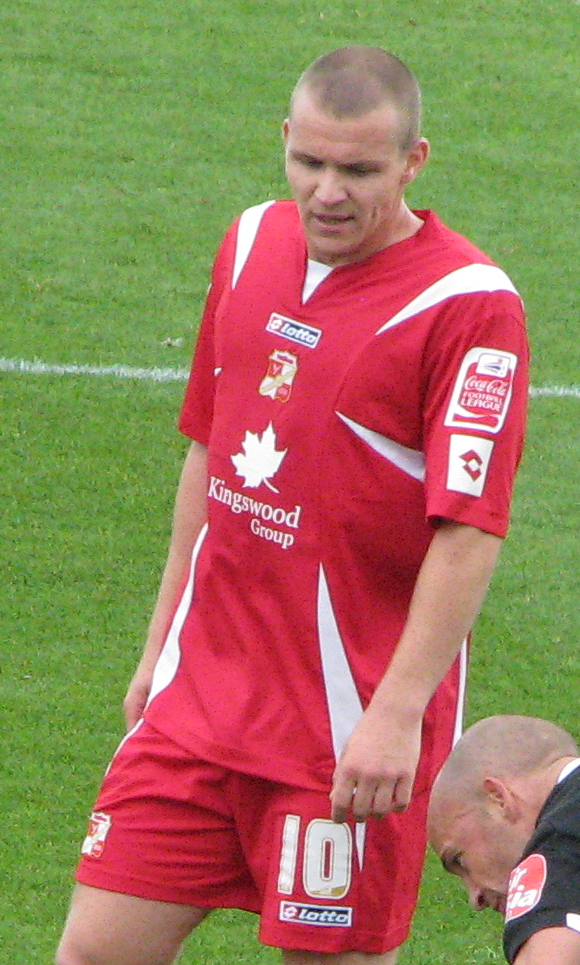
- McGovern playing for Swindon Town in 2007

Personal information
- Full name: Jon-Paul McGovern
- Date of birth: 3 October 1980 (age 46)
- Place of birth: Glasgow, Scotland
- Height: 5 ft 7 in (1.70 m)
- Position: Midfielder

Senior career*
Years	Team	Apps	(Gls)
2000–2003	Celtic	0	(0)
2002–2003	→ Sheffield United (loan)	15	(1)
2003–2004	Livingston	27	(0)
2004–2006	Sheffield Wednesday	56	(8)
2006–2007	Milton Keynes Dons	47	(3)
2007–2011	Swindon Town	153	(8)
2011–2013	Carlisle United	83	(4)
2013–2014	Celtic Nation	1	(0)
2014	Derry City	2	(0)
2014–2015	Ayr United	36	(5)
2015	Stirling Albion	2	(0)
2015–2017	Clyde	33	(1)
2017–2019	Elgin City	69	(1)
Total		524	(31)

International career
2003	Scotland B	1	(0)
- * Club domestic league appearances and goals

Jon-Paul McGovern (born 3 October 1980) is a Scottish former football player and coach.

== Career ==
Born in Glasgow, McGovern started his football career at Celtic having signed at the age of 16. His time playing in Scotland was sandwiched by a loan spell at Sheffield United. Whilst on loan at Sheffield United he scored three times; the first goals of his professional career. He scored in the league against Walsall, before following that up with strikes against York City in the League Cup and Cheltenham in the FA Cup. After returning to Celtic when his loan spell ended with Sheffield United and Celtic refusing to extend his stay at Sheffield United, he finished out his season in the reserves with Celtic.

In the summer transfer window, he signed with Livingston at the end of that season although he still had one year left on his contract at Celtic. At Livingston, McGovern failed to score a single goal, but he did contribute to their victorious 2003–04 Scottish League Cup campaign, including coming on as a late substitute as they beat Hibernian in the 2004 Scottish League Cup Final. He joined Sheffield Wednesday in 2004. He was a key part of the Owls' play-off winning side in 2005, scoring a goal in the semi-final against Brentford and a goal in the final against Hartlepool. He was an ever-present in that season and became a fan favourite amongst the Owls supporters. During the 2005/06 season though, his appearances were limited due to an injury. At the end of the season he was released, and subsequently signed for Milton Keynes Dons.

=== Swindon Town ===
After one full season with Milton Keynes, McGovern was signed by Swindon Town for an undisclosed fee – McGovern was reunited with Paul Sturrock, whom he played under at Sheffield Wednesday and has signed a contract until 2010. McGovern made a tribute to his MK Dons career, scoring a free-kick on his final appearance for the club in the Football League Cup second round against former rivals Sheffield United.

McGovern made his debut, coming on as a substitute, in the 57th minute, as Swindon Town lost 1–0 against Yeovil Town and scored his first goal, in the next game, on 15 September 2007, in a 1–1 draw against Hartlepool United. Two month later, into joining the club, Sturrock, the manager who signed McGovern, resigned to join Plymouth Argyle. At Swindon Town, McGovern established himself in the first team and made forty-one appearances, as Swindon finished their first season back in League One in 13th.

In the 2008–09 season campaign, McGovern was given the number ten shirt. McGovern scored his first goal in the opening game of the season, in a 3–1 win over Tranmere Rovers. But soon, under manager Maurice Malpas, McGovern featured on the substitute bench, although he regained his first team place. From February, under new manager Danny Wilson, McGovern was dropped from the squad in favour of other midfielders and has been on the sideline since. His drop from the first team led McGovern to consider leaving the club if he didn't get enough playing time. McGovern made twenty-six appearances, as the club survived the relegation.

In the 2009–10 campaign, McGovern was a near every-present for the Robins under Danny Wilson, with forty-five appearances and has since regained his first team place. McGovern was also the club's top assist of the season, with sixteen, and scored once, in a 2–2 draw against Oldham on 22 August 2009. During the season, McGovern had his number shirt switched from ten to seven after Michael Timlin took over his number ten shirt. In January 2010, McGovern was linked with a £750,000 move to Gus Poyet's Brighton & Hove Albion. The next month, McGovern was offered a new contract. A few weeks later, McGovern signed a two-year contract with the club. Later in the 2009–10 season, McGovern helped the club through to the 2009–10 play-off final and was awarded Swindon Away Supporters' (SAS) Player of the Year.

In the 2010–11 season campaign, McGovern continued to feature in the first team and scored his first goal of the season, in a 2–1 loss against Leyton Orient in the first round of the League Cup and then scored his first league goal in a 3–3 draw against Yeovil Town after coming on as a substitute. McGovern scored and set up the first goal, in a 2–1 win over Sheffield Wednesday and scored, again, in the second-round replay, in a 3–2 loss against Crawley Town. Later in the 2010–11 season, the club suffered a setback after a poor run of form that had seen the club slip into the relegation zone and led to the club's fate to League Two. In his total appearance at Swindon Town, McGovern made 153 and scored eight times.

=== Carlisle United ===
On 20 June 2011 it was confirmed that McGovern had signed a 2-year deal with Carlisle United keeping him with the club until July 2013. McGovern was expecting to make a return to Sheffield United, making a reunite with Manager Wilson.

In 2011–12 season, McGovern has been a near every-present for the Cumbrians under Manager Greg Abbott and made his debut, in the opening game of the season, in a 3–0 loss against Notts County and scored his first goal, three days later, in the first round of the League Cup, in a 1–1 win over Oldham, which resulted going on penalties shoot-out, but won 4–2 in the shoot-out, which he converted the first penalty. On 15 October 2011, McGovern scored his first league goal, in a 3–0 win over Yeovil Town. On 2 January 2012, McGovern scored the winner and set up the club's first goal of 2012, in a 3–2 win against his former club, Sheffield United. His next goal was followed up on 6 March 2012, in a 2–1 win over Rochdale.

In 2012–13 season, McGovern was linked with a move to Rotherham United after the club was believed to sign him. But this was denied McGovern, himself, stating he's to stay at the club for next season and confirmed that he's attracted interests from other clubs. McGovern would make thirty-eight appearances, having established himself in the right-midfield or wing. At the end of the season, McGovern was released by the club, along with seven other players. Following his release, McGovern attracted interests from clubs to seek a new challenge. On the other hand, McGovern expressed desire to resume his career in Scotland after a nine-year exile, playing in England. McGovern now owns and runs a tea shop in Scotland after failing to secure a contract for the 2013–14 football season.

=== Celtic Nation & Derry City ===
McGovern signed for Northern League Division One side Celtic Nation until the end of the 2013/14 season.

On 7 March 2014, McGovern joined League of Ireland club Derry City for the 2014 season.

=== Return to Scotland ===
In early July 2014, McGovern signed with Scottish League One side, Ayr United. After just one season with The Honest Men, McGovern chose to leave Ayr.

On 2 September 2015, it was announced that McGovern had signed for Scottish League Two side, Clyde following a short spell with Stirling Albion. During his first season at Clyde, McGovern made a positive impact as the club finished the season in the Scottish League Two play-offs. However, McGovern's own season ended early after picking up a knee injury in a 3–0 defeat to Berwick Rangers that ruled him out of action for an extended period.

McGovern returned to action the following season making a substitute appearance against his former team Ayr United in the Scottish Cup. On 2 March 2017, McGovern was announced as co-interim player-manager of Clyde alongside teammate Peter MacDonald. They held this position until the end of the season, when Clyde advertised for a new first team manager. After Jim Chapman was appointed manager in May 2017, McGovern was released by the club.

McGovern subsequently signed for fellow League Two club Elgin City in June 2017. In April 2019, McGovern announced his retirement from professional football.

== Career statistics ==
As of 15 August 2019

Club	Season	League			FA Cup		League Cup		Other		Total	
Club	Season	Division	Apps	Goals	Apps	Goals	Apps	Goals	Apps	Goals	Apps	Goals
Celtic	2002–03	Scottish Premier League	0	0	0	0	0	0	0	0	0	0
Sheffield United (loan)	2002–03	Football League First Division	15	1	1	1	2	1	0	0	18	3
Livingston	2003–04	Scottish Premier League	27	0	2	0	3	0	0	0	32	0
Sheffield Wednesday	2004–05	League One	49	8	1	0	2	0	1	0	53	8
Sheffield Wednesday	2005–06	Championship	7	0	0	0	1	0	0	0	8	0
Sheffield Wednesday	Total		56	8	1	0	3	0	1	0	61	8
Milton Keynes Dons	2006–07	League Two	45	3	3	0	3	0	1	0	52	3
Milton Keynes Dons	2007–08	League Two	3	0	0	0	2	1	0	0	5	1
Milton Keynes Dons	Total		48	3	3	0	5	1	1	0	57	4
Swindon Town	2007–08	League One	41	2	3	1	0	0	2	0	46	3
Swindon Town	2008–09	League One	26	2	1	0	1	0	3	0	31	2
Swindon Town	2009–10	League One	48	1	3	0	2	1	2	0	55	2
Swindon Town	2010–11	League One	38	3	3	1	1	1	3	0	45	5
Swindon Town	Total		153	8	10	2	4	2	10	0	177	12
Carlisle United	2011–12	League One	45	3	2	0	2	1	1	1	50	5
Carlisle United	2012–13	League One	38	1	3	0	2	0	1	1	44	2
Carlisle United	Total		83	4	5	0	4	1	2	2	94	7
Ayr United	2014–15	Scottish League One	36	5	2	0	2	0	1	0	41	5
Stirling Albion	2015–16	Scottish League Two	2	0	0	0	1	0	1	0	4	0
Clyde	2015–16	Scottish League Two	33	1	2	0	0	0	0	0	35	1
Clyde	2016–17	Scottish League Two	5	0	1	0	0	0	0	0	6	0
Clyde	Total		38	1	3	0	0	0	0	0	41	1
Elgin City	2017–18	Scottish League Two	36	0	2	0	4	0	3	0	45	0
Elgin City	2018–19	Scottish League Two	33	1	2	0	2	0	1	0	38	1
Elgin City	Total		69	1	4	0	6	0	4	0	83	1
Career total			527	31	31	3	30	5	20	2	608	41

== Honours ==
Livingston

- Scottish League Cup: 2003–04

Sheffield Wednesday

- Football League One play-offs: 2005
