= Callum Kennedy =

English footballer

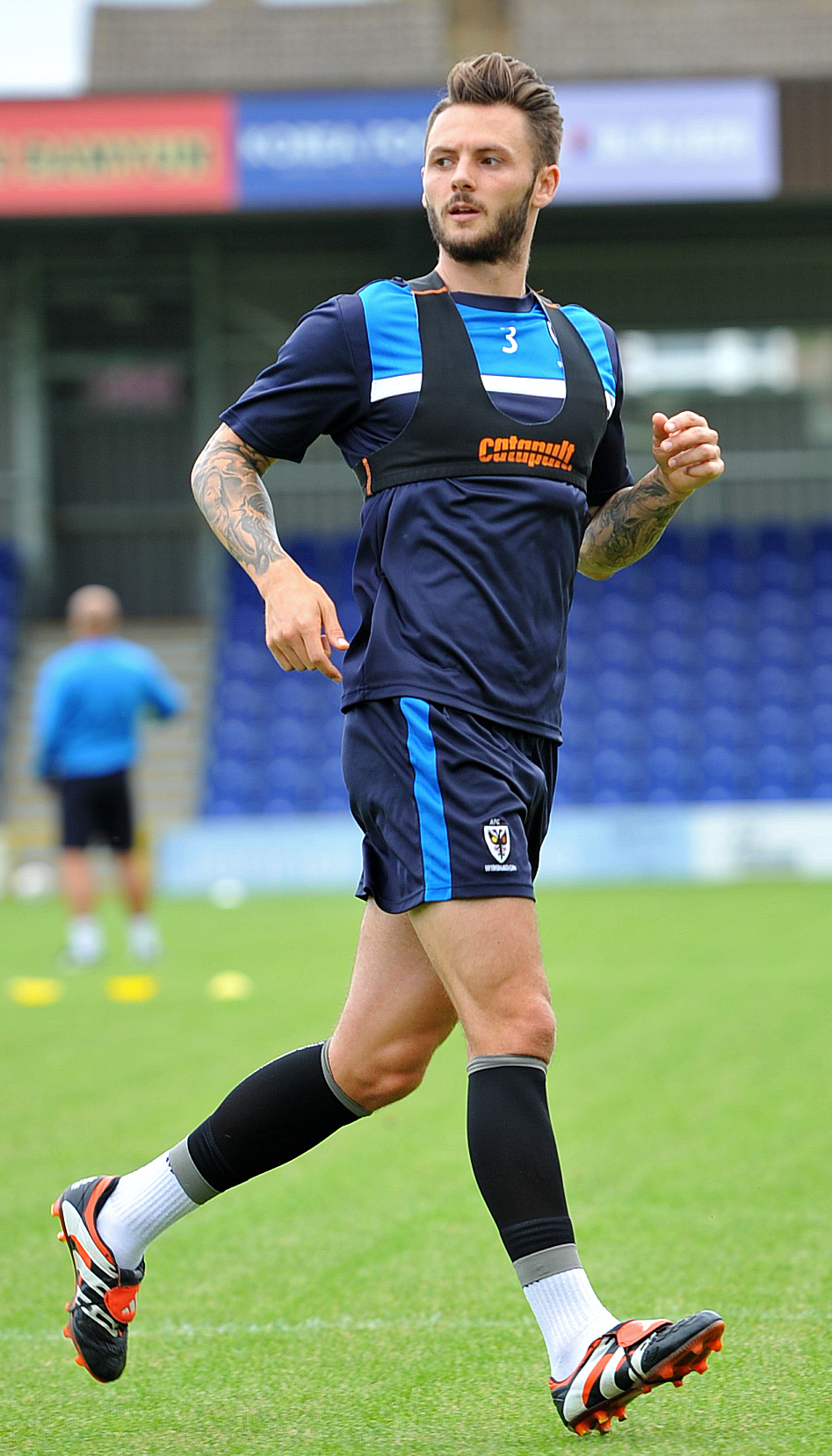
- Kennedy in training with AFC Wimbledon in 2015

Personal information
- Full name: Callum Ewan Kennedy
- Date of birth: 9 November 1989 (age 36)
- Place of birth: Chertsey, England
- Position: Defender

Youth career
- Reading
- –2007: Swindon Town

Senior career*
Years	Team	Apps	(Gls)
2007–2012	Swindon Town	33	(1)
2010	→ Gillingham (loan)	3	(0)
2011	→ Rotherham United (loan)	5	(0)
2012–2013	Scunthorpe United	17	(0)
2013–2016	AFC Wimbledon	67	(1)
2016–2017	Leyton Orient	32	(1)
2017–2018	AFC Wimbledon	14	(0)
2018–2020	Billericay Town	32	(1)
2020–2025	Dorking Wanderers	32	(1)
2022–2023	Dorking Wanderers B	3	(1)
Total		238	(6)
- * Club domestic league appearances and goals as of 14:19, 27 May 2025 (UTC)

Callum Ewan Kennedy (born 9 November 1989) is an English former professional footballer who played as a defender.

== Career ==
=== Swindon Town ===
Born in Chertsey, Surrey, Kennedy made his professional debut for Swindon Town at home to Brentford, in a 4–1 win in the Football League Trophy on 4 September 2007. Kennedy signed an eighteen-month professional contract with Swindon in February 2008 before being made captain of the reserve team. He was handed his Football League debut by caretaker manager David Byrne in a 1–1 draw at home to Carlisle United on 6 December 2008. He played 82 minutes before being substituted for Kevin Amankwaah. Kennedy started the next two games as well, a 1–0 away loss to Crewe Alexandra on 13 December 2008 which saw Kennedy play the full match, and a 3–2 home loss to Yeovil Town on 20 December 2008 where he played for 83 minutes before being substituted for Blair Sturrock. Kennedy did well in the three matches he played and signed a new one-year deal in February 2009. He made one more appearance during the 2008–09 season, an away loss to Yeovil, when he came on as a substitute after 24 minutes and played in an unfamiliar left midfield position after an injury to Hal Robson-Kanu.

Kennedy continued to be on the fringes of the first team at the start of the 2009–10 season, coming on as a substitute in 3 of the opening 4 games before playing the entire League Cup second-round game at Premier League side Wolverhampton Wanderers. The game went to a penalty shoot-out with Kennedy taking and scoring Swindon's first penalty. However Wolves went on to win the shoot-out 6–5. 4 games later Kennedy came on as a second-half substitute against Walsall and put in an impressive performance that boosted his hopes of getting a starting place in the first team. He got his wish and started 4 of the following 5 games, however he missed the next two games before returning to the starting line-up in a FA Cup first-round game at home to Woking that ended in a 1–0 win for Swindon. Following this Kennedy suffered a massive blow when he suffered a stress fracture of the pelvis that sidelined him for the rest of the season. He returned to light training in March 2010 and although he took part in Swindon's pre-season tour of Austria, Kennedy had not yet returned to full training.

He returned from injury in mid August 2010 claiming he was ready for Swindon's first team and got himself back onto the fringes of the first team. After coming on against Brentford on 21 August, he started three consecutive games, all of which ended in clean sheets for Swindon, with two victories. Despite this, when Alan Sheehan re-signed for the club in September, Kennedy was dropped to the bench finding himself behind both Sheehan and Michael Rose in the pecking order. As a result of this Kennedy agreed to join Gillingham on a month's loan on 9 November 2010. Whilst at Gillingham Kennedy made 3 appearances against Crewe, Oxford United and Barnet. After the loan spell was completed, he returned to Swindon and signed a one-year extension to his contract. Still unable to break into the Swindon first team, Kennedy went out on loan again, this time to Rotherham United on an initial month loan on 11 February 2011. The deal was extended to the end of the season on 16 March. His spell with Rotherham got off to a bad start when he was sent off in his debut for the club against Oxford United when he brought down Steve MacLean in the box, who scored the subsequent penalty to give Oxford a 2–1 victory. In total Kennedy made 5 appearances for Rotherham.

By the time Kennedy returned to the County Ground Swindon had been relegated to League Two and had a new manager in Paolo Di Canio who made Kennedy his first choice left back. He scored his first career goal and Swindon's first of the 2011–12 season during the opening game of the season against Crewe. The goal was a penalty following a foul on Billy Bodin by Adam Dugdale. The game ended in a 3–0 win for Swindon. Kennedy went on to start the first thirteen matches of the new campaign. With Swindon making an indifferent start, di Canio brought Liam Ridehalgh in on loan from Huddersfield Town on 28 September 2011. As a result, Kennedy was dropped from the first team, only appearing in the 4–1 FA Cup win over Huddersfield in which Ridehalgh was not allowed to play. It wasn't until the turn of the year when Kennedy again made the starting eleven, appearing in four consecutive victories, including a famous win over Premier League side Wigan Athletic in the FA Cup. After appearing in a big 4–1 win at promotion chasing Southend and then helping Swindon to the 2012 Football League Trophy Final the following week, Kennedy made just two more starts over the next two months as during the buildup to the Wembley final, di Canio signed Jay McEveley on loan from Barnsley and thrust him straight into the starting eleven. Kennedy was to make just one more appearance for Swindon, in a 2–1 defeat at Aldershot Town in a game where a point would have sealed promotion. Even though Swindon won the League Two title, Kennedy was released on 18 May 2012 after his contract was not going to be renewed and he left with four other Swindon players.

=== Scunthorpe United ===
Following his release from Swindon Town, Kennedy attracted interest from Scunthorpe United, Yeovil and Crewe. It was League One side Scunthorpe who won the race to sign Kennedy when the 23-year-old joined the club on 20 June 2012. Kennedy spent one season with "The Iron", making 18 appearances in all competitions, starting 12 of the games, but didn't play for the club after a 3–0 loss at Yeovil on 16 February 2013, a game were Kennedy played 83 minutes before being substituted for Eddie Nolan. At the end of the 2012–13 season, Kennedy was made available by the newly relegated Scunthorpe and it looked like he would sign for Oxford United, but the deal fell through on 20 June 2013. Kennedy's stay at Scunthorpe came to an end by mutual consent.

=== AFC Wimbledon ===
On 4 July 2013, Kennedy joined League Two side AFC Wimbledon on a free transfer. He was given the number 3 shirt for the forthcoming 2013–14 season. At the end of that season Kennedy was released by Neal Ardley, however was allowed to continue training over the summer with the Dons and appeared in a number of pre-season fixtures. He was eventually re-signed at the start of the 2014–15 season but with squad number 17. Kennedy scored his first goal for Wimbledon in a 2–0 win over Hartlepool United on 31 October 2015. His second goal came a week later in a 2–1 defeat to Forest Green Rovers in the FA Cup. On 30 May 2016 Kennedy was a member of the AFC team that beat Plymouth Argyle 2–0 at Wembley Stadium to win the EFL League Two play-offs. Kennedy cites the play-off triumph as a major career highlight. Shortly after the final Kennedy was released by Wimbledon, when his contract expired.

=== Leyton Orient ===
Kennedy signed for Leyton Orient in June 2016. He scored his first goal for Orient in a 3–1 defeat at Doncaster Rovers on 26 November 2016.

=== Return to AFC Wimbledon ===
Kennedy re-signed for AFC Wimbledon, for a second spell, on 7 July 2017.

He was released by AFC Wimbledon at the end of the 2017–18 season.

=== Billericay Town ===
On 6 June 2018, Kennedy signed for National League South club Billericay Town. Kennedy's appearances for Billericay were limited by injuries before he left the club in March 2020

=== Dorking Wanderers ===
On 1 March 2020, Kennedy signed for National League South club Dorking Wanderers. Kennedy's first two seasons were heavily impacted due to the COVID-19 Pandemic halting the league seasons. On 21 May 2022 Dorking Wanderers defeated Ebbsfleet United 3–2 to see them reach the National League for the first time in their history.

== Career statistics ==
As of match played 26 December 2015.

Appearances and goals by club, season and competition
Club	Season	League			FA Cup		League Cup		Other		Total	
Club	Season	Division	Apps	Goals	Apps	Goals	Apps	Goals	Apps	Goals	Apps	Goals
Swindon Town	2007–08	League One	0	0	0	0	0	0	1 (Note: Appearance in Football League Trophy)	0	1	0
Swindon Town	2008–09	League One	4	0	0	0	0	0	0	0	4	0
Swindon Town	2009–10	League One	8	0	1	0	2	0	0	0	11	0
Swindon Town	2010–11	League One	3	0	0	0	0	0	1	0	4	0
Swindon Town	2011–12	League Two	18	1	2	0	2	0	1	0	23	1
Swindon Town	Total		33	1	3	0	4	0	3	0	43	1
Gillingham (loan)	2010–11	League Two	3	0	—		—		—		3	0
Rotherham United (loan)	2010–11	League Two	5	0	—		—		—		5	0
Scunthorpe United	2012–13	League One	17	0	0	0	1	0	0	0	18	0
AFC Wimbledon	2013–14	League Two	22	0	1	0	1	0	1	0	25	0
AFC Wimbledon	2014–15	League Two	26	0	2	0	1	0	1	0	30	0
AFC Wimbledon	2015–16	League Two	10	1	1	1	1	0	0	0	12	2
AFC Wimbledon	Total		58	1	4	1	3	0	2	0	67	2
Career total			116	2	7	1	8	0	5	0	136	3

== Honours ==
Swindon Town

- Football League Two: 2011–12

AFC Wimbledon

- Football League Two play-offs: 2016

Dorking Wanderers

- National League South play-offs: 2022
- Surrey Senior Cup: 2022
