= 2009–10 Swindon Town F.C. season =

Swindon Town
2009–10 season
- Chairman: Andrew Fitton
- Manager: Danny Wilson
- League One: 5th
- Playoffs: Runners-up (lost to Millwall)
- FA Cup: Third round (Knocked out by Fulham)
- League Cup: Second round (Knocked out by Wolverhampton Wanderers)
- Football League Trophy: Southern Section quarter-finalists (Knocked out by Norwich City)
- Wiltshire Premier Shield: Champions
- Top goalscorer: League: Billy Paynter (19); All: Billy Paynter (22)
- Highest home attendance: 14,508 vs Leeds United (26 January 2010)
- Lowest home attendance: 4,805 vs Woking (7 November 2009)
Home colours	Away colours	Third colours

The 2009–10 season was Swindon Town's third consecutive season in League One, having won promotion from League Two in 2006-07. Swindon reached the playoff final, losing to Millwall. The club also competed in the FA Cup, the League Cup, and the Football League Trophy.

== Pre-season ==
For the third consecutive year, Swindon Town ventured to Austria for pre-season training. This was manager Danny Wilson's first summer as Swindon manager as he took over in late December 2008, replacing Maurice Malpas.

15 players from the previous season, including influential forward Simon Cox, had either been released by Wilson or in the case of Cox sold. Trialist Cherno Samba joined Town during the trip.

The rest of the summer consisted of Town playing against familiar opposition such as Wiltshire outfits Chippenham Town and Swindon Supermarine. Championship club Cardiff City, West Bromwich Albion and Plymouth Argyle were named as Town's home opposition.

Trial players who featured for Swindon Town during Pre-Season

- Cherno Samba: Once a highly rated forward, Samba joined Town for the Pre-Season work out in Austria. He failed to score in four fixtures.
- Anton Ademol: An unknown midfielder played against Hungerford Town and Chippenham Town. He failed to earn a deal.
- Stephen Morrison: Former Everton youth midfielder played against Hungerford Town and scored. Danny Wilson gave him a second chance at Chippenham Town but failed to earn a contract.
- Scott Spencer: Former Everton forward who scored against Hungerford Town. He failed to earn a contract at Swindon but later joined Southend United where he scored a late goal against Swindon during the season.
- Berlin Ndebe-Nlome: The former Cameroon youth forward played in the high profile friendlies against Cardiff City and West Bromwich Albion but failed to impress.
- Yan Klukowski: A Wiltshire native who forged a decent reputation with the American College leagues. He finished the Pre-Season as Town's top scorer with 3 goals in 3 games for Swindon. Despite impressing, he failed to win a contract.
- Bradley Clark: The Hungerford Town forward impressed the Town coaches and was offered a trial.
- Panikos Efythmides: Greek midfielder who played the final two Town friendlies.
- Dean McDonald: Former Ipswich Town forward who played in Town's final friendly of Pre-Season against Cirencester Town. McDonald scored but did not earn a Town deal. He later joined Farnborough.

Date	Opponents	H / A	Result F–A	Scorers	Attendance
12 July 2009	CFC Cluj	N	1–1	Anthony McNamee 29'	unknown
15 July 2009	Universitatea Craiova	N	1–0	Lescinel Jean-François 17'	unknown
17 July 2009	TSV St. Johann	N	3–3	Billy Paynter 10', 70' Sean Morrison 54'	unknown
20 July 2009	Hungerford Town	A	3–0	Stephen Morrison 47', Billy Bodin 82', Scott Spencer 89'	unknown
21 July 2009	Luton Town	A	1–0	Jonathan Douglas 58'	1,524
22 July 2009	Chippenham Town	A	0–2		unknown
25 July 2009	Cardiff City	H	0–0		2,157
28 July 2009	West Bromwich Albion	H	1–0	Gordon Greer 33'	3,482
29 July 2009	Swindon Supermarine	A	3–2	J-P McGovern 25', Yan Klukowski 54', 56'	279
1 August 2009	Plymouth Argyle	H	0–2		2,064
4 August 2009	Cirencester Town	A	3–0	Yan Klukowski 20', Dean McDonald 61', Jordan Record 80'	285

== League One ==
Date	Opponents	H / A	Result F–A	Scorers	Attendance
8 August 2009	Gillingham	A	0–5		6,852
15 August 2009	Milton Keynes Dons	H	0–0		6,692
18 August 2009	Southampton	H	1–0	Sean Morrison 9'	11,673
22 August 2009	Oldham Athletic	A	2–2	J-P McGovern 83', Billy Paynter 90'	4,229
29 August 2009	Southend United	H	2–1	Scott Cuthbert 21', Tope Obadeyi 79'	6,417
5 September 2009	Yeovil Town	A	1–0	Terrell Forbes (own goal) 41'	4,807
12 September 2009	Colchester United	H	1–1	Tope Obadeyi 45'	6,621
19 September 2009	Walsall	A	1–1	Billy Paynter (pen.) 80'	4,148
26 September 2009	Wycombe Wanderers	H	1–1	Kevin Amankwaah 17'	6,929
29 September 2009	Exeter City	A	1–1	Kevin Amankwaah 53'	5,337
3 October 2009	Brentford	H	3–2	Alex Revell 8', 79', Ben Hutchinson 21'	6,471
10 October 2009	Millwall	H	1–1	Scott Cuthbert 15'	7,222
17 October 2009	Hartlepool United	H	0–3		7,096
24 October 2009	Norwich City	A	0–1		24,959
31 October 2009	Tranmere Rovers	A	4–1	Billy Paynter 34', 39', Anthony McNamee 65', Simon Ferry 90'	5,811
21 November 2009	Carlisle United	A	1–0	Charlie Austin 3'	4,339
24 November 2009	Huddersfield Town	H	2–1	Billy Paynter 24', Charlie Austin 58'	6,630
5 December 2009	Leyton Orient	H	3–2	Billy Paynter (pen) 51', Charlie Austin 76', 85'	6,815
12 December 2009	Bristol Rovers	A	0–3		7,613
19 December 2009	Brighton & Hove Albion	H	2–1	Billy Paynter (pen) 31', Charlie Austin 54'	7,068
26 December 2009	Charlton Athletic	A	2–2	Charlie Austin 56', Billy Paynter 74'	17,977
28 December 2009	Yeovil Town	H	3–1	Billy Paynter 13', Charlie Austin 22', Danny Ward 46'	8,509
16 January 2010	Gillingham	H	3–1	Charlie Austin 38', Scott Cuthbert 52', Billy Paynter (pen) 74'	6,773
19 January 2010	Stockport County	A	1–0	Billy Paynter (pen) 73'	3,281
26 January 2010	Leeds United	H	3–0	Charlie Austin 13', Billy Paynter 60', 63' (pen)	14,508
30 January 2010	Southend United	A	2–2	Billy Paynter 1', Charlie Austin 10'	6,669
6 February 2010	Charlton Athletic	H	1–1	Kevin Amankwaah 65'	9,552
23 February 2010	Oldham Athletic	H	4–2	Billy Paynter 45', 45' (pen), Charlie Austin 48', Danny Ward 58'	6,183
13 February 2010	Huddersfield Town	A	2–2	Charlie Austin 10', Danny Ward 27'	14,610
20 February 2010	Carlisle United	H	2–0	Charlie Austin, Billy Paynter	7,704
23 February 2010	Stockport County	H	4–1	Danny Ward 13', Billy Paynter 45', 79', Simon Ferry 74'	7,063
27 February 2010	Leyton Orient	A	0–0		4,574
6 March 2010	Bristol Rovers	H	0–4		10,341
9 March 2010	Milton Keynes Dons	A	1–2	Danny Ward 90'	8,764
13 March 2010	Brighton & Hove Albion	A	1–0	Charlie Austin 69'	6,946
16 March 2010	Southampton	A	1–0	Charlie Austin 56'	20,752
20 March 2010	Norwich City	H	1–1	Gordon Greer 90'	11,972
27 March 2010	Hartlepool United	A	1–0	Charlie Austin 22'	3,536
3 April 2010	Leeds United	A	3–0	Billy Paynter 43', 48', Charlie Austin 55'	27,881
5 April 2010	Tranmere Rovers	H	1–0	Ben Gordon (own goal) 10', Billy Paynter (pen) 37', Charlie Austin 56'	9,495
10 April 2010	Colchester United	A	0–3		5,111
12 April 2010	Exeter City	H	1–1	Matt Taylor (own goal) 90'	8,753
17 April 2010	Walsall	H	1–1	Charlie Austin 55'	8,467
24 April 2010	Wycombe Wanderers	A	2–2	Billy Paynter 48', Alan Sheehan 80'	7,459
1 May 2010	Brentford	H	3–2	Billy Paynter 8', 58', Danny Ward 45'	10,465
8 May 2010	Milwall	A	2–3	Danny Ward 3', Billy Paynter 85'	17,083

== League One Playoffs ==
Date	Opponents	H / A	Result F–A	Scorers	Attendance
14 May 2010	Charlton	H	2–1	Danny Ward 52', Charlie Austin 60'	13,560
17 May 2010	Charlton	A	2–1 (5–4 p)	Danny Ward 74',	21,521
29 May 2010	Millwall	A	0–1		73,108

== F.A. Cup ==
After losing the First Round to Non-League Histon last season - Town were once again given the task of meeting Non-League Woking a year on. Despite a less than convincing display, Billy Paynter's first half goal was enough. The Second Round saw Swindon beat Wrexham in Wales a couple of weeks later, Gordon Greer scored the only goal ten minutes time.

Town were knocked out of the competition in the Third Round to Premier League outfit Fulham, Bobby Zamora scoring for the Cottagers.

Date	Opponents	H / A	Result F–A	Scorers	Attendance
7 November 2009	Woking	H	1–0	Billy Paynter 36'	4,805
28 November 2009	Wrexham	A	1–0	Gordon Greer 80'	3,011
2 January 2010	Fulham	A	0–1		19,623

== League Cup ==
Swindon Town entered the League Cup in the First Round and were drawn to play Milton Keynes Dons. Swindon had recently lost 5–0 at Gillingham on the opening day of the league season. Town beat the Dons comfortably at Stadium:MK by four goals to one.

Town's next game was away from Wiltshire against Premier League outfit Wolverhampton Wanderers. Wolves manager Mick McCarthy fielded an under strength team but did enough to beat Swindon Town 6–5 in a penalty shoot-out after 120 minutes of football without a goal. Swindon Town captain Gordon Greer missed the only penalty.

Date	Opponents	H / A	Result F–A	Scorers	Attendance
11 August 2009	Milton Keynes Dons	A	4–1	J-P McGovern 41', Billy Paynter 56', 72', David McCracken (own goal) 74'	4,812
25 August 2009	Wolverhampton Wanderers	A	0–0		11,416

- Wolverhampton Wanderers won 6–5 on penalties.

== Football League Trophy ==
Swindon Town were drawn to play Exeter City at St James Park where a late Stuart Fleetwood strike cancelled out Anthony McNamee's goal in the first half. The game won by Swindon 5–3 on penalties with Phil Smith saving two of the spot kicks.

Swindon were knocked out in the next round by Norwich City, penalty kicks settled the tie again - the only missed penalty was taken by Craig Easton.

Date	Opponents	H / A	Result F–A	Scorers	Attendance
6 October 2009	Exeter City	A	1–1	Anthony McNamee 17'	2,006
10 November 2009	Norwich City	H	0–0		4,978

- Swindon Town beat Exeter City 4–3 on penalties
- Norwich City beat Swindon Town 5–3 on penalties

== Squad statistics ==
Swindon Town 2009/10

No.	Pos.	Name	League (inc. P-O's)		FA Cup		League Cup		Football League Trophy		Total		Discipline	
No.	Pos.	Name	Apps	Goals	Apps	Goals	Apps	Goals	Apps	Goals	Apps	Goals	Yellow card	Red card
1	GK	(England) David Lucas	41	0	2	0	2	0	0	0	45	0	1	0
2	DF	(Scotland) Scott Cuthbert	39	3	3	0	1	0	2	0	45	3	3	0
3	DF	(Republic of Ireland) Alan Sheehan	22	1	2	0	0	0	0	0	24	0	5	0
4	MF	(Republic of Ireland) Jonathan Douglas	43	0	2	0	2	0	2	0	49	0	6	1
5	FW	(France) Vincent Péricard	2+12	0	0	0	0	0	0	0	2+12	0	0	0
6	DF	(Scotland) Gordon Greer (captain)	43+1	1	3	1	2	0	2	0	50+1	1	5	0
7	MF	(Scotland) Jon-Paul McGovern	45	1	3	0	2	1	2	0	52	2	1	0
9	FW	(England) Frank Nouble	3+5	0	0	0	0	0	0	0	3+5	0	0	0
10	MF	(Republic of Ireland) Michael Timlin	6+15	0	1+2	0	1	0	1	0	9+17	0	4	0
12	GK	(England) Phil Smith	5+1	0	1	0	0	0	2	0	8+1	0	0	0
14	DF	(England) Sean Morrison	8+1	1	0	0	1	0	0	0	9+1	0	3	0
15	DF	(England) Kevin Amankwaah	33+3	3	3	0	2	0	2	0	40+3	3	4	0
17	DF	(England) Callum Kennedy	4+4	0	1	0	1+1	0	0	0	6+5	0	0	0
18	MF	(Republic of Ireland) Alan O'Brien	3+6	0	0+1	0	0+1	0	0	0	3+8	0	0	0
19	DF	(Haiti) Lescinel Jean-François	27+6	0	1	0	1	0	2	0	31+6	0	7	0
20	FW	(Scotland) Billy Paynter	46	26	3	1	2	2	1	0	52	29	?	?
21	DF	(England) Stephen Darby (loan)	12	0	0	0	0	0	0	0	12	0	0	0
23	DF	(England) Nathan Thompson	0	0	0	0	0	0	0	0	0	0	0	0
24	FW	(England) Danny Ward (loan)	24+4	7	1	0	0	0	0	25+5	7	1	2	0
26	GK	(Poland) Jakub Jesionkowski	0	0	0	0	0	0	0	0	0	0	0	0
28	GK	(England) Mark Scott	0	0	0	0	0	0	0	0	0	0	0	0
30	MF	(Scotland) Simon Ferry	40	2	3	0	0	0	0	0	43	2	2	1
31	FW	(Wales) Billy Bodin	0	0	0	0	0	0	0	0	0	0	0	0
32	FW	(England) Charlie Austin	29+4	19	0	0	0	0	0+2	0	29+6	19	2	0
11	MF	(England) Matt Ritchie (loan)	0+4	0	0	0	0	0	0	0	0+2	0	0	0
