= Gordon Greer =

Scottish footballer

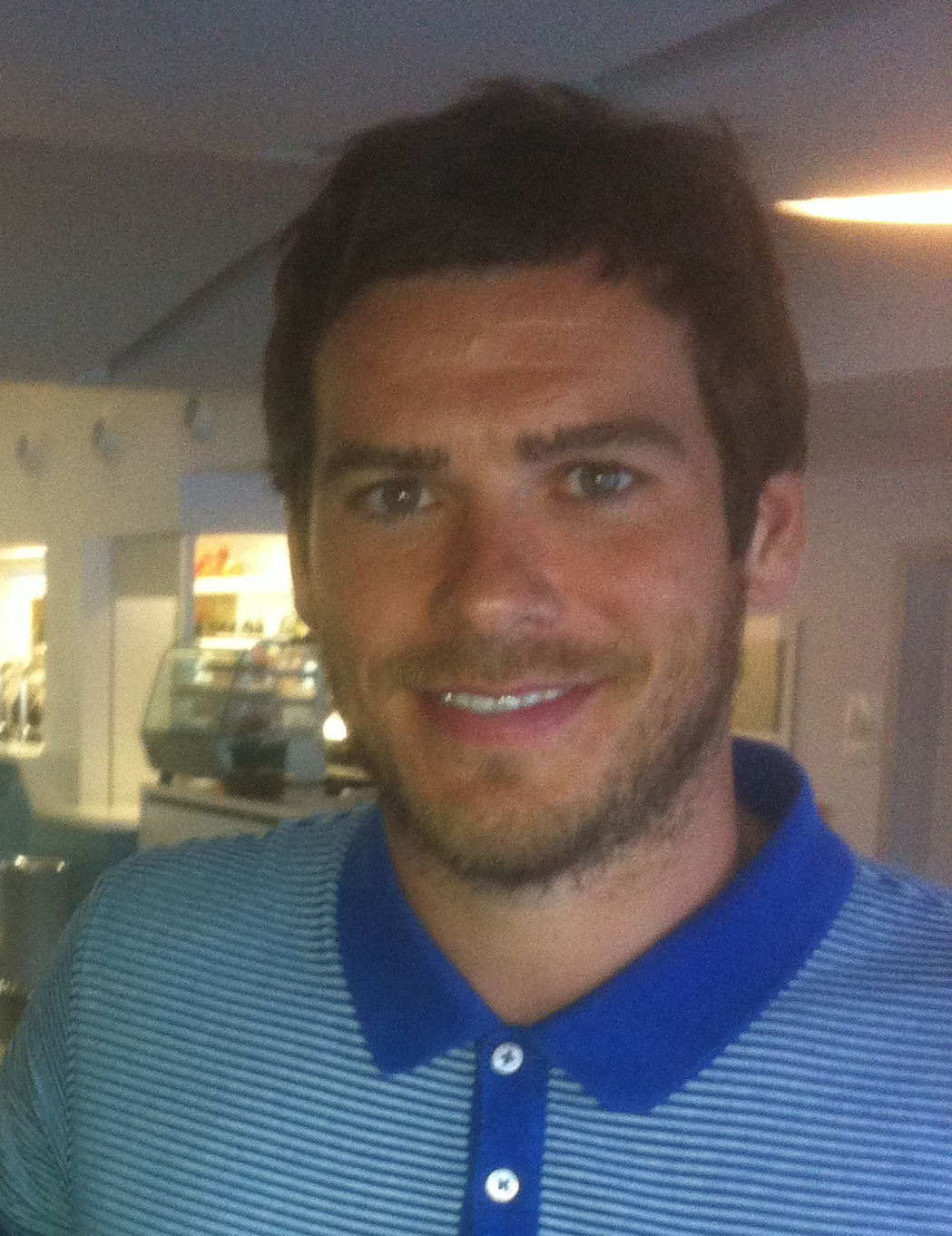
- Greer in 2012

Personal information
- Full name: Gordon Greer
- Date of birth: 14 December 1980 (age 45)
- Place of birth: Glasgow, Scotland
- Height: 6 ft 2 in (1.88 m)
- Position: Centre back

Senior career*
Years	Team	Apps	(Gls)
2000–2001	Clyde	30	(0)
2001–2003	Blackburn Rovers	0	(0)
2003	→ Stockport County (loan)	5	(1)
2003–2007	Kilmarnock	107	(4)
2007–2009	Doncaster Rovers	12	(1)
2009	→ Swindon Town (loan)	19	(2)
2009–2010	Swindon Town	46	(1)
2010–2016	Brighton & Hove Albion	209	(5)
2016–2017	Blackburn Rovers	21	(0)
2017–2018	Kilmarnock	20	(1)
Total		469	(14)

International career
2005–2006	Scotland B	2	(0)
2013–2016	Scotland	11	(0)
- * Club domestic league appearances and goals

Gordon Greer (born 14 December 1980) is a Scottish former professional footballer who played as a defender. Greer played for Clyde, Blackburn Rovers (two spells), Stockport County, Kilmarnock (two spells), Doncaster Rovers, Swindon Town and Brighton & Hove Albion during his career. He also played in 11 full international matches for Scotland between 2013 and 2016.

== Club career ==
Greer was born in Glasgow and after a single season with Port Glasgow Juniors, began his professional career with Clyde, where he played in only 33 matches before securing a £250,000 move to English Premiership club Blackburn Rovers. Greer made only appearance for Blackburn in the Football League Cup.

Greer had a spell on loan with Stockport County, scoring once versus Wycombe Wanderers before returning to Scotland to play for Scottish Premier League club Kilmarnock. Greer first received international recognition, having been capped for Scotland B versus Poland B in December 2005 and versus Republic of Ireland B in November 2006.

In July 2007, Greer signed for Doncaster Rovers after he rejected a new contract offer from Kilmarnock. Greer's first season at Doncaster was blighted by several injuries and he was restricted to only six appearances in the 2007–08 season, though he did manage to score his first goal for the club, against AFC Bournemouth. During the 2008–09 season Greer joined League One club Swindon Town on an initial one-month loan, that was later extended for a further two months thanks to a financial contribution from TrustSTFC's Red Army Fund. On his return to Doncaster, Greer was released from his contract on 7 May 2009, after only 12 appearances in two seasons with the club.

Following his release from Doncaster, Greer soon agreed a two-year contract with Swindon Town on a free transfer in July 2009, having impressed after his loan at the club. After officially joining the club, Greer was announced as the club's captain for the 2009–10 season. On 17 May 2010, Greer was shown a straight red card for a high tackle in the play-off 2nd leg versus Charlton Athletic, that Swindon went on to win on penalties. Greer's sending off meant that he was suspended from the play-off final versus Millwall on 29 May 2010.

On 10 July 2010, after weeks of speculation and numerous verbal and written approaches for Greer, it was suggested that he would travel down to Brighton & Hove Albion on the following Monday for a medical to agree a move to the Seagulls for a reported fee of £250,000 on a three-year deal. The deal was delayed until the next day, when Greer completed his move to the Seagulls. On 4 August 2010, it was also revealed that Brighton manager Gus Poyet had given Greer the club captaincy for the 2010–11 season.

Greer made his Brighton debut in the second game of the season on 14 August 2010 versus Rochdale after serving a two-match ban but was sent off after 51 minutes for violent conduct in a 2–2 draw. One of Rochdale's goals came from a penalty after Greer's red card incident. Greer then helped guide Brighton to winning the League One title and promotion to the Championship that season and stayed as on as club captain for the 2011–12 season. Greer scored his first Seagulls goal in a 2–0 win versus Barnsley in October 2011. In January 2012, Greer received another straight red card for violent conduct in Brighton's 3–0 win versus Southampton, his sending off arriving only three minutes before the end of the match. At the end of that season, Greer was subject to a bid from Barnsley, that was rejected and Poyet later stated that he wasn't up for sale.

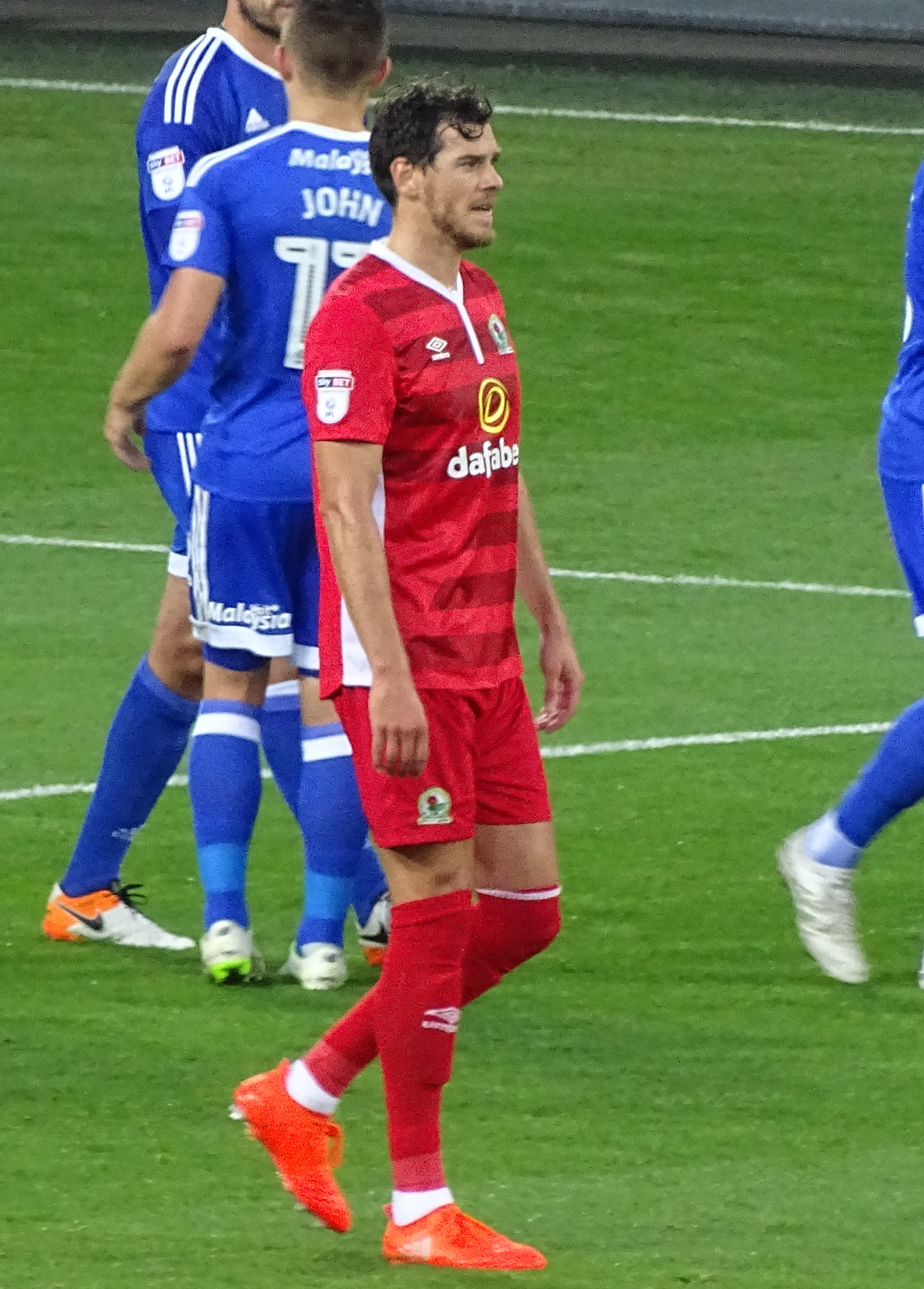
Greer playing for Blackburn Rovers in 2016.

Greer was released by Brighton at the end of the 2015–16 season. Greer then signed a one-year contract with Blackburn Rovers. and his league debut was on 6 August 2016 versus Norwich City at Ewood Park. Greer was released by Rovers at the end of the 2016–17 season, during which the Ewood Park club were relegated to League One.

Greer returned to East Ayrshire to rejoin Kilmarnock in July 2017 for the 2017–18 season. He made his last appearance for Kilmarnock in February 2018, and was released from his contract in August 2018.

Greer announced his retirement from playing in October 2018.

== International career ==
On 21 May 2013, Greer was called up to the Scotland squad for the first time for the 2014 World Cup qualifier versus Croatia. Greer received a second call-up on 23 August 2013. Greer made his international debut later that year, becoming the oldest player to make his first appearance for Scotland since Ronnie Simpson in the 1960s. Greer made his first competitive appearance in October 2014, partnering Russell Martin in a UEFA Euro 2016 qualifying match versus Poland. Greer made 11 appearances for Scotland in total, with his last cap coming in June 2016.

== Career statistics ==
=== Club ===
Appearances and goals by club, season and competition
Club	Season	League			National cup		League cup		Other		Total	
Club	Season	Division	Apps	Goals	Apps	Goals	Apps	Goals	Apps	Goals	Apps	Goals
Clyde	2000–01	Scottish First Division	30	0	1	0	1	0	1 (Note: Appearance in Scottish Challenge Cup)	0	33	0
Blackburn Rovers	2001–02	Premier League	0	0	0	0	1	0	—		1	0
Stockport County (loan)	2002–03	Second Division	5	1	0	0	0	0	0	0	5	1
Kilmarnock	2003–04	Scottish Premier League	25	0	2	0	0	0	—		27	0
Kilmarnock	2004–05	Scottish Premier League	22	1	1	0	1	0	—		24	1
Kilmarnock	2005–06	Scottish Premier League	27	2	1	0	2	0	—		30	2
Kilmarnock	2006–07	Scottish Premier League	33	1	1	0	5	1	—		39	2
Kilmarnock	Total		107	4	5	0	8	1	0	0	120	5
Doncaster Rovers	2007–08	League One	11	1	2	0	2	0	2 (Note: Appearance(s) in Football League Trophy)	0	17	1
Doncaster Rovers	2008–09	Championship	1	0	0	0	0	0	—		1	0
Doncaster Rovers	Total		12	1	2	0	2	0	2	0	18	1
Swindon Town (loan)	2008–09	League One	19	1	0	0	0	0	0	0	19	1
Swindon Town	2009–10	League One	46	1	3	1	2	0	2	0	53	2
Brighton & Hove Albion	2010–11	League One	32	0	4	0	0	0	0	0	36	0
Brighton & Hove Albion	2011–12	Championship	42	1	2	0	3	0	—		47	1
Brighton & Hove Albion	2012–13	Championship	38	1	2	0	1	0	2 (Note: Appearances in Championship play-offs)	0	43	1
Brighton & Hove Albion	2013–14	Championship	40	1	1	0	1	0	2	0	44	1
Brighton & Hove Albion	2014–15	Championship	37	2	2	0	1	0	—		40	2
Brighton & Hove Albion	2015–16	Championship	20	0	0	0	1	0	2	0	23	0
Brighton & Hove Albion	Total		209	5	11	0	7	0	6	0	233	5
Blackburn Rovers	2016–17	Championship	21	0	3	0	1	0	—		25	0
Kilmarnock	2017–18	Scottish Premiership	20	1	0	0	1	0	—		21	1
Kilmarnock	2018–19	Scottish Premiership	0	0	0	0	0	0	–		0	0
Kilmarnock	Total		20	1	0	0	1	0	0	0	21	1
Career total			469	14	25	1	23	1	11	0	528	16

=== International ===
Appearances and goals by national team and year
National team	Year	Apps	Goals
Scotland	2013	2	0
Scotland	2014	3	0
Scotland	2015	4	0
Scotland	2016	2	0
Total		11	0

== Honours ==
Brighton & Hove Albion

- Football League One: 2010–11

Individual

- PFA Team of the Year: 2010–11 League One
