= 2010–11 Swindon Town F.C. season =

Swindon Town
2010–11 season
- Chairman: Andrew Fitton
- Manager: Danny Wilson (until 2 March); Paul Hart (from 3 March until 28 April); Paul Bodin (from 28 April)
- Ground: County Ground
- League One: 24th (relegated)
- FA Cup: Second round
- League Cup: First round
- Football League Trophy: Quarter-finals (South West)
- Top goalscorer: League: Charlie Austin (12); All: Charlie Austin (17)
- Highest home attendance: 11,087 vs Southampton (11 September 2010)
- Lowest home attendance: 6,912 vs Tranmere Rovers (25 January 2011)
- Average home league attendance: 8,454
Home colours	Away colours	Third colours

The 2010–11 season was Swindon Town's 4th consecutive season in League One, having won promotion from League Two in 2006–07. Swindon was relegated from League One. The club also competed in the FA Cup, the League Cup, and the Football League Trophy.

== Competitions ==
=== Football League One ===
==== League table ====
Pos	Team	Pld	W	D	L	GF	GA	GD	Pts	Promotion, qualification or relegation
20	Walsall	46	12	12	22	56	75	−19	48	
21	Dagenham & Redbridge (R)	46	12	11	23	52	70	−18	47	Relegation to Football League Two
22	Bristol Rovers (R)	46	11	12	23	48	82	−34	45	Relegation to Football League Two
23	Plymouth Argyle (R)	46	15	7	24	51	74	−23	42 (Note: Plymouth Argyle deducted 10 points for insolvency.)	Relegation to Football League Two
24	Swindon Town (R)	46	9	14	23	50	72	−22	41	Relegation to Football League Two

Updated to match(es) played on 2 May 2011. Source: BBC
Rules for classification: 1) points; 2) goal difference; 3) number of goals scored.
(R) Relegated

==== Results ====
Game	Date	Opponent	Venue	Result	Goalscorers	Attendance
1	7 August 2010	Brighton & Hove Albion	H	1–2	Austin 80'	10,392
2	14 August 2010	Hartlepool United	A	2–2	Dossevi 72', Austin 74'	2,893
3	21 August 2010	Brentford	H	1–1	Prutton 40'	8,132
4	28 August 2010	Milton Keynes Dons	A	1–2	Cuthbert 45'	7,866
5	4 September 2010	Carlisle United	A	0–0	–	5,689
6	11 September 2010	Southampton	H	1–0	Austin 65'	11,087
7	18 September 2010	Walsall	A	2–1	Sheehan 10', Péricard 74'	4,580
8	25 September 2010	Huddersfield Town	H	1–0	Morrison 90'	8,652
9	28 September 2010	Plymouth Argyle	H	2–3	Prutton 37', Rose 74'	9,346
10	2 October 2010	Dagenham & Redbridge	A	1–2	Dossevi 1'	2,767
11	11 October 2010	Bristol Rovers	H	2–1	Morrison 45', Péricard 57'	9,065
12	16 October 2010	Peterborough United	A	4–5	Ball 24', 43', Ritchie 30', Austin (pen) 73'	7,077
13	23 October 2010	Leyton Orient	H	2–2	Austin 62', Rose 84'	8,384
14	30 October 2010	Yeovil Town	A	3–3	Austin 23', Morrison 87', McGovern 88'	4,671
15	2 November 2010	Charlton Athletic	H	0–3	–	7,939
16	13 November 2010	Colchester United	H	2–1	Dossevi 29', Austin 54'	7,679
17	20 November 2010	Rochdale	A	3–3	Timlin 1', Austin 78', Rose 80'	2,866
18	23 November 2010	Notts County	A	0–1	–	4,644
19	4 December 2010	Sheffield Wednesday	H	2–1	Austin 24', McGovern 70'	9,123
20	28 December 2010	Peterborough United	H	1–1	Austin (pen) 72'	8,592
21	1 January 2011	Bournemouth	H	1–2	Ritchie 21'	8,874
22	3 January 2011	Charlton Athletic	A	4–2	Ritchie 41', Austin 56', 81', Morrison 77'	14,740
23	8 January 2011	Oldham Athletic	A	0–2	–	3,573
24	15 January 2011	Yeovil Town	H	0–1	–	7,950
25	22 January 2011	Bristol Rovers	A	1–3	McGovern 66'	6,972
26	25 January 2011	Tranmere Rovers	H	0–0	–	6,912
27	29 January 2011	Exeter City	H	0–0	–	8,132
28	1 February 2011	Bournemouth	A	2–3	Caddis 21', Ritchie 58'	7,212
29	5 February 2011	Rochdale	H	1–1	Benyon 90'	7,386
30	8 February 2011	Leyton Orient	A	0–3	–	4,214
31	12 February 2011	Colchester United	A	1–2	Cuthbert 51'	3,624
32	19 February 2011	Carlisle United	H	0–1	–	7,592
33	26 February 2011	Southampton	A	1–4	Ritchie 54'	22,627
34	5 March 2011	Walsall	H	0–0	–	10,489
35	8 March 2011	Plymouth Argyle	A	0–1	–	8,830
36	12 March 2011	Dagenham & Redbridge	H	1–1	Grella 44'	7,864
37	19 March 2011	Huddersfield Town	A	0–0	–	14,000
38	26 March 2011	Brighton & Hove Albion	A	1–2	Prutton 22'	7,562
39	29 March 2011	Exeter City	A	1–0	–	4,174
40	2 April 2011	Hartlepool United	H	1–1	Ritchie 67'	7,146
41	9 April 2011	Brentford	A	1–0	Andrew 80'	4,593
42	16 April 2011	Milton Keynes Dona	H	0–1	–	8,305
43	23 April 2011	Notts County	H	1–2	Ritchie 18'	8.064
44	25 April 2011	Sheffield Wednesday	A	1–3	Douglas 43'	17,348
45	30 April 2011	Oldham Athletic	H	0–2	–	7,420
46	7 May 2011	Tranmere Rovers	A	2–0	Jean-Francois 10', Timlin 38'	5,302

=== FA Cup ===
Round	Date	Opponent	Venue	Result	Goalscorers	Attendance
First round	6 November 2010	Plymouth Argyle	A	4–0	Morrison 23', Austin 41, Péricard 52', Ritchie 69'	5,226
Second round	26 November 2010	Crawley Town	A	1–1	Austin 66'	3,895
Second round replay	7 December 2010	Crawley Town	H	2–3 (a.e.t.)	McGovern 18', Austin 41'	2,955

=== League Cup ===
Round	Date	Opponent	Venue	Result	Goalscorers	Attendance
First round	10 August 2010	Leyton Orient	H	1–2	McGovern 35'	4,450

=== Football League Trophy ===
Round	Date	Opponent	Venue	Result	Goalscorers	Attendance
First round	31 August 2010	Southampton	A	3–0	Péricard 29', 90', Austin 63'	8,333
Second round	5 October 2010	Torquay United	H	2–0	Ball 10', Péricard 45'	3,625
Area quarter-final	9 November 2010	Brentford	H	1–1 (2–4 p)	Austin 12'	3,469

== Players ==
=== Appearances and goals ===
Last updated 28 June 2011

No.	Pos	Nat	Player	Total		League One		FA Cup		League Cup		FL Trophy	
No.	Pos	Nat	Player	Apps	Goals	Apps	Goals	Apps	Goals	Apps	Goals	Apps	Goals
1	GK	(England) ENG	David Lucas	23	0	21	0	0	0	0	0	2	0
2	DF	(Scotland) SCO	Scott Cuthbert	48	2	41	2	3	0	1	0	3	0
3	DF	(England) ENG	Michael Rose	41	3	35	3	3	0	1	0	2	0
4	MF	(Republic of Ireland) IRL	Jonathan Douglas	45	1	39	1	3	0	1	0	2	0
5	DF	(England) ENG	Andy Frampton	23	0	23	0	0	0	0	0	0	0
6	DF	(Scotland) SCO	Paul Caddis	42	1	38	1	2	0	1	0	1	0
7	MF	(Scotland) SCO	Jon-Paul McGovern	45	5	38	3	3	1	1	1	3	0
8	MF	(Scotland) SCO	Simon Ferry	24	0	21	0	1	0	1	0	1	0
9	FW	(France) FRA	Vincent Pericard	24	6	18	2	3	1	0	0	3	3
10	MF	(England) ENG	David Prutton	46	3	41	3	3	0	1	0	1	0
11	MF	(Republic of Ireland) IRL	Michael Timlin	27	2	22	2	3	0	0	0	2	0
12	GK	(England) ENG	Phil Smith	32	0	27	0	3	0	1	0	1	0
14	DF	(England) ENG	Sean Morrison	25	5	19	4	3	1	0	0	3	0
14	DF	(Czech Republic) CZE	Milan Misun	0	0	0	0	0	0	0	0	0	0
15	DF	(England) ENG	Kevin Amankwaah	23	0	19	0	1	0	1	0	2	0
16	FW	(England) ENG	David Ball	22	3	18	2	1	0	1	0	2	1
16	DF	(England) ENG	Aden Flint	3	0	3	0	0	0	0	0	0	0
17	DF	(England) ENG	Callum Kennedy	4	0	3	0	0	0	0	0	1	0
18	MF	(Republic of Ireland) IRL	Alan O'Brien	26	0	21	0	1	0	1	0	3	0
19	DF	(Haiti) HAI	Lescinel Jean-Francois	21	1	18	1	1	0	1	0	1	0
20	FW	(Togo) TOG	Thomas Dossevi	31	3	27	3	3	0	1	0	0	0
21	DF	(Republic of Ireland) IRL	Alan Sheehan	23	1	21	1	2	0	0	0	0	0
22	MF	(England) ENG	Matt Ritchie	41	8	36	7	3	1	0	0	2	0
23	DF	(England) ENG	Nathan Thompson	4	0	3	0	0	0	0	0	1	0
24	FW	(England) ENG	Elliot Benyon	12	1	12	1	0	0	0	0	0	0
25	FW	(England) ENG	Jonathan Obika	5	0	5	0	0	0	0	0	0	0
26	GK	(Poland) POL	Jakub Jesionkowski	0	0	0	0	0	0	0	0	0	0
27	FW	(United States) USA	Mike Grella	7	1	7	1	0	0	0	0	0	0
28	GK	(England) ENG	Mark Scott	0	0	0	0	0	0	0	0	0	0
29	MF	(France) FRA	Alassane N'Diaye	6	0	6	0	0	0	0	0	0	0
30	FW	(England) ENG	Calvin Andrew	10	1	10	1	0	0	0	0	0	0
31	FW	(Wales) WAL	Billy Bodin	5	0	5	0	0	0	0	0	0	0
32	FW	(England) ENG	Charlie Austin	27	17	21	12	3	3	1	0	2	2
33	FW	(England) ENG	Jordan Pavett	0	0	0	0	0	0	0	0	0	0
34	DF	(England) ENG	Will Evans	1	0	0	0	0	0	0	0	1	0
35	MF	(England) ENG	Matt Clark	0	0	0	0	0	0	0	0	0	0

=== Disciplinary record ===
Includes all competitive matches.

2010-11 Season stats

Number	Nation	Position	Name	League One		FA Cup		League Cup		FL Trophy		Total	
Number	Nation	Position	Name	Booked	Sent off (straight red)	Booked	Sent off (straight red)	Booked	Sent off (straight red)	Booked	Sent off (straight red)	Booked	Sent off (straight red)
1	(England) ENG	GK	David Lucas	0	0	0	0	0	0	0	0	0	0
2	(Scotland) SCO	DF	Scott Cuthbert	2	0	0	0	0	0	0	0	2	0
3	(England) ENG	DF	Michael Rose	3	1	0	0	0	0	0	0	3	1
4	(Republic of Ireland) IRL	MF	Jonathan Douglas	6	0	0	1	1	0	0	0	7	1
5	(England) ENG	DF	Andy Frampton	3	1	0	0	0	0	0	0	3	1
6	(Scotland) SCO	DF	Paul Caddis	3	0	0	0	0	0	0	0	3	0
7	(Scotland) SCO	MF	Jon-Paul McGovern	0	0	0	0	0	0	0	0	0	0
8	(Scotland) SCO	MF	Simon Ferry	0	0	0	0	0	0	0	0	0	0
9	(France) FRA	FW	Vincent Pericard	0	0	0	0	0	0	0	0	0	0
10	(England) ENG	MF	David Prutton	6	2	0	0	0	0	0	0	6	2
11	(Republic of Ireland) IRL	MF	Michael Timlin	3	0	0	0	0	0	0	0	3	0
12	(England) ENG	GK	Phil Smith	1	0	0	0	0	0	0	0	1	0
14	(England) ENG	DF	Sean Morrison	1	0	1	0	0	0	0	0	2	0
15	(England) ENG	DF	Kevin Amankwaah	0	0	0	0	0	0	0	0	0	0
16	(England) ENG	FW	David Ball	0	0	0	0	0	0	0	0	0	0
16	(England) ENG	DF	Aden Flint	0	0	0	0	0	0	0	0	0	0
17	(England) ENG	DF	Callum Kennedy	0	0	0	0	0	0	0	0	0	0
18	(Republic of Ireland) IRL	MF	Alan O'Brien	0	0	0	0	0	0	0	0	0	0
19	(Haiti) HAI	MF	Lescinel Jean-Francois	2	0	0	0	0	0	0	0	2	0
20	(Togo) TOG	FW	Thomas Dossevi	4	0	0	0	0	0	0	0	4	0
21	(Republic of Ireland) IRL	DF	Alan Sheehan	5	1	0	0	0	0	0	0	5	1
22	(England) ENG	FW	Matt Ritchie	1	0	0	0	0	0	0	0	1	0
23	(England) ENG	DF	Nathan Thompson	0	0	0	0	0	0	0	0	0	0
24	(England) ENG	FW	Elliot Benyon	1	0	0	0	0	0	0	0	1	0
25	(England) ENG	FW	Jonathan Obika	0	0	0	0	0	0	0	0	0	0
27	(United States) USA	FW	Mike Grella	1	0	0	0	0	0	0	0	1	0
29	(France) FRA	MF	Alassane N'Diaye	0	0	0	0	0	0	0	0	0	0
29	(England) ENG	FW	Calvin Andrew	1	0	0	0	0	0	0	0	1	0
31	(Wales) WAL	MF	Billy Bodin	1	0	0	0	0	0	0	0	1	0
29	(England) ENG	FW	Charlie Austin	4	0	0	0	0	0	1	0	5	0
33	(England) ENG	FW	Miles Storey	0	0	0	0	0	0	0	0	0	0
34	(England) ENG	DF	Will Evans	0	0	0	0	0	0	0	0	0	0
35	(England) ENG	MF	Matt Clark	0	0	0	0	0	0	0	0	0	0
			TOTALS	48	5	1	1	1	0	1	0	51	6
