= Michael Timlin =

English footballer (born 1985)

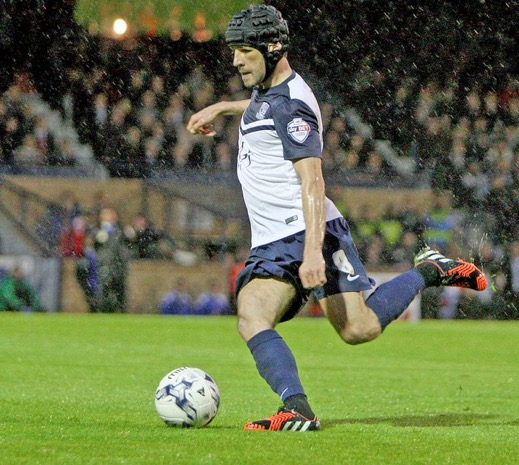
- Timlin playing for Southend Utd v Stevenage in 2015

Personal information
- Full name: Michael Anthony Timlin
- Date of birth: 19 March 1985 (age 41)
- Place of birth: Lambeth, England
- Height: 5 ft 9 in (1.75 m)
- Position: Midfielder

Youth career
- –2002: Fulham

Senior career*
Years	Team	Apps	(Gls)
2002–2008	Fulham	0	(0)
2006	→ Scunthorpe United (loan)	1	(0)
2006	→ Doncaster Rovers (loan)	3	(0)
2006–2007	→ Swindon Town (loan)	24	(1)
2008	→ Swindon Town (loan)	10	(1)
2008–2012	Swindon Town	86	(4)
2010	→ Southend United (loan)	8	(1)
2011	→ Southend United (loan)	16	(3)
2012–2018	Southend United	190	(8)
2018–2019	Stevenage	42	(1)
2019–2020	Stevenage	13	(0)
2020	Ebbsfleet United	4	(0)
2020–	Dulwich Hamlet	38	(1)

International career
2002	Republic of Ireland U17	2	(1)
2006	Republic of Ireland U21	7	(0)
- * Club domestic league appearances and goals as of 17:10, 4 May 2022 (UTC)

Michael Anthony Timlin (born 19 March 1985) is an Irish professional footballer who plays as a midfielder for National League South club Dulwich Hamlet.

Born in Lambeth, England, Timlin graduated through the Fulham Academy, making his debut in a League Cup game in 2004. During this time he spent time on loan at Scunthorpe United, Doncaster Rovers and Swindon Town before joining Swindon permanently in 2008. In 2010, he moved to Southend United on loan, reuniting him with former Southend manager Paul Sturrock again having previously played under him at Swindon. In January 2012, Timlin made a permanent transfer to Southend United, after his second loan spell with them had ended. He helped the club to secure promotion out of League Two in 2014–15. The midfielder signed for Stevenage in June 2018 and played an integral part during their 2018/2019 season. Timlin was out of contract the following summer and, for personal reasons, decided not to agree to an extension. Subsequently, Timlin re-signed for the club in September 2019 on a short-term contract playing under a different manager to his previous spell. In January 2020, Timlin signed for Ebbsfleet United however due to a transfer embargo in place on the club at the time, he was unable to make his debut until mid-February. As a result of the COVID-19 pandemic, the National League season was curtailed in April with Timlin having made just 4 league appearances. In August 2020 it was announced the midfielder had joined Dulwich Hamlet in a role combining playing for the first team and coaching in the academy.

Timlin has played internationally for the Republic of Ireland eight times at under-21 level.

== Club career ==
=== Fulham ===
Timlin joined the Fulham Academy at a young age and, with first team appearances being limited, he spent loan spells at Scunthorpe United, Doncaster Rovers and Swindon Town. After making his debut in a League Cup match against Boston United in 2004, Timlin only played a few competitive games (four in total). At the end of the 2007/2008 season Timlin agreed a permanent move to Swindon Town.

That debut season was otherwise one of frustration, as injuries to the back and metatarsal ruled the Irishman out for long periods. Having initially played as a winger while at the Fulham Academy, he has now matured into a central midfielder.

Timlin also captained the Ireland U-21s to victory in the 2006 Madeira Cup.

=== Swindon Town ===
In November 2006, he joined League Two promotion chasers Swindon Town. He made his debut for Swindon against Bury on 25 November. He scored his first goal for Swindon at home to Notts County, which earned them a point. Timlin's performances saw Paul Sturrock attempt to extend the loan deal. Chris Coleman agreed to the extension on the terms that Timlin extended his full contract with Fulham.

On 13 March 2008, Timlin rejoined Swindon on loan for the remainder of the season, making 10 appearances. On 3 May, hours after the conclusion of the 2007–08 League One season, it was announced that he had joined Swindon on a permanent two-year deal. He officially joined his new club on 1 July 2008. Ahead of the 2008–09 season, Timlin was given the number 4 shirt.

Timlin began the 2008/2009 season in his preferred central midfield role. However, Maurice Malpas took Timlin out for the visit of Leeds United, and on his return to the squad a week later, he appeared on the left side of midfield. Towards the end of October, when Malpas' defensive-minded approach hadn't appeared to work, Timlin was moved to yet another new position on the left side of the defence to fill the gap of injured Jamie Vincent. Adapting well, Timlin also stood in as captain in the absence of Hasney Aljofree. Maurice Malpas was sacked in November, and Timlin moved back to central midfield under caretaker manager David Byrne.

As Danny Wilson took charge, Timlin was playing at left side of defence again, but after Wilson's first game in charge, Timlin was moved to the left side of midfield and then back to central midfield. Timlin was ever-present in the centre of midfield for the remainder of the season, only missing two games through suspension. The 2009–10 season was frustrating for Timlin as he spent most of the season on the bench, during which time the club was making their attempt to reach the Championship, losing out to Millwall in the Playoff Final at Wembley. Despite a lack of first opportunities, Timlin signed a new one-year deal after being offered a new contract.

At the start of the 2010–11 season, Timlin appeared on the bench for a number of games before joining Southend United on loan. Upon his return from a loan spell with Southend United, Timlin made his first appearance since September, when Swindon Town played Brentford in the quarter final of Southern Section.

Timlin signed a two-year contract extension with Swindon on 23 June 2011. stating that he had never considered leaving the Robins despite recurring interest from Southend United. Ahead of the 2011–12 season, Timlin praised newly manager Paolo Di Canio for his influence. Despite signing the contract extension, Timlin re-joined Southend on loan again at the end of August 2011 which resulted in a permanent switch in January 2012.

=== Southend United ===
On 15 September 2010, Timlin joined League Two side Southend United on a one-month loan. Timlin made his debut on 25 September 2010, scoring his first goal from a 30-yard free-kick in a 3–1 win over Hereford United. Timlin made an impressive performance for Southend United and expressed an interest to extend his loan spell. Swindon Town initially agreed but later changed their mind and recalled him back to the club.

On 31 August 2011, Timlin re-joined Southend United on loan for a second spell, this time on a 4-month contract. His last match on loan to Southend was on Monday 2 January 2012 against Dagenham and Redbridge. In the evening of Thursday 5 January, three days after his loan spell came to an end, it was confirmed that he would be moving to Southend United permanently for an 'undisclosed fee'

On 5 February 2013, in a match against Leyton Orient, Timlin suffered a broken leg and was out of action for 8–9 months. He then missed the second leg of that game, the JPT Area Final, and the subsequent Wembley final. It was hoped that he would be back for the start of the next season 2013–14. Despite the injury, Timlin was offered, and signed, a new 2-year contract. He made his return from injury after appearing on the bench for three matches, when he came on as a substitute in the 83rd minute, in a 2–1 loss against Chesterfield on 24 August 2013. At the end of the 2014–15 season he played for Southend in the League Two play-off final against Wycombe Wanderers. Southend won in a penalty shoot-out and were promoted to League One.

On 2 July 2015 Timlin signed a new 2-year contract at Southend and then a further year extension which saw him contracted until May 2018.

At the end of the 2017/2018 season, Timlin held positive talks about a contract extension at Southend United but a change in circumstances at the club unfortunately resulted in him being released much to his disappointment and that of the clubs supporters with whom he was a fans favourite. Timlin went on to sign for Stevenage in June 2018.

=== Stevenage ===
Timlin signed for League Two club Stevenage on a free transfer on 11 June 2018. He made his Stevenage debut in the club's opening game of the 2018–19 season, playing the first 64 minutes in a 2–2 draw against Tranmere Rovers at Broadhall Way. Timlin scored his first goal for the club, which turned out to be his only goal for the club, in Stevenage's 1–0 victory over Morecambe on 18 August 2018. He played regularly throughout the season in the centre of midfield, making 46 appearances in all competitions. Timlin was released by Stevenage at the end of the season.

Timlin re-joined Stevenage on 20 September 2019 on a short-term contract. The club stated Timlin had previously chosen not to agree a new contract in the summer for personal reasons.

Stevenage confirmed in January 2020 that Timlin had left the club having been unable to agree terms on a new contract.

=== Ebbsfleet United ===
On 21 January 2020, Timlin signed for Ebbsfleet United however due to a transfer embargo in place on the club at the time, he was unable to make his debut until mid-February. As a result of the COVID-19 pandemic, the National League season was suspended and subsequently curtailed in April with Timlin having made just 4 league appearances. Whilst positive talks were held about Timlin remaining at Ebbsfleet, he explained during the summer that he had received an offer he just could not turn down which meant he would not be extending his time at the club. He said that had it not been for this specific offer, he would definitely have loved to remain at Ebbsfleet and finish his playing career with them.

=== Dulwich Hamlet ===
After a brief spell playing at Ebbsfleet United, cut short by the COVID-19 pandemic, Timlin agreed to sign for Dulwich Hamlet in August 2020 in a role that would allow him to continue playing and also continue his coaching ambitions working within their Academy. Timlin is keen to pass on his experience to the next generation of players and is working towards becoming a UEFA licensed coach. The midfielder explained, when signing for the club, that the opportunity to play for the team in the area he grew up in and work under good friends and mentors Gavin Rose and Junior Kadi, was just too good a chance to turn down.

== Personal life ==
On 5 June 2013, Timlin was sentenced to an 84-day prison sentence for perverting the course of justice in regards to traffic offences, although he was told he would only serve half. He was also given an £80 fine and four points on his driving license. On 17 July, Timlin was released from prison having served his 42 days. He linked up with the Southend squad to continue his rehabilitation on his broken leg and opened talks with manager Phil Brown about a new contract

== Career statistics ==
As of match played 2 May 2022

Appearances and goals by club, season and competition
Club	Season	League			FA Cup		League Cup		Other		Total	
Club	Season	Division	Apps	Goals	Apps	Goals	Apps	Goals	Apps	Goals	Apps	Goals
Fulham	2004–05	Premier League	0	0	0	0	1	0	—		1	0
Fulham	2005–06	Premier League	0	0	1	0	1	0	—		2	0
Fulham	2006–07	Premier League	0	0	0	0	1	0	—		1	0
Fulham	Total		0	0	1	0	3	0	0	0	4	0
Scunthorpe United (loan)	2005–06	League One	1	0	—		—		0	0	1	0
Doncaster Rovers (loan)	2005–06	League One	3	0	—		—		0	0	3	0
Swindon Town (loan)	2006–07	League Two	24	1	1	0	—		0	0	25	1
Swindon Town (loan)	2007–08	League One	10	1	0	0	0	0	0	0	10	1
Swindon Town	2008–09	League One	41	2	1	0	1	0	3 (Note: Appearances in the Football League Trophy)	0	46	2
Swindon Town	2009–10	League One	22	0	3	0	1	0	1	0	27	0
Swindon Town	2010–11	League One	22	2	3	0	0	0	2	0	27	2
Swindon Town	2011–12	League Two	1	0	0	0	0	0	0	0	1	0
Swindon Town	Total		86	4	7	0	2	0	6	0	101	4
Southend United (loan)	2010–11	League Two	8	1	0	0	0	0	0	0	8	1
Southend United	2011–12	League Two	39	4	4	0	0	0	4 (Note: Two appearances in the Football League Trophy and two in the League Two play-offs)	0	47	4
Southend United	2012–13	League Two	25	0	5	0	0	0	5	0	35	0
Southend United	2013–14	League Two	36	2	4	1	0	0	3 (Note: One appearance in the Football League Trophy and two in the League Two play-offs)	0	43	3
Southend United	2014–15	League Two	32	3	1	0	0	0	3 (Note: Appearances in the League Two play-offs)	1	36	4
Southend United	2015–16	League One	21	2	1	0	1	0	1	0	24	2
Southend United	2016–17	League One	27	1	0	0	0	0	2 (Note: Appearances in the EFL Trophy)	0	29	1
Southend United	2017–18	League One	34	0	1	0	1	0	3	0	39	0
Southend United	Total		214	12	16	1	2	0	21	1	253	14
Stevenage	2018–19	League Two	42	1	1	0	1	0	2	0	46	1
Stevenage	2019–20	League Two	13	0	2	0	0	0	3	0	18	0
Stevenage	Total		55	1	3	0	1	0	5	0	64	1
Ebbsfleet United	2019–20	National League	4	0	—		—		—		4	0
Dulwich Hamlet	2020–21	National League South	13	1	3	0	—		2 (Note: Appearance(s) in FA Trophy)	0	18	1
Dulwich Hamlet	2021–22	National League South	25	0	0	0	—		1 (Note: Appearance(s) in London Senior Cup)	0	26	0
Dulwich Hamlet	Total		38	1	3	0	0	0	3	0	44	1
Career total			443	21	31	1	8	0	35	1	517	23

== Honours ==
Southend United

- Football League Two play-offs: 2015
