= Jonathan Douglas =

Irish footballer (born 1981)

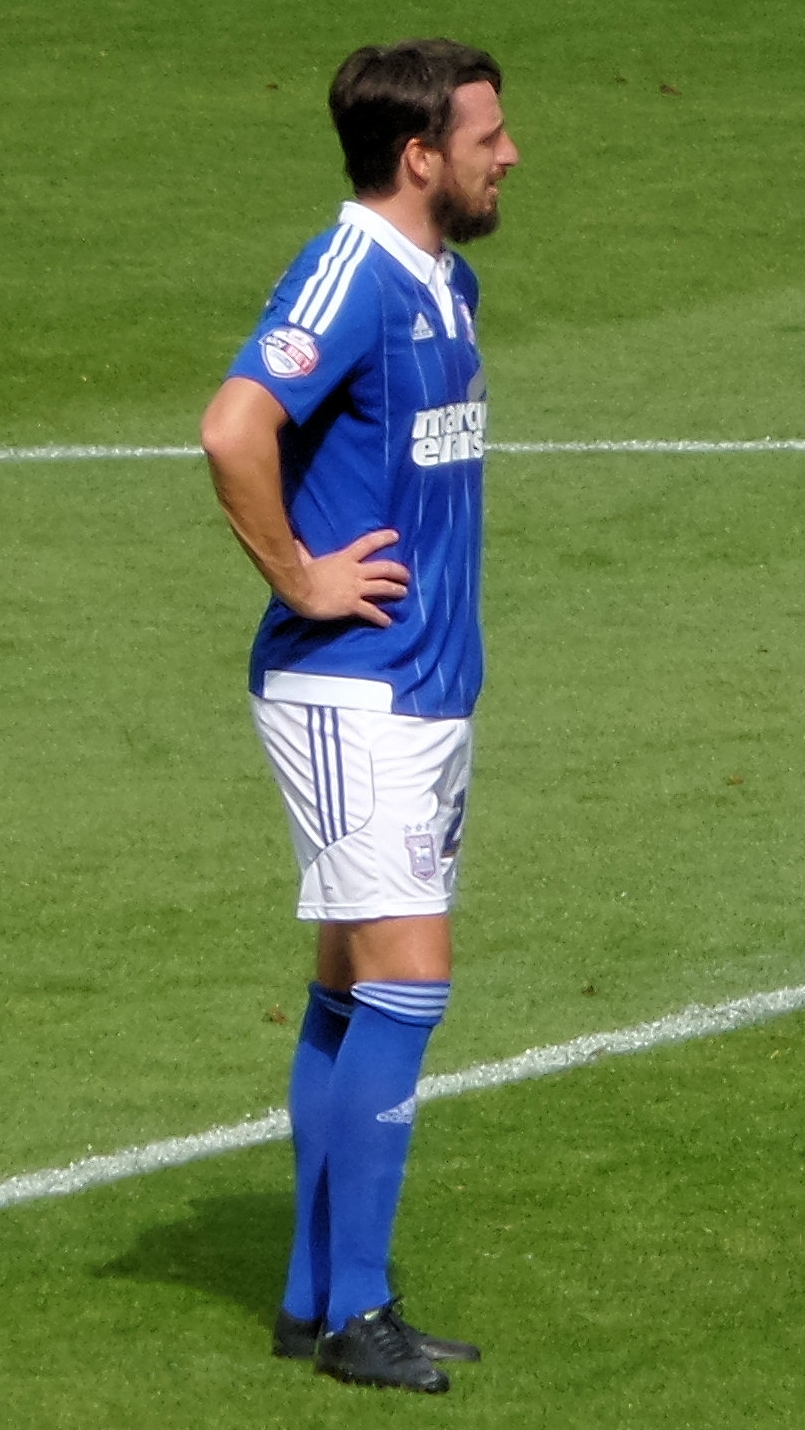
- Douglas playing for Ipswich Town in 2015

Personal information
- Full name: Jonathan Michael Douglas
- Date of birth: 22 November 1981 (age 44)
- Place of birth: Monaghan, Ireland
- Height: 5 ft 11 in (1.80 m)
- Position: Midfielder

Team information
- Current team: Clones Town (manager)

Youth career
- Lisnaskea Rovers
- –1997: Monaghan United
- 1997–2000: Blackburn Rovers

Senior career*
Years	Team	Apps	(Gls)
2000–2006	Blackburn Rovers	16	(1)
2002–2003	→ Chesterfield (loan)	7	(1)
2003–2004	→ Blackpool (loan)	16	(3)
2004–2005	→ Gillingham (loan)	10	(0)
2005–2006	→ Leeds United (loan)	40	(5)
2006–2009	Leeds United	104	(5)
2009–2011	Swindon Town	84	(1)
2011–2015	Brentford	169	(17)
2015–2017	Ipswich Town	59	(3)
2020–2021	Richmond & Kew	21	(1)
Total		505	(36)

International career
1998	Republic of Ireland U16	1	(0)
2004–2007	Republic of Ireland	8	(0)

Managerial career
- 2025–: Clones Town
Medal record
Men's football
Representing Republic of Ireland
UEFA European Under-16 Championship
Winner	1998 Scotland
- * Club domestic league appearances and goals as of 17:27, 11 October 2020 (UTC)

Jonathan Michael Douglas (born 22 November 1981) is an Irish football manager and former player who played as a midfielder. He has represented the Republic of Ireland at international level. He is currently manager of Monaghan Cavan League club Clones Town.

== Club career ==
=== Blackburn Rovers ===
Born in Monaghan, Douglas made his first team breakthrough at local club Monaghan United aged 16. He joined Blackburn Rovers after having been a trialist at Celtic and made his debut against West Ham United in the League Cup on 31 October 2000. A cruciate ligament injury in 2001 hampered his progress, and he was out for many months, managing to make it back in early 2002.

In March 2003, he was loaned to Chesterfield for six weeks, in which time he played seven matches and scored once against Blackpool. Ironically Blackpool were his next loan destination, joining them for three months, where he made a significant impact, playing in 16 league games and scoring three goals.

Despite being a tenacious central midfield, whose strengths focussed on energy and aggression rather than technical skill, Blackpool manager, Steve McMahon used the on-loan Douglas as an emergency left midfielder. This unexpected role was to prove a stroke of luck for Douglas. Not soon afterwards, Graeme Souness, manager of Blackburn Rovers, found his side struggling near the bottom of the Premier League and missing a left midfielder due to injuries and inadequate transfer dealings.

Jonathan Douglas was recalled by Rovers and promoted straight into the much re-jigged Rovers side, which adopted very defensive tactics to grind out results. The unheralded collaboration of Jonathan Douglas, Martin Andresen, Jonathan Stead, Lorenzo Amoruso and others, eventually proved successful in eking out results to guarantee Rovers safety in the Premier League. Douglas' first Blackburn goal, a spectacular volley, came during this time, in a 4–3 victory over Fulham.

Douglas had shown his potential as a utility squad player for Blackburn and Rovers awarded him a three-year contract.

However, manager Souness departed to Newcastle United and under new boss, Mark Hughes, Douglas soon fell down the pecking order and moved out on loan to Gillingham of the Championship, along with Rovers' youngster, Jay McEveley. Douglas was a regular in the side that so narrowly got relegated. However, he had once again impressed with his tenacious work-rate.

=== Leeds United ===
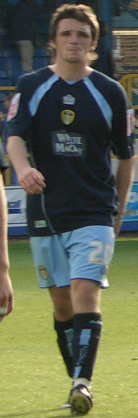
Douglas playing for Leeds United in 2005

On 19 August 2005, he joined Leeds United on a season-long loan. He became a regular player, making over 40 appearances for the club and scoring five goals in the process as Leeds reached the Championship playoff final but ended up losing 3–0 in the final against Watford. These performances impressed former manager Kevin Blackwell enough to make the move permanent, and on 31 August 2006, Douglas moved to Leeds permanently for an undisclosed fee, signing a three-year deal with the club. Douglas' performances impressed new manager Dennis Wise and kept him in the Leeds starting lineup. Douglas' only goal for the club that season came in the 2–1 victory against Coventry City.

After Leeds' captain, Kevin Nicholls requested a transfer to Luton Town, Douglas was made captain by Wise. He had played numerous matches as Leeds captain previously due to injuries to Nicholls, Shaun Derry and Gary Kelly. Douglas was forced to sit out the rest of the season when he received his 15th yellow card in the defeat at Colchester United. However, despite being stripped of the club captaincy, Douglas played regularly in the Leeds first team in the 2007–08 season. Despite rumours of a transfer to Burnley, Douglas stayed at Elland Road. On 28 October 2007 Leeds defeated Millwall 4–2 with Douglas grabbing his second brace for the Yorkshire club in his two years at the club. A serious leg injury late on at Walsall ruled Douglas out for much of the remainder of 2007–08, an injury which coincided with Leeds' dip in form after their astonishing start to life in League One, as Leeds struggled to replace the running power and positional sense of the injured Irishman.

He returned to the squad on 22 March, playing the last ten minutes of the match against Walsall, a match Leeds won 2–0. Leeds reached the playoff final against Doncaster Rovers but lost the game 1–0. After Leeds' failure to win promotion to the Championship, Douglas was again linked with a move to Burnley. He scored the first goal in Leeds' 4–0 romping of Crystal Palace in the second round of the League Cup and again in the 5–2 league defeat of Crewe Alexandra. Douglas' played in a more unfamiliar position of right back as Leeds reached the playoffs again, only to be knocked out the competition when they lost 2–1 on aggregate to Millwall.

On 21 May 2009 it was reported that Leeds would be offering him a new deal. However the following day it was reported by official club text that Douglas, along with goalkeeper David Lucas, had been released from the club. This seemed to be down to a difference of opinion between club and player of the valuation of his services.

=== Swindon Town ===
On 10 July 2009, Douglas signed for Swindon Town after being released from Leeds United. On 10 October 2009, Douglas was given a straight red card in a match against Millwall. Swindon felt the decision was unfair and prepared an appeal against the automatic three match ban for the dismissal. On 14 October the appeal was rejected and an extra one match ban added taking Douglas' suspension to four matches. This incited chairman Andrew Fitton to launch a scathing attack on The FA and its justice system. Douglas missed a home match with Hartlepool United, two away trips to Norwich City and Tranmere Rovers and the visit of Conference South side Woking in the FA Cup First Round. Douglas was part of the Swindon side which reached the League One playoffs. They won their playoff semi final after beating Charlton Athletic on penalties but were defeated by one goal to nil in the final at Wembley by Millwall. Douglas was later awarded both the club's Player of the year award and the club's Player's Player of the year award for the season 2009–10. Douglas scored with a volley into the top corner from 25 yards out against Sheffield Wednesday in a 3–1 defeat, his only goal for the club. However, Swindon were relegated to League Two after finishing bottom of the League One table in the 2010–11 season.

=== Brentford ===
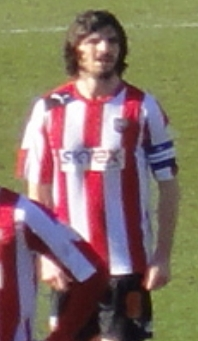
Douglas playing for Brentford in 2013

Douglas rejected an offer of a new contract at Swindon to sign for Brentford on 29 June 2011. At the start of the 2011/12, along with Richard Lee, he was named as a deputy to club captain Kevin O'Connor.

Douglas was named Brentford's Supporters' 'Player of the Year' for 2011/12, having only missed 26 minutes of Brentford's League One season, scoring two goals and providing the assist for four others.

In the 2012–13 season Douglas played 52 games in total, as Brentford missed out on promotion after a dramatic final game against Doncaster Rovers. With O'Connor and Lee being restricted to the bench Douglas started the season captaining the side on many occasions. He scored his first goal of the season in a 1–1 draw away to Walsall in September and he also scored away to Tranmere Rovers later that month. He also scored against Doncaster, and Carlisle United. He was a pivotal part during the 2013/14 season in earning the club promotion to The Championship, he also helped guide the club to The Championship playoffs during the 2014/15 season with Brentford missing out promotion to the Premier League after losing on aggregate to Middlesbrough.

=== Ipswich Town ===
On 4 August 2015, Douglas joined Ipswich Town on a two-year deal. His first goal arrived at Rotherham on 7 November in a 5–2 victory and Douglas followed that strike up in the next game at home to Wolves in a 2–2 stalemate. He also scored an overhead kick goal against QPR on Boxing Day 2015 in a 2–1 win. He was released by the club in the summer 2017.

== International career ==
Douglas has earned international caps for the Republic of Ireland at age group level and won his first senior cap against Poland on 28 April 2004. Having already featured in a number of friendlies, Douglas made his competitive debut for Ireland in the European Championship Qualifier against the Czech Republic on 11 October 2006, starting in central midfield alongside Lee Carsley. He also came on as a substitute in Ireland's next qualifier against San Marino. He was a regular choice in Steve Staunton's Republic of Ireland squad.

== Career statistics ==
=== Club ===
Appearances and goals by club, season and competition
Club	Season	League			FA Cup		League Cup		Other		Total	
Club	Season	Division	Apps	Goals	Apps	Goals	Apps	Goals	Apps	Goals	Apps	Goals
Blackburn Rovers	2000–01	First Division	0	0	1	0	1	0	—		2	0
Blackburn Rovers	2001–02	Premier League	0	0	1	0	0	0	—		1	0
Blackburn Rovers	2002–03	Premier League	1	0	3	0	1	0	—		5	0
Blackburn Rovers	2003–04	Premier League	14	1	0	0	0	0	—		14	1
Blackburn Rovers	2004–05	Premier League	1	0	0	0	1	0	—		2	0
Blackburn Rovers	2005–06	Premier League	0	0	0	0	0	0	—		0	0
Blackburn Rovers	Total		16	1	5	0	3	0	—		24	1
Chesterfield (loan)	2002–03	Second Division	7	1	0	0	0	0	0	0	7	1
Blackpool (loan)	2003–04	Second Division	16	3	0	0	3	0	1 (Note: Appearance(s) in Football League Trophy)	0	20	3
Gillingham (loan)	2004–05	Championship	10	0	0	0	0	0	—		10	0
Leeds United (loan)	2005–06	Championship	40	5	2	0	3	0	2 (Note: Appearances in Championship play-offs)	0	47	5
Leeds United	2006–07	Championship	35	1	0	0	2	0	—		37	1
Leeds United	2007–08	League One	26	3	1	0	2	0	2 (Note: One appearance in Football League Trophy, one appearance in League One play-offs)	0	31	3
Leeds United	2008–09	League One	43	1	3	0	3	1	2 (Note: Appearances in League One play-offs)	0	51	2
Leeds United	Total		144	10	6	0	10	1	6	0	166	11
Swindon Town	2009–10	League One	45	0	2	0	2	0	3 (Note: Two appearances in Football League Trophy, one appearance in League One play-offs)	0	52	0
Swindon Town	2010–11	League One	39	1	1	0	1	0	2	0	43	1
Swindon Town	Total		84	1	3	0	3	0	5	0	95	1
Brentford	2011–12	League One	46	2	1	0	1	0	3	0	51	2
Brentford	2012–13	League One	44	4	6	0	1	0	2	0	53	4
Brentford	2013–14	League One	35	3	1	0	0	0	1	0	37	3
Brentford	2014–15	Championship	44	8	0	0	0	0	2	0	46	8
Brentford	Total		169	17	8	0	2	0	8	0	187	17
Ipswich Town	2015–16	Championship	38	3	0	0	1	0	—		39	3
Ipswich Town	2016–17	Championship	21	0	1	0	1	0	—		23	0
Ipswich Town	Total		59	3	1	0	2	0	0	0	62	3
Richmond & Kew	2020–21	SSEC Intermediate Third Division	21	1	—		—		—		21	1
Career total			508	37	23	0	23	1	20	0	574	38

=== International ===
Appearances and goals by national team and year
National team	Year	Apps	Goals
Republic of Ireland	2004	2	0
Republic of Ireland	2006	3	0
Republic of Ireland	2007	3	0
Total		8	0

== Honours ==
Brentford

- Football League One promotion: 2013–14

Republic of Ireland U16

- UEFA European Under-16 Championships: 1998

Individual

- Swindon Town Supporters' Player of the Year: 2009–10
- Brentford Supporters' Player of the Year: 2011–12
