= Simon Cox (footballer, born 1987) =

Footballer (born 1987)

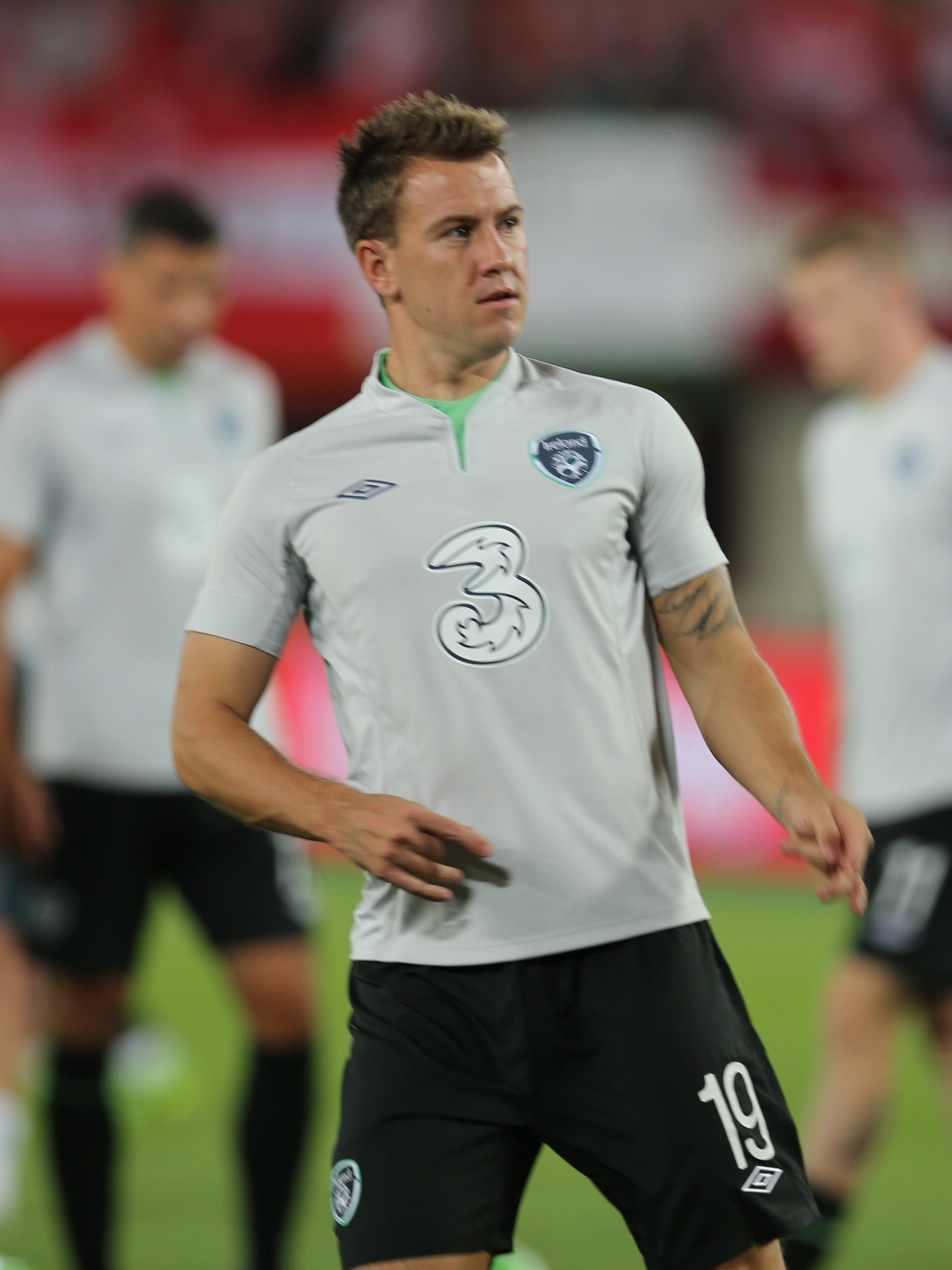
- Cox playing for the Republic of Ireland in 2013

Personal information
- Full name: Simon Richard Cox
- Date of birth: 28 April 1987 (age 39)
- Place of birth: Tilehurst, England
- Height: 5 ft 11 in (1.80 m)
- Position: Striker

Youth career
- 1996–2005: Reading

Senior career*
Years	Team	Apps	(Gls)
2005–2008	Reading	2	(0)
2006	→ Brentford (loan)	4	(0)
2006–2007	→ Brentford (loan)	9	(0)
2007	→ Northampton Town (loan)	8	(3)
2007–2008	→ Swindon Town (loan)	19	(8)
2008–2009	Swindon Town	62	(35)
2009–2012	West Bromwich Albion	65	(10)
2012–2014	Nottingham Forest	73	(13)
2014–2016	Reading	50	(9)
2015–2016	→ Bristol City (loan)	4	(0)
2016–2020	Southend United	150	(43)
2020–2021	Western Sydney Wanderers	27	(5)
Total		473	(126)

International career
2011–2014	Republic of Ireland	30	(4)
- * Club domestic league appearances and goals

Simon Richard Cox (born 28 April 1987) is a retired professional football player and Republic of Ireland international, who played as a striker.

Cox began his career at Reading. He has also played for Brentford, Northampton Town, Swindon Town, West Bromwich Albion, Nottingham Forest and Bristol City. He then returned to Reading for two seasons before his transfer to Southend United on a two-year deal in July 2016. In 2020, Cox joined Western Sydney Wanderers before announcing his retirement in October 2021.

== Club career ==
=== Early years ===
Born in the Reading suburb of Tilehurst, he attended Downsway Primary School and Denefield School. Cox joined his home town club, Reading, at the age of nine.

=== Reading ===
Cox made his first team debut for Reading on 20 September 2005 in their League Cup victory away at Luton Town, and accepted a professional contract with Reading on 18 November 2005.

On 11 September 2006, Cox went on loan to Brentford. He made five appearances there, including four in League One, before the loan was cut short due to a broken leg suffered against Millwall on 26 September 2006. He resumed his loan with Brentford on 22 November 2006 following his recovery from the broken leg, and returned to Reading on 8 January 2007.

His third loan period of the 2006–07 season started on 22 March 2007. This time he joined fellow Reading loanee Alex Pearce at Northampton Town for a month, which was later extended until the end of the season.

On 4 July 2007, Cox signed a new one-year contract to keep him at Reading for the 2007–08 season. On 16 July 2007, he scored the only goal of a Peace Cup game against five-time French Champions Olympique Lyonnais.

Cox joined Swindon Town in a six-month loan deal on 31 August 2007. On his return from loan he played in the FA Cup fourth round replay against Tottenham Hotspur on 15 January 2008 at the Madejski Stadium, with the new England manager Fabio Capello in the stands. Cox came on to play right wing in the second half.

=== Swindon Town ===
On 31 January 2008, Cox moved to Swindon on a full-time basis. The fee was not disclosed, but was thought to be £150,000. The deal was finalised just three hours before the close of the transfer window. He made his debut for Swindon as a permanent signing in a 1–0 defeat away to Huddersfield Town on 9 February 2008. He scored his first goal in the following game, a 3–0 home victory over Cheltenham Town. He went on to score three hat-tricks for Swindon, all away from home, against Hartlepool United, Scunthorpe United and Northampton Town. Cox scored 29 League goals in the 2008–09 season, making him joint top scorer (along with Bristol Rovers' Rickie Lambert) in the top four divisions of English football.

Cox was attracting attention from other clubs, with Swindon expecting bids to come in for the player. Sure enough, in May 2009, Swindon rejected two bids for Cox, one of which was made by Leicester City (the other club being unnamed).

=== West Bromwich Albion ===
On 8 July 2009, Cox signed for West Bromwich Albion, on a two-year contract, for an initial fee of £1.5 million. He made his debut for West Brom exactly a month later, in the opening game of the 2009–10 season, a 1–1 draw at home to Newcastle United (replacing Chris Wood in the 81st minute). He scored his first goal for Albion on 26 August; it was the winner in a 4–3 victory over Rotherham United in the League Cup, coming four minutes from the end of extra time. In his first season at West Brom, he made 34 appearances and scored 10 goals, six of which came in a seven-game spell between 31 October and 14 December 2009.

In the early weeks of the 2010–11 season, following Albion's promotion, Cox was restricted to two substitute appearances in the Premier League and started only in the League Cup. He scored the winning goal in a 2–1 victory over Manchester City in the third round, and in the fourth round he scored two goals in a 4–1 win over Leicester City. He was rewarded with his first Premier League start in Albion's next game, on 1 November 2010, against Blackpool, but he was substituted in the 12th minute after West Brom had a player sent off. Albion lost the match 2–1. He scored his first Premier League goal against Tottenham Hotspur on 23 April 2011 – an 81st-minute equaliser, just four minutes after replacing Paul Scharner. The goal was featured as one of BBC Match of the Day's goals of the month. Cox started each of Albion's next three Premier League games, taking a more creative position behind the main striker.

During the 2011–12 season, Cox was not a first team regular and, in April 2012, he said he wanted talks with the club about his future in the summer.

=== Nottingham Forest ===
On 11 August 2012, Cox joined Nottingham Forest for an undisclosed fee, signing a three-year contract. The transfer fee was reported to be £2 million. He became Forest's seventh signing in the summer transfer window. Cox scored his first goal for the club in the 1–1 draw away against Huddersfield Town on 21 August 2012. He scored his second goal in a 4–1 defeat in League Cup against Premier League club Wigan Athletic with a strike described by the Daily Express as 'spectacular'.

Cox started the first game of the 2013–14 season against Huddersfield Town, however picked up an injury in the second: a Football League Cup first round win over Hartlepool United.

=== Return to Reading ===
On 7 August 2014, Cox was officially unveiled as Reading's first signing of the season. The signing saw him return to the club where he spent his youth and the start of his professional career. He signed for £600,000 on a two-year contract. He scored his first goal for Reading against Huddersfield Town.

On 9 October 2015, Cox joined Championship rivals Bristol City on loan until the beginning of January 2016. On 2 January 2016, following Bristol City's defeat to Reading, they confirmed the Cox had returned to his parent club.

Reading announced on 9 May 2016, that Cox would leave Reading when his contract expired at the end of June 2016.

=== Southend United ===
On 16 July 2016, Southend United announced the signing of Cox on a two-year deal after he committed his future to the Shrimpers until at least the summer of 2018.

Southend United's Phil Brown is quoted as saying "Signing someone of Simon's pedigree is fantastic, we have been working long & hard towards this signing and I can't thank the Chairman enough for pushing this through, it's a real coup for the Club".

Cox scored his first goal for the club in a 3–0 win away at Sheffield United on 16 August 2016.

On 26 June 2018, he signed a new contract at Southend.

=== Western Sydney Wanderers ===
On 16 January 2020, Western Sydney Wanderers signed Cox to play in the A-League, joining on a one-and-a-half-year deal. In early 2020 he failed to score from very close range when Melbourne City FC centre-back Curtis Good made a tackle to block the ball.

On 15 October 2021, Cox announced his retirement from professional football, and his desire to move into coaching and management.

== International career ==
Cox is eligible to play for the Republic of Ireland through his Irish-born grandmother. He was first called up to the Republic of Ireland squad by Giovanni Trapattoni on 5 May 2011, as a replacement for Damien Duff. Cox made his international debut on 24 May 2011 in the 2011 Nations Cup game against Northern Ireland, when he scored the fifth goal in a 5–0 victory. He went on to win four caps in the next two weeks, and scored his second international goal in a 2–0 friendly defeat of Italy in Liège on 7 June 2011. On 11 October 2011, he played and received the "Man of the Match" award in the game against Armenia, helping secure his team a place in the play-offs for UEFA Euro 2012. While there was some controversy over his goal, replays clearly showed the ball touched his chest and never touched his hands. He scored the equaliser in the 1–1 friendly against the Czech Republic at the Aviva Stadium on 29 February 2012. Cox was selected in Trapattoni's 23-man squad for the UEFA Euro 2012. He scored his fourth goal for Ireland in a 4–0 win over Georgia on 2 June 2013.

== Career statistics ==
=== Club ===
Appearances and goals by club, season and competition
Club	Season	League			National cup		League cup		Other		Total	
Club	Season	Division	Apps	Goals	Apps	Goals	Apps	Goals	Apps	Goals	Apps	Goals
Reading	2005–06	Championship	2	0	2	0	2	0	—		6	0
Reading	2006–07	Premier League	0	0	1	0	0	0	—		1	0
Reading	2007–08	Premier League	0	0	1	0	1	0	—		2	0
Reading	Total		2	0	4	0	3	0	—		9	0
Brentford (loan)	2006–07	League One	13	0	0	0	1	0	0	0	14	0
Northampton Town (loan)	2006–07	League One	8	3	0	0	0	0	0	0	8	3
Swindon Town	2007–08	League One	36	14	0	0	0	0	2 (Note: Appearances in EFL Trophy)	1	38	15
Swindon Town	2008–09	League One	45	29	1	0	1	1	3	2	50	32
Swindon Town	Total		81	43	1	0	1	1	5	3	88	47
West Bromwich Albion	2009–10	Championship	28	9	3	0	3	1	—		34	10
West Bromwich Albion	2010–11	Premier League	19	1	0	0	4	3	—		23	4
West Bromwich Albion	2011–12	Premier League	18	0	2	3	2	1	—		22	4
West Bromwich Albion	Total		65	10	5	3	9	5	—		79	18
Nottingham Forest	2012–13	Championship	39	5	1	0	1	1	—		41	6
Nottingham Forest	2013–14	Championship	34	8	4	0	3	0	—		41	8
Nottingham Forest	Total		73	13	5	0	4	1	—		82	14
Reading	2014–15	Championship	37	8	3	0	3	0	—		43	8
Reading	2015–16	Championship	13	1	2	0	2	0	—		17	1
Reading	Total		50	9	5	0	5	0	—		60	9
Bristol City (loan)	2015–16	Championship	4	0	0	0	0	0	—		4	0
Southend United	2016–17	League One	44	16	1	0	1	0	4	0	50	16
Southend United	2017–18	League One	42	10	1	0	1	0	3	0	47	10
Southend United	2018–19	League One	45	15	3	2	1	0	2	0	51	17
Southend United	2019–20	League One	19	2	1	0	2	0	2	0	24	2
Southend United	Total		150	43	6	2	5	0	11	0	172	45
Western Sydney Wanderers	2019–20	A-League	12	3	0	0	—		—		12	3
Western Sydney Wanderers	2020–21	A-League	15	2	0	0	—		—		15	2
Western Sydney Wanderers	Total		27	5	0	0	—		—		27	5
Career total			473	126	26	5	28	7	16	3	443	141

=== International ===
Appearances and goals by national team and year
National team	Year	Apps	Goals
Republic of Ireland	2011	10	2
Republic of Ireland	2012	11	1
Republic of Ireland	2013	6	1
Republic of Ireland	2014	3	0
Total		30	4

Scores and results list the Republic of Ireland's goal tally first, score column indicates score after each Cox goal.

List of international goals scored by Simon Cox
No.	Date	Venue	Opponent	Score	Result	Competition
1	24 May 2011	Aviva Stadium, Dublin	Northern Ireland	5–0	5–0	2011 Nations Cup
2	7 June 2011	Stade Maurice Dufrasne, Liège	Italy	2–0	2–0	Friendly
3	29 February 2012	Aviva Stadium, Dublin	Czech Republic	1–1	1–1	Friendly
4	2 June 2013	Aviva Stadium, Dublin	Georgia	2–0	4–0	Friendly

== Honours ==
Republic of Ireland

- Nations Cup: 2011

Individual

- Swindon Town Player of the Season: 2008–09

== See also ==
- List of Republic of Ireland international footballers born outside the Republic of Ireland
