= 2008–09 Swindon Town F.C. season =

Swindon Town
2008–09 season
- Chairman: Andrew Fitton
- Manager: Maurice Malpas (until 14 November); David Byrne (as caretaker, from 14 November until 26 December); Danny Wilson (from 26 December)
- Ground: County Ground, Swindon
- League One: 15th
- FA Cup: 1st round
- League Cup: 1st round
- FL Trophy: Quarter-finals (South)
- Top goalscorer: League: Simon Cox (29); All: Simon Cox (32)
- Highest home attendance: 13,001 (vs. Leeds United)
- Lowest home attendance: 6,002 (vs. Stockport County)
Home colours	Away colours	Third colours

The 2008–09 season was Swindon Town's second season in the League One since their relegation from the division in 2006. Alongside the league campaign, Swindon Town also competed in the FA Cup, League Cup and the Football League Trophy.

== Football League One ==
Leicester comfortably won promotion in their first-ever season at this level, leading the table for virtually the entire season, going half the season (23 consecutive games) unbeaten and losing just 4 games in the process, Nigel Pearson brought stability to the club in becoming their first manager in five years to last an entire season as they looked to turn the corner after several years of struggle. Peterborough were runners-up, winning their second successive promotion and entering the second tier for only the second time in their history. Scunthorpe grabbed the final play-off place on the last day of the season in a winner takes all match v 7th place Tranmere Rovers and won promotion through them, making an immediate return to the Championship after being relegated the previous year.

Stockport went into administration before the final match of the season and so suffered a 10-point penalty; however, there was no real chance of them being relegated as a result of this penalty, barring an extremely unlikely set of results on the final day.

Hereford made an immediate return to League Two, finishing bottom in their first campaign at this level for thirty years. Cheltenham improved late in the season, but it proved too late to prevent relegation. Crewe suffered a late collapse and went down to League Two, having looked safe a few weeks previously, while Northampton were undone by other results going against them on the final day of the season.

=== Table ===
Pos	Team	Pld	W	D	L	GF	GA	GD	Pts
13	Walsall	46	17	10	19	61	66	−5	61
14	Leyton Orient	46	15	11	20	45	57	−12	56
15	Swindon Town	46	12	17	17	68	71	−3	53
16	Brighton & Hove Albion	46	13	13	20	55	70	−15	52
17	Yeovil Town	46	12	15	19	41	66	−25	51

Updated to match(es) played on 2 May 2009. Source: The Football League
Rules for classification: 1) points; 2) goal difference; 3) number of goals scored.

== Results ==
=== Legend ===
Win	Draw	Loss

=== League One ===
Date	Opponent	Venue	Result F–A	Scorers	Attendance	Ref.
9 August 2008	Tranmere Rovers	H	3–1	Paynter 5', Cox 37', McGovern 51'	7,975	
16 August 2008	Cheltenham Town	A	0–2		4,975	
23 August 2008	Colchester United	H	1–3	Cox 67' pen.	7,031	
30 August 2008	Milton Keynes Dons	A	2–1	Paynter 52', Cox 90' pen.	8,846	
5 September 2008	Hereford United	A	1–1	Ifil 45'	4,061	
13 September 2008	Leeds United	H	1–3	Cox 45'	13,001	
20 September 2008	Stockport County	A	1–1	Easton 49'	5,536	
28 September 2008	Millwall	H	1–2	J. Smith 47'	7,589	
3 October 2008	Hartlepool United	A	3–3	Cox 5', 39', 52'	4,018	
11 October 2008	Huddersfield Town	H	1–3	Easton 88'	7,071	
18 October 2008	Southend United	A	1–2	Paynter 60'	7,965	
21 October 2008	Northampton Town	H	2–1	Paynter 48', Cox 61'	6,653	
25 October 2008	Oldham Athletic	H	2–0	Morrison 25', J. Smith 34' pen.	6,756	
1 November 2008	Scunthorpe United	A	3–3	Cox 15', 52', 80' pen.	4,744	
15 November 2008	Leicester City	H	2–2	Cox 84', Corr 86'	9,499	
22 November 2008	Bristol Rovers	A	2–2	Kanyuka 39', Corr 53'	8,016	
25 November 2008	Peterborough United	H	2–2	J. Smith 10', Cox 81'	6,616	
29 November 2008	Walsall	A	1–2	Paynter 90'	3,844	
6 December 2008	Carlisle United	H	1–1	Murphy 50' o.g.	6,787	
13 December 2008	Crewe Alexandra	A	0–1		3,941	
20 December 2008	Yeovil Town	H	2–3	Timlin 45', McGovern 47'	7,072	
26 December 2008	Leyton Orient	A	2–1	Peacock 1', J. Smith 61' pen.	4,349	
28 December 2008	Brighton & Hove Albion	H	0–2		8,438	
13 January 2009	Stockport County	H	1–1	J. Smith 62'	6,002	
17 January 2009	Huddersfield Town	A	1–2	Cox 90'	13,414	
27 January 2009	Walsall	H	3–2	Amankwaah 8', Cox 29', Paynter 49'	6,100	
31 January 2009	Oldham Athletic	A	0–0		4,712	
14 February 2009	Leicester City	A	1–1	Cox 38'	19,926	
17 February 2009	Millwall	A	1–1	Paynter 43'	7,104	
21 February 2009	Scunthorpe United	H	4–2	Timlin 62', Wright 71' o.g., Robson-Kanu 82', Peacock 85'	6,852	
24 February 2009	Hartlepool United	H	0–1		6,010	
28 February 2009	Tranmere Rovers	A	0–1		5,153	
3 March 2009	Cheltenham Town	H	2–2	Robson-Kanu 32', Amankwaah 66'	6,293	
7 March 2009	Milton Keynes Dons	H	1–1	Paynter 18'	7,453	
10 March 2009	Colchester United	A	2–3	Cox 38' pen., Robson-Kanu 64'	3,827	
14 March 2009	Leeds United	A	0–1		21,765	
17 March 2009	Southend United	H	3–0	Robson-Kanu 13', Cox 19' pen., 90' pen.	6,269	
21 March 2009	Hereford United	H	3–0	Cox 29', 46', Paynter 76'	7,129	
24 March 2009	Northampton Town	A	4–3	Cox 18', 31', 79', Paynter 40'	5,025	
28 March 2009	Yeovil Town	A	0–1		5,476	
4 April 2009	Crewe Alexandra	H	0–0		7,165	
11 April 2009	Brighton & Hove Albion	A	3–2	Greer 47', Paynter 50', Cox 58'	6,549	
13 April 2009	Leyton Orient	H	0–1		7,735	
18 April 2009	Carlisle United	A	1–1	Tudur Jones 90'	5,959	
25 April 2009	Bristol Rovers	H	2–1	Cox 4', 81'	10,977	
2 May 2009	Peterborough United	A	2–2	Cox 17', 42'	10,886	

=== FA Cup ===
Round	Date	Opponent	Venue	Result F–A	Scorers	Attendance	Ref.
First round	8 November 2008	Histon	A	0–1		1,541	

=== League Cup ===
Round	Date	Opponent	Venue	Result F–A	Scorers	Attendance	Ref.
First round	12 August 2008	Queens Park Rangers	H	2–3	Cox 34', Paynter 41'	7,230	

=== Football League Trophy ===
Round	Date	Opponent	Venue	Result F–A	Scorers	Attendance	Ref.
First round	2 September 2008	Aldershot Town	A	2–2; 7–6 p	Cox 32', Ifil 83'	1,814	
Second round	7 October 2008	Hereford United	A	2–1	Cox 45', Peacock 84'	1,458	
Third round	12 November 2008	Brighton & Hove Albion	A	0–2		2,234	
