= 2007–08 Swindon Town F.C. season =

Swindon Town
2007–08 season
- Chairman: Willie Carson; Jim Little (designate); Andrew Fitton
- Manager: Paul Sturrock (until 27 November); David Byrne (as caretaker, from 27 November until 15 January); Maurice Malpas (from 15 January)
- Ground: County Ground, Swindon
- League One: 13th
- FA Cup: Third round
- League Cup: First round
- FL Trophy: Second round (S-W)
- Top goalscorer: League: Simon Cox (15); All: Simon Cox (16)
- Highest home attendance: 13,270 (vs. Leeds United)
- Lowest home attendance: 3,118 (vs. Brentford)
Home colours	Away colours	Third colours

The 2007–08 season was Swindon Town's first season in the League One since their relegation from the division in 2006. Alongside the league campaign, Swindon Town also competed in the FA Cup, League Cup and the Football League Trophy.

== Competitions ==
=== League One ===
==== League table ====
Pos	Team	Pld	W	D	L	GF	GA	GD	Pts
11	Tranmere Rovers	46	18	11	17	52	47	+5	65
12	Walsall	46	16	16	14	52	46	+6	64
13	Swindon Town	46	16	13	17	63	56	+7	61
14	Leyton Orient	46	16	12	18	49	63	−14	60
15	Hartlepool United	46	15	9	22	62	65	−3	54

Updated to match(es) played on 3 May 2008. Source: The Football League
Rules for classification: 1) points; 2) goal difference; 3) number of goals scored.

==== Matches ====
League One match details
Date	Opponent	Venue	Result F–A	Scorers	Attendance	Ref.
11 August 2007	Northampton Town	A	1–1	Roberts 44' pen.	6,210	
18 August 2007	Luton Town	H	2–1	Peacock 56', Easton 88'	7,520	
25 August 2007	Cheltenham Town	A	1–1	Sturrock 35'	5,442	
1 September 2007	Crewe Alexandra	H	1–1	Pook 24'	6,595	
9 September 2007	Yeovil Town	H	0–1		6,944	
15 September 2007	Hartlepool United	A	1–1	McGovern 31'	4,943	
22 September 2007	AFC Bournemouth	H	4–1	Cox 7', Paynter 48', 64', 85'	6,668	
29 September 2007	Millwall	A	2–1	Cox 8', Ifil 79'	8,744	
2 October 2007	Swansea City	A	1–2	Roberts 70'	10,135	
6 October 2007	Gillingham	H	5–0	McGovern 4', Cox 6', Paynter 52', Cox 62', Paynter 84'	6,345	
20 October 2007	Tranmere Rovers	H	1–0	Corr 88'	6,430	
27 October 2007	Port Vale	A	1–2	Peacock 19'	4,013	
3 November 2007	Doncaster Rovers	H	1–2	Stock 31', Guy 73'	6,517	
6 November 2007	Leyton Orient	H	1–1	Boyd 87'	5,874	
17 November 2007	Leeds United	A	1–2	Peacock 47'	27,990	
24 November 2007	Bristol Rovers	H	1–0	Roberts 67' pen.	9,342	
4 December 2007	Carlisle United	A	0–3		5,477	
8 December 2007	Southend United	A	1–2	Cox 2'	7,403	
15 December 2007	Brighton & Hove Albion	H	0–3		6,415	
22 December 2007	Hartlepool United	H	2–1	Cox 49', Corr 73' pen.	5,875	
26 December 2007	Yeovil Town	A	1–0	Corr 66'	6,539	
29 December 2007	AFC Bournemouth	A	2–2	Corr 49', 83'	6,540	
1 January 2008	Swansea City	H	1–1	Cox 90' pen.	9,426	
12 January 2008	Walsall	A	2–2	Nicholas 65', Easton 67'	5,449	
19 January 2008	Nottingham Forest	H	2–1	Perch 35' o.g., Breckin 82' o.g.	9,815	
26 January 2008	Crewe Alexandra	A	0–0		4,344	
29 January 2008	Luton Town	A	1–0	Roberts 52'	5,738	
2 February 2008	Northampton Town	H	1–1	Sturrock 56'	7,375	
9 February 2008	Huddersfield Town	A	0–1		9,388	
12 February 2008	Cheltenham Town	H	3–0	Cox 20', Paynter 41', Roberts 80'	6,483	
16 February 2008	Nottingham Forest	A	0–1		23,439	
23 February 2008	Walsall	H	0–3		6,265	
26 February 2008	Oldham Athletic	A	2–2	Peacock 29', 58'	3,923	
1 March 2008	Leeds United	H	0–1		13,270	
4 March 2008	Huddersfield Town	H	3–2	Paynter 4', Easton 23', 31'	4,840	
11 March 2008	Leyton Orient	A	1–2	Thelwell 20' o.g.	3,082	
15 March 2008	Carlisle United	H	2–2	Cox 61', Sturrock 80'	6,004	
22 March 2008	Brighton & Hove Albion	A	1–2	Easton 8'	6,849	
24 March 2008	Southend United	H	0–1		6,378	
28 March 2008	Tranmere Rovers	A	1–2	Jarrett 52'	8,777	
5 April 2008	Oldham Athletic	H	3–0	Peacock 49', Cox 53', 70'	5,384	
11 April 2008	Doncaster Rovers	A	0–2		8,371	
19 April 2008	Port Vale	H	6–0	Peacock 16, Easton 21, Jack Smith 33, Timlin 45, McNamee 45, Joyce 90'	7,361	
22 April 2008	Bristol Rovers	A	1–0	Cox 74'	6,102	
26 April 2008	Gillingham	A	1–1	Aljofree 88'	6,334	
3 May 2008	Millwall	H	2–1	Cox 31' pen., McNamee 51'	7,781	

=== FA Cup ===
FA Cup match details
Round	Date	Opponent	Venue	Result F–A	Scorers	Attendance	Ref.
First round	10 November 2007	Wycombe Wanderers	A	2–1	Roberts 66', Paynter 72'	3,332	
Second round	1 December 2007	Forest Green Rovers	H	3–2	McGovern 12', Aljofree 69', Sturrock 88'	7,588	
Third round	5 January 2008	Barnet	H	1–1	Sturrock 60'	5,944	
Third round replay	22 January 2008	Barnet	A	1–1 (0–2 p)	Paynter 42'	2,810	

=== League Cup ===
League Cup match details
Round	Date	Opponent	Venue	Result F–A	Scorers	Attendance	Ref.
First round	14 August 2007	Charlton Athletic	H	0–2		6,175	

=== Football League Trophy ===
Football League Trophy match details
Round	Date	Opponent	Venue	Result F–A	Scorers	Attendance	Ref.
First round	4 September 2007	Brentford	H	4–1	Arrieta 26', Cox 42', Blackburn 68', 81'	3,118	
Second round	9 October 2007	Cheltenham Town	H	1–3	Sturrock 56'	3,765	
