= 2013–14 Swindon Town F.C. season =

Swindon Town
2013–14 season
- Chairman: Jed McCrory (until November); Lee Power (from November)
- Manager: Kevin MacDonald (until 13 July); Mark Cooper (from 20 August)
- Ground: County Ground
- League One: 8th
- FA Cup: First round (Knocked out by Macclesfield Town)
- League Cup: Third round (Knocked out by Chelsea)
- Football League Trophy: Area Finalists (Lost to Peterborough United)
Home colours	Away colours

The 2013–14 season was Swindon Town's second consecutive season in the League One since gaining promotion from League Two in 2012.

Alongside the league campaign, Swindon also competed in the FA Cup, League Cup and the Johnstone's Paint Trophy. The 2013–14 campaign was scheduled to be Kevin MacDonald's first full season as manager of Swindon Town after replacing Paolo Di Canio in February 2012 but the Scotsman resigned during pre-season.

== Chronological list of media reports ==
=== Early news ===
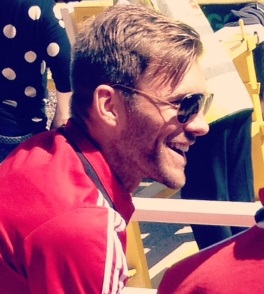
Club captain Darren Ward rejected a move to Brentford.

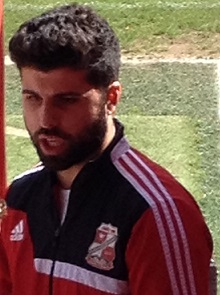
Yaser Kasim joined upon his release from Brighton.

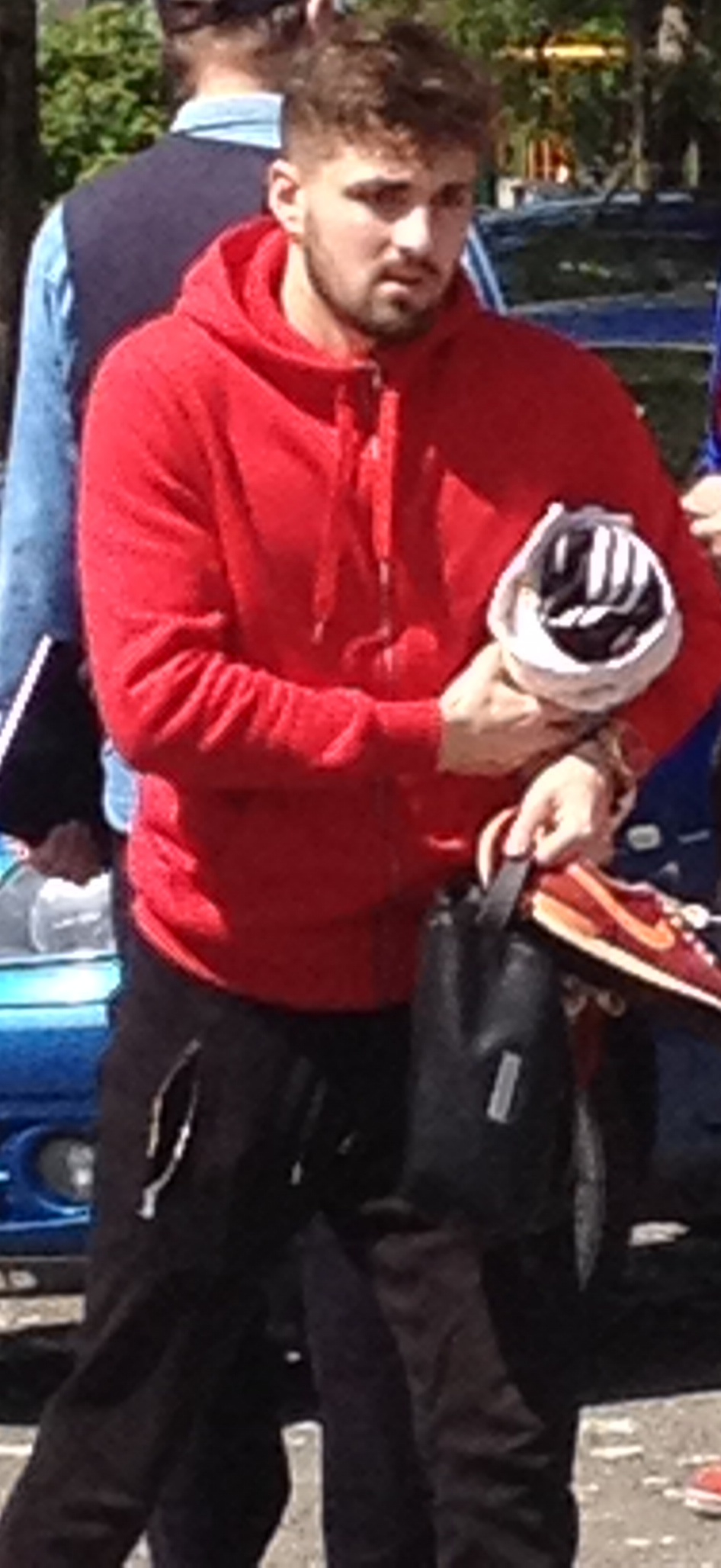
Youth graduate Mark Francis signed a pro contract in 2013.

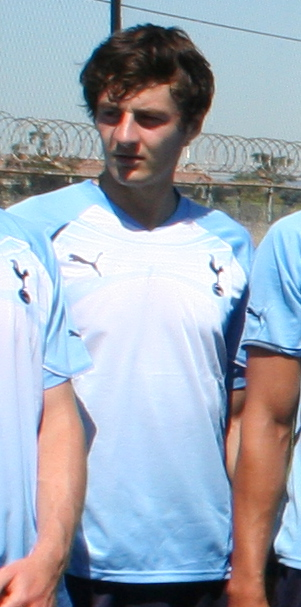
Ryan Mason joined the club on a season-long loan in July.

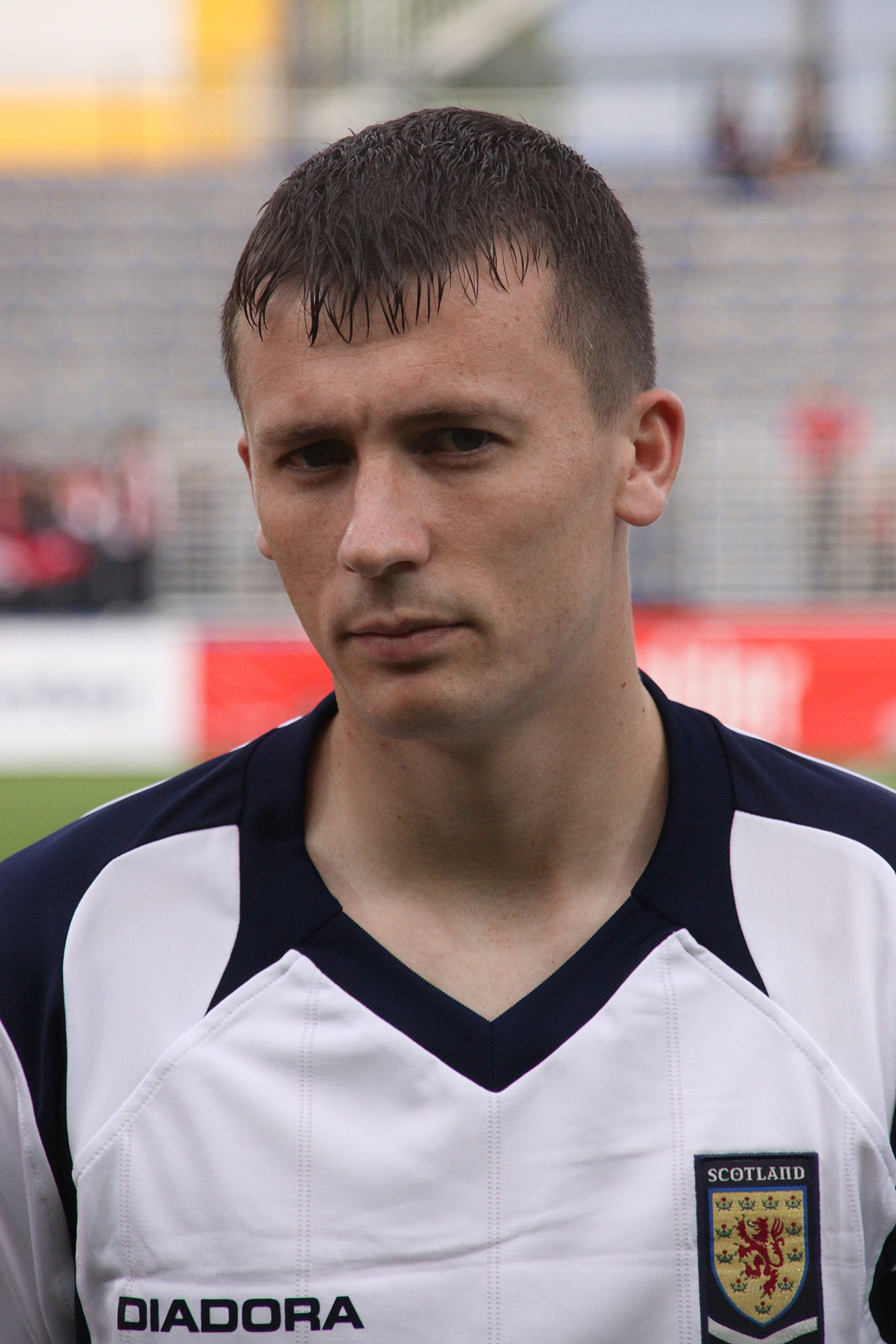
Swindon Town spent much of pre-season trying to sell former captain Paul Caddis after he returned from a loan spell at Birmingham City.

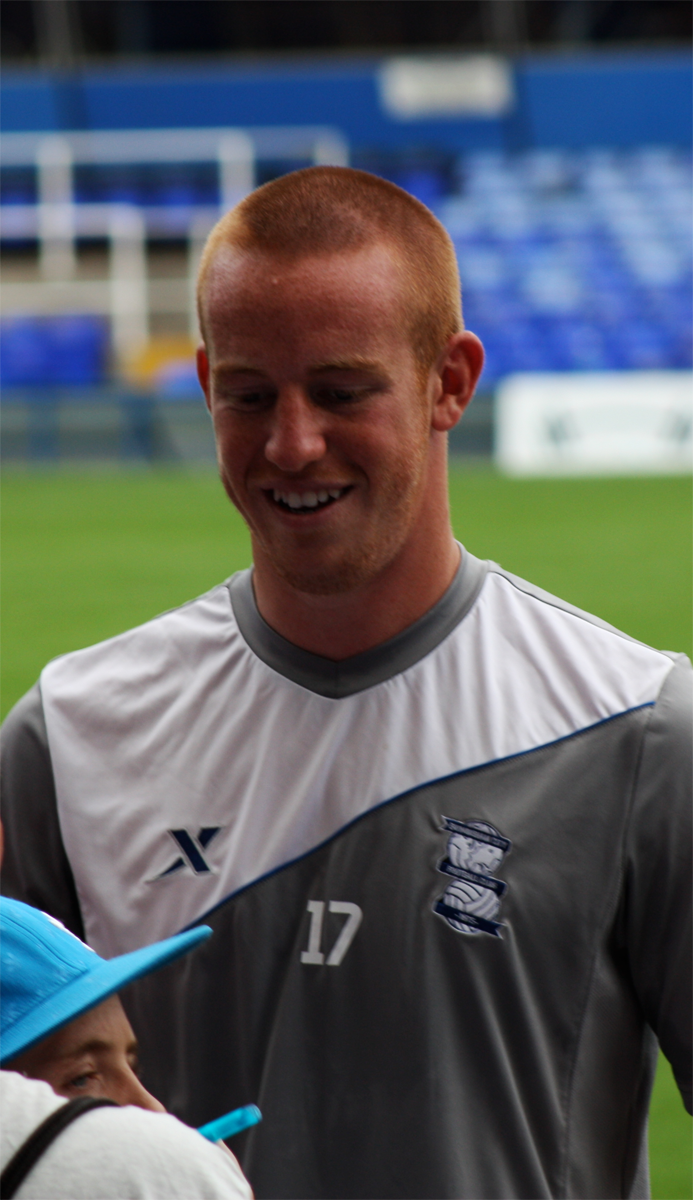
Former loan player Adam Rooney was scheduled to join Swindon but entered a contract dispute with the club. He would spend pre-season and later join Oldham Athletic.

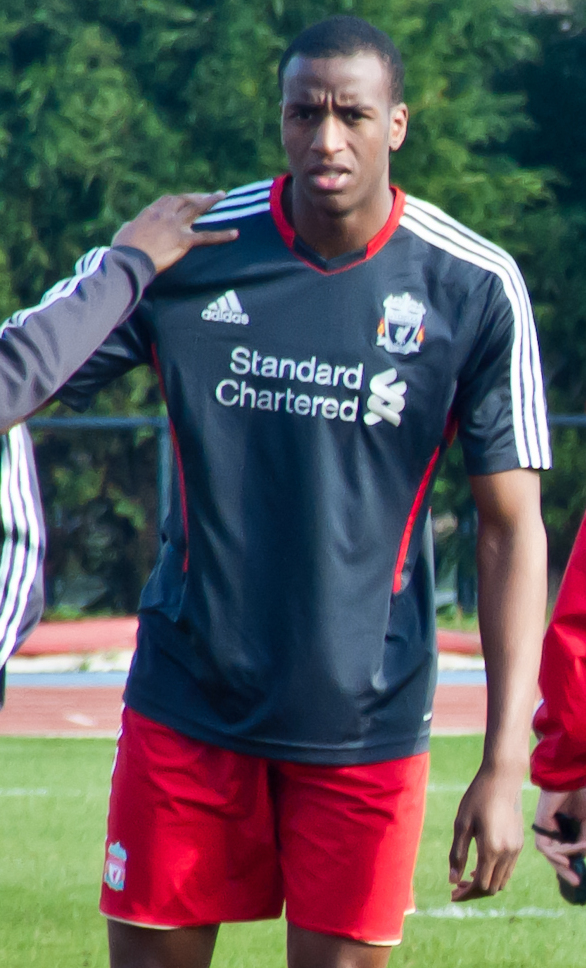
Michael Ngoo was linked with a loan move in January.

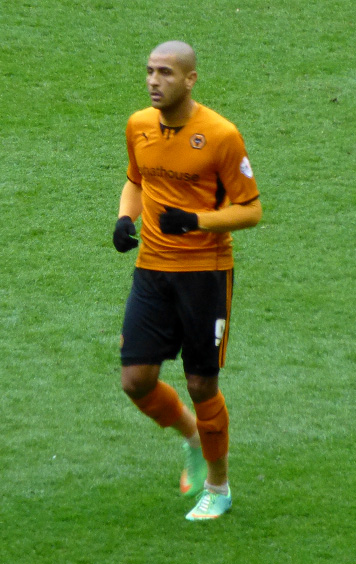
Former Town forward Leon Clarke was briefly linked with a return to the club.

- 7 April 2013: Kayden Jackson wins the Samsung Win a Pro Contact competition. The one-year deal is scheduled to begin in the Summer of 2013.
- 26 April 2013: The BBC report that Tottenham Hotspur youngster Nathan Byrne has agreed a permanent deal with Swindon.
- 3 May 2013: Youth graduates Alex Ferguson, Mark Francis, Aaron Oakley, Louis Thompson and Connor Waldon are offered professional contracts.
- 9 May 2013: It is confirmed that Simon Ferry, Raffaele De Vita, Joe Devera, Tommy Miller and Chris Smith will not be offered new deals.
- 16 May 2013: Budget restraints force Birmingham City end their interest in ex-Town captain Paul Caddis.
- 17 May 2013: The club confirm that the club had taken up contract options on Leigh Bedwell, Aden Flint, Miles Storey and Nathan Thompson.
- 20 May 2013: It's announced that the club are actively looking for five non-playing employees to take voluntary redundancy.
- 20 May 2013: The Swindon Advertiser report that the club have offered Paul Benson to arch-rivals Oxford United.
- 21 May 2013: Aden Flint's transfer request is rejected by the club amidst reports of interest from League One rivals Bristol City.
- 23 May 2013: The club confirm that search for non-playing staff to take voluntary redundancy had been completed.
- 23 May 2013: Tottenham Hotspur youngster Ryan Mason is linked with a move to Swindon Town.
- 23 May 2013: Town midfielder Luke Rooney is a transfer target for League Two sides Cheltenham Town and Portsmouth.
- 30 May 2013: Plymouth Argyle are reportedly interested in signing Town midfielders Luke Rooney and Lee Cox.
- 30 May 2013: The club confirm they are reviewing the contract of ex-Birmingham City loan centre forward Adam Rooney because of its "high value".
- 30 May 2013: Brothers Nathan Thompson and Louis Thompson sign two-year contracts with the club.
- 31 May 2013: It is reported that a deadline for club captain Alan McCormack to agree to a new deal has passed without a conclusion.
- 31 May 2013: Swindon Town celebrate the 20th anniversary of gaining promotion to the top flight for the first time in the club's history.
- 3 June 2013: BBC Wiltshire report that Swindon Town captain Alan McCormack has agreed a deal with Brentford.
- 3 June 2013: The club confirm that Gary Hooper and Callum Rice have stepped down from their position on the Board with immediate effect.
- 6 June 2013: Brentford duo Toumani Diagouraga and Clayton Donaldson plus former Norwich City midfielder Tom Adeyemi are linked to Town.
- 6 June 2013: After weeks of negotiations it is reported by BBC Bristol that Swindon have accepted a bid from Bristol City for Aden Flint.
- 11 June 2013: Aden Flint completes his move to Bristol City signing a 4-year deal.
- 12 June 2013: It is reported that the club have entered negotiations with goalkeeper Wes Foderingham over the possibility of a new two-year deal.
- 18 June 2013: Bradford City and Chesterfield are reportedly interested in midfielder Gary Roberts.
- 18 June 2013: Veteran defender Darren Ward is subject of strong interest from Brentford.
- 18 June 2013: Wales U21 international defender Aaron Oakley signs a one-year professional deal with the club.
- 19 June 2013: The Swindon Advertiser report that Crawley Town have entered the race to sign Swindon Town midfielder Luke Rooney.
- 20 June 2013: Former Tottenham Hotspur defender Jack Barthram is linked to a move to Swindon.
- 21 June 2013: Gary Roberts departs Swindon after he is released from his contract.
- 21 June 2013: It is reported that goalkeeper Wes Foderingham has verbally agreed to sign a new contract with the club.
- 22 June 2013: Darren Ward enters advanced talks with Brentford over a permanent move to Griffin Park.
- 24 June 2013: The first team return for pre-season training with Paul Caddis in attendance despite being linked with a move away from the club.
- 25 June 2013: Swindon Town complete the free transfer signings of Alex Smith and Jack Barthram.
- 25 June 2013: Wes Foderingham extends his contract with the club until the summer of 2015.
- 27 June 2013: Watford midfielder John Eustace is linked to club by the Swindon Advertiser.
- 27 June 2013: Swindon Town announce the departure of Paul Bodin as Under 18's manager effective immediately.

=== Pre-season news ===
- 1 July 2013: Stevenage captain Mark Roberts rejects a move to the club.
- 1 July 2013: Spurs duo Massimo Luongo and Grant Hall are confirmed to be training with the club while Daniel Devine arrives on trial.
- 2 July 2013: Another Tottenham Hotspur youngster, Alex Pritchard, is linked with a move to SN1.
- 2 July 2013: Spurs duo Massimo Luongo and Grant Hall join on season-long loan deals while Tijane signs a two-year contract.
- 4 July 2013: The fixture at MK Dons will be televised by SkySports in September.
- 4 July 2013: The Robins are handed a bye in the first round stage of the Johnstone's Paint Trophy.
- 8 July 2013: Reports indicate that Nathan Byrne is close to a permanent move to Swindon.
- 9 July 2013: Nathan Byrne joins for an undisclosed fee while former Spurs teammate Alex Pritchard signs a season-long loan deal.
- 9 July 2013: Lee Power and Sangita Shah are confirmed as new members of the Board.
- 13 July 2013: Contract-exile Adam Rooney is training with Oldham Athletic.
- 13 July 2013: Kevin MacDonald resigns as manager of the club.
- 16 July 2013: Les Ferdinand is linked to the vacant managerial role. Martin Ling and Robbie Fowler also declare their interest.
- 16 July 2013: Tottenham Hotspur centre forward Jonathan Obika is reported to be a transfer target for the Wiltshire club.
- 17 July 2013: Glenn Hoddle and Alloa Athletic boss Paul Hartley are the latest names to be linked with the Swindon managerial post.
- 17 July 2013: It is announced that former Floriana midfielder Harry Agombar has signed a permanent contract with the club.
- 17 July 2013: National reports suggest the former captain Paul Caddis is close to a move to Championship side Blackpool.
- 18 July 2013: Paul Caddis fails to agree terms with Blackpool while Neil Warnock and Paul Tisdale distance themselves from the Town job.
- 19 July 2013: Tottenham Hotspur youngster Ryan Mason is once again rumoured as a transfer target.
- 19 July 2013: Darren Ward has been offered a contract extension in a bid to keep the veteran defender at the club.
- 20 July 2013: Peter Schmeichel and John Jensen have been reportedly presented to Swindon Town as the club's potential new management team.
- 21 July 2013: SkySports link former Kilmarnock manager Kenny Shiels to the managerial position.
- 21 July 2013: It is reported that Swindon have accepted a bid from Hibs for centre forward James Collins.
- 22 July 2013: Wales international Simon Church is reportedly offered a permanent contract with the club.
- 24 July 2013: It is announced that the club's ongoing contract dispute with former manager Paolo Di Canio has been settled out of court.
- 25 July 2013: It was reported former Town defender Alberto Comazzi was set to take legal action against the club for unpaid costs.
- 25 July 2013: Former Malmö FF coach Bob Houghton is the latest name to emerge as a reported applicant for the Town manager job.
- 26 July 2013: Ryan Harley joins the club from Brighton & Hove Albion, signing on a two-year deal.
- 26 July 2013: Former Exeter City and Charlton Athletic defender Matt Taylor is linked with a move to Wiltshire.
- 1 August 2013: Adam Rooney signs for Oldham Athletic thus potentially ending a contract dispute with Swindon.
- 2 August 2013: Darren Ward is confirmed as the Swindon Town's new Club Captain.

=== Season news (2013) ===
- 7 August 2013: It is reported that Swindon are interested in signing Bournemouth's Wes Thomas and former Town forward Leon Clarke.
- 8 August 2013: Former Swindon Town defender Steve Aizlewood dies, aged 60, after a short illness.
- 9 August 2013: Bournemouth reject a second bid from Swindon for Wes Thomas.
- 9 August 2013: Exiled-Town forward Paul Benson is linked to a season-long loan move to Non-League side Luton Town.
- 12 August 2013: Captain Darren Ward is reportedly as set to sign a new contract. Millwall player Dany N'Guessan is also linked with a move.
- 13 August 2013: Ex-Newcastle United forward Nile Ranger has reportedly held talks with Swindon over the possibility of joining the club.
- 16 August 2013: Chairman Jed McCrory releases a statement justifying the decision to sign Nile Ranger despite the players ongoing legal issues.
- 19 August 2013: Paul Caddis is linked with a move to Millwall.
- 19 August 2013: Town captain Darren Ward signs a contract extension with club expiring in 2015.
- 20 August 2013: Mark Cooper is appointed manager of Swindon Town, signing a two-year contract.
- 22 August 2013: Luton Town managing director Gary Sweet tells the local press that a deal for Town forward Paul Benson is imminent.
- 22 August 2013: Mark Cooper confirms that Yeovil Town are interested in taking Andy Williams back to Huish Park.
- 23 August 2013: It is reported that ex-Motherwell midfielder Tom Hateley is training with the club.
- 27 August 2013: Former Town captain Paul Caddis publicly vents his frustration over his prolonged Town exit through a BBC radio interview.
- 27 August 2013: Peterborough United forward Emile Sinclair is linked but a move is reported as unlikely to take place.
- 29 August 2013: It is announced that Swindon Town's plum League Cup tie against Chelsea on 24 September will be televised live on SkySports.
- 2 September 2013: Yaser Kasim is subject of a reported £250,000 'Deadline Day' bid from a Championship level side.
- 9 September 2013: The club appeal against the dismissal of Nathan Byrne by referee Stuart Attwell during the 1–1 draw at Milton Keynes Dons.
- 13 September 2013: Miles Storey signs a contract extension with the club which is now scheduled to end in 2015.
- 19 September 2013: Over-subscription at the National Football Centre delays the treatment of Tijane Reis' knee injury.
- 26 September 2013: Yaser Kasim is called up by the Iraq senior squad for their international fixture against Saudi Arabia on 15 October 2013.
- 3 October 2013: Yaser Kasim signs a contract extension with the club, keeping the Iraqi at the County Ground until 2016.
- 11 October 2013: First Team Coach Luke Williams plays down news that Gus Poyet plans to add the Swindon coach to his Sunderland backroom staff.
- 6 November 2013: Andy Williams' season-long loan at Yeovil Town is cut-short after a serious knee injury ends his season.
- 7 November 2013: Steve Murrall leaves his role as Swindon Town's general manager.
- 15 November 2013: The club confirm that Nile Ranger has given a leave of absence as the forward prepares for his forthcoming court appearance.
- 22 November 2013: Reports emerge that Town goalkeeper Wes Foderingham could leave the club in the January transfer window.
- 23 November 2013: A man is arrested as Wiltshire Police investigate an attack on Leyton Orient goalkeeper Jamie Jones during Swindon's loss to Orient at the County Ground.
- 29 November 2013: Rumours of a boardroom dispute emerge when an official statement suggesting that Lee Power has taken ownership of the club from Jed McCrory is later withdrawn.
- 3 December 2013: Steve Murrall, the club's former general manager, tells the Swindon Advertiser that he did not resign from his position on the club's board.
- 3 December 2013: Jed McCrory resigns as chairman. He also steps down from his position on the board.
- 3 December 2013: Lee Power is confirmed as the new owner of Swindon Town Football Club.
- 4 December 2013: New Swindon Town owner, Lee Power, moves to allay financial fears surrounding the club.
- 12 December 2013: Swindon Town release the findings of a recent audit announcing that operating losses have fallen from £3.6m per annum to £1.2m.
- 19 December 2013: Steve Anderson is confirmed as the club's new general manager.
- 19 December 2013: Kidderminster Harriers defender, Cheyenne Dunkley, is linked with a move to Swindon Town.
- 27 December 2013: Town manager Mark Cooper admits that the club may look to offload Nile Ranger within the January transfer window after the forward failed to turn up for training.

=== Season news (2014) ===
- 1 January 2014: Swindon Town P–P Crawley Town (postponed due to a waterlogged pitch).
- 2 January 2014: Swindon Town's latest bid for AFC Bournemouth forward Wes Thomas is rejected.
- 8 January 2014: Chairman Lee Power opens talks with Liverpool centre-forward Michael Ngoo over a proposed loan transfer.
- 11 January 2014: The club announces that Nile Ranger had issued an apology to his teammates regarding his truant behaviour thus saving him from the sack.
- 13 January 2014: Lee Power bans the Swindon Advertiser from the club after reporter Sam Morshead made comments on Twitter regarding Nile Ranger's return to the squad.
- 24 January 2014: It is reported that Dany N'Guessan has been made available for loan by the club.
- 26 February 2014: Massimo Luongo is called up by the Australia senior side.
- 27 February 2014: Yaser Kasim is called up by the Iraq senior side.
- 4 March 2014: Swindon Town centre forward Nile Ranger is cleared of rape by a jury following a week-long trial at Newcastle Crown Court, Newcastle-upon-Tyne.
- 5 March 2014: Yaser Kasim makes his international debut for Iraq in the 3–1 AFC Asian Cup qualifier victory over China.
- 5 March 2014: Massimo Luongo makes his international debut for Australia in the 3–4 friendly loss to Ecuador.
- 10 March 2014: It is announced that Alex Pritchard is on the shortlist for Football League's Young Player of the Year award.
- 12 March 2014: The Football League shortlist Alex Pritchard for the annual League One Player of the Year award.
- 18 April 2014: An ownership disputes emerges when former holding company Seebeck 87 Ltd attempt to place three new director on the club board claiming that they were still owners of Swindon Town Football Club. The current holding company Swinton Reds 20 Ltd unsuccessfully attempt to obtain an injunction and Seebeck get the three individuals on the board with 'advisory' roles.
- 27 April 2014: The club release a statement reiterating that Swindon Town F.C. deplore acts of violence after newspaper reports publish a video involving Nile Ranger.
- 28 April 2014: Nile Ranger is held for questioning regarding the alleged assault on a woman and criminal damage in Swindon.
- 30 April 2014: Swinton Reds 20 Ltd and Seebeck 87 Ltd are locked in deliberations for two hours at the Rolls Building (Court rooms) before the ongoing ownership dispute was adjourned by Mr Justice Warren.
- 2 May 2014: Nile Ranger is released by the club.

== Tottenham Hotspur link up ==
Throughout 2013, Swindon Town seemingly built a close working relationship with Premier League side Tottenham Hotspur. Massimo Luongo, Nathan Byrne and Dean Parrett joined on loan deals during the closing stages of the 2012–13 season and the partnership grew during the 2013 close season. This included Spurs loaning and transferring players to Swindon, friendly fixtures being arranged between the two clubs and members of the Tottenham coaching staff being linked to the managerial position after Kevin MacDonald's exit from Swindon Town.

In December 2013, owner Lee Power announced that there was no special relationship Spurs.

=== Spurs connections linked to playing/coaching roles ===
Nat.	Name	Joined	Ref.
(England)	Harry Agombar	✓	
(England)	Jack Barthram	✓	
(England)	John Bostock	✗	
(England)	Nathan Byrne	✓	
(England)	Grant Hall	✓	
(Iraq)	Yaser Kasim	✓	
(Australia)	Massimo Luongo	✓	
(England)	Ryan Mason	✓	

Nat.	Name	Joined	Ref.
(England)	Jake Nicholson	✗	
(England)	Jonathan Obika	✗	
(England)	Alex Pritchard	✓	
(England)	Les Ferdinand	✗	
(England)	Glenn Hoddle	✗	
(England)	Alex Inglethorpe	✗	
(England)	Chris Ramsey	✗	
(England)	Tim Sherwood	✗	

== The 2013 manager search ==
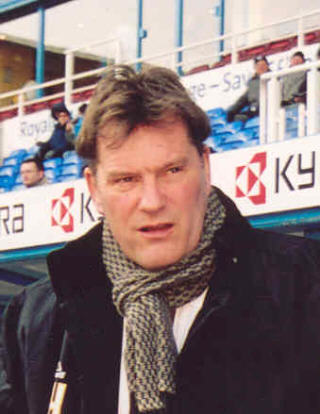
Former Town manager Glenn Hoddle emerged as a possible candidate within Bookmaker listings.

On 13 July 2013 manager Kevin MacDonald resigned from his post as manager citing "personal reasons". This sparked a flurry of media interest as the Wiltshire club began their search for a new manager. A recent but significant link with Spurs results in several of their coaches being linked with the vacancy (Tim Sherwood, Les Ferdinand and Chris Ramsey) while the Swindon Advertiser reported that former player Martin Ling was interested in the role. The local media order linked Danish duo Peter Schmeichel and John Jensen along with Exeter City manager Paul Tisdale. The national media linked Kenny Shiels while Paul Hartley, Neil Warnock, Glenn Hoddle, Paul Trollope and Stuart Pearce were rated among the favourites on Bookmaker listings. After five and a half weeks without making an appointment, caretaker manager Mark Cooper is given the role on a permanent basis, signing a two-year contract.

=== Coaches linked ===
Nat.	Coach	Ref
(England)	Mark Cooper	
(England)	Les Ferdinand	
(England)	Robbie Fowler	
(Scotland)	Paul Hartley	
(England)	Glenn Hoddle	
(England)	Bob Houghton	
(England)	Alex Inglethorpe	
(Denmark)	John Jensen; Peter Schmeichel	

Nat.	Coach	Ref
(England)	Martin Ling	
(England)	Stuart Pearce	
(England)	Chris Ramsey	
(England)	Karl Robinson	
(England)	Tim Sherwood	
(Northern Ireland)	Kenny Shiels	
(England)	Paul Tisdale	
(England)	Neil Warnock	

== League One data ==
Pos	Team	Pld	W	D	L	GF	GA	GD	Pts	Promotion, qualification or relegation
6	Peterborough United	46	23	5	18	72	58	+14	74	Qualification for League One play-offs (Note: Four teams play for one spot and promotion to Football League Championship.)
7	Sheffield United	46	18	13	15	48	46	+2	67	
8	Swindon Town	46	19	9	18	63	59	+4	66	
9	Port Vale	46	18	7	21	59	73	−14	61	
10	Milton Keynes Dons	46	17	9	20	63	65	−2	60	

Updated to match(es) played on 3 May 2014. Source: BBC Sport
Rules for classification: 1) Points; 2) Goal difference; 3) Number of goals scored

=== Result summary ===
Round	1	2	3	4	5	6	7	8	9	10	11	12	13	14	15	16	17	18	19	20	21	22	23	24	25	26	27	28	29	30	31	32	33	34	35	36	37	38	39	40	41	42	43	44	45	46
Ground	A	H	A	H	H	A	A	H	A	H	A	H	H	A	H	A	H	A	H	A	H	A	A	H	A	A	H	A	H	A	H	A	H	A	H	H	A	H	A	H	A	H	A	H	A	H
Result	L	W	L	D	W	D	L	W	L	W	W	W	L	L	W	W	L	D	W	L	W	L	D	W	L	L	W	D	L	W	D	L	D	D	L	L	D	W	W	W	L	W	W	W	L	L
Position	21	11	17	16	10	9	12	11	12	11	7	6	8	8	7	6	7	8	7	8	7	7	8	8	8	9	8	8	8	8	8	8	8	7	8	9	9	8	8	7	8	7	7	7	7	8

Source: soccerbase.com
A = Away; H = Home; W = Win; D = Draw; L = Loss

== Sponsors ==
Samsung

Supplier: Adidas
Sponsor(s): Samsung (Home), EA Sports (Away).

== Pre-season ==
Between 2006 and 2012, Swindon Town spent time during their pre-season schedule abroad in the Balearic Islands, Austria and Italy. The 2013/14 schedule started in England with friendlies arranged with Swindon Supermarine (away), Banbury United (away), Forest Green Rovers (away) which were followed by home ties against Tottenham Hotspur and Birmingham City. An away trip against Cirencester Town completed the scheduled along with Development XI friendlies at Devizes Town and Fairford Town. It was later announced that Swindon would spend a week in Portugal from 21 July. Two friendlies would also be arranged.

Pre-season began with a comfortable 3–1 victory at Swindon Supermarine. However, this was followed by a poor 2–0 defeat at Banbury United where Kevin MacDonald criticised the standard of the Oxfordshire outfit's pitch. Swindon Town got back to winning ways as a Development side beat Devizes Town 5–0 at Nursteed Road. Days later, Town faced Non-League side Forest Green Rovers who easily beat Swindon 2–0. Reports begin to circulate that manager Kevin MacDonald is set to resign from his post and this is confirmed 24 hours later citing "personal reasons" for his exit and assistant Mark Cooper is named Caretaker manager.

=== Pre-Season results and line-ups ===
Win Draw Loss

2 July 2013 Friendly	Swindon Supermarine	1–3	Swindon Town	Webb's Wood Stadium, South Marston
19:30	Dean 70'	Report	Rooney 43'; Collins 47'; Williams 66'

5 July 2013 Friendly	Banbury United	2–0	Swindon Town	Spencer Stadium, Banbury
19:45	Craig 25'; Skendi 50'	Report

9 July 2013 Friendly	Devizes Town	0–5	Swindon Town	Nursteed Road, Devizes
19:30		Report	Storey 16'; Gros; Sofiane; Caddis 47' (pen.); Waldon

12 July 2013 Friendly	Forest Green Rovers	2–0	Swindon Town	The New Lawn, Nailsworth
19:45	Klukowski 37' (pen.); Mangan 39'	Report		Attendance: 904; Referee: R. Martin

16 July 2013 Friendly	Swindon Town	1–1	Tottenham Hotspur	County Ground, Swindon
19:00	Williams 76'	Report	Bale 16'	Attendance: 10,465; Referee: S. Hooper

17 July 2013 Friendly	Swindon Town	0–3	Birmingham City	County Ground, Swindon
		Report	Novak 41' 59'; Shinnie 86'	Attendance: 1,433; Referee: S. Hooper

23 July 2013 Training	Swindon Town	5–0	Tottenham Hotspur XI	Carvoeiro, Portugal

27 July 2013 Training	Swindon Town	3–3	Tottenham Hotspur XI	Carvoeiro, Portugal

30 July 2013 Friendly	Cirencester Town	1–3	Swindon Town	Corinium Stadium, Cirencester
	Collier 88'	Report	Pritchard 36'; Storey 82' 90'

== League One ==
The fixture list for the 2013/14 campaign was announced on 19 June 2013. It was announced that the Wiltshire outfits first game of the season would take place against Darren Ferguson's Peterborough United at London Road on 3 August 2013.

=== August ===
Win Draw Loss Postponed

3 August 2013 1	Peterborough United	1–0	Swindon Town	London Road, Peterborough
15:00	Assombalonga 9'	Report		Attendance: 7,178; Referee: James Linington (Isle of Wight)

10 August 2013 2	Swindon Town	1–0	Stevenage	County Ground, Swindon
15:00	Luongo 26'	Report		Attendance: 7,133; Referee: Dean Whitestone (Northants)

17 August 2013 3	Shrewsbury Town	2–0	Swindon Town	New Meadow, Shrewsbury
15:00	Reach 9'; Bradshaw 85'	Report		Attendance: 4,943; Referee: Andy Woolmer (Northants)

24 August 2013 4	Swindon Town	2–2	Gillingham	County Ground, Swindon
15:00	Byrne 12'; N. Thompson 68'	Report	Kedwell 18'; McDonald 85'	Attendance: 7,520; Referee: Iain Williamson (Berkshire)

31 August 2013 5	Swindon Town	5–0	Crewe Alexandra	County Ground, Swindon
15:00	Ranger 38'; Luongo 44'; Mason 46' 54' (pen.) 70'	[Report]		Attendance: 7,419; Referee: Andy Davies (Hampshire)

=== September ===
7 September 2013 6	Milton Keynes Dons	1–1	Swindon Town	Stadium mk, Milton Keynes
12:15	Bamford 55'	[Report]	Pritchard 17'	Attendance: 7,738; Referee: Stuart Attwell (Warwickshire)

14 September 2013 7	Wolverhampton Wanderers	3–2	Swindon Town	The Molineux, Wolverhampton
15:00	Golbourne 3'; Doyle 43'; Foley 90'	Report	N'Guessan 82'; Mason 90'	Attendance: 19,388; Referee: Gary Sutton (Lincolnshire)

21 September 2013 8	Swindon Town	3–2	Bristol City	County Ground, Swindon
15:00	Flint 19' 43'; Ranger 87'	Report	Flint 9'; Emmanuel-Thomas 36'	Attendance: 11,598; Referee: Anthony Taylor (Manchester)

28 September 2013 9	Preston North End	2–1	Swindon Town	Deepdale, Preston
15:00	Hume 11'; McEveley 48' (o.g.)	Report	N'Guessan 86'	Attendance: 9,296; Referee: Mick Russell (Hertfordshire)

=== October ===
5 October 2013 10	Swindon Town	1–0	Tranmere Rovers	County Ground, Swindon
15:00	N'Guessan 29' (pen.)	Report		Attendance: 7,889; Referee: Charles Breakspear (Surrey)

12 October 2013 11	Rotherham United	0–4	Swindon Town	New York Stadium, Rotherham
15:00		Report	Pritchard 33'; Luongo 45'; Ajose 65'; N'Guessan 90'	Attendance: 8,103; Referee: Andy Haines (Tyne & Wear)

18 October 2013 12	Swindon Town	2–0	Notts County	County Ground, Swindon
19:45	Ranger 11'; N'Guessan 28' (pen.)	Report		Attendance: 8,188; Referee: Darren Deadman (Cambridgeshire)

22 October 2013 13	Swindon Town	1–3	Walsall	County Ground, Swindon
19:45	Ranger 83'	Report	Hemmings 18' 78'; Mantom 48'	Attendance: 8,188; Referee: Darren Sheldrake (Middlesex)

26 October 2013 14	Oldham Athletic	2–1	Swindon Town	Boundary Park, Oldham
15:00	Winchester 32'; Philliskirk 77'	Report	Tarkowski 56' (o.g.)	Attendance: 3,837; Referee: Jeremy Simpson (Lancashire)

=== November ===
2 November 2013 15	Swindon Town	5–2	Port Vale	County Ground, Swindon
15:00	N'Guessan 24'; Ranger 50'; Luongo 57' 90'; Byrne 82'	Report	Pope 73'; Hughes 80'	Attendance: 7,637; Referee: Andy Woolmer (Northamptonshire)

16 November 2013 16	Colchester United	1–2	Swindon Town	Colchester Community Stadium, Colchester
15:00	Okuonghae 78'	Report	Ajose 28'; N'Guessan 47'	Attendance: 3,334; Referee: Graham Horwood (Bedfordshire)

23 November 2013 17	Swindon Town	1–3	Leyton Orient	County Ground, Swindon
15:00	Nicky Ajose 23'	Report	David Mooney 24'; Moses Odubajo 40' 46'	Attendance: 8,634; Referee: Chris Sarginson (Staffordshire)

26 November 2013 18	Crawley Town	0–0	Swindon Town	Broadfield Stadium, Crawley
19:45		Report		Attendance: 2,868; Referee: Andy D'Urso (Essex)

30 November 2013 19	Swindon Town	3–1	Carlisle United	County Ground, Swindon
15:00	Luongo 36'; Pritchard 72'; N'Guessan 90'	Report	O'Hanlon 69'	Attendance: 7,671; Referee: Steve Bratt (West Midlands)

=== December ===
14 December 2013 20	Sheffield United	1–0	Swindon Town	Bramall Lane, Sheffield
15:00	Baxter 67'	Report		Attendance: 15,430; Referee: Scott Duncan (Tyne & Wear)

21 December 2013 21	Swindon Town	2–1	Coventry City	County Ground, Swindon
15:00	Kasim 77'; Storey 86'	Report	L. Clarke 51'	Attendance: 9,291; Referee: Gavin Ward (Surrey)

26 December 2013 22	Brentford	3–2	Swindon Town	Griffin Park, Brentford
15:00	Saunders 27'; Donaldson 55'; Trotta 71'	Report	Mason 10'; Ajose 53'	Attendance: 8,333; Referee: Keith Hill (Hertfordshire)

29 December 2013 23	Bradford City	1–1	Swindon Town	Valley Parade, Bradford
15:00	McArdle 16'	Report	Pritchard 63'	Attendance: 13,461; Referee: Oliver Langford (West Midlands)

=== January ===
11 January 2014 24	Swindon Town	2–1	Peterborough United	County Ground, Swindon
15:00	Ranger 28'; Kasim 70'	Report	Knight-Percival 78'	Attendance: 7,794; Referee: Mark Haywood (West Yorkshire)

14 January 2014 25	Stevenage	2–0	Swindon Town	Broadhall Way, Stevenage
19:45	Akins 39'; Morais 56' (pen.)	[Report]		Attendance: 2,167; Referee: Lee Collins (Surrey)

18 January 2014 26	Gillingham	2–0	Swindon Town	Priestfield, Gillingham
15:00	Legge 18'; Harriman 83'	Report		Attendance: 6,134; Referee: Andrew Madley (West Yorkshire)

25 January 2014 27	Swindon Town	3–1	Shrewsbury Town	County Ground, Swindon
15:00	Smith 30' 90'; Ranger 89'	Report	Parry 44'	Attendance: 7,448; Referee: Trevor Kettle (Berkshire)

28 January 2014 28	Walsall	1–1	Swindon Town	Bescot Stadium, Walsall
19:45	Sawyers 37'	Report	M. Smith 71'	Attendance: 4,059; Referee: Mark Brown (East Yorkshire)

=== February ===
1 February 2014 29	Swindon Town	0–1	Oldham Athletic	County Ground, Swindon
15:00		Report	Ground 73'	Attendance: 7,391; Referee: Tim Robinson (West Sussex)

8 February 2014 30	Port Vale	2–3	Swindon Town	Vale Park, Burslem
15:00	Loft 20'; Pope 42'	Report	Ranger 51'; Pritchard 65'; Byrne 69'	Attendance: 5,306; Referee: Seb Stockbridge (Tyne & Wear)

15 February 2014 31	Swindon Town	0–0	Colchester United	County Ground, Swindon
15:00		Report		Attendance: 6,683; Referee: Darren Sheldrake (Surrey)

22 February 2014 32	Leyton Orient	2–0	Swindon Town	Brisbane Road, Leyton
15:00	James 42' (pen.) 52' (pen.)	Report		Attendance: 5,091; Referee: Gavin Ward (Surrey)

25 February 2014 33	Swindon Town	1–1	Crawley Town	County Ground, Swindon
19:45	Byrne 49'	Report	Tubbs 80'	Attendance: 7,062; Referee: Steve Rushton (Staffordshire)

=== March ===
1 March 2014 34	Crewe Alexandra	0–0	Swindon Town	Alexandra Stadium, Crewe
15:00	Oliver 77'	Report	Harley 45'	Attendance: 4,433; Referee: Robert Lewis (Shropshire)

8 March 2014 35	Swindon Town	1–2	Milton Keynes Dons	County Ground, Swindon
15:00	M. Smith 19'	Report	Kay 68'; Baldock 90'	Referee: Jeremy Simpson (Lancashire)

11 March 2014 36	Swindon Town	1–4	Wolverhampton Wanderers	County Ground, Swindon
19:45	M. Smith 74'	Report	Sako 9' 34'; Dicko 19'; Clarke 90'	Attendance: 9,670; Referee: Lee Collins (Surrey)

15 March 2014 37	Bristol City	0–0	Swindon Town	Ashton Gate Stadium, Bristol
15:00		Report		Attendance: 14,884; Referee: Trevor Kettle (Berkshire)

22 March 2014 38	Swindon Town	1–0	Preston North End	County Ground, Swindon
15:00	M. Smith 74' (pen.)	Report		Attendance: 7,570; Referee: Iain Williamson (Berkshire)

25 March 2014 39	Tranmere Rovers	1–2	Swindon Town	Prenton Park, Birkenhead
19:45	Power 15'	Report	A. Smith 12'; Storey 68'	Attendance: 3,717; Referee: Graham Salisbury (Lancashire)

29 March 2014 40	Swindon Town	2–1	Sheffield United	County Ground, Swindon
15:00	Storey 18'; L. Thompson 90'	Report	Doyle 59'	Attendance: 8,441; Referee: Keith Hill (Hertfordshire)

=== April ===
5 April 2014 41	Carlisle United	1–0	Swindon Town	Brunton Park, Carlisle
15:00	Madine 38'	Report		Attendance: 4,055; Referee: Nigel Miller (County Durham)

12 April 2014 42	Swindon Town	1–0	Brentford	County Ground, Swindon
15:00	L. Thompson 45'	Report		Attendance: 9,342; Referee: Brendan Malone (Wiltshire)

18 April 2014 43	Coventry City	1–2	Swindon Town	Sixfields Stadium, Northampton
15:00	Fleck 43'	Report	Pritchard 8'; M. Smith 90'	Attendance: 3,091; Referee: Chris Sarginson (Staffordshire)

21 April 2014 44	Swindon Town	1–0	Bradford City	County Ground, Swindon
15:00	Cox 64'	Report		Attendance: 8,377; Referee: Charles Breakspear (Surrey)

26 April 2014 45	Notts County	2–0	Swindon Town	Meadow Lane, Nottingham
15:00	Sheehan 9'; McGregor 90'	Report		Attendance: 6,714; Referee: Richard Clark (Northumberland)

=== May ===
3 May 2014 46	Swindon Town	1–2	Rotherham United	County Ground, Swindon
15:00	M. Smith 60' (pen.)	Report	Thomas 1' 23'	Attendance: 8,618; Referee: Dean Whitestone (Northamptonshire)

== FA Cup ==
Win Draw Loss

9 November 2013 1st Round	Macclesfield Town	4–0	Swindon Town	Moss Rose, Macclesfield
15:00	Jennings 26' 74'; Boden 70'; Winn 89'	Report		Attendance: 1,835; Referee: Andy Madley (West Yorkshire)

== League Cup ==
On 12 June 2013 it was confirmed that Swindon Town had been seeded for the first round of the competition. It was later announced that Swindon would face Football League Two outfit Torquay United in the opening round of the competition. Win Draw Loss

6 August 2013 1st Round	Swindon Town	1–0	Torquay United	County Ground, Swindon
19:45	Williams 83'	Report		Attendance: 5,662; Referee: Andy D'Urso (Essex)

27 August 2013 2nd Round	Queen's Park Rangers	0–2	Swindon Town	Loftus Road, Shepherd's Bush
19:45		Report	Ranger 38'; Pritchard 90'	Attendance: 9,715; Referee: Phil Gibbs (West Midlands)

24 September 2013 3rd Round	Swindon Town	0–2	Chelsea	County Ground, Swindon
19:45		Report	Torres 29'; Ramires 35'	Attendance: 14,924; Referee: Michael Oliver (Northumberland)

== Football League Trophy ==
Win Draw Loss

8 October 2013 R2 (South West)	Swindon Town	2–1	Plymouth Argyle	County Ground, Swindon
19:45	Barthram 19'; Ajose 46'	Report	Blackman 7'	Attendance: 4,211; Referee: James Linington (Isle of Wight)

12 November 2013 Q-F (South)	Swindon Town	2–1	Wycombe Wanderers	County Ground, Swindon
19:45	Ajose 78' 90'	Report	McClure 45'	Attendance: 3,940; Referee: Carl Berry (Surrey)

10 December 2013 S-F (South)	Swindon Town	1–1 (3–1 p)	Stevenage	County Ground, Swindon
19:45	Ajose 24'	Report	Zoko 82'	Attendance: 3,804; Referee: Stephen Martin (Staffordshire)
	Penalties
	Pritchard (penalty scored); El-Gabbas (penalty scored); Kasim (penalty scored)		(penalty scored) Zoko; (penalty missed) Freeman; (penalty missed) Chorley; (penalty missed) Morais

5 February 2013 Final (South) #1	Peterborough United	2–2	Swindon Town	London Road, Peterborough
19:15	Branco 10' (o.g.); Vassell 14'	Report	Ranger 31'; Brisley 45' (o.g.)	Attendance: 3,312; Referee: Paul Tierney (Lancashire)

17 February 2013 Final (South) #2	Swindon Town	1–1 (3–4 p)	Peterborough United	County Ground, Swindon
19:45	Pritchard 34'		Assombalonga 75'	Attendance: 6,825; Referee: Keith Stroud (Hampshire)
	Penalties
	Luongo (penalty missed); Kasim (penalty scored); Pritchard (penalty scored); Archibald-Henville (penalty scored); Reis (penalty missed)		(penalty scored) Assombalonga; (penalty scored) Bostwick; (penalty missed) Swanson; (penalty scored) McCann; (penalty scored) Rowe

== Club information ==
=== Non-playing staff ===
In December 2013, Swindon Town changed ownership with Lee Power replacing Jed McCrory.

=== Jed McCrory Era (up until 3 December 2013) ===
As of 3 December 2013

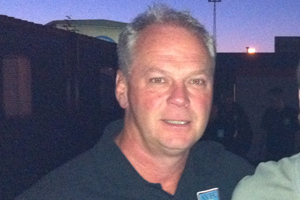
Kevin MacDonald resigned in July.

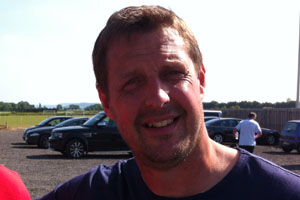
Fraser Digby returned as Town's Goalkeeping Coach for the 2013/14 season.

Position	Name
Chairman	(England) Jed McCrory
Directors	(England) Jed McCrory (Republic of Ireland) Lee Power (England) Sangita Shah
General Manager	(England) Steve Murrall (until 07/11/13)
Manager	(Scotland) Kevin MacDonald (until 13 July 2013) (England) Mark Cooper (caretaker 13 July 2013 – 20 August 2013) (England) Mark Cooper (20 August 2013 – present)
Assistant Manager	(England) Mark Cooper (until 13 July 2013) (England) Luke Williams (First Team Coach)
Goalkeeping Coach	(England) Fraser Digby
Physiotherapist	(England) Paul Godfrey
Sports Scientist	(England) Michael Cooper
Head of Youth & Academy Manager	(England) Jeremy Newton
U18's Coach	(England) Jamie Pitman
Football Development Officer	(England) Dave Warren
Kit Manager	(England) Roger Jones
Club Chaplain	(England) Simon Stevenette

=== Lee Power Era (from 3 December 2013) ===
As of 3 December 2013

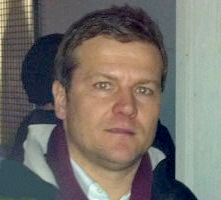
Mark Cooper was assistant under Kevin MacDonald before becoming permanent manager in August 2013.

Position	Name
Owner	(Republic of Ireland) Lee Power
Directors	(Republic of Ireland) Lee Power (England) Sangita Shah
General Manager	(England) Steve Anderson
Manager	(England) Mark Cooper
First Team Coach	(England) Luke Williams
Goalkeeping Coach	(England) Fraser Digby
Physiotherapist	(England) Paul Godfrey
Sports Scientist	(England) Michael Cooper
Head of Youth & Academy Manager	(England) Jeremy Newton
U18's Coach	(England) Jamie Pitman
Football Development Officer	(England) Dave Warren
Kit Manager	(England) Roger Jones
Club Chaplain	(England) Simon Stevenette

== Squad statistics ==
=== Appearances and goals ===
As of 3 May 2014

No.	Pos	Nat	Player	Total		League One		FA Cup		League Cup		JP Trophy	
No.	Pos	Nat	Player	Apps	Goals	Apps	Goals	Apps	Goals	Apps	Goals	Apps	Goals
1	GK	(England) ENG	Wes Foderingham	46	0	41+0	0	0+0	0	3+0	0	2+0	0
2	DF	(England) ENG	Nathan Thompson	44	1	41+0	1	0+0	0	2+0	0	1+0	0
3	DF	(England) ENG	Nathan Byrne	44	4	31+6	4	1+0	0	2+0	0	3+1	0
4	MF	(Australia) AUS	Massimo Luongo	53	6	44+0	6	1+0	0	2+1	0	5+0	0
5	DF	(England) ENG	Grant Hall (on loan from Tottenham Hotspur)	34	0	26+1	0	1+0	0	3+0	0	3+0	0
6	MF	(Portugal) POR	Tijane Reis	7	0	2+4	0	0+0	0	1+0	0	0+0	0
7	MF	(England) ENG	Ryan Harley	25	1	16+5	1	1+0	0	1+0	0	1+1	0
8	MF	(England) ENG	Ryan Mason (on loan from Tottenham Hotspur)	22	5	13+5	5	1+0	0	1+1	0	1+0	0
9	FW	(England) ENG	Nile Ranger	28	10	19+4	8	1+0	0	2+0	1	1+1	1
10	FW	(England) ENG	Andy Williams	4	1	3+0	0	0+0	0	1+0	1	0+0	0
12	FW	(France) FRA	Dany N'Guessan	31	8	14+10	8	1+0	0	1+0	0	4+1	0
14	DF	(Scotland) SCO	Jay McEveley	37	0	31+1	0	1+0	0	1+0	0	3+0	0
15	MF	(Iraq) IRQ	Yaser Kasim	45	2	34+3	2	1+0	0	3+0	0	3+1	0
16	FW	(England) ENG	Mark Francis	0	0	0+0	0	0+0	0	0+0	0	0+0	0
17	FW	(England) ENG	Connor Waldon	3	0	1+2	0	0+0	0	0+0	0	0+0	0
19	MF	(Wales) WAL	Louis Thompson	33	2	17+11	2	0+0	0	1+1	0	3+0	0
20	FW	(England) ENG	Miles Storey	20	3	7+11	3	0+0	0	0+2	0	0+0	0
21	MF	(England) ENG	Alex Smith	10	1	5+3	1	0+0	0	1+1	0	0+0	0
22	DF	(England) ENG	Darren Ward	45	0	36+0	0	1+0	0	3+0	0	5+0	0
23	DF	(England) ENG	Jack Barthram	15	1	3+8	0	1+0	0	1+0	0	2+0	1
24	MF	(England) ENG	Lee Cox	6	1	4+1	1	0+0	0	0+0	0	0+1	0
25	GK	(England) ENG	Tyrell Belford	9	0	5+0	0	1+0	0	0+0	0	3+0	0
27	MF	(England) ENG	Harry Agombar	0	0	0+0	0	0+0	0	0+0	0	0+0	0
28	FW	(England) ENG	Michael Smith	20	8	20+0	8	0+0	0	0+0	0	0+0	0
29	DF	(Brazil) BRA	Raphael Rossi Branco	18	0	13+2	0	0+0	0	0+0	0	3+0	0
32	MF	(England) ENG	Alan Navarro	0	0	0+0	0	0+0	0	0+0	0	0+0	0
33	FW	(England) ENG	George Baker	8	0	2+6	0	0+0	0	0+0	0	0+0	0
34	DF	(England) ENG	Jamie Reckord (on loan from Wolverhampton Wanderers)	5	0	3+2	0	0+0	0	0+0	0	0+0	0
36	DF	(England) ENG	Matty Jones	1	0	0+1	0	0+0	0	0+0	0	0+0	0
37	FW	(England) ENG	Ryan Wood	0	0	0+0	0	0+0	0	0+0	0	0+0	0
38	MF	(Wales) WAL	Liam Walsh	0	0	0+0	0	0+0	0	0+0	0	0+0	0
39	MF	(England) ENG	Ben Gladwin	15	0	6+7	0	0+0	0	0+0	0	1+1	0
40	DF	(England) ENG	Jack Stephens (on loan from Southampton)	10	0	10+0	0	0+0	0	0+0	0	0+0	0
41	DF	(England) ENG	Troy Archibald-Henville	15	0	13+1	0	0+0	0	0+0	0	1+0	0
42	FW	(England) ENG	Will Randall	1	0	0+1	0	0+0	0	0+0	0	0+0	0
44	DF	(England) ENG	Curtis Da Costa	0	0	0+0	0	0+0	0	0+0	0	0+0	0
Players who are contracted to Swindon Town but are currently out on loan:
18	MF	(England) ENG	Alex Ferguson	0	0	0+0	0	0+0	0	0+0	0	0+0	0
26	DF	(Wales) WAL	Aaron Oakley	0	0	0+0	0	0+0	0	0+0	0	0+0	0
30	GK	(England) ENG	Leigh Bedwell	0	0	0+0	0	0+0	0	0+0	0	0+0	0
31	FW	(England) ENG	Paul Benson	0	0	0+0	0	0+0	0	0+0	0	0+0	0
35	FW	(England) ENG	Kayden Jackson	0	0	0+0	0	0+0	0	0+0	0	0+0	0
Players who were contracted to Swindon Town but have since departed on a permanent basis:
11	MF	(England) ENG	Alex Pritchard (on loan from Tottenham Hotspur)	44	7	33+3	6	1+0	0	3+0	1	4+0	0
28	MF	(England) ENG	Luke Rooney	0	0	0+0	0	0+0	0	0+0	0	0+0	0
33	FW	(England) ENG	Nicky Ajose (on loan from Peterborough United)	21	10	12+4	6	1+0	0	1+0	0	3+0	4
34	FW	(Egypt) EGY	Mohamed El-Gabbas	10	0	0+6	0	0+0	0	0+1	0	1+2	0
40	MF	(England) ENG	Jacob Murphy (on loan from Norwich City)	7	0	2+4	0	0+0	0	0+0	0	1+0	0
	DF	(Scotland) SCO	Paul Caddis	0	0	0+0	0	0+0	0	0+0	0	0+0	0

=== Goalscorers ===
As of 3 May 2014

Name	League	FA Cup	League Cup	JP Trophy	Total
Nicky Ajose	6	0	0	4	10
Jack Barthram	0	0	0	1	1
Nathan Byrne	4	0	0	0	4
Lee Cox	1	0	0	0	1
Ryan Harley	1	0	0	0	1
Yaser Kasim	2	0	0	0	2
Massimo Luongo	6	0	0	0	6
Ryan Mason	5	0	0	0	5
Dany N'Guessan	8	0	0	0	8
Alex Pritchard	6	0	1	1	8
Nile Ranger	8	0	1	1	10
Alex Smith	1	0	0	0	1
Michael Smith	8	0	0	0	8
Miles Storey	3	0	0	0	3
Louis Thompson	2	0	0	0	2
Nathan Thompson	1	0	0	0	1
Andy Williams	0	0	1	0	1
Own Goals	2	0	0	0	2
Total	63	0	3	8	74

=== Penalties ===
As of 3 May 2014

Includes all competitive matches.

R	No.	Pos	Nat	Name	Competition	Opposition	Success	Final Score
1	11	MF	(England)	Alex Pritchard	The League Cup	vs. Torquay United	✗	1–0 WIN
2	8	MF	(England)	Ryan Mason	League One	vs. Crewe Alexandra	✓	5–0 WIN
3	8	MF	(England)	Ryan Mason	League One	vs. Crewe Alexandra	✗	5–0 WIN
4	12	FW	(France)	Dany N'Guessan	League One	vs. Tranmere Rovers	✓	1–0 WIN
5	12	FW	(France)	Dany N'Guessan	League One	vs. Notts County	✓	2–0 WIN
6	11	MF	(England)	Alex Pritchard	Football League Trophy	vs. Stevenage	✓	3–1 on pens.
7	34	FW	(Egypt)	Mohamed El-Gabbas	Football League Trophy	vs. Stevenage	✓	3–1 on pens.
8	15	MF	(Iraq)	Yaser Kasim	Football League Trophy	vs. Stevenage	✓	3–1 on pens.
9	4	MF	(Australia)	Massimo Luongo	Football League Trophy	vs. Peterborough United	✗	3–4 on pens.
10	15	MF	(Iraq)	Yaser Kasim	Football League Trophy	vs. Peterborough United	✓	3–4 on pens.
11	11	MF	(Australia)	Alex Pritchard	Football League Trophy	vs. Peterborough United	✓	3–4 on pens.
12	41	DF	(England)	Troy Archibald-Henville	Football League Trophy	vs. Peterborough United	✓	3–4 on pens.
13	6	MF	(Portugal)	Tijane Reis	Football League Trophy	vs. Peterborough United	✗	3–4 on pens.
14	28	FW	(England)	Michael Smith	League One	vs. Preston North End	✓	1–0 WIN.
15	28	FW	(England)	Michael Smith	League One	vs. Brentford	✗	1–0 WIN.
16	28	FW	(England)	Michael Smith	League One	vs. Rotherham United	✓	1–2 Loss.

Last updated: 12 December 2013
Source: Match reports in Competitive matches

=== Clean sheets ===
As of 3 May 2014

Includes all competitive matches.

R	No.	Pos	Nat	Name	League One	FA Cup	League Cup	JP Trophy	Total
1	1	GK	(England)	Wes Foderingham	11	0	2	0	13
2	25	GK	(England)	Tyrell Belford	1	0	0	0	1
				TOTALS	12	0	2	0	14

Last updated: 11 January 2014
Source: Match reports in Competitive matches

=== Disciplinary ===
As of 3 May 2014

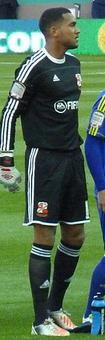
Wes Foderingham

Name	League One		FA Cup		League Cup		JP Trophy		Total	
Name	Yellow card	Red card	Yellow card	Red card	Yellow card	Red card	Yellow card	Red card	Yellow card	Red card
Troy Archibald-Henville	4	2	0	0	0	0	0	0	4	2
Jack Barthram	2	0	0	0	0	0	1	0	3	0
Raphael Rossi Branco	4	0	0	0	0	0	2	0	6	0
Nathan Byrne	4	2	0	0	0	0	1	0	5	2
Lee Cox	1	0	0	0	0	0	0	0	1	0
Mohamed El-Gabbas	1	0	0	0	0	0	0	0	1	0
Wes Foderingham	3	0	0	0	0	0	0	0	3	0
Grant Hall	4	0	1	0	1	0	0	0	6	0
Ryan Harley	2	0	0	0	0	0	0	0	2	0
Yaser Kasim	10	0	0	0	0	0	2	0	12	0
Massimo Luongo	5	0	0	0	0	0	0	0	5	0
Ryan Mason	3	0	0	0	1	0	0	0	4	0
Jay McEveley	11	1	0	0	0	0	0	1	11	2
Dany N'Guessan	0	0	0	0	0	0	2	0	2	0
Alex Pritchard	9	1	0	0	0	0	0	0	8	1
Jamie Reckord	2	0	0	0	0	0	0	0	2	0
Tijane Reis	2	0	0	0	0	0	0	0	2	0
Alex Smith	1	0	0	0	0	0	0	0	1	0
Michael Smith	4	0	0	0	0	0	0	0	4	0
Jack Stephens	3	0	0	0	0	0	0	0	3	0
Louis Thompson	3	0	0	0	0	0	1	0	4	0
Nathan Thompson	11	1	0	0	1	0	0	0	13	1
Total	88	7	1	0	3	0	9	1	101	7

=== Suspensions ===
As of 3 May 2014

Date	Suspended Player	Reason	Punishment	Missed Opponents
7 September 2013	(England) Nathan Byrne	Red card	3 match ban	Wolverhampton Wanderers, Bristol City and Chelsea
14 September 2013	(England) Alex Pritchard	Yellow card	1 match ban	Bristol City
5 October 2013	(England) Nathan Thompson	Yellow card	1 match ban	Plymouth Argyle
22 October 2013	(Scotland) Jay McEveley	Yellow card	1 match ban	Oldham Athletic
26 October 2013	(Iraq) Yaser Kasim	Yellow card	1 match ban	Port Vale
23 November 2013	(Scotland) Jay McEveley	Yellow card Red card	1 match ban	Crawley Town
26 November 2013	(England) Nathan Byrne	Yellow card Red card	2 match ban	Carlisle United and Stevenage (FLT)
28 January 2014	(England) Alex Pritchard	Yellow card	2 match ban	Oldham Athletic and Peterborough United (FLT)
1 February 2014	(England) Troy Archibald-Henville	Yellow card Red card	1 match ban	Peterborough United (FLT)
5 February 2014	(Scotland) Jay McEveley	Red card	4 match ban	Port Vale, Colchester United, Peterborough United (FLT)
5 February 2014	(Iraq) Yaser Kasim	Yellow card	1 match ban	Port Vale and Colchester United
5 February 2014	(England) Nathan Thompson	Yellow card	1 match ban	Peterborough United (FLT), Leyton Orient
15 March 2014	(England) Alex Pritchard	Red card	3 match ban	Preston North End, Tranmere Rovers, Sheffield United
26 April 2014	(England) Troy Archibald-Henville	Red card	3 match ban	Rotherham United (plus two 2014/15 fixtures)
26 2014	(England) Nathan Thompson	Yellow card Red card	1 match ban	Rotherham United

=== Awards ===
As of 3 May 2014

Date	Player	Award
October 2013	(England) Swindon Town F.C.	LMA Performance of the Week Award (vs. Rotherham United)
March 2014	(England) Alex Pritchard	Young Player of the Year (Nominated)
March 2014	(England) Alex Pritchard	League One Player of the Year (Nominated)
2013/14	(England) Nathan Thompson	Swindon Town Player of the Season

== Transfers ==
As of 16 March 2014

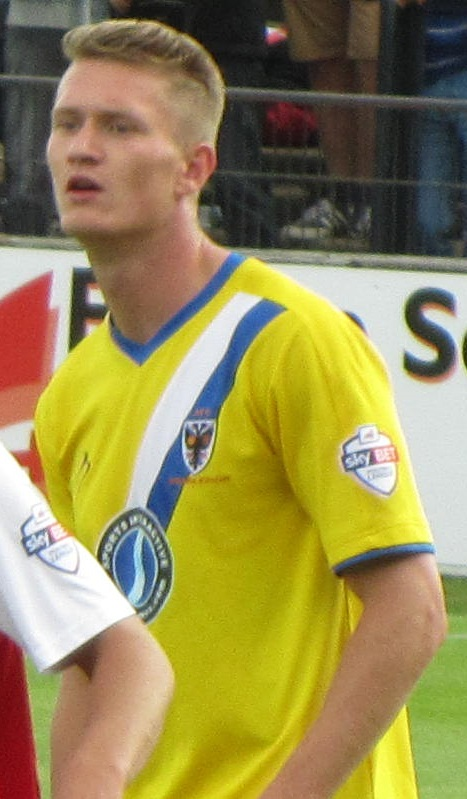
Michael Smith joined from Charlton Athletic during the January transfer window.

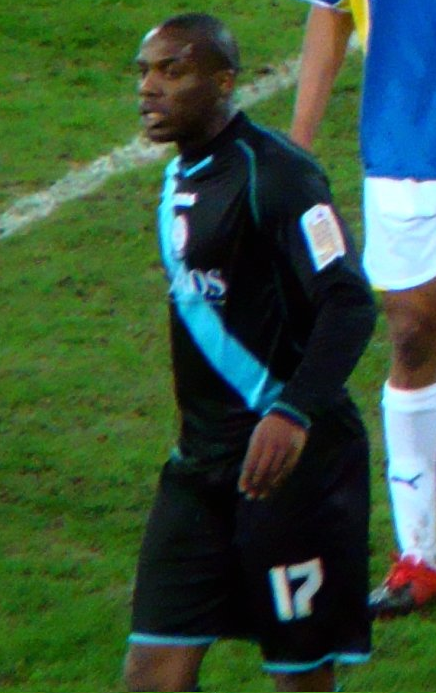
Millwall cancelled the contract of Frenchman Dany N'Guessan to allow him to join Swindon Town during the September Deadline Day.

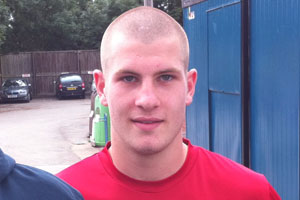
James Collins was sold to Hibs for £200,000 on 25 July.

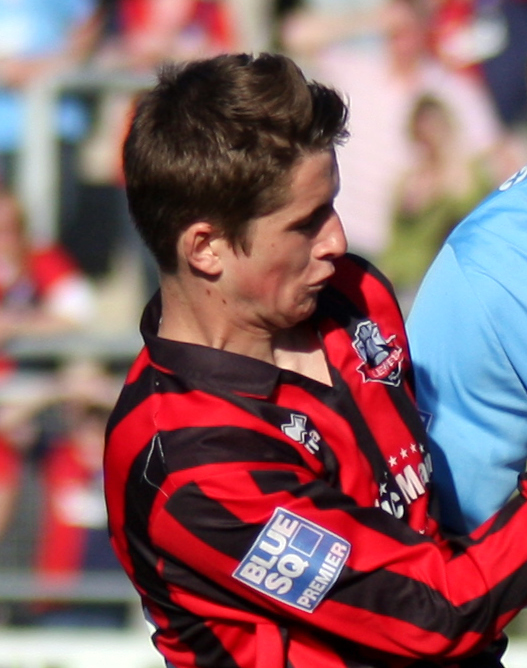
Luke Rooney was released after an unsuccessful loan spell at Crawley Town.

Players transferred in
No.	Date	Pos.	Name	From	Fee	Ref.
1	7 April 2013	MF	(England) Kayden Jackson	(England) Albion Sports	Competition Winner	
2	26 June 2013	DF	(England) Jack Barthram	(England) Tottenham Hotspur	Free	
3	26 June 2013	MF	(England) Alex Smith	(England) Fulham	Free	
4	2 July 2013	MF	(Portugal) Tijane	(Portugal) Chaves	Free	
5	9 July 2013	DF	(England) Nathan Byrne	(England) Tottenham Hotspur	Undisclosed	
6	17 July 2013	MF	(England) Harry Agombar	(Malta) Floriana	Free	
7	26 July 2013	MF	(England) Ryan Harley	(England) Brighton & Hove Albion	Free	
8	31 July 2013	MF	(England) Tyrell Belford	(England) Liverpool	Free	
9	2 August 2013	MF	(Iraq) Yaser Kasim	(England) Brighton & Hove Albion	Free	
10	2 August 2013	MF	(Brazil) Raphael	(England) Whitehawk	Free	
11	15 August 2013	FW	(England) Nile Ranger	(England) Newcastle United	Free	
12	31 August 2013	FW	(Egypt) Mohamed El-Gabbas	(Belgium) Lierse S.K.	Free	
13	31 August 2013	MF	(Australia) Massimo Luongo	(England) Tottenham Hotspur	£400,000	
14	2 September 2013	FW	(France) Dany N'Guessan	(England) Millwall	Free	
15	23 November 2013	MF	(England) Ben Gladwin	(England) Marlow	Free	
16	7 January 2014	FW	(England) George Barker	(England) Brighton & Hove Albion	Undisclosed	
17	23 January 2014	FW	(England) Michael Smith	(England) Charlton Athletic	Undisclosed	
Players transferred out
No.	Date	Pos.	Name	To	Fee	Ref.
1	11 June 2013	DF	(England) Aden Flint	(England) Bristol City	Undisclosed	
2	21 June 2013	MF	(England) Gary Roberts	(England) Chesterfield	Released	
3	1 July 2013	DF	(England) Joe Devera	(England) Portsmouth	Released	
4	1 July 2013	MF	(Scotland) Simon Ferry	(England) Portsmouth	Released	
5	1 July 2013	FW	(Italy) Raffaele De Vita	(England) Bradford City	Released	
6	1 July 2013	MF	(England) Tommy Miller	(England) Bury	Released	
7	1 July 2013	DF	(England) Chris Smith	(England) Kidsgrove Athletic	Released	
8	1 July 2013	MF	(Republic of Ireland) Alan McCormack	(England) Brentford	Free	
9	25 July 2013	FW	(Republic of Ireland) James Collins	(Scotland) Hibernian	£200,000	
10	2 September 2013	DF	(Scotland) Paul Caddis	(England) Birmingham City	Undisclosed	
11	11 December 2013	MF	(England) Luke Rooney	(England) Maidstone United	Released	
12	10 January 2014	FW	(Egypt) Mohamed El-Gabbas	(France) AC Arles-Avignon	Released	
13	2 May 2014	FW	(England) Nile Ranger	(European Union) Free Agent	Released	
Players loaned in
No.	Date from	Pos.	Name	From	Date to	Ref.
1	2 July 2013	MF	(Australia) Massimo Luongo	(England) Tottenham Hotspur	Season-long loan	
2	2 July 2013	DF	(England) Grant Hall	(England) Tottenham Hotspur	Season-long loan	
3	9 July 2013	MF	(England) Alex Pritchard	(England) Tottenham Hotspur	Season-long loan	
4	23 July 2013	MF	(England) Ryan Mason	(England) Tottenham Hotspur	Season-long loan	
5	30 August 2013	FW	(England) Nicky Ajose	(England) Peterborough United	1 January 2014	
6	24 January 2014	FW	(England) Jamie Reckord	(England) Wolverhampton Wanderers	24 April 2014	
7	8 February 2014	MF	(England) Jacob Murphy	(England) Norwich City	8 March 2014	
7	14 March 2014	DF	(England) Jack Stephens	(England) Southampton	3 May 2014	
Players loaned out
No.	Date from	Pos.	Name	To	Date to	Ref.
1	6 August 2013	MF	(England) Luke Rooney	(England) Crawley Town	1 January 2014	
2	23 August 2013	MF	(England) Kayden Jackson	(England) Swindon Supermarine	23 September 2013	
3	23 August 2013	FW	(England) Andy Williams	(England) Yeovil Town	Season-long loan	
4	26 August 2013	FW	(England) Paul Benson	(England) Luton Town	Season-long loan	
5	29 August 2013	FW	(England) Connor Waldon	(England) Frome Town	29 September 2013	
6	29 August 2013	MF	(England) Alex Ferguson	(England) Frome Town	29 September 2013	
7	30 August 2013	DF	(England) Troy Archibald-Henville	(England) Carlisle United	30 September 2013	
8	6 September 2013	GK	(England) Leigh Bedwell	(England) Banbury United	6 October 2013	
9	13 September 2013	MF	(England) Mark Francis	(England) AFC Totton	13 October 2013	
10	5 October 2013	FW	(England) Miles Storey	(England) Salisbury City	5 November 2013	
11	29 October 2013	FW	(England) Kayden Jackson	(England) Oxford City	29 November 2013	
12	31 October 2013	FW	(England) Connor Waldon	(England) Gloucester City	1 January 2014	
13	5 December 2013	MF	(England) Alex Ferguson	(England) Chippenham Town	5 January 2014	
14	23 December 2013	DF	(Wales) Aaron Oakley	(England) Chippenham Town	23 January 2014	
15	15 January 2014	FW	(England) Connor Waldon	(England) Tamworth	15 February 2014	
16	15 January 2014	MF	(England) Mark Francis	(England) Frome Town	15 February 2014	
17	14 February 2014	FW	(England) Miles Storey	(England) Shrewsbury Town	14 March 2014	
18	17 February 2014	FW	(England) Connor Waldon	(England) Gloucester City	17 March 2014	
19	7 March 2014	MF	(England) Alex Ferguson	(England) Swindon Supermarine	26 April 2014	
20	7 March 2014	DF	(England) Matt Jones	(England) Swindon Supermarine	26 April 2014	
21	7 March 2014	DF	(England) Curtis Da Costa	(England) Swindon Supermarine	26 April 2014	
22	21 March 2014	GK	(England) Leigh Bedwell	(England) Worcester City	26 April 2014	

=== Trial players ===
Nat.	Player	Signed	Ref
(England)	Aaron Ferris	✗	
(England)	Jake Johns	✗	
(England)	Jake Simpson	✗	
(Réunion)	William Gros	✗	
(Albania)	Albi Skendi	✗	
(Nigeria)	Adeyinka Talabi	✗	
(England)	Kynan Isaac	✗	
(England)	Louis Harris	✗	
(Finland)	Denis Abdulahi	✗	
(England)	Harry Smith	✓	
(France)	Yannick Nlate	✗	

Nat.	Player	Signed	Ref
(Republic of Ireland)	Daniel Devine	✗	
(Algeria)	Youssef Sofiane	✗	
(England)	Jamie Stephens	✗	
(Iraq)	Yaser Kasim	✓	
(Brazil)	Raphael Rossi Branco	✓	
(England)	Tom Pegg	✗	
(Egypt)	Mohamed El-Gabbas	✓	
(Jamaica)	Nigel Neita	✗	
(Ethiopia)	Yussuf Salvi	✗	
(Equatorial Guinea)	Sergi Perello Mba	✗	
(England)	Ben Gladwin	✓	

== Overall summary ==
=== Score overview ===
Opposition	Home score	Away score	Double
Bradford City	1–0	1–1	No
Brentford	1–0	2–3	No
Bristol City	3–2	0–0	No
Carlisle United	3–1	0–1	No
Colchester United	1–1	2–1	No
Coventry City	2–1	2–1	Yes
Crawley Town	1–1	0–0	No
Crewe Alexandra	5–0	1–1	No
Gillingham	2–2	0–2	No
Leyton Orient	1–3	0–2	No
Milton Keynes Dons	1–2	1–1	No
Notts County	2–0	0–2	No
Oldham Athletic	0–1	1–2	No
Peterborough United	2–1	0–1	No
Port Vale	5–2	3–2	Yes
Preston North End	1–0	1–2	No
Rotherham United	1–2	4–0	No
Sheffield United	2–1	0–1	No
Shrewsbury Town	3–1	0–2	No
Stevenage	1–0	0–2	No
Tranmere Rovers	1–0	2–1	Yes
Walsall	1–3	1–1	No
Wolverhampton Wanderers	1–4	2–3	No
