= Alex Pritchard =

English footballer (born 1993)

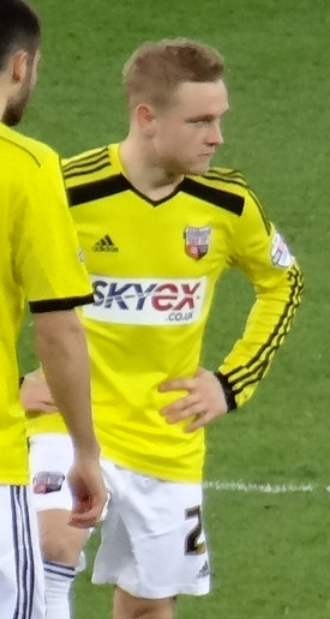
- Pritchard playing for Brentford in 2014

Personal information
- Full name: Alex William Pritchard
- Date of birth: 3 May 1993 (age 33)
- Place of birth: Orsett, England
- Height: 5 ft 7 in (1.71 m)
- Position: Attacking midfielder

Youth career
- West Ham United
- 2009–2012: Tottenham Hotspur

Senior career*
Years	Team	Apps	(Gls)
2011–2016	Tottenham Hotspur	2	(0)
2013	→ Peterborough United (loan)	6	(0)
2013–2014	→ Swindon Town (loan)	36	(6)
2014–2015	→ Brentford (loan)	45	(12)
2016	→ West Bromwich Albion (loan)	2	(0)
2016–2018	Norwich City	38	(7)
2018–2021	Huddersfield Town	80	(3)
2021–2024	Sunderland	99	(9)
2024	Birmingham City	9	(0)
2024–2025	Sivasspor	21	(0)

International career
2013	England U20	3	(0)
2014–2015	England U21	9	(0)
- * Club domestic league appearances and goals as of 12:29, 1 June 2025 (UTC)

Alex David Pritchard (born 3 May 1993) is an English professional footballer who plays as an attacking midfielder. He previously played for Tottenham Hotspur, Peterborough United, Swindon Town, Brentford, West Bromwich Albion, Norwich City, Huddersfield Town, Sunderland, Birmingham City and Sivasspor. He represented England at U20 and U21 level.

== Career ==
=== Tottenham Hotspur ===
Pritchard began his career in the academy at West Ham United, before transferring to the youth setup at Premier League side Tottenham Hotspur in June 2009. Pritchard quickly established himself in the U18 team. He received his maiden call into the first team squad for a UEFA Europa League group stage game versus PAOK on 15 September 2011. Awarded the number 54 shirt, he remained on the bench for the 0–0 draw. He was called up for another Europa League group match versus Rubin Kazan on 3 November, again remaining on the bench. Pritchard made an impact in the 2011–12 NextGen Series, where he ended up top-scorer for Spurs with four goals, three of which came against the eventual winners Inter Milan. Pritchard courted transfer interest from Premier League side Queens Park Rangers in April 2012. Pritchard added another four goals in the 2012–13 edition of the NextGen Series, one of which came in a particularly notable 4–1 away victory against Barcelona, bringing his tally to eight goals in 11 NextGen Series appearances. Following Pritchard's NextGen Series performances and with only half a year remaining on his contract, there was speculation that Spanish sides Real Madrid and Barcelona would attempt to sign him. Liverpool (with Pritchard's former Tottenham U18 manager Alex Inglethorpe on their staff) were also reported to be interested, but Pritchard ended the speculation when he signed a new two-and-a-half-year deal with Spurs on 31 January 2013. Pritchard also appeared for Tottenham's U21 team during the 2012–13 season, scoring five goals in 11 appearances to help the U21s to the U21 Premier League knockout stage final against Manchester United. Pritchard scored Tottenham's second goal and was substituted after 64 minutes for Kenny McEvoy in the 3–2 defeat.

After spending the majority of the 2013–14 season out on loan, Pritchard received his first call into the first team squad in two and a half years when he was named as a substitute for a Premier League match versus his former side West Ham United on 3 May 2014. Allotted the number 39 shirt, he remained on the bench for the 2–0 defeat. Pritchard was called up again for the final game of the season against Aston Villa and made his debut for the club when he replaced Gylfi Sigurðsson after 83 minutes of the 3–0 win. After the match, he said "it was good to get my Spurs debut under my belt and to play alongside top quality players. It was a great way to finish the season and hopefully next year I can push on again and get even more game time". On 21 August 2015, Pritchard agreed to a new four-year contract with Tottenham.

==== Peterborough United (loan) ====
On 31 January 2013, Pritchard signed on loan with Championship side Peterborough United until the end of the 2012–13 season. He had scored four goals for the Tottenham Development Squad in an 8–1 victory over Peterborough on 15 January. Awarded the number 33 shirt, Pritchard was named on the bench for a league match versus Burnley two days later. He made his professional debut when he replaced Nathaniel Knight-Percival after 55 minutes of the 1–0 defeat. He came on again as a substitute in the following game against Leicester City, but lasted just 16 minutes before suffering torn ligaments in his ankle. Pritchard returned to Tottenham Hotspur for treatment and didn't appear again for the Posh until a late cameo in a 3–2 victory over Watford on 13 April. He made just six appearances for the club before returning to White Hart Lane at the end of the season.

==== Swindon Town (loan) ====
On 9 July 2013, Pritchard joined League One side Swindon Town on a season long loan deal, linking up with fellow Tottenham loanees Massimo Luongo, Grant Hall, Ryan Mason and former teammates Nathan Byrne and Jack Barthram at the County Ground. Wearing the number 11 shirt, Pritchard scored his first goal for the club on 27 August, in a 2–0 win against Queens Park Rangers in the League Cup second round. Pritchard's form led to interest from Championship sides Huddersfield Town, Blackburn Rovers and League One leaders Wolverhampton Wanderers in January 2013. Pritchard was sent off for the first time in his career in a league match versus Bristol City on 15 March, receiving a straight red card for a shove on Wade Elliott. Earlier in the season, manager Mark Cooper stated that Pritchard would need to "curb his temper", after he picked up five bookings in seven league matches. Pritchard won rave reviews for his performances during the season, receiving nominations for the League One Player of the Year and Football League Young Player of the Year awards. Of the nominations, he said "I'm absolutely chuffed to be nominated, I've worked hard all season and with the amount of players of my age doing so well, it's great to get that recognition". Pritchard was a key player for Swindon over the course of the 2013–14 season, making 44 appearances and scoring eight goals. Looking back on his time with the Robins, Pritchard said "it was great for me to be playing first team football at Swindon this season, I needed to get out and play competitively and I loved every minute of it".

==== Brentford (loan) ====
After transfer interest from Wolverhampton Wanderers and Wigan Athletic, Pritchard signed for Championship side Brentford on a season-long loan on 17 July 2014. Manager Mark Warburton (who helped create the now-defunct NextGen Series) said Pritchard "is very good tactically and technically with excellent dead ball delivery. He showed his quality while he was on loan at Swindon last year. Alex will add to the quality in our squad". Pritchard scored two goals in a 3–2 pre-season friendly victory over Nice at Griffin Park on 26 July. He made his competitive debut for the club on the opening day of the 2014–15 season, lasting 79 minutes of a 1–1 draw with Charlton Athletic before being replaced by Tommy Smith. Pritchard scored his first competitive goal for the Bees with the equaliser in a 2–1 victory over Blackpool on 19 August. He scored his second goal a 3–1 win over Reading on 4 October, slotting the ball through Adam Federici's legs after Andre Gray had slipped. On 24 January 2015, Pritchard's performance and winning penalty in a 2–1 win over Norwich City earned him a place in the Football League Team of the Week. Another good performance and a goal in a 3–1 victory over AFC Bournemouth in late February saw him named in the Football League Team of the Week for the second time of the season. Pritchard went on a run of four goals in seven games in March and April, but his season ended in disappointment with defeat to Middlesbrough in the playoff semi-finals. He made 47 appearances and scored 12 goals. Pritchard won much recognition for his performances during the 2014–15 season, winning a place in the Championship PFA Team of the Year, the Brentford Players' and Social Media Player of the Year awards, a nomination for the London Football Awards Young Player of the Year award and separate awards for Player of the Year from the Irish and Italian Brentford supporters' clubs. He was named eighth best Championship player at the 2015 Football League Awards and one of the top 20 players in the Football League and 'FL Wonderkid' by FourFourTwo and Match respectively.

==== West Bromwich Albion (loan) ====
On 1 February 2016, Pritchard signed for West Bromwich Albion on loan. He made his debut in the 1–0 loss to Newcastle United.

=== Norwich City ===
On 4 August 2016, Pritchard joined Championship club Norwich City on a four-year deal for an undisclosed fee. However some news agencies such as The Mirror have reported the fee as being £8,000,000. Pritchard scored his first goal for Norwich in an EFL Cup tie against Leeds United on 25 October 2016. Pritchard scored the final goal in a 5–0 victory over one of his old loan clubs, Brentford, on 3 December 2016.

In the 2017–18 season, Pritchard made nine appearances for Norwich in all competitions, scoring once, after returning from a knee injury that had sidelined him at the start of the season.

=== Huddersfield Town ===
On 12 January 2018, Pritchard joined Premier League club Huddersfield Town for an undisclosed fee, signing a three-and-a-half-year contract with the Yorkshire club. later estimated to amount to 11M. His debut versus West Ham United ended in a 4–1 home defeat. On 11 February, he scored his first Premier League goal in a 4–1 home win over Bournemouth, while also winning a penalty.

=== Sunderland ===
In July 2021 he joined Sunderland. He scored his first goal for the club in a 1–1 draw with Shrewsbury Town on 23 November 2021. On 26 January 2024, Pritchard notified Sunderland that he would not be available for selection (starting with the fixture against Stoke City) and wishes to leave with immediate effect.

=== Birmingham City ===
On 1 February 2024, Pritchard signed for Championship club Birmingham City for an undisclosed fee on a two-and-a-half-year contract. The move reunited him with Tony Mowbray, under whose management he had played at Sunderland. By the time he recovered from a calf injury sustained on debut, Mowbray had taken medical leave, and a further calf strain added to a surfeit of midfielders meant he took little part in Birmingham's unsuccessful relegation battle.

=== Sivasspor ===
Pritchard signed for Turkish Süper Lig club Sivasspor on 1 July 2024; the fee was undisclosed.

== International career ==
On 27 May 2013, Pritchard was named in manager Peter Taylor's 21-man squad for the 2013 U20 World Cup. He made his debut on 16 June, in a 3–0 pre-tournament friendly win over Uruguay. He made two appearances in the group stage of the U20 World Cup, against Chile and Egypt. Pritchard received his first call into the U21 squad on 28 August 2014 and made his debut in a 1–0 2015 European U21 Championship qualifying victory over Lithuania on 5 September, coming on for Nathan Redmond after 79 minutes. Pritchard made his first U21 start on his fourth cap, starting in a friendly versus France on 17 November. He was replaced by Danny Ings at half time during the 3–2 defeat. In mid-December, Pritchard received a 2014 England U21 Player of the Year award nomination.

== Personal life ==
Pritchard was born in the village of Orsett, and grew up in Thurrock, Essex. He attended Belhus Chase Specialist Humanities College in Aveley prior to signing for West Ham United.

== Career statistics ==
As of match played 31 May 2025

Appearances and goals by club, season, and competition
Club	Season	League			National cup (Note: Includes FA Cup, Turkish Cup)		League Cup		Other		Total	
Club	Season	Division	Apps	Goals	Apps	Goals	Apps	Goals	Apps	Goals	Apps	Goals
Tottenham Hotspur	2012–13	Premier League	0	0	0	0	0	0	0	0	0	0
Tottenham Hotspur	2013–14	Premier League	1	0	0	0	0	0	0	0	1	0
Tottenham Hotspur	2014–15	Premier League	0	0	0	0	0	0	0	0	0	0
Tottenham Hotspur	2015–16	Premier League	1	0	0	0	0	0	0	0	1	0
Tottenham Hotspur	Total		2	0	0	0	0	0	0	0	2	0
Peterborough United (loan)	2012–13	Championship	6	0	—		—		—		6	0
Swindon Town (loan)	2013–14	League One	36	6	1	0	3	1	4 (Note: Appearances in Football League Trophy)	1	44	8
Brentford (loan)	2014–15	Championship	45	12	0	0	0	0	2 (Note: Appearances in Championship play-offs)	0	47	12
West Brom (loan)	2015–16	Premier League	2	0	1	0	0	0	—		3	0
Norwich City	2016–17	Championship	30	6	2	0	2	1	—		34	7
Norwich City	2017–18	Championship	8	1	1	0	0	0	0	0	9	1
Norwich City	Total		38	7	3	0	2	1	0	0	43	8
Huddersfield Town	2017–18	Premier League	14	1	0	0	—		—		14	1
Huddersfield Town	2018–19	Premier League	30	2	1	0	1	0	—		32	2
Huddersfield Town	2019–20	Championship	18	0	0	0	0	0	—		18	0
Huddersfield Town	2020–21	Championship	18	0	0	0	1	0	—		19	0
Huddersfield Town	Total		80	3	1	0	2	0	0	0	83	3
Sunderland	2021–22	League One	36	4	1	0	5	0	3	0	45	4
Sunderland	2022–23	Championship	40	4	1	0	0	0	1	0	42	4
Sunderland	2023–24	Championship	23	1	1	0	1	0	0	0	25	1
Sunderland	Total		99	9	3	0	6	0	4	0	112	9
Birmingham City	2023–24	Championship	9	0	—		—		—		9	0
Sivasspor	2024–25	Süper Lig	20	0	4	0	—		0	0	24	0
Career total			337	37	13	0	13	2	10	1	373	40

== Honours ==
Sunderland

- EFL League One play-offs: 2022

Individual

- PFA Team of the Year: 2014–15 Championship
- Brentford Players' Player of the Year: 2014–15
