= Alex Smith (footballer, born 1991) =

British footballer (born 1991)

Personal information
- Full name: Alex Ralph Smith
- Date of birth: 31 October 1991 (age 35)
- Place of birth: Croydon, England
- Height: 1.77 m (5 ft 9 1/2 in)
- Position: Midfielder

Team information
- Current team: Hastings United

Youth career
- 2002–2009: Fulham

Senior career*
Years	Team	Apps	(Gls)
2009–2013	Fulham	1	(0)
2012–2013	→ Leyton Orient (loan)	2	(0)
2013	→ Stevenage (loan)	0	(0)
2013–2014	Swindon Town	8	(1)
2014–2015	Yeovil Town	6	(0)
2016	Woking	7	(0)
2016–2017	Eastbourne Borough	16	(2)
2018–	Hastings United	0	(0)
- * Club domestic league appearances and goals as of 30 April 2017 (UTC)

Alex Ralph Smith (born 31 October 1991) is an English footballer who plays as a midfielder for Hastings United.

== Club career ==
Smith, a product of the Fulham academy spent eleven seasons with Fulham and signed his first professional contract in 2009. Smith made his senior début for Fulham in a Premier League match against West Bromwich Albion at Craven Cottage, coming on as a substitute for Damien Duff at the end of the game during injury time. Fulham won the game 3–0.

On 22 November 2012, Fulham confirmed that Smith would be joining Leyton Orient until 2 January 2013. He made his Orient debut on 2 December in the FA Cup second round tie away to Alfreton Town.

Smith was loaned out again in March 2013, this time joining League One side Stevenage on a one-month loan deal.

Smith was one of twelve players released by Fulham at the end of the 2012–2013 Premier League season.

Smith signed for League One club Swindon Town on a one-year contract on 25 June 2013, with the option of a further year. Smith revealed he turned moves from Europe to join Swindon Town. Smith made his debut in the opening game of the season, playing as a left-back position, in a 1–0 loss against Peterborough United. However, Smith sustained an knee injury during a match against Queens Park Rangers in the second round of League Cup. After an operation, Smith would be likely to be out until Christmas. However, Manager Mark Cooper believes Smith doesn't expect for Smith to return until "well into the new year". After a six-month out, Smith finally made his return in 0–0 draw against Bristol City on 15 March 2014. Smith scored his first goal for the club in a 2–1 win over Tranmere Rovers on 25 March 2014. His goal against Tranmere Rovers was placed nine as the top ten best Swindon Town goal of 2013–14 season.

After a season with Swindon Town, Smith was among ten players to be released.

On 29 November 2014, Smith signed for League One side Yeovil Town on a month contract following a successful trial with the Glovers. Smith was released by Yeovil at the end of the 2014–15 season following their relegation to League Two.

On 14 January 2016, Smith joined National League side Woking on a six-month deal until the end of the season. On 26 January 2016, Smith made his Woking debut in a 3–1 defeat to Altrincham, replacing Bruno Andrade in the 68th minute. On 30 June 2016, Smith was released at the end of his contract.

In August 2016, Smith joined National League South side Eastbourne Borough.

On 19 May 2018, following a lengthy spell out on the sidelines, Smith returned to the game and joined Isthmian League side Hastings United.

== Club statistics ==
As of 30 April 2017.

Appearances and goals by club, season and competition
Club	Season	League			FA Cup		League Cup		Other		Total	
Club	Season	Division	Apps	Goals	Apps	Goals	Apps	Goals	Apps	Goals	Apps	Goals
Fulham	2012–13	Premier League	1	0	0	0	0	0	—		1	0
Leyton Orient (loan)	2012–13	League One	2	0	1	0	0	0	1 (Note: Appearance(s) in Football League Trophy)	0	4	0
Stevenage (loan)	2012–13	League One	0	0	0	0	0	0	0	0	0	0
Swindon Town	2013–14	League One	8	1	0	0	2	0	0	0	10	1
Yeovil Town	2014–15	League One	6	0	0	0	0	0	0	0	6	0
Woking	2015–16	National League	7	0	0	0	—		1 (Note: Appearance(s) in FA Trophy)	0	8	0
Eastbourne Borough	2016–17	National League South	16	2	2	0	—		2	0	20	2
Career total			40	3	3	0	2	0	4	0	49	3
