= Wes Foderingham =

English footballer

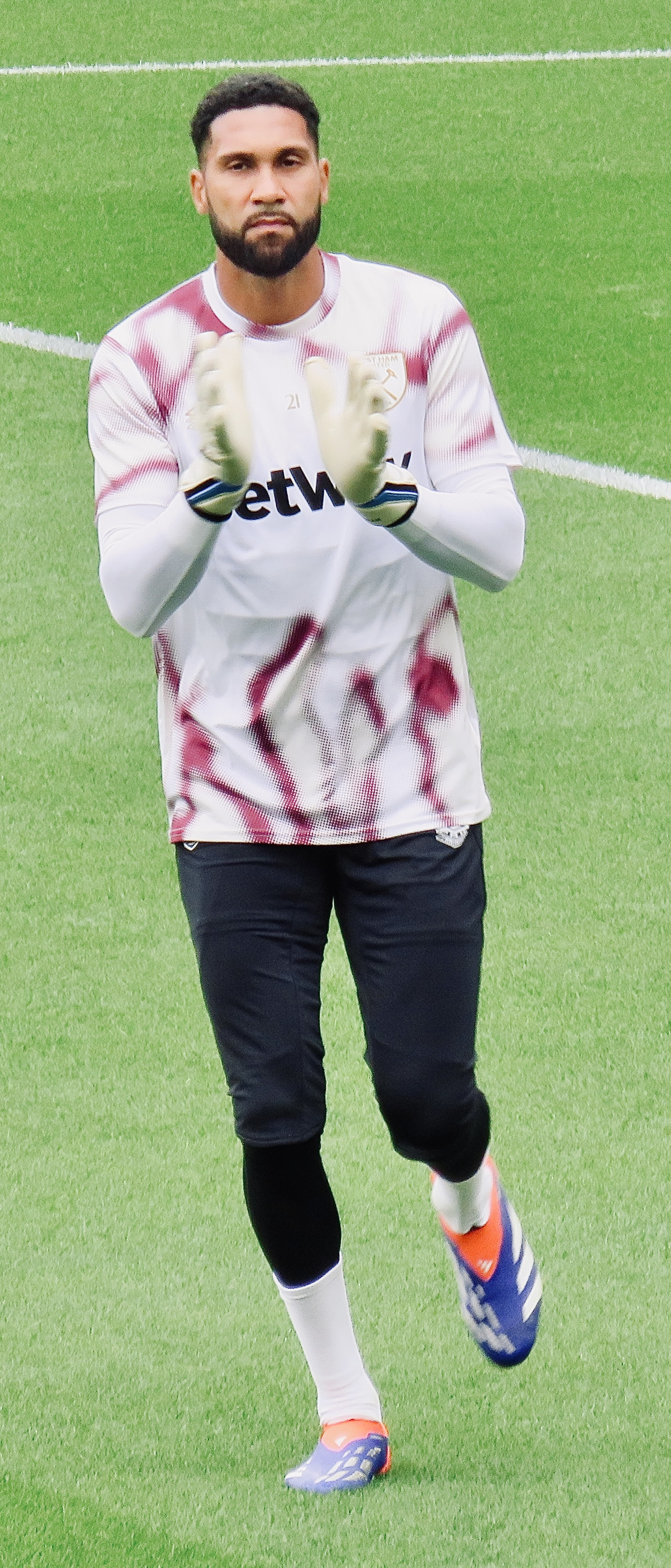
- Foderingham warming up for West Ham United in 2024

Personal information
- Full name: Wesley Andrew Foderingham
- Date of birth: 14 January 1991 (age 35)
- Place of birth: Hammersmith, London, England
- Height: 1.85 m (6 ft 1 in)
- Position: Goalkeeper

Team information
- Current team: Aris Limassol
- Number: 25

Youth career
- 2000–2009: Fulham

Senior career*
Years	Team	Apps	(Gls)
2009–2010	Fulham	0	(0)
2010	→ Bromley (loan)	9	(0)
2010–2012	Crystal Palace	0	(0)
2010	→ Bromley (loan)	13	(0)
2011	→ Boreham Wood (loan)	5	(0)
2011	→ Histon (loan)	9	(0)
2011–2012	→ Swindon Town (loan)	12	(0)
2012–2015	Swindon Town	152	(0)
2015–2020	Rangers	112	(0)
2020–2024	Sheffield United	102	(0)
2024–2025	West Ham United	0	(0)
2025–	Aris Limassol	13	(0)

International career
2006–2007	England U16	5	(0)
2007–2008	England U17	4	(0)
2009–2010	England U19	3	(0)
- * Club domestic league appearances and goals as of 20 February 2026

Wesley Andrew Foderingham (born 14 January 1991) is an English professional footballer who plays as a goalkeeper for Cypriot First Division club Aris Limassol. He is a former England U19 international.

Foderingham was with Fulham and Crystal Palace as a young player, but did not make a league appearance for either club. After playing on loan for a number of non-league clubs, he signed for Swindon Town and made over 160 appearances in the Football League for the Wiltshire club. In July 2015, Foderingham signed a three-year contract with Scottish club Rangers upon being released by Swindon Town.

== Club career ==
=== Early career ===
Foderingham was born in Hammersmith, London. He started with Fulham in their youth squad before moving on loan to Bromley. After being released by Fulham, Foderingham signed his first professional contract with Crystal Palace in August 2010, before going on loan with Histon in March 2011.

=== Swindon Town ===
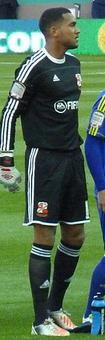
Foderingham playing for Swindon Town in 2013

In October 2011 Foderingham signed on loan with League Two side Swindon Town until January 2012 to cover for injured keeper Phil Smith, making his debut on 15 October 2011 against Accrington Stanley. During his time on loan in 15 games for Swindon, Foderingham conceded just six goals and kept nine clean sheets. This prompted Swindon manager Paolo Di Canio to buy the keeper for an undisclosed sum on 6 January 2012, on a contract running until July 2014. Foderingham would keep a total of 24 clean sheets across all competitions and lose just four of his 33 league games as Swindon won the 2011–12 League Two title.

Foderingham began the 2012–13 season with four consecutive clean sheets, before beating Premier League team Stoke City 4–3 after extra time in the League Cup. However, in the following game against Preston North End, he was substituted for Leigh Bedwell after 21 minutes with Swindon two goals down. Foderingham reacted angrily to his substitution, kicking a water bottle as he left the pitch, before storming down the tunnel. Manager Di Canio publicly criticised Foderingham after the game and claimed that if he did not apologise for his actions, he would be "out" of the club. Foderingham later issued an apology, which was accepted by Di Canio.

Foderingham was released by Swindon Town at the end of the 2014–15 season upon the expiry of his contract.

=== Rangers ===
On 3 July 2015, Foderingham signed a three-year contract with then Scottish Championship club Rangers. He made his debut for the Ibrox club in a 6–2 win against Hibernian in the first round of the Scottish Challenge Cup and was Rangers' first choice goalkeeper ahead of Cammy Bell under new Rangers manager Mark Warburton. On 19 July 2016, Foderingham extended his contract with Rangers for another year until 2019. In July 2018, under new Manager Steven Gerrard, Foderingham became second-choice goalkeeper largely due to the return of Allan McGregor to the Rangers team after a six-year absence. Foderingham made his first appearance of the season for Rangers in a 3–1 win over Kilmarnock in the Scottish League Cup. On 19 May 2020 it was announced that he would leave Rangers at the end of May when his contract ended.

=== Sheffield United ===
Foderingham joined Premier League club Sheffield United on 17 July 2020 on a three-year contract. During the 2021/2022 season, under manager Paul Heckingbottom, Foderingham established himself as the club's first-choice goalkeeper.

In the 2022–2023 season Foderingham kept 18 clean sheets in 44 games as Sheffield United secured promotion back to the Premier League.

In September 2023, Sheffield United received racist abuse and threats aimed at Foderingham following the club's 2–1 away Premier League defeat by Tottenham Hotspur. The following week he was in goal for Sheffield United's record defeat, an 8–0 home loss to Newcastle United. The win also matched Newcastle's record Premier League win.

Foderingham was released by Sheffield United at the end of the 2023–24 season.

=== West Ham United ===
On 26 June 2024, Premier League club West Ham United announced the signing of Foderingham for a free transfer and on a two-year contract.

=== Aris Limassol ===
On 9 September 2025, Foderingham joined Cypriot First Division club Aris Limassol.

== International career ==
Foderingham has represented England at various levels including England U19s.

He is eligible to represent Jamaica through his father.

== Personal life ==
Born in England, Foderingham is of Barbados and English descent. He is a supporter of Newcastle United.

== Career statistics ==
As of 21 January 2026

Appearances and goals by club, season and competition
Club	Season	League			National cup (Note: Includes FA Cup, Cypriot Cup)		League cup (Note: Includes EFL Cup)		Other		Total	
Club	Season	Division	Apps	Goals	Apps	Goals	Apps	Goals	Apps	Goals	Apps	Goals
Fulham	2009–10	Premier League	0	0	0	0	0	0	0	0	0	0
Bromley (loan)	2009–10	Conference South	9	0	—		—		—		9	0
Crystal Palace	2010–11	Championship	0	0	0	0	0	0	—		0	0
Crystal Palace	2011–12	Championship	0	0	0	0	0	0	—		0	0
Crystal Palace	Total		0	0	0	0	0	0	—		0	0
Bromley (loan)	2010–11	Conference South	13	0	4	0	—		1 (Note: Appearances in Kent Senior Cup)	0	18	0
Boreham Wood (loan)	2010–11	Conference South	5	0	0	0	—		0	0	5	0
Histon (loan)	2010–11	Conference Premier	9	0	—		—		—		9	0
Swindon Town	2011–12 (Note: Part of this season was spent on loan from Crystal Palace)	League Two	33	0	4	0	0	0	4 (Note: Appearances in Football League Trophy)	0	41	0
Swindon Town	2012–13	League One	46	0	1	0	4	0	3 (Note: One appearance in Football League Trophy, two appearances in League One play-offs)	0	54	0
Swindon Town	2013–14	League One	41	0	0	0	3	0	3	0	47	0
Swindon Town	2014–15	League One	44	0	1	0	2	0	3 (Note: Appearances in League One play-offs)	0	50	0
Swindon Town	Total		164	0	6	0	9	0	13	0	192	0
Rangers	2015–16	Scottish Championship	36	0	6	0	3	0	5 (Note: Appearances in Scottish Challenge Cup)	0	50	0
Rangers	2016–17	Scottish Premiership	37	0	4	0	2	0	—		43	0
Rangers	2017–18	Scottish Premiership	33	0	2	0	0	0	2 (Note: Appearances in UEFA Europa League)	0	37	0
Rangers	2018–19	Scottish Premiership	4	0	2	0	2	0	0	0	8	0
Rangers	2019–20	Scottish Premiership	2	0	1	0	1	0	1	0	5	0
Rangers	Total		112	0	15	0	8	0	8	0	143	0
Sheffield United	2020–21	Premier League	0	0	0	0	1	0	—		1	0
Sheffield United	2021–22	Championship	32	0	1	0	1	0	2 (Note: Appearances in Championship play-offs)	0	36	0
Sheffield United	2022–23	Championship	40	0	3	0	1	0	—		44	0
Sheffield United	2023–24	Premier League	30	0	0	0	0	0	—		30	0
Sheffield United	Total		102	0	4	0	3	0	2	0	111	0
West Ham United	2024–25	Premier League	0	0	0	0	0	0	—		0	0
Aris Limassol	2025–26	Cypriot First Division	11	0	1	0	—		—		12	0
Career total			425	0	30	0	20	0	24	0	499	0

== Honours ==
Swindon Town

- Football League Two: 2011–12
- Football League Trophy runner-up: 2011–12

Rangers

- Scottish Championship: 2015–16
- Scottish Challenge Cup: 2015–16

Individual

- PFA Team of the Year: 2012–13 League One
- Football League Two Golden Glove (Yearly): 2011–12
- Premier League Save of the Month: December 2023
- Football League Two Golden Glove (Monthly): April 2012
