= Nile Ranger =

English footballer

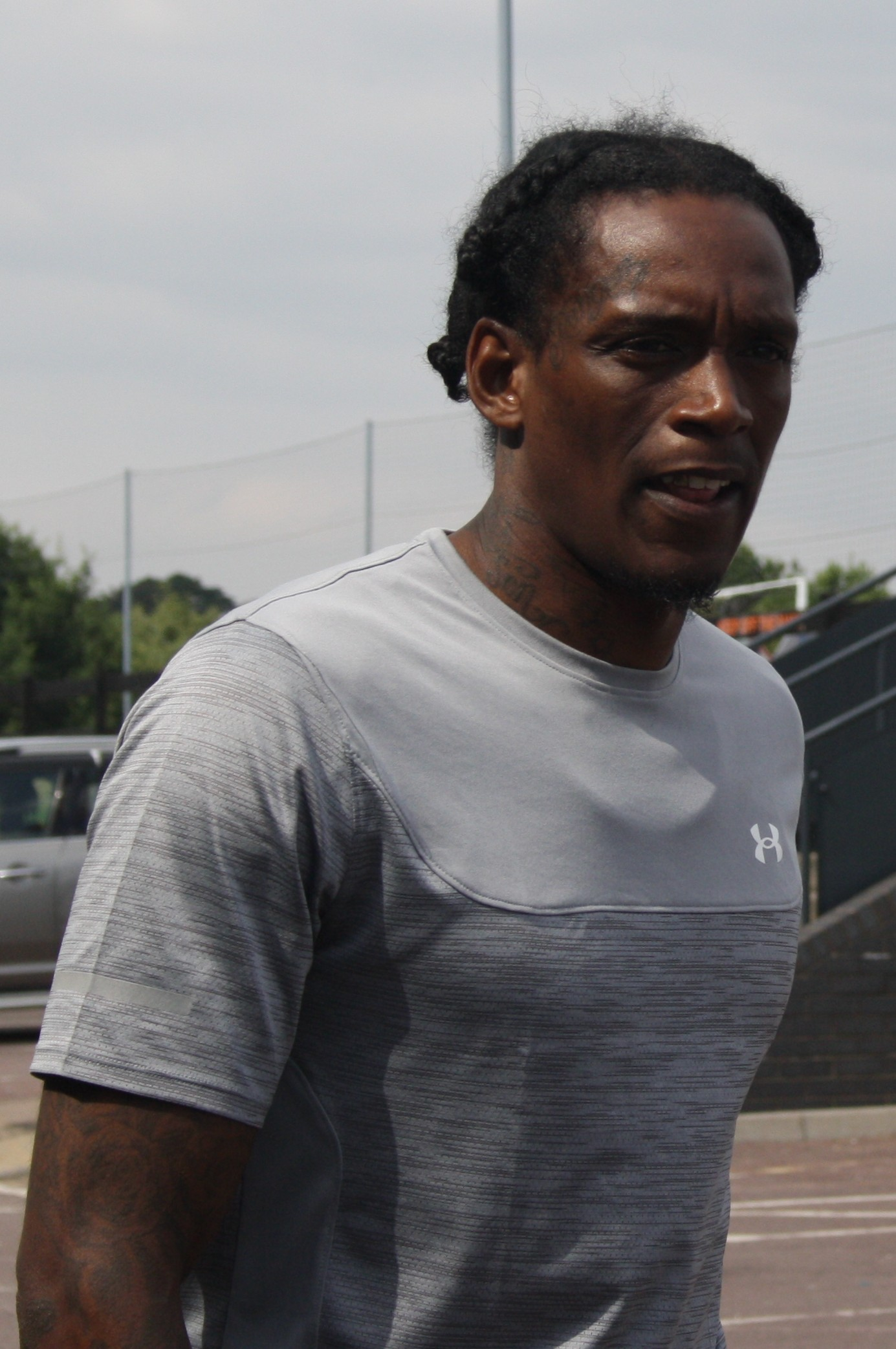

Personal information
- Full name: Nile Ranger
- Date of birth: 11 April 1991 (age 35)
- Place of birth: Wood Green, England
- Height: 1.88 m (6 ft 2 in)
- Position: Striker

Team information
- Current team: AFC Whyteleafe

Youth career
- Crystal Palace
- Haringey Borough
- Romford
- 2007–2008: Southampton
- 2008–2009: Newcastle United

Senior career*
Years	Team	Apps	(Gls)
2009–2013	Newcastle United	51	(2)
2011	→ Barnsley (loan)	5	(0)
2012	→ Sheffield Wednesday (loan)	8	(2)
2013–2014	Swindon Town	23	(8)
2014–2016	Blackpool	14	(2)
2016–2018	Southend United	45	(10)
2020–2021	Spalding United	1	(1)
2021	Southend United	1	(0)
2021–2022	Boreham Wood	0	(0)
2024–2025	Kettering Town	40	(15)
2025–2026	Wellingborough Town	12	(1)
2026	Chatham Town	14	(5)
2026–	AFC Whyteleafe	1	(0)

International career^{‡}
2009–2010	England U19	11	(6)
- * Club domestic league appearances and goals as of 23:30, 15 August 2026 (UTC) ‡ National team caps and goals as of 15:18, 4 January 2018 (UTC)

Nile Ranger (born 11 April 1991) is an English professional footballer who is a striker who last played for Isthmian League Premier Division club AFC Whyteleafe.

Previously with Crystal Palace and Southampton, Ranger finished his youth career at Newcastle United, where he made his professional debut and was part of their team which won the Football League Championship in 2009–10. Later on in his spell at St James's Park, he was loaned to Barnsley and Sheffield Wednesday. He played international football for England U19.

After leaving Newcastle by mutual consent in 2013, he went on to play for Swindon Town, Blackpool and Southend United in the English Football League, with his spells at all three clubs being hindered by disciplinary issues including multiple absences from training. Ranger, who was incarcerated for involvement in armed robbery as a teenager, served a prison sentence for fraud in 2017.

== Early life ==
Born in Wood Green in North London, Ranger attended Alexandra Park School. He began his football career at Crystal Palace's academy, before being released at the age of 12. Following his time at Crystal Palace, Ranger played in the youth systems at Haringey Borough and Romford. He was with the Protec Football Development School for a few weeks before being scouted by Southampton.

His career was almost over before it began, as whilst playing for the club he was sentenced to 11 weeks in a Young Offender's Institute for his part in an armed street robbery in Muswell Hill committed before signing for the club. He returned to Southampton after completing his sentence, but was eventually released as a player with a bad reputation after he stole boots, training kit and a staff member's box of chocolates. He was offered terms by Swindon Town after a successful trial before Newcastle United signed him.

== Club career ==
=== Newcastle United ===
In July 2008, Ranger joined Newcastle United at the invitation of director of football Dennis Wise. Ranger made his academy debut against Leicester City on 23 August 2008 and made his debut for the reserve team against Sunderland at St James' Park on 1 September 2008. He impressed hugely in these levels, finishing with 15 goals for the Under-18s and seven for the reserves in his first season on Tyneside. That resulted in his winning the "Wor Jackie Milburn Trophy" in 2009. He was rewarded by then-manager Alan Shearer with a new and improved three-and-a-half-year contract.

Ranger's senior debut came as an added-time substitute for Shola Ameobi against West Bromwich Albion in the Championship on 8 August 2009. He made his first senior start against Leicester City on 31 August, where he won the man of the match award; he played just over 84 minutes before being substituted and received a standing ovation from fans. He scored his first senior goal for the club in a 2–0 win over Coventry City on 9 December, after coming on as a substitute for Peter Løvenkrands. Ranger scored the second of his two league goals that season in a 2–0 home win against Crystal Palace on 27 January 2010, as Newcastle ended the season as champions and were promoted to the Premier League.

After appearing as an unused substitute in the first two Premier League games for Newcastle, he started in the Football League Cup wins over Accrington Stanley and Chelsea. He scored the first equalising goal in the game at Stamford Bridge on 22 September 2010, appearing in a right-wing berth, as Newcastle went on to triumph 4–3. He made his Premier League debut on 16 October, coming off the bench in the 89th minute in a 2–2 draw against Wigan Athletic. He made a host of substitute appearances for Newcastle after that, notably in the 1–0 away win to Arsenal, when he turned past Arsenal defender Laurent Koscielny and was through on goal before the latter tugged him down and received a red card. Ranger signed a new 5 1/2-year contract on 3 December 2010, keeping him at the club until 2016. He started several games after, as the club's only fit striker after the sale of Andy Carroll to Liverpool and injuries to Shola Ameobi and Leon Best.

On 21 November 2011, having failed to appear for Newcastle that season, Ranger signed on loan for Championship club Barnsley until 14 January 2012. In his fifth game for Barnsley, a 1–0 away defeat to West Ham United on 17 December 2011, Ranger injured his foot. His loan was cut short and he returned to Newcastle. On 22 March 2012, he joined Sheffield Wednesday in League One on loan until the end of the 2011–12 season.

On 19 January 2013, Ranger criticised the Newcastle fans on Twitter for booing the team off after a 2–1 home loss to fellow strugglers Reading. He left Newcastle by mutual consent on 1 March 2013.

=== Swindon Town ===
Ranger joined Swindon Town of League One on a one-year deal, with the option of a second, on 16 August 2013. He was signed despite his ongoing rape case.

Ranger scored his first goal for Swindon on 27 August against Queens Park Rangers in the League Cup and his first league goal in the following game four days later, a 5–0 home win against Crewe Alexandra. He was a regular in the side until early November, scoring four more goals.

On 14 November he failed to report to the club for training after being given a period of leave. He played one more game before again failing to turn up at the club. Manager Mark Cooper decided Ranger would not appear until he showed "respect for the team". In December Cooper said he would offload Ranger if he failed to train and because of his disciplinary record. On 3 January 2014, Swindon Town chairman Lee Power confirmed in a press conference that the club would be meeting with Ranger and his management in the following days to confirm his sacking due to his disrespect shown towards the club through constant absence during training. Power said "I'm the chairman of the club and I've got to do what's best for the club. Unfortunately, what's best for the club is having to sit down with Nile and talk about parting ways. While this is ongoing Nile is not training with the squad." He was soon recalled to the squad, scoring in a 2–1 win against Peterborough United on 11 January. He continued to play throughout January and early February, scoring three more goals. On 14 February he suffered a hamstring tear in a game against Colchester United, his last game for Swindon.

He had played 28 games in all competitions, scoring ten goals. His time with the club had been beset with disciplinary problems and issues with his private life and on 2 May 2014, Ranger and Swindon Town mutually agreed to terminate his contract with immediate effect.

=== Blackpool ===
On 16 August 2014, Ranger signed for Blackpool of the Championship on a one-year deal. He scored against Millwall on 30 August and against Leeds United on 8 November, both in defeats. After two more league appearances, he went AWOL after being left out of the squad to face Birmingham City in early December. He claimed he had to return to London for "family issues". In late January 2015, Blackpool began to fine the striker for each day he was absent. In May 2015, Blackpool released 17 players following their relegation. They took up an option to extend Ranger's contract for another year. Despite saying he would return to the club for pre-season training in preparation for the 2015–16 season, he failed to do so until 28 July, by which point Blackpool had played four friendlies.

Ranger issued an apology to the club in September 2015:

I have seen two of my good friends pass away. Whilst overcoming this it has made me realise life is really short and I have really been taking things for granted. I would like to use this opportunity to thank Southampton, Newcastle, Swindon and Blackpool for giving me the chance to experience the dream of being a professional footballer. To add to this I would like to apologise to everyone at these clubs including management, players, staff and fans. I should have given more and been a better role model. I would also like to add I am sorry to my current team-mates at Blackpool for being missing for a long period of time and not attending pre-season and putting in the hard work during this time. Truth be told I'm just a young boy who has been living the dream and playing a game which I do love and miss deeply, and hope that one day I will be able to get back on a pitch and play because life is really too short.

On 2 February 2016, Blackpool announced that Ranger had left the club.

=== Southend United ===
On 3 August 2016, Southend United announced that they had signed Ranger on a one-year contract. He made his debut 13 days later in a 3–0 win at Sheffield United, his first professional match since November 2014, but was substituted with an injury halfway through the first half. On 12 November, Ranger scored his first goals for the Shrimpers, one in each half of a 4–1 win over Bury at Gigg Lane. On 1 December Ranger signed a new contract with Southend, committing him to the club until 2020.

Ranger began the 2017–18 season having served time in prison for online banking fraud. On his release he was subject to a 7pm curfew meaning he could not play games with an evening kick-off. He was also electronically tagged. On 22 September the tag was removed and Ranger was included in the squad to play an away game at Fleetwood. He scored in a 4–2 win; his controversial goal celebration involving removing his boot and using it to mimic the action of someone using a machine gun.

Ranger's contract with the club was terminated on 4 January 2018 because of "recurring disciplinary issues".

=== Spalding United ===
On 29 October 2020, after a stint at Barnet Sunday League side AC United, Ranger signed for Northern Premier League Division One South East club Spalding United. Two days later, he made his debut against Belper Town, scoring one and assisting another in the process.

=== Return to Southend United ===
In February 2021, Ranger returned to Southend United, signing on a month-by-month contract. His debut game on 27 February, during his second spell with Southend, lasted only 11 minutes. Coming on as a second-half substitute against Salford City, Ranger sustained a groin injury and was himself substituted off. His injury was so severe that he was reported as being unlikely to play for the remainder of the season. In May 2021, following Southend's relegation into the National League, manager Phil Brown revealed Southend had "severed all ties" with Ranger after the striker failed to attend physiotherapy sessions. Ranger himself claimed that Southend were not funding his travel to the sessions.

=== Boreham Wood ===
In December 2021, Ranger signed for National League club Boreham Wood. His contract length was 'undisclosed'. He made his Boreham Wood debut on 6 December coming on as a late substitute in a 4–0 FA Cup second round win against St Albans City.

=== Kettering Town ===
On 9 September 2024, Ranger appeared for Kettering Town Town in a 2–1 win against St Ives Town in the Southern League Premier Division Central, the seventh tier of English football. Kettering manager Richard Lavery confirmed to the press that Ranger had signed a deal with the club. In the next match, on 14 September against Cleethorpes Town in the FA Cup second qualifying round, Ranger scored the only goal as Kettering progressed to the next round.

On 2 November 2024, Ranger scored in the second minute of extra-time to give Kettering a 2–1 win against League One Northampton Town, four divisions higher in the football pyramid, in the first round of the 2024–25 FA Cup. The following week, having scored seven goals in ten games, Ranger signed a one-year extension to his contract with Kettering Town.

He left the club in October 2025.

=== Wellingborough Town ===
On 17 October 2025, Ranger joined Northern Premier League Division One Midlands club Wellingborough Town. During his time at Wellingborough, Ranger scored once in 12 league appearances.

=== Chatham Town ===
On 30 January 2026, Ranger joined Isthmian League Premier Division club Chatham Town. He departed the club at the end of the 2025–26 season.

=== AFC Whyteleafe ===
On 15 August 2026, Ranger signed for fellow Isthmian League side AFC Whyteleafe.

== International career ==
Ranger made his debut for the England U19 team on 25 March 2009 against the Czech Republic U19s. He got his first goal for the Under-19s in his second match, against Bosnia and Herzegovina, with a headed effort. He helped his team to the final of the UEFA U-19 Championship but his team eventually lost the final to host nation Ukraine 2–0 in Donetsk.

== Legal history ==
In 2007, at the age of 15, Ranger was sentenced to 11 weeks in a Young Offenders Institute after being convicted of participating in street robbery in Muswell Hill, London.

In May 2011 Ranger was questioned by Newcastle after posing with a replica gun in a photograph.

On 27 August 2011, he was arrested on suspicion of assaulting a man in Newcastle city centre, leaving the victim unconscious in the street. Ranger was subsequently dropped to Newcastle United's reserve team. He was found not guilty of the charge in October 2012.

In October 2011 he was charged with being drunk and disorderly in Newcastle's Cathedral Square. The charge came only days after Ranger had been reinstated to Newcastle United's first-team training after a three-month exile in the club's reserves.

In March 2012, he was fined by The FA for making homophobic comments on social networking website Twitter.

In the early hours of 23 September 2012, police were called to a house in Enfield, north London after reports of a disturbance. The front door of the property was badly damaged and Ranger was arrested at the scene and later charged with criminal damage. The charge against Ranger was dropped that November after the court accepted his explanation that he had damaged the door after fearing his girlfriend was being kidnapped.

On 25 January 2013, Ranger was arrested on suspicion of rape in a Newcastle hotel room. In connection with the same alleged offence, Ranger was charged with rape on 8 July 2013. On 4 March 2014, he was cleared of the charge at Newcastle Crown Court.

On 14 March 2013, Ranger was charged with common assault after an incident in Newcastle city centre.

On 23 March 2014, Ranger was arrested on suspicion of causing criminal damage to a taxi in Liverpool. He later pleaded guilty to criminal damage and was fined £1,000 and was ordered to pay compensation to the taxi driver for breaking a window. Ranger said that he was enraged by being called a rapist by the driver.

On 28 April 2014, Ranger was charged with criminal damage after an incident at a block of flats in Swindon on 13 April. He was later fined for damage to the door of his flat in relation to this incident which was captured on CCTV, in an incident where he additionally appeared to strike his female companion three times in the face.

In May 2014, Ranger was found not guilty of being drunk in charge of his vehicle, after being found asleep in the driver's seat of his car on the M4 motorway.

In December 2016, Ranger was charged with conspiracy to defraud and conspiracy to commit money laundering, in respect of offences alleged to have been committed in February 2015. In January 2017, he pleaded guilty to conspiracy to defraud at Wood Green Crown Court. On 23 May 2017, he was sentenced to eight months in prison. On 11 August 2017, he was released after 10 weeks of his sentence due to "his consistently excellent custodial behaviour", remaining under curfew for the next five weeks.

== Career statistics ==
As of end of 2024–25 season

Appearances and goals by club, season and competition
Club	Season	League			FA Cup		League Cup		Europe		Other		Total	
Club	Season	Division	Apps	Goals	Apps	Goals	Apps	Goals	Apps	Goals	Apps	Goals	Apps	Goals
Newcastle United	2009–10	Championship	25	2	3	0	2	0	—		—		30	2
Newcastle United	2010–11	Premier League	24	0	1	0	3	1	—		—		28	1
Newcastle United	2011–12	Premier League	0	0	0	0	0	0	—		—		0	0
Newcastle United	2012–13	Premier League	2	0	1	0	0	0	1 (Note: Appearance in Europa League)	0	—		4	0
Newcastle United	Total		51	2	5	0	5	1	1	0	—		62	3
Barnsley (loan)	2011–12	Championship	5	0	0	0	0	0	—		—		5	0
Sheffield Wednesday (loan)	2011–12	League One	8	2	0	0	0	0	—		—		8	2
Swindon Town	2013–14	League One	23	8	1	0	2	1	—		2 (Note: Appearances in Football League Trophy)	1	28	10
Blackpool	2014–15	Championship	14	2	0	0	0	0	—		—		14	2
Blackpool	2015–16	League One	0	0	0	0	0	0	—		—		0	0
Southend United	2016–17	League One	27	8	0	0	0	0	—		1 (Note: Appearance in EFL Trophy)	0	28	8
Southend United	2017–18	League One	18	2	1	0	0	0	—		2	0	21	2
Southend United	Total		45	10	1	0	0	0	—		3	0	49	10
Spalding United	2020–21	NPL Division One South East	1	1	0	0	0	0	—		—		1	1
Southend United	2020–21	League Two	1	0	0	0	0	0	—		—		1	0
Boreham Wood	2021–22	National League	0	0	4	0	0	0	—		—		4	0
Kettering Town	2024–25	SFL Premier Division Central	30	9	5	3	0	0	—		3 (Note: Two appearances and one goal in SFL Premier Division Central playoffs, one appearance in FA Trophy)	1	38	13
Career total			178	34	16	3	7	2	1	0	8	2	210	41

== Honours ==
Newcastle United

- Football League Championship: 2009–10

England U19

- UEFA European Under-19 Championship runner-up: 2009
