= Leigh Bedwell =

English footballer

Personal information
- Full name: Leigh Andrew Bedwell
- Date of birth: 8 January 1994 (age 32)
- Place of birth: Wantage, England
- Position: Goalkeeper

Team information
- Current team: Didcot Town

Youth career
- 2010–2012: Swindon Town

Senior career*
Years	Team	Apps	(Gls)
2012–2014	Swindon Town	1	(0)
2013	→ Banbury United (loan)	13	(0)
2014	→ Worcester City (loan)	4	(0)
2014–2015	Banbury United	42	(0)
2015–	Didcot Town	250	(?)
- * Club domestic league appearances and goals as of 19:00, 19 June 2015 (UTC)

Leigh Andrew Bedwell (born 8 January 1994) is an English professional footballer who played for Swindon Town between 2012 and 2014 as a goalkeeper. After leaving Swindon Town, Bedwell dropped into non-league football with Banbury United and Didcot Town, for whom he signed in June 2015.

== Career ==
Bedwell joined Swindon Town as a child, making his way through the youth ranks with the Wiltshire club. Bedwell was given a first team squad number at the age of seventeen – when still a part of the youth set-up – acting as back-up to deputy Phil Smith, when first-choice keeper Mattia Lanzano and third-choice Mark Scott were both injured at the start of the 2011–12 season. The arrival of Wes Foderingham prevented Bedwell from keeping his place in the starting sixteen but at the end of the season – though Smith, Lanzano and Scott were all released – Bedwell was offered his first professional contract, and he signed a one-year deal.

Ahead of the 2012–13 season, Bedwell was given number 30 shirt. On 2 September 2012 Bedwell made his first team debut for Swindon in the 4–1 loss at Preston North End. With Swindon losing 2–0 early into the game, Town manager Paolo Di Canio decided to substitute first-choice goalkeeper Wes Foderingham for the rookie Bedwell. At the end of the 2012–13 season, Bedwell's contract was extended for a further season.

Bedwell was loaned out to Banbury United in September 2013 to gain first-team experience. After making thirteen appearances, Bedwell returned on loan. In late April, Bedwell rejoined Worcester City on loan for the second time this season.

Bedwell was among ten players to be released by Swindon Town on 2 May 2014.

After his release by Swindon Town, Bedwell rejoined Banbury United on a permanent deal and was an ever-present in the side. However, following Banbury's relegation from the Southern Premier Division in 2015, he joined Southern League Division One South & West side Didcot Town in June 2015.

== Career statistics ==
As of 10 May 2013

Appearances and goals by club, season and competition
Club	Season	League		FA Cup		League Cup		FL Trophy		FL Play-Offs		Other		Total	
Club	Season	Apps	Goals	Apps	Goals	Apps	Goals	Apps	Goals	Apps	Goals	Apps	Goals	Apps	Goals
Swindon Town	2011–12	0	0	0	0	0	0	0	0	0	0	0	0	0	0
Swindon Town	2012–13	1	0	0	0	0	0	0	0	0	0	0	0	1	0
Swindon Town	2013–14	0	0	0	0	0	0	0	0	0	0	0	0	0	0
Swindon Town	Total	1	0	0	0	0	0	0	0	0	0	0	0	1	0
Career total		1	0	0	0	0	0	0	0	0	0	0	0	1	0
