= Connor Waldon =

English footballer (born 1995)

Personal information
- Full name: Connor Mark Waldon
- Date of birth: 13 February 1995 (age 31)
- Place of birth: Swindon, England
- Position: Centre forward

Team information
- Current team: Swindon Supermarine

Youth career
- 2005–2013: Swindon Town

Senior career*
Years	Team	Apps	(Gls)
2013–2015	Swindon Town	5	(0)
2013	→ Frome Town (loan)	6	(1)
2013	→ Gloucester City (loan)	10	(7)
2014	→ Tamworth (loan)	2	(0)
2014	→ Gloucester City (loan)	4	(1)
2014	→ Brackley Town (loan)	4	(0)
2015	→ Swindon Supermarine (loan)	13	(6)
2015–2016	Swindon Supermarine	29	(5)
2016	Mangotsfield United	5	(1)
2016–2017	Swindon Supermarine	39	(17)
2017–	North Leigh	0	(0)
- * Club domestic league appearances and goals as of 16:30, 2 August 2015 (UTC)

Connor Mark Waldon (born 13 February 1995) is an English footballer who plays for Swindon Supermarine. He made five league appearances professionally for Swindon Town.

== Career ==
=== Swindon Town ===
Waldon began his footballing career within Wiltshire junior football, where he was discovered by Swindon Town youth director Jeremy Newton.

With Swindon Town suffering an end-of-season injury crisis, Waldon was among the youth players selected for first team duty by Swindon Town manager Kevin MacDonald. Francis made his Swindon debut as a late second-half substitute against Stevenage on Saturday 21 April 2013.

On 15 January 2014, Connor joined Tamworth on loan.

== Career statistics ==
Appearances and goals by club, season and competition
Club	Season	League			FA Cup		League Cup		Other		Total	
Club	Season	Division	Apps	Goals	Apps	Goals	Apps	Goals	Apps	Goals	Apps	Goals
Swindon Town	2012–13	League One	1	0	0	0	0	0	0	0	1	0
Swindon Town	2013–14	League One	3	0	0	0	0	0	0	0	3	0
Swindon Town	2014–15	League One	1	0	0	0	1	0	2 (Note: Appearance(s) in Football League Trophy)	0	4	0
Swindon Town	Total		5	0	0	0	1	0	2	0	8	0
Tamworth (loan)	2013–14	Football Conference	2	0	0	0	—		0	0	2	0
Career total			44	14	0	0	1	0	2	0	0	0
