= Tijane Reis =

Guinea-Bissauan/Portuguese footballer

Tijane
Personal information
- Full name: Tijane Freitas Reis
- Date of birth: 28 June 1991 (age 35)
- Place of birth: Canchungo, Guinea-Bissau
- Height: 1.81 m (5 ft 11 in)
- Position: Left winger

Team information
- Current team: FSV Bernau

Youth career
- FC Canchungo
- Benfica

Senior career*
| Years | Team | Apps | (Gls) |
| 2010–2011 | Mirandela | 22 | (4) |
| 2011–2013 | Chaves | 32 | (2) |
| 2013–2014 | Swindon Town | 6 | (0) |
| 2015–2016 | Estoril | 3 | (0) |
| 2017–2018 | Merelinense | 20 | (2) |
| 2020– | FSV Bernau | 5 | (0) |

International career
| 2012 | Portugal U21 | 1 | (0) |
- * Club domestic league appearances and goals as of 20:09, 25 January 2021 (UTC)

Tijane Freitas Reis (born 28 June 1991), simply known as Tijane, is a Portuguese professional footballer who plays for German club FSV Bernau as a left winger.

== Club career ==
Tijane was born in Canchungo, Guinea-Bissau, but was raised in Conakry, due to war on his native country. He then had a brief period in S.L. Benfica's youth system, and later made his professional debuts with S.C. Mirandela. He also had a trial at Chelsea F.C., but nothing came of it. After a full season, he signed with G.D. Chaves.

Tijane made his Segunda Divisão debut on 6 November 2011, in a 3–1 home victory against Merelinense F.C. He scored his first goal on 29 April 2012, in a 4–3 home defeat against F.C. Vizela. In his second season, he contributed with 11 appearances and one goal, as Chaves was crowned champions. In August, he was linked to a host of clubs, the likes of Benfica, Stoke City F.C. and West Ham United F.C.

On 2 July 2013, Tijane signed a two-year deal with Swindon Town F.C. On 3 August, he made his professional debut, in a 1–0 away defeat against Peterborough United. On 10 September 2014, Mark Cooper announced Tijane had moved on from the club.

On 2 January 2015, Tijane signed a 2 1/2-year deal with G.D. Estoril Praia, returning to Portugal. He made his Primeira Liga debut on 22 February, coming on as a late substitute in a 2–1 home loss against Académica de Coimbra.

== International career ==
After impressing with Segunda Liga side Chaves, Tijane made his international debut with Portugal U21 on 6 June 2012, in a 3–1 win against Albania.
