= Mark Francis (English footballer) =

English footballer

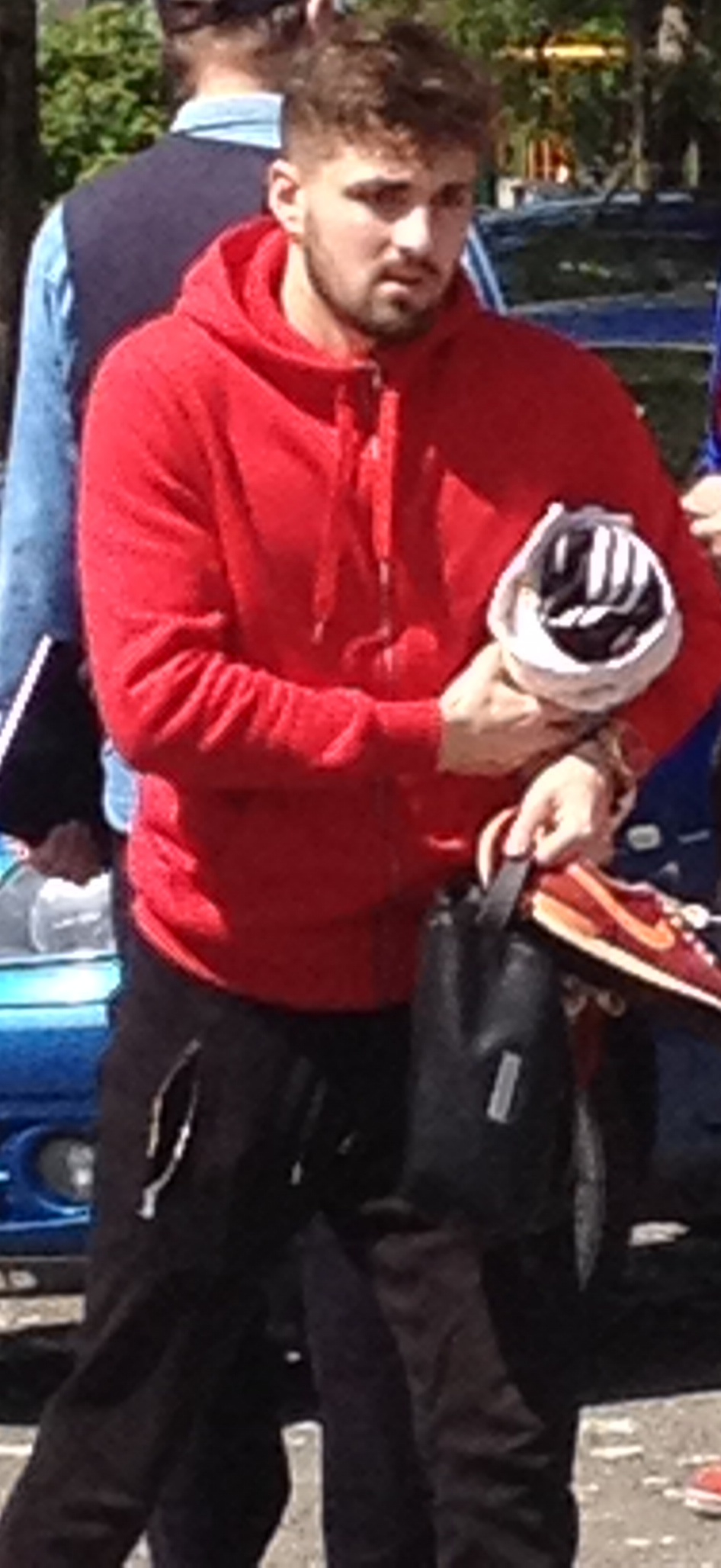

Personal information
- Full name: Mark James Francis
- Date of birth: 12 December 1994 (age 31)
- Place of birth: Dorchester, England
- Position: Winger

Team information
- Current team: Didcot Town

Youth career
- 2011–2013: Swindon Town

Senior career*
Years	Team	Apps	(Gls)
2013–2014	Swindon Town	2	(0)
2013	→ AFC Totton (loan)	1	(0)
2013	→ Frome Town (loan)	4	(2)
2014	Frome Town	13	(5)
2015	Chippenham Town	12	(0)
2015	Didcot Town		
2016–2017	Wantage Town		
2017	Salisbury	2	(1)
2017–2019	Evesham United		
2019–	Didcot Town	11	(4)
- * Club domestic league appearances and goals as of 20:27, 1 December 2019 (UTC)

Mark James Francis (born 12 December 1994) is an English footballer who plays as a winger for Didcot Town.

== Career ==
=== Swindon Town ===
Francis began his footballing career within Portsmouth's academy set-up.

At the age of 16 Francis was released by Portsmouth and joined the Swindon Town after writing to Under-18's coach Paul Bodin to request a trial.

With Swindon Town suffering an injury crisis, Mark Francis was among the youth players selected for first team duty by Swindon Town manager Kevin MacDonald. Francis made his Swindon debut as a second-half substitute.
