= Jack Barthram =

English footballer

Personal information
- Full name: Jack Patrick Barthram
- Date of birth: 13 October 1993 (age 33)
- Place of birth: Newham, England
- Position: Defender

Team information
- Current team: Haringey Borough
- Number: 12

Youth career
- Buckhurst Hill
- 2009–2011: Tottenham Hotspur

Senior career*
Years	Team	Apps	(Gls)
2011–2013	Tottenham Hotspur	0	(0)
2013–2015	Swindon Town	16	(0)
2015–2017	Cheltenham Town	71	(1)
2017–2019	Barrow	60	(1)
2019–2020	FC United of Manchester	1	(0)
2020–	Haringey Borough		
- * Club domestic league appearances and goals as of 01:36, 10 March 2020 (UTC)

Jack Patrick Barthram (born 13 October 1993) is an English footballer who most recently played for Isthmian League club Haringey Borough.

== Career ==
=== Swindon Town ===
Barthram began his career with Tottenham Hotspur, joining from non-league club Buckhurst Hill, and after progressing the club's youth system, he signed his first professional contract in July 2012. However, in June 2013, Barthram was released by the club.

Weeks after being released by Tottenham Hotspur, Barthram joined Swindon Town on 25 June 2013, signing a one-year contract, with an option to extend. Upon joining the club, he was given number twenty-three shirt ahead of the new season. He made his professional debut in a 1–0 victory against Torquay United on 6 August 2013 in the Football League Cup. He scored his first career goal in a Football League Trophy tie against Plymouth Argyle. Weeks later on 26 October 2013, he made his first start and played the whole game, in a 2–1 loss against Oldham Athletic. However, Barthram struggled to become the first team regular, due to competitions, despite impressive as a substitute and finished his first season, making fifteen appearances and scoring once in all competitions. Although he proved himself despite losing 2–1 to Rotherham United on the final game of the season, he signed a one-year contract extension with the club.

In the 2014–15 season, Barthram struggled with an abductor tear in the pre-season tour, which he missed out two friendly matches in late-July. Despite this, he made his first appearance of the season, playing as a left-back and played 68 minutes before substituted, in a 1–0 loss against Crawley Town on 16 August 2014. However, once again, Barthram continued to struggled to find his first team football opportunities and was demoted to the club's reserve squad. After training with League Two side Exeter City in hopes of joining them on loan, this never happened and stayed at the club for the rest of the season. As the 2014–15 season was coming to a close, Bartham had a first team chance: appearing two starts against Preston North End At the end of the 2014–15 season, making nine appearances in all competitions, Barthram was released by the club upon expiry of his contract.

=== Cheltenham Town ===
Several weeks after being released by Swindon Town, Barthram signed for Cheltenham Town on 23 June 2015. Upon joining the club, Barthram said his aim was to help the club win the league after the club was relegated from League Two. Upon joining the club, he was given number two shirt.

Barthram made his Cheltenham Town debut, starting as a right-back and playing the whole the game, in a 1–1 draw against Lincoln City in the opening game of the season. Weeks later on 23 August 2015, in a 2–1 win over Barrow, he set up a goal for Kyle Storer to score an equaliser. Since making Cheltenham Town, Barthram became a first team regular, becoming a first choice as a right-back and helped the side reach back to League Two. At the end of the 2015–16 season, Barthram signed a contract extension.

In the 2016–17 season, Barthram started the season when he faced competitions and was placed on the substitute bench. Barthram scored his first goal for Cheltenham in an FA Cup tie against Crewe Alexandra on 15 November 2016, which saw them go through after beating 4–1. His second goal of the season came on 31 January 2017, in a 3–2 win over Luton Town. However, as the 2016–17 season progressed, Barthram struggled to regain his first team opportunities in his second season at Cheltenham Town, as well as his own injury concern. Nevertheless, he went on to make twenty-four appearances and scoring twice in all competitions. However, Bartham was released by the club.

=== Barrow ===
On 1 August 2017, Barthram signed for National League club Barrow on a one-year contract. He opened his scoring account for the club against Boreham Wood F.C. He was released on 6 May 2019.

=== FC United and Haringey ===
On 15 October 2019 it was confirmed, that Barthram had joined F.C. United of Manchester. He left the club in January 2020 to join Haringey Borough.

== Career statistics ==
=== Club ===
As of 29 June 2017

Appearances and goals by club, season and competition
Club	Season	League		FA Cup		League Cup		FL Trophy		Other		Total	
Club	Season	Apps	Goals	Apps	Goals	Apps	Goals	Apps	Goals	Apps	Goals	Apps	Goals
Swindon Town	2013–14	11	0	1	0	1	0	2	1	0	0	15	1
Swindon Town	2014–15	5	0	0	0	1	0	2	0	0	0	8	0
Swindon Town	Total	16	0	1	0	2	0	4	1	0	0	23	1
Cheltenham Town	2015–16	42	0	3	0	—		—		2	0	47	0
Cheltenham Town	2016–17	29	1	2	1	1	0	4	0	0	0	36	2
Cheltenham Town	Total	71	1	5	1	1	0	4	0	2	0	83	2
Career total		87	1	6	1	3	0	8	1	2	0	106	3

== Honours ==
=== Cheltenham Town ===
Vanarama National League Winners: 2015-16
