= 2012–13 Swindon Town F.C. season =

Swindon Town
2012–13 season
- Chairman: Jeremy Wray (until October 2012); Sir William Patey (until February 2013); Jed McCrory
- Manager: Paolo Di Canio (until 18 February 2013); Fabrizio Piccareta (until 20 February 2013); Tommy Miller & Darren Ward (until 28 February 2013); Kevin MacDonald
- Ground: County Ground, Swindon
- League One: 6th
- FA Cup: First round (Knocked out by Macclesfield Town)
- League Cup: Fourth round (Knocked out by Aston Villa)
- Football League Trophy: First round (Knocked out by Oxford United)
- Top goalscorer: League: James Collins (15); All: James Collins (18)
- Highest home attendance: 14,434 vs. Aston Villa – (League Cup)
- Lowest home attendance: 5,737 vs. Brighton & Hove Albion – (League Cup)
Home colours	Away colours	Third colours

The 2012–13 season was Swindon Town's first season in the League One since 2010–11. Swindon will seek to achieve back-to-back promotions after winning promotion from League Two. The club will also compete in the FA Cup, League Cup and the Football League Trophy.

== Chronological list of events ==
- 6 October 2012: The club are placed under a Football League transfer embargo for breaking limits on wages and transfer fees.
- 15 October 2012: Jeremy Wray is replaced by former British diplomat Sir William Patey as chairman.
- 6 November 2012: The transfer embargo is lifted by the Football League.
- 3 January 2013: Sir William Patey tells the BBC that no money will be available for transfers.
- 5 January 2013: Paolo Di Canio offers to spend between £20,000-£30,000 of his own money to keep his loan players at the club.
- 12 January 2013: Swindon Town officially back the Football Supporters' Federation's 'Safe Standing' campaign after a poll conducted by fan website, 'The Washbag', shows overwhelming support in favour of the return of stadia terracing.
- 13 January 2013: On-loan midfielder John Bostock returns to Tottenham Hotspur.
- 16 January 2013: Majority shareholder Andrew Black confirms that he is actively trying to sell the club.
- 20 January 2013: Paolo Di Canio, club staff and supporters successfully rally together to clear snow from the County Ground pitch ahead of the League One fixture with Shrewsbury Town.
- 22 January 2013: Swindon Town accept an apology from The League Paper after staff writer, Chris Dunlavy, suggested the club committed "financial doping" and "virtually cheated" their way to the League Two title during the 2011/12 season.
- 25 January 2013: Chairman Sir William Patey announces that he will quit once the takeover of the club is completed.
- 30 January 2013: The club announce that an agreement had been made to sell the Swindon Town to a consortium fronted by businessman Jed McCrory. The takeover is subject to Football League approval.
- 30 January 2013: Matt Ritchie joins Bournemouth for £500,000. Swindon Town state that the transfer was a necessity as the club try to avoid administration.
- 31 January 2013: The loan-to-permanent transfer of Cheltenham Town midfielder Marlon Pack along with loan deals for Charlton Athletic duo Bradley Wright-Phillips and Danny Green are blocked by the Football League, who refuse to ratify the deals before the takeover of the club is approved.
- 1 February 2013: Paolo Di Canio releases a statement announcing that he is considering his future with the club.
- 1 February 2013: The Board release a statement to assure supporters that work is continuing to secure the sale of the club and responds to Paolo Di Canio's statement by reiterating the Italian manager still has the support of the club.
- 18 February 2013: Paolo Di Canio resigns.
- 19 February 2013: Fabrizio Piccareta is caretaker manager for the 3–1 victory at Tranmere Rovers. However, Di Canio's former assistant resigns shortly afterwards.
- 20 February 2013: Senior players Tommy Miller & Darren Ward are appointed co-caretaker managers.
- 21 February 2013: Jed McCrory's consortium take full control of the club.
- 21 February 2013: Swindon Town legend Fraser Digby is appointed interim goalkeeper coach as a temporary replacement for Domenico Doardo who resigned days before.
- 21 February 2013: It was reported that on the night of 20 February, Paolo Di Canio had carried out a raid on his old Swindon Town office and had torn down pictures of his time as manager.
- 21/22 February 2013: Majority shareholder Andrew Black uses social network website Twitter to explain his decision to sell the club.
- 22 February 2013: Exiled midfielder Luke Rooney returns to the first team set-up.
- 22 February 2013: Michael Peacock is appointed interim fitness & conditioning coach.
- 28 February 2013: Kevin MacDonald is appointed manager.
- 6 March 2013: Chief Executive Nick Watkins leaves the club.
- 28 March 2013: The Football League lift transfer embargo.

== League data ==
Pos	Team	Pld	W	D	L	GF	GA	GD	Pts	Promotion, qualification or relegation
4	Yeovil Town (O, P)	46	23	8	15	71	56	+15	77	Qualification for League One play-offs (Note: Four teams play for one spot and promotion to Football League Championship.)
5	Sheffield United	46	19	18	9	56	42	+14	75	Qualification for League One play-offs
6	Swindon Town	46	20	14	12	72	39	+33	74	Qualification for League One play-offs
7	Leyton Orient	46	21	8	17	55	48	+7	71	
8	Milton Keynes Dons	46	19	13	14	62	45	+17	70	

Updated to match(es) played on 27 April 2013. Source: BBC Sport
Rules for classification: 1) Points; 2) Goal difference; 3) Number of goals scored
(O) Play-off winners; (P) Promoted
Notes:

Round	1	2	3	4	5	6	7	8	9	10	11	12	13	14	15	16	17	18	19	20	21	22	23	24	25	26	27	28	29	30	31	32	33	34	35	36	37	38	39	40	41	42	43	44	45	46
Ground	A	H	H	A	H	A	A	H	A	H	A	H	H	A	A	H	A	H	H	A	H	A	H	H	H	A	H	A	A	A	H	A	H	H	A	H	A	A	H	H	A	A	A	H	H	A
Result	D	W	W	L	L	D	W	W	W	L	W	D	D	L	W	D	W	W	L	L	D	W	W	W	W	D	W	D	D	W	D	W	D	L	W	D	L	W	D	D	L	L	L	W	W	L
Position	18	4	3	8	10	10	8	5	4	8	4	6	6	7	7	7	6	3	6	8	8	7	5	5	5	5	3	3	4	3	3	1	2	4	3	3	4	3	2	4	5	6	6	6	5	6

Updated to match(es) played on 28 March 2013. Source: swindontownfc.co.uk
A = Away; H = Home; W = Win; D = Draw; L = Loss

== Sponsors ==
Adidas

Samsung

Supplier: Adidas
Sponsor(s): Samsung (Home), EA Sports (Away), The People (F.A. Cup)

== Pre-season ==
During the final stages of the 2011/12 season Swindon Town confirmed two pre-season friendlies, the first confirmed fixture was a home tie against Championship side Crystal Palace (8 August). Shortly afterwards the club announced that a local friendly with fellow Wiltshire outfit Salisbury City was confirmed to take place at the Raymond McEnhill Stadium on 3 August.

In June 2012, it was announced that the club would be spending two weeks of pre-season training in Italy between Sunday 1st – Saturday 14 July. The team based themselves close to Bardolino near Lake Garda. It was later confirmed that Swindon would play a local Select XI consisting on Serie D standard players and Bayern Munich II. An away fixture against Non-League side Weston-super-Mare was later confirmed.

=== Results ===
5 July 2012 Italy Training Camp	Verona Select XI	1–9	Swindon Town	Veronella
17:00	Piasentin 49' (pen.)	Report	Collins 6' 8'; Williams 32'; Rooney 57' 81' (pen.) 84'; De Vita 66'; Benson 74'; Storey 86'

11 July 2012 Italy Training Camp	Bayern Munich II	1–1	Swindon Town	Andalo
17:30	Schöpf 25'	Report	Benson 3'	Attendance: 600

18 July 2012 Friendly	Weston-super-Mare	1–6	Swindon Town	Woodspring Stadium
19:30	Grubb 47'	Report	Ritchie 6', 43'; Williams 11'; Collins 32'; De Vita 60'; Benson 86'	Attendance: 800; Referee: Kevin Johnson

24 July 2012 Friendly	Forest Green Rovers	0–4	Swindon Town	The New Lawn
19:45			Archibald-Henville 17'; Caddis 22' (pen.); Roberts 67'; Ferry 81'	Attendance: 1,517 (731 Swindon Town fans); Referee: Brendan Malone

30 July 2012 Friendly	Swindon Supermarine	0–1	Swindon Town	Hunts Copse Ground
19:00		Report	Miller 15'

3 August 2012 Friendly	Salisbury City	0–3	Swindon Town	Raymond McEnhill Stadium
19:45			Roberts 12'; Archibald-Henville 27'; Benson 89'

8 August 2012 Friendly	Swindon Town	0–1	Crystal Palace	County Ground
19:45			Easter 10' (pen.)	Attendance: 4,312

== League One ==
The fixture list for the 2012/13 season was announced on 18 June 2012. It was confirmed that Swindon would begin their campaign with an away fixture at Hartlepool United.

=== August ===
18 August 2012 1 L1	Hartlepool United	0–0	Swindon Town	Victoria Park
15:00				Attendance: 4,132; Referee: M. Brown

21 August 2012 2 L1	Swindon Town	3–0	Crawley Town	County Ground
19:45	Ritchie 25'; Miller 44'; De Vita 63'			Attendance: 7,658; Referee: K. Stroud

25 August 2012 3 L1	Swindon Town	1–0	Milton Keynes Dons	County Ground
15:00	Ritchie 45'			Attendance: 8,299; Referee: D. Phillips

=== September ===
2 September 2012 L1	Preston North End	4–1	Swindon Town	Deepdale
16:00	Sodje 5'; Wroe 10'; Beavon 43'; Welsh 68'		De Vita 58'	Attendance: 10,372; Referee: R. Madley

8 September 2012 L1	Swindon Town	0–1	Leyton Orient	County Ground
15:00			Cook 59'	Attendance: 8,072; Referee: D. Mohareb

15 September 2012 L1	Carlisle United	2–2	Swindon Town	Brunton Park
15:00	Jervis 14', 30'		A. Rooney 29'; Benson 32'	Attendance: 4,987; Referee: D. Drysdale

18 September 2012 L1	Portsmouth	1–2	Swindon Town	Fratton Park
19:45	Michalik 90'		Ritchie 45'; Williams 55'	Attendance: 12,121; Referee: S. Rushton

22 September 2012 L1	Swindon Town	4–0	Bournemouth	County Ground
15:00	Ritchie 12', 67'; Williams 25'; A. Rooney 85'			Attendance: 8,533; Referee: A. Woolmer

29 September 2012 L1	Shrewsbury Town	0–1	Swindon Town	New Meadow
15:00			Ferry 77'	Attendance: 6,303; Referee: D. Webb

=== October ===
2 October 2012 L1	Swindon Town	0–1	Colchester United	County Ground
19:45			Rose 70'	Attendance: 7,443; Referee: I. Williamson

6 October 2012 L1	Bury	0–1	Swindon Town	Gigg Lane
15:00			Collins 1'	Attendance: 2,683; Referee: A. Haines

13 October 2012 L1	Swindon Town	2–2	Coventry City	County Ground
15:00	Roberts 77'; Collins 80'		McGoldrick 13', 37'	Attendance: 9,808

20 October 2012 L1	Swindon Town	1–1	Scunthorpe United	County Ground
15:00	Collins 18'		Hawley 56'	Attendance: 7,388; Referee: P. Miller

23 October 2012 L1	Crewe Alexandra	2–1	Swindon Town	Alexandra Stadium
19:45	Moore 29', 41'		De Vita 25'	Attendance: 4,010; Referee: C. Pawson

27 October 2012 L1	Stevenage	0–4	Swindon Town	Lamex Stadium
15:00			De Vita 17'; Ritchie 31'; Storey 38'; A. Rooney 62'	Attendance: 4,518; Referee: D. Deadman

=== November ===
6 November 2012 L1	Swindon Town	0–0	Sheffield United	County Ground
19:45				Attendance: 8,354; Referee: O. Langford

10 November 2012 L1	Walsall	0–2	Swindon Town	Banks's Stadium
15:00			Ferry 1'; Ritchie 62'	Attendance: 4,139; Referee: R. Lewis

17 November 2012 L1	Swindon Town	4–1	Yeovil Town	County Ground
15:00	Williams 24'; Collins 28' 90'; Ward 43'		Hayter 41'	Attendance: 8,112; Referee: M. Heywood

20 November 2012 L1	Swindon Town	0–1	Brentford	County Ground
19:45			Donaldson 59'	Attendance: 7,431; Referee: D. Whitestone

24 November 2012 L1	Notts County	1–0	Swindon Town	Meadow Lane
15:00	Judge 28'			Attendance: 6,383; Referee: R. Madley

=== December ===
8 December 2012 L1	Swindon Town	1–1	Doncaster Rovers	County Ground
15:00	Ritchie 8'		Hollands 10' (o.g.)	Attendance: 7,770; Referee: D. Phillips

15 December 2012 L1	Oldham Athletic	0–2	Swindon Town	Boundary Park
15:00			De Vita 28' 31'	Attendance: 3,345; Referee: C. Boyeson

21 December 2012 L1	Swindon Town	5–0	Tranmere Rovers	County Ground
19:45	Hollands 4'; De Vita 7'; Williams 21' 51'; Ritchie 33'			Attendance: 7,770; Referee: D. Phillips

=== January ===
1 January 2013 L1	Swindon Town	5–0	Portsmouth	County Ground
15:00	Collins 61' 66' 73' 83'; Hollands 69'			Attendance: 11,504; Referee: S. Martin

5 January 2013 L1	Swindon Town	4–0	Carlisle United	County Ground
15:00	Williams 16' 55'; Collins 36'; De Vita 80'			Attendance: 9,162; Referee: T. Kettle

12 January 2013 L1	Bournemouth	1–1	Swindon Town	Dean Court
15:00	Arter 26'		Williams 85'	Attendance: 8,777; Referee: P. Gibbs

19 January 2013 L1	Swindon Town	2–0	Shrewsbury Town	County Ground
15:00	Martin 49' (pen.); Williams 53'			Attendance: 7,754; Referee: R. Clark

30 January 2013 L1	Leyton Orient	0–0	Swindon Town	Brisbane Road
19:45				Attendance: 3,546; Referee: A. D'Urso

=== February ===
2 February 2013 L1	Crawley Town	1–1	Swindon Town	Broadfield Stadium
17:20	Clarke 23' (pen.)		Rooney 59' (pen.)	Attendance: 3,558; Referee: A. Madley

5 February 2013 L1	Colchester United	0–1	Swindon Town	Weston Homes Community Stadium
19:45			Collins 53'	Attendance: 3,214; Referee: T. Robinson

9 February 2013 L1	Swindon Town	1–1	Hartlepool United	County Ground
15:00	Ferry 15'		Monkhouse 74'	Attendance: 9,973; Referee: G. Ward

19 February 2013 L1	Tranmere Rovers	1–3	Swindon Town	Prenton Park
19:45	Daniels 78'		Collins 48'; Roberts 71' 90'	Attendance: 5223; Referee: C. Sarginson

23 February 2013 L1	Swindon Town	1–1	Preston North End	County Ground
15:00	A. Rooney 75'		Hayhurst 51'	Attendance: 9,145; Referee: D. Deadman

26 February 2013 L1	Swindon Town	0–1	Bury	County Ground
15:00	Schumacher 21'		51'	Attendance: 7,508; Referee: J. Adcock

=== March ===
2 March 2013 L1	Coventry City	1–2	Swindon Town	Ricoh Arena
1500	Moussa 2'		Williams 86'; Ward 90'	Attendance: 14,280; Referee: M. Heywood

9 March 2013 L1	Swindon Town	2–2	Walsall	County Ground
15:00	Williams 11'; Thompson (yellow card) 20'; Ferry (yellow card) 29' (goal) 79'; Roberts (yellow card) 43'	Summary	Grigg 32' (pen.); Taylor (yellow card) 45+2'; Butler (yellow card) 68'; Paterson 90'	Attendance: 8,407; Referee: D.Drysdale

12 March 2013 L1	Brentford	2–1	Swindon Town	Griffin Park
19:45	Moore (yellow card) 41'; Logan (yellow card) 54'; Saunders 73' (pen.); Donaldson 76'; Wright-Phillips (yellow card) 90+2'	Summary	Ferry 32'; Foderingham (yellow card) 71'; Thompson (yellow card) 86'	Attendance: 5,867; Referee: S.Attwell

19 March 2013 L1	Yeovil Town	0–2	Swindon Town	Huish Park
19:45			A. Rooney 77' (pen.); Collins 90'	Attendance: 5,207; Referee: K. Stroud

23 March 2013 L1	Swindon Town	0–0	Notts County	County Ground
15:00				Attendance: 8,415; Referee: C. Berry

29 March 2013 L1	Swindon Town	1–1	Oldham Athletic	County Ground
15:00	A. Rooney 71'		Barnard 68'	Attendance: 10,040; Referee: A. Madley

=== April ===
1 April 2013 L1	Doncaster Rovers	1–0	Swindon Town	Keepmoat Stadium
12:15	McCombe 80'			Attendance: 8,106; Referee: P. Tierney

9 April 2013 L1	Milton Keynes Dons	2–0	Swindon Town	Stadium mk
19:45	Doumbe 58'; Lowe 89'			Attendance: 8,608; Referee: M. Haywood

13 April 2013 L1	Sheffield United	2–0	Swindon Town	Bramall Lane
15:00	Porter 37'; Kitson 58'			Attendance: 19,298; Referee: E. Ilderton

16 April 2013 L1	Swindon Town	4–1	Crewe Alexandra	County Ground
19:45	A. Rooney 5' 25'; Luongo 18'; Collins 71'		Davis 65' (pen.)	Attendance: 7,169; Referee: A. Davies

20 April 2013 L1	Swindon Town	3–0	Stevenage	County Ground
15:00	Flint 22' 73'; Roberts 53'			Attendance: 9,515; Referee: G. Sutton

27 April 2013 L1	Scunthorpe United	3–1	Swindon Town	Glanford Park
15:00	Collins 87'; Duffy 90' (pen.); Hawley 90'		Collins 83'	Attendance: 6,020; Referee: K. Woolmer

=== May ===
4 May 2013 L1 Play-Offs (1st Leg)	Swindon Town	1–1	Brentford	County Ground
17:20	Luongo 70'		O'Connor 90' (pen.)	Attendance: 10,595; Referee: G. Eltringham

6 May 2013 L1 Play-Offs (2nd Leg)	Brentford	3–3 (5–4 p)	Swindon Town	Griffin Park
16:30	A. Rooney 24' (o.g.); Donaldson 40' 47'		A. Rooney 44'; Devera 57'; Flint 90'	Attendance: 9,109; Referee: N. Miller
	Penalties
	Saunders (penalty scored); Hayes (penalty scored); Dean (penalty scored); Craig (penalty scored); Forshaw (penalty scored)		(penalty scored) Devera; (penalty scored) Flint; (penalty scored) Collins; (penalty missed) Storey; (penalty scored) Roberts

== League Cup ==
=== Results ===
14 August 2012 R1	Swindon Town	3–0	Brighton & Hove Albion	County Ground
19:45	Benson 53'; Navarro 65', 75'			Attendance: 5,737; Referee: A. D'Urso

29 August 2012 R2	Stoke City	3–4 (a.e.t.)	Swindon Town	Britannia Stadium
19:45	Jones 63'; Walters 86'; Crouch 111'		Collins 27', 41', 119'; Flint 105'	Attendance: 9,147; Referee: N. Miller

25 September 2012 R3	Swindon Town	3–1	Burnley	County Ground
19:45	Benson 19'; Williams 42'; Archibald-Henville 83'		Austin 74'	Attendance: 7,353; Referee: J. Adcock

30 October 2012 R4	Swindon Town	2–3	Aston Villa	County Ground
19:45	Storey 78', 81'		Benteke 30', 90'; Agbonlahor 39'	Attendance: 14,434; Referee: S. Attwell

== Football League Trophy ==
=== Results ===
5 September 2012 1	Oxford United	1–0	Swindon Town	Kassam Stadium
19:45	Potter 88'			Attendance: 7,746; Referee: S. Matthieson

== F.A. Cup ==
=== Results ===
3 November 2012 R1	Swindon Town	0–2	Macclesfield Town	County Ground
15:00			Diagne 63'; L. Thompson 90' (o.g.)	Attendance: 6,408; Referee: A. Davies

== Club information ==
=== Andrew Black Era (up until 21 February 2013) ===
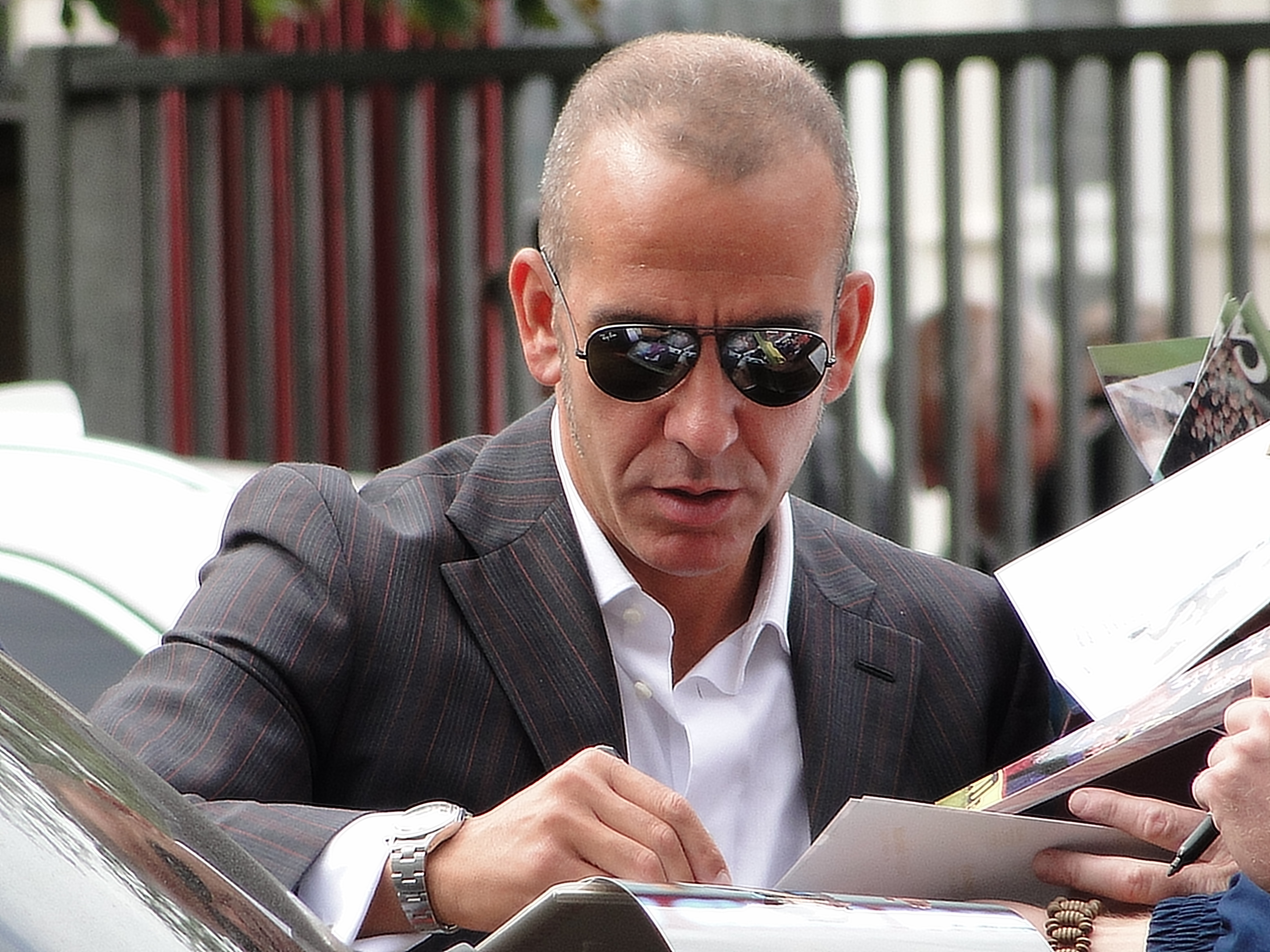
In June 2012 Paolo Di Canio signed a new deal scheduled to keep him at Swindon until 2015 but resigned in 2013.

Position	Name
Chairman	(England) Jeremy Wray (Until 15 October) (Scotland) Sir William Patey (Until 21 February)
Directors	(England) Sir William Patey, Russell Backhouse, Andrew Black, Nick Watkins
Chief Executive	(England) Nick Watkins
Manager	(Italy) Paolo Di Canio
Assistant manager	(Italy) Fabrizio Piccareta
Goalkeeper coach	(Italy) Domenico Doardo
Fitness coach	(Italy) Claudio Donatelli
Youth Team Manager	(Wales) Paul Bodin
Centre of Excellence	(England) Jeremy Newton
Physio	(England) Paul Godfrey

=== Jed McCrory Era (from 21 February 2013) ===
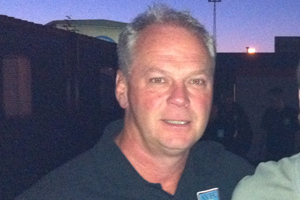
Former Aston Villa coach Kevin MacDonald was appointed manager on 28 February 2013.

Position	Name
Chairman	(England) Jed McCrory
Directors	(England) Jed McCrory (Republic of Ireland) Lee Power
General Manager	(England) Steve Murrall
Manager	(Scotland) Kevin MacDonald
Assistant manager	(England) Mark Cooper
Goalkeeper coach	(England) Fraser Digby (interim)
Fitness & Conditioning coach	(England) Michael Peacock (interim)
Youth Team Manager	(Wales) Paul Bodin
Centre of Excellence	(England) Jeremy Newton
Physio	(England) Paul Godfrey

=== Manager Season Stats ===
As of 1 May 2013. Only competitive matches for the 2012/13 season are counted

Name	Nat	From	To	Record					
Name	Nat	From	To	P	W	D	L	F	A
Paolo Di Canio	(Italy)	Season Start	18 February 2013	37	18	10	9	63	31
Fabrizio Piccareta (caretaker)	(Italy)	18 February 2013	20 February 2013	1	1	0	0	3	1
Tommy Miller & Darren Ward (joint-caretakers)	(England)	20 February 2013	28 February 2013	2	0	1	1	1	2
Kevin MacDonald	(Scotland)	28 February 2013	Season End	14	4	5	5	20	19

== Squad Details ==
=== Appearances and goals ===
As of 1 May 2013

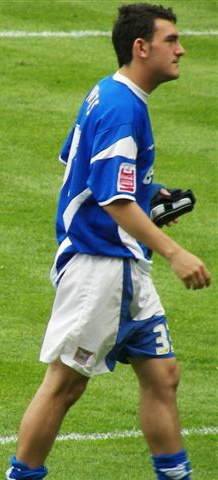
Gary Roberts joined the club after being released by Huddersfield Town.

No.	Pos	Nat	Player	Total		League One		FA Cup		League Cup		JP Trophy	
No.	Pos	Nat	Player	Apps	Goals	Apps	Goals	Apps	Goals	Apps	Goals	Apps	Goals
1	GK	(England) ENG	Wes Foderingham	52	0	46	0	1	0	4	0	1	0
2	DF	(England) ENG	Troy Archibald-Henville	8	1	3+2	0	1	0	2	1	0	0
3	DF	(Scotland) SCO	Jay McEveley	33	0	27+1	0	1	0	4	0	0	0
4	DF	(England) ENG	Aden Flint	34	3	28+1	2	1+0	0	2+1	1	0+1	0
5	DF	(England) ENG	Joe Devera	29	0	23+2	0	0	0	3	0	1	0
6	MF	(England) ENG	Alan Navarro	20	2	12+5	0	0	0	3	2	0	0
7	MF	(England) ENG	Luke Rooney	12	0	1+10	0	0	0	0+1	0	0	0
8	MF	(Scotland) SCO	Simon Ferry	48	3	32+10	3	1	0	1+3	0	1	0
9	FW	(Republic of Ireland) IRL	James Collins	49	18	27+18	15	0+1	0	2+1	3	0	0
11	MF	(England) ENG	Gary Roberts	42	4	29+10	4	1	0	2	0	0	0
12	MF	(Republic of Ireland) IRL	Alan McCormack	45	0	38+2	0	0	0	4	0	1	0
15	DF	(England) ENG	Nathan Thompson	30	0	24+3	0	1	0	1+1	0	0	0
16	MF	(England) ENG	Andy Williams	46	12	38+2	11	1	0	3+1	1	1	0
18	MF	(England) ENG	Tommy Miller	39	1	28+6	1	0	0	4	0	0+1	0
19	MF	(England) ENG	Louis Thompson	5	0	1+2	0	0+1	0	0+1	0	0	0
20	FW	(England) ENG	Miles Storey	10	3	2+6	1	0	0	0+2	2	0	0
22	MF	(England) ENG	Darren Ward	41	2	39+0	2	1+0	0	0	0	1+0	0
23	FW	(Italy) ITA	Raffaele De Vita	40	8	24+12	8	1	0	2	0	1	0
24	DF	(England) ENG	Nathan Byrne (on loan from Tottenham Hotspur)	7	0	6+1	0	0	0	0	0	0	0
25	MF	(Australia) AUS	Massimo Luongo (on loan from Tottenham Hotspur)	7	1	7	1	0	0	0	0	0	0
28	FW	(Republic of Ireland) IRL	Adam Rooney (on loan from Birmingham City)	30	9	11+18	9	0	0	0	0	1+0	0
30	GK	(England) ENG	Leigh Bedwell	1	0	0+1	0	0	0	0	0	0	0
32	DF	(England) ENG	Chris Smith	0	0	0	0	0	0	0	0	0	0
33	MF	(England) ENG	Alex Ferguson	0	0	0	0	0	0	0	0	0	0
34	FW	(England) ENG	Connor Waldon	1	0	0+1	0	0	0	0	0	0	0
35	MF	(England) ENG	Aaron Ferris	0	0	0	0	0	0	0	0	0	0
36	MF	(England) ENG	Jake Simpson	0	0	0	0	0	0	0	0	0	0
37	FW	(England) ENG	Mark Francis	2	0	0+2	0	0	0	0	0	0	0
38	DF	(England) ENG	Matt Jones	0	0	0	0	0	0	0	0	0	0
--	MF	(England) ENG	Lee Cox	0	0	0	0	0	0	0	0	0	0
Players who are contracted to Swindon Town but are currently out on loan:
14	FW	(England) ENG	Paul Benson (on loan to Cheltenham Town)	13	3	6+3	1	0	0	3	2	1	0
Players who were contracted to Swindon Town but have since departed on a permanent basis:
10	MF	(Scotland) SCO	Matt Ritchie	31	9	26+1	9	0+1	0	3	0	0	0
13	MF	(Namibia) NAM	Oliver Risser	0	0	0	0	0	0	0	0	0	0
21	DF	(Argentina) ARG	Fede Bessone	6	0	4+1	0	0	0	0	0	1	0
24	FW	(England) ENG	Chris Martin (on loan from Norwich City)	12	1	6+6	1	0	0	0	0	0	0
25	MF	(England) ENG	Giles Coke (on loan from Sheffield Wednesday)	5	0	1+3	0	0	0	0	0	1+0	0
26	MF	(England) ENG	Danny Hollands (on loan from Charlton Athletic)	10	2	8+2	2	0	0	0	0	0+0	0
26	MF	(England) ENG	Dean Parrett (on loan from Tottenham Hotspur)	3	0	3	0	0	0	0	0	0	0
33	MF	(England) ENG	John Bostock (on loan from Tottenham Hotspur)	9	0	6+2	0	0+0	0	0+0	0	0+1	0

=== Captains ===
Accounts for all competitions. Last updated on 1 May 2013.

No.	Pos.	Nat.	Name	Games
12	MF	(Republic of Ireland)	Alan McCormack	42
8	DF	(Scotland)	Simon Ferry	5
18	MF	(England)	Tommy Miller	4
5	DF	(England)	Joe Devera	1

=== Goalscorers ===
Accounts for all competitions. Last updated on 1 May 2013.

Name	League	FA Cup	League Cup	JP Trophy	Total
James Collins	15	0	3	0	18
Andy Williams	11	0	1	0	12
Matt Ritchie	9	0	0	0	9
Adam Rooney	9	0	0	0	9
Raffaele De Vita	8	0	0	0	8
Simon Ferry	5	0	0	0	5
Paul Benson	1	0	2	0	3
Gary Roberts	4	0	0	0	4
Miles Storey	1	0	2	0	3
Danny Hollands	2	0	0	0	2
Alan Navarro	0	0	2	0	2
Troy Archibald-Henville	0	0	1	0	1
Aden Flint	2	0	1	0	3
Darren Ward	2	0	0	0	2
Massimo Luongo	1	0	0	0	1
Chris Martin	1	0	0	0	1
Tommy Miller	1	0	0	0	1
Own Goals	0	0	0	0	0
Total	72	0	12	0	84

=== Clean sheets ===
Includes all competitive matches.

R	No.	Pos	Nat	Name	League One	FA Cup	League Cup	JP Trophy	Total
1	1	GK	(England)	Wes Foderingham	19	0	1	0	20
				TOTALS	19	0	1	0	20

Last updated: 28 March 2013
Source: Match reports in Competitive matches

=== Disciplinary ===
Name	League Two		FA Cup		League Cup		JP Trophy		Total	
Name	Yellow card	Red card	Yellow card	Red card	Yellow card	Red card	Yellow card	Red card	Yellow card	Red card
Troy Archibald-Henville	1	0	0	0	1	0	0	0	2	0
Paul Benson	1	0	0	0	0	0	0	0	1	0
Federico Bessone	1	0	0	0	0	0	0	0	1	0
John Bostock	1	0	0	0	0	0	0	0	1	0
Nathan Byrne	1	0	0	0	0	0	0	0	1	0
James Collins	5	0	0	0	0	0	0	0	5	0
Joe Devera	2	0	0	0	0	0	0	0	2	0
Simon Ferry	3	0	0	0	0	0	0	0	3	0
Aden Flint	7	2	0	1	1	0	0	0	8	2
Wes Foderingham	3	0	0	0	0	0	0	0	3	0
Danny Hollands	2	0	0	0	0	0	0	0	2	0
Chris Martin	3	0	0	0	0	0	0	0	3	0
Alan McCormack	7	0	0	0	2	0	0	0	9	0
Jay McEveley	4	0	1	0	1	0	0	0	6	0
Tommy Miller	2	0	0	0	1	0	0	0	3	0
Alan Navarro	1	0	0	0	1	0	0	0	2	0
Matt Ritchie	4	0	0	0	0	0	0	0	4	0
Gary Roberts	5	0	1	0	0	0	0	0	6	0
Luke Rooney	1	0	0	0	0	0	0	0	1	0
Nathan Thompson	9	0	0	0	0	0	0	0	9	0
Darren Ward	4	0	1	0	0	0	0	0	5	0
Andy Williams	3	0	0	0	0	0	0	0	3	0
Total	68	1	3	1	8	0	0	0	79	2

=== Suspensions ===
Date	Suspended Player	Reason	Punishment	Missed Opponents
20 October 2012	(England) Aden Flint	(yellow card) (red card) vs. Scunthorpe United	3 Matches	Crewe Alexandra (A), Stevenage (A), Aston Villa (H)
3 November 2012	(England) Aden Flint	(red card) vs. Macclesfield Town	4 Matches	Sheffield United (H), Walsall (A), Yeovil Town (H), Brentford (H)
24 November 2012	(Republic of Ireland) Alan McCormack	(yellow card) Fifth Booking vs. Notts County	1 Match	Doncaster Rovers (H)

=== Monthly & Weekly Awards ===
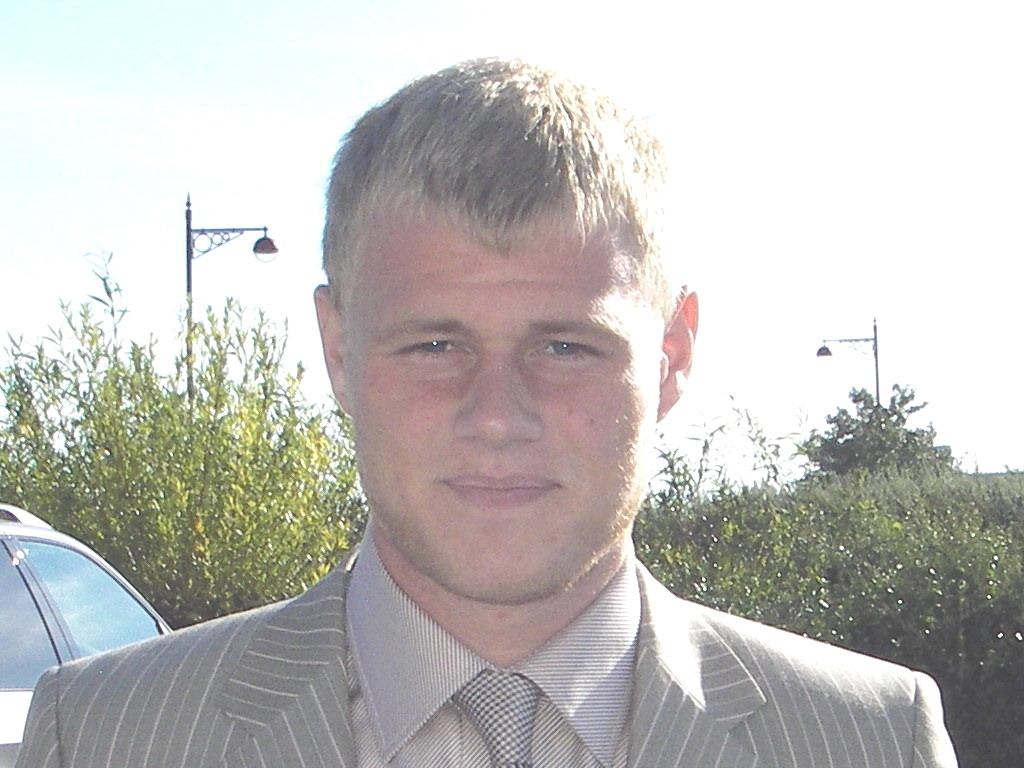
Jay McEveley was among the several Swindon players to earn places within the League One Team of the Week.

Date	Player	Award
28/08/12	(England) Matt Ritchie	League One Team of the Week
24/09/12	(England) Darren Ward	League One Team of the Week
01/10/12	(Scotland) Jay McEveley	League One Team of the Week
01/10/12	(Scotland) Simon Ferry	League One Team of the Week
08/10/12	(England) Aden Flint	League One Team of the Week
15/10/12	(Scotland) Jay McEveley	League One Team of the Week
22/10/12	(England) Nathan Thompson	League One Team of the Week
29/10/12	(England) Wes Foderingham	League One Team of the Week
12/11/12	(England) Wes Foderingham	League One Team of the Week
12/11/12	(England) Matt Ritchie	League One Team of the Week
19/11/12	(Republic of Ireland) James Collins	League One Team of the Week
17/12/12	(England) Wes Foderingham	League One Team of the Week
17/12/12	(Italy) Raffaele De Vita	League One Team of the Week
22/01/13	(England) Wes Foderingham	League One Team of the Week
22/01/13	(Republic of Ireland) Alan McCormack	League One Team of the Week
12/02/13	(Scotland) Simon Ferry	League One Team of the Week
11/03/13	(Republic of Ireland) Alan McCormack	League One Team of the Week
25/03/13	(Republic of Ireland) Alan McCormack	League One Team of the Week
22/03/12	(England) Aden Flint	League One Team of the Week
22/03/12	(England) Gary Roberts	League One Team of the Week
2012/13	(England) Nathan Thompson	Swindon Town Player of the Season
2013/13	(England) Wes Foderingham	PFA Team of the Year (League One)

== Transfers ==
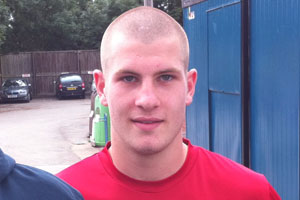
James Collins joined the club from Shrewsbury Town after a move to Coventry City fell through.

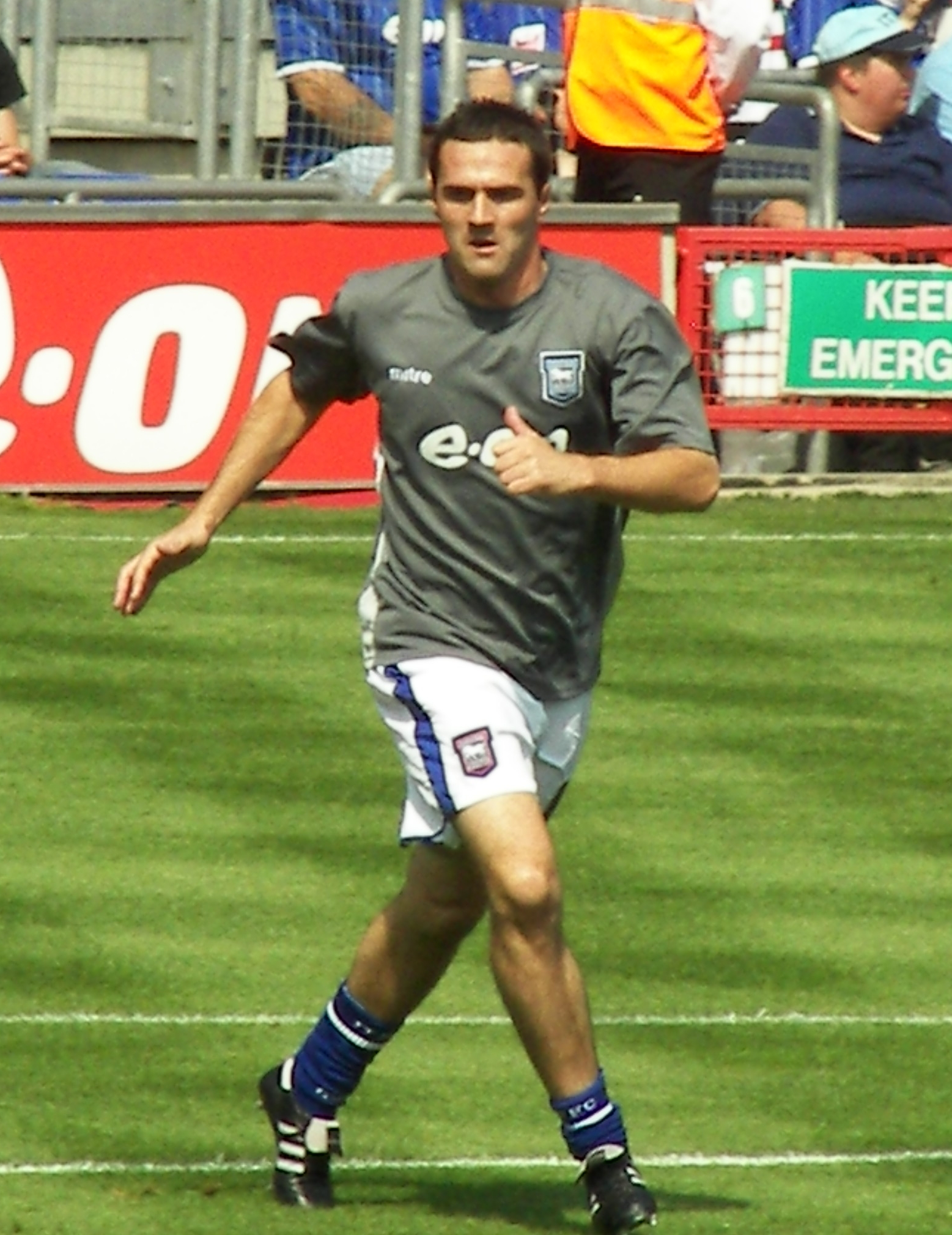
Veteran midfielder Tommy Miller joined the club after being released by Huddersfield Town.

Players transferred in
No.	Date	Pos.	Name	From	Fee	Ref.
1	18 June 2012	FW	(Republic of Ireland) James Collins	(England) Shrewsbury Town	Bosman	
2	18 June 2012	MF	(England) Gary Roberts	(England) Huddersfield Town	Free	
3	18 June 2012	FW	(England) Andy Williams	(England) Yeovil Town	Free	
4	21 June 2012	DF	(Scotland) James McEveley	(England) Barnsley	Free	
5	21 June 2012	MF	(England) Tommy Miller	(England) Huddersfield Town	Free	
6	21 June 2012	MF	(England) Alan Navarro	(England) Brighton & Hove Albion	Free	
7	26 June 2012	DF	(England) Troy Archibald-Henville	(England) Exeter City	Bosman	
8	31 August 2012	DF	(Argentina) Federico Bessone	(Wales) Swansea City	Free	
9	4 January 2013	DF	(England) Darren Ward	(England) Millwall	Free	
Players transferred out
No.	Date	Pos.	Name	To	Fee	Ref.
1	10 May 2012	MF	(Somalia) Abdul Said	(European Union) Released	Free	
2	24 May 2012	MF	(Netherlands) Etiënne Esajas	(European Union) Released	Released	
3	26 June 2012	FW	(Algeria) Mehdi Kerrouche	(Algeria) CS Constantine	Free	
4	27 June 2012	FW	(Czech Republic) Lukáš Magera	(Czech Republic) FK Mladá Boleslav	Free	
5	29 June 2012	GK	(Italy) Mattia Lanzano	(Italy) Gavorrano	Released	
6	1 July 2012	MF	(Spain) Lander Gabilondo	(Spain) SD Amorebieta	Released	
7	1 July 2012	DF	(England) Callum Kennedy	(England) Scunthorpe United	Released	
8	1 July 2012	GK	(England) Mark Scott	(England) Salisbury City	Released	
9	1 July 2012	GK	(England) Phil Smith	(England) Portsmouth	Released	
10	4 July 2012	FW	(Wales) Billy Bodin	(England) Torquay United	Undisclosed	
11	20 July 2012	FW	(England) Alan Connell	(England) Bradford City	Free	
12	21 July 2012	MF	(England) Jonathan Smith	(England) York City	Free	
13	22 August 2012	DF	(Italy) Alessandro Cibocchi	(European Union) Released	Free	
14	31 December 2012	DF	(Argentina) Federico Bessone	(European Union) Released	Free	
15	7 January 2013	MF	(Namibia) Oliver Risser	(England) Aldershot Town	Free	
16	30 January 2013	MF	(England) Matt Ritchie	(England) Bournemouth	£500,000	
Players loaned in
No.	Date from	Pos.	Name	From	Date to	Ref.
1	30 August 2012	DF	(England) Darren Ward	(England) Millwall	January 2013	
2	30 August 2012	MF	(England) John Bostock	(England) Tottenham Hotspur	January 2013	
3	31 August 2012	MF	(England) Giles Coke	(England) Sheffield Wednesday	January 2013	
4	31 August 2012	FW	(Republic of Ireland) Adam Rooney	(England) Birmingham City	June 2013	
5	15 November 2012	MF	(England) Danny Hollands	(England) Charlton Athletic	February 2013	
6	15 November 2012	FW	(England) Chris Martin	(England) Norwich City	February 2013	
7	28 March 2013	DF	(England) Nathan Byrne	(England) Tottenham Hotspur	End of the Season	
8	28 March 2013	MF	(Australia) Massimo Luongo	(England) Tottenham Hotspur	End of the Season	
9	28 March 2013	MF	(England) Dean Parrett	(England) Tottenham Hotspur	End of the Season	
Players loaned out
No.	Date from	Pos.	Name	To	Date to	Ref.
1	20 July 2012	MF	(England) Lee Cox	(England) Oxford United	January 2013	
2	31 August 2012	DF	(Scotland) Paul Caddis	(England) Birmingham City	June 2013	
3	31 August 2012	MF	(Namibia) Oliver Risser	(England) Stevenage	January 2013	
4	28 September 2012	MF	(England) Luke Rooney	(England) Burton Albion	October 2012	
5	11 October 2012	DF	(England) Chris Smith	(England) Northampton Town	January 2013	
6	9 November 2012	MF	(England) Luke Rooney	(England) Rotherham United	January 2013	
7	15 November 2012	FW	(England) Paul Benson	(England) Portsmouth	January 2013	
8	29 January 2013	FW	(England) Paul Benson	(England) Cheltenham Town	End of the Season	
9	8 February 2013	MF	(England) Lee Cox	(England) Plymouth Argyle	End of the Season	

=== Trial players ===
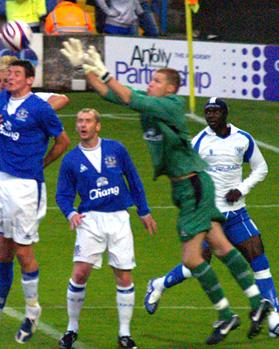
Iain Turner joined on trial in August 2012

Nat.	Player	Notes	Ref
(England)	Luke McCormick	Rehabilitation	
(England)	Paul Mooney	Trial	
(Italy)	Simone Materazzi	Trial	
(England)	Zavon Hines	Trial	
(Scotland)	Iain Turner	Trial	
(England)	Claudio Hoban	Samsung Win A Pro Contract finalist	
(England)	Kayden Jackson	Samsung Win A Pro Contract finalist	
(England)	Jack Sherratt	Samsung Win A Pro Contract finalist	

== Development Squad ==
In June 2011 it was announced that Swindon Town would not compete in a Reserve League for the 2011/12 season and would therefore arrange friendlies with other clubs. This decision remained in place for the following season.

=== Development Squad Results ===
28 August 2012	Portsmouth XI	3–1	Swindon Town XI	Portsmouth
BST		Report		Stadium: Wellington Sports Ground; Attendance: 0 (Behind closed doors)

15 January 2013	Newport County XI	3–2	Swindon Town XI	Newport
BST		Report		Attendance: 0 (Behind closed doors)

19 February 2013	Swindon Town XI	3–0	Bournemouth XI	Swindon
BST		Report		Attendance: 0 (Behind closed doors)

6 March 2013	Swindon Town XI	0–1	Combined Services	Burton upon Trent
BST		Report		Stadium: St George's Park National Football Centre; Attendance: 0 (Behind closed doors)
