= McKendry =

Surname of Scottish and Irish origin

Origin
- Origin: Scotland, Ireland
- Meaning: 1. "Son of Hendry"; 2. "Son of Henry"
- Region of origin: Scotland, Ireland

Other names
- Variant forms: Henderson, McHenry, McHendrie, McHendrick, McKendrick, McHendry, McKindrie, McHenri, Mac Eanraig and Mac Einri.

McKendry is a surname derived from Mac Eanraig in Scotland (a sept of Henderson Clan) and Mac Einri in Ireland (a sept of Clan Drugain), from "Mac" meaning son of, and the pre 6th century personal given name Henry resulting in McHenry / MacHenry, originally composed of the Germanic elements "heim" meaning "home" and "ric" - power. The name was introduced into England by the Normans at the Invasion of 1066 as Henri, and this spelling spread to both Scotland and Ireland. A variation of McKendry found in what is now the northeast coast of County Antrim, Northern Ireland, variously spelt as McKenry, McKenery, McHenry, McHendry, McEnry, McEndry, McEnrie etc was first used after the Battle of Aura where the forces of Sorley Boy McDonnell won a decisive victory over the McQuillans. Henry MacNaughton fought with the McDonnells and was granted land in the area in recognition of his service. His descendants termed themselves "sons of Henry (McNaughton) i.e. McHenry." The spelling variants are simply due to literacy levels of the next centuries and local pronunciation. Families could spell their name McHenry and have siblings and cousins who spelt it McEnry, McKendry etc. The families still farm the same land in current generations.

Notable people with the surname include:

- Alex McKendry — Canadian professional ice hockey player
- Ben McKendry — Canadian soccer player
- Chris McKendry — American journalist
- Gary McKendry — Northern Irish film and television commercial director
- James McKendry — Irish artist
- John McKendry — Canadian museum curator
- Maxime de la Falaise McKendry — English model, fashion designer and food writer
- Ned Mckendry — Australian swimmer, Olympic athlete, Commonwealth Games Gold-medallist
- Patrick McKendry — New Zealand Sports Journalist
- Sam McKendry — New Zealand professional Rugby League player

Mckendry is also the name of :

- Mckendry Lake in Canada
- McKendry's Coaches of Loanhead based in Edinburgh operating across the UK; member of FTA, which has had fines levied due to safety concerns

== See also ==
- Clan Henderson
- Clan Drugain
- McHenry
