= Craig Murray (disambiguation) =

Craig Murray is a Scottish activist and former diplomat.

Craig Murray may also refer to:

- Craig Murray (footballer) (born 1994), Scottish football player
- Craig Murray (ice hockey), Canadian ice hockey player in the 1998 NHL entry draft
- Craig Murray (racing driver), British driver in the 2001 British Formula Three Championship
