= McHenry (name) =

McHenry, sometimes spelled MacHenry, is both a surname and a given name, an anglicised name of the Scottish Clan Henderson. Notable people with the name include:

== Surname ==
- Alex McHenry (born 1997), Irish rugby union player
- Anthony McHenry (born 1983), American basketball player
- Austin McHenry (1895–1922), American baseball player
- Bob McHenry (footballer) (1919–2003), Australian rules footballer
- Dean McHenry (1910–1998), American professor of political science and founding chancellor of the University of California, Santa Cruz, father of anthropologist Henry McHenry
- Donald McHenry (born 1936), American diplomat
- Doug McHenry (born 1952), American film director and producer
- Edward McHenry (born 1983), half of the McHenry Brothers, British film directors and screenwriters
- Edwin Harrison McHenry (1859–1931), American engineer and railroad official
- Eric McHenry (born 1972), American poet
- Henry McHenry (anthropologist) (born 1944), American professor of anthropology
- Henry McHenry (baseball) (1910–1981), American Negro league baseball player
- Henry D. McHenry (1826–1890), American politician
- James McHenry (1753–1816), American Founding Father and physician
- James McHenry (lawyer), American lawyer, chief administrative hearing officer in the United States Department of Justice and former acting United States Attorney General (2025)
- James McHenry (novelist) (1785–1845), American writer, physician, and diplomat
- James W. McHenry (1864–1931), American mayor
- John G. McHenry (1868–1912), American politician
- John H. McHenry (1797–1871), American politician
- Leah McHenry (born 1984), Canadian musician
- Mary McHenry (1933–2021), American scholar
- Mary Sears McHenry (1834–1912), American community organizer
- Ned McHenry (born 2000), former Australian rules footballer
- Nellie McHenry (1853–1935), American stage actress
- Patrick McHenry (born 1975), American politician
- Robert McHenry (born 1945), American writer and editor
- Robert McHenry (rancher) (1827–1890), American rancher, politician, and banker, owner of McHenry Mansion
- Ron McHenry (born 1962), American former college women's basketball coach at Washburn University
- Rory Patrick McHenry (born 1987), half of the McHenry Brothers, British film directors and screenwriters
- Ross McHenry, Australian musician, band leader of the Shaolin Afronauts
- Russell McHenry (born 1950), former Australian rules footballer
- Tommy McHenry (1903–1972), Australian rules footballer
- Travis McHenry (born 1980), American micronation founder
- William McHenry (1771–1835), American soldier and politician

== Given name ==
- McHenry Boatwright (1928–1994), American opera singer and teacher
- MacHenry Schafer, American minister and activist
- McHenry Venaani (born 1977), Namibian politician

== See also ==
- McKendry (surname)
- Senator McHenry (disambiguation)
