= McKenry =

McKenry is a surname. Notable people with the surname include:

- Limb McKenry (1888–1956), American baseball player
- Michael McKenry (born 1985), American baseball player

== See also ==
- McHenry (name)
