= 2009–10 Inverness Caledonian Thistle F.C. season =

Scottish football club season

Inverness Caledonian Thistle
2009–10 season
- Manager: Terry Butcher
- Scottish First Division: 1st (promoted)
- Scottish Cup: Fifth round
- Scottish League Cup: Third round
- Scottish Challenge Cup: Runners-up
- Top goalscorer: Adam Rooney (24)

The 2009–10 season was Inverness Caledonian Thistle's first in the Scottish First Division since relegation from the Scottish Premier League the previous season.

== Scottish First Division ==
=== League table ===
| Pos | Team | Pld | W | D | L | GF | GA | GD | Pts | Promotion, qualification or relegation |
|---|---|---|---|---|---|---|---|---|---|---|
| 1 | Inverness Caledonian Thistle (C, P) | 36 | 21 | 10 | 5 | 72 | 32 | +40 | 73 | Promotion to the Premier League |
| 2 | Dundee | 36 | 16 | 13 | 7 | 48 | 34 | +14 | 61 | |
| 3 | Dunfermline Athletic | 36 | 17 | 7 | 12 | 54 | 44 | +10 | 58 | |
| 4 | Queen of the South | 36 | 15 | 11 | 10 | 53 | 40 | +13 | 56 | |
| 5 | Ross County | 36 | 15 | 11 | 10 | 46 | 44 | +2 | 56 | |

Source: Scottish Football League
Rules for classification: 1) points; 2) goal difference; 3) number of goals scored.
First Division play-offs: The 9th place team will be entered into a play-off with the 2nd, 3rd and 4th places of the Second Division. The winner gets a place in the 2010-11 First Division
(C) Champions; (P) Promoted

=== Matches ===
| 8 August 2009 | Dunfermline | 0–1 | Inverness Caledonian Thistle | East End Park |
| | | BBC SPORT | Cox 90+1' | Attendance: 2,975; Referee: Dougie McDonald |

| 15 August 2009 | Inverness Caledonian Thistle | 0–0 | Ayr United | Caledonian Stadium |
| | | BBC Sport | | Attendance: 3,297; Referee: Winter |

| 22 August 2009 | Dundee | 2–2 | Inverness Caledonian Thistle | Dens Park |
| | Harkins 9', 29' | BBC SPORT | Sanchez 20'; Cox 38' | Attendance: 5,507; Referee: Tumilty |

| 29 August 2009 | Inverness Caledonian Thistle | 1–3 | Ross County | Caledonian Stadium |
| | Hayes 60' | BBC Sport | di Giacomo 10'; Vigurs 53'; Brittain 76' | Attendance: 5,846; Referee: Finnie |

| 12 September 2009 | Morton | 0–3 | Inverness Caledonian Thistle | Cappielow |
| | | BBC SPORT | Sanchez 45'; Foran 60'; Proctor 85' | Attendance: 1,946; Referee: Richmond |

| 19 September 2009 | Airdrie United | 1–1 | Inverness Caledonian Thistle | Excelsior Stadium |
| | Baird 25' | BBC Sport | Hayes 83' | Attendance: 951; Referee: McKendrick |

| 26 September 2009 | Inverness Caledonian Thistle | 2–3 | Partick Thistle | Caledonian Stadium |
| | Rooney 63' (pen.); Foran 76' | BBC SPORT | Buchanan 38', 39'; Archibald 45' | Attendance: 3,218; Referee: E. Norris |

| 10 October 2009 | Inverness Caledonian Thistle | 1–3 | Queen of the South | Caledonian Stadium |
| | Hayes 18' | BBC SPORT | Holmes 1', 83', 90' | Attendance: 3,011; Referee: I. Brines |

| 13 October 2009 | Raith Rovers | 0–1 | Inverness Caledonian Thistle | Stark's Park |
| | | BBC SPORT | Proctor 83' | Attendance: 2,014; Referee: c Allen |

| 17 October 2009 | Inverness Caledonian Thistle | 1–1 | Dunfermline Athletic | Caledonian Stadium |
| | Proctor 45' | BBC SPORT | Kirk 69' | Attendance: 3,082; Referee: Muir |

| 24 October 2009 | Ayr United | 1–5 | Inverness Caledonian Thistle | Somerset Park |
| | Roberts 13' | BBC SPORT | Foran 11', 25', 57'; Rooney 15'; Imrie 21' | Attendance: 1,609; Referee: Collum |

| 31 October 2009 | Inverness Caledonian Thistle | 4–1 | Morton | Caledonian Stadium |
| | Rooney 19', 42', 51' (pen.); Bulvītis 31' | BBC SPORT | =Paartalu 33' | Attendance: 3,021; Referee: Murray |

| 7 November 2009 | Ross County | 2–1 | Inverness Caledonian Thistle | Victoria Park |
| | Boyd 18'; Gardyne 20' | BBC SPORT | Rooney 82' | Attendance: 5,506; Referee: Somers |

| 14 November 2009 | Inverness Caledonian Thistle | 2–0 | Airdrie United | Caledonian Stadium |
| | Sanchez 45'; Odhiambo 69' | BBC Sport | | Attendance: 2,780; Referee: MacKay |

| 28 November 2009 | Partick Thistle | 2–1 | Inverness Caledonian Thistle | Firhill Stadium |
| | Adams 53'; Lovell 68' | BBC SPORT | Tokely 7' | Attendance: 2,353; Referee: McDonald |

| 5 December 2009 | Queen of the South | 1–1 | Inverness Caledonian Thistle | Palmerston Park |
| | Harris 75'; Lilley (red card) 77' | BBC SPORT | Hayes 18'; Foran (yellow card) 75' (red card); Duncan (red card) 77' | Attendance: 2,196; Referee: Muir |

| 12 December 2009 | Inverness Caledonian Thistle | 1–0 | Raith Rovers | Caledonian Stadium |
| | Rooney 23' | BBC Sport | Hill (yellow card) 69' (red card) | Attendance: 2,768; Referee: McDermott |

| 19 December 2009 | Dunfermline Athletic | 0–0 | Inverness Caledonian Thistle | East End Park |
| | | BBC SPORT | | Attendance: 2,280; Referee: J. McKendrick |

| 26 December 2009 | Inverness Caledonian Thistle | 1–1 | Dundee | Caledonian Stadium |
| | Rooney 57' | BBC SPORT | Griffiths 45' (pen.); Harkins (yellow card) 85' (red card) | Attendance: 3,660; Referee: S. Nicholls |

| 23 January 2010 | Airdrie United | 0–1 | Inverness Caledonian Thistle | Excelsior Stadium |
| | | BBC SPORT | Rooney 43' (pen.) | Attendance: 839; Referee: McLean |

| 30 January 2010 | Inverness Caledonian Thistle | 2–1 | Partick Thistle | Caledonian Stadium |
| | Hayes 38'; Rooney 89' (pen.) | BBC SPORT | Corcoran 16'; Maxwell (red card) 88' | Attendance: 3,107; Referee: Somers |

| 13 February 2010 | Raith Rovers | 0–4 | Inverness Caledonian Thistle | Starks Park |
| | | BBC SPORT | Rooney 67'; Hayes 70'; Bulvītis 77'; Stratford 90' | Attendance: 1,568; Referee: C. Thomson |

| 27 February 2010 | Inverness Caledonian Thistle | 3–3 | Ayr United | Caledonian Stadium |
| | Foran 45'; Hayes 61'; Rooney 90' (pen.) | BBC SPORT | Aitken 25'; Roberts 30'; McManus 71' | Attendance: 2,843; Referee: S. MacDonald |

| 1 March 2010 | Dundee | 2–2 | Inverness Caledonian Thistle | Dens Park |
| | Kerr 78'; Harkins 84' | BBC SPORT | Foran 46'; Odhiambo 59' | Attendance: 4,974; Referee: Brown |

| 9 March 2010 | Inverness Caledonian Thistle | 3–1 | Queen of the South | Caledonian Stadium |
| | Rooney 42', 52', 76' (pen.) | BBC SPORT | Holmes 61' (pen.) | Attendance: 3,003; Referee: C. Allan |

| 13 March 2010 | Inverness Caledonian Thistle | 1–0 | Morton | Caledonian Stadium |
| | Ross 65' | BBC SPORT | | Attendance: 2,788; Referee: S. McLean |

| 20 March 2010 | Ross County | 0–0 | Inverness Caledonian Thistle | Victoria Park |
| | | BBC SPORT | | Attendance: 5,928; Referee: M. Tumilty |

| 23 March 2010 | Inverness Caledonian Thistle | 4–0 | Airdrie United | Caledonian Stadium |
| | Rooney 10'; Foran 24'; Munro 47'; Hayes 83' | BBC SPORT | | Attendance: 2,008; Referee: C. Murray |

| 27 March 2010 | Partick Thistle | 0–1 | Inverness Caledonian Thistle | Firhill Stadium |
| | | BBC Sport | Rooney 32' | Attendance: 2,380; Referee: McDermott |

| 30 March 2010 | Inverness Caledonian Thistle | 3–0 | Ross County | Caledonian Stadium |
| | Foran 14'; Odhiambo 16'; Hayes 40' | BBC Sport | Keddie (red card) 13' | Attendance: 5,411; Referee: McDonald |

| 3 April 2010 | Inverness Caledonian Thistle | 4–3 | Raith Rovers | Caledonian Stadium |
| | Foran 29', 90'; Rooney 41'; Odhiambo 57' | BBC Sport | Williamson 12'; Tadé 66'; Mole 74'; Simmons (yellow card) 88' (red card) | Attendance: 3,562; Referee: Muir |

| 6 April 2010 | Morton | 0–2 | Inverness Caledonian Thistle | Cappielow Park |
| | | BBC Sport | Foran 6'; Rooney 85' | Attendance: 1,277; Referee: Winter |

| 10 April 2010 | Queen of the South | 1–3 | Inverness Caledonian Thistle | Palmerston Park |
| | McLaren 10'; Harris (red card) 74' | BBC Sport | Rooney 42', 88'; Munro 67' | Attendance: 2,093; Referee: C. Richmond |

| 17 April 2010 | Inverness Caledonian Thistle | 2–0 | Dunfermline Athletic | Caledonian Stadium |
| | Rooney 55'; Foran 62' | BBC Sport | | Attendance: 3,728; Referee: W. Collum |

| 24 April 2010 | Ayr United | 0–7 | Inverness Caledonian Thistle | Somerset Park |
| | | BBC Sport | Hayes 2'; Rooney 10'; Foran 13'; Odhiambo 42'; Sanchez 75'; Eagle 85'; Morrison 89' | Attendance: 3,031; Referee: O'Reilly |

| 1 May 2010 | Inverness Caledonian Thistle | 1–0 | Dundee | Caledonian Stadium |
| | Rooney 28' | BBC Sport | | Attendance: 6,031; Referee: S. Conroy |

== Scottish Cup ==
| 18 January 2010 Fourth round | Inverness Caledonian Thistle | 2–0 | Motherwell | Caledonian Stadium |
| | Bulvītis 43'; Imrie 62' | BBC SPORT | | Attendance: 1,450; Referee: Brines |

| 6 February 2010 Fifth round | Kilmarnock | 3–0 | Inverness Caledonian Thistle | Rugby Park |
| | Sammon 28'; Kelly 36', 59' | BBC SPORT | | Attendance: 4,473; Referee: O'Reilly |

== Scottish League Cup ==
| 1 August 2009 First round | Inverness Caledonian Thistle | 4–0 | Annan Athletic | Caledonian Stadium |
| | Rooney 21'; Eagle 52'; Imrie 72'; Sanchez 88' | | | Attendance: 1,095; Referee: McLean |

| 25 August 2009 Second round | Inverness Caledonian Thistle | 4–0 | Albion Rovers | Caledonian Stadium |
| | Eagle 8'; Rooney 16'; Bulvītis 41'; Munro 57' | BBC SPORT | | Attendance: 681; Referee: Somers |

| 22 September 2009 Third round | Motherwell | 3–2 (a.e.t.) | Inverness Caledonian Thistle | Fir Park |
| | McHugh 33' Bulvītis 94' (o.g.) Forbes 119' | BBC Sport | Barrowman 70'; Munro 111' | Attendance: 3,905; Referee: McDonald |

== Scottish Challenge Cup ==
| 25 July 2009 First round | Inverness Caledonian Thistle | 1–1 (5–3 p) | Montrose | Caledonian Stadium |
| | Crighton 45' (o.g.) | BBC SPORT | Leyden 87' | Attendance: 1,072; Referee: Smith |

| 18 August 2009 Second round | Inverness Caledonian Thistle | 3–0 | Stranraer | Caledonian Stadium |
| | Foran 19', 32'; Sanchez 29' | BBC SPORT | Lyle 83' | Attendance: 664; Referee: Charleston |

| 6 September 2009 Quarter-final | Partick Thistle | 1–1 (3–4 p) | Inverness Caledonian Thistle | Firhill Stadium |
| | Buchanan 77' | BBC Sport | Sanchez 6' | Attendance: 1,746; Referee: Tumilty |

| 4 October 2009 Semi-final | Inverness Caledonian Thistle | 1–0 | Ross County | Caledonian Stadium |
| | Eagle 44' | BBC SPORT | Lyle 83' | Attendance: 2,275; Referee: Charleston |

| 22 November 2009 Final | Dundee | 3–2 | Inverness Caledonian Thistle | McDiarmid Park |
| | Bulvītis 48' (o.g.); Harkins 53'; Forsyth 83' | BBC Sport | Rooney 20'; Bulvītis 33'; Imrie (red card) 90' | Attendance: 8,031; Referee: Tumilty |

== Hat-tricks ==
| Player | Competition | Score | Opponent | Date |
|---|---|---|---|---|
| (Republic of Ireland) Richie Foran | Scottish First Division | 1–5 | Ayr United | 24 October 2009 |
| (Republic of Ireland) Adam Rooney | Scottish First Division | 4–1 | Morton | 31 October 2009 |
| (Republic of Ireland) Adam Rooney | Scottish First Division | 3–1 | Queen of the South | 9 March 2010 |

== Transfers ==
Transfers In
| Player | Age | From | Free |
|---|---|---|---|
| (England) Robert Eagle | 22 | (England) Norwich City | Free |
| (Republic of Ireland) Jonny Hayes | 22 | (England) Leicester City | Free |
| (Scotland) Stuart Golabek | 34 | (Scotland) Ross County | Free |
| (Spain) Dani Sánchez | 24 | (Spain) Real Murcia Imperial | Free |
| (England) Lee Cox | 18 | (England) Leicester City | Undisclosed |
| (England) Dan Stratford | 24 | (United States) D.C. United | Free |
| (Latvia) Nauris Bulvitis | 22 | (Latvia) FC Tranzits | Loan |
| (Scotland) Stuart Duff | 27 | (Scotland) Aberdeen | Loan |

| Player | Age | To | Fee |
|---|---|---|---|
| (Scotland) Dougie Imrie | 26 | (Scotland) Hamilton Academical | £54,000 |
| (Scotland) Iain Vigurs | 21 | (Scotland) Ross County | Free |
| (Canada) Richard Hastings | 32 | (Scotland) Hamilton Academical | Free |
| (Scotland) Ian Black | 24 | (Scotland) Heart of Midlothian | Free |
| (Scotland) Garry Wood | 21 | (Scotland) Ross County | Free |
| (Scotland) Ally Ridgers | 27 | (Scotland) Nairn County | Free |
| (Scotland) Brian Kerr | 27 | (Scotland) Dundee | Free |
| (Portugal) Filipe Morais | 23 | (Scotland) St Johnstone | Free |
| (Scotland) Dale Gillespie | 20 | (Scotland) Nairn County | Free |
| (Scotland) Andy Barrowman | 25 | (Scotland) Ross County | Free |
| (Republic of Ireland) Andy McNulty | 20 | (Republic of Ireland) Bray Wanderers | Free |
| (Scotland) Michael Fraser | 25 | (Scotland) Motherwell | Undisclosed |
| (Latvia) Pāvels Mihadjuks | 29 | (Latvia) FK Ventspils | Undisclosed |
| (Republic of Ireland) Richie Byrne | 27 | (England) Darlington | Free |
| (Scotland) Zander Sutherland | 21 | (Scotland) Peterhead | Free |
| (Scotland) Shane Sutherland | 19 | (Scotland) Elgin City | Loan |
| (Scotland) Gavin Morrison | 19 | (Scotland) Elgin City | Loan |
