= 2014–15 Aberdeen F.C. season =

Aberdeen
2014–15 season
- Chairman: Stewart Milne
- Manager: Derek McInnes
- Stadium: Pittodrie Stadium
- Scottish Premiership: 2nd
- League Cup: Semi-final (lost to Dundee United)
- Scottish Cup: Fourth round (lost to Dundee)
- Europa League: Third qualifying round
- Top goalscorer: League: Adam Rooney (18); All: Adam Rooney (28)
- Highest home attendance: 19,051 vs. Celtic, Premiership, 9 November 2014
- Lowest home attendance: 6,454 vs. Livingston, League Cup, 23 September 2014
- Average home league attendance: 13,359
Home colours	Away colours

The 2014–15 season was Aberdeen's 102nd season in the top flight of Scottish football and the second in the Scottish Premiership. Aberdeen also competed in the Europa League, League Cup and the Scottish Cup.

== Season summary ==
After securing second spot, manager Derek McInnes was nominated for manager of the year. After banging in almost 30 goals in the season for the club, Adam Rooney was nominated for PFA player of the year. Adam Rooney and Shay Logan were named in PFA Scotland Team of the Year.

== Results and fixtures ==
Win Draw Loss Postponed

=== Friendly matches ===
Aberdeen played five friendly matches; four took place in pre-season and one in March.

21 June 2014 Friendly	St Patrick's Athletic	2–2	Aberdeen	Dublin, Ireland
16:00 BST UTC+1	Quigley 2'; Forrester 17'	Report	Rooney 50'; McGinn 60'	Stadium: Richmond Park; Attendance: 500

25 June 2014 Friendly	Brechin City	1–4	Aberdeen	Brechin
19:45 BST UTC+1	Thomson 78'	Report	Jack 43'; McGinn 73'; Shankland 79'; McManus 90'	Stadium: Glebe Park; Attendance: 1,102

28 June 2014 Friendly	Arbroath	0–7	Aberdeen	Arbroath
15:00 BST UTC+1		Report	Reynolds 11'; Robson 28', 40'; Pawlett 55'; Flood 63'; Rooney 75'; McManus 88'	Stadium: Gayfield Park; Attendance: 1,879; Referee: Kevin Clancy

6 July 2014 Friendly	Peterhead	0–1	Aberdeen	Peterhead
13:00 BST UTC+1		Report	Shankland 61'	Stadium: Balmoor Stadium; Attendance: 1,087

27 March 2015 Andrew Considine Testimonial	Aberdeen	1–2	FC Twente	Aberdeen
19:30	Shankland 73'	Report	Ziyech 26'; Eghan 69'	Stadium: Pittodrie Stadium; Attendance: 6,193; Referee: Don Robertson

=== Scottish Premiership ===
==== Results ====
10 August 2014 Scottish Premiership	Aberdeen	0–3	Dundee United	Pittodrie Stadium
15:00 BST UTC+1		BBC Report	Dow 29'; Mackay-Steven 45'; Erskine 90'	Attendance: 16,471; Referee: Collum

13 August 2014 Scottish Premiership	Kilmarnock	0–2	Aberdeen	Rugby Park
19:45 BST UTC+1		BBC Report	Pawlett 45'; Jack 71'	Attendance: 5,079; Referee: Allan

16 August 2014 Scottish Premiership	Aberdeen	–	St Mirren	Pittodrie Stadium
15:00 BST UTC+1

23 August 2014 Scottish Premiership	St Johnstone	1–0	Aberdeen	McDiarmid Park
15:00 BST UTC+1	MacLean 80'	Report		Attendance: 6,377; Referee: Thomson

30 August 2014 Scottish Premiership	Aberdeen	2–0	Partick Thistle	Pittodrie Stadium
15:00 BST UTC+1	Low 47'; McGinn 66'	Report		Attendance: 11,003; Referee: Brian Colvin

13 September 2014 Scottish Premiership	Celtic	2–1	Aberdeen	Celtic Park
12:45 BST UTC+1	Denayer 7'; Commons 46'	Report	Goodwillie 60'	Attendance: 43,640; Referee: Madden

20 September 2014 Scottish Premiership	Aberdeen	3–0	Ross County	Pittodrie Stadium
15:00 BST UTC+1	Rooney 20'; Goodwillie 26'; Pawlett 50'	Report		Attendance: 10,865; Referee: Thomson

27 September 2014 Scottish Premiership	Aberdeen	3–2	Inverness Caledonian Thistle	Pittodrie Stadium
15:00 BST UTC+1	Rooney 24'; Logan 40'; Hayes 59'	Report	Meekings 16'; Watkins 50'	Attendance: 11,414; Referee: Beaton

30 September 2014 Scottish Premiership	Aberdeen	2–2	St Mirren	Pittodrie Stadium
19:45 BST UTC+1	Reynolds 45'; Pawlett 56'	Report	Ball 57'; McLean 86' (pen.)	Attendance: 10,373; Referee: Allan

4 October 2014 Scottish Premiership	Dundee	2–3	Aberdeen	Dens Park
15:00 BST UTC+1	Harkins 6'; Clarkson 55' (pen.)	Report	Considine 5'; McPake 28' (o.g.); Goodwillie 64'	Attendance: 8,784; Referee: Collum

17 October 2014 Scottish Premiership	Hamilton Academical	3–0	Aberdeen	New Douglas Park
19:45 BST UTC+1	Andreu 15', 53'; Antoine-Curier 90'	Report		Attendance: 4,093; Referee: Clancy

24 October 2014 Scottish Premiership	Aberdeen	1–0	Motherwell	Pittodrie Stadium
19:45 BST UTC+1	Hayes 2'	Report		Attendance: 11,149; Referee: Allan

3 November 2014 Scottish Premiership	Ross County	0–1	Aberdeen	Victoria Park
19:45 GMT UTC+0		Report	Quinn 56' (o.g.)	Attendance: 3,745; Referee: Collum

9 November 2014 Scottish Premiership	Aberdeen	1–2	Celtic	Pittodrie Stadium
12:30 GMT UTC+0	Rooney 27'; Logan (red card) 90'	BBC	Johansen 38' van Dijk 90'; Brown (yellow card) 68' (yellow-red card) 82'	Attendance: 19,051; Referee: Muir

23 November 2014 Scottish Premiership	Partick Thistle	0–1	Aberdeen	Firhill Stadium
12:45 GMT UTC+0		BBC	Rooney 34' (pen.)	Attendance: 4,145; Referee: Collum

6 December 2014 Scottish Premiership	Aberdeen	3–0	Hamilton Academical	Pittodrie Stadium
15:00 GMT UTC+0	Taylor 28'; McGinn 51'; Rooney 55' (pen.)	BBC; AFC		Attendance: 10,330; Referee: Brian Colvin

13 December 2014 Scottish Premiership	Dundee United	0–2	Aberdeen	Tannadice Park
15:00 GMT UTC+0		BBC; AFC	Rooney 19', 33'	Attendance: 11,196; Referee: Allan

20 December 2014 Scottish Premiership	Aberdeen	1–0	Kilmarnock	Pittodrie Stadium
15:00 GMT UTC+0	Pawlett 69'	BBC; AFC		Attendance: 11,282; Referee: Andrew Dallas

28 December 2014 Scottish Premiership	Inverness Caledonian Thistle	0–1	Aberdeen	Caledonian Stadium
15:00 GMT UTC+0		BBC; AFC	Pawlett 12'	Attendance: 6,614; Referee: Murray

1 January 2015 Scottish Premiership	Aberdeen	2–0	St Johnstone	Pittodrie Stadium
15:00 GMT UTC+0	Goodwillie 6'; Smith 93'	BBC; AFC		Attendance: 15,263; Referee: Thomson

4 January 2015 Scottish Premiership	Motherwell	0–2	Aberdeen	Fir Park
15:30 GMT UTC+0	McManus (red card) 88'	BBC; AFC	Rooney 36', 89' (pen.)	Attendance: 4,805; Referee: Collum

10 January 2015 Scottish Premiership	St Mirren	0–2	Aberdeen	St Mirren Park
15:00 GMT UTC+0		BBC; AFC	McGinn 31'; Logan 33'	Attendance: 4,977; Referee: McLean

17 January 2015 Scottish Premiership	Aberdeen	3–3	Dundee	Pittodrie Stadium
15:00 GMT UTC+0	Goodwillie 7'; Hayes 87' (pen.); Jack 92'	BBC; AFC	Irvine 38'; Stewart 40'; Harkins 48'	Attendance: 16,796; Referee: Muir

23 January 2015 Scottish Premiership	St Johnstone	1–1	Aberdeen	McDiarmid Park
19:45 GMT UTC+0	Lappin 30'	BBC; AFC	Rooney 57'	Attendance: 4,845; Referee: Madden

7 February 2015 Scottish Premiership	Aberdeen	4–0	Ross County	Pittodrie Stadium
15:00 GMT UTC+0	Rooney 12'; Pawlett 50'; Logan 61'; Goodwillie 85'	BBC; AFC		Attendance: 12,036; Referee: Thomson

15 February 2015 Scottish Premiership	Hamilton Academical	0–3	Aberdeen	New Douglas Park
15:30 GMT UTC+0	Tena (yellow card) 52' (yellow-red card) 60'	BBC	Considine 6'; Jack 8'; McGinn 88'	Attendance: 3,095; Referee: Collum

21 February 2015 Scottish Premiership	Aberdeen	3–0	St Mirren	Pittodrie Stadium
15:00 GMT UTC+0	Rooney 21', 48'; Reynolds 66'	BBC		Attendance: 14,720; Referee: Clancy

1 March 2015 Scottish Premiership	Celtic	4–0	Aberdeen	Celtic Park
12:00 GMT UTC+0	Denayer 37'; Griffiths 63' (pen.); Mackay-Steven 69'; Johansen 80'	BBC		Attendance: 50,256; Referee: Beaton

13 March 2015 Scottish Premiership	Aberdeen	2–1	Motherwell	Pittodrie Stadium
19:45 GMT UTC+0	Taylor 50'; Rooney 52'	BBC; AFC	McDonald 37'	Attendance: 13,267 (46 Motherwell); Referee: Crawford Allan; Man of the Match: Ash Taylor

21 March 2015 Scottish Premiership	Dundee	1–1	Aberdeen	Dens Park
12:15 GMT UTC+0	McGinn 69'	BBC	Rooney 36'	Attendance: 7,014; Referee: Thomson

4 April 2015 Scottish Premiership	Aberdeen	0–0	Partick Thistle	Pittodrie Stadium
15:00 GMT UTC+0		BBC		Attendance: 12,727; Referee: Clancy

8 April 2015 Scottish Premiership	Aberdeen	1–0	Inverness Caledonian Thistle	Pittodrie Stadium
19:45 GMT UTC+0	Taylor 47'	BBC		Attendance: 11,319; Referee: Calum Murray; Man of the Match: Barry Robson

12 April 2015 Scottish Premiership	Kilmarnock	1–2	Aberdeen	Rugby Park
12:15 GMT UTC+0	Slater 47'	BBC	Rooney 40'; Smith 69'	Attendance: 3,525; Referee: Beaton

18 April 2015 Scottish Premiership	Aberdeen	1–0	Dundee United	Pittodrie Stadium
15:00 GMT UTC+0	Rooney 39'; Robson (red card) 72'	BBC		Attendance: 12,619; Referee: Madden

25 April 2015 Scottish Premiership	Inverness Caledonian Thistle	1–2	Aberdeen	Caledonian Stadium
15:00	Ofere 48'	BBC	Raven 69' (o.g.); McGinn 74'	Attendance: 4,530; Referee: Crawford Allan

2 May 2015 Scottish Premiership	Dundee United	1–0	Aberdeen	Tannadice Park
15:00	Muirhead 13'	BBC		Attendance: 8,686; Referee: John Beaton

10 May 2015 Scottish Premiership	Aberdeen	0–1	Celtic	Pittodrie Stadium
14:30		BBC	Brown 49'	Attendance: 16,742; Referee: Thomson

16 May 2015 Scottish Premiership	Dundee	1–1	Aberdeen	Dens Park
15:00	Tankulić 43'	BBC	Rooney 90'	Attendance: 6,434; Referee: Euan Anderson

24 May 2015 Scottish Premiership	Aberdeen	0–1	St Johnstone	Pittodrie Stadium
12:30		BBC	Chris Kane 70'	Attendance: 16,389; Referee: Collum

=== UEFA Europa League ===
==== Qualifying phase ====
3 July 2014 First qualifying round 1st leg	Aberdeen	5–0	(Latvia) Daugava Rīga	Aberdeen, Scotland
19:45 BST UTC+1	Logan 33'; McGinn 49'; Rooney 52' (pen.), 90+2'; Hayes 73'	UEFA; BBC	V.Ziļs (yellow card) 16' (yellow-red card) 55'; Kučys (yellow card) 52' (yellow-red card) 81'	Stadium: Pittodrie Stadium; Attendance: 15,184; Referee: Rainville (France)

10 July 2014 First qualifying round 2nd leg	Daugava Rīga (Latvia)	0–3 (0–8 agg.)	Aberdeen	Riga, Latvia
17:30 BST UTC+1		UEFA; BBC	Rooney 22', 40', 45'	Stadium: Daugava Stadium; Attendance: 600; Referee: Vilkov (Russia)

17 July 2014 Second qualifying round 1st leg	Aberdeen	0–0	(Netherlands) FC Groningen	Aberdeen, Scotland
19:45 BST UTC+1		UEFA; BBC		Stadium: Pittodrie Stadium; Attendance: 16,523; Referee: Miguel (Portugal)

24 July 2014 Second qualifying round 2nd leg	FC Groningen (Netherlands)	1–2 (1–2 agg.)	Aberdeen	Groningen, Netherlands
18:30 BST UTC+1	Kieftenbeld 44'	UEFA; BBC	Rooney 26' (pen.); McGinn 33'	Stadium: Euroborg; Attendance: 22,550; Referee: Stefański (Poland)

31 July 2014 Third qualifying round 1st leg	Real Sociedad (Spain)	2–0	Aberdeen	Sebastián, Spain
19:30 BST UTC+1	Zurutuza 53'; Canales 68'	UEFA; BBC		Stadium: Anoeta Stadium; Attendance: 15,000; Referee: Bastian Dankert (Germany)

7 August 2014 Third qualifying round 2nd leg	Aberdeen	2–3 (2–5 agg.)	(Spain) Real Sociedad	Aberdeen, Scotland
19:45 BST UTC+1	Pawlett 44'; Reynolds 57'	UEFA; BBC	Xabi Prieto 28', 86' (pen.); Bergara 90+1'	Stadium: Pittodrie Stadium; Attendance: 17,676; Referee: Shmuelevitz (Israel)

=== Scottish League Cup ===
23 September 2014 Third Round	Aberdeen	4–0	Livingston	Pittodrie Stadium
19:45 BST UTC+1	Taylor 8'; Rooney 61', 74', 87'	Report		Attendance: 6,454; Referee: Andrew Dallas

28 October 2014 Quarter Final	Aberdeen	1–0	Hamilton Academical	Pittodrie Stadium
19:45 BST UTC+1	Rooney 24'	BBC		Attendance: 9,311; Referee: Madden

31 January 2015 Semi Final	Aberdeen	1–2	Dundee United	Hampden Park
15:00 GMT UTC+0	Daniels 49'	BBC; AFC	Morris 60'; Çiftçi 84'	Attendance: 29,608; Referee: McLean

=== Scottish Cup ===
29 November 2014 Fourth Round	Dundee	2–1	Aberdeen	Dens Park
12:15 GMT UTC+0	Konrad 4'; Clarkson 90'	Report	Konrad 17' (o.g.)	Attendance: 5,956; Referee: McLean

== Squad statistics ==
During the 2014–15 season, Aberdeen have used twenty nine different players in competitive games. The table below shows the number of appearances and goals scored by each player.

=== Appearances ===
As of 24 May 2015

No.	Pos	Nat	Player	Total		Premiership		Europa League		League Cup		Scottish Cup	
No.	Pos	Nat	Player	Apps	Goals	Apps	Goals	Apps	Goals	Apps	Goals	Apps	Goals
1	GK	(Scotland) SCO	Jamie Langfield	19	0	13	0	6	0	0	0	0	0
2	DF	(England) ENG	Shay Logan	45	4	35	3	6	1	3	0	1	0
3	DF	(Scotland) SCO	Andrew Considine	45	2	36+1	2	3+1	0	2+1	0	1	0
4	DF	(Scotland) SCO	Russell Anderson (c)	7	0	2	0	5	0	0	0	0	0
5	DF	(Wales) WAL	Ash Taylor	37	3	31+1	2	1+1	0	2	1	1	0
6	DF	(Scotland) SCO	Mark Reynolds	47	3	37	2	6	1	3	0	1	0
7	MF	(England) ENG	Jeffrey Monakana	10	0	0+10	0	0	0	0	0	0	0
7	MF	(Scotland) SCO	Kenny McLean	13	0	11+2	0	0	0	0	0	0	0
8	MF	(Republic of Ireland) IRL	Willo Flood	33	0	22+3	0	6	0	2	0	0	0
9	FW	(Republic of Ireland) IRL	Adam Rooney	47	28	32+5	18	5+1	6	3	4	1	0
10	FW	(Northern Ireland) NIR	Niall McGinn	45	7	34+2	5	6	2	2	0	1	0
11	MF	(Republic of Ireland) IRL	Jonny Hayes	41	4	31	3	6	1	3	0	1	0
14	FW	(Scotland) SCO	Cammy Smith	29	2	5+18	2	0+2	0	0+3	0	0+1	0
15	MF	(Scotland) SCO	Barry Robson	27	0	9+11	0	4+1	0	0+2	0	0	0
16	MF	(Scotland) SCO	Peter Pawlett	45	7	28+8	6	5	1	3	0	1	0
17	FW	(Scotland) SCO	David Goodwillie	38	6	21+10	6	1+3	0	2	0	1	0
18	MF	(Scotland) SCO	Nicky Low	13	1	3+4	1	0+5	0	1	0	0	0
19	DF	(Scotland) SCO	Clark Robertson	1	0	0+1	0	0	0	0	0	0	0
20	GK	(England) ENG	Scott Brown	29	0	25	0	0	0	3	0	1	0
21	DF	(Republic of Ireland) IRL	Joe Shaughnessy	3	0	1+2	0	0	0	0	0	0	0
22	MF	(Scotland) SCO	Ryan Jack	42	3	30+2	3	6	0	3	0	1	0
25	FW	(Scotland) SCO	Lawrence Shankland	17	0	2+15	0	0	0	0	0	0	0
28	DF	(Montserrat) MSR	Donervon Daniels	10	1	7+2	0	0	0	1	1	0	0
29	MF	(England) ENG	Andrew Driver	1	0	1	0	0	0	0	0	0	0
32	MF	(Scotland) SCO	Kieran Gibbons	1	0	0+1	0	0	0	0	0	0	0
37	DF	(Scotland) SCO	Daniel Harvie	0	0	0	0	0	0	0	0	0	0
38	MF	(Scotland) SCO	Frank Ross	2	0	0+2	0	0	0	0	0	0	0
39	FW	(Scotland) SCO	Scott Wright	3	0	0+1	0	0+2	0	0	0	0	0
Players who left the club on loan during the 2014–15 season
23	MF	(Scotland) SCO	Jamie Masson (on loan to Brechin City F.C.)	0	0	0	0	0	0	0	0	0	0
24	FW	(Scotland) SCO	Declan McManus (on loan to Greenock Morton F.C.)	1	0	0	0	0+1	0	0	0	0	0
26	MF	(Scotland) SCO	Craig Storie (on loan to Brechin City F.C.)	0	0	0	0	0	0	0	0	0	0
27	MF	(Scotland) SCO	Craig Murray (on loan to Ayr United F.C.)	2	0	1+1	0	0	0	0	0	0	0
30	GK	(Republic of Ireland) IRL	Danny Rogers (on loan to Dumbarton F.C.)	0	0	0	0	0	0	0	0	0	0

=== Disciplinary record ===
As of 24 May 2015

Number	Nation	Position	Name	Premiership		Europa League		League Cup		Scottish Cup		Total	
Number	Nation	Position	Name	Yellow card	Red card	Yellow card	Red card	Yellow card	Red card	Yellow card	Red card	Yellow card	Red card
2	(England)	DF	Shay Logan	4	1	2	0	0	0	0	0	6	1
3	(Scotland)	DF	Andrew Considine	4	0	0	0	0	0	0	0	4	0
4	(Scotland)	DF	Russell Anderson	1	0	0	0	0	0	0	0	1	0
6	(Scotland)	DF	Mark Reynolds	2	0	0	0	0	0	0	0	2	0
7	(England)	MF	Jeffrey Monakana	1	0	0	0	0	0	0	0	1	0
8	(Republic of Ireland)	MF	Willo Flood	5	0	0	0	1	0	0	0	6	0
9	(Republic of Ireland)	FW	Adam Rooney	3	0	2	0	0	0	0	0	5	0
11	(Republic of Ireland)	MF	Jonny Hayes	3	0	3	0	0	0	0	0	6	0
15	(Scotland)	MF	Barry Robson	7	1	0	0	0	0	0	0	7	1
16	(Scotland)	MF	Peter Pawlett	4	0	0	0	1	0	0	0	5	0
17	(Scotland)	FW	David Goodwillie	2	0	0	0	0	0	0	0	2	0
18	(Scotland)	MF	Nicky Low	0	0	1	0	0	0	0	0	1	0
21	(Republic of Ireland)	DF	Joe Shaughnessy	1	0	0	0	0	0	0	0	1	0
22	(Scotland)	MF	Ryan Jack	5	0	0	0	1	0	1	0	7	0
			TOTALS	43	2	8	0	3	0	1	0	55	2

=== Goal scorers ===
As of 24 May 2015

Ranking	Nation	Number	Name	Scottish Premiership	Scottish Cup	League Cup	Europe	Total
1	(Republic of Ireland)	9	Adam Rooney	18	0	4	6	28
2	(Scotland)	16	Peter Pawlett	6	0	0	1	7
2	(Northern Ireland)	10	Niall McGinn	5	0	0	2	7
4	(Scotland)	17	David Goodwillie	6	0	0	0	6
5	(England)	2	Shay Logan	3	0	0	1	4
5	(Wales)	5	Ash Taylor	3	0	1	0	4
5	(Republic of Ireland)	11	Jonny Hayes	3	0	0	1	4
8	(Scotland)	6	Mark Reynolds	2	0	0	1	3
8	(Scotland)	22	Ryan Jack	3	0	0	0	3
10	(Scotland)	3	Andrew Considine	2	0	0	0	2
10	(Scotland)	14	Cammy Smith	2	0	0	0	2
12	(Scotland)	18	Nicky Low	1	0	0	0	1
12	(Montserrat)	28	Donervon Daniels	0	0	1	0	1
			Own goal	3	1	0	0	4
			TOTALS	57	1	6	12	76

== Team statistics ==
=== League table ===
Pos	Team	Pld	W	D	L	GF	GA	GD	Pts	Qualification or relegation
1	Celtic (C)	38	29	5	4	84	17	+67	92	Qualification for the Champions League second qualifying round
2	Aberdeen	38	23	6	9	57	33	+24	75	Qualification for the Europa League first qualifying round
3	Inverness Caledonian Thistle	38	19	8	11	52	42	+10	65	Qualification for the Europa League second qualifying round (Note: Inverness Caledonian Thistle qualified for the second qualifying round of the UEFA Europa League by winning the 2014–15 Scottish Cup.)
4	St Johnstone	38	16	9	13	34	34	0	57	Qualification for the Europa League first qualifying round
5	Dundee United	38	17	5	16	58	56	+2	56	

Source: SPFL
Rules for classification: 1) points; 2) goal difference; 3) number of goals scored
(C) Champions

==== Results by round ====
Round	1	2	3	4	5	6	7	8	9	10	11	12	13	14	15	16	17	18	19	20	21	22	23	24	25	26	27	28	29	30	31	32	33	34	35	36	37	38
Ground	H	A	A	H	A	H	H	H	A	A	H	A	H	A	H	A	H	A	H	A	A	H	A	H	A	H	A	H	A	H	H	A	H	A	A	H	A	H
Result	L	W	L	W	L	W	W	D	W	L	W	W	L	W	W	W	W	W	W	W	W	D	D	W	W	W	L	W	D	D	W	W	W	W	L	L	D	L
Position	12	7	9	8	9	7	6	6	5	6	6	5	5	5	4	4	3	2	1	1	1	2	2	2	2	2	2	2	2	2	2	2	2	2	2	2	2	2

Updated to match(es) played on 24 May 2015. Source: BBC Sport
A = Away; H = Home; W = Win; D = Draw; L = Loss

=== Results summary ===
Overall								Home						Away					
Pld	W	D	L	GF	GA	GD	Pts	W	D	L	GF	GA	GD	W	D	L	GF	GA	GD
38	23	6	9	57	33	+24	75	12	3	4	32	15	+17	11	3	5	25	18	+7

Source: BBC Sport

=== Results by opponent ===
Aberdeen score first

Team	Results				Points
Team	1	2	3	4	Points
Celtic	1-2	1-2	0-4	0-1	0
Dundee	3-2	3-3	1-1	1-1	6
Dundee United	0-3	2-0	1-0	0-1	6
Hamilton Academical	0-3	3-0	3-0	X	6
Inverness C.T.	3-2	1-0	1-0	2-1	12
Kilmarnock	2-0	1-0	2-1	X	9
Motherwell	1-0	2-0	2-1	X	9
Partick Thistle	2-0	1-0	0-0	X	7
Ross County	3-0	1-0	4-0	X	9
St Johnstone	0-1	2-0	1-1	0-1	4
St Mirren	2-2	2-0	3-0	X	7

Source: 2014–15 Scottish Premier League Results Table

== Transfers ==
=== In ===
Date	Position	Nationality	Name	From	Fee
27 May 2014	DF	(England)	Shaleum Logan	(England) Brentford	Free
28 May 2014	GK	(England)	Scott Brown	(England) Cheltenham Town	Free
28 May 2014	DF	(Wales)	Ash Taylor	(England) Tranmere Rovers	Free
7 July 2014	FW	(Scotland)	David Goodwillie	(England) Blackburn Rovers	Free
2 February 2015	MF	(Scotland)	Kenny McLean	(Scotland) St Mirren	£275,000
11 March 2015	MF	(England)	Andrew Driver	Unattached	Free

=== Out ===
Date	Position	Nationality	Name	To	Fee
June 2014	GK	(England)	Nicky Weaver		Free
18 June 2014	FW	(England)	Scott Vernon	(England) Shrewsbury Town	Free
20 June 2014	FW	(Democratic Republic of the Congo)	Calvin Zola	(England) Stevenage	Free
16 July 2014	FW	(Northern Ireland)	Josh Magennis	(Scotland) Kilmarnock	Free

=== Loans in ===
Date	Position	Nationality	Name	From	Fee
22 July 2014	MF	(England)	Jeffrey Monakana	(England) Brighton & Hove Albion	Loan
27 January 2015	DF	(Montserrat)	Donervon Daniels	(England) West Brom	Loan

=== Loans out ===
Date	Position	Nationality	Name	To	Fee
1 August 2014	GK	(Republic of Ireland)	Danny Rogers	(Scotland) Dumbarton	Loan
8 August 2014	FW	(Scotland)	Declan McManus	(Scotland) Greenock Morton	Loan
14 January 2015	FW	(Scotland)	Craig Murray	(Scotland) Ayr United	Loan
30 January 2015	FW	(Scotland)	Craig Storie	(Scotland) Brechin City	Loan

== See also ==
- List of Aberdeen F.C. seasons
