= Adam Rooney =

Irish footballer (born 1988)

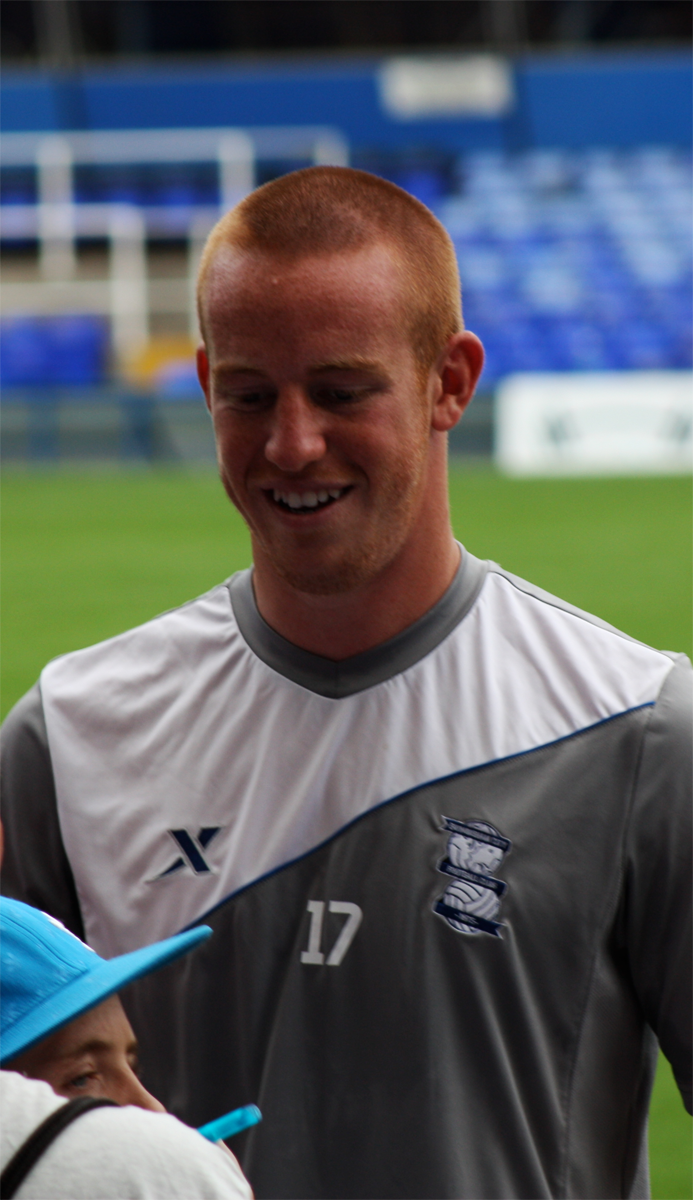
- Rooney with Birmingham City in August 2011

Personal information
- Full name: Adam Christopher David Rooney
- Date of birth: 21 April 1988 (age 38)
- Place of birth: Dublin, Ireland
- Height: 1.78 m (5 ft 10 in)
- Position: Striker

Team information
- Current team: King's Lynn Town (player-assistant coach)
- Number: 17

Youth career
- Home Farm
- Cherry Orchard
- Crumlin United
- 2005–2006: Stoke City

Senior career*
Years	Team	Apps	(Gls)
2006–2008	Stoke City	15	(4)
2007	→ Yeovil Town (loan)	3	(0)
2007–2008	→ Chesterfield (loan)	22	(6)
2008	→ Bury (loan)	16	(3)
2008–2011	Inverness Caledonian Thistle	103	(44)
2011–2013	Birmingham City	18	(4)
2012–2013	→ Swindon Town (loan)	29	(9)
2013–2014	Oldham Athletic	24	(4)
2014–2018	Aberdeen	151	(66)
2018–2020	Salford City	70	(29)
2020–2022	Solihull Moors	53	(13)
2022	Stratford Town	6	(2)
2022–2023	Brackley Town	33	(6)
2023–2026	Hereford	44	(2)
2026–	King's Lynn Town	5	(0)

International career
2007–2010	Republic of Ireland U21	9	(0)

Managerial career
- 2026: Hereford (interim)
- * Club domestic league appearances and goals as of 09:13, 7 April 2026 (UTC)

Adam Christopher David Rooney (born 21 April 1988) is an Irish semi-professional footballer who plays as a striker for National League North club King's Lynn Town where he also holds the role of assistant coach.

He previously played for Stoke City, spent spells on loan at Yeovil Town, Chesterfield and Bury, was a regular first-team member for Inverness Caledonian Thistle, and played for Birmingham City and had a loan spell at Swindon Town. He played for Oldham Athletic and spent four and a half seasons with Aberdeen before returning to England to sign for Salford City, with whom he gained promotion to the Football League. He returned to non-league football with Solihull Moors in 2020, and moved on to Stratford Town and then Brackley Town in 2022.

== Club career ==
=== Stoke City ===
Rooney signed for Stoke City in the summer of 2005, after spells with Home Farm, Cherry Orchard and Crumlin United. In his first season at Stoke, Rooney made his debut at academy and reserves levels, before making his first team debut as a second-half substitute against Tamworth in the FA Cup. Rooney scored his first goal for Stoke against Reading on 17 April 2006. In only his second full start for Stoke City, he scored a hat-trick against already relegated Brighton & Hove Albion in the final fixture of the 2005–06 season to become Stoke's youngest ever hat-trick scorer.

==== Loan moves ====
On 16 March 2007, Rooney joined Yeovil Town on loan for a month. The loan was later extended until the end of the season. However, he returned to Stoke on 9 May 2007, after making one start and two substitute appearances for Yeovil.

In August 2007, he joined League Two side Chesterfield on a four-month loan.

=== Inverness Caledonian Thistle ===
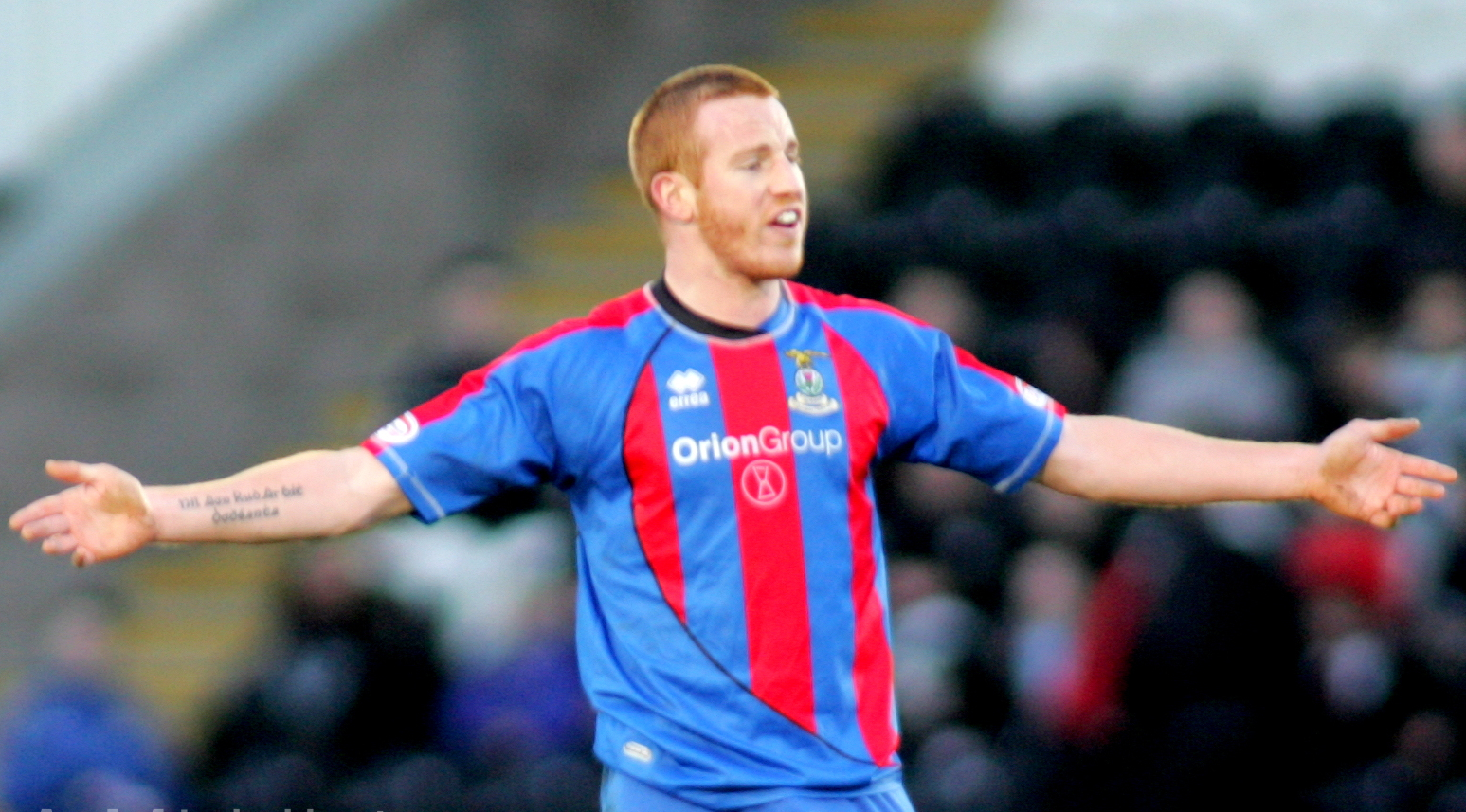
Rooney playing for Inverness Caledonian Thistle in 2011

Rooney travelled with Scottish Premier League club Inverness Caledonian Thistle's squad on their pre-season tour of Denmark and returned to train with the Highland side in August, before the club announced his signing on a three-year deal.

Rooney scored his first goal for Inverness in a 2–1 defeat at home to St Mirren, which was the SPL's 6,000th goal. In the 2009–10 season he was awarded the "Irn Bru Phenomenal" First Division Player of the Year award. He was top scorer in the First Division with 24 goals, 27 in all competitions, the last of which was scored against Dundee in the last fixture of the season. After the game the team were presented with the championship trophy.

=== Birmingham City ===
After his contract with Inverness expired at the end of the 2010–11 season, Rooney signed a two-year deal with Championship side Birmingham City. He scored what manager Chris Hughton described as "a typical poacher's goal" in a pre-season friendly against Cork City, and made his league debut for the club on the opening day of the new season, playing the whole of a 2–1 defeat at Derby County. His first competitive goal for the club came from the penalty spot to open the scoring away at Middlesbrough on 21 August; Middlesbrough came back to win 3–1. He also scored the following week against Watford. In the last game of the Europa League group stage, Rooney scored his first European goal as Birmingham beat NK Maribor 1–0, but a draw between the other two teams in the group meant Birmingham failed to progress to the last 32.

==== Swindon Town (loan) ====
On the last day of the August 2012 transfer window, Rooney joined League One club Swindon Town on loan for the season with a view to a permanent transfer. Swindon defender Paul Caddis moved in the other direction, also on loan for the season.

=== Oldham Athletic ===
Although a deal had been agreed for Rooney to join Swindon permanently at the end of the season, the club's new owners questioned the validity of the contract, and the player trained with League One club Oldham Athletic during 2013 pre-season while discussions continued to resolve the situation. On 1 August, he signed a two-year contract with Oldham, with an option of a further year. He scored his first goals for the club against Port Vale, scoring twice in a 3–1 win at Boundary Park.

=== Aberdeen ===
On 23 January 2014, Rooney signed a two-and-a-half-year contract with Scottish Premiership side Aberdeen. He scored on his debut two days later in a 2–2 draw with Motherwell at Fir Park, and scored his second in as many matches, as well as crossing for Jonny Hayes' opening goal, as Aberdeen beat St Johnstone 4–0 to progress to the 2014 Scottish League Cup Final. Rooney scored his fifth goal in six appearances on 25 February, to help his side end Celtic's 26-match unbeaten run in the Premiership season. On 8 March 2014, Rooney scored his sixth goal in eight appearances in a 1–0 Scottish Cup quarter-final win over Dumbarton.

Rooney started for Aberdeen against his former club Inverness in the 2014 Scottish League Cup Final. A 0–0 scoreline after 90 minutes led to extra time and penalties, where Rooney scored the decisive penalty kick in a 4–2 victory to win the League Cup; it was Aberdeen's first piece of silverware for 19 years. Rooney was voted Scottish Professional Football Player of the Month for February 2014.

Rooney started the 2014–2015 season strongly by scoring two goals in a 5–0 home victory against FK Daugava Riga in the first qualifying round of the Europa League. He continued his strong start with a first-half hat-trick in a 3–0 away win in the second leg. Rooney went on to give the Dons the lead in the second leg of the second qualifying round against FC Groningen, scoring a penalty as Aberdeen won 2–1, progressing to the third qualifying round to face Real Sociedad. This put his European goals total with Aberdeen to six in four games. Rooney scored his first league goal of the season in a 3–0 win against Ross County and continued his scoring exploits four days later with his second hat-trick for the Dons and tenth goal of the season in a 4–0 League Cup win against Livingston. Rooney then provided the only goal in a game against Hamilton Academical in the same competition to see the Dons through to the semi-finals. On 23 November, Rooney continued his good form and scored his 14th goal of the season by converting a penalty in a 1–0 victory away against Partick Thistle. On 22 December, Rooney signed a contract extension running until the summer of 2018. Rooney scored 28 goals in total for the season and finished the top scorer in the Scottish Premiership.

On 5 August 2016, Rooney signed a four-year contract extension at Aberdeen. He scored his 100th Scottish League goal on 31 March 2017, in a 7–0 victory over Dundee. On 22 April 2017, in the semi-final of the Scottish Cup, Rooney opened the scoring after just 12 seconds as Aberdeen won 3–2 against Hibernian.

=== Salford City ===
Rooney signed a three-year contract with Salford City of the National League on 19 July 2018; the fee was undisclosed. The transfer led to Accrington Stanley owner Andy Holt accusing Salford of "buying" a place in the English Football League, with Rooney reportedly due to earn £4,000 per week at Salford. He made his debut in the opening match of the 2018–19 season on 4 August, playing the whole match as Salford drew 1–1 at home to Leyton Orient.

=== Solihull Moors ===
Rooney joined National League club Solihull Moors on 13 March 2020 on a contract to run until the end of the 2021–22 season. The fee was undisclosed. Later that day, elite football in England was suspended because of the COVID-19 pandemic. The National League soon followed suit, and the season was declared complete, apart from the play-offs for which Solihull Moors had not qualified. Interviewed for The Times later in March, Rooney speculated that he might not make his debut for another six months. It was nearer seven: on 17 October, Rooney started Solihull Moors' match at home to Boreham Wood and, playing with ten men for most of the match after Darren Carter was sent off, he scored the only goal after 75 minutes.

Rooney's first goal of the 2021–22 season opened the scoring from the penalty spot in the FA Cup replay against Wigan Athletic, who went on to win 2–1 after extra time. Following defeat in the 2022 National League play-off final, Rooney was released in June 2022.

=== Later career ===
On 19 August 2022, Rooney signed for Stratford Town of the Southern League Premier Division Central. He scored five goals from nine appearances in all competitions before moving up a level, to Brackley Town of the National League North, in October.

On 16 June 2023, Rooney was appointed player-assistant manager under former Birmingham City team-mate Paul Caddis at National League North club Hereford. He made his debut in the opening league fixture of the season. He scored his first goal for Hereford on 21 October 2023, the third goal in a 3–1 win at home against Curzon Ashton.

== International career ==
Rooney played for the Republic of Ireland under-18 team in the 2005 European Youth Olympic Festival in Lignano Sabbiadoro; he scored twice as Ireland beat Switzerland to win the bronze medal. On 14 May 2007, Rooney scored a hat-trick in the Ireland under-19s' 3–0 win over Bulgaria in the elite qualifying phase of the 2007 European Under-19 Championships.

He was capped nine times for the under-21 team between 2007 and 2010.

He was called up to the senior Republic of Ireland squad in May 2015 for the first time when manager Martin O'Neill included him in a 33-man preliminary squad to face England in a friendly and Scotland in Euro 2016 qualifying.

== Managerial career ==
Rooney was appointed interim manager of Hereford on 11 February 2026, after manager Paul Caddis was relieved from his duties.

In March 2026, Rooney followed Caddis to King's Lynn Town as assistant coach with the ability to be selected as a player.

== Personal life ==
Rooney was born in Dublin. His older brother Mark was also a professional footballer.

In January 2022 Rooney co-launched Good Feel Coffee, an online coffee company supporting mental health and cancer charities.

== Career statistics ==
As of match played 6 April 2026

Appearances and goals by club, season and competition
Club	Season	League			National cup (Note: Includes FA Cup, Scottish Cup)		League cup (Note: Includes Football League Cup / EFL Cup, Scottish League Cup)		Other		Total	
Club	Season	Division	Apps	Goals	Apps	Goals	Apps	Goals	Apps	Goals	Apps	Goals
Stoke City	2005–06	Championship	5	4	2	0	0	0	—		7	4
Stoke City	2006–07	Championship	10	0	2	0	0	0	—		12	0
Stoke City	2007–08	Championship	0	0	—		0	0	—		0	0
Stoke City	Total		15	4	4	0	0	0	—		19	4
Yeovil Town (loan)	2006–07	League One	3	0	—		—		—		3	0
Chesterfield (loan)	2007–08	League Two	22	6	1	0	—		1 (Note: Appearance(s) in Football League Trophy)	0	24	6
Bury (loan)	2007–08	League Two	16	3	—		—		—		16	3
Inverness; Caledonian; Thistle	2008–09	Scottish Premier League	30	5	3	1	3	0	—		36	6
Inverness; Caledonian; Thistle	2009–10	Scottish First Division	35	24	2	0	2	2	3 (Note: Appearances in Scottish Challenge Cup)	0	42	26
Inverness; Caledonian; Thistle	2010–11	Scottish Premier League	38	15	3	4	1	2	—		42	21
Inverness; Caledonian; Thistle	Total		103	44	8	5	6	4	3	0	120	53
Birmingham City	2011–12	Championship	18	4	5	2	1	0	5 (Note: Appearances in UEFA Europa League)	1	29	7
Birmingham City	2012–13	Championship	0	0	—		1	0	—		1	0
Birmingham City	Total		18	4	5	2	2	0	5	1	30	7
Swindon Town (loan)	2012–13	League One	29	9	1	0	—		3 (Note: One appearance in Football League Trophy, two appearances and one goal in League One play-offs)	1	33	10
Oldham Athletic	2013–14	League One	24	4	5	2	1	0	3	1	33	7
Aberdeen	2013–14	Scottish Premiership	13	7	3	1	2	1	—		18	9
Aberdeen	2014–15	Scottish Premiership	37	18	1	0	3	4	6	6	47	28
Aberdeen	2015–16	Scottish Premiership	27	20	1	0	1	0	6	0	35	20
Aberdeen	2016–17	Scottish Premiership	38	12	5	3	4	2	6	3	53	20
Aberdeen	2017–18	Scottish Premiership	36	9	5	2	1	0	2	0	44	11
Aberdeen	Total		151	66	15	6	11	7	20	9	197	88
Salford City	2018–19	National League	38	21	3	2	—		3 (Note: Two appearances in FA Trophy, one in National League play-offs)	0	44	23
Salford City	2019–20	League Two	32	8	2	0	1	0	3 (Note: Appearances in EFL Trophy)	1	38	9
Salford City	Total		70	29	5	2	1	0	6	1	82	32
Solihull Moors	2020–21	National League	30	8	1	1	—		0	0	31	9
Solihull Moors	2021–22	National League	23	5	3	1	—		2 (Note: Appearances in FA Trophy)	0	28	6
Solihull Moors	Total		53	13	4	2	—		2	0	59	15
Stratford Town	2022–23	SL Premier Division Central	6	2	2	3	—		1	0	9	5
Brackley Town	2022–23	National League North	33	6	—		—		1 (Note: Appearance in National League North play-offs)	0	34	6
Hereford	2023–24	National League North	28	2	3	0	—		3	1	34	3
Hereford	2024–25	National League North	10	0	3	1	—		1	0	14	1
Hereford	2025–26	National League North	6	0	2	0	—		0	0	8	0
Hereford	Total		44	2	8	1	—		4	1	56	4
King's Lynn Town	2025–26	National League North	5	0	—		—		—		5	0
Career total			594	193	56	22	21	11	49	14	720	240

== Honours ==
Inverness Caledonian Thistle

- Scottish Football League First Division: 2009–10

Aberdeen

- Scottish League Cup: 2013–14

Republic of Ireland U18

- European Youth Olympic Festival: 2005 Bronze Medal
