= Domenico Doardo =

Italian footballer (born 1974)

Personal information
- Date of birth: 3 July 1974 (age 52)
- Place of birth: Verona, Italy
- Height: 1.93 m (6 ft 4 in)
- Position: Goalkeeper

Team information
- Current team: Foolad (goalkeeper coach)

Youth career
- 1990–1992: Vicenza
- 1992–1994: Torino

Senior career*
Years	Team	Apps	(Gls)
1990–1992	Vicenza	1	(0)
1992–1994	Torino	0	(0)
1994–1995	Ravenna	33	(0)
1995–1996	Torino	8	(0)
1996–1997	Cremonese	36	(0)
1997–2000	Genoa	44	(0)
2000–2002	Hellas Verona	7	(0)
2002–2003	Treviso	30	(0)
2003–2004	Hellas Verona	0	(0)
2004–2006	Novara	9	(0)
2006	Sangiovannese	0	(0)
2007	Benevento	0	(0)
2007–2008	Sorrento	0	(0)
2008	Benevento	0	(0)
Total		168	(0)

International career
1994–1995	Italy U21	7	(0)

Managerial career
- 2009: Benevento (academy goalkeeper coach)
- 2011–2013: Swindon Town (goalkeeper coach)
- 2013: Sunderland (goalkeeper coach)
- 2017-2018: Akhmat Grozny (goalkeeper coach)
- 2018-2019: Albissole (goalkeeper coach)
- 2018-2021: Damac (goalkeeper coach)
- 2022-2024: Udinese Calcio (goalkeeper coach)
- 2024-: Foolad (goalkeeper coach)
- * Club domestic league appearances and goals

Domenico Doardo (born 3 July 1974) is an Italian former professional footballer and current goalkeeper coach.

== Career ==
Doardo played professionally for several teams in his native Italy, including Torino and Hellas Verona, with whom he played in Serie A before dropping down the leagues during his later career.

During the mid-1990s and whilst under the management Cesare Maldini, Doardo represented Italy Under-21s on seven occasions.

== Coaching career ==
In May 2011 Doardo linked-up with fellow Italian, Paolo Di Canio, to act as goalkeeper coach for Swindon Town. First team goalkeeper Wes Foderingham has since paid tribute to Doardo after making significant progress since joining the club from Crystal Palace.

Doardo then followed Paolo di Canio to sunderland and became head goalkeeping coach
