= Craig Murray (footballer) =

Scottish footballer

Personal information
- Date of birth: 16 July 1994 (age 32)
- Position: Midfielder

Team information
- Current team: Rutherglen Glencairn

Youth career
- 2004–2012: Aberdeen

Senior career*
| Years | Team | Apps | (Gls) |
| 2012–2015 | Aberdeen | 5 | (0) |
| 2015 | → Ayr United (loan) | 14 | (0) |
| 2015–2016 | East Fife | 21 | (1) |
| 2016–2022 | Cumbernauld Colts | ? | (?) |
| 2022– | Rutherglen Glencairn | ? | (?) |
- * Club domestic league appearances and goals as of 11 March 2022

Craig Murray (born 16 July 1994) is a Scottish professional footballer, who plays for Rutherglen Glencairn. Murray, a midfielder, previously played for East Fife, Aberdeen, Ayr United, and Cumbernauld Colts.

== Career ==
Murray first joined Aberdeen at the age of 10. He made his debut for Aberdeen against St Johnstone on 22 December 2012, coming on as a late substitute.

On 14 January 2015, Murray signed for Ayr United on loan until the end of the 2014–15 season. After returning from his loan spell, Murray was released by Aberdeen.

On 10 July 2015, Murray signed for East Fife. In August 2016, Murray joined Cumbernauld Colts.

Rutherglen Glencairn announced the signing of Murray on 9 March 2022.

== Career statistics ==
As of 10 July 2015

| Club | Season | League | | FA Cup | | League Cup | | Other | | Total | |
| Club | Season | Apps | Goals | Apps | Goals | Apps | Goals | Apps | Goals | Apps | Goals |
|---|---|---|---|---|---|---|---|---|---|---|---|
| Aberdeen | 2012–13 | 1 | 0 | 0 | 0 | 0 | 0 | 0 | 0 | 1 | 0 |
| Aberdeen | 2013–14 | 2 | 0 | 0 | 0 | 2 | 0 | 0 | 0 | 4 | 0 |
| Aberdeen | 2014–15 | 2 | 0 | 0 | 0 | 0 | 0 | 0 | 0 | 2 | 0 |
| Aberdeen | Total | 5 | 0 | 0 | 0 | 2 | 0 | 0 | 0 | 7 | 0 |
| Ayr United (loan) | 2014–15 | 14 | 0 | 0 | 0 | 0 | 0 | 0 | 0 | 14 | 0 |
| East Fife | 2015–16 | 0 | 0 | 0 | 0 | 0 | 0 | 0 | 0 | 0 | 0 |
| Career total | | 19 | 0 | 0 | 0 | 2 | 0 | 0 | 0 | 21 | 0 |
