= Fabrizio Piccareta =

Italian UEFA Pro licensed coach (born 1965)

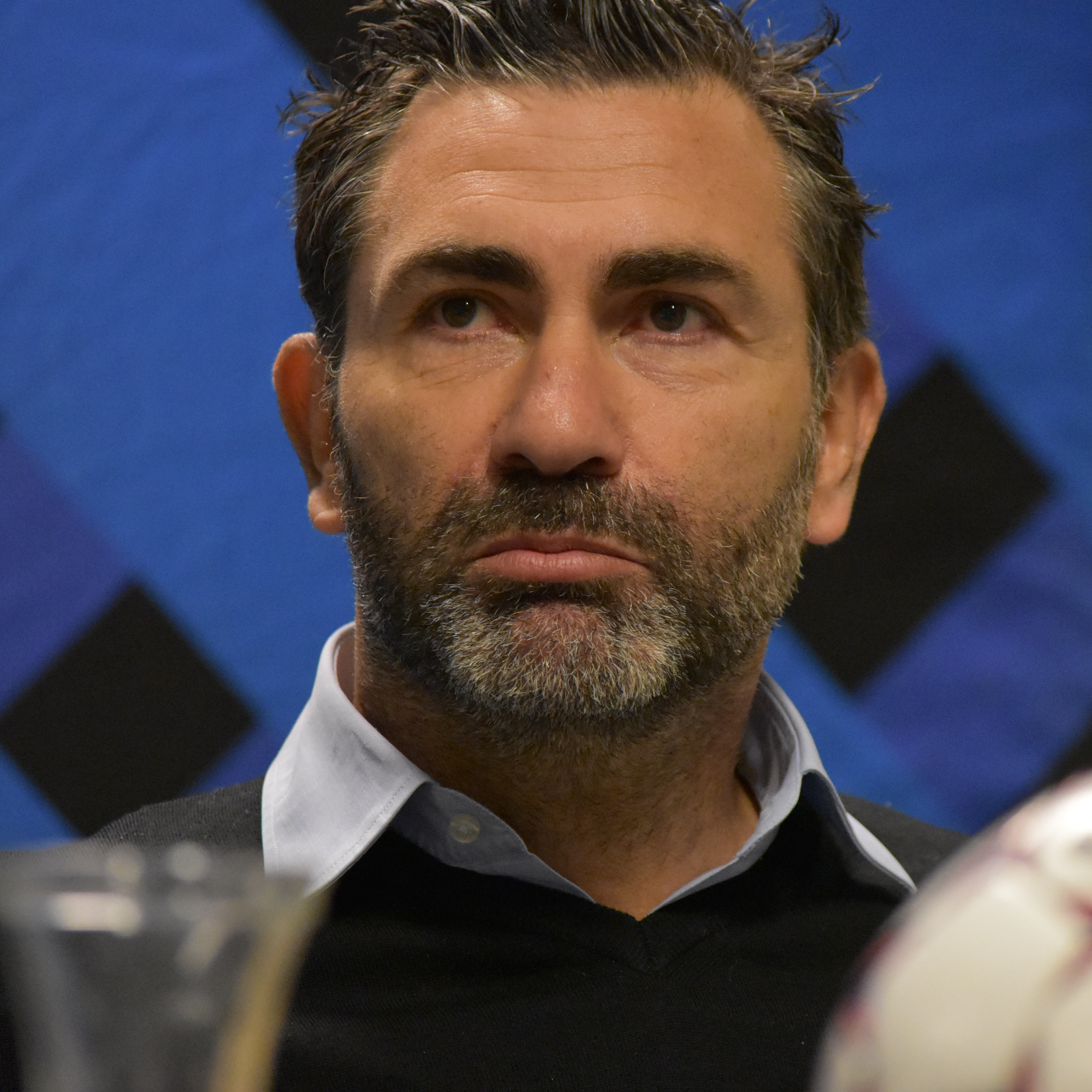

Personal information
- Date of birth: 15 November 1965 (age 60)
- Place of birth: Genova, Italy

Team information
- Current team: SPAL (U19)

Managerial career
- Years: Team
- 2004–2005: Sanremese
- 2005–2009: Inter Milan (Inter Campus Project)
- 2011–2013: Swindon Town (assistant)
- 2013: Swindon Town (caretaker)
- 2013: Sunderland (assistant)
- 2015: Olhanense (co-manager)
- 2015–2016: Sampdoria (academy)
- 2016–2017: FIGC (Scout)
- 2017: Inter Turku (assistant)
- 2017–2018: Inter Turku
- 2018–2021: Roma (U17)
- 2021–2022: SPAL (U19)
- 2023: Dinamo City (assistant)

Fabrizio Piccareta (born 15 November 1965) is an Italian football coach. He is the coach of the Under-19 (Primavera) squad of SPAL. Under the tenure of Paolo Di Canio, he served as both assistant manager, and later caretaker manager following Di Canio's resignation at Swindon Town.

== Coaching career ==
In 2001, Piccareta obtained his UEFA B Licence and went on to coach with Italian lower league outfit Sanremese.

Piccareta left Biancoazzurri in 2005 to take up a position with Serie A club Inter Milan. His role at Inter involved working within the Inter Campus Abroad project. It was a job that took him all over the world coaching in China, Cambodia, Iran, Colombia, Cuba and Slovakia among others. Between 2008 and 2011 Piccareta focused his time coaching fellow coaches and acting as a first team coach at Italian lower league clubs.

In May 2011, Piccareta was named assistant manager to Paolo Di Canio at English lower league club, Swindon Town. Piccareta spoke of sharing footballing philosophies with Di Canio setting out a plan to bring a "strong identity" to Swindon along with an "Italian methodology in training" and that their "kind of football won't be boring for the fans". During their first season in charge of Swindon, Di Canio and Piccareta managed to win the League Two championship and finish runners-up in the 2012 Football League Trophy played at Wembley Stadium.

On 18 February 2013, Paolo Di Canio announced his resignation from Swindon Town, leaving Piccareta in caretaker charge. He oversaw the club's 3–1 win away at promotion rivals Tranmere Rovers but after the game announced himself and the rest of the coaching staff would be leaving the club the following morning.

On 31 March 2013, after Paulo Di Canio was announced as the new head coach of Sunderland, it was confirmed that Piccareta would be following Di Canio to the Stadium of Light. On 31 May 2014 he obtained the UEFA A Licence from the Scottish Football Association course in Largs. In November 2014 he started his UEFA Pro Licence course with the Scottish FA.

On 7 February 2015, Piccareta join Portuguese Second Division club Olhanense in co-management with his fellow Italian Cristiano Bacci. After 3 months the duo saved the Club from the relegation leading them to the 18th place.

In July 2015 Piccareta signed a contract as academy coach of Sampdoria where he stayed one season before signing a contract with the Italian Football Federation as scout for the youth national teams. In August 2016 he signed a contract with the Italian Football Federation as part of the Youth National Teams scouting staff. In December 2016 he obtained the UEFA Pro Licence badge with the Scottish Football Association.

In January 2017 Piccareta signed a contract with the Finnish top flight club FC Inter Turku as assistant head coach.

On 4 August 2017, Piccareta was named as head coach of FC Inter Turku. He was the first Italian to work as head coach in this club. After having successfully completed his first season leading the team to safety in Veikkausliiga, his contract was renewed for another year. During the 2018 season, Piccareta led the club to the Finnish Cup title beating HJK on their home ground. This was the first title for FC Inter since 2009 and has given the club access to the UEFA Europa League qualifiers for the 2019 season.

Two weeks after the cup win, Piccareta gave his resignation to join Roma as their Under 17's head coach.

On 21 July 2021, he signed a two-year contract as the head coach of the Under-19 (Primavera) team of SPAL. In the early 2022, Piccareta received the "Manlio Scopigno Award" as the "Italian Best Youth Coach".

In April 2022 he accepted an offer for the head coach position of the Finnish club HIFK. However, eventually Piccareta was sidelined in the process and HIFK appointed Mixu Paatelainen as the new manager. Piccareta appealed to the FIFA's Court of Arbitration for Sport (CAS), and his complain succeeded, as in May 2023, HIFK was ordered to pay Piccareta €86,000 damages for the breach of contract. HIFK first announced that they will appeal on the decision, but later withdrew their appeal due to lack of money.

In July 2023, Piccareta followed Luigi Di Biagio to become his assistant at FC Dinamo Tirana in the Albanian top tier.

== Managerial statistics ==
As of 4 August 2017

Team	From	To	Record				
Team	From	To	G	W	D	L	Win %
Swindon Town (Caretaker)	18 February 2013	20 February 2013	1	1	0	0	100.00
FC Inter Turku	3 August 2017		1	1	0	0	100.00
Total			2	2	0	0	100.00
