= Russell McHenry =

Australian rules footballer

Personal information
- Full name: Russell McHenry
- Born: 21 April 1950 (age 76)
- Original team: Oakleigh
- Height: 170 cm (5 ft 7 in)
- Weight: 72 kg (159 lb)

Playing career^{1}
Years	Club	Games (Goals)
1971–72	South Melbourne	17 (14)
- ^{1} Playing statistics correct to the end of 1972.

Russell McHenry (born 21 April 1950) is a former Australian rules footballer who played with South Melbourne in the Victorian Football League (VFL).
