= Senator McHenry =

Senator McHenry may refer to:

- Henry D. McHenry (1826–1890), Kentucky State Senate
- William McHenry (1771–1835), Illinois State Senate
