= McKendrick =

McKendrick is a surname. Notable people with the surname include:

- Anderson Gray McKendrick (1878–1943), Scottish physician
- Archibald McKendrick (1876–1960), Scottish dentist and radiology pioneer
- Ewan McKendrick (born 1960), English lawyer
- Jamie McKendrick (born 1955), English poet
- John Gray McKendrick (1841–1926), Scottish physiologist
- John McKendrick (born 1969), Scottish football referee
- Melveena McKendrick (born 1941), Welsh scholar of the Spanish Golden Age
- Neil McKendrick (born 1935), British historian
- Robin McKendrick (born 1943), Australian politician
- Wilford M. McKendrick (1870–1936), American educator

== See also ==
- McKendrick, New Brunswick, an unincorporated community in Canada
