= 2007–08 Leyton Orient F.C. season =

Leyton Orient
- Manager: Martin Ling
- Stadium: Brisbane Road
- League One: 14th
- FA Cup: 1st round
- League Cup: 2nd round
- League Trophy: 2nd round

The 2007–08 Leyton Orient F.C. season was the 109th season in the history of Leyton Orient Football Club, their 92nd in the Football League, and second consecutive season in the third tier of the English football league system.

== Season summary ==
Having finished in 20th place, one spot above the relegation zone, most of the side that won the club promotion in 2006 left at the end of the season. Some players were released, some declined new contracts and the club's longest-serving player Matthew Lockwood was re-signed but later moved in pre-season to Nottingham Forest. The O's began the 2007–08 season in fine form, winning seven of their first nine games in all competitions. Orient were top of the table at the beginning of October and were in the top seven until after Christmas, though a loss of form in the second half of the season, recording only three wins from the last 12 games, meant the season ended in a respectable 14th-placed finish with 60 points.

== League table ==
Pos	Team	Pld	W	D	L	GF	GA	GD	Pts
12	Walsall	46	16	16	14	52	46	+6	64
13	Swindon Town	46	16	13	17	63	56	+7	61
14	Leyton Orient	46	16	12	18	49	63	−14	60
15	Hartlepool United	46	15	9	22	62	65	−3	54
16	Bristol Rovers	46	12	17	17	45	53	−8	53

Updated to match(es) played on 3 May 2008. Source: The Football League
Rules for classification: 1) points; 2) goal difference; 3) number of goals scored.

== Results ==
=== Football League One ===
11 August 2007 1	Southend United	1–2	Leyton Orient	Southend-on-sea
	Gower 24'; McCormack (red card) 58'		Thornton 38'; Boyd 86'	Stadium: Roots Hall; Attendance: 9,828

18 August 2007 2	Leyton Orient	1–0	Walsall	London
	Gray 52'			Stadium: Matchroom Stadium; Attendance: 4,524

25 August 2007 3	Crewe Alexandra	0–2	Leyton Orient	Crewe
			Melligan 35'; Boyd 85' (pen.)	Stadium: Gresty Road; Attendance: 4,683

1 September 2007 4	Leyton Orient	2–2	Northampton Town	London
	Chambers 52'; Mkandawire 57'		Hübertz 15'; Doig 19'	Stadium: Matchroom Stadium; Attendance: 5,170

8 September 2007 6	Leyton Orient	1–0	Bournemouth	London
	Boyd 71'			Stadium: Matchroom Stadium; Attendance: 4,995

15 September 2007 7	Yeovil Town	0–1	Leyton Orient	Yeovil
			Boyd 57'	Stadium: Huish Park; Attendance: 5,217

22 September 2007 8	Leyton Orient	2–4	Hartlepool United	London
	Melligan 57'; Daniels 87'		Thomas-Moore 10', 90'; Brown 51'; Monkhouse 84'	Stadium: Matchroom Stadium; Attendance: 5,325

29 September 2007 9	Bristol Rovers	2–3	Leyton Orient	Bristol
	Walker 41' (pen.), 54' (pen.)		Gray 59'; Mkandawire 77'; Demetriou 81'	Stadium: Memorial Stadium; Attendance: 7,181

2 October 2007 10	Gillingham	3–1	Leyton Orient	Gillingham
	Graham 25', 50'; Cogan 67'		Ibehre 72'	Stadium: Priestfield; Attendance: 5,632

6 October 2007 11	Leyton Orient	0–5	Swansea City	London
			Butler 4', 51'; Pratley 46'; Anderson 57'; Feeney 90'	Stadium: Matchroom Stadium; Attendance: 5,586

13 October 2007 12	Leeds United	1–1	Leyton Orient	Leeds
	Carole 55'		Thornton 9' (red card) 32'	Stadium: Elland Road; Attendance: 29,177

20 October 2007 13	Leyton Orient	3–1	Port Vale	London
	Mkandawire 53'; Ibehre 55'; Boyd 60' (pen.)		Rodgers 40'	Stadium: Matchroom Stadium; Attendance: 4,555

28 October 2007 14	Doncaster Rovers	4–2	Leyton Orient	Doncaster
	Wellens 52', 88'; Price 69'; Hayter 83'		Ibehre 56'; Purches 68'	Stadium: Keepmoat Stadium; Attendance: 7,184

3 November 2007 15	Leyton Orient	1–0	Oldham Athletic	London
	Daniels 8'			Stadium: Matchroom Stadium; Attendance: 4,690

6 November 2007 16	Swindon Town	1–1	Leyton Orient	Swindon
	Aljofree 90'		Boyd 87'	Stadium: County Ground; Attendance: 5,874

17 November 2007 17	Leyton Orient	2–2	Brighton & Hove Albion	London
	Gray 27'; Demetriou 70'		Forster 68'; Cox 75'	Stadium: Matchroom Stadium; Attendance: 6,496

24 November 2007 18	Huddersfield Town	0–1	Leyton Orient	Huddersfield
			Boyd 4'	Stadium: Galpharm Stadium; Attendance: 9,697

4 December 2007 19	Leyton Orient	0–1	Millwall	London
			Whitbread 9'	Stadium: Matchroom Stadium; Attendance: 6,220

8 December 2007 20	Leyton Orient	2–0	Cheltenham Town	London
	Boyd 41'; Melligan 76'		Whitbread 9'	Stadium: Matchroom Stadium; Attendance: 4,156

15 December 2007 20	Carlisle United	1–0	Leyton Orient	Carlisle
	Garner 50'			Stadium: Brunton Park; Attendance: 6,843

22 December 2007 21	Leyton Orient	0–0	Yeovil Town	London
				Stadium: Matchroom Stadium; Attendance: 4,687

26 December 2007 22	Bournemouth	3–1	Leyton Orient	Bournemouth
	Gradel 19'; Vokes 50'; Henry 89'		Saah 72'	Stadium: Fitness First Stadium; Attendance: 5,356

29 December 2007 23	Hartlepool United	1–1	Leyton Orient	Hartlepool
	Thomas-Moore 55'		Chambers 33'	Stadium: Victoria Park; Attendance: 4,379

1 January 2008 24	Leyton Orient	0–0	Gillingham	London
				Stadium: Matchroom Stadium; Attendance: 5,369

8 January 2008 25	Leyton Orient	3–0	Tranmere Rovers	London
	Gray 11'; Thornton 84'; Mkandawire 90'		Cansdell-Sherriff (red card) 50'	Stadium: Matchroom Stadium; Attendance: 3,447

12 January 2008 26	Nottingham Forest	4–0	Leyton Orient	Nottingham
	Holt 31', 54' (pen.); Commons 72'; Thornhill 89'			Stadium: City Ground; Attendance: 17,805

19 January 2008 27	Leyton Orient	2–1	Luton Town	London
	Boyd 39'; Barcham 55'		Keane 67'	Stadium: Matchroom Stadium; Attendance: 5,516

25 January 2008 28	Northampton Town	2–0	Leyton Orient	Northampton
	Coke 14'; Hübertz 78' (pen.)			Stadium: Sixfields; Attendance: 5,405

29 January 2008 29	Walsall	0–0	Leyton Orient	Walsall
				Stadium: Banks's Stadium; Attendance: 4,643

2 February 2008 30	Leyton Orient	2–2	Southend United	London
	Boyd 51' (pen.); Ibehre 90'		Barnard 27'; Clarke 56'	Stadium: Matchroom Stadium; Attendance: 6,886

9 February 2008 31	Tranmere Rovers	1–1	Leyton Orient	Birkenhead
	Zola 2'		Chambers 87'	Stadium: Prenton Park; Attendance: 6,530

12 February 2008 32	Leyton Orient	0–1	Crewe Alexandra	London
			Maynard 26'	Stadium: Matchroom Stadium; Attendance: 3,881

16 February 2008 33	Luton Town	0–1	Leyton Orient	Luton
			Ibehre 26'	Stadium: Kenilworth Road; Attendance: 6,412

23 February 2008 34	Leyton Orient	0–1	Nottingham Forest	London
			Agogo 61'	Stadium: Matchroom Stadium; Attendance: 7,136

1 March 2008 35	Brighton & Hove Albion	1–1	Leyton Orient	Brighton
	Forster 90' (pen.)		Ibehre 80'	Stadium: Withdean Stadium; Attendance: 6,242

8 March 2008 36	Leyton Orient	0–1	Huddersfield Town	London
			Beckett 75'	Stadium: Matchroom Stadium; Attendance: 4,660

11 March 2008 37	Leyton Orient	2–1	Swindon Town	London
	Boyd 51' (pen.), 55'		Thelwell 20' (o.g.)	Stadium: Matchroom Stadium; Attendance: 3,082

15 March 2008 38	Millwall	0–1	Leyton Orient	London
	Laird (red card) 58'		Gray 50'	Stadium: The Den; Attendance: 10,986

22 March 2008 39	Leyton Orient	0–3	Carlisle United	London
	Melligan (red card) 33'		Graham 17'; Raven 32'; Smith 49'	Stadium: Matchroom Stadium; Attendance: 6,134

24 March 2008 40	Cheltenham Town	1–0	Leyton Orient	Cheltenham
	Connor 47'			Stadium: Whaddon Road; Attendance: 3,988

29 March 2008 41	Port Vale	2–1	Leyton Orient	Stoke on Trent
	Richards 75'; Howland 90'		Boyd 26' (pen.)	Stadium: Vale Park; Attendance: 3,252

5 April 2008 42	Leyton Orient	0–2	Leeds United	London
			Huntington 16'; Beckford 50'	Stadium: Matchroom Stadium; Attendance: 7,602

12 April 2008 43	Oldham Athletic	2–0	Leyton Orient	Oldham
	Taylor 22'; Allott 42'		Boyd 26' (pen.)	Stadium: Boundary Park; Attendance: 4,325

19 April 2008 44	Leyton Orient	1–1	Doncaster Rovers	London
	Gray 44'		McCammon 60'	Stadium: Matchroom Stadium; Attendance: 4,582

26 April 2008 45	Swansea City	4–1	Leyton Orient	Swansea
	Anderson 18'; Bauzà 25', 35', 44'		Gray 63'	Stadium: Liberty Stadium; Attendance: 16,856

3 May 2008 46	Leyton Orient	3–1	Bristol Rovers	London
	Gray 12' (pen.); Boyd 81'; Ibehre 90'		Lambert 29'	Stadium: Matchroom Stadium; Attendance: 5,132

=== FA Cup ===
10 November 2007 Round 1	Leyton Orient	1–1	Bristol Rovers	London
	Gray 16'		Lambert 81'	Stadium: Matchroom Stadium; Attendance: 3,157

27 November 2007 Round 1 replay	Bristol Rovers	3–3 (a.e.t.) (6–5 p)	Leyton Orient	Bristol
	Hinton 2'; Lambert 90' (pen.); Disley 111'		Boyd 28', 92' (pen.); Corden (red card) 51'; Gray 55'; Ibehre (red card) 90'	Stadium: Memorial Stadium; Attendance: 3,742

=== League Cup ===
14 August 2007 Round 1	Queens Park Rangers	1–2	Leyton Orient	London
	Rowlands 68'		Demetriou 55'; Boyd 64' (pen.)	Stadium: Loftus Road; Attendance: 5,260

28 August 2007 Round 2	Cardiff City	1–0	Leyton Orient	Cardiff
	Whittingham 90'		Thornton (red card) 69'	Stadium: Ninian Park; Attendance: 6,150

=== Football League Trophy ===
3 September 2007 Southern Section Round 1	Notts County	0–1	Leyton Orient	Nottingham
			Echanomi 43'	Stadium: Meadow Lane; Attendance: 900

9 October 2007 Southern Section Round 2	Leyton Orient	0–1	Dagenham & Redbridge	London
			Strevens 74'	Stadium: Matchroom Stadium; Attendance: 2,397

== Squad ==
No.	Name	Nat	Position	Date of birth (Age)	Signed from	Note
Goalkeepers
1	Stuart Nelson	(England)	GK	17 September 1981	Brentford	
12	Glenn Morris	(England)	GK	20 December 1983	none	
Defenders
2	Stephen Purches	(England)	RB	14 January 1980	AFC Bournemouth	
3	Charlie Daniels	(England)	LB	7 September 1986	on loan from Tottenham Hotspur	
4	Alton Thelwell	(England)	CB	5 September 1980	Hull City	
5	Tamika Mkandawire	(Malawi)	CB	28 May 1983	Hereford United	
6	Brian Saah	(England)	CB	16 December 1986	none	
8	Adam Chambers	(England)	RB	20 November 1980	Kidderminster Harriers	
15	Sam Oji	(England)	CB	9 October 1985	Birmingham City	
19	Aiden Palmer	(England)	LB	2 January 1987	none	
20	Jason Demetriou	(Cyprus)	RB	18 November 1987	none	
23	Clayton Fortune	(England)	CB	10 November 1982	Bristol City	
25	Tom Kemp	(England)	CB	30 September 1989	none	
31	Alex Leam	(England)	CB	24 August 1990	none	
27	Chris Robson	(England)		1 July 1990	none	
Midfielders
7	John Melligan	(Republic of Ireland)	CM	11 February 1981	Cheltenham Town	
10	Sean Thornton	(Republic of Ireland)	CM	18 May 1983	Doncaster Rovers	
11	Wayne Corden	(England)	W	1 November 1975	Scunthorpe United	
17	Paul Terry	(England)	DM	3 April 1979	Yeovil Town	
24	Solomon Shields	(England)		14 October 1989	none	
26	Jack Page	(England)		16 December 1989	none	
29	Loick Pires	(Portugal)	W	20 November 1989	none	
Forwards
9	Wayne Gray	(England)	CF	7 November 1980	Yeovil Town	
14	Andy Barcham	(England)	CF	16 December 1986	on loan from Tottenham Hotspur	
16	Jabo Ibehre	(England)	CF	28 January 1983	none	
18	Adam Boyd	(England)	CF	25 May 1982	Luton Town	
21	Efe Echanomi	(Nigeria)	CF	27 September 1986	none	
22	Raphael Sylvester	(England)	CF	23 September 1988	none	
28	Bradley Gray	(England)	CF	5 July 1990	none	
