= 2008–09 Leyton Orient F.C. season =

Leyton Orient F.C.
2008–09 season
- Manager: Martin Ling (until 18 January); Geraint Williams (from 5 February)
- Football League One: 14th
- FA Cup: Third Round
- League Cup: First Round
- Football League Trophy: Southern Second Round

This article documents the 2008–09 season of Leyton Orient F.C.

== League table ==
Pos	Team	Pld	W	D	L	GF	GA	GD	Pts
12	Colchester United	46	18	9	19	58	58	0	63
13	Walsall	46	17	10	19	61	66	−5	61
14	Leyton Orient	46	15	11	20	45	57	−12	56
15	Swindon Town	46	12	17	17	68	71	−3	53
16	Brighton & Hove Albion	46	13	13	20	55	70	−15	52

Updated to match(es) played on 2 May 2009. Source: The Football League
Rules for classification: 1) points; 2) goal difference; 3) number of goals scored.

== Results ==
=== League One ===
9 August 2008 1	Leyton Orient	2–1	Hereford United	London
	Melligan 23'; Boyd 45' (pen.)		Beckwith 14'	Stadium: Matchroom Stadium; Attendance: 4,727

16 August 2008 2	Peterborough United	3–0	Leyton Orient	Peterborough
	Mackail-Smith 44', 69'; McLean 50'			Stadium: London Road; Attendance: 6,643

23 August 2008 3	Leyton Orient	0–0	Carlisle United	London
				Stadium: Matchroom Stadium; Attendance: 3,803

30 August 2008 4	Brighton & Hove Albion	0–0	Leyton Orient	Brighton
				Stadium: Withdean Stadium; Attendance: 6,675

6 September 2008 5	Walsall	0–2	Leyton Orient	Walsall
			Terry 73'; Boyd 80' (pen.)	Stadium: Banks's Stadium; Attendance: 4,838

13 September 2008 6	Leyton Orient	0–3	Stockport County	London
			Saah 13' (o.g.); McNulty 45'; Rowe 70'	Stadium: Matchroom Stadium; Attendance: 4,473

20 September 2008 7	Leyton Orient	1–3	Leicester City	London
	Chambers 44'		Dyer 11'; Fryatt 87'; King 90'	Stadium: Matchroom Stadium; Attendance: 6,448

26 September 2008 8	Southend United	3–0	Leyton Orient	Southend
	Barnard 1'; Sawyer 12'; Freedman 70'			Stadium: Roots Hall; Attendance: 9,261

4 October 2008 9	Leyton Orient	2–2	Scunthorpe United	London
	Boyd 59'; Purches 67'		Iriekpen 26'; Hayes 45'	Stadium: Matchroom Stadium; Attendance: 4,244

11 October 2008 10	Bristol Rovers	2–1	Leyton Orient	Bristol
	Coles 61'; Hinton 70'		Demetriou 46'	Stadium: Memorial Stadium; Attendance: 6,425

18 October 2008 11	Leyton Orient	0–1	Tranmere Rovers	London
			Shuker 39'	Stadium: Matchroom Stadium; Attendance: 5,568

21 October 2008 12	Leeds United	2–1	Leyton Orient	Leeds
	Purches 39' (o.g.); Becchio 45'		Morgan 36'	Stadium: Elland Road; Attendance: 18,990

25 October 2008 13	Yeovil Town	0–0	Leyton Orient	Yeovil
				Stadium: Huish Park; Attendance: 4,320

28 October 2008 14	Leyton Orient	1–2	Milton Keynes Dons	London
	Mkandawire 90'		Chadwick 19', 23'	Stadium: Matchroom Stadium; Attendance: 3,869

1 November 2008 15	Leyton Orient	1–0	Hartlepool United	London
	Boyd 81'			Stadium: Matchroom Stadium; Attendance: 3,638

15 November 2008 16	Crewe Alexandra	0–2	Leyton Orient	Crewe
			Mkandawire 55'; Boyd 74'	Stadium: Gresty Road; Attendance: 3,872

22 November 2008 17	Leyton Orient	0–0	Millwall	London
				Stadium: Matchroom Stadium; Attendance: 6,951

25 November 2008 18	Huddersfield Town	0–1	Leyton Orient	Huddersfield
			Boyd 2'	Stadium: Galpharm Stadium; Attendance: 10,414

6 December 2008 19	Northampton Town	1–1	Leyton Orient	Northampton
	Davis 2'		Melligan 42'	Stadium: Sixfields; Attendance: 5,039

13 December 2008 20	Leyton Orient	1–2	Cheltenham Town	London
	Boyd 33' (pen.)		Hayles 4'; Westlake 78'	Stadium: Matchroom Stadium; Attendance: 4,510

20 December 2008 21	Oldham Athletic	1–1	Leyton Orient	Oldham
	Liddell 34' (pen.)		Demetriou 72'	Stadium: Boundary Park; Attendance: 6,839

26 December 2008 22	Leyton Orient	1–2	Swindon Town	London
	Mkandawire 79'		Peacock 1'; Smith 61' (pen.)	Stadium: Matchroom Stadium; Attendance: 4,349

28 December 2008 23	Colchester United	1–0	Leyton Orient	Colchester
	Gillespie 39' (pen.)			Stadium: Weston Homes Community Stadium; Attendance: 6,290

10 January 2009 24	Leicester City	3–0	Leyton Orient	Leicester
	Oakley 9'; Davies 37'; Dickov 84' (pen.)			Stadium: Walkers Stadium; Attendance: 18,240

17 January 2009 25	Leyton Orient	1–2	Bristol Rovers	London
	Boyd 56'		Hughes 74'; Duffy 79'	Stadium: Matchroom Stadium; Attendance: 4,262

20 January 2009 26	Leyton Orient	1–1	Southend United	London
	Boyd 11'		Walker 90'	Stadium: Matchroom Stadium; Attendance: 3,835

24 January 2009 27	Scunthorpe United	2–1	Leyton Orient	Scunthorpe
	Hayes 44'; Thompson 64'		Morgan 58'	Stadium: Glanford Park; Attendance: 4,230

27 January 2009 28	Milton Keynes Dons	1–2	Leyton Orient	Milton Keynes
	Chadwick 19'		Morgan 23'; Purches 63'	Stadium: Stadium MK; Attendance: 8,170

31 January 2009 29	Leyton Orient	0–1	Yeovil Town	London
			Tomlin 90'	Stadium: Matchroom Stadium; Attendance: 4,597

7 February 2009 30	Tranmere Rovers	0–0	Leyton Orient	Birkenhead
				Stadium: Prenton Park; Attendance: 4,892

14 February 2009 31	Leyton Orient	1–0	Crewe Alexandra	London
	Purches 11'			Stadium: Matchroom Stadium; Attendance: 3,705

21 February 2009 32	Hartlepool United	0–1	Leyton Orient	Hartlepool
			Mkandawire 83'	Stadium: Victoria Park; Attendance: 3,678

28 February 2009 33	Hereford United	2–1	Leyton Orient	Hereford
	Brandy 6'; Guinan 16' (pen.)		Mkandawire 44'	Stadium: Edgar Street; Attendance: 3,286

3 March 2009 34	Leyton Orient	2–3	Peterborough United	London
	McGleish 42' (pen.), 56'		Whelpdale 6'; Torres 12'; Martin 45'	Stadium: Matchroom Stadium; Attendance: 3,381

7 March 2009 35	Leyton Orient	2–1	Brighton & Hove Albion	London
	McGleish 45' (pen.), 88'		Heath 17'	Stadium: Matchroom Stadium; Attendance: 5,885

10 March 2009 36	Carlisle United	1–3	Leyton Orient	Carlisle
	Dobie 78'		Daniels 29'; McGleish 35'; Church 50'	Stadium: Brunton Park; Attendance: 4,536

14 March 2009 37	Stockport County	0–1	Leyton Orient	Stockport
			Church 53'	Stadium: Edgeley Park; Attendance: 5,835

21 March 2009 38	Leyton Orient	0–1	Walsall	London
			Bradley 45'	Stadium: Matchroom Stadium; Attendance: 3,969

28 March 2009 39	Leyton Orient	2–1	Oldham Athletic	London
	McGleish 60' (pen.); Demetriou 84'		Whitaker 34'	Stadium: Matchroom Stadium; Attendance: 4,034

4 April 2009 40	Cheltenham Town	0–1	Leyton Orient	London
			Morgan 25'	Stadium: Whaddon Road; Attendance: 3,594

7 April 2009 41	Leyton Orient	2–2	Leeds United	London
	Thornton 65'; Church 85'		Snodgrass 9', 60' (pen.)	Stadium: Matchroom Stadium; Attendance: 6,943

11 April 2009 42	Leyton Orient	2–1	Colchester United	London
	Daniels 45'; Smith 80'		Platt 43'	Stadium: Matchroom Stadium; Attendance: 4,685

13 April 2009 43	Swindon Town	0–1	Leyton Orient	Swindon
			Demetriou 3'	Stadium: County Ground; Attendance: 7,735

18 April 2009 44	Leyton Orient	1–3	Northampton Town	London
	Crowe 24' (o.g.)		Akinfenwa 71'; Prijović 73'; Anya 90'	Stadium: Matchroom Stadium; Attendance: 4,665

25 April 2009 45	Millwall	2–1	Leyton Orient	London
	Alexander 70', 87'		Church 47'	Stadium: The Den; Attendance: 11,414

2 May 2009 46	Leyton Orient	1–1	Huddersfield Town	London
	Morgan 65'		Booth 24'	Stadium: Matchroom Stadium; Attendance: 5,371

=== FA Cup ===
8 November 2008 Round 1	Colchester United	0–1	Leyton Orient	Colchester
			Demetriou 80'	Stadium: Weston Homes Community Stadium; Attendance: 4,600

29 November 2008 Round 2	Bradford City	1–2	Leyton Orient	Bradford
	Boulding 58'		Demetriou 14'; Granville 65'	Stadium: Coral Windows Stadium; Attendance: 5,065

13 January 2009 Round 3	Leyton Orient	1–4	Sheffield United	London
	Melligan 38' (pen.)		Halford 59', 78'; Sharp 62'; Naughton 69'	Stadium: Matchroom Stadium; Attendance: 4,527

=== League Cup ===
12 August 2008 Round 1	Ipswich Town	4–1	Leyton Orient	Ipswich
	Haynes 20', 44'; Miller 22'; Lee 48'		Boyd 49'	Stadium: Portman Road; Attendance: 10,477

=== Football League Trophy ===
12 August 2008 Round 1	Southend United	2–4	Leyton Orient	Southend
	Sawyer 13', 34'		Jarvis 20'; Chambers 25'; Melligan 48'; Boyd 86'	Stadium: Roots Hall; Attendance: 3,499

12 August 2008 Round 2	Brighton & Hove Albion	2–2 (a.e.t.) (5–4 p)	Leyton Orient	Brighton
	Virgo 5' (pen.); Anyinsah 14'		Jarvis 21'; Boyd 72' (pen.)	Stadium: Withdean Stadium; Attendance: 2,157

== Players ==
=== First-team squad ===
Includes all players who were awarded squad numbers during the season.

Note: Flags indicate national team as defined under FIFA eligibility rules; some limited exceptions apply. Players may hold more than one non-FIFA nationality.

No.	Pos.	Nation	Player
1	GK	ENG	Glenn Morris
2	DF	ENG	Stephen Purches
3	DF	ENG	Danny Granville
4	DF	FRA	Alton Thelwell
5	DF	ENG	Tamika Mkandawire
6	DF	ENG	Brian Saah
7	MF	IRL	John Melligan
8	MF	ENG	Adam Chambers
9	FW	ENG	Wayne Gray
10	MF	IRL	Sean Thornton
11	FW	ENG	Dean Morgan (on loan from Luton Town)
12	GK	ENG	Jamie Jones
14	DF	ENG	Luke Ashworth
15	MF	ENG	Solomon Shields

No.	Pos.	Nation	Player
16	DF	SCO	Andrew Cave-Brown
17	MF	ENG	Paul Terry
18	FW	ENG	Adam Boyd
19	DF	ENG	Aiden Palmer
20	MF	CYP	Jason Demetriou
21	FW	POR	Loick Pires
22	FW	ENG	Bradley Gray
23	FW	ENG	Ryan Jarvis
24	MF	ENG	Harry Baker
25	MF	ENG	Charlie Daniels
26	FW	ENG	Adam Marsh
27	MF	ENG	Jimmy Smith (on loan from Chelsea)
28	MF	ENG	Jordan Spence (on loan from West Ham United)
29	FW	ENG	Scott McGleish (on loan from Wycombe Wanderers)
30	FW	WAL	Simon Church (on loan from Reading)

=== Left club during season ===
Note: Flags indicate national team as defined under FIFA eligibility rules; some limited exceptions apply. Players may hold more than one non-FIFA nationality.

No.	Pos.	Nation	Player
27	FW	ENG	Jack Jeffery (on loan from West Ham United)
25	DF	ENG	Luke Ashworth (on loan from Wigan Athletic)

No.	Pos.	Nation	Player
14	FW	ENG	Simon Dawkins (on loan from Tottenham Hotspur)
25	FW	SCO	Sam Parkin (on loan from Luton Town)
