= Charlie Daniels (footballer) =

English footballer (born 1986)

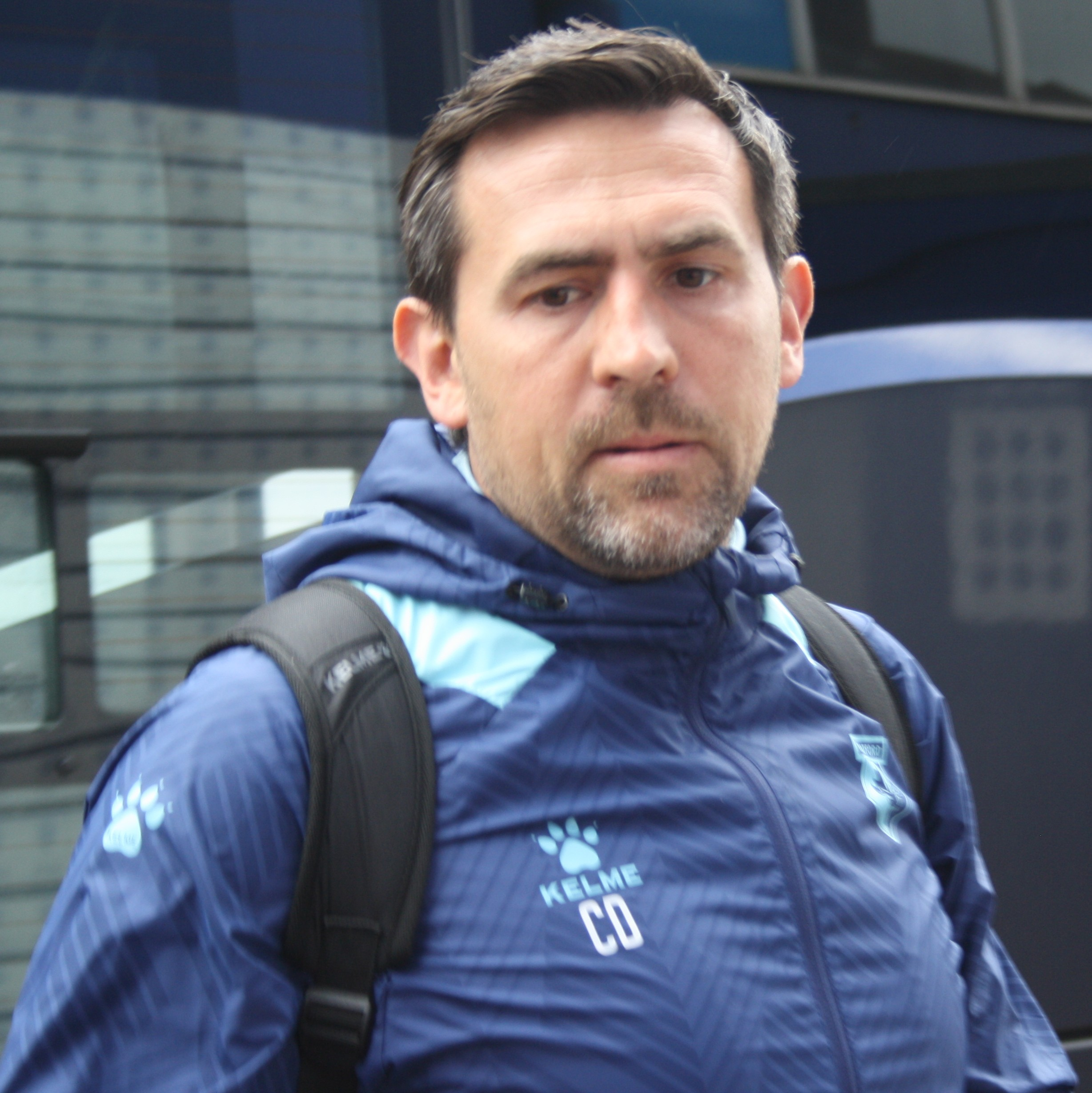
- Daniels in 2026

Personal information
- Full name: Charles John Daniels
- Date of birth: 7 September 1986 (age 40)
- Place of birth: Harlow, England
- Height: 5 ft 10 in (1.78 m)
- Position: Defender

Team information
- Current team: Watford (first-team coach)

Youth career
- Ridgeway Rovers
- Interwood
- Norwich City
- Tottenham Hotspur

Senior career*
| Years | Team | Apps | (Gls) |
| 2005–2009 | Tottenham Hotspur | 0 | (0) |
| 2007 | → Chesterfield (loan) | 2 | (0) |
| 2007–2008 | → Leyton Orient (loan) | 31 | (2) |
| 2008 | → Gillingham (loan) | 5 | (1) |
| 2009–2012 | Leyton Orient | 117 | (2) |
| 2011 | → AFC Bournemouth (loan) | 5 | (1) |
| 2012–2020 | AFC Bournemouth | 244 | (15) |
| 2020–2021 | Shrewsbury Town | 14 | (1) |
| 2021 | Portsmouth | 17 | (1) |
| 2021–2022 | Colchester United | 18 | (0) |
| 2024–2025 | Westfield | 0 | (0) |

Managerial career
- 2026: Watford (caretaker)
- * Club domestic league appearances and goals as of 13 June 2024

Charles John Daniels (born 7 September 1986) is an English professional football coach and former player who is currently a first-team coach for EFL Championship club Watford.

Starting his career at Tottenham Hotspur, he experienced a number of loans before joining Leyton Orient. In 2012, he was signed by AFC Bournemouth, where he experienced promotion from League One and the Championship, staying with the club for the duration of the first spell in the Premier League. He finished his career with spells at Shrewsbury Town, Portsmouth and Colchester United. He is under-21s coach at Watford.

== Career ==
=== Early career ===
Daniels was born in Harlow, Essex, and grew up in nearby Waltham Forest where he attended Highams Park School. He started his career playing for youth club Ridgeway Rovers and Interwood then moved onto Norwich City before joining Tottenham Hotspur's youth academy. He worked his way up through to the reserves, before earning his first professional contract in July 2005.

Daniels spent time on loan at Chesterfield during the 2006–07 season, but sustained an injury in only his second game, and returned to Tottenham.

In the summer of 2007, Leyton Orient boss, Martin Ling signed Daniels on loan for the entire League One season, after watching him regularly in the Tottenham reserves.

Following his last game at Orient, Daniels was sent back to Tottenham, where he had a year remaining on his contract. In August 2008, he joined Gillingham on a one-month loan. He made his debut for Gillingham in a 1–0 home win over Accrington Stanley and scored his only goal for the club with a free kick in a 3–0 home win over Grimsby Town. Daniels then returned to Spurs at the end of September and expressed an interest in trying to break into the first team.

Daniels returned to Orient in the January transfer window of 2009 on a free transfer.

=== AFC Bournemouth ===
In November 2011, Daniels joined AFC Bournemouth, initially on a loan deal as the signing was outside of the transfer window, but with the deal to become permanent in the January 2012 transfer window with the contract lasting for three years. On 8 August 2017, Daniels extended his contract with the club for a further three years. On 29 August 2019, Daniels was stretchered off in the 37th minute of Bournemouth's defeat to Manchester City with a dislocated right patella and ruled out for the rest of the season.

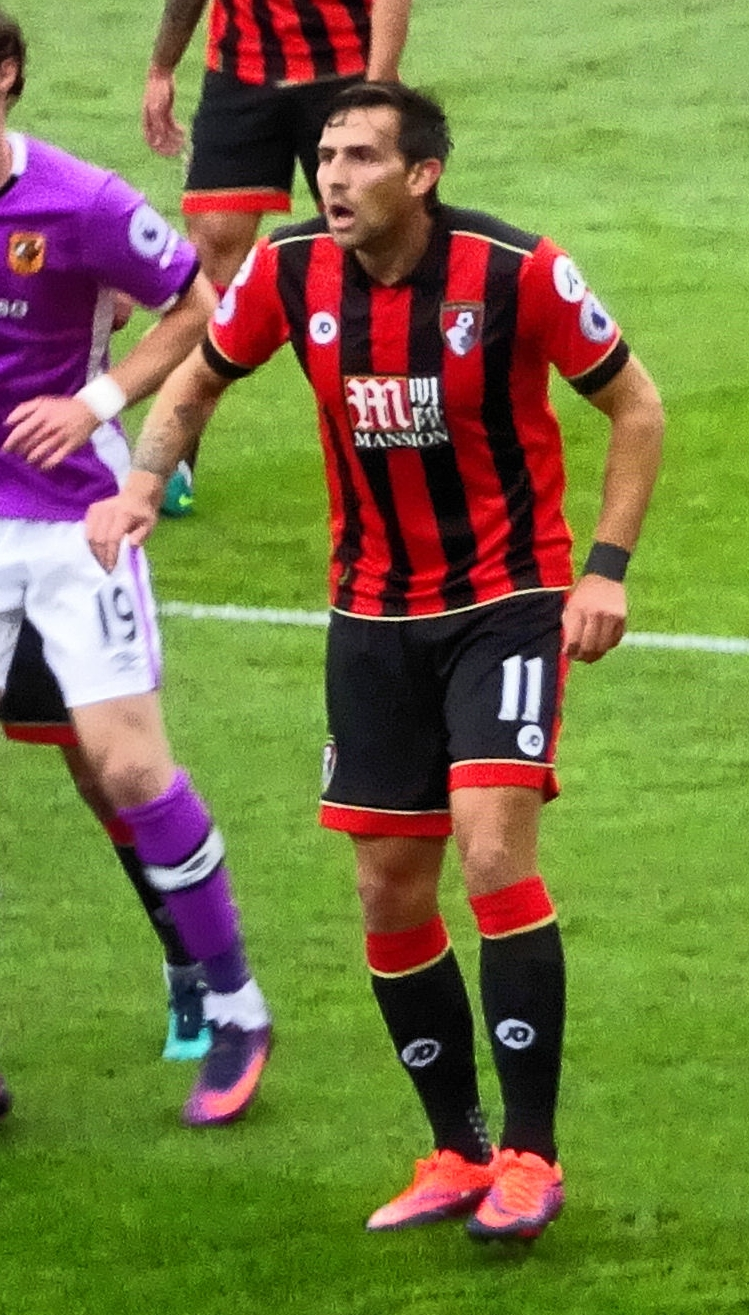
Daniels playing for AFC Bournemouth in 2016

=== Shrewsbury Town ===
On 23 October 2020, Daniels signed for League One side Shrewsbury Town on a short-term deal until January 2021. He scored his first goal for the club in an FA Cup tie against Cambridge United on 7 November 2020. His first league goal followed on 12 December, the only goal of a 1–0 win away at league leaders Hull City at the KCOM Stadium.

Daniels, alongside former Bournemouth teammate Marc Pugh, left the club on 19 January 2021 after his contract expired.

=== Portsmouth ===
On 23 January 2021, Daniels joined League One side Portsmouth on a deal until the end of the 2020–21 season. He scored his first goal for the club on 10 April 2021 in a 2–1 defeat to Burton Albion.

=== Colchester United and retirement ===
On 17 August 2021, Daniels signed for League Two side Colchester United on a one-year deal, having been on trial at the club. He made his debut the same day from the substitutes bench in Colchester's 1–1 draw with Mansfield Town. While at Colchester, Daniels began coaching with Watford's under-18 side in a part-time capacity. In January 2022, following the departure of Hayden Mullins as Colchester head coach, he made the decision to retire from playing and concentrate on his coaching role.

=== Westfield ===
In June 2024, Daniels joined Mid Sussex Football League club Westfield, owned by former Bournemouth teammate Steve Cook.

== Coaching career ==
On 1 February 2026, Daniels was announced as caretaker manager after the resignation of Javi Gracia. He will be supported by Dan Gosling and Adrian Mariappa.

== Career statistics ==
As of match played 11 January 2022

Appearances and goals by club, season and competition
| Club | Season | League | | | FA Cup | | League Cup | | Other | | Total | |
| Club | Season | Division | Apps | Goals | Apps | Goals | Apps | Goals | Apps | Goals | Apps | Goals |
|---|---|---|---|---|---|---|---|---|---|---|---|---|
| Tottenham Hotspur | 2006–07 | Premier League | 0 | 0 | 0 | 0 | 0 | 0 | 0 | 0 | 0 | 0 |
| Tottenham Hotspur | 2007–08 | Premier League | 0 | 0 | — | | — | | 0 | 0 | 0 | 0 |
| Tottenham Hotspur | 2008–09 | Premier League | 0 | 0 | 0 | 0 | 0 | 0 | 0 | 0 | 0 | 0 |
| Tottenham Hotspur | Total | | 0 | 0 | 0 | 0 | 0 | 0 | 0 | 0 | 0 | 0 |
| Chesterfield (loan) | 2006–07 | League One | 2 | 0 | — | | — | | — | | 2 | 0 |
| Leyton Orient (loan) | 2007–08 | League One | 31 | 2 | 2 | 0 | 2 | 0 | 2 (Note: Appearance(s) in Football League Trophy) | 0 | 37 | 2 |
| Gillingham (loan) | 2008–09 | League One | 5 | 1 | — | | — | | — | | 5 | 1 |
| Leyton Orient | 2008–09 | League One | 21 | 2 | — | | — | | — | | 21 | 2 |
| Leyton Orient | 2009–10 | League One | 41 | 0 | 2 | 0 | 2 | 0 | 2 | 0 | 47 | 0 |
| Leyton Orient | 2010–11 | League One | 42 | 0 | 8 | 0 | 1 | 0 | 1 | 0 | 52 | 0 |
| Leyton Orient | 2011–12 | League One | 13 | 0 | 1 | 0 | 3 | 0 | 1 | 0 | 18 | 0 |
| Leyton Orient | Total | | 117 | 2 | 11 | 0 | 6 | 0 | 4 | 0 | 138 | 2 |
| AFC Bournemouth (loan) | 2011–12 | League One | 5 | 1 | — | | — | | — | | 5 | 1 |
| AFC Bournemouth | 2011–12 | League One | 16 | 1 | — | | — | | — | | 16 | 1 |
| AFC Bournemouth | 2012–13 | League One | 34 | 4 | 4 | 0 | 1 | 0 | 0 | 0 | 39 | 4 |
| AFC Bournemouth | 2013–14 | Championship | 23 | 0 | 2 | 0 | 1 | 0 | — | | 26 | 0 |
| AFC Bournemouth | 2014–15 | Championship | 42 | 1 | 0 | 0 | 1 | 1 | — | | 43 | 2 |
| AFC Bournemouth | 2015–16 | Premier League | 37 | 3 | 1 | 0 | 1 | 0 | — | | 39 | 3 |
| AFC Bournemouth | 2016–17 | Premier League | 34 | 4 | 0 | 0 | 0 | 0 | — | | 34 | 4 |
| AFC Bournemouth | 2017–18 | Premier League | 35 | 1 | 1 | 0 | 1 | 0 | — | | 37 | 1 |
| AFC Bournemouth | 2018–19 | Premier League | 21 | 1 | 1 | 0 | 2 | 0 | — | | 24 | 1 |
| AFC Bournemouth | 2019–20 | Premier League | 2 | 0 | 0 | 0 | 0 | 0 | — | | 2 | 0 |
| AFC Bournemouth | Total | | 249 | 16 | 9 | 0 | 7 | 1 | 0 | 0 | 265 | 17 |
| Shrewsbury Town | 2020–21 | League One | 14 | 1 | 2 | 1 | 0 | 0 | 0 | 0 | 16 | 2 |
| Portsmouth | 2020–21 | League One | 17 | 1 | 0 | 0 | 0 | 0 | 1 (Note: Appearance(s) in EFL Trophy) | 0 | 18 | 1 |
| Colchester United | 2021–22 | League Two | 18 | 0 | 0 | 0 | 0 | 0 | 1 | 0 | 19 | 0 |
| Career total | | | 453 | 23 | 24 | 1 | 15 | 1 | 8 | 0 | 500 | 25 |

== Honours ==
Bournemouth

- Football League Championship: 2014–15
- Football League One second-place promotion: 2012–13

Portsmouth

- EFL Trophy runner-up: 2019–20

Individual

- PFA Team of the Year: 2012–13 League One
- Premier League Goal of the Month: August 2017
