= 2016–17 Southend United F.C. season =

Southend United
2016–17 season
- Chairman: Ron Martin
- Manager: Phil Brown
- Stadium: Roots Hall
- League One: 7th
- FA Cup: First round (vs. Millwall)
- League Cup: First round (vs. Gillingham)
- Football League Trophy: Second round (vs. Oxford United
- Top goalscorer: Simon Cox (16)

The 2016–17 season was Southend United's 111th year in existence and their second consecutive season in League One. Along with competing in League One, the club participated in the FA Cup, League Cup and Football League Trophy.

The season covers the period from 1 July 2016 to 30 June 2017.

== Transfers ==
=== Transfers in ===
Date from	Position	Nationality	Name	From	Fee	Ref.
1 July 2016	RB	(Cyprus)	Jason Demetriou	Walsall	Free transfer	
1 July 2016	RM	(England)	Jermaine McGlashan	Gillingham	Free transfer	
12 July 2016	GK	(England)	Mark Oxley	Hibernian	Free transfer	
16 July 2016	CF	(Republic of Ireland)	Simon Cox	Reading	Free transfer	
29 July 2016	CB	(Czech Republic)	Jakub Sokolík	Yeovil Town	Free transfer	
3 August 2016	CF	(England)	Nile Ranger	Free agent	Free transfer	
27 August 2016	CB	(England)	Anton Ferdinand	Reading	Free transfer	
29 September 2016	CF	(French Guiana)	Marc-Antoine Fortuné	Coventry City	Free transfer	
20 December 2016	RW	(England)	Zavon Hines	Dagenham & Redbridge	Free transfer	
18 January 2017	CF	(England)	Frank Nouble	Gillingham	Free transfer	
31 January 2017	CF	(Jamaica)	Theo Robinson	Lincoln City	Undisclosed	

=== Transfers out ===
Date from	Position	Nationality	Name	To	Fee	Ref.
1 July 2016	GK	(England)	Dan Bentley	Brentford	Compensation	
1 July 2016	CB	(Republic of Ireland)	Cian Bolger	Fleetwood Town (Note: Following Bolger's release, he signed for Fleetwood Town.)	Released	
1 July 2016	CM	(Republic of Ireland)	Gary Deegan	Shrewsbury Town (Note: Following his departure, Deegan signed for Shrewsbury Town.)	Mutual consent	
1 July 2016	CF	(Republic of Ireland)	Noel Hunt	Portsmouth (Note: Following Hunt's release, he signed for Portsmouth.)	Released	
1 July 2016	RW	(England)	Kevan Hurst	Mansfield Town (Note: Following Hurst's release, he signed for Mansfield Town.)	Released	
1 July 2016	CF	(Jamaica)	Jamar Loza	Free agent	Released	
1 July 2016	CM	(England)	Jack Payne	Huddersfield Town	Compensation	
1 July 2016	CB	(England)	Luke Prosser	Colchester United (Note: Following Prosser's release, he signed for Colchester United.)	Released	
1 July 2016	LW	(Antigua and Barbuda)	Myles Weston	Wycombe Wanderers (Note: Following Weston's release, he signed for Wycombe Wanderers.)	Released	
1 July 2016	RM	(England)	David Worrall	Millwall	Free transfer	
11 July 2016	AM	(Belgium)	Franck Moussa	Walsall	Free transfer	
4 January 2017	CB	(Czech Republic)	Jakub Sokolík	Plymouth Argyle	Free transfer	

=== Loans in ===
Date from	Position	Nationality	Name	From	Until	Ref.
5 August 2016	CM	(Scotland)	Adam King	Swansea City	End of Season	
31 August 2016	CB	(England)	Ryan Inniss	Crystal Palace	End of Season	
27 January 2017	DM	(England)	Luke Amos	Tottenham Hotspur	End of Season	

=== Loans out ===
Date from	Position	Nationality	Name	To	Until	Ref.
5 January 2017	CF	(England)	Jason Williams	Boreham Wood	8 April 2017	

== Competitions ==
=== Pre-season friendlies ===
Win Draw Loss

9 July 2016	Great Wakering Rovers	0–7	Southend United	Great Wakering
13:00		Report	Mooney 10'; Leonard 12', 30'; Trialist 72', 83'; Batlokwa 87'; Cotton 90'	Stadium: Burroughs Park

12 July 2016	Canvey Island	1–2	Southend United	Canvey Island
19:45	Halle 38'	Report	O'Neill 8'; Trialist 12'	Stadium: The Frost Financial Stadium

26 July 2016	Southend United	0–2	Newcastle United	Southend-on-Sea
19:45		Report	Anita 48'; Gouffran 78'	Stadium: Roots Hall

=== League One ===
==== League table ====
Pos	Team	Pld	W	D	L	GF	GA	GD	Pts	Promotion, qualification or relegation
5	Bradford City	46	20	19	7	62	43	+19	79	Qualification for the League One play-offs (Note: Four teams play for one spot and promotion to the EFL Championship.)
6	Millwall (O, P)	46	20	13	13	66	57	+9	73	Qualification for the League One play-offs
7	Southend United	46	20	12	14	70	53	+17	72	
8	Oxford United	46	20	9	17	65	52	+13	69	
9	Rochdale	46	19	12	15	71	62	+9	69	

Source: BBC Sport
Rules for classification: 1) Points; 2) Goal difference; 3) Number of goals scored
(O) Play-off winners; (P) Promoted

==== Matches ====
6 August 2016 1	Southend United	1–3	Gillingham	Southend-on-Sea
15:00 BST	McLaughlin 23'	Report	Emmanuel-Thomas 38'; Ehmer 47'; Wright (yellow card) 61'; Nelson (yellow card) 77'; Osadebe 79'	Stadium: Roots Hall; Attendance: 8,141; Referee: Dean Whitestone

13 August 2016 2	Port Vale	2–0	Southend United	Burslem
15:00 BST	Forrester 40'; Thomas (yellow card) 51'; Streete 75'	Report	Mooney (yellow card) 26'; Sokolík (yellow card) 60'; Demetriou (yellow card) 79'	Stadium: Vale Park; Attendance: 4,727 (245); Referee: Lee Probert

16 August 2016 3	Sheffield United	0–3	Southend United	Sheffield
19:45 BST	Sharp (yellow card) 59'	Report	O'Connell 5' (o.g.); McLaughlin 13'; Cox 15'; Thompson (yellow card) 40'; Coker (yellow card) 59'	Stadium: Bramall Lane; Attendance: 17,410 (269 Blues Fans); Referee: Geoff Eltringham

20 August 2016 4	Southend United	1–1	Bristol Rovers	Southend-on-Sea
15:00 BST	McLaughlin (yellow card) 56'; King (yellow card) 75'; Cox 81' (pen.) (yellow card) 82'	Report	Clarke (yellow card) 48'; Hartley 61' (yellow card) 85'	Stadium: Roots Hall; Attendance: 6,084; Referee: Gavin Ward

27 August 2016 5	Southend United	0–2	Fleetwood Town	Southend-on-Sea
15:00 BST	Barrett (yellow card) 36'; Demetriou (yellow card) 84'; O'Neill (yellow card) 90+6'	Report	Long 18'; Bell (yellow card) 45'; Jónsson (yellow card) 70'; Hunter 77'	Stadium: Roots Hall; Attendance: 5,507 (86 away); Referee: Oliie Yates

3 September 2016 6	Bolton Wanderers	1–1	Southend United	Bolton
15:00 BST	Spearing (yellow card) 34'; Anderson 48'	Report	Kyprianou 3'; Smith (yellow card) 90+3'; Leonard (yellow card) 90+4'	Stadium: Macron Stadium; Attendance: 13,519 (653 Away); Referee: Seb Stockbridge

10 September 2016 7	Scunthorpe United	4–0	Southend United	Scunthorpe
15:00 BST	Bishop (yellow card) 34'; Madden 36' van Veen 41'; Morris 57'; Mirfin (yellow card) 85'; Smallwood 87'	Report	Leonard (yellow card) 20'; Atkinson (yellow card) 38'; Sokolík (yellow card) 43'	Stadium: Glanford Park; Attendance: 3,723; Referee: John Brooks

17 September 2016 8	Southend United	3–1	Millwall	Southend-on-Sea
15:00 BST	Mooney 6'; McLaughlin 50'; McGlashan (yellow card) 79'; O'Neill 87'	Report	Martin (yellow card) 24'; O'Brien 33'; Thompson (yellow card) 84'; Webster (yellow card) 86'	Stadium: Roots Hall Stadium; Attendance: 7,752; Referee: Graham Salisbury

24 September 2016 9	Northampton Town	4–0	Southend United	Northampton
15:00 BST	O'Toole 46'; Revell 51' (pen.); Taylor 59'; Anderson 78'	Report	McLaughlin (yellow card) 43'; Demetriou (red card) 50'; White (yellow card) 70'	Stadium: Sixfields Stadium; Attendance: 6,138; Referee: Ross Joyce

27 September 2016 10	Southend United	2–1	Oxford United	Southend-on-Sea
19:45 BST	Leonard 13'; Wordsworth (yellow card) 40' (goal) 74' (pen.); Mooney (yellow card) 61'; O'Neill (yellow card) 87'; Inniss (yellow card) 90+3'; Oxley (yellow card) 90+6'	Report	Lundstram (yellow card) 44'; Hemmings 45+4'; Maguire (yellow card) 60'; Raglan (yellow card) 84'	Stadium: Roots Hall Stadium; Attendance: 5,593; Referee: Graham Horwood

1 October 2016 11	Southend United	1–1	Peterborough United	Southend-on-Sea
15:00 BST	Inniss (yellow card) 29'; Wordsworth (yellow card) 61' (penalty missed) 78' (pen.)	Report	Hughes (yellow card) 25'; Forrester (yellow card) 72'; Maddison 90+2'	Stadium: Roots Hall Stadium; Attendance: 6,417; Referee: Brendan Malone

8 October 2016 12	Rochdale	3–0	Southend United	Rochdale
15:00 BST	Canavan 18'; Andrew 27'; Mendez-Laing 83'	Report	Inniss (yellow card) 60'; O'Neill (yellow card) 75'	Stadium: Crown Oil Arena; Attendance: 2,600; Referee: Darren England

15 October 2016 13	Southend United	1–0	Chesterfield	Southend-on-Sea
15:00 BST	Coker (yellow card) 14'; Thompson 29'; Wordsworth (yellow card) 77'; Leonard (yellow card) 90+2'	Report	Anderson (yellow card) 73'	Stadium: Roots Hall Stadium; Attendance: 6,004; Referee: Kevin Johnson

18 October 2016 14	Bradford City	1–1	Southend United	Bradford
19:45 BST	McNulty 36'; Cullen (yellow card) 68'; Knight-Percival (yellow card) 87'	Report	Wordsworth 54' (yellow card) 85'	Stadium: Coral Windows Stadium; Attendance: 16,112; Referee: Trevor Kettle

22 October 2016 15	Milton Keynes Dons	0–3	Southend United	Milton Keynes
15:00 BST	Potter (yellow card) 59'; Colclough (yellow card) 90'; Martin (yellow card) 90'	Report	Cox 2'; Wordsworth 24', 90+1'; Coker (yellow card) 45+1'	Stadium: Stadium mk Attendance: 11,039; Referee: Charles Breakspear

29 October 2016 16	Southend United	1–1	Shrewsbury Town	Southend-on-Sea
15:00 BST	Ferdinand (yellow card) 24'; McLaughlin 39'; Thompson (yellow card) 71'; Cox (yellow card) 89'	Report	Adam El-Abd 26'; Deegan (yellow card) 42'; Black (yellow card) 43'; Toney (yellow card) 89'; Leutwiler (yellow card) 90+2'	Stadium: Roots Hall Stadium; Attendance: 7,321; Referee: Christopher Sarginson

12 November 2016 17	Bury	1–4	Southend United	Bury
15:00 GMT	Vaughan 20' (pen.); Soares (yellow card) 64'; Barnett (yellow card) 89'	Report	Ranger 9', 61'; Cox 12'; Ferdinand (yellow card) 20'; McLaughlin (yellow card) 64' (goal) 76'	Stadium: Gigg Lane; Attendance: 3,033; Referee: Richard Clark

19 November 2016 18	Southend United	3–0	Bradford City	Southend-on-Sea
15:00 GMT	Atkinson 14', 72'; Vincelot 86' (o.g.)	Report		Stadium: Roots Hall Stadium; Attendance: 7,005; Referee: Andy Woolmer

22 November 2016 19	Southend United	1–1	Swindon Town	Southend-on-Sea
19:45 GMT	Atkinson 12'; Demetriou (yellow card) 22'	Report	Thomas (yellow card) 45+1'; Obika 73'; Raphael Branco (yellow card) 82'	Stadium: Roots Hall Stadium; Attendance: 5,715; Referee: Darren Deadman

26 November 2016 20	Walsall	0–0	Southend United	Walsall
15:00 GMT	Chambers (yellow card) 24'; Laird (yellow card) 90+5'	Report	Timlin (yellow card) 15'; Cox (yellow card) 45'; Ferdinand (yellow card) 90+5'	Stadium: The Banks's Stadium; Attendance: 4,342; Referee: Carl Boyeson

10 December 2016 21	Southend United	3–1	Coventry City	Southend-on-Sea
15:00 GMT	Wordsworth 6'; Ferdinand 64'; McLaughlin 69'	Report	McCann (yellow card) 12'; Willis (yellow card) 60'; Kelly-Evans (yellow card) 64'; Agyei 89'	Stadium: Roots Hall Stadium; Attendance: 6,430; Referee: Dean Whitestone

17 December 2016 22	Oldham Athletic	0–2	Southend United	Oldham
15:00 GMT	Croft (yellow card) 50'; Winchester (yellow card) 86'; Clarke (yellow card) 90+1'	Report	Ranger 18'; McGlashan 76'	Stadium: Boundary Park; Attendance: 3,414; Referee: Christopher Sarginson

26 December 2016 23	Southend United	3–0	AFC Wimbledon	Southend-on-Sea
13:00 GMT	Cox 10', 84'; Atkinson 41'; Ferdinand (yellow card) 55'; Fortuné (yellow card) 85'; Leonard (yellow card) 90+1'	Report	Taylor (yellow card) 49' (yellow-red card) 72'	Stadium: Roots Hall Stadium; Attendance: 8,493; Referee: Lee Collins

31 December 2016 24	Southend United	1–1	Charlton Athletic	Southend-on-Sea
13:00 GMT	Cox 24' (yellow card) 66'	Report	Bauer (yellow card) 48'; Fox (yellow card) 71'; Crofts 89'; Umerah (yellow card) 90'	Stadium: Roots Hall Stadium; Attendance: 10,329; Referee: Mark Heywood

2 January 2017 25	Swindon Town	0–0	Southend United	Swindon
15:00 GMT	Rodgers (yellow card) 32'; Branco (yellow card) 60'	Report	Thompson (yellow card) 27'; Demetriou (yellow card) 62'	Stadium: County Ground; Attendance: 7,102; Referee: Kevin Johnson

7 January 2017 26	Southend United	2–4	Sheffield United	Southend-on-Sea
15:00 GMT	Cox 19' (yellow card) 45+1'; Atkinson (yellow card) 54'; McGlashan 88'	Report	Ebanks-Landell 3'; O'Connell 42'; Freeman (yellow card) 51' (goal) 76'; Basham (yellow card) 67'; Lavery 72'	Stadium: Roots Hall Stadium; Attendance: 7,702; Referee: Andrew Davies

14 January 2017 27	Southend United	2–1	Rochdale	Southend-on-Sea
15:00 GMT	Fortuné 15'; McGlashan (yellow card) 24' (yellow-red card) 34'; Cox 90+3'	Report	Keane (red card) 22'; Logan (yellow card) 25'; Lund (yellow card) 31'; Andrew 66'; Camps (yellow card) 74'	Stadium: Roots Hall Stadium; Attendance: 6,570; Referee: Rob Lewis

28 January 2017 28	Fleetwood Town	1–1	Southend United	Fleetwood
15:00 GMT	Bolger (yellow card) 64'; McLaughlin (yellow card) 72'; Ball 90'	Report	Wordsworth 37'; Timlin (yellow card) 41'; Atkinson (yellow card) 54'; Thompson (yellow card) 67'	Stadium: Highbury Stadium; Attendance: 2,675; Referee: Eddie Ilderton

4 February 2017 29	Southend United	3–1	Scunthorpe United	Southend-on-Sea
15:00 GMT	Fortuné 39'; Timlin (yellow card) 57'; Wordsworth (yellow card) 71'; Cox 76'; Leonard 81' (yellow card) 85'	Report	Wallace 5' (yellow card) 8'; Holmes (yellow card) 41'; Dawson (yellow card) 45+1'; Bishop (red card) 85'; Toney (yellow card) 90+3'	Stadium: Roots Hall; Attendance: 7,346; Referee: Robert Madley

11 February 2017 30	Millwall	1–0	Southend United	Bermondsey, London
15:00 GMT	Craig (yellow card) 20'; Onyedinma 62'	Report	Atkinson (red card) 34'; Robinson (yellow card) 61'; McGlashan (yellow card) 87'	Stadium: The Den; Attendance: 10,323; Referee: Andre Marriner

14 February 2017 31	Oxford United	0–2	Southend United	Oxford
19:45 GMT		Report	Fortuné 62'; Demetriou (yellow card) 77'; Robinson 88'	Stadium: Kassam Stadium; Attendance: 7,277; Referee: Darren England

18 February 2017 32	Southend United	2–2	Northampton Town	Southend-on-Sea
15:00 GMT	McGlashan 20'; Cox 31'; Coker (yellow card) 52'; Demetriou (yellow card) 84'	Report	Richards 29'; O'Toole 44'; Eardley (yellow card) 45+1'; Nyatanga (yellow card) 45+2'; Smith (yellow card) 77'; Diamond (yellow card) 90+6'	Stadium: Roots Hall; Attendance: 8,425; Referee: John Brooks

21 February 2017 33	Peterborough United	1–4	Southend United	Peterborough
19:45 GMT	Nichols 80'	Report	Cox (yellow card) 25'; Fortuné 45+1', 60'; Wordsworth 64'; Timlin 90+2'	Stadium: ABAX Stadium; Attendance: 4,597; Referee: Geoff Eltringham

25 February 2017 34	Gillingham	2–1	Southend United	Gillingham
15:00 GMT	Wright 41' (pen.), 45+3'	Report	Inniss (yellow card) 27' (yellow-red card) 45+7'; Timlin (yellow card) 75'; Ranger 83'; Cox (yellow card) 90+2'	Stadium: Priestfield Stadium; Attendance: 6,542; Referee: Dean Whitestone

4 March 2017 35	Southend United	1–1	Port Vale	Southend-on-Sea
15:00 GMT	Cox (yellow card) 64'; Wordsworth 83'; Nouble (yellow card) 87'	Report	Guy (yellow card) 60'; Eagles 78' (yellow card) 79'	Stadium: Roots Hall; Attendance: 7,545; Referee: Nigel Miller

11 March 2017 36	Bristol Rovers	2–0	Southend United	Bristol
15:00 GMT	Bodin 1'; Gaffney 31'; Mansell (yellow card) 58'	Report	Atkinson (yellow card) 22'; Cox (yellow card) 73'; Demetriou (yellow card) 90+1'	Stadium: Memorial Stadium; Attendance: 9,274; Referee: Trevor Kettle

14 March 2017 37	Coventry City	0–2	Southend United	Coventry
19:45	Kelly-Evans (yellow card) 52'	Report	Ranger 2'; Leonard 23'	Stadium: Ricoh Arena; Attendance: 7,646; Referee: John Busby

18 March 2017 38	Southend United	3–2	Walsall	Southend-on-Sea
15:00 GMT	Inniss (yellow card) 49'; Ranger 63'; Ferdinand 76'; Cox 83'; Coker (yellow card) 84'	Report	Moussa 18', 25'; O'Connor (yellow card) 82'	Stadium: Roots Hall; Attendance: 6,756; Referee: Robert Jones

25 March 2017 39	AFC Wimbledon	0–2	Southend United	Kingston upon Thames, London
15:00 GMT	Taylor (yellow card) 70'	Report	Ranger 35'; Cox 64'	Stadium: Kingsmeadow; Attendance: 4,803; Referee: Nick Kinseley

1 April 2017 40	Southend United	3–0	Oldham Athletic	Southend-on-Sea
15:00 GMT	Wordsworth (yellow card) 21' (goal) 90+6' (pen.); Cox (yellow card) 44'; Coker (yellow card) 69'; Leonard (red card) 70'; Ranger 75'; Robinson 78'	Report	Banks (yellow card) 63'; Green (yellow card) 69'; McLaughlin (yellow card) 78'; Ripley (yellow card) 90+5'	Stadium: Roots Hall; Attendance: 7,617; Referee: Kevin Johnson

4 April 2017 41	Southend United	0–1	Bolton Wanderers	Southend-on-Sea
19:45 GMT	Ranger (yellow card) 45+6'	Report	Spearing (yellow card) 41'; Pratley (yellow card) 63'; Beevers 90+1'	Stadium: Roots Hall; Attendance: 9,340; Referee: Charles Breakspear

8 April 2017 42	Charlton Athletic	2–1	Southend United	Charlton, London
15:00 BST	Holmes 6'; Thompson 74' (o.g.); Forster-Caskey (yellow card) 83'; Pearce (yellow card) 88'	Report	White 11'; Demetriou (yellow card) 82'	Stadium: The Valley; Attendance: 11,730; Referee: Roger East

14 April 2017 43	Chesterfield	0–4	Southend United	Chesterfield
15:00 BST	Anderson (yellow card) 20'; Gardner (yellow card) 28'; Donohue (red card) 45'; Grimshaw (yellow card) 80'	Report	Cox 15' (pen.), 67'; Atkinson (yellow card) 52'; Wordsworth 57'; Fortuné 71'	Stadium: Proact Stadium; Attendance: 5,529; Referee: Ross Joyce

17 April 2017 44	Southend United	1–2	Milton Keynes Dons	Southend-on-Sea
15:00 BST	Robinson (yellow card) 84'; Wordsworth (yellow card) 90+5'; Cox 90+7' (pen.)	Report	Reeves (yellow card) 35' (goal) 62'; Walsh 53'	Stadium: Roots Hall; Attendance: 9,009; Referee: Andy Haines

22 April 2017 45	Shrewsbury Town	1–0	Southend United	Shrewsbury
15:00 BST	Brown 64'; Leutwiler (yellow card) 84'	Report		Stadium: New Meadow; Attendance: 7,341; Referee: Darren England

30 April 2017 46	Southend United	1–0	Bury	Southend-on-Sea
12:00 BST	McLaughlin 22'; Robinson (yellow card) 89'; Amos (yellow card) 90+4'	Report	Burgess (yellow card) 26'; Barnett (yellow card) 57'; Moore (yellow card) 59'; Mayor (yellow card) 64'	Stadium: Roots Hall; Attendance: 9,245; Referee: Gavin Ward

=== FA Cup ===
4 November 2016 First round	Millwall	1–0	Southend United	Bermondsey, London
19:45 GMT	Archer (yellow card) 45+3'; Romeo 88'	Report	Wordsworth (yellow card) 66'; McLaughlin (yellow card) 68'; Cox (yellow card) 84'; Leonard (yellow card) 90+5'	Stadium: The Den; Attendance: 4,502; Referee: James Linington

=== EFL Cup ===
9 August 2016 First round	Southend United	1–3	Gillingham	Southend-on-Sea
19:45 BST	McLaughlin 34'; King (yellow card) 53'	Report	Wright (yellow card) 42'; Oshilaja (yellow card) 45+3'; McDonald 56'; Emmanuel-Thomas 74', 88'	Stadium: Roots Hall; Attendance: 2,816; Referee: Tim Robinson

=== EFL Trophy ===
Pos	Div	Team	Pld	W	PW	PL	L	GF	GA	GD	Pts	Qualification
1	L1	Southend United	3	2	0	0	1	3	4	−1	6	Advance to Round 2
2	ACA	Brighton & Hove Albion U21	3	1	1	0	1	3	4	−1	5	Advance to Round 2
3	L2	Stevenage	3	1	0	1	1	7	5	+2	4	
4	L2	Leyton Orient	3	1	0	0	2	3	3	0	3	

Source: Sky Sports

30 August 2016 Group stage 1	Southend United	2–0	Brighton & Hove Albion U23	Southend-on-Sea
19:45 BST	Mooney 35' (yellow card) 90+1'; Kyprianou 49'		Cadman (yellow card) 82'	Stadium: Roots Hall

4 October 2016 Group stage 2	Southend United	1–0	Leyton Orient	Southend-on-Sea
19:45 BST	Fortuné (yellow card) 41' (goal) 82'	Report	Kennedy (yellow card) 54'	Stadium: Roots Hall Stadium; Attendance: 2,383; Referee: Andy Woolmer

8 November 2016 Group stage 3	Stevenage	4–0	Southend United	Stevenage
19:45 GMT	Schumacher 8'; Godden 18'; Liburd 64', 90+1'; Gorman (yellow card) 78'	Report	Thompson (yellow card) 7'	Stadium: The Lamex Stadium; Attendance: 559; Referee: Graham Horwood

6 December 2016 Second round	Southend United	1–1 (3–4 p)	Oxford United	Southend-on-Sea
19:45 GMT	Timlin (yellow card) 76'; Wordsworth 86'	Report	Ruffels (yellow card) 28'; Taylor (yellow card) 78'; Maguire 81'	Stadium: Roots Hall Stadium; Attendance: 2,004; Referee: Trevor Kettle
	Penalties
	Cox (penalty missed); Demetriou (penalty scored); Wordsworth (penalty scored); Leonard (penalty scored); McLaughlin (penalty missed)		Maguire (penalty scored); Hemmings (penalty scored); Edwards (penalty scored); Johnson (penalty missed); Roberts (penalty scored)
