= 2015–16 Walsall F.C. season =

Walsall
2015–16 season
- Chairman: Jeff Bonser
- Manager: Dean Smith (until 30 November 2015); John Ward (30 November–18 December 2015); Sean O'Driscoll (18 December 2015–6 March 2016); Jon Whitney (from 6 March 2016)
- Stadium: Bescot Stadium
- League One: 3rd
- Play-offs: Semi-finals
- FA Cup: Fourth round
- League Cup: Third round
- FL Trophy: First round
- Top goalscorer: League: Tom Bradshaw (17); All: Tom Bradshaw (20)
Home colours	Away colours

The 2015–16 season was an eventful one for Walsall. The club had four different managers on the way to a third-place finish in League One, one point away from promotion. Defeat to Barnsley in the playoff semi-finals meant the campaign ended in disappointment, but still represented the Saddlers' highest league placing in 12 years.

== Story of the season ==
The summer of 2015 saw relatively minor changes to the Saddlers squad. 2014-15 Player of the Year Richard O'Donnell departed and was replaced by Neil Etheridge, while other notable incomings included fullback Jason Demetriou and the return of forward Milan Lalkovic.

Strong start

Things got off to a flying start, with the Saddlers winning six of their first seven games in all competitions. This included League Cup wins over Championship opponents Nottingham Forest and Brighton, setting up a third round meeting with reigning Premier League champions Chelsea. Walsall were beaten 4–1, but received praise from Chelsea manager Jose Mourinho for the club’s attractive style of play.

Managerial merry go round

The Saddlers’ good form continued and a 2–1 win over Bradford in late November left the club in fourth, three points of the top with a game in hand. However, just two days later it was announced that manager Dean Smith was leaving to charge at Championship Brentford. A caretaker trio of Jon Whitney, Neil Cutler and John Ward oversaw victory away at rivals Shrewsbury and progress to the FA Cup third round, before Sean O'Driscoll was appointed as Smith’s replacement.

The new boss got off to a bright start, with three successive wins and clean sheets. The Saddlers also got the better of old boss Smith with a 1–0 win away at Brentford in the FA Cup third round. However, things soon took a turn for the worse with the club going on a run of just two wins in 11 games. After just 16 games in charge, O’Driscoll was dismissed with the club sitting fourth five points off an automatic promotion spot with a game in hand.

Pipped by a point

Whitney was placed in temporary charge until the end of the season and the team responded with three successive victories. With league leaders Wigan Athletic having pulled away, the Saddlers were left to battle with Burton Albion and Gillingham for second spot. While the latter’s challenge faded, Burton matched the Saddlers’ efforts, meaning Walsall went into the final day of the season needing to overturn a three point deficit as well as achieving a goal difference swing of three goals on the Brewers. A 5–0 win away at Port Vale achieved the latter, but Burton’s 0–0 draw with Doncaster saw them promoted ahead of the Saddlers by one point.

A third-place finish meant Walsall would take on in-form Barnsley in the playoffs. The Tykes proved too much for the Saddlers, convincingly winning 3–0 at Oakwell and 3–1 at the Bescot. The Yorkshire side would go on to gain promotion by beating Millwall in the final.

The Saddlers’ young fullback Rico Hery and playmaker Romaine Sawyers were included in the official League one Team of the Season.

== Transfers ==
=== Transfers in ===
Date from	Position	Nationality	Name	From	Fee	Ref.
1 July 2015	RB	CYP	Jason Demetriou	Anorthosis Famagusta	Free transfer	
1 July 2015	AM	ENG	Levi Rowley	Academy	Trainee	
1 July 2015	CB	ENG	Kyle Rowley	Academy	Trainee	
2 July 2015	GK	PHI	Neil Etheridge	Charlton Athletic	Free transfer	
16 July 2015	RW	SVK	Milan Lalkovič	Barnsley	Free transfer	
3 September 2015	MF	ENG	Isaiah Osbourne	Scunthorpe United	Free transfer	

=== Loans in ===
Date from	Position	Nationality	Name	From	Date until	Ref.
20 October 2015	MF	ENG	George Evans	Manchester City	16 January 2016	
28 January 2016	MF	ENG	Bryn Morris	Middlesbrough	28 March 2016	
25 February 2016	MF	ENG	Josh Wakefield	AFC Bournemouth	End of season	
4 March 2016	FW	ENG	Jordy Hiwula	Huddersfield Town	End of season	
24 March 2016	DF	ENG	Matthew Pennington	Everton	End of season	

=== Transfers out ===
Date from	Position	Nationality	Name	To	Fee	Ref.
1 July 2015	LB	ENG	Mal Benning	Mansfield Town (Note: Following Benning's release on 5 May 2015, he later signed for Mansfield Town on 22 May 2015.)	Free transfer	
1 July 2015	AM	ENG	Ashley Grimes	Barrow (Note: Following Grimes' release on 5 May 2015, he later signed for Barrow on 16 July 2015.)	Free transfer	
1 July 2015	CM	ENG	Jake Heath	Rushall Olympic	Free Transfer	
1 July 2015	GK	ENG	Richard O'Donnell	Wigan Athletic (Note: Following O'Donnell's release on 21 May 2015, he later signed for Wigan Athletic on 22 May 2015.)	Free transfer	
1 July 2015	RB	ENG	Ben Purkiss	Port Vale (Note: Following Purkiss' release on 5 May 2015, he later signed for Port Vale on 24 June 2015.)	Free transfer	
17 July 2015	CB	ENG	James Chambers	Retired	—N/a	

=== Loans out ===
Date from	Position	Nationality	Name	To	Date until	Ref.
7 August 2015	CB	ENG	Kyle Rowley	Sutton Coldfield Town	4 September 2015	
15 August 2015	FW	SLE	Amadou Bakayoko	AFC Telford United	September 2015	
9 October 2015	FW	ENG	Jordan Murphy	Kidderminster Harriers	3 December 2015	
8 January 2016	FW	ENG	Jordan Murphy	Worcester City	End of season	
9 January 2016	FW	ENG	James Baxendale	Mansfield Town	1 February 2016	
15 January 2016	FW	SLE	Amadou Bakayoko	Worcester City	End of season	

== Competitions ==
=== Pre-season friendlies ===
On 7 May 2015, Walsall announced a pre-season friendly against Luton Town. Also Walsall would face West Bromwich Albion, AFC Telford United, Rushall Olympic and Chasetown. On 28 May 2015, Walsall added Aston Villa to their pre-season schedule.

21 July 2015 Friendly	AFC Telford United	1–0	Walsall	Telford
19:45 GMT	Goddard 43' (pen.)	Report		Stadium: New Bucks Head

22 July 2015 Friendly	Rushall Olympic	0–2	Walsall XI	Rushall
19:45 GMT		Report	Murphy; Bakayoko	Stadium: Dales Lane

25 July 2015 Friendly	Walsall	1–1	Aston Villa	Walsall
15:00 GMT	Forde	Report	Robinson	Stadium: Bescot Stadium; Attendance: 6,606

28 July 2015 Friendly	Walsall	0–2	West Bromwich Albion	Walsall
19:45 BST		Report	Berahino 61'; Ideye	Stadium: Bescot Stadium; Attendance: 5,209

1 August 2015 Friendly	Luton Town	0–1	Walsall	Luton
15:00 GMT		Report	Bradshaw 5'	Stadium: Kenilworth Road; Attendance: 2,180 (149 Walsall)

=== League One ===
==== League table ====
Pos	Team	Pld	W	D	L	GF	GA	GD	Pts	Promotion, qualification or relegation
1	Wigan Athletic (C, P)	46	24	15	7	82	45	+37	87	Promotion to EFL Championship
2	Burton Albion (P)	46	25	10	11	57	37	+20	85	Promotion to EFL Championship
3	Walsall	46	24	12	10	71	49	+22	84	Qualification for the League One play-offs (Note: Four teams play for one spot and promotion to Football League Championship.)
4	Millwall	46	24	9	13	73	49	+24	81	Qualification for the League One play-offs
5	Bradford City	46	23	11	12	55	40	+15	80	Qualification for the League One play-offs

Updated to match(es) played on 1 July 2016. Source: BBC Sport
Rules for classification: 1) Points; 2) Goal difference; 3) Number of goals scored
(C) Champions; (P) Promoted

==== Matches ====
On 17 June 2015, the fixtures for the forthcoming season were announced.

8 August 2015 1	Walsall	1–1	Oldham Athletic	Bescot
15:00 BST	Sawyers 8'	Report	Forte 83'	Stadium: Bescot Stadium; Attendance: 5,009; Referee: Mark Brown

15 August 2015 2	Southend United	0–2	Walsall	Southend-on-Sea
15:00 BST		Report	Bradshaw 8'; Mantom 48'	Stadium: Roots Hall; Attendance: 6,149; Referee: Andy Davies

18 August 2015 3	Rochdale	1–2	Walsall	Rochdale
19:45 BST	Andrew 80'	Report	Taylor 65'; Mantom 71'	Stadium: Spotland; Attendance: 2,381; Referee: David Webb

22 August 2015 4	Walsall	2–1	Coventry City	Bescot
15:00 BST	Forde 40'; Bradshaw 52'	Report	Murphy 56'	Stadium: Bescot Stadium; Attendance: 7,176; Referee: Jeremy Simpson

29 August 2015 5	Blackpool	0–4	Walsall	Blackpool
15:00 BST		Report	Sawyers 25', 74'; Aldred 57' (o.g.); Mantom 67'	Stadium: Bloomfield Road; Attendance: 7,489; Referee: Eddie Ilderton

5 September 2015 6	Walsall	0–1	Bury	Bescot
15:00 BST		Report	Jones 6'	Stadium: Bescot Stadium; Attendance: 4,829; Referee: Fred Graham

12 September 2015 7	Walsall	2–0	Doncaster Rovers	Bescot
15:00 BST	Bradshaw 85', 90'	Report		Stadium: Bescot Stadium; Attendance: 4,127; Referee: Kevin Wright

19 September 2015 8	Peterborough United	1–1	Walsall	Peterborough
15:00 BST	Bostwick 87' (pen.); J. Anderson (red card) 84'	Report	Sawyers 53'	Stadium: London Road Stadium; Attendance: 5,859; Referee: Mark Heywood

26 September 2015 9	Walsall	1–1	Crewe Alexandra	Bescot
15:00 BST	Bradshaw 3'	Report	Nugent 18'	Stadium: Bescot Stadium; Attendance: 4,229; Referee: James Linington

29 September 2015 10	Scunthorpe United	0–1	Walsall	Scunthorpe
19:45 BST		Report	Henry 27'	Stadium: Glanford Park; Attendance: 2,596; Referee: Paul Tierney (referee)

3 October 2015 11	Wigan Athletic	0–0	Walsall	Wigan
15:00	Morgan (red card) 69'	Report		Stadium: DW Stadium; Attendance: 8,636; Referee: Andy Haines

10 October 2015 12	Walsall	2–0	Burton Albion	Walsall
15:00	Kinsella 36'; Bradshaw 90+2' (pen.)	Report		Stadium: Bescot Stadium; Attendance: 6,812; Referee: Tim Robinson

17 October 2015 13	Walsall	1–2	Chesterfield	Walsall
15:00 BST	Preston 90+3'	Report	Ebanks-Blake 5'; Evatt 54'	Stadium: Bescot Stadium; Attendance: 4,766; Referee: Chris Kavanagh

20 October 2015 14	Barnsley	0–2	Walsall	Barnsley
19:45 BST		Report	Evans 62'; Lalkovič 70'	Stadium: Oakwell; Attendance: 8,561; Referee: Scott Duncan (referee)

24 October 2015 15	Colchester	4–4	Walsall	Colchester
15:00 BST	Moncur 49'; Sordell 52'; Garvan 60'; Ambrose 80'	Report	Sawyers 11'; Lalkovič 30'; Evans 57'; O'Connor 90+1'	Stadium: Colchester Community Stadium; Attendance: 3,630; Referee: Seb Stockbridge

24 October 2015 16	Walsall	3–2	Gillingham	Walsall
15:00 BST	Morris 37'; Lalkovič 38'; Demetriou 90+1'	Report	McDonald 12'; Dack 32' (pen.)	Stadium: Banks's Stadium; Attendance: 6,663; Referee: Darren Drysdale

21 November 2015 17	Walsall	1–1	Sheffield United	Bescot
15:00 GMT	Bradshaw 51'	Report	Baxter 66'	Stadium: Bescot Stadium; Attendance: 5,780; Referee: Geoff Eltringham

24 November 2015 18	Swindon Town	2–1	Walsall	Swindon
19:45 GMT	Obika 17'; Thompson 90'	Report	Bradshaw 61'	Stadium: County Ground; Attendance: 6,957; Referee: Iain Williamson

28 November 2015 19	Walsall	2–1	Bradford	Bescot
15:00 GMT	Bradshaw 11'; Lalkovič 73'	Report	Evans 64'	Stadium: Bescot Stadium; Attendance: 4,668; Referee: Mark Brown

1 December 2015 20	Shrewsbury	1–3	Walsall	Shrewsbury
19:45 GMT	Cole 40'	Report	Lalkovič 45'; Downing 80'; Cook 90'	Stadium: New Meadow; Attendance: 6,078; Referee: Peter Bankes

12 December 2015 ~~21~~ Postponed	Fleetwood Town	P–P	Walsall	Fleetwood
15:00 GMT		Report		Stadium: Highbury Stadium

20 December 2015 =22	Walsall	2–0	Port Vale	Walsall
12:00 GMT	Cook 64' 83'	Report	O'Connor (yellow card) 75'; McGivern (yellow card) 85'	Stadium: Banks's Stadium; Attendance: 4,436; Referee: Kevin Wright

26 December 2015 =23	Millwall	0–1	Walsall	London
15:00 GMT	Upson (yellow card) 81'	Report	Lalkovič 29' (yellow card) 46'; Evans (yellow card) 52'	Stadium: The Den; Attendance: 8,364; Referee: Gavin Ward

28 December 2015 =24	Walsall	2–0	Peterborough United	Walsall
15:00 GMT	Demetriou 80'; Evans 89'; Sawyers (yellow card) 90+2'	Report	Washington (yellow card) 83'; Forrester (yellow card) 90+2'; Smith (yellow card) 90+2'	Stadium: Banks's Stadium; Attendance: 6,142; Referee: Darren England

2 January 2016 =25	Walsall	0–3	Rochdale	Walsall
15:00 GMT		Report	Henderson 3'; McDermott (yellow card) 35'; Andrew 58' 77' (yellow card) 90+1'; Cannon (yellow card) 67'; Vincenti (yellow card) 82'	Stadium: Banks's Stadium; Attendance: 4,857; Referee: Graham Salisbury

12 January 2016 =26	Coventry City	1–1	Walsall	Coventry
19:45 GMT	Stokes 34'	Report	Chambers (yellow card) 65'; Bradshaw 81'; Demetriou (yellow card) 88'	Stadium: Ricoh Arena; Attendance: 15,671; Referee: Tony Harrington

16 January 2016 =27	Bury	2–3	Walsall	Bury
15:00 GMT	Rose (yellow card) 57'; Clarke 65' 66'; Lawlor (yellow card) 70'	Report	Hussey 16' (o.g.); Bradshaw 30'; Forde 42'	Stadium: Gigg Lane; Attendance: 3,532; Referee: Mark Haywood

23 January 2016 =28	Walsall	1–1	Blackpool	Walsall
15:00 GMT	Chambers (yellow card) 34'; Taylor (yellow card) 45+1'; Demetriou 66'; Downing (yellow card) 90+3'	Report	Norris (yellow card) 18'; Aldred (yellow card) 48'; McAlister (yellow card) 85'; Philliskirk 90+4'	Stadium: Banks's Stadium; Attendance: 5,022; Referee: Dean Whitestone

2 February 2016 =29	Doncaster Rovers	1–2	Walsall	Doncaster
19:45 GMT	Mandeville 80'	Report	Mantom 61'; Taylor 65'	Stadium: Keepmoat Stadium; Attendance: 5,056; Referee: Ben Toner

6 February 2016 30	Walsall	0–3	Millwall	Walsall
15:00 GMT		Report	Romeo (yellow card) 14', (goal) 70'; Gregory 61', 77'	Stadium: Banks's Stadium; Attendance: 4,843; Referee: Trevor Kettle

13 February 2016 31	Crewe Alexandra	1–1	Walsall	Crewe
15:00 GMT	Inman 49'	Report	Bradshaw 32' (pen.)	Stadium: Alexandra Stadium; Attendance: 5,123; Referee: Darren Handley

20 February 2016 32	Walsall	1–2	Wigan Athletic	Walsall
15:00 GMT	Mantom (yellow card) 8' (goal) 68'; Lalkovič (yellow card) 10'; Chambers (yellow card) 44'; Preston (yellow card) 65'; Demetriou (yellow card) 90+4'	Report	Perkins (yellow card) 14'; McAleny 39'; Wildschut 90+1'	Stadium: Banks's Stadium; Attendance: 6,740; Referee: Ian Williamson

27 February 2016 33	Burton Albion	0–0	Walsall	Burton upon Trent
15:00 GMT		Report	Downing (yellow card) 81'	Stadium: Pirelli Stadium; Attendance: 5,512; Referee: James Adcock

1 March 2016 34	Walsall	0–0	Scunthorpe United	Walsall
19:45 GMT		Report		Stadium: Banks's Stadium; Attendance: 3,868; Referee: Geoff Eltringham

5 March 2016 35	Walsall	1–3	Barnsley	Walsall
15:00 GMT	Bradshaw 28'	Report	Fletcher 17'; Brownhill 50'; Harry Chapman 56'; Callum Connolly (yellow card) 79'	Stadium: Banks's Stadium; Attendance: 5,199; Referee: Gavin Ward

12 March 2016 36	Chesterfield	1–4	Walsall	Chesterfield
15:00 GMT	O'Connor 19' (o.g.); Banks (yellow card) 59'; Hird (yellow card) 60'; Donohue (red card) 61'; Novak (yellow card) 68'	Report	Anderson 35' (o.g.); Mantom 57' (yellow card) 60' (goal) 75'; Hiwula 71'	Stadium: Proact Stadium; Attendance: 6,938; Referee: Ross Joyce

15 March 2016 21	Fleetwood Town	0–1	Walsall	Fleetwood
19:45 GMT		Report	Bradshaw 49'	Stadium: Highbury Stadium; Attendance: 2,569; Referee: Chris Kavanagh

19 March 2016 37	Walsall	2–1	Colchester United	Walsall
15:00 GMT	Sawyers (yellow card) 74'; Bradshaw 89' (yellow card) 90+1'; Preston 90+4'; Etheridge (yellow card) 90+6'	Report	Gilbey (yellow card) 30' (goal) 45+1'; Edwards (yellow card) 86'	Stadium: Banks's Stadium; Attendance: 5,818; Referee: Andy Haines

2 April 2016 38	Sheffield United	2–0	Walsall	Sheffield
15:00 GMT	Basham 31'; Sharp 36'; Hammond (yellow card) 56'; McEveley (yellow card) 84'	Report	Pennington (yellow card) 71'	Stadium: Bramall Lane; Attendance: 19,214; Referee: Lee Swabey

9 April 2016 39	Oldham Athletic	1–0	Walsall	Oldham
15:00 GMT	Main 63'; Gerrard (yellow card) 78'; Dummigan (yellow card) 83'; Jones (yellow card) 85'	Report		Stadium: Boundary Park; Attendance: 4,396; Referee: Ben Toner

12 April 2016 40	Gillingham	1–2	Walsall	Gillingham, Kent
19:45 GMT	Norris 90+5'; Dickenson (yellow card) 90+7'	Report	Chambers (yellow card) 47'; Lalkovič 68'; Hiwula 77'; Demetriou (yellow card) 90+6'	Stadium: MEMS Priestfield Stadium; Attendance: 6,246; Referee: Stuart Attwell

16 April 2016 41	Walsall	1–0	Southend United	Walsall
15:00 GMT	Chambers (yellow card) 77'; Morris (yellow card) 85'; Hiwula 88'	Report	Atkinson (yellow card) 31'; Deegan (yellow card) 81'	Stadium: Banks's Stadium; Attendance: 5,732; Referee: Keith Hill

19 April 2016 42	Walsall	1–1	Swindon Town	Walsall
19:45 GMT	Forde (yellow card) 60'; Morris 71'	Report	Doughty 59'; Barry (yellow card) 64'	Stadium: Banks's Stadium; Attendance: 5,095; Referee: Nick Kinseley

23 April 2016 43	Bradford City	4–0	Walsall	Bradford
15:00 GMT	Burke (yellow card) 31'; Morais 54'; Hanson 58', 72', 73'; Proctor (yellow card) 90+3'	Report	Taylor (yellow card) 53'; Downing (yellow card) 90'	Stadium: Coral Windows Stadium; Attendance: 19,336; Referee: Darren Drysdale

26 April 2016 44	Walsall	2–1	Shrewsbury Town	Walsall
19:45 GMT	K. Morris 11'; Henry 44'; Cook (yellow card) 90+2'	Report	Wesolowski (yellow card) 27'; Sadler 60'; Black (yellow card) 77'	Stadium: Banks's Stadium; Attendance: 5,339; Referee: David Coote

2 May 2016 45	Walsall	3–1	Fleetwood Town	Walsall
12:15 GMT	Bradshaw 2'; Downing 18'; Sawyers 58'	Report	Ball (yellow card) 79'; Cole 84'	Stadium: Banks's Stadium; Attendance: 6,628; Referee: Tim Robinson

8 May 2016 46	Port Vale	0–5	Walsall	Burslem
12:30 GMT	Duffy (yellow card) 45+1'; Foley (yellow card) 60'	Report	Downing 23'; Bradshaw 26'; Forde 38' 67'; Mantom 71'; Hiwula (yellow card) 84'	Stadium: Vale Park; Attendance: 8,595; Referee: Nigel Miller

=== Play Off ===
14 May 2016 First Leg	Barnsley	3–0	Walsall	Barnsley
17:30 GMT	Demetriou 45' (o.g.); Winnall 54', 55'	Report		Stadium: Oakwell; Attendance: 16,051; Referee: Peter Bankes

19 May 2016 Second Leg	Walsall	1–3	Barnsley	Walsall
19:45 GMT	Cook 85'	Report	Hammill 18'; Fletcher 66'; Brownhill 90'	Stadium: Banks's Stadium; Attendance: 8,022; Referee: Darren Deadman

=== FA Cup ===
7 November 2015 First round	Walsall	2–0	Fleetwood Town	Blowick
15:00 GMT	Evans 19'; Forde 90+2'	Report		Stadium: Merseyrail Community Stadium; Attendance: 2,532; Referee: Ross Joyce

5 December 2015 Second round	Chesterfield	1–1	Walsall	Chesterfield
15:00 GMT	Novak 90+3'	Report	Demetriou 19'	Stadium: Proact Stadium; Attendance: 4,126; Referee: Richard Clark

15 December 2015 Second round replay	Walsall	0–0 (5–3 p)	Chesterfield	Walsall
19:45 GMT		Report		Stadium: Bescot Stadium; Attendance: 2,953; Referee: Charles Breakspear
	Penalties
	Sawyers (penalty scored); Demetriou (penalty scored); Evans (penalty scored); Lalkovič (penalty scored); Downing (penalty scored)		O'Shea (penalty scored); Morsy (penalty missed); Novak (penalty scored); O'Neil (penalty scored)

9 January 2016 Third round	Brentford	0–1	Walsall	Brentford
15:00 GMT		Report	Mantom 34' (yellow card) 55' (yellow-red card); Bradshaw (yellow card) 60'	Stadium: Griffin Park; Attendance: 7,950; Referee: Andrew Davies

30 January 2016 Fourth round	Reading	4–0	Walsall	Reading
15:00 GMT	Robson-Kanu 37'; Vydra 40' 89'; Ferdinand (yellow card) 58'; Williams 75'	Report	Demetriou (yellow card) 35'; Chambers (yellow card) 59'	Stadium: Madejski Stadium; Attendance: 13,367; Referee: Peter Bankes

=== League Cup ===
On 16 June 2015, the first round draw was made, Walsall were drawn away against Nottingham Forest. In the second round Walsall were drawn at home against Brighton & Hove Albion.

11 August 2015 First round	Nottingham Forest	3–4	Walsall	Nottingham
19:45 BST	Walker 32'; Antonio 81', 90'	Report	Bradshaw 11', 14', 90' (pen.); Sawyers 79'	Stadium: City Ground; Attendance: 5,237; Referee: Darren Handley

25 August 2015 Second round	Walsall	2–1	Brighton & Hove Albion	Bescot
19:45 BST	Lalkovič 65'; Henry 86'	Report	Forster-Caskey 39' (pen.)	Stadium: Bescot Stadium; Attendance: 2,968; Referee: Peter Bankes

23 September 2015 Third round	Walsall	1–4	Chelsea	Walsall
19:45 BST	O'Connor 45'	Report	Ramires 10'; Rémy 41'; Nunes do Nascimento 52'; Pedro 90'	Stadium: Bescot Stadium; Attendance: 10,525; Referee: Lee Mason

=== Football League Trophy ===
On 8 August 2015, live on Soccer AM the draw for the first round of the Football League Trophy was drawn by Toni Duggan and Alex Scott.

1 September 2015 First round	Morecambe	2–0	Walsall	Morecambe
19:45 BST	Devitt 57'; Barkhuizen 72'	Report		Stadium: Globe Arena; Attendance: 1,332; Referee: Seb Stockbridge

=== Birmingham Senior Cup ===
On the Birmingham FA website the first round details were announced, Walsall will face Rugby Town.

6 October 2015 First round	Rugby Town	0–0 (a.e.t.) (2–4 p)	Walsall	Rugby
19:45 BST		Report		Stadium: Butlin Road

25 November 2015 Second round	Stafford Town	2–0	Walsall	Stafford
19:45 BST		Report		Stadium: Evans Park

== Squad statistics ==
Numbers in parentheses denote appearances as substitute.
Players with squad numbers struck through and marked † left the club during the playing season.
Players with names in italics and marked * were on loan from another club for the whole of their season with Walsall.
Players listed with no appearances have been in the matchday squad but only as unused substitutes.
Key to positions: GK – Goalkeeper; DF – Defender; MF – Midfielder; FW – Forward

No.	Pos.	Nat.	Name	Apps	Goals	Apps	Goals	Apps	Goals	Apps	Goals	Apps	Goals	Apps	Goals	Yellow card	Red card
No.	Pos.	Nat.	Name	League		FA Cup		League Cup		FL Trophy		Play-offs		Total		Discipline	
1	GK	PHI	Neil Etheridge	40	0	5	0	3	0	0	0	2	0	50	0	3	0
2	DF	CYP	Jason Demetriou	42 (1)	3	4	1	3	0	0	0	2	0	51 (1)	4	8	0
3	DF	ENG	Andy Taylor	33 (1)	2	2 (1)	0	0	0	1	0	1	0	37 (2)	2	4	0
4	DF	ENG	James O'Connor	37	1	4	0	3	1	1	0	2	0	47	2	3	0
~~5~~ †	DF	ENG	Matthew Pennington *	5	0	0	0	0	0	0	0	0	0	5	0	1	0
6	DF	ENG	Paul Downing	46	3	5	0	3	0	0	0	2	0	56	3	7	0
7	MF	ENG	Adam Chambers	45	0	5	0	3	0	1	0	2	0	56	0	8	0
8	MF	ENG	Sam Mantom	33 (4)	8	3 (1)	1	3	0	1	0	1 (1)	0	42 (5)	9	4	0
9	FW	WAL	Tom Bradshaw	38 (3)	17	3	0	2	3	1	0	2	0	46 (3)	20	2	0
10	MF	SKN	Romaine Sawyers	45 (1)	6	5	0	1 (2)	1	0 (1)	0	2	0	53 (4)	7	4	0
~~11~~ †	MF	ENG	James Baxendale	0 (3)	0	0 (1)	0	0 (1)	0	0 (1)	0	0	0	0 (6)	0	0	0
12	MF	IRL	Anthony Forde	26 (15)	4	2 (3)	1	0 (2)	0	0 (1)	0	1 (1)	0	29 (22)	5	2	0
13	GK	ENG	Craig MacGillivray	5	0	0 (2)	0	0	0	1	0	0	0	6 (2)	0	0	0
14	DF	ENG	Rico Henry	30 (5)	2	4	0	3	1	0	0	2	0	39 (5)	3	1	0
15	MF	SVK	Milan Lalkovič	27 (13)	7	3 (1)	0	3	1	1	0	1 (1)	0	35 (15)	8	4	0
16	DF	ENG	Matt Preston	4 (6)	2	1	0	0 (1)	0	1	0	0	0	6 (7)	2	1	0
17	MF	ENG	Reece Flanagan	8 (6)	0	0	0	2 (1)	0	0	0	0	0	10 (7)	0	0	0
18	MF	ENG	Kieron Morris	12 (21)	3	2 (2)	0	3	0	1	0	1	0	19 (23)	3	3	0
20	FW	SLE	Amadou Bakayoko	0	0	0 (1)	0	0	0	0	0	0	0	0 (1)	0	0	0
21	FW	ENG	Jordan Cook	5 (29)	3	2 (2)	0	1 (2)	0	0 (1)	0	0 (2)	1	8 (36)	4	2	0
22	MF	IRL	Liam Kinsella	4 (3)	1	1	0	0	0	1	0	0	0	6 (3)	1	0	0
23	GK	ENG	Liam Roberts	1	0	0	0	0	0	0	0	0	0	1	0	0	0
26	MF	ENG	Isaiah Osbourne	0	0	0	0	0	0	0	0	0	0	0	0	0	0
~~27~~ †	MF	ENG	George Evans *	12	3	4	1	0	0	0	0	0	0	16	4	4	0
27	MF	ENG	Bryn Morris *	0 (1)	0	0	0	0	0	0	0	0	0	0 (1)	0	0	0
28	MF	ENG	Jordan Sangha	0	0	0	0	0	0	0	0	0	0	0	0	0	0
29	MF	AFG	Maziar Kouhyar	0	0	0	0	0	0	0	0	0	0	0	0	0	0
30	GK	ENG	Dan Jezeph	0	0	0	0	0	0	0	0	0	0	0	0	0	0
31	FW	ENG	Jordy Hiwula *	8 (5)	3	0	0	0	0	0	0	1 (1)	0	9 (6)	3	1	0

Players not included in matchday squads
No.	Pos.	Nat.	Name
11	MF	ENG	Josh Wakefield *
19	FW	ENG	Jordan Murphy
24	FW	ENG	Levi Rowley
~~25~~ †	DF	ENG	Kyle Rowley
