= 2009–10 Leyton Orient F.C. season =

Leyton Orient
2009–10 season
- Manager: Geraint Williams (until 3 April); Russell Slade (from 6 April)
- Stadium: Brisbane Road
- Football League One: 17th
- FA Cup: First round
- League Cup: Second round
- Football League Trophy: Second round

During the 2009–10 English football season, Leyton Orient F.C. competed in Football League One.

== League table ==
Pos	Team	Pld	W	D	L	GF	GA	GD	Pts
15	Yeovil Town	46	13	14	19	55	59	−4	53
16	Oldham Athletic	46	13	13	20	39	57	−18	52
17	Leyton Orient	46	13	12	21	53	63	−10	51
18	Exeter City	46	11	18	17	48	60	−12	51
19	Tranmere Rovers	46	14	9	23	45	72	−27	51

Source: The Football League
Rules for classification: 1) points; 2) goal difference; 3) number of goals scored.

== Competitions ==
=== League One ===
==== Results ====
9 August 2009 1	Bristol Rovers	1–2	Leyton Orient	Bristol
	Lambert 44'		Melligan 40'; Smith 67'	Stadium: Memorial Stadium

15 August 2009 2	Leyton Orient	1–2	Oldham Athletic	London
	Jarvis 31'		Abbott 12', 59' (pen.)	Stadium: Brisbane Road

18 August 2009 3	Leyton Orient	1–2	Charlton Athletic	London
	Mkandawire 27'		Shelvey 64'; Burton 84'	Stadium: Brisbane Road

22 August 2009 4	Yeovil Town	3–3	Leyton Orient	Yeovil
	Tomlin 11' (pen.); Obika 40'; Schofield 52'		McGleish 5'; Townsend 42'; Jarvis 61'	Stadium: Huish Park

29 August 2009 5	Leyton Orient	2–2	Carlisle United	London
	McGleish 48' (pen.), 85'		Robson 42'; Thirlwell 90'	Stadium: Brisbane Road

4 September 2009 6	Southend United	3–0	Leyton Orient	Southend
	Barnard 59' (pen.), 78', 90'			Stadium: Roots Hall

12 September 2009 7	Leyton Orient	1–1	Exeter City	London
	Stewart 26' (o.g.)		Noone 79'	Stadium: Brisbane Road

19 September 2009 8	Stockport County	2–1	Leyton Orient	Stockport
	Bignall 49'; Tansey 77'		Mkandawire 88'	Stadium: Edgeley Park

26 September 2009 9	Leyton Orient	1–0	Millwall	London
	Townsend 57'			Stadium: Brisbane Road

29 September 2009 10	Norwich City	4–0	Leyton Orient	Norwich
	Martin 75'; Holt 78'; Spillane 81'; Cureton 90'		Melligan (red card) 53'	Stadium: Carrow Road

3 October 2009 11	Wycombe Wanderers	0–1	Leyton Orient	Wycombe
			McGleish 77'	Stadium: Adams Park

10 October 2009 12	Leyton Orient	0–1	Colchester United	London
			Odejayi 54'	Stadium: Brisbane Road

17 October 2009 13	Leyton Orient	2–1	Brentford	London
	McGleish 36'; Foster 65' (o.g.)		Cort 4'	Stadium: Brisbane Road

24 October 2009 14	Huddersfield Town	4–0	Leyton Orient	Huddersfield
	Roberts 45'; Clarke 57'; Collins 74'; Rhodes 90'			Stadium: Galpharm Stadium

31 October 2009 15	Leyton Orient	2–2	Southampton	London
	Mkandawire 2'; Trotman 56' (o.g.)		Lambert 74', 84'	Stadium: Brisbane Road

14 November 2009 16	Hartlepool United	1–0	Leyton Orient	Hartlepool
	Boyd 81'			Stadium: Victoria Park

21 November 2009 17	Leyton Orient	2–1	Tranmere Rovers	London
	McGleish 24', 70'		Barnett 29'	Stadium: Brisbane Road

24 November 2009 18	Leeds United	1–0	Leyton Orient	Leeds
	Gradel 89'			Stadium: Elland Road

1 December 2009 19	Leyton Orient	3–1	Gillingham	London
	Jarvis 4'; Thornton 28'; Smith 49'		Weston 20'	Stadium: Brisbane Road

5 December 2009 20	Swindon Town	3–2	Leyton Orient	Swindon
	Paynter 51' (pen.); Austin 76', 85'		Thornton 67', 90'; Mkandawire (red card) 87'	Stadium: County Ground

12 December 2009 21	Leyton Orient	1–2	Milton Keynes Dons	London
	McGleish 17'		Morgan 79'; Quashie 89'	Stadium: Brisbane Road

19 December 2009 22	Walsall	2–2	Leyton Orient	Walsall
	Deeney 46', 57'		Jarvis 2'; Mkandawire 29'	Stadium: Bescot Stadium

26 December 2009 23	Brighton & Hove Albion	0–0	Leyton Orient	Brighton
	Crofts (red card) 70'			Stadium: Withdean Stadium

28 December 2009 24	Leyton Orient	1–2	Southend United	London
	Chambers 57'		Barrett 59'; McCormack 74'	Stadium: Brisbane Road

19 January 2010 25	Leyton Orient	2–0	Yeovil Town	London
	Mkandawire 14'; McGleish 79'			Stadium: Brisbane Road

25 January 2010 26	Charlton Athletic	0–1	Leyton Orient	London
			McGleish 48'	Stadium: The Valley

29 January 2010 27	Carlisle United	2–2	Leyton Orient	Carlisle
	Anyinsah 14'; Harte 42'		Jarvis 59'; Livesey 77' (o.g.)	Stadium: Brunton Park

2 February 2010 28	Leyton Orient	5–0	Bristol Rovers	London
	Purches 26'; Jarvis 51'; Andersen 62' (o.g.); Demetriou 71'; Tehoue 89'			Stadium: Brisbane Road

6 February 2010 29	Leyton Orient	1–1	Brighton & Hove Albion	London
	McGleish 53'		Murray 10'	Stadium: Brisbane Road

13 February 2010 30	Leyton Orient	1–1	Leeds United	London
	Mkandawire 83'		Daniels 90' (o.g.)	Stadium: Brisbane Road

20 February 2010 31	Tranmere Rovers	2–1	Leyton Orient	Birkenhead
	Thomas-Moore 27'; Sordell 35'		Tehoue 86'	Stadium: Prenton Park

23 February 2010 32	Gillingham	1–1	Leyton Orient	Gillingham
	Dickson 8'		Mkandawire 72'	Stadium: Priestfield Stadium

27 February 2010 33	Leyton Orient	0–0	Swindon Town	London
				Stadium: Brisbane Road

6 March 2010 34	Milton Keynes Dons	1–0	Leyton Orient	Milton Keynes
	Carrington 31'			Stadium: Stadium MK

9 March 2010 35	Oldham Athletic	2–0	Leyton Orient	Oldham
	Smalley 20'; Stephens 49'			Stadium: Boundary Park

13 March 2010 36	Leyton Orient	2–0	Walsall	London
	Thornton 63', 73'			Stadium: Brisbane Road

20 March 2010 37	Leyton Orient	0–2	Huddersfield Town	London
			Rhodes 26'; Robinson 68'	Stadium: Brisbane Road

27 March 2010 38	Brentford	1–0	Leyton Orient	London
	Grabban 43'			Stadium: Griffin Park

3 April 2010 39	Leyton Orient	1–3	Hartlepool United	London
	Patulea 84'		Liddle 22', 39'; O'Donovan 27'	Stadium: Brisbane Road

5 April 2010 40	Southampton	2–1	Leyton Orient	Southampton
	Lallana 41', 54'		Spicer 2'	Stadium: St Mary's Stadium

10 April 2010 41	Exeter City	0–0	Leyton Orient	Exeter
				Stadium: St James Park

13 April 2010 42	Leyton Orient	2–1	Norwich City	London
	Thornton 3', 29'		Smith 19'	Stadium: Brisbane Road

17 April 2010 43	Leyton Orient	2–0	Stockport County	London
	Jarvis 53'; Lichaj 80'			Stadium: Brisbane Road

24 April 2010 44	Millwall	2–1	Leyton Orient	London
	Robinson 69'; Morison 80' (pen.)		Chorley 90'	Stadium: The Den

1 May 2010 45	Leyton Orient	2–0	Wycombe Wanderers	London
	Jarvis 78'; McGleish 90'			Stadium: Brisbane Road

8 May 2010 46	Colchester United	1–0	Leyton Orient	Colchester
	Lisbie 90' (pen.)		Ashworth (red card) 90'	Stadium: Weston Homes Community Stadium

=== Football League Cup ===
As with all League One sides, Leyton Orient F.C. entered the Football League Cup in the first round.

11 August 2009 1	Colchester United	1–2	Leyton Orient	Colchester
	Hackney 90'; Platt (red card) 90'		Patulea 2'; Melligan 63'	Stadium: Weston Homes Community Stadium

26 August 2009 2	Leyton Orient	0–1 (a.e.t.)	Stoke City	London
			Kitson 94'	Stadium: Brisbane Road

=== Football League Trophy ===
6 October 2009 2	Leyton Orient	1–0	Brighton & Hove Albion	London
	Patulea 89'			Stadium: Brisbane Road

10 November 2009 SQF	Leyton Orient	1–1 (a.e.t.) (2–3 p)	Hereford United	London
	Demetriou 90'		Constantine 25'	Stadium: Brisbane Road

=== FA Cup ===
As Leyton Orient were playing in League One, they entered the FA Cup in the first round proper.

7 November 2009 1	Tranmere Rovers	1–1	Leyton Orient	Birkenhead
	Shuker 51'		Ashworth 7'	Stadium: Prenton Park

17 November 2009 1 Replay	Leyton Orient	0–1	Tranmere Rovers	London
			Taylor 83'	Stadium: Brisbane Road
