= Jason Demetriou (footballer) =

Cypriot footballer (born 1987)

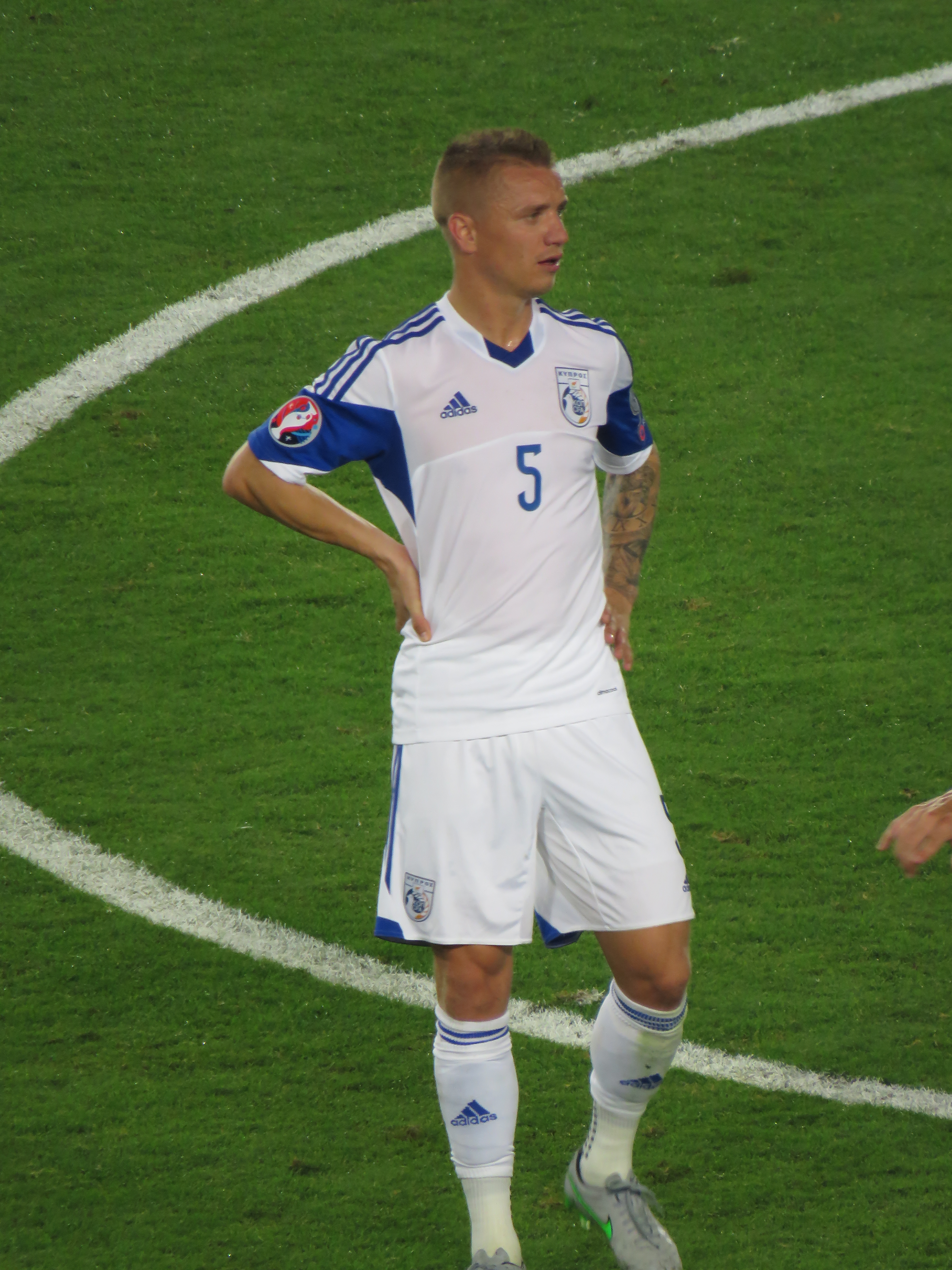
- Demetriou with Cyprus in 2015

Personal information
- Full name: Jason Demetriou
- Date of birth: 18 November 1987 (age 39)
- Place of birth: Newham, England
- Height: 5 ft 11 in (1.80 m)
- Position: Right back

Team information
- Current team: Canvey Island

Youth career
- –2005: Leyton Orient

Senior career*
Years	Team	Apps	(Gls)
2005–2010	Leyton Orient	144	(5)
2010–2013	AEK Larnaca	58	(4)
2013–2015	Anorthosis Famagusta	44	(1)
2015–2016	Walsall	43	(1)
2016–2024	Southend United	241	(20)
2026–	Canvey Island	1	(0)

International career^{‡}
2009–2019	Cyprus	51	(1)

Managerial career
- 2021: Southend United (caretaker)
- * Club domestic league appearances and goals as of 18:15, 21 November 2026 (UTC) ‡ National team caps and goals as of 15:30, 12 May 2022 (UTC)

Jason Demetriou (Greek: Τζέισον Δημητρίου; born 18 November 1987) is a Cypriot international footballer who plays as a defender for Isthmian League North Division club Canvey Island

== Career ==
=== Leyton Orient ===
Demetriou came through the youth ranks at English club Leyton Orient and signed his first full professional contract with the team in July 2006. He made his league debut in November 2006 when he came off the bench in a 0–0 draw with Yeovil Town. He went on to make 24 appearances in his first year, in both league and cup competitions, mostly as a substitute.

The 2007–08 season was a breakthrough season winning the young talent award for Leyton Orient. Demetriou himself has given much credit to ex-manager Martin Ling for giving him the chance to prove himself at this level of football particularly in the 2007–08 season.

Despite Leyton Orient struggling throughout the 2008–09 season, Demetriou's performances impressed the fans and he was linked with big money moves away to Premiership and Championship clubs Plymouth Argyle and Charlton Athletic. The Orient play-maker publicly stated his intent to stay at Brisbane Road and, at the end of the season, was awarded the Fans' Player of the Year award.

=== AEK Larnaca ===
Demetriou officially signed for AEK Larnaca on 2 June 2010, for an undisclosed fee, to be able to progress as an international for Cyprus. He said he was very sad to leave Leyton Orient but had to move in order to play international football.

=== Anorthosis Famagusta ===
On 28 June 2013, Demetriou signed a three-year contract with Anorthosis Famagusta. On 31 August 2013, scored on his Anorthosis Famagusta debut, in a 3–1 win against Omonia.

=== Walsall ===
On 1 July 2015, it was confirmed that Demetriou had signed a contract for Walsall for an undisclosed fee, pending international clearance.

=== Southend United ===
On 22 June 2016, it was announced Demetriou had signed for Southend United, subject to a medical being completed. Demetriou had turned down a new deal at Walsall and also the chance to move to Portsmouth. In October 2021, Demetriou took charge of the first team as interim head coach following the sacking of Phil Brown as manager, winning his only game in charge, a 4–1 win over Chertsey Town in the FA Cup fourth qualifying round on 16 October 2021.

Prior to the 2023–24 season, Demetriou joined Kevin Maher's coaching staff at Southend.

On 30 August 2024, after 260 appearances in all competitions, Demetriou announced he had left Southend United. One month after leaving Demetriou was announced as Southend's new chief scout. He departed his role as chief scout at the end of the 2025–26 season.

=== Canvey Island ===
On 21 November 2026, Demetriou returned to playing football, joining Isthmian League North Division club Canvey Island.

== International career ==
On 20 January 2009, he was called up to Cyprus squad for the first time by manager Angelos Anastasiadis, qualifying thanks to his Greek Cypriot paternal roots. He made his debut against Serbia in the 2–0 home defeat coming on as a sub for Demetris Christofi on 10 February. On 11 February Demetriou made his second appearance and full debut against Slovakia, where he assisted two goals in a 3–2 win for Cyprus. He was awarded man of the match award for his performance in this match. On 10 October 2015, he scored his first international goal, netting the winner in the 1–2 away win for Cyprus against Israel in the UEFA Euro 2016 qualification stage, which allowed Wales to qualify for UEFA Euro 2016 despite losing to Bosnia and Herzegovina. Demetriou retired from international football in 2020.

== Career statistics ==
=== Club ===
As of match played 29 March 2024

Appearances and goals by club, season and competition
Club	Season	League			National Cup		League Cup		Other		Total	
Club	Season	Division	Apps	Goals	Apps	Goals	Apps	Goals	Apps	Goals	Apps	Goals
Leyton Orient	2005–06	League Two	3	0	0	0	0	0	2 (Note: Appearance(s) in Football League Trophy)	0	5	0
Leyton Orient	2006–07	League One	15	0	3	0	0	0	1	0	19	0
Leyton Orient	2007–08	League One	43	0	2	0	2	0	2	0	49	0
Leyton Orient	2008–09	League One	43	4	3	0	1	0	2	0	49	4
Leyton Orient	2009–10	League One	40	1	2	0	2	0	2	0	46	1
Leyton Orient	Total		144	5	10	0	5	0	9	0	168	5
AEK Larnaca	2010–11	Cypriot First Division	16	0	0	0	—		—		16	0
AEK Larnaca	2011–12	Cypriot First Division	23	1	5	0	—		11 (Note: Appearances in UEFA Europa League)	0	39	1
AEK Larnaca	2012–13	Cypriot First Division	19	3	1	0	—		—		20	3
AEK Larnaca	Total		58	4	6	0	—		11	0	75	4
Anorthosis Famagusta	2013–14	Cypriot First Division	19	1	2	0	—		—		21	1
Anorthosis Famagusta	2014–15	Cypriot First Division	25	0	2	0	—		0	0	27	0
Anorthosis Famagusta	Total		44	1	4	0	—		0	0	48	1
Walsall	2015–16	League One	43	1	4	1	3	0	2 (Note: Appearances in League One play-offs)	0	52	4
Southend United	2016–17	League One	41	1	1	0	1	0	1 (Note: Appearance in EFL Trophy)	0	44	1
Southend United	2017–18	League One	42	8	1	0	1	0	1	0	45	8
Southend United	2018–19	League One	24	2	2	0	1	0	1	0	28	2
Southend United	2019–20	League One	20	3	0	0	1	0	1	0	22	3
Southend United	2020–21	League Two	37	1	1	0	0	0	0	0	38	1
Southend United	2021–22	National League	33	4	0	0	0	0	0	0	33	4
Southend United	2022–23	National League	17	1	0	0	0	0	0	0	17	1
Southend United	2023–24	National League	26	0	0	0	0	0	1 (Note: Appearance in FA Trophy)	0	27	0
Southend United	Total		239	20	5	0	4	0	5	0	253	20
Career total			495	32	29	1	12	0	27	0	595	32

=== International ===
As of match played 16 November 2019

Appearances and goals by national team and year
National team	Year	Apps	Goals
Cyprus	2009	3	0
Cyprus	2010	0	0
Cyprus	2011	10	0
Cyprus	2012	7	0
Cyprus	2013	4	0
Cyprus	2014	1	0
Cyprus	2015	5	1
Cyprus	2016	5	0
Cyprus	2017	8	0
Cyprus	2018	6	0
Cyprus	2019	2	0
Total		51	1

=== International goals ===
As of match played 16 November 2019. Cyprus score listed first, score column indicates score after each Demetriou goal.

International goals by date, venue, cap, opponent, score, result and competition
No.	Date	Venue	Cap	Opponent	Score	Result	Competition
1	10 October 2015	Teddy Stadium, Jerusalem, Israel	29	Israel	2–1	2–1	UEFA Euro 2016 qualification
