= Jack Jeffery =

English footballer (born 1989)

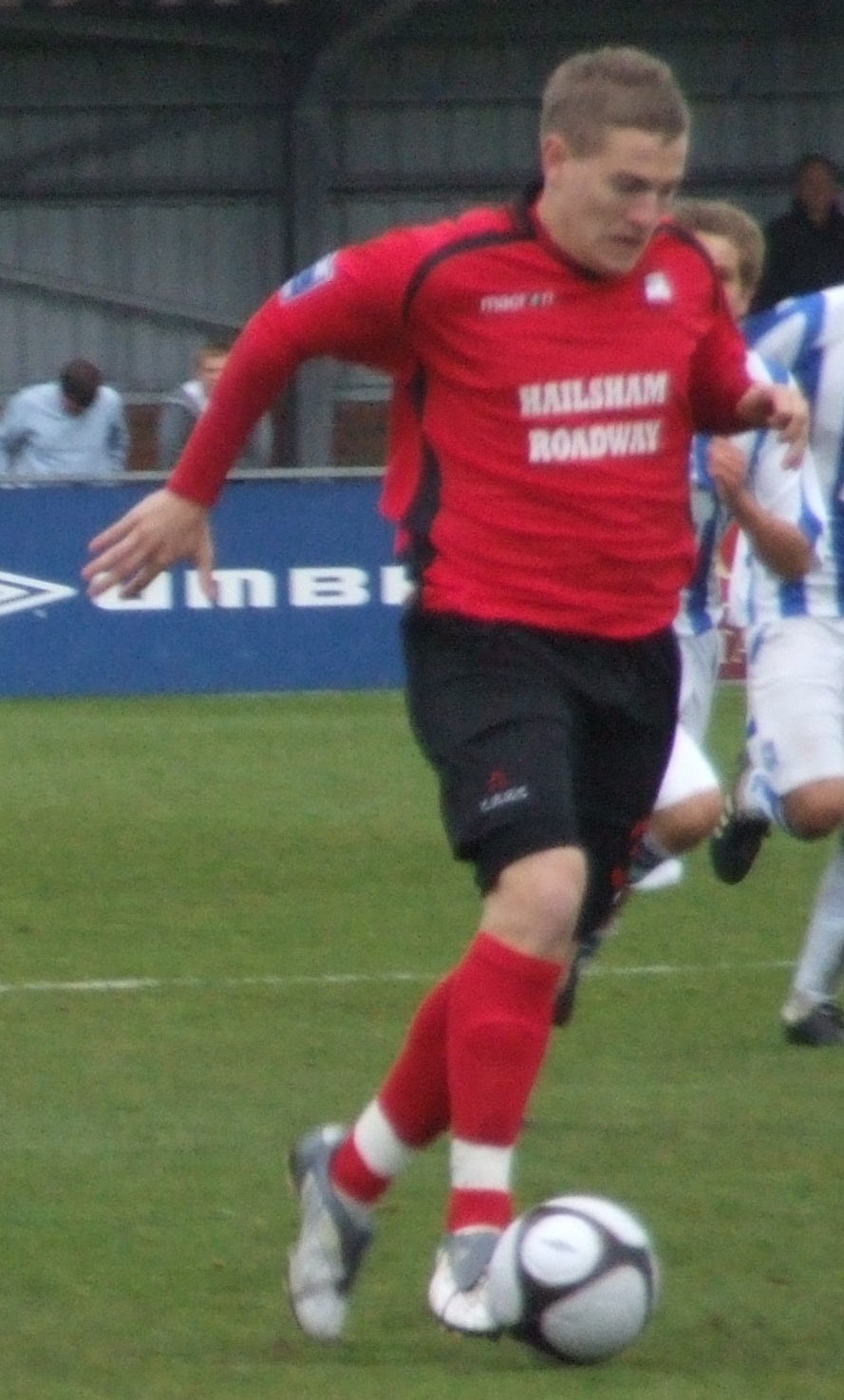

Personal information
- Full name: Jack Charles Jeffery
- Date of birth: 13 August 1989 (age 37)
- Place of birth: Gravesend, England
- Position: Striker

Youth career
- 2004–2007: West Ham United

Senior career*
Years	Team	Apps	(Gls)
2007–2009	West Ham United	0	(0)
2007	→ Hampton & Richmond Borough (loan)	6	(0)
2008	→ Cambridge United (loan)	10	(1)
2008	→ Leyton Orient (loan)	1	(0)
2009	→ Eastbourne Borough (loan)	13	(3)
2009	Grays Athletic	4	(0)
2009–2010	Maldon Town		
2011	Sevenoaks Town		
2011–2013	Chatham Town		
2013–2014	Corinthian		
2014–2015	Greenways		
2015–2016	Chatham Town		
- * Club domestic league appearances and goals

Jack Charles Jeffery (born 13 August 1989) is an English retired footballer who most notably played as a striker for West Ham United and Leyton Orient.

== Career ==
Jeffery joined West Ham United in 2004, where he was known as "JJ" by his teammates. During the 2007–08 season at West Ham, Jeffery featured regularly at under-18 level and also in the reserves, as well as loan spells at non-league clubs Hampton & Richmond Borough and Cambridge United. He joined League One club Leyton Orient on loan on 12 September 2008, and made his league debut the next day, coming on as a substitute during the first half in the home game against Stockport County. Jeffery's loan with Leyton Orient lasted only one game before he was injured and returned to West Ham. On 2 March 2009, Jeffery signed on loan for Eastbourne Borough until the end of the 2008–09 season. His first goals for Eastbourne came in a 3–0 win against Weymouth on 4 April.

At the end of the 2008–09 season, Jeffery was not offered a professional contract by West Ham and was released. Jeffery subsequently signed for Conference National club Grays Athletic. He was released from Grays in November, and went on to sign for Maldon Town. In early 2011, Jeffrey signed for Sevenoaks Town in the Kent League. In August, it was announced that he had signed for Isthmian League Division One North side Chatham Town.
