= Jordan Murphy (footballer) =

English footballer

Personal information
- Full name: Jordan Murphy
- Date of birth: 5 June 1996 (age 30)
- Place of birth: Birmingham, England
- Height: 1.80 m (5 ft 11 in)
- Position: Winger

Team information
- Current team: Worcester Raiders

Youth career
- Stourbridge

Senior career*
Years	Team	Apps	(Gls)
2014–2016	Walsall	2	(0)
2014–2015	→ Worcester City (loan)	8	(2)
2015	→ Kidderminster Harriers (loan)	7	(2)
2016	→ Worcester City (loan)	19	(3)
2016–2017	→ Worcester City (loan)	40	(7)
2017–2018	Telford United	10	(1)
2018–2020	Solihull Moors	5	(0)
2018–2019	→ Leamington (loan)	21	(2)
2019	→ Leamington (loan)	9	(1)
2019-2020	Halesowen	0	(0)
2020-	Worcester Raiders	0	(0)
- * Club domestic league appearances and goals as of 12 March 2026

Jordan Murphy (born 5 June 1996) is an English professional footballer who plays as a forward for Worcester Raiders.

== Playing career ==
=== Walsall ===
Murphy played youth football for Stourbridge, before being signed by League One side Walsall in September 2014. He went on loan to Worcester City, helping the Conference North side to knock out Football League side Coventry City and take Scunthorpe United to a replay. He made his "Saddlers" debut on 14 February, coming on for Michael Cain 80 minutes into a 1–0 defeat to Port Vale at the Bescot Stadium.

Murphy joined Kidderminster Harriers on a youth loan on 9 October 2015. On 16 November, this loan was extended to 9 January, but he was recalled on 3 December.

After making 2 appearances for Walsall, Murphy was then later released at the end of the 2015/16 campaign.

=== Kidderminster Harriers ===
On 9 October, Murphy penned a one-month loan deal with Kidderminster Harriers He scored on his Harriers debut, a 2–1 loss away at Macclesfield. He scored the only goal in a 1–0 home win against Woking, Harriers first win of the season coming after 18 games. The next home game, he assisted Harriers first goal in a 2–0 home win against Aldershot.

=== Solihull Moors ===
He signed for Solihull Moors in July 2018. On 24 December 2018, he joined Leamington on an initial one-month loan deal. The deal was later extended, but however, he was recalled on 25 April 2019. On 2 August 2019, Murphy went out on loan to Leamington once again until 31 January 2020.

== Statistics ==
As of match played 9 December 2017

Appearances and goals by club, season and competition
Club	Season	League			FA Cup		League Cup		Other		Total	
Club	Season	Division	Apps	Goals	Apps	Goals	Apps	Goals	Apps	Goals	Apps	Goals
Walsall	2014–15	League One	2	0	0	0	0	0	0	0	2	0
Worcester City (loan)	2014–15	Conference North	8	2	4	0	—		1 (Note: Appearances in the FA Trophy)	0	13	2
Kidderminster Harriers (loan)	2015–16	National League	7	2	0	0	—		0	0	7	2
Worcester City (loan)	2015–16	National League North	19	3	0	0	—		0	0	19	3
Worcester City (loan)	2016–17	National League North	40	7	0	0	—		1	0	41	7
Telford United	2017–18	National League North	10	1	2	0	—		1	0	13	1
Career total			86	15	6	0	0	0	3	0	95	15
