= Efe Echanomi =

Footballer (born 1986)

Personal information
- Date of birth: 27 September 1986 (age 40)
- Place of birth: Nigeria
- Position: Forward

Team information
- Current team: Waltham Forest

Senior career*
Years	Team	Apps	(Gls)
2004–2008	Leyton Orient	51	(8)
2008	Tiptree United		
2008	Grays Athletic	0	(0)
2011–?	Waltham Forest	7	(2)
- * Club domestic league appearances and goals as of 16:53, 22 December 2011 (UTC)

Efe Echanomi (born 27 September 1986) is a footballer who plays as a forward for Waltham Forest. He signed for Grays Athletic from Tiptree United in November 2008 before leaving in December.

== Career ==
Echanomi began his career playing for Leyton Orient, who were his first professional club, in late 2004 and had scored eight league goals in 34 appearances.

Echanomi spent 15 months injured due to having broken his leg in a freak accident before a home game against Chester City in December 2005. Warming up with some other players he caught his studs in the turn and suffered a horrendous injury. He made his long-awaited comeback as a substitute against Doncaster Rovers in April 2007.

He signed for Tiptree United on 29 August 2008 but left the club in November to sign for Grays Athletic on non-contract terms.

He joined Waltham Forest during mid-December 2011.

In 2015, Echanomi played in a charity match, appearing as part of Leyton Orient legends XI against Men United XI.
