= Solomon Shields =

English footballer (born 1989)

Personal information
- Full name: Solomon Joel Anthony Shields
- Date of birth: 14 October 1989 (age 37)
- Place of birth: Leyton, England
- Position: Midfielder

Team information
- Current team: St Albans City

Senior career*
Years	Team	Apps	(Gls)
2006–2009	Leyton Orient	1	(0)
2009	→ St Albans City (loan)	12	(1)
2009–2010	St Albans City	23	(2)
2010	Waltham Forest	0	(0)
2010–????	St Albans City		
- * Club domestic league appearances and goals as of 31 October 2010

Solomon Joel Anthony Shields (born 14 October 1989 in Leyton) is a football midfielder, who plays for St Albans City in the Southern League.

== Career ==
Shields made his debut for Orient on 5 May 2007 in the Football League One clash with Huddersfield Town which ended in a 3–1 defeat for Orient. On 3 February 2009, he joined St Albans City on loan for two months, having not made a first team appearance for Orient so far in the 2008–09 season, and was released by Orient on 4 May 2009.

During the summer of 2009 Shields spent two weeks on trial at Hayes & Yeading in an unsuccessful attempt to join the Conference Premier club, before re-signing with St Albans, this time on a permanent basis. After a successful start with his new club, Shields suffered an achilles tendon injury in late February 2010 whilst playing with friends, and spent months out of action.

In October 2010, Shields signed for Waltham Forest on a short-term deal.

Soon after he again joined St. Albans City, implementing himself into their new look side as starter in central midfield, partnering David Ijaha. Shields returned to first-team action with the saints in November 2010.
