= Bradley Gray =

English footballer

Personal information
- Date of birth: 5 July 1990 (age 36)
- Place of birth: Swindon, England
- Positions: Striker; midfielder

Team information
- Current team: Swindon Supermarine

Youth career
- Leyton Orient

Senior career*
Years	Team	Apps	(Gls)
2007–2009	Leyton Orient	0	(0)
2008	→ St Albans City (loan)	7	(2)
2008	→ Grays Athletic (loan)	1	(0)
2009	→ AFC Hornchurch (loan)	4	(0)
2009	→ Dulwich Hamlet (loan)	4	(0)
2009–2010	Salisbury City	43	(2)
2010–2011	Forest Green Rovers	15	(0)
2011–2012	Swindon Supermarine	30	(12)
2012–2014	Hungerford Town	34	(3)
2016–2017	North Leigh	11	(0)
2017	Evesham United		
2017–2019	Swindon Supermarine		
2019–	Cirencester Town		
- * Club domestic league appearances and goals as of 10 August 2020

Bradley Gray (born 5 July 1990) is an English semi-professional footballer who plays for Cirencester Town.

== Playing career ==
=== Leyton Orient ===
During his first season with Leyton Orient in 2007–08, Gray scored eight goals for the reserve and youth teams, and one for the first team in a 4–1 friendly victory against Spanish club CF San Rafael of Ibiza. He made his first-team debut in Leyton Orient's 4–2 Football League Trophy win against Southend United on 2 September 2008.

==== Loan spells ====
In October 2008, Gray moved to Grays Athletic on a work experience basis, while still playing for Leyton Orient reserves. During the 2007–08 season, he had played for St Albans City on a similar basis. He made his debut for Grays as a substitute on 1 November 2008. On 18 November, he returned to St Albans, again on work experience.

He gained further experience joining Isthmian Premier League side AFC Hornchurch. However, after four matches he moved again, this time to Dulwich Hamlet, of the Isthmian Division One South, making his debut on 14 February against Godalming Town. Gray still appeared for Orient reserves while playing for other clubs, but was released at the end of the season.

=== Salisbury City ===
On 29 July 2009, he moved to Salisbury City on a free transfer. He impressed early season and managed a run in the first team before twisting his ankle, ruling him out for six weeks. He came back to find himself used in squad rotation, helping the club out on the wing and up front.

At the end of the season, he signed a contract extension with the club despite their double demotion. However, a similar injury to that at the start of the previous season left him out of the beginning of the new season. He was released by mutual consent in October 2010.

=== Forest Green Rovers ===
On 7 December 2010, Gray signed for Conference National side Forest Green Rovers on a non-contract deal. On his debut, he made two assists in a 4–2 win at Bath City. In January, he was offered a contract until the end of the season. Gray left the club at the end of the season after not being offered a new deal.

=== Swindon Supermarine ===
In August 2011, Gray joined Southern Premier Division outfit Swindon Supermarine. He picked up a ligament injury just a few weeks into his time at the club and was ruled out for three months. After recovering from injury, Gray scored his first goal for the club in a 7–1 league defeat to Oxford City on 8 October 2011.

=== Hungerford Town ===
Gray signed for Hungerford Town in May 2012.

=== Evesham United and return to Swindon Supermarine ===
Gray was confirmed as signing for Evesham United on 7 February 2017 from North Leigh. He left the club to rejoin Swindon Supermarine in December 2017 due to work commitments.

In December 2019, Gray signed for Cirencester Town.

Gray is also a personal trainer in his home town of Swindon.
