= Loick Pires =

Portuguese footballer

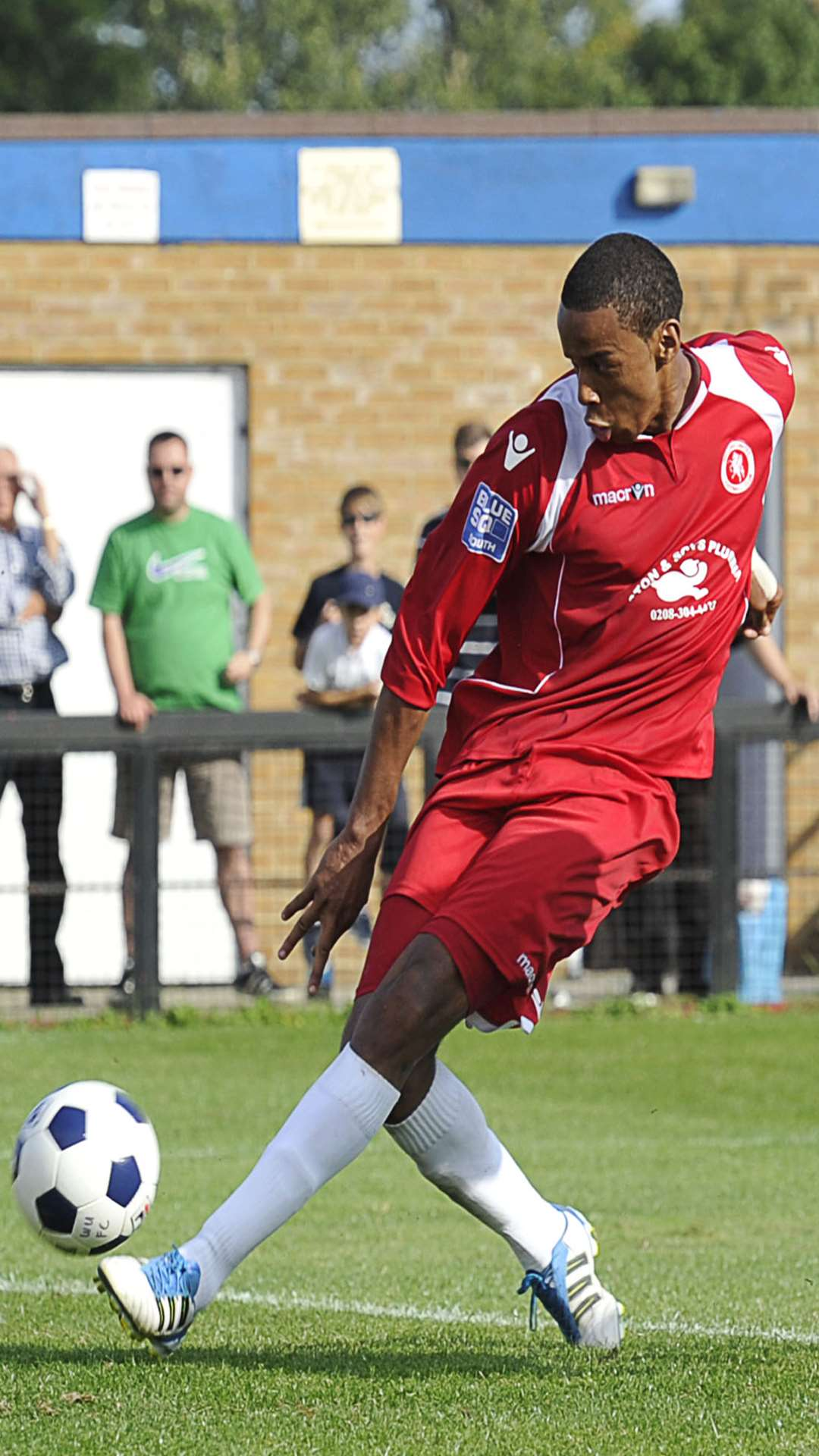
- Loick Pires in action for Welling United in 2012

Personal information
- Full name: Loick Muamba Barros Paiva Pires
- Date of birth: 20 November 1989 (age 36)
- Place of birth: Paris, France
- Height: 1.94 m (6 ft 4 in)
- Positions: Winger; striker

Youth career
- 2005–2006: Stoke City
- 2006–2008: Leyton Orient

Senior career*
Years	Team	Apps	(Gls)
2008–2010	Leyton Orient	15	(0)
2010–2012	Welling United	72	(29)
2012–2013	Woking	25	(3)
2013	→ Boreham Wood (loan)	9	(4)
2013–2014	Welling United	17	(4)
2014	→ Whitehawk (loan)	1	(0)
2014	Boreham Wood	15	(5)
2014	St Albans City	10	(2)
2014	→ Biggleswade Town (loan)	5	(2)
2014	→ Kingstonian (loan)	4	(1)
2015–2016	VCD Athletic	0	(0)
2020–2023	AFC Muswell Hill	37	(50)
- * Club domestic league appearances and goals as of 21:01, 12 December 2020 (UTC)

Loick Barros Paiva Pires (born 20 November 1989) is a Portuguese former professional footballer who last played for VCD Athletic. He played as a winger and centre forward.

== Career ==
Born in Sevran, Paris, to a Congolese mother and a Portuguese father before moving to London aged 7, Pires' previous clubs include Stoke City and Alexandra Park.

=== Leyton Orient ===
Pires had been a regular for both youth and reserves teams for Orient since joining in 2006 and earned his first full professional contract in April 2008. He made great strides in the 2008–09 season making a total of seven appearances in his first season as a professional, making his debut as a substitute for Orient in a home game against Doncaster Rovers on 19 April 2008. He was offered a new contract on 4 May 2009. On 11 May 2009, at the annual Leyton Orient awards dinner, Pires was awarded the inaugural Leyton Orient Community Player of the Year award for his outstanding contributions to the club's community sports programmes and youth schemes.

Despite scoring 10 goals in 12 reserve games, Pires was unable to find a regular place in the first team and was released by Orient's manager Russell Slade on 9 May 2010.

=== Welling United ===
On 19 July 2010, Pires signed for Conference South side Welling United. He suffered a knee injury on 10 August 2010 prior to the start of the Conference South season and was ruled out for four weeks. He was then ineligible to play for a further two weeks due to the club's transfer embargo. He scored a 30-yard free kick on his long-awaited debut against Woking on 18 September 2010, after coming on as a 75th minute sub. Pires and his teammates narrowly missed out on the play-offs but it was still deemed a successful season as the club had faced a points deduction and a transfer embargo. In total he made 27 appearances scoring nine goals. Pires also won the club's Goal of the Season award for his 30-yard spectacular volley against Bishop's Stortford. In his second season at Welling United, Pires played a key part in the club's run to the Conference South play-off final. In total he played 37 matches scoring 14 goals. He also won goal of the season for the second successive year as well as picking up the Players' player of the year award and being named in the Conference South team of the year. On 25 May 2012, Pires signed for newly promoted Woking on a one-year deal.

=== Woking ===
Pires scored his first league goal for Woking on 18 August 2012 in a 3–1 home win against Barrow also collecting the man of the match award. His next goal came on 15 September against Stockport County at Edgeley Park. The goal proved to be the winner and handed Woking their first away win of the season. Having scored three goals in 15 starts plus 11 substitute appearances and featuring on a sporadic basis for the first team since October, Pires was loaned out to Boreham Wood on 16 January 2013 for a month in a bid to recapture his form from the previous season. He returned to Woking for a couple of games in February before joining Boreham Wood on loan again until the end of the season. On 9 May 2013, Woking decided not to take up the option on his contract and he was released. Pires re-joined Welling United on 14 May 2013 on a one-year deal.

=== Welling United (second spell) ===
Pires made his second debut as a late substitute in the opening fixture of the 2013–14 season in a 2–1 defeat away against Wrexham. His first goal came against his old side Woking after he powerfully headed home a Joe Healy cross in a 4–2 away win for the Wings. He fractured his leg in a training ground incident in mid-October and was ruled out for four months. Upon his return from injury he went out on a month's loan to Whitehawk on 1 February to regain match fitness. Having made 73 starts plus 20 substitute appearances and scored 31 goals in his two spells in a Wings shirt, he left by mutual consent on 4 March to join Boreham Wood until the end of the 2013–14 season.

=== St Albans City ===
Pires was signed by St Albans City on 6 June 2014, and scored 2 goals on his debut in the Herts Cup but left the club in December, his contract cancelled by mutual consent. In the summer of 2015 he signed for VCD Athletic.

== Honours ==
Welling United

- Conference South Play-Offs Runner Up: 2011–12

Individual

- Welling United F.C. Goal of The Season: 2010–11
- Welling United F.C. Goal of The Season: 2011–12
- Welling United F.C. Players' Player of the Year: 2011–12
- Conference South Player of the Year: Runner Up: 2011–12
- Conference South Team of the Year: 2011–12
