= John Melligan =

Irish footballer

JJ Melligan
Personal information
- Full name: John Joseph Melligan
- Date of birth: 11 February 1982 (age 44)
- Place of birth: Dublin, Ireland
- Height: 1.78 m (5 ft 10 in)
- Position: Centre midfielder

Team information
- Current team: Hinckley AFC

Senior career*
Years	Team	Apps	(Gls)
2000–2004	Wolverhampton Wanderers	2	(0)
2001–2002	→ AFC Bournemouth (loan)	8	(0)
2002–2003	→ Kidderminster Harriers (loan)	29	(10)
2003	→ Kidderminster Harriers (loan)	5	(1)
2003–2004	→ Doncaster Rovers (loan)	21	(2)
2004–2007	Cheltenham Town	114	(15)
2007–2010	Leyton Orient	83	(6)
2010	Dundalk	15	(3)
2010–2011	Cheltenham Town	27	(0)
2011–2012	Solihull Moors	7	(0)
2013–2014	Wolverhampton Casuals		
2014–	Hinckley AFC		

International career
2003	Republic of Ireland U21	1	(0)
- * Club domestic league appearances and goals

John Joseph "JJ" Melligan (born 11 February 1982 in Whitehall, Dublin) is an Irish footballer who plays for Hinckley AFC.

== Career ==
Melligan first began playing for the Home Farm Club in Dublin before signing for Wolverhampton Wanderers in 1998. In 2001–02, Melligan went on loan to AFC Bournemouth and again at Kidderminster Harriers in 2002–03. After scoring 12 goals in 31 appearances he returned to Wolves and made two substitute appearances in (the then) Division One.

In 2003, he made a substitute appearance for the Republic of Ireland Under-21 team and went on to make 21 appearances on-loan at Doncaster Rovers in the 2003–04 season.

At the end of that season Melligan, signed for Cheltenham Town from Wolves for £25,000. He missed only four league games of the regular season in 2005–06, helping Cheltenham to win promotion from League 2.

On 6 June 2007, Melligan signed for Leyton Orient on a free transfer, and scored in only his second appearance for them. He left Leyton Orient in February 2010 after falling out with manager Geraint Williams following the 5–0 victory over Bristol Rovers. He signed a full-time contract for League of Ireland Premier side Dundalk in February 2010. Melligan left Dundalk just before they set off to play Grevenmacher, from Luxembourg, in the UEFA Europa League. In his short stint with Dundalk he scored three goals in fifteen appearances.

On 2 July 2010, Melligan re-signed for his former club, Cheltenham Town. Melligan had a clause in his contract allowing him to leave Dundalk if a Football League club came in for him so he was allowed to leave Dundalk for free. On 9 May 2011, Melligan was released from Cheltenham after his contract expired.

Melligan signed for Conference North side Solihull Moors in October 2011 after a successful trial. He scored on debut in the 3–2 FA Cup victory over Grantham on 15 October 2011.

Following a spell at Wolverhampton Casuals, Melligan followed manager Carl Abbott to newly formed club Hinckley AFC in the summer of 2014, where he was made club captain.

== Honours ==
Doncaster Rovers

- Football League Third Division: 2003–04
