= 2014 Football League One play-off final =

- The match took place at Wembley Stadium.
Leyton Orient	Rotherham United
2	2
- Rotherham United won 4–3 on penalties
- Date: 25 May 2014
- Venue: Wembley Stadium, London
- Referee: David Coote (Nottinghamshire)
- Attendance: 43,401

The 2014 Football League One play-off final was an association football match which was played on 25 May 2014 at Wembley Stadium, London, between Leyton Orient and Rotherham United to determine the third and final team to gain promotion from Football League One to the Football League Championship. The top two teams of the 2013–14 Football League One season gained automatic promotion to the Championship, while the teams placed from third to sixth place in the table partook in play-off semi-finals; the winners of these semi-finals competed for the final place for the 2014–15 season in the Championship.

Rotherham were aiming for back-to-back promotions while Leyton Orient had played in the third tier of English football since 2006. The game was refereed by David Coote in front of a Wembley crowd of more than 43,000 spectators. Leyton Orient took the lead in first half with a strike from Moses Odubajo and doubled their advantage five minutes later through Dean Cox. Alex Revell then pulled one back for Rotherham ten minutes into the second half before scoring his second with a strike from distance. The game ended 2–2 and went into extra time. No further goals were scored so the match was decided using a penalty shootout. Rotherham's Lee Frecklington saw his shot saved before his goalkeeper Adam Collin denied both Mathieu Baudry and Chris Dagnall to ensure a 4–3 victory.

Rotherham United ended the following season in 21st position in the Football League Championship, one place above the relegation zone. Leyton Orient finished their next season 23rd in League One, and were relegated to Football League Two for the 2015–16 season. Their manager Russell Slade resigned from the club in September 2014 with them in 17th position, to take over at Cardiff City.

== Route to the final ==
Football League One final table, leading positions
Pos	Team	Pld	W	D	L	GF	GA	GD	Pts
1	Wolverhampton Wanderers	46	31	10	5	89	31	+58	103
2	Brentford	46	28	10	8	72	43	+29	94
3	Leyton Orient	46	25	11	10	85	45	+40	86
4	Rotherham United	46	24	14	8	86	58	+28	86
5	Preston North End	46	23	16	7	72	46	+26	85
6	Peterborough United	46	23	5	18	72	58	+14	74

Leyton Orient finished the regular 2013–14 season in third place in Football League One, the third tier of the English football league system, one place ahead of Rotherham United. Both therefore missed out on the two automatic places for promotion to the Football League Championship and instead took part in the play-offs to determine the third promoted team. Leyton Orient finished eight points behind Brentford (who were promoted in second place) and seventeen behind league winners Wolverhampton Wanderers. Rotherham ended the season on the same number of points as Leyton Orient but with inferior goal difference.

Rotherham's opponents for the play-off semi-final was Preston North End and the first leg was played at Deepdale in Preston. Alex Revell scored for the visitors mid-way through the first half after picking the ball up around half-way and ran the length of Preston's half to score past Declan Rudd. A 25-yard (23 m) volley from Joe Garner four minutes into the second half to equalise the match; Rotherham manager Steve Evans described it as the "goal of the century". No further goals were scored and the match ended 1–1. The return leg took place at Rotherham's New York Stadium five days later. Paul Gallagher put Preston ahead from a free kick after sixteen minutes, but headed goals from Wes Thomas and Lee Frecklington made it 2–1 to Rotherham at half time. Kieran Agard scored mid-way through the second half and the match ended 3–1, with Rotherham progressing to the final with a 4–2 aggregate victory.

Leyton Orient faced Peterborough United in their play-off semi-final, with the first leg being played at London Road in Peterborough. Britt Assombalonga put the home team into the lead on 16 minutes after heading in a ball from Mark Little. Moses Odubajo equalised for Leyton Orient with 18 minutes of the game remaining, and the match ended 1–1. The return match was played three days later at Brisbane Road. After a goalless first half, Dean Cox put Leyton Orient ahead in the 60th minute with a volley after his initial shot was blocked. Chris Dagnall doubled the lead with two minutes of regular time remaining, before Conor Washington scored a consolation goal two minutes into stoppage time. The match ended 2–1 to Leyton Orient who qualified for the final with a 3–2 aggregate score.

== Match ==
=== Background ===
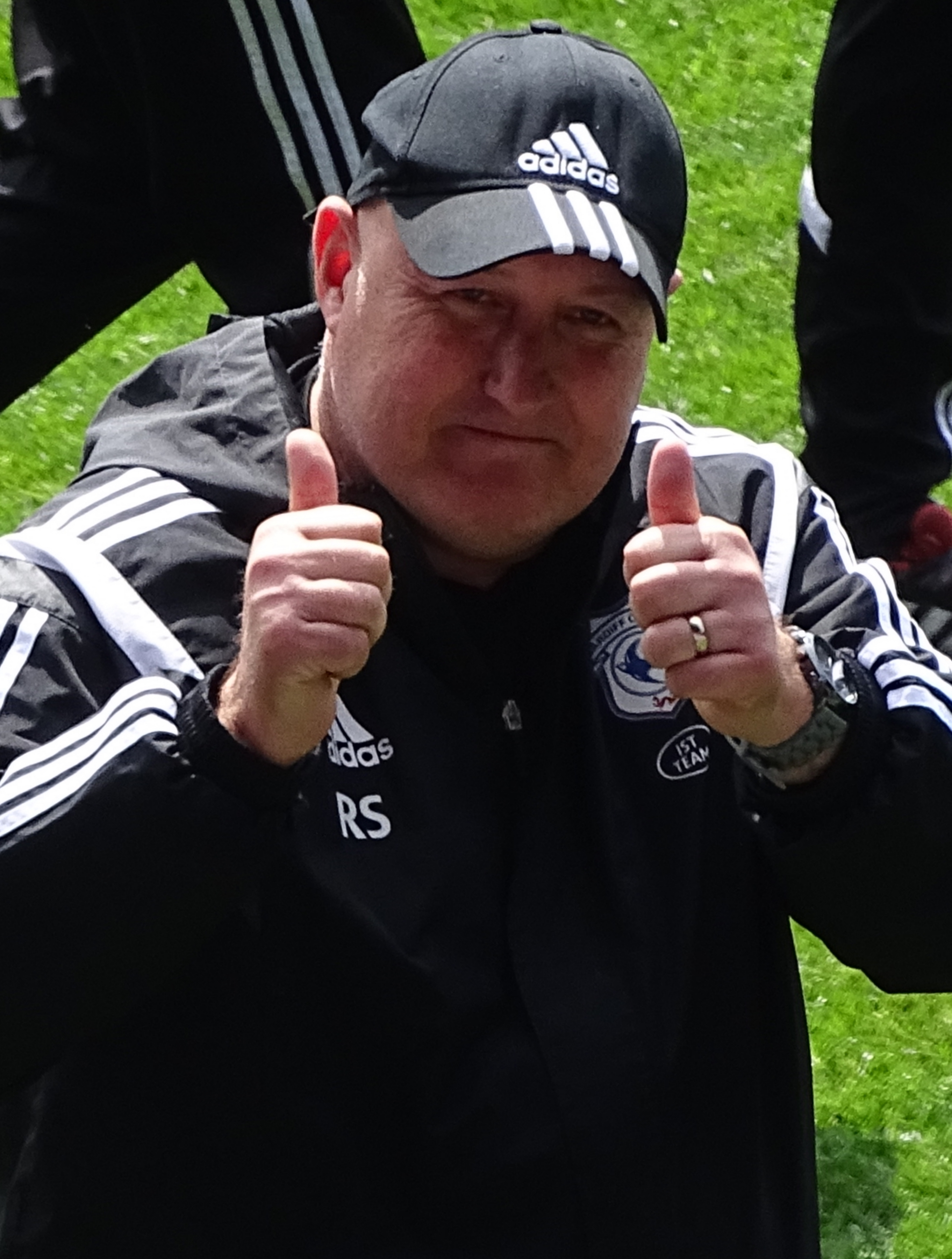
Russell Slade (pictured in 2016) had lost play-off finals in 2006 and 2007 as Grimsby Town and Yeovil Town manager respectively.

Rotherham United had featured in one play-off final prior to 2014, losing the 2010 Football League Two play-off final 3–2 to Dagenham & Redbridge at Wembley Stadium. This was Leyton Orient's fourth appearance in the final of the play-offs, although they had won just once, in the 1989 Football League Fourth Division play-off final which was played over two legs against Wrexham. Orient's two defeats came in the 1999 Football League Third Division play-off final against Scunthorpe United at the old Wembley Stadium and in the 2001 Football League Third Division play-off final against Blackpool at the Millennium Stadium. The Leyton Orient manager Russell Slade had play-off final experience when his Grimsby Town team were beaten by Cheltenham Town in the 2006 Football League Two play-off final at the Millennium Stadium. He also lost at Wembley Stadium in the following season's Football League One play-off final as manager of Yeovil Town, who lost 2–0 against Blackpool.

During the regular season, Rotherham had lost their away match at Leyton Orient 1–0 in October 2013 but won their home match 2–1. The two clubs had faced each other in the play-offs previously, with Leyton Orient prevailing in the 1998–99 fourth tier play-off semi-final after a penalty shootout. Leyton Orient had played in League One since gaining promotion from the third tier in the 2005–06 season, while Rotherham United were seeking back-to-back promotions, having finished the 2012–13 season in second place in League One. Agard was Rotherham's highest scorer with 25 goals, while Dave Mooney was the top marksman for Leyton Orient with 19, followed by Kevin Lisbie on 16.

The referee for the match was David Coote, representing the Nottinghamshire County Football Association. He had officiated Rotherham's 1–0 home win against Port Vale the previous month and had sent off Rotherham defender Richard Smallwood. He also took charge of Leyton Orient's draw at Wolverhampton Wanderers in December 2013. Coote was assisted by Adam Nunn and Michael Salisbury, with Mick Russell acting as the fourth official. Leyton Orient named a squad for the final which was unchanged from their second leg semi-final play-off victory over Peterborough United, while Rotherham made one change, with Richard Brindley replacing Daniel Rowe on the bench. Both managers considered their opposition team to be the favourites to win the match, while bookmakers Betfair gave marginally shorter odds on Rotherham than Leyton Orient to take the victory.

=== First half ===
The match kicked off in front of a Wembley Stadium crowd of 43,401 at around 3 p.m. An early free kick from Ben Pringle after Frecklington was fouled was cleared by Leyton Orient. A minute later, Revell was brought down in the Rotherham box by Nathan Clarke but no penalty was awarded. In the 8th minute, the Rotherham goalkeeper Adam Collin took a free kick which Craig Morgan headed down to Thomas whose shot was gathered by Jamie Jones in the Leyton Orient goal. Rotherham continued to send in high balls into their opposition's area but to no avail. On 31 minutes, Scott Cuthbert received the first yellow card of the game after a foul on Pringle. Three minutes later, Rotherham's Morgan was also booked for his foul on Lisbie. Dean Cox took the resulting free kick which Clarke headed out, only for Odubajo to strike the ball left-footed through a crowd of players into the roof of the Rotherham goal to put Leyton Orient into a 1–0 lead after 34 minutes. After scoring, he removed his shirt and was shown Leyton Orient's second yellow card of the afternoon for excessive celebration. Five minutes later, a long ball was won by Mooney who lost control of it on the turn which allowed James Tavernier to head it clear only for Odubajo to take control of the ball. He took it to the byline and passed it across the six-yard box to for Cox to tap it in at the far post, doubling Leyton Orient's lead. Mathieu Baudry's header went over the crossbar two minutes later, and in stoppage time, Pringle's strike from outside the area was too high. The half finished with Leyton Orient holding a 2–0 lead.

=== Second half ===
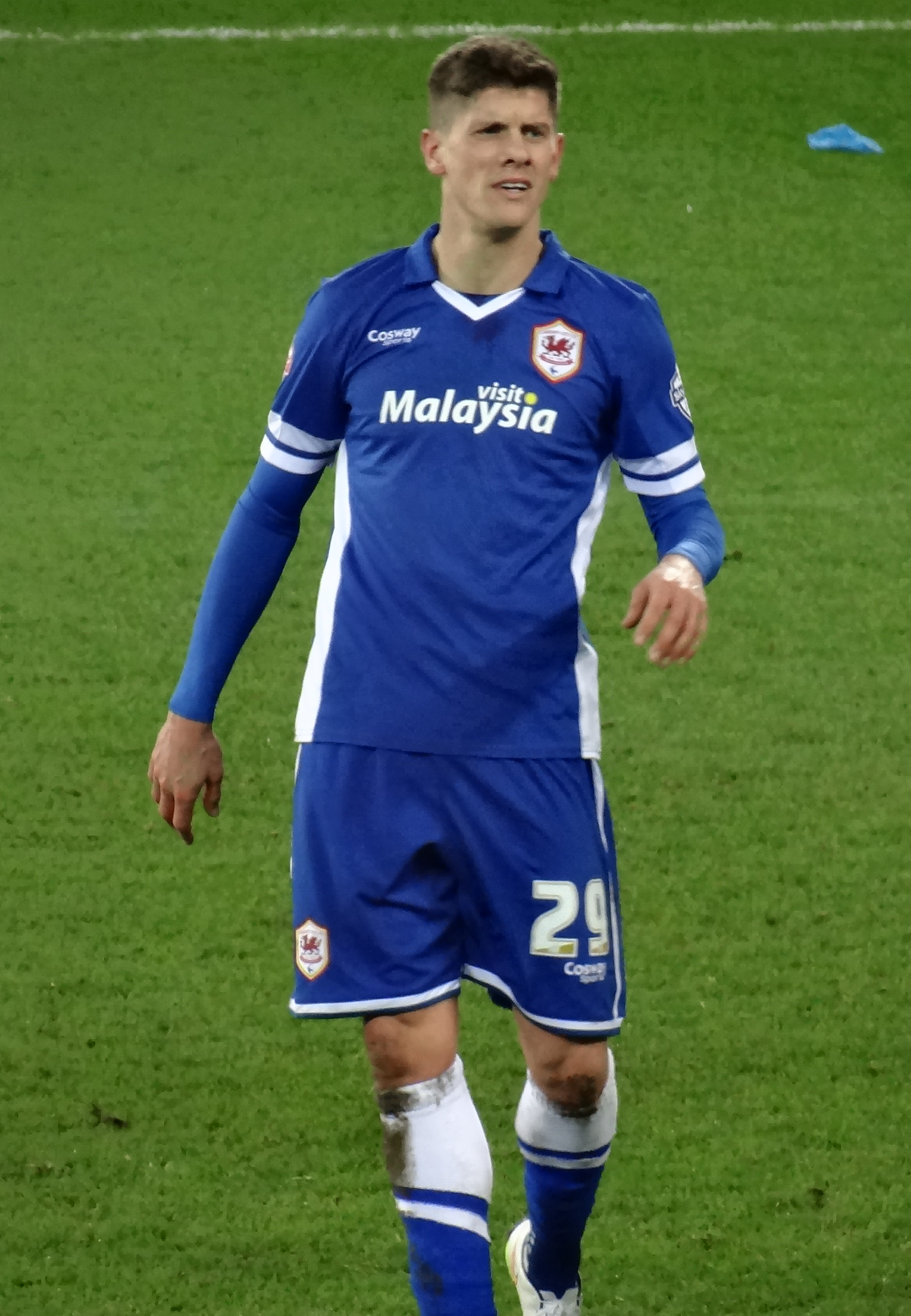
Alex Revell (pictured in 2015) scored two goals in five minutes for Rotherham United.

No changes were made to either side during the half-time break, although Rotherham's assistant manager Paul Raynor was sent to the stands. The first chance of the second half fell to Tavernier whose direct free kick from 25 yards (23 m) cleared the Leyton Orient wall but also the crossbar. In the 52nd minute, a similar free kick from Pringle flew over the Rotherham goal. Two minutes later, Rotherham made their first substitution of the game, with Brindley coming on to replace Thomas. On 54 minutes, a foul by Clarke saw a free kick awarded. Jones dropped the long ball and it fell to the former Leyton Orient player Revell who struck it into an empty net, halving Rotherham's deficit. Five minutes later, Revell doubled his tally from around 35 yards (32 m) and brought the game level at 2–2; receiving the ball knocked down by Lisbie from a Pringle pass, he struck what Jonathan Liew of The Daily Telegraph described as a "remarkable volley that looped over Jones and into the net". On 64 minutes, Clarke was shown a yellow card for a foul. In the 74th minute, Leyton Orient made their first substitution of the afternoon, Cox being replaced by Shaun Batt. Two minutes later, Dagnall came on for Lisbie who was injured in an earlier tackle, before Rotherham's Joe Skarz was substituted for Robert Milsom for Rotherham. Tavernier was booked in the 78th minute and three minutes later, Agard sliced his shot wide of the Leyton Orient goal. Pringle was then booked in the 87th minute for a foul on Batt before both Agard and Tavernier missed with headers. Into stoppage time, Leyton Orient had a series of corners, none of which came to anything and the full-time whistle was blown with the game tied at 2–2.

=== Extra time and penalties ===
Both teams remained unchanged from the end of regular time, and three minutes into the first half of extra time, Mooney became the fourth Leyton Orient player to be booked after a foul on Frecklington. Two minutes later, Rotherham were denied a third goal when Jones tipped over a Cuthbert deflection from a Revell shot. Haris Vučkić, Rotherham's third and final substitute, came on to replace Revell in the last minute of the first half of extra time. Mooney was taken off at the start of the second half of extra time, with John Lundstram coming on. In a half of few chances, both sides saw shots blocked but no clear opportunities to score, and extra time ended 2–2, sending the final to a penalty shootout.

Rotherham's Agard opened the shootout, scoring down the centre, with Lloyd James equalising with a strike into the top-right corner of the net. Frecklington's attempt was saved by Jones down to his left before Lundstram put Leyton Orient into a 2–1 lead with a high shot to the middle of the goal. Pringle then levelled the score before Clarke's strike into the bottom right-hand corner of the net once again saw Leyton Orient lead. Tavernier then scored in the top-left corner before Baudry saw his shot saved by Collins, with the score at 3–3 after four rounds of penalties. Smallwood's right-footed shot into the bottom-left corner put Rotherham ahead before Dagnall's strike down the centre was saved, and the penalty shootout ended 4–3 to Rotherham United.

=== Details ===
25 May 2014
15:00 BST

Leyton Orient	2–2 (a.e.t.)	Rotherham United
Odubajo 34'; Cox 39'	BBC report	Revell 55', 60'
Penalties
James (penalty scored); Lundstram (penalty scored); Clarke (penalty scored); Baudry (penalty missed); Dagnall (penalty missed)	3–4	(penalty scored) Agard; (penalty missed) Frecklington; (penalty scored) Pringle; (penalty scored) Tavernier; (penalty scored) Smallwood

Wembley Stadium, London
Attendance: 43,401
Referee: David Coote

Leyton Orient	Rotherham United

1	Jamie Jones
5	Scott Cuthbert	(yellow card) 31'
6	Mathieu Baudry
15	Nathan Clarke (c)	(yellow card) 64'
2	Elliot Omozusi
11	Moses Odubajo	(yellow card) 35'
4	Romain Vincelot
8	Lloyd James
7	Dean Cox		(substituted off) 74'
9	Kevin Lisbie		(substituted off) 76'
10	Dave Mooney	(yellow card) 93'	(substituted off) 106'
Substitutes:
12	Jake Larkins
3	Gary Sawyer
21	Marvin Bartley
24	John Lundstram		(substituted in) 106'
14	Shaun Batt		(substituted in) 74'
23	Chris Dagnall		(substituted in) 76'
25	Robbie Simpson
Manager:
Russell Slade

21	Adam Collin
27	James Tavernier	(yellow card) 78'
20	Craig Morgan (c)	(yellow card) 34'
4	Kári Árnason
3	Joe Skarz		(substituted off) 77'
22	Kieran Agard
8	Lee Frecklington
36	Richard Smallwood
18	Ben Pringle	(yellow card) 87'
26	Wes Thomas		(substituted off) 54'
9	Alex Revell		(substituted off) 105'
Substitutes:
1	Scott Shearer
2	Richard Brindley		(substituted in) 54'
5	Claude Davis
10	Michael O'Connor
15	Robert Milsom		(substituted in) 77'
28	Haris Vučkić		(substituted in) 105'
35	Tom Hitchcock
Manager:
Steve Evans

Assistant referees:
Adam Nunn
Michael Salisbury
Fourth official:
Mick Russell

Match rules:

- 90 minutes.
- 30 minutes of extra time if necessary.
- Penalty shoot-out if scores still level.
- Seven named substitutes.
- Maximum of three substitutions.

=== Statistics ===
Statistics
Statistic	Leyton Orient	Rotherham United
Total shots	9	16
Shots on target	2	7
Ball possession	55%	45%
Corner kicks	6	4
Fouls committed	20	11
Yellow cards	4	3
Red cards	0	0

== Post-match ==
Smallwood, on loan from Middlesbrough and scorer of the winning penalty, confessed that not only had he never visited Wembley Stadium prior to the final, he had "never taken a senior-level penalty before play-off final shootout winner". The Leyton Orient owner Barry Hearn stated that he would honour his promise to take his players to Las Vegas the week after the final, with Slade saying it could be "just the tonic they need". He went on to relate that Brentford had lost last year's final and then went on to win automatic promotion the following season and that would "be their model for success now". The Rotherham manager Evans dedicated the victory to two ill family members and recounted: "All season the boys have continued to fight adversity ... You need to retain that inner belief". Asked how he encouraged the Rotherham second half performance, Evans said: "I just spoke to them about what it meant to them, to their families, their children, their mums and dads – about how they would feel looking back on this day when they are grandads." Slade was named joint manager of the season for League One, along with Wolverhampton Wanderers' Kenny Jackett.

Rotherham United ended the following season in 21st position in the Football League Championship, one place and five points above the relegation zone. Leyton Orient finished their next season 23rd in League One, and were relegated to Football League Two for the 2015–16 season. Slade had resigned from the club in September 2014 with them in 17th position, to take over at Cardiff City after Leyton Orient had refused permission for the Welsh club to talk to him.

== See also ==
- 2014 Football League Championship play-off final
- 2014 Football League Two play-off final
