= 2013–14 Leyton Orient F.C. season =

Leyton Orient F.C.
2013–14 season
- Chairman: Barry Hearn
- Manager: Russell Slade
- Stadium: Brisbane Road
- League One: 3rd
- FA Cup: 3rd Round (Yeovil Town)
- League Cup: 2nd Round (Hull City)
- League Trophy: Southern Quarter-Final (Stevenage)
- Top goalscorer: League: Dave Mooney, 19; All: Dave Mooney, 21
Home colours	Away colours

The 2013–14 Leyton Orient F.C. season was the 115th season in the history of Leyton Orient Football Club, their 98th in the Football League, and eighth consecutive season in the third tier of the English football league system.

The club finished third in the league, reaching the end of the season promotion play-offs. They beat Peterborough United 3–2 on aggregate in the semi-final, but lost on penalties to Rotherham United in the final at Wembley Stadium on 25 May 2014, after drawing 2–2.

== Playing staff ==
After his return from a loan period at Port Vale, Anthony Griffith was still a member of the squad for the first pre-season friendly at Chelmsford City and played in that match, but subsequently signed permanently for Port Vale.

Marvin Bartley first joined Leyton Orient on loan from Burnley on 1 August 2013, and made 23 appearances for the club, scoring two goals, before signing permanently on 31 January 2014.

=== Five goalkeepers ===
First choice goalkeeper Jamie Jones suffered an injury prior to the league game at Gillingham on 26 December, and was initially replaced by Jake Larkins. Larkins was inexperienced, however, and manager Russell Slade decided to bring in a more experienced goalkeeper to take over. Eldin Jakupovic was initially given the number 31 shirt when he arrived on loan from Hull City on 7 January 2014. He made four appearances before being recalled by Hull as cover when Allan McGregor was suspended for three matches.

Orient then signed Ben Alnwick from Charlton Athletic, but he was sidelined with personal problems after one match. Subsequently, Shwan Jalal was signed on loan from AFC Bournemouth and played twice before Jakupovic returned to Orient on 13 February, this time being given the number 30 shirt. Alnwick was subsequently released by mutual consent, and Jalal also left, before Jakupovic was again recalled after Hull's McGregor was injured. This left Orient with Jones, Larkins and England U18 goalkeeper Charlie Grainger, and Jones resumed his position in the first team.

- Statistics include League, FA Cup, League Cup and Football League Trophy appearances and goals

No.	Name	Nat.	Place of birth	Date of birth	Position	Club apps.	Club goals	Int. caps	Int. goals	Previous club	Date joined
1	Jamie Jones	ENG	Kirkby	18 February 1989 (age 37)	GK	179	0	0	0	Everton	30 June 2008
2	Elliott Omozusi	ENG	Hackney	15 December 1988 (age 37)	DF	115	0	0	0	Leyton Orient	21 January 2013
3	Gary Sawyer	ENG	Bideford	5 July 1985 (age 40)	DF	70	1	0	0	Bristol Rovers	12 May 2012
4	Romain Vincelot	FRA	Poitiers	29 October 1985 (age 40)	DF	63	1	0	0	Brighton & Hove Albion	7 February 2013
5	Scott Cuthbert	SCO	Alexandria	15 June 1987 (age 38)	DF	116	4	0	0	Swindon Town	3 June 2011
6	Mathieu Baudry	FRA	Sainte-Adresse	24 February 1988 (age 38)	DF	81	6	0	0	AFC Bournemouth	28 June 2012
7	Dean Cox	ENG	Cuckfield	12 August 1987 (age 38)	MF	210	45	0	0	Brighton & Hove Albion	2 June 2010
8	Lloyd James	WAL	Bristol	16 February 1988 (age 38)	MF	92	5	0	0	Colchester United	18 July 2012
9	Kevin Lisbie	JAM	Hackney	17 October 1978 (age 47)	FW	117	46	10	2	Ipswich Town	9 September 2011
10	Dave Mooney	IRE	Dublin	30 October 1984 (age 41)	FW	132	40	0	0	Reading	23 July 2011
11	Moses Odubajo	ENG	Greenwich	28 July 1993 (age 32)	MF	116	16	0	0	Trainee	17 September 2010
12	Jake Larkins	ENG	Dagenham	11 January 1994 (age 32)	GK	4	0	0	0	West Ham United	6 June 2013
14	Shaun Batt	ENG	Harlow	22 February 1987 (age 39)	FW	56	12	0	0	Millwall	24 June 2013
15	Nathan Clarke	ENG	Halifax	30 July 1983 (age 42)	DF	92	2	0	0	Huddersfield Town	18 July 2012
16	Harry Lee	ENG	Hackney	20 March 1995 (age 31)	MF	3	0	0	0	Trainee	9 October 2012
17	De'Reece Vanderhyde	ENG	London	5 April 1995 (age 31)	DF	0	0	0	0	Trainee	9 October 2012
18	Jack Sherratt	ENG	Stoke-on-Trent	29 July 1993 (age 32)	MF	0	0	0	0	Kidsgrove Athletic	1 July 2013
19	Yohann Lasimant	FRA	Besançon	4 September 1989 (age 36)	FW	18	2	0	0	AEL	16 July 2013
20	Johnny Gorman	NIR	Sheffield	26 October 1992 (age 33)	MF	7	0	0	0	Wolverhampton Wanderers	1 August 2013
21	Marvin Bartley	ENG	Reading	4 July 1986 (age 39)	MF	29	2	0	0	Burnley	31 January 2014
23	Chris Dagnall	ENG	Liverpool	15 April 1986 (age 40)	FW	22	7	0	0	Barnsley	16 January 2014
24	John Lundstram	ENG	Liverpool	18 February 1994 (age 32)	MF	9	0	0	0	Everton (loan)	27 March 2014
25	Robbie Simpson	ENG	Poole	15 March 1985 (age 41)	FW	16	0	0	0	Oldham Athletic	11 November 2013
26	Alex Finney	ENG	Huddersfield	6 June 1996 (age 29)	DF	0	0	0	0	Trainee	7 December 2013
27	Sam Ling	ENG	Broxbourne	17 December 1996 (age 29)	DF	0	0	0	0	Trainee	7 December 2013
28	Charlie Grainger	ENG	Enfield	31 July 1996 (age 29)	GK	0	0	0	0	Trainee	14 August 2012
29	Jamie Ness	SCO	Irvine	2 March 1991 (age 35)	MF	14	1	0	0	Stoke City (loan)	3 January 2014
Players who have appeared in Leyton Orient's squad this season but who have left the club:
	Ben Alnwick	ENG	Prudhoe	1 January 1987 (age 39)	GK	9	0	0	0	Charlton Athletic	31 January 2014
	Shaq Coulthirst	ENG	Hackney	2 November 1994 (age 31)	FW	2	1	0	0	Tottenham Hotspur (loan)	3 January 2014
	Eldin Jakupović	SWI	Prijedor	2 October 1984 (age 41)	GK	13	0	1	0	Hull City (loan)	7 January 2014
	Shwan Jalal	ENG	Baghdad	14 August 1983 (age 42)	GK	2	0	0	0	AFC Bournemouth (loan)	7 February 2014
	Jamar Loza	JAM	Kingston	10 May 1994 (age 32)	FW	3	0	0	0	Norwich City (loan)	6 January 2014
	Jayden Stockley	ENG	Poole	15 September 1993 (age 32)	FW	11	1	0	0	AFC Bournemouth (loan)	2 September 2013
	Frankie Sutherland	IRE	Hillingdon	6 December 1993 (age 32)	MF	1	0	0	0	Queens Park Rangers (loan)	21 October 2013
	Josh Wright	ENG	Bethnal Green	6 November 1989 (age 36)	MF	2	0	0	0	Millwall (loan)	19 November 2013

== 2013–14 squad statistics ==
As of 25 May 2014

- Figures in brackets indicate appearances as a substitute
- Players in italics are loan players

No.	Pos.	Name	League		FA Cup		League Cup		Other		Total		Discipline	
No.	Pos.	Name	Apps	Goals	Apps	Goals	Apps	Goals	Apps	Goals	Apps	Goals	Yellow card	Red card
1	GK	(England) Jamie Jones	28	0	1	0	2	0	6	0	37	0	0	0
2	DF	(England) Elliott Omozusi	38 (1)	0	3	0	2	0	6	0	49 (1)	0	8	0
3	DF	(England) Gary Sawyer	16 (6)	0	3	0	1	0	2	0	22 (6)	0	4	0
4	DF	(France) Romain Vincelot	38 (1)	0	2	0	2	0	5	0	47 (1)	0	13	1
5	DF	(Scotland) Scott Cuthbert	44	3	2	0	2	0	5 (1)	0	53 (1)	3	9	0
6	DF	(France) Mathieu Baudry	38 (1)	2	2	0	1	0	4	0	45 (1)	2	8	0
7	MF	(England) Dean Cox	44 (1)	12	2 (1)	2	2	1	6 (2)	2	52 (4)	17	7	0
8	MF	(Wales) Lloyd James	38 (4)	3	2 (1)	1	2	0	5 (1)	1	47 (6)	5	8	0
9	FW	(Jamaica) Kevin Lisbie	35 (4)	16	0	0	2	2	3 (1)	0	40 (5)	18	4	0
10	FW	(Republic of Ireland) Dave Mooney	34 (4)	19	2	1	2	0	4 (2)	1	42 (6)	21	2	1
11	MF	(England) Moses Odubajo	46	10	2 (1)	0	2	0	6	2	56 (1)	12	8	0
12	GK	(England) Jake Larkins	2	0	2	0	0	0	0	0	4	0	0	0
14	FW	(England) Shaun Batt	7 (28)	4	2	2	0	0	3 (3)	3	12 (31)	9	5	0
15	DF	(England) Nathan Clarke	46	2	2	0	1	0	5	0	54	2	7	0
16	MF	(England) Harry Lee	0	0	0 (2)	0	0	0	0	0	0 (2)	0	0	0
17	DF	(England) De'Reece Vanderhyde	0	0	0	0	0	0	0	0	0	0	0	0
18	MF	(England) Jack Sherratt	0	0	0	0	0	0	0	0	0	0	0	0
19	FW	(France) Yohann Lasimant	1 (10)	2	3	0	0 (2)	0	1 (1)	0	5 (13)	2	2	0
20	MF	(Northern Ireland) Johnny Gorman	0 (2)	0	1 (2)	0	0 (1)	0	1	0	2 (5)	0	0	0
21	MF	(England) Marvin Bartley	9 (16)	2	0	0	1	0	2 (1)	0	12 (17)	2	3	0
23	FW	(England) Chris Dagnall	11 (9)	6	0	0	0	0	0 (2)	1	11 (11)	7	3	0
24	MF	(England) John Lundstram	6 (1)	0	0	0	0	0	1 (1)	0	7 (2)	0	0	0
25	FW	(England) Robbie Simpson	5 (9)	0	0 (1)	0	0	0	0 (1)	0	5 (11)	0	0	0
26	DF	(England) Alex Finney	0	0	0	0	0	0	0	0	0	0	0	0
27	DF	(England) Sam Ling	0	0	0	0	0	0	0	0	0	0	0	0
28	GK	(England) Charlie Grainger	0	0	0	0	0	0	0	0	0	0	0	0
29	MF	(Scotland) Jamie Ness	3 (10)	1	1	0	0	0	0	0	4 (10)	1	1	0
Players who have appeared in Leyton Orient's squad this season but who have left the club:
22	FW	(England) Jayden Stockley	0 (8)	1	0	0	0	0	3	0	3 (8)	1	0	0
22	FW	(Jamaica) Jamar Loza	1 (2)	0	0	0	0	0	0	0	1 (2)	0	0	0
24	MF	(Republic of Ireland) Frankie Sutherland	0	0	1	0	0	0	0	0	1	0	0	0
24	MF	(England) Josh Wright	0 (2)	0	0	0	0	0	0	0	0 (2)	0	0	0
24	GK	(England) Shwan Jalal	2	0	0	0	0	0	0	0	2	0	0	0
30	FW	(England) Shaq Coulthirst	0 (1)	1	0 (1)	0	0	0	0	0	0 (2)	1	1	0
31	GK	(England) Ben Alnwick	1	0	0	0	0	0	0	0	1	0	0	0
31/30	GK	(Switzerland) Eldin Jakupović	13	0	0	0	0	0	0	0	13	0	0	0

=== Top scorers ===
Place	Position	Name	League One	FA Cup	League Cup	Other	Total
1	FW	Dave Mooney	19	1	0	1	21
2	FW	Kevin Lisbie	16	0	2	0	18
3	MF	Dean Cox	12	2	1	2	17
4	MF	Moses Odubajo	10	0	0	2	12
5	FW	Shaun Batt	4	2	0	3	9
6	FW	Chris Dagnall	6	0	0	1	7
7	MF	Lloyd James	3	1	0	1	5
8	DF	Scott Cuthbert	3	0	0	0	3
9=	MF	Marvin Bartley	2	0	0	0	2
9=	DF	Mathieu Baudry	2	0	0	0	2
9=	DF	Nathan Clarke	2	0	0	0	2
9=	FW	Yohann Lasimant	2	0	0	0	2
13=	FW	Shaq Coulthirst	1	0	0	0	1
13=	MF	Jamie Ness	1	0	0	0	1
13=	FW	Jayden Stockley	1	0	0	0	1

== Results ==
=== Pre-season friendlies ===
8 July 2013	Chelmsford City	0–7	Leyton Orient	Chelmsford
19:30		Report	Batt 56', 58'; Lisbie 60', 89'; Cox 70'; Lasimant 78', 88'	Stadium: Melbourne Stadium; Attendance: 752

12 July 2013	Welling United	1–4	Leyton Orient	Welling
19:30	Pires 49'	Report	Mooney 4', 16'; Cox 29'; Batt 33'	Stadium: Park View Road

17 July 2013	Tamworth	1–1	Leyton Orient	Tamworth
19:30	Harris 78'	Report	Odubajo 6'	Stadium: The Lamb Ground; Attendance: 409

20 July 2013	Southend United	3–3	Leyton Orient	Boots & Laces, Southend
	Dan Fitchett 3'; Joshua Rees 70'; Carrington 83'	Report	Lisbie 16', 55'; Mooney 65'	Attendance: 0

24 July 2013	Leyton Orient	2–1	New York Cosmos	Leyton
19:30	Mooney 23'; Lisbie 59'	Report	Guenzatti 74'	Stadium: Brisbane Road; Attendance: 2,004; Referee: Stuart Attwell

26 July 2013	St Albans City	2–1	Leyton Orient XI	St Albans
19:30	Ryan Ashe 40'; George Ngoyi 67'	Report	Harrison Georgiou 90'	Stadium: Clarence Park

30 July 2013	Leyton Orient	4–4	Arsenal XI	Leyton
19:30	Cuthbert 4'; Lisbie 5'; Mooney 43'; Gorman 47'	Report	Silva 11', 42'; Akpom 53'; Boateng 90'	Stadium: Brisbane Road; Attendance: 3,413; Referee: Mick Russell

=== League One ===
3 August 2013	Carlisle United	1–5	Leyton Orient	Carlisle
15:00	Cuthbert 43' (pen.)	Report	Lisbie 22'; Cuthbert 37'; Mooney 70'; Cox 81', 85'	Stadium: Brunton Park; Attendance: 4,951

10 August 2013	Leyton Orient	3–0	Shrewsbury Town	Leyton
15:00	Mooney 57', 63'; Odubajo 90'	Report		Stadium: Brisbane Road; Attendance: 4,414; Referee: Miller

17 August 2013	Stevenage	0–1	Leyton Orient	Stevenage
15:00		Report	Lisbie 29'	Stadium: Broadhall Way; Attendance: 3,262; Referee: Malone

24 August 2013	Leyton Orient	2–0	Crewe Alexandra	Leyton
15:00	Odubajo 7'; Mooney 37' (pen.)	Report		Stadium: Brisbane Road; Attendance: 4,455; Referee: Keith Stroud

31 August 2013	Colchester United	1–2	Leyton Orient	Colchester
15:00	Ibehre 35'	Report	Mooney 13'; Lisbie 63'	Stadium: Colchester Community Stadium; Attendance: 5,056; Referee: Woolmer

14 September 2013	Leyton Orient	3–2	Port Vale	Leyton
15:00	Mooney 24', 45'; Lisbie 88'	Report	Dodds 21'; Myrie-Williams 54'	Stadium: Brisbane Road; Attendance: 4,888; Referee: Russell

17 September 2013	Leyton Orient	5–1	Notts County	Leyton
19:45	Lisbie 28', 45'; Cox 56'; Batt 80'; Stockley 84'	Report	Haynes 71'	Stadium: Brisbane Road; Attendance: 4,092; Referee: Lewis

23 September 2013	Brentford	0–2	Leyton Orient	Brentford
19:45		Report	Mooney 65' (pen.); Batt 85'	Stadium: Griffin Park; Attendance: 6,439; Referee: Linington

28 September 2013	Leyton Orient	1–1	Walsall	Leyton
15:00	Mooney 38'	Report	Westcarr 71'	Stadium: Brisbane Road; Attendance: 5,429; Referee: Scott

5 October 2013	Oldham Athletic	1–1	Leyton Orient	Oldham
15:00	MacDonald 36'	Report	Batt 66'	Stadium: Boundary Park; Attendance: 4,062; Referee: Kevin Wright

12 October 2013	Leyton Orient	2–1	Milton Keynes Dons	Leyton
15:00	Odubajo 42'; Lisbie 67'	Report	Bamford 30'	Stadium: Brisbane Road; Attendance: 6,359; Referee: Iain Williamson

19 October 2013	Tranmere Rovers	0–4	Leyton Orient	Tranmere
15:00		Report	Lisbie 22', 61'; Cox 78'; Batt 85'	Stadium: Prenton Park; Attendance: 4,313; Referee: Richard Clark

22 October 2013	Coventry City	3–1	Leyton Orient	Northampton
19:45	Baker 10'; Moussa 67'; Clarke 77'	Report	Lasimant 90'	Stadium: Sixfields Stadium; Attendance: 2,386; Referee: James Adcock

26 October 2013	Leyton Orient	1–0	Rotherham United	Leyton
15:00	Lisbie 29'	Report		Stadium: Brisbane Road; Attendance: 5,609; Referee: Darren Sheldrake

2 November 2013	Peterborough United	1–3	Leyton Orient	Peterborough
15:00	Rowe 26'	Report	Mooney 39', 58'; Cox 49'	Stadium: London Road; Attendance: 10,026; Referee: Mark Heywood

16 November 2013	Leyton Orient	0–1	Preston North End	Leyton
15:00		Report	Garner 33'	Stadium: Brisbane Road; Attendance: 7,123; Referee: Keith Hill

23 November 2013	Swindon Town	1–3	Leyton Orient	Swindon
15:00	Ajose 23'	Report	Mooney 24'; Odubajo 40', 46'	Stadium: County Ground; Attendance: 8,634; Referee: Chris Sarginson

26 November 2013	Bristol City	2–2	Leyton Orient	Bristol
19:45	Baldock 58'; Cuthbert 73' (o.g.)	Report	Mooney 23'; Cox 70'	Stadium: Ashton Gate Stadium; Attendance: 10,659; Referee: Andy Davies

30 November 2013	Leyton Orient	1–1	Sheffield United	Leyton
15:00	Cox 82'	Report	Coady 67'	Stadium: Brisbane Road; Attendance: 6,856; Referee: Darren Deadman

14 December 2013	Bradford City	1–1	Leyton Orient	Bradford
15:00	Wells 90'	Report	James 45'	Stadium: Valley Parade; Attendance: 14,292; Referee: Mark Heywood

21 December 2013	Leyton Orient	2–3	Crawley Town	Leyton
15:00	Odubajo 14'; Bartley 86'	Report	Alexander 36'; Drury 45'; Adams 76'	Stadium: Brisbane Road; Attendance: 4,855; Referee: Trevor Kettle

26 December 2013	Gillingham	1–2	Leyton Orient	Gillingham
13:30	Akinfenwa 4'	Report	Bartley 70'; Lasimant 90'	Stadium: Priestfield Stadium; Attendance: 8,613; Referee: Fred Graham

29 December 2013	Wolverhampton Wanderers	1–1	Leyton Orient	Wolverhampton
15:00	Ebanks-Landell 5'	Report	Baudry 60'	Stadium: Molineux; Attendance: 28,598; Referee: David Coote

7 January 2014	Shrewsbury Town	0–2	Leyton Orient	Shrewsbury
19:45		Report	Odubajo 28'; Mkandawire 87' (o.g.)	Stadium: New Meadow; Attendance: 4,194; Referee: Scott Mathieson

11 January 2014	Leyton Orient	4–0	Carlisle United	Leyton
15:00	Cuthbert 43'; Ness 47'; Lisbie 66'; Coulthirst 90+5'	Report		Stadium: Brisbane Road; Attendance: 5,279; Referee: Graham Horwood

18 January 2014	Crewe Alexandra	1–2	Leyton Orient	Crewe
15:00	Moore 53'	Report	Dagnall 60', 67'	Stadium: Alexandra Stadium; Attendance: 4,830; Referee: Andy Woolmer

28 January 2014	Leyton Orient	2–0	Coventry City	Leyton
19:45	Cox 57'; Mooney 81'	Report		Stadium: Brisbane Road; Attendance: 5,077; Referee: Michael Bull

1 February 2014	Rotherham United	2–1	Leyton Orient	Rotherham
15:00	Thomas 10'; Revell 90+5'	Report	Odubajo 76'	Stadium: New York Stadium; Attendance: 8,604; Referee: Kevin Wright

8 February 2014	Leyton Orient	1–2	Peterborough United	Leyton
15:00	Mooney 70'	Report	Assombalonga 88'; Rowe 90'	Stadium: Brisbane Road; Attendance: 6,717; Referee: Lee Probert

11 February 2014	Leyton Orient	1–3	Bristol City	Leyton
19:45	Lisbie 44'	Report	Baldock 3'; Barnett 12'; Flint 76'	Stadium: Brisbane Road; Attendance: 3,928; Referee: Carl Berry

15 February 2014	Preston North End	1–1	Leyton Orient	Preston
15:00	Garner 64' (pen.)	Report	Baudry 44'	Stadium: Deepdale; Attendance: 13,440; Referee: Dean Whitestone

18 February 2014	Leyton Orient	2–0	Stevenage	Leyton
19:45	Odubajo 14'; Dagnall 23'	Report		Stadium: Brisbane Road; Attendance: 4,171; Referee: Trevor Kettle

22 February 2014	Leyton Orient	2–0	Swindon Town	Leyton
15:00	James 42' (pen.), 52' (pen.)	Report		Stadium: Brisbane Road; Attendance: 5,091; Referee: Gavin Ward

1 March 2014	Leyton Orient	2–1	Colchester United	Leyton
15:00	Mooney 21'; Odubajo 83'	Report	Bean 79'	Stadium: Brisbane Road; Attendance: 6,323; Referee: David Webb

8 March 2014	Notts County	0–0	Leyton Orient	Nottingham
15:00		Report		Stadium: Meadow Lane; Attendance: 4,680; Referee: Graham Salisbury

11 March 2014	Port Vale	0–2	Leyton Orient	Stoke-on-Trent
19:45		Report	Cox 41'; Clarke 58'	Stadium: Vale Park; Attendance: 4,235; Referee: Jeremy Simpson

15 March 2014	Leyton Orient	0–1	Brentford	Leyton
12:15		Report	Trotta 45'	Stadium: Brisbane Road; Attendance: 8,335; Referee: Bobby Madley

22 March 2014	Walsall	1–1	Leyton Orient	Walsall
15:00	Downing 14'	Report	Clarke 78'	Stadium: Bescot Stadium; Attendance: 5,779; Referee: Tim Robinson

25 March 2014	Leyton Orient	1–1	Oldham Athletic	Leyton
19:45	Cuthbert 45'	Report	Smith 90'	Stadium: Brisbane Road; Attendance: 3,645; Referee: Lee Collins

29 March 2014	Leyton Orient	0–1	Bradford City	Leyton
15:00		Report	McLean 27'	Stadium: Brisbane Road; Attendance: 5,165; Referee: David Phillips

5 April 2014	Sheffield United	1–1	Leyton Orient	Sheffield
15:00	Murphy 63'	Report	Cox 41'	Stadium: Bramall Lane; Attendance: 16,809; Referee: Michael Jones

12 April 2014	Leyton Orient	5–1	Gillingham	Leyton
15:07	Mooney 5', 35'; Cox 9'; Lisbie 35'; Dagnall 78'	Report	Fagan 82'	Stadium: Brisbane Road; Attendance: 5,128; Referee: Carl Boyeson

18 April 2014	Crawley Town	2–1	Leyton Orient	Crawley
15:00	Edwards 26'; Drury 70'	Report	Dagnall 40'	Stadium: Broadfield Stadium; Attendance: 4,387; Referee: Mick Russell

21 April 2014	Leyton Orient	1–3	Wolverhampton Wanderers	Leyton
12:15	Cox 48'	Report	Stearman 17'; Sako 32'; Henry 90+5'	Stadium: Brisbane Road; Attendance: 8,161; Referee: Neil Swarbrick

26 April 2014	Leyton Orient	2–0	Tranmere Rovers	Leyton
15:00	Lisbie 44'; Dagnall 77'	Report		Stadium: Brisbane Road; Attendance: 4,923; Referee: Darren Sheldrake

3 May 2014	Milton Keynes Dons	1–3	Leyton Orient	Milton Keynes
15:00	Hall 79'	Report	Lisbie 17', 45'; Mooney 56'	Stadium: Stadium MK; Attendance: 9,965; Referee: Steve Martin

=== League One play-offs ===
==== Semi-final ====
10 May 2013	Peterborough United	1–1	Leyton Orient	Peterborough
12:15	Assombalonga 16'	Report	Odubajo 72'	Stadium: London Road; Attendance: 9,519; Referee: Graham Salisbury

13 May 2014	Leyton Orient	2–1	Peterborough United	Leyton
19:45	Cox 60'; Dagnall 88'	Report	Washington 90+1'	Stadium: Brisbane Road; Attendance: 8,545; Referee: Mick Russell

==== Final ====
25 May 2014	Leyton Orient	2–2 (3–4 p)	Rotherham United	London
15:00	Odubajo 34'; Cox 39'	Report	Revell 55', 60'	Stadium: Wembley Stadium; Attendance: 43,401; Referee: David Coote
	Penalties
	James (penalty scored); Lundstram (penalty scored); Clarke (penalty scored); Baudry (penalty missed); Dagnall (penalty missed)		Agard (penalty scored); Frecklington (penalty missed); Pringle (penalty scored); Tavernier (penalty scored); Smallwood (penalty scored)

=== Results by round ===
Round	1	2	3	4	5	6	7	8	9	10	11	12	13	14	15	16	17	18	19	20	21	22	23	24	25	26	27	28	29	30	31	32	33	34	35	36	37	38	39	40	41	42	43	44	45	46
Ground	A	H	A	H	A	H	H	A	H	A	H	A	A	H	A	H	A	A	H	A	H	A	A	A	H	A	H	A	H	H	A	H	H	H	A	A	H	A	H	H	A	H	A	H	H	A
Result	W	W	W	W	W	W	W	W	D	D	W	W	L	W	W	L	W	D	D	D	L	W	D	W	W	W	W	L	L	L	D	W	W	W	D	W	L	D	D	L	D	W	L	L	W	W
Position	1	1	1	1	1	1	1	1	1	1	1	1	1	1	1	2	1	2	1	1	1	1	2	2	2	1	2	3	3	3	3	2	1	2	2	2	3	3	3	3	4	3	3	5	4	3

Updated to match(es) played on 3 May 2014. Source: see below
A = Away; H = Home; W = Win; D = Draw; L = Loss

=== FA Cup ===
9 November 2013 1	Leyton Orient	5–2	Southport	Leyton
15:00	Batt 3', 56'; Mooney 9'; James 45'; Cox 67'	Report	George 21'; Flynn 87'	Stadium: Brisbane Road; Attendance: 3,014; Referee: Kevin Johnson

7 December 2013 2	Leyton Orient	1–0	Walsall	Leyton
15:00	Cox 41'	Report		Stadium: Brisbane Road; Attendance: 2,604; Referee: Kevin Friend

4 January 2014 3	Yeovil Town	4–0	Leyton Orient	Yeovil
15:00	Hayter 12', 60'; Grant 49'; Moore 90'	Report		Stadium: Huish Park; Attendance: 3,667; Referee: Oliver Langford

=== League Cup ===
6 August 2013 1	Leyton Orient	3–2	Coventry City	Leyton
19:45	Lisbie 26', 89'; Cox 37'	Report	Baker 22'; Moussa 59'	Stadium: Brisbane Road; Attendance: 2,871; Referee: Whitestone

27 August 2013 2	Leyton Orient	0–1 (a.e.t.)	Hull City	Leyton
19:45		Report	Brady 107'	Stadium: Brisbane Road; Attendance: 3,181; Referee: Gavin Ward

=== Football League Trophy ===
3 September 2013 1	Gillingham	1–3	Leyton Orient	Gillingham
	Dack 69'	Report	Batt 26' (pen.), 45', 59'	Stadium: Priestfield Stadium; Attendance: 1,730; Referee: M Bull

8 October 2013 2	Leyton Orient	0–0 (4–2 p)	Coventry City	Leyton
19:30		Report		Stadium: Brisbane Road; Attendance: 2,151; Referee: Tim Robinson
	Penalties
	Mooney (penalty scored); Omozusi (penalty scored); Sawyer (penalty scored); James (penalty scored)		L. Clarke (penalty scored); Moussa (penalty missed); J. Clarke (penalty scored); Fleck (penalty missed)

12 November 2013 SQF	Stevenage	3–2	Leyton Orient	Stevenage
19:45	Zoko 2'; Akins 11'; Morais 16' (pen.)	Report	Mooney 13'; James 45' (pen.)	Stadium: Broadhall Way; Attendance: 1,532; Referee: James Adcock

== League One table ==
Pos	Team	Pld	W	D	L	GF	GA	GD	Pts	Promotion, qualification or relegation
1	Wolverhampton Wanderers (C, P)	46	31	10	5	89	31	+58	103	Promotion to Football League Championship
2	Brentford (P)	46	28	10	8	72	43	+29	94	Promotion to Football League Championship
3	Leyton Orient	46	25	11	10	85	45	+40	86	Qualification for League One play-offs (Note: Four teams play for one spot and promotion to Football League Championship.)
4	Rotherham United (O, P)	46	24	14	8	86	58	+28	86	Qualification for League One play-offs
5	Preston North End	46	23	16	7	72	46	+26	85	Qualification for League One play-offs

Updated to match(es) played on 3 May 2014. Source: BBC Sport
Rules for classification: 1) Points; 2) Goal difference; 3) Number of goals scored
(C) Champions; (O) Play-off winners; (P) Promoted
