= 2012–13 Leyton Orient F.C. season =

Leyton Orient F.C.
2012–13 season
- Chairman: Barry Hearn
- Manager: Russell Slade
- Stadium: Brisbane Road
- League One: 7th
- FA Cup: 3rd round, lost to Hull City – replay
- League Cup: 2nd round, lost to Everton
- League Trophy: Southern Section Final, lost to Southend United
- Top goalscorer: League: Kevin Lisbie, 16; All: Kevin Lisbie, 16
- Highest home attendance: 5,359 v. Southend United, Football League Trophy, 5 February 2013
- Lowest home attendance: 1,404 v. Barnet, Football League Trophy, 9 October 2012
- Average home league attendance: 4,002
Home colours	Away colours

The 2012–13 Leyton Orient F.C. season was the 114th season in the history of Leyton Orient Football Club, their 97th in the Football League, and seventh consecutive season in the third tier of the English football league system.

== Playing staff ==
Defender Elliott Omozusi's first contract with Leyton Orient was terminated in November 2011 due to his criminal conviction and subsequent prison sentence. In January 2013 after his release from prison, he re-signed for the club having trained with the first team for a short period.

- Statistics include League, FA Cup, League Cup and Football League Trophy appearances and goals

No.	Name	Nat.	Place of birth	Date of birth	Position	Club apps.	Club goals	Int. caps	Int. goals	Previous club	Date joined
1	Jamie Jones	ENG	Kirkby	18 February 1989 (age 37)	GK	142	0	0	0	Everton	30 June 2008
2	Leon McSweeney	IRE	Cork	19 December 1983 (age 42)	MF	73	0	0	0	Hartlepool United	16 June 2011
3	Gary Sawyer	ENG	Bideford	5 July 1985 (age 41)	DF	42	1	0	0	Bristol Rovers	12 May 2012
4	Romain Vincelot	FRA	Poitiers	29 October 1985 (age 41)	DF	15	1	0	0	Brighton & Hove Albion	7 February 2013
5	Scott Cuthbert	SCO	Alexandria	15 June 1987 (age 39)	DF	62	1	0	0	Swindon Town	3 June 2011
6	Mathieu Baudry	FRA	Sainte-Adresse	24 February 1988 (age 38)	DF	35	4	0	0	A.F.C. Bournemouth	28 June 2012
7	Dean Cox	ENG	Cuckfield	12 August 1987 (age 39)	MF	154	28	0	0	Brighton & Hove Albion	2 June 2010
8	Anthony Griffith	Montserrat	Huddersfield	28 October 1986 (age 40)	MF	28	0	2	0	Port Vale	19 May 2012
9	Kevin Lisbie	JAM	Hackney	17 October 1978 (age 48)	FW	72	28	0	0	Ipswich Town	9 September 2011
10	Michael Symes	ENG	Great Yarmouth	31 October 1983 (age 43)	FW	18	2	0	0	A.F.C. Bournemouth	28 June 2012
11	Jimmy Smith	ENG	Newham	7 January 1987 (age 39)	MF	189	22	0	0	Chelsea	10 July 2009
12	Lee Butcher	ENG	Waltham Forest	11 October 1988 (age 38)	GK	38	0	0	0	Tottenham Hotspur	25 May 2010
14	Charlie MacDonald	ENG	Southwark	13 February 1981 (age 45)	FW	20	3	0	0	MK Dons	11 January 2013
15	Nathan Clarke	ENG	Halifax	30 July 1983 (age 43)	DF	38	0	0	0	Huddersfield Town	18 July 2012
17	Moses Odubajo	ENG	Greenwich	28 July 1993 (age 33)	MF	59	4	0	0	Trainee	17 September 2010
19	Charlie Grainger	ENG	Enfield	31 July 1996 (age 30)	GK	0	0	0	0	Trainee	14 August 2012
20	Afolabi Obafemi	ENG	London	24 November 1994 (age 31)	FW	11	0	0	0	Trainee	5 May 2012
21	Lee Cook	ENG	Hammersmith	3 August 1982 (age 44)	MF	54	6	0	0	Queens Park Rangers	23 August 2012
22	Martin Rowlands	IRE	Hammersmith	8 February 1979 (age 47)	MF	40	4	5	0	Colchester United	28 August 2012
23	Lloyd James	WAL	Bristol	16 February 1988 (age 38)	MF	39	0	0	0	Colchester United	18 July 2012
24	Harry Lee	ENG	Hackney	20 March 1995 (age 31)	MF	1	0	0	0	Trainee	9 October 2012
25	De'Reece Vanderhyde	ENG	London	5 April 1995 (age 31)	DF	0	0	0	0	Trainee	9 October 2012
26	Harrison Georgiou	ENG	Goodmayes	2 February 1995 (age 31)	MF	0	0	0	0	Trainee	23 April 2013
27	Elliott Omozusi	ENG	Hackney	15 December 1988 (age 37)	DF	65	0	0	0	Leyton Orient	21 January 2013
39	Dave Mooney	IRE	Dublin	30 October 1984 (age 42)	FW	84	20	0	0	Reading	23 July 2011
Players who have appeared in Leyton Orient's squad this season but who have left the club:
	Ryan Allsop	ENG	Birmingham	17 June 1992 (age 34)	GK	24	0	0	0	Íþróttafélagið Höttur	16 July 2012
	Ade Azeez	ENG	Sidcup	8 January 1994 (age 32)	FW	1	0	0	0	Charlton Athletic (loan)	18 January 2013
	Shaun Batt	ENG	Harlow	22 February 1987 (age 39)	FW	13	3	0	0	Millwall (loan)	31 January 2013
	Ryan Brunt	ENG	Birmingham	26 May 1993 (age 33)	FW	22	3	0	0	Stoke City (loan)	17 July 2012
	Ben Chorley	ENG	Sidcup	30 September 1982 (age 44)	DF	159	9	0	0	Tranmere Rovers	17 June 2009
	Marc Laird	SCO	Edinburgh	23 January 1986 (age 40)	MF	29	2	0	0	Millwall	11 July 2011
	Billy Lobjoit	ENG	Edgware	3 September 1993 (age 33)	FW	1	0	0	0	Trainee	7 September 2011
	Alex Smith	ENG	Croydon	31 October 1991 (age 35)	DF	4	0	0	0	Fulham (loan)	22 November 2012
	Scott Wagstaff	ENG	Maidstone	31 March 1990 (age 36)	MF	7	0	0	0	Charlton Athletic (loan)	12 October 2012

== 2012–13 squad statistics ==
As of 27 April 2013

- Figures in brackets indicate appearances as a substitute
- Players in italics are loan players

No.	Pos.	Name	League		FA Cup		League Cup		Other		Total		Discipline	
No.	Pos.	Name	Apps	Goals	Apps	Goals	Apps	Goals	Apps	Goals	Apps	Goals	Yellow card	Red card
1	GK	(England) Jamie Jones	26	0	2	0	1	0	4	0	33	0	3	0
2	MF	(Republic of Ireland) Leon McSweeney	29 (3)	0	1 (2)	0	0 (1)	0	2 (1)	0	32 (7)	0	7	0
3	DF	(England) Gary Sawyer	34	1	2	0	2	0	4	0	42	1	5	0
4	DF	(France) Romain Vincelot	13 (2)	1	0	0	0	0	0	0	13 (2)	1	3	0
5	DF	(Scotland) Scott Cuthbert	16 (2)	0	0 (2)	0	1	0	4	0	21 (4)	0	2	0
6	DF	(France) Mathieu Baudry	22 (2)	3	4	0	2	1	5	0	33 (2)	4	6	0
7	MF	(England) Dean Cox	39 (5)	4	4	4	2	0	5	0	50 (5)	8	7	0
8	MF	(Montserrat) Anthony Griffith	16 (5)	0	1	0	2	0	3 (1)	0	22 (6)	0	8	2
9	FW	(Jamaica) Kevin Lisbie	23 (5)	16	2 (1)	0	2	0	1	0	28 (6)	16	5	0
10	FW	(England) Michael Symes	5 (8)	1	0 (1)	0	0 (1)	0	1 (2)	1	6 (12)	2	3	0
11	MF	(England) Jimmy Smith	21 (14)	3	2 (2)	0	2	0	1 (2)	0	26 (18)	3	1	0
12	GK	(England) Lee Butcher	0	0	0	0	0	0	0	0	0	0	0	0
14	FW	(England) Charlie MacDonald	17 (3)	3	0	0	0	0	0	0	17 (3)	3	1	0
15	DF	(England) Nathan Clarke	32 (2)	0	1	0	2	0	1	0	36 (2)	0	4	0
17	MF	(England) Moses Odubajo	34 (10)	2	4	0	1	0	5	1	44 (10)	3	5	0
19	GK	(England) Charlie Grainger	0	0	0	0	0	0	0	0	0	0	0	0
20	FW	(England) Afolabi Obafemi	0 (8)	0	0	0	0	0	0 (2)	0	0 (10)	0	0	0
21	MF	(England) Lee Cook	30 (8)	5	3	0	0 (1)	0	2 (1)	0	35 (10)	5	6	0
22	MF	(Republic of Ireland) Martin Rowlands	31 (2)	4	3 (1)	0	0 (1)	0	2	0	36 (4)	4	5	0
23	MF	(Wales) Lloyd James	26 (2)	0	4	0	2	0	5	0	37 (2)	0	5	0
24	MF	(England) Harry Lee	0 (1)	0	0	0	0	0	0	0	0 (1)	0	0	0
25	DF	(England) De'Reece Vanderhyde	0	0	0	0	0	0	0	0	0	0	0	0
26	MF	(England) Harrison Georgiou	0	0	0	0	0	0	0	0	0	0	0	0
27	DF	(England) Elliott Omozusi	1 (5)	0	0	0	0	0	0	0	1 (5)	0	1	0
39	FW	(Republic of Ireland) Dave Mooney	22 (10)	5	4	4	1	0	5	4	32 (10)	13	4	0
Players who have appeared in Leyton Orient's squad this season but who have left the club:
4	DF	(England) Ben Chorley	27 (1)	2	3	0	1 (1)	0	1	0	32 (2)	2	8	0
14	MF	(Scotland) Marc Laird	0 (1)	0	0	0	0	0	0 (1)	0	0 (2)	0	0	0
16	GK	(England) Ryan Allsop	20	0	2	0	1	0	1	0	24	0	1	0
18	FW	(England) Billy Lobjoit	0	0	0	0	0	0	0	0	0	0	0	0
26	FW	(England) Ryan Brunt	8 (10)	3	1 (1)	0	0 (1)	0	1	0	10 (12)	3	0	0
26	FW	(England) Ade Azeez	1	0	0	0	0	0	0	0	1	0	0	0
27	MF	(England) Scott Wagstaff	6 (1)	0	0	0	0	0	0	0	6 (1)	0	0	0
27	DF	(England) Alex Smith	0 (2)	0	1	0	0	0	0 (1)	0	1 (3)	0	0	0
28	FW	(England) Shaun Batt	7 (4)	2	0	0	0	0	2	1	9 (4)	3	1	0

=== Top scorers ===
Place	Position	Name	League One	FA Cup	League Cup	JP Trophy	Total
1	FW	Kevin Lisbie	16	0	0	0	16
2	FW	Dave Mooney	5	4	0	4	13
3	MF	Dean Cox	4	4	0	0	8
4	MF	Lee Cook	5	0	0	0	5
5=	DF	Mathieu Baudry	3	0	1	0	4
5=	MF	Martin Rowlands	4	0	0	0	4
7=	FW	Shaun Batt	2	0	0	1	3
7=	FW	Ryan Brunt	3	0	0	0	3
7=	FW	Charlie MacDonald	3	0	0	0	3
7=	MF	Moses Odubajo	2	0	0	1	3
7=	MF	Jimmy Smith	3	0	0	0	3
12=	DF	Ben Chorley	2	0	0	0	2
12=	FW	Michael Symes	1	0	0	1	2
14=	DF	Gary Sawyer	1	0	0	0	1
14=	DF	Romain Vincelot	1	0	0	0	1

== Results ==
=== Pre-season friendlies ===
18 July 2012	Sutton United	3–5	Leyton Orient	Gander Green Lane, Sutton
19:45	Stefan Payne 5' (pen.); Kyle Vassell 23'; Gareth Gwillim 65' (pen.)	Report	Kevin Lisbie 2'; Ryan Brunt 22'; Dean Cox 44'; Afolabi Obafemi 69', 75' (pen.)	Attendance: 599

21 July 2012	Ebbsfleet United	1–0	Leyton Orient	Stonebridge Road, Northfleet
15:00	Nathan Elder 67'	Report		Attendance: 617

25 July 2012	Wolverhampton Wanderers XI	0–2	Leyton Orient	Champneys Springs, Ashby-de-la-Zouch
12:00		Report	Kevin Lisbie 34'; Ryan Brunt 85'	Attendance: 0

28 July 2012	Dartford	1–0	Leyton Orient	Princes Park, Dartford
15:00	Danny Harris 43'	Report		Attendance: 633

4 August 2012	Luton Town	1–0	Leyton Orient	Kenilworth Road, Luton
15:00	Jon Shaw 48'	Report		Attendance: 1,607

7 August 2012	Queens Park Rangers XI	1–2	Leyton Orient	Imperial College Sports Ground, Harlington
13:00	Mo Sharif 71'	Report	Dave Mooney 25' (pen.); Dean Cox 48'	Attendance: 0

8 August 2012	Maidstone United	2–1	Leyton Orient	Gallagher Stadium, Maidstone
19:45	Paul Booth 3'; Nicky Humphrey 35'	Report	Afolabi Obafemi 15'	Attendance: 1,467; Referee: D Blunden

=== League One ===
18 August 2012	Tranmere Rovers	3–1	Leyton Orient	Prenton Park, Tranmere
15:00	Zoumana Bakayogo 34'; Jean-Louis Akpa Akpro 57', 65'	BBC report	Michael Symes 88' (pen.)	Attendance: 5,063; Referee: Geoff Eltringham

21 August 2012	Leyton Orient	0–1	Stevenage	Brisbane Road, Leyton
19:45		BBC report	Lucas Akins 23'	Attendance: 3,564; Referee: Rushton

1 September 2012	Crawley Town	1–0	Leyton Orient	Broadfield Stadium, Crawley
15:00	Nicky Ajose 72'	BBC report		Attendance: 4,287; Referee: Phil Gibbs

8 September 2012	Swindon Town	0–1	Leyton Orient	County Ground, Swindon
15:00		BBC report	Lee Cook 59'	Attendance: 8,072; Referee: Mohareb

13 September 2012	Leyton Orient	1–0	Brentford	Brisbane Road, Leyton
19:45	Ryan Brunt 75'	BBC report		Attendance: 3,333; Referee: Dowd

18 September 2012	Leyton Orient	4–1	Yeovil Town	Brisbane Road, Leyton
19:45	Ben Chorley 3'; Ryan Brunt 24'; Jimmy Smith 71'; Kevin Lisbie 79'	BBC report	Sam Foley 55'	Attendance: 2,876; Referee: Stroud

22 September 2012	Crewe Alexandra	1–1	Leyton Orient	Alexandra Stadium, Crewe
15:00	Matt Tootle 2'	BBC report	Martin Rowlands 19'	Attendance: 5,183; Referee: Salisbury

29 September 2012	Leyton Orient	0–2	Doncaster Rovers	Brisbane Road, Leyton
15:00		BBC report	Iain Hume 12'; David Cotterill 21'	Attendance: 4,401; Referee: Miller

2 October 2012	Walsall	1–2	Leyton Orient	Banks's Stadium, Walsall
19:45	Will Grigg 58' (pen.)	BBC report	Lee Cook 11'; Dean Cox 29'	Attendance: 3,281; Referee: Bond

6 October 2012	Leyton Orient	0–1	Sheffield United	Brisbane Road, Leyton
15:00		BBC report	Nick Blackman 59'	Attendance: 4,882; Referee: Phillips

13 October 2012	Bournemouth	2–0	Leyton Orient	Dean Court, Bournemouth
15:00	Lewis Grabban 65'; Marc Pugh 67'	BBC report		Attendance: 4,951; Referee: Steve Martin

16 October 2012	Leyton Orient	1–0	Hartlepool United	Brisbane Road, Leyton
19:45	Ryan Brunt 47'	BBC report		Attendance: 2,664; Referee: Malone

20 October 2012	Oldham Athletic	2–0	Leyton Orient	Boundary Park, Oldham
15:00	Matt Derbyshire 79'; Jose Baxter 83'	BBC report		Attendance: 3,919; Referee: Duncan

23 October 2012	Leyton Orient	0–2	Colchester United	Brisbane Road, Leyton
19:45		BBC report	Anthony Wordsworth 33'; Ian Henderson 51'	Attendance: 3,378; Referee: Whitestone

27 October 2012	Leyton Orient	0–1	Coventry City	Brisbane Road, Leyton
15:00		BBC report	David McGoldrick 7'	Attendance: 4,741; Referee: Robinson

7 November 2012	Milton Keynes Dons	1–0	Leyton Orient	Stadium mk, Milton Keynes
19:45	Ryan Lowe 41'	BBC report		Attendance: 6,985; Referee: Lewis

10 November 2012	Leyton Orient	2–1	Shrewsbury Town	Brisbane Road, Leyton
15:00	Kevin Lisbie 33' (pen.), 88'	BBC report	Jon Taylor 70'	Attendance: 3,822; Referee: Carl Berry

17 November 2012	Carlisle United	1–4	Leyton Orient	Brunton Park, Carlisle
15:00	Peter Murphy 25'	BBC report	Dave Mooney 18', 44'; Ben Chorley 26'; Lee Cook 38'	Attendance: 3,964; Referee: Harrington

20 November 2012	Portsmouth	2–3	Leyton Orient	Fratton Park, Portsmouth
19:45	Izale McLeod 57' (pen.); Scott Allan 65'	BBC report	Kevin Lisbie 32', 62' (pen.); Moses Odubajo 51'	Attendance: 9,955; Referee: Scott

24 November 2012	Leyton Orient	2–0	Preston North End	Brisbane Road, Leyton
15:00	Mathieu Baudry 43'; Kevin Lisbie 61'	BBC report		Attendance: 4,190; Referee: Andy Davies / Michael Blackledge

8 December 2012	Bury	0–2	Leyton Orient	Gigg Lane, Bury
15:00		BBC report	Kevin Lisbie 31', 56'	Attendance: 2,121; Referee: Sarginson

15 December 2012	Leyton Orient	1–3	Scunthorpe United	Brisbane Road, Leyton
15:00	Kevin Lisbie 79' (pen.)	BBC report	Christian Ribeiro 61'; Karl Hawley 69'; Damien Mozika 80'	Attendance: 4,942; Referee: Deadman

29 December 2012	Leyton Orient	2–1	Walsall	Brisbane Road, Leyton
15:00	Dave Mooney 43'; Moses Odubajo 87'	BBC report	Sam Mantom 79'	Attendance: 3,865; Referee: Ward

1 January 2013	Yeovil Town	3–0	Leyton Orient	Huish Park, Yeovil
15:00	Paddy Madden 41', 74'; James Hayter 59'	BBC report		Attendance: 3,516; Referee: Hooper

12 January 2013	Leyton Orient	1–1	Crewe Alexandra	Brisbane Road, Leyton
15:00	Lee Cook 26'	BBC report	Byron Moore 39'	Attendance: 3,755; Referee: Stephen Martin

19 January 2013	Doncaster Rovers	2–0	Leyton Orient	Keepmoat Stadium, Doncaster
15:00	Rob Jones 19'; Chris Brown 53'	BBC report		Attendance: 6,438; Referee: Drysdale

22 January 2013	Brentford	2–2	Leyton Orient	Griffin Park, Brentford
19:45	Paul Hayes 16'; Clayton Donaldson 39'	BBC report	Martin Rowlands 6'; Lee Cook 86'	Attendance: 4,523; Referee: Tierney

26 January 2013	Leyton Orient	2–1	Notts County	Brisbane Road, Leyton
15:00	Dave Mooney 65'; Mathieu Baudry 68'	BBC report	Jeff Hughes 78'	Attendance: 3,578; Referee: Collins

29 January 2013	Leyton Orient	0–0	Swindon Town	Brisbane Road, Leyton
19:45		BBC report		Attendance: 3,536; Referee: Andy D'Urso

2 February 2013	Stevenage	0–1	Leyton Orient	Broadhall Way, Stevenage
15:00		BBC report	Dean Cox 10'	Referee: Sheldrake

9 February 2013	Leyton Orient	2–1	Tranmere Rovers	Brisbane Road, Leyton
15:00	Charlie MacDonald 9'; Martin Rowlands 67'	BBC report	Michael O'Halloran 75'	Attendance: 4,351; Referee: Trevor Kettle

16 February 2013	Hartlepool United	2–1	Leyton Orient	Victoria Park, Hartlepool
15:00	Peter Hartley 88'; Luke James 90'	BBC report	Martin Rowlands 8' (pen.)	Attendance: 3,773; Referee: Duncan

23 February 2013	Leyton Orient	0–1	Crawley Town	Brisbane Road, Leyton
15:00		BBC report	Billy Clarke 11'	Attendance: 3,463; Referee: Rushton

26 February 2013	Sheffield United	0–0	Leyton Orient	Bramall Lane, Sheffield
19:45		BBC report		Attendance: 16,540; Referee: Phil Gibbs

2 March 2013	Leyton Orient	3–1	Bournemouth	Brisbane Road, Leyton
15:00	Charlie MacDonald 26', 48'; Kevin Lisbie 79'	BBC report	Brett Pitman 66'	Attendance: 5,136; Referee: Linington

6 March 2013	Notts County	1–1	Leyton Orient	Meadow Lane, Nottingham
19:45	Neal Bishop 31'	BBC report	Kevin Lisbie 66' (pen.)	Attendance: 4,004; Referee: Jeremy Simpson

9 March 2013	Shrewsbury Town	0–2	Leyton Orient	New Meadow, Shrewsbury
15:00		BBC report	Mathieu Baudry 33'; Kevin Lisbie 52' (pen.)	Attendance: 5,274; Referee: Harrington

12 March 2013	Leyton Orient	1–0	Portsmouth	Brisbane Road, Leyton
19:45	Shaun Batt 57'	BBC report		Attendance: 3,641; Referee: Sutton

16 March 2013	Leyton Orient	4–1	Carlisle United	Brisbane Road, Leyton
15:00	Romain Vincelot 32'; Shaun Batt 45'; Kevin Lisbie 69' (pen.); Dean Cox 89'	BBC report	Matty Robson 78'	Attendance: 4,387; Referee: Hooper

23 March 2013	Preston North End	0–0	Leyton Orient	Deepdale, Preston
15:00		BBC report		Attendance: 8,450; Referee: Stephen Martin

29 March 2013	Scunthorpe United	2–1	Leyton Orient	Glanford Park, Scunthorpe
15:00	Akpo Sodje 3'; Niall Canavan 42'	BBC report	Kevin Lisbie 45'	Attendance: 3,052; Referee: Webb

1 April 2013	Leyton Orient	2–0	Bury	Brisbane Road, Leyton
15:00	Jimmy Smith 9'; Dave Mooney 34'	BBC report		Attendance: 3,713; Referee: Woolmer

6 April 2013	Colchester United	2–1	Leyton Orient	Community Stadium, Colchester
15:00	Gavin Massey 20'; David Wright 24'	BBC report	Kevin Lisbie 45'	Attendance: 4,704; Referee: Clark

13 April 2013	Leyton Orient	2–0	Milton Keynes Dons	Brisbane Road, Leyton
15:00	Gary Sawyer 81'; Kevin Lisbie 90'	BBC report		Attendance: 4,634; Referee: Andy D'Urso

20 April 2013	Coventry City	0–1	Leyton Orient	Ricoh Arena, Coventry
15:00		BBC report	Dean Cox 45'	Attendance: 11,234; Referee: Ilderton

27 April 2013	Leyton Orient	1–1	Oldham Athletic	Brisbane Road, Leyton
15:00	Jimmy Smith 10'	BBC report	Kirk Millar 46'	Attendance: 5,191; Referee: Graham

=== Results by round ===
Round	1	2	3	4	5	6	7	8	9	10	11	12	13	14	15	16	17	18	19	20	21	22	23	24	25	26	27	28	29	30	31	32	33	34	35	36	37	38	39	40	41	42	43	44	45	46
Ground	A	H	A	A	H	H	A	H	A	H	A	H	A	H	H	A	H	A	A	H	A	H	H	A	H	A	A	H	H	A	H	A	H	A	H	A	A	H	H	A	A	H	A	H	A	H
Result	L	L	L	W	W	W	D	L	W	L	L	W	L	L	L	L	W	W	W	W	W	L	W	L	D	L	D	W	D	W	W	L	L	D	W	D	W	W	W	D	L	W	L	W	W	D
Position	21	23	23	20	16	13	14	15	12	14	17	12	16	18	19	20	16	15	13	13	11	12	14	15	14	15	15	15	15	13	10	10	13	13	11	11	11	10	10	9	9	9	9	8	7	7

Updated to match(es) played on 27 April 2013. Source: see below
A = Away; H = Home; W = Win; D = Draw; L = Loss

=== FA Cup ===
14 November 2012 1	Gloucester City	0–2	Leyton Orient	Whaddon Road, Cheltenham
19:45		BBC report	Dave Mooney 87'; Dean Cox 88'	Attendance: 1,381; Referee: Rushton

2 December 2012 2	Alfreton Town	2–4	Leyton Orient	North Street, Alfreton
15:15	Paul Clayton 4'; Ben Tomlinson 52'	BBC report	Dean Cox 25', 86'; Dave Mooney 30', 36'	Attendance: 1,104; Referee: Bobby Madley

5 January 2013 3	Hull City	1–1	Leyton Orient	KC Stadium, Kingston upon Hull
15:00	Nick Proschwitz 90+3'	BBC report	Dave Mooney 78'	Attendance: 8,585; Referee: Williamson

15 January 2013 3R	Leyton Orient	1–2 (a.e.t.)	Hull City	Brisbane Road, Leyton
19:45	Dean Cox 87'	BBC report	Nick Proschwitz 41'; Tom Cairney 117'	Attendance: 3,601; Referee: Scott

=== League Cup ===
14 August 2012 1	Charlton Athletic	1–1 (3–4 p)	Leyton Orient	The Valley, Charlton
19:45	Scott Wagstaff 28'	Report	Mathieu Baudry 45'	Attendance: 5,914; Referee: Ward
	Penalties
	Johnnie Jackson (penalty missed); Lawrie Wilson (penalty missed); Danny Green (penalty scored); Bradley Wright-Phillips (penalty scored); Bradley Pritchard (penalty scored)		(penalty scored) Michael Symes; (penalty scored) Gary Sawyer; (penalty missed) Ben Chorley; (penalty scored) Lloyd James; (penalty scored) Ryan Brunt

29 August 2012 2	Everton	5–0	Leyton Orient	Goodison Park, Liverpool
20:00	Kevin Mirallas 16', 29'; Leon Osman 22'; Victor Anichebe 35'; Magaye Gueye 67'	Report		Attendance: 24,124; Referee: East

=== Football League Trophy ===
9 October 2012 2	Leyton Orient	1–0	Barnet	Brisbane Road, Leyton
19:00	Moses Odubajo 25'	Report		Attendance: 1,404; Referee: Roger East

5 December 2012 SQF	Northampton Town	0–3	Leyton Orient	Sixfields Stadium, Northampton
19:45		BBC Report	Dave Mooney 57', 65'; Michael Symes 73' (pen.)	Attendance: 1,752; Referee: Mark Haywood

8 January 2013 SSF	Leyton Orient	1–0	Yeovil Town	Brisbane Road, Leyton
19:00	Dave Mooney 90'	BBC Report		Attendance: 2,755; Referee: Sheldrake

5 February 2013 SF1	Leyton Orient	0–1	Southend United	Brisbane Road, Leyton
19:45		BBC Report	Ryan Leonard 57'	Attendance: 5,359; Referee: Keith Stroud

20 February 2013 SF2	Southend United	2–2	Leyton Orient	Roots Hall, Southend-on-Sea
19:15	Barry Corr 61'; Ben Reeves 90'	BBC Report	Shaun Batt 8'; Dave Mooney 72'	Attendance: 9,421; Referee: Woolmer

== League One table ==
Pos	Team	Pld	W	D	L	GF	GA	GD	Pts	Promotion, qualification or relegation
5	Sheffield United	46	19	18	9	56	42	+14	75	Qualification for League One play-offs (Note: Four teams play for one spot and promotion to Football League Championship.)
6	Swindon Town	46	20	14	12	72	39	+33	74	Qualification for League One play-offs
7	Leyton Orient	46	21	8	17	55	48	+7	71	
8	Milton Keynes Dons	46	19	13	14	62	45	+17	70	
9	Walsall	46	17	17	12	65	58	+7	68	

Updated to match(es) played on 27 April 2013. Source: BBC Sport
Rules for classification: 1) Points; 2) Goal difference; 3) Number of goals scored
