= Scott Cuthbert =

Scottish association football player

Personal information
- Full name: Scott James Cuthbert
- Date of birth: 15 June 1987 (age 39)
- Place of birth: Alexandria, Scotland
- Height: 6 ft 2 in (1.88 m)
- Position: Defender

Team information
- Current team: Stevenage (coach)

Youth career
- 1998–2003: Celtic

Senior career*
Years	Team	Apps	(Gls)
2003–2009	Celtic	0	(0)
2006	→ Livingston (loan)	4	(1)
2008–2009	→ St Mirren (loan)	29	(0)
2009–2011	Swindon Town	80	(5)
2011–2015	Leyton Orient	133	(7)
2015–2018	Luton Town	97	(3)
2018–2022	Stevenage	139	(8)
2022–2024	Woking	81	(3)
Total		563	(27)

International career
2005–2007	Scotland U19		
2007	Scotland U20	4	(0)
2007–2008	Scotland U21	12	(1)
2009	Scotland B	1	(0)
- * Club domestic league appearances and goals

Scott James Cuthbert (born 15 June 1987) is a Scottish former professional footballer who played as a defender. He is currently a first-team coach at EFL League One club Stevenage.

Cuthbert began his career in the youth system at Celtic and signed his first professional contract with the club in August 2003. During his time at Celtic, Cuthbert was loaned out to Scottish clubs Livingston and St Mirren. He signed for Swindon Town of League One in July 2009 and spent two seasons there. In June 2011, Cuthbert joined Leyton Orient, and in his first season was named as the club's Player of the Year. After four years at Leyton Orient, Cuthbert was released and subsequently joined Luton Town of League Two. He was named club captain during the 2015–16 season and retained this role during his three years at Luton. In his final season with the club, the 2017–18 season, he helped Luton achieve promotion to League One. Cuthbert signed for League Two club Stevenage in May 2018. He has represented Scotland at under-19, under-20, under-21 and B level.

== Club career ==
=== Celtic ===
Born in Alexandria, West Dunbartonshire, Cuthbert was part of Celtic's youth academy from the age of 11, signing his first professional contract in August 2003 at the age of 16. He went on to captain the club's under-19 and reserve teams. In the 2007–08 season, Cuthbert was an unused substitute in an Old Firm derby as Celtic lost 3–0.

==== Loan spells ====
Cuthbert joined Scottish First Division club Livingston on a one-month loan in order to gain first-team experience during the 2006–07 season, making four appearances. He scored his first professional goal in a 3–1 defeat at home to Airdrie United.

He was loaned out once again, this time on a season-long loan to Scottish Premier League club St Mirren in August 2008. He made his debut in a 0–0 draw with Kilmarnock on 16 August. Cuthbert made 34 appearances in all competitions before returning to Celtic. After leaving St Mirren, Cuthbert said a second loan spell was a possibility should he fail to secure a first-team place at Celtic.

=== Swindon Town ===
Despite interest from former loan club St Mirren, Cuthbert signed for League One club Swindon Town on 13 July 2009, on a two-year contract for a fee thought to be £100,000. Cuthbert made his debut for Swindon on the opening day of the 2009–10 season in a 5–0 defeat away to Gillingham. He was subsequently left out of the starting lineup for four matches until Swindon faced Wolverhampton Wanderers in the League Cup second round, which they lost 6–5 on penalties following a 0–0 draw after extra time. Cuthbert scored his first goal for Swindon four days later in a 2–1 win at home to Southend United. Towards the end of the season, Swindon were well-placed for promotion to the Championship, but with only one win in their last six matches, the club finished in fifth place and would have to contest the play-offs. Swindon defeated Charlton 5–4 on penalties after their two-legged semi-final ended 3–3 after extra time. Cuthbert later said the success of getting to Wembley Stadium in his first season with the club was a dream come true. The play-off final saw Swindon lose 1–0 to Millwall, preventing the club from gaining promotion to the Championship.

At the start of the 2010–11 season, Cuthbert was named as the club's vice-captain. He scored his first goal of the season in a 2–1 defeat away to Milton Keynes Dons on 28 August 2010. Six months later, Cuthbert scored his second goal of the season in a 2–1 defeat away to Colchester United on 12 February 2011. In March, Cuthbert suffered a fractured cheekbone in a 1–1 draw with Dagenham & Redbridge, but was told he did not need surgery. Swindon were relegated to League Two after a 3–1 defeat away to Sheffield Wednesday on 25 April. Following the completion of the season, Cuthbert reflected on a mistake he made during a 2–1 defeat at home to Notts County, two days before Swindon were relegated, and was intent on returning the following season as a better player. However, Cuthbert was not offered a new contract, despite expressing a desire to remain with the club.

=== Leyton Orient ===
Ahead of the 2011–12 season, on 3 June 2011, Cuthbert signed a two-year contract with League One club Leyton Orient. He made his Leyton Orient debut on the opening day of the campaign, playing as a centre back in a 1–0 defeat to Walsall. Cuthbert received a red card in a 3–1 defeat at home to AFC Bournemouth on 13 September 2011 and was subsequently suspended for three matches. Cuthbert scored his first goal for the club on 8 October in a 3–2 win over Scunthorpe United. At the end of October, Cuthbert was nominated for the League One Player of the Month award. Cuthbert suffered a hamstring injury on 31 March 2012, in a 2–0 defeat to Charlton Athletic, causing him to miss the final seven matches of the season. Despite his injury, Cuthbert was named Leyton Orient's Player of the Year for the 2011–12 season. Shortly after receiving it, Cuthbert said that winning the award was a proud moment for him.

Cuthbert made a recovery from his injury ahead of a friendly match with Ebbsfleet United in pre-season ahead of the 2012–13 campaign. After just two appearances, Cuthbert again suffered a hamstring injury that kept him from playing until December 2012. In the Football League Trophy southern section semi-final at home to Yeovil Town, Cuthbert provided a winning assist for Dave Mooney in a 1–0 win to send the club through the southern section final. In a 0–0 draw with Preston North End on 23 March 2013, Cuthbert suffered a fractured metatarsal that caused him to miss the rest of the season. Shortly after the end of the season, Cuthbert signed a new two-year contract with the club.

Cuthbert played most of the 2013–14 season at right back, as Leyton Orient came close to promotion to the Championship, ultimately losing on penalties to Rotherham United in the play-off final. Cuthbert played in 54 matches in all competitions over the season, scoring four goals. The 2014–15 season was a complete contrast, as Leyton Orient were relegated on the final day of the season after only managing a 2–2 draw with Cuthbert's former club Swindon Town. After the season ended, Cuthbert was not offered a new contract. Following his departure, Cuthbert stated that the club told him to wait by the phone to find out if he would be offered a new contract upon the expiry of his deal, which he "wasn't set on waiting about to be told whether I was wanted or not".

=== Luton Town ===
Cuthbert signed a two-year contract with League Two club Luton Town on 26 May 2015. Upon his arrival, Cuthbert stated "The aim is promotion – I wouldn't have come to this club if I didn't think that was possible." He made his debut for the club on the opening day of the 2015–16 season in a 1–1 draw with Accrington Stanley. Cuthbert was sent off in second half stoppage time for a professional foul during a 3–2 defeat away to Notts County on 12 September. After the departure of Steve McNulty who joined National League club Tranmere Rovers on loan in October, Cuthbert was named temporary club captain, but was only given the role on a permanent basis after Nathan Jones replaced John Still as manager in January 2016. Cuthbert went off injured during a 1–0 defeat at home to Stevenage on 2 April, but despite his return to training prior to the penultimate match of the season against Northampton Town on 30 April, he did not add to his tally of 40 appearances during the season.

Ahead of the 2016–17 season, manager Jones confirmed Cuthbert would remain club captain ahead of summer signings Alan Sheehan and Johnny Mullins. On the opening day of the season, Cuthbert was initially named on the bench, but an injury to Alan Sheehan moments before kick-off meant he was called up to the starting lineup. Luton went on to achieve a 3–0 win away to Plymouth Argyle, after which Cuthbert was praised for his performance by Jones. His performance also earned him a place in the English Football League Team of the Week. After making 50 starting appearances in league matches for Luton, Cuthbert triggered a one-year contract extension to keep him at the club until June 2018.

The 2017–18 season began with Cuthbert once again a first-team regular in the centre of defence for Luton. He scored his first goal of the campaign in the club's 2–1 comeback victory at Wycombe Wanderers on 16 September 2017. His run in the first-team was curtailed due to a groin injury sustained in Luton's 7–0 home win against Cambridge United on 18 November 2017. The injury was initially expected to keep him out of action until January 2018, although he ultimately returned in March 2018. Cuthbert made 25 appearances in all competitions during the campaign, scoring twice, as Luton won promotion to League One after finishing in second place. He was released by Luton at the end of the season.

=== Stevenage ===
Following his departure from Luton, Cuthbert signed for League Two club Stevenage on 30 May 2018. He joined the Hertfordshire club on a two-year contract. Cuthbert made his Stevenage debut in the club's opening match of the 2018–19 season, a 2–2 draw with Tranmere Rovers at Broadhall Way. Cuthbert was named as Stevenage's Player of the Year at the club's end-of-season awards ceremony on 4 May 2019.

Cuthbert was released by the club at the end of the 2021–22 season.

=== Woking ===
On 17 June 2022, Cuthbert agreed to join National League club Woking on a one-year deal. On 21 February 2023 Cuthbert scored his first goal for Woking a header from a corner in a 2-1 Win against Bromley.

== Coaching career ==
Cuthbert was appointed as a first team coach at Stevenage in May 2024 following the appointment of Alex Revell as manager.

== International career ==
Cuthbert was captain of the Scotland under-19 team that reached the final of the UEFA under-19 Championships in 2006 and the Scotland under-20 team that played at 2007 under-20 World Cup in Canada. He also represented Scotland B in May 2009.

== Style of play ==
Cuthbert has been deployed at centre back throughout his career, although was used as a right back for two seasons at Leyton Orient. Cuthbert states that he is "more suited" to playing in the centre of defence and sees himself as a centre back, but also feels comfortable at right back. Manager John Still described Cuthbert as possessing "leadership qualities; he's a good talker and a good organiser".

== Career statistics ==
As of 20 April 2024

Appearances and goals by club, season and competition
Club	Season	League			National Cup		League Cup		Other		Total	
Club	Season	Division	Apps	Goals	Apps	Goals	Apps	Goals	Apps	Goals	Apps	Goals
Celtic	2004–05	Scottish Premier League	0	0	0	0	0	0	0	0	0	0
Celtic	2005–06	Scottish Premier League	0	0	0	0	0	0	0	0	0	0
Celtic	2006–07	Scottish Premier League	0	0	0	0	0	0	0	0	0	0
Celtic	2007–08	Scottish Premier League	0	0	0	0	0	0	0	0	0	0
Celtic	2008–09	Scottish Premier League	0	0	—		—		0	0	0	0
Celtic	Total		0	0	0	0	0	0	0	0	0	0
Livingston (loan)	2006–07	Scottish First Division	4	1	—		—		—		4	1
St Mirren (loan)	2008–09	Scottish Premier League	29	0	4	0	1	0	—		34	0
Swindon Town	2009–10	League One	39	3	3	0	1	0	5 (Note: Two appearances in Football League Trophy, three in League One play-offs)	0	48	3
Swindon Town	2010–11	League One	41	2	3	0	1	0	3 (Note: Appearance(s) in Football League Trophy)	0	48	2
Swindon Town	Total		80	5	6	0	2	0	8	0	96	5
Leyton Orient	2011–12	League One	33	1	2	0	2	0	0	0	37	1
Leyton Orient	2012–13	League One	18	0	2	0	1	0	4	0	25	0
Leyton Orient	2013–14	League One	44	4	2	0	2	0	6 (Note: Three appearances in Football League Trophy, three in League One play-offs)	0	54	4
Leyton Orient	2014–15	League One	38	2	1	0	2	0	3	0	44	2
Leyton Orient	Total		133	7	7	0	7	0	13	0	160	7
Luton Town	2015–16	League Two	36	0	1	0	2	0	1	0	40	0
Luton Town	2016–17	League Two	38	1	3	0	1	0	4 (Note: Two appearances in EFL Trophy, two appearances and one goal in League Two play-offs)	1	46	2
Luton Town	2017–18	League Two	23	2	1	0	1	0	0	0	25	2
Luton Town	Total		97	3	5	0	4	0	5	1	111	4
Stevenage	2018–19	League Two	46	2	1	0	1	0	0	0	48	2
Stevenage	2019–20	League Two	21	2	2	0	1	0	2 (Note: Appearance(s) in EFL Trophy)	0	26	2
Stevenage	2020–21	League Two	33	1	2	0	1	1	1	0	37	2
Stevenage	2021–22	League Two	39	3	2	0	1	0	1	0	43	3
Stevenage	Total		139	8	7	0	4	1	3	0	154	9
Woking	2022–23	National League	41	1	2	0	—		2 (Note: One appearance FA Trophy and one in National League play-off)	0	45	1
Woking	2023–24	National League	40	2	1	0	—		0	0	41	2
Woking	Total		81	3	3	0	—		2	0	86	3
Career total			548	26	33	0	18	1	33	1	632	28

== Honours ==
Luton Town

- EFL League Two runner-up: 2017–18

Individual

- Leyton Orient Player of the Year: 2011–12
- Stevenage Player of the Year: 2018–19
