= Moses Odubajo =

English footballer (born 1993)

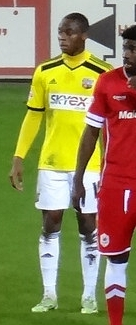
- Odubajo playing for Brentford in 2014

Personal information
- Full name: Moses Adeshina Ayoola Junior Odubajo
- Date of birth: 28 July 1993 (age 33)
- Place of birth: Greenwich, England
- Height: 5 ft 10 in (1.77 m)
- Position: Right-back

Team information
- Current team: Omonia
- Number: 28

Youth career
- Millwall
- 2009–2010: Leyton Orient

Senior career*
| Years | Team | Apps | (Gls) |
| 2010–2014 | Leyton Orient | 93 | (13) |
| 2010 | → St Albans City (loan) | 1 | (0) |
| 2012 | → Sutton United (loan) | 3 | (0) |
| 2012 | → Bishop's Stortford (loan) | 2 | (3) |
| 2014–2015 | Brentford | 45 | (3) |
| 2015–2018 | Hull City | 42 | (0) |
| 2018–2019 | Brentford | 30 | (0) |
| 2019–2021 | Sheffield Wednesday | 40 | (0) |
| 2021–2022 | Queens Park Rangers | 28 | (0) |
| 2022–2024 | Aris | 53 | (1) |
| 2024–2026 | AEK Athens | 18 | (0) |
| 2026– | Omonia | 7 | (0) |

International career
| 2015 | England U20 | 5 | (0) |
- * Club domestic league appearances and goals as of 14 June 2026

Moses Adeshina Ayoola Junior Odubajo (born 28 July 1993) is an English professional footballer who plays as a right-back for Cypriot First Division club Omonia. He is a product of the Leyton Orient youth system and represented England at U20 level.

== Club career ==
=== Leyton Orient ===
==== Early years ====
A right back or right winger, Odubajo began his career at age 14 with local club Millwall and spent time with the club on trial, before leaving football behind at the age of 13, following the death of his mother. He returned to Millwall following a break from the game, but failed to win a scholarship deal. Odubajo was recommend by the Lions to Leyton Orient and went on trial with the club. He was offered a scholarship by youth team manager Wayne Burnett, though Burnett later changed his mind about the deal. Burnett left Orient in the summer of 2009 and Odubajo returned to the club, impressing new youth team manager Andy Edwards and finally winning a scholarship deal. He appeared for the youth team during the 2009–10 season and contributed to the team's run to the fourth round of the FA Youth Cup. Odubajo was an unused substitute for the first team on 11 occasions during the 2010–11 season and signed a one-year professional contract with the club on 29 April 2011. He also won Orient's Youth Team Player of the Year award.

Odubajo was called into the first team squad for four of Orient's matches early in the 2011–12 season and made his professional debut in a Football League Trophy first round East London derby versus Dagenham & Redbridge on 7 September 2011. Initially named as a substitute, Odubajo replaced Elliot Omozusi after 64 minutes in a match which ended with a penalty shoot-out. He scored a penalty in the shoot-out, which Orient lost 14–13. He made five further appearances during the 2011–12 season and made his first start for the club in the final game of the campaign at home to Rochdale. In the match, he scored his first senior goal with a "stunning" winner in a 2–1 victory. The 25-yard strike earned him the club's Goal of the Season award. On 25 June 2012, Odubajo signed a new one-year deal with the Os.

==== First team breakthrough ====
Featuring mainly as a right back during the opening months of the 2012–13 season, Odubajo made regular substitute appearances and sporadic starts before finally breaking into the starting lineup in October 2012. By then being increasingly being utilised as a right winger, he put an end to the transfer speculation by signing a new two-year contract in February 2013. Odubajo finished the 2012–13 season with 54 appearances, three goals and his performances during the campaign were recognised with the club's Young Player of the Year award.

Now an important member of manager Russell Slade's starting XI, Odubajo played a vital role in the Orient's rise to the top of the League One table during the early months of the 2013–14 season, which began with an eight-match winning streak. Though Orient's table-topping form slowly slipped away by February 2014, Odubajo scored intermittently throughout the season and his exploits saw him win the Football League Young Player of the Month award for April 2014. He salvaged a draw for Orient in the 2014 League One play-off semi-final first leg versus Peterborough United and after a 2–1 victory in the second leg, he opened the scoring versus Rotherham United in the final with a "brilliant" 25-yard volley, but the match would end with the Os succumbing to a loss on penalties. Odubajo made 57 appearances and scored 12 goals during the 2013–14 season, which proved to be his last for the club, as he departed Brisbane Road one month after the defeat. During his time with Leyton Orient, Odubajo made 116 appearances and scored 16 goals for the club.

==== St Albans City (loan) ====
On 8 October 2010, Odubajo signed for Conference South club St Albans City on a one-month work experience loan. He made four appearances and scored no goals for the club.

==== Sutton United (loan) ====
On 13 January 2012, Odubajo joined Conference South club Sutton United on a one-month loan. He made three appearances during this spell.

==== Bishop's Stortford (loan) ====
On 25 February 2012, Odubajo joined Conference North club Bishop's Stortford on a one-month loan. He scored a hattrick on his second appearance – a 5–0 win over Droylsden on 3 March – but was injured in the match and did not make any further appearances.

=== Brentford ===
On 27 June 2014, Odubajo joined Championship club Brentford on a three-year contract for an undisclosed fee, effective 1 July 2014. BBC Sport reported the fee as being a £1 million club record. Despite suffering with a "niggling injury", Odubajo scored two goals in a three-match spell in late August and early September 2014. After a run in the team on the right wing, injuries to Alan McCormack and Nico Yennaris saw Odubajo take over the right back position in late October. He went on to establish himself in the position, though in March 2015 he admitted that he continued to find combining his attacking and defensive duties difficult. By the time Brentford's season ended with defeat to Middlesbrough in the 2015 Championship play-off semi-finals, Odubajo had made 48 appearances and three goals. He departed Griffin Park in August 2015.

=== Hull City ===
On 7 August 2015, Odubajo joined Championship club Hull City on a three-year contract for a £3.5 million fee. He was manager Steve Bruce's first-choice right back and made 53 appearances during a successful 2015–16 season, which finished with victory in the 2016 Championship play-off final to clinch promotion to the Premier League. During the 2016–17 pre-season, Odubajo suffered a dislocated kneecap, which caused ligament damage. His recovery was delayed by a two fractures to the kneecap in successive incidents and he did not return to first team training until March 2018. Later that month, Odubajo played his first match at any level since May 2016, with a 45-minute appearance for the U23 team in a 2–1 victory over Burnley. Odubajo turned down the offer of a new contract and departed the club on 30 June 2018.

=== Return to Brentford ===
On 7 August 2018, Odubajo rejoined Championship club Brentford on a free transfer and signed a one-year deal, with the option of a further year. He made his second debut for the club with a start in a 3–1 EFL Cup third round defeat to Arsenal on 26 September 2018.

=== Sheffield Wednesday ===
On 11 July 2019, he signed for Sheffield Wednesday on a free transfer. He came in for a barrage of online abuse in December 2020 when he high fived a Nottingham Forest player Lewis Grabban after he scored against Wednesday.

On 20 May 2021, it was announced that he would leave Sheffield Wednesday at the end of the season, following the expiry of his contract.

=== Queens Park Rangers ===
On 30 July 2021, Odubajo joined Championship side Queens Park Rangers on a one-year deal following a successful trial.

On 20 June 2022, the club announced that Odubajo would depart the club upon the expiration of his contract.

=== Aris ===
On 8 July 2022, Odubajo joined Super League Greece club Aris on a three-year deal.

=== AEK Athens ===
On 18 July 2024, Odubajo signed for fellow Super League club, AEK Athens on a two-year deal.

== International career ==
It was reported in December 2014 that Odubajo had been invited to a training camp with the Nigeria U23 squad, which he did not attend. He won five caps for England at U20 level, which included four appearances during the 2015 Toulon Tournament.

== Personal life ==
Odubajo was born in Greenwich, London. He was orphaned at the age of 13, when his mother died of malaria. From that age he lived alone with his older brother Tom Bolarinwa, who is also a footballer. He attended Sedgehill School.

== Career statistics ==
As of match played 25 November 2021

Appearances and goals by club, season and competition
| Club | Season | League | | | FA Cup | | League Cup | | Other | | Total | |
| Club | Season | Division | Apps | Goals | Apps | Goals | Apps | Goals | Apps | Goals | Apps | Goals |
|---|---|---|---|---|---|---|---|---|---|---|---|---|
| Leyton Orient | 2010–11 | League One | 0 | 0 | — | | 0 | 0 | 0 | 0 | 0 | 0 |
| Leyton Orient | 2011–12 | League One | 3 | 1 | 1 | 0 | 0 | 0 | 1 (Note: Appearance(s) in Football League Trophy) | 0 | 5 | 1 |
| Leyton Orient | 2012–13 | League One | 44 | 2 | 4 | 0 | 1 | 0 | 5 | 1 | 54 | 3 |
| Leyton Orient | 2013–14 | League One | 46 | 10 | 3 | 0 | 2 | 0 | 6 (Note: Three appearances in Football League Trophy, three appearances and two goals in League One play-offs) | 2 | 57 | 12 |
| Leyton Orient | Total | | 93 | 13 | 8 | 0 | 3 | 0 | 12 | 3 | 116 | 16 |
| St Albans City (loan) | 2010–11 | Conference South | 1 | 0 | 3 | 0 | — | | — | | 4 | 0 |
| Sutton United (loan) | 2011–12 | Conference South | 3 | 0 | — | | — | | — | | 3 | 0 |
| Bishop's Stortford (loan) | 2011–12 | Conference North | 2 | 3 | — | | — | | — | | 2 | 3 |
| Brentford | 2014–15 | Championship | 45 | 3 | 1 | 0 | 1 | 0 | 2 (Note: Appearances in Championship play-offs) | 0 | 49 | 3 |
| Hull City | 2015–16 | Championship | 42 | 0 | 3 | 0 | 5 | 0 | 3 | 0 | 53 | 0 |
| Hull City | 2016–17 | Premier League | 0 | 0 | 0 | 0 | 0 | 0 | — | | 0 | 0 |
| Hull City | 2017–18 | Championship | 0 | 0 | 0 | 0 | 0 | 0 | — | | 0 | 0 |
| Hull City | Total | | 42 | 0 | 3 | 0 | 5 | 0 | 3 | 0 | 53 | 0 |
| Brentford | 2018–19 | Championship | 30 | 0 | 0 | 0 | 1 | 0 | — | | 31 | 0 |
| Sheffield Wednesday | 2019–20 | Championship | 22 | 0 | 1 | 0 | 1 | 0 | — | | 24 | 0 |
| Sheffield Wednesday | 2020–21 | Championship | 18 | 0 | 1 | 0 | 3 | 0 | — | | 22 | 0 |
| Sheffield Wednesday | Total | | 40 | 0 | 2 | 0 | 4 | 0 | 0 | 0 | 46 | 0 |
| Queens Park Rangers | 2021–22 | Championship | 28 | 0 | 2 | 0 | 3 | 0 | — | | 33 | 0 |
| Career total | | | 284 | 19 | 19 | 0 | 17 | 0 | 17 | 3 | 337 | 22 |

== Honours ==
Hull City

- Football League Championship play-offs: 2016

AEK Athens

- Super League Greece: 2025–26

Omonia

- Cypriot First Division: 2025–26

Individual

- Leyton Orient Young Player of the Year: 2012–13
- Leyton Orient Youth Team Player of the Year: 2011–12
- Football League Young Player of the Month: April 2014
