= Jake Larkins =

English footballer

Personal information
- Full name: Jake Larkins
- Date of birth: 11 January 1994 (age 32)
- Place of birth: Barking, England
- Position: Goalkeeper

Youth career
- ?–2012: West Ham United

Senior career*
Years	Team	Apps	(Gls)
2012–2013	West Ham United	0	(0)
2012	→ Billericay Town (loan)	1	(0)
2012	→ Grays Athletic (loan)	2	(0)
2013–2014	Leyton Orient	2	(0)
2014	Bishop's Stortford	0	(0)
2015	Bishop's Stortford	7	(0)
2015	→ Canvey Island (loan)	1	(0)
2015	Canvey Island	5	(0)
2019	Redbridge	2	(0)
- * Club domestic league appearances and goals

Jake Larkins (born 11 January 1994) is an English former footballer who last played as a goalkeeper for Redbridge.

== Career ==
=== West Ham United ===
Larkins began his career in the youth system at West Ham United, and never played in the Hammers' first team, but played regularly in the U21 side. Aged 16, he made an appearance as an unused substitute for West Ham in the Premier League, providing cover for Ruud Boffin (playing his only league match for the club) in the 1–1 draw at Blackburn Rovers on 18 December 2010.

Larkins was sent out on loan to two local non-league clubs during 2012. He began the 2012–13 season on a month-long loan with Billericay Town in the Conference South, and made his senior debut in their 2–1 opening day win over Truro City on 18 August 2012. Joining Isthmian League side Grays Athletic at the end of September 2012, he played four times for the club including a 2–1 win at Cheshunt in October. He was recalled from his loan early by West Ham.

Larkins was injured in a road accident in Harold Hill, London, on 15 April 2013, and spent the rest of the day in hospital before being released that evening.

=== Leyton Orient ===
Larkins signed for League One club Leyton Orient in June 2013 on a one-year deal, after being released by West Ham. He made his debut for the club in the first round of the FA Cup, as Orient beat Southport 5–2 on 9 November 2013.

When Orient's first-choice goalkeeper Jamie Jones suffered an injury prior to the league game at Gillingham on 26 December, Larkins made his Football League debut at the Priestfield Stadium as Orient won 2–1. At the end of the season, after appearing on the bench for the 2014 Football League One play-off final, he was released by Orient along with four other players.

=== Bishops Stortford, Canvey Island and Redbridge ===
After being released from Leyton Orient Larkins signed for Conference South Side Bishop's Stortford to gain regular football. Larkins appeared in pre-season friendlies but then left the club before the start of the season. He returned in February 2015 and made his debut in the 1–1 draw at home to Ebbsfleet United, and made eight appearances in all competitions before the end of the season. He also made one appearance on a dual registration with Canvey Island, in Canvey's 1–0 win over Billericay on 28 March.

In the summer of 2015, Larkins signed for Canvey Island, but left the club before the end of August.

He signed for Essex Senior League club Redbridge in October 2019. He made his debut in the 4–0 win over Enfield Town in the first round of the Errington Challenge Cup on 26 October.
