= Yohann Lasimant =

French footballer (born 1989)

Personal information
- Date of birth: 4 September 1989 (age 37)
- Place of birth: Besançon, France
- Height: 5 ft 11 in (1.80 m)
- Positions: Winger; midfielder

Team information
- Current team: Besançon Football

Youth career
- 1996–2002: SCC Besançon
- 2002–2006: Besançon RC
- 2006–2009: Rennes

Senior career*
Years	Team	Apps	(Gls)
2009–2010	Rennes	1	(0)
2009–2010	→ Sedan (loan)	18	(0)
2010–2011	Grenoble	32	(2)
2012	AEL	9	(0)
2013	Egri FC	6	(1)
2013–2014	Leyton Orient	11	(2)
2014–2015	Lokomotiv Plovdiv	22	(1)
2016–2017	Jura Sud	18	(10)
2017–2018	Concarneau	25	(1)
2018	Concarneau B	2	(2)
2019–2020	Racing Besançon	3	(0)
2020–	Besançon Football	19	(5)

International career
2008–2009	France U19	3	(0)
2009	France U20	3	(1)
- * Club domestic league appearances and goals as of 15:35, 26 April 2022 (UTC)

Yohann Lasimant (born 4 September 1989) is a French professional footballer who plays as a winger and midfielder for Championnat National 3 club Besançon Football.

== Club career ==
=== Rennes and Sedan ===
Born in Besançon, Lasimant began his career at local club SC Clémenceau. In 2002, he moved to the biggest club in the city, Besançon RC. He gained the attention of Rennes scouts during his time here and joined the Bretagne club's training center in 2006. He joined the club's under-18 side in 2007 and helped the club win the under-18 league championship. During the same season, he was selected to France's under-18 side. The following season, he was a part of the youth side that won the Coupe Gambardella.

At the start of the 2008–09 season, Lasimant played mainly in the reserves. He received his first call up to the senior squad by manager Guy Lacombe on 14 February 2009 in a league match against Nancy appearing on the bench in a 1–1 draw. After appearing on the bench several times for the rest of the season, he finally made his debut on the final match day of the season in a 0–4 defeat to Marseille appearing as a substitute in the 72nd minute.

He joined second division club Sedan on loan for the entire 2009–10 season, in order to receive some playing time. In his competitive debut with Sedan, he scored the club's second goal in their 2–0 win over Caen in the Coupe de la Ligue.

=== Grenoble and Larissa ===
On 23 July 2010, Lasimant signed a two-year contract with Ligue 2 club Grenoble. In February 2012 he joined Greek second division club AEL and signed a contract until the end of the season.

=== Leyton Orient ===
In July 2013, Lasimant impressed Leyton Orient manager Russell Slade with two goals in their 7–0 friendly victory over Chelmsford City. After going on trial a week later with Peterborough United, Lasimant signed a one-year contract with Orient on 16 July. He scored his first goal for the club in a 3–1 defeat at Coventry City. His second goal was a dramatic last minute winner against Gillingham. At the end of the season he was released by Orient along with four other players.

=== Besançon ===
After one year in Bulgaria, one year with Jura Sud, one year again with Concarneau and six months alone with an injury, he returned to his youth club in his hometown: Racing Besançon in February 2019. In 2020, he signed for the other club in the town, Besançon Football.

== International career ==
Lasimant has earned caps with the France under-19 team. On 25 May 2009, he was selected to the under-20 squad that participated in the 2009 Mediterranean Games. Lasimant appeared in three matches scoring one goal in a 1–0 victory over Malta.

== Career statistics ==
As of match played 23 April 2022

Appearances and goals by club, season and competition
Club	Season	League			National Cup		League Cup		Other		Total	
Club	Season	Division	Apps	Goals	Apps	Goals	Apps	Goals	Apps	Goals	Apps	Goals
Rennes	2008–09	Ligue 1	1	0	0	0	0	0	0	0	1	0
Sedan (loan)	2009–10	Ligue 2	18	0	0	0	3	2	—		21	2
Grenoble	2010–11	Ligue 2	32	2	1	0	1	0	—		34	2
Larissa	2011–12	Football League Greece	9	0	0	0	—		—		9	0
Eger	2012–13	Nemzeti Bajnokság I	6	1	0	0	1	0	—		7	1
Leyton Orient	2013–14	EFL League One	11	2	3	0	2	0	2 (Note: Appearances in the Football League Trophy)	0	18	2
Lokomotiv Plovdiv	2014–15	Bulgarian First League	12	1	3	2	—		0	0	15	3
Lokomotiv Plovdiv	2015–16	Bulgarian First League	10	0	2	0	—		—		12	0
Lokomotiv Plovdiv	Total		22	1	5	2	—		0	0	27	3
Jura Sud	2016–17	CFA	18	10	0	0	—		—		18	10
Concarneau B	2017–18	National 3	2	1	—		—		—		2	1
Concarneau	2017–18	National	25	1	3	1	—		—		28	2
Racing Besançon	2018–19	National 3	3	0	0	0	—		—		3	0
Besançon Football	2021–22	National 3	19	5	0	0	—		—		19	5
Career total			166	23	12	3	7	2	2	0	187	28

== Honours ==
Rennes U18

- Coupe Gambardella: 2007–08
