= Lloyd James (footballer) =

Welsh football player

Personal information
- Full name: Lloyd Stuart Roger James
- Date of birth: 16 February 1988 (age 38)
- Place of birth: Bristol, England
- Height: 5 ft 11 in (1.80 m)
- Positions: Midfielder; defender

Team information
- Current team: Yate Town

Youth career
- 2000–2005: Southampton

Senior career*
Years	Team	Apps	(Gls)
2005–2010	Southampton	71	(2)
2010–2012	Colchester United	51	(1)
2012	→ Crawley Town (loan)	6	(0)
2012–2016	Leyton Orient	108	(8)
2016–2018	Exeter City	83	(3)
2018–2020	Forest Green Rovers	35	(0)
2019–2020	→ Torquay United (loan)	4	(0)
2020–2022	Bath City	16	(0)
2021–2022	→ Taunton Town (loan)	23	(0)
2022–2024	Taunton Town	93	(4)
2024–2026	Yate Town		

International career^{‡}
2005–2006	Wales U17	1	(0)
2006–2007	Wales U19	11	(2)
2007–2009	Wales U21	10	(1)
- * Club domestic league appearances and goals as of 14:08, 26 June 2024 (UTC) ‡ National team caps and goals as of 20:00, 12 June 2016 (UTC)

Lloyd Stuart Roger James (born 16 February 1988) is a Welsh professional footballer who plays as a midfielder. He most recently played for Yate Town.

== Club career ==
=== Southampton ===
He attended Ashton Park School in the Ashton Gate area of Bristol. He was a member of Southampton's youth team that reached the final of the FA Youth Cup in 2005, losing on aggregate to Ipswich Town.

He made his debut for the Wales under-21 team against Cyprus U21s on 15 November 2005.

He was called into the first team squad for the FA Cup tie at Torquay United on 6 January 2007. On 9 August 2008, James started in Southampton's match against Cardiff City.

He scored his first goal in a 3–1 victory over Exeter City on Boxing Day, 2009. He scored his second goal with a 20-yard volley in a 1–1 draw with Brentford. On 15 May 2010, James was named in a list of 13 players to be released from Southampton before the start of the 2010–11 season.

=== Colchester United ===
Colchester United manager John Ward then offered him a trial for at least two weeks. James played in three games impressing enough to be offered a contract. The two-year deal was finalised on 22 July. He scored his first goals for Colchester when he scored twice in an FA Cup tie against Crewe Alexandra on 12 November 2011. His first league goal came in a 4–1 win over Bury on 10 December 2011. On 26 June 2012, James rejected the offer of a new contract with Colchester United and he left the club on 1 July upon the expiry of his current contract.

==== Crawley Town ====
On 2 March 2012, he joined League Two promotion hopefuls Crawley Town on loan. In April 2012, due to illness and not being able to hold down a regular first team place at Crawley Town, James returned to Colchester United for the remaining few games of 2011–12.

=== Leyton Orient ===
After a short trial, James signed for League One club Leyton Orient on a two-year contract. He went on to make 138 appearances and score 11 goals for the O's over four seasons at Brisbane Road.

James was released by Leyton Orient at the end of the 2015–16 season.

=== Exeter City ===
On 25 May 2016 James signed with League Two club Exeter City.

=== Forest Green Rovers ===
On 4 July 2018 he signed for League Two side Forest Green Rovers from Exeter for an undisclosed fee, agreeing a two-year contract. On 11 December 2019, James joined National League side Torquay United on a one-month loan deal. On 28 February 2020, James left Forest Green Rovers after his contract was terminated by mutual consent.

=== Later career ===
In February 2020, James signed for National League South side Bath City following his release from Forest Green Rovers.

On 17 December 2021, James joined Southern League Premier Division South side Taunton Town on loan for the remainder of the 2021–22 season. Having helped Taunton Town to promotion, James joined the club on a permanent basis in June 2022.

On 21 June 2024, James joined Southern League Division One South side Yate Town on a one year deal.

On 6 June 2026, James left Yate Town after the expiry of his contract.

== Career statistics ==
As of match played 20 April 2024

Appearances and goals by club, season and competition
Club	Season	Division	League		FA Cup		League Cup		Other		Total	
Club	Season	Division	Apps	Goals	Apps	Goals	Apps	Goals	Apps	Goals	Apps	Goals
Southampton	2007–08	Championship	0	0	0	0	0	0	0	0	0	0
Southampton	2008–09	Championship	41	0	1	0	3	0	0	0	45	0
Southampton	2009–10	League One	30	2	3	0	2	0	5 (Note: Appearance(s) in Football League Trophy)	0	40	2
Southampton	Total		71	2	4	0	5	0	5	0	85	2
Colchester United	2010–11	League One	28	0	1	0	2	0	1	0	32	0
Colchester United	2011–12	League One	23	1	2	2	1	0	1	0	27	3
Colchester United	Total		51	1	3	2	3	0	2	0	59	3
Crawley Town (loan)	2011–12	League Two	6	0	0	0	0	0	0	0	6	0
Leyton Orient	2012–13	League One	28	0	4	0	2	0	5	0	39	0
Leyton Orient	2013–14	League One	42	3	3	1	2	0	6 (Note: Three appearances in Football League Trophy, three appearances in Football League One play-offs)	1	39	5
Leyton Orient	2014–15	League One	13	1	0	0	3	0	1	0	17	1
Leyton Orient	2015–16	League Two	25	4	3	0	0	0	1	1	29	5
Leyton Orient	Total		108	8	10	1	7	0	13	2	138	11
Exeter City	2016–17	League Two	43	1	0	0	2	0	4 (Note: Two appearances in EFL Trophy, two appearances in EFL League Two play-offs)	0	49	1
Exeter City	2017–18	League Two	40	2	4	0	1	0	5 (Note: Two appearances in EFL Trophy, three appearances in EFL League Two play-offs)	0	50	2
Exeter City	Total		83	3	4	0	3	0	9	0	99	3
Forest Green Rovers	2018–19	League Two	35	0	2	0	2	0	2 (Note: One appearance in EFL Trophy, one appearance in EFL League Two play-offs)	0	41	0
Forest Green Rovers	2019–20	League Two	0	0	0	0	0	0	0	0	0	0
Forest Green Rovers	Total		35	0	2	0	2	0	2	0	41	0
Torquay United (loan)	2019–20	National League	4	0	0	0	—		1 (Note: Appearance(s) in FA Trophy)	0	5	0
Bath City	2019–20	National League South	4	0	0	0	—		0	0	4	0
Bath City	2020–21	National League South	6	0	1	0	—		1	0	7	0
Bath City	2021–22	National League South	6	0	1	0	—		0	0	7	0
Bath City	Total		16	0	2	0	—		1	0	18	0
Taunton Town	2022–23	National League South	45	0	3	1	—		3	0	51	1
Taunton Town	2023–24	National League South	43	1	0	0	—		0	0	43	1
Taunton Town	Total		88	1	3	1	—		3	0	94	2
Career total			462	15	27	4	20	0	36	2	545	24

== Honours ==
Southampton Youth

- FA Youth Cup runner-up: 2004–05

Southampton

- Football League Trophy: 2009–10
