= Mathieu Baudry =

French professional footballer (born 1988)

Personal information
- Full name: Mathieu Marien Ghislain Baudry
- Date of birth: 24 February 1988 (age 38)
- Place of birth: Le Havre, France
- Height: 6 ft 2 in (1.88 m)
- Position: Defender

Youth career
- 2004–2006: Le Havre

Senior career*
Years	Team	Apps	(Gls)
2006–2011	Troyes	24	(0)
2011–2012	Bournemouth	10	(1)
2012	→ Dagenham & Redbridge (loan)	11	(0)
2012–2016	Leyton Orient	128	(8)
2016–2018	Doncaster Rovers	53	(6)
2018–2019	Milton Keynes Dons	5	(0)
2019–2023	Swindon Town	100	(4)
Total		300	(21)
- * Club domestic league appearances and goals

Mathieu Marien Ghislain Baudry (born 24 February 1988) is a French former professional footballer who played as a defender. He started his footballing career at the Le Havre academy, where his father was a player.

== Career ==
=== Troyes ===
In January 2009, Troyes offered Baudry a contract extension to his current deal to tie him to the club until the summer of 2011. Although having only played 17 games for Troyes during his first season, Baudry was awarded 2008–09 Young Player of the Year and the club's 2008–09 Player's Player of the Year.

Baudry had a clause in his contract which allowed him to speak with other clubs following Troyes relegation to the third tier of French football. Before the 2009–10 season, a number of English clubs took an interest in taking him on trial. Baudry had a two-week trial with English club Leeds United. Baudry made his first performance in a friendly match for Leeds United in the 1–1 draw against Grimsby Town, excelling and winning praise from the Leeds manager. Simon Grayson said he was very impressed with Baudry's performance. Simon Grayson confirmed that Leeds were looking to sign Baudry providing the clubs agreed a fee.

=== Bournemouth ===
On 31 January 2011, Baudry joined English club Bournemouth in the League One along with striker Ben Williamson. He scored his first goal for the club in a 2–1 victory over Bristol Rovers. Baudry signed a new contract in the summer of 2011 to keep him at AFC Bournemouth. On 12 March 2012, Baudry joined Football League Two side Dagenham & Redbridge on a five-week loan.

=== Leyton Orient ===
On 28 June 2012, Baudry joined fellow League One club Leyton Orient on a two-year deal after his release by Bournemouth. The Frenchman signed along with Michael Symes who had also just been released by Bournemouth. Baudry scored his first league goal for Orient on 24 November 2012, heading in a Dean Cox cross in the 2–0 win over Preston North End at Brisbane Road.

On 4 August 2015 he was named the new Leyton Orient captain. In May 2016, he was released from Leyton Orient when it was announced that he would not be retained when his contract expired.

=== Doncaster Rovers ===
On 27 May 2016, Baudry signed for League Two club Doncaster Rovers, becoming Darren Ferguson's fourth summer signing at the Keepmoat Stadium. His first Doncaster goal was scored at Yeovil on 28 January 2017, the opening goal in a 0–3 victory, kicking the ball in from a free kick by Conor Grant.

=== Milton Keynes Dons ===
On 30 July 2018, Baudry joined newly relegated League Two club Milton Keynes Dons. He made his debut away to Crewe Alexandra on 18 August 2018 as an 82nd-minute substitute, but was sent off only seven minutes later for a late challenge. Following limited first team opportunities hampered by injury, Baudry was one of ten players released by the club at the end of the 2018–19 season.

=== Swindon Town ===
On 18 June 2019, Baudry joined League Two club Swindon Town on a free transfer effective from 1 July 2019 on a 1-year deal. He signed a two-year contract extension after winning EFL League Two and a further one-year contract extension to take him to the end of the 2022–2023 season.

On 30 June 2023, following the end of the season and at the end of his contract, Baudry retired from professional football due to injury, at the age of 35.

== Career statistics ==
As of 24 August 2021

Appearances and goals by club, season and competition
Club	Season	League			FA Cup		EFL Cup		Other		Total	
Club	Season	Division	Apps	Goals	Apps	Goals	Apps	Goals	Apps	Goals	Apps	Goals
Troyes	2008–09	Ligue 2	17	0	0	0	0	0	0	0	17	0
Troyes	2009–10	Championnat National	7	0	0	0	0	0	1	0	8	0
Troyes	2010–11	Ligue 2	0	0	0	0	0	0	0	0	0	0
Troyes	Total		24	0	0	0	0	0	1	0	25	0
Bournemouth	2010–11	League One	3	1	0	0	0	0	1 (Note: Appearance in League One play-offs)	0	4	1
Bournemouth	2011–12	League One	7	0	0	0	1	0	1	0	9	0
Bournemouth	Total		10	1	0	0	1	0	2	0	13	1
Dagenham & Redbridge (loan)	2011–12	League Two	11	0	0	0	0	0	0	0	11	0
Leyton Orient	2012–13	League One	24	3	4	0	2	1	5	0	35	4
Leyton Orient	2013–14	League One	39	2	2	0	1	0	4 (Note: 3 appearances in League One play-offs)	0	46	2
Leyton Orient	2014–15	League One	31	1	1	0	3	1	3	0	38	2
Leyton Orient	2015–16	League Two	34	2	3	0	1	0	0	0	38	2
Leyton Orient	Total		128	8	10	0	7	2	12	0	157	10
Doncaster Rovers	2016–17	League Two	31	5	1	0	0	0	3	0	35	5
Doncaster Rovers	2017–18	League One	22	1	2	0	0	0	2	0	26	1
Doncaster Rovers	Total		53	6	3	0	0	0	5	0	61	6
Milton Keynes Dons	2018–19	League Two	5	0	0	0	0	0	0	0	5	0
Milton Keynes Dons	Total		5	0	0	0	0	0	0	0	5	0
Swindon Town	2019–20	League Two	24	0	2	0	0	0	0	0	26	0
Swindon Town	2020–21	League One	16	1	0	0	0	0	1	0	17	1
Swindon Town	2021–22	League Two	5	0	1	0	1	0	1	0	8	0
Swindon Town	Total		44	1	3	0	1	0	2	0	51	1
Career total			286	16	16	0	9	2	22	0	333	18

== Honours ==
Troyes

- Championnat National third-place promotion: 2009–10

Doncaster Rovers

- EFL League Two third-place promotion: 2016–17

Swindon Town

- EFL League Two: 2019–20

Individual

- Troyes Player's Player of the Year: 2008–09
- Troyes Young Player of the Year: 2008–09
