= Dave Mooney =

Irish footballer

David Mooney
Personal information
- Date of birth: 30 October 1984 (age 42)
- Place of birth: Dublin, Ireland
- Position: Forward

Youth career
- Tymon Bawn
- Bushy Park Rangers

Senior career*
Years	Team	Apps	(Gls)
2004–2005	Shamrock Rovers	34	(6)
2005–2007	Longford Town	66	(26)
2008	Cork City	22	(15)
2008–2011	Reading	0	(0)
2009	→ Stockport County (loan)	2	(0)
2009	→ Norwich City (loan)	9	(3)
2009–2010	→ Charlton Athletic (loan)	30	(8)
2010–2011	→ Colchester United (loan)	39	(14)
2011–2015	Leyton Orient	140	(46)
2015–2017	Southend United	46	(14)
2017–2019	Leyton Orient	35	(4)
2018–2019	→ Royston Town (loan)	15	(7)
2019–	Lucan United		

International career
2007	Republic of Ireland U23	2	(0)
- * Club domestic league appearances and goals as of 13:38, 20 August 2019 (UTC)

David Mooney (born 30 October 1984) is an Irish footballer who has played for several clubs in Ireland and the United Kingdom. As of 2019, he was playing as a striker for Leinster Senior League side Lucan United.

== Club career ==
=== Shamrock Rovers ===
Mooney joined Shamrock Rovers, his first senior club, in 2000, while he was a pupil in Coláiste Éanna, in Dublin. He scored in every round when Rovers' won the U17 All Ireland title against Kingdom Boys in 2002. Mooney made his first team debut coming on as a sub against Longford Town on 6 April 2004. His first goal came on 24 June 2004 against Dublin City. In his fifteen months in the first team, he scored nine goals in 40 total appearances.

Due to Rovers' financial position at the time players had to be sold on and Mooney moved to Longford. His last game with Rovers was against Cork City on 22 July 2005.

=== Longford Town ===
He made his Longford debut on 6 August 2005 in a 1–0 win over Bohemians. His scoring return of 19 goals in the 2007 League of Ireland Premier Division season ensured he was top scorer in the league. Mooney's goals also led Longford Town to the final of the FAI Cup. However, Longford Town were relegated to the League of Ireland First Division, albeit with a six-point deduction, and lost the FAI Cup final to Cork City.

His form throughout the season resulted in a nomination for the PFAI Player of the Year and he won the FAI Player of the Year, as well as the Player of the Month award for August 2007.

=== Cork City ===
After Mooney's form throughout the 2007 League of Ireland season, he was linked to potential moves away from Flancare Park. He had been linked with a move to the Football League the following season with Football League Championship sides Crystal Palace and Colchester United reportedly interested in signing him. Representatives from Premier League side Fulham were said to have been in attendance at the FAI Cup final, and Leeds United manager Dennis Wise had also watched Mooney in action.

However, Mooney promised to follow his manager Alan Mathews down south if he was to stay in Ireland. He had been offered a contract by English Premiership side Blackburn Rovers, but instead signed a longer three-year contract with Cork City in January 2008, thus ending two and a half years in the midlands.

In Mooney's only season with Cork City, he was at the top of the goalscoring charts again. In a game against Derry City at The Brandywell, Mooney scored twice in a minute to bring the game (which Derry had dominated) level at 2–2, and come close to completing his hat-trick just moments later with a 30-yard effort that came back off an upright (a goal from Denis Behan eventually gave Cork all three points). Before European football came to Turner's Cross midway through the season, Mooney had scored 18 goals in total, and broken his teammate Behan's record for a scoring run by netting 11 goals in six matches. He then scored on his European debut, in a 2–2 UEFA Cup draw with Finnish side FC Haka.

=== Reading ===
However, Mooney would only last another month at Cork City. Mooney had attracted renewed interest from England. One of the clubs was Reading. On 20 August, he signed for them for a fee believed to be in the region of €260,000. Mooney was given squad number 12.

Mooney made his Reading debut in the League Cup, coming on as a substitute against Luton Town. He then made an extra time appearance in a League Cup penalty shootout defeat against Stoke City.

Mooney scored his first Reading goals on his full debut for the club, scoring twice at home to Burton Albion in a first round League Cup tie on 11 August 2009.

==== Loan to Norwich City ====
Mooney had a loan spell (cut short by injury) with League One side Stockport County midway through the 2008–09 season, but in March 2009, he moved on a month's loan to Championship strugglers Norwich City. He scored twice in his first three appearances for Norwich, including the opener in a 2–0 win over Cardiff City and the only goal of the game against fellow relegation candidates Plymouth Argyle. As a result, Mooney's loan spell at Carrow Road was extended until the end of the season. Although he would eventually total three goals in nine league games for the club, his contribution would not be enough to prevent Norwich from being relegated.

==== Charlton Athletic ====
On 16 October 2009 it was announced that Mooney would be joining League One side Charlton Athletic on an emergency loan until 1 December. He made his first team debut the next day, coming on as a late substitute in Charlton's 2–1 victory against Huddersfield Town at The Valley. After two more appearances as a substitute, Mooney was handed his first league start for the club against MK Dons at The Valley on 14 November, and scored an equalising goal in the 13th minute to set the Addicks on their way to a 5–1 victory over their promotion rivals. He opened his side's account again in a 4–2 home win over Bristol Rovers on 24 November, prompting Charlton manager Phil Parkinson to extend Mooney's loan deal with the club for another four weeks, until 28 December.

Having played a part in three of his side's goals, Mooney sustained a knee injury in the club's 4–4 draw against arch-rivals Millwall on 19 December, which saw him out of action for the rest of 2009. He returned to Reading at the end of the year, only to re-join Charlton again on 14 January in a new loan deal set to run until 11 February. However, on 28 January, Mooney's loan was extended until the end of the season.

Mooney finished with six goals from a total of 31 appearances for the Addicks, with one goal coming on his last appearance for the club, a League One play-off semi-final defeat (Charlton had won 2–1 on the night, but lost the tie after a penalty shoot-out) against Swindon Town.

==== Loan to Colchester United ====
On 5 August 2010 it was announced that Mooney would be joining League One side Colchester United on loan until 3 January 2011. He came on as a substitute in the U's first league game of the season, a 2–2 draw at Exeter City. Mooney then scored twice on his full debut for the club, with a pair of first half goals in a 3–0 League Cup win over Hereford United. He scored his first league goal for Colchester in a 1–1 draw at home to Carlisle United on 27 August.

Mooney scored twice on his first appearance in the FA Cup, a 4–3 first round win over Bradford City on 6 November.

Mooney's loan initially ran until 6 January, but he decided to return to Colchester United for the remainder of the 2010–11 season. He finished as the club's top scorer with 14 goals in all competitions as they finished in 10th place in League One. With his Reading contract expiring in June 2011, Mooney became a free agent. However, in July 2011, it was reported, after some speculation, that Mooney would not be returning to the U's on a permanent basis.

=== Leyton Orient ===
On 23 July 2011, Mooney signed his first permanent contract since 2008, a two-year deal with League One side Leyton Orient. He scored his first goal for the club in a League Cup game against Bristol Rovers, following it with a goal against Blackburn Rovers in the next round. Mooney then scored his first two league goals, away at Yeovil Town on 25 October, as the game ended 2–2.

Mooney would go on to tally 21 goals in his first two years at the club. On 21 June 2013, it was announced that Mooney had signed a new two-year contract with Leyton Orient, with manager Russell Slade hailing him as "intrinsic to the way that Leyton Orient play". He started the 2013–14 season with aplomb, scoring eight goals in the first 10 games of the League One season.

=== Southend United ===
On 3 July 2015 Mooney signed a two-year deal with League One side Southend United, moving on a free transfer. Mooney scored his first goal for Southend, a penalty, against Coventry City on 31 August 2015. He re-signed for Leyton Orient on 30 June 2017.

== Career statistics ==
Club statistics
Club	Season	League			FAI Cup/FA Cup		League of Ireland Cup/League Cup		Other		Total	
Club	Season	Division	Apps	Goals	Apps	Goals	Apps	Goals	Apps	Goals	Apps	Goals
Shamrock Rovers	2004	Irish Premier Division	?	?	?	?	?	?	-		?	?
Shamrock Rovers	2005	Irish Premier Division	?	?	?	?	?	?	-		?	?
Shamrock Rovers total			34	6	?	?	?	?	-		40	9
Longford Town	2005	Irish Premier Division	?	4	?	0	?	0	?	0	13	4
Longford Town	2006	Irish Premier Division	?	3	?	0	?	0	-		25	3
Longford Town	2007	Irish Premier Division	?	19	?	3	?	0	-		38	22
Longford Town total			66	26	?	3	?	0	?	0	76	29
Cork City	2008	Irish Premier Division	22	15	?	?	?	?	?	1	?	19
Reading	2008–09	Championship	0	0	0	0	2	0	0	0	2	0
Stockport County (loan)	2008–09	League One	2	0	0	0	0	0	0	0	2	0
Norwich City (loan)	2009	Championship	9	3	0	0	0	0	0	0	9	3
Reading	2009–10	Championship	0	0	0	0	2	2	0	0	2	2
Charlton Athletic (loan)	2009–10	League One	30	6	0	0	0	0	1	0	31	6
Colchester United (loan)	2010–11	League One	39	9	3	3	1	2	1	0	44	14
Reading total (inc. loans)			80	18	3	3	5	4	2	0	90	25
Leyton Orient	2011–12	League One	37	5	2	0	2	2	1	1	42	8
Leyton Orient	2012–13	League One	32	5	4	4	1	0	5	4	42	13
Leyton Orient	2013–14	League One	38	19	2	1	2	0	6	1	48	21
Leyton Orient	2014–15	League One	33	9	0	0	3	0	2	0	38	9
Leyton Orient total			140	38	8	5	8	2	14	6	170	51
Southend United	2015–16	League One	25	6	1	0	1	0	3	0	30	6
Career in total			245	62	12	8	14	6	19	6	427	139

== Honours ==
=== Longford Town ===
- FAI Cup runner-up: 2007

=== Individual ===
- League of Ireland Player of the Year: 2007
- League of Ireland Premier Division Top Scorer: 2007, 2008
