= Jamie Jones (footballer) =

English footballer (born 1989)

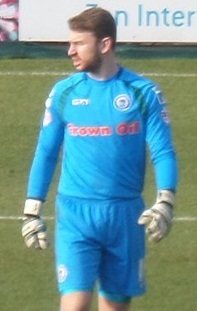
- Jones playing for Rochdale in 2015

Personal information
- Full name: Jamie Jones
- Date of birth: 18 February 1989 (age 37)
- Place of birth: Kirkby, England
- Height: 6 ft 2 in (1.88 m)
- Position: Goalkeeper

Team information
- Current team: Southampton
- Number: 31

Youth career
- –2008: Everton

Senior career*
Years	Team	Apps	(Gls)
2008–2014	Leyton Orient	151	(0)
2014–2016	Preston North End	17	(0)
2015	→ Coventry City (loan)	4	(0)
2015	→ Rochdale (loan)	13	(0)
2015	→ Colchester United (loan)	17	(0)
2016	→ Stevenage (loan)	17	(0)
2016–2017	Stevenage	36	(0)
2017–2023	Wigan Athletic	96	(0)
2023–2024	Middlesbrough	0	(0)
2024–2025	Salford City	26	(0)
2026	Warrington Town	3	(0)
2026	Southampton	0	(0)
2026–	Southampton	0	(0)
- * Club domestic league appearances and goals as of 16:14, 11 February 2026 (UTC)

Jamie Jones (born 18 February 1989) is an English professional footballer who plays as a goalkeeper for EFL Championship club Southampton.

Jones began his professional career at Leyton Orient in January 2009 before he joined Preston North End in 2014. He had loan spells with Coventry City, Rochdale, Colchester United and Stevenage before joining the latter permanently. In 2017, Jones joined Wigan Athletic and spent six years with the club. He then moved to Middlesbrough in 2023 before he joined Salford City in 2024. In his later playing career, Jones played for Warrington Town and Southampton.

== Career ==
=== Everton ===
Born in Kirkby, Merseyside, Jones signed his first professional contract with Everton on 4 July 2007. In the 2007–08 season he managed some reserve games but failed to secure a new contract at Everton and so left the club at the end of the season and signed a contract with Leyton Orient.

=== Leyton Orient ===
On 30 June 2008, Jones signed a two-year contract with League One side Leyton Orient. He signed for the club stating that he was happy to be fighting for a starting place with fellow goalkeeper Glenn Morris. Jones made his debut in a League Cup match against Southend United. He made his league debut in a 2–1 defeat to Scunthorpe United. On 10 October 2009, Jones was knocked unconscious after receiving a blow to the head by teammate Ben Chorley after a goalmouth scramble. He was stretchered off the pitch and taken to hospital. After Glenn Morris' departure from the club, Jones was promoted to the No. 1 shirt from his previous No. 12.

During a League One fixture at Swindon Town in November 2013, a spectator ran onto the pitch and aimed punches at Jones. Jones was unhurt, the match continued, and the perpetrator was arrested and later convicted.

Jones played in 179 games for Leyton Orient.

=== Preston North End ===
Jones signed a two-year deal with Preston North End on 6 June 2014 after turning down an extension of his contract at Leyton Orient.

==== Rochdale (loan) ====
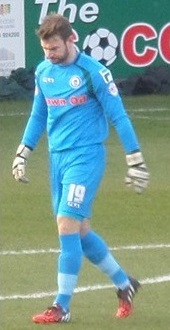
Jones playing for Rochdale in 2015

On 26 February 2015, Jones signed for Rochdale on a loan until the end of the season. Jones made his Rochdale debut on 28 February 2015, in a 1–0 defeat against Bristol City. He made his home debut on 3 March, in a 4–0 win against Crewe Alexandra, keeping a clean sheet. On 18 April, in a game against Gillingham, Jones charged out of his box and brought down Gillingham's striker Cody McDonald, with players from both sides piling into the melee which followed. It had also looked like Jones aimed a punch at one of the Gillingham's players in the scuffle and was sent off. He played his last game for the club in 2–3 defeat against Milton Keynes Dons on 25 April 2015. He played 13 times for Rochdale in the league that season, as they finished a very credible 8th place, their highest-ever league placing.

==== Colchester United (loan) ====
On 11 September 2015, Jones joined League One side Colchester United on a 3-month loan.

=== Wigan Athletic ===
On 7 August 2017, Jones signed for League One side Wigan Athletic on a one-year contract after rejecting a new contract at Stevenage. Wigan entered into contract talks with him at the end of the 2017–18 season. He sold his League One winners medal to help raise money for the club, with Wigan being in administration – only for the fan that bought it to give it back to him as a gift. Jones also became the club's captain, starting with 2020–21 season.

Entering the 2021–22 season, Jones was no longer the first-choice goalkeeper, as summer signing Ben Amos from Charlton had taken over the role. In addition, the on-field captaincy was transferred away from Jones to Tendayi Darikwa by manager Leam Richardson as part of changes entering his first full season in charge. Jones was the goalkeeper for Wigan's League Cup campaign, which began with consecutive penalty shootout wins over Hull and Bolton. Jones took a penalty in both shootouts, and saved one in the second shootout.

At the end of the 2022–23 season, he was offered a new contract with the club. On 17 July 2023, his departure was announced.

=== Middlesbrough ===
On 18 July 2023, Jones signed a one-year contract with Championship club Middlesbrough. On 17 May 2024, the club said the keeper would remain to receive treatment on a shoulder injury sustained during the season, with a view to extending his stay.

=== Salford City ===
On 18 July 2024, Jones joined League Two club Salford City. He was offered a new contract at the end of the 2024–25 season.

=== Warrington Town ===
On 16 January 2026, Jones joined Northern Premier League Premier Division club Warrington Town. He made three league appearances during his short spell at the club.

=== Southampton ===
On 11 February 2026, Jones signed a contract until the end of the 2025–26 season with Southampton due to an injury to Alex McCarthy. Following the conclusion of the season, he was released from Southampton.

On 1 September 2026, Jones rejoined the club on a one-year contract.

== Career statistics ==
As of 31 January 2026

Appearances and goals by club, season and competition
Club	Season	League			FA Cup		League Cup		Other		Total	
Club	Season	Division	Apps	Goals	Apps	Goals	Apps	Goals	Apps	Goals	Apps	Goals
Leyton Orient	2008–09	League One	20	0	0	0	0	0	2 (Note: Appearances in the Football League Trophy)	0	22	0
Leyton Orient	2009–10	League One	36	0	0	0	1	0	2	0	39	0
Leyton Orient	2010–11	League One	35	0	4	0	2	0	1	0	42	0
Leyton Orient	2011–12	League One	6	0	0	0	0	0	0	0	6	0
Leyton Orient	2012–13	League One	26	0	2	0	1	0	4	0	33	0
Leyton Orient	2013–14	League One	28	0	1	0	2	0	6 (Note: Three appearances in the Football League Trophy and three in the League One play-offs)	0	37	0
Leyton Orient	Total		151	0	7	0	6	0	15	0	179	0
Preston North End	2014–15	League One	17	0	1	0	2	0	0	0	20	0
Preston North End	2015–16	Championship	0	0	0	0	0	0	0	0	0	0
Preston North End	Total		17	0	1	0	2	0	0	0	20	0
Coventry City (loan)	2014–15	League One	4	0	—		—		0	0	4	0
Rochdale (loan)	2014–15	League One	13	0	—		—		0	0	13	0
Colchester United (loan)	2015–16	League One	17	0	1	0	0	0	0	0	18	0
Stevenage (loan)	2015–16	League Two	17	0	—		0	0	0	0	17	0
Stevenage	2016–17	League Two	36	0	1	0	2	0	1 (Note: Appearances in the EFL Trophy)	0	40	0
Stevenage	Total		53	0	1	0	2	0	1	0	57	0
Wigan Athletic	2017–18	League One	15	0	2	0	1	0	0	0	19	0
Wigan Athletic	2018–19	Championship	12	0	1	0	1	0	0	0	14	0
Wigan Athletic	2019–20	Championship	7	0	0	0	1	0	0	0	8	0
Wigan Athletic	2020–21	League One	45	0	0	0	1	0	0	0	46	0
Wigan Athletic	2021–22	League One	0	0	5	0	2	0	5	0	12	0
Wigan Athletic	2022–23	Championship	17	0	0	0	1	0	0	0	18	0
Wigan Athletic	Total		96	0	8	0	7	0	6	0	117	0
Middlesbrough	2023–24	Championship	0	0	0	0	0	0	—		0	0
Salford City	2024–25	League Two	26	0	0	0	0	0	0	0	26	0
Warrington Town	2025–26	Northern Premier League	3	0	0	0	—		0	0	3	0
Southampton	2025–26	Championship	0	0	0	0	—		0	0	0	0
Southampton	2026–27	Championship	0	0	0	0	—		—		0	0
Southampton	Total		0	0	0	0	0	0	0	0	0	0
Career total			380	0	18	0	17	0	22	0	437	0

== Honours ==
Wigan Athletic

- EFL League One: 2017–18
