= 2015–16 Leyton Orient F.C. season =

Leyton Orient F.C.
2015–16 season
- Chairman: Francesco Becchetti
- Head Coach: Ian Hendon (until 18 January 2016); Andy Hessenthaler (caretaker) (from 18 January 2016 to 21 January 2016); Kevin Nolan (Player/Manager) (from 21 January 2016 to 12 April 2016); Andy Hessenthaler (caretaker) (from 12 April 2016)
- Stadium: Brisbane Road
- League Two: 8th
- FA Cup: Second round (eliminated by Scunthorpe United)
- League Cup: First round (eliminated by Milton Keynes Dons)
- League Trophy: First round (eliminated by Luton Town)
Home colours	Away colours	Third colours

The 2015–16 Leyton Orient F.C. season was the 117th season in the history of Leyton Orient Football Club, their 100th in the Football League, and the first season of their return to the fourth tier of the English football league system.

== Transfers ==
=== Transfers in ===
Date from	Position	Nationality	Name	From	Fee	Ref.
1 July 2015	DF	ENG	Sean Clohessy	(England) Colchester United	Free transfer	
1 July 2015	FW	ENG	Paul McCallum	(England) West Ham United	Free transfer	
1 July 2015	MF	ENG	Sammy Moore	(England) AFC Wimbledon	Free transfer	
1 July 2015	MF	ENG	Blair Turgott	(England) Coventry City	Free transfer	
6 July 2015	FW	ENG	Ollie Palmer	(England) Mansfield Town	Undisclosed	
8 July 2015	FW	POR	Sandro Semedo	Academy	Trainee	
27 July 2015	GK	AUS	Alex Cisak	(England) Burnley	Undisclosed	
27 July 2015	DF	IRL	Alan Dunne	(England) Millwall	Free transfer	
27 July 2015	DF	ENG	Connor Essam	(England) Dover Athletic	£20,000	
27 July 2015	DF	ENG	Frazer Shaw	(England) Dulwich Hamlet	Free transfer	
20 November 2015	DF	FRA	Jean-Yves Mvoto	Free agent	Free transfer	
20 January 2016	MF	FRA	Nigel Atangana	(England) Portsmouth	Undisclosed	
21 January 2016	MF	ENG	Kevin Nolan	Free Agent	Free transfer	
22 January 2016	FW	CIV	Armand Gnanduillet	(England) Chesterfield	Undisclosed	
1 February 2016	DF	ENG	Nicky Hunt	(England) Mansfield Town	Undisclosed	

Total spending: ▼£20,000

=== Transfers out ===
Date from	Position	Nationality	Name	To	Fee	Ref.
1 June 2015	GK	ENG	Adam Legzdins	(England) Birmingham City	Released	(Note: Following Legzdins' release he joined Birmingham City.)
1 July 2015	DF	SCO	Scott Cuthbert	(England) Luton Town	Free transfer	
1 July 2015	FW	ENG	Chris Dagnall	(India) Kerala Blasters	Free transfer	
1 July 2015	FW	JAM	Kevin Lisbie	(England) Barnet	Free transfer	
1 July 2015	DF	ENG	Elliot Omozusi	(England) Cambridge United	Free transfer	
1 July 2015	DF	ENG	Gary Sawyer	(England) Plymouth Argyle	Free transfer	
2 July 2015	FW	IRL	Dave Mooney	(England) Southend United	Free transfer	
6 July 2015	FW	ENG	Darius Henderson	(England) Scunthorpe United	Released	(Note: Following Henderson's release he joined Scunthorpe United.)
8 July 2015	MF	FRA	Romain Vincelot	(England) Coventry City	£25,000	
9 July 2015	FW	ENG	Shaun Batt	(England) Barnet	Free transfer	
24 July 2015	DF	ENG	Nathan Clarke	(England) Bradford City	Mutual consent	(Note: Following Clarke's decision to leave he joined Bradford City.)
7 August 2015	MF	ENG	Josh Wright	(England) Gillingham	Free transfer	
28 August 2015	DF	AUS	Shane Lowry	(England) Birmingham City	Mutual consent	(Note: Following Lowry's decision to leave he joined Birmingham City.)
11 January 2016	MF	ENG	Harry Lee	(England) Welling United	Mutual consent	
20 January 2016	DF	FRA	Jean-Yves Mvoto	(Poland) Zawisza Bydgoszcz	Mutual consent	(Note: Following M'voto's departure, he joined Zawisza Bydgoszcz.)

Total income: ▲£25,000

=== Loans in ===
Date from	Position	Nationality	Name	From	Date until	Ref.
28 August 2015	DF	ENG	Joe Maguire	(England) Liverpool	28 September 2015	
1 September 2015	MF	ENG	Jack Payne	(England) Peterborough United	End of Season	
2 October 2015	DF	ENG	Adam Chicksen	(England) Brighton & Hove Albion	2 November 2015	
9 October 2015	FW	ENG	John Marquis	(England) Millwall	15 January 2016	
19 November 2015	DF	ENG	Cole Kpekawa	(England) Queens Park Rangers	1 February 2016	(Note: Kpekawa's initial one-month loan was extended by a further month on 17 December 2015, a second time until 1 March 2016 before being recalled by QPR on 1 February 2016)
2 January 2016	MF	ATG	Calaum Jahraldo-Martin	(England) Hull City	End of Season	(Note: Jahraldo-Martin's initial one-month loan was extended until the End of the Season on 1 February 2016)
27 January 2016	DF	ENG	Shaun Brisley	(England) Peterborough United	End of Season	
1 February 2016	DF	ENG	Jerome Binnom-Williams	(England) Crystal Palace	End of Season	
10 March 2016	GK	ENG	David Gregory	(England) Crystal Palace	8 April 2016	
17 March 2016	DF	ENG	Peter Ramage	(England) Coventry City	End of Season	(Note: Ramage's initial one-month loan was extended until the End of the Season on 16 April 2016)

=== Loans out ===
Date from	Position	Nationality	Name	To	Date until	Ref.
15 August 2015	MF	ENG	Harry Lee	(England) Welling United	9 January 2016	(Note: On 17 September 2015, Lee's loan at Welling was extended until 9 January 2016.)
2 September 2015	GK	ENG	Gary Woods	(Scotland) Ross County	End of Season	(Note: On 6 January 2016, Woods' loan at Ross County was extended until the End of the Season.)
1 October 2015	FW	NGA	Victor Adeboyejo	(England) Hemel Hempstead Town	Youth Loan	
1 October 2015	MF	POR	Sandro Semedo	(England) Welling United	9 January 2016	
1 October 2015	MF	ENG	Montel Agyemang	(England) Grays Athletic	Youth Loan	
21 October 2015	FW	NGA	Victor Adeboyejo	(England) Heybridge Swifts	Youth Loan	
21 October 2015	DF	ENG	Jack Humphreys	(England) Heybridge Swifts	Youth Loan	
12 February 2016	MF	POR	Sandro Semedo	(England) Chelmsford City	End of Season	
29 February 2016	MF	ENG	Freddy Moncur	(England) Wingate & Finchley	Work experience loan	
4 March 2016	DF	ENG	Aron Pollock	(England) Wingate & Finchley	Work experience loan	
4 March 2016	FW	ENG	Scott Kashket	(England) Welling United	4 April 2016	
19 March 2016	DF	ENG	Jack Humphreys	(England) Histon	Work experience loan	
19 March 2016	DF	ENG	Sam Ling	(England) Histon	Work experience loan	
22 March 2016	MF	ZIM	Bradley Pritchard	(England) Stevenage	22 April 2016	
23 March 2016	DF	ENG	Connor Essam	(England) Dover Athletic	End of Season	

== Results ==
=== Pre-season friendlies ===
On 1 June 2015, Leyton Orient announced their first two pre-season friendlies against Braintree Town and Woking. A third friendly against Colchester United was added to the schedule. On 1 July 2015, Leyton Orient announced they will face Huddersfield Town during their stay in Spain. On 8 July 2015, Orient confirmed a friendly away to Bishop's Stortford. On 15 July 2015, Leyton Orient announced they will face Middlesbrough in a behind-closed-doors friendly. On 24 July 2015, O's announced a friendly against Southend United.

10 July 2015 Friendly	Braintree Town	2–1	Leyton Orient	Cressing Road, Braintree
19:45 BST	Davis 35' (pen.); Marks 88'	Report	McCallum 18'	Attendance: 729

15 July 2015 Friendly	Middlesbrough	3–1	Leyton Orient	La Cala Resort, Mijas
17:30 CEST	Adomah 44'; Forshaw 52'; Kike 80'	Report	McCallum 61'

18 July 2015 Friendly	Huddersfield Town	2–0	Leyton Orient	La Cala Resort, Mijas
11:00 CEST	Lolley 35'; Baudry 67' (o.g.)	Report

20 July 2015 Friendly	Los Iberos	0–5	Leyton Orient	La Cala Resort, Mijas
12:00 CEST		Report	Palmer; McCallum; Cox

25 July 2015 Friendly	Colchester United	0–3	Leyton Orient	Colchester Community Stadium, Colchester
15:00 BST		Report	McCallum 32', 47'; Kashket 76'	Attendance: 1,084 (303 O's fans)

28 July 2015 Friendly	Woking	0–4	Leyton Orient	Kingfield Stadium, Woking
19:45 BST		Report	Palmer 3'; Simpson 14', 45'; Kashket 19'	Attendance: 871

1 August 2015 Friendly	Bishop's Stortford	2–4	Leyton Orient	ProKit UK Stadium, Bishop's Stortford
15:00 BST	Fanimo 57', 81'	Report	McAnuff 13'; Kashket 34', 63'; Palmer 39'

2 August 2015 Friendly	Southend United	0–1	Leyton Orient	Roots Hall, Southend-on-Sea
13:00 BST		Report	McCallum 21'

=== League Two ===
On 17 June 2015, the fixtures for the forthcoming season were announced.

8 August 2015 1	Leyton Orient	2–0	Barnet	Leyton
15:00 BST	Simpson 74'; McCallum 75'	Report		Stadium: Matchroom Stadium; Attendance: 6,151; Referee: Iain Williamson

15 August 2015 2	Dagenham & Redbridge	1–3	Leyton Orient	Dagenham
15:00 BST	Cureton 90'	Report	McCallum 19'; James 28' (pen.); Cox 56'	Stadium: Victoria Road; Attendance: 3,336; Referee: Gavin Ward

18 August 2015 3	Leyton Orient	3–0	Stevenage	Leyton
19:45 BST	Simpson 74'; Turgott 84'; Palmer 90'	Report		Stadium: Matchroom Stadium; Attendance: 4,949; Referee: Chris Sarginson

22 August 2015 4	Newport County	2–3	Leyton Orient	Newport
15:00 BST	Boden 41'; Byrne 42'	Report	McCallum 4'; Simpson 7'; Cox 59'	Stadium: Rodney Parade; Attendance: 2,779; Referee: Brendan Malone

29 August 2015 5	Leyton Orient	2–0	Bristol Rovers	Leyton
15:00 BST	James 23' (pen.); Simpson 45'	Report		Stadium: Matchroom Stadium; Attendance: 5,777; Referee: Darren Drysdale

5 September 2015 6	Exeter City	4–0	Leyton Orient	Exeter
15:00 BST	Nichols 5' (pen.), 56' (pen.); Nicholls 37'; Wheeler 77'	Report		Stadium: St James Park; Attendance: 3,648; Referee: Kevin Johnson

12 September 2015 7	Cambridge United	1–1	Leyton Orient	Cambridge
15:00 BST	Blyth 53'	Report	Simpson 87'	Stadium: Abbey Stadium; Attendance: 5,821; Referee: Oliver Langford

19 September 2015 8	Leyton Orient	1–1	Wycombe Wanderers	Leyton
15:00 BST	Simpson 66'	Report	Bloomfield 40'	Stadium: Matchroom Stadium; Attendance: 5,946; Referee: James Linington

26 September 2015 9	Northampton Town	1–1	Leyton Orient	Northampton
15:00 BST	Calvert-Lewin 90'	Report	Cox 90'	Stadium: Sixfields Stadium; Attendance: 5,061; Referee: Michael Bull

29 September 2015 10	Leyton Orient	1–2	Carlisle United	Leyton
21:45 BST	Baudry 64'	Report	Asamoah 62'; Sweeney 72'	Stadium: Matchroom Stadium; Attendance: 4,408; Referee: Charles Breakspear

3 October 2015 11	Leyton Orient	3–1	Notts County	Leyton
17:00 BST	Moore 16', 84'; Simpson 79'	Report	Stead 46'	Stadium: Matchroom Stadium; Attendance: 5,193; Referee: Darren England

10 October 2015 12	Crawley Town	3–2	Leyton Orient	Crawley
17:00 BST	Deacon 27'; Hancox 37'; Walton 45+1' (pen.)	Report	Simpson 8', 82'; Dunne (red card) 45'	Stadium: Checkatrade.com Stadium; Attendance: 2,575; Referee: Kevin Wright

17 October 2015 13	Leyton Orient	2–2	Oxford United	Leyton
17:00 BST	Simpson 64'; Kashket 90+1'	Report	Roofe 16'; Lundstram 33'; Graham (yellow card) 55' (yellow-red card) 67'	Stadium: Matchroom Stadium; Attendance: 6,296; Referee: Ross Joyce

20 October 2015 15	Luton Town	1–1	Leyton Orient	Luton
21:45 BST	Marriott 38'	Report	Simpson 47'	Stadium: Kenilworth Road; Attendance: 8022; Referee: Tim Robinson

24 October 2015 16	Morecambe	0–1	Leyton Orient	Morecambe
15:00 BST		Report	Payne 28'	Stadium: Globe Arena; Attendance: 2105

31 October 2015 17	Leyton Orient	0–1	Accrington Stanley	Leyton
15:00 BST		Report	Windass 25'	Stadium: Matchroom Stadium; Attendance: 4701

15 November 2015 18	Hartlepool United	3–1	Leyton Orient	Hartlepool
15:00 BST	Oyenuga 20' (pen.); Gray 70', 85'	Report	Pritchard 13'	Stadium: Victoria Park; Attendance: 4081

21 November 2015 19	Leyton Orient	3–2	York City	Leyton
15:00 BST	Baudry 21'; Simpson 45+2', 64'	Report	Morris 45+4'; Oliver 86'	Stadium: Matchroom Stadium; Attendance: 4897

24 November 2015 19	Plymouth Argyle	1–1	Leyton Orient	Plymouth
19:45 BST	Nelson 81'	Report	Simpson 4'	Stadium: Home Park; Attendance: 6469

28 November 2015 20	Leyton Orient	1–1	AFC Wimbledon	Leyton
15:00 BST	Simpson 10'	Report	Akinfenwa 80'	Stadium: Matchroom Stadium; Attendance: 6024

12 December 2015 21	Mansfield Town	1–1	Leyton Orient	Mansfield
15:00 BST	Lambe 40'	Report	Simpson 12'	Stadium: Field Mill; Attendance: 2935

19 December 2015 22	Leyton Orient	1–1	Yeovil	Leyton
15:00 BST	McAnuff 74'	Report	Zoko 45+3'	Stadium: Matchroom Stadium; Attendance: 4686

26 December 2015 23	Leyton Orient	3–2	Portsmouth	Leyton
15:00 BST	Simpson 23' (pen.); Palmer 45+1', 52'	Report	Evans 4', 66'	Stadium: Matchroom Stadium; Attendance: 5848

28 December 2015 24	Bristol Rovers	2–1	Leyton Orient	Bristol
15:00 BST	Gaffney 31', 53'	Report	Simpson 45+1'	Stadium: Memorial Stadium; Attendance: 9836

2 January 2016 25	Stevenage	2–2	Leyton Orient	Stevenage
15:00 BST	Gnanduillet 75', 79'	Report	Simpson 60' (pen.), 90+3'	Stadium: Broadhall Way; Attendance: 4022

16 January 2016 26	Leyton Orient	1–3	Exeter City	Leyton
15:00 BST	Palmer 1'	Report	Stockley 14', 32'; Nichols 23'	Stadium: Matchroom Stadium; Attendance: 5758

23 January 2016 27	Wycombe Wanderers	0–2	Leyton Orient	Wycombe
15:00 BST		Report	Simpson 64'; Jahraldo-Martin 89'	Stadium: Adams Park; Attendance: 4,432

26 January 2016 28	Leyton Orient	1–0	Newport County	Leyton
15:00 BST	Simpson 85' (pen.)	Report		Stadium: Matchroom Stadium; Attendance: 4,209

30 January 2016 29	Leyton Orient	1–3	Cambridge United	Leyton
15:00 BST	Gnanduillet 57'	Report	Williamson 10', 53'; Spencer 63'	Stadium: Matchroom Stadium; Attendance: 6,526

6 February 2016 30	Portsmouth	0–1	Leyton Orient	Portsmouth
15:00 BST		Report	McAnuff 53'	Stadium: Fratton Park; Attendance: 15,643

13 February 2016 31	Leyton Orient	0–4	Northampton Town	Leyton
15:00 BST		Report	McDonald 54'; Holmes 64'; Collins 84', 90+1'	Stadium: Matchroom Stadium; Attendance: 6,131; Referee: Paul Tierney

20 February 2016 32	Notts County	0–1	Leyton Orient	Nottingham
15:00 BST		Report	Nolan (yellow card) 64'; Brisley 76'	Stadium: Meadow Lane; Attendance: 4,878; Referee: Andy Woolmer

27 February 2016 33	Leyton Orient	2–0	Crawley Town	Leyton
15:00 BST	Gnanduillet 42', 71'	Report		Stadium: Brisbane Road; Attendance: 4,610; Referee: Lee Collins

1 March 2016 34	Carlisle United	2–2	Leyton Orient	Carlisle
19:45 BST	Gillesphey 17'; Raynes 84'	Report	Simpson 50'; Palmer 72'	Stadium: Brunton Park; Attendance: 3,721

5 March 2016 35	Leyton Orient	0–1	Luton Town	Leyton
15:00 BST		Report	Marriott 27'	Stadium: Brisbane Road; Attendance: 5,684

12 March 2016 36	Oxford United	0–1	Leyton Orient	Oxford
15:00 BST		Report	McAnuff 74'; Baudry (red card) 90+3'	Stadium: Kassam Stadium; Attendance: 7,102

19 March 2016 37	Leyton Orient	1–0	Morecambe	Leyton
15:00 BST	Simpson (penalty missed) 13'; Edwards 80' (o.g.)	Report	Roche (red card) 12'	Stadium: Brisbane Road; Attendance: 4,442

25 March 2016 38	Accrington Stanley	1–0	Leyton Orient	Accrington
15:00 BST	Brown 51'	Report		Stadium: Wham Stadium; Attendance: 2,783

28 March 2016 39	Leyton Orient	0–2	Hartlepool United	Leyton
15:00 BST		Report	Paynter 49'; Thomas 69'	Stadium: Brisbane Road; Attendance: 5,543

2 April 2016 40	York City	1–1	Leyton Orient	York
15:00 BST	Fewster 17'; Boyle (red card) 74'	Report	James 75'	Stadium: Bootham Crescent; Attendance: 3,234

9 April 2016 41	Barnet	3–0	Leyton Orient	Edgware
15:00 BST	Akinde 25', 57'; Togwell 49'	Report		Stadium: The Hive Stadium; Attendance: 3,401

16 April 2016 42	Leyton Orient	3–2	Dagenham & Redbridge	Leyton
15:00 BST	Simpson 3', 45+1'; Gnanduillet 65'	Report	Cureton 59'; Dikamona 60'	Stadium: Brisbane Road; Attendance: 5,696

19 April 2016 43	Leyton Orient	1–3	Plymouth Argyle	Leyton
19:45 BST	James 82' (pen.)	Report	Hartley 45+2'; Jervis 78', 90+2'	Stadium: Brisbane Road; Attendance: 4,908

23 April 2016 44	AFC Wimbledon	1–0	Leyton Orient	Norbiton
15:00 BST	Taylor 17'	Report		Stadium: Kingsmeadow; Attendance: 4,732

30 April 2016 45	Leyton Orient	1–0	Mansfield Town	Leyton
15:00 BST	Palmer 48'	Report		Stadium: Brisbane Road; Attendance: 4,257

7 May 2016 46	Yeovil Town	0–1	Leyton Orient	Yeovil
15:00 BST		Report	Palmer 87'	Stadium: Huish Park; Attendance: 4,163

=== FA Cup ===
7 November 2015 First round	Leyton Orient	6–1	Staines Town	Leyton
15:00 BST	Palmer 8', 13'; Cox 12', 33'; Marquis 89'; Clohessy 90+4'	Report	Purse 23'	Stadium: Matchroom Stadium; Attendance: 2,287

5 December 2015 Second Round	Leyton Orient	0–0	Scunthorpe United	Leyton
15:00 BST		Report		Stadium: Matchroom Stadium; Attendance: 2,540

15 December 2015 Second Round Replay	Scunthorpe United	3–0	Leyton Orient	Scunthorpe
15:00 BST	Mvoto 55' (o.g.); King 60'; Adelakun 90+4'	Report		Stadium: Glanford Park; Attendance: 3,082

=== League Cup ===
On 16 June 2015, the first round draw was made, Leyton Orient were drawn away against Milton Keynes Dons.

11 August 2015 First round	Milton Keynes Dons	2–1	Leyton Orient	Denbigh
19:45 BST	Baudry 90' (o.g.); Baker 90'	Report	Lewington 36' (o.g.)	Stadium: Stadium mk Attendance: 5,444; Referee: Simon Hooper

=== Football League Trophy ===
On 8 August 2015, live on Soccer AM the draw for the first round of the Football League Trophy was drawn by Toni Duggan and Alex Scott. O's will travel to Luton Town.

1 September 2015 First Round	Luton Town	2–1	Leyton Orient	Luton
19:45 BST	Green 29'; O'Donnell 90'; McNulty (yellow card) 38'; Marriott (red card) 81'		James (yellow card) 38' (goal) 59'; Shaw (yellow card) 89'	Stadium: Kenilworth Road; Attendance: 1,953

== League table ==
Pos	Team	Pld	W	D	L	GF	GA	GD	Pts	Promotion, qualification or relegation
6	Portsmouth	46	21	15	10	75	44	+31	78	Qualification for League Two play-offs (Note: Four teams play for one spot and promotion to Football League One.)
7	AFC Wimbledon (O, P)	46	21	12	13	64	50	+14	75	Qualification for League Two play-offs
8	Leyton Orient	46	19	12	15	60	61	−1	69	
9	Cambridge United	46	18	14	14	66	55	+11	68	
10	Carlisle United	46	17	16	13	67	62	+5	67	

Updated to match(es) played on 7 May 2016. Source: BBC Sport
Rules for classification: 1) Points; 2) Goal difference; 3) Number of goals scored
(O) Play-off winners; (P) Promoted

== 2015–16 squad statistics ==
As of 7 May 2016

No.	Pos	Nat	Player	Total		League Two		FA Cup		League Cup		Other	
No.	Pos	Nat	Player	Apps	Goals	Apps	Goals	Apps	Goals	Apps	Goals	Apps	Goals
1	GK	(Australia) AUS	Alex Cisak	46	0	43	0	2	0	1	0	0	0
2	DF	(England) ENG	Sean Clohessy	47	1	41+1	0	3	1	1	0	1	0
3	DF	(England) ENG	Frazer Shaw	30	0	20+5	0	3	0	0+1	0	1	0
5	DF	(Republic of Ireland) IRL	Alan Dunne	10	0	3+5	0	1	0	1	0	0	0
6	DF	(France) FRA	Mathieu Baudry	38	2	33+1	2	3	0	1	0	0	0
7	MF	(England) ENG	Dean Cox	16	5	12+2	3	1	2	1	0	0	0
8	MF	(Wales) WAL	Lloyd James	28	5	17+8	4	2	0	0	0	1	1
9	FW	(England) ENG	Ollie Palmer	50	9	25+20	7	3	2	1	0	1	0
10	FW	(England) ENG	Paul McCallum	12	3	9+2	3	0	0	0	0	1	0
11	MF	(Jamaica) JAM	Jobi McAnuff	18	3	13+3	3	2	0	0	0	0	0
12	MF	(England) ENG	Jack Payne (on loan from Peterborough United )	32	1	26+3	1	3	0	0	0	0	0
14	MF	(England) ENG	Sammy Moore	32	2	27+3	2	0	0	1	0	1	0
15	MF	(France) FRA	Nigel Atangana	16	0	16	0	0	0	0	0	0	0
16	DF	(England) ENG	Shaun Brisley (on loan from Peterborough United)	16	1	16	1	0	0	0	0	0	0
17	MF	(England) ENG	Blair Turgott	36	1	10+21	1	2+1	0	1	0	1	0
18	MF	(Zimbabwe) ZIM	Bradley Pritchard	33	1	24+5	1	2	0	1	0	1	0
19	MF	(England) ENG	Scott Kashket	19	1	1+14	1	0+2	0	1	0	1	0
20	DF	(England) ENG	Jerome Binnom-Williams (on loan from Crystal Palace)	13	0	12+1	0	0	0	0	0	0	0
21	GK	(England) ENG	Charlie Grainger	4	0	2	0	1	0	0	0	1	0
22	MF	(England) ENG	Sandro Semedo	4	0	2+1	0	0	0	0	0	0+1	0
26	FW	(Nigeria) NGR	Victor Adeboyejo	3	0	0+1	0	0+2	0	0	0	0	0
27	FW	(England) ENG	Jay Simpson	47	25	44	25	2	0	0+1	0	0	0
28	DF	(England) ENG	Myles Judd	1	0	0	0	0	0	0	0	0+1	0
29	GK	(England) ENG	Sam Sargeant	1	0	1	0	0	0	0	0	0	0
30	MF	(Antigua and Barbuda) ANT	Calaum Jahraldo-Martin (on loan from Hull City)	15	1	8+7	1	0	0	0	0	0	0
31	DF	(England) ENG	Aron Pollock	2	0	2	0	0	0	0	0	0	0
32	FW	(Ivory Coast) CIV	Armand Gnanduillet	17	4	8+9	4	0	0	0	0	0	0
34	DF	(England) ENG	Nicky Hunt	16	0	16	0	0	0	0	0	0	0
35	GK	(England) ENG	David Gregory (on loan from Crystal Palace)	0	0	0	0	0	0	0	0	0	0
36	DF	(England) ENG	Peter Ramage (on loan from Coventry City)	8	0	8	0	0	0	0	0	0	0
37	FW	(England) ENG	Josh Koroma	3	0	0+3	0	0	0	0	0	0	0
44	MF	(England) ENG	Kevin Nolan	14	0	12+2	0	0	0	0	0	0	0
Players who left the club during the season
15	DF	(France) FRA	Jean-Yves Mvoto	10	0	8	0	2	0	0	0	0	0
16	MF	(England) ENG	Harry Lee	0	0	0	0	0	0	0	0	0	0
20	DF	(England) ENG	Joe Maguire (on loan from Liverpool)	1	0	0	0	0	0	0	0	1	0
20	DF	(England) ENG	Adam Chicksen (on loan from Brighton & Hove Albion)	6	0	6	0	0	0	0	0	0	0
20	DF	(England) ENG	Cole Kpekawa (on loan from Queens Park Rangers)	9	0	8+1	0	0	0	0	0	0	0
32	FW	(England) ENG	John Marquis (on loan from Millwall)	15	1	9+4	0	0+2	1	0	0	0	0
Out on Loan
4	DF	(England) ENG	Connor Essam	26	0	23+1	0	0	0	1	0	1	0
23	MF	(England) ENG	Freddy Moncur	2	0	0	0	0+1	0	0	0	0+1	0
24	MF	(England) ENG	Montel Agyemang	0	0	0	0	0	0	0	0	0	0
25	DF	(England) ENG	Sam Ling	0	0	0	0	0	0	0	0	0	0
33	GK	(England) ENG	Gary Woods	0	0	0	0	0	0	0	0	0	0
-	DF	(England) ENG	Jack Humphrey	0	0	0	0	0	0	0	0	0	0
