= 2014–15 Leyton Orient F.C. season =

Leyton Orient F.C.
2014–15 season
- Chairman: Francesco Becchetti
- Manager: Russell Slade (until 25 September 2014); Kevin Nugent (caretaker, 25 September – 26 October); Mauro Milanese (26 October – 8 December); Fabio Liverani (from 8 December)
- Stadium: Brisbane Road
- League One: 23rd (relegated)
- FA Cup: First round (eliminated by Oldham Athletic)
- League Cup: Third round (eliminated by Sheffield United)
- League Trophy: Southern section semi-final (eliminated by Gillingham)
- Top goalscorer: League: Chris Dagnall (11); All: Chris Dagnall (13)
- Highest home attendance: 7,249 (25 April v Sheffield United)
- Lowest home attendance: 3,534 (10 February v Notts County)
- Average home league attendance: 5,023
Home colours	Away colours	Third colours

The 2014–15 Leyton Orient F.C. season was the 116th season in the history of Leyton Orient Football Club, their 99th in the Football League, and ninth consecutive season in the third tier of the English football league system.

At the end of the season Orient were relegated to League Two after failing to beat Swindon Town on the final day of the season, with Colchester United reaching safety by beating Preston North End.

== 2014–15 squad statistics ==
As of 3 May 2015

- Figures in brackets indicate appearances as a substitute
- Players in italics are loan players

No.	Pos.	Name	League		FA Cup		League Cup		Other		Total		Discipline	
No.	Pos.	Name	Apps	Goals	Apps	Goals	Apps	Goals	Apps	Goals	Apps	Goals	Yellow card	Red card
1	GK	(England) Adam Legzdins	11	0	0	0	0	0	2	0	13	0	0	0
2	DF	(England) Elliott Omozusi	24 (1)	0	0	0	3	0	3	0	30 (1)	0	3	0
3	DF	(England) Gary Sawyer	12 (1)	0	0 (1)	0	2	0	2	0	16 (2)	0	2	0
4	DF	(France) Romain Vincelot	27	2	0	0	1 (2)	2	3	0	31 (2)	4	12	1
5	DF	(Scotland) Scott Cuthbert	36 (2)	2	1	0	1 (1)	0	3	0	41 (3)	2	4	0
6	DF	(France) Mathieu Baudry	28 (3)	1	1	0	3	1	2 (1)	0	34 (4)	2	11	1
7	MF	(England) Dean Cox	27 (10)	6	1	0	1 (2)	1	1 (2)	0	30 (14)	7	5	0
8	MF	(Wales) Lloyd James	10 (3)	1	0	0	3	0	1	0	14 (3)	1	4	0
9	FW	(Jamaica) Kevin Lisbie	5 (2)	2	0	0	0 (1)	0	0	0	5 (3)	2	0	0
10	FW	(Republic of Ireland) Dave Mooney	20 (13)	9	0	0	3	0	2	0	25 (13)	9	3	0
11	MF	(Jamaica) Jobi McAnuff	25 (9)	3	0	0	2	0	1 (1)	0	28 (10)	3	9	1
12	DF	(Australia) Shane Lowry	31 (3)	0	1	0	1	0	3 (1)	0	36 (4)	0	8	0
14	FW	(England) Shaun Batt	5 (11)	1	1	0	1	0	1 (2)	0	8 (13)	1	3	0
15	DF	(England) Nathan Clarke	31 (2)	0	1	0	2	0	3	0	37 (2)	0	9	0
16	MF	(England) Harry Lee	0 (2)	0	0	0	0	0	0 (2)	0	0 (4)	0	1	0
17	MF	(England) Josh Wright	26 (3)	2	1	0	0	0	2	0	29 (3)	2	6	0
18	MF	(Zimbabwe) Bradley Pritchard	22 (9)	0	1	0	1 (1)	0	4	1	28 (10)	1	2	0
19	MF	(England) Scott Kashket	0 (1)	0	0	0	0	0	0 (2)	0	0 (3)	0	0	0
20	MF	(England) Marvin Bartley	17 (5)	0	0 (1)	0	2	0	3	1	22 (6)	1	5	0
21	GK	(England) Charlie Grainger	0	0	0	0	0	0	0	0	0	0	0	0
22	DF	(Cyprus) Andis Nikolaou	0	0	0	0	0	0	0	0	0	0	0	0
23	FW	(England) Chris Dagnall	34 (4)	11	1	0	0 (1)	0	2	2	37 (5)	13	2	1
24	FW	(England) Darius Henderson	16 (7)	8	0	0	0 (1)	0	1	0	17 (8)	8	4	1
25	DF	(England) Sam Ling	0	0	0	0	0	0	0	0	0	0	0	0
26	DF	(England) Luke O'Neill	8	0	0	0	0	0	0	0	8	0	2	0
27	FW	(England) Jay Simpson	12 (16)	5	1	0	3	0	2	3	18 (16)	8	1	0
28	MF	(England) Montel Agyemang	0 (1)	0	0	0	0	0	0	0	0 (1)	0	0	0
29	FW	(England) Victor Adeboyejo	0 (1)	0	0	0	0	0	0	0	0 (1)	0	0	0
30	FW	(Italy) Gianvito Plasmati	7 (7)	2	0	0	0	0	1	0	8 (7)	2	1	0
31	GK	(England) Sam Sargeant	0	0	0	0	0	0	0	0	0	0	0	0
32	DF	(Italy) Andrea Dossena	13 (2)	1	0	0	0	0	0	0	13 (2)	1	1	0
33	GK	(England) Gary Woods	16 (1)	0	1	0	3	0	2	0	22 (1)	0	1	0
34	FW	(Wales) Ryan Hedges	11 (6)	2	0	0	0	0	0	0	11 (6)	2	3	0
35	MF	(Wales) Jake Taylor	3	0	0	0	0	0	0	0	3	0	0	0
40	GK	(Australia) Alex Cisak	19	0	0	0	0	0	0	0	19	0	0	0
Players who have appeared in Leyton Orient's squad this season but who have left the club:
–	DF	(England) Alex Finney	0	0	0	0	0	0	0	0	0	0	0	0
17	MF	(Canada) Michael Petrasso	2 (1)	0	0	0	1	0	0	0	3 (1)	0	0	0
26	MF	(England) John Lundstram	3 (1)	0	0	0	0	0	0	0	3 (1)	0	0	0
26	MF	(England) Jack Price	4 (1)	0	0	0	0	0	0	0	4 (1)	0	0	0
35	DF	(Wales) Neal Eardley	1	0	0	0	0	0	0	0	1	0	0	0

== Transfers ==
Players transferred in
Date	Pos.	Name	Club transferred from	Fee	Ref.
13 June 2014	GK	(England) Adam Legzdins	Derby County	Free	
10 July 2014	MF	(Zimbabwe) Bradley Pritchard	Charlton Athletic	Free	
17 July 2014	GK	(England) Gary Woods	Watford	Free	
21 July 2014	DF	(Australia) Shane Lowry	Millwall	Free	
25 July 2014	MF	(Jamaica) Jobi McAnuff	Reading	Free	
31 July 2014	FW	(England) Jay Simpson	(Thailand) Buriram United	Free	
1 August 2014	FW	(England) Darius Henderson	Nottingham Forest	Free	
20 October 2014	FW	(Italy) Gianvito Plasmati	(Italy) Siena	Free	
6 November 2014	DF	(Italy) Andrea Dossena	Sunderland	Free	
6 January 2015	MF	(England) Josh Wright	Millwall	Free	
Players transferred out
Date	Pos.	Name	Club transferred to	Fee	Ref.
30 May 2014	MF	(Northern Ireland) Johnny Gorman	Released (later joined Southport)	Free	
30 May 2014	GK	(England) Jake Larkins	Released (later joined Bishop's Stortford)	Free	
30 May 2014	MF	(France) Yohann Lasimant	Released (later joined Lokomotiv Plovdiv)	Free	
30 May 2014	FW	(England) Robbie Simpson	Released (later joined Cambridge United)	Free	
30 May 2014	DF	(England) De'Reece Vanderhyde	Released (later joined Hayes & Yeading United)	Free	
6 June 2014	GK	(England) Jamie Jones	Preston North End	Free	
27 June 2014	MF	(England) Moses Odubajo	Brentford	£1,000,000	
26 August 2014	DF	(England) Alex Finney	Bolton Wanderers	Undisclosed	
Players loaned in
Date	Pos.	Name	Club loaned from	Loan end date	Ref.
11 September 2014	MF	(Canada) Michael Petrasso	Queens Park Rangers	12 October 2014	
7 October 2014	MF	(England) Jack Price	Wolverhampton Wanderers	24 October 2014	
9 January 2015	MF	(England) John Lundstram	Everton	18 February 2015	
16 January 2015	FW	(Wales) Ryan Hedges	Swansea City	3 May 2015	
22 January 2015	DF	(Wales) Neal Eardley	Birmingham City	9 February 2015	
2 February 2015	GK	(Australia) Alex Cisak	Burnley	3 May 2015	
26 February 2015	DF	(England) Luke O'Neill	Burnley	28 March 2015	
26 March 2015	MF	(Wales) Jake Taylor	Reading	30 June 2015	
Players loaned out
Date	Pos.	Name	Club loaned to	Loan end date	Ref.
8 October 2014	MF	(England) Kane Adams	Royston Town	31 December 2014	
13 November 2014	GK	(England) Charlie Grainger	Farnborough	15 January 2015	
17 March 2015	FW	(Jamaica) Kevin Lisbie	Stevenage	16 April 2015	

== Results ==
=== Pre-season friendlies ===
18 July 2014	Dartford	2–3	Leyton Orient	Dartford
19:45	Noble 31'; Derry 76'	Report	James 11', 22'; Kashket 55' (pen.)	Stadium: Princes Park; Attendance: 705

23 July 2014	Gateshead	0–0	Leyton Orient	Gateshead
19:45		Report		Stadium: Gateshead International Stadium; Attendance: 619

26 July 2014	Northampton Town	0–1	Leyton Orient	Northampton
15:00		Report	Pritchard 62'	Stadium: Sixfields Stadium; Attendance: 1,054 (142)

29 July 2014	Leyton Orient	2–2	Queens Park Rangers	Leyton
19:45	Vincelot 10'; Cox 84'	Report	Hoilett 19'; Barton 47'	Stadium: Brisbane Road; Attendance: 2,996 (742); Referee: Darren Deadman

2 August 2014	Leyton Orient	1–1	Ipswich Town	Leyton
15:00	James 89' (pen.)	Report	Bajner 10'	Stadium: Brisbane Road; Attendance: 2,052 (595); Referee: G Sutton

=== League One ===
The fixtures for the 2014–15 season were announced on 18 June 2014 at 9am.

9 August 2014 1	Leyton Orient	1–2	Chesterfield	Leyton, London
15:00	Henderson 83'	Report	Boco 7'; Doyle 79'	Stadium: Brisbane Road; Attendance: 5,619; Referee: Michael Bull

16 August 2014 2	Oldham Athletic	1–3	Leyton Orient	Oldham
15:00	Forte 16'	Report	Henderson 20'; Mooney 58'; Lisbie 81'	Stadium: Boundary Park; Attendance: 3,754; Referee: Darren Bond

19 August 2014 3	Bristol City	0–0	Leyton Orient	Bristol
19:45		Report		Stadium: Ashton Gate; Attendance: 11,692; Referee: Simon Hooper

23 August 2014 4	Leyton Orient	0–0	Walsall	Leyton, London
15:00		Report		Stadium: Brisbane Road; Attendance: 4,400; Referee: David Webb

30 August 2014 5	Fleetwood Town	1–1	Leyton Orient	Fleetwood
15:00	Dobbie 83'	Report	Henderson 34'	Stadium: Highbury Stadium; Attendance: 3,222; Referee: Richard Clark

13 September 2014 6	Leyton Orient	0–2	Colchester United	Leyton, London
15:00		Report	Watt 62'; Sears 73'	Stadium: Brisbane Road; Attendance: 5,313; Referee: Keith Stroud

16 September 2014 7	Notts County	1–1	Leyton Orient	Nottingham
19:45	Ismail 25' (pen.)	Report	Dagnall 51' (pen.)	Stadium: Meadow Lane; Attendance: 4,024; Referee: Gary Sutton

20 September 2014 8	Scunthorpe United	1–2	Leyton Orient	Scunthorpe
15:00	Sparrow 49'	Report	Cuthbert 3'; McAnuff 51'	Stadium: Glanford Park; Attendance: 3,264; Referee: Eddie Ilderton

27 September 2014 9	Leyton Orient	2–3	Rochdale	Leyton, London
15:00	McAnuff 13'; Vincelot 42'	Report	Done 4', 66'; Vincenti 48'	Stadium: Brisbane Road; Attendance: 4,405; Referee: Darren Sheldrake

4 October 2014 10	Leyton Orient	1–2	Swindon Town	Leyton, London
15:00	Henderson 90+5'	Report	Smith 29'; Byrne 47'	Stadium: Brisbane Road; Attendance: 5,422; Referee: Tim Robinson

11 October 2014 11	Sheffield United	2–2	Leyton Orient	Sheffield
15:00	McCarthy 90'; McNulty 90+1'	Report	Simpson 38'; Vincelot 90+9'	Stadium: Bramall Lane; Attendance: 19,179; Referee: Andy Haines

18 October 2014 12	Leyton Orient	0–0	Milton Keynes Dons	Leyton, London
15:00		Report		Stadium: Brisbane Road; Attendance: 5,014; Referee: Graham Horwood

21 October 2014 13	Doncaster Rovers	0–2	Leyton Orient	Doncaster
19:45		Report	Simpson 2'; Henderson 62'	Stadium: Keepmoat Stadium; Attendance: 5,205; Referee: Chris Sarginson

25 October 2014 14	Port Vale	3–0	Leyton Orient	Burslem
15:00	Yates 63'; Williamson 66'; Clarke 81' (o.g.)	Report		Stadium: Vale Park; Attendance: 4,773; Referee: Lee Collins

28 October 2014 15	Leyton Orient	0–2	Preston North End	Leyton, London
19:45		Report	Robinson 19'; Huntington 75'	Stadium: Brisbane Road; Attendance: 4,560; Referee: Carl Berry

1 November 2014 16	Leyton Orient	2–2	Coventry City	Leyton, London
15:00	Cuthbert 54'; Simpson 70'	Report	O'Brien 35', 90'	Stadium: Brisbane Road; Attendance: 5,464; Referee: Jeremy Simpson

15 November 2014 17	Gillingham	3–2	Leyton Orient	Gillingham
15:00	Legge 55', 74'; McDonald 90+7'	Report	Plasmati 48' (pen.); Dagnall 90+3'	Stadium: Priestfield Stadium; Attendance: 5,891; Referee: Darren Deadman

22 November 2014 18	Leyton Orient	4–1	Crewe Alexandra	Leyton, London
15:00	Plasmati 23'; Dagnall 35'; Cox 61'; Mooney 86'	Report	Grant 70'	Stadium: Brisbane Road; Attendance: 5,516; Referee: Steve Martin

29 November 2014 19	Bradford City	3–1	Leyton Orient	Bradford
15:00	Knott 42'; Clarke 79'; Stead 81'	Report	Mooney 74'	Stadium: Valley Parade; Attendance: 12,489; Referee: Darren Handley

13 December 2014 20	Leyton Orient	1–2	Peterborough United	Leyton, London
15:00	Batt 39'	Report	McLean 9'; Oztumer 47'	Stadium: Brisbane Road; Attendance: 5,546; Referee: Kevin Johnson

20 December 2014 21	Barnsley	2–0	Leyton Orient	Barnsley
15:00	Hourihane 13'; Cole 38'	Report		Stadium: Oakwell; Attendance: 8,742; Referee: Mark Brown

26 December 2014 22	Leyton Orient	4–1	Crawley Town	Leyton, London
15:00	Cox 6'; Dagnall 19', 90+5'; Mooney 88'	Report	Smith 10'	Stadium: Brisbane Road; Attendance: 4,108; Referee: Phil Gibbs

29 December 2014 23	Yeovil Town	0–3	Leyton Orient	Yeovil
19:45		Report	Dagnall 34'; Lisbie 62'; Cox 85'	Stadium: Huish Park; Attendance: 4,132; Referee: Brendan Malone

10 January 2015 24	Leyton Orient	0–1	Fleetwood Town	Leyton, London
15:00		Report	Evans 46'	Stadium: Brisbane Road; Attendance: 4,947; Referee: Fred Graham

16 January 2015 25	Preston North End	2–2	Leyton Orient	Preston
19:45	Jermaine Beckford 22'; Paul Gallagher 68' (pen.)	Report	Dave Mooney 5'; Chris Dagnall 78'	Stadium: Deepdale; Attendance: 8,555; Referee: Scott Duncan

24 January 2015 26	Colchester United	2–0	Leyton Orient	Colchester
15:00	Gavin Massey 14'; Kaspars Gorkšs 47'	Report		Stadium: Colchester Community Stadium; Attendance: 5,668; Referee: Mark Heywood

31 January 2015 27	Leyton Orient	1–4	Scunthorpe United	Leyton, London
15:00	Darius Henderson 68' (pen.)	Report	Liam O'Neil 13'; Gary McSheffrey 28'; Tom Hopper 49', 80'	Stadium: Brisbane Road; Attendance: 5,184; Referee: Iain Williamson

10 February 2015 28	Leyton Orient	0–1	Notts County	Leyton, London
19:45		Report	Bálint Bajner 20'	Stadium: Brisbane Road; Attendance: 3,534; Referee: James Linington

14 February 2015 29	Chesterfield	2–3	Leyton Orient	Chesterfield
15:00	Jay O'Shea 19' (pen.); Elliott Omozusi 54' (o.g.)	Report	Dave Mooney 35', 70'; Dean Cox 90+11'	Stadium: Proact Stadium; Attendance: 6,524; Referee: Tim Robinson

18 February 2015 30	Leyton Orient	0–2	Bradford City	Leyton, London
19:45		Report	James Hanson 21', 32'	Stadium: Brisbane Road; Attendance: 4,760; Referee: Trevor Kettle

21 February 2015 31	Leyton Orient	3–0	Oldham Athletic	Leyton, London
15:00	Andrea Dossena 3'; Dave Mooney 25' (pen.); Jay Simpson 90+5'	Report		Stadium: Brisbane Road; Attendance: 4,423; Referee: Darren Sheldrake

28 February 2015 32	Walsall	0–2	Leyton Orient	Walsall
15:00		Report	Ryan Hedges 56'; Chris Dagnall 59'	Stadium: Bescot Stadium; Attendance: 5,239; Referee: Eddie Ilderton

3 March 2015 33	Leyton Orient	1–3	Bristol City	Leyton, London
19:45	Chris Dagnall 4'	Report	Luke Freeman 12'; Aden Flint 21'; Aaron Wilbraham 60'	Stadium: Brisbane Road; Attendance: 4,511; Referee: Iain Williamson

7 March 2015 34	Peterborough United	1–0	Leyton Orient	Peterborough
15:00	Jon Taylor 25'	Report		Stadium: London Road; Attendance: 6,525; Referee: Mark Brown

14 March 2015 35	Leyton Orient	3–0	Yeovil Town	Leyton, London
15:00	Chris Dagnall 2'; Ryan Hedges 7'; Jobi McAnuff 59'	Report		Stadium: Brisbane Road; Attendance: 5,117; Referee: Andy D'Urso

17 March 2015 36	Leyton Orient	0–0	Barnsley	Leyton, London
19:45		Report		Stadium: Brisbane Road; Attendance: 4,017; Referee: Gavin Ward

21 March 2015 37	Crawley Town	1–0	Leyton Orient	Crawley
15:00	Izale McLeod 33' (pen.)	Report		Stadium: Broadfield Stadium; Attendance: 3,255; Referee: Andy Davies

28 March 2015 38	Leyton Orient	3–1	Port Vale	Leyton, London
15:00	Dave Mooney 55' (pen.); Neill Collins 61' (o.g.); Dean Cox 84'	Report	Chris Birchall 28'	Stadium: Brisbane Road; Attendance: 5,623; Referee: Darren Handley

1 April 2015 39	Coventry City	0–1	Leyton Orient	Coventry
19:45		Report	Josh Wright 78'	Stadium: Ricoh Arena; Attendance: 8,010; Referee: Darren Bond

6 April 2015 40	Leyton Orient	3–3	Gillingham	Leyton, London
15:00	Lloyd James 31' (pen.); Darius Henderson 67'; Josh Wright 85'	Report	Jermaine McGlashan 35'; Cody McDonald 43', 56' (pen.)	Stadium: Brisbane Road; Attendance: 6,394; Referee: Mark Haywood

11 April 2015 41	Crewe Alexandra	1–1	Leyton Orient	Crewe
15:00	Lauri Dalla Valle 10'	Report	Darius Henderson 30'	Stadium: Gresty Road; Attendance: 4,419; Referee: Dean Whitestone

14 April 2015 42	Leyton Orient	0–1	Doncaster Rovers	Leyton, London
19:45		Report	Rob Jones 56'	Stadium: Brisbane Road; Attendance: 4,410; Referee: Carl Berry

18 April 2015 43	Milton Keynes Dons	6–1	Leyton Orient	Milton Keynes
15:00	Dean Bowditch 22'; Robert Hall 24', 37', 59'; Will Grigg 29' (pen.); Dele Alli 81'	Report	Jay Simpson 69'	Stadium: Stadium mk Attendance: 10,137; Referee: Chris Kavanagh

21 April 2015 44	Rochdale	1–0	Leyton Orient	Rochdale
19:45	Ian Henderson 66'	Report		Stadium: Spotland; Attendance: 1,914; Referee: Darren Drysdale

25 April 2015 45	Leyton Orient	1–1	Sheffield United	Leyton, London
15:00	Mathieu Baudry 71'	Report	Bob Harris 77'	Stadium: Brisbane Road; Attendance: 7,249; Referee: Seb Stockbridge

3 May 2015 46	Swindon Town	2–2	Leyton Orient	Swindon
12:15	Rodgers 61'; Williams 86' (pen.)	Report	Cox 40'; Dagnall 47'	Stadium: County Ground; Attendance: 8,609; Referee: Dean Whitestone

=== FA Cup ===
The draw for the first round of the FA Cup was made on 27 October 2014.

8 November 2014 1	Oldham Athletic	1–0	Leyton Orient	Oldham
15:00	Mike Jones 38'	Report		Stadium: Boundary Park; Attendance: 3,034; Referee: Seb Stockbridge

=== League Cup ===
12 August 2014 1	Plymouth Argyle	3–3 (a.e.t.) (5–6 p)	Leyton Orient	Plymouth
19:45	Reuben Reid 45', 64'; Carl McHugh 108'	report	Dean Cox 13'; Mathieu Baudry 38'; Romain Vincelot 103'	Stadium: Home Park; Attendance: Tony Harrington; Referee: 3,343
	Penalties
	River Allen (penalty scored); Lewis Alessandra (penalty scored); Tyler Harvey (penalty scored); Marvin Morgan (penalty scored); Jason Banton (penalty missed); Peter Hartley (penalty scored); Carl McHugh (penalty missed)		Dave Mooney (penalty scored); Kevin Lisbie (penalty scored); Gary Sawyer (penalty missed); Jobi McAnuff (penalty scored); Nathan Clarke (penalty scored); Romain Vincelot (penalty scored); Mathieu Baudry (penalty scored)

27 August 2014 2	Aston Villa	0–1	Leyton Orient	Birmingham
19:45		Report	Romain Vincelot 87'	Stadium: Villa Park; Attendance: 17,918; Referee: Carl Boyeson

23 September 2014 3	Leyton Orient	0–1	Sheffield United	Leyton
19:45		Report	Michael Higdon 2'	Stadium: Brisbane Road; Attendance: 3,223; Referee: James Adcock

=== Football League Trophy ===
2 September 2014 1	Peterborough United	2–3	Leyton Orient	Peterborough
19:45	Marcus Maddison 16'; Luke James 90+3'	Report	Chris Dagnall 4', 47'; Bradley Pritchard 62'	Stadium: London Road; Attendance: 3,149; Referee: Dean Whitestone

7 October 2014 2	Dagenham & Redbridge	0–2	Leyton Orient	Dagenham
19:30		Report	Jay Simpson 5', 69'	Stadium: Victoria Road; Attendance: 2,318; Referee: James Linington

11 November 2014 SQF	Leyton Orient	2–0	Northampton Town	Leyton
19:45	Jay Simpson 28'; Marvin Bartley 89'	Report		Stadium: Brisbane Road; Attendance: 1,966; Referee: Andy Davies

6 December 2014 SSF	Gillingham	1–0	Leyton Orient	Gillingham
15:00	John Egan 79'	Report		Stadium: Priestfield Stadium; Attendance: 3,103; Referee: Trevor Kettle

== League One table ==
Pos	Team	Pld	W	D	L	GF	GA	GD	Pts	Promotion, qualification or relegation
20	Crewe Alexandra	46	14	10	22	43	75	−32	52	
21	Notts County (R)	46	12	14	20	45	63	−18	50	Relegation to Football League Two
22	Crawley Town (R)	46	13	11	22	53	79	−26	50	Relegation to Football League Two
23	Leyton Orient (R)	46	12	13	21	59	69	−10	49	Relegation to Football League Two
24	Yeovil Town (R)	46	10	10	26	36	75	−39	40	Relegation to Football League Two

Updated to match(es) played on 3 May 2015. Source: BBC Sport
Rules for classification: 1) Points; 2) Goal difference; 3) Number of goals scored
(R) Relegated
