= 2014 Buriram United F.C. season =

Buriram United
2014 season
- Chairman: Newin Chidchob
- Manager: Alexandre Gama
- Stadium: I-Mobile Stadium
- Thai Premier League: 1st
- Thai FA Cup: Fourth Round
- Thai League Cup: Runners-up
- Kor Royal Cup: Winners
- AFC Champions League: Group Stage
- Top goalscorer: Javier Patiño (21)
Home colours	Away colours	Third colours

The 2012 season was Buriram's 10th consecutive season in Thailand's top division. Buriram United will be competing in the 2014 AFC Champions League.

== Kor Royal Cup ==
As 2013 Thai Premier League and 2013 Thai FA Cup champions, Buriram played against 2013 Thai Premier League runners-up Muangthong United. The 79th Kor Royal Cup was held at 1 February. The match was normally played at the Supachalasai Stadium in Bangkok, but due to the 2013–14 Thai political crisis the match was moved to Suphanburi Stadium, Suphanburi.

Date	Opponents	H / A	Result F–A	Scorers
1 February 2014	SCG Muangthong United	N	1–0	Simpson 79'

== Toyota Premier Cup ==
Buriram will be playing against Nagoya Grampus in the 2014 Toyota Premier Cup. Buriram won the 2014 Toyota Premier Cup 5-4 from a penalty shootout.

Date	Opponents	H / A	Result F–A	Scorers
15 February 2014	(Japan) Nagoya Grampus	N	1–1 (a.e.t.) (5–4p)	Simpson 15'

== Thai FA Cup ==
Date	Opponents	H / A	Result F–A	Scorers	Round
21 May 2014	Chainat Hornbill	H	2–1	Rochela 28', Carmelo 43'	Round of 32
9 July 2014	Bangkok Glass	H	2–2 (a.e.t.) (3–5p)	Theerathon 22', Maranhão 89'	Round of 16

== Thai League Cup ==
Date	Opponents	H / A	Result F–A	Scorers	Round
2 March 2014	Mahasarakham United	A	3–0	Patiño (2) 68', 82', Carmelo 73'	Round of 64
30 April 2014	Ang Thong	A	1–1 (a.e.t.) (6–5p)	Carmelo 55'	Round of 32
11 June 2014	TTM Customs	A	3–1	Adisak 6', Tanasak 48', Anawin 58'	Round of 16
18 June 2014	SCG Muangthong United	H	0–0		Quarter-finals 1st leg
2 July 2014	SCG Muangthong United	A	1–0	Carmelo 88'	Quarter-finals 2nd leg
16 July 2014	Ratchaburi Mitrphol	H	1–0	Túñez 19'	Semi-finals 1st leg
30 July 2014	Ratchaburi Mitrphol	A	2–1	Túñez 45', Carmelo 73'	Semi-finals 2nd leg
12 October 2014	BEC Tero Sasana	N	0–2		Final

== Thai Premier League ==
Pos	Team	Pld	W	D	L	GF	GA	GD	Pts	Qualification or relegation
1	Buriram United (C)	38	23	10	5	69	26	+43	79	2015 AFC Champions League group stage
2	Chonburi	38	21	13	4	62	33	+29	76	2015 AFC Champions League Qualifying play-off (Note: Bangkok Glass, the winners of the 2014 Thai FA Cup also qualify for the play-off of the 2015 AFC Champions League.)
3	BEC Tero Sasana	38	18	14	6	66	41	+25	68	
4	Ratchaburi	38	17	14	7	62	42	+20	65	
5	Muangthong United	38	20	11	7	66	36	+30	62 (Note: Muangthong United and Singhtarua a nine-point deduction following a fight between their fans.)	

Updated to match(es) played on 2 November 2014. Source: Thai Premier League
Rules for classification: 1) points; 2) head-to-head points; 3) head-to-head goal difference; 4) goal difference; 5) number of goals scored
(C) Champions
Notes:

Date	Opponents	H / A	Result F–A	Scorers	League position
22 February 2014	Songkhla United	H	3–0	Patiño (2) 7', 81', Altobelli 76'	2nd
8 March 2014	Ratchaburi Mitrphol	H	0–0		4th
15 March 2014	BEC Tero Sasana	A	2–3	Simpson 14', Altobelli 52'	8th
23 March 2014	Bangkok Glass	A	0–3		14th
26 March 2014	PTT Rayong	H	2–0	Hirano 27', Carmelo 81'	9th
29 March 2014	Chiangrai United	A	1–1	Anawin 90'	11th
6 April 2014	GSE Samut Songkhram	H	1–1	Suchao 57'	10th
9 April 2014	Suphanburi	A	1–1	Patiño 37'	12th
19 April 2014	Singhtarua	A	0–1		13th
27 April 2014	Chonburi	H	2–0	Hirano (2) 46', 57'	12th
4 May 2014	Air Force Central	A	2–0	Tanasak 19', Patiño 70'	10th
10 May 2014	SCG Muangthong United	H	0–0		11th
18 May 2014	Army United	A	2–2	Patiño (2) 48', 72'	11th
28 May 2014	Osotspa M-150 Saraburi	A	2–0	Hirano 35', Patiño 58'	8th
31 May 2014	Bangkok United	H	3–0	Theerathon 33', Anawin 56', Jakkraphan 90'	7th
4 June 2014	Sisaket	H	2–0	Carmelo 18', Patiño 45'	6th
7 June 2014	Chainat Hornbill	A	3–0	Carmelo (2) 30', 49', Patiño 90'	4th
15 June 2014	TOT	H	3–0	Patiño 12', Carmelo 27', Suchao 67'	3rd
21 June 2014	Police United	A	2–0	Carmelo 27', Patiño 48'	3rd
25 June 2014	Songkhla United	A	3–2	Carmelo 33', Nattawut 39', Patiño 76'	3rd
29 June 2014	Ratchaburi Mitrphol	A	2–0	Jakkraphan 15', Patiño 45'	3rd
5 July 2014	BEC Tero Sasana	H	1–1	Jakkraphan 22'	3rd
12 July 2014	Bangkok Glass	H	3–1	Maranhão (2) 52', 56', Chitipat 62'	2nd
19 July 2014	PTT Rayong	A	1–1	Theerathon 14'	2nd
23 July 2014	Chiangrai United	H	5–0	Túñez 8', Carmelo 9', Suchao 61', Nattawut 78', Nitipong 88'	1st
27 July 2014	GSE Samut Songkhram	A	1–0	Carmelo 62'	1st
2 August 2014	Suphanburi	H	4–0	Suchao 55', Patiño (3) 60', 70', 85'	1st
10 August 2014	Singhtarua	H	2–0	Chitipat 3', Rochela 56'	1st
13 August 2014	Chonburi	A	0–1		1st
16 August 2014	Air Force Central	H	2–0	Patiño 40', Adisak 52'	1st
20 August 2014	SCG Muangthong United	A	1–0	Túñez 35'	1st
24 August 2014	Army United	H	1–1	Patiño 15'	1st
15 October 2014	Sisaket	A	3–1	Carmelo 5', Patiño (2) 31', 33'	1st
19 October 2014	Osotspa M-150 Saraburi	H	2–2	Rochela (2) 43', 86'	1st
22 October 2014	Bangkok United	A	0–2		2nd
26 October 2014	Chainat Hornbill	H	3–1	Carmelo 18', Panuwat (OG) 20', Anawin 73'	2nd
29 October 2014	TOT	A	2–0	Patiño 9', Carmelo 74'	1st
2 November 2014	Police United	H	2–1	Carmelo 9', Rochela 66'	1st

== Players ==
=== First team squad ===
Note: Flags indicate national team as defined under FIFA eligibility rules; some limited exceptions apply. Players may hold more than one non-FIFA nationality.

No.	Pos.	Nation	Player
1	GK	THA	Sivaruck Tedsungnoen (third captain)
2	DF	THA	Theeraton Bunmathan (vice captain)
3	DF	THA	Pratum Chuthong
4	MF	THA	Charyl Chappuis
5	DF	ESP	David Rochela
6	DF	THA	Tanasak Srisai
7	FW	ESP	Carmelo González
8	MF	THA	Suchao Nutnum (captain)
9	FW	THA	Adisak Kraisorn
10	MF	THA	Jakkraphan Kaewprom
13	MF	THA	Jirawat Makarom
14	DF	THA	Chitipat Tanklang

No.	Pos.	Nation	Player
15	MF	THA	Surat Sukha
16	MF	THA	August Gustafsson Lohaprasert
17	MF	THA	Anawin Jujeen
18	FW	ARG	Leonel Altobelli
19	FW	JPN	Kai Hirano
20	FW	PHI	Javier Patiño
21	MF	ARG	Leandro Torres
23	FW	ENG	Jay Simpson
25	DF	THA	Suree Sukha
26	GK	THA	Yotsapon Teangdar
32	FW	THA	Kittiphong Pluemjai
40	DF	ESP	Manuel Redondo

Note 1: The club lists the supporters as the 12th man.

=== Out on loan ===
Note: Flags indicate national team as defined under FIFA eligibility rules; some limited exceptions apply. Players may hold more than one non-FIFA nationality.

No.	Pos.	Nation	Player
—	MF	THA	Attapong Nooprom (at (Thailand) Ratchaburi)
—	FW	THA	Dennis Buschening (at (Thailand) Army United)

== Transfers ==
=== In ===
Date	Pos.	Name	From
2014	DF	(Spain) David Rochela	(Spain) Deportivo La Coruña
2014	FW	(England) Jay Simpson	(England) Hull City
2014	FW	(Thailand) Kittiphong Pluemjai	(Norway) Nest-Sotra
2014	MF	(Argentina) Leandro Torres	(Chile) Santiago Wanderers
2014	FW	(Argentina) Leonel Altobelli	(Argentina) Tigre
2014	FW	(Thailand) August Gustafsson Lohaprasert	(Sweden) GAIS

=== Out ===
Date	Pos.	Name	To
2014	FW	(Thailand) Suriya Domtaisong	(Thailand) Surin
2014	DF	(Thailand) Adit Phataraprasit	(Thailand) Bangkok United
2014	DF	(Spain) Osmar Barba	(South Korea) FC Seoul
2014	MF	(Thailand) Ekkachai Sumrei	(Thailand) Bangkok United
2014	MF	(Spain) Juan Quero	(Bolivia) Oriente Petrolero
2014	FW	(France) Goran Jerković	(Thailand) Army United
2014	DF	(Thailand) Ernesto Amantegui Phumipha	(Thailand) Army United
2014	FW	(Japan) Masahito Noto	(Thailand) Army United
2014	MF	(Spain) Bruno Herrero	(Spain) Girona
2014	FW	(Spain) Jesús Berrocal	(Spain) Ponferradina
