= Terrell Agyemang =

English footballer (born 2002)

Personal information
- Full name: Terrell Nana Obeng Agyemang
- Date of birth: 13 November 2002 (age 23)
- Place of birth: Lambeth, England
- Height: 1.83 m (6 ft 0 in)
- Position: Midfielder

Team information
- Current team: Boston United

Youth career
- –2022: Charlton Athletic
- 2022–2023: Manchester City

Senior career*
Years	Team	Apps	(Gls)
2023–2025	Middlesbrough	0	(0)
2023	→ Hartlepool United (loan)	4	(0)
2024	→ Hartlepool United (loan)	10	(0)
2024–2025	→ Airdrieonians (loan)	12	(0)
2025–2026	Morecambe	3	(0)
2025–2026	→ Wealdstone (loan)	27	(0)
2026–	Boston United	0	(0)
- * Club domestic league appearances and goals as of 26 June 2026 (UTC)

Terrell Nana Obeng Agyemang (born 13 November 2002) is an English professional footballer who plays as a midfielder for National League club Boston United.

== Career ==
Agyemang was in the youth academy of Charlton Athletic until 2022. He joined Manchester City for the 2022–2023 season and played for their under-21 team as they won the Premier League 2.

In June 2023, it was announced Agyemang would be joining Middlesbrough for the 2023–24 season. On 8 August 2023, he featured for the first time in a Middlesbrough match-day squad, being named as a substitute in the EFL Cup against Huddersfield Town.

On 13 October 2023, Terrell Agyemang joined Hartlepool United on a short-term loan deal, he returned to Middlesbrough 16 November after making five appearances. He rejoined Hartlepool on loan for the remainder of the season on 1 March 2024.

He joined Scottish side Airdrieonians on a season-long loan in June 2024. He scored his first senior goal for Airdrie on 20 July 2024 in the Scottish League Cup against Dumbarton, and went on to score twice in his first four games for the club. It was announced that he had returned to Middlesbrough on 2 January 2025. Agyemang's contract expired at Middlesbrough at the end of the 2024–25 season.

Agyemang signed for Morecambe on 27 August 2025. On 17 October 2025, he joined fellow National League side Wealdstone on an initial one-month loan. In December 2025, his loan with Wealdstone was extended until the end of the season. On 16 May 2026, Morecambe announced he was being released.

In June 2026, Agyemang joined National League club Boston United on a two-year deal.

== Personal life ==
Agyemang was born in London, England to Ghanaian parents. His brother Montel Agyemang is also a footballer whose clubs have included Billericay Town.

== Career statistics ==
As of 10 May 2026

Appearances and goals by club, season and competition
Club	Season	League			National cup (Note: Includes FA Cup and Scottish Cup)		League cup		Other		Total	
Club	Season	Division	Apps	Goals	Apps	Goals	Apps	Goals	Apps	Goals	Apps	Goals
Middlesbrough	2023–24	Championship	0	0	0	0	0	0	0	0	0	0
Middlesbrough	2024–25	Championship	0	0	0	0	0	0	0	0	0	0
Middlesbrough	Total		0	0	0	0	0	0	0	0	0	0
Hartlepool United (loan)	2023–24	National League	4	0	1	0	—		0	0	5	0
Hartlepool United (loan)	2023–24	National League	10	0	0	0	—		0	0	10	0
Airdrieonians (loan)	2024–25	Scottish Championship	12	0	1	0	5	2	1 (Note: Appearance in Scottish Challenge Cup)	0	19	2
Morecambe	2025–26	National League	3	0	0	0	—		0	0	3	0
Wealdstone (loan)	2025–26	National League	27	0	2	0	—		4 (Note: Includes National League Cup and FA Trophy)	0	33	0
Career total			56	0	4	0	5	2	5	0	70	2
