= Jay Simpson =

English footballer (born 1988)

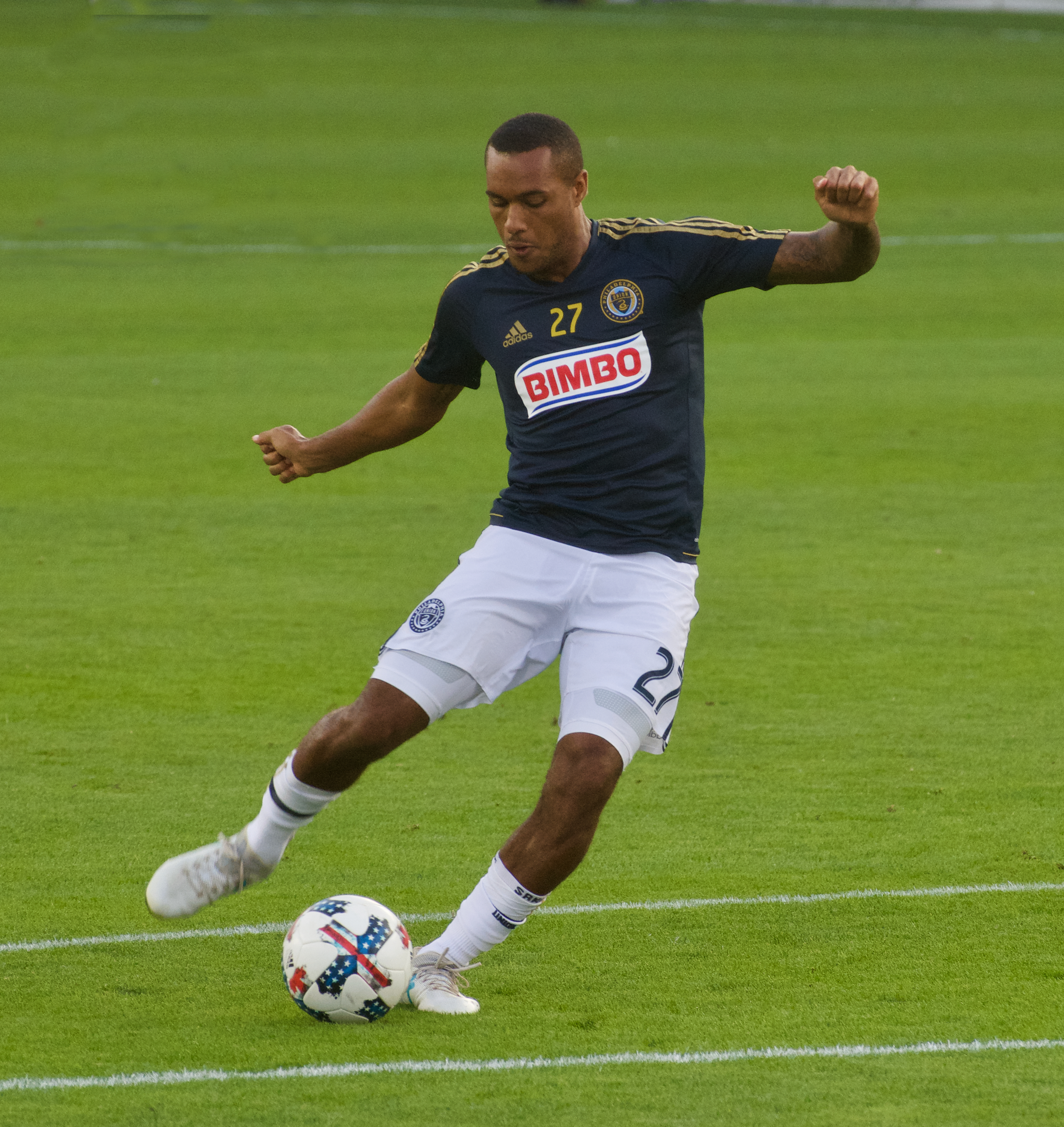
- Warming up for Philadelphia Union in 2017

Personal information
- Full name: Jay-Alistaire Frederick Simpson
- Date of birth: 1 December 1988 (age 37)
- Place of birth: Enfield, England
- Height: 5 ft 11 in (1.80 m)
- Position: Forward

Youth career
- 1996–1997: Norwich City
- 1997–2007: Arsenal

Senior career*
Years	Team	Apps	(Gls)
2007–2010	Arsenal	0	(0)
2007–2008	→ Millwall (loan)	41	(6)
2009	→ West Bromwich Albion (loan)	13	(1)
2009–2010	→ Queens Park Rangers (loan)	39	(12)
2010–2013	Hull City	78	(12)
2011–2012	→ Millwall (loan)	16	(4)
2013–2014	Buriram United	21	(1)
2014–2017	Leyton Orient	87	(33)
2017–2018	Philadelphia Union	30	(3)
2019	Leyton Orient	7	(1)
2019–2020	Nea Salamina	20	(2)
2022	Welling United	2	(0)
Total		354	(75)

International career
2004	England U17	4	(0)
- * Club domestic league appearances and goals

Jay-Alistaire Frederick Simpson (born 1 December 1988) is an English former professional footballer who played as a forward.

A product of the Arsenal Academy, he never played a league game for Arsenal, spending most of his time on loan, at Millwall, West Bromwich Albion and Queens Park Rangers. In 2010, he joined Hull City, and was released three years later. Simpson spent time in Thailand with Buriram United, winning the 2014 Kor Royal Cup before returning to England with Leyton Orient. He later played two years with Philadelphia Union of Major League Soccer, before returning to England and rejoining Orient.

== Club career ==
=== Arsenal ===
Born in Enfield, London, Simpson was with Norwich City before he joined Arsenal at the age of nine, and played in an under-18s game at just 13 years of age. He featured prominently for Arsenal's reserve team whilst at Islington Arts and Media School, and was on the bench for the first team's League Cup match against West Bromwich Albion on 24 October 2006, but did not play. On 19 February 2007, he made history by becoming the first player ever to score a hat-trick at the Emirates Stadium, for Arsenal's under-18 team in an FA Youth Cup match against Cardiff City, in a 3–2 win.

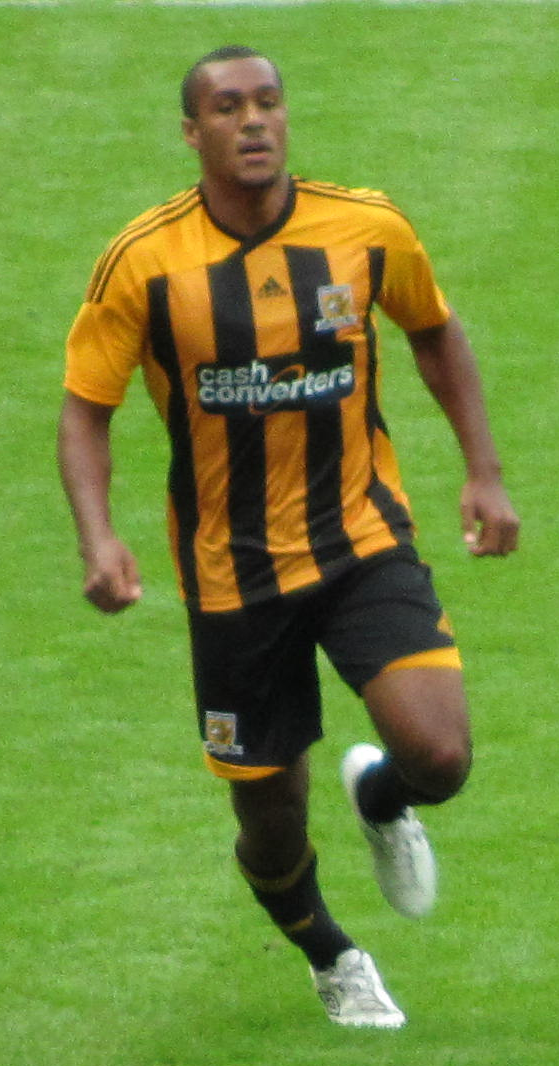
Simpson playing for Hull City in 2011

After his loan spell at Millwall came to an end, Arsenal manager Arsène Wenger stated that he believed Simpson had a future at Arsenal by stating "At the moment it is too early to say if he [Jay Simpson] has a future, but I think so yes. He has done extremely well and has scored goals. I always thought Jay was a very good player and the fact he can get good experience at Millwall makes us all happy, because he is not only a good player but a very nice boy." Simpson made his Arsenal first team debut in a 6–0 win over Sheffield United in the third round of the League Cup on 23 September 2008, coming on as a substitute for Nicklas Bendtner in the 71st minute. In the fourth round, he scored his first two senior Arsenal goals against Wigan Athletic in a 3–0 win on 11 November, in what was his first senior start for the club.

=== Loan spells ===
On 31 August 2007 he was loaned from Arsenal to Millwall until the new year. The next day, he made his first team debut in a 2–1 League One defeat to Huddersfield Town at The New Den, replacing Danny Spiller for the final eight minutes. He scored his first goal in a 3–2 loss to Swansea City in the first round of the Southern Section of the Football League Trophy on 4 September, and his first league goal in a 2–1 defeat to Swindon Town on 29 September. His performance saw him earned November's PFA Fans Player of Month award for League One. On 15 December, he was sent off for celebrating in the crowd after equalising in a 2–3 home loss to Oldham Athletic. His loan was due to expire on 1 January 2008, but was later extended to the end of the season. Simpson scored eight goals in 44 appearances for Millwall and won the PFA Fans' League One player of the year award for 2008. Simpson thanked Millwall for giving him the chance to improve his game, stating "Going to Millwall was the best decision I have ever made. Playing regularly in the first team really developed my game. It helped me grow as a player and I made a lot of good friends. It did me the world of good. The Millwall fans were really good to me – and I appreciated their support."

He signed a new contract with Arsenal on 29 December 2008, but was then loaned out to West Bromwich Albion for the remainder of the 2008–09 season. He made his Albion debut on 3 January 2009, coming on as a half-time substitute for Robert Koren in a 1–1 draw with Peterborough United at The Hawthorns in the FA Cup third round. He scored his first goal for the team ten days later, in a 2–0 win in the replay. His first Premier League goal was scored on 31 January, in the 2–2 draw against Hull City at the KC Stadium. After making seventeen appearances and scoring two times in all competitions, the club were relegated back to the Championship after one season in the Premier League. Following this, Simpson returned to his parent club.

On 27 August 2009, Simpson joined the Championship's Queens Park Rangers on a season-long loan. He made his debut in a 1–0 away win at Scunthorpe United. His third game for QPR was against Cardiff City, at the Cardiff City Stadium, and he went on to score a first-half brace, followed up by scoring in the next game on 26 September 2009, in a 5–2 win against Barnsley. In three straight wins against Preston North End, Reading and Derby County between 17 October 2009 and 24 October 2009, Simpson scored three goals in three separate matches. As the 2009–10 season progressed, Simpson scored six more goals and despite struggling his goalscoring form later on, he finished as the club's top scorer this season with thirteen goals in all competitions.

=== Hull City ===
On 19 August 2010, Simpson signed a three-year contract with Championship team Hull City for a fee of £1 million including add-ons. It came after when Simpson can leave Arsenal, prompting interests from clubs, such as, Queens Park Rangers, Fulham and Millwall.

He made his debut after starting in a 0–0 with Watford on 21 August. His first goals for the club came on 18 December, when he scored both goals of a home win against Bristol City, followed up by scoring another brace in the next game, with a 3–2 win over Sheffield United. His performance throughout December earned him a nomination for the npower Player of the Month award for December, but lost out to Danny Graham. After spending over a month as an unused substitute, he made his return coming on as a replacement for Tijani Belaid, and scoring his fifth goal of the season in the 1–1 away draw at Ipswich Town on 19 February 2011. On 23 April 2011, Simpson scored his sixth goal of the season, in a 4–2 loss against Middlesbrough. In his first season at the club, Simpson made thirty-four appearances and scoring six times in all competitions.

In the 2011–12 season, Simpson made three appearances at the start of the season, but struggled to get first team football at the club. As a result, Simpson signed again for Millwall on loan, on transfer deadline day, 31 August 2011, remaining with them until the new year. He made his Millwall debut for the second time on 11 September 2011, where he played 72 minutes before being substituted, in a 3–0 loss against Birmingham City. On 18 October 2011 he scored his first Millwall goal on his second loan spell, in a 1–1 draw against Brighton & Hove Albion. Two weeks later, on 29 October 2011, he scored twice, as well as, setting up two goals, in a 4–1 win over Ipswich Town. Simpson scored his fourth goal for the club on 20 November 2011, in a 2–1 loss against Bristol City. After making sixteen appearances and scoring four times in the first half of the season, Simpson returned to his parent club. However, Simpson spent the rest of the season out of the first team, as he remained on the sidelines.

In the 2012–13 season, new Manager Steve Bruce was impressed with Simpson's performance after scoring four goals in two friendly matches, including a hat-trick, with a 5–0 win over Winterton Rangers. With this performance, Bruce gave him a first team chance and did well when he scored the only goal in the game, with a win against Brighton & Hove Albion in the opening game of the season. He scored again in the second round of the League Cup, in a 3–2 loss against Doncaster Rovers, followed up by scoring three goals in five matches throughout September against Millwall, Leicester City and Peterborough United. After scoring against Wolverhampton Wanderers on 6 November 2012, Simpson played a vital two weeks later when he set up two goals, in a 3–2 win over Birmingham City. Despite suffering goal drought for the next four months, Simpson continued to remain in the first team. On 5 March 2013 he scored again, in a 4–2 loss against Crystal Palace. After helping the club reach the Premier League, Simpson went on to score seven goals in forty-seven appearances in all competitions.

At the end of the 2012–13 season, he was released despite keen on earning a new contract.

=== Buriram United ===
On 29 September 2013, he signed a two-year contract for Thailand's Buriram United which reportedly earned him £40,000 a month. On 1 February 2014 he scored his first goal in a Buriram United shirt during a 1–0 Kor Royal Cup win over Muangthong United in Suphanburi.

Simpson's contract with Buriram was terminated by mutual consent in the first half of the season. He later said that, despite the language issues, humidity, and separation from his family, he did not regret the move to Thailand.

=== Leyton Orient ===
On 31 July 2014, Simpson signed a three-year deal with League One club Leyton Orient. Upon joining the club, he cited his family as the main factor for his return to England. He was given number twenty-seven shirt ahead of the new season.

Simpson made his Leyton Orient debut, coming on as a second-half substitute, in a 2–1 loss against Chesterfield. On 7 October 2014 he scored his first goals in the second round of the Football League Trophy, in a 2–0 win over Dagenham & Redbridge. Four says later, on 11 October 2014, he scored his first league goal, in 2–2 draw against Sheffield United, followed up by scoring another two weeks later, in a 2–0 win over Doncaster Rovers. After scoring two goals throughout November, Simpson, however, was sidelined with injuries on two occasions that kept him out for the next three months. Simpson scored on his return from injury on 21 February 2015, in a 3–0 win over Oldham Athletic. Although he appeared out of first team around late-March and early-April, Simpson then returned to the first team and scored on 18 April 2015, in a 6–1 loss against Milton Keynes Dons. Although the club was relegated to League Two at the end of the season, Simpson finished his first season, making thirty-four appearances and scoring eight times in all competitions.

In the 2015–16 season, Simpson started the season well in League Two when he scored the opening game of the season, in a 2–0 win over Barnet. He then scored three goals in three consecutive matches throughout August against Stevenage, Newport County and Bristol Rovers. After scoring two times throughout September, Simpson, again, scored five goals in four matches, including a brace against Crawley Town on 10 October 2015. By the end of 2015, Simpson scored nine goals in ten matches against York City (twice), Plymouth Argyle, Wimbledon, Mansfield Town, Portsmouth, Bristol Rovers and Stevenage (twice). As a result of his performance, Simpson was named the League Two Player of the Month for November. After scoring two goals by the end of January, Simpson went on a goal drought throughout February and didn't score again in a 2–2 draw against Carlisle United and scored a brace in a 3–2 win over Dagenham & Redbridge on 16 April 2016. A week later, however, Simpson was sidelined for a week, due to back injury. Up until this point, Simpson remained an ever-present player since the start of the season. At the end of the 2015–16 season, Simpson went on to make forty-eight appearances and scoring twenty-five goals in all competitions, finishing as the second's top-scorer behind Matty Taylor. For his performance, Simpson was named the fifth best player in League Two and League Two PFA Team of the Year. In addition, Simpson was named Away Player of the Year award at the 20th annual Supporters' Club Dinner-Dance.

In the 2016–17 season, Simpson suffered a setback at the start of the season when he was sidelined with a sickness bug. While sidelined, Simpson was linked with a move away from the club, with Southend United keen on signing him, but the transfer move never happened. After returning to the first team, his return was short-lived when he suffered a back injury and was sidelined for weeks. After returning to the first team from injury, Simpson suffered a goal drought since the start of the season but on 12 November 2016 he scored a brace in a 3–0 win over Colchester United. He then scored again on 10 December 2016, in a 1–0 win over Accrington Stanley. By the first half of the season, Simpson went on to make seventeen appearances and score three times in all competitions.

=== Philadelphia Union ===
Simpson signed for Major League Soccer team Philadelphia Union on 9 January 2017. Reports suggested that Simpson's departure was due to him being unsettled at Orient. Upon joining Philadelphia, the club's sporting director Earnie Stewart, commented on his move, saying: "Jay brings goal scoring prowess to our team, in addition to a valuable veteran presence, as he has demonstrated with multiple clubs in England."

Simpson started the first match of the 2017 season, against Vancouver Whitecaps, and scored the Union's first goal of the season against 2016 Eastern Conference Champions, Toronto FC. He was restricted to substitute appearances for most of his tenure at the club, starting five of his 30 appearances. His final start came against Sporting Kansas City in September 2018. The match also saw him score his second and third goals for the club. Simpson was released by Philadelphia on 19 November 2018.

=== Return to Leyton Orient ===
On 12 February 2019, it was announced that Simpson would rejoin Leyton Orient. He started his first competitive match in almost five months in a National League fixture against Maidenhead United on 16 February.

=== Nea Salamina ===
On 30 June 2019, it was announced, that Simpson had joined Cypriot club Nea Salamina on a 1-year contract.

=== Welling United ===
In November 2022, Simpson returned to England when he joined National League South club Welling United.

On 2 December 2022, It was announced that Simpson had left the club.

However in March 2023, Welling United were deducted 1 point in the National League South due to the club not having international clearance for him.

== International career ==
Simpson was capped by England at youth level.

== Personal life ==
Simpson is of Jamaican descent. He and his wife, Isabelle, have three children.

== Career statistics ==
As of 4 February 2017

Appearances and goals by club, season and competition
Club	Season	League			Cup		League Cup		Continental		Other		Total	
Club	Season	Division	Apps	Goals	Apps	Goals	Apps	Goals	Apps	Goals	Apps	Goals	Apps	Goals
Arsenal	2007–08	Premier League	0	0	0	0	0	0	0	0	—		0	0
Arsenal	2008–09	Premier League	0	0	0	0	3	2	0	0	—		3	2
Arsenal	2009–10	Premier League	0	0	0	0	0	0	0	0	—		0	0
Arsenal	Total		0	0	0	0	3	2	0	0	—		3	2
Millwall (loan)	2007–08	League One	41	6	4	1	0	0	—		1 (Note: Appearance in Football League Trophy)	1	46	8
West Bromwich Albion (loan)	2008–09	Premier League	13	1	4	1	0	0	—		—		17	2
Queens Park Rangers (loan)	2009–10	Championship	39	12	2	1	1	0	—		—		42	13
Hull City	2010–11	Championship	32	6	1	0	1	0	—		—		34	6
Hull City	2011–12	Championship	3	0	1	0	1	0	—		—		5	0
Hull City	2012–13	Championship	43	6	3	0	1	1	—		—		47	7
Hull City	Total		78	12	5	0	3	1	—		—		86	13
Millwall (loan)	2011–12	Championship	16	4	0	0	0	0	—		—		16	4
Buriram United	2014	Thai Premier League	15	1	0	0	0	0	6	0	1	1	22	2
Leyton Orient	2014–15	League One	28	5	1	0	3	0	—		2	3	34	8
Leyton Orient	2015–16	League Two	45	25	2	0	1	0	—		0	0	48	25
Leyton Orient	2016–17	League Two	14	3	1	0	0	0	—		0	0	17	3
Leyton Orient	Total		87	33	4	0	4	0	—		2	3	99	36
Philadelphia Union	2017	Major League Soccer	22	1	0	0	2	0	—		0	0	24	1
Philadelphia Union	2018	Major League Soccer	2	0	0	0	1	1	—		0	0	3	1
Total			312	70	19	3	14	4	6	0	6	5	357	82

== Honours ==
Buriram United

- Kor Royal Cup: 2014

Individual

- PFA Fans' Player of the Month: November 2007 League One
- PFA Fans' Player of the Year: 2007–08 League One
- PFA Team of the Year: 2015–16 League Two
- Football League Two Player of the Month: November 2015
- Leyton Orient Away Player of the Year: 2016
