= Frazer Shaw =

English footballer

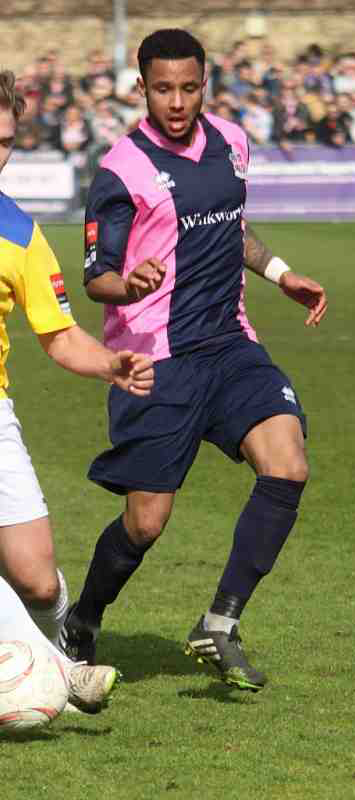
- Frazer Shaw playing for Dulwich Hamlet in 2015

Personal information
- Full name: Frazer Dean Shaw
- Date of birth: 23 December 1994 (age 31)
- Place of birth: Newham, England
- Height: 1.75 m (5 ft 9 in)
- Position: Defender

Team information
- Current team: Lewes

Youth career
- –2009: Arsenal
- 2009–2014: West Ham United

Senior career*
Years	Team	Apps	(Gls)
2014	Billericay Town	10	(0)
2014–2015	Dulwich Hamlet	34	(0)
2015–2016	Leyton Orient	25	(0)
2016	Accrington Stanley	0	(0)
2016	East Thurrock United	0	(0)
2016–2017	Woking	5	(0)
2017	Dulwich Hamlet	9	(0)
2017–2018	Eastleigh	6	(0)
2018	Leatherhead	11	(0)
2018–2019	Concord Rangers	29	(0)
2019–2020	Chelmsford City	32	(0)
2020–2021	Concord Rangers	9	(0)
2022	Kingstonian	4	(0)
2022	Potters Bar Town	36	(0)
2022–	Faversham Town	18	(0)
2023–	Lewes	0	(0)

International career^{‡}
2015	England C	1	(0)
- * Club domestic league appearances and goals as of 22:20, 18 April 2023 (UTC) ‡ National team caps and goals as of 15:18, 23 February 2018 (UTC)

Frazer Dean Shaw (born 23 December 1994) is an English professional footballer who plays as a defender for Lewes.

== Club career ==
Shaw began his career at West Ham United where he played at under-21 level under coach Ian Hendon, before leaving at the end of the 2013–14 season.

He signed forms with Billericay Town ahead of the 2014–15 Isthmian League Premier Division season, and although featuring regularly in the early part of the season, was released after just over a month at the club.

He was immediately signed by Isthmian League Premier Division rivals Dulwich Hamlet, making his debut for the club against Wingate & Finchley on 23 September 2014. He went on to play 38 times in all competitions, and he was rewarded with a call up to the England C team for their match against Republic of Ireland U21 on 1 June 2015, playing the full 90 minutes as England C won 2–1.

His season with Dulwich Hamlet did not go unnoticed, and he was reunited with Hendon at Leyton Orient shortly before the start of the 2015–16 season following a successful trial period. He left at the end of the season after 25 appearances in the league. He made his Football League debut for Orient in the 2–0 home win over Barnet on 8 August 2015, the opening day of the season.

On 8 November 2016, Shaw joined National League South side East Thurrock United. However, after only making one appearance in the Essex Senior Cup, Shaw joined National League side Woking ahead of their Surrey Senior Cup tie against Walton Casuals. On 19 November 2016, Shaw made his league debut for Woking in a 3–0 away victory over Maidstone United. On 23 May 2017, it was announced that Shaw would leave Woking upon the expiry of his current deal in June 2017.

On 18 August 2017, Shaw re-joined Dulwich Hamlet on a short-term deal. He was released on 1 November 2017, after making twelve appearances in all competitions during his second spell at the club.

On 10 November 2017, following his release from Dulwich Hamlet, Shaw returned to the National League to join Eastleigh. A day later, he went onto make his debut during Eastleigh's 2–0 away defeat against Dover Athletic, featuring for the full 90 minutes. On 22 February 2018, it was announced that Shaw's contract had been terminated after appearing six times in all competitions.

On 24 March 2018, Shaw returned to the Isthmian League, to join Leatherhead. Three days later, he made his debut during their 1–1 draw with Dorking Wanderers, featuring for 87 minutes before being replaced by Tom Richards. Shaw went onto appear ten more times for the Surrey-based side before leaving in May 2018.

On 3 May 2018, following the departure of player/manager Sammy Moore, Shaw followed suit and joined National League South side Concord Rangers along with the former AFC Wimbledon man.

On 21 May 2019, Shaw signed for Chelmsford City. On 29 April 2020, Shaw announced his departure from the club.

On 2 July 2020, Shaw returned to fellow National League South side, Concord Rangers on a one-year deal.

On 21 January 2022, Shaw signed for Isthmian League Premier Division side Kingstonian. He only spent a couple of weeks with the club before moving to divisional rivals Potters Bar Town on 3 February, with K's manager, Hayden Bird, stating that he would struggle to get game time in the following weeks.

On 8 December 2022, Shaw joined Faversham Town following his departure from Potters Bar Town.

== Career statistics ==
As of match played 15 April 2023

Appearances and goals by club, season and competition
Club	Season	League			FA Cup		EFL Cup		Other		Total	
Club	Season	Division	Apps	Goals	Apps	Goals	Apps	Goals	Apps	Goals	Apps	Goals
Billericay Town	2014–15	Isthmian League Premier Division	10	0	1	0	—		0	0	11	0
Dulwich Hamlet	2014–15	Isthmian League Premier Division	34	0	—		—		4 (Note: One appearance in Alan Turvey Trophy; two appearance in FA Trophy; one appearance in Isthmian League Premier Division play-offs)	0	38	0
Leyton Orient	2015–16	League Two	25	0	3	0	1	0	1 (Note: Appearance(s) in Football League Trophy)	0	30	0
East Thurrock United	2016–17	National League South	0	0	0	0	—		0	0	0	0
Woking	2016–17	National League	5	0	1	0	—		2 (Note: Appearance(s) in FA Trophy)	0	8	0
Dulwich Hamlet	2017–18	Isthmian League Premier Division	9	0	2	0	—		1 (Note: Appearance(s) in Alan Turvey Trophy)	0	12	0
Eastleigh	2017–18	National League	6	0	—		—		0	0	6	0
Leatherhead	2017–18	Isthmian League Premier Division	11	0	—		—		—		11	0
Concord Rangers	2018–19	National League South	29	0	3	1	—		1	0	33	1
Chelmsford City	2019–20	National League South	32	0	1	0	—		3	0	36	0
Concord Rangers	2020–21	National League South	9	0	0	0	—		1	0	10	0
Kingstonian	2021–22	Isthmian League Premier Division	4	0	—		—		—		4	0
Potters Bar Town	2021–22	Isthmian League Premier Division	19	0	—		—		—		19	0
Potters Bar Town	2022–23	Isthmian League Premier Division	17	0	3	0	—		1	0	21	0
Potters Bar Town	Total		36	0	3	0	—		1	0	40	0
Faversham Town	2022–23	Isthmian League South East Division	18	0	—		—		—		18	0
Career total			244	0	14	1	1	0	14	0	273	1
