= Harry Lee (footballer, born 1995) =

English footballer

Personal information
- Full name: Harry Bertie Lee
- Date of birth: 20 March 1995 (age 31)
- Place of birth: Hackney, England
- Height: 1.83 m (6 ft 0 in)
- Position: Midfielder

Team information
- Current team: Concord Rangers

Youth career
- 2011–2013: Leyton Orient

Senior career*
Years	Team	Apps	(Gls)
2012–2016	Leyton Orient	3	(0)
2013	→ Farnborough (loan)	6	(2)
2014	→ Farnborough (loan)	10	(0)
2015–2016	→ Welling United (loan)	22	(2)
2016	Welling United	8	(1)
2016–2017	Braintree Town	33	(3)
2017	Chelmsford City	0	(0)
2017–2018	Concord Rangers	19	(4)
2018–2019	East Thurrock United	32	(1)
Total		92	(15)
- * Club domestic league appearances and goals as of 15 December 2017

Harry Bertie Lee (born 20 March 1995) is an English former professional footballer who plays as a midfielder for Concord Rangers. Since 2019, he has appeared in the ITVBe reality series The Only Way Is Essex.

== Club career ==
Lee began his career in the youth team at Orient, making 29 appearances and scoring four goals in 2011–12. He was called up to the senior squad on 9 October 2012 and was subsequently involved in several matches as an unused substitute. He and team-mate De'Reece Vanderhyde signed one-year professional contracts on 24 April 2013.

On 27 April 2013, Lee came off the bench to make his professional debut for Orient in the final match of the 2012–13 season, a 1–1 draw at home to Oldham Athletic.

On 29 October 2013, Lee joined Conference South club Farnborough on a month's loan, and made his debut on the same day as a substitute in the 4–2 league defeat at home to Bath City. He scored two league goals during his time at Farnborough: one in the 2–2 draw at Maidenhead United on 5 November, and one in the 3–1 defeat at Chelmsford City.

Lee was recalled to Orient for their 2nd round FA Cup match at home to Walsall as the London club's squad was depleted through injury and illness, and he appeared as a late substitute in their 1–0 win. Despite making few appearances during the 2013–14 season, he was offered a new contract in May 2014. After very few further appearances in Orient's 2014–15 relegation season, he signed another one-year contract in July 2015.

In August 2015, having missed Orient's pre-season programme through injury, Lee signed on a month's loan with Football Conference club Welling United. He made his debut for Welling as a substitute in the 2–1 league defeat at Macclesfield Town on 15 August. On 17 September, his loan was extended until early 2016, although Orient retained a 24-hour recall option. On 2 November, Orient manager Ian Hendon exercised this option and recalled Lee to Orient. However, after one match for Orient as an unused substitute, he returned to Welling on 10 November for a new 28-day loan period. He was again recalled to Orient at the end of December.

Lee signed a permanent deal with Welling on 11 January 2016.

On 14 June 2017, Lee joined National League South side Chelmsford City.

== Career statistics ==
As of match played 9 December 2017

Appearances and goals by club, season and competition
Club	Season	League			FA Cup		League Cup		Other		Total	
Club	Season	Division	Apps	Goals	Apps	Goals	Apps	Goals	Apps	Goals	Apps	Goals
Leyton Orient	2012–13	League One	1	0	0	0	0	0	0	0	1	0
Leyton Orient	2013–14	League One	0	0	2	0	0	0	0	0	2	0
Leyton Orient	2014–15	League One	2	0	0	0	0	0	2 (Note: Appearances in Football League Trophy)	0	4	0
Leyton Orient	Total		3	0	2	0	0	0	2	0	7	0
Farnborough (loan)	2013–14	Conference South	16	2	0	0	—		2 (Note: Appearances in FA Trophy)	0	18	2
Welling United (loan)	2015–16	National League	22	0	1	0	—		1	0	24	0
Welling United	2015–16	National League	8	0	0	0	—		1	0	9	0
Welling United	Total		30	0	1	0	—		2	0	33	0
Braintree Town	2016–17	National League	33	0	2	0	—		2	0	37	0
Chelmsford City	2017–18	National League South	0	0	0	0	—		0	0	0	0
Concord Rangers	2017–18	National League South	19	1	2	0	—		0	0	21	1
Career total			101	3	7	0	0	0	8	0	116	3
