= Francesco Becchetti =

Italian businessman (born 1966)

Francesco Becchetti (born 8 August 1966) is an Italian businessman who was the owner of Leyton Orient.

== Career ==
In 2014, Becchetti became owner of English side Leyton Orient.
