= August Gustafsson Lohaprasert =

Thai footballer (born 1993)

August Gustafsson
Personal information
- Full name: August Gustafsson Lohaprasert
- Date of birth: 3 September 1993 (age 33)
- Place of birth: Gothenburg, Sweden
- Height: 1.82 m (6 ft 0 in)
- Position: Midfielder

Youth career
- 2006–2008: Azalea BK
- 2009–2012: GAIS

Senior career*
Years	Team	Apps	(Gls)
2012–2013	GAIS	44	(9)
2014	Buriram United	0	(0)
2014	→ Surin (loan)	12	(2)
2015	Army United	2	(0)
2016	Gunnilse IS	19	(1)
2017–2020	Qviding FIF	30	(0)
Total		107	(12)

International career
2015	Thailand U23	1	(0)
- * Club domestic league appearances and goals as of 01:46, 4 January 2018 (UTC)

August Gustafsson Lohaprasert (Thai: ออกัสต์ กุสตาฟส์สัน เลาหประเสริฐ, born 3 September 1993), sometimes spelled August Gustavsson Lohaprasret, is a former professional footballer who plays as a midfielder. Born in Sweden, he represented Thailand internationally.

== Personal life ==
August was born in Gothenburg. His father is Thai and his mother is Swedish.
