= Leonel Altobelli =

Argentine footballer (born 1986)

Personal information
- Full name: Víctor Leonel Altobelli
- Date of birth: July 20, 1986 (age 40)
- Place of birth: Roque Sáenz Peña, Argentina
- Height: 1.82 m (6 ft 0 in)
- Position: Forward

Youth career
- Tigre

Senior career*
Years	Team	Apps	(Gls)
2004–2013	Tigre	51	(3)
2005–2007	→ Sportivo Barracas (loan)	56	(16)
2009–2010	→ Albacete (loan)	26	(0)
2011–2012	→ Independiente Rivadavia (loan)	6	(0)
2012	→ Gimnasia La Plata (loan)	18	(2)
2012–2013	→ Almirante Brown(loan)	14	(1)
2014	Buriram United	5	(2)
2014–2015	Deportivo Morón	56	(11)
2016	Cobreloa	11	(3)
2016–2017	Atlanta	22	(3)
2017	Barracas	12	(1)
2018	Othellos Athienou	10	(8)
- * Club domestic league appearances and goals as of 4 April 2018

Víctor Leonel Altobelli (born 20 July 1986) is an Argentine footballer.

== Career ==
Altobelli made his debut on December 3, 2004, for Tigre. In August 2009, he was loaned to Albacete Balompié. However, after one season he returned to Tigre. In the second half of 2011, he was transferred to Independiente Rivadavia.
