= Elliot Omozusi =

English footballer

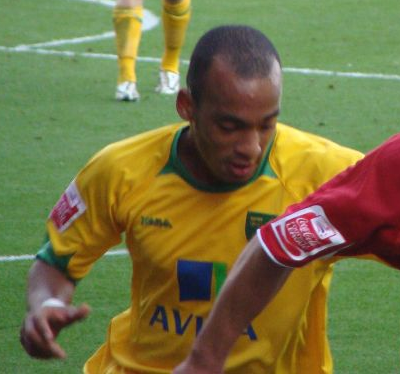
- Omozusi playing for Norwich City in 2008

Personal information
- Full name: Elliot Junior Uyi Omozusi
- Date of birth: 15 December 1988 (age 37)
- Place of birth: Hackney, England
- Position: Defender

Youth career
- –2006: Fulham

Senior career*
| Years | Team | Apps | (Gls) |
| 2006–2010 | Fulham | 8 | (0) |
| 2008–2009 | → Norwich City (loan) | 21 | (0) |
| 2009–2010 | → Charlton Athletic (loan) | 9 | (0) |
| 2010–2011 | Leyton Orient | 50 | (0) |
| 2013–2015 | Leyton Orient | 70 | (0) |
| 2015–2017 | Cambridge United | 14 | (0) |
| 2017 | Whitehawk | 10 | (0) |
| 2017–2021 | Chelmsford City | 96 | (1) |
| 2021–2022 | Barking | 7 | (0) |
| Total | | 285 | (1) |

International career
| 2003 | England U16 | 1 | (0) |
| 2004–2005 | England U17 | 11 | (0) |
| 2006 | England U18 | 1 | (0) |
| 2006–2007 | England U19 | 7 | (0) |
- * Club domestic league appearances and goals as of 15:48, 23 March 2021 (UTC)

Elliot Junior Uyi Omozusi (born 15 December 1988) is an English former footballer. Omozusi had two spells with Leyton Orient, playing over 100 games. He also played for Fulham, Norwich City and Charlton Athletic. Omozusi plays primarily at right back, but can also play in the centre of defence or in midfield.

== Career ==
=== Fulham ===
Born in Hackney, London, Omozusi attended the Homerton College of Technology. Omozusi made his first team debut for Fulham as a substitute in the League Cup second-round game against Wycombe Wanderers on 20 September 2006. The following month, Omozusi signed a three-year contract with Fulham. He was sent off in the game against Reading on 3 November 2007 after providing an assist for Fulham's second goal on only his second Premier League appearance for the club. On 3 December 2007 he started at right back against Manchester United at Old Trafford.

On 18 July 2008, Omozusi moved to Norwich City on a season long loan with Fulham having the option of recalling him in January 2009. Omozusi returned to Fulham from his loan spell at Norwich in January 2009. On 30 October 2009, Fulham announced a two-month loan deal with Charlton Athletic, which was subsequently extended until the end of January 2010. He eventually returned to Fulham in March after stopping training with Charlton.

=== Leyton Orient ===
In late April 2010, Omozusi was on trial at Leyton Orient and played in a reserve game against Millwall on 28 April. He subsequently signed for Orient on 2 June, where he stayed until a criminal conviction for witness intimidation saw him sentenced to prison in November 2011.

On 21 January 2013 Leyton Orient re-signed Omozusi following his release. He told the club's website: "I'm grateful to Leyton Orient for this opportunity given to me. I want to make the most of this second chance and I'm looking forward to helping the team over the rest of the season." He signed a new one-year contract on 2 May 2013.

On 30 January 2014, Omozusi was nominated for the PFA Player in the Community Award for his work with the Leyton Orient Community Sports Programme since his return to the club after his conviction.

=== Later career ===
Omozusi joined Cambridge United in June 2015, citing the club's involvement with community projects as a reason for signing. He was released by the club in January 2017 and subsequently joined Brighton-based National League South club Whitehawk until the end of the season in March 2017.

On 17 June 2017, Chelmsford City confirmed the signing of Omozusi. On 23 March 2021, Chelmsford announced Omozusi's departure from the club, alongside club captain Anthony Church.

== Personal life ==
On 17 November 2011, Omozusi was convicted of intimidating a witness in a murder trial and sentenced to two and a half years in prison.

== Career statistics ==
As of match played 6 February 2018

Appearances and goals by club, season and competition
| Club | Season | League | | | FA Cup | | League Cup | | Other | | Total | |
| Club | Season | Division | Apps | Goals | Apps | Goals | Apps | Goals | Apps | Goals | Apps | Goals |
|---|---|---|---|---|---|---|---|---|---|---|---|---|
| Fulham | 2006–07 | Premier League | 0 | 0 | 1 | 0 | 1 | 0 | — | | 2 | 0 |
| Fulham | 2007–08 | Premier League | 8 | 0 | 0 | 0 | 1 | 0 | — | | 9 | 0 |
| Fulham | Fulham total | | 8 | 0 | 1 | 0 | 2 | 0 | 0 | 0 | 11 | 0 |
| Norwich City (loan) | 2008–09 | Championship | 21 | 0 | 2 | 0 | 1 | 0 | — | | 24 | 0 |
| Charlton Athletic (loan) | 2009–10 | League One | 9 | 0 | 1 | 0 | 0 | 0 | 0 | 0 | 10 | 0 |
| Leyton Orient | 2010–11 | League One | 40 | 0 | 4 | 0 | 2 | 0 | 2 (Note: Appearances in the Football League Trophy) | 0 | 48 | 0 |
| Leyton Orient | 2011–12 | League One | 10 | 0 | 0 | 0 | 3 | 0 | 1 | 0 | 14 | 0 |
| Leyton Orient | 2012–13 | League One | 6 | 0 | 0 | 0 | 0 | 0 | 0 | 0 | 6 | 0 |
| Leyton Orient | 2013–14 | League One | 39 | 0 | 3 | 0 | 2 | 0 | 6 (Note: Three appearances in the Football League Trophy and three in the League One play-offs) | 0 | 50 | 0 |
| Leyton Orient | 2014–15 | League One | 25 | 0 | 0 | 0 | 3 | 0 | 3 | 0 | 31 | 0 |
| Leyton Orient | Leyton Orient total | | 120 | 0 | 7 | 0 | 10 | 0 | 12 | 0 | 149 | 0 |
| Cambridge United | 2015–16 | League Two | 14 | 0 | 1 | 0 | 1 | 0 | 0 | 0 | 16 | 0 |
| Whitehawk | 2016–17 | National League South | 10 | 0 | 0 | 0 | — | | 0 | 0 | 10 | 0 |
| Chelmsford City | 2017–18 | National League South | 23 | 1 | 3 | 0 | — | | 2 (Note: Two appearances in the Essex Senior Cup) | 0 | 28 | 1 |
| Career total | | | 205 | 1 | 15 | 0 | 14 | 0 | 14 | 0 | 248 | 1 |
