= Montel Agyemang =

English footballer

Personal information
- Full name: Montel Kofi Owusu Agyemang
- Date of birth: 22 November 1996 (age 29)
- Place of birth: Southwark, England
- Height: 1.75 m (5 ft 9 in)
- Position: Midfielder

Team information
- Current team: Cray Valley Paper Mills

Youth career
- –2014: Leyton Orient

Senior career*
Years	Team	Apps	(Gls)
2014–2016	Leyton Orient	1	(0)
2015	→ Royston Town (loan)	3	(0)
2015–2016	→ Grays Athletic (loan)	22	(0)
2016–2017	Fisher	2	(1)
2016–2017	Maldon & Tiptree	31	(3)
2017–2018	East Thurrock United	35	(5)
2018	Wealdstone	0	(0)
2018–2021	Welling United	30	(0)
2021–2022	Margate	41	(1)
2022–2023	Billericay Town	30	(1)
2023–2024	Margate	4	(0)
2024–2026	Horsham	28	(0)
2026	Brentwood Town	7	(0)
2026–	Cray Valley Paper Mills	14	(0)
- * Club domestic league appearances and goals as of 09:14, 19 April 2026 (UTC)

Montel Kofi Owusu Agyemang (born 22 November 1996) is an English professional football midfielder who plays for Isthmian League South East Division club Cray Valley Paper Mills.

== Career ==
Agyemang came through the ranks at Chelsea before moving to Leyton Orient after not being offered a scholarship. Agyemang was first named on Orient's first-team bench for the 2–0 win at Doncaster Rovers on 21 October 2014, and made his senior debut as a late substitute for Romain Vincelot in the 3–0 win at Yeovil Town on 29 December.

In February 2015, Agyemang went on a work experience loan to Southern League club Royston Town. He made his debut in Royston's 2–0 win at Aylesbury United on 21 February.

On 1 October 2015, Agyemang went to Isthmian League Premier Division club Grays Athletic on another work experience loan.

After a spell at Maldon & Tiptree during which he made 37 appearances in all competitions, scoring three goals, he joined East Thurrock United prior to the 2016–17 season.

On 18 May 2018, Agyemang signed for Wealdstone. He then went on to sign for Welling United in November 2018.

In June 2021, Agyemang joined Isthmian League Premier Division side Margate.

In June 2022, Agyemang joined Billericay Town following their relegation from National League South. After one season, he returned to Margate.

Having broken his leg at the beginning of the previous season, ruling him out for a period of twelve months, Agyemang returned to playing when he joined Horsham on 31 August 2024. He was part of the Horsham squad that won the Isthmian League Premier Division in 2024–25. On 8 May 2025, he was in the match day squad as Horsham won the Sussex Senior Cup. On 8 October, Agyemang dislocated his shoulder in a Sussex Senior Cup game vs. Whitehawk. This turned out to be his final game for the club. On 8 December, he moved on loan to Brentwood Town on a dual-registration basis.

In January 2026, Agyemang returned to the Isthmian League Premier Division following Horsham's promotion the previous season, joining Cray Valley Paper Mills.

== Personal life ==
His brother Terrell is also a footballer and currently plays for Morecambe.

== Career statistics ==
As of matches played 19 April 2026

Appearances and goals by club, season and competition
Club	Season	League			FA Cup		EFL Cup		Other		Total	
Club	Season	Division	Apps	Goals	Apps	Goals	Apps	Goals	Apps	Goals	Apps	Goals
Leyton Orient	2014–15	League One	1	0	0	0	—		0	0	1	0
Leyton Orient	2015–16	League One	0	0	0	0	—		0	0	0	0
Royston Town (loan)	2015-16	Southern Football League Division One Central	3	0	0	0	—		0	0	3	0
Grays Athletic (loan)	2015–16	Isthmian League Premier Division	22	0	2	0	—		3	0	27	0
Fisher	2016–17	Southern Counties East Premier Division	2	1	0	0	—		0	0	2	1
Maldon & Tiptree	2016–17	Isthmian League Division One North	31	3	0	0	—		0	0	31	3
East Thurrock United	2017–18	National League South	35	5	3	0	—		5	1	40	6
Wealdstone	2018–19	National League South	0	0	0	0	—		0	0	0	0
Welling United	2018–19	National League South	12	0	0	0	—		0	0	12	0
Welling United	2019–20	National League South	18	0	0	0	—		0	0	18	0
Welling United	2020–21	National League South	0	0	0	0	—		0	0	0	0
Welling United	Total		30	0	0	0	—		0	0	30	0
Margate	2021–22	Isthmian League Premier Division	41	1	2	1	—		8	0	49	2
Billericay Town	2022–23	Isthmian League Premier Division	30	1	2	0	—		4	0	36	1
Margate	2023–24	Isthmian League Premier Division	4	0	0	0	—		0	0	4	0
Horsham	2024–25	Isthmian League Premier Division	22	0	3	0	—		5	0	30	0
Horsham	2025–26	National League South	6	0	3	0	—		1	0	10	0
Horsham	Total		28	0	6	0	—		6	0	40	0
Brentwood Town (loan)	2025–26	Isthmian League Premier Division	7	0	0	0	—		0	0	7	0
Cray Valley Paper Mills	2025–26	Isthmian League Premier Division	14	0	0	0	—		0	0	14	0
Career total			248	11	15	1	0	0	26	1	289	13

== Honours ==
Horsham

- Isthmian League Premier Division: 2024–25
- Sussex Senior Cup: 2024–25
- Isthmian League Community Shield: 2025
