= 2015–16 Football League Two =

Football League Two
- Season: 2015–16
- Champions: Northampton Town (4th divisional title)
- Promoted: Northampton Town; Oxford United; Bristol Rovers; AFC Wimbledon
- Relegated: Dagenham & Redbridge; York City
- Matches: 552
- Goals: 1,472 (2.67 per match)
- Top goalscorer: Matty Taylor (27)
- Biggest home win: Cambridge United 7–0 Morecambe
- Biggest away win: Notts County 0–5 Carlisle United
- Highest scoring: Carlisle United 4–4 Cambridge United
- Longest winning run: Northampton Town (10 matches)
- Longest unbeaten run: Northampton Town (24 matches)
- Longest winless run: Yeovil Town (16 matches)
- Longest losing run: Crawley Town (8 matches)
- Highest attendance: Portsmouth 1–2 Northampton Town (18,746)
- Lowest attendance: Morecambe 1–0 Dagenham & Redbridge (1,026)
- All statistics correct as of 7 May 2016.

The 2015–16 Football League Two (referred to as the Sky Bet League Two for sponsorship reasons) was the 12th season of the Football League Two under its current title and the 24th season under its current league division format. The season began on 8 August 2015 and concluded on 7 May 2016.

Twenty-four clubs participated, eighteen of which played in League Two during the 2014–15 season. These teams were joined by Notts County, Crawley Town, Leyton Orient and Yeovil Town, who had been relegated from League One, and by Barnet and Bristol Rovers, who had been promoted from the Football Conference.

== Changes from last season ==
=== Teams ===
The following teams have changed division since the 2014–15 season.

==== To League Two ====
Promoted from Conference Premier

- Barnet
- Bristol Rovers

Relegated from Football League One

- Notts County
- Crawley Town
- Leyton Orient
- Yeovil Town

==== From League Two ====
Relegated to National League

- Cheltenham Town
- Tranmere Rovers

Promoted to Football League One

- Burton Albion
- Shrewsbury Town
- Bury
- Southend United

== Team overview ==
=== Stadia and locations ===
Locations of teams in the 2015–2016 Football League Two
Greater London League Two football clubs

Team	Location	Stadium	Capacity
Accrington Stanley	Accrington	Crown Ground	5,057
AFC Wimbledon	London (Norbiton)	Kingsmeadow	4,850
Barnet	London (Canons Park)	The Hive Stadium	5,233
Bristol Rovers	Bristol	Memorial Stadium	11,916
Cambridge United	Cambridge	Abbey Stadium	8,127
Carlisle United	Carlisle	Brunton Park	16,981
Crawley Town	Crawley	Broadfield Stadium	5,996
Dagenham & Redbridge	London (Dagenham)	Victoria Road	6,078
Exeter City	Exeter	St James Park	8,830
Hartlepool United	Hartlepool	Victoria Park	8,240
Leyton Orient	London (Leyton)	Brisbane Road	9,271
Luton Town	Luton	Kenilworth Road	10,356
Mansfield Town	Mansfield	Field Mill	8,200
Morecambe	Morecambe	Globe Arena	6,476
Newport County	Newport	Rodney Parade	7,850 (Note: Newport County's safety certificate at the time allowed a maximum attendance of 7,850 for football matches)
Northampton Town	Northampton	Sixfields Stadium	7,653
Notts County	Nottingham	Meadow Lane	20,211
Oxford United	Oxford	Kassam Stadium	12,500
Plymouth Argyle	Plymouth	Home Park	16,388
Portsmouth	Portsmouth	Fratton Park	20,662
Stevenage	Stevenage	Broadhall Way	6,722
Wycombe Wanderers	High Wycombe	Adams Park	10,284
Yeovil Town	Yeovil	Huish Park	9,565
York City	York	Bootham Crescent	8,256

=== Managerial changes ===
Team	Outgoing manager	Manner of departure	Date of vacancy	Position in table	Incoming manager	Date of appointment
Crawley Town	(England) John Gregory	Mutual consent	9 May 2015	Pre-season	(England) Mark Yates	19 May 2015
Leyton Orient	(Italy) Fabio Liverani	Mutual consent	13 May 2015	Pre-season	(England) Ian Hendon	28 May 2015
Plymouth Argyle	(Republic of Ireland) John Sheridan	Mutual consent	28 May 2015	Pre-season	(Scotland) Derek Adams	11 June 2015
Stevenage	(England) Graham Westley	End of contract	31 May 2015	Pre-season	(England) Teddy Sheringham	21 May 2015
Newport County	(England) Terry Butcher	Sacked	1 October 2015	24th	(Republic of Ireland) John Sheridan	2 October 2015
York City	(England) Russ Wilcox	Sacked	26 October 2015	21st	(Scotland) Jackie McNamara	4 November 2015
Cambridge United	(England) Richard Money	Sacked	2 November 2015	18th	(England) Shaun Derry	12 November 2015
Yeovil Town	(Scotland) Paul Sturrock	Sacked	1 December 2015	24th	(England) Darren Way	31 December 2015
Luton Town	(England) John Still	Sacked	17 December 2015	17th	(Wales) Nathan Jones	6 January 2016
Dagenham & Redbridge	(England) Wayne Burnett	Sacked	21 December 2015	24th	(England) John Still	31 December 2015
Notts County	(Netherlands) Ricardo Moniz	Sacked	29 December 2015	15th	(Scotland) Jamie Fullarton	10 January 2016
Newport County	(Republic of Ireland) John Sheridan	Signed by Oldham	13 January 2016	20th	(Northern Ireland) Warren Feeney	15 January 2016
Leyton Orient	(England) Ian Hendon	Sacked	18 January 2016	11th	(England) Kevin Nolan	21 January 2016
Stevenage	(England) Teddy Sheringham	Sacked	1 February 2016	19th	(England) Darren Sarll	1 February 2016
Hartlepool United	(England) Ronnie Moore	Sacked	10 February 2016	22nd	(England) Craig Hignett	11 February 2016
Notts County	(Scotland) Jamie Fullarton	Sacked	19 March 2016	19th	(England) Mark Cooper	20 March 2016
Leyton Orient	(England) Kevin Nolan	Demoted from position	12 April 2016	11th	(England) Andy Hessenthaler	12 April 2016
Crawley Town	(England) Mark Yates	Sacked	25 April 2016	18th	(England) Dermot Drummy	27 April 2016
Notts County	(England) Mark Cooper	End of contract	7 May 2016	17th	(Republic of Ireland) John Sheridan	27 May 2016

== League table ==
Pos	Team	Pld	W	D	L	GF	GA	GD	Pts	Promotion, qualification or relegation
1	Northampton Town (C, P)	46	29	12	5	82	46	+36	99	Promotion to EFL League One
2	Oxford United (P)	46	24	14	8	84	41	+43	86	Promotion to EFL League One
3	Bristol Rovers (P)	46	26	7	13	77	46	+31	85	Promotion to EFL League One
4	Accrington Stanley	46	24	13	9	74	48	+26	85	Qualification for League Two play-offs (Note: Four teams play for one spot and promotion to Football League One.)
5	Plymouth Argyle	46	24	9	13	72	46	+26	81	Qualification for League Two play-offs
6	Portsmouth	46	21	15	10	75	44	+31	78	Qualification for League Two play-offs
7	AFC Wimbledon (O, P)	46	21	12	13	64	50	+14	75	Qualification for League Two play-offs
8	Leyton Orient	46	19	12	15	60	61	−1	69	
9	Cambridge United	46	18	14	14	66	55	+11	68	
10	Carlisle United	46	17	16	13	67	62	+5	67	
11	Luton Town	46	19	9	18	63	61	+2	66	
12	Mansfield Town	46	17	13	16	61	53	+8	64	
13	Wycombe Wanderers	46	17	13	16	45	44	+1	64	
14	Exeter City	46	17	13	16	63	65	−2	64	
15	Barnet	46	17	11	18	67	68	−1	62	
16	Hartlepool United	46	15	6	25	49	72	−23	51	
17	Notts County	46	14	9	23	54	83	−29	51	
18	Stevenage	46	11	15	20	52	67	−15	48	
19	Yeovil Town	46	11	15	20	43	59	−16	48	
20	Crawley Town	46	13	8	25	45	78	−33	47	
21	Morecambe	46	12	10	24	69	91	−22	46	
22	Newport County	46	10	13	23	43	64	−21	43	
23	Dagenham & Redbridge (R)	46	8	10	28	46	81	−35	34	Relegation to the National League
24	York City (R)	46	7	13	26	51	87	−36	34	Relegation to the National League

Updated to match(es) played on 7 May 2016. Source: BBC Sport
Rules for classification: 1) Points; 2) Goal difference; 3) Number of goals scored
(C) Champions; (O) Play-off winners; (P) Promoted; (R) Relegated

== Play-offs ==
Semifinals
4	Accrington Stanley	0	2	2
7	AFC Wimbledon	1	2	3
5	Plymouth Argyle	2	1	3
6	Portsmouth	2	0	2

Final
7	AFC Wimbledon	2
5	Plymouth Argyle	0

== Results ==
Home \ Away	ACC	WIM	BAR	BRR	CAM	CRL	CRA	D&R	EXE	HAR	LEY	LUT	MAN	MOR	NPC	NOR	NTC	OXF	PLY	POR	STE	WYC	YEO	YOR
Accrington Stanley		3–4	2–2	1–0	1–1	1–1	4–1	3–1	4–2	3–1	1–0	1–1	1–0	2–2	2–2	1–1	3–2	1–3	2–1	1–3	0–0	1–1	2–1	3–0
AFC Wimbledon	0–0		2–0	0–0	1–2	1–0	1–0	0–1	2–1	2–0	1–0	4–1	3–1	2–5	1–0	1–1	2–1	1–2	0–2	0–1	1–2	1–1	2–3	2–1
Barnet	1–2	1–2		1–0	0–0	0–0	4–2	3–1	2–0	1–3	3–0	2–1	1–3	0–0	2–0	2–0	3–1	0–3	1–0	1–0	3–2	0–2	3–4	3–1
Bristol Rovers	0–1	3–1	3–1		3–0	2–0	3–0	2–1	3–1	4–1	2–1	2–0	1–0	2–1	1–4	0–1	0–0	0–1	1–1	1–2	1–2	3–0	2–1	2–1
Cambridge United	2–3	1–4	2–1	1–2		0–0	0–3	1–0	0–1	1–1	1–1	1–3	1–1	7–0	3–0	2–1	3–1	0–0	2–2	1–3	1–0	1–0	3–0	3–1
Carlisle United	2–0	1–1	3–2	3–2	4–4		3–1	2–1	1–0	1–0	2–2	1–2	1–2	2–3	0–1	1–4	3–0	0–2	0–2	2–2	1–0	1–1	3–2	1–1
Crawley Town	0–3	1–2	0–3	2–1	1–0	0–1		3–2	0–2	0–0	3–2	2–1	0–1	1–1	2–0	1–2	0–1	1–5	1–1	0–0	2–1	0–0	0–1	1–0
Dagenham & Redbridge	0–1	0–2	0–2	0–3	0–3	0–0	3–0		1–2	0–1	1–3	0–2	3–4	2–1	0–0	1–2	1–1	0–1	1–1	1–4	1–1	1–2	0–1	1–0
Exeter City	2–1	0–2	1–1	1–1	1–0	2–2	2–2	1–2		1–0	4–0	2–3	2–3	1–1	1–1	0–0	1–1	1–4	2–1	1–1	3–3	0–2	3–2	0–0
Hartlepool United	1–2	1–0	1–1	0–3	0–0	2–3	1–2	3–1	0–2		3–1	1–4	2–1	2–0	1–0	0–0	2–3	0–1	1–2	0–2	1–2	1–0	2–1	2–1
Leyton Orient	0–1	1–1	2–0	2–0	1–3	1–2	2–0	3–2	1–3	0–2		0–1	1–0	1–0	1–0	0–4	3–1	2–2	1–3	3–2	3–0	1–1	1–1	3–2
Luton Town	0–2	2–0	2–0	0–1	0–0	3–4	0–1	1–0	4–1	2–1	1–1		1–0	1–0	1–1	3–4	0–2	2–2	1–2	1–2	0–1	0–2	1–1	1–1
Mansfield Town	2–3	1–1	1–1	1–2	0–0	1–1	4–0	3–2	0–2	3–1	1–1	0–2		2–1	3–0	2–2	5–0	1–1	0–0	1–1	2–1	0–2	0–1	1–1
Morecambe	1–0	2–1	4–2	3–4	2–4	1–2	3–1	1–0	1–1	2–5	0–1	1–3	1–2		1–2	2–4	4–1	2–4	0–2	1–1	1–4	0–1	2–1	1–1
Newport County	0–2	2–2	0–3	1–4	0–1	1–0	0–3	2–2	1–1	0–0	2–3	3–0	1–0	1–2		2–2	0–1	1–1	1–2	0–1	2–2	1–0	0–0	0–3
Northampton Town	1–0	1–1	3–0	2–2	1–1	3–2	2–1	1–2	3–0	2–1	1–1	2–0	1–0	3–1	1–0		2–2	1–0	0–2	1–2	2–1	1–0	2–0	2–0
Notts County	1–1	0–2	4–2	0–2	1–2	0–5	4–1	0–0	1–4	1–0	0–1	3–2	0–2	2–2	4–3	1–2		2–4	0–2	2–1	1–0	0–0	2–0	1–0
Oxford United	1–2	1–0	2–3	1–2	1–0	1–1	1–1	4–0	3–0	2–0	0–1	2–3	2–2	0–0	1–1	0–1	3–1		1–0	1–1	1–1	3–0	2–0	4–0
Plymouth Argyle	1–0	1–2	2–1	1–1	1–2	4–1	2–1	2–3	1–2	5–0	1–1	0–1	3–0	2–0	1–0	1–2	1–0	2–2		1–2	3–2	0–1	1–0	3–2
Portsmouth	0–0	0–0	3–1	3–1	2–1	1–0	3–0	3–0	1–2	4–0	0–1	0–0	0–0	3–3	0–3	1–2	4–0	0–1	1–2		1–1	2–1	0–0	6–0
Stevenage	1–1	0–0	0–0	0–0	2–0	0–1	0–1	1–3	0–2	2–0	2–2	0–0	0–2	4–3	2–1	2–3	0–2	1–5	2–1	0–2		2–1	0–0	2–2
Wycombe Wanderers	0–1	1–2	1–1	1–0	1–0	1–1	2–0	1–1	1–0	2–1	0–2	0–1	1–0	0–2	0–2	2–3	2–2	2–1	1–2	2–2	1–0		0–0	3–0
Yeovil Town	1–0	1–1	2–2	0–1	2–3	0–0	2–1	2–2	0–2	1–2	0–1	3–2	0–1	2–4	1–0	1–1	1–0	0–0	0–0	1–1	2–2	0–1		1–0
York City	1–5	1–3	1–1	1–4	2–2	2–2	2–2	2–2	2–0	1–2	1–1	2–3	1–2	2–1	0–1	1–2	2–1	1–2	1–2	3–1	2–1	1–1	1–0	

Updated to match(es) played on 7 May 2016. Source: BBC Sport
Legend: Blue = home team win; Yellow = draw; Red = away team win.

== Top scorers ==
Source: BBC Sport
Correct as of 7 May 2016

Rank	Player	Club	Goals
1	(England) Matty Taylor	Bristol Rovers	27
2	(England) Jay Simpson	Leyton Orient	25
3	(England) John Akinde	Barnet	23
4	(Montserrat) Lyle Taylor	AFC Wimbledon	20
5	(Jamaica) Kemar Roofe	Oxford United	18
6	(Northern Ireland) Billy Kee	Accrington Stanley	17
7	(England) Matt Green	Mansfield Town	16
8	(England) Jabo Ibehre	Carlisle United	15
8	(England) Shaun Miller	Morecambe	15
8	(England) Marc Richards	Northampton Town	15
8	(England) Josh Windass	Accrington Stanley	15

== Monthly Awards ==
Month	Manager of the Month		Player of the Month		Reference
Month	Manager	Club	Player	Club	Reference
August	(England) Ian Hendon	Leyton Orient	(England) Dean Cox	Leyton Orient	
September	(England) John Coleman	Accrington Stanley	(England) Michael Gash	Barnet	
October	(Scotland) Derek Adams	Plymouth Argyle	(England) Shaun Miller	Morecambe	
November	(England) Chris Wilder	Northampton Town	(England) Jay Simpson	Leyton Orient	
December	(England) Shaun Derry	Cambridge United	(England) Gareth Evans	Portsmouth	
January	(England) Chris Wilder	Northampton Town	(England) Ricky Holmes	Northampton Town	
February	(England) Chris Wilder	Northampton Town	(England) Bradley Fewster	York City	
March	(England) Darrell Clarke	Bristol Rovers	(England) Matty Taylor	Bristol Rovers	
April	(England) Neal Ardley	AFC Wimbledon	(Ghana) Tarique Fosu	Accrington Stanley	
