= Bradley Pritchard =

Zimbabwean footballer (born 1985)

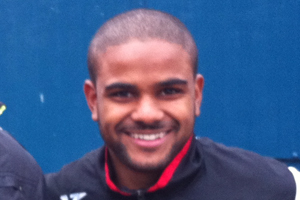
- Pritchard in 2011

Personal information
- Full name: Bradley Pritchard
- Date of birth: 19 December 1985 (age 40)
- Place of birth: Harare, Zimbabwe
- Height: 1.74 m (5 ft 9 in)
- Position: Midfielder

Senior career*
Years	Team	Apps	(Gls)
2005–2006	Carshalton Athletic	?	(?)
2006–2008	Nuneaton Borough	48	(2)
2008–2010	Tamworth	40	(5)
2010–2011	Hayes & Yeading United	46	(14)
2011–2014	Charlton Athletic	79	(3)
2014–2016	Leyton Orient	60	(1)
2016	→ Stevenage (loan)	4	(0)
2016–2018	Greenwich Borough	85	(2)
2018–2021	Cray Wanderers	67	(9)
2021–2024	Lewes	103	(8)
2024	Beckenham Town	2	(0)
2024–2025	Phoenix Sports	29	(0)
Total		563+	(44)

Managerial career
- 2025: Lewes
- * Club domestic league appearances and goals as of 17:27, 8 May 2025 (UTC)

Bradley Pritchard (born 19 December 1985) is a Zimbabwean former professional footballer who played as a midfielder. He previously played for Carshalton Athletic, Nuneaton Borough, Tamworth, Hayes & Yeading United, Charlton Athletic and Cray Wanderers and Lewes.

== Career ==
=== Nuneaton Borough ===
Pritchard joined Conference North side Nuneaton Borough in 2006, but left the club following their liquidation at the end of the 2007–08 season.

=== Tamworth ===
Pritchard then joined local rivals Tamworth. After finding the net four times, Pritchard was awarded Conference North Player of the Month award for October 2008.

=== Hayes & Yeading United ===
Pritchard opted to join Conference National rivals, Hayes & Yeading United for the 2010–11 season, scoring 14 goals in 46 matches, and became a favourite among the fans. His league debut for the club came on 14 August 2010 in a 2–1 home victory over Bath City F.C. His first league goal for the club came on 21 August 2010 in a 2–1 away victory over Grimsby Town F.C. His goal came in the 69th minute.

=== Charlton Athletic ===
During the 2010–11 season, Pritchard worked voluntarily as a performance analyst with Charlton Athletic. Following a short trial with the club, Pritchard signed a one-year playing contract with the option of a further twelve months with Charlton on 25 May 2011. Pritchard's first appearance for The Addicks came in a pre-season friendly against Cardiff City at Estadio Guadalquivir del Coria CF, Spain. The Bluebirds won the game 1–0. Pritchard made his league debut in the 2011–12 season opener against Bournemouth as an 86th-minute substitute for Scott Wagstaff. The game finished as a 3–0 win. He scored his first goal for the club in a 4-0 FA Cup win against FC Halifax Town on 13 November 2011. On 19 June 2012, Pritchard signed a two-year contract extension. Pritchard then scored his first Addicks League goal on 8 December 2012 against Brighton & Hove Albion before adding to his tally later in the season against Barnsley in a 6–0 away win and in a 2–2 draw at Middlesbrough. On 22 May 2014, he was released from Charlton Athletic.

=== Leyton Orient ===
On 10 July 2014, Pritchard signed for Leyton Orient on a two-year contract, becoming the first signing of the Francesco Becchetti era. Pritchard made his Orient league debut in a 2–1 loss to Chesterfield on the opening day of the season. He scored his first goal for the club in a 3–2 Football League Trophy win at Peterborough United on 2 September 2014. In May 2016, he was released from Leyton Orient when it was announced that he would not be retained when his contract expired.

=== Greenwich Borough ===
On 1 September 2016, Pritchard joined Isthmian League Division One South club Greenwich Borough. He made his debut for the club in a 3–0 victory over East Grinstead Town on 6 September.

=== Cray Wanderers ===
On 19 July 2018, Pritchard joined Cray Wanderers.

=== Lewes ===
On 21 May 2021, Pritchard joined Lewes.

=== Beckenham Town ===
In June 2024, Pritchard joined Isthmian South East Division side Beckenham Town. Having held a coaching role, he departed the club on 30 September 2024, following the resignation of manager Darren Anslow.

=== Phoenix Sports ===
On 3 October 2024, Pritchard joined fellow Isthmian South East Division side Phoenix Sports, once again following Anslow in the role of player-coach.

== Coaching career ==
On 8 May 2025, Pritchard was appointed manager of former club Lewes. He departed the club by mutual consent on 22 October 2025 following a mixed start to the season.

== Honours ==
Tamworth

- Conference North: 2008–09

Charlton Athletic

- Football League One: 2011–12

Individual

- Conference North Player of the Month: October 2008
