= 2011–12 Leyton Orient F.C. season =

Leyton Orient F.C.
2011–12 season
- Chairman: Barry Hearn
- Manager: Russell Slade
- Stadium: Brisbane Road
- League One: 20th
- FA Cup: 2nd round – lost to Gillingham
- League Cup: 3rd round – lost to Blackburn Rovers
- League Trophy: 1st round – lost to Dagenham & Redbridge
- Top goalscorer: League: Kevin Lisbie, 12; All: Kevin Lisbie, 12
- Highest home attendance: League: 6,196 v Sheffield Wednesday, 24 March 2012; Overall: as above
- Lowest home attendance: League: 3,258 v A.F.C. Bournemouth, 13 September 2011; Overall: 1,420, v Dagenham & Redbridge, League Trophy, 7 September 2011
- Average home league attendance: League: 4,298; Overall: 4,088
Home colours	Away colours

The 2011–12 Leyton Orient F.C. season was the 113th season in the history of Leyton Orient Football Club, their 96th in the Football League, and sixth consecutive season in the third tier of the English football league system. The club finished the season one place above the relegation zone.

== Squad ==
On 8 September 2011, it was announced that striker Jake Argent had been forced to retire from football at the age of 19, due to an anterior cruciate ligament injury shortly after signing his first professional contract in July 2010, during a pre-season friendly match against Cambridge United. Argent had attempted to return to playing twice, in January and July 2011, but he suffered further cartilage damage. He was unable to make any first team appearances for Leyton Orient, apart from two friendlies against Cambridge and St Albans City in July 2010.

On 17 November 2011, defender Elliott Omozusi was convicted of intimidating a witness in a murder trial, and was sentenced to two and a half years in prison. His Orient contract was subsequently terminated.

== Playing staff ==
- Statistics include only League, FA Cup and League Cup appearances and goals (complete to the end of the 2011–12 season)

No.	Name	Nat.	Place of birth	Date of birth	Position	Club apps.	Club goals	Int. caps	Int. goals	Previous club	Date joined
1	Jamie Jones	ENG	Kirkby	18 February 1989 (age 37)	GK	104	0	0	0	Everton	30 June 2008
2	Syam Ben Youssef	TUN	Marseille	31 March 1989 (age 37)	DF	9	0	0	0	Espérance	14 January 2012
3	Ryan Dickson	ENG	Saltash	14 December 1986 (age 39)	DF	9	0	0	0	Southampton (loan)	9 February 2012
4	Ben Chorley	ENG	Sidcup	30 September 1982 (age 44)	DF	121	7	0	0	Tranmere Rovers	17 June 2009
5	Scott Cuthbert	SCO	Alexandria	15 June 1987 (age 39)	DF	37	1	0	0	Swindon Town	3 June 2011
6	Terrell Forbes	ENG	Southwark	17 August 1981 (age 45)	DF	88	2	0	0	Yeovil Town	26 May 2010
7	Dean Cox	ENG	Cuckfield	12 August 1987 (age 39)	MF	96	19	0	0	Brighton & Hove Albion	2 June 2010
9	Kevin Lisbie	JAM	Hackney	17 October 1978 (age 48)	FW	38	12	0	0	Ipswich Town	9 September 2011
10	Jamie Cureton	ENG	Bristol	28 August 1975 (age 51)	FW	23	1	0	0	Exeter City	28 June 2011
12	Lee Butcher	ENG	Waltham Forest	11 October 1988 (age 38)	GK	36	0	0	0	Tottenham Hotspur	25 May 2010
14	Leon McSweeney	IRE	Cork	19 December 1983 (age 42)	MF	33	0	0	0	Hartlepool United	16 June 2011
15	George Porter	ENG	Bexley	27 June 1992 (age 34)	MF	39	2	0	0	Cray Wanderers	14 May 2010
16	Matthew Spring	ENG	Harlow	17 November 1979 (age 47)	MF	93	7	0	0	Charlton Athletic	30 June 2010
17	Marc Laird	SCO	Edinburgh	23 January 1986 (age 40)	MF	26	2	0	0	Millwall	11 July 2011
18	Jonathan Téhoué	FRA	Paris	3 May 1984 (age 42)	FW	74	16	0	0	UJA Alfortville	12 January 2010
19	Mike Cestor	FRA	Paris	30 April 1992 (age 34)	DF	6	0	0	0	Trainee	December 2009
20	Jimmy Smith	ENG	Newham	7 January 1987 (age 39)	MF	141	19	0	0	Chelsea	10 July 2009
22	Moses Odubajo	ENG	Greenwich	28 July 1993 (age 33)	MF	4	1	0	0	Trainee	17 September 2010
23	Billy Lobjoit	ENG	Edgware	3 September 1993 (age 33)	FW	1	0	0	0	Trainee	7 September 2011
24	Tom Lovelock	ENG	Harlow	14 May 1993 (age 33)	GK	0	0	0	0	Trainee	5 October 2010
25	Jamie Smith	ENG	Leytonstone	12 September 1989 (age 37)	MF	1	0	0	0	Brighton & Hove Albion	8 March 2012
26	Dean Leacock	ENG	Thornton Heath	10 June 1984 (age 42)	DF	16	0	0	0	Derby County	14 January 2012
28	Paul Rachubka	ENG	San Luis Obispo	21 May 1981 (age 45)	GK	8	0	0	0	Leeds United (loan)	May 2012
29	Jamal Campbell-Ryce	JAM	Lambeth	6 April 1983 (age 43)	MF	27	4	0	0	Bristol City (loan)	8 March 2012
30	Afolabi Obafemi	ENG	London	24 November 1994 (age 31)	FW	1	0	0	0	Trainee	5 May 2012
39	Dave Mooney	IRE	Dublin	30 October 1984 (age 42)	FW	41	7	0	0	Reading	23 July 2011
Players who have appeared in Leyton Orient's squad this season but who had left the club before the end of the season:
	Alex Revell	ENG	Cambridge	7 July 1983 (age 43)	FW	55	16	0	0	Southend United	1 July 2010
	Jake Argent	ENG	Enfield	9 December 1991 (age 34)	FW	0	0	0	0	Trainee	Summer 2010
	Michael Richardson	ENG	Newcastle upon Tyne	17 March 1992 (age 34)	MF	4	1	0	0	Newcastle United (loan)	5 August 2011
	Elliott Omozusi	ENG	Hackney	15 December 1988 (age 37)	DF	59	0	0	0	Fulham	2 June 2010
	Tom Clarke	ENG	Halifax	21 December 1987 (age 38)	DF, MF	12	0	0	0	Huddersfield Town (loan)	9 September 2011
	Ben Alnwick	ENG	Prudhoe	1 January 1987 (age 39)	GK	8	0	0	0	Tottenham Hotspur (loan)	9 September 2011
	Tony Craig	ENG	Greenwich	20 April 1985 (age 41)	DF	4	0	0	0	Millwall (loan)	24 November 2011
	David Button	ENG	Stevenage	27 February 1989 (age 37)	GK	2	0	0	0	Tottenham Hotspur (loan)	25 August 2011
	Charlie Daniels	ENG	Harlow	7 September 1986 (age 40)	DF, MF	169	4	0	0	Tottenham Hotspur	6 January 2009
	Lee Cook	ENG	Hammersmith	3 August 1982 (age 44)	MF	9	1	0	0	Queens Park Rangers (loan)	24 November 2011
	Stephen Dawson	IRE	Dublin	4 December 1985 (age 40)	MF	72	4	0	0	Bury	4 June 2010
	Adam Chicksen	ENG	Milton Keynes	27 September 1991 (age 35)	DF	3	0	0	0	Milton Keynes Dons (loan)	1 January 2012
	Marek Štěch	CZE	Prague	28 January 1990 (age 36)	GK	2	0	0	0	West Ham United (loan)	24 February 2012
	Adam Reed	ENG	Hartlepool	8 May 1991 (age 35)	MF	11	0	0	0	Sunderland (loan)	8 March 2012
	Calvin Andrew	ENG	Luton	19 December 1986 (age 39)	FW	10	0	0	0	Crystal Palace (loan)	1 March 2012
	Solomon Taiwo	ENG	Lagos	29 April 1985 (age 41)	MF	5	0	0	0	Cardiff City (loan)	26 January 2012

== Transfers ==
Players transferred in
Date	Pos.	Name	From	Fee	Ref.
3 June 2011	DF	(Scotland) Scott Cuthbert	Swindon Town	Free	
16 June 2011	MF	(Republic of Ireland) Leon McSweeney	Hartlepool United	Free	
28 June 2011	FW	(England) Jamie Cureton	Exeter City	Free	
11 July 2011	MF	(Scotland) Marc Laird	Millwall	Undisclosed	
23 July 2011	FW	(Republic of Ireland) Dave Mooney	Reading	Free	
9 September 2011	FW	(Jamaica) Kevin Lisbie	Free agent	Free	
14 January 2012	DF	(England) Dean Leacock	Free agent	Free	
14 January 2012	DF	(Tunisia) Syam Ben Youssef	Free agent	Free	
8 March 2012	MF	(England) Jamie Smith	Free agent	Free	
Players transferred out
Date	Pos.	Name	To	Fee	Ref.
17 May 2011	DF	(England) Aaron Brown	Aldershot Town	Free	
29 June 2011	FW	(England) Scott McGleish	Bristol Rovers	Free	
30 June 2011	FW	(England) Ryan Jarvis	Walsall	Free	
30 June 2011	MF	(England) Harry Beautyman	Sutton United	Free	
1 July 2011	DF	(England) Andy Whing	Oxford United	Free	
8 July 2011	MF	(England) Adam Chambers	Walsall	Free	
31 August 2011	FW	(England) Alex Revell	Rotherham United	Undisclosed	
January 2012	DF	(England) Charlie Daniels	AFC Bournemouth	Undisclosed	
31 January 2012	MF	(Republic of Ireland) Stephen Dawson	Barnsley	Undisclosed	
Players loaned in
Date from	Pos.	Name	From	Date to	Ref.
5 August 2011	MF	(England) Michael Richardson	Newcastle United	5 September 2011	
25 August 2011	GK	(England) David Button	Tottenham Hotspur	1 January 2012	
9 September 2011	MF	(England) Tom Clarke	Huddersfield Town	10 December 2011	
9 September 2011	GK	(England) Ben Alnwick	Tottenham Hotspur	9 December 2011	
24 November 2011	MF	(England) Lee Cook	Queens Park Rangers	21 January 2012	
24 November 2011	DF	(England) Tony Craig	Millwall	28 December 2011	
1 January 2012	DF	(England) Adam Chicksen	Milton Keynes Dons	1 February 2012	
26 January 2012	MF	(England) Solomon Taiwo	Cardiff City	May 2012	
9 February 2012	DF	(England) Ryan Dickson	Southampton	May 2012	
24 February 2012	GK	(Czech Republic) Marek Štěch	West Ham United	24 March 2012	
1 March 2012	FW	(England) Calvin Andrew	Crystal Palace	May 2012	
6 March 2012	GK	(England) Paul Rachubka	Leeds United	May 2012	
8 March 2012	MF	(England) Adam Reed	Sunderland	May 2012	
8 March 2012	MF	(Jamaica) Jamal Campbell-Ryce	Bristol City	May 2012	
Players loaned out
Date from	Pos.	Name	To	Date to	Ref.
19 August 2011	MF	(France) Mike Cestor	Woking	19 September 2011	
18 November 2011	GK	(England) Tom Lovelock	Farnborough	17 February 2012	
24 November 2011	DF	(England) Charlie Daniels	AFC Bournemouth	January 2012	
12 January 2012	MF	(France) Mike Cestor	Woking	12 March 2012	
13 January 2012	MF	(England) Moses Odubajo	Sutton United	11 February 2012	
21 January 2012	FW	(England) Billy Lobjoit	Boreham Wood	6 March 2012	
1 March 2012	FW	(England) Jamie Cureton	Exeter City	May 2012	
25 February 2012	MF	(England) Moses Odubajo	Bishop's Stortford		
7 March 2012	FW	(France) Jonathan Téhoué	Swindon Town	May 2012	

== 2011-12 squad statistics ==
As of 5 May 2012

- Figures in brackets indicate appearances as a substitute
- Players in italics are loan players

No.	Pos.	Name	League		FA Cup		League Cup		Other		Total		Discipline	
No.	Pos.	Name	Apps	Goals	Apps	Goals	Apps	Goals	Apps	Goals	Apps	Goals	Yellow card	Red card
1	GK	(England) Jamie Jones	6	0	0	0	0	0	0	0	6	0	0	0
2	DF	(Tunisia) Syam Ben Youssef	6 (3)	0	0	0	0	0	0	0	6 (3)	0	2	0
3	DF	(England) Ryan Dickson	9	0	0	0	0	0	0	0	9	0	2	2
4	DF	(England) Ben Chorley	30 (2)	1	1	0	3	1	1	0	35 (2)	2	4	1
5	DF	(Scotland) Scott Cuthbert	33	1	2	0	2	0	0	0	37	1	6	1
6	DF	(England) Terrell Forbes	38 (1)	0	1 (1)	0	2 (1)	0	1	0	42 (3)	0	6	0
7	MF	(England) Dean Cox	35 (3)	7	1	0	3	1	1	0	40 (3)	8	3	0
9	FW	(Jamaica) Kevin Lisbie	34 (3)	12	1	0	0	0	0	0	35 (3)	12	4	0
10	FW	(England) Jamie Cureton	9 (10)	1	0 (2)	0	1 (1)	0	0	0	10 (13)	1	0	0
12	GK	(England) Lee Butcher	23	0	0	0	2	0	1	0	26	0	3	0
14	MF	(Republic of Ireland) Leon McSweeney	28 (1)	0	2	0	1 (1)	0	0 (1)	0	31 (3)	0	7	1
15	MF	(England) George Porter	9 (25)	1	2	1	1 (1)	0	0 (1)	0	12 (27)	2	1	0
16	MF	(England) Matthew Spring	41	4	2	1	2	0	0	0	45	5	5	0
17	MF	(Scotland) Marc Laird	11 (11)	2	1 (1)	0	0 (2)	0	1	0	13 (14)	2	1	0
18	FW	(France) Jonathan Téhoué	4 (10)	3	0	0	1 (1)	0	1	0	6 (11)	3	1	1
19	DF	(France) Mike Cestor	1	0	0	0	0 (1)	0	0	0	1 (1)	0	0	0
20	MF	(England) Jimmy Smith	35 (3)	6	1	1	3	0	1	0	40 (3)	7	3	0
22	MF	(England) Moses Odubajo	1 (2)	1	0 (1)	0	0	0	0 (1)	0	1 (4)	1	0	0
23	FW	(England) Billy Lobjoit	0 (1)	0	0	0	0	0	0	0	0 (1)	0	0	0
24	GK	(England) Tom Lovelock	0	0	0	0	0	0	0	0	0	0	0	0
25	MF	(England) Jamie Smith	0 (1)	0	0	0	0	0	0	0	0 (1)	0	0	0
26	DF	(England) Dean Leacock	16	0	0	0	0	0	0	0	16	0	5	0
28	GK	(England) Paul Rachubka	8	0	0	0	0	0	0	0	8	0	0	0
29	MF	(Jamaica) Jamal Campbell-Ryce	7 (1)	1	0	0	0	0	0	0	7 (1)	1	0	0
30	FW	(England) Afolabi Obafemi	0 (1)	0	0	0	0	0	0	0	0 (1)	0	0	0
39	FW	(Republic of Ireland) Dave Mooney	28 (9)	5	1 (1)	0	2	2	1	1	32 (10)	8	4	0
Players who have appeared in Leyton Orient's squad this season but who had left the club before the end of the season:
2	DF	(England) Elliott Omozusi	8 (2)	0	0	0	2 (1)	0	1	0	11 (3)	0	4	0
3	DF	(England) Tony Craig	4	0	0	0	0	0	0	0	4	0	1	0
8	MF	(Republic of Ireland) Stephen Dawson	20	1	2	0	1	1	1	0	24	2	3	0
8	MF	(England) Adam Reed	10 (1)	0	0	0	0	0	0	0	10 (1)	0	2	0
9	FW	(England) Alex Revell	4 (1)	0	0	0	1	0	0	0	5 (1)	0	0	0
11	DF	(England) Charlie Daniels	13	0	1	0	3	0	1	0	18	0	2	1
11	DF	(England) Adam Chicksen	3	0	0	0	0	0	0	0	3	0	0	0
11	FW	(England) Calvin Andrew	2 (8)	0	0	0	0	0	0	0	2 (8)	0	0	0
21	FW	(England) Jake Argent	0	0	0	0	0	0	0	0	0	0	0	0
21	MF	(England) Lee Cook	8	1	1	0	0	0	0	0	9	1	0	0
21	MF	(England) Solomon Taiwo	2 (3)	0	0	0	0	0	0	0	2 (3)	0	0	1
23	MF	(England) Michael Richardson	1 (2)	0	0	0	1	1	0	0	2 (2)	1	1	0
25	MF	(England) Tom Clarke	10	0	1	0	1	0	0	0	12	0	1	0
26	GK	(England) Ben Alnwick	6	0	2	0	0	0	0	0	8	0	0	0
27	GK	(England) David Button	1	0	0	0	1	0	0	0	2	0	0	0
27	GK	(Czech Republic) Marek Štěch	2	0	0	0	0	0	0	0	2	0	0	0

=== Top scorers ===
Place	Position	Name	League One	FA Cup	League Cup	FL Trophy	Total
1	FW	Kevin Lisbie	12	0	0	0	12
2=	FW	Dave Mooney	5	0	2	1	8
2=	MF	Dean Cox	7	0	1	0	8
4	MF	Jimmy Smith	6	1	0	0	7
5	MF	Matthew Spring	4	1	0	0	5
6	FW	Jonathan Téhoué	3	0	0	0	3
7=	DF	Ben Chorley	1	0	1	0	2
7=	MF	Stephen Dawson	1	0	1	0	2
7=	MF	Marc Laird	2	0	0	0	2
7=	MF	George Porter	1	1	0	0	2
11=	MF	Jamal Campbell-Ryce	1	0	0	0	1
11=	MF	Lee Cook	1	0	0	0	1
11=	FW	Jamie Cureton	1	0	0	0	1
11=	DF	Scott Cuthbert	1	0	0	0	1
11=	MF	Moses Odubajo	1	0	0	0	1
11=	MF	Michael Richardson	0	0	1	0	1
	–	Own goals	1	0	0	0	1
		TOTALS	48	3	6	1	58

== Results ==
=== Pre-season friendlies ===
12 July 2011	Braintree Town	1–3	Leyton Orient	Cressing Road, Braintree
19:30	Jai Reason 17' (pen.)	Leyton Orient report	Jonathan Téhoué 45'; Kieran Djilali 51', 57'

15 July 2011	Ilves	2–3	Leyton Orient	Tammela Stadion, Tampere
17:00	Jaako Ruuskanen 61'; Matti Jokinen 76'	Leyton Orient report	Dean Cox 44'; Alex Revell 75'; Charlie Daniels 80' (pen.)	Attendance: 2,464

19 July 2011	SJK	0–5	Leyton Orient	Seinäjoen keskuskenttä, Seinäjoki
17:00		Leyton Orient report	George Porter 5', 9', 49' (pen.); Stephen Dawson 14'; Jimmy Smith 75'	Attendance: 1,368

20 July 2011	FF Jaro	2–2	Leyton Orient	Jakobstads Centralplan, Jakobstad
16:00	Alexei Eremenko 55'; Venance Zézé 56'	Leyton Orient report	Leon McSweeney 57'; Ben Chorley 90+1' (pen.)

23 July 2011	Dagenham & Redbridge	0–0	Leyton Orient	Victoria Road, Dagenham
15:00		Leyton Orient report		Attendance: 961

26 July 2011	Gillingham	0–1	Leyton Orient	Priestfield Stadium, Gillingham
19:30		Leyton Orient report	Dave Mooney 30'	Referee: Mike Bull

29 July 2011	Leyton Orient	1–4	Tottenham Hotspur XI	Brisbane Road, Leyton
19:30	Stephen Dawson 42'	Leyton Orient report	Peter Crouch 22', 34'; Scott Cuthbert 50' (o.g.); Niko Kranjčar 70'	Attendance: 3,459; Referee: Gavin Ward

=== League One ===
6 August 2011 1	Walsall	1–0	Leyton Orient	Banks's Stadium, Walsall
15:00	Adam Chambers 21'	BBC report		Attendance: 4,753; Referee: Waugh

13 August 2011 2	Leyton Orient	0–1	Tranmere Rovers	Brisbane Road, Leyton
15:00		BBC report	David Buchanan 60'	Attendance: 3,658; Referee: Linington

16 August 2011 3	Leyton Orient	1–3	Wycombe Wanderers	Brisbane Road, Leyton
19:45	Dean Cox 16'	BBC report	Ben Strevens 8'; Scott Donnelly 18' (pen.); Joel Grant 50'	Attendance: 3,503; Referee: Ward

20 August 2011 4	Brentford	5–0	Leyton Orient	Griffin Park, Brentford
15:00	Niall McGinn 6'; Leon Legge 52'; Sam Saunders 54', 75'; Marcus Bean 89'	BBC report		Attendance: 5,399; Referee: Haines

27 August 2011 5	Leyton Orient	1–2	Carlisle United	Brisbane Road, Leyton
15:00	Jimmy Smith 53'	BBC report	Lee Miller 68', 87'	Attendance: 3,524; Referee: Whitestone

3 September 2011 6	Chesterfield	0–0	Leyton Orient	B2net Stadium, Chesterfield
15:00		BBC report		Attendance: 6,197; Referee: Sutton

10 September 2011 7	Colchester United	1–1	Leyton Orient	Community Stadium, Colchester
15:00	Anthony Wordsworth 43'	BBC report	Jimmy Smith 90+1'	Attendance: 4,258; Referee: Andy D'Urso

13 September 2011 8	Leyton Orient	1–3	AFC Bournemouth	Brisbane Road, Leyton
19:45	Mathieu Baudry 23' (o.g.)	BBC report	Harry Arter 20' (pen.); Wesley Thomas 74'; Marc Pugh 81'	Attendance: 3,258; Referee: Coote

17 September 2011 9	Leyton Orient	1–3	Oldham Athletic	Brisbane Road, Leyton
15:00	George Porter 18'	BBC report	Shefki Kuqi 49'; Reuben Reid 65'; Matt Smith 89'	Attendance: 3,699; Referee: East

24 September 2011 10	Huddersfield Town	2–2	Leyton Orient	Galpharm Stadium, Huddersfield
15:00	Alan Lee 22'; Jack Hunt 67'	BBC report	Kevin Lisbie 85'; Ben Chorley 90+1'	Attendance: 12,269; Referee: Lewis

1 October 2011 11	Leyton Orient	2–1	Preston North End	Brisbane Road, Leyton
15:00	Dean Cox 36', 45+1'	BBC report	Paul Coutts 2'	Attendance: 4,384; Referee: Madley

8 October 2011 12	Scunthorpe United	2–3	Leyton Orient	Glanford Park, Scunthorpe
15:00	Andy Barcham 31', 69'	BBC report	Kevin Lisbie 46', 50'; Scott Cuthbert 67'	Attendance: 4,234; Referee: Mark Heywood

15 October 2011 13	Leyton Orient	1–0	Bury	Brisbane Road, Leyton
15:00	Dean Cox 45+1'	BBC report		Attendance: 3,943; Referee: Deadman

22 October 2011 14	Leyton Orient	1–1	Sheffield United	Brisbane Road, Leyton
15:00	Kevin Lisbie 90+6'	BBC report	Chris Porter 84'	Attendance: 5,928; Referee: Langford

25 October 2011 15	Yeovil Town	2–2	Leyton Orient	Huish Park, Yeovil
19:45	Kieran Agard 37'; Bondz N'Gala 41'	BBC report	Dave Mooney 30', 87' (pen.)	Attendance: 3,121; Referee: Collins

29 October 2011 16	Rochdale	0–2	Leyton Orient	Spotland, Rochdale
15:00		BBC report	Jimmy Smith 12'; Dave Mooney 65'	Attendance: 2,322; Referee: Adcock

5 November 2011 17	Leyton Orient	1–1	Hartlepool United	Brisbane Road, Leyton
15:00	Dean Cox 23'	BBC report	Neil Austin 54' (pen.)	Attendance: 4,424; Referee: Pawson

19 November 2011 18	Leyton Orient	0–0	Stevenage	Brisbane Road, Leyton
15:00		BBC report		Attendance: 4,862; Referee: Berry

26 November 2011 19	Sheffield Wednesday	1–0	Leyton Orient	Hillsborough Stadium, Sheffield
15:00	Reda Johnson 19'	BBC report		Attendance: 18,355; Referee: Mathieson

10 December 2011 20	Leyton Orient	3–0	Exeter City	Brisbane Road, Leyton
15:00	Kevin Lisbie 65' (pen.), 87' (pen.); Jonathan Téhoué 75'	BBC report		Attendance: 4,291; Referee: Andy D'Urso

17 December 2011 21	Notts County	1–2	Leyton Orient	Meadow Lane, Nottingham
15:00	Lee Hughes 86'	BBC report	Stephen Dawson 44'; Jonathan Téhoué 85'	Attendance: 5,830; Referee: Haines

26 December 2011 22	Leyton Orient	0–3	Milton Keynes Dons	Brisbane Road, Leyton
13:00		BBC report	Dean Bowditch 37'; Adam Smith 57'; Charlie MacDonald 63'	Attendance: 4,162; Referee: Phillips

31 December 2011 23	Leyton Orient	1–0	Charlton Athletic	Brisbane Road, Leyton
17:20	Matthew Spring 25'	BBC report		Attendance: 5,097; Referee: Whitestone

2 January 2012 24	Stevenage	0–1	Leyton Orient	Broadhall Way, Stevenage
15:00		BBC report	Lee Cook 15'	Attendance: 5,351; Referee: Sheldrake

7 January 2012 25	Carlisle United	4–1	Leyton Orient	Brunton Park, Carlisle
15:00	François Zoko 1'; Matty Robson 30'; Tom Taiwo 37'; James Berrett 73'	BBC report	Jamie Cureton 85'	Attendance: 4,964; Referee: Sarginson

14 January 2012 26	Leyton Orient	1–1	Chesterfield	Brisbane Road, Leyton
15:00	Dave Mooney 42'	BBC report	Jimmy Juan 69'	Attendance: 4,174; Referee: Scott

21 January 2012 27	Preston North End	0–2	Leyton Orient	Deepdale, Preston
15:00		BBC report	Marc Laird 67'; Jimmy Smith 80'	Attendance: 11,436; Referee: Woolmer

28 January 2012 28	Leyton Orient	0–1	Colchester United	Brisbane Road, Leyton
15:00		BBC report	Terrell Forbes 28' (o.g.)	Attendance: 4,659; Referee: Haywood

14 February 2012 29	AFC Bournemouth	1–2	Leyton Orient	Dean Court, Bournemouth
19:45	Marc Pugh 34'	BBC report	Kevin Lisbie 17'; Jimmy Smith 75'	Attendance: 5,412; Referee: Williamson

18 February 2012 30	Leyton Orient	1–3	Scunthorpe United	Brisbane Road, Leyton
15:00	Jonathan Téhoué 34'	BBC report	Josh Walker 71'; Andy Barcham 85'; Jon Parkin 89'	Attendance: 4,055; Referee: Sheldrake

25 February 2012 31	Bury	1–1	Leyton Orient	Gigg Lane, Bury
15:00	Lateef Elford-Alliyu 68'	BBC report	Matthew Spring 27'	Attendance: 2,807; Referee: Bobby Madley

3 March 2012 32	Leyton Orient	1–1	Walsall	Brisbane Road, Leyton
15:00	Dean Cox 34'	BBC report	Olly Lancashire 90+5'	Attendance: 4,183; Referee: Andy D'Urso

6 March 2012 33	Wycombe Wanderers	4–2	Leyton Orient	Adams Park, High Wycombe
19:45	Stuart Beavon 7'; Paul Hayes 26'; Matt Bloomfield 33'; Ben Strevens 39'	BBC report	Matthew Spring 46'; Marc Laird 74'	Attendance: 3,564; Referee: Philips

10 March 2012 34	Tranmere Rovers	2–0	Leyton Orient	Prenton Park, Tranmere
15:00	Andy Robinson 35'; Enoch Showunmi 45'	BBC report		Attendance: 6,824; Referee: Madley

17 March 2012 35	Leyton Orient	2–0	Brentford	Brisbane Road, Leyton
15:00	Kevin Lisbie 29'; Jimmy Smith 45'	BBC report		Attendance: 4,173; Referee: Tierney

20 March 2012 36	Milton Keynes Dons	4–1	Leyton Orient	Stadium mk, Milton Keynes
19:45	Charlie MacDonald 3'; Shaun Williams 23'; Jabo Ibehre 80'; Daniel Powell 84'	BBC report	Kevin Lisbie 13'	Attendance: 6,842; Referee: Danny McDermid

24 March 2012 37	Leyton Orient	0–1	Sheffield Wednesday	Brisbane Road, Leyton
15:00		BBC report	Reda Johnson 49'	Attendance: 6,196; Referee: Drysdale

27 March 2012 38	Oldham Athletic	0–1	Leyton Orient	Boundary Park, Oldham
19:45		BBC report	Dave Mooney 70'	Attendance: 4,145; Referee: Boyeson

31 March 2012 39	Charlton Athletic	2–0	Leyton Orient	The Valley, Charlton
15:00	Scott Wagstaff 7'; Dany N'Guessan 82'	BBC report		Referee: Brown

3 April 2012 40	Leyton Orient	1–3	Huddersfield Town	Brisbane Road, Leyton
19:45	Matthew Spring 14'	BBC report	Jimmy Smith 18' (o.g.); Jordan Rhodes 45+1', 90'	Attendance: 3,674; Referee: Linington

6 April 2012 41	Leyton Orient	0–3	Notts County	Brisbane Road, Leyton
15:00		BBC report	Damion Stewart 70'; Jeff Hughes 76'; Lloyd Sam 90+6'	Attendance: 4,016; Referee: Webb

9 April 2012 42	Exeter City	3–0	Leyton Orient	St James Park, Exeter
15:00	Jake Taylor 4'; Liam Sercombe 60', 63'	BBC report		Attendance: 4,142; Referee: Darren Sheldrake

14 April 2012 43	Sheffield United	3–1	Leyton Orient	Bramall Lane, Sheffield
15:00	Lee Williamson 42'; Michael Doyle 54'; Ched Evans 83'	BBC report	Kevin Lisbie 12'	Attendance: 18,272; Referee: Bates

21 April 2012 44	Leyton Orient	2–2	Yeovil Town	Brisbane Road, Leyton
15:00	Kevin Lisbie 23', 73'	BBC report	Andy Williams 82'; Jonathan Obika 90+2'	Attendance: 4,888; Referee: Haines

28 April 2012 45	Hartlepool United	2–1	Leyton Orient	Victoria Park, Hartlepool
15:00	Antony Sweeney 23'; Ryan Noble 73'	BBC report	Jamal Campbell-Ryce 34'	Attendance: 4,502; Referee: Rushton

5 May 2012 46	Leyton Orient	2–1	Rochdale	Brisbane Road, Leyton
15:00	Dean Cox 32'; Moses Odubajo 41'	BBC report	Reece Gray 75'	Attendance: 4,110; Referee: Attwell

=== Results by round ===
Round	1	2	3	4	5	6	7	8	9	10	11	12	13	14	15	16	17	18	19	20	21	22	23	24	25	26	27	28	29	30	31	32	33	34	35	36	37	38	39	40	41	42	43	44	45	46
Ground	A	H	H	A	H	A	A	H	H	A	H	A	H	H	A	A	H	H	A	H	A	H	H	A	A	H	A	H	A	H	A	H	A	A	H	A	H	A	A	H	H	A	A	H	A	H
Result	L	L	L	L	L	D	D	L	L	D	W	W	W	D	D	W	D	D	L	W	W	L	W	W	L	D	W	L	W	L	D	D	L	L	W	L	L	W	L	L	L	L	L	D	L	W
Position	18	23	24	24	24	24	24	24	24	24	24	23	21	19	19	17	18	17	18	17	17	17	17	15	16	15	12	14	15	15	15	16	16	17	15	17	18	17	18	19	19	20	20	19	20	20

Updated to match(es) played on 5 May 2012. Source: see below
A = Away; H = Home; W = Win; D = Draw; L = Loss

=== FA Cup ===
12 November 2011 1	Leyton Orient	3–0	Bromley	Brisbane Road, Leyton
15:00	Matthew Spring 7'; George Porter 57'; Jimmy Smith 79'	BBC report		Attendance: 4,452; Referee: Sutton

3 December 2011 2	Leyton Orient	0–1	Gillingham	Brisbane Road, Leyton
15:00		BBC report	Curtis Weston 45+1'	Attendance: 3,763; Referee: Gibbs

=== League Cup ===
9 August 2011 1	Southend United	1–1 (3–4 p)	Leyton Orient	Roots Hall, Southend-on-Sea
19:45	Mark Phillips 32'	BBC report	Michael Richardson 23'	Attendance: 4,847; Referee: Fred Graham
	Penalties
	Liam Dickinson (penalty missed); Neil Harris (penalty scored); Sean Clohessy (penalty scored); Jean-Paul Kalala (penalty missed); Ryan Hall (penalty scored)		(penalty scored) Elliot Omozusi; (penalty scored) Charlie Daniels; (penalty scored) Ben Chorley; (penalty missed) Michael Richardson; (penalty scored) Jamie Cureton

30 August 2011 2	Leyton Orient	3–2	Bristol Rovers	Brisbane Road, Leyton
19:45	Dave Mooney 18'; Ben Chorley 23' (pen.); Stephen Dawson 90+4'	BBC report	Chris Zebroski 69'; Eliot Richards 90+1'	Attendance: 1,881; Referee: Woolmer

20 September 2011 3	Blackburn Rovers	3–2	Leyton Orient	Ewood Park, Blackburn
20:00	Jason Roberts 44' (pen.); Rubén Rochina 71'; Simon Vukčević 75'	BBC report	Dave Mooney 64'; Dean Cox 86'	Attendance: 7,104; Referee: Webster

=== Football League Trophy ===
7 September 2011 1	Leyton Orient	1–1 (13–14 p)	Dagenham & Redbridge	Brisbane Road, Leyton
19:45	Dave Mooney 88'	BBC report	Sam Williams 64'	Attendance: 1,420; Referee: Hooper
	Penalties
	Charlie Daniels (penalty scored); Dean Cox (penalty scored); Ben Chorley (penalty scored); Dave Mooney (penalty scored); Leon McSweeney (penalty scored); Marc Laird (penalty scored); Terrell Forbes (penalty scored); Jimmy Smith (penalty scored); Lee Butcher (penalty scored); George Porter (penalty scored); Moses Odubajo (penalty scored); Charlie Daniels (penalty scored); Dean Cox (penalty scored); Ben Chorley (penalty missed)		(penalty scored) Phil Walsh; (penalty scored) Richard Rose; (penalty scored) Olly Lee; (penalty scored) Damian Scannell; (penalty scored) Sam Williams; (penalty scored) Scott Doe; (penalty scored) Dominic Green; (penalty scored) Peter Gain; (penalty scored) Billy Bingham; (penalty scored) Femi Ilesanmi; (penalty scored) James Shea; (penalty scored) Phil Walsh; (penalty scored) Richard Rose; (penalty scored) Olly Lee

== League One final table ==
Pos	Team	Pld	W	D	L	GF	GA	GD	Pts	Promotion, qualification or relegation
18	Scunthorpe United	46	10	22	14	55	59	−4	52	
19	Walsall	46	10	20	16	51	57	−6	50	
20	Leyton Orient	46	13	11	22	48	75	−27	50	
21	Wycombe Wanderers (R)	46	11	10	25	65	88	−23	43	Relegation to Football League Two
22	Chesterfield (R)	46	10	12	24	56	81	−25	42	Relegation to Football League Two

Updated to match(es) played on 5 May 2012. Source: BBC Sport
Rules for classification: 1) Points; 2) Goal difference; 3) Number of goals scored
(R) Relegated
