= Lobjoit =

Lobjoit is a surname. Notable people with the surname include:

- Billy Lobjoit (born 1993), English footballer
- Leon Lobjoit (born 1995), English footballer
