= 2010–11 Leyton Orient F.C. season =

Leyton Orient F.C.
2010–11 season
- Chairman: Barry Hearn
- Manager: Russell Slade
- Stadium: Brisbane Road
- League One: 7th
- FA Cup: Fifth round (Arsenal)
- League Cup: Second round (West Bromwich Albion)
- League Trophy: Second round (Brentford)
- Top goalscorer: League: Alex Revell (13); All: Scott McGleish (18)
- Highest home attendance: League: 7,714 vs Southampton, 9 April 2011; Overall: 9,136 vs Arsenal, FA Cup, 20 February 2011
- Lowest home attendance: League: 2,963 vs Walsall, 28 September 2010; Overall: 1,152 vs Brentford League Trophy, 5 October 2010
- Average home league attendance: League: 4,582; Overall: 4,367
Home colours	Away colours	Third colours

The 2010–11 Leyton Orient F.C. season was the 112th season in the history of Leyton Orient Football Club, their 95th in the Football League, and fifth consecutive season in the third tier of the English football league system.

== Playing staff ==
- Statistics include only League, FA Cup and League Cup appearances and goals. Correct as of the end of the 2010–11 season. Players' ages as of 7 August 2010.

No.	Name	Nat.	Place of birth	Date of birth	Position	Club apps.	Club goals	Int. caps	Int. goals	Previous club	Date joined
1	Jamie Jones	ENG	Kirkby	18 February 1989 (aged 21)	GK	98	0	0	0	Everton	30 June 2008
2	Elliott Omozusi	ENG	Hackney	15 December 1988 (aged 21)	DF	46	0	0	0	Fulham	2 June 2010
3	Michael Liddle	IRE	London	25 December 1989 (aged 20)	DF	1	0	0	0	Sunderland (loan)	5 August 2010
3	Andy Frampton	ENG	Wimbledon	3 September 1979 (aged 30)	DF	1	0	0	0	Millwall (loan)	10 September 2010
3	Andy Whing	ENG	Birmingham	20 September 1984 (aged 25)	DF	28	2	0	0	Brighton & Hove Albion	28 October 2010
4	Ben Chorley	ENG	Sidcup	30 September 1982 (aged 27)	DF	85	5	0	0	Tranmere Rovers	17 June 2009
5	Aaron Brown	ENG	Wolverhampton	23 June 1983 (aged 27)	DF	7	0	0	0	Aldershot Town	26 May 2010
6	Terrell Forbes	ENG	Southwark	17 August 1981 (aged 28)	DF	44	2	0	0	Yeovil Town	26 May 2010
7	Dean Cox	ENG	Cuckfield	12 August 1987 (aged 22)	MF	54	11	0	0	Brighton & Hove Albion	2 June 2010
8	Stephen Dawson	IRE	Dublin	4 December 1985 (aged 24)	MF	49	2	0	0	Bury	4 June 2010
9	Scott McGleish	ENG	Barnet	10 February 1974 (aged 36)	FW	156	43	0	0	Wycombe Wanderers	26 May 2009
10	Adam Chambers	ENG	Sandwell	20 November 1980 (aged 29)	MF	189	9	0	0	Kidderminster Harriers	August 2006
11	Alex Revell	ENG	Cambridge	7 July 1983 (aged 27)	FW	49	16	0	0	Southend United	1 July 2010
12	Lee Butcher	ENG	Waltham Forest	11 October 1988 (aged 21)	GK	11	0	0	0	Tottenham Hotspur	25 May 2010
13	Charlie Daniels	ENG	Harlow	7 September 1986 (aged 23)	DF, MF	152	4	0	0	Tottenham Hotspur	6 January 2009
14	Ryan Jarvis	ENG	Fakenham	11 July 1986 (aged 24)	FW	106	17	0	0	Norwich City	25 June 2008
15	George Porter	ENG	London	27 June 1992 (aged 18)	FW	1	0	0	0	Cray Wanderers	14 May 2010
16	Matthew Spring	ENG	Harlow	17 November 1979 (aged 30)	MF	48	2	0	0	Charlton Athletic	30 June 2010
17	Adrian Pătulea	ROM	Târgovişte	10 November 1984 (aged 25)	FW	26	2	0	0	Lincoln City	23 June 2009
17	Jason Crowe	ENG	Sidcup	30 September 1978 (aged 31)	DF	14	0	0	0	Leeds United	31 January 2011
18	Jonathan Téhoué	FRA	Paris	3 May 1984 (aged 26)	FW	58	13	0	0	UJA Alfortville	12 January 2010
19	Mike Cestor	FRA	Paris	30 April 1992 (aged 18)	DF	4	0	0	0	Trainee	December 2009
20	Jimmy Smith	ENG	Newham	7 January 1987 (aged 23)	MF	99	12	0	0	Chelsea	10 July 2009
21	Jake Argent	ENG	Enfield	9 December 1991 (aged 18)	FW	0	0	0	0	Trainee	Summer 2010
22	Harry Beautyman	ENG	Newham	1 April 1992 (aged 18)	MF	0	0	0	0	Trainee	6 October 2009
23	Josh Millwood	ENG	Islington	17 March 1992 (aged 18)	DF	0	0	0	0	Trainee	Summer 2010
24	Tom Lovelock	ENG	Harlow	14 May 1993 (aged 17)	GK	0	0	0	0	Trainee	5 October 2010
25	James Walker	ENG	Islington	25 November 1987 (aged 22)	FW	29	3	0	0	Gillingham	10 September 2010
25	Tom Carroll	ENG	Watford	28 May 1992 (aged 18)	MF	14	0	0	0	Tottenham Hotspur (loan)	28 January 2011
26	Moses Odubajo	ENG	Greenwich	28 July 1993 (aged 17)	MF	0	0	0	0	Trainee	17 September 2010
27	Paul-Jose M'Poku	BEL	Kinshasa	19 April 1992 (aged 18)	MF	35	3	0	0	Tottenham Hotspur (loan)	24 September 2010
28	Chris Benjamin	ENG			MF	0	0	0	0	Trainee	29 November 2010
29	Harry Kane	ENG	Walthamstow	28 July 1993 (aged 17)	FW	18	5	0	0	Tottenham Hotspur (loan)	7 January 2011
30	Adam Barrett	ENG	Dagenham	29 November 1979 (aged 30)	DF	14	0	0	0	Crystal Palace (loan)	11 March 2011
32	Jason Brown	WAL	Southwark	18 May 1982 (aged 28)	GK	5	0	0	0	Blackburn Rovers (loan)	19 November 2010

== Pre-season friendlies ==
14 July 2010	Cray Wanderers	0–2	Leyton Orient	Hayes Lane, Bromley
7.45 pm BST		(Report)	Ben Chorley 41' pen. Alex Revell 84'	Attendance: 325; Referee: N/K

16 July 2010	St Albans City	0–5	Leyton Orient	Clarence Park, St Albans
7.45 pm BST		(Report)	Alex Revell 8'; Scott McGleish 37', 42', 44'; Matthew Spring 81'	Attendance: 286

28 July 2010	Leyton Orient	2–2	Tottenham Hotspur XI	Brisbane Road, Leyton
7.45 pm BST	Ben Chorley 16' pen. Scott McGleish 20'	(Report)	Ryan Mason 55'; Jonathan Obika 77'	Attendance: 3,198; Referee: Mick Russell

31 July 2010	Cambridge United	1–3	Leyton Orient	Abbey Stadium, Cambridge
3.00 pm BST	Robbie Willmott 90+2' pen.	(Report)	Jonathan Téhoué 28'; Matthew Spring 82'; Scott McGleish 90+3'	Attendance: 1,037

3 August 2010	Dartford	2–2	Leyton Orient	Princes Park, Dartford
7.30 pm BST	Carl Rook 52'; Danny Harris 66'	[ (Report)]	George Porter 49'; Harry Beautyman 55'

== JOMA Cup ==
20 July 2010	Eastleigh	1–2	Leyton Orient	Horsdon Park, Tiverton
8.00 pm BST	Richard Graham 1'	(Report)	Jimmy Smith 5'; Dean Cox 83'

22 July 2010	Leyton Orient	4–0	Truro City	Horsdon Park, Tiverton
7.30 pm BST	Alex Revell 12'; George Porter 30'; Ryan Jarvis 45'; Stephen Dawson 78'	(Report)

24 July 2010	Blackpool	2–1	Leyton Orient	Mill Road, Barnstaple
3.00 pm BST	Francis Jeffers 23'; Ian Evatt 90'	(Report)	Scott McGleish 44'

== League One ==
=== Results by round ===
Round	1	2	3	4	5	6	7	8	9	10	11	12	13	14	15	16	17	18	19	20	21	22	23	24	25	26	27	28	29	30	31	32	33	34	35	36	37	38	39	40	41	42	43	44	45	46
Ground	A	H	A	H	A	H	A	H	H	A	A	H	A	H	A	A	H	A	A	A	H	A	H	H	H	A	H	H	A	A	H	A	H	A	A	H	H	A	H	H	H	A	H	A	H	A
Result	L	L	D	W	L	L	L	W	D	D	L	W	D	W	L	W	D	D	W	L	W	D	W	D	D	D	W	W	W	D	W	W	W	W	L	D	L	L	W	L	D	L	W	W	L	W
Position	15	22	21	15	20	23	23	19	20	22	23	20	21	18	19	17	18	19	16	19	18	18	17	16	15	16	11	11	10	11	9	7	7	7	7	7	7	8	8	8	8	8	8	7	7	7

Updated to match(es) played on 7 May 2011. Source: see below
A = Away; H = Home; W = Win; D = Draw; L = Loss

7 August 2010	Yeovil Town	2–1	Leyton Orient	Huish Park, Yeovil
3.00 pm BST	Dean Bowditch 12'; Luke Freeman 45+3'	(Report)	Alex Revell 40'	Attendance: 4,126; Referee: Mark Haywood

13 August 2010	Leyton Orient	1–3	Charlton Athletic	Brisbane Road, Leyton
7.45 pm BST	Scott McGleish 50'	(Report)	Alan McCormack 28'; Scott Wagstaff 62'; Chris Solly 90+4'	Attendance: 5,535; Referee: James Linington

21 August 2010	Southampton	1–1	Leyton Orient	St Mary's Stadium, Southampton
3.00 pm BST	Rickie Lambert 12'	(Report)	Terrell Forbes 15'	Attendance: 21,468; Referee: Phil Gibbs

28 August 2010	Leyton Orient	3–0	Exeter City	Brisbane Road, Leyton
3.00 pm BST	Alex Revell 39'; Scott McGleish 70'; Dean Cox 80'	(Report)		Attendance: 4,145; Referee: Miller

4 September 2010	Dagenham & Redbridge	2–0	Leyton Orient	Victoria Road, Dagenham
3.00 pm BST	Romain Vincelot 8', 50'	(Report)		Attendance: 4,195; Referee: Fred Graham

11 September 2010	Leyton Orient	1–2	Huddersfield Town	Brisbane Road, Leyton
3.00 pm BST	Dean Cox 79'	(Report)	Scott Arfield 3'; Jordan Rhodes 78'	Attendance: 3,918; Referee: Andy D'Urso

18 September 2010	Notts County	3–2	Leyton Orient	Meadow Lane, Nottingham
3.00 pm BST	Lee Hughes 14', 74'; Craig Westcarr 21'	(Report)	Ryan Jarvis 22'; Matthew Spring 54'	Attendance: 6,256; Referee: Steve Rushton

24 September 2010	Leyton Orient	1–0	Brentford	Brisbane Road, Leyton
7.45 pm BST	Scott McGleish 25'	(Report)		Attendance: 4,485; Referee: Scott

28 September 2010	Leyton Orient	0–0	Walsall	Brisbane Road, Leyton
7.45 pm BST		(Report)		Attendance: 2,963; Referee: Keith Stroud

2 October 2010	Oldham Athletic	1–1	Leyton Orient	Boundary Park, Oldham
3.00 pm BST	Chris Taylor 40'	(Report)	Scott McGleish 79'	Attendance: 3,806; Referee: Bobby Madley

9 October 2010	Sheffield Wednesday	1–0	Leyton Orient	Hillsborough Stadium, Sheffield
3.00 pm BST	Lewis Buxton 52'	(Report)		Attendance: 17,445; Referee: Geoff Eltringham

16 October 2010	Leyton Orient	1–0	Hartlepool United	Brisbane Road, Leyton
3.00 pm BST	Jonathan Téhoué 89'	(Report)		Attendance: 3,605; Referee: Coote

23 October 2010	Swindon Town	2–2	Leyton Orient	County Ground, Swindon
3.00 pm BST	Charlie Austin 62'; Michael Rose 84'	(Report)	Matthew Spring 60'; Alex Revell 76'	Attendance: 8,384; Referee: Trevor Kettle

30 October 2010	Leyton Orient	2–1	Rochdale	Brisbane Road, Leyton
3.00 pm BST	Ben Chorley 48' pen. Dean Cox 66'	(Report)	Chris O'Grady 45'	Attendance: 4,880; Referee: Wright

2 November 2010	Colchester United	3–2	Leyton Orient	Community Stadium, Colchester
7.45 pm GMT	Matt Heath 22'; Dave Mooney 32' pen. Brian Wilson 80'	(Report)	Alex Revell 10', 18'	Attendance: 3,899; Referee: Hegley

13 November 2010	Bristol Rovers	0–3	Leyton Orient	Memorial Stadium, Bristol
3.00 pm GMT		(Report)	Dean Cox 20'; Alex Revell 27', 51'	Attendance: 5,541; Referee: Woolmer

20 November 2010	Leyton Orient	2–2	Bournemouth	Brisbane Road, Leyton
3.00 pm GMT	Jonathan Téhoué 85', 90+2'	(Report)	Marc Pugh 2', 48'	Attendance: 4,531; Referee: Hill

23 November 2010	Peterborough United	2–2	Leyton Orient	London Road, Peterborough
7.45 pm GMT	Aaron McLean 18' pen., 61'	(Report)	Alex Revell 43'; Jimmy Smith 86'	Attendance: 4,423; Referee: Malone

11 December 2010	Tranmere Rovers	1–2	Leyton Orient	Prenton Park, Birkenhead
3.00 pm GMT	Scott Wootton 61'	(Report)	Stephen Dawson 10'; Scott McGleish 45+1'	Attendance: 4,291; Referee: Russell

1 January 2011	Brighton & Hove Albion	5–0	Leyton Orient	Withdean Stadium, Brighton
1.00 pm GMT	Glenn Murray 29', 50', 60'; Jamie Jones o.g. 31'; Ashley Barnes 73'	(Report)		Attendance: 7,198; Referee: Linington

3 January 2011	Leyton Orient	4–2	Colchester United	Brisbane Road, Leyton
3.00 pm GMT	Jimmy Smith 41'; Alex Revell 49'; Paul-Jose M'Poku 75'; Jonathan Téhoué 86'	(Report)	Anthony Wordsworth 69'; Ian Henderson 81'	Attendance: 4,339; Referee: Danny McDermid

15 January 2011	Rochdale	1–1	Leyton Orient	Spotland Stadium, Rochdale
3.00 pm GMT	Terrell Forbes o.g. 35'	(Report)	Ben Chorley 60'	Attendance: 2,371; Referee: Haines

22 January 2011	Leyton Orient	4–0	Sheffield Wednesday	Brisbane Road, Leyton
3.00 pm GMT	Ben Chorley 51' pen. Harry Kane 57'; Alex Revell 79'; Scott McGleish 84'	(Report)		Attendance: 6,449; Referee: Langford

25 January 2011	Leyton Orient	2–2	Milton Keynes Dons	Brisbane Road, Leyton
7.45 pm GMT	Scott McGleish 9'; Terrell Forbes 14'	(Report)	Stephen Gleeson 7'; Sean O'Hanlon 56'	Attendance: 3,131; Referee: Sheldrake

1 February 2011	Leyton Orient	0–0	Brighton & Hove Albion	Brisbane Road, Leyton
7.45 pm GMT		(Report)		Attendance: 5,872; Referee: Horwood

5 February 2011	Bournemouth	1–1	Leyton Orient	Dean Court, Bournemouth
3.00 pm GMT	Michael Symes 39'	(Report)	Dean Cox 90'	Attendance: 6,717; Referee: Tanner

8 February 2011	Leyton Orient	3–0	Swindon Town	Brisbane Road, Leyton
7.45 pm GMT	Dean Cox 12'; Alex Revell 31'; Stephen Dawson 32'	(Report)		Attendance: 4,214; Referee: Phillips

12 February 2011	Leyton Orient	4–1	Bristol Rovers	Brisbane Road, Leyton
3.00 pm GMT	Jimmy Smith 5'; Andy Whing 16'; Harry Kane 77', 82'	(Report)	Jason Crowe o.g. 52'	Attendance: 4,913; Referee: Miller

15 February 2011	Milton Keynes Dons	2–3	Leyton Orient	Stadium:mk, Milton Keynes
7.45 pm GMT	Dean Lewington 7'; Jabo Ibehre 23'	(Report)	Jimmy Smith 17', 39'; Jonathan Téhoué 74'	Attendance: 6,469; Referee: Malone

26 February 2011	Huddersfield Town	2–2	Leyton Orient	Galpharm Stadium, Huddersfield
3.00 pm GMT	Jordan Rhodes 3'; Lee Novak 49'	(Report)	Harry Kane 73'; Jimmy Smith 88'	Attendance: 13,527; Referee: Quinn

5 March 2011	Leyton Orient	2–0	Notts County	Brisbane Road, Leyton
3.00 pm GMT	Dean Cox 8'; Andy Whing 79'	(Report)		Attendance: 4,238; Referee: Hegley

8 March 2011	Walsall	0–2	Leyton Orient	Bescot Stadium, Walsall
7.45 pm GMT		(Report)	Harry Kane 43'; Jonathan Téhoué 56'	Attendance: 3,019; Referee: Woolmer

12 March 2011	Leyton Orient	1–0	Oldham Athletic	Brisbane Road, Leyton
3.00 pm GMT	Paul-Jose M'Poku 87'	(Report)		Attendance: 4,349; Referee: Lewis

15 March 2011	Hartlepool United	0–1	Leyton Orient	Victoria Park, Hartlepool
7.45 pm GMT		(Report)	Jimmy Smith 28'	Attendance: 2,313; Referee: Moss

19 March 2011	Brentford	2–1	Leyton Orient	Griffin Park, Brentford
3.00 pm GMT	Marcus Bean 6'; Gary Alexander 24'	(Report)	Scott McGleish 55'	Attendance: 6,368; Referee: Phillips

22 March 2011	Leyton Orient	1–1	Dagenham & Redbridge	Brisbane Road, Leyton
7.45 pm GMT	Scott McGleish 90+1' pen.	(Report)	Danny Green 12'	Attendance: 4,581; Referee: Kettle

26 March 2011	Leyton Orient	1–5	Yeovil Town	Brisbane Road, Leyton
3.00 pm GMT	Dean Cox 70'	(Report)	Shaun MacDonald 9', 18', 42' pen. Andy Welsh 47'; Dean Bowditch 88'	Attendance: 4,258; Referee: Eltringham

2 April 2011	Charlton Athletic	3–1	Leyton Orient	The Valley, Charlton
3.00 pm BST	Paul Benson 50'; Bradley Wright-Phillips 73'; José Semedo 87'	(Report)	Scott McGleish 16'	Attendance: 15,875; Referee: Hooper

5 April 2011	Leyton Orient	2–0	Plymouth Argyle	Brisbane Road, Leyton
7.45 pm BST	Scott McGleish 4'; Dean Cox 13'	(Report)		Attendance: 3,255; Referee: Naylor

9 April 2011	Leyton Orient	0–2	Southampton	Brisbane Road, Leyton
3.00 pm BST		(Report)	Rickie Lambert 26'; Lee Barnard 88'	Attendance: 7,714; Referee: Mark Clattenburg

12 April 2011	Leyton Orient	0–0	Carlisle United	Brisbane Road, Leyton
7.45 pm BST		(Report)		Attendance: 3,228; Referee: Sutton

16 April 2011	Exeter City	2–1	Leyton Orient	St James Park, Exeter
3.00 pm BST	Jamie Cureton 4', 79'	(Report)	Dean Cox 12'	Attendance: 5,036; Referee: Malone

22 April 2011	Leyton Orient	2–1	Peterborough United	Brisbane Road, Leyton
3.00 pm BST	Gabriel Zakuani o.g. 67'; Ryan Jarvis 90+6'	(Report)	Nathaniel Mendez-Laing 75'	Attendance: 5,476; Referee: Williamson

25 April 2011	Carlisle United	0–1	Leyton Orient	Brunton Park, Carlisle
3.00 pm BST		(Report)	Jonathan Téhoué 36'	Attendance: 4,685; Referee: Brown

30 April 2011	Leyton Orient	0–3	Tranmere Rovers	Brisbane Road, Leyton
3.00 pm BST		(Report)	Aaron Cresswell 8'; Adam McGurk 45', 49'	Attendance: 5,302; Referee: Horwood

7 May 2011	Plymouth Argyle	1–4	Leyton Orient	Home Park, Plymouth
3.00 pm BST	Yannick Bolasie 63'	(Report)	Scott McGleish 13' pen. Dean Cox 15'; Alex Revell 77', 89'	Attendance: 11,501; Referee: Whitestone

== Football League Cup ==
10 August 2010	Swindon Town	1–2	Leyton Orient	County Ground, Swindon
7.45 pm BST	Jon-Paul McGovern 35'	(Report)	Ryan Jarvis 67'; Alex Revell 71'	Attendance: 4,450; Referee: Danny McDermid

24 August 2010	Leyton Orient	0–2	West Bromwich Albion	Brisbane Road, Leyton
7.45 pm BST		(Report)	Pablo Ibáñez 29'; Chris Wood 90+1'	Attendance: 2,349; Referee: Dean Whitestone

== FA Cup ==
6 November 2010	Dagenham & Redbridge	1–1	Leyton Orient	Victoria Road, Dagenham
3.00 pm GMT	Danny Green 45+2'	(Report)	Alex Revell 45'	Attendance: 3,378; Referee: Rushton

16 November 2010	Leyton Orient	3–2	Dagenham & Redbridge	Brisbane Road, Leyton
7.45 pm GMT	Scott McGleish 2', 76'; Alex Revell 24'	(Report)	Danny Green 67' pen. Solomon Taiwo 68'	Attendance: 2,901; Referee: Hooper

29 November 2010	Droylsden	1–1	Leyton Orient	Butcher's Arms Ground, Droylsden
7.45 pm GMT	Ciaran Kilheeney 24'	(Report)	Scott McGleish 73'	Attendance: 1,762; Referee: Webster

7 December 2010	Leyton Orient	8 – 2 (a.e.t.)	Droylsden	Brisbane Road, Leyton
7.45 pm GMT	Ben Chorley 77' pen. Jonathan Téhoué 89', 99', 107'; Paul-Jose M'Poku 93'; Scott McGleish 97', 108', 119'	(Report)	Ciaran Kilheeney 6'; Alex Brown 54'	Attendance: 1,345; Referee: Scott

8 January 2011	Norwich City	0–1	Leyton Orient	Carrow Road, Norwich
3.00 pm GMT		(Report)	Jimmy Smith 20'	Attendance: 18,087; Referee: Whitestone

29 January 2011	Swansea City	1–2	Leyton Orient	Liberty Stadium, Swansea
12.50 pm GMT	Cedric van der Gun 45'	(Report)	Jimmy Smith 35'; Alan Tate o.g. 88'	Attendance: 6,281; Referee: Attwell

20 February 2011	Leyton Orient	1–1	Arsenal	Brisbane Road, Leyton
4.30 pm GMT	Jonathan Téhoué 89'	(Report)	Tomáš Rosický 53'	Attendance: 9,136; Referee: Kevin Friend

2 March 2011	Arsenal	5–0	Leyton Orient	Emirates Stadium, Holloway
7.45 pm GMT	Marouane Chamakh 7'; Nicklas Bendtner 30', 43', 62' pen. Gael Clichy 75'	(Report)		Attendance: 59,361; Referee: Mason

== Johnstone's Paint Trophy ==
1 September 2010	Brighton & Hove Albion	0–2	Leyton Orient	Withdean Stadium, Brighton
7.45 pm BST		(Report)	Dean Cox 21'; Ryan Jarvis 47'	Attendance: 3,124; Referee: Iain Williamson

5 October 2010	Leyton Orient	0–0 (4–5 p)	Brentford	Brisbane Road, Leyton
7.15 pm BST		(Report)		Attendance: 1,152; Referee: Phil Crossley
	Penalties
	Stephen Dawson (penalty scored); Elliot Omozusi (penalty scored); Ben Chorley (penalty scored); Charlie Daniels (penalty scored); Matthew Spring (penalty missed)		Nicky Forster (penalty scored); David Hunt (penalty scored); Sam Saunders (penalty scored); Gary Alexander (penalty scored); Craig Woodman (penalty scored)

== 2010–11 squad statistics ==
- Figures in brackets indicate appearances as a substitute
- Players in italics are loan players

No.	Pos.	Name	League		FA Cup		League Cup		Other		Total		Discipline	
No.	Pos.	Name	Apps	Goals	Apps	Goals	Apps	Goals	Apps	Goals	Apps	Goals	Yellow card	Red card
1	GK	(England) Jamie Jones	35	0	4	0	2	0	1	0	42	0	2	0
2	DF	(England) Elliott Omozusi	40 (1)	0	4	0	2	0	2	0	47 (1)	0	7	0
3	DF	(Republic of Ireland) Michael Liddle	1	0	0	0	0	0	0	0	1	0	0	0
3	DF	(England) Andy Frampton	1	0	0	0	0	0	0	0	1	0	0	0
3	DF	(England) Andy Whing	23 (1)	2	3 (1)	0	0	0	0	0	26 (2)	2	6	0
4	DF	(England) Ben Chorley	28 (1)	3	8	1	2	0	1 (1)	0	39 (2)	4	8	1
5	DF	(England) Aaron Brown	4 (1)	0	1 (1)	0	0	0	2	0	7 (2)	0	2	0
6	DF	(England) Terrell Forbes	32 (2)	2	8	0	2	0	2	0	44 (2)	2	2	1
7	MF	(England) Dean Cox	44 (1)	11	7	0	1 (1)	0	1 (1)	1	53 (3)	12	6	0
8	MF	(Republic of Ireland) Stephen Dawson	39 (1)	2	6 (1)	0	2	0	2	0	49 (2)	2	5	0
9	FW	(England) Scott McGleish	27 (12)	12	6 (2)	6	1 (1)	0	0	0	34 (15)	18	2	0
10	MF	(England) Adam Chambers	23 (6)	0	0 (1)	0	1 (1)	0	1	0	25 (8)	0	4	0
11	FW	(England) Alex Revell	36 (3)	13	8	2	1 (1)	1	0 (1)	0	45 (5)	16	2	0
12	GK	(England) Lee Butcher	8 (1)	0	2	0	0	0	1	0	11 (1)	0	0	0
13	DF	(England) Charlie Daniels	41 (1)	0	8	0	1	0	0 (1)	0	50 (2)	0	2	0
14	FW	(England) Ryan Jarvis	3 (8)	2	0	0	1	1	2	1	6 (8)	4	0	0
15	FW	(England) George Porter	0 (1)	0	0	0	0	0	0	0	0 (1)	0	0	0
16	MF	(England) Matthew Spring	39	2	6 (1)	0	1 (1)	0	2	0	48 (2)	2	7	1
17	FW	(Romania) Adrian Pătulea	0 (1)	0	0	0	0	0	0	0	0 (1)	0	0	0
17	DF	(England) Jason Crowe	5 (7)	0	2	0	0	0	0	0	7 (7)	0	1	0
18	FW	(France) Jonathan Téhoué	9 (23)	7	2 (6)	4	1 (1)	0	1 (1)	0	13 (31)	11	1	0
19	DF	(France) Mike Cestor	2	0	0	0	2	0	0 (1)	0	4 (1)	0	2	0
20	MF	(England) Jimmy Smith	25 (6)	7	7	2	2	0	2	0	36 (6)	9	5	0
21	FW	(England) Jake Argent	0	0	0	0	0	0	0	0	0	0	0	0
22	MF	(England) Harry Beautyman	0	0	0	0	0	0	0	0	0	0	0	0
23	DF	(England) Josh Millwood	0	0	0	0	0	0	0	0	0	0	0	0
24	GK	(England) Tom Lovelock	0	0	0	0	0	0	0	0	0	0	0	0
25	FW	(England) James Walker	0 (11)	0	0 (2)	0	0	0	1	0	1 (13)	0	0	0
25	MF	(England) Tom Carroll	8 (4)	0	1 (1)	0	0	0	0	0	9 (5)	0	0	0
26	MF	(England) Moses Odubajo	0	0	0	0	0	0	0	0	0	0	0	0
27	MF	(Belgium) Paul-Jose M'Poku	9 (18)	2	3 (4)	1	0	0	1	0	13 (22)	3	1	0
28	FW	(England) Chris Benjamin	0	0	0	0	0	0	0	0	0	0	0	0
29	FW	(England) Harry Kane	9 (9)	5	0	0	0	0	0	0	9 (9)	5	2	1
30	DF	(England) Adam Barrett	14	0	0	0	0	0	0	0	14	0	2	0
32	GK	(Wales) Jason Brown	3	0	2	0	0	0	0	0	5	0	0	0

=== Top scorers ===
Place	Position	Name	League One	FA Cup	League Cup	JP Trophy	Total
1	FW	Scott McGleish	12	6	0	0	18
2	FW	Alex Revell	13	2	1	0	16
3	MF	Dean Cox	11	0	0	1	12
4	FW	Jonathan Téhoué	7	4	0	0	11
5	MF	Jimmy Smith	7	2	0	0	9
6	FW	Harry Kane	5	0	0	0	5
7=	DF	Ben Chorley	3	1	0	0	4
7=	FW	Ryan Jarvis	2	0	1	1	4
9	MF	Paul-Jose M'Poku	2	1	0	0	3
10=	MF	Stephen Dawson	2	0	0	0	2
10=	DF	Terrell Forbes	2	0	0	0	2
10=	MF	Matthew Spring	2	0	0	0	2
10=	DF	Andy Whing	2	0	0	0	2
	–	Own goals	1	1	0	0	2
		TOTALS	71	17	2	2	92

=== Pre-season trialists ===
- This is a list of players who went on trial with Orient during the pre-season programme, but did not sign contracts.

Name	Pos.	Apps	Goals	Notes
Daniel Charge	FW	0 (1)	0	Signed for Billericay Town
Craig Dobson	MF	1	0	Signed for Thurrock
Robert Eagle	MF	0 (3)	0	Signed for Grimsby Town
Kenny Gillet	DF	3 (2)	0	Signed for Inverness Caledonian Thistle
Darren Lough	DF	1	0	Ex-Newcastle United defender
Ben Tozer	DF	3 (2)	0	Stayed with Newcastle United
