= Jimmy Smith (footballer, born 1987) =

English footballer

Personal information
- Full name: James Dean Smith
- Date of birth: 7 January 1987 (age 39)
- Place of birth: Newham, England
- Height: 6 ft 0 in (1.83 m)
- Positions: Midfielder; winger

Team information
- Current team: Chelsea (Under-18s assistant)

Youth career
- 1996–2005: Chelsea

Senior career*
Years	Team	Apps	(Gls)
2005–2009	Chelsea	1	(0)
2006–2007	→ Queens Park Rangers (loan)	29	(6)
2007	→ Norwich City (loan)	9	(0)
2008–2009	→ Sheffield Wednesday (loan)	12	(0)
2009	→ Leyton Orient (loan)	16	(1)
2009–2013	Leyton Orient	144	(18)
2013–2014	Stevenage	42	(3)
2014–2020	Crawley Town	154	(20)
2019–2020	→ Yeovil Town (loan)	20	(5)
2020–2021	Yeovil Town	26	(2)
2021	Harlow Town		
2021–2022	Grays Athletic	16	(3)
Total		469	(58)

International career
2002–2003	England U16	1	(0)
2003–2004	England U17	3	(1)
2005–2006	England U19	7	(2)
- * Club domestic league appearances and goals

James Dean Smith (born 7 January 1987) is an English retired professional and semi-professional footballer who played as a winger or midfielder. He is a youth coach at Chelsea, and features occasionally for the U23 side.

Smith began his career at Chelsea at the age of nine, progressing through the youth ranks before signing professional terms with the club in 2005. After featuring regularly for Chelsea's reserve side during the 2005–06 season, Smith made his first-team debut in May 2006. It turned out to be his only appearance for the club. The following season, he joined Championship side Queens Park Rangers on a season-long loan agreement, before spending three months on loan at Norwich City towards the latter months of 2007. Smith was loaned out once again ahead of the 2008–09 campaign, spending the first half of the season with Sheffield Wednesday. He returned to Chelsea in January 2009, only to join League One side Leyton Orient on a loan deal for the remainder of the season.

Smith signed for Orient on a permanent basis in July 2009, signing a two-year contract. He spent four seasons with the club, making over 180 appearances in all competitions. He was released by Orient in April 2013, and signed for Stevenage ahead of the 2013–14 season. Smith signed for League One side Crawley Town in May 2014 for an undisclosed fee and was later made club captain, he spent six years with the Sussex club making over 160 appearances. Smith ended his professional playing career at Yeovil Town in 2021, after which he took up a position at Chelsea as a coach. However, he resumed his career at semi-professional level with Harlow Town later the same year. Smith has represented England at various youth levels.

== Club career ==
=== Chelsea ===
Smith joined the Chelsea Academy aged nine and worked his way through the various youth levels. He signed for the club on professional terms at the age of 18 in 2005, and subsequently made the step up from the academy squad to playing regularly for the reserve side. An attacking midfielder by trade, who can also play on both wings, Smith finished as the reserve side's top goalscorer for the 2005–06 season, predominantly playing in his preferred attacking midfield role. He was made captain of the reserve side during the season. After his impressive season for Chelsea's second-string, he was called up to the first-team by Chelsea manager José Mourinho, and made his only appearance for the Chelsea first-team in the last game of the 2005–06 Premier League campaign, coming on as an 81st-minute substitute for Ricardo Carvalho in a 1–0 defeat to Newcastle United at St James' Park. On his first-team debut, Smith said – "It was amazing – just travelling up with the squad was great but to get on in front of more than 50,000 Geordies was incredible. The players are great, they are always trying to help me and they just told me to take my chance and enjoy the occasion". In the pre-season ahead of the 2006–07 campaign, Smith travelled with the first-team squad on their pre-season tour of the United States. Despite his involvement during pre-season, Smith would not feature again for the Chelsea first-team. Speaking of his time at the West London club, Smith said – "It was frustrating that I never really got the chance. I remember thinking I was involved, then I'd go on loan. I'd come back to a new manager and think I'd have another chance. I was always in and around the first team but things changed".

==== Loan spells ====
To further aid Smith's development, he was loaned out to Championship side Queens Park Rangers (QPR) on an initial one-month agreement in September 2006. He made his debut for QPR in the club's 2–1 away victory over Southampton on 30 September, coming on as a second-half substitute in the match. Smith made his first start on his home debut at Loftus Road in a 3–3 draw with Norwich City, a game in which he scored QPR's first goal of the match midway through the first-half. He scored again three days later, on 17 October 2006, hooking in a volley from a corner to briefly restore parity in a match QPR would go on to lose 2–1 to Derby County, subsequently ending their unbeaten run. After impressing during his month at QPR, his loan deal was extended by a further two months, with QPR manager John Gregory saying – "His professionalism is second to none and it is rubbing off on all the other lads in the squad. He's uncomplicated, goes about his job in the right manner and will only go from strength to strength. We feel very honoured to have a player of his class and potential at the club". Shortly after the loan extension, Smith went on to score three times within the space of a week; firstly netting a brace in a 4–2 home victory over Crystal Palace, before poking in Lee Cook's free-kick in a 3–2 away win at Luton Town. His loan deal at QPR was later extended in December 2006, for the remainder of the season. Smith played regularly during the second half of the campaign, scoring one further goal, the only goal of the game in a 1–0 victory over Coventry City at the Ricoh Arena in April 2007. During his time at QPR, Smith scored six times in 31 appearances.

Ahead of the 2007–08 season, in July 2007, Smith joined Championship side Norwich City on a loan deal that would run until the end of December. He sustained a calf injury in Norwich's pre-season friendly with Dutch side FC Zwolle on 25 July 2007, an injury that ruled him out of action for almost three months. Smith finally made his competitive debut for Norwich on 23 October 2007, coming on as a late substitute in a 2–1 defeat to Burnley at Turf Moor. He made nine appearances during a loan spell that was disrupted by injury, with his final appearance coming in a 1–1 home draw with Wolverhampton Wanderers on 29 December 2007. After the game against Wolves, Norwich manager Glenn Roeder confirmed he had been in talks with Chelsea's sporting director, Frank Arnesen, with a view to extending Smith's time there until the end of the season. However, the two clubs failed to reach an agreement for the extension of Smith's loan contract with Chelsea needing back-up in midfield due a number of their players competing in the Africa Cup of Nations, and he returned to Chelsea on 4 January 2008. He spent the remainder of the campaign playing regularly for Chelsea's second-string.

In June 2008, it was reported that Championship side Sheffield Wednesday were interested in acquiring Smith on loan for the first half of the 2008–09 campaign. It was later announced, on 1 July 2008, that the midfielder had joined Sheffield Wednesday on a loan deal until 10 January 2009. He made his debut for the club on the opening day of the season, replacing Jermaine Johnson with twenty minutes remaining in a comfortable 4–1 win over Burnley at Hillsborough. Smith started his first match three days later, on 12 August 2008, in the club's 2–2 draw with Rotherham United in the League Cup. Smith made infrequent appearances in his first three months with Wednesday, starting just four games up during his loan spell, as well as making a further nine appearances from the substitute's bench. This was not helped by the first red card of his career in a 3–1 away defeat to Birmingham City, receiving a four-match ban "for leading with his elbow in a challenge on Stuart Parnaby". After serving the suspension, Smith was unable to hold down a place in the Sheffield Wednesday first-team, returning to Chelsea upon the expiry of his loan deal in early January 2009.

=== Leyton Orient ===
Smith was loaned out once again in February 2009, this time joining League One side Leyton Orient for the remainder of the 2008–09 season. He was brought in by then-caretaker manager Kevin Nugent, who said – "Jimmy is joining from Chelsea and he will be a good addition to the squad. He has great ability and can play anywhere across the midfield". Smith made his debut for the club five days after joining, on 7 February, playing the whole match in the club's 0–0 away draw at Tranmere Rovers. He played regularly throughout the rest of the season, scoring his first goal for the club in a 2–1 victory over Colchester United at Brisbane Road in April 2009, a late winner that ensured Orient had all but secured their League One status for another season. Smith made 16 appearances during the successful loan spell, scoring once, as the club went from inside the relegation zone to finishing comfortably in mid-table during his three-month stay. He returned to Chelsea at the end of the season with a year remaining on his contract, but opted to leave the club to sign for Leyton Orient on a permanent basis, signing a two-year deal with the East London club. On the move, Smith stated – "The best thing about Orient is I know where I'm going to be from one week to the next. It's the reason I left Chelsea even though I had a year left on my contract". The 2009–10 campaign began with Smith scoring the winning goal on the opening day of the season, lifting the ball over Fraser Forster with just twenty minutes remaining to earn Orient a 2–1 victory away at Bristol Rovers. He was almost ever-present during the season, making 44 appearances in all competitions and scoring two goals, as the club narrowly avoided relegation to League Two by a point. His other goal during the season came in the club's 3–1 home win over Gillingham on 1 December 2009, a curling shot that doubled Orient's advantage just after half-time.

It took Smith three months to open his goalscoring account for the 2010–11 season, when he scored a late equaliser in a 2–2 draw against Peterborough United in November 2010. The goal was to spark a fine run of form for Smith into the new year, scoring in victories over Colchester United and Norwich City within the first week of 2011 – the latter goal a first-half header that ensured Orient progressed to the Fourth Round of the FA Cup courtesy of a 1–0 win at Carrow Road. Later that month, Smith scored another decisive goal in the FA Cup, this time as Orient disposed of Swansea City at the Liberty Stadium after securing a 2–1 victory. The win set up a Fifth Round tie at home to Premier League side Arsenal, with Smith playing the whole game as Orient took the North London club to a replay following a 1–1 draw. As well as his important goals in the FA Cup, Smith also scored four times within the space of a month between February and March 2011. The first of these goals came courtesy of a "powerful header" in a 4–1 home win over Bristol Rovers on 12 February, before scoring twice three days in a 3–2 victory over Milton Keynes Dons at Stadium mk. His eighth of the season came in Orient's 2–2 draw with promotion-chasing Huddersfield Town on 29 February, as Smith's low long-range strike restored parity late-on despite Orient only having ten men. Smith's form during the month resulted in him being nominated for League One Player of the Month for February. He added one further goal to his tally that season, volleying in Dean Cox's cross to score the only goal of the game as Orient won 1–0 away at Hartlepool United in March 2011. The victory meant Orient had gone a club-record fourteen league games without defeat. Smith scored nine times in 42 appearances during the season, as Orient missed out on the final play-off place by a point. He signed a new two-year contract extension at the end of the season, keeping him tied to the club until the summer of 2013.

He started in the club's first game of the 2011–12 season, a 1–0 loss to Walsall at the Bescot Stadium. Smith netted his first goal of the campaign on 27 August 2011, heading in Dean Cox's centre to give Orient a brief lead in a match they ultimately lost 2–1 at home to Carlisle United, meaning the club had opened the season with five straight defeats. He doubled his tally for the season a month later in a 1–1 draw with Colchester United, when he "tapped in" from close range in injury-time to help Orient earn only their second point from their opening seven league matches. He went on to score in comfortable victories over Rochdale and Bromley to end the year in positive fashion as Orient began to climb the League One standings. Smith scored in consecutive away wins in the opening months of 2012; firstly netting from close range in a 2–0 win against Preston North End, before denting AFC Bournemouth's play-off hopes with a back post header in a 2–1 Orient triumph. His seventh and final goal of the season came in a 2–0 home win over local rivals Brentford on 17 March 2012, collecting Ben Chorley's flick-on before finishing calmly to double Orient's advantage in the match. Smith was once again a regular first-team fixture throughout the season, making 43 appearances, with Orient finishing the season just one place above the relegation places.

He remained at Orient for the 2012–13 season, in what turned out to be his fourth full season with the East Londoners. Although Smith made 44 appearances during the campaign, 18 of which were as a substitute, unlike in previous seasons where he nearly always featured as a starter. After scoring his first goal of the season in a convincing 4–1 home win over Yeovil Town on 18 September 2012, Smith waited seven months to find the scoresheet again, ending the goal drought by firing in Mathieu Baudry's knock-down in a 2–0 win against Bury on 1 April 2013. He ended the season by scoring his third goal of the campaign with a first-time lob over the advancing Dean Bouzanis in an eventual 1–1 draw with Oldham Athletic at Brisbane Road on 27 April 2013. It turned out to be his last game for the club, as he was released by Orient just three days later on 30 April. During his four-year tenure at Orient, Smith made 189 appearances and scored 22 times in all competitions.

=== Stevenage ===
Following his release from Leyton Orient, Smith joined fellow League One side Stevenage on a free transfer on 10 June 2013. He endured a frustrating pre-season campaign, suffering a number of niggling injuries that kept him out for the opening weeks of the 2013–14 season. Smith made his first-team debut on 17 August, starting against his former employers, Leyton Orient, and playing the first 73 minutes in a 1–0 home defeat.

He made 47 appearances in all competitions in his first season and scored three goals, as his team finished bottom of the league.

=== Crawley Town ===
Following Stevenage's relegation, Smith joined League One side Crawley Town for an undisclosed fee. He scored his first professional hattrick on 14 February 2017 against Colchester in a 3–2 win. On 1 September 2018, Smith suffered a knee injury against Oldham Athletic which ruled him out for the majority of the remainder of the season. He returned from his injury as a substitute in the last game of the 2018–19 season against Tranmere Rovers.

On 9 September 2019, Smith joined National League side Yeovil Town on loan until January 2020. On 9 January 2020, Smith's loan was extended until the end of the 2019–20 season. He was released by Crawley at the end of the 2019–20 season.

=== Yeovil Town ===
Following his release from Crawley Town, Smith rejoined National League side Yeovil Town on a permanent deal. In May 2021, Smith announced his retirement from professional football to coincide with the end of the 2020–21 season.

=== Non-League career ===
Smith went on to play for Grays Athletic, signing for them in December 2021. He left Grays Athletic on 13 May 2022, playing his last game a month earlier against Brentwood Town.

== International career ==
Smith has represented England at U16, U17 and U19 level.

== Personal life ==
Smith was born in Newham, London. He grew up supporting West Ham United and Leyton Orient.

== Career statistics ==
As of match played 29 May 2021

Appearances and goals by club, season and competition
Club	Season	League			FA Cup		League Cup		Other		Total	
Club	Season	Division	Apps	Goals	Apps	Goals	Apps	Goals	Apps	Goals	Apps	Goals
Chelsea	2005–06	Premier League	1	0	0	0	0	0	0	0	1	0
Chelsea	2006–07	Premier League	0	0	—		0	0	0	0	0	0
Chelsea	2007–08	Premier League	0	0	0	0	0	0	0	0	0	0
Chelsea	2008–09	Premier League	0	0	0	0	—		0	0	0	0
Chelsea	Total		1	0	0	0	0	0	0	0	1	0
Queens Park Rangers (loan)	2006–07	Championship	29	6	2	0	—		—		31	6
Norwich City (loan)	2007–08	Championship	9	0	—		—		—		9	0
Sheffield Wednesday (loan)	2008–09	Championship	12	0	—		1	0	—		13	0
Leyton Orient (loan)	2008–09	League One	16	1	—		—		—		16	1
Leyton Orient	2009–10	League One	40	2	1	0	2	0	1 (Note: Appearance(s) in Football League Trophy)	0	44	2
Leyton Orient	2010–11	League One	31	7	7	2	2	0	2	0	42	9
Leyton Orient	2011–12	League One	38	6	1	1	3	0	1	0	43	7
Leyton Orient	2012–13	League One	35	3	4	0	2	0	3	0	44	3
Leyton Orient	Total		160	19	13	3	9	0	7	0	189	22
Stevenage	2013–14	League One	42	3	3	0	1	0	3	0	49	3
Crawley Town	2014–15	League One	36	1	1	0	2	0	3	0	42	1
Crawley Town	2015–16	League Two	31	1	1	0	1	0	1	0	34	1
Crawley Town	2016–17	League Two	46	7	2	0	1	0	1 (Note: Appearances in EFL Trophy)	0	50	7
Crawley Town	2017–18	League Two	37	10	1	0	0	0	1	0	39	10
Crawley Town	2018–19	League Two	4	1	0	0	0	0	0	0	4	1
Crawley Town	2019–20	League Two	0	0	0	0	0	0	0	0	0	0
Crawley Town	Total		154	20	5	0	4	0	6	0	169	20
Yeovil Town (loan)	2019–20	National League	20	5	1	0	—		2 (Note: One appearance in FA Trophy, one appearance in National League play-offs)	0	23	5
Yeovil Town	2020–21	National League	26	2	3	0	—		0	0	29	2
Yeovil Town	Total		46	7	4	0	—		2	0	52	7
Career total			453	55	27	3	15	0	18	0	513	58
