= Afolabi Obafemi =

English footballer

Personal information
- Full name: Afolabi Adedoyin Olamilekan Oluwatimilehin Obafemi
- Date of birth: 25 November 1994 (age 31)
- Place of birth: Walthamstow, London, England
- Height: 6 ft 2 in (1.88 m)
- Position: Forward

Youth career
- –2008: Ryan
- 2008–2011: Watford
- 2011–2013: Leyton Orient

Senior career*
Years	Team	Apps	(Gls)
2012–2013	Leyton Orient	9	(0)
2011	→ Scarborough Athletic (loan)	1	(0)
2012	→ AFC Sudbury (loan)	2	(0)
2012	→ Bishop's Stortford (loan)	1	(1)
2013–2014	Dagenham & Redbridge	22	(2)
2014	Welling United	5	(0)
2014	Hayes & Yeading United	3	(0)
2014–2015	Billericay Town		
2015–2016	Welling United	12	(2)
2015–2016	→ Bedford Town (loan)	8	(2)
2016	Staines Town	4	(0)
2016–2018	Wingate & Finchley	51	(10)
2018	Barking	4	(1)
- * Club domestic league appearances and goals as of 14:05, 3 September 2018 (UTC)

Afolabi Adedoyin Olamilekan Oluwatimilehin Obafemi (born 24 November 1994) is an English professional footballer who last played as a forward for Barking, having previously played in the Football League with Leyton Orient and Dagenham & Redbridge.

== Career ==
=== Early career ===
Born in Walthamstow, London, Obafemi's first football club as a youngster was Ryan F.C. During his spell at Ryan, Obafemi netted a record 48 goals in one season. During that season, he netted 48 times for the Sunday team, and 42 times whilst playing for the Saturday team. Obafemi spent a total of five years at Ryan F.C. before being scouted by Watford F.C.

Obafemi began his academy career with Watford's youth academy before switching to Leyton Orient. He was also a talented sprinter, winning the 100 metres final at the London Youth Games in 2009, in a time of 11.6 seconds.

=== Leyton Orient ===
In his first season in Orient's youth team, Obafemi was top scorer with 18 goals. In December 2011, he went on a work experience loan to Scarborough Athletic, playing in the 2–1 defeat at Barton Town Old Boys on 10 December.

On 30 March 2012, he signed for A.F.C. Sudbury, again on work experience, making his debut as a late substitute in the 1–0 win over Harlow Town on 7 April.

Obafemi made his full Orient debut on 5 May as a substitute in the 2–1 home win against Rochdale, the last game of the season.

In August 2012, Obafemi went on loan to Conference South club Bishop's Stortford, and scored in his only game in the 1–0 win over Boston United, before being recalled by the Os.

Obafemi was released by Orient on 24 April 2013.

=== Dagenham & Redbridge ===
Dagenham & Redbridge announced the free transfer signing of Obafemi on 11 July 2013. He signed a one-year deal with the club. In June 2014, after not being offered a new deal, he returned to the club for pre-season training to try and impress and earn a new contract. However, during July he was released.

=== Hayes & Yeading ===
In September 2014, he joined Hayes & Yeading United having been with Welling United, Maidstone United and Dulwich Hamlet on trial, and made his debut as a substitute in the 1–1 draw at Hemel Hempstead Town on 20 September. After making only three substitute appearances he moved to Billericay Town the following month, and stayed until the end of the season.

Obafemi signed for Welling United before the start of the 2014–15 season, and made his debut as a substitute in the 1–0 home win over Guiseley on 8 August. He scored his first goal for the club in the 2–1 home defeat by Braintree Town on 29 August.

In December 2015, he joined Bedford Town on loan, and he scored on his debut in the 2–1 defeat at home to AFC Rushden & Diamonds on 26 December.

== Personal life ==
His younger brother Michael Obafemi is also a footballer.

== Career statistics ==
As of match played 1 September 2018

Appearances and goals by club, season and competition
Club	Season	League			FA Cup		League Cup		Other		Total	
Club	Season	Division	Apps	Goals	Apps	Goals	Apps	Goals	Apps	Goals	Apps	Goals
Leyton Orient	2011–12	League One	1	0	0	0	0	0	0	0	1	0
Leyton Orient	2012–13	League One	8	0	0	0	0	0	2 (Note: Appearance(s) in Football League Trophy)	0	10	0
Leyton Orient	Total		9	0	0	0	0	0	2	0	11	0
Scarborough Athletic (loan)	2011–12	NCE Premier Division	1	0	—		—		—		1	0
AFC Sudbury (loan)	2011–12	IL Division One North	2	0	—		—		—		2	0
Bishop's Stortford (loan)	2012–13	Conference North	1	1	—		—		—		1	1
Dagenham & Redbridge	2013–14	League Two	22	2	1	0	1	0	3	1	27	3
Welling United	2014–15	Conference Premier	5	0	—		—		—		5	0
Hayes & Yeading United	2014–15	Conference South	3	0	1	0	—		—		4	0
Welling United	2015–16	National League	12	2	2	0	—		0	0	14	2
Bedford Town (loan)	2015–16	SL Division One Central	8	2	—		—		—		8	2
Staines Town	2016–17	IL Premier Division	4	0	0	0	—		0	0	4	0
Wingate & Finchley	2016–17	IL Premier Division	10	2	0	0	—		1 (Note: Appearance(s) in Isthmian League Premier Division Play-offs)	0	11	2
Wingate & Finchley	2017–18	IL Premier Division	39	8	4	0	—		5 (Note: Three appearances in Alan Turvey Trophy, two in FA Trophy)	0	48	8
Wingate & Finchley	2018–19	IL Premier Division	2	0	0	0	—		0	0	2	0
Wingate & Finchley	Total		51	10	4	0	—		6	0	61	10
Barking	2018–19	IL North Division	4	1	0	0	—		1 (Note: Appearance in the Alan Turvey Trophy)	0	5	1
Career totals			122	18	8	0	1	0	12	1	143	19
