= Ben Chorley =

English footballer (born 1982)

Personal information
- Full name: Benjamin Francis Joseph Chorley
- Date of birth: 30 September 1982 (age 44)
- Place of birth: Sidcup, England
- Height: 6 ft 3 in (1.91 m)
- Position: Defender

Youth career
- 1998–2001: Arsenal

Senior career*
Years	Team	Apps	(Gls)
2001–2003	Arsenal	0	(0)
2002	→ Brentford (loan)	2	(0)
2003–2004	Wimbledon	45	(2)
2004–2007	Milton Keynes Dons	80	(3)
2006–2007	→ Gillingham (loan)	27	(1)
2007–2009	Tranmere Rovers	76	(2)
2009–2013	Leyton Orient	131	(7)
2013–2014	Stevenage	12	(0)
2014–2015	Portsmouth	28	(0)
2015–2018	Bromley	80	(0)
Total		481	(15)
- * Club domestic league appearances and goals

Benjamin Francis Joseph Chorley (born 30 September 1982) is an English former professional footballer who played as a defender.

Chorley started his career at Arsenal, spending several years at the club on youth terms before signing a professional deal in 2001. He spent two months on loan at Brentford at the start of the 2002–03 season. Having made no first-team appearances for Arsenal, Chorley opted to leave the club and sign for Wimbledon in 2003. He continued playing under the club's new guise in Milton Keynes for a further three years from 2004 to 2007. During his final year at MK Dons, Chorley spent the majority of the 2006–07 season on loan at Gillingham. He left MK Dons in July 2007, and signed a two-year contract with Tranmere Rovers. After two years of regular football at Tranmere, Chorley returned to London, signing for Leyton Orient in June 2009. He made over 150 appearances during his three-and-a-half-year spell at Orient, before signing for Stevenage in January 2013 for an undisclosed fee. Chorley's contract was cancelled by mutual consent in January 2014 and he subsequently signed for Portsmouth. After two seasons at Portsmouth, he joined National League side Bromley at the start of the 2015–16 season.

== Career ==
Chorley began his career at Arsenal as a trainee in 1998, progressing through the club's youth system and playing regularly for the U18 and reserve sides. He was part of the team that won the FA Youth Cup in successive seasons, in 2000 and 2001 respectively, captaining the side throughout the latter tournament. Chorley signed his first professional contract in 2001, signing a two-year deal with Arsenal. He was subsequently loaned out to Brentford at the start of the 2002–03 season to gain match experience and made three appearances in all competitions during the two-month loan agreement. Chorley's first appearance in professional football was in Brentford's 3–3 draw away at AFC Bournemouth in the League Cup in September 2002, playing the first 45 minutes of the match. He returned to Arsenal, and a year into his contract, Chorley sensed that there was "little prospect" of first-team selection, and subsequently requested a move away from the North London side. With eight months remaining on his deal, having not made a first-team appearance for Arsenal, he left the club and opted to sign for Wimbledon.

=== Wimbledon and MK Dons ===
Chorley made his first-team debut for Wimbledon immediately after signing for the club, playing the whole match in a 2–0 victory over Millwall at Selhurst Park on 15 March 2003. He went on to make ten appearances during the latter stages of the 2002–03 season. The following campaign was Chorley's breakthrough year in first-team football, playing regularly for Wimbledon in what was ultimately their last season before the club relocated to Milton Keynes. Chorley scored his first goal in professional football in April 2004, netting the only goal of the game as Wimbledon beat eventual champions Wigan Athletic at the JJB Stadium. A week after scoring his first ever goal, he doubled his goal tally, netting in a 3–3 home draw with Preston North End. Chorley was part of the starting line-up for Wimbledon's 1–0 victory over Derby County, the club's last ever league match as Wimbledon. He made 38 appearances during the campaign, a season in which Wimbledon were relegated to League One after finishing bottom of the league table.

Chorley opted to play for the club under their new guise, Milton Keynes Dons, following the club's relocation from Wimbledon to Milton Keynes. He admitted the decision was difficult, due to Wimbledon being very local for him, whilst he had to travel "quite far" to Milton Keynes. Chorley was made club captain during the season. He made his first appearance of the 2004–05 campaign in a 3–1 home loss to Bournemouth on 21 August 2004. He scored two goals within the space of three days in October 2004; firstly scoring a header in a 3–2 defeat to Hull City, before netting a late consolation goal from the penalty spot as MK Dons were defeated 3–1 at Huddersfield Town. The two goals turned out to be Chorley's only goals of the season, as he went on to make 47 appearances for the club in all competitions. This included an appearance on the final day of the season; a 2–1 home win over Tranmere Rovers ultimately meant MK Dons survived relegation to League Two, with Torquay United suffering relegation instead on goal difference. A month after securing League One status for another season, in June 2005, Chorley signed a new two-year with the club. MK Dons manager Danny Wilson stated – "He is a tremendous captain and solid centre-half – you look for strong characters to lead the team and there are none stronger than Ben. I'm really pleased he is staying". The first half of Chorley's 2005–06 season was disrupted by suspensions and injuries, receiving two red cards, as well as suffering a recurring thigh injury. Chorley featured regularly during the latter stages of the campaign, making 29 appearances, but could not prevent the club from being relegated to League Two as a result of a 22nd-place finish.

Having featured regularly for MK Dons during the opening months of the following campaign, Chorley was one of six players that had been transfer-listed by new manager Martin Allen at MK Dons, in order for Allen to "make room for new signings". Chorley stated that he was "stunned" to be transfer-listed – "I felt I was quite an important member of the team. I feel I did well and always gave 100%. I was surprised but things change and I wasn't going to play". Just three days after being transfer-listed, Chorley joined League One side Gillingham on a three-month loan deal. After being deemed fit to play, he made his debut for Gillingham as a second-half substitute for Andrew Crofts in a 2–0 home win over Carlisle United two days after joining the club. His first goal for the club ultimately turned out to be the winner as Gillingham came from two goals down to secure a 3–2 away win over Tranmere Rovers in December 2006. A month later, Chorley signed a loan extension with the Kent club, meaning he would remain at the club for the remainder of the 2006–07 season. He made 27 appearances, of which 24 were starting, as Gillingham finished the season in 16th place. At the end of the campaign, on 8 May 2007, Gillingham stated that Chorley's loan agreement with the club had ended, and that he would return to his parent club. On his return to MK Dons, his contract was terminated by mutual consent, and the player was able to look for a new club on a free transfer. During Chorley's three-year association with Milton Keynes Dons, he made 91 appearances and scored three goals.

=== Tranmere Rovers ===
In July 2007, Chorley signed for Tranmere Rovers of League One, joining on a two-year contract. He made his debut for the club on the opening day of the 2007–08 season, as Tranmere lost 2–1 at home to Leeds United at a packed Prenton Park. Chorley scored his first goal for the club in a 2–1 away win at Southend United in October 2007, volleying home Paul McLaren's corner to give Tranmere the lead – the win stretched the club's unbeaten run to nine games. It was to be his only goal of the campaign, making 36 appearances in a season where he was in and out of the first-team due to facing tough competition from fellow central defender Antony Kay. His second year at Tranmere saw Chorley become an integral part of the side, playing in 45 of the 46 league matches, as well as making a further eight appearances in cup competitions. During the season, Chorley doubled his goal tally for the club, scoring in a 2–1 loss to Hartlepool United at Victoria Park in March 2009. Tranmere narrowly missed out on the final play-off position after drawing 1–1 with Scunthorpe United on the last day of the season, with Scunthorpe subsequently holding onto sixth place after scoring an equaliser with two minutes remaining. It was to be Chorley's last game for the club. He made 89 appearances during his two-year spell with the Merseyside club.

=== Leyton Orient ===
Chorley left Tranmere when his contract expired at the end of the 2008–09 season, rejecting the club's offer of a contract extension. He subsequently signed for League One side Leyton Orient on a two-year deal in June 2009. Leyton Orient chief executive Matt Porter revealed that eight clubs had tried to sign Chorley after it was announced he would become a free agent. He made his debut for Orient in the club's first game of the new season, playing the whole match in a 2–1 away victory at Bristol Rovers on 8 August 2009. Chorley was almost ever present during his first season with the club, making 47 appearances in all competitions, and scoring once in a 2–1 away loss at Millwall in April 2010. He remained a regular feature in Orient's defence during the 2010–11 season, and was made club captain during the campaign. Chorley hit a rich vein of goalscoring form midway through the season, scoring twice in two games against Rochdale, as well as in convincing home victories over Droylsden and Sheffield Wednesday respectively. The season also marked the opportunity for Chorley to face the team he grew up playing for, Arsenal, as Orient held the Premier League side to a draw in the FA Cup fifth round at Brisbane Road, before eventually losing in the replay at the Emirates Stadium. He made 41 appearances during the season, scoring four times, as an injury sustained in March 2011 limited his first-team appearances for the remainder of the campaign. At the end of the season, Chorley signed a new two-year contract with the club, on a deal that would run until the summer of 2013.

He started in the club's first game of the 2011–12 season, a 1–0 defeat to Walsall at the Bescot Stadium. It took Chorley just seven games to score his first goal of the new season, scoring a penalty in a 3–2 home win over Bristol Rovers in the League Cup. He also scored a 90th-minute equaliser in a 2–2 draw away to Huddersfield Town on 24 September 2011, netting from close range in a match that Orient had trailed by two goals. Shortly after the club's next match, Chorley suffered an injury that ruled him out for two months. He returned to the first-team in December 2011, but a red card in a 1–0 win over Stevenage would mean he missed another three matches. During the campaign, he played in 37 games and scored twice, in a season that witnessed Leyton Orient narrowly avoid relegation, finishing just above the four relegation places. Chorley was again a permanent fixture during the first half of Leyton Orient's 2012–13 season, making 34 appearances and spending most of the season as club captain as a result of Nathan Clarke's absence. He scored twice for Orient during the season, with his goals coming in 4–1 victories over Yeovil Town and Carlisle United respectively. With his contract set to expire at the end of the season, and reported interest from other League One sides, Chorley spoke with Leyton Orient manager Russell Slade about a move away from Brisbane Road, citing a need for a longer contract. During his three-and-a-half-year tenure with the club, he made 159 appearances in all competitions and scored nine goals.

=== Stevenage ===
In January 2013, Chorley signed for Stevenage for an undisclosed fee, on a two-and-a-half-year contract. The move reunited Chorley with Stevenage manager Gary Smith, who had coached the player during his time at Wimbledon. He made his debut two days after signing, against his former club Leyton Orient, playing the whole match in a 1–0 defeat. In March 2013, having made eight appearances for Stevenage, Chorley underwent a double hernia operation that would ultimately rule him out for the remainder of the 2012–13 season.

=== Portsmouth ===
On 20 January 2014, Chorley joined Portsmouth on an 18-month contract. On 17 July 2014, he was named as Team Captain for the 14/15 season, with Johnny Ertl continuing as Club Captain. On 18 May 2015, Portsmouth announced that they would be releasing Chorley when his contract expired in June.

== Non-playing career ==
In July 2021, Chorley was appointed director of football at Swindon Town. Chorley resigned from his role on 30 May 2022.

In June 2023, Chorley was appointed Director of Football at Ligue 2 club Valenciennes FC who are owned by Sport Republic. He joined English club Southampton, also owned by Sport Republic, in August 2025 before leaving both Southampton and Sport Republic at the end of the 2025–26 season.

== Career statistics ==
As of match played 20 May 2018

Appearances and goals by club, season and competition
Club	Season	League			FA Cup		League Cup		Other		Total	
Club	Season	Division	Apps	Goals	Apps	Goals	Apps	Goals	Apps	Goals	Apps	Goals
Arsenal	2001–02	Premier League	0	0	0	0	0	0	0	0	0	0
Arsenal	2002–03	Premier League	0	0	0	0	0	0	0	0	0	0
Arsenal	Total		0	0	0	0	0	0	0	0	0	0
Brentford (loan)	2002–03	Second Division	2	0	0	0	1	0	0	0	3	0
Wimbledon	2002–03	First Division	10	0	0	0	0	0	0	0	10	0
Wimbledon	2003–04	First Division	35	2	2	0	1	0	0	0	38	2
Wimbledon	Total		45	2	2	0	1	0	0	0	48	2
Milton Keynes Dons	2004–05	League One	41	2	2	0	2	0	2 (Note: Appearances in the Football League Trophy)	0	47	2
Milton Keynes Dons	2005–06	League One	26	0	2	0	1	0	0	0	29	0
Milton Keynes Dons	2006–07	League Two	13	1	0	0	2	0	0	0	15	1
Milton Keynes Dons	Total		80	3	4	0	5	0	2	0	91	3
Gillingham (loan)	2006–07	League One	27	1	0	0	0	0	0	0	27	1
Tranmere Rovers	2007–08	League One	31	1	3	0	1	0	1	0	36	1
Tranmere Rovers	2008–09	League One	45	1	4	0	1	0	3	0	53	1
Tranmere Rovers	Total		76	2	7	0	2	0	4	0	89	2
Leyton Orient	2009–10	League One	42	1	2	0	2	0	1	0	47	1
Leyton Orient	2010–11	League One	29	3	8	1	2	0	2	0	41	4
Leyton Orient	2011–12	League One	32	1	1	0	3	1	1	0	37	2
Leyton Orient	2012–13	League One	28	2	3	0	2	0	1	0	34	2
Leyton Orient	Total		131	7	14	1	9	1	5	0	159	9
Stevenage	2012–13	League One	8	0	0	0	0	0	0	0	8	0
Stevenage	2013–14	League One	4	0	1	0	0	0	1	0	6	0
Stevenage	Total		12	0	1	0	0	0	1	0	14	0
Portsmouth	2013–14	League Two	12	0	0	0	0	0	0	0	12	0
Portsmouth	2014–15	League Two	16	0	2	0	1	0	0	0	19	0
Portsmouth	Total		28	0	1	0	1	0	0	0	31	0
Bromley	2015–16	National League	31	0	1	0	—		1 (Note: Appearances in the FA Trophy)	0	33	0
Bromley	2016–17	National League	26	0	0	0	—		0	0	26	0
Bromley	2017–18	National League	23	0	0	0	—		5	0	28	0
Bromley	Total		80	0	1	0	—		6	0	87	0
Career totals			481	15	31	1	19	1	18	0	549	17

== Honours ==
Arsenal

- FA Youth Cup: 1999–2000, 2000–01

Bromley

- FA Trophy runner-up: 2017–18

Individual

- Milton Keynes Dons Player of the Year: 2004–05
