= Jonathan Téhoué =

French footballer (born 1984)

Personal information
- Full name: Jonathan Kahne Téhoué
- Date of birth: 3 May 1984 (age 42)
- Place of birth: Paris, France
- Height: 1.83 m (6 ft 0 in)
- Position: Striker

Youth career
- Bastia

Senior career*
Years	Team	Apps	(Gls)
2000–2002	Caen	1	(0)
2003–2004	Bastia	7	(0)
2005	APOEL	0	(0)
2006	Virton	13	(4)
2006–2007	FC Brussels	19	(5)
2007–2008	Kasımpaşa	15	(6)
2008–2009	Konyaspor	23	(3)
2009–2010	UJA Alfortville	2	(1)
2010–2012	Leyton Orient	62	(12)
2012	→ Swindon Town (loan)	3	(0)
2012–2013	Boulogne	25	(10)
2013–2014	Amiens	14	(1)
2014–2015	Boulogne	9	(1)
Total		193	(43)
- * Club domestic league appearances and goals

Jonathan Kahne Téhoué (born 3 May 1984) is a French former professional footballer who played as a striker.

He is known as a super-sub amongst Leyton Orient fans, having scored nine goals after the 85th minute of various matches since he joined the club.

== Club career ==
Téhoué was born in Paris. He previously played for SC Bastia in France, APOEL in Cyprus, R.E. Virton and FC Brussels in Belgium. He transferred to Kasımpaşa S.K. in August 2007 and moved to Konyaspor in February 2008.

=== Huddersfield Town ===
After a successful trial, English Football League One club Huddersfield Town signed him subject to international clearance on 2 February 2009, but, because of a contractual dispute between Téhoué and Konyaspor, this was not forthcoming. FIFA became involved, but no decision was reached in time for the deal to be completed in the 2008–09 season.

=== Leyton Orient ===
Upon leaving Konyaspor, Téhoué had a short spell with French side UJA Alfortville. On 12 January 2010, he was signed by League One club Leyton Orient on a short-term contract until the end of the 2009–10 season after impressing on a trial with the club.

On 2 February 2010, Téhoué scored his first goal in English football, converting Sean Thornton's cross from close range to score the fifth in Orient's 5–0 win over Bristol Rovers. On 12 March 2010, he signed a 2 1/2-year deal with the club which would keep him at The O's until 2012.

Téhoué scored his first goal of the 2010–11 season against Hartlepool United on 16 October 2010, smashing home from six yards in the 89th minute to earn the O's a 1–0 victory.

On 7 December 2010, Téhoué scored a late equaliser in the FA Cup Second Round against Droylsden and went on to complete a hat-trick in extra-time. His teammate Scott McGleish also achieved a hat-trick in extra-time, ultimately guiding Orient to an 8–2 victory and a place in the third round. On 20 February 2011, Téhoué came off the bench to score the late equaliser in Orient's fifth round 1–1 draw against Arsenal to earn Leyton Orient a replay at the Emirates Stadium.

After four months out with a broken wrist, Tehoue made his comeback with two goals in his first two games, coming on as a substitute to score in the 74th minute to round off a 3-0 win against Exeter before netting Orient's second against Notts County in the 85th minute (again as a sub).

=== Swindon Town ===
On 7 March 2012, Téhoué went on loan to Swindon Town until the end of the season, stating that he did not get on well with Orient manager Russell Slade, and that he hoped to stay at Swindon and score against Orient in League One the following season. However, after one start and two substitute appearances for the Robins, manager Paolo Di Canio said that Téhoué would not play for the club again, claiming, "He's not as good as I thought he was."
