= Billy Lobjoit =

English footballer

Personal information
- Date of birth: 3 September 1993 (age 33)
- Place of birth: Edgware, London
- Height: 5 ft 9 in (1.75 m)
- Position: Forward

Team information
- Current team: Bishop's Stortford

Youth career
- 2004–2008: Doncaster Rovers
- 2008–2012: Leyton Orient

Senior career*
Years	Team	Apps	(Gls)
2011–2013	Leyton Orient	1	(0)
2012	→ Boreham Wood (loan)	6	(2)
2013	Bishop's Stortford	8	(3)
2013	Hendon	6	(0)
2013–2014	Boreham Wood	10	(0)
2014	→ Billericay Town (loan)		
2014–2015	Gainsborough Trinity	9	(0)
2014–2015	→ Leighton Town (loan)	17	(1)
2015	Bishop's Stortford	2	(0)
2015	→ Brentwood Town (loan)		
2015–2017	New Bradwell St Peter	33	(21)
2017–2018	Potters Bar Town	9	(1)
2018–2020	Crawley Green	32	(14)
2020–2025	Belstone		
2025–	Codicote	2	(0)
- * Club domestic league appearances and goals as of 17:14, 24 August 2025 (UTC)

Billy Jay Lobjoit (born 3 September 1993 in Edgware, London) is an English professional footballer who plays for Codicote.

== Career ==
=== Leyton Orient ===
Lobjoit started his career in 2004 with a youth contract at Doncaster Rovers, and a scholarship contract from the 2005–06 season. For 2008–09, he moved to Leyton Orient and played in the U-18 team while aged 15. During 2010–11, scored 12 goals in 27 games, and was named as a first-team substitute in September 2011 when manager Russell Slade found his squad depleted with injuries. He made a total of seven appearances on the bench during the 2011–12 season.

In January 2012, Lobjoit signed for Boreham Wood on a work experience loan, and scored twice on his debut in a 3–0 win over Weston-super-Mare on 21 January.

On 30 April 2012, after scoring a total of 13 goals in 19 games for Orient's youth team in 2011–12, Lobjoit was given a year-long professional contract at Brisbane Road. He made his full Orient debut on 5 May as a substitute in the 2–1 home win against Rochdale, the last game of the season.

After being convicted of robbery, Lobjoit was released from his Leyton Orient contract on 4 March 2013.

=== Bishop's Stortford ===
On his release from Orient, Lobjoit signed for Bishop's Stortford, and made his debut as a substitute in the 3–1 defeat at home to Brackley Town in the Conference North on 30 March 2013. He scored his first goal for the club on 3 April, in the 2–1 home defeat to Gloucester City.

=== Hendon ===
Shortly afterwards in August 2013, Lobjoit signed for Isthmian League Premier side Hendon. He made his debut in the 3–2 defeat at Enfield Town, and made six appearances for the club before leaving in late September.

=== Boreham Wood ===
On 25 September 2013, it was revealed that Lobjoit had signed for Boreham Wood in the Conference South. He made his first appearance against Barton Rovers in the FA Cup Second Qualifying Round three days later; the game ended 0–0.

=== Gainsborough Trinity, return to Bishop's Stortford and later career ===
In August 2014 Lobjoit penned a deal with Conference North side Gainsborough Trinity. He returned to Bishop's Stortford shortly before the start of the 2015–16 season, and had a dual registration with Brentwood Town.

He later had spells with New Bradwell St Peter, Potters Bar Town, Crawley Green and Belstone.

== Personal life ==
In March 2013, Lobjoit pleaded guilty to two charges of robbery after using his distinctive white Smart Car to drive a friend away from two armed hold-ups. He received an 18-month prison sentence suspended for two years, a two-year driving ban, and was ordered to pay £1500 compensation. Lobjoit was also banned from licensed premises for six months on Friday and Saturday evenings.
