= 2004–05 AFC Bournemouth season =

Bournemouth
2004–05 season
- Manager: Sean O'Driscoll
- Ground: Dean Court
- League One: 8th
- FA Cup: Fourth Round
- Football League Cup: Third Round
- Football League Trophy: First round
- Top goalscorer: League: James Hayter (19); All: James Hayter (22)

The 2004–05 AFC Bournemouth season was the club's second consecutive season in Football League One. During the 2004–05 English football season, Bournemouth participated in League One, the LDV Vans Trophy, the FA Cup, and the Football League Cup. Bournemouth were eliminated from the FA Cup in the Fourth Round, the LDV Vans Trophy in the First Round and the League Cup in the Third Round.

== Season squad ==
Note: Flags indicate national team as defined under FIFA eligibility rules; some limited exceptions apply. Players may hold more than one non-FIFA nationality.

No.	Pos.	Nation	Player
1	GK	ENG	Neil Moss
2	DF	ENG	Neil Young
3	DF	ENG	Stephen Purches
4	MF	WAL	Marcus Browning
5	DF	ENG	Karl Broadhurst
6	DF	IRL	Shaun Maher
8	MF	WAL	Brian Stock
9	FW	POR	Dani Rodrigues
10	FW	ENG	Steve Fletcher
11	MF	ENG	Wade Elliott
12	MF	IRL	Garreth O'Connor
13	GK	ENG	Kevin Scriven
14	FW	ENG	James Hayter
15	MF	ENG	James Coutts
17	FW	ENG	Alan Connell

No.	Pos.	Nation	Player
18	DF	ENG	Jason Tindall
19	MF	ENG	James Rowe
20	DF	ENG	Eddie Howe
21	DF	ENG	Ryan Moss
22	DF	ENG	Matt Mills (on loan from Southampton)
24	GK	ENG	Gareth Stewart
24	FW	ENG	Michael Symes
25	MF	ENG	John Spicer
26	FW	Jersey	Brett Pitman
28	DF	SCO	Warren Cummings
30	MF	ENG	Jamie Whisken
31	DF	ENG	James O'Connor
33	DF	ENG	Adam Green (on loan from Fulham)
34	DF	USA	Frank Simek (on loan from Arsenal)

=== Left club during season ===
Note: Flags indicate national team as defined under FIFA eligibility rules; some limited exceptions apply. Players may hold more than one non-FIFA nationality.

No.	Pos.	Nation	Player
7	DF	WAL	Carl Fletcher (joined West Ham United on 1 September 2004)
22	DF	ENG	Martin Cranie (on loan from Southampton)
23	MF	POR	Diogo Andrade (released)
16	FW	SCO	Derek Holmes (joined Carlisle United on 23 February 2005)

== Competitions ==
=== Football League One ===
==== League table ====
Pos	Team	Pld	W	D	L	GF	GA	GD	Pts	Promotion or relegation
6	Hartlepool United	46	21	8	17	76	66	+10	71	Qualification for League One play-offs
7	Bristol City	46	18	16	12	74	57	+17	70	
8	Bournemouth	46	20	10	16	77	64	+13	70	
9	Huddersfield Town	46	20	10	16	74	65	+9	70	
10	Doncaster Rovers	46	16	18	12	65	60	+5	66	

Updated to match(es) played on May 2005. Source: Soccerbase
Rules for classification: 1) points; 2) goal difference; 3) number of goals scored.

=== Results ===
Game	Date	Opponent	Venue	Result	Attendance	Goalscorers
1	7 August 2004	Hull City	KC Stadium	0-1	17,569	
2	10 August 2004	Walsall	Dean Court	2-2	6,485	Hayter 72', Elliott 74'
3	14 August 2004	Bristol City	Dean Court	2-2	6,918	C. Fletcher 48', Hayter 88'
4	21 August 2004	MK Dons	National Hockey Stadium	3–1	3,230	Hayter 21' 76', C. Fletcher 90'
5	28 August 2004	Wrexham	Dean Court	1–0	5,774	Connell 28'
6	30 August 2004	Luton Town	Kenilworth Road	0-1	7,404	
7	4 September 2004	Brentford	Griffin Park	1-2	5,682	Holmes 50'
8	11 September 2004	Colchester United	Dean Court	1-3	5,944	Stockley (og) 74'
9	18 September 2004	Sheffield Wednesday	Hillsborough	1–0	19,203	John Spicer 41'
10	25 September 2004	Doncaster Rovers	Dean Court	5-0	6,588	Rodrigues 5' Hayter 5' 70', Howe 19', O'Connor 25'
11	2 October 2004	Blackpool	Bloomfield Road	3-3	5,525	Hayter 12', Rodrigues 28' 64'
12	8 October 2004	Stockport County	Dean Court	2-1	6,925	Stock 22' Hayter 45'
13	16 October 2004	Port Vale	Dean Court	4–0	6,119	John Spicer 9' Stock 39' 45' Cummings 46'
14	19 October 2004	Torquay United	Plainmoor	2–1	3,055	Fletcher 57' O'Connor 62'
15	23 October 2004	Oldham Athletic	Boundary Park	2-1	5,335	Hayter 59' 76'
16	30 October 2004	Barnsley	Dean Court	1–3	7,709	Elliott 52'
17	6 November 2004	Peterborough United	London Road Stadium	1-0	4,004	Hayter 4'
18	20 November 2004	Chesterfield	Dean Court	0–0	6,565	
19	27 November 2004	Hartlepool United	Victoria Park	2-3	4,376	Holmes 39' Stock 45'
20	7 December 2004	Bradford City	Dean Court	2–0	5,578	Broadhurst 12' Connell 18'
21	10 December 2004	Tranmere Rovers	Prenton Park	0-2	8,557	
22	18 December 2004	Swindon Town	Whaddon Road	2-1	7,110	O'Connor 51' Maher 77'
23	28 December 2004	Huddersfield Town	Dean Court	2–2	8,448	John Spicer 17' 51'
24	1 January 2005	Brentford	Dean Court	3–2	8,072	Fletcher 5' 35' 58'
25	3 January 2005	Doncaster Rovers	Belle Vue	1–1	6,016	John Spicer 44'
26	15 January 2005	Sheffield Wednesday	Dean Court	1–1	8,847	O'Connor 11'
27	22 January 2005	Huddersfield Town	Galpharm Stadium	2–3	9,754	Hayter 45' 62'
28	1 February 2005	Stockport County	Edgeley Park	2-2	3,850	John Spicer 6', O'Connor 83'
29	5 February 2005	Port Vale	Vale Park	1-2	4,186	O'Connor 13'
30	12 February 2005	Oldham Athletic	Dean Court	4-0	6,622	Fletcher 28', O'Connor 60' 90', Hayter 81'
31	15 February 2005	Colchester United	Layer Road	1-3	2,820	Cummings 47'
32	19 February 2005	Barnsley	Oakwell	1–0	8,153	O'Connor 77'
33	22 February 2005	Torquay United	Dean Court	3–0	5,887	Maher 29'O'Connor (pen) 48' Fletcher 84'
34	26 February 2005	Tranmere Rovers	Dean Court	1–1	7,305	Mills 43'
35	5 March 2005	Swindon Town	County Ground	3-0	8,275	Elliott 1' Hayter 56' Mills 74'
36	8 March 2005	Blackpool	Dean Court	2–3	5,390	Stock 7' Hayter (pen) 90'
37	12 March 2005	Walsall	Bescot Stadium	2-1	5,126	Fletcher 40' O'Connor 53'
38	19 March 2005	Hull City	Dean Court	0-4	8,895	
39	28 March 2005	MK Dons	Dean Court	0-1	7,064	
40	2 April 2005	Wrexham	Racecourse Ground	2-1	3,801	Purches 58' Elliott 67'
41	5 April 2005	Bristol City	Ashton Gate	2-0	3,040	O'Connor 60' (pen) '77
42	9 April 2005	Luton Town	Dean Court	0-1	9,058	
43	16 April 2005	Chesterfield	Saltergate	3-2	4,009	Fletcher 47' 90', Stock 63'
44	23 April 2005	Peterborough United	Dean Court	0-1	7,929	
45	30 April 2005	Bradford City	Valley Parade	2-4	10,263	Hayter 61' Mills 63'
46	7 May 2005	Hartlepool United	Dean Court	2–2	8,620	Hayter 12' 31'

=== League Cup ===
Round	Date	Opponent	Venue	Result	Attendance	Goalscorers	Other
1	24 August 2004	Leyton Orient	Brisbane Road	3-1	1,705	Browning 33' Cummings 64' Hayter 71'	
2	22 September 2004	Blackburn Rovers	Ewood Park	3-3	7,226	O'Connor 13' Broadhurst 82' Spicer 115'	Bournemouth won 7–6 on penalties
3	26 October 2004	Cardiff City	Dean Court	3-3	8,598	Hayter 8' 90' Stock 118'	Cardiff won 5–4 on penalties

=== FA Cup ===
Round	Date	Opponent	Venue	Result	Attendance	Goalscorers
1	13 November 2004	Forest Green Rovers	The Lawn Ground	1–1	1,837	Fletcher 24'
1R	24 November 2004	Forest Green Rovers	Dean Court	3-1	5,489	Connell 10' Spicer 70' Rodrigues 90'
2	4 December 2004	Carlisle United	Dean Court	2-1	5,815	Holmes 48'Connell 64'
3	8 January 2005	Chester City	Dean Court	2-1	7,653	Maher 53'Elliott 56'
4	29 January 2005	Burnley	Turf Moor	0-2	9,944	

=== Football League Trophy ===
Round	Date	Opponent	Venue	Result	Attendance	Goalscorers
1	24 September 2004	Shrewsbury Town	Gay Meadow	2–3	1,278	Stock 72', Whitehead (og) 90'
