= 2002–03 AFC Bournemouth season =

Bournemouth
2002–03 season
- Manager: Sean O'Driscoll
- Ground: Dean Court
- Third Division: 4th
- FA Cup: Fourth round
- Football League Cup: First round
- Football League Trophy: Southern Section Semi Final
- Top goalscorer: League: James Hayter/Garreth O'Connor (8); All: James Hayter

The 2002–03 AFC Bournemouth season was the club's first season in the English Third Division following relegation the previous year. During the 2002–03 English football season, Bournemouth participated in Division Three, the LDV Vans Trophy, the FA Cup, and the Football League Cup. Bournemouth finished 4th in Division Three and were subsequently promoted via the playoffs. They reached the Fourth Round of the FA Cup, and the Southern Section Semi Final of the LDV Vans Trophy, but were knocked of the League Cup at the first hurdle.

== Season squad ==
Note: Flags indicate national team as defined under FIFA eligibility rules; some limited exceptions apply. Players may hold more than one non-FIFA nationality.

No.	Pos.	Nation	Player
1	GK	ENG	Gareth Stewart
2	DF	ENG	Neil Young
3	DF	ENG	Stephen Purches
4	MF	WAL	Marcus Browning
5	FW	NIR	Warren Feeney
6	DF	IRL	Shaun Maher
7	DF	WAL	Carl Fletcher
8	MF	WAL	Brian Stock
9	FW	ENG	Chukki Eribenne
10	FW	ENG	Steve Fletcher
11	MF	ENG	Wade Elliott
12	MF	IRL	Garreth O'Connor
13	GK	Guernsey	Chris Tardif

No.	Pos.	Nation	Player
14	FW	ENG	James Hayter
15	DF	ENG	Narada Bernard
16	FW	SCO	Derek Holmes
17	FW	ENG	Alan Connell
18	DF	ENG	Jason Tindall
19	FW	AUS	Scott McDonald (on loan from Southampton)
20	DF	ENG	Phil Gulliver (on loan from Middlesbrough)
21	DF	ENG	Karl Broadhurst
22	MF	ENG	Danny Thomas
25	GK	ENG	Neil Moss
28	DF	SCO	Warren Cummings
30	DF	ENG	John Purches

=== Left club during season ===
Note: Flags indicate national team as defined under FIFA eligibility rules; some limited exceptions apply. Players may hold more than one non-FIFA nationality.

No.	Pos.	Nation	Player
13	GK	FRA	Mickaël Ménétrier (Released)
28	DF	ENG	Liam Ridgewell (on loan from Aston Villa)
19	FW	ENG	Danny Bloomfield (joined Cambridge City in November 2002)
24	GK	ENG	Jamie Ashdown (on loan from Reading)
25	GK	ENG	Alan Blayney (on loan from Southampton)
20	FW	ENG	Amos Foyewa (joined Woking on 20 March 2003)
26	DF	ENG	Lewis Buxton (on loan from Portsmouth)

== Final league table ==
Pos	Team	Pld	W	D	L	GF	GA	GD	Pts	Promotion or relegation
2	Hartlepool United (P)	46	24	13	9	71	51	+20	85	Promotion to Football League Second Division
3	Wrexham (P)	46	23	15	8	84	50	+34	84	Promotion to Football League Second Division
4	Bournemouth (O, P)	46	20	14	12	60	48	+12	74	Qualification for the Third Division play-offs
5	Scunthorpe United	46	19	15	12	68	49	+19	72	Qualification for the Third Division play-offs
6	Lincoln City	46	18	16	12	46	37	+9	70	Qualification for the Third Division play-offs

Rules for classification: In the Football League goals scored (GF) takes precedence over goal difference (GD).
(O) Play-off winners; (P) Promoted

== Competitions ==
=== Legend ===
Win	Draw	Loss

=== Results ===
Game	Date	Opponent	Venue	Result	Attendance	Goalscorers
1	10 August 2002	Boston United	York Street	2–2	4,184	Maher 9' Stock 54'
2	13 August 2002	Kidderminster Harriers	Dean Court	0–0	4,771	
3	17 August 2002	Cambridge United	Dean Court	1–1	4,315	Feeney 65'
4	24 August 2002	Swansea City	Vetch Field	0–2	4,325	
5	27 August 2002	Oxford United	Dean Court	1–1	4,842	Holmes 42'
6	31 August 2002	Macclesfield Town	Moss Rose	1–0	1,795	Connell 41'
7	7 September 2002	Exeter City	St James Park	3–1	4,466	Connell 36' Elliott pen 41' O'Connor 73'
8	14 September 2002	Bury	Dean Court	1–2	4,851	O'Connor 71'
9	17 September 2002	Rushden & Diamonds	Dean Court	3–1	4,527	Purches 22' Maher 58' Connell 85'
10	21 September 2002	Darlington	Feethams	2–2	2,950	Holmes 27' Connell 82' Connell pen 77' Stock 86'
11	28 September 2002	Carlisle United	Dean Court	3–1	5,103	Tindall 62'
12	5 October 2002	Lincoln City	Sincil Bank	2–1	3,273	Purches 13' Connell 62'
13	13 October 2002	Hartlepool United	Dean Court	2–1	5,998	Elliott 61' Widdrington O.G. 85'
14	19 October 2002	Leyton Orient	Brisbane Road	0–0	5,622	
15	26 October 2002	York City	Dean Court	1–0	5,755	S. Fletcher 78'
16	29 October 2002	Torquay United	Plainmoor	0–4	3,543	
17	2 November 2002	Bristol Rovers	Dean Court	1–0	6,924	S. Fletcher 16'
18	9 November 2002	Wrexham	Racecourse Ground	2–3	3,105	Danny Thomas 30' Hayter 54'
19	23 November 2002	Southend United	Roots Hall	1–0	4,221	O'Connor pen 71'
20	30 November 2002	Scunthorpe United	Dean Court	2–1	6,527	Broadhurst 59'Hayter 66'
21	14 December 2002	Shrewsbury Town	Gay Meadow	0–0	2,869	
22	21 December 2002	Hull City	Dean Court	0–0	6,098	
23	26 December 2002	Oxford United	Kassam Stadium	0–3	8,349	
24	28 December 2002	Rochdale	Dean Court	3–3	6,240	Browning 6' S. Fletcher 45' O'Connor pen 87'
25	18 January 2003	Macclesfield Town	Dean Court	2–2	5,840	Elliott 68' Hayter 73'
26	1 February 2003	Boston United	Dean Court	2–1	5,180	Feeney 90' Redfearn O.G. 90'
27	4 February 2003	Kidderminster Harriers	Aggborough	0–1	2,157	
28	8 February 2003	Wrexham	Dean Court	2–0	5,445	Feeney 52' 55'
29	11 February 2003	Swansea City	Dean Court	3–0	5,511	Hayter 45'O'Connor pen 89' pen 90'
30	15 February 2003	Bristol Rovers	Memorial Stadium	0–0	6,347	
31	22 February 2003	Exeter City	Dean Court	2–0	6,674	Holmes 36'O'Connor 80'
32	1 March 2003	Bury	Gigg Lane	1–2	2,914	Feeney 12'
33	4 March 2003	Rushden & Diamonds	Nene Park	1–2	4,353	Feeney 43'
34	8 March 2003	Darlington	Dean Court	2–0	5,758	O'Connor 28'Hayter 67'
35	11 March 2003	Rochdale	Spotland	1–1	1,958	C. Fletcher 31'
36	15 March 2003	York City	Bootham Crescent	0–1	3,642	
37	18 March 2003	Leyton Orient	Dean Court	3–1	5,078	Jones O.G. 9' Joseph O.G. 17' Feeney 60'
38	22 March 2003	Torquay United	Dean Court	1–1	7,181	Clist O.G. '90
39	22 March 2003	Cambridge United	Abbey Stadium	1–2	2,885	S. Fletcher 42'
40	29 March 2003	Hartlepool United	Victoria Park	0–0	5,625	
41	5 April 2003	Scunthorpe United	Glanford Park	2–0	4,488	Hayter '49 Danny Thomas 77'
42	12 April 2003	Southend United	Dean Court	1–0	6,767	Purches 9'
43	19 April 2003	Hull City	KC Stadium	1–3	15,816	S. Fletcher 5'
44	21 April 2003	Shrewsbury Town	Dean Court	2–1	7,102	McDonald 22' Elliott 45'
45	26 April 2003	Lincoln City	Dean Court	0–1	7,578	
46	3 May 2003	Carlisle United	Brunton Park	2–0	7,402	Hayter 86' 90'

=== Third Division Playoffs ===
Round	Date	Opponent	Venue	Result	Attendance	Goalscorers
Semi Final Leg 1	10 May 2003	Bury	Gigg Lane	0–0	5,782	
Semi Final Leg 2	13 May 2003	Bury	Dean Court	3–1	7,945	O'Connor 21' Hayter 38' 60'
Final	24 May 2003	Lincoln City	Millennium Stadium	5–2	32,148	S. Fletcher 29' C. Fletcher 45' 77' Purches 56' O'Connor 60'

=== League Cup ===
Round	Date	Opponent	Venue	Result	Attendance	Goalscorers	Other
1	10 September 2002	Brentford	Dean Court	3–3	3,302	Thomas 3' 40'Connell 15'	A.E.T – Brentford won 4–2 on penalties

=== FA Cup ===
Round	Date	Opponent	Venue	Result	Attendance	Goalscorers	Other
1	16 November 2002	Doncaster Rovers	Dean Court	2–1	5,371	Thomas 38' Elliott 73'	
2	7 December 2002	Southend United	Roots Hall	1–1	5,721	Broadhurst 41'	
2R	17 December 2002	Southend United	Dean Court	3–2	5,456	S. Fletcher 39' Holmes 80' Browning '89	
3	4 January 2003	Crewe Alexandra	Dean Court	0–0	7,252		
3R	14 January 2003	Crewe Alexandra	Gresty Road	2–2	4,540	Hayter 38'S. Fletcher '98	Bournemouth won 3–1 on penalties
4	26 January 2003	Stoke City	Britannia Stadium	0–3	12,004		

=== Football League Trophy ===
Round	Date	Opponent	Venue	Result	Attendance	Goalscorers	Other
1	22 October 2002	Oxford United	Kassam Stadium	3–2	4,663	S. Fletcher '24 Hayter 34' Purches 38'	
2	12 November 2002	Leyton Orient	Dean Court	1–0	2,724	Feeney '90	
SQF	10 December 2002	Cardiff City	Dean Court	2–1	3,615	Elliott '79 Hayter 114'	Bournemouth won via Golden Goal
SSF	21 January 2003	Bristol City	Dean Court	1–3	5,125	C. Fletcher 31'	
