= 2003–04 AFC Bournemouth season =

Bournemouth
2003-04 season
- Manager: Sean O'Driscoll
- Ground: Dean Court
- Second Division: 9th
- FA Cup: Second Round
- Football League Cup: First Round
- Football League Trophy: First round
- Top goalscorer: League: James Hayter (14); All: James Hayter (14)

The 2003–04 AFC Bournemouth season was the club's first season back in the English Second Division following promotion the previous year. During the 2003–04 English football season, Bournemouth participated in Division Two, the LDV Vans Trophy, the FA Cup, and the Football League Cup. Bournemouth finished 9th in Division Two and were eliminated from the FA Cup in the Second Round. Both the LDV Vans Trophy and League Cup were exited in the First Round. James Hayter scored the fastest league hattrick of all time when he scored three goals in 140 seconds during a 6–0 win over Wrexham.

== Season squad ==
Note: Flags indicate national team as defined under FIFA eligibility rules; some limited exceptions apply. Players may hold more than one non-FIFA nationality.

No.	Pos.	Nation	Player
1	GK	ENG	Neil Moss
2	DF	ENG	Neil Young
3	DF	ENG	Stephen Purches
4	MF	WAL	Marcus Browning
5	DF	ENG	Karl Broadhurst
6	DF	IRL	Shaun Maher
7	DF	WAL	Carl Fletcher
8	MF	WAL	Brian Stock
9	FW	NIR	Warren Feeney
10	FW	ENG	Steve Fletcher
11	MF	ENG	Wade Elliott
12	MF	IRL	Garreth O'Connor

No.	Pos.	Nation	Player
13	GK	ENG	Gareth Stewart
14	FW	ENG	James Hayter
15	MF	ENG	James Coutts
16	FW	SCO	Derek Holmes
17	FW	ENG	Alan Connell
18	DF	ENG	Jason Tindall
21	GK	ENG	Kevin Scriven
24	DF	ENG	Stephen Cooke (on loan from Aston Villa)
26	DF	ENG	Lewis Buxton (on loan from Portsmouth)
28	DF	SCO	Warren Cummings
30	MF	FRO	Claus Jørgensen (on loan from Coventry City)

=== Left club during season ===
Note: Flags indicate national team as defined under FIFA eligibility rules; some limited exceptions apply. Players may hold more than one non-FIFA nationality.

No.	Pos.	Nation	Player
29	FW	ENG	Matthew Robinson (Released)
22	MF	ENG	Danny Thomas (joined Boston United on 19 March 2004)
23	MF	POR	Diogo Andrade (released)
25	FW	RSA	Gareth Williams (on loan from Crystal Palace)

== Competitions ==
=== Legend ===
Win	Draw	Loss

=== Results ===
Game	Date	Opponent	Venue	Result	Attendance	Goalscorers
1	9 August 2003	Port Vale	Vale Park	1–2	6,465	Hayter 73'
2	16 August 2003	Barnsley	Dean Court	2–2	5,960	S. Fletcher 27' 39'
3	23 August 2003	Queens Park Rangers	Loftus Road	0–1	13,065	
4	25 August 2003	Swindon Town	Dean Court	2-2	6,606	Maher 21' Hayter 61'
5	30 August 2003	Wrexham	Racecourse Ground	1–0	4,929	Purches 8'
6	6 September 2003	Bristol City	Dean Court	0–0	6,756	
7	13 September 2003	Blackpool	Bloomfield Road	2–1	5,607	Purches 49' Broadhurst 51'
8	16 September 2003	Sheffield Wednesday	Dean Court	1–0	8,219	Elliott 90'
9	20 September 2003	Rushden & Diamonds	Dean Court	2–1	6,464	Feeney 69' 71'
10	27 September 2003	Colchester United	Layer Road	0–1	3,602	
11	30 September 2003	Chesterfield	Saltergate	1–1	3,131	S. Fletcher 80'
12	4 October 2003	Hartlepool United	Dean Court	2–2	6,342	Holmes 79' Feeney 81'
13	11 October 2003	Notts County	Meadow Lane	1–0	4,419	S. Fletcher 54'
14	18 October 2003	Brighton & Hove Albion	Dean Court	1–0	7,908	Feeney 15'
15	21 October 2003	Luton Town	Dean Court	6–3	6,388	S. Fletcher 7' 45' O'Connor 42' Stock 34' 62' Elliott 67'
16	25 October 2003	Oldham Athletic	Boundary Park	1–1	5,850	Feeney 45'
17	1 November 2003	Tranmere Rovers	Prenton Park	1–1	7,123	Feeney 72'
18	15 November 2003	Peterborough United	Dean Court	1–2	6,963	Feeney 73'
19	22 November 2003	Stockport County	Edgeley Park	2–3	4,622	Hayter 67' Feeney 76'
20	29 November 2003	Brentford	Dean Court	1–0	6,674	Elliott 64'
21	13 December 2003	Grimsby Town	Dean Court	0–0	5,837	
22	20 December 2003	Wycombe Wanderers	Adams Park	0–2	5,205	
23	26 December 2003	Plymouth Argyle	Dean Court	0–2	8,901	
24	28 December 2003	Bristol City	Ashton Gate	0–2	13,807	
25	3 January 2004	Swindon Town	County Ground	1–2	7,158	Hayter 5'
26	10 January 2004	Port Vale	Dean Court	2–1	5,926	O'Connor pen 50' S. Fletcher 55'
27	17 January 2004	Barnsley	Oakwell	1–1	7,934	Hayter 31'
28	24 January 2004	Queens Park Rangers	Dean Court	1–0	8,909	Feeney 58'
29	7 February 2004	Plymouth Argyle	Home Park	0–0	13,371	
30	14 February 2004	Notts County	Dean Court	1–0	6,332	Hayter 83'
31	21 February 2004	Brighton & Hove Albion	Withdean Stadium	0–3	6,441	
32	24 February 2004	Wrexham	Dean Court	6–0	5,899	Purches 3' Cummings 45' Feeney 59' Hayter 86' 86' 88'
33	28 February 2004	Oldham Athletic	Dean Court	1–0	6,594	Hayter 61'
34	6 March 2004	Wycombe Wanderers	Dean Court	1–0	7,311	Cummings 20'
35	13 March 2004	Grimsby Town	Blundell Park	1–1	5,015	Warhurst O.G. 73'
36	17 March 2004	Sheffield Wednesday	Hillsborough	2–0	18,799	C. Fletcher 11'S. Fletcher 21'
37	24 March 2004	Blackpool	Dean Court	1–2	5,126	S. Fletcher 54'
38	27 March 2004	Rushden & Diamonds	Nene Park	3–0	4,500	Stock 37' Hayter 48' Feeney 62'
39	3 April 2004	Colchester United	Dean Court	1–1	6,896	Hayter 86'
40	10 April 2004	Hartlepool United	Victoria Park	1–2	5,544	Hayter 31'
41	12 April 2004	Chesterfield	Dean Court	2–2	7,081	Hayter '77 Holmes 80'
42	17 April 2004	Tranmere Rovers	Dean Court	1–5	7,063	Allen O.G. 71'
43	20 April 2004	Luton Town	Kenilworth Road	1–1	6,485	Feeney 75'
44	24 April 2004	Peterborough United	London Road	1–0	4,831	C. Fletcher 81'
45	1 May 2004	Stockport County	Dean Court	0–0	7,541	
46	8 May 2004	Brentford	Griffin Park	0–1	9,485	

=== League Cup ===
Round	Date	Opponent	Venue	Result	Attendance	Goalscorers
1	12 August 2003	Watford	Vicarage Road	0–1 (a.e.t.)	9,561	

=== FA Cup ===
Round	Date	Opponent	Venue	Result	Attendance	Goalscorers	Other
1	8 November 2003	Bristol Rovers	Dean Court	1–0	7,200	Elliott 37'	
2	6 December 2003	Accrington Stanley	Dean Court	1–1	7,551	Browning 56'	
2R	15 December 2003	Accrington Stanley	Crown Ground	0–0	2,585		Accrington won 5–3 on penalties

=== Football League Trophy ===
Round	Date	Opponent	Venue	Result	Attendance	Goalscorers
1	16 October 2003	Yeovil Town	Huish Park	0–2	5,035	
