= 2007–08 AFC Bournemouth season =

AFC Bournemouth
2007–08 season
- Manager: Kevin Bond
- Stadium: Dean Court
- League One: 21st (relegated)
- FA Cup: Second round
- League Cup: First round
- Football League Trophy: Quarter-finals
- Top goalscorer: League: Jo Kuffour and Sam Vokes (12); All: Jo Kuffour (13)
- Highest home attendance: 9,632 (vs. Leeds United, 6 November 2007)
- Lowest home attendance: 3,489 (vs. Luton Town, 22 January 2008)
- Average home league attendance: 5,504
Home colours	Away colours	Third colours

During the 2007–08 English football season, AFC Bournemouth competed in Football League One.

== Season summary ==
Bournemouth struggled all season amidst an injury crisis, and when they were docked ten points by the Football League after entering administration, with debts around £4 million, on 8 February, relegation appeared to be almost certain. The only bid that administrators Gerald Krasner and Begbies Traynor accepted came from a consortium led by chairman Jeff Mostyn. However, in a press conference on 3 April, Krasner said that, due to a breach of the agreement between the administrators and the consortium relating to the funding of the consortium and the sale of the club, the agreement broke down. Krasner also warned that the club might also be closed before the end of the season, unless appropriate funding came forward.

In spite of off-the-field issues with the club, Bournemouth achieved a remarkable string of results in League One. By 19 April, a winning streak of five matches left Bournemouth four points away from safety with two games remaining. The winning streak was increased to six matches on 26 April with a vital 1–0 victory over Crewe Alexandra. Victory or a draw away at Carlisle United on 3 May, depending on Cheltenham Town and Gillingham's results, would ensure Bournemouth's survival in the division. Former manager Harry Redknapp commented that escaping relegation "would be more than a great escape, it would be a miracle" and added that "if Kevin (Bond) doesn't get Manager of the Month there's something wrong". Bournemouth managed to achieve a 1–1 draw in the match against Carlisle United but, with Cheltenham Town winning 2–1 at home to Doncaster Rovers, were relegated to League Two.

Had Bournemouth not been given a points deduction as a result of entering administration, the club would have finished in 15th, at the expense of Crewe, who would have been relegated in their place.

== Results ==
Bournemouth's score comes first

=== Legend ===
Win	Draw	Loss

=== Football League One ===
Match	Date	Opponent	Venue	Result	Attendance	Scorers
1	11 August 2007	Nottingham Forest	A	0–0	18,791	
2	18 August 2007	Huddersfield Town	H	0–1	5,606	
3	25 August 2007	Doncaster Rovers	A	2–1	6,476	Gradel 28, Kuffour 46
4	1 September 2007	Port Vale	H	0–1	5,444	
5	8 September 2007	Leyton Orient	A	0–1	4,995	
6	15 September 2007	Northampton Town	H	1–1	5,009	Anderton 34
7	22 September 2007	Swindon Town	A	1–4	6,668	Hollands 37
8	29 September 2007	Carlisle United	H	1–3	4,940	Kuffour 54
9	2 October 2007	Brighton & Hove Albion	H	0–2	4,638	
10	6 October 2007	Crewe Alexandra	A	4–1	4,799	Bradbury 37, Gradel 61, 77, Anderton 85
11	14 October 2007	Swansea City	H	1–4	5,843	Bradbury (p) 31
12	20 October 2007	Millwall	A	1–2	7,805	Bradbury 90
13	27 October 2007	Walsall	H	1–1	5,414	Kuffour 20
14	3 November 2007	Bristol Rovers	A	2–0	6,405	Henry 41, 90
15	6 November 2007	Leeds United	H	1–3	9,632	Karacan 37
16	18 November 2007	Hartlepool United	A	1–1	3,496	Henry 16
17	24 November 2007	Oldham Athletic	H	0–3	5,261	
18	4 December 2007	Yeovil Town	A	1–2	5,321	Cummings (p) 65
19	8 December 2007	Tranmere Rovers	A	1–3	5,043	Vokes 76
20	15 December 2007	Gillingham	H	1–0	4,746	Pitman 34
21	21 December 2007	Northampton Town	A	1–4	4,806	Pitman 5
22	26 December 2007	Leyton Orient	H	3–1	5,356	Gradel 19, Vokes 54, Henry 89
23	26 December 2007	Swindon Town	H	2–2	6,540	Kuffour 63, Vokes 78
24	1 January 2008	Brighton & Hove Albion	A	2–3	5,963	Cristophe 24, Pitman 78
25	12 January 2008	Cheltenham Town	A	0–1	3,959	
26	19 January 2008	Southend United	H	1–4	5,419	Cummings 50
27	22 January 2008	Luton Town	H	4–3	3,489	Gradel 2, Kuffour 31, Vokes 89, Pitman 90
28	26 January 2008	Port Vale	A	3–1	4,047	Vokes 10, Hollands 28, Cooper 84
29	29 January 2008	Huddersfield Town	A	0–1	7,359	
30	2 February 2008	Nottingham Forest	H	2–0	7,251	Vokes 20, 29
31	9 February 2008	Luton Town	A	4–1	5,897	Vokes 13, Kuffour 14, 84, Gradel 45
32	12 February 2008	Doncaster Rovers	H	0–2	4,947	
33	16 February 2008	Southend United	A	1–2	7,474	Pearce 40
34	23 February 2008	Cheltenham Town	H	2–2	4,365	Gradel (p) 17, Bartley 39
35	1 March 2008	Hartlepool United	H	2–0	3,984	Vokes 6, 45
36	8 March 2008	Leeds United	A	0–2	21,199	
37	11 March 2008	Oldham Athletic	A	0–2	3,633	
38	15 March 2008	Yeovil Town	H	2–0	4,145	Hollands 9, Vokes 32
39	22 March 2008	Gillingham	A	1–2	6,540	Kuffour 28
40	24 March 2008	Tranmere Rovers	H	2–1	4,118	Goodison (og) 1, Kuffour 34
41	29 March 2008	Millwall	H	2–0	4,962	Gradel (p) 75, 89
42	5 April 2008	Swansea City	A	2–1	15,613	Partington 89, Kuffour 90
43	12 April 2008	Bristol Rovers	H	2–1	6,867	Anderton 18, Kuffour 55
44	19 April 2008	Walsall	A	3–1	4,530	Hollands 10, Kuffour 35, Pitman (p) 63
45	26 April 2008	Crewe Alexandra	H	1–0	8,621	Vokes 55
46	3 May 2008	Carlisle United	A	1–1	12,223	Pitman 68

=== FA Cup ===
Match	Date	Opponent	Venue	Result	Attendance	Scorers
R1	10 November 2007	Barrow	A	1–1	2,203	Karacan 45
R1 – Replay	20 November 2007	Barrow	H	3–2 (AET)	2,969	Golbourne 43, Gradel (p) 90, Hollands 120
R2	1 December 2007	Millwall	A	1–2	4,495	Cooper 74

=== Football League Cup ===
Match	Date	Opponent	Venue	Result	Attendance	Scorers
R1	14 August 2007	West Bromwich Albion	A	0–1	10,250	

=== Football League Trophy ===
Match	Date	Opponent	Venue	Result	Attendance	Scorers
R1	4 September 2007	Walsall	H	2–0	2,206	Bradbury 3, 8
R2	9 October 2007	Bristol Rovers	A	1–0	3,313	Kuffour 49
QF	1 December 2007	MK Dons	H	0–2	3,247	

== Squad ==
Squad at end of season

Note: Flags indicate national team as defined under FIFA eligibility rules; some limited exceptions apply. Players may hold more than one non-FIFA nationality.

No.	Pos.	Nation	Player
1	GK	ENG	Neil Moss
2	DF	ENG	Neil Young
3	DF	ENG	Ryan Garry
5	DF	ENG	Josh Gowling
6	DF	ENG	Russell Perrett
7	DF	ENG	Shaun Cooper
8	MF	ENG	Darren Anderton
9	FW	WAL	Sam Vokes
10	FW	ENG	Jo Kuffour
11	MF	IRL	Steven Foley-Sheridan
12	GK	ENG	Gareth Stewart
13	GK	ENG	Ryan Pryce
14	MF	ENG	Danny Hollands
15	DF	ENG	Jason Pearce
16	MF	ENG	Marvin Bartley

No.	Pos.	Nation	Player
17	MF	CIV	Max Gradel (on loan from Leicester City)
18	GK	IRL	David Forde (on loan from Cardiff City)
19	MF	ENG	Steve Hutchings
21	FW	ENG	Josh McQuoid
22	MF	ENG	Joe Partington
23	FW	ENG	Lee Bradbury
24	DF	ENG	Rob Newman
25	FW	NOR	Jo Tessem
26	FW	Jersey	Brett Pitman
28	DF	SCO	Warren Cummings
29	DF	ENG	Billy Franks
30	DF	ENG	James Queree
31	MF	ENG	Matt Finlay
33	FW	ENG	Jamie Davidson

=== Left club during season ===
Note: Flags indicate national team as defined under FIFA eligibility rules; some limited exceptions apply. Players may hold more than one non-FIFA nationality.

No.	Pos.	Nation	Player
4	DF	SCO	Paul Telfer (released)
18	GK	CAN	Asmir Begović (on loan from Portsmouth)
18	DF	ENG	Dominic Shimmin (on loan from Queen's Park Rangers)
19	MF	FRA	Jean-François Christophe (on loan from Portsmouth)
20	MF	IRL	Garreth O'Connor (on loan from Burnley)

No.	Pos.	Nation	Player
20	MF	TUR	Jem Karacan (on loan from Reading)
25	DF	IRL	Marc Wilson (on loan from Portsmouth)
31	FW	ENG	Adam Lallana (on loan from Southampton)
34	MF	ENG	James Henry (on loan from Reading)
35	DF	ENG	Alex Pearce (on loan from Reading)
36	DF	ENG	Scott Golbourne (on loan from Reading)
