= 2006–07 AFC Bournemouth season =

Bournemouth
2006–07 season
- Football League One: 18th
- FA Cup: Second round
- League Cup: First round
- League Trophy: First round
Home colours

The 2006–07 season saw Bournemouth compete in Football League One where they finished in 18th position with 52 points.

== Final league table ==
| Pos | Team | Pld | W | D | L | GF | GA | GD | Pts | Promotion, qualification or relegation |
|---|---|---|---|---|---|---|---|---|---|---|
| 17 | Cheltenham Town | 46 | 15 | 9 | 22 | 49 | 61 | −12 | 54 | |
| 18 | Brighton & Hove Albion | 46 | 14 | 11 | 21 | 49 | 58 | −9 | 53 | |
| 19 | Bournemouth | 46 | 13 | 13 | 20 | 50 | 64 | −14 | 52 | |
| 20 | Leyton Orient | 46 | 12 | 15 | 19 | 61 | 77 | −16 | 51 | |
| 21 | Chesterfield (R) | 46 | 12 | 11 | 23 | 45 | 53 | −8 | 47 | Relegation to Football League Two |

Rules for classification: In the Football League goals scored (GF) takes precedence over goal difference (GD).
(R) Relegated

== Results ==
Bournemouth's score comes first

=== Legend ===
| Win | Draw | Loss |

=== Football League One ===
| Match | Date | Opponent | Venue | Result | Attendance | Scorers |
|---|---|---|---|---|---|---|
| 1 | 5 August 2006 | Chesterfield | H | 0–3 | 5,499 | |
| 2 | 8 August 2006 | Yeovil Town | A | 0–0 | 6,451 | |
| 3 | 12 August 2006 | Leyton Orient | A | 2–3 | 4,474 | Hayter, Cooke |
| 4 | 19 August 2006 | Cheltenham Town | H | 2–1 | 5,378 | Fletcher, Best |
| 5 | 26 August 2006 | Doncaster Rovers | A | 1–1 | 5,190 | Hayter |
| 6 | 2 September 2006 | Oldham Athletic | H | 3–2 | 4,838 | Hayter (2), Browning |
| 7 | 9 September 2006 | Crewe Alexandra | H | 1–0 | 5,627 | Best |
| 8 | 12 September 2006 | Brighton & Hove Albion | A | 2–2 | 5,627 | Foley-Sheridan, Howe |
| 9 | 16 September 2006 | Brentford | A | 0–0 | 6,272 | |
| 10 | 23 September 2006 | Scunthorpe United | H | 1–1 | 5,262 | Anderton |
| 11 | 26 September 2006 | Bristol City | H | 0–1 | 6,468 | |
| 12 | 30 September 2006 | Huddersfield Town | A | 2–2 | 11,350 | Hayter, Best |
| 13 | 6 October 2006 | Northampton Town | H | 0–0 | 5,746 | |
| 14 | 14 October 2006 | Millwall | A | 0–1 | 9,838 | |
| 15 | 21 October 2006 | Rotherham United | H | 1–3 | 5,544 | Gowling |
| 16 | 28 October 2006 | Tranmere Rovers | A | 0–1 | 6,074 | |
| 17 | 3 November 2006 | Swansea City | A | 2–4 | 11,795 | Hollands, Pitman |
| 18 | 18 November 2006 | Carlisle United | H | 0–1 | 5,682 | |
| 19 | 25 November 2006 | Bradford City | A | 0–0 | 10,347 | |
| 20 | 5 December 2006 | Nottingham Forest | H | 2–0 | 7,067 | Connolly, Pitman |
| 21 | 9 December 2006 | Port Vale | H | 0–4 | 4,538 | |
| 22 | 16 December 2006 | Gillingham | A | 1–1 | 6,259 | Vokes |
| 23 | 23 December 2006 | Blackpool | H | 1–3 | 5,758 | Gillett |
| 24 | 26 December 2006 | Bristol City | A | 2–2 | 13,848 | Pitman, Browning |
| 25 | 30 December 2006 | Scunthorpe United | A | 2–3 | 4,794 | Vokes (2) |
| 26 | 1 January 2007 | Brighton & Hove Albion | H | 1–0 | 6,686 | Pitman |
| 27 | 6 January 2007 | Brentford | H | 1–0 | 5,782 | Anderton |
| 28 | 13 January 2007 | Crewe Alexandra | A | 0–2 | 4,739 | |
| 29 | 20 January 2007 | Huddersfield Town | H | 1–2 | 5,632 | Purches |
| 30 | 3 February 2007 | Chesterfield | A | 1–0 | 3,854 | Hayter |
| 31 | 10 February 2007 | Leyton Orient | H | 5–0 | 5,958 | Wilson, Anderton (3), Hayter |
| 32 | 17 February 2007 | Cheltenham Town | A | 0–1 | 4,530 | |
| 33 | 20 February 2007 | Yeovil Town | H | 0–2 | 7,258 | |
| 34 | 24 February 2007 | Oldham Athletic | A | 2–1 | 5,429 | McGoldrick, Viðarsson |
| 35 | 3 March 2007 | Doncaster Rovers | H | 2–0 | 6,166 | McGoldrick, Pitman |
| 36 | 6 March 2007 | Blackpool | A | 0–2 | 6,184 | |
| 37 | 10 March 2007 | Northampton Town | A | 1–3 | 5,921 | Wilson |
| 38 | 17 March 2007 | Millwall | H | 1–0 | 7,194 | Anderton |
| 39 | 24 March 2007 | Tranmere Rovers | H | 2–0 | 5,640 | McGoldrick, Hayter |
| 40 | 31 March 2007 | Rotherham United | A | 2–0 | 3,657 | McGoldrick, Hayter |
| 41 | 7 April 2007 | Bradford City | H | 1–1 | 6,440 | McGoldrick |
| 42 | 9 April 2007 | Carlisle United | A | 1–3 | 8,989 | Vokes |
| 43 | 14 April 2007 | Swansea City | H | 2–2 | 6,789 | Wilson, McGoldrick |
| 44 | 21 April 2007 | Nottingham Forest | A | 0–3 | 19,898 | |
| 45 | 28 April 2007 | Gillingham | H | 1–1 | 8,001 | Hayter |
| 46 | 5 May 2007 | Port Vale | A | 1–2 | 5,080 | Summerfield |

=== FA Cup ===
| Match | Date | Opponent | Venue | Result | Attendance | Scorers |
|---|---|---|---|---|---|---|
| R1 | 11 November 2006 | Boston United | H | 4–0 | 4,263 | Fletcher (2), Hayter, Hollands |
| R2 | 2 December 2006 | Bristol Rovers | A | 1–1 | 6,252 | Hayter |
| R3 Replay | 12 December 2006 | Bristol Rovers | H | 0–1 | 4,153 | |

=== Football League Cup ===
| Match | Date | Opponent | Venue | Result | Attendance | Scorers |
|---|---|---|---|---|---|---|
| R1 | 22 August 2006 | Southend United | H | 1–3 | 3,013 | Fletcher |

=== Football League Trophy ===
| Match | Date | Opponent | Venue | Result | Attendance | Scorers |
|---|---|---|---|---|---|---|
| R1 | 31 October 2006 | Millwall | A | 0–2 | 1,905 | |

== Squad statistics ==
| No. | Pos. | Name | League | | FA Cup | | League Cup | | Other | | Total | |
| No. | Pos. | Name | Apps | Goals | Apps | Goals | Apps | Goals | Apps | Goals | Apps | Goals |
|---|---|---|---|---|---|---|---|---|---|---|---|---|
| 1 | GK | (England) Neil Moss | 27 | 0 | 3 | 0 | 1 | 0 | 1 | 0 | 32 | 0 |
| 2 | DF | (England) Neil Young | 34 | 0 | 3 | 0 | 0 | 0 | 1 | 0 | 38 | 0 |
| 3 | DF | (England) Stephen Purches | 38(5) | 1 | 2 | 0 | 1 | 0 | 1 | 0 | 42(5) | 1 |
| 4 | MF | (England) Marcus Browning | 17(4) | 2 | 0 | 0 | 0 | 0 | 0 | 0 | 17(4) | 2 |
| 5 | DF | (England) Karl Broadhurst | 25(2) | 0 | 2 | 0 | 1 | 0 | 0 | 0 | 28(2) | 0 |
| 6 | DF | (Republic of Ireland) Shaun Maher | 5(2) | 0 | 1 | 0 | 0 | 0 | 0 | 0 | 6(2) | 0 |
| 7 | MF | (England) Stephen Cooke | 6(4) | 1 | 0 | 0 | 1 | 0 | 0 | 0 | 7(4) | 1 |
| 8 | DF | (England) Shaun Cooper | 29(4) | 0 | 2 | 0 | 1 | 0 | 0 | 0 | 32(4) | 0 |
| 9 | FW | (Republic of Ireland) Leon Best | 12(3) | 3 | 0 | 0 | 1 | 0 | 1 | 0 | 14(3) | 3 |
| 9 | FW | (England) David McGoldrick | 12 | 6 | 0 | 0 | 0 | 0 | 0 | 0 | 12 | 6 |
| 10 | FW | (England) Steve Fletcher | 32(9) | 1 | 3 | 2 | 1 | 1 | 0 | 0 | 36(9) | 4 |
| 11 | MF | (Republic of Ireland) Steven Foley-Sheridan | 15(3) | 1 | 1(1) | 0 | 1 | 0 | 0(1) | 0 | 17(5) | 1 |
| 12 | MF | (England) Danny Hollands | 14(19) | 1 | 3 | 1 | 0(1) | 0 | 1 | 0 | 18(20) | 2 |
| 13 | GK | (England) Ryan Pryce | 0 | 0 | 0 | 0 | 0 | 0 | 0 | 0 | 0 | 0 |
| 14 | FW | (England) James Hayter | 41(1) | 10 | 3 | 2 | 1 | 0 | 1 | 0 | 46(1) | 12 |
| 15 | MF | (England) James Coutts | 0 | 0 | 0 | 0 | 0 | 0 | 0 | 0 | 0 | 0 |
| 16 | DF | (England) Josh Gowling | 25(8) | 1 | 1 | 0 | 1 | 0 | 1 | 0 | 28(8) | 1 |
| 17 | FW | (England) Conal Platt | 0 | 0 | 0 | 0 | 0(1) | 0 | 0 | 0 | 0(1) | 0 |
| 19 | MF | (England) Daryl Taylor | 0 | 0 | 0 | 0 | 0 | 0 | 0 | 0 | 0 | 0 |
| 20 | DF | (England) Eddie Howe | 14(1) | 1 | 0(1) | 0 | 0 | 0 | 0 | 0 | 14(2) | 1 |
| 21 | DF | (Wales) Callum Hart | 8 | 0 | 1(1) | 0 | 1 | 0 | 1 | 0 | 11(1) | 0 |
| 22 | FW | (Northern Ireland) Curtis Allen | 0 | 0 | 0 | 0 | 0 | 0 | 0 | 0 | 0 | 0 |
| 23 | FW | (Northern Ireland) Josh McQuoid | 0(2) | 0 | 0 | 0 | 0 | 0 | 0 | 0 | 0(2) | 0 |
| 23 | MF | (Northern Ireland) Lionel Ainsworth | 2(5) | 0 | 0(1) | 0 | 0 | 0 | 0(1) | 0 | 2(7) | 0 |
| 24 | GK | (England) Gareth Stewart | 19 | 0 | 0 | 0 | 0 | 0 | 0 | 0 | 19 | 0 |
| 25 | MF | (England) Darren Anderton | 28 | 6 | 2 | 0 | 0 | 0 | 1 | 0 | 30 | 6 |
| 26 | FW | (England) Brett Pitman | 8(20) | 5 | 0(2) | 0 | 0 | 0 | 0 | 0 | 8(22) | 5 |
| 28 | DF | (Scotland) Warren Cummings | 26(5) | 0 | 0 | 0 | 0(1) | 0 | 1 | 0 | 27(7) | 0 |
| 29 | DF | (England) Ryan Bertrand | 5 | 0 | 2 | 0 | 0 | 0 | 0 | 0 | 7 | 0 |
| 30 | DF | (Republic of Ireland) Marc Wilson | 19 | 3 | 0 | 0 | 0 | 0 | 0 | 0 | 19 | 3 |
| 30 | MF | (Cameroon) Franck Songo'o | 3(1) | 0 | 0 | 0 | 0 | 0 | 0(1) | 0 | 3(2) | 0 |
| 30 | MF | (England) Simon Gillett | 7 | 1 | 0 | 0 | 0 | 0 | 0 | 0 | 7 | 1 |
| 31 | MF | (England) Jack Cork | 7 | 0 | 2 | 0 | 0 | 0 | 0 | 0 | 9 | 0 |
| 31 | FW | (England) James Lawson | 2(2) | 0 | 0 | 0 | 0 | 0 | 0 | 0 | 2(2) | 0 |
| 34 | DF | (England) Matthew Connolly | 3(2) | 1 | 2 | 0 | 0 | 0 | 0 | 0 | 5(2) | 1 |
| 35 | FW | (Wales) Sam Vokes | 8(5) | 4 | 0(1) | 0 | 0 | 0 | 0 | 0 | 8(6) | 4 |
| 36 | MF | (England) Luke Summerfield | 5(3) | 1 | 0 | 0 | 0 | 0 | 0 | 0 | 5(3) | 1 |
| 36 | FW | (England) Steve Claridge | 1 | 0 | 0 | 0 | 0 | 0 | 0 | 0 | 1 | 0 |
| 36 | MF | (England) Michael Standing | 0(1) | 0 | 0 | 0 | 0 | 0 | 0 | 0 | 0(1) | 0 |
| 36 | MF | (Iceland) Bjarni Viðarsson | 4(2) | 1 | 0 | 0 | 0 | 0 | 0 | 0 | 4(2) | 1 |
| 37 | MF | (England) Josh Walker | 5(1) | 0 | 0 | 0 | 0 | 0 | 0 | 0 | 5(1) | 0 |
