= 2007–08 Burnley F.C. season =

English football club season

Burnley
2007–08 season
- Chairman: Barry Kilby
- Manager: Steve Cotterill (until 8 November 2007); Steve Davis (caretaker manager); Owen Coyle (from 22 November 2007)
- Championship: 13th
- FA Cup: Third round
- League Cup: Third round
- Top goalscorer: League: Andy Gray (11); All: Andy Gray (13)
- Highest home attendance: 16,843 v Blackpool (15 September 2007)
- Lowest home attendance: 7,317 v Oldham Athletic (28 August 2007)
- Average home league attendance: 12,365

The 2007–08 season was Burnley's 8th season in the second tier of English football. They were managed by Steve Cotterill in his fourth full season since he replaced Stan Ternent at the beginning of the 2004–05 season. He was sacked on 8 November 2007 after a poor run of results and replaced by Owen Coyle. Caretaker manager Steve Davis was put in charge of first team duties for the match against Leicester City on 10 November 2007.

== Appearances and goals ==
Numbers in parentheses denote appearances as substitute.
Players with names struck through and marked † left the club during the playing season.
Players with names in italics and marked * were on loan from another club for the whole of their season with Burnley.
Players listed with no appearances have been in the matchday squad but only as unused substitutes.
Key to positions: GK – Goalkeeper; DF – Defender; MF – Midfielder; FW – Forward

Players contracted for the 2007–08 season
No.	Pos.	Nat.	Name	League		FA Cup		League Cup		Total		Discipline	
No.	Pos.	Nat.	Name	Apps	Goals	Apps	Goals	Apps	Goals	Apps	Goals	A yellow rectangle, denoting the yellow penalty card shown to a player being cautioned	A red rectangle, denoting the red penalty card shown to a player being sent off
1	GK	HUN	Gábor Király	27	0	1	0	1	0	29	0	0	0
2	DF	ENG	~~Stephen Foster~~ †	0	0	0	0	1	0	1	0	0	0
2	DF	SCO	Graham Alexander	43	1	1	0	0 (1)	0	44 (1)	1	10	0
3	DF	ENG	Jon Harley	31 (2)	0	1	0	0 (1)	0	32 (3)	0	5	0
4	DF	NIR	Michael Duff	8	1	0	0	2	0	10	1	2	0
5	DF	ENG	~~Wayne Thomas~~ †	1	0	0	0	0	0	1	0	0	0
5	DF	ENG	Clarke Carlisle	32 (1)	2	0	0	2	0	34 (1)	2	4	2
6	DF	SCO	Steven Caldwell	26 (3)	2	1	0	2	0	29 (3)	2	8	1
7	MF	IRL	James O'Connor	24 (5)	3	1	0	2 (1)	0	27 (6)	3	4	0
8	MF	ISL	Joey Guðjónsson	13 (15)	1	0 (1)	0	1	0	14 (16)	1	2	2
9	FW	NGA	Ade Akinbiyi	14 (25)	8	0 (1)	0	2 (1)	1	16 (27)	9	4	0
10	FW	SCO	~~Andy Gray~~ †	25	11	1	0	1 (1)	2	27 (1)	13	1	0
10	MF	ENG	Mark Randall *	2 (8)	0	0	0	0	0	2 (8)	0	2	0
11	MF	ENG	Wade Elliott	45 (1)	2	1	0	1	0	47 (1)	2	6	0
12	GK	DEN	Brian Jensen	19	0	0	0	2	0	21	0	0	0
14	FW	NIR	Steve Jones	1 (16)	1	0 (1)	0	2 (1)	0	3 (18)	1	0	0
15	MF	ENG	John Spicer	9 (15)	0	0	0	3	0	12 (15)	0	2	1
16	MF	IRL	Chris McCann	34 (1)	5	1	0	1	0	36 (1)	5	7	1
17	FW	NIR	Kyle Lafferty	34 (3)	5	1	0	2	0	37 (3)	5	5	1
18	MF	IRL	Alan Mahon	13 (13)	1	0	0	2 (1)	0	15 (14)	1	4	0
19	FW	ENG	Jay Rodriguez	0 (1)	0	0	0	0	0	0 (1)	0	0	0
20	FW	ENG	Robbie Blake	41 (4)	9	1	0	1 (2)	1	43 (6)	10	4	0
21	MF	IRL	Garreth O'Connor	0 (1)	0	0	0	0	0	0 (1)	0	0	0
22	FW	ALB	Besart Berisha	0	0	0	0	0	0	0	0	0	0
23	DF	ENG	Stephen Jordan	20 (1)	0	0	0	3	0	23 (1)	0	4	0
24	DF	SVK	Stanislav Varga *	10	0	1	0	0	0	11	0	3	0
25	MF	ENG	Adam Kay	0	0	0	0	0	0	0	0	0	0
26	DF	ENG	David Unsworth	26 (3)	1	0	0	2	0	28 (3)	1	6	1
27	FW	ENG	Andy Cole *	8 (5)	6	0	0	0	0	8 (5)	6	1	0
28	FW	SCO	Alex MacDonald	0 (2)	0	0	0	0	0	0 (2)	0	0	0

== Transfers ==
=== In ===
#	Pos	Player	From	Fee	Date
1	GK	(Hungary) Gábor Király	(England) Crystal Palace	Free	30 May 2007
22	FW	(Albania) Besart Berisha	(Germany) Hamburg	£340,000	3 July 2007
20	FW	(England) Robbie Blake	(England) Leeds United	£250,000	13 July 2007
26	DF	(England) David Unsworth	(England) Wigan Athletic	Free	13 August 2007
5	DF	(England) Clarke Carlisle	(England) Watford	£200,000	16 August 2007
2	DF	(Scotland) Graham Alexander	(England) Preston North End	£100,000	31 August 2007
25	DF	(Slovakia) Stanislav Varga	(England) Sunderland	Loan	4 January 2008
27	FW	(England) Andrew Cole	(England) Sunderland	Loan	29 January 2008
10	MF	(England) Mark Randall	(England) Arsenal	Loan	31 January 2008

=== Out ===
#	Pos	Player	To	Fee	Date
	DF	(England) John McGreal		Retired	8 May 2007
	DF	(Jamaica) Frank Sinclair	(England) Huddersfield Town	Free	14 May 2007
	GK	(Wales) Danny Coyne	(England) Tranmere Rovers	Free	3 July 2007
	MF	(England) Graham Branch	(England) Accrington Stanley	Free	10 July 2007
	MF	(Republic of Ireland) Garreth O'Connor	(England) Bournemouth	Loan	10 August 2007
5	DF	(England) Wayne Thomas	(England) Southampton	£1,200,000	16 August 2007
2	DF	(England) Stephen Foster	(England) Barnsley	£100,000	24 August 2007
19	FW	(England) Jay Rodriguez	(Scotland) Stirling Albion	Loan	11 January 2008
10	FW	(Scotland) Andy Gray	(England) Charlton Athletic	Loan	18 January 2008
10	FW	(Scotland) Andy Gray	(England) Charlton Athletic	£1,500,000	25 January 2008
14	FW	(Northern Ireland) Steve Jones	(England) Crewe Alexandra	Loan	27 March 2008

== Match details ==
=== Football League Championship ===
Football League Championship match details
Date	League position	Opponents	Venue	Result	Score F–A	Scorers	Attendance	Ref
11 August 2007	5th	West Bromwich Albion	H	W	2–1	Duff 47', Gray 79' pen.	15,337	
18 August 2007	12th	Scunthorpe United	A	L	0–2		6,975	
1 September 2007	12th	Colchester United	A	W	3–2	Mahon 15', Gray (2) 29', 63' pen.	4,925	
15 September 2007	10th	Blackpool	H	D	2–2	Jones 52', Akinbiyi 86'	16,843	
18 September 2007	6th	Sheffield Wednesday	A	W	2–0	Blake 15', McCann 48'	18,359	
22 September 2007	6th	Bristol City	A	D	2–2	Gray 52', Carlisle 90'	14,079	
29 September 2007	7th	Crystal Palace	H	D	1–1	Blake 13'	10,711	
2 October 2007	8th	Ipswich Town	H	D	2–2	Lafferty 11', Gray 60'	9,952	
6 October 2007	13th	Cardiff City	A	L	1–2	Akinbiyi 50'	12,914	
20 October 2007	13th	Barnsley	A	D	1–1	Gray 11'	11,560	
23 October 2007	10th	Norwich City	H	W	2–1	Blake 1', Gray 4' pen.	10,133	
27 October 2007	12th	Southampton	H	L	2–3	McCann 31', Akinbiyi 83'	10,944	
3 November 2007	13th	Sheffield United	A	D	0–0		25,306	
6 November 2007	15th	Hull City	H	L	0–1		9,978	
10 November 2007	13th	Leicester City	A	W	1–0	Gray 23'	21,334	
24 November 2007	13th	Stoke City	H	D	0–0		11,758	
27 November 2007	11th	Watford	A	W	2–1	Gray 58', Guðjónsson 80'	15,021	
1 December 2007	9th	Charlton Athletic	A	W	3–1	Gray (2) 8', 70' pen., McCann 13'	21,122	
4 December 2007	10th	Leicester City	H	D	1–1	Unsworth 19'	10,688	
8 December 2007	7th	Wolverhampton Wanderers	A	W	3–2	Blake 20', Lafferty 30', Ward 42' o.g.	20,763	
11 December 2007	8th	Queens Park Rangers	H	L	0–2		10,522	
15 December 2007	9th	Preston North End	H	L	2–3	Lafferty 31', McCann 62'	14,829	
22 December 2007	9th	Ipswich Town	A	D	0–0		20,077	
26 December 2007	10th	Sheffield Wednesday	H	D	1–1	Akinbiyi 31'	15,326	
29 December 2007	11th	Bristol City	H	L	0–1		12,109	
1 January 2008	12th	Blackpool	A	L	0–3		9,599	
12 January 2008	11th	Plymouth Argyle	H	W	1–0	Blake 66'	14,162	
19 January 2008	9th	Coventry City	A	W	2–1	Akinbiyi 10', Blake 68'	17,347	
26 January 2008	7th	Scunthorpe United	H	W	2–0	Blake 9', Akinbiyi 32'	14,516	
2 February 2008	10th	West Bromwich Albion	A	L	1–2	J. O'Connor 3'	22,206	
9 February 2008	9th	Colchester United	H	D	1–1	Cole 23'	15,376	
12 February 2008	7th	Queens Park Rangers	A	W	4–2	Cole (3) 41', 56', 86', Akinbiyi 77'	13,410	
23 February 2008	9th	Plymouth Argyle	A	L	1–3	J. O'Connor 19'	13,557	
26 February 2008	9th	Coventry City	H	W	2–0	McCann 20', Caldwell 85'	9,779	
1 March 2008	8th	Watford	H	D	2–2	Blake (2) 75', 88'	13,677	
4 March 2008	9th	Hull City	A	L	0–2		15,838	
8 March 2008	10th	Stoke City	A	D	1–1	Lafferty 3'	18,432	
11 March 2008	8th	Charlton Athletic	H	W	1–0	Elliott 59'	10,700	
15 March 2008	10th	Wolverhampton Wanderers	H	L	1–3	Akinbiyi 76'	12,749	
22 March 2008	11th	Preston North End	A	L	1–2	J. O'Connor 38'	16,149	
29 March 2008	10th	Barnsley	H	W	2–1	Elliott 30', Lafferty 36'	11,925	
5 April 2008	11th	Norwich City	A	L	0–2		24,049	
12 April 2008	13th	Sheffield United	H	L	1–2	Cole 80'	11,693	
19 April 2008	12th	Southampton	A	W	1–0	Caldwell 45'	21,762	
26 April 2008	11th	Cardiff City	H	D	3–3	Alexander 36', Cole 54', Carlisle 86'	10,694	
4 May 2008	13th	Crystal Palace	A	L	0–5		23,950	

=== Final league position ===
Pos	Team	Pld	W	D	L	GF	GA	GD	Pts
11	Charlton Athletic	46	17	13	16	63	58	+5	64
12	Cardiff City	46	16	16	14	59	55	+4	64
13	Burnley	46	16	14	16	60	67	−7	62
14	Queens Park Rangers	46	14	16	16	60	66	−6	58
15	Preston North End	46	15	11	20	50	56	−6	56

Updated to match(es) played on 4 May 2008. Source: The Football League
Rules for classification: 1) points; 2) goal difference; 3) number of goals scored.

=== FA Cup ===
FA Cup match details
Round	Date	Opponents	Venue	Result	Score F–A	Scorers	Attendance	Ref
Third round	6 January 2008	Arsenal	H	L	0–2		16,709	

=== Football League Cup ===
Football League Cup match details
Round	Date	Opponents	Venue	Result	Score F–A	Scorers	Attendance	Ref
First round	14 August 2007	Grimsby Town	A	D	1–1 (a.e.t.); 4–2 pens.	Gray 108'	2,431	
Second round	28 August 2007	Oldham Athletic	H	W	3–0	Gray 59', Blake 76', Akinbiyi 90'	7,317	
Third round	25 September 2007	Portsmouth	H	L	0–1		8,202	
