= Wade Elliott =

English footballer (born 1978)

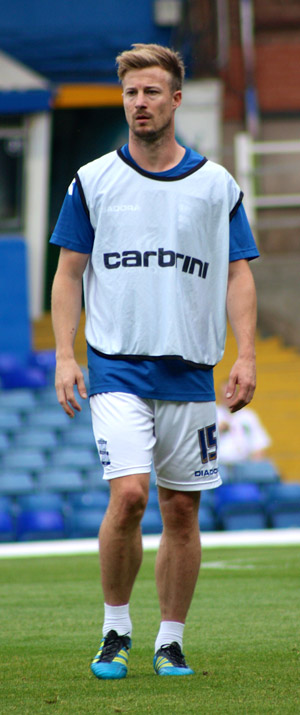
- With Birmingham City in 2012 pre-season

Personal information
- Full name: Wade Patrick Elliott
- Date of birth: 14 December 1978 (age 47)
- Place of birth: Southampton, England
- Height: 5 ft 10 in (1.78 m)
- Position: Midfielder

Youth career
- –1994: Southampton

Senior career*
Years	Team	Apps	(Gls)
1997–2000	Bashley	68	(0)
2000–2005	AFC Bournemouth	220	(31)
2005–2011	Burnley	252	(19)
2011–2014	Birmingham City	88	(8)
2014	→ Bristol City (loan)	19	(3)
2014–2015	Bristol City	36	(2)
Total		683	(63)

Managerial career
- 2015–2016: Bristol City U21s
- 2016: Bristol City (caretaker)
- 2018: Stoke City U23s
- 2022–2023: Cheltenham Town
- * Club domestic league appearances and goals

Wade Patrick Elliott (born 14 December 1978) is an English former professional footballer who was most recently head coach of EFL League One club Cheltenham Town. He played mainly as a right midfielder but could also play as a central midfielder.

Elliott began playing football as a youth player for Southampton before joining non-league Bashley. He began his professional career at AFC Bournemouth after joining from Bashley for £15,000. After five years he joined Burnley where he won two player of the year awards and scored the only goal in the 2009 play-off final elevating his team to the Premier League. He moved on to Birmingham City in 2011, playing regularly for two seasons. He spent time on loan at Bristol City in 2014, and joined them on a permanent contract after his release from Birmingham at the end of the 2013–14 season.

Having achieved promotion from League One to the Championship with Bristol City in the 2014–15 season, Elliott retired from playing in June 2015 in order to take up a coaching role at the club. After leaving Bristol City in June 2016 Elliott played in several pre-season Friendlies for National League side Forest Green Rovers, reportedly in advance of taking a joint role of player and youth team coach.

== Playing career ==
=== Youth and non-League ===
Elliott was born in Southampton, and began playing football as a youth player at Southampton, during which time he also represented England schoolboys. Elliott was released from the Southampton youth setup when he was 16 and instead went on to do his A-levels. Elliot carried on playing football at non-League Bashley while studying at university – he did two years of a degree course in communications and sociology at Goldsmiths' College and completed the degree via the Open University – and was spotted by former AFC Bournemouth player Jimmy Case who organised a trial match for him at the League One club. He trained with Bournemouth from Christmas 1998, and signed for a fee of £5,000 in February 2000. The club's director of football, Mel Machin, later called Elliott's price as "some of the best money he have ever spent".

=== AFC Bournemouth ===
Elliott made his debut for AFC Bournemouth, coming on as a 76th-minute substitute, in a 2–0 loss against Reading on 4 March 2000. He scored three goals in the twelve games he played in his first season with the club. In the following 2000–01 season, Elliot began to have more and more of an impact for AFC Bournemouth. Elliot scored two important goals in the FA Cup matches against Swansea City and Nuneaton Borough to help the club reach all the way to the third round. However, he received a straight red card for elbowing John Dreyer, in a 2–0 win against Cambridge United on 23 January 2001; and served a three match suspension as a result. Elliott returned to the first team from suspension, in a 2–1 loss against Oldham Athletic on 24 February 2001. He then scored four times throughout March, including a brace against Bristol City on 10 March 2001. Due to his performance, Elliott became AFC Bournemouth's fan favourite among supporters, who likened him to John Bailey. His performance also led the club began open talks with him over a new contract. He later scored four more goals in the last three matches of the season, including a brace against Reading, which AFC Bournemouth missed out of the play–offs. Together with Claus Bech Jørgensen, Richard Hughes and Carl Fletcher, the quartet scored thirty–four goals combined. In his first full season at Bournemouth, Elliott made forty–one appearances and scoring eleven times in all competitions. For his performance, he won multiple awards, including winning the club's Player of the Year award. On 5 May 2001, Elliot signed a new contract with AFC Bournemouth, keeping him until 2004.

In the 2001–02 season, Elliott continued to regain his first team place in the midfield position. On 1 September 2001, he scored a brace, in a 2–2 draw against Cambridge United. Elliot scored two goals in two matches between 5 October 2001 and 9 October 2001, coming against Oldham Athletic and Wigan Athletic. He scored another brace, in a 4–2 win against Notts County on 27 October 2001. By mid–December, Elliot started in every matches for AFC Bournemouth until he was demoted to the substitute bench. As the 2001–02 season progressed, he soon won his place back in the first team, due to the club's struggles and eventually relegation to the Third Division. Despite this, he scored two goals later in the season, coming against Cambridge United and Chesterfield. Having played in every league matches throughout the 2001–02 season, Elliott made fifty appearances and scoring eight times in all competitions.

At the start of the 2002–03 season, Elliott scored his first goal of the season, in a 3–1 win against Exeter City on 7 September 2002. A week later against Bury, however, he received a straight red card at half time for giving away a penalty, resulting in AFC Bournemouth losing 2–1. After serving a one match suspension, Elliot made his return to the starting line–up against Lincoln City and helped the club win 2–1. In a follow–up match against Hartlepool United, he scored his second goal of the season, in a 2–1 win. Following his return from suspension, Elliott found himself, rotating between the starting line–up and substitute bench. During which, he was AFC Bournemouth's representative for the Professional Footballers' Association. However, Elliott was relieved of his duty as the club's penalty kicker. It came after when he missed penalties since being given a duty earlier in the 2001–02 season and his penalty record has been mixed at the club. Afterwards, Elliott scored two times, both in cup competitions by the end of the year. He then scored two more league goals later in the 2002–03 season. Along the way, Elliott was affected by injuries but did not affect his season. Despite this, he helped AFC Bournemouth win the play–offs and sealed the promotion back to the Second Division after beating Lincoln City 5–2. At the end of the 2002–03 season, Elliott made fifty–eight appearances and scoring six times in all competitions.

At the start of the 2003–04 season, Elliott continued to rotate between the starting line–up and substitute bench. He scored his first goal of the season at a last minute goal, in a 1–0 win against Sheffield Wednesday on 16 September 2003. Elliott then made his 150th appearance for AFC Bournemouth, in a 1–0 win against Notts County on 11 October 2003. He added three more goals by the end of the year, including scoring the only goal of the game against Bristol Rovers and Brentford. However, by 2004, Elliott's form dropped and found his playing time from the substitute bench. At the end of the 2003–04 season, he made forty–four appearances and scoring four times in all competitions. Elliott was out of contract at the end of the 2003–04 season and eventually signed a one-year contract extension.

At the start of the 2004–05 season, Elliott started the season well when he scored his first goal of the season, in a 2–2 draw against Walsall on 10 August 2004. However, Elliott suffered a toe injury and was substituted in the 26th minute, as AFC Bournemouth won 1–0 against Wrexham on 28 August 2004. Initially out for four to six weeks, he returned to the starting line–up, in a 1–0 win against Sheffield Wednesday on 18 September 2004. Following his return, Elliott regained his first team place under the management of Sean O'Driscoll. Along the way, he also began to assists goals for the club and registered thirteen assists across the league season. Elliott scored his second goal of the season, in a 3–1 loss against Barnsley on 30 October 2004. He then made his 200th appearances for AFC Bournemouth, in a 1–1 draw against Sheffield Wednesday on 15 January 2005. Elliott scored three more goals later in the 2004–05 season, winning all three matches. In his last season at the club, he played fifty–two games and scored five goals in all competitions.

=== Burnley ===
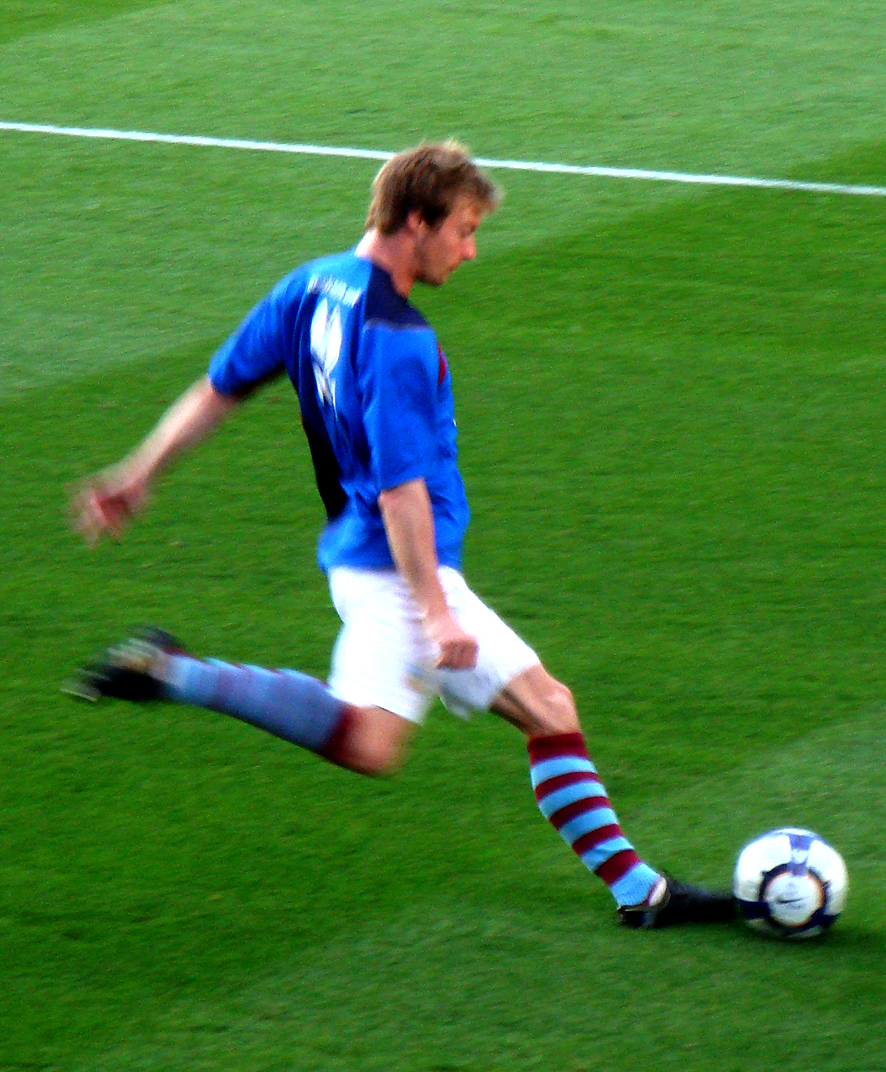
Elliott warming up in 2009.

With his and teammate Garreth O'Connor's contracts due to expire, the pair signed three-year contracts with Burnley, a team which he had impressed in an FA Cup-tie that season. Upon joining the club, Elliott, along with O'Connor, both said the move was too good to turn down and wanted to play in the higher level.

He made his Burnley debut, starting the match, in a 2–1 loss against Crewe Alexandra in the opening game of the season. After the match, his performance was praised by the Lancashire Telegraph, saying: "The number of debutants at Crewe, the pick of them being Wade Elliott - good pace, tricky feet and the ability to beat a man." However, during a 4–0 win against Coventry City on 13 August 2005, he suffered an ankle injury and was substituted in the 12th minute. After being out for four weeks, Elliott made return to the starting line–up against Cardiff City on 10 September 2005 and scored his first goals, in a 3–3 draw. After the match, manager Steve Cotterill praised his performance. Following his return from injury, he found himself, rotating between the starting line–up and substitute bench. This was due to Cotterill's concern of letting Elliott play 90 minutes following his injury and didn't play the whole game for two months. At times when Elliott was fit, he began to play in the right–back position. Elliott's first season at Burnley got off to a slow start; he made just 23 starts for the club and scored 3 goals. Reflecting on his slow start at Burnley, Elliott said: "I had a dodgy start with my ankle and I've been grateful the games have come thick and fast in the past few weeks because being out meant I lost a bit of sharpness. I was under no illusions when I came to Burnley that every game would be a new challenge and I feel I've had to fight for every little bit of play."

At the start of the 2006–07 season, Elliott continued to find himself, rotating between the starting line–up and substitute bench. But he soon won his first team place, playing in the midfield position and at times in the right–back position. performance alongside Steve Jones were praised by manager Cotterill for their "all-round good team play". Elliott then scored his first goal of the season, in a 1–1 draw against Sheffield Wednesday on 10 February 2007. After missing one match due to suspension, he scored on his return and set up the opening goal of the game, in a 4–0 win against Plymouth Argyle on 3 April 2007. Elliott later scored two more goals later in the 2006–07 season, coming against Norwich City and Sunderland. He finished his second season at Burnley, making forty–four appearances and scoring four times in all competitions. For his performance, Elliott won several awards at the club's award ceremony, including Burnley's Player of the Year. Reflecting on his performance, columnist Andy Lochhead said about Elliott's performance: "He is a decent player and one of the highlights of this season was his spectacular goal at Sunderland. Next season I'd like to see him take a few more people on and get beyond them to supply more crosses into the strikers and give them ammunition."

In the 2007–08 season, Elliott became a regular first team starter at Burnley and became one of the club's most influential players. He said about aiming for a first team starting place for Burnley ahead of the new season. Elliott began to assists in a number of matches for the club throughout the 2007–08 season and registered thirteen assists across the league season. But both managers Cotterill and Owen Coyle reiterated the player by encouraging him to score more goals, due to being "one of those old-fashioned wide right players" and capabilities of "striking good ball". In response, he agreed with both manager's suggestions, but nevertheless "pleased with how it's gone so far." Elliott then made his 100th appearance for Burnley against Preston North End on 15 December 2007 and set up the opening goal of the game, in a 3–2 loss. His performance led the club opened a contract talks with the player, as local newspaper the Lancashire Telegraph described him as "the wing wizard", who's "enjoying one of this best ever seasons at Turf Moor." He finally scored his first goal for Burnley in eleven month, described the goal by the club's official website as "a second half piledriver", in a 1–0 win against Charlton Athletic on 11 March 2008. On 27 March 2008, Elliott committed his future to Burnley by signing a three-year contract extension, keeping him at the club until the end of the 2011 season. Two days later on 29 March 2008, he scored his second goal of the season, in a 2–1 win against Barnsley. At the end of the 2007–08 season, Elliott made forty–eight appearances and scoring two times in all competitions. For his performance, he won Burnley's Player of the Year awards for two consecutive seasons.

Ahead of the 2008–09 season, Burnley's assistant manager Sandy Stewart believed that Elliott will get more better, due to setting "very high standards for himself" during the club's pre–season. He continued to instrumental in Burnley's first team, playing in the midfield positions. Elliott scored his first goal of the season and set up one of the goals, in a 3–2 win against Watford on 30 September 2008. However, in a match against Doncaster Rovers on 22 November 2008, he suffered a groin injury and was substituted in the 34th minute, as the club drew 0–0. Elliott made his return from injury against Sheffield United on 6 December 2008, starting in the right–back position, and helped Burnley win 3–2. Following his return, he said the club won't risk taking their strong position for granted in determination to make the play–offs. However between in late–December and January, Elliott was out on two separate occasions due to injury and suspension. Following his return, he continuously rotate playing in the right–back position and midfield position. Elliott then scored his second goal of the season, scoring a "superb, dipping volley", in a FA Cup fourth round replay 3–1 win against West Bromwich Albion on 3 February 2009. After the match, he successfully predicted about his aim to play in the Wembley Stadium. The following month, Elliott scored two goals in two matches between 14 March 2009 and 17 March 2009 against Nottingham Forest and Ipswich Town. On the last game of the season against Bristol City, he scored "a deflected 20-yard shot" and set up the opening goal of the game, in a 4–0 win to help Burnley earn a place in the Championship play-offs. However, Elliott suffered an injury and missed the first leg match against Reading. But he was able to return in the starting line–up in the second leg and helped the club win 2–0 to reach the final. Elliott was instrumental in Burnley's promotion to the Premier League and capped off the season by scoring the only goal in the play-off final. The 25-yard (23 m) curling shot captured much media attention with multiple references to him scoring the goal that had the potential to earn Burnley up to £60 million in the Premier League. After the match, he dedicated to his father, who was suffering from a throat cancer, and was the inspiration for the goal. At the end of the 2008–09 season, Elliott made fifty–six appearances and scoring six times in all competitions.

In the opening game of the 2009–10 season, Elliott made his Premier League debut against Stoke City and started the match, in a 2–0 loss. In a follow–up match against defending champions Manchester United, he set up a goal for Robbie Blake, who scored the only goal of the game, in a 1–0 win, which was Burnley's first home game in the top flight of English football for 33 years. In a follow–up match, Elliott scored the only goal in the home win against Everton. Being referred as a "latecomer to professional football, nevermind the Premier League" by local newspaper Lancashire Telegraph, he enjoyed playing in the Premier League, playing against the likes of Ryan Giggs, Tim Cahill, Frank Lampard and Steven Gerrard. Elliott began playing in the attacking midfield position since the club began playing in the Premier League. In the East Lancashire derby against Blackburn Rovers on 18 October 2009, he set up the opening goal of the game for Robbie Blake once again, in a 3–2 loss. During the match, however, Elliott was involved in an incident after he allegedly kicked Pascal Chimbonda's head, but faced no actions by the FA. Elliott made his 400th league appearance in his professional football career, in a 5–3 loss against West Ham United on 28 November 2009. Two weeks later on 12 December 2009, he scored his second Premier League goal, from "a cracking right-foot volley", in a 1–1 draw against Fulham. On his 200th League appearance for Burnley, Elliott scored the final goal in a 4–1 defeat of Hull City from an inswinging free kick on the far left at the KC Stadium. Two weeks later on 25 April 2010, the club were relegated to the Championship after losing 4–0 against Liverpool. On the last game of the season, he scored and set up one of the goals, in a 4–2 win against Tottenham Hotspur. At the end of the 2009–10 season, having played all thirty–league matches, Elliott made forty appearances and scoring four times in all competitions.

Ahead of the 2010–11 season, Elliott was linked a move away from Burnley, as Bolton Wanderers were interested in signing him and a chance to be reunited with Owen Coyle. However the following month, Bolton Wanderers ended their interest in signing him when they opted to sign Martin Petrov. In the opening game of the 2010–11 season against Nottingham Forest, he set up a goal for Chris Iwelumo to score the only goal of the game to give the club their first win back in the Championship. Elliott continued to be in a first team regular in the midfield position, forming a three–way partnership with Jack Cork and Dean Marney, and at times, played in a right–back position. On 21 September 2010, he scored his first goal of the season, scoring from a volley, in a 1–0 win against Bolton Wanderers in the third round of the League Cup. After Clarke Carlisle was sent–off during a match against Millwall on 2 October 2010, Elliott captained Burnley for the rest of the game, in a 1–1 draw. He captained the club in the next three matches against Sheffield United, Barnsley and Reading, earning a total of four points. Since the start of the 2010–11 season, Elliott appeared in every matches for Burnley until he was dropped to the substitute bench for two matches. But he made his return against Preston North End on 26 February 2011 and set up a goal for Cork, who scored a winning goal, in a 2–1 win. Elliott then scored two goals in two matches between 19 April 2011 and 23 April 2011 against Middlesbrough and Derby County. On 12 May 2011, he signed a two–year contract extension with the club, keeping him until 2013. At the end of the 2010–11 season, Elliott made fifty appearances and scoring three times in all competitions.

In the 2011–12 season, Elliott scored the only goal of the season for Burnley, in a 3–2 win against Barnet in the second round of the League Cup. By the time he left the club, Elliott made six appearances and scoring once in all competitions. By the end of August, he was linked with a move to Nottingham Forest and Birmingham City.

=== Birmingham City ===
Elliott joined Championship club Birmingham City on 31 August 2011, the last day of the summer transfer window; he signed a two-year contract for an undisclosed fee. Upon joining the club, Elliott said it was time to leave Burnley and refuted claims that he had a fallen out with manager Eddie Howe, pointing out that they were teammates at Bournemouth.

Elliott made his Birmingham City debut as a second-half substitute in a 3–0 home victory against Millwall. and scored his first goal for the club against Maribor in the Europa League on 29 September. Both manager Chris Hughton and local newspaper Birmingham Mail spoke highly about Elliott's start to his Birmingham City's career, describing him as a "the perfect employee". However, he struggled to hold down a first team place, due to strong competitions in the midfield positions and at times, placed in a second striker role. Amid to his first team opportunities, Elliott scored two FA Cup goals in January against Wolverhampton Wanderers and Sheffield United that send the club through to the fifth round. After the match, he became Birmingham City's fan favourite. Elliott's first league goal came on 13 March 2012 in a 3–1 defeat away to Leicester City, scored from the penalty spot after Sol Bamba brought down Nikola Žigić. He scored his second league goal for the club on the last game of the season, in a 2–0 win against Reading, scoring from the penalty spot after a handball from Jay Tabb and had also miss a penalty earlier in the game. In his first season at Birmingham City, Elliott made forty appearances and scoring five times in all competitions.

In the first match of the 2012–13 season, Elliott scored his first goal of the season, in a 5–1 win against Barnet in the first round of the League Cup. He scored his third league goal came in a win against Peterborough United on 1 September; the goal was originally credited as an own goal when goalkeeper Bobby Olejnik punched Elliott's free kick into his own net, but was later awarded to Elliott. Since the start of the 2012–13 season, he continued to remain in the first team, playing in various midfield positions. Elliott scored a winning goal against Middlesbrough on 30 November 2012 when he "chested down a defensive clearance on the edge of the penalty area and hit a dipping volley above the goalkeeper's hands". Elliott scored two goals in both FA Cup matches against Leeds United, as Birmingham City loss 2–1 in the replay (he later won the club's Goal of the Season). Elliott scored a last minute equalising goal against Charlton Athletic on 9 February 2013, scoring from Chris Burke's cross. On 1 April 2013, he scored twice late in the game from the penalty spot – the second from the rebound after the penalty was saved – losing 3–2 against Wolverhampton Wanderers. Two weeks later on 16 April 2013 against Bristol City, Elliott scored the only goal of the game, in a 1–0 win. His performances throughout the 2012–13 season led manager Lee Clark praising him, stating that he had "been really good in terms of playing a few different positions". At the end of the 2012–13 season, Elliott made forty–seven appearances and scoring seven times in all competitions. On 24 June 2013, he signed a one-year contract extension with the club.

At the start of the 2013–14 season, Elliott made eight starts for Birmingham City in the first two months to the season. However, he suffered a calf injury in early–October that saw him out for two matches. Elliott returned to the starting line–up, in a 4–0 loss against Leeds United on 17 October 2013. However, his return was short–lived on 29 October 2013 when he was sent off for elbowing an opponent just before half-time with the club a goal down to Premier League Stoke City in the League Cup; the ten men came back to draw 4–4 after extra time but lost the penalty shootout. Elliott returned from the resulting three-match suspension to make his 100th appearance for Birmingham City, as a second-half substitute in a 3–0 win at Barnsley on 30 November. By the time he left the club for Bristol City. Elliott made eighteen appearances in all competitions.

After a spell on loan at Bristol City, Elliott was released. He finished his Birmingham career at the age of 35, having scored 14 goals in 105 appearances in all competitions.

=== Bristol City ===
After not featuring regularly in Birmingham's starting eleven, Elliott joined League One club Bristol City on 28 January 2014 on a one-month loan. He made his debut the same day, as a half-time substitute at Brentford with his new team already 3–1 behind, and was booked early in the half for a poor tackle. Elliott went on to impress manager Steve Cotterill, who admitted that he had "[thrown] him in too soon after not playing regular first team football since October", and Elliott's loan was extended to the end of the season. He then scored his first goal for the club, in a 2–1 loss against Rotherham United on 29 March 2014. In a follow–up match against Preston North End, Elliott scored an equalising goal, in a 1–1 draw. Two weeks later on 21 April 2014, he scored his third goal for Bristol City, in a 3–0 win against Stevenage. At the end of the 2013–14 season, Elliott made nineteen appearances and scoring three times in all competitions.

After his release from Birmingham, Elliott joined Bristol City on a one-year permanent contract. Cotterill appointed him the club's captain, describing him as "a stand-out candidate" who "offers a great deal of honesty, integrity and leadership." His first game after signing for Bristol City on a permanent basis came in the opening game of the 2014–15 season against Sheffield United and scored a winning goal, in a 2–1 win. On 27 September 2014, he, once again, scored a winning goal, in a 3–2 win against Milton Keynes Dons. However, in a match against Swindon Town on 15 November 2014, Elliott received a straight red card in the 3rd minute after he "clashed with Jack Stephens in a heated opening", as Bristol City loss 1–0. After the club, the club appealed about Elliott's red card but the FA upheld the ban. He returned to the starting line–up against Crawley Town on 13 December 2014 and helped Bristol City won 1–0. Elliott led his side to the "lower-league double" of the Football League Trophy and League One title. At the end of the 2014–15 season, he made forty–one appearances and scoring two times in all competitions.

Following this, Elliott then announced his retirement as a player to take up coaching.

== Coaching career ==
Towards the end of his football career, Elliott began taking football courses in hopes of obtaining UEFA coaching badges. He took up the post of under-21s manager at Bristol City at the end of the 2014–15 season. In January 2016, after Steve Cotterill was sacked, assistant manager John Pemberton and Elliott were named as an interim management team; their first game in charge was a 1–0 victory over league leaders Middlesbrough. He left the club at the end of the season following a reorganisation of the coaching structure under new manager Lee Johnson.

In October 2016, Elliott was announced as the new assistant Academy manager at Forest Green Rovers. Elliott was appointed assistant manager of Stoke City U23s in April 2017. He became manager of the team in January 2018 following the departure of Glyn Hodges, but reverted to assistant to Kevin Russell for the 2018–19 season.

=== Cheltenham Town ===
Elliot joined Cheltenham Town as a coach in September 2020. Elliott was promoted to the role of head coach in June 2022 following the departure of Michael Duff. His first managerial match as the club's manager came on 30 July 2022, in a 3–2 loss against Peterborough United. Results began to improve in October and November that saw Cheltenham Town go unbeaten league run to five games. He led the club to their first ever EFL Trophy semi-final, beating Salford City before bowing out to Plymouth Argyle 3–2 on penalties. Having helped Cheltenham Town collect eleven points from five games in March, Elliott was nominated for Sky Bet League One Manager of the Month Award. He helped the club finish seventeenth place in League One in his first season as a manager.

Ahead of the 2023–24 season, Cheltenham Town signed thirteen players and let go of their key players, including Ryan Jackson and Alfie May. Following a difficult start to the 2023–24 season that saw his side pick up just one point from eight league matches without scoring, he departed the club on 20 September 2023.

== Personal life ==
Growing up supporting Southampton, Elliott idolised Matt Le Tissier and joked about his playing similarity when compared the two. He is good friend with former teammate Brian Stock, having known each other since childhood and played together at AFC Bournemouth. Elliott said he's a regular reader and credited his family for introducing him to reading.

Elliott was a fan favourite with AFC Bournemouth's supporters that they wrote a song about him called "The Ballad of Wade Elliott". During his playing career, he partook in charity work and local communities. Elliott is a regular user of Twitter. Elliott separated from his partner in 2019. They share one son together

== Career statistics ==
Appearances and goals by club, season and competition
Club	Season	League			FA Cup		League Cup		Other		Total	
Club	Season	Division	Apps	Goals	Apps	Goals	Apps	Goals	Apps	Goals	Apps	Goals
Bashley	1997–98	Southern League Southern Div.	12	0	0	0	4 (Note: Appearances in Southern League Cup)	0	0	0	16	0
Bashley	1998–99	Southern League Southern Div.	32	0	0	0	6	1	3 (Note: One appearance in FA Trophy, two in Hampshire Senior Cup)	0	41	1
Bashley	1999–2000	Southern League Eastern Div.	24	0	2	0	1	0	4 (Note: Three appearances and two goals in FA Trophy, one appearance in Hampshire Senior Cup)	2	31	2
Bashley	Total		68	0	2	0	11	1	7	2	88	3
AFC Bournemouth	1999–2000	Football League Second Div.	12	3	—		—		—		12	3
AFC Bournemouth	2000–01	Football League Second Div.	36	9	3	2	1	0	1 (Note: Appearances in Football League Trophy)	0	41	11
AFC Bournemouth	2001–02	Football League Second Div.	46	8	2	0	1	0	1	0	50	8
AFC Bournemouth	2002–03	Football League Third Div.	44	4	6	1	1	0	7 (Note: Four appearances and one goal in Football League Trophy, three appearances in Third Division play-offs)	1	58	6
AFC Bournemouth	2003–04	Football League Second Div.	39	3	3	1	1	0	1	0	44	4
AFC Bournemouth	2004–05	League One	43	4	5	1	3	0	1	0	52	5
AFC Bournemouth	Total		220	31	19	5	7	0	11	1	257	37
Burnley	2005–06	Championship	36	3	1	0	1	0	—		38	3
Burnley	2006–07	Championship	42	4	1	0	1	0	—		44	4
Burnley	2007–08	Championship	46	2	1	0	1	0	—		48	2
Burnley	2008–09	Championship	42	4	5	1	7	0	2 (Note: Appearances in Championship play-offs)	1	56	6
Burnley	2009–10	Premier League	38	4	2	0	0	0	—		40	4
Burnley	2010–11	Championship	44	2	3	0	3	1	—		50	3
Burnley	2011–12	Championship	4	0	—		2	1	—		6	1
Burnley	Total		252	19	13	1	15	2	2	1	282	23
Birmingham City	2011–12	Championship	29	2	5	2	—		6 (Note: Five appearances and one goal in UEFA Europa League, one appearance in Championship play-offs)	1	40	5
Birmingham City	2012–13	Championship	44	6	2	2	1	1	—		47	9
Birmingham City	2013–14	Championship	15	0	1	0	2	0	—		18	0
Birmingham City	Total		88	8	8	4	3	1	6	1	105	14
Bristol City (loan)	2013–14	League One	19	3	—		—		—		19	3
Bristol City	2014–15	League One	36	2	2	0	—		4	0	42	2
Bristol City	Total		55	5	2	0	—		4	0	61	5
Career totals			683	63	44	10	36	4	30	5	793	82

== Managerial statistics ==
As of match played 19 September 2023

Managerial record by team and tenure
Team	From	To	Record				
Team	From	To	P	W	D	L	Win %
Cheltenham Town	1 July 2022	20 September 2023	65	18	15	32	27.7
Total			65	18	15	32	27.7

== Honours ==
=== As a player ===
Bournemouth

- Football League Third Division play-offs: 2003

Burnley

- Football League Championship play-offs: 2009

Bristol City

- Football League One: 2014–15
- Football League Trophy: 2014–15

Individual

- Goal of the Season's North West Football Awards: 2008

=== As a coach ===
Cheltenham Town

- EFL League Two: 2020–21
