= Stephen Purches =

English footballer (born 1980)

Personal information
- Full name: Stephen Robert Purches
- Date of birth: 14 January 1980 (age 46)
- Place of birth: Ilford, London, England
- Position: Defender

Senior career*
Years	Team	Apps	(Gls)
1998–2000	West Ham United	0	(0)
2000–2007	AFC Bournemouth	241	(10)
2007–2010	Leyton Orient	110	(5)
2010–2014	AFC Bournemouth	33	(0)
Total		384	(18)

Managerial career
- 2013–2017: AFC Bournemouth Under-21s
- 2017–2020: AFC Bournemouth (first team coach)
- 2020–2021: AFC Bournemouth (assistant manager)
- 2021–2026: Newcastle United (first team coach)
- * Club domestic league appearances and goals

Stephen Robert Purches (born 14 January 1980) is an English football coach and former player

A former professional footballer, he made more than 400 appearances during a 16 year playing career which included two spells at AFC Bournemouth and as captain of Leyton Orient.

== Playing career ==
Purches was a versatile performer who could operate across both defence and midfield.

He joined West Ham United at the age of ten and progressed through the academy ranks, playing in the same squad as future England internationals like Rio Ferdinand, Michael Carrick, Joe Cole and Frank Lampard, before signing his first professional contract under manager Harry Redknapp.

Although Purches did not make a competitive appearance for the first team, he was on the bench against Steaua Bucharest during their 1999–2000 UEFA Cup campaign.

At the age of 20, he was signed by manager Mel Machin for AFC Bournemouth, who were then in Division Two. After the opening game of the 2000–01 season, Purches was already working under his second manager after Sean O'Driscoll took over from Machin, who became the club's director of football. In his first season, Purches was a key player along with former teammate Jermain Defoe, on loan from West Ham, as Bournemouth narrowly missed out on reaching the Division Two play-offs, surrendering a 3–1 lead to draw 3–3 against Reading, with Purches denied a winning goal by a goal line clearance in the closing minutes.

Purches scored his first goals for the club in 2001–02 during a 3–1 home win against Stoke City and a 5–1 home victory against Northampton Town. In May 2003, Purches scored at the Millennium Stadium as the Cherries triumphed 5–2 against Lincoln City in the Division Three play-off final, ensuring an immediate return to the third tier of English football following relegation in 2002. During the 2004–05 season, Purches and Bournemouth again narrowly missed out on reaching the League One play-offs, drawing 2–2 at home on the final day of the season against Hartlepool United, who took the final play-off place instead.

In the summer of 2007, after seven years with Bournemouth, missing just three league games, Purches chose to turn down the offer of a new contract to join League One side Leyton Orient on a free transfer. Having grown up watching some of his first football matches at Brisbane Road, he described his move as "like coming home" and was also handed the captaincy by manager Martin Ling. During the 2008–09 season, he scored winning goals away at MK Dons on 27 January 2009 and at home against Crewe Alexandra on 14 February 2009. After 132 appearances in all competitions, Purches left Orient in June 2010 following the conclusion of his contract and returned to Bournemouth, who had just been promoted to League One, being lured back by his former teammate Eddie Howe, who had since become the manager.

Howe left halfway through Purches' first season back at Bournemouth to become manager of Burnley, being replaced by Lee Bradbury, as the team reached the League One play-off semi finals. In January 2012, following a string of impressive performances in central midfield, Purches was rewarded with a new two-year contract. Just a month later, however, Purches suffered a double fracture of his right leg during a match against Rochdale. In December 2012, it was announced Purches would be awarded a testimonial match by Bournemouth, after a combined 10 years' worth of service to the club.

The testimonial took place during pre-season ahead of the 2013–14 season, with his former club West Ham the opposition. Purches, who was still continuing his recovery from a broken leg, came on in the second half as the Hammers won 2–0. Purches' final appearance as a player was in a pre-season friendly on 21 July 2013, coming on as a late second-half substitute against a Real Madrid team containing Cristiano Ronaldo, Luka Modrić and Mesut Özil in what was Carlo Ancelotti's first game in charge.

On 19 May 2014, Purches announced his retirement from playing football due to injury and moved into coaching.

== Coaching career ==
During his recovery from injury, Purches was appointed player-coach in charge of the Cherries' Development Squad and Under 21s in July 2013 by Eddie Howe, who had since returned to the club as manager.

Purches took the job on full-time following his retirement from playing and helped nurture the talents of some of the club's rising stars including Sam Surridge, Gavin Kilkenny, Harry Cornick, Baily Cargill and Jack Simpson, who all appeared for the first team, as Bournemouth would go on to experience the most successful period in their history.

In 2016, Purches' Bournemouth development squad were crowned champions of the Final Third Development League (Central League) South.

In February 2017, Purches was promoted to the position of first-team coach at Bournemouth during their second season in the Premier League, which ended with the club recording their highest-ever league finish of ninth.

In the summer of 2018, Purches earned the prestigious FA UEFA Pro Licence, the highest level of the FA's coaching badges

In August 2020, following the appointment of Jason Tindall as Bournemouth manager, Purches was announced as the club's new assistant manager. Despite Tindall departing in February 2021, Purches remained in his role when Jonathan Woodgate took over managerial responsibilities, adding Joe Jordan and Gary O'Neil as first team coaches. They worked together for the remainder of the season as Bournemouth reached the Championship play offs. They were eventually beaten over two legs in the semi final by Brentford, who would win the final and promotion to the Premier League.

After 11 years as a coach and player, and 18 years in total over two spells, Purches left Bournemouth in June 2021, when Scott Parker was installed as the club's new manager.

Following Eddie Howe's appointment as Newcastle United head coach, Purches joined his coaching staff as first team coach in November 2021, with Newcastle having recorded their lowest ever Premier League points tally at that point of the season. The team went on to finish in 11th position.

In their first full season at St James' Park, in 2022–23, the team finished fourth in the Premier League, qualifying for the Champions League for the first time since the 2002–03 season, and reached the 2023 EFL Cup final.

== Career statistics ==
Club	Season	Division	League		National Cup		League Cup		Other		Total	
Club	Season	Division	Apps	Goals	Apps	Goals	Apps	Goals	Apps	Goals	Apps	Goals
AFC Bournemouth	2000–01	Second Division	34	0	2	0	2	0	0	0	38	0
AFC Bournemouth	2001–02	Second Division	41	2	2	0	1	0	0	0	44	2
AFC Bournemouth	2002–03	Third Division	41	3	6	0	1	0	6	2	52	5
AFC Bournemouth	2003–04	Second Division	42	3	3	0	1	0	1	0	47	3
AFC Bournemouth	2004–05	League One	14	1	2	0	0	0	0	0	16	1
AFC Bournemouth	2005–06	League One	26	0	0	0	0	0	2	0	28	0
AFC Bournemouth	2006–07	League One	43	1	2	0	1	0	1	0	47	1
AFC Bournemouth	Total		241	10	17	0	6	0	10	2	274	12
Leyton Orient	2007–08	League One	37	1	2	0	0	0	1	0	40	1
Leyton Orient	2008–09	League One	42	3	3	0	1	0	1	0	47	3
Leyton Orient	2009–10	League One	31	1	2	0	2	0	0	0	35	1
Leyton Orient	Total		110	5	7	0	3	0	2	0	122	5
AFC Bournemouth	2010–11	League One	9	0	2	0	1	0	1	0	13	0
AFC Bournemouth	2011–12	League One	24	0	2	1	1	0	3	0	30	1
AFC Bournemouth	2012–13	League One	0	0	0	0	0	0	0	0	0	0
AFC Bournemouth	2013–14	Championship	0	0	0	0	0	0	0	0	0	0
AFC Bournemouth	Total		33	0	4	1	2	0	4	0	43	1
Career total			384	15	28	1	11	0	16	2	439	18

== Honours ==
AFC Bournemouth

- Football League Third Division play-offs: 2003
