= Neil Moss (footballer) =

English footballer

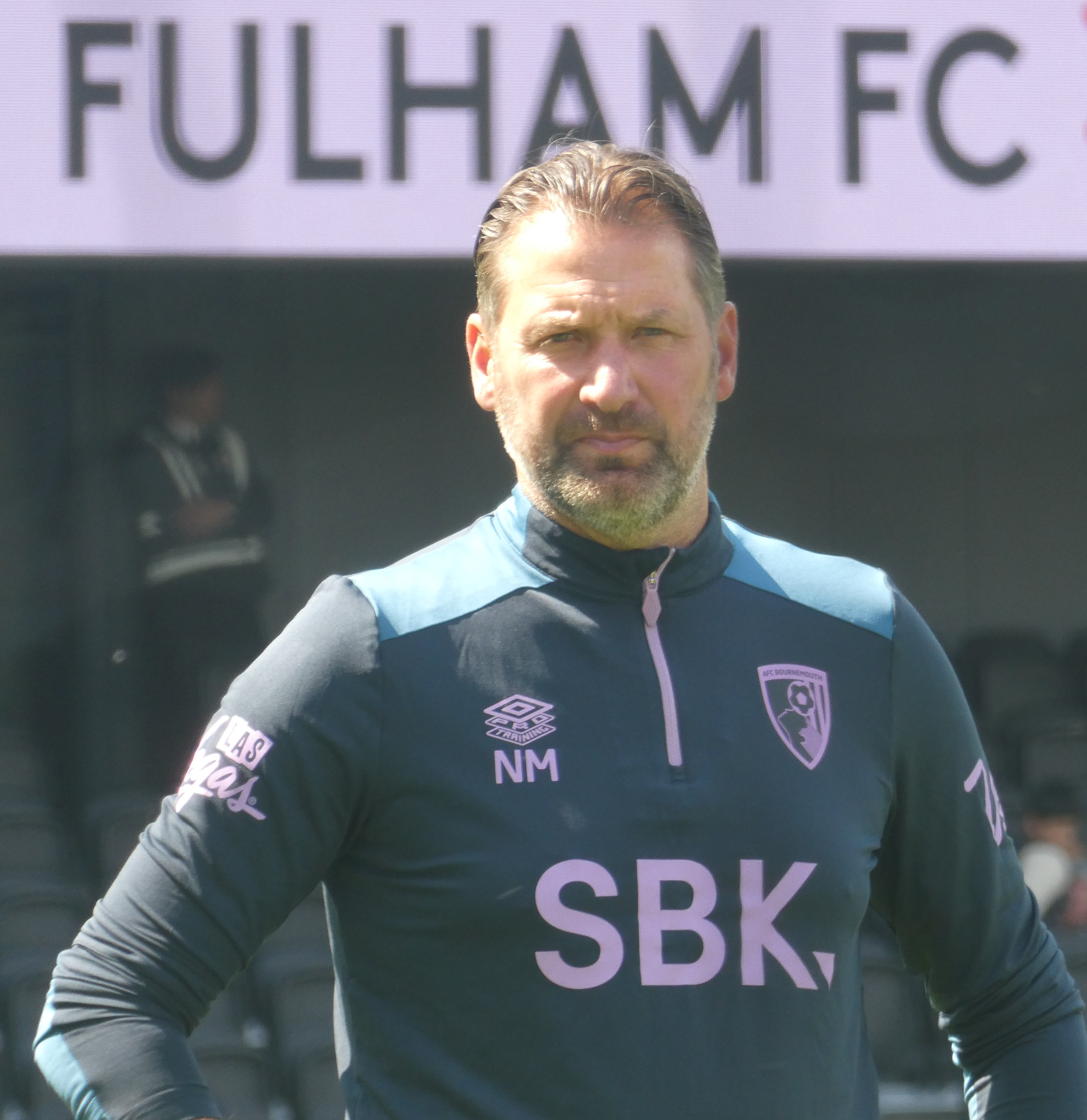
- Neil Moss in 2026

Personal information
- Full name: Neil Graham Moss
- Date of birth: 10 May 1975 (age 51)
- Place of birth: New Milton, England
- Position: Goalkeeper

Youth career
- 1992–1993: AFC Bournemouth

Senior career*
Years	Team	Apps	(Gls)
1993–1995	AFC Bournemouth	22	(0)
1995–2003	Southampton	24	(0)
1997	→ Gillingham (loan)	10	(0)
2002	→ AFC Bournemouth (loan)	14	(0)
2003–2008	AFC Bournemouth	150	(0)
Total		220	(0)
- * Club domestic league appearances and goals

Neil Graham Moss (born 10 May 1975 in New Milton, Hampshire) is a retired footballer who last played as a goalkeeper for AFC Bournemouth.

== Playing career ==
Moss started his career at AFC Bournemouth as a trainee in May 1992 and signed his first professional contract with the club in January 1993. He moved to Southampton in December 1995 for a fee of £250,000, where he proved to be a reliable, steady goalkeeper but was unable to displace Paul Jones or Antti Niemi as first choice goalkeeper. After only making 22 starts in eight years, he returned to Bournemouth in February 2003.

Moss is well known as a lifelong Bournemouth supporter – he used to watch the team play from the terraces before signing for the club.

During Bournemouth's 1–0 home victory against Millwall on 17 March 2007, Moss was in the net in the South Stand, where the Millwall fans were, and he had over 30 coins (totalling around £5) thrown at him. In an interview with BBC Radio 5 Live two days later, he revealed that he had escaped from the incident unhurt.

Due to a long-standing wrist injury which failed to heal sufficiently, Moss announced his immediate retirement on 14 July 2008.

== Coaching career ==
Moss currently runs a goalkeeping coaching company, which he set up in 2007.

Moss is now goalkeeping coach for Bournemouth, having signed for the 2009–10 season.

== Career statistics ==
=== Club ===
Appearances and goals by club, season and competition
Club	Season	League			FA Cup		League Cup		Other		Total	
Club	Season	Division	Apps	Goals	Apps	Goals	Apps	Goals	Apps	Goals	Apps	Goals
Southampton
Southampton	1996–97	Premier League	3	0	0	0	2	0	—		5	0
Southampton	1998–99	Premier League	7	0	0	0	0	0	—		7	0
Southampton	1999–2000	Premier League	9	0	0	0	0	0	—		9	0
Southampton	2000–01	Premier League	3	0	1	0	0	0	—		4	0
Southampton	2001–02	Premier League	2	0	0	0	0	0	—		2	0
Southampton	Total		24	0	1	0	2	0	0	0	27	0
Gillingham (loan)	1997–98	Second Division	10	0	0	0	2	0	—		12	0
Bournemouth (loan)	2002–03	Third Division	14	0	2	0	0	0	3 (Note: Appearance(s) in Football League Trophy)	0	19	0
Bournemouth	2002–03	Third Division	20	0	0	0	0	0	2 (Note: Appearances in Third Division play-off appearances)	0	22	0
Bournemouth	2003–04	Second Division	46	0	3	0	1	0	—		50	0
Bournemouth	2004–05	League One	46	0	5	0	3	0	—		54	0
Bournemouth	2005–06	League One	4	0	0	0	0	0	2	0	6	0
Bournemouth	2006–07	League One	27	0	3	0	1	0	1	0	32	0
Bournemouth	2007–08	League One	7	0	1	0	1	0	2	0	11	0
Bournemouth	Total		164	0	14	0	6	0	10	0	194	0
Career total			198	0	15	0	8	0	10	0	231	0

== Honours ==
AFC Bournemouth

- Football League Third Division play-offs: 2003

Individual

- PFA Fans' Player of the Year: 2003–04 Second Division
