= 1997–98 Gillingham F.C. season =

English football club season

Gillingham
1997–98 season
- Chairman: Paul Scally
- Manager: Tony Pulis
- Second Division: 8th
- FA Cup: First round
- League Cup: First round
- League Trophy: First round
- Top goalscorer: League: Ade Akinbiyi (21); All: Ade Akinbiyi (22)
- Highest home attendance: 10,507 vs Fulham (28 March 1998)
- Lowest home attendance: 905 vs Peterborough United (9 November 1997)
Home colours	Away colours

During the 1997–98 English football season, Gillingham F.C. competed in the Football League Second Division, the third tier of the English football league system. It was the 66th season in which Gillingham competed in the Football League, and the 48th since the club was voted back into the league in 1950. The team started the season strongly and by the end of October were challenging for promotion, but then went on a lengthy run of games without a win which saw them slip into the bottom third of the league table in December. Results improved in the second half of the season, and Gillingham were sixth in the table with one game remaining, which would be sufficient for a place in the promotion play-offs. Results on the final day of the regular season meant that they finished in a four-way tie for the final two play-off places and missed out as they had scored the fewest goals of the four teams involved; a goalbound shot from Nicky Southall in the final seconds of the last game of the season which could have given Gillingham a win and a play-off place instead struck the goalpost and rebounded away.

Gillingham also competed in three knock-out competitions, the FA Cup, Football League Cup, and Football League Trophy, but were eliminated in the first round of all three. The team played 51 competitive matches, winning 19, drawing 14, and losing 18. Ade Akinbiyi was the team's top goalscorer, with a total of 22 in all competitions. Paul Smith, a new signing at the start of the season, made the most appearances; he was the only player to play in all 51 games. The highest attendance recorded at the club's home ground, Priestfield Stadium, was 10,507 for a game against Fulham in March. The game was marred by fighting between rival supporters which resulted in a Fulham fan dying.

== Background and pre-season ==
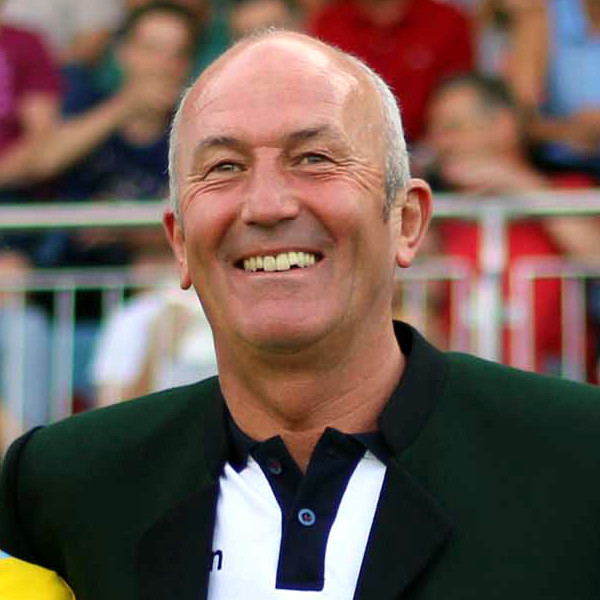
Gillingham manager Tony Pulis (pictured in 2014) was the club's manager for a third season.

The 1997–98 season was Gillingham's 66th in the Football League and the 48th since the club was elected back into the League in 1950 after being voted out in 1938. It was Gillingham's second consecutive season in the Football League Second Division, the third tier of the English football league system. The club had never reached the second level of English football in its history. Gillingham had finished the previous season in 11th place in the league table, six points below the promotion play-off places.

Tony Pulis served as manager for a third season, having been appointed in 1995 after chairman Paul Scally purchased the club. He signed several new players ahead of the new season, including three from fellow Second Division club Brentford: Paul Smith, a midfielder, who arrived for a transfer fee of £195,000 (equivalent to £450,000 in 2023), and Barry Ashby and Brian Statham, both defenders, who cost the club £140,000 (equivalent to £320,000 in 2023) and £10,000 (equivalent to £20,000 in 2023) respectively. Neil Masters, another defender, arrived from Wolverhampton Wanderers of the First Division for £50,000 (equivalent to £110,000 in 2023) and Neil Moss, a goalkeeper, joined on loan from Southampton of the FA Premier League to cover for Jim Stannard, who was injured during the pre-season. Another midfielder, Mick Galloway, who had spent part of the previous season on loan to Gillingham from Notts County, now joined the club on a permanent basis for £25,000 (equivalent to £60,000 in 2023) following County's relegation to the Third Division.

The club's first-choice kit consisted of blue shirts, shorts, and socks; the away kit, to be worn in the event of a clash of colours with the home team, was all-red. B.G. Foods of Sevenoaks signed a contract to become the club's new primary sponsor, meaning that their Kool brand appeared on the players' shirts. Gillingham prepared for the new season with a number of friendly matches, including games against Crystal Palace and Queens Park Rangers. Significant redevelopment work took place at the club's home ground, Priestfield Stadium, with the opening of a new grandstand on the Gordon Road side of the ground. For the first time in its 104-year history, Priestfield would also serve as the home ground of another team during the 1997–98 season. After being forced to leave the Goldstone Ground due to financial difficulties, Third Division Brighton & Hove Albion signed a two-year agreement to groundshare with Gillingham. Their opening home game on 16 August against Macclesfield Town was the first Football League match to take place at Priestfield without involving Gillingham.

== Second Division ==
=== August–December ===
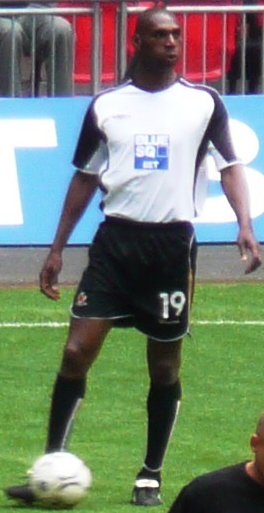
Leo Fortune-West (pictured in 2008) scored in three consecutive games in October and November but only scored one other goal in the whole season.

Gillingham's first Second Division game of the season was at home to Preston North End on 9 August; Ashby, Moss, Smith, and Masters all made their debuts. With the previous season's top goalscorer, Iffy Onoura, missing following a knee operation, Steve Butler was chosen to partner Ade Akinbiyi in the forward positions. The game resulted in a 0–0 draw, as did the next game away to Burnley a week later. Forward Leo Fortune-West came on as a substitute against Burnley but was sent off after less than ten minutes on the pitch. Jimmy Corbett, a 17-year-old attacking midfielder, made his debut as a substitute. The team's first win came on 23 August at home to Walsall; Statham made his debut. Gillingham lost both the last game of August and the first of September, after which they were 15th out of 24 teams in the league table, but wins at home to AFC Bournemouth and away to Bristol Rovers took them up to 9th.

Gillingham played five matches in October and won four of them, defeating Bristol City, Wycombe Wanderers, Wigan Athletic, and Plymouth Argyle; Akinbiyi scored twice in the first match of the month and once in each of the others, making him only the eighth Gillingham player to score in five consecutive Football League games. The victories meant that by the end of the month, Gillingham had climbed to fourth in the table, only two points off the two automatic promotion places. Fortune-West came on as a substitute and scored a goal in two consecutive games in October, after which he made his first start of the season and scored again, but he quickly lost his place again and did not start another game until March. Defender Mark Patterson, a £45,000 (equivalent to £100,000 in 2023) signing from Plymouth Argyle, made his debut in a 3–1 defeat to Millwall on 1 November, during which Statham was sent off. The match was the first in a run of ten Second Division games in which the team failed to achieve a victory. Gillingham ended November with a 3–0 defeat away to Fulham and a 2–0 loss at home to Grimsby Town, after which they were once again 15th in the table.

Nicky Southall, a new signing from Grimsby Town, made his debut against Southend United on 13 December and scored Gillingham's goal in a 2–1 defeat; he would go on to make nearly 400 appearances for Gillingham in four separate spells with the club. Another goalkeeper, Mike Pollitt, made his debut in the same game, having joined the club on loan from Notts County. On 26 December, Gillingham's run of games without a win extended to 10 games with a 4–0 defeat away to AFC Bournemouth, the first time the team had lost by as wide a margin since the previous December. Gillingham's Adrian Pennock was sent off in the defeat, which left the team 17th in the table, only four positions above the relegation places. Gillingham's final match of 1997 was at home to Brentford on 29 December; Akinbiyi scored twice in a 3–1 victory, the team's first win in more than two months. It meant that Gillingham ended the year 15th in the Second Division.

=== January–May ===
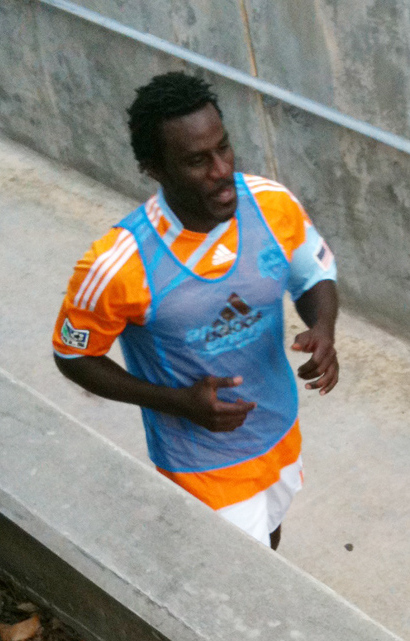
Ade Akinbiyi (pictured in 2009) scored two goals in a game on three occasions in the second half of the season.

Gillingham began 1998 with a second consecutive home victory, beating Burnley 2–0 on 3 January and rising to 12th in the table as a result. A week later they defeated Preston North End 3–1 to climb to 10th. On 8 February, Gillingham beat Watford, who were top of the table going into the game, 2–0 in a match which was broadcast live on Sky TV. Akinbiyi scored both goals, one in each half; goalkeeper Mark Walton, signed on loan from Fulham, made his debut. The transfer was initially processed as a loan due to a technicality and he was set to sign a permanent contract with Gillingham after the match against Watford, but the club refused to meet his salary request and he instead returned to Fulham. It was the first of four consecutive victories for Gillingham, all achieved without conceding a goal. After the fourth win, a 1–0 victory over Northampton Town on 24 February, Gillingham were 7th in the table.

Victory over Oldham Athletic on 3 March took Gillingham up to 6th in the table, putting them within the promotion play-off places, but they lost the next game 1–0 to Millwall and defender Guy Butters suffered a broken leg which would keep him out of the team for the rest of the season. On 21 March, Vince Bartram became the fourth loan goalkeeper to play for Gillingham during the season, joining the club from Arsenal following doubts over Stannard's fitness; Bartram's debut away to Blackpool resulted in a 2–0 defeat. A week later, Gillingham beat Fulham 2–0 at Priestfield with two goals from Akinbiyi. After the match, fans of the two teams fought outside the stadium; a Fulham supporter, Matthew Fox, was punched in the head by a Gillingham fan and died after falling and hitting his head on a kerb.

Gillingham drew three of the first four games of April, the other being a victory over Luton Town in which Akinbiyi again scored twice. After this run Gillingham were in 7th place, one position outside the play-off places, but victory over Plymouth Argyle on 25 April took them up to 6th with one game remaining. Gillingham's final match of the season at home to Wigan Athletic resulted in a 0–0 draw. The result, along with those of the day's other games, left Gillingham in a four-way tie with Bristol Rovers, Fulham, and Wrexham on 70 points; under Football League tiebreaker rules the teams were ranked in order of the total number of goals each had scored. Bristol Rovers and Fulham finished 5th and 6th respectively and clinched places in the play-offs, while Gillingham finished 8th as they had scored the fewest goals of the four teams. A shot by Southall struck the goalpost and rebounded away in the final minute of the game against Wigan; had he scored and his team held onto their lead for the remaining seconds, they would have qualified for the play-offs.

=== Match details ===
Key

- In result column, Gillingham's score shown first
- H = Home match
- A = Away match
- pen. = Penalty kick
- o.g. = Own goal

Results
Date	Opponents	Result	Goalscorers	Attendance
9 August 1997	Preston North End (H)	0–0		6,562
16 August 1997	Burnley (A)	0–0		11,811
23 August 1997	Walsall (H)	2–1	Smith, Akinbiyi	5,083
30 August 1997	York City (A)	1–2	Bailey	2,853
2 September 1997	Brentford (A)	0–2		4,903
5 September 1997	AFC Bournemouth (H)	2–1	Butters (pen.), Butler	5,168
13 September 1997	Bristol Rovers (A)	2–1	Butler, Akinbiyi	6,572
20 September 1997	Watford (H)	2–2	Butters, Butler	7,780
27 September 1997	Carlisle United (A)	1–2	Butters (pen.)	5,063
4 October 1997	Bristol City (H)	2–0	Akinbiyi (2)	6,277
11 October 1997	Wycombe Wanderers (H)	1–0	Akinbiyi	5,545
18 October 1997	Northampton Town (A)	1–2	Akinbiyi	7,191
21 October 1997	Wigan Athletic (A)	4–1	Akinbiyi, Ratcliffe, Butler (pen.), Fortune-West	3,214
25 October 1997	Plymouth Argyle (H)	2–1	Akinbiyi, Fortune-West	6,679
1 November 1997	Millwall (H)	1–3	Fortune-West	8,383
4 November 1997	Chesterfield (A)	1–1	Akinbiyi	3,420
7 November 1997	Oldham Athletic (A)	1–3	Butters	5,338
18 November 1997	Blackpool (H)	1–1	Butters (pen.)	5,045
21 November 1997	Fulham (A)	0–3		8,274
29 November 1997	Grimsby Town (H)	0–2		4,855
2 December 1997	Luton Town (A)	2–2	Akinbiyi (2)	4,408
13 December 1997	Southend United (H)	1–2	Southall	4,774
20 December 1997	Wrexham (A)	0–0		2,834
26 December 1997	AFC Bournemouth (A)	0–4		5,672
29 December 1997	Brentford (H)	3–1	Aspinall (o.g.), Akinbiyi (2)	5,908
3 January 1998	Burnley (H)	2–0	Butler, Smith	5,886
10 January 1998	Preston North End (A)	3–1	Butters, Galloway, Onuora	7,776
17 January 1998	York City (H)	0–0		5,891
31 January 1998	Bristol Rovers (H)	1–1	Onuora	5,593
8 February 1998	Watford (A)	2–0	Akinbiyi (2)	10,498
14 February 1998	Bristol City (A)	2–0	Corbett, Southall	11,781
21 February 1998	Carlisle United (H)	1–0	Butler	6,270
24 February 1998	Northampton Town (H)	1–0	Butters (pen.)	6,463
28 February 1998	Wycombe Wanderers (A)	0–1		5,583
3 March 1998	Oldham Athletic (H)	2–1	Kelly (o.g.), Akinbiyi	5,254
7 March 1998	Millwall (A)	0–1		8,241
14 March 1998	Chesterfield (H)	1–0	Corbett	5,672
21 March 1998	Blackpool (A)	1–2	Fortune-West	4,165
28 March 1998	Fulham (H)	2–0	Akinbiyi (2)	10,507
31 March 1998	Walsall (A)	0–1		3,117
4 April 1998	Grimsby Town (A)	0–0		5,190
11 April 1998	Luton Town (H)	2–1	Akinbiyi (2)	6,846
13 April 1998	Southend United (A)	0–0		6,151
18 April 1998	Wrexham (H)	1–1	Akinbiyi	7,869
25 April 1998	Plymouth Argyle (A)	1–0	Smith	7,941
2 May 1998	Wigan Athletic (H)	0–0		10,361

=== Partial league table ===
Football League Second Division final table, leading positions
Pos	Team	Pld	W	D	L	GF	GA	GD	Pts	Promotion or relegation
1	Watford	46	24	16	6	67	41	+26	88	Division Champions, promoted
2	Bristol City	46	25	10	11	69	39	+30	85	Promoted
3	Grimsby Town	46	19	15	12	55	37	+18	72	Participated in play-offs
4	Northampton Town	46	18	17	11	52	37	+15	71	Participated in play-offs
5	Bristol Rovers	46	20	10	16	70	64	+6	70	Participated in play-offs
6	Fulham	46	20	10	16	60	43	+17	70	Participated in play-offs
7	Wrexham	46	18	16	12	55	51	+4	70	
8	Gillingham	46	19	13	14	52	47	+5	70	

== Cup matches ==
=== FA Cup ===
As a Second Division team, Gillingham entered the 1997–98 FA Cup in the first round and were drawn to play fellow Second Division team Bristol Rovers. The match took place at the Memorial Stadium in Bristol; after each team scored once in the first half, Akinibiyi scored within the last ten minutes of the game to give Gillingham a 2–1 lead, but Bristol Rovers scored again and the game ended in a draw, necessitating a replay at Priestfield. In the second match, Bristol Rovers scored twice in the first half and went on to win 2–0 and eliminate Gillingham from the competition.

==== Match details ====
Key

- In result column, Gillingham's score shown first
- H = Home match
- A = Away match
- pen. = Penalty kick
- o.g. = Own goal

Results
Date	Round	Opponents	Result	Goalscorers	Attendance
14 November 1997	First	Bristol Rovers (A)	2–2	Onoura, Akinbiyi	4,825
25 November 1997	First (replay)	Bristol Rovers (H)	0–2		4,459

=== Football League Cup ===
As a Second Division team, Gillingham entered the 1997–98 Football League Cup in the first round and were paired with Birmingham City of the First Division. Gillingham lost both legs of the two-legged tie without scoring a goal and were eliminated from the competition by an aggregate score of 4–0.

==== Match details ====
Key

- In result column, Gillingham's score shown first
- H = Home match
- A = Away match
- pen. = Penalty kick
- o.g. = Own goal

Results
Date	Round	Opponents	Result	Goalscorers	Attendance
12 August 1997	First (first leg)	Birmingham City (H)	0–1		5,246
26 August 1997	First (second leg)	Birmingham City (A)	0–3		7,921

=== Football League Trophy ===
In the first round of the 1997–98 Football League Trophy, a competition for Second and Third Division teams, Gillingham played at home to Third Division Peterborough United; the match drew an attendance of only 905, the lowest in the club's history for a game against professional opposition. A goal early in the second half gave Peterborough a 1–0 win and eliminated Gillingham from the competition.

==== Match details ====
Key

- In result column, Gillingham's score shown first
- H = Home match
- A = Away match
- pen. = Penalty kick
- o.g. = Own goal

Results
Date	Round	Opponents	Result	Goalscorers	Attendance
9 December 1997	First	Peterborough United (H)	0–1		905

== Players ==
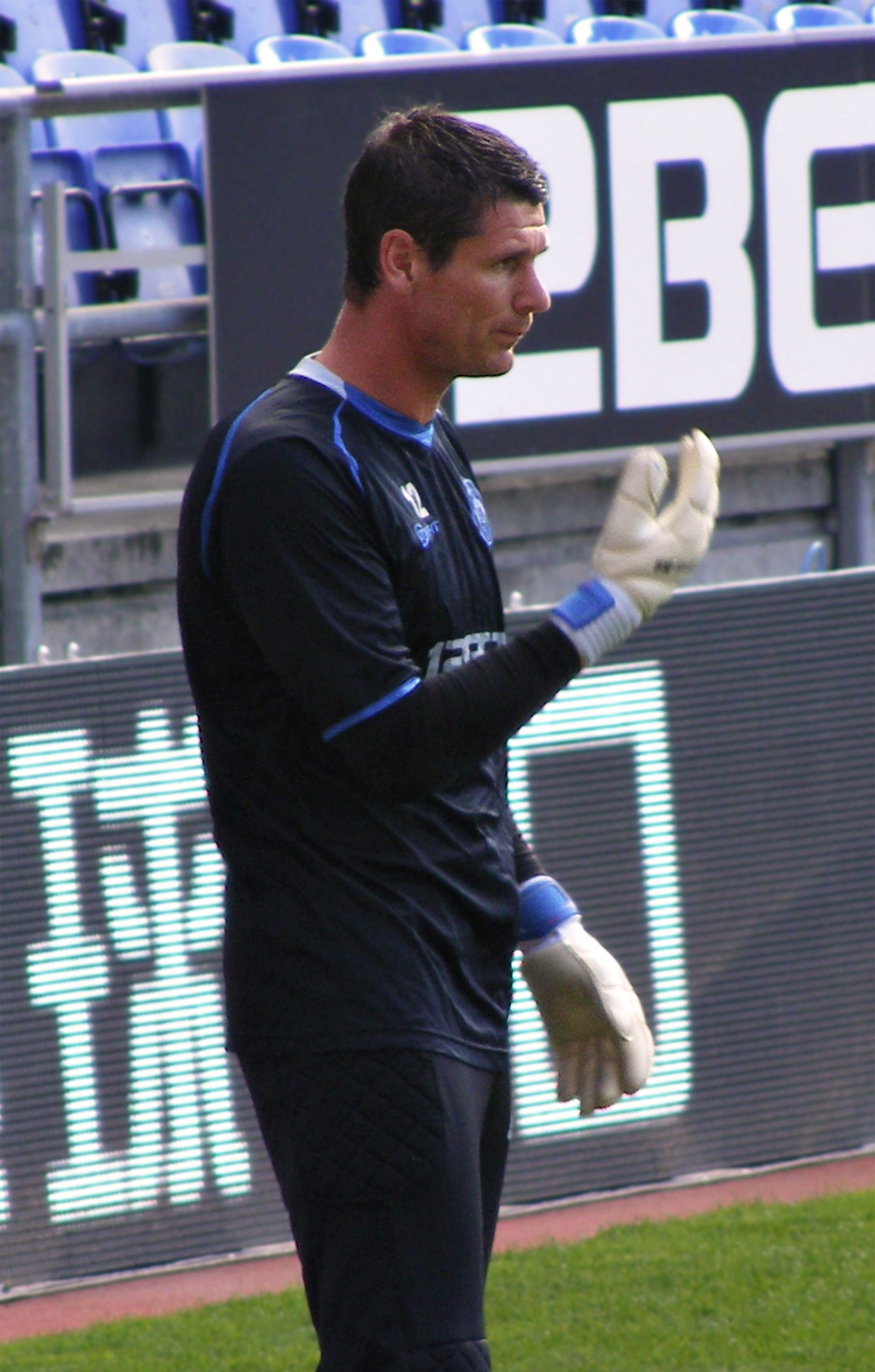
Mike Pollitt (pictured in 2011) was one of five goalkeepers to play for Gillingham during the season.

Thirty players made at least one appearance for Gillingham during the season. Smith made the most; he was the only player who took part in all 51 of the team's games. Akinibiyi, Butler, Ashby, Andy Hessenthaler, and Galloway all played more than 40 times. Four players made only one appearance during the season. One of these was Mark O'Connor, who had made a comeback during the previous season after taking nearly a year to recover from a serious injury; after taking part in just one game in the 1997–98 season, he retired from playing and joined the club's coaching staff.

Eleven players scored at least one goal for the team; Akinibiyi was the top scorer, with 21 goals in Second Division matches and 1 in the League Cup for a total of 22 in all competitions. As the team only scored 54 times in total, Akinbiyi accounted for just over 40% of Gillingham's goals during the season. Butters was the second-highest goalscorer, with a total of seven.

Player statistics
Player	Position	Second Division		FA Cup		League Cup		League Trophy		Total	
Player	Position	Apps	Goals	Apps	Goals	Apps	Goals	Apps	Goals	Apps	Goals
Ade Akinbiyi	FW	44	21	2	1	2	0	1	0	49	22
Barry Ashby	DF	43	0	2	0	1	0	1	0	47	0
Dennis Bailey	FW	13	1	0	0	0	0	0	0	13	1
Vince Bartram	GK	9	0	0	0	0	0	0	0	9	0
Matt Bryant	DF	35	0	1	0	2	0	1	0	39	0
Steve Butler	FW	43	6	2	0	2	0	1	0	48	6
Guy Butters	DF	31	7	2	0	2	0	0	0	35	7
Ian Chapman	DF	0	0	0	0	1	0	0	0	1	0
Jimmy Corbett	MF	16	2	0	0	1	0	1	0	18	2
Leo Fortune-West	FW	20	4	1	0	1	0	0	0	22	4
Mick Galloway	MF	39	1	2	0	2	0	0	0	43	1
Richard Green	DF	25	0	0	0	2	0	1	0	28	0
Andy Hessenthaler	MF	42	0	2	0	2	0	1	0	47	0
Neil Masters	DF	11	0	0	0	0	0	1	0	12	0
Neil Moss	GK	10	0	0	0	2	0	0	0	12	0
George Ndah	FW	4	0	0	0	0	0	0	0	4	0
Mark O'Connor	MF	0	0	0	0	1	0	0	0	1	0
Iffy Onuora	FW	22	2	2	1	0	0	1	0	25	3
Mark Patterson	DF	23	0	2	0	0	0	0	0	25	0
Adrian Pennock	DF	20	0	0	0	0	0	0	0	20	0
James Pinnock	FW	1	0	0	0	0	0	0	0	1	0
Lenny Piper	MF	1	0	0	0	1	0	0	0	2	0
Mike Pollitt	GK	6	0	0	0	0	0	0	0	6	0
Simon Ratcliffe	DF	21	1	2	0	2	0	1	0	26	1
Paul Smith	MF	46	3	2	0	2	0	1	0	51	3
Nicky Southall	MF	23	2	0	0	0	0	1	0	24	2
Jim Stannard	GK	20	0	2	0	0	0	1	0	23	0
Brian Statham	DF	20	0	2	0	0	0	1	0	23	0
Glen Thomas	DF	3	0	0	0	0	0	0	0	3	0
Mark Walton	GK	1	0	0	0	0	0	0	0	1	0

FW = Forward, MF = Midfielder, GK = Goalkeeper, DF = Defender

== Aftermath ==
Shortly after the end of the season, top goalscorer Akinbiyi joined Bristol City of the First Division for a fee of £1.2 million (equivalent to £2.7 million in 2023), a new record for the highest transfer fee received by Gillingham. Highly-rated teenager Corbett moved to Premier League club Blackburn Rovers for an initial fee of £525,000 (equivalent to £1.27 million in 2023); clauses in the contract meant that the fee had the potential to nearly double if Corbett played more than a specified number of games at the higher level. A succession of injuries, however, limited his playing time at Blackburn and Gillingham received no further money.

In the 1998–99 season, Gillingham finished 4th in the Second Division and qualified for the play-offs. After defeating Preston North End in the semi-finals, they played Manchester City at Wembley Stadium in the final. Gillingham were 2–0 up with less than ten minutes remaining but conceded two late goals, and Manchester City won the subsequent penalty shoot-out to gain promotion. One month later, Pulis was dismissed from his job, amid accusations of gross misconduct on his part. He brought a case against the club for unfair dismissal and ultimately accepted an out-of-court settlement of £75,000 (equivalent to £157,000 in 2023).
