= Steve Hutchings =

English footballer (born 1990)

Personal information
- Full name: Stephen Hutchings
- Date of birth: 13 December 1990 (age 35)
- Place of birth: Portsmouth, England
- Position: Forward

Youth career
- 2006–2008: Bournemouth

Senior career*
Years	Team	Apps	(Gls)
2008–2009	Bournemouth	1	(0)
2009	→ Dorchester Town (loan)	1	(1)
2009–2010	Havant & Waterlooville	7	(0)
2011–	Moneyfields	365	(271)
- * Club domestic league appearances and goals as of 3 March 2023

Stephen Hutchings (born 13 December 1990) is an English footballer, who played as a striker for Conference South club Havant & Waterlooville and previously Bournemouth. He now plays for Portsmouth-based Moneyfields FC in the Wessex Football League Premier Division.

Hutchings made his debut for Bournemouth at home to Millwall, in the 2–0 win in League One on 29 March 2008. He joined Conference South side Dorchester Town on a work experience deal on 13 February 2009. He returned to Bournemouth from his work experience deal at Dorchester Town on 30 March 2009. On 18 December 2021 Hutchings scored his 250th goal for Moneyfields against AFC Stoneham.
