= Derek Holmes =

Scottish footballer

Personal information
- Full name: Derek Holmes
- Date of birth: 18 October 1978 (age 48)
- Place of birth: Lanark, Scotland
- Height: 6 ft 2 in (1.88 m)
- Position: Forward

Youth career
- 1995–1997: Heart of Midlothian

Senior career*
Years	Team	Apps	(Gls)
1997–1999	Heart of Midlothian	8	(1)
1997–1998	→ Cowdenbeath (loan)	13	(5)
1999	→ Raith Rovers (loan)	14	(6)
1999–2001	Ross County	58	(14)
2001	→ AFC Bournemouth (loan)	15	(2)
2001–2005	AFC Bournemouth	101	(14)
2005–2007	Carlisle United	92	(15)
2007–2008	Rotherham United	37	(11)
2008–2009	St Johnstone	35	(5)
2009–2011	Queen of the South	66	(14)
2011–2012	Airdrie United	32	(4)
2012–2013	Arbroath	33	(8)
2013	East Fife	1	(0)
Total		505	(99)

Managerial career
- 2018: Wishaw Juniors
- 2018–: Larkhall Thistle
- * Club domestic league appearances and goals

Derek Holmes (born 18 October 1978) is a Scottish former professional footballer who played for Heart of Midlothian, Cowdenbeath, Raith Rovers, Ross County, AFC Bournemouth, Carlisle United, Rotherham United, St Johnstone, Queen of the South, Airdrie United, Arbroath and East Fife. He has also had spells managing Wishaw Juniors and Larkhall Thistle.

== Playing career ==
=== Hearts ===
Holmes, who was born in Lanark, started his career in 1995 when he signed for Scottish outfit Hearts. He made his first-team debut on 10 May 1997. This was when he started in the 3–1 home win against champions Rangers in the last game of the league season. Holmes spent three months of the following season on loan at Cowdenbeath.

After the Cowdenbeath loan, Holmes started the following season in the Hearts first team squad. Among the games he played in were the home and away ties against Real Mallorca in the European Cup Winners' Cup and a 2–1 win against Celtic. After New Year, now aged 21, he was loaned out to Raith Rovers for the rest of the season.

=== Ross County ===
In 1999, Holmes left Hearts and joined Ross County where he spent two seasons, achieving some success by consistently getting on the scoresheet. At the end of his first season in Dingwall, Holmes and his teammates earned a promotion spot from the Scottish Second Division. County cemented their first division status in Holmes' second season by finishing comfortably in mid table.

=== AFC Bournemouth ===
After a brief loan spell with AFC Bournemouth making his debut on 15 September 2001, he joined them on a permanent deal. Holmes enjoyed another promotion campaign when in his second season on the South coast – promotion was achieved to the third tier of English football. Bournemouth stayed at this level for the remainder of Holmes' spell there. During his four-year spell with Bournemouth, Holmes was occasionally used as a midfielder. In 2005, he made his 100th and last league appearance for the club.

=== Carlisle United ===
Holmes joined Carlisle United shortly afterwards. He debuted on 26 February 2005. Holmes added to his list of promotion successes with two in his three campaigns in Cumbria, the first of which was as divisional champions.

=== Rotherham United ===
After the end of the 2006–07 season, he joined Football League Two side Rotherham United. Holmes made an immediate impression for his new club by scoring a double against Peterborough. He scored the first league hat-trick of his career against Lincoln City in January 2008.

=== St Johnstone ===
In July 2008, Holmes completed a free transfer move to Scottish First Division side St Johnstone on a one-year deal. Holmes helped Saints to the First Division championship and promotion to the Scottish Premier League in his only season at the club. Holmes was offered a new one-year contract by Saints but declined the offer in preference to a two-year offer from Queen of the South.

=== Queen of the South ===
Holmes signed a two-year contract with Dumfries club Queen of the South. In the 4–1 win away to Dunfermline on 26 September 2009 that put Queens top of the table, Holmes took on the role of penalty taker in the absence of the injured Steve Tosh. Holmes' three goals away against Inverness Caledonian Thistle on 10 October 2009 added up to a 'perfect hat trick' – a goal from each of his head, his left foot and his right foot. This made Holmes the top scorer in the division at this point in the season with seven goals in nine league games. This is an unusual achievement for Holmes whose game is based more on linking forward play and creating chances for teammates as opposed to being a goal grabbing striker. On 7 November 2009, Holmes added another vital goal to his tally, the only score a 1–0 away win to Ayr United to keep Queens top of the table.

In David Lilley's absence through suspension, Holmes deputised as captain for Queens on 6 April 2010 against Ross County, one of his former clubs, at Victoria Park, Dingwall in a 1–1 draw. He did so again on 10 April 2010 at Palmerston Park against Inverness Caley Thistle in a 3–1 defeat.

Holmes ended his first season at Palmerston Park with a league scoring record averaging one goal in every three of his 36 league games.

Among his goals in 2010/11 was his side's second in the Challenge Cup semi final 2–1 win away at Peterhead on 9 October 2010. On 19 May 2011 it was announced that Holmes had been released by the club.

=== Later career ===
Holmes signed for Airdrie United in July 2011, and left after one year, having scored 4 goals in 32 league appearances. Holmes signed for Arbroath on 3 July 2012.

== Management ==
Holmes entered football management for the first time with hometown club, Wishaw Juniors, in February 2018. Despite steering the club to the semi-finals of the 2017–18 Scottish Junior Cup, Holmes was sacked by Wishaw in May 2018, but re-entered management the following month with Larkhall Thistle.

== Honours ==
Ross County

- Scottish Second Division promotion: 1999–2000

Bournemouth

- Football League Third Division play-offs: 2003

Carlisle United

- Football League Two: 2005–06
- Football League Trophy runner-up: 2005–06

St Johnstone

- Scottish First Division: 2008–09
