= Shaun Maher =

Irish footballer (born 1978)

Personal information
- Full name: Shaun Maher
- Date of birth: 10 June 1978 (age 48)
- Place of birth: Dublin, Ireland
- Position: Centre back

Senior career*
Years	Team	Apps	(Gls)
1997	Bohemians	12	(?)
1997–1999	Fulham	3	(0)
2000–2001	Bohemians	54	(?)
2001–2007	AFC Bournemouth	117	(5)
2008	Drogheda United	15	(1)
2009–2010	Sporting Fingal	38	(1)
2011	Galway United	13	(0)
2011	Limerick	1	(0)
2012	Monaghan United	x	(x)
2013	Ballymena United	8	(0)
- * Club domestic league appearances and goals as of 19:43, 5 November 2013 (UTC)

Shaun Maher (born 10 June 1978 in Finglas, Dublin) is an Irish professional footballer who plays as a defender.

Maher played for Stella Maris before he signed for Bohemians in 1996. He made his first team debut, in Belarus, in the UEFA Cup away to Dinamo Minsk in July 1996. Having established himself as a first team regular, he was enticed away to Kevin Keegan's Fulham in December 1997. He managed to make 3 first team appearances as a teenager at Craven Cottage. He returned to Bohs in September 1998. He enjoyed a tremendous season in 2000/01 when winning the "Double" of League of Ireland and FAI Cup. He also scored the equalising goal against Aberdeen in a 2–1 away win at Pittodrie in the UEFA Cup that season.

After playing and scoring in the Champions League qualifiers in the summer of 2001, Maher moved to AFC Bournemouth where he played until December 2007. During Maher's time at Bournemouth he embarked on his coaching career working with the Centre of Excellence at the club, whilst completing his coaching qualifications with the English FA. In January 2008, Maher was enticed home and signed for the current Champions Drogheda United where he again played in the Champions League qualifiers.

In January 2009 he signed for Sporting Fingal in a player coach capacity whilst continuing his coaching qualifications with the FAI (Football Association of Ireland).. Sporting Fingal achieved promotion to the Premier Division and better was to come as Fingal and Maher won the FAI Cup when beating Sligo Rovers 2–1 at Tallaght Stadium in tandem with helping develop the clubs younger players.

After Sporting Fingal ceased operations Maher and the other players were released from their contracts.

He then signed for Galway United for the 2011 campaign. Due to Galway's financial difficulties he signed for Limerick F.C. in July 2011.

Shaun rejoined his old boss Roddy Collins at Monaghan United for the 2012 season as player/assistant manager. On 18 June 2012, the club announced their withdrawal from the League of Ireland and all of their playing and coaching staff were released by the club.

In June 2012 Shaun worked in a coaching capacity with Dundalk while working on his UEFA A-Licence Coaching Diploma.

After completing his UEFA A-Licence Coaching Qualification Shaun Maher signed a short-term deal with County Antrim Shield Winners Ballymena United

Shaun is now an assistant coach with Shelbourne Ladies Football Club in Dublin. The side have won both the FAI Cup Final and the Women's National League in 2016.

== Honours ==
Bohemians

- Presidents Cup 1996 - 1997
- League of Ireland (1): 2000-01
- FAI Cup (1): 2001

Sporting Fingal

- FAI Cup (1): 2009
