= Warren Cummings =

Scottish footballer

Personal information
- Full name: Warren Thomas Cummings
- Date of birth: 15 October 1980 (age 46)
- Place of birth: Aberdeen, Scotland
- Height: 5 ft 9 in (1.75 m)
- Position: Defender

Youth career
- Chelsea

Senior career*
Years	Team	Apps	(Gls)
2000–2003	Chelsea	0	(0)
2000–2001	→ AFC Bournemouth (loan)	10	(1)
2001	→ West Bromwich Albion (loan)	3	(0)
2001–2002	→ West Bromwich Albion (loan)	14	(0)
2002	→ Dundee United (loan)	8	(0)
2002	→ Dundee United (loan)	3	(0)
2003	→ AFC Bournemouth (loan)	16	(0)
2003–2012	AFC Bournemouth	234	(5)
2012	→ Crawley Town (loan)	9	(0)
2012–2013	AFC Wimbledon	9	(0)
2013	Poole Town	6	(0)
2013–2016	Havant & Waterlooville	61	(1)
Total		373	(7)

International career
2002	Scotland	1	(0)

Managerial career
- 2023–2025: Turriff United
- * Club domestic league appearances and goals

Warren Thomas Cummings (born 15 October 1980) is a Scottish former professional footballer who played as a defender. He played for Chelsea, AFC Bournemouth, West Bromwich Albion, Dundee United, Crawley Town, AFC Wimbledon, Poole Town and Havant & Waterlooville. Cummings also played once for the Scotland national football team, in 2002.

Most recently, he was manager of Highland League club, Turriff United.

== Club career ==
Cummings started his career at Chelsea but never made it into the first team, and instead was loaned out several times – AFC Bournemouth 2000–01, West Bromwich Albion 2000–01 and 2001–02, and Dundee United in 2002–03.

Following his return from the Dundee United loan spell, Cummings was again loaned to Bournemouth, for a three-month spell, before signing a permanent deal with the club. He went on to make 23 appearances for "The Cherries" in that season, helping them win promotion via the playoffs. In the following season he established himself as a first team player, making 46 appearances in total and scoring 2 goals.

The 2004–05 season brought a playoff push for "The Cherries", with Cummings playing an important part and scoring 3 goals. However, during an away derby with Swindon Town in March 2005, he suffered a double broken leg in a crunch tackle by Swindon's Steve Jenkins. This was a major blow to both Cummings and Bournemouth, and was a major factor in them failing in their playoff bid. Nonetheless, Cummings signed a new deal with Bournemouth in the summer of 2006. He made his league return as a late substitute in the 3–0 defeat to Chesterfield at the start of the 2006–07 campaign. In June 2007 Cummings signed a new two-year deal with Bournemouth. He broke his arm in a 1–1 draw with Northampton Town on 15 September 2007.

On 29 June 2012 it was announced that he has signed with League Two club AFC Wimbledon. He played a total of 9 league games for the "Dons" before being released from the club on 10 July 2013.

On 16 August 2013, Cummings joined Southern League Premier Division side Poole Town.

For his services to Bournemouth, Cummings received a testimonial match against AC Milan on 3 September 2016; the match marked the club debut for England star Jack Wilshere.

== International career ==
Cummings won one Scotland cap, when he played in a Far East tour game against the Hong Kong League XI in May 2002. Scotland won the Reunification Cup match 4–0.

== Coaching career ==
In October 2023, Cummings was appointed manager of Highland League club, Turriff United. He resigned from the position in December 2025.

== Honours ==
AFC Bournemouth

- Football League Third Division play-offs: 2003

Individual

- PFA Team of the Year: 2004–05 Football League One
