= 1995–96 AFC Bournemouth season =

Bournemouth
1995–96 season
- Manager: Mel Machin
- Stadium: Dean Court
- Second Division: 14th
- FA Cup: Second Round
- League Cup: Second Round
- Football League Trophy: Second Round
- Top goalscorer: League: Jones (18); All: Jones (21)
Home colours

During the 1995–96 English football season, AFC Bournemouth competed in the Football League Second Division.

== Final league table ==
Pos	Team	Pld	W	D	L	GF	GA	GD	Pts
12	Wycombe Wanderers	46	15	15	16	63	59	+4	60
13	Bristol City	46	15	15	16	55	60	−5	60
14	Bournemouth	46	16	10	20	51	70	−19	58
15	Brentford	46	15	13	18	43	49	−6	58
16	Rotherham United	46	14	14	18	54	62	−8	56

== Results ==
Bournemouth's score comes first

=== Legend ===
Win	Draw	Loss

=== Football League Second Division ===
Date	Opponent	Venue	Result	Attendance	Scorers
12 August 1995	Bradford City	A	0–1	5,107	
19 August 1995	Peterborough United	H	3–0	4,175	Jones (3)
26 August 1995	Wycombe Wanderers	A	2–1	4,749	Murray, Jones
29 August 1995	Wrexham	H	1–1	4,825	Jones
2 September 1995	Rotherham United	H	2–1	4,906	Brissett, Holland
9 September 1995	Notts County	A	0–2	4,875	
12 September 1995	Blackpool	A	1–2	3,884	Jones
16 September 1995	Crewe Alexandra	H	0–4	4,488	
24 September 1995	Brighton & Hove Albion	H	3–1	4,560	Jones, Robinson (2)
30 September 1995	Stockport County	A	1–3	5,655	Bailey
7 October 1995	Bristol Rovers	A	2–0	5,165	Bailey, Brissett
14 October 1995	Burnley	H	0–2	4,954	
21 October 1995	Swansea City	A	1–1	1,988	Jones
28 October 1995	Carlisle United	H	2–0	4,250	Brissett, Fletcher
31 October 1995	Swindon Town	H	0–0	6,352	
4 November 1995	Walsall	A	0–0	3,626	
18 November 1995	Brentford	H	1–0	3,894	Victory
25 November 1995	Chesterfield	A	0–3	4,034	
9 December 1995	Brighton & Hove Albion	A	0–2	5,414	
16 December 1995	Stockport County	H	3–2	3,638	Jones, Ndah, Holland
23 December 1995	Hull City	H	2–0	3,491	Jones, Holland
26 December 1995	Oxford United	A	0–2	6,347	
2 January 1996	Shrewsbury Town	H	0–2	3,245	
6 January 1996	Bristol City	H	1–1	3,667	Morris
13 January 1996	Peterborough United	A	5–4	4,596	Mean, Jones (2), Ndah, Casper
20 January 1996	Bradford City	H	3–1	3,628	Jones, Holland, Robinson
3 February 1996	Wycombe Wanderers	H	2–3	4,447	Bailey, Holland
10 February 1996	Bristol City	A	0–3	6,217	
17 February 1996	Blackpool	H	1–0	4,157	Holland
20 February 1996	Rotherham United	A	0–1	2,092	
24 February 1996	Crewe Alexandra	A	0–2	3,535	
27 February 1996	Notts County	H	0–2	3,191	
2 March 1996	Oxford United	H	0–1	3,996	
9 March 1996	Hull City	A	1–1	2,853	Scott
12 March 1996	Wrexham	A	0–5	2,003	
16 March 1996	York City	H	2–2	3,505	Robinson (2)
23 March 1996	Shrewsbury Town	A	2–1	2,534	Holland (2)
26 March 1996	York City	A	1–3	2,055	Holland
26 March 1996	Bristol Rovers	H	2–1	4,607	Jones, Robinson
2 April 1996	Burnley	A	0–0	7,895	
6 April 1996	Carlisle United	A	0–4	5,401	
9 April 1996	Swansea City	H	3–1	4,049	Bailey, Jones, Holland
13 April 1996	Swindon Town	A	2–2	10,862	Jones (2)
20 April 1996	Walsall	A	0–0	4,380	
27 April 1996	Chesterfield	H	2–0	4,483	Jones, Robinson
4 May 1996	Brentford	A	0–2	6,091	

=== FA Cup ===
Round	Date	Opponent	Venue	Result	Goalscorers
R1	11 November 1995	Bristol City	H	0–0	
R1R	21 November 1995	Bristol City	A	1–0	Robinson
R2	2 December 1995	Brentford	H	0–1	

=== League Cup ===
Round	Date	Opponent	Venue	Result	Goalscorers	Notes
R1 1st Leg	15 August 1995	Luton Town	A	1–1	Jones	
R1 2nd Leg	21 August 1995	Luton Town	H	2–1	Morris, Jones	Bournemouth won 3–2 on aggregate
R2 1st Leg	19 September 1995	Watford	A	1–1	Jones	
R2 2nd Leg	3 October 1995	Watford	H	1–1	Oldbury	2–2 on aggregate, Watford won 6–5 on penalties

=== Football League Trophy ===
Round	Date	Opponent	Venue	Result	Attendance
R1	27 September 1995	Brentford	H	0–1	1,092
R1	7 November 1995	Exeter City	A	2–0	1,898
R2	28 November 1995	Bristol Rovers	A	1–2	1,979

== Squad ==
Note: Flags indicate national team as defined under FIFA eligibility rules; some limited exceptions apply. Players may hold more than one non-FIFA nationality.

No.	Pos.	Nation	Player
—	GK	ENG	Jimmy Glass
—	GK	ENG	Ian Andrews
—	DF	IRL	Owen Coll
—	DF	ENG	Chris Casper (on loan from Manchester United)
—	DF	TRI	Ian Cox
—	DF	ENG	Michael Duberry (on loan from Chelsea)
—	DF	ENG	Alex Watson
—	DF	ENG	Jamie Victory
—	DF	ENG	Mark Morris
—	DF	ENG	Adrian Pennock
—	DF	ENG	Jamie Vincent
—	DF	ENG	Rob Murray
—	DF	ENG	Neil Young
—	MF	ENG	John Bailey
—	MF	ENG	Russell Beardsmore
—	MF	ENG	Michael Dean

No.	Pos.	Nation	Player
—	MF	IRL	Matt Holland
—	MF	IRL	Michael McElhatton
—	MF	ENG	Scott Mean
—	MF	ENG	Marcus Oldbury
—	MF	ENG	Paul Mitchell
—	MF	ENG	Mark Rawlinson
—	MF	NIR	Steve Robinson
—	FW	Jersey	Yazalde Santos
—	FW	ENG	Steve Strong
—	FW	ENG	Jamie Cureton (on loan from Norwich City)
—	FW	ENG	Keith Scott (on loan from Norwich City)
—	FW	ENG	George Ndah (on loan from Crystal Palace)
—	FW	ENG	Steve Jones
—	FW	ENG	Jason Brissett
—	FW	ENG	Steve Fletcher
—	FW	SCO	John O'Neill
—	FW	ENG	David Town
—	FW	ENG	Mark Watson
