= 1996–97 AFC Bournemouth season =

Bournemouth
1996–97 season
- Chairman: Ken Gardiner (until December); Brian Willis (from December)
- Manager: Mel Machin
- Stadium: Dean Court
- Second Division: 16th
- FA Cup: First round
- League Cup: First round
- Football League Trophy: First round
- Top goalscorer: League: Cox (8); All: Fletcher/Cox (8)
- Average home league attendance: 4,581
Home colours

During the 1996–97 English football season, AFC Bournemouth competed in the Football League Second Division.

== Season summary ==
In the 1996–97 season, Bournemouth had another satisfying campaign, this time finishing in 16th place. Their financial problems off the pitch continued with Ken Gardiner resigning as chairman in December and Brian Willis took over as acting chairman until the summer. In January 1997, Bournemouth were £4.4m in debt and started a petition to raise £300,000 to see the whole season through. Bournemouth also owe £2.1m to Lloyds Bank and another £450,000 was also owed in VAT and PAYE that wasn't paid. As a result of this, 12 members of coaching staff were sacked which also included their assistant manager John Williams.

== Final league table ==
Pos	Team	Pld	W	D	L	GF	GA	GD	Pts
14	Millwall	46	16	13	17	50	55	−5	61
15	Preston North End	46	18	7	21	49	55	−6	61
16	Bournemouth	46	15	15	16	43	45	−2	60
17	Bristol Rovers	46	15	11	20	47	50	−3	56
18	Wycombe Wanderers	46	15	10	21	51	57	−6	55

Rules for classification: In the Football League goals scored (GF) takes precedence over goal difference (GD).

== Results ==
Bournemouth's score comes first

=== Legend ===
Win	Draw	Loss

=== Football League Second Division ===
Date	Opponent	Venue	Result	Attendance	Scorers
17 August 1996	Watford	H	1–2	7,672	Brissett
24 August 1996	York City	A	2–1	2,804	Brissett, Fletcher
27 August 1996	Stockport County	A	1–0	3,446	Brissett
31 August 1996	Peterborough United	H	1–2	4,587	Fletcher
7 September 1996	Crewe Alexandra	H	0–1	3,218	
10 September 1996	Bristol Rovers	A	2–3	4,170	Fletcher, Murray
14 September 1996	Preston North End	A	1–0	8,268	Fletcher
21 September 1996	Notts County	H	0–1	3,402	
28 September 1996	Rotherham United	A	0–1	2,648	
1 October 1996	Walsall	H	0–1	2,747	
5 October 1996	Gillingham	A	1–1	6,162	Holland
12 October 1996	Wycombe Wanderers	H	2–1	3,984	Holland, Watson
15 October 1996	Plymouth Argyle	H	1–0	3,818	Fletcher
19 October 1996	Wrexham	A	0–2	3,945	
26 October 1996	Luton Town	A	0–2	5,635	
29 October 1996	Bristol City	H	0–2	4,197	
2 November 1996	Bury	H	1–1	3,946	Holland
9 November 1996	Blackpool	A	1–1	3,744	Cox
19 November 1996	Brentford	H	2–1	3,464	Robinson (2, 1 pen)
23 November 1996	Burnley	A	0–1	8,564	
30 November 1996	Luton Town	H	3–2	4,322	Robinson (2), Cox
3 December 1996	Shrewsbury Town	A	1–1	1,610	Holland
14 December 1996	Millwall	H	1–1	4,494	Holland
21 December 1996	Chesterfield	A	1–1	4,174	Cox
26 December 1996	Bristol Rovers	H	1–0	5,036	Watson
28 December 1996	Crewe Alexandra	A	0–2	3,687	
11 January 1997	Rotherham United	H	1–1	3,161	Cox
18 January 1997	Walsall	A	1–2	3,037	Fletcher
25 January 1997	Bristol City	A	1–0	10,434	Cox
1 February 1997	Blackpool	H	0–0	8,201	
4 February 1997	Notts County	A	2–0	2,757	Cox, Town
8 February 1997	Bury	A	1–2	3,559	Robinson (pen)
11 February 1997	Preston North End	H	2–0	4,769	Brissett, Cox
15 February 1997	Burnley	H	0–0	6,021	
22 February 1997	Brentford	A	0–1	6,071	
1 March 1997	Shrewsbury Town	H	0–0	5,810	
11 March 1997	Chesterfield	H	3–0	3,368	Fletcher, Robinson, Rawlinson
15 March 1997	Millwall	A	1–0	8,992	Bailey
22 March 1997	York City	H	1–1	4,367	Town
29 March 1997	Watford	A	1–0	10,019	Cox
1 April 1997	Stockport County	H	0–0	5,476	
5 April 1997	Peterborough United	A	1–3	4,221	Rawlinson
12 April 1997	Gillingham	H	2–2	5,008	Murray, Robinson
19 April 1997	Wycombe Wanderers	A	1–1	6,043	Holland
26 April 1997	Wrexham	H	2–1	4,805	O'Neill, Holland
3 May 1997	Plymouth Argyle	A	0–0	6,507	

=== FA Cup ===
Round	Date	Opponent	Venue	Result	Attendance	Goalscorers
R1	16 November 1996	Brentford	A	0–2	4,509	

=== League Cup ===
Round	Date	Opponent	Venue	Result	Attendance	Goalscorers
R1 1st Leg	20 August 1996	Ipswich Town	A	1–2	6,163	Fletcher
R1 2nd Leg	3 September 1996	Ipswich Town	H	0–3 (lost 1–5 on agg)	4,119	

=== Football League Trophy ===
Round	Date	Opponent	Venue	Result	Attendance	Goalscorers
SR1	10 December 1996	Plymouth Argyle	A	0–2	944	

== Squad ==
Note: Flags indicate national team as defined under FIFA eligibility rules; some limited exceptions apply. Players may hold more than one non-FIFA nationality.

No.	Pos.	Nation	Player
—	GK	ENG	Jimmy Glass
—	GK	ENG	Andy Marshall (on loan from Norwich City)
—	DF	IRL	Owen Coll
—	DF	ENG	Leo Cotterell
—	DF	TRI	Ian Cox
—	DF	ENG	Rio Ferdinand (on loan from West Ham United)
—	DF	ENG	Anthony Griffin
—	DF	ENG	Eddie Howe
—	DF	ENG	Mark Morris
—	DF	SCO	Rob Murray
—	DF	ENG	Adrian Pennock
—	DF	ENG	Jamie Vincent
—	DF	ENG	Neil Young
—	MF	ENG	John Bailey
—	MF	ENG	Russell Beardsmore
—	MF	ENG	Michael Dean

No.	Pos.	Nation	Player
—	MF	ENG	Dale Gordon
—	MF	IRL	Matt Holland
—	MF	IRL	Michael McElhatton
—	MF	ENG	Scott Mean
—	MF	IRL	Roy O'Brien
—	MF	ENG	Emmanuel Omoyinmi
—	MF	ENG	Mark Rawlinson
—	MF	NIR	Steve Robinson
—	FW	ENG	Jason Brissett
—	FW	ENG	Iyseden Christie (on loan from Coventry City)
—	FW	ENG	Steve Cotterill
—	FW	ENG	Steve Fletcher
—	FW	ENG	James Hayter
—	FW	SCO	John O'Neill
—	FW	ENG	David Town
—	FW	ENG	Mark Watson
