= 1994–95 AFC Bournemouth season =

Bournemouth
1994–95 season
- Manager: Mel Machin
- Stadium: Dean Court
- Second Division: 19th
- FA Cup: Second Round
- League Cup: Second Round
- Football League Trophy: First Round
- Top goalscorer: League: Jones (8); All: Jones (9)
Home colours

During the 1994–95 English football season, AFC Bournemouth competed in the Football League Second Division. By the turn of the year, Bournemouth had won just two league games but managed to survive relegation. It is fondly remembered by supporters as the 'Great Escape'.

== Final league table ==
Pos	Team	Pld	W	D	L	GF	GA	GD	Pts	Promotion or relegation
17	Rotherham United	46	14	14	18	57	61	−4	56	
18	Shrewsbury Town	46	13	14	19	54	62	−8	53	
19	Bournemouth	46	13	11	22	49	69	−20	50	
20	Cambridge United (R)	46	11	15	20	52	69	−17	48	Relegation to the Third Division
21	Plymouth Argyle (R)	46	12	10	24	45	83	−38	46	Relegation to the Third Division

(R) Relegated

== Results ==
Bournemouth's score comes first

=== Legend ===
Win	Draw	Loss

=== Football League Second Division ===
Date	Opponent	Venue	Result	Attendance	Scorers
13 August 1994	Wrexham	A	0-2	3,580	
20 August 1994	Blackpool	H	1-2	3,098	Cotterill
27 August 1994	Rotherham United	A	0-4	2,306	
30 August 1994	Peterborough United	H	0-3	2,649	
3 September 1994	York City	H	1-4	3,181	Aspinall (pen)
10 September 1994	Stockport County	A	0-1	4,054	
13 September 1994	Leyton Orient	A	2-3	2,536	Aspinall, Leadbitter
17 September 1994	Chester City	H	1-1	3,025	Leadbitter
24 September 1994	Cardiff City	H	3–2	3,177	Aspinall (pen), Beardsmore (2)
1 October 1994	Hull City	A	1-3	3,056	Aspinall
8 October 1994	Shrewsbury Town	A	0-3	3,684	
15 October 1994	Brentford	H	0-1	4,411	
22 October 1994	Bradford City	H	2-3	3,037	Morris, Mean
29 October 1994	Huddersfield Town	A	1-3	11,251	Jones
2 November 1994	Brighton & Hove Albion	A	0–0	5,631	
5 November 1994	Cambridge United	H	1–0	3,626	Robinson
19 November 1994	Birmingham City	A	0–0	15,477	
26 November 1994	Oxford United	H	0-2	4,277	
10 December 1994	Blackpool	A	1-3	3,847	
16 December 1994	Wrexham	H	1-3	2,505	Hughes O.G.
26 December 1994	Bristol Rovers	A	1-2	6,913	Pennock
27 December 1994	Crewe Alexandra	H	1-1	3,325	Beardsmore
31 December 1994	Wycombe Wanderers	A	1-1	5,990	Robinson
2 January 1995	Swansea City	H	3-2	3,816	Fletcher (2), Pennock
7 January 1995	Bradford City	A	2-1	5,426	Robinson Leadbitter (pen)
14 January 1995	Plymouth Argyle	H	0-0	4,913	
21 January 1995	Cambridge United	A	2-2	2,834	Pennock, McElhatton
28 January 1995	Huddersfield Town	H	0-2	4,427	
4 February 1995	Oxford United	A	3–0	5,473	Jones (2), Fletcher
11 February 1995	Brighton & Hove Albion	H	0–3	5,247	
18 February 1995	Plymouth Argyle	A	1-0	5,435	McElhatton
21 February 1995	Birmingham City	H	2-1	6,024	Mean, Jones
25 February 1995	Hull City	H	2-3	4,345	Jones, Pennock
4 March 1995	Cardiff City	A	1-1	3,008	Fletcher
7 March 1995	York City	A	0-1	2,301	
11 March 1995	Rotherham United	A	1-1	5,666	Morris
18 March 1995	Peterborough United	A	0-0	4,495	
21 March 1995	Stockport County	H	2-0	2,892	Jones, Fletcher
25 March 1995	Chester City	A	1-1	1,618	Fletcher
1 April 1995	Leyton Orient	H	2–0	4,118	Holland, Pennock
8 April 1995	Wycombe Wanderers	H	2-0	8,615	Mean (pen x2)
15 April 1995	Crewe Alexandra	A	0-2	3,906	
18 April 1995	Bristol Rovers	H	2–0	7,020	Morris, Jones
22 April 1995	Swansea City	A	0–1	2,664	
29 April 1995	Brentford	A	2–1	10,079	Mean, Jones
2 May 1995	Shrewsbury Town	H	3-0	10,737	Mean, Robinson (2)

=== FA Cup ===
Round	Date	Opponent	Venue	Result	Goalscorers
R1	12 November 1994	Worthing	H	3-1	Morris, Russell, McElhatton
R2	3 December 1994	Plymouth Argyle	A	1-2	Jones

=== League Cup ===
Round	Date	Opponent	Venue	Result	Goalscorers	Notes
R1 1st Leg	16 August 1994	Northampton Town	H	2-0	Russell, Cotterill	
R1 2nd Leg	6 September 1994	Northampton Town	A	1-0	Cotterill	Bournemouth won 3-0 on aggregate
R2 1st Leg	21 September 1994	Chelsea	A	0-1		
R2 2nd Leg	4 October 1994	Chelsea	H	0-1		Chelsea won 2-0 on aggregate

=== Football League Trophy ===
Round	Date	Opponent	Venue	Result	Attendance
R1	19 October 1994	Bristol Rovers	A	1–1	1,725
R1	8 November 1994	Oxford United	H	0-0	1,374

== Squad ==
Note: Flags indicate national team as defined under FIFA eligibility rules; some limited exceptions apply. Players may hold more than one non-FIFA nationality.

No.	Pos.	Nation	Player
—	GK	ENG	David Wells
—	GK	ENG	Ian Andrews
—	DF	ENG	Mark Morris
—	DF	ENG	Rob Murray
—	DF	ENG	Gary Chivers
—	DF	ENG	Chris Ferrett
—	DF	ENG	Adrian Pennock
—	DF	ENG	Lee Russell (on loan from Portsmouth)
—	DF	ENG	Alex Watson
—	DF	ENG	Jamie Vincent
—	DF	ENG	Neil Young
—	DF	ENG	Stuart Barfoot
—	MF	ENG	Warren Aspinall
—	MF	ENG	Russell Beardsmore
—	MF	ENG	Shaun Brooks
—	MF	IRL	Matt Holland
—	MF	ENG	Chris Leadbitter

No.	Pos.	Nation	Player
—	MF	IRL	Michael McElhatton
—	MF	ENG	Scott Mean
—	MF	ENG	Mark O'Connor
—	MF	NIR	Steve Robinson
—	MF	ENG	Kevin Russell
—	MF	ENG	Tony Scully (on loan from Crystal Palace)
—	MF	ENG	Gareth Williams
—	MF	IRL	Sean O'Driscoll
—	FW	ENG	Jason Brissett
—	FW	ENG	Steve Fletcher
—	FW	ENG	Steve Cotterill
—	FW	ENG	Steve Jones
—	FW	ENG	Jamie Reeve
—	FW	ENG	Steve Strong
—	FW	ENG	David Town
