= 1997–98 AFC Bournemouth season =

Bournemouth
1997–98 season
- Chairman: Trevor Watkins
- Manager: Mel Machin
- Stadium: Dean Court
- Second Division: 9th
- FA Cup: Third round
- League Cup: First round
- Auto Windscreens Shield: Runners up
- Top goalscorer: League: S Fletcher (12); All: Robinson/S Fletcher (13)
- Average home league attendance: 4,732
Home colours

During the 1997–98 English football season, AFC Bournemouth competed in the Football League Second Division.

== Season summary ==
In the 1997–98 season, Bournemouth finished again mid-table in 9th place. The main highlight of their season was the Cherries reaching the Football League Trophy final against Grimsby Town but ended up losing 2–1 to a golden goal in their first Wembley appearance.

== Final league table ==
Pos	Team	Pld	W	D	L	GF	GA	GD	Pts
7	Wrexham	46	18	16	12	55	51	+4	70
8	Gillingham	46	19	13	14	52	47	+5	70
9	Bournemouth	46	18	12	16	57	52	+5	66
10	Chesterfield	46	16	17	13	46	44	+2	65
11	Wigan Athletic	46	17	11	18	64	66	−2	62

Rules for classification: In the Football League goals scored (GF) takes precedence over goal difference (GD).

== Results ==
Bournemouth's score comes first

=== Legend ===
Win	Draw	Loss

=== Football League Second Division ===
Date	Opponent	Venue	Result	Attendance	Scorers
9 August 1997	Northampton Town	A	2–0	6,384	Vincent, S Fletcher
16 August 1997	Wigan Athletic	H	1–0	3,799	Rolling
23 August 1997	Oldham Athletic	A	1–2	4,986	Robinson
30 August 1997	Blackpool	H	2–0	4,196	Tomlinson, Robinson
2 September 1997	Bristol Rovers	H	1–1	5,550	Robinson (pen)
5 September 1997	Gillingham	A	1–2	5,168	S Fletcher
13 September 1997	Luton Town	H	1–1	4,561	O'Neill
20 September 1997	Bristol City	A	1–1	8,330	Robinson
27 September 1997	Grimsby Town	H	0–1	3,712	
4 October 1997	Chesterfield	A	1–1	4,482	Rolling
11 October 1997	Preston North End	A	1–0	8,531	Warren
18 October 1997	Fulham	H	2–1	7,484	Cox (2)
21 October 1997	Millwall	H	0–0	4,752	
25 October 1997	Burnley	A	2–2	9,501	Howe, Vincent
1 November 1997	Brentford	H	0–0	4,772	
4 November 1997	Wrexham	A	1–2	2,462	Warren
8 November 1997	Plymouth Argyle	A	0–3	5,067	
18 November 1997	Southend United	H	2–1	3,019	S Fletcher, Warren
22 November 1997	Carlisle United	H	3–2	3,709	S Fletcher, Beardsmore, O'Neill
29 November 1997	Wycombe Wanderers	A	1–1	4,340	Robinson (pen)
2 December 1997	York City	H	0–0	3,365	
13 December 1997	Walsall	A	1–2	3,548	Robinson
20 December 1997	Watford	H	0–1	6,081	
26 December 1997	Gillingham	H	4–0	5,672	Jones (2), Robinson, Young
28 December 1997	Bristol Rovers	A	3–5	7,256	Jones, Cox, Robinson (pen)
10 January 1998	Northampton Town	H	3–0	4,257	Jones, S Fletcher, Young
17 January 1998	Blackpool	A	0–1	4,550	
24 January 1998	Oldham Athletic	H	0–0	4,079	
31 January 1998	Luton Town	A	2–1	5,466	Brissett, S Fletcher
7 February 1998	Bristol City	H	1–0	6,623	S Fletcher
14 February 1998	Chesterfield	H	2–0	4,271	Warren (2)
21 February 1998	Grimsby Town	A	1–2	5,456	Warren
24 February 1998	Fulham	A	1–0	7,708	Robinson
28 February 1998	Preston North End	H	0–2	5,009	
3 March 1998	Plymouth Argyle	H	3–3	3,545	S Fletcher (2), Vincent
7 March 1998	Brentford	A	2–3	4,973	Rolling (2)
14 March 1998	Wrexham	H	0–1	5,512	
21 March 1998	Southend United	A	3–5	4,823	Stein, Bailey, S Fletcher
28 March 1998	Carlisle United	A	1–0	4,951	Stein
4 April 1998	Wycombe Wanderers	H	0–0	4,271	
7 April 1998	Wigan Athletic	A	0–1	2,798	
11 April 1998	York City	A	1–0	2,840	O'Neill
14 April 1998	Walsall	H	1–0	3,404	S Fletcher
25 April 1998	Burnley	H	2–1	6,527	Robinson (pen), S Fletcher
28 April 1998	Watford	A	1–2	12,834	Stein
2 May 1998	Millwall	A	2–1	7,872	Witter (own goal), Stein

=== FA Cup ===
Round	Date	Opponent	Venue	Result	Attendance	Goalscorers
R1	15 November 1997	Heybridge Swifts	H	3–0	3,385	Beardsmore, Robinson (2)
R2	7 December 1997	Bristol City	H	3–1	5,687	Carey (own goal), O'Neill, Fletcher
R3	13 January 1998	Huddersfield Town	H	0–1	7,385	

=== League Cup ===
Round	Date	Opponent	Venue	Result	Attendance	Goalscorers
R1 1st Leg	12 August 1997	Torquay United	H	0–1	3,215	
R1 2nd Leg	26 August 1997	Torquay United	A	1–1 (lost 1–2 on agg)	2,278	Rolling

=== Football League Trophy ===
Round	Date	Opponent	Venue	Result	Attendance	Goalscorers
SR2	6 January 1998	Leyton Orient	H	2–0	1,732	Jones, Robinson (pen)
SQF	27 January 1998	Bristol City	H	1–0	2,124	Vincent
SSF	17 February 1998	Luton Town	H	1–0	5,367	Rolling
Southern F 1st Leg	10 March 1998	Walsall	A	2–0	6,017	Rolling, Beardsmore
Southern F 2nd Leg	17 March 1998	Walsall	H	2–3 (won 4–3 on agg)	8,972	Evans (own goal), Rolling
F	19 April 1998	Grimsby Town	N	1–2	62,432	Bailey

== Squad ==
Note: Flags indicate national team as defined under FIFA eligibility rules; some limited exceptions apply. Players may hold more than one non-FIFA nationality.

No.	Pos.	Nation	Player
-	GK	ENG	Jimmy Glass
-	DF	TRI	Ian Cox
-	DF	ENG	Neil Young
-	DF	ENG	Jamie Vincent
-	DF	ENG	Eddie Howe
-	MF	NIR	Steve Robinson
-	MF	ENG	John Bailey
-	MF	ENG	Christer Warren
-	MF	ENG	Russell Beardsmore
-	FW	ENG	Steve Fletcher
-	FW	SCO	John O'Neill
-	DF	FRA	Franck Rolling
-	MF	ENG	Mark Rawlinson

No.	Pos.	Nation	Player
-	MF	ENG	Jason Brissett
-	FW	ENG	Mark Stein
-	FW	ENG	Graeme Tomlinson (on loan from Manchester United)
-	DF	ENG	Paul Teather
-	FW	ENG	Steve Jones (on loan from Charlton Athletic)
-	MF	ENG	Justin Harrington
-	MF	ENG	Michael Dean
-	FW	ENG	David Town
-	FW	ENG	James Hayter
-	DF	SCO	Rob Murray
-	MF	WAL	Carl Fletcher
-	DF	ENG	Anthony Griffin
