= 1993–94 AFC Bournemouth season =

Bournemouth
1993–94 season
- Manager: Tony Pulis
- Stadium: Dean Court
- Second Division: 17th
- FA Cup: Third round
- League Cup: Second round
- Football League Trophy: First round

During the 1993–94 English football season, AFC Bournemouth competed in the Football League Second Division.

== Final league table ==
Pos	Team	Pld	W	D	L	GF	GA	GD	Pts
15	Rotherham United	46	15	13	18	63	60	+3	58
16	Brentford	46	13	19	14	57	55	+2	58
17	Bournemouth	46	14	15	17	51	59	−8	57
18	Leyton Orient	46	14	14	18	57	71	−14	56
19	Cardiff City	46	13	15	18	66	79	−13	54

== Results ==
Bournemouth's score comes first

=== Legend ===
Win	Draw	Loss

=== Football League Second Division ===
Date	Opponent	Venue	Result	Attendance	Scorers
14 August 1993	Bristol Rovers	A	1-0	7,234	Fletcher
21 August 1993	Bradford City	H	1-1	4,769	Cotterill
28 August 1993	Hartlepool United	A	1-1	2,482	Parkinson
31 August 1993	York City	H	3-1	4,113	McGorry (2), Cotterill
4 September 1993	Burnley	H	1-0	5,574	Cotterill
11 September 1993	Barnet	A	2-1	3,979	Masters, Fletcher
18 September 1993	Cambridge United	H	1-2	5,200	Cotterill
25 September 1993	Blackpool	A	1-2	4,489	Aspinall
2 October 1993	Stockport County	H	1-1	4,274	Cotterill
9 October 1993	Fulham	A	2-0	4,004	Fletcher, Pennock
16 October 1993	Brighton & Hove Albion	H	2-1	5,896	Masters, McGorry
23 October 1993	Leyton Orient	A	0-0	3,896	
30 October 1993	Exeter City	H	1-1	3,037	Wood
6 November 1993	Wrexham	A	1-2	4,023	Wood
20 November 1993	Hull City	H	0–2	4,124	
27 November 1993	Reading	A	0-3	5,549	
7 December 1993	Port Vale	H	2-1	2,954	Wood, Cotterill
11 December 1993	Bradford City	A	0-0	4,407	
18 December 1993	Bristol Rovers	H	3-0	4,811	
27 December 1993	Brentford	H	0-3	5,744	
1 January 1994	Plymouth Argyle	H	0-1	6,990	
3 January 1994	Huddersfield Town	A	1-1	6,047	Murray
15 January 1994	Brighton & Hove Albion	A	3-3	9,689	Murray (2), Aspinall
22 January 1994	Fulham	H	1-3	5,464	Murray
29 January 1994	Exeter City	A	2-0	3,602	Wood, Chivers
5 February 1994	Leyton Orient	H	1-1	4,084	O'Connor
12 February 1994	Swansea City	A	1-1	3,255	Cotterill
19 February 1994	Hartlepool United	H	0-0	3,201	
26 February 1994	Burnley	A	0-4	10,383	
5 March 1994	Barnet	H	1-1	3,407	Aspinall
8 March 1994	Rotherham United	A	2-1	2,884	Aspinall, Cotterill
12 March 1994	Cambridge United	A	2-3	2,836	O'Connor (2)
15 March 1994	Cardiff City	H	3-2	2,385	Chivers, Cotterill (2)
19 March 1994	Blackpool	H	1-0	3,335	Cotterill
22 March 1994	York City	A	0-2	3,648	
26 March 1994	Stockport County	A	2-0	5,277	Burns, Cotterill
29 March 1994	Huddersfield Town	A	1-2	3,104	Watson
2 April 1994	Brentford	A	1-1	4,305	Fletcher
5 April 1994	Rotherham United	H	0-0	3,097	
9 April 1994	Plymouth Argyle	A	0-2	7,971	
16 April 1994	Port Vale	A	1-2	7,603	Pennock
19 April 1994	Swansea City	H	0-1	2,465	
21 April 1994	Cardiff City	A	1-2	3,838	Fletcher
23 April 1994	Wrexham	H	1-2	2,522	Aspinall
30 April 1994	Hull City	A	1–1	4,926	Russell
5 May 1994	Reading	H	2-1	7,106	Fletcher, Cotterill

=== FA Cup ===
Round	Date	Opponent	Venue	Result	Goalscorers
R1	13 November 1993	Brighton & Hove Albion	H	4-2	Wood, Masters, Pennock, McGorry
R2	4 December 1993	Nuneaton Borough	H	1-1	Watson
R2R	15 December 1993	Nuneaton Borough	A	1-0	Cotterill
R3	8 January 1994	Preston North End	A	1-2	Aspinall (pen)

=== League Cup ===
Round	Date	Opponent	Venue	Result	Goalscorers	Notes
R1 1st Leg	17 August 1993	Cardiff City	H	3-1	Masters, Fletcher, Beardsmore	
R1 2nd Leg	24 August 1993	Cardiff City	A	1-1	Parkinson	Bournemouth won 4–2 on aggregate
R2 1st Leg	21 September 1993	Blackburn Rovers	A	0-1		
R2 2nd Leg	5 October 1993	Blackburn Rovers	H	0-0		Blackburn Rovers won 1–0 on aggregate

=== Football League Trophy ===
Round	Date	Opponent	Venue	Result	Attendance	Notes
R2	21 December 1993	Leyton Orient	H	1–1	1,383	Leyton Orient won 5–3 on penalties

== Squad ==
Note: Flags indicate national team as defined under FIFA eligibility rules; some limited exceptions apply. Players may hold more than one non-FIFA nationality.

No.	Pos.	Nation	Player
—	GK	ENG	Vince Bartram
—	GK	ENG	Neil Moss
—	DF	ENG	Mark Morris
—	DF	ENG	Rob Murray
—	DF	ENG	Gary Chivers
—	DF	ENG	Graham Mitchell (on loan from Huddersfield Town)
—	DF	ENG	Adrian Pennock
—	DF	ENG	Neil Masters
—	DF	ENG	Alex Watson
—	MF	ENG	Warren Aspinall
—	MF	ENG	Russell Beardsmore
—	MF	ENG	Chris Burns (on loan from Portsmouth)
—	MF	ENG	Justin Skinner (on loan from Wimbledon)

No.	Pos.	Nation	Player
—	MF	SCO	Dave Kevan
—	MF	ENG	Chris Leadbitter
—	MF	IRL	Michael McElhatton
—	MF	ENG	Scott Mean
—	MF	ENG	Mark O'Connor
—	MF	NIR	Brian McGorry
—	MF	ENG	Kevin Russell
—	MF	IRL	Sean O'Driscoll
—	FW	ENG	Steve Fletcher
—	FW	ENG	Steve Cotterill
—	FW	ENG	David Town
—	FW	ENG	Paul Wood
