= List of AFC Bournemouth seasons =

This is a list of seasons played by AFC Bournemouth in English football, from 1903 to the most recent completed season. The club was originally known as Boscombe F.C.. The exact date of the club's foundation is not known, but there is proof that it was formed in the autumn of 1899 out of the remains of the older Boscombe St. John's Lads’ Institute F.C.. In their first season (1899–1900), Boscombe F.C. competed in the Bournemouth and District Junior League, part of the Hampshire Football League.

In the season of 1905–06, Boscombe F.C. graduated to senior amateur football. For the first time during the season of 1913–14, the club competed in the FA Cup. The club's progress was halted in 1914, due to the outbreak of the World War I, and Boscombe F.C. returned to the Hampshire Football League. In 1920, the Third Division was formed and Boscombe were promoted to the Southern Football League. Three years later, the club was promoted to the Football League Third Division South, at which time the club was renamed Bournemouth and Boscombe Athletic Football Club. The club remains on the records as the longest continuous members of the Third Division.

Bournemouth's run in the Third Division ended in 1970 with relegation, though they were promoted back the following year. In 1972, the club adopted the more streamlined name of AFC Bournemouth. In 1987, they secured promotion to the Football League Second Division for the first time. The club managed to remain in that tier for three seasons and was relegated in 1990. In 2008, Bournemouth had 10 points deducted for entering administration and were relegated. In the 2008–09 Football League Two season, they started with a 17-point deduction, but after narrowly avoiding relegation from the Football League that season, they were promoted to League One at the end of the following season. Bournemouth's ascent continued. After making the League One play-off semi-finals in 2010–11, and achieving a mid-table finish in 2011–12, they secured a promotion to the Championship at the end of the 2012–13 season, climbing to the second tier for only the second time in their history. In the 2014–15 season, they won the Championship title, and earned promotion to the Premier League for the first time in their history.

== Seasons ==
Season	League									FA Cup	EFL Cup (Note: The EFL Cup was founded in 1961.)	Other	
Season	Division	Pld	W	D	L	GF	GA	Pts	Pos	FA Cup	EFL Cup	Other	
1903–04	HLW	14	10	1	3	31	17	21	2nd				
1904–05	HLW	16	9	3	4	42	24	21	4th				
1905–06	HLW	12	5	1	6	21	27	11	4th				
1906–07	HLW	12	10	0	2	29	10	20	1st				
1907–08	HLW	14	6	6	2	23	23	18	2nd				
1908–09	HLW	12	2	4	6	21	28	8	5th				
1909–10	HLW	12	5	3	4	26	16	13	3rd				
1910–11	HL	14	7	4	3	29	22	18	2nd				
1911–12	HL	14	10	1	3	30	14	21	2nd				
1912–13	HL	14	8	0	6	30	16	16	3rd				
1913–14	HL	16	11	3	2	54	14	25	2nd				
1914–15	—N/a									6Q			
No competitive football was played between 1915 and 1919 due to the First World War
1919–20	HL	12	6	3	3	30	14	15	3rd	—			
1920–21	SL	24	10	6	8	25	40	26	5th	—			
1921–22	SL	36	17	5	14	38	55	39	7th	6Q			
1922–23	SL ↑	38	22	7	9	67	34	51	2nd	—			
1923–24 (Note: Renamed Bournemouth & Boscombe Athletic.)	Div 3S	42	11	11	20	40	65	33	21st	—			
1924–25	Div 3S	42	13	8	21	40	58	34	20th	—			
1925–26	Div 3S	42	17	9	16	75	91	43	8th	R4			
1926–27	Div 3S	42	18	8	16	78	66	44	7th	R3			
1927–28	Div 3S	42	13	12	17	72	79	38	14th	R3			
1928–29	Div 3S	42	19	9	14	84	77	47	9th	R5			
1929–30	Div 3S	42	15	13	14	72	61	43	10th	R3			
1930–31	Div 3S	42	15	13	14	72	73	43	10th	R1			
1931–32	Div 3S	42	13	12	17	70	78	38	15th	R4			
1932–33	Div 3S	42	12	12	18	60	81	36	18th	R1			
1933–34	Div 3S	42	9	9	24	60	102	27	21st	R2			
1934–35	Div 3S	42	15	7	20	54	71	37	17th	R1			
1935–36	Div 3S	42	16	11	15	60	56	43	8th	R3			
1936–37	Div 3S	42	20	9	13	65	59	49	6th	R3			
1937–38	Div 3S	42	14	12	16	56	57	40	13th	R2			
1938–39	Div 3S	42	13	13	16	52	58	39	15th	R3			
1939–40	Div 3S	3	1	1	1	13	4	3	— (Note: The 1939–40 season was abandoned due to the outbreak of the Second World War.)	—			
No competitive football was played between 1939 and 1945 due to the Second World War
1945–46	—N/a (Note: The FA Cup was contested in 1945–46 but the Football League did not resume until the following season.)									R1		Third Division South Cup	W
1946–47	Div 3S	42	18	8	16	72	54	44	7th	R3			
1947–48	Div 3S	42	24	9	9	76	35	57	2nd	R3			
1948–49	Div 3S	42	22	8	12	69	48	52	3rd	R3			
1949–50	Div 3S	42	16	10	16	57	56	42	12th	R4			
1950–51	Div 3S	46	22	7	17	65	57	51	9th	R2			
1951–52	Div 3S	46	16	10	20	69	75	42	14th	R1			
1952–53	Div 3S	46	19	9	18	74	69	47	9th	R1			
1953–54	Div 3S	46	16	8	22	67	70	40	19th	R2			
1954–55	Div 3S	46	12	18	16	57	65	42	17th	R3			
1955–56	Div 3S	46	19	10	17	63	51	48	9th	R1			
1956–57	Div 3S	46	19	14	13	88	62	52	5th	QF			
1957–58	Div 3S	46	21	9	16	81	74	51	9th	R2			
1958–59	Div 3 (Note: The Third Division South and Third Division North merged upon Football League re-organisation.)	46	17	12	17	69	69	46	12th	R1			
1959–60	Div 3	46	17	13	16	72	72	47	10th	R4			
1960–61	Div 3	46	15	10	21	58	76	40	19th	R3	R2		
1961–62	Div 3	46	21	17	8	69	45	59	3rd	R1	R4		
1962–63	Div 3	46	18	16	12	63	46	52	5th	R1	R2		
1963–64	Div 3	46	24	8	14	79	58	56	4th	R1	R4		
1964–65	Div 3	46	18	11	17	72	63	47	11th	R2	R2		
1965–66	Div 3	46	13	12	21	38	56	38	18th	R3	R1		
1966–67	Div 3	46	12	17	17	39	57	41	20th	R2	R1		
1967–68	Div 3	46	16	15	15	56	51	47	12th	R3	R1		
1968–69	Div 3	46	21	9	16	60	45	51	4th	R2	R1		
1969–70	Div 3 ↓	46	12	15	19	48	71	39	21st	R1	R3		
1970–71	Div 4 ↑	46	24	12	10	81	46	60	2nd	R2	R1		
1971–72 (Note: Renamed AFC Bournemouth.)	Div 3	46	23	16	7	73	37	62	3rd	R3	R2		
1972–73	Div 3	46	17	16	13	66	44	50	7th	R3	R2		
1973–74	Div 3	46	16	15	15	54	58	47	11th	R3	R2		
1974–75	Div 3 ↓	46	13	12	21	44	58	38	21st	R2	R2		
1975–76	Div 4	46	20	12	14	57	48	52	6th	R2	R1		
1976–77	Div 4	46	15	18	13	54	44	48	13th	R1	R1		
1977–78	Div 4	46	14	15	17	41	51	43	17th	R1	R2		
1978–79	Div 4	46	14	11	21	47	48	39	18th	R2	R1		
1979–80	Div 4	46	13	18	15	52	51	44	11th	R2	R1		
1980–81	Div 4	46	16	13	17	47	48	45	13th	R2	R1		
1981–82	Div 4 ↑	46	23	19	4	62	30	88	4th	R3	R1		
1982–83	Div 3	46	16	13	17	59	68	61	14th	R1	R2		
1983–84	Div 3	46	16	7	23	63	73	55	17th	R4	R1	Associate Members' Cup	W
1984–85	Div 3	46	19	11	16	57	46	68	10th	R3	R1	Associate Members' Cup	SF(S)
1985–86	Div 3	46	15	9	22	65	72	54	15th	R3	R2	Associate Members' Cup	R1(S)
1986–87	Div 3 ↑	46	29	10	7	76	40	97	1st	R2	R1	Associate Members' Cup	R1(S)
1987–88	Div 2	44	13	10	21	56	68	49	17th	R3	R3		
1988–89	Div 2	46	18	8	20	53	62	62	12th	R5	R2		
1989–90	Div 2 ↓	46	12	12	22	57	76	48	22nd	R3	R3		
1990–91	Div 3	46	19	13	14	58	58	70	9th	R4	R2	Associate Members' Cup	PR(S)
1991–92	Div 3	46	20	11	15	52	48	71	8th	R4	R2	Associate Members' Cup	R1(S)
1992–93	Div 2 (Note: The 1992–93 season saw the introduction of the Premier League, so Division 1 replaced Division 2, Division 2 replaced Division 3 and Division 3 replaced Division 4.)	46	12	17	17	45	52	53	17th	R3	R1	Football League Trophy	R1(S)
1993–94	Div 2	46	14	15	17	51	59	57	17th	R3	R2	Football League Trophy	R2(S)
1994–95	Div 2	46	13	11	22	49	69	50	19th	R2	R2	Football League Trophy	R1(S)
1995–96	Div 2	46	16	10	20	51	70	58	14th	R2	R2	Football League Trophy	R2(S)
1996–97	Div 2	46	15	15	16	43	45	60	16th	R1	R1	Football League Trophy	R1(S)
1997–98	Div 2	46	18	12	16	57	52	66	9th	R3	R1	Football League Trophy	RU
1998–99	Div 2	46	21	13	12	63	41	76	7th	R4	R3	Football League Trophy	QF(S)
1999–2000	Div 2	46	16	9	21	59	62	57	16th	R2	R3	Football League Trophy	QF(S)
2000–01	Div 2	46	20	13	13	79	55	73	7th	R3	R1	Football League Trophy	R2(S)
2001–02	Div 2 ↓	46	10	14	22	56	71	44	21st	R2	R1	Football League Trophy	R1(S)
2002–03	Div 3 ↑	46	20	14	12	60	48	74	4th (Note: Promoted via the play-offs.)	R4	R1	Football League Trophy League play-offs	SF(S) W
2003–04	Div 2	46	17	15	14	56	51	66	9th	R2	R1	Football League Trophy	R1(S)
2004–05	Lge 1 (Note: From the 2004–05 season, the Football League divisions were rebranded: Division One was renamed the Football League Championship, and Divisions Two and Three became Football League One and Football League Two respectively.)	46	20	10	16	77	64	70	8th	R4	R3	Football League Trophy	R1(S)
2005–06	Lge 1	46	12	19	15	49	53	55	17th	R1	R2	Football League Trophy	R2(S)
2006–07	Lge 1	46	13	13	20	50	64	52	19th	R2	R1	Football League Trophy	R2(S)
2007–08	Lge 1 ↓	46	17	7	22	62	72	48 (Note: Deducted 10 points for entering administration.)	21st	R2	R1	Football League Trophy	QF(S)
2008–09	Lge 2	46	17	12	17	59	51	46 (Note: Deducted 17 points for leaving administration without a Company Voluntary Agreement.)	21st	R2	R1	Football League Trophy	QF(S)
2009–10	Lge 2 ↑	46	25	8	13	61	44	83	2nd	R2	R1	Football League Trophy	R2(S)
2010–11	Lge 1	46	19	14	13	75	54	71	6th	R2	R1	Football League Trophy League play-offs	R1(S) SF
2011–12	Lge 1	46	15	13	18	48	52	58	11th	R1	R2	Football League Trophy	QF(S)
2012–13	Lge 1 ↑	46	24	11	11	76	53	83	2nd	R3	R1	Football League Trophy	R1(S)
2013–14	Champ	46	18	12	16	67	66	66	10th	R4	R2		
2014–15	Champ ↑	46	26	12	8	98	45	90	1st	R4	QF		
2015–16	Prem	38	11	9	18	45	67	42	16th	R5	R4		
2016–17	Prem	38	12	10	16	55	67	46	9th	R3	R3		
2017–18	Prem	38	11	11	16	45	61	44	12th	R3	QF		
2018–19	Prem	38	13	6	19	56	70	45	14th	R3	QF		
2019–20	Prem ↓	38	9	7	22	40	65	34	18th	R4	R3		
2020–21	Champ	46	22	11	13	73	46	77	6th	QF	R3	League play-offs	SF
2021–22	Champ ↑	46	25	13	8	74	39	88	2nd	R4	R2		
2022–23	Prem	38	11	6	21	37	71	39	15th	R3	R4		
2023–24	Prem	38	13	9	16	54	67	48	12th	R5	R4		
2024–25	Prem	38	15	11	12	58	46	56	9th	QF	R2		
2025–26	Prem	38	13	18	7	58	54	57	6th	R3	R2		

- Seasons spent at Level 1 of the football league system: 9
- Seasons spent at Level 2 of the football league system: 7
- Seasons spent at Level 3 of the football league system: 70 (Note: Includes a season abandoned as a result of the Second World War.)
- Seasons spent at Level 4 of the football league system: 11

== Key ==
- Pld – Matches played
- W – Matches won
- D – Matches drawn
- L – Matches lost
- GF – Goals for
- GA – Goals against
- Pts – Points
- Pos – Final position
- Prem – Premier League
- Champ – Football League Championship
- Lge 1 – Football League One
- Lge 2 – Football League Two
- Div 1 – Football League First Division
- Div 2 – Football League Second Division
- Div 3 – Football League Third Division
- Div 3S – Football League Third Division South
- Div 4 – Football League Fourth Division
- SL – Southern League
- HL – Hampshire League
- HLW – Hampshire League West
- n/a – Not applicable
- 6Q – Sixth qualifying round
- PR – Preliminary round
- R1 – First round
- R2 – Second round
- R3 – Third round
- R4 – Fourth round
- R5 – Fifth round
- QF – Quarter-finals
- SF – Semi-finals
- RU – Runners-up
- W – Winners
- (S) – Southern section of regionalised stage

Champions	Runners-up	Promoted ↑	Relegated ↓
