= 1999–2000 Football Conference =

Football Conference
- Season: 1999–2000
- Champions: Kidderminster Harriers (2nd Football Conference title)
- Direct promotion: Kidderminster Harriers
- Conference League Cup winners: Doncaster Rovers
- FA Trophy winners: Kingstonian (2nd FA Trophy title), 2nd successive
- Relegated to Level 6: Altrincham, Sutton United, Welling United
- Matches: 462
- Goals: 1,228 (2.66 per match)
- Top goalscorer: (England) Justin Jackson (Morecambe), 29
- Biggest home win: Rushden & Diamonds – Northwich Victoria 6–0 (29 January 2000)
- Biggest away win: Hayes – Rushden & Diamonds 0–5 (4 December 1999)
- Highest scoring: Morecambe – Sutton 6–2 (4 December 1999); Telford – Hednesford 6–2 (3 January 2000); Hereford – Doncaster 5–3 (4 September 1999); Hereford – Scarborough 4–4 (2 October 1999); Rushden & Diamonds – Kidderminster 5–3 (21 September 1999); Northwich Victoria – Kettering Town 2–6 (24 April 2000)
- Longest winning run: Kidderminster Harriers, Southport, Stevenage Borough, 6 matches
- Longest unbeaten run: Morecambe, 17 matches
- Longest losing run: Sutton, 7 matches
- Highest attendance: Kidderminster Harriers v Rushden & Diamonds, 6,250 (8 April 2000)
- Lowest attendance: Sutton v Scarborough, 460 (20 April 2000)
- Average attendance: 1,619 (– 0.47 compared to the previous season)

The Football Conference season of 1999–2000 was the twenty-first season of the Football Conference, also known as the Nationwide Conference for sponsorship reasons.

== Changes since the previous season ==
- Altrincham (promoted 1998–99)
- Nuneaton Borough (promoted 1998–99)
- Scarborough (relegated from the Football League 1998–99)
- Sutton United (promoted 1998–99)

== Locations ==
Locations of the Football Conference 1999–2000 teams
Locations of the Football Conference London teams 1999–2000

== Final league table ==
Pos	Team	Pld	W	D	L	GF	GA	GD	Pts	Promotion or relegation
1	Kidderminster Harriers (C, P)	42	26	7	9	75	40	+35	85	Promotion to the Football League Third Division
2	Rushden & Diamonds	42	21	13	8	71	42	+29	76	
3	Morecambe	42	18	16	8	70	48	+22	70	
4	Scarborough	42	19	12	11	60	35	+25	69	
5	Kingstonian	42	20	7	15	58	44	+14	67	
6	Dover Athletic	42	18	12	12	65	56	+9	66	
7	Yeovil Town	42	18	10	14	60	63	−3	64	
8	Hereford United	42	15	14	13	61	52	+9	59	
9	Southport	42	15	13	14	55	56	−1	58	
10	Stevenage Borough	42	16	9	17	60	54	+6	57	
11	Hayes	42	16	8	18	57	58	−1	56	
12	Doncaster Rovers	42	15	9	18	46	48	−2	54	
13	Kettering Town	42	12	16	14	44	50	−6	52	
14	Woking	42	13	13	16	45	53	−8	52	
15	Nuneaton Borough	42	12	15	15	49	53	−4	51	
16	Telford United	42	14	9	19	56	66	−10	51	
17	Hednesford Town	42	15	6	21	45	68	−23	51	
18	Northwich Victoria	42	13	12	17	53	78	−25	51	
19	Forest Green Rovers	42	13	8	21	54	63	−9	47	
20	Welling United (R)	42	13	8	21	54	66	−12	47	Relegation to the Southern League Premier Division
21	Altrincham (R)	42	9	19	14	51	60	−9	46	Relegation to the Northern Premier League Premier Division
22	Sutton United (R)	42	8	10	24	39	75	−36	34	Relegation to the Isthmian League Premier Division

(C) Champions; (P) Promoted; (R) Relegated

== Results ==
Home \ Away	ALT	DON	DOV	FGR	HAY	HED	HER	KET	KID	KIN	MOR	NOR	NUN	R&D	SCA	SOU	STB	SUT	TEL	WEL	WOK	YEO
Altrincham		1–2	3–0	1–1	1–2	0–1	2–1	1–1	0–0	1–3	2–2	2–0	2–2	1–2	2–1	3–0	0–1	3–0	3–3	0–1	1–1	2–2
Doncaster Rovers	0–1		0–1	3–2	0–0	2–1	2–2	2–1	1–2	1–0	0–1	2–0	0–1	0–1	0–1	1–1	1–2	1–0	2–0	1–1	0–0	0–3
Dover Athletic	2–2	1–3		4–0	2–2	4–1	2–0	1–1	0–1	0–1	3–1	4–1	3–1	0–4	1–1	1–1	4–2	1–1	3–0	2–1	2–2	3–0
Forest Green Rovers	1–1	1–0	3–1		0–1	3–0	0–1	2–0	3–2	0–3	1–2	4–1	1–2	1–0	0–1	1–0	3–2	1–2	5–2	1–2	0–0	3–0
Hayes	1–1	3–4	1–2	3–0		2–1	0–0	0–1	2–0	1–2	0–1	2–1	3–0	0–5	0–1	0–2	1–2	1–0	1–2	1–0	0–0	2–3
Hednesford Town	5–0	2–1	1–0	1–0	2–1		0–1	1–1	0–2	2–3	1–3	1–0	0–0	1–2	0–3	1–2	2–2	1–0	2–1	0–1	3–0	1–0
Hereford United	2–2	5–3	2–0	1–0	0–2	3–0		4–2	1–1	0–2	1–1	3–0	1–1	4–0	4–4	2–1	1–2	4–1	2–2	1–2	2–4	0–1
Kettering Town	0–0	2–2	1–2	1–0	1–1	4–2	2–0		3–1	2–1	1–1	1–1	1–1	1–1	0–0	0–3	1–0	1–0	0–0	2–1	0–0	1–2
Kidderminster Harriers	1–1	1–0	1–2	3–3	2–1	3–0	1–1	1–0		2–0	2–1	3–1	1–2	2–0	2–0	5–0	3–1	1–0	2–0	4–1	3–2	4–0
Kingstonian	2–2	0–1	4–1	0–1	1–3	0–2	0–0	2–0	0–1		0–0	3–3	2–0	0–1	2–0	4–2	1–0	4–2	4–2	1–0	0–2	0–1
Morecambe	3–3	1–1	2–0	1–1	1–4	4–0	3–2	2–1	0–1	1–2		5–0	1–1	0–0	0–1	3–3	3–3	6–2	5–2	2–1	1–0	1–1
Northwich Victoria	1–1	2–1	1–1	0–0	0–0	3–2	0–0	2–6	1–1	0–3	0–0		3–1	2–1	2–0	0–1	3–3	2–0	2–1	3–2	3–1	3–0
Nuneaton Borough	3–1	0–0	0–2	2–3	2–1	3–0	0–1	0–1	2–3	2–0	1–1	3–1		1–1	1–1	0–2	0–1	2–0	1–1	4–3	0–1	1–1
Rushden & Diamonds	1–0	0–0	1–1	3–2	1–0	1–1	0–0	2–0	5–3	1–0	0–2	6–0	1–1		0–0	4–2	2–1	4–0	1–1	2–0	1–3	1–1
Scarborough	1–0	0–0	1–2	5–0	4–1	1–1	3–0	0–0	0–0	0–1	0–2	3–0	1–1	0–1		3–0	1–3	3–0	2–0	0–0	3–2	5–0
Southport	2–0	1–0	1–2	2–1	4–1	2–0	0–1	0–1	0–1	0–0	1–1	0–1	2–0	2–1	2–2		2–1	1–1	1–3	3–2	4–1	1–1
Stevenage Borough	1–1	3–0	3–1	1–1	3–0	0–1	0–3	3–0	0–2	0–1	1–2	3–1	2–1	2–2	0–1	1–1		1–0	2–0	0–1	0–1	0–0
Sutton United	3–0	1–0	0–1	3–2	2–2	0–0	1–1	1–1	0–3	2–2	0–1	2–2	1–2	0–4	1–2	1–1	0–2		2–1	2–3	1–1	0–1
Telford United	0–1	0–2	1–1	2–0	1–2	6–2	1–1	3–1	3–2	1–0	3–2	0–1	1–0	1–1	1–0	0–0	2–1	2–0		2–1	1–2	3–1
Welling United	2–2	0–1	1–1	1–1	1–2	1–2	3–1	1–0	1–2	0–1	0–0	1–3	0–0	0–3	2–1	4–1	2–1	2–3	2–0		1–2	2–5
Woking	0–1	1–3	2–0	2–1	0–3	0–1	0–2	1–1	1–0	1–1	0–0	1–1	1–1	1–3	0–2	0–0	0–2	1–2	1–0	2–3		2–0
Yeovil Town	3–0	1–3	1–1	1–0	2–4	3–0	1–0	2–0	1–0	3–2	2–0	3–2	1–3	5–1	1–2	1–1	2–2	1–2	2–1	1–1	0–3	

Updated to match(es) played on unknown. Source:
Legend: Blue = home team win; Yellow = draw; Red = away team win.

== Top scorers in order of league goals ==
Rank	Player	Club	League	FA Cup	FA Trophy	League Cup	Total
1	(England) Justin Jackson	Morecambe	29	1	1	0	31
2	(England) Carl Alford	Stevenage Borough	24	0	1	1	26
3	(England) Neil Davis	Hednesford	18	1	2	0	21
4	(England) Lee Furlong	Southport	17				
5	(England) Joff Vansittart	Dover Athletic	15	0	4	0	19
6	(England) Ian Arnold	Southport	14	1	3	0	18
=	(England) Kevin Ellison	Altrincham	14	1	0	0	15
8	(England) Steve Brodie	Scarborough	13	0	2	1	16
=	(England) Lee Charles	Hayes	13	5	0	0	18
=	(England) Robin Elmes	Hereford United	13	1	1	0	15
=	(England) Paul Fewings	Hereford United	13	2	0	0	15
=	(England) Warren Patmore	Yeovil Town	13	0	2	2	17
13	(Algeria) Nassim Akrour	Woking	12	0	3	2	17
=	(England) Stewart Hadley	Kidderminster Harriers	12	0	0	0	12
=	(England) Ritchie Hanlon	Welling United	12	0	1	1	4
=	(England) Richard Landon	Altrincham	12	1	1	0	14
=	(England) David Leworthy	Kingstonian	12	2	2	1	17
=	(England) Marc McGregor	Forest Green Rovers	12	1	1	0	14
=	(England) Val Owen	Northwich Victoria	12	1	0	0	13
20	(England) Darren Collins	Rushden & Diamonds	11	2	2	0	15
=	(England) Phil Eastwood	Morecambe	11	0	2	0	13
=	(England) Lee Elam	Southport	11	0	1	0	12
=	(Republic of Ireland) Mike McElhatton	Rushden & Diamonds	11	2	0	0	13
=	(England) Zeke Rowe	Welling United	11	0	0	0	11
=	(England) Dave Stevens	Hayes	11	0	0	0	11
=	(England) Mark Watson	Sutton	11	0	1	0	12

- Footballtransfers.co.uk, thefootballarchives.com and Soccerbase contain information on many players
  on whom there is not yet an article in Wikipedia.
