= Steve Fletcher =

English footballer (born 1972)

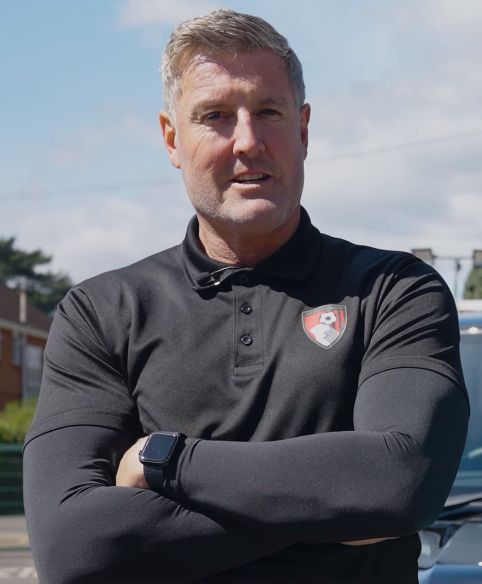
- Fletcher in 2024

Personal information
- Full name: Steven Mark Fletcher
- Date of birth: 26 July 1972 (age 54)
- Place of birth: Hartlepool, England
- Height: 6 ft 2 in (1.88 m)
- Position: Forward

Team information
- Current team: AFC Bournemouth (coach)

Senior career*
Years	Team	Apps	(Gls)
1990–1992	Hartlepool United	32	(4)
1992–2007	AFC Bournemouth	493	(88)
2007–2008	Chesterfield	38	(5)
2008–2009	Crawley Town	21	(2)
2009–2013	AFC Bournemouth	135	(15)
2012	→ Plymouth Argyle (loan)	6	(0)
Total		725	(114)
- * Club domestic league appearances and goals

Steven Mark Fletcher (born 26 July 1972) is an English retired footballer who played as a forward for AFC Bournemouth, where he holds the club record for appearances and is currently an assistant manager for the Premier League side.

Fletcher began his career at Hartlepool United and made his first team debut in 1990. Two years later, he moved to AFC Bournemouth, where he would play for the next 15 seasons, scoring 88 league goals in 493 appearances. Fletcher joined Chesterfield in 2007 and spent one season with the club before moving to Crawley Town. Fletcher returned to Bournemouth in 2009 and became the club's assistant manager in 2011. Having resigned from that position eleven months later, he went on to have his first loan spell, spending a month with Plymouth Argyle. Fletcher has been described as a target man, due to his large figure and heading ability.

== Career ==
Fletcher began his career at Hartlepool United before leaving for AFC Bournemouth in 1992 for £30,000. He spent 15 years with Bournemouth, recording more than 600 appearance caps and 100 goals. He holds the Bournemouth club record for most league appearances, having played 628 league matches for the club across two spells. Fletcher was released by Bournemouth, then managed by Kevin Bond, at the end of the 2006–07 season. He subsequently joined recently relegated League Two side Chesterfield. At the end of the 2007–08 season, Fletcher turned down a contract renewal with Chesterfield due to family commitments.

He joined Crawley Town on a free transfer on 23 May 2008, signing an initial one-year contract. Eight months later, Fletcher returned to Bournemouth on a contract until the end of the 2008–09 campaign with an option to extend it for another season. He made his 500th league appearance for the club on 24 February in a 1–0 win at Dagenham & Redbridge. In April 2010, Bournemouth renamed the North Stand at Dean Court after him in recognition of his achievements with the club. Two months later, Fletcher signed a one-year contract extension after helping the club win promotion to League One.

Fletcher was appointed assistant manager to Lee Bradbury in January 2011 after Eddie Howe left the club to manage Burnley, signing a 2 1/2-year contract. He scored his 100th league goal for Bournemouth in a 3–3 draw at Peterborough United on 1 April 2011 and said that helping the club win promotion to the Championship would be a perfect milestone for him. Bournemouth qualified for the play-offs, but were eliminated by Huddersfield Town on penalties. Fletcher resigned from his position as assistant manager in November, saying that it would be more beneficial for the team and the club if he focused on playing for the remainder of his contract.

Having been restricted to brief substitute appearances since resigning as Bradbury's assistant, the manager said that he would consider allowing Fletcher to join another club on loan in January 2012, but insisted he was still part of his plans. Two months later, he joined Plymouth Argyle on loan until the end of the season, reuniting him with former teammate Carl Fletcher, who was now Plymouth's manager. "Me and Carl are good friends and go back years. He's been in touch and trying to get me to Plymouth for a short period of time, it had come to deadline day and I needed to make a decision," said Fletcher. "It's the only club I would contemplate going to because Carl is a close friend, if it hadn't been him I wouldn't have even thought about it."

Fletcher made his debut in a 1–0 win against Bradford City on 31 March, and appeared in five more matches, including two in the starting eleven, as the club secured their future in League Two after a turbulent season. Following Argyle's 2–2 draw at Morecambe, Fletcher was recalled by Bournemouth caretaker manager Paul Groves ahead of the final league match of the campaign.

At the end of the 2012–13 season, Fletcher announced his retirement from playing; with Bournemouth in the Championship he felt the time was right to hang up his boots and seek another role within the club.

Shortly after his playing career ended, it was revealed that newly promoted Conference South side Gosport Borough had enquired about Fletcher's availability; however, nothing had come of this move as the club could not afford to sign him.

In June 2013 it was announced Fletcher would stay at Bournemouth as a scout.

In March 2014, Fletcher was the recipient of the Sir Tom Finney Award by the Football League.

After his retirement, Fletcher joined Bournemouth as a scout. He later moved into the role of assistant coach, and also works for the club as an ambassador.

== Personal life ==
His grandfather, Jack Howe, played in the Football League for several clubs and was capped three times by the England national team.

== Career statistics ==
Appearances and goals by club, season and competition
Club	Season	League			FA Cup		League Cup		FL Trophy/ FA Trophy		Play Offs		Total	
Club	Season	Division	Apps	Goals	Apps	Goals	Apps	Goals	Apps	Goals	Apps	Goals	Apps	Goals
Hartlepool United	1990–91	Fourth Division	14	2	1	0	0	0	1	0	0	0	16	2
Hartlepool United	1991–92	Third Division	18	2	2	0	2	1	3	1	0	0	25	4
Hartlepool United	Total		32	4	3	0	2	1	4	1	0	0	41	6
AFC Bournemouth	1992–93	Second Division	31	4	0	0	2	0	2	0	0	0	35	4
AFC Bournemouth	1993–94	Second Division	36	6	2	0	4	1	1	0	0	0	43	7
AFC Bournemouth	1994–95	Second Division	40	6	0	0	4	0	1	0	0	0	45	6
AFC Bournemouth	1995–96	Second Division	7	1	2	0	1	0	1	0	0	0	11	1
AFC Bournemouth	1996–97	Second Division	35	7	1	0	2	1	0	0	0	0	38	8
AFC Bournemouth	1997–98	Second Division	42	12	3	1	2	0	6	1	0	0	53	14
AFC Bournemouth	1998–99	Second Division	39	8	3	0	4	1	3	2	0	0	49	11
AFC Bournemouth	1999–2000	Second Division	36	7	3	2	5	0	0	0	0	0	44	9
AFC Bournemouth	2000–01	Second Division	45	9	3	0	2	0	1	0	0	0	51	9
AFC Bournemouth	2001–02	Second Division	2	0	1	1	0	0	0	0	0	0	3	1
AFC Bournemouth	2002–03	Third Division	35	5	6	2	0	0	4	1	3	1	49	9
AFC Bournemouth	2003–04	Second Division	41	9	3	0	1	0	1	0	0	0	46	9
AFC Bournemouth	2004–05	League One	36	9	3	1	1	0	0	0	0	0	40	10
AFC Bournemouth	2005–06	League One	27	4	0	0	1	0	1	0	0	0	29	4
AFC Bournemouth	2006–07	League One	41	1	3	2	1	1	0	0	0	0	45	4
AFC Bournemouth	Total		493	88	33	9	30	4	21	4	3	1	580	106
Chesterfield	2007–08	League Two	38	5	1	0	0	0	0	0	0	0	39	5
Crawley Town	2008–09	Conference National	21	2	0	0	0	0	3	1	0	0	24	3
AFC Bournemouth	2008–09	League Two	21	4	0	0	0	0	0	0	0	0	21	4
AFC Bournemouth	2009–10	League Two	45	4	2	0	1	0	0	0	0	0	48	4
AFC Bournemouth	2010–11	League One	38	6	2	1	0	0	0	0	1	0	41	7
AFC Bournemouth	2011–12	League One	20	1	1	0	1	0	2	0	0	0	24	1
AFC Bournemouth	Total		124	15	5	1	2	0	2	0	1	0	134	16
Plymouth Argyle (loan)	2011–12	League Two	6	0	0	0	0	0	0	0	0	0	6	0
AFC Bournemouth	2012–13	League One	11	0	1	0	0	0	0	0	0	0	12	0
Career total			725	114	43	10	34	5	30	6	4	1	836	136

== Honours ==
Bournemouth

- Football League Third Division play-offs: 2003
- Football League Trophy runner-up: 1997–98

Individual

- Sir Tom Finney Award: 2014
