= Neil Young (footballer, born 1973) =

English footballer (born 1973)

Personal information
- Full name: Neil Anthony Young
- Date of birth: 31 August 1973 (age 53)
- Place of birth: Harlow, England
- Height: 5 ft 9 in (1.75 m)
- Position: Defender

Youth career
- ?–1991: Tottenham Hotspur

Senior career*
Years	Team	Apps	(Gls)
1991–1994	Tottenham Hotspur	0	(0)
1994–2008	AFC Bournemouth	430	(3)
2007	→ Weymouth (loan)	3	(0)
2009–2011	Cumberland United	48	(0)
Total		481	(3)
- * Club domestic league appearances and goals

Neil Anthony Young (born 31 August 1973) is a former professional footballer who played as a defender. He is an older brother of footballer Luke Young.

== Career ==
Young was born in Harlow. He played over 400 league games for AFC Bournemouth, some as captain, after joining in 1994 from Tottenham Hotspur. He played primarily at right-back although played at centre-back in the latter part of his Bournemouth career. Young was considered an attacking full back who would often support the right winger. He received a testimonial in 2005 against his brother's Charlton Athletic side.

On 2 November 2007, he signed a one-month loan deal at Weymouth, linking up with former Bournemouth teammate Jason Tindall. He had his loan extended to a second month, although he was recalled by Bournemouth soon after.

At the end of the 2007–08 season he left England and moved to Australia after over 14 years' service for the club. In 2009, he signed with South Australian Premier League club Cumberland United.

== Career statistics ==
Appearances and goals by club, season and competition
Club	Season	League			FA Cup		League Cup		Continental		Total	
Club	Season	Division	Apps	Goals	Apps	Goals	Apps	Goals	Apps	Goals	Apps	Goals
AFC Bournemouth	1994–95	Second Division	32	0	0	0	0	0	0	0	32	0
AFC Bournemouth	1995–96	Second Division	41	0	3	0	3	0	0	0	47	0
AFC Bournemouth	1996–97	Second Division	44	0	1	0	2	0	0	0	47	0
AFC Bournemouth	1997–98	Second Division	44	2	3	0	2	0	0	0	49	2
AFC Bournemouth	1998–99	Second Division	44	1	4	0	5	0	0	0	53	1
AFC Bournemouth	1999–2000	Second Division	37	0	3	0	5	0	0	0	45	0
AFC Bournemouth	2000–01	Second Division	7	0	0	0	2	0	0	0	9	0
AFC Bournemouth	2001–02	Second Division	11	0	0	0	0	0	0	0	11	0
AFC Bournemouth	2002–03	Third Division	34	0	5	0	1	0	0	0	40	0
AFC Bournemouth	2003–04	Second Division	10	0	0	0	0	0	0	0	10	0
AFC Bournemouth	2004–05	League One	30	0	4	0	2	0	0	0	36	0
AFC Bournemouth	2005–06	League One	42	0	1	0	2	0	0	0	45	0
AFC Bournemouth	2006–07	League One	34	0	3	0	0	0	0	0	37	0
AFC Bournemouth	2007–08	League One	21	0	0	0	1	0	0	0	22	0
AFC Bournemouth	Total		431	3	27	0	25	0	0	0	483	3
Weymouth (loan)	2007–08	Conference National	3	0	2	0	0	0	0	0	5	0
Career total			434	3	29	0	25	0	0	0	488	3

== Honours ==
Bournemouth

- Football League Third Division play-offs: 2003
- Football League Trophy runner-up: 1997–98
