= Eddie Howe =

English football manager and player (born 1977)

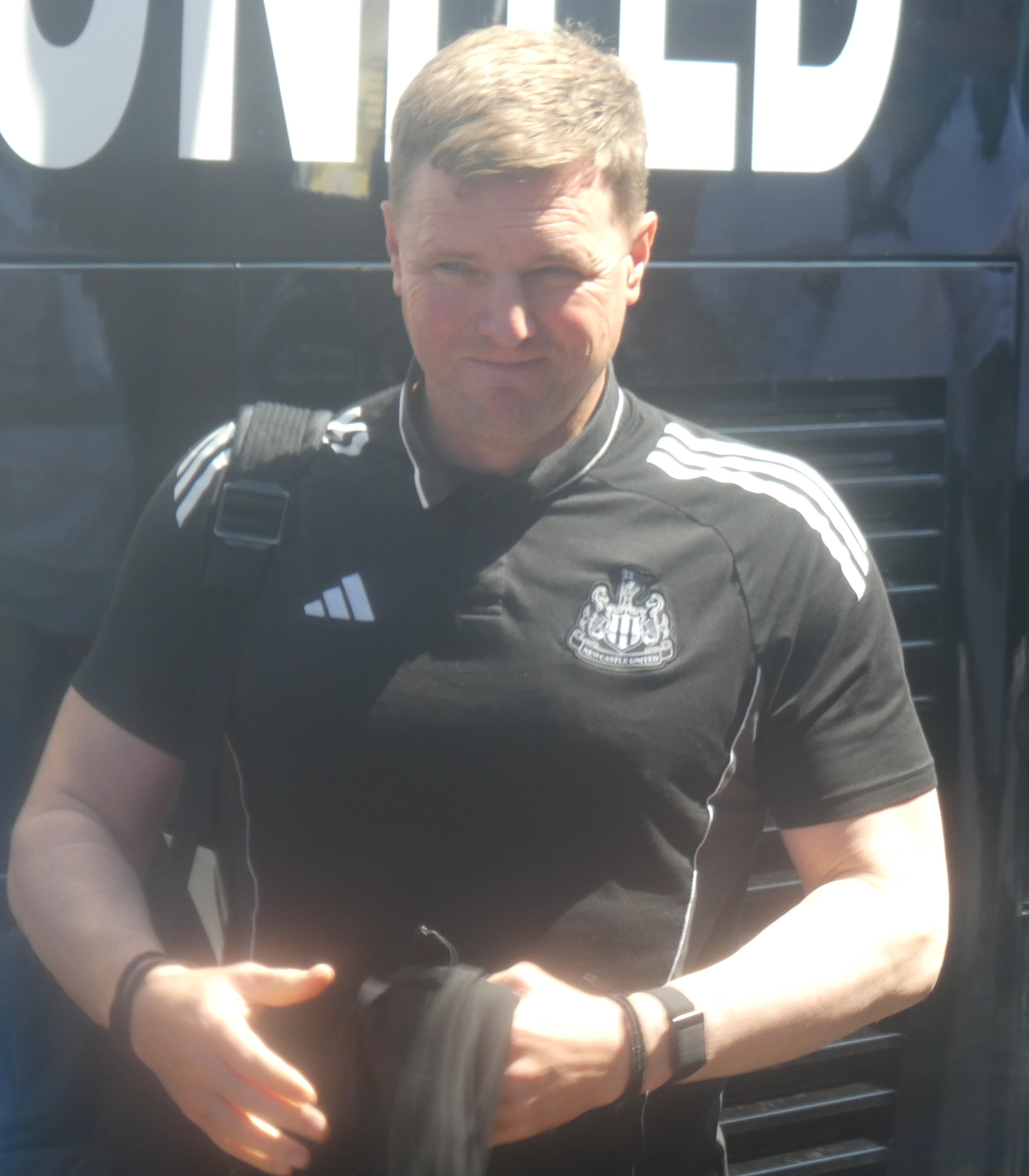
- Howe in 2026

Personal information
- Full name: Edward John Frank Howe
- Date of birth: 29 November 1977 (age 48)
- Place of birth: Amersham, England
- Height: 5 ft 10 in (1.78 m)
- Position: Centre-back

Youth career
- –1994: Bournemouth

Senior career*
Years	Team	Apps	(Gls)
1994–2002	Bournemouth	200	(10)
2002–2004	Portsmouth	2	(0)
2004	→ Swindon Town (loan)	0	(0)
2004	→ Bournemouth (loan)	17	(1)
2004–2007	Bournemouth	53	(1)
Total		272	(12)

International career
1998	England U21	2	(0)

Managerial career
- 2008–2011: Bournemouth
- 2011–2012: Burnley
- 2012–2020: Bournemouth
- 2021–2026: Newcastle United
- * Club domestic league appearances and goals

Edward John Frank Howe (born 29 November 1977) is an English professional football manager and former player who was most recently the head coach of Premier League club Newcastle United.

A centre-back during his playing career, Howe spent most of his playing career with Bournemouth, coming up through the youth system and spending eight years with the club, before returning for a second three-year spell to end his career, and retiring from the professional game in 2007. He entered management the following year, taking charge of a Bournemouth side facing relegation to the Conference National (now National League) in January 2009 as the youngest manager in the Football League. Under his guidance, Bournemouth were able to avoid relegation during his first season in charge, having started the season on minus 17 points, and were promoted to League One the following campaign.

After a brief spell as manager at Burnley, Howe returned to Bournemouth, and led them to two further promotions in three seasons, taking them to the top division of English football. He was subsequently named Football League Manager of the Decade in 2015 following three promotions in a seven-year period. Bournemouth survived in the Premier League for the next five seasons under Howe, before suffering relegation to the Championship in 2020. He resigned as manager of Bournemouth after the club's relegation. At the time of his departure, Howe was the longest-serving manager in the Premier League.

After a year away from the game, Howe returned to management in 2021 when he was appointed as head coach of Newcastle United following the takeover of the club. In 2025, he delivered a first major trophy for Newcastle in 56 years by winning the EFL Cup. He ultimately resigned as head coach on 31 July 2026 after nearly five years in charge, citing that he felt mentally and physically drained following a frustrating summer transfer window.

== Playing career ==
Howe was born in Amersham, Buckinghamshire. When very young, he moved to Verwood in Dorset, and later began his footballing career with local youth teams Phoenix Sports YFC, later to be known as Verwood Town YFC and Parley Sports before starting his professional career at Bournemouth. He made his first-team debut in December 1995 against Hull City. Howe established himself as an important player in Bournemouth's defence, and in 1998, he was selected for the England Under-21 team in the Toulon Tournament.

In March 2002, Portsmouth signed Howe for £400,000, making him new manager Harry Redknapp's first signing. Shortly after signing, a knee injury on his debut against Preston North End ended his season.

He returned for the opening game of the 2002–03 season against Nottingham Forest, but he injured his knee again after only nine minutes and was ruled out for the entire campaign. He did not return to full fitness until January 2004 after 18 months out. He was loaned to Swindon Town on transfer deadline day in March, although he did not feature for the club.

Portsmouth loaned Howe back to Bournemouth for the first three months of the 2004–05 season. He proved to be successful on his return to his first club after two injury-ravaged seasons with Portsmouth. With the club in a very poor financial state, supporters joined to create "Eddieshare" to fund a transfer fee. Days later, £21,000 was raised to fund the required permanent transfer fee. After a further three seasons and over 270 appearances, injuries forced his retirement as a player in 2007 and he then moved into coaching with the reserve squad.

== Managerial career ==
=== Bournemouth ===
In December 2006, at the age of 29, Howe was promoted to the position of player-coach by manager Kevin Bond, and handed the task of coaching Bournemouth's reserve team, though he continued to play in the first team. He retired from football in summer 2007, after he was unable to recover from a knee injury. In September 2008, Howe lost his job when Bond was dismissed as manager.

Howe returned to Bournemouth as a youth coach under Jimmy Quinn and took over as caretaker manager on 31 December 2008 when Quinn was dismissed. Even though his two games in charge as caretaker manager were away defeats, he was hired as the permanent manager of the club on 19 January 2009 and brought the club out of the relegation zone despite them having begun the season with a 17-point deduction.

In the start of the 2009–10 season, Howe won eight out of the nine games, a club record. In November 2009, Championship club Peterborough United approached Howe to replace Darren Ferguson as their manager but Howe rejected their approach.

Despite the club's transfer embargo remaining in place for the rest of the season, Bournemouth secured promotion to League One after two years in the fourth tier of English football thanks to a 2–0 away win at Burton Albion on 24 April 2010.

In early 2011, Howe was approached by several other clubs but on 11 January announced that he was staying at Bournemouth. However, on 14 January 2011, Howe became the new Burnley manager after the club agreed a compensation deal with Bournemouth. He took charge of his 100th and final Bournemouth match of his first managerial spell with the club, later that day in a 2–1 defeat away to Colchester United.

=== Burnley ===
On 16 January 2011, Howe was announced as the new manager of Burnley after signing a three-and-a-half-year contract at the Championship club. His first game in charge of Burnley was away to Scunthorpe on 22 January 2011, which ended in a 0–0 draw. Burnley finished eighth in the Championship in season 2010–11 and 13th in season 2011–12 under Howe. He left Burnley in October 2012 citing "personal reasons" for his departure.

=== Return to Bournemouth ===
In October 2012, he re-joined his former club Bournemouth as manager. He won the League One Manager of the Month for November after guiding the club to three league wins and two draws, as well as an FA Cup victory. On 20 April 2013, he secured promotion to the Championship with Bournemouth finishing runners-up and one point behind champions Doncaster Rovers. In the 2013–14 season, Howe's Bournemouth finished tenth in the Championship, six points outside of the play-off positions.

On 19 April 2015, Howe was selected as the Manager of the Decade at the Football League Awards.

On 27 April 2015, he secured Bournemouth's promotion to the Premier League. Bournemouth beat Bolton Wanderers 3–0 at the Goldsands Stadium, a win which while not guaranteeing Premier League football for the 2015–16 season, required third placed side Middlesbrough to overcome a 19-goal goal difference with one game left in the season. Howe said of the promotion and of Bournemouth supporters: "It shouldn't be them thanking me, it should be me thanking them. It is a family club and deserves its moment in the sun." Bournemouth confirmed their promotion on the last day of the season, 2 May 2015, with a 3–0 victory at Charlton Athletic and, due to already-promoted Watford's failure to win their last match, were crowned champions of the league.

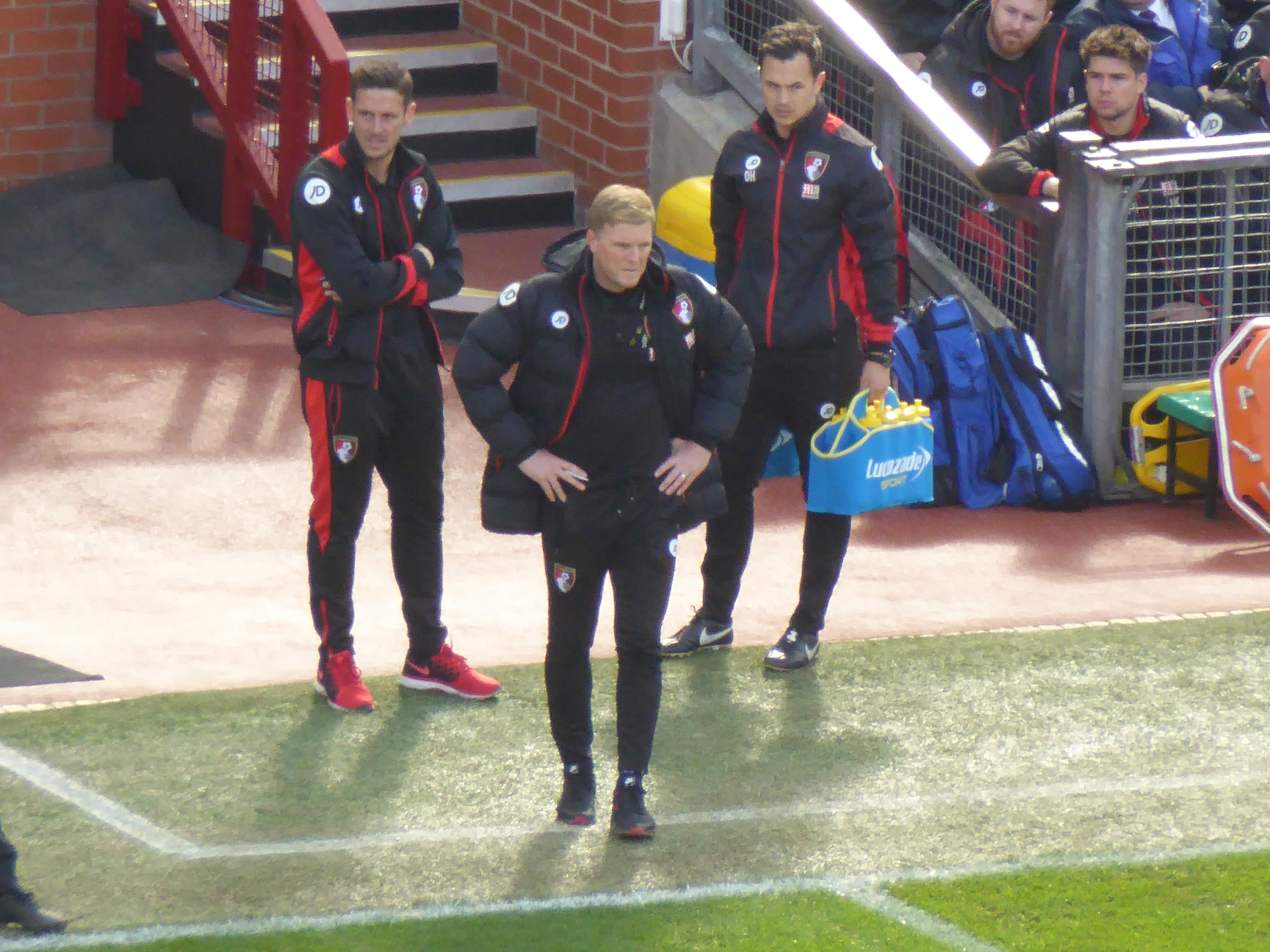
Howe managing Bournemouth in 2017

Howe guided Bournemouth to Premier League survival in their first season in the top flight football, with a 16th-place finish seeing them five points clear of the relegation zone. An even better campaign in 2016–17 saw Bournemouth finish ninth. A year later, he took them to 12th place in the Premier League to secure a fourth consecutive campaign at this level.

Howe's side finished in 14th in the 2018–19 Premier League, but the club's five-year stay in the Premier League ended in 2019–20 after Bournemouth finished in 18th place.

On 1 August 2020, Bournemouth announced that Howe had left the club by mutual consent, after eight years in charge. He became noted at Bournemouth for bringing in young players, improving them, and selling them on at a financial profit.

In May 2021, Howe rejected an offer to become the manager of Celtic. A club statement blamed factors "outwith both his and our control" for the breakdown in their negotiations.

=== Newcastle United ===
Howe was appointed to replace Steve Bruce as the manager of Premier League club Newcastle United on 8 November 2021, signing a contract until the summer of 2024. Howe watched from the stands as the club drew 1–1 with Brighton & Hove Albion, in a game in which Graeme Jones was acting as caretaker manager. Jones was retained as first team assistant coach as part of Howe's new coaching staff, which also included Jason Tindall, Stephen Purches and Simon Weatherstone, whom he worked with at Bournemouth, as well as retained Newcastle goalkeeping coach Simon Smith.

His appointment at Newcastle also reunited him with former players at Bournemouth, such as Callum Wilson, Matt Ritchie and Ryan Fraser. On 19 November 2021, Newcastle announced that Howe had tested positive for COVID-19 and would miss the first game in charge. He watched his first game as manager from a hotel room as Newcastle drew 3–3 with Brentford on 20 November.

On 20 April 2022, following a 1–0 victory against Crystal Palace, Howe guided Newcastle to a sixth successive home win, the first time the club had achieved such a feat since 2004 under Sir Bobby Robson. He guided Newcastle to an eleventh place finish in the Premier League after winning twelve in the last 18 games of the season, and made sure Newcastle became the first team in Premier League history to avoid relegation after not winning any of the first 14 games they played. On 5 August 2022, Howe was rewarded with a long-term contract at the club.

On 31 January 2023, Howe guided Newcastle to the EFL Cup final following a 3–1 aggregate victory over Southampton; their first cup final in over 23 years.

On 22 May 2023, following a goalless home draw against Leicester City, Howe guided Newcastle to a top-four finish in the Premier League and qualification for the UEFA Champions League, their first entry into the competition since 2002–03.

In the Champions League, Newcastle United finished bottom of their group with five points, failing to qualify for both the round of 16 and the Europa League, despite beating French Ligue 1 champions Paris-Saint-Germain 4–1 in Newcastle's first home Champions League match in 20 years.

On 6 January 2024, in the third round of FA Cup, in the 157th Tyne-Wear derby, Howe led Newcastle to victory over Sunderland, a 3–0 win at the Stadium of Light. This marked Newcastle's first win over the Black Cats since 2011.

Despite many injuries, Howe guided Newcastle to their highest ever scoring Premier League season with 85 goals scored and finished seventh; losing out on a Europa Conference League qualification spot due to Manchester United beating Manchester City 2–1 in the 2024 FA Cup final.

On 5 February 2025, Howe guided Newcastle to another EFL Cup final following a 4–0 aggregate victory over Arsenal, the first leg of the tie bringing Newcastle their first win at the Emirates since 2010. Newcastle went on to beat Liverpool in the final on 16 March 2025, with goals from Dan Burn and Alexander Isak. This win meant Newcastle had ended their 56-year wait for a trophy. Howe was the first English manager to win one of the country's major honours since Harry Redknapp won the 2008 FA Cup final for Portsmouth, and the first to lift the League Cup since Steve McClaren for Middlesbrough in 2004.

On 13 April 2025, Howe would miss his second match for the club, as he was admitted to hospital with an illness the previous day. Then on 14 April 2025, it was confirmed Howe would be receiving treatment for pneumonia and would now miss a further two matches. He returned on 26 April 2025 and secured Champions League qualification again.

On 30 July 2026, it was reported that Howe was set to depart Newcastle after nearly five years in charge of the club, having finished 12th in his final season. The following day, Newcastle confirmed Howe had stepped down as manager.

== Managerial style ==
Howe completed his coaching badges with the Irish FA in 2011, implementing a tactically flexible system with the teams that he manages. Howe's coaching style has been influenced by such football managers as Jürgen Klopp, Johan Cruyff, and Diego Simeone, the last of whom Howe observed in training after leaving Bournemouth. Many of Howe's man-management techniques have been influenced by John Wooden, former American college basketball coach.

Tactically, Howe prefers a 4–3–3 in possession, switching to a 4–5–1 out of possession, with an emphasis placed on pressing the opposition's defence, resulting in a higher amount of quick-turnovers. During the 2023–24 Premier League season, Newcastle United had increased defensive injuries, forcing Howe to use 3–4–2–1 and 4–4–2, however this meant that the team produced their highest ever goal scoring campaign, netting 85 goals in 38 games.

== Personal life ==
Howe and his wife Vicki have three sons. On 5 March 2019, Howe was awarded the Freedom of the Borough of Bournemouth by Bournemouth Borough Council. His childhood club was Everton. During the 2020 coronavirus pandemic, Howe became the first Premier League manager to take a pay cut. His half brother, Steve Lovell, is a scout at Bournemouth, and his nephew, Andy Howe, is Assistant Head of First Team Recruitment at Newcastle United.

== Career statistics ==
Appearances and goals by club, season and competition
Club	Season	League			FA Cup		League Cup		Other		Total	
Club	Season	Division	Apps	Goals	Apps	Goals	Apps	Goals	Apps	Goals	Apps	Goals
Bournemouth	1995–96	Second Division	5	0	0	0	0	0	0	0	5	0
Bournemouth	1996–97	Second Division	13	0	0	0	0	0	0	0	13	0
Bournemouth	1997–98	Second Division	40	1	3	0	2	0	5 (Note: Appearances in Football League Trophy)	0	50	1
Bournemouth	1998–99	Second Division	45	2	4	2	4	1	3	0	46	5
Bournemouth	1999–2000	Second Division	28	1	0	0	5	0	0	0	33	1
Bournemouth	2000–01	Second Division	31	2	3	0	1	0	0	0	35	2
Bournemouth	2001–02	Second Division	38	4	2	0	1	0	1	0	42	4
Bournemouth	Total		200	10	12	2	13	1	9	0	234	13
Portsmouth	2001–02	First Division	1	0	0	0	0	0	–		1	0
Portsmouth	2002–03	First Division	1	0	0	0	0	0	–		1	0
Portsmouth	Total		2	0	0	0	0	0	–		2	0
Swindon Town (loan)	2003–04	Second Division	0	0	0	0	0	0	0	0	0	0
Bournemouth	2004–05	League One	35	1	3	0	2	0	0	0	40	1
Bournemouth	2005–06	League One	20	0	0	0	0	0	0	0	20	0
Bournemouth	2006–07	League One	15	1	1	0	0	0	0	0	16	1
Bournemouth	Total		70	2	4	0	2	0	0	0	76	2
Career total			272	12	16	2	15	1	9	0	312	15

== Managerial statistics ==
As of match played 24 May 2026

Managerial record by team and tenure
Team	From	To	Record					Ref.
Team	From	To	P	W	D	L	Win %	Ref.
Bournemouth	31 December 2008	16 January 2011	102	51	18	33	50.0	
Burnley	16 January 2011	12 October 2012	87	34	19	34	39.1	
Bournemouth	12 October 2012	1 August 2020	356	143	77	136	40.2	
Newcastle United	8 November 2021	30 July 2026	231	112	48	71	48.5	
Total			776	340	162	274	43.8	

== Honours ==
=== As a player ===
Bournemouth

- Football League Trophy runner-up: 1997–98

=== As a manager ===
Bournemouth

- Football League Championship: 2014–15
- Football League One second-place promotion: 2012–13
- Football League Two second-place promotion: 2009–10

Newcastle United

- EFL Cup: 2024–25; runner-up: 2022–23

Individual

- Football League One Manager of the Month: November 2012, April 2013
- Football League Championship Manager of the Month: October 2014, March 2015
- The Football League Manager of the Decade
- LMA Manager of the Year: 2015
- LMA Championship Manager of the Year: 2014–15
- Premier League Manager of the Month: March 2017, January 2018, October 2018, February 2022, October 2022
- Doctor of Civil Law, Northumbria University
