= Paul Teather =

English footballer

Personal information
- Date of birth: 26 December 1977 (age 48)
- Place of birth: Rotherham, England
- Positions: Defender; midfielder

Youth career
- 1994–1996: Manchester United

Senior career*
Years	Team	Apps	(Gls)
1996–2001	Manchester United	0	(0)
1997–1998	→ AFC Bournemouth (loan)	11	(0)
2002–2003	Northwich Victoria	7	(1)
Total		18	(1)
- * Club domestic league appearances and goals

Paul Teather (born 26 December 1977 in Rotherham, South Yorkshire, England) is an English retired footballer who played in defence and midfield.

== Career ==
Teather started his footballing career after taking a place at Lilleshall school of sporting excellence aged 14. While there, he played for the England national team at under-15 level, receiving his first cap for representing his country in an international game.

He begin his career as an apprentice with Manchester United upon leaving school in 1994, and turned professional in 1996. He remained at the club until being released on a free transfer in 2001.

In 1997–98, he was loaned out to Division Two side AFC Bournemouth, but his spell at Dean Court was curtailed by a triple cheekbone fracture.

After leaving Old Trafford, Teather had a spell with Northwich Victoria in the Nationwide Conference.

== After football ==
Following his retirement from playing, Teather graduated from the University of Salford with a physiotherapy degree and now works as physiotherapist. He started his new career with the Sheffield United first team, and now works for the Sheffield Steelers.
