= Matt Holland =

English footballer (born 1974)

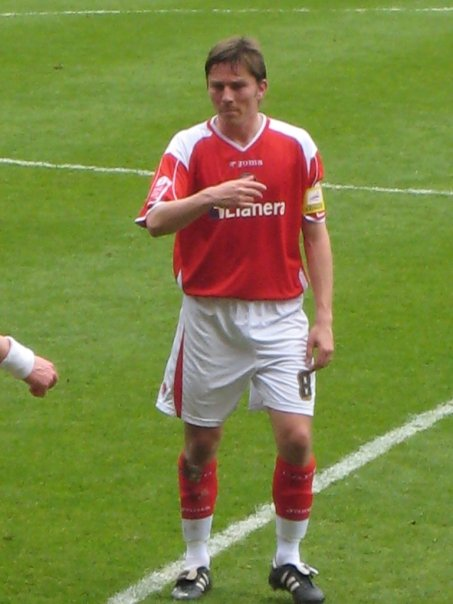
- Holland playing for Charlton Athletic in 2008

Personal information
- Full name: Matthew Rhys Holland
- Date of birth: 11 April 1974 (age 52)
- Place of birth: Bury, England
- Height: 1.75 m (5 ft 9 in)
- Position: Midfielder

Youth career
- Arsenal
- –1992: West Ham United

Senior career*
Years	Team	Apps	(Gls)
1992–1995	West Ham United	0	(0)
1992–1993	→ Farnborough Town (loan)	21	(0)
1994–1995	→ AFC Bournemouth (loan)	16	(1)
1995–1997	AFC Bournemouth	88	(17)
1997–2003	Ipswich Town	259	(38)
2003–2009	Charlton Athletic	191	(13)
Total		575	(69)

International career
1999	Republic of Ireland B	1	(0)
1999–2005	Republic of Ireland	49	(5)
- * Club domestic league appearances and goals

Matthew Rhys Holland (born 11 April 1974) is a former professional footballer who played as a midfielder. He is a director and club ambassador at Premier League club Ipswich Town.

Holland began his career at West Ham United, having previously been with Arsenal's academy. During his time at West Ham spent time out on loan at Farnborough Town and AFC Bournemouth, going on to join the later permanently in 1995. After making over one hundred appearances for Bournemouth and captaining the club, Holland signed for Ipswich Town in 1997. He spent six years at Ipswich, making over three hundred appearances and captaining the club to promotion to the Premier League through the First Division play-offs in 2000. In 2003, Holland signed for Charlton Athletic. He spent six years at Charlton, captaining the club and making over two hundred appearances. He retired from playing in 2009.

Having won one cap for the Republic of Ireland B team in 1999, he made his senior debut for the Republic of Ireland in October 1999. He represented the Republic of Ireland from 1999 to 2005 at international level, earning 49 caps and scoring 5 goals. He was included in their squad for the 2002 FIFA World Cup.

Since ending his football career he has worked in the media, including with the BBC, Setanta Sports, Talksport, BT Sport and RTÉ.

== Club career ==
=== Early career ===
Initially rejected by Arsenal for being 'too small', Holland went to West Ham United where he moved up the ranks of the academy but did not play for the first team. He joined Football Conference side Farnborough Town during the 1992–93 season and made twenty-one appearances.

=== AFC Bournemouth ===
In order to gain first team football, Holland joined South Coast side AFC Bournemouth in January 1995. He won the club's Player of the Year award for the 1995–96 season. He played a total of 104 games, scoring 18 goals whilst at Dean Court and also became captain.

=== Ipswich Town ===
In the summer of 1997, Holland joined Ipswich Town for a fee of £800,000. He made his debut for Ipswich on the opening day of the 1997–98 season, starting in a 0–0 draw with Queens Park Rangers. He scored his first goal for the club on 20 September 1997, netting in a 3–2 loss to Stoke City. Holland became an integral part of the side during his first season at Portman Road, starting every league and cup game as Ipswich finished 5th in the First Division, qualifying for the First Division play-offs as a result. Ipswich lost out 2–0 on aggregate over two legs to Charlton Athletic in the play-offs semi-finals. In total Holland made 59 appearances in all competitions during his first season at the club, scoring 12 goals, including a brace in a 3–0 away win over Torquay United in a League Cup second round tie. He won the club's Player of the Year award for the 1997–98 season.

He again became Ipswich's club captain during his second season at the club and continued to feature as a key part of the team. He scored his first goal of the season on 11 August in a 1–1 draw with Exeter City in a League Cup match. He once again featured in every game of season as Ipswich finished 3rd in the league and qualified for the play-offs for a third successive season. Ipswich were knocked out of the play-offs by Bolton Wanderers over two legs, losing the first leg 1–0, Holland scored a brace in the second leg in a 4–3 victory, one of which being the winning goal, leveling the tie at 4–4 with Ipswich losing out on away goals.

Ipswich continued to challenge for promotion during the 1999–2000 season. Holland kept up his impressive record of playing every game over the course of the season. He scored 10 goals in the league as Ipswich once again finished 3rd in the First Division, narrowly missing out on an automatic promotion place on the final day of the season. This meant Ipswich had qualified for the play-offs for the fourth season in a row. Holland started both legs of the semi-finals. The first leg of the semi-finals saw Ipswich come from 2–0 down to draw 2–2 away at Bolton, with Marcus Stewart scoring a brace. Ipswich won the second leg 5–3 at Portman Road, in a match that also saw two Bolton Wanderers players red carded, with goals from Jamie Clapham, Martijn Reuser and a Jim Magilton Hat-trick. Ipswich progressed to the play-offs final following a 7–5 aggregate win over Bolton Wanderers. Holland started in and captained Ipswich in the final on 29 May 2000 against Barnsley at Wembley Stadium. Ipswich again came from behind to eventually win the final 4–2, following goals from Tony Mowbray, Richard Naylor, Marcus Stewart and Martijn Reuser, winning promotion to the Premier League following a 5-year absence from the top flight.

The following season, Holland captained the club to a 5th-placed finish in the 2000–01 Premier League season, Ipswich's highest Premier League finish. He scored his first Premier League goal on 11 November in a 2–0 home win over Charlton Athletic at Portman Road. He also scored in League Cup wins over Millwall and Manchester City as Ipswich reached the semi-finals of the 2000–01 League Cup, losing 4–2 on aggregate to Birmingham City over two legs having won the first leg 1–0. Holland again started every league game that season, making 47 appearances in all competitions and scoring 5 goals. As a result of finishing 5th in the Premier League, Ipswich qualified for the UEFA Cup for the first time since the 1982–83 season.

Holland scored his first goal of the 2001–02 season on 28 October in a 3–2 loss to his former club West Ham United. He played every match in the Premier League and UEFA Cup that season, however Ipswich suffered relegation from the Premier League after finishing 18th in the 2001–02 season. In total Holland made 46 appearances during the season, scoring 3 goals, including the winning goal in a 2–1 away win over Everton on 2 February.

Though Ipswich were relegated Holland stayed with the club during the 2002–03 season after he turned down a £4 million move to Aston Villa. He continued to play regularly, scoring his first goals of the season on 18 August, netting a brace in a 6–1 win over Leicester City at Portman Road. On 15 March he scored the winning goal in a 1–0 win over Sheffield Wednesday. He made 54 appearances over the course of the season, scoring 7 goals as Ipswich finished 7th in the league. Holland won Ipswich's Player of the Year award for the second time in the 2002–03 season. His spell at Ipswich is remembered for the consistency he showed, after playing 223 consecutive games and only missing one league match (due to international duty) in the six years he was at Portman Road. Combined with the end of his time at Bournemouth, Holland's sequence of 286 matches is among the highest in English league football.

=== Charlton Athletic ===
After Ipswich failed to win promotion in 2003, Holland moved back to the Premier League by joining Charlton Athletic on a four-year contract for an initial £750,000 fee, which later rose to £900,000. Again with this move he assumed the captain's armband and was ever-present in his first season for the club. He made his debut for Charlton against Manchester City on 17 August 2003. He scored his first goals for the club on 3 November 2003 when he netted a brace in a 2–1 win over Birmingham City. He played in every league game during his first season at Charlton, scoring 6 goals. In his first season at the club, Holland captained Charlton to 7th in the league, their highest ever Premier League finish.

Holland continued to be a key part of the Charlton side during the 2004–05 season. He scored the winning goal in 1–0 away win over West Bromwich Albion on 11 December, a month later he again scored the winner in a 1–0 away win over Everton. He scored 3 goals in 36 appearances as Charlton finished 11th in the Premier League.

He remained as a regular in the Charlton first-team during the following season, helping the club to another mid-table season in the top-flight in the 2005–06 season, although Charlton did suffer relegation from the Premier League the following season. Holland remained with the club following relegation, becoming one of the longest-serving Charlton players. He claimed more than half the entire vote for the 2007–08 Fans' Player of the Year award. He continued to play regularly during the 2008–09 season, making 38 appearances across all competitions. His final match came in a 2–2 draw with Cardiff City on 21 April 2009, and the club released him after relegation to League One at the end of the season.

In July 2009, Holland trained with Colchester United following his release from Charlton in order to keep himself fit.

== International career ==
Although born in England, Holland qualified to play for the Republic of Ireland through his grandmother who hailed from County Monaghan. He made his international debut on 9 October 1999 in an away Euro 2000 qualifier against Macedonia, playing the last five minutes as a substitute for Mark Kennedy. He made his club manager at the time, George Burley, aware of his interest and Burley spoke to the national manager Mick McCarthy. Holland's first goal for the national team came on his fifth cap, the equaliser in a 1–1 draw with Portugal on 7 October 2000 in qualification for the 2002 FIFA World Cup. Holland captained the side in three internationals, the first on his 28th cap, a 2–0 friendly defeat to Scotland.

He went with the Republic of Ireland to the 2002 World Cup scoring the equaliser against Cameroon in their opening game. He swapped shirts with Dietmar Hamann after the Germany game. Ireland were eliminated from this tournament in a Second Round penalty shoot-out against Spain, with Holland among those who missed. Following Ireland's failure to qualify for the 2006 World Cup, he announced his retirement from international football on 5 February 2006 having made 49 appearances and scoring five goals. Manager Steve Staunton had attempted to persuade Holland to continue.

== Media career ==
He was one of several players and managers (including Danny Mills and Paul Jewell) who acted as summarisers for BBC Radio 5 Live during the 2006 World Cup. Holland has also appeared on the BBC television program A Question of Sport and the radio quiz Fighting Talk. Holland as a freelance pundit has appeared on nearly every media outlet covering football in the UK. He has been a pundit on ESPN & Sky Sports, appeared on BBC results service Final Score on the odd Saturday afternoon and appeared on ITV commentating on the UEFA Cup. He is also a presenter for the Eastern England edition of the BBC regional football show Late Kick Off.

He has also appeared on many radio shows, he usually appears on Talksport on kick off usually on Friday nights and also appearing on Matchday Live on Saturday afternoons whenever he is not on Final Score. Holland has also appeared frequently on Absolute Radio and BBC Radio 5 Live as a co-commentator as well as Final Score, Premier Soccer Saturday or Talksport. In addition Holland previously appeared as an analyst for Setanta Sports' live matches.

He also co-commentates on BT Sport on the UEFA Champions League and UEFA Europa League.

Holland began work with RTÉ when he commentated alongside George Hamilton during the Rep. of Ireland and Brazil friendly. He then appeared as a member of the panel on RTÉ's Premier Soccer Saturday for a number of weeks. He commentated the 2010 FIFA World Cup.

== Personal life ==
Holland is colour blind. He said that he had particular difficulty on his Charlton debut, when they wore red against Plymouth Argyle's green.

== Career statistics ==
=== Club ===
Appearances and goals by club, season and competition
Club	Season	League			FA Cup		League Cup		Other		Total	
Club	Season	Division	Apps	Goals	Apps	Goals	Apps	Goals	Apps	Goals	Apps	Goals
West Ham United	1992–93	First Division	0	0	0	0	0	0	—		0	0
West Ham United	1993–94	Premier League	0	0	0	0	0	0	—		0	0
West Ham United	1994–95	Premier League	0	0	0	0	0	0	—		0	0
West Ham United	Total		0	0	0	0	0	0	0	0	0	0
Farnborough Town (loan)	1992–93	Football Conference	21	0	0	0	—		—		21	0
AFC Bournemouth (loan)	1994–95	Second Division	16	1	0	0	0	0	0	0	16	1
AFC Bournemouth	1995–96	Second Division	43	10	2	0	4	0	3 (Note: Appearances in Football League Trophy)	0	52	10
AFC Bournemouth	1996–97	Second Division	45	7	1	0	2	0	0	0	48	7
AFC Bournemouth	Total		104	18	3	0	6	0	3	0	116	18
Ipswich Town	1997–98	First Division	46	10	4	0	7	2	2 (Note: Appearances in First Division play-offs)	0	59	12
Ipswich Town	1998–99	First Division	46	5	2	0	4	2	2	2	54	9
Ipswich Town	1999–2000	First Division	46	10	1	0	4	0	3	0	54	10
Ipswich Town	2000–01	Premier League	38	3	2	0	7	2	—		47	5
Ipswich Town	2001–02	Premier League	38	3	1	0	1	0	6 (Note: Appearances in UEFA Cup)	0	46	3
Ipswich Town	2002–03	First Division	45	7	2	0	1	0	6	0	54	7
Ipswich Town	Total		259	38	12	0	24	6	19	2	314	46
Charlton Athletic	2003–04	Premier League	38	6	1	0	2	0	—		41	6
Charlton Athletic	2004–05	Premier League	32	3	3	0	1	0	—		36	3
Charlton Athletic	2005–06	Premier League	23	1	5	1	2	0	—		30	2
Charlton Athletic	2006–07	Premier League	33	1	1	0	2	0	—		36	1
Charlton Athletic	2007–08	Championship	31	1	2	0	1	0	—		34	1
Charlton Athletic	2008–09	Championship	34	1	3	0	1	0	—		38	1
Charlton Athletic	Total		191	13	15	1	9	0	0	0	215	14
Career total			575	69	30	1	39	6	22	2	666	78

=== International ===
Appearances and goals by national team and year
National team	Year	Apps	Goals
Republic of Ireland	1999	1	0
Republic of Ireland	2000	5	1
Republic of Ireland	2001	9	2
Republic of Ireland	2002	12	1
Republic of Ireland	2003	10	0
Republic of Ireland	2004	6	1
Republic of Ireland	2005	6	0
Total		49	5

Scores and results list Republic of Ireland's goal tally first, score column indicates score after each Holland goal.

List of international goals scored by Matt Holland
No.	Date	Venue	Cap	Opponent	Score	Result	Competition
1	7 October 2000	Estádio da Luz, Lisbon, Portugal	6	Portugal	1–1	1–1	2002 FIFA World Cup qualification
2	28 March 2001	Mini Estadi, Barcelona, Spain	8	Andorra	3–0	3–0	2002 FIFA World Cup qualification
3	6 June 2001	A. Le Coq Arena, Tallinn, Estonia	11	Estonia	2–0	2–0	2002 FIFA World Cup qualification
4	1 June 2002	Niigata Stadium, Niigata, Japan	20	Cameroon	1–1	1–1	2002 FIFA World Cup
5	27 May 2004	Lansdowne Road, Dublin, Republic of Ireland	40	Romania	1–0	1–0	Friendly

== Honours ==
Ipswich Town

- Football League First Division play-offs: 2000

Individual

- AFC Bournemouth Player of the Year: 1995–96
- Ipswich Town Player of the Year: 1997–98, 2002–03
- Charlton Athletic Player of the Year: 2007–08
- Ipswich Town Hall of Fame: Inducted 2014

== See also ==
- List of Republic of Ireland international footballers born outside the Republic of Ireland
