= Chris Leadbitter =

English footballer (born 1967)

Personal information
- Full name: Christopher Jonathan Leadbitter
- Date of birth: 17 October 1967 (age 59)
- Place of birth: Middlesbrough, England
- Height: 5 ft 9 in (1.75 m)
- Position: Midfielder

Youth career
- Grimsby Town

Senior career*
| Years | Team | Apps | (Gls) |
| 1985–1986 | Grimsby Town | 0 | (0) |
| 1986–1988 | Hereford United | 36 | (1) |
| 1988–1993 | Cambridge United | 176 | (18) |
| 1989 | → Barnet (loan) | 12 | (0) |
| 1993–1995 | AFC Bournemouth | 54 | (3) |
| 1995–1997 | Plymouth Argyle | 52 | (1) |
| 1997 | Dorchester Town | | |
| 1997–1999 | Torquay United | 63 | (2) |
| 1999–2001 | Plymouth Argyle | 40 | (2) |
| 2001–2002 | Guisborough Town | | |
| 2002–200? | Whitby Town | | |
| 2003–200? | Peterlee Newtown | | |
| 200?–2005 | Thornaby | | |
| 2005 | Bishop Auckland | 2 | (0) |
| 2005–200? | Guisborough Town | | |
- * Club domestic league appearances and goals

Christopher Jonathan Leadbitter (born 17 October 1967) is an English former footballer who made more than 400 appearances in the Football League playing as a midfielder for Hereford United, Cambridge United, AFC Bournemouth, Plymouth Argyle and Torquay United.

== Career ==
Leadbitter was born in Middlesbrough and began his career as an apprentice at Grimsby Town. He failed to make the breakthrough and moved to Hereford United in 1985 to make his league debut. He played 36 league games for them over two seasons, then signed for Cambridge United before the 1987–88 season. After a brief loan spell at Conference club Barnet, Leadbitter became a regular part of the Cambridge side under manager John Beck and helped the club gain consecutive promotions and reach the quarter-finals of the FA Cup in successive seasons.

After 176 league appearances and 18 goals, he moved onto AFC Bournemouth for £25,000 in 1993 and then Plymouth Argyle in 1995. He played 63 games in all competitions for Plymouth, spent time out of the Football League at Dorchester Town, returned to it for two seasons with Torquay United, went back to Argyle to make a further 51 appearances, then retired from professional football in 2001.

He returned to the north-east of England and played non-League football for Guisborough Town, Whitby Town, Peterlee Newtown, Thornaby, Bishop Auckland, and Guisborough again.

== Honours ==
Cambridge United

- Football League Third Division: 1990–91
- Football League Fourth Division play-offs: 1990

Plymouth Argyle

- Football League Third Division play-offs: 1996
