= Steve Jones (footballer, born March 1970) =

English footballer

Personal information
- Full name: Steven Gary Jones
- Date of birth: 17 March 1970 (age 56)
- Place of birth: Cambridge, England
- Position: Striker

Senior career*
Years	Team	Apps	(Gls)
- Basildon United
1991–1992	Billericay Town		
1992–1994	West Ham United	16	(4)
1994–1996	AFC Bournemouth	74	(25)
1996–1997	West Ham United	8	(0)
1997–1999	Charlton Athletic	53	(8)
1997–1998	→ AFC Bournemouth (loan)	5	(4)
1999–2002	Bristol City	37	(7)
2000	→ Brentford (loan)	8	(0)
2000	→ Southend United (loan)	9	(2)
2000	→ Wycombe Wanderers (loan)	5	(0)
2002	Hornchurch		
- * Club domestic league appearances and goals

Steven Gary Jones (born 17 March 1970) is an English former professional footballer who played as a striker.

== Career ==
Jones started his footballing career at non-League clubs Basildon United and then Billericay Town. He had been working at a local soap factory and earning £250 per week before moving to West Ham who increased his wages to £400 per week.

He moved to West Ham United in November 1992 for £22,500 rising to £45,000 based on appearances, and made his first senior appearance for the East London club in a reserve fixture against Southampton on 17 November 1992. He made his first-team debut away to Cosenza Calcio 1914 in the Anglo-Italian Cup on 8 December 1992, and set up the only goal of the game for Clive Allen. His first goal for the club came against Barnsley in a 1–1 home draw on 6 February 1993, ten minutes into his full Football League First Division debut. Jones also scored against Peterborough three days later in a 2–1 home win for the Hammers.

Jones made just three Premier League starts and five appearances as a substitute during the 1993–94 campaign. He scored in a memorable 1–4 away win for West Ham against London rivals Tottenham Hotspur on Easter Monday 1994, after coming on as a substitute in the first half. In October 1994 he joined AFC Bournemouth.

In January 1996, after a successful spell at the south coast club, West Ham manager Harry Redknapp again brought the player back to Upton Park for a fee of £200,000, with Mark Watson moving to Dean Court. During his second spell with West Ham he was partnered with Mike Newell as twin strikers. With the pair both failing to score goals manager Redknapp bought Paul Kitson and John Hartson to provide the goals needed to keep West Ham from relegation and Jones was allowed to leave. He joined Charlton Athletic in February 1997 for £400,000. He played in their dramatic win over Sunderland in the 1998 play-off final, winning 7–6 on penalties after a 4–4 draw. He had been nominated as the eighth penalty taker, if required.

After another short spell at Bournemouth, Jones moved to Bristol City for fee of £425,000 and then had loan spells at Brentford, Southend United and Wycombe Wanderers. He became player-coach for Isthmian League team Hornchurch in June 2002. Jones was forced to retire from professional football due to injury.

== Personal life ==
Jones is the founder of Langdon Pumas, a youth football club in Basildon.

== Honours ==
Charlton Athletic

- Football League First Division play-offs: 1998
