= Mark Rawlinson =

English footballer and police officer

Personal information
- Date of birth: 9 June 1975 (age 51)
- Place of birth: Bolton, England
- Position: Midfielder

Youth career
- 1993–1995: Manchester United

Senior career*
Years	Team	Apps	(Gls)
1995–2000	Bournemouth	79	(2)
2000–2001	Exeter City	25	(2)
2001–2003	Weymouth		
2003–2004	Dorchester Town		
2005–2006	FC United of Manchester		
- * Club domestic league appearances and goals

Mark Rawlinson (born 9 June 1975) is an English footballer who played in The Football League for Bournemouth and Exeter City.

== Career ==
Rawlinson started his career at Manchester United before leaving in 1995 to join Bournemouth where he spent five years. He then joined Exeter City before dropping into non-league football with Weymouth, Dorchester Town and FC United of Manchester.
