= John Bailey (footballer, born 1969) =

English footballer

Personal information
- Date of birth: 6 May 1969 (age 57)
- Place of birth: London, England
- Position: Midfielder

Senior career*
Years	Team	Apps	(Gls)
1987–1989	Croydon	82 (1 sub)	(3)
1994–1995	Enfield		
1995–2000	AFC Bournemouth	137	(13)
- * Club domestic league appearances and goals

John Bailey (born 6 May 1969) is an English former footballer, most notable for being the only player to score for AFC Bournemouth at Wembley Stadium.

He started off in Croydon's youth side and, his potential evident, moved up to the first team, playing between 1987 and 1989. After playing for non-league Enfield from 1994 to 1995, he signed for Bournemouth in July 1995 for £10,000.

He scored Bournemouth's goal in the 1998 Auto Windscreens Shield final, which Grimsby Town won 2–1. However, he was injured towards the end of the 1998/99 season, and only appeared twice as a substitute in the 1999/2000 season. After attempting a comeback in the 2000/01 pre-season, he announced his retirement in October 2000.

He later played for Lymington Town F.C.

== Honours ==
Bournemouth

- Football League Trophy runner-up: 1997–98
