= Mark Watson (footballer, born 1973) =

English footballer

Personal information
- Full name: Mark Leon Watson
- Date of birth: 28 December 1973 (age 52)
- Place of birth: Birmingham, England
- Position: Striker

Senior career*
Years	Team	Apps	(Gls)
1994–1995	Sutton United		
1995–1996	West Ham United	1	(0)
1995	→ Leyton Orient (loan)	1	(1)
1995	→ Cambridge United (loan)	4	(1)
1996	→ Shrewsbury Town (loan)	1	(0)
1996–1997	AFC Bournemouth	15	(2)
1997–1998	Welling United	2	(2)
1998–2000	Sutton United	36	(11)
2000–2001	Woking	13	(1)
- Chesham United
2001–2002	Aldershot Town	31	(8)
- * Club domestic league appearances and goals

Mark Watson (born 28 December 1973) is an English former footballer who played as a forward.

Watson signed for West Ham United in 1995 for £50,000, following a 16-goal season for Sutton United in 1994–95. He travelled with the West Ham team on their 1995 Centenary Tour of Australia, playing in three of the four games and scoring on his debut. He spend almost the whole of the 1995–96 season playing for the reserve team, where he scored 15 goals in 24 Combination matches as well as 3 goals in 8 matches in the Capital League. He was loaned to Leyton Orient in September 1995, Cambridge United in October 1995, and Shrewsbury Town in February 1996. He didn't make his competitive debut for West Ham until 27 April 1996, the penultimate game of the season, when he was a 77th-minute substitute against Queens Park Rangers. This proved to be his only appearance for West Ham before making a permanent switch to AFC Bournemouth, on 17 May 1996, in a deal that saw Steve Jones move in the opposite direction.
