= Ian Cox =

Trinidad and Tobago footballer (born 1971)

Ian Cox CM
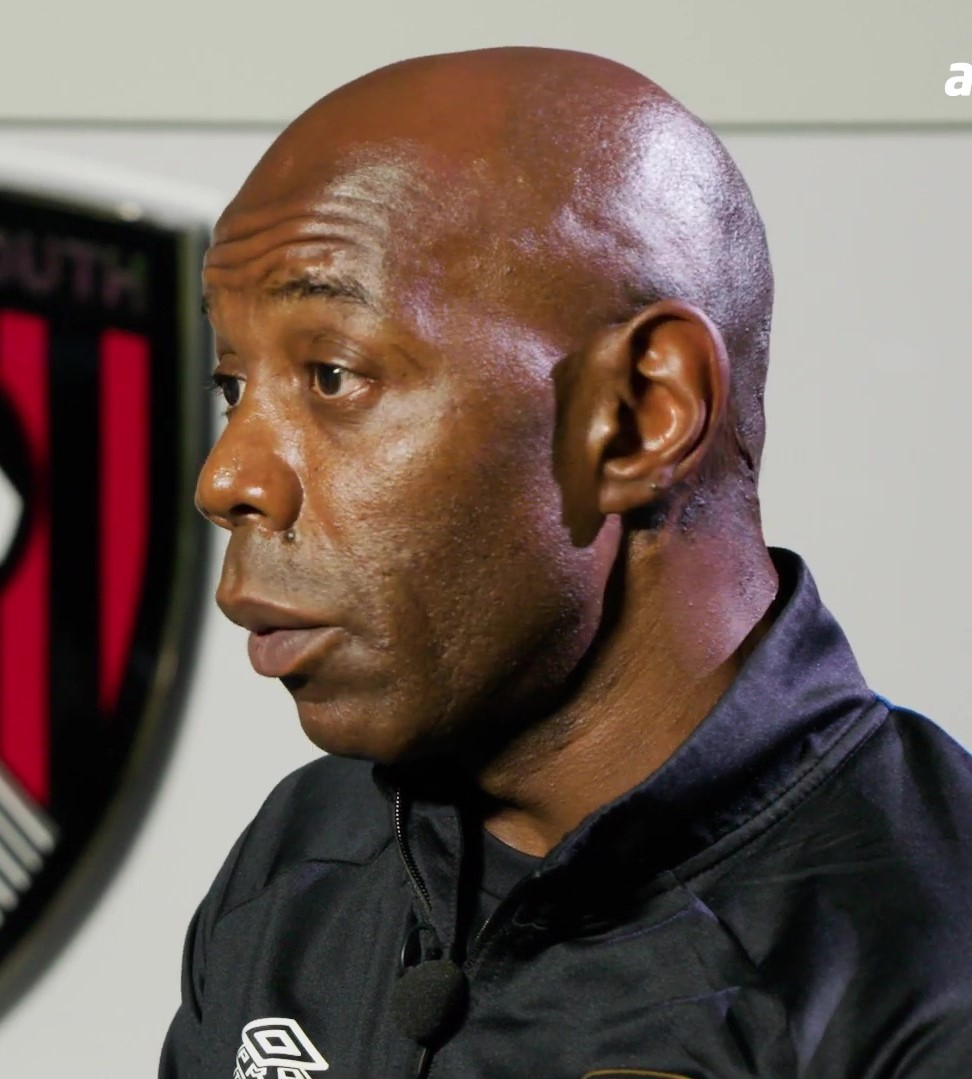
- Cox in an interview with AFC Bournemouth in 2021

Personal information
- Full name: Ian Gary Cox
- Date of birth: 25 March 1971 (age 55)
- Place of birth: Croydon, London, England
- Height: 1.83 m (6 ft 0 in)
- Position: Central defender

Youth career
- 1993–1994: Carshalton Athletic

Senior career*
| Years | Team | Apps | (Gls) |
| 1994–1996 | Crystal Palace | 15 | (0) |
| 1996–2000 | AFC Bournemouth | 173 | (16) |
| 2000–2003 | Burnley | 115 | (5) |
| 2003–2008 | Gillingham | 153 | (6) |
| 2008–2009 | Maidstone United | 21 | (2) |
| 2013–2015 | Whitstable Town | ? | (?) |
| Total | | 477 | (29) |

International career
| 2000–2006 | Trinidad and Tobago | 16 | (0) |

Managerial career
- 2015–2016: Whitstable Town (joint)
- * Club domestic league appearances and goals

Ian Gary Cox CM (born 25 March 1971) is a former professional footballer. Cox was most recently joint manager at Whitstable Town, a post he took up in November 2015. Born in England, he represented the Trinidad and Tobago national team internationally, notably appearing at the 2006 FIFA World Cup.

== Club career ==
Born in Croydon, England, Cox joined Crystal Palace from non-League side Carshalton Athletic for a fee of £40,000 in 1994. Opportunities were limited and he eventually joined AFC Bournemouth on a free transfer in 1996 having made just a handful of appearances for Crystal Palace. At Palace he scored his first professional goal in an FA Cup defeat to Port Vale in January 1996.

He enjoyed a hugely successful spell at Bournemouth where he played alongside Rio Ferdinand, his no-nonsense playing style endeared himself to the fans in a playing spell that included over 170 league appearances. In February 2000 Cox joined Burnley for £500,000. He notched up over 100 appearances for the Championship side scoring five goals, before joining Gillingham on a free transfer, in the 2003–04 season.

Predominantly a central defender, Cox can also play in midfield.

On 28 March 2008, Cox was released by Gillingham and signed for Isthmian League Premier Division side and local rivals Maidstone United. Up until the turn of the year Cox was a permanent fixture in Maidstone's starting XI, playing a big part in what was one of the best defences in the league. However, in January 2009, Cox's work as a prison officer meant he could no longer commit himself to the club. He did not appear for the Stones in over four months, however he did return in April 2009 to make three more appearances before retiring from football at the end of the season. In August 2013, however, he came out of retirement to play for Whitstable Town, managed by former teammate Nicky Southall.

== International career ==
Cox was born in Croydon, England, but qualified for Trinidad and Tobago through his Tobago-born mother. He made his debut in a 0–1 loss to Morocco in January 2000, and was named in the Soca Warriors' 2000 CONCACAF Gold Cup squad shortly thereafter.

After frustration from his then Burnley manager Stan Ternent that his international duties were limiting his availability for club football, in April 2001 Cox chose to withdraw from the international side. However, after a consistent run of form for Gillingham, as well as a return to the helm of Bertille St Clair who had handed him his international debut, Cox came out of international retirement in 2004.

After appearing as a substitute in the crucial second-leg of Trinidad and Tobago's qualifying play-off against Bahrain, Cox was named in the Trinidad and Tobago squad for the 2006 FIFA World Cup. He was on the bench against Sweden, England and Paraguay in Trinidad and Tobago's first ever games in a World Cup, but did not feature. Cox retired from international football immediately after Trinidad's elimination from the tournament.

== Coaching career ==
In June 2015, Cox joined Isthmian League Division One South side Ramsgate as head coach, and in November of the same year moved to Whitstable Town as joint manager with Wayne Wilson. He left the club by mutual consent on 1 March 2016.

Cox has also worked as an Equality Officer and first-team coach at his former club Gillingham, and coordinator of the National Citizen Service programme at former club Bournemouth.

== Awards ==
As a member of the Trinidad and Tobago squad that competed at the 2006 FIFA World Cup in Germany, Cox was awarded the Chaconia Medal (Gold Class), the second highest state decoration of Trinidad and Tobago.

== Honours ==
Bournemouth

- Football League Trophy runner-up: 1997–98
