= Stephen Robinson (footballer) =

Northern Irish footballer (born 1974)

Personal information
- Full name: Stephen Robinson
- Date of birth: 10 December 1974 (age 51)
- Place of birth: Belfast, Northern Ireland
- Position: Midfielder

Youth career
- Lisburn Youth
- 1991–1993: Tottenham Hotspur

Senior career*
Years	Team	Apps	(Gls)
1993–1994	Tottenham Hotspur	2	(0)
1994	→ Leyton Orient (loan)	0	(0)
1994–2000	AFC Bournemouth	241	(52)
2000–2002	Preston North End	24	(1)
2002	→ Bristol City (loan)	6	(1)
2002–2008	Luton Town	185	(8)
Total		458	(62)

International career
1989	Northern Ireland U16	1	(0)
1991	Northern Ireland U18	2	(1)
1994	Northern Ireland U21	1	(0)
1994–1998	Northern Ireland B	4	(1)
1997–2007	Northern Ireland	7	(0)

Managerial career
- 2016–2017: Oldham Athletic
- 2017–2020: Motherwell
- 2021–2022: Morecambe
- 2022–2026: St Mirren
- 2026: Aberdeen
- * Club domestic league appearances and goals

Stephen Robinson (born 10 December 1974) is a Northern Irish football manager and former player who was most recently the head coach of Scottish Premiership club Aberdeen.

During his career, he played for Tottenham Hotspur, Leyton Orient, AFC Bournemouth, Preston North End, Bristol City, Luton Town and internationally for Northern Ireland.

Robinson has managed Oldham Athletic, Motherwell, Morecambe and St Mirren before being appointed Aberdeen manager in March 2026. He was dismissed by Aberdeen in November 2026.

== Early life ==
Robinson was born in Lisburn, Northern Ireland. He played for Lisburn Youth as a child and started out as a forward.

== Club career ==
Robinson began his career with the Tottenham Hotspur youth system as a trainee, signing a professional contract in January 1994. He joined AFC Bournemouth due to the lack of first team opportunities at Tottenham. After a highly successful time at Bournemouth, Robinson joined Preston North End in 2000. After failing to force himself into Preston's starting XI, he joined Bristol City on loan until the end of the 2001–02 season.

After this he joined Luton Town for a fee of £50,000 in 2002. He was forced to play on the right-wing by then manager Joe Kinnear, despite his position being an attacking centre-midfielder in his Bournemouth days. New manager Mike Newell soon reverted Robinson to his favoured central-midfield role, and he was rewarded with a League One championship in 2005, and a tenth-place finish in the Championship in 2006. During the 2006–07 season, Robinson captained the side in Chris Coyne's absence and was handed a new two-year contract by Hatters boss Mike Newell. On 26 July 2008 Robinson agreed to a mutual termination of his contract at Luton.

== International career ==
Robinson was capped internationally by Northern Ireland on seven occasions from 1997 to 2007. He also played for the under-16 (one cap), under-18 (two caps, one goal), under-21 (one cap) and B (four caps, one goal) teams.

== Coaching career ==
=== Motherwell assistant ===
Robinson joined Motherwell in February 2015, to assist manager Ian Baraclough. He also assisted the Northern Ireland national team, working with Michael O'Neill, that qualified for UEFA Euro 2016. Robinson was previously manager of the under-age Northern Ireland squads, working for the Irish Football Association.

=== Oldham Athletic ===
Robinson was appointed manager of Oldham Athletic in July 2016. He was replaced as manager by John Sheridan on 12 January 2017.

=== Return to Motherwell ===
Robinson returned to Motherwell in February 2017, this time to assist Mark McGhee as first team coach. Less than two weeks later, Robinson took over as interim manager following McGhee's departure from the club. He was subsequently appointed as manager on a permanent basis in March 2017. On 13 October 2017, Manager Robinson extended his contract with Motherwell until May 2020.

On 22 October 2017, Robinson guided Motherwell to the Scottish League Cup final after defeating Pedro Caixinha's Rangers 2–0 at Hampden. The game saw both managers sent to the stands for their behaviour on the touchline. They were defeated in the final 2–0 by Celtic. In April 2018, Motherwell won in the 2017–18 Scottish Cup semi-finals, overcoming Aberdeen 3–0, to set up another final with Celtic the following month; this was the first time the club had appeared in both domestic finals since the 1950–51 season.

On 27 September 2019, Robinson said clubs had a duty of care in relation to players' mental well-being if they were injured.

On 31 December 2020, Robinson resigned as Motherwell manager, after over three years in charge of the Lanarkshire side.

=== Morecambe ===
On 7 June 2021, Robinson was named as manager of newly promoted League One side Morecambe on a three-year deal.

=== St Mirren ===
Robinson returned to Scottish football in February 2022, becoming manager of St Mirren. In December 2025, Robinson and St Mirren lifted the Scottish League Cup defeating Celtic 3-1 at Hampden Park. Robinson left St Mirren in March 2026 to take up the vacant position at Aberdeen.

=== Aberdeen ===
Robinson was appointed as head coach at Aberdeen in March 2026, after Aberdeen met a compensation clause in his contract with St Mirren. He was sacked by Aberdeen after 8 months in the job.

== Personal life ==
His son Harry is also a footballer.

Robinson was accused of assaulting and behaving in a threatening or abusive manner towards his partner, Robyn Lauchlan, on Waverley Bridge in Edinburgh on 13 December 2019. He was found not guilty after a trial at Edinburgh Sheriff Court in February 2020.

== Career statistics ==
=== Club ===
Appearances and goals by club, season and competition
Club	Season	League			FA Cup		League Cup		Other		Total	
Club	Season	Division	Apps	Goals	Apps	Goals	Apps	Goals	Apps	Goals	Apps	Goals
Tottenham Hotspur	1993–94	Premier League	2	0	0	0	0	0	0	0	2	0
AFC Bournemouth	1996–97	Second Division	40	7	1	0	1	0	0	0	42	7
AFC Bournemouth	1997–98	Second Division	46	11	3	2	2	0	5	0	56	13
AFC Bournemouth	1998–98	Second Division	42	13	4	1	4	1	3	1	53	16
AFC Bournemouth	1999–2000	Second Division	40	9	3	1	4	0	2	0	49	10
AFC Bournemouth	Total		168	40	11	4	11	1	10	1	200	46
Preston North End	2000–01	First Division	22	1	0	0	3	0	0	0	25	1
Preston North End	2001–02	First Division	2	0	1	0	1	0	0	0	4	0
Preston North End	Total		24	1	1	0	4	0	0	0	29	0
Bristol City	2001–02	Second Division	6	1	0	0	0	0	0	0	6	1
Luton Town	2002–03	Second Division	29	1	2	0	2	0	1	0	34	1
Luton Town	2003–04	Second Division	34	2	4	1	0	0	2	0	40	3
Luton Town	2004–05	League One	31	4	2	0	1	0	0	0	34	4
Luton Town	2005–06	Championship	26	3	1	0	0	0	0	0	27	3
Luton Town	2006–07	Championship	38	0	3	0	1	0	0	0	42	0
Luton Town	2007–08	League One	27	1	3	0	3	0	1	0	34	1
Luton Town	Total		185	11	15	1	5	0	4	0	211	12
Overall			385	53	27	5	20	1	14	1	448	59

=== International ===
Appearances and goals by national team and year
National team	Year	Apps	Goals
Northern Ireland	1997	1	0
Northern Ireland	1998	0	0
Northern Ireland	1999	0	0
Northern Ireland	2000	1	0
Northern Ireland	2001	2	0
Northern Ireland	2002	0	0
Northern Ireland	2003	0	0
Northern Ireland	2004	1	0
Northern Ireland	2005	1	0
Northern Ireland	2006	0	0
Northern Ireland	2007	1	0
Total		7	0

== Managerial record ==
As of match played 7 November 2026

Managerial record by team and tenure
Team	From	To	Record				
Team	From	To	G	W	D	L	Win %
Oldham Athletic	9 July 2016	12 January 2017	33	7	11	15	21.2
Motherwell	28 February 2017	31 December 2020	169	71	30	68	42.0
Morecambe	7 June 2021	22 February 2022	40	10	10	20	25.0
St Mirren	22 February 2022	12 March 2026	188	63	45	80	33.5
Aberdeen	12 March 2026	9 November 2026	28	11	5	12	39.3
Total			457	162	101	194	35.4

== Honours ==
=== As a player ===
Bournemouth

- Football League Trophy runner-up: 1997–98

Luton Town

- Football League One: 2004–05

Individual

- PFA Team of the Year: 1998–99 Second Division

=== As a manager ===
Motherwell

- Scottish Cup runner-up: 2017–18
- Scottish League Cup runner-up: 2017–18

St Mirren

- Scottish League Cup: 2025–26

Individual

- Scottish Premiership Manager of the Month: February 2019, August 2023
