= Mark Morris (footballer, born 1962) =

English footballer

Personal information
- Full name: Mark John Morris
- Date of birth: 26 September 1962 (age 64)
- Place of birth: Carshalton, England
- Height: 6 ft 0 in (1.83 m)
- Position: Defender

Youth career
- Wimbledon

Senior career*
Years	Team	Apps	(Gls)
1980–1987	Wimbledon	168	(9)
1985	→ Aldershot (loan)	14	(0)
1987–1989	Watford	41	(1)
1989–1991	Sheffield United	56	(3)
1991–1996	AFC Bournemouth	194	(8)
1996	→ Gillingham (loan)	6	(0)
1996–1997	Brighton & Hove Albion	31	(2)
1997	Hastings Town		
1997–2003	Dorchester Town		

Managerial career
- 1999–2006: Dorchester Town
- * Club domestic league appearances and goals

Mark John Morris (born 26 September 1962) is an English former professional footballer who played as a defender in the Football League for Wimbledon, where he was part of the so-called "Crazy Gang" , Aldershot, Watford, Sheffield United, AFC Bournemouth, Gillingham and Brighton & Hove Albion. A career with over 500 league appearances, playing and scoring in all four divisions having played at every league club during his professional playing days. He then moved into non-league football with Hastings Town, and then Dorchester Town, where he spent several years as a player, player-manager and manager winning the southern league and cup and charity shield and was arguably Dorchester towns most successful manager. New Milton Town.

== Honours ==
Wimbledon

- Football League Fourth Division: 1982–83
- Football League Group Cup runner-up: 1981–82
