= Scott Mean =

English footballer

Personal information
- Full name: Scott James Mean
- Date of birth: 13 December 1973 (age 52)
- Place of birth: Crawley, England
- Height: 6 ft 0 in (1.83 m)
- Position: Midfielder

Senior career*
Years	Team	Apps	(Gls)
1992–1996	Bournemouth	74	(8)
1996	→ West Ham United (loan)	0	(0)
1996	→ West Ham United (loan)	0	(0)
1996–1999	West Ham United	3	(0)
1998	→ Port Vale (loan)	1	(0)
1999–2000	Bournemouth	32	(4)
2000	Kingstonian	2	(0)
- Crawley Town
Total		112+	(12+)
- * Club domestic league appearances and goals

Scott James Mean (born 13 December 1973) is an English former footballer who played as a midfielder. After retiring from football, he turned his hand to acting.

== Playing career ==
Born in Crawley, Mean began his career with Bournemouth, playing 74 Second Division games under the stewardship of Tony Pulis and Mel Machin over the course of the 1992–93, 1993–94 and 1994–95 seasons. His form and potential earned him a £100,000 move to Premiership side West Ham United in November 1996. Highly rated at Upton Park, he was seen as having a promising career ahead of him at the top level. To aid in his development, he was loaned out to John Rudge's First Division Port Vale at the start of the 1998–99 season. However, 80 minutes into his Vale debut, he suffered a knee injury that virtually ended his career as a professional footballer. Quickly returning to Upton Park, he recovered to play again, but not to the same level as he once had seemed destined to.

In the summer of 1999, he returned to his previous club, Bournemouth, on a free transfer, back in the Second Division. He played regular football in the 1999–2000 season, scoring on his return to Dean Court on 7 August in a 2–1 win over Cambridge United. Despite playing 40 competitive games, he was released in May 2000. Not in demand the next season in the Football League, he dropped down to the Conference with Kingstonian. He played two games for the "K's" in October 2000, both were away defeats, both saw Mean receiving yellow cards. Before the month was out, he had joined Crawley Town in the Southern Football League. His professional days were long over; by May 2007, he was only competing in pub football.

== Style of play ==
Mean was described by BBC journalist Tom Fordyce as having "dashing good looks, very ordinary skills",

== Acting career ==
After his footballing career was cut short, Mean became an actor and appeared in two football-related productions. He played the England footballer "Parksey" alongside Ricky Tomlinson in the Mike Bassett: England Manager film before a stint in Sky1 series Dream Team, playing Robbie Walsh. He has also made appearances on various TV shows, most notably The Bill and EastEnders.

== Career statistics ==
Appearances and goals by club, season and competition
Club	Season	League			FA Cup		Other		Total	
Club	Season	Division	Apps	Goals	Apps	Goals	Apps	Goals	Apps	Goals
Bournemouth	1992–93	Second Division	15	1	0	0	4	0	19	1
Bournemouth	1993–94	Second Division	5	0	0	0	0	0	5	0
Bournemouth	1994–95	Second Division	40	6	2	0	5	0	47	6
Bournemouth	1995–96	Second Division	14	1	1	0	3	0	18	1
Bournemouth	Total		74	8	3	0	12	0	89	8
West Ham United	1996–97	Premier League	0	0	0	0	0	0	0	0
West Ham United	1997–98	Premier League	3	0	0	0	0	0	3	0
West Ham United	1998–99	Premier League	0	0	0	0	0	0	0	0
West Ham United	Total		3	0	0	0	0	0	3	0
Port Vale (loan)	1998–99	First Division	1	0	0	0	0	0	1	0
Bournemouth	1999–2000	Second Division	32	4	1	0	7	0	40	4
Career total			110	12	4	0	19	0	133	12
