= Jason Brissett =

English footballer (born 1974)

Personal information
- Full name: Jason Curtis Brissett
- Date of birth: 7 September 1974 (age 52)
- Place of birth: Redbridge, England
- Height: 5 ft 11 in (1.80 m)
- Position: Midfielder

Youth career
- Brimsdown Rovers
- Arsenal

Senior career*
Years	Team	Apps	(Gls)
1992–1993	Arsenal	0	(0)
1993–1994	Peterborough United	35	(0)
1994–1998	Bournemouth	125	(8)
1998–2000	Walsall	42	(2)
1999–2000	→ Cheltenham Town (loan)	8	(0)
2000–2001	Leyton Orient	4	(0)
2001	Stevenage Borough	2	(0)
Total		216	(10)
- * Club domestic league appearances and goals

Jason Curtis Brissett (born 7 September 1974) is an English former professional footballer who played as a midfielder.

== Career ==
After playing youth football with Brimsdown Rovers (alongside David Beckham) and Arsenal, Brissett played professionally with Peterborough United, Bournemouth, Walsall, Cheltenham Town, Leyton Orient and Stevenage Borough.

== Personal life ==
Brissett's son Jaden is also a footballer.
