= Russell Beardsmore =

English footballer

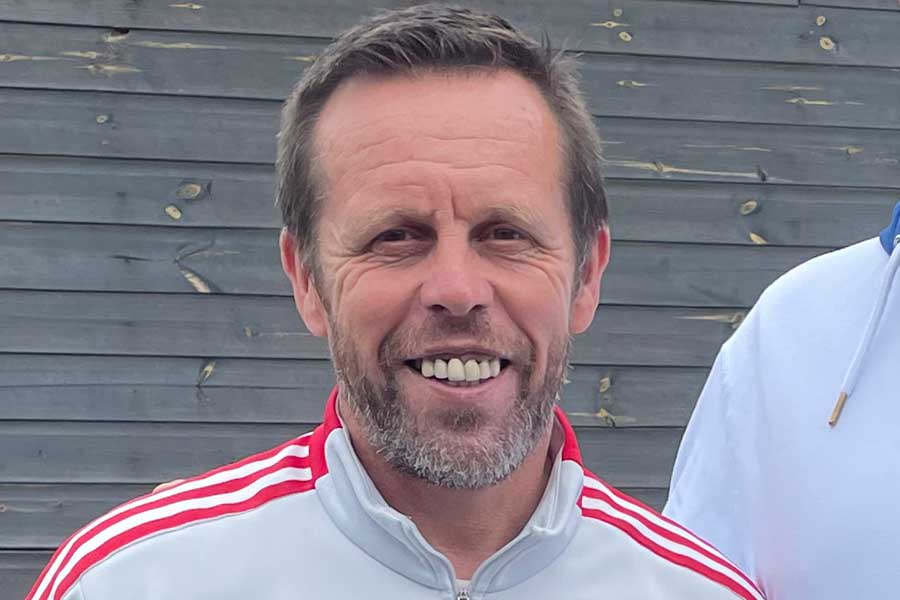
- Beardsmore in June 2022

Personal information
- Full name: Russell Peter Beardsmore
- Date of birth: 28 September 1968 (age 58)
- Place of birth: Wigan, England
- Height: 1.68 m (5 ft 6 in)
- Position: Midfielder

Youth career
- –1984: Atherton Collieries
- 1984–1986: Manchester United

Senior career*
Years	Team	Apps	(Gls)
1986–1993	Manchester United	56	(4)
1991	→ Blackburn Rovers (loan)	2	(0)
1993–1998	Bournemouth	198	(7)
Total		256	(11)

International career
1989	England U21	5	(0)
- * Club domestic league appearances and goals

Russell Peter Beardsmore (born 28 September 1968) is an English former footballer.

== Playing career ==
Beardsmore began his senior career with Manchester United, after playing for Atherton Collieries as a schoolboy. He made his debut in September 1988 against West Ham United and was one of the first wave of 'Fergie's Fledglings'. In only his second league start on New Year's Day 1989, he inspired Manchester United to a 3–1 home win over Liverpool at Old Trafford in the league, setting up goals for Brian McClair and Mark Hughes before scoring the third himself.

He became a regular in the team for the rest of the 1988–89 season, with former midfield regular Gordon Strachan being sold to Leeds United in March. Beardsmore played a total of 30 times for United in that campaign, scoring twice.

Beardsmore faced fresh competition for midfield places in the 1989–90 season following the arrivals of Neil Webb, Mike Phelan, Paul Ince and Danny Wallace, but still managed 25 appearances in all competitions (15 as a substitute) and scored twice, his chances of first team football being helped by long-term injuries in midfield to Neil Webb and Bryan Robson. However, both Webb and Robson had returned to full fitness by the end of the campaign, and Beardsmore missed out on a place in United's triumph in the FA Cup.

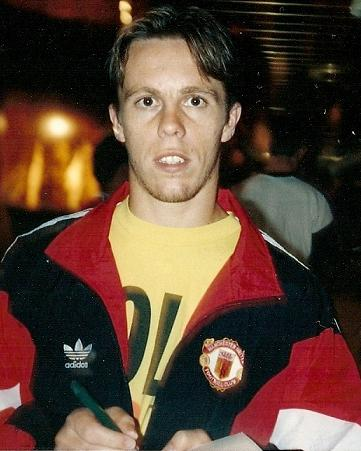
Beardsmore in 1991

He played 15 times in the 1990–91 season, and by the end of the season competition for places in midfield and on the wing had become fiercer still, with the signing of Andrei Kanchelskis and the breakthrough of Ryan Giggs. Beardsmore would play just three times for United in 1991–92 season.

He collected senior medals on 18 August 1990 as an unused substitute in the 1990 FA Charity Shield and on 19 November 1991, when he was selected as a non playing substitute in Manchester United's 1–0 European Super Cup win over Red Star Belgrade at Old Trafford. This was his last first team game for United. He had also previously been a member of United's victorious 1990–91 European Cup Winners' Cup campaign, although he did not make the squad for the Final. Beardsmore then played twice on loan in the Second Division for Blackburn Rovers.

He did not feature in a single competitive game when Manchester United won the first Premier League title in 1992–93 and at the end of the season signed for Bournemouth on a free transfer. He remained at Dean Court until his retirement from playing in 1998 after five years at the club, where he found regular first-team action, including captaining Bournemouth in the 1998 Football League Trophy final defeat to Grimsby Town at Wembley Stadium in a match that attracted the highest attendance in English football that day.

== Coaching ==
Beardsmore is currently employed at Manchester United Foundation as a BTEC coach, having previously been an Inclusion Officer AFC Bournemouth Community Sports Trust and the Assistant Community Officer at Bolton Wanderers during their early days in the Premier League.

== Honours ==
Manchester United

- FA Charity Shield: 1990
- European Cup Winners' Cup: 1990–91
- European Super Cup: 1991

Bournemouth

- Football League Trophy runner-up: 1997–98
