= David Town =

English footballer (born 1976)

Personal information
- Full name: David Town
- Date of birth: 9 December 1976 (age 49)
- Place of birth: Bournemouth, England
- Position: Striker

Team information
- Current team: Wimborne Town
- Number: 9

Youth career
- –1995: AFC Bournemouth

Senior career*
| Years | Team | Apps | (Gls) |
| 1995–1999 | AFC Bournemouth | 56 | (2) |
| 1997 | Dorchester Town | 2 | (0) |
| 1999–2001 | Rushden & Diamonds | 21 | (6) |
| 2001 | Hayes | 3 | (1) |
| 2001–2003 | Boston United | 39 | (7) |
| 2002 | Kettering Town | 6 | (1) |
| 2003–2005 | Havant & Waterlooville | 91 | (25) |
| 2005–2006 | Eastleigh | 33 | (12) |
| 2006– | Dorchester Town | 24 | (4) |
- Wimborne Town
- * Club domestic league appearances and goals

David Town (born 9 December 1976) is an English footballer. He currently plays for non league side Wimborne Town.

Town began his career as a trainee with his hometown side AFC Bournemouth, turning professional in April 1995. He spent September 1997 on loan to Dorchester Town. Despite not being a regular in the Bournemouth side, Rushden & Diamonds paid £30,000 to take him to Nene Park in May 1999. He joined Hayes on a two-month loan deal in late January 2001, moving to Boston United towards the end of March 2001.

He joined Kettering Town on loan in August 2002 and was released by Boston at the end of that season. In May 2003, he joined Havant & Waterlooville.

He moved to Eastleigh for the 2005–06 season, but left in September 2006 to join Dorchester Town.
