= Michael McElhatton (footballer) =

Irish footballer

Personal information
- Full name: Michael Terrence McElhatton
- Date of birth: 16 April 1975 (age 51)
- Place of birth: Killarney, County Kerry, Ireland
- Position: Midfielder

Youth career
- 1991–1993: AFC Bournemouth

Senior career*
Years	Team	Apps	(Gls)
1993–1996	AFC Bournemouth	42	(2)
1996–1998	Scarborough	70	(7)
1998–2002	Rushden & Diamonds	69	(16)
2002	→Chester City (loan)	8	(2)

International career
- Republic of Ireland Schoolboys
- * Club domestic league appearances and goals

Michael McElhatton (born 16 April 1975) is an Irish former footballer.

== Playing career ==
McElhatton began his career with AFC Bournemouth, progressing from the youth ranks to the first-team. After a spell with Scarborough from 1996 to 1998, he switched to Conference side Rushden & Diamonds, where he would play for four years. A serious knee injury during this period, limited his action after Rushden were promoted to The Football League in 2001.

In February 2002 McElhatton joined Chester City on loan, with his two-month stint with the club including two superbly taken goals in a 4–0 win at Stalybridge Celtic. He never made another senior appearance after helping Chester win 2–0 at Forest Green Rovers in April 2002, as his persistent knee problems led him to retire from football at the age of 27
