= Rob Murray (footballer) =

English footballer

Robert Murray
Personal information
- Date of birth: 31 October 1974 (age 51)
- Place of birth: Hammersmith
- Position: Defender

Senior career*
Years	Team	Apps	(Gls)
1998–1999	Richmond Kickers		
1999–2001	Dorchester Town		
- * Club domestic league appearances and goals

Robert Murray (born 31 October 1974) is an English former professional footballer. Murray, who was born in Hammersmith, played as a defender for A.F.C. Bournemouth.

He grow-up in Waterlooville, Hampshire.

Murray began his career at Bournemouth in 1992 straight from school as an apprentice. He spent 8 years with Bournemouth, recording 171 appearances and 14 goals. He holds the Bournemouth club record for youngest appearance in the first team on 15 September 1992 against Blackpool away. Murray was released by Bournemouth at the end of the 1997–98 season. He subsequently joined the Richmond Kickers, where he played 65 games and scored 25 goals. At the end of the 1999–2000 season, Murray signed for Dorchester Town on a 2-year contract.
