= 2008 Football League One play-off final =

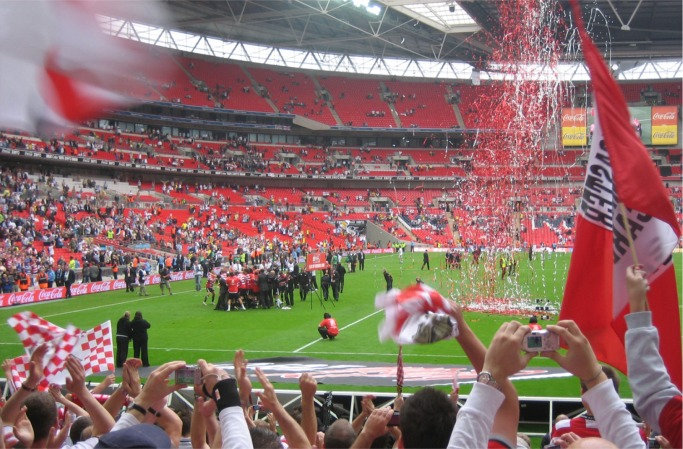
- Doncaster Rovers celebrate being promoted to the Championship at Wembley Stadium
Doncaster Rovers	Leeds United
1	0
- Date: 25 May 2008
- Venue: Wembley Stadium, London
- Referee: Andy D'Urso (Essex)
- Attendance: 75,132

The 2008 Football League One play-off final was an association football match which was played on 25 May 2008 at Wembley Stadium, London, between Doncaster Rovers and Leeds United to determine the third and final team to gain promotion from Football League One to the Football League Championship. The top two teams of the 2007–08 Football League One season, Swansea City and Nottingham Forest gained automatic promotion, although the latter only achieving second place due to Leeds United's deduction of 15 points for exiting administration. while those placed from third to sixth in the table took part in play-off semi-finals. The winners of these semi-finals competed for the final place for the 2008–09 season in the Championship. The losing semi-finalists were Carlisle United and Southend United.

The game was played in front of 75,132 spectators and was refereed by Andy D'Urso. After a goalless first half, Doncaster's James Hayter scored with a header from a Brian Stock corner. The match ended 1–0 to Doncaster, who were thus promoted to the Championship after four seasons in League One.

Leeds finished the following season in fourth place in League One and qualified for the play-offs, where they lost in the semi-finals to Millwall. Doncaster's next season ended with them in fourteenth position in the Championship.

== Route to the final ==
Football League One final table, leading positions
Pos	Team	Pld	W	D	L	GF	GA	GD	Pts
1	Swansea City	46	27	11	8	82	42	+40	92
2	Nottingham Forest	46	22	16	8	64	32	+32	82
3	Doncaster Rovers	46	23	11	12	65	41	+24	80
4	Carlisle United	46	23	11	12	64	46	+18	80
5	Leeds United	46	27	10	9	72	38	+34	76 (Note: Leeds deducted 15 points for failure to comply with rules on insolvency.)
6	Southend United	46	22	10	14	70	55	+15	76

Notes:

Doncaster Rovers finished the regular 2007–08 season in third place in Football League One, the third tier of the English football league system, two positions ahead of Leeds United. Both therefore missed out on the two automatic places for promotion to the Football League Championship and instead took part in the play-offs to determine the third promoted team. Doncaster Rovers finished two points behind Nottingham Forest (who were promoted in second place) and twelve behind league winners Swansea City. Leeds United ended the season four points behind Doncaster Rovers; before the start of the season, Leeds had been given a fifteen point deduction for "breaching rules on insolvency". Their manager, Dennis Wise, resigned in January 2008 and was replaced by Gary McAllister who confirmed that "the job brief is promotion."

Leeds United faced Carlisle United in their play-off semi-final with the first match of the two-legged tie being played at Elland Road in Leeds on 12 May 2008. The visitors took the lead on 32 minutes when a volley from Simon Hackney was deflected off Danny Graham into the Leeds net. Five minutes into the second half Marc Bridge-Wilkinson, the Carlisle midfielder, sidefooted in Evan Horwood's low cross to make it 2–0. Keiren Westwood, the Carlisle goalkeeper, made a number of saves in a performance which the BBC's Mandeep Sanghera called "heroic". However, he was beaten five minutes into stoppage time when Jermaine Beckford scored from a free kick to make the final score 2–1. The second leg of the play-off semi-final took place three days later at Brunton Park in Carlisle. Jonny Howson opened the scoring on 10 minutes for the away side to level the aggregate score at 2–2. Carlisle had a number of chances in the second half but could not convert any, and in the 90th minute, Howson scored his and Leeds' second from 18 yards (16 m): the game ended 2–0 to Leeds who progressed to the Wembley play-off final with a 3–2 aggregate victory.

In the other play-off semi-final, Doncaster Rovers faced Southend United and the first leg took place at Roots Hall in Southend-on-Sea on 9 May 2008. The home side dominated the first half but after the break, Doncaster's Jason Price missed several chances. Paul Heffernan was sent off for headbutting Southend's Peter Clarke after they tangled in a tackle with three minutes to go and the match finished goalless. The second leg was held a week later at the Keepmoat Stadium in Doncaster. The visitors hit the crossbar in the opening minutes through a James Walker strike but Doncaster took the lead on 11 minutes with a penalty from Brian Stock. Adam Barrett scored an own goal ten minutes later before James Coppinger struck a third to see the home side leading 3–0 at half-time. Coppinger completed his hat-trick with two more goals after the interval and with a consolation goal from Southend's Nicky Bailey made it 5–1 to Doncaster at the final whistle.

== Match ==
=== Background ===
Doncaster had played in the third tier of English football since gaining promotion from the Third Division as champions in the 2003–04 season. They had not featured in a league play-off final, although they won the 2003 Football Conference play-off final to secure their place back in the Football League. Doncaster had also never played a competitive match at Wembley Stadium. Leeds were relegated to League One the previous season, having also been deducted ten points for entering administration. The club had featured in two play-off finals prior to 2008: they lost the 1987 Football League Second Division play-off final to Charlton Athletic and were defeated by Watford in the 2006 Football League Championship play-off final. The last visit Leeds had paid to the national stadium was for the 1996 Football League Cup Final which they lost 3–0 against Aston Villa. During the regular season, both games between the sides resulted in away wins: Doncaster won 1–0 at Elland Road in January 2008 while Leeds secured a 1–0 victory at the Keepmoat Stadium the following April. Doncaster's top scorer going into the play-offs was Hayter with nine goals (seven in the league and two in the FA Cup). Beckford was leading scorer for Leeds with twenty goals, followed by Trésor Kandol with eleven.

The referee for the match was Andy D'Urso representing the Essex County Football Association. Both teams started the final with line-ups unchanged from their respective semi-final second leg matches. The BBC reported that Leeds had sold their full ticket allocation of 36,000 while Doncaster had sold 24,000. According to author Daniel Chapman, Leeds fans queued overnight for the chance to buy tickets, and that "by dawn there were 7,000 in a tired, hungry and angry scrum". Doncaster played in red-and-white hooped shirts while Leeds wore white kit.

=== Summary ===
The match kicked off around 3 p.m. on 25 May 2008 in front of 75,132 spectators. Within a minute, the Leeds defender Bradley Johnson's shot cleared the Doncaster crossbar. On six minutes, Price's shot from 6 yards (5.5 m) was blocked by Leeds before Richie Wellens struck the ball into the side netting. Casper Ankergren then made a save at Coppinger's feet before denying Hayter after Doncaster had beaten the offside trap. On 15 minutes, Matt Mills became the first player of the afternoon to be shown a yellow card for a foul on Beckford. In the 17th minute, Beckford's 20-yard (18 m) strike was saved in the Doncaster goal by Neil Sullivan. Ten minutes later, David Prutton was booked for a late tackle. Leeds increased the pressure and in the 31st minute Beckford's weak shot was saved by Sullivan. Five minutes before half time, Hayter's strike flew over the Leeds crossbar before Howson's curling shot passed narrowly outside the Doncaster post. The half was brought to a close with the score at 0–0.

Neither side made any changes to their personnel during the half-time interval, and Doncaster won an early free kick which Coppinger struck into the defensive wall. In the 48th minute, Hayter put Doncaster ahead: Stock played in an outswinging corner which Hayter scored with a diving header to make it 1–0. Three minutes later, Beckford's shot was saved by Sullivan low to his right. On 60 minutes, Howson's strike from 20 yards (18 m) was off-target. Twelve minutes later, Leeds made the first substitution of the game with Prutton being replaced by Kandol. Coppinger was then stopped by Jonathan Douglas before Mark McCammon came on for Wellens. With around twelve minutes remaining, Dougie Freedman's shot went wide and he was soon after replaced by Andrew Hughes. Two minutes later, Price was replaced by Adam Lockwood before Sullivan was booked for time-wasting. Doncaster then made their final substitution of the match with Coppinger being replaced by Lewis Guy. Douglas then saw his 20-yard (18 m) half-volley fly just wide of the Doncaster goal and after four minutes of stoppage time, the final whistle was blown.

=== Details ===
25 May 2008
15:00

Doncaster Rovers	1–0	Leeds United
Hayter 48'	(Report)

Wembley Stadium, London
Attendance: 75,132

Doncaster Rovers	Leeds United

GK	1	(Scotland) Neil Sullivan (yellow card) 84'
DF	2	(England) James O'Connor
DF	21	(England) Sam Hird
DF	22	(England) Matt Mills (yellow card) 15'
DF	3	(Wales) Gareth Roberts
MF	20	(England) Paul Green
MF	8	(Wales) Brian Stock
MF	19	(England) Richie Wellens	(substituted off) 71'
MF	26	(England) James Coppinger	(substituted off) 86'
FW	23	(Wales) Jason Price	(substituted off) 80'
FW	12	(England) James Hayter
Substitutes:
FW	9	(Barbados) Mark McCammon	(substituted on) 71'
GK	13	(England) Ben Smith
DF	11	(England) Adam Lockwood	(substituted on) 80'
FW	10	(Wales) Gareth Taylor
MF	7	(England) Lewis Guy	(substituted on) 86'
Manager:
(Republic of Ireland) Sean O'Driscoll

GK	1	(Denmark) Casper Ankergren
DF	2	(England) Frazer Richardson
DF	16	(England) Bradley Johnson
DF	3	(England) Paul Huntington
DF	33	(Slovakia) Ľubomír Michalík
MF	37	(Australia) Neil Kilkenny
MF	14	(England) Jonny Howson (yellow card)
MF	4	(Republic of Ireland) Jonathan Douglas
MF	7	(England) David Prutton (yellow card) 27'	(substituted off) 69'
FW	9	(England) Jermaine Beckford
FW	38	(Scotland) Dougie Freedman	(substituted off) 77'
Substitutes:
FW	20	(Democratic Republic of the Congo) Trésor Kandol	(substituted on) 69'
MF	22	(England) Andrew Hughes	(substituted on) 77'
DF	32	(Republic of Ireland) Alan Sheehan
GK	25	(England) David Lucas
DF	5	(Angola) Rui Marques
Manager:
(Scotland) Gary McAllister

== Post-match ==
Hayter said: "It is an unbelievable feeling to score the winner. I have been dreaming about it all week." The Doncaster manager Sean O'Driscoll suggested that he "could murder a cup of tea" while his opposite number McAllister suggested his team "huffed and puffed but our quality wasn't quite there today. We lost a poor goal." The Leeds goalkeeper Ankergren reflected "maybe in a few days we'll realise the achievement ... but right now we're standing here with nothing."

Leeds finished the following season in fourth place in League One and qualified for the play-offs, where they lost in the semi-finals to Millwall. Doncaster's next season ended with them in fourteenth position in the Championship.

== Sources ==
- Chapman, Daniel (2019). 100 Years of Leeds United. Icon Books Limited. ISBN 978-178578-430-9.
