= 2005–06 AFC Bournemouth season =

Bournemouth
2005–06 season
- Manager: Sean O'Driscoll
- Grounds: Dean Court
- League One: 17th
- FA Cup: First round
- Football League Cup: Second round
- Football League Trophy: Second round
- Top goalscorer: League: James Hayter (20); All: James Hayter (20)

The 2005–06 season saw Bournemouth compete in Football League One where they finished in 17th position with 55 points.

== Final league table ==
Pos	Team	Pld	W	D	L	GF	GA	GD	Pts
15	Yeovil Town	46	15	11	20	54	62	−8	56
16	Chesterfield	46	14	14	18	63	73	−10	56
17	Bournemouth	46	12	19	15	49	53	−4	55
18	Tranmere Rovers	46	13	15	18	50	52	−2	54
19	Blackpool	46	12	17	17	56	64	−8	53

Rules for classification: 1) Points; 2) Goal difference; 3) Goals scored

== Results ==
=== Football League One ===
Match	Date	Opponent	Venue	Result	Attendance	Scorers
1	6 August 2005	Milton Keynes Dons	National Hockey Stadium (Milton Keynes)	2–2	5,163	Hayter (76), Surman (90)
2	9 August 2005	Hartlepool United	Dean Court	1–1	5,406	Rodrigues (64)
3	13 August 2005	Bristol City	Dean Court	2–0	6,544	Stock (20), Hayter (p 50)
4	20 August 2005	Gillingham	Priestfield Stadium	0–1	6,568	
5	27 August 2005	Bradford City	Valley Parade	2–1	7,621	Bower (og 55), Surman (64)
6	29 August 2005	Walsall	Dean Court	0–0	5,953	
7	2 September 2005	Tranmere Rovers	Dean Court	0–0	5,695	
8	10 September 2005	Chesterfield	Saltergate	0–3	3,540	
9	17 September 2005	Swindon Town	Dean Court	2–1	7,276	Hayter (p 24, 68)
10	24 September 2005	Oldham Athletic	Boundary Park	0–1	5,058	
11	27 September 2005	Swansea City	Dean Court	0–1	5,750	
12	1 October 2005	Huddersfield Town	Galpharm Stadium	2–2	13,522	Hayter (p 66, 70)
13	7 October 2005	Doncaster Rovers	Dean Court	2–1	6,578	Surman (82), Stock (90)
14	15 October 2005	Colchester United	Layer Road	1–0	3,120	Keene (90)
15	22 October 2005	Port Vale	Dean Court	1–2	6,320	Surman (23)
16	29 October 2005	Brentford	Griffin Park	2–0	6,625	Keene (26), Hayter (41)
17	12 November 2005	Nottingham Forest	Dean Court	1–1	9,222	Stock (64)
18	19 November 2005	Doncaster Rovers	Belle Vue (Doncaster)	2–4	4,803	Surman (64), Rodrigues (79)
19	26 November 2005	Milton Keynes Dons	Dean Court	2–0	5,485	Foley (36), Cooke (82)
20	6 December 2005	Blackpool	Bloomfield Road	3–1	4,326	Hayter (26, 27, p 68)
21	10 December 2005	Hartlepool United	Victoria Park (Hartlepool)	1–2	3,755	Foley (68)
22	17 December 2005	Gillingham	Dean Court	2–1	6,177	Hayter (66), Surman (90)
23	23 December 2005	Yeovil Town	Huish Park	1–1	8,178	Hayter (p 19)
24	31 December 2005	Southend United	Roots Hall	1–2	6,357	Foley (70)
25	2 January 2006	Scunthorpe United	Dean Court	1–1	6,259	Hayter (85)
26	7 January 2006	Tranmere Rovers	Prenton Park	0–0	6,717	
27	14 January 2006	Rotherham United	Dean Court	2–0	5,700	Foley (2), Hayter (11)
28	21 January 2006	Swindon Town	County Ground (Swindon)	2–4	6,092	Rodrigues (59), Hayter (p 68)
29	28 January 2006	Chesterfield	Dean Court	1–2	5,837	Hayter (p 66)
30	3 February 2006	Swansea City	Liberty Stadium	0–1	12,079	
31	11 February 2006	Oldham Athletic	Dean Court	0–0	5,453	
32	14 February 2006	Rotherham United	Millmoor	0–2	4,498	
33	18 February 2006	Blackpool	Dean Court	1–1	5,349	Pitman (4)
34	25 February 2006	Bristol City	Ashton Gate Stadium	1–3	11,058	Hayter (44)
35	28 February 2006	Barnsley	Dean Court	1–1	5,191	Griffiths (70)
36	11 March 2006	Bradford City	Dean Court	0–1	5,749	
37	18 March 2006	Yeovil Town	Dean Court	1–0	7,959	Fletcher (33)
38	25 March 2006	Barnsley	Oakwell	0–0	9,180	
39	1 April 2006	Southend United	Dean Court	1–1	7,638	Hayter (82)
40	8 April 2006	Scunthorpe United	Glanford Park	2–2	4,136	Hayter (33) O'Connor (63)
41	11 April 2006	Walsall	Bescot Stadium	1–0	4,613	Hayter (17)
42	15 April 2006	Huddersfield Town	Dean Court	1–1	7,406	Fletcher (34)
43	17 April 2006	Port Vale	Vale Park	0–0	4,006	
44	22 April 2006	Colchester United	Dean Court	1–2	6,231	Cooke (8)
45	29 April 2006	Nottingham Forest	City Ground	1–1	26,847	Fletcher (48)
46	6 May 2006	Brentford	Dean Court	2–2	9,359	Foley (45), Fletcher (90)

=== FA Cup ===
Round	Date	Opponent	Venue	Result	Attendance	Scorers
1	5 November 2005	Tamworth	Dean Court	1–2	4,550	Stock (45)

=== Football League Cup ===
Round	Date	Opponent	Venue	Result	Attendance	Scorers
1	24 August 2005	Torquay United	Plainmoor	0–0 (5–4 p)	1,876	
2	20 September 2005	Wigan Athletic	JJB Stadium	0–1	3,346	

=== Football League Trophy ===
Round	Date	Opponent	Venue	Result	Attendance	Scorers
1	18 October 2005	Aldershot Town	Dean Court	4–1	2,657	Pitman (p 33) Keene (76, 83) Cooke (p 80)
2	22 November 2005	Walsall	Bescot Stadium	0–1	2,031	

== Squad statistics ==
Number	Position	Name	Appearances	Goals
1	GK	Neil Moss	6	0
2	DF	Neil Young	46	0
3	DF	Stephen Purches	24	0
4	MF	Marcus Browning	44	0
5	DF	Karl Broadhurst	3	0
6	DF	Shaun Maher	4	0
7	MF	Stephen Cooke	20	3
8	MF	Brian Stock	30	4
9	FW	Dani Rodrigues	16	3
10	FW	Steve Fletcher	23	4
12	DF	James O'Connor	40	1
14	FW	James Hayter	50	20
15	MF	James Coutts	2	0
16	DF	Josh Gowling	13	0
17	MF	Daryl Fordyce	3	0
17	MF	Andrew Surman	28	6
18	DF	Jason Tindall	5	0
19	MF	James Rowe	0	0
20	DF	Eddie Howe	16	0
21	DF	Callum Hart	36	0
22	DF/MF	Shaun Cooper	38	0
23	MF	Kirk Hudson	0	0
23	MF	Ben Rix	7	0
24	GK	Gareth Stewart	45	0
25	DF	Adam Griffiths	6	1
25	MF	James Keene (footballer)	8	4
25	MF	John Spicer	4	0
26	FW	Brett Pitman	5	2
28	DF	Warren Cummings	0	0
29	MF	Steven Foley-Sheridan	36	5
30	DF	Jamie Whisken	0	0
31	DF/MF	Jack Cleverley	0	0
33	FW	Curtis Allen	0	0
34	DF	Aaron Brown	3	0
