= 2011–12 Doncaster Rovers F.C. season =

Doncaster Rovers
2011–12 season
- Chairman: John Ryan
- Manager: Sean O'Driscoll (until 23 September); Dean Saunders (from 23 September)
- Stadium: Keepmoat Stadium
- Championship: 24th (relegated)
- FA Cup: Third round (vs. Notts County)
- League Cup: Second round (vs. Leeds United)
- Top goalscorer: League: Billy Sharp (10); All: Billy Sharp (10)
- Highest home attendance: 12,962 vs Leeds United (14 October)
- Lowest home attendance: 4,339 vs Tranmere Rovers (9 August)
- Average home league attendance: 9,341
Home colours	Away colours

The 2011–12 season was Doncaster Rover's 9th consecutive season in The Football League, and their 4th consecutive in the second tier. This season resulted in relegation and ended their four-year stay in the Championship.

== Season Review ==
=== Kits ===
Doncaster continued with Nike as their kit suppliers and One Call Insurance as their shirt sponsor. Their home kit contained Doncaster's traditional broad red and white hoops however this season they opted for black trimmings on their kit and the red shorts and socks replace last season black ones.

=== Events ===
- 13 May – Doncaster reject a £2.3 million bid for Billy Sharp and a £300,000 bid for James Coppinger from Ipswich Town.
- 1 July – Doncaster reject a £3.25 million bid for Billy Sharp from Southampton. Former Queens Park Rangers striker, Rowan Vine joins on a trial.
- 5 September – Doncaster pay a total of £180,000 to Bury for the transfer of Kyle Bennet after a tribunal was settled, an initial £80,000 was to paid in two separate sums, one being immediately and another in January 2012 with a further £25,000 being paid for every 15 appearances he makes.
- 20 September – Cardiff City's Jon Parkin holds talks over a possible one-month loan deal.
- 23 September – Sean O'Driscoll is placed on gardening leave after 1 draw and 6 losses. Former Wrexham boss Dean Saunders joins on a three-year deal.
- 27 October – Former Wales international John Oster is ruled out for two months to undergo neck surgery.
- 31 October – Senegalese striker El-Hadji Diouf signs a 3-month deal which is later extended to the end of the 2012/13 season.
- 23 November – Midfielder Bolo Zenden opens talks with Doncaster over a potential free transfer.

=== Championship ===
==== Standings ====
Pos	Team	Pld	W	D	L	GF	GA	GD	Pts	Promotion or relegation
20	Bristol City	46	12	13	21	44	68	−24	49	
21	Barnsley	46	13	9	24	49	74	−25	48	
22	Portsmouth (R)	46	13	11	22	50	59	−9	40 (Note: Portsmouth were deducted 10 points for entering administration.)	Relegation to League One
23	Coventry City (R)	46	9	13	24	41	65	−24	40	Relegation to League One
24	Doncaster Rovers (R)	46	8	12	26	43	80	−37	36	Relegation to League One

Updated to match(es) played on 28 April 2012. Source: BBC Sport
Rules for classification: 1) points; 2) goal difference; 3) number of goals scored.
(R) Relegated

==== Results summary ====
Overall								Home						Away					
Pld	W	D	L	GF	GA	GD	Pts	W	D	L	GF	GA	GD	W	D	L	GF	GA	GD
46	8	12	26	43	80	−37	36	4	8	11	22	35	−13	4	4	15	21	45	−24

Last updated: 29 April 2012.

==== Result round by round ====
Round	1	2	3	4	5	6	7	8	9	10	11	12	13	14	15	16	17	18	19	20	21	22	23	24	25	26	27	28	29	30	31	32	33	34	35	36	37	38	39	40	41	42	43	44	45	46
Ground	D	H	H	A	H	A	A	H	H	A	H	A	A	H	H	A	A	H	A	H	A	H	A	A	H	H	A	A	H	A	H	H	A	A	H	H	H	A	A	H	A	H	H	A	A	H
Result	D	D	W	L	D	L	L	W	D	W	L	L	L	D	L	W	L	D	L	W	L	W	L	L	W	D	L	D	L	L	D	D	W	D	D	L	L	L	D	L	L	L	L	D	W	L
Position	12	14	8	24	24	24	24	24	24	20	21	23	23	23	24	24	24	24	24	23	23	23	23	24	23	23	23	22	24	24	24	24	23	23	22	23	23	23	24	24	24	24	24	24	24	24

Updated to match(es) played on 29 April 2012. Source: cardiffcityfc.co.uk
A = Away; H = Home; W = Win; D = Draw; L = Loss

=== FA Cup ===
Round	3
Ground	H
Result	L

=== League Cup ===
Round	1	2
Ground	H	H
Result	W	L

== Squad ==
=== Detailed Overview ===
No.	Name	Nat.	Place of birth	Date of birth	Club apps.	Club goals	Int. caps	Int. goals	Previous club	Date joined	Fee	Contract end
1	Neil Sullivan	(Scotland)	Sutton (England)	24 February 1970	204	0	28	0	Leeds United	15 May 2007	Free	30 June 2013
2	James O'Connor	(England)	Birmingham	20 November 1984	212	5	–	–	Bournemouth	16 May 2006	£130,000	30 June 2012
3	George Friend	(England)	Barnstaple	19 October 1987	35	1	–	–	Wolverhampton Wanderers	14 June 2010	Free	30 June 2013
4	Shelton Martis	(Netherlands Antilles)	Willemstad	29 November 1982	46	3	3	0	West Bromwich Albion	1 February 2010	Undisclosed	30 June 2013
6	James Chambers	(England)	Sandwell	20 November 1980	97	0	–	–	Leicester City	5 August 2008	Free	30 June 2012
7	Martin Woods	(Scotland)	Airdrie	1 January 1986	107	9	–	–	Rotherham United	5 June 2007	Free	30 June 2013
8	Brian Stock	(Wales)	Winchester (England)	24 December 1981	188	22	3	0	Preston North End	3 January 2007	£150,000	30 June 2013
9	Chris Brown	(England)	Doncaster	11 December 1984	22	10	–	–	Preston North End	14 July 2011	Free	30 June 2013
10	El Hadji Diouf	(Senegal)	Dakar	15 January 1981	–	–	–	–	Free Agent	31 October 2011	Free	30 June 2012
11	Adam Lockwood	(England)	Wakefield	26 October 1981	164	8	–	–	Yeovil Town	18 July 2006	Free	30 June 2012
12	James Hayter	(England)	Sandown	9 April 1979	145	34	–	–	Bournemouth	29 May 2007	£200,000	30 June 2012
14	Tommy Spurr	(England)	Leeds	30 September 1987	–	–	–	–	Sheffield Wednesday	28 June 2011	£200,000	30 June 2013
16	John Oster	(Wales)	Boston (England)	8 December 1978	87	1	13	0	Crystal Palace	7 August 2009	Free	30 June 2012
17	Giles Barnes	(England)	London	5 August 1988	–	–	–	–	West Bromwich Albion	4 August 2011	Free	5 May 2012
18	Simon Gillett	(England)	Oxford	6 November 1985	33	1	–	–	Southampton	15 July 2010	Free	30 June 2012
19	Frédéric Piquionne	(France)	Nouméa	8 December 1978	–	–	1	0	West Ham United	5 March 2012	Loan	5 April 2012
20	Oscar Radford	(England)	Rotherham		–	–	–	–	Ferencvárosi	4 August 2011	Free	30 June 2012
21	Sam Hird	(England)	Doncaster	7 September 1987	130	2	–	–	Leeds United	19 June 2007	Free	30 June 2012
22	Fabien Robert	(France)	Hennebont	6 January 1989	–	–	–	–	Lorient	31 January 2012	Loan	30 June 2012
23	Kyle Bennett	(England)	Telford	9 September 1990	–	–	–	–	Bury	1 July 2011	£80,000	30 June 2013
24	Mustapha Dumbuya	(England)	London	7 August 1987	27	0	–	–	N/A	1 July 2009	Trainee	
25	James Baxendale	(England)	Doncaster		–	–	–	–	Leeds United	1 July 2011	Trainee	30 June 2012
26	James Coppinger	(England)	Guisborough	10 January 1981	296	33	–	–	Exeter City	30 June 2004	£30,000	30 June 2014
29	Rachid Bouhenna	(Algeria)			–	–	–	–	Sedan	4 August 2011	Free	30 June 2012
30	Paul Keegan	(Republic of Ireland)	Galway	5 July 1984	10	0	–	–	Bohemians	17 January 2011	Free	31 December 2011
31	Hérita Ilunga	(Democratic Republic of the Congo)	Kinshasa	25 February 1982	15	0	32	1	Free Agent	9 March 2012	Free	9 April 2012
32	Damien Plessis	(France)	Neuville-aux-Bois	5 March 1998	–	–	–	–	Panathinaikos	2 January 2012	Loan	30 June 2012
33	Gary Woods	(England)	Kettering	1 October 1990	17	0	–	–	Manchester United	26 March 2009	Free	30 June 2012
37	Jordan Ball	(England)	Mansfield	12 September 1993	–	–	–	–	N/A	9 August 2011	Trainee	
39	Pascal Chimbonda	(France)	Les Abymes	21 February 1979	–	–	–	–	Free Agent	28 September 2011	Free	30 June 2012
40	James Husband	(England)	Doncaster		–	–	–	–	N/A	21 November 2011	Trainee	30 July 2014
41	Habib Beye	(Senegal)	Suresnes	19 October 1977	–	–	–	–	Free Agent	13 February 2012	Free	30 July 2013
43	Lamine Diatta	(Senegal)	Dakar	2 July 1975	–	–	–	–	Free Agent	7 December 2011	Free	7 February 2012
45	Habib Bamogo	(Burkina Faso)	Paris (France)	8 May 1982	–	–	–	–	Free Agent	2 January 2012	Free	30 June 2012
49	Mamadou Bagayoko	(Mali)	Paris (France)	21 May 1979	–	–	–	–	Free Agent	2 January 2012	Free	30 June 2012
	Sam McMahon	(Scotland)			–	–	–	–	Rangers	4 January 2012	Free	30 June 2012

== Statistics ==
As of 29 April 2012

No.	Pos	Nat	Player	Total		Championship		FA Cup		League Cup	
No.	Pos	Nat	Player	Apps	Goals	Apps	Goals	Apps	Goals	Apps	Goals
1	GK	(Scotland) SCO	Neil Sullivan	9	0	9+0	0	0+0	0	0+0	0
2	DF	(England) ENG	James O'Connor	29	0	24+3	0	1+0	0	0+1	0
3	DF	(England) ENG	George Friend	29	0	24+3	0	0+0	0	2+0	0
4	DF	(Netherlands Antilles) ANT	Shelton Martis	15	0	14+1	0	0+0	0	0+0	0
6	DF	(England) ENG	James Chambers	0	0	0+0	0	0+0	0	0+0	0
7	MF	(Scotland) SCO	Martin Woods	5	0	2+2	0	0+1	0	0+0	0
8	MF	(Wales) WAL	Brian Stock	28	1	25+1	1	1+0	0	0+1	0
9	FW	(England) ENG	Chris Brown	12	3	7+4	2	0+0	0	1+0	1
10	FW	(Senegal) SEN	El Hadji Diouf	23	6	22+0	6	0+1	0	0+0	0
11	DF	(England) ENG	Adam Lockwood	15	0	11+3	0	1+0	0	0+0	0
12	FW	(England) ENG	James Hayter	31	5	17+12	4	1+0	0	1+0	1
14	DF	(England) ENG	Tommy Spurr	21	0	19+0	0	0+0	0	2+0	0
16	MF	(Wales) WAL	John Oster	33	1	23+7	1	0+1	0	2+0	0
17	MF	(England) ENG	Giles Barnes	34	1	23+8	1	1+0	0	1+1	0
18	MF	(England) ENG	Simon Gillett	48	3	43+3	3	0+0	0	2+0	0
19	FW	(France) FRA	Frédéric Piquionne	8	2	8+0	2	0+0	0	0+0	0
20	DF	(England) ENG	Oscar Radford	0	0	0+0	0	0+0	0	0+0	0
21	DF	(England) ENG	Sam Hird	34	0	23+8	0	1+0	0	2+0	0
22	MF	(France) FRA	Fabien Robert	13	2	7+6	2	0+0	0	0+0	0
23	MF	(England) ENG	Kyle Bennett	38	5	15+20	4	1+0	0	2+0	1
24	DF	(England) ENG	Mustapha Dumbuya	11	0	6+4	0	0+0	0	1+0	0
25	MF	(England) ENG	James Baxendale	3	0	0+2	0	0+0	0	0+1	0
26	MF	(England) ENG	James Coppinger	38	2	31+7	2	0+0	0	0+0	0
29	DF	(Algeria) ALG	Rachid Bouhenna	0	0	0+0	0	0+0	0	0+0	0
30	MF	(Republic of Ireland) IRL	Paul Keegan	3	0	1+1	0	0+0	0	0+1	0
31	DF	(Democratic Republic of the Congo) COD	Hérita Ilunga	19	0	19+0	0	0+0	0	0+0	0
32	MF	(France) FRA	Damien Plessis	0	0	0+0	0	0+0	0	0+0	0
33	GK	(England) ENG	Gary Woods	10	0	8+0	0	0+0	0	2+0	0
37	FW	(England) ENG	Jordan Ball	0	0	0+0	0	0+0	0	0+0	0
39	DF	(France) FRA	Pascal Chimbonda	15	0	15+0	0	0+0	0	0+0	0
40	DF	(England) ENG	James Husband	3	0	2+1	0	0+0	0	0+0	0
41	DF	(Senegal) SEN	Habib Beye	23	2	22+0	2	1+0	0	0+0	0
43	DF	(Senegal) SEN	Lamine Diatta	0	0	0+0	0	0+0	0	0+0	0
45	FW	(Burkina Faso) BFA	Habib Bamogo	4	0	4+0	0	0+0	0	0+0	0
49	FW	(Mali) MLI	Mamadou Bagayoko	6	2	2+3	2	1+0	0	0+0	0
	FW	(Scotland) SCO	Sam McMahon	0	0	0+0	0	0+0	0	0+0	0
Players played for Doncaster Rovers this season but who have left the club:
	DF	(England) ENG	Reece Brown	3	0	1+2	0	0+0	0	0+0	0
	GK	(England) ENG	David Button	4	0	3+0	0	1+0	0	0+0	0
	FW	(France) FRA	Marc-Antoine Fortuné	5	1	5+0	1	0+0	0	0+0	0
	MF	(France) FRA	Hérold Goulon	6	0	5+1	0	0+0	0	0+0	0
	GK	(Nigeria) NGR	Carl Ikeme	15	0	15+0	0	0+0	0	0+0	0
	GK	(England) ENG	Chris Kirkland	1	0	1+0	0	0+0	0	0+0	0
	FW	(Slovakia) SVK	Milan Lalkovič	6	0	1+5	0	0+0	0	0+0	0
	MF	(England) ENG	Ryan Mason	5	1	2+2	0	0+0	0	1+0	1
	DF	(England) ENG	Richard Naylor	15	0	13+0	0	0+0	0	2+0	0
	FW	(England) ENG	Jon Parkin	5	0	4+1	0	0+0	0	0+0	0
	FW	(England) ENG	Billy Sharp	20	10	18+2	10	0+0	0	0+0	0
	MF	(England) ENG	Mark Wilson	4	0	0+3	0	0+0	0	0+1	0

=== Goalscorers ===
Place	Position	Nation	Number	Name	Championship	FA Cup	League Cup	Total
1	FW	(England)	~~10~~	Billy Sharp	10	0	0	10
2	FW	(Senegal)	10	El-Hadji Diouf	6	0	0	6
3	MF	(England)	23	Kyle Bennett	4	0	1	5
4	FW	(England)	12	James Hayter	4	0	1	5
5	FW	(England)	9	Chris Brown	2	0	1	3
5	MF	(England)	18	Simon Gillett	3	0	0	3
7	FW	(Mali)	49	Mamadou Bagayoko	2	0	0	2
7	DF	(Senegal)	41	Habib Beye	2	0	0	2
7	MF	(England)	26	James Coppinger	2	0	0	2
7	FW	(France)	19	Frédéric Piquionne	2	0	0	2
7	FW	(France)	22	Fabien Robert	2	0	0	2
12	MF	(England)	17	Giles Barnes	1	0	0	1
12	FW	(France)	~~32~~	Marc-Antoine Fortuné	1	0	0	1
12	MF	(England)	~~13~~	Ryan Mason	0	0	1	1
12	MF	(Wales)	16	John Oster	1	0	0	1
12	MF	(Wales)	8	Brian Stock	1	0	0	1
				TOTALS	43	0	4	47

=== Disciplinary record ===
Number	Nation	Position	Name	Championship		FA Cup		League Cup		Total	
Number	Nation	Position	Name	Yellow card	Red card	Yellow card	Red card	Yellow card	Red card	Yellow card	Red card
41	(Senegal)	DF	Habib Beye	7	2	0	0	0	0	7	2
8	(Wales)	MF	Brian Stock	9	0	0	0	0	0	9	0
11	(England)	DF	Adam Lockwood	3	1	0	0	0	0	3	1
10	(Senegal)	FW	El Hadji Diouf	5	0	1	0	0	0	6	0
42	(France)	MF	Hérold Goulon	0	1	0	0	0	0	0	1
39	(France)	DF	Pascal Chimbonda	5	0	0	0	0	0	5	0
3	(England)	DF	George Friend	5	0	0	0	0	0	5	0
21	(England)	DF	Sam Hird	5	0	0	0	0	0	5	0
23	(England)	FW	Kyle Bennett	4	0	0	0	0	0	4	0
18	(England)	MF	Simon Gillett	4	0	0	0	0	0	4	0
5	(England)	DF	Richard Naylor	4	0	0	0	0	0	4	0
16	(Wales)	MF	John Oster	3	0	0	0	0	0	3	0
9	(England)	FW	Chris Brown	2	0	0	0	0	0	2	0
2	(England)	DF	James O'Connor	2	0	0	0	0	0	2	0
14	(England)	DF	Tommy Spurr	2	0	0	0	0	0	2	0
17	(England)	MF	Giles Barnes	1	0	0	0	0	0	1	0
45	(Burkina Faso)	FW	Habib Bamogo	1	0	0	0	0	0	1	0
12	(England)	FW	James Hayter	1	0	0	0	0	0	1	0
31	(Democratic Republic of the Congo)	DF	Hérita Ilunga	1	0	0	0	0	0	1	0
~~27~~	(Slovakia)	FW	Milan Lalkovič	1	0	0	0	0	0	1	0
26	(England)	MF	James Coppinger	1	0	0	0	0	0	1	0
~~13~~	(England)	MF	Ryan Mason	1	0	0	0	0	0	1	0
22	(France)	FW	Fabien Robert	1	0	0	0	0	0	1	0
~~10~~	(England)	FW	Billy Sharp	1	0	0	0	0	0	1	0
			TOTALS	65	4	2	0	0	0	67	4

=== Penalties ===
Date	Penalty Taker	Scored	Opponent	Competition
9 August	Chris Brown	Yes	Tranmere Rovers	League Cup round 1
29 November	Billy Sharp	Yes	Millwall	Championship match 19
14 February	El-Hadji Diouf	Yes	Blackpool	Championship match 29
3 March	El-Hadji Diouf	Yes	Brighton & Hove Albion	Championship match 32

==== Suspensions Serves ====
Date Given	Matches Missed	Player	Reason	Opponents Missed
19 November	3	Adam Lockwood	Sent Off vs Barnsley	Watford (H), Millwall (A), Southampton (H)
31 December	3	Hérold Goulon	Sent Off vs Watford	Barnsley (H), Notts County (FA), Cardiff (H)
31 December	1	Habib Beye	5x (yellow card)	Barnsley
21 January	3	Habib Beye	Sent Off vs Bristol City	Hull City (A), Reading (H); Crystal Palace (A)

=== Long-Term Injuries ===
Date Suffered	Name	Injury	Date Returned
27 October	John Oster	Neck Injury	7 January

=== Contracts ===
No.	Pos.	Nat.	Name	Age	Status	Contract length	Expiry date	Source
30	MF	(Republic of Ireland)	Keegan	26	✓ Signed	6 Months	December 2011	Doncaster Rovers
1	GK	(Scotland)	Sullivan	41	✓ Signed	1 year	June 2012	Sky Sports
21	DF	(England)	Hird	23	✓ signed	1 year	June 2012	BBC Sport
6	DF	(England)	Chambers	30	✓ signed	1 year	June 2012	Doncaster Rovers
26	MF	(England)	Coppinger	30	✓ Signed	3 years	June 2014	BBC Sport
1	GK	(Scotland)	Sullivan	41	✓ Signed	1 year	June 2013	BBC Sport
19	FW	(Senegal)	Diouf	30	✓ Signed	6 months^{1}	June 2012	BBC Sport
39	DF	(France)	Chimbonda	32	✓ Signed	6 months	June 2012	BBC Sport
17	MF	(England)	Barnes	23	✓ Signed	6 months	May 2012	Sky Sports

Notes
^{1}With the option of a second year.

== Transfers ==
=== In ===
No.	Pos.	Nat.	Name	Age	EU	Moving from	Type	Transfer window	Ends	Transfer fee	Source
14	DF	(England)	Tommy Spurr	23	EU	Sheffield Wednesday	Transfer	Summer	2013	£200,000^{1}	BBC Sport
23	MF	(England)	Kyle Bennett	20	EU	Bury	Transfer	Summer	2013	Undisclosed	BBC Sport
5	DF	(England)	Richard Naylor	34	EU	Leeds United	Free Transfer	Summer	2012	Free	Yorkshire Post
9	FW	(England)	Chris Brown	26	EU	Preston North End	Free Transfer	Summer	2013	Free	Sky Sports
17	MF	(England)	Giles Barnes	22	EU	West Bromwich Albion	Free Transfer	Summer	2012	Free	Official Site
39	DF	(France)	Pascal Chimbonda	32	EU	Free agent	Free Transfer		2012	Free	BBC Sport
19^{2}	FW	(Senegal)	El Hadji Diouf	30	EU	Free agent	Free Transfer		2012	Free	Sky Sports
49	FW	(Mali)	Mamadou Bagayoko	32	EU	PAS Giannina (Greece)	Free Transfer	Winter	2012	Free	Official Site
25	FW	(Burkina Faso)	Habib Bamogo	29	EU	Panetolikos (Greece)	Free Transfer	Winter	2012	Free	Official Site
41	DF	(Senegal)	Habib Beye	34	EU	Aston Villa	Free Transfer	Winter	2013	Free	Sky Sports
31	DF	(Democratic Republic of the Congo)	Hérita Ilunga	30	EU	Free agent	Free Transfer		2012	Free	BBC Sport

Notes

^{1}Although officially undisclosed the fee was reported to be £200,000.

=== Loans in ===
No.	Pos.	Name	Country	Age	Loan club	Started	Ended	Start source	End source
13	MF	Ryan Mason	(England)	20	Tottenham Hotspur	28 July	24 November	BBC Sport	Sky Sports
19	DF	Reece Brown	(England)	19	Manchester United	16 August	10 September	Talksport	BBC Sport
27	FW	Milan Lalkovič	(Slovakia)	18	Chelsea	18 August	18 October	Sky Sports	Tribal Football
19	FW	Jon Parkin	(England)	29	Cardiff City	21 September	24 October	Sky Sports	BBC Sport
31	DF	Hérita Ilunga	(Democratic Republic of the Congo)	29	West Ham United	4 October	6 January	BBC Sport	Sheffield Star
32	GK	Chris Kirkland	(England)	30	Wigan Athletic	12 October	20 October^{1}	BBC Sport	BBC Sport
27	GK	Carl Ikeme	(Nigeria) (England)	25	Wolverhampton Wanderers	10 November	4 January	BBC Sport	BBC Sport
41	DF	Habib Beye	(Senegal) (France)	34	Aston Villa	21 November	2 February	BBC Sport	
42	MF	Hérold Goulon	(France)	27	Blackburn Rovers	23 November	26 January	BBC Sport	Sky Sports
32	FW	Marc-Antoine Fortuné	(France)	30	West Bromwich Albion	24 November	20 December^{2}	BBC Sport	BBC Sport
47	GK	David Button	(England)	23	Tottenham Hotspur	1 January	1 March	BBC Sport	BBC Sport
35	MF	Damien Plessis	(France)	38	Panathinaikos	2 January		Official Site	
22	MF	Fabien Robert	(France)	37	Lorient	31 January		BBC Sport	
27	GK	Carl Ikeme	(Nigeria) (England)	25	Wolverhampton Wanderers	1 March	19 April	BBC Sport	Sunday Express
19	FW	Frédéric Piquionne	(France)	47	West Ham United	6 March		BBC Sport	

Sources: For loan start source see "Start source". For loan end source see "End source".
EU = if holds or not a European Union passport; Country: when 2 flags, 1st flag = country that plays for internationally, 2nd flag = country of birth; No. = number on jersey; P = Position (for position name, pause mouse pointer on abbreviation); Name = Name on jersey (for more extensive name, pause mouse pointer on name); In/Out = In: The player came in on loan, Out: The player went out on loan; Loan club = the club that the player moved on loan to or the club that the player came from on loan; Started = the date when the player's loan started; Ended = the date when the player's loan ended.

Notes
^{1}Kirkland originally signed on a three-month deal till January, but was sent back after a back injury on the date stated.

^{2}Fortuné originally signed until 2 January, but was recalled due to injury problems at West Bromwich Albion.

=== Out ===
No.	Pos.	Name	Country	Age	Type	Moving to	Transfer window	Transfer fee	Apps	Goals	Source
9	FW	Steve Brooker	(England)	29	Out of Contract		Summer	N/A	17	2	Doncaster Rovers
23	DF	Byron Webster	(England)	24	Free Transfer	Northampton Town	Summer	Free	14	0	BBC Sport
25	DF	Dennis Souza	(Brazil)	30	Out of Contract	OFI (Greece)	Summer	N/A	9	0	Doncaster Rovers
5	DF	Wayne Thomas	(England)	32	Out of Contract	Atromitos (Greece)	Summer	Free	18	0	Doncaster Rovers
29	FW	Waide Fairhurst	(England)	22	Transfer	Macclesfield Town	Summer	Undisclosed	13	2	BBC Football
5	DF	Richard Naylor	(England)	34	Released	Rotherham United	Winter	Free	15	0	BBC Sport
22	MF	Dean Shiels	(Northern Ireland)	26	Released	Kilmarnock (Scotland)	Winter	Free	88	10	Official Site
10	FW	Billy Sharp	(England)	25	Transfer	Southampton	Winter	£1,850,000	86	41	BBC Sport
15	MF	Mark Wilson	(England)	32	Free Transfer	Oxford United	Winter	Free	157	3	BBC Sport

EU = if holds or not a European Union passport; Country: when 2 flags, 1st flag = country that plays for internationally, 2nd flag = country of birth; N = number on jersey; P = Position (for position name, pause mouse pointer on abbreviation); Name = Name on jersey (for more extensive name, pause mouse pointer on name); Age = age on the day of the signing; Moving from = only indicate the club the player was playing before start playing for this club in this season, for the type of the moving see Status column; Moving to = only indicates the club the player is going to play next, for the type of the moving see Status column; Ends = when the player's current contract ends; n/a = Not applicable.

=== Loans Outs ===
No.	Pos.	Name	Country	Age	Loan club	Started	Ended	Start source	End source
22	MF	Dean Shiels	(Northern Ireland)	26	Kilmarnock	30 July	11 January	Sky Sports	Official Site
15	MF	Mark Wilson	(England)	32	Walsall	28 October	28 November	BBC Sport	Official Site
25	MF	James Baxendale	(England)	34	Buxton	24 November		Official Site	
24	DF	Mustapha Dumbuya	(England)	24	Crystal Palace	6 January	22 February	BBC Sport	Official Site
25	MF	James Baxendale	(England)	19	Hereford United	22 March	30 May 2012	BBC Sport	
6	DF	James Chambers	(England)	31	Hereford United	22 March	30 May	BBC Sport	

Sources: For loan start source see "Start source". For loan end source see "End source".
EU = if holds or not a European Union passport; Country: when 2 flags, 1st flag = country that plays for internationally, 2nd flag = country of birth; No. = number on jersey; P = Position (for position name, pause mouse pointer on abbreviation); Name = Name on jersey (for more extensive name, pause mouse pointer on name); In/Out = In: The player came in on loan, Out: The player went out on loan; Loan club = the club that the player moved on loan to or the club that the player came from on loan; Started = the date when the player's loan started; Ended = the date when the player's loan ended.

== Fixtures & Results ==
=== Pre-season ===
7 July 2011 Friendly	Armthorpe Welfare	1–1	Doncaster Rovers	Armthorpe, South Yorkshire
19:30 BST				Stadium: Welfare Ground

16 July 2011 Friendly	Barrow	0–2	Doncaster Rovers	Barrow-in-Furness, Cumbria
15:00 BST		Report	Oster 32'; Gillett 43'	Stadium: Holker Street; Attendance: 424; Referee: P Banks

19 July 2011 Friendly	Mansfield Town	0–1	Doncaster Rovers	Mansfield, Nottinghamshire
19:30 BST			Sharp 78'	Stadium: Field Mill; Attendance: 1,576

23 July 2011 Friendly	Carlisle United	1–0	Doncaster Rovers	Brunton Park
15:00	Curran 43'			Attendance: 1,851

26 July 2011 Friendly	Sheffield United	0–1	Doncaster Rovers	Sheffield, South Yorkshire
19:30 BST			Gillett 72'	Stadium: Bramall Lane; Attendance: 5,002

29 July 2011 Friendly	Grimsby Town	0–3	Doncaster Rovers	Cleethorpes, Lincolnshire
19:45 BST		Report	Sharp 39'; Coppinger 41'; Baxendale 80'	Stadium: Blundell Park

=== Championship ===
6 August 2011 1	Brighton & Hove Albion	2–1	Doncaster Rovers	Brighton, East Sussex
15:00	Buckley 83', 90+8'		Sharp 39'	Stadium: Falmer Stadium; Attendance: 20,219; Referee: Eddie Ilderton

13 August 2011 2	Doncaster Rovers	0–1	West Ham United	Doncaster, South Yorkshire
15:00			Nolan 5'	Stadium: Keepmoat Stadium; Attendance: 11,344; Referee: Scott Mathieson

16 August 2011 3	Doncaster Rovers	0–1	Nottingham Forest	Doncaster, South Yorkshire
19:45			Gunter 31'	Stadium: Keepmoat Stadium; Attendance: 9,464; Referee: Woolmer

20 August 2011 4	Derby County	3–0	Doncaster Rovers	Derby, Derbyshire
15:00	Kilbane 6'; S Davies 46'; B Davies 62'			Stadium: Pride Park Stadium; Attendance: 23,377; Referee: Langford

27 August 2011 5	Doncaster Rovers	1–1	Bristol City	Doncaster, South Yorkshire
15:00	Hayter 68'		Adomah 45'	Stadium: Keepmoat Stadium; Attendance: 7,778; Referee: Scott

10 September 2011 6	Cardiff City	2–0	Doncaster Rovers	Cardiff, South Glamorgan
15:00	Gerrard 52'; Earnshaw 70'			Stadium: Cardiff City Stadium; Attendance: 21,863; Referee: Wright

17 September 2011 7	Reading	2–0	Doncaster Rovers	Reading, Berkshire
15:00	Church 52'; Le Fondre 59'			Stadium: Madejski Stadium; Attendance: 15,124; Referee: Salisbury

24 September 2011 8	Doncaster Rovers	1–0	Crystal Palace	Doncaster, South Yorkshire
15:00	Oster 65'			Stadium: Keepmoat Stadium; Referee: Sarginson

27 September 2011 9	Doncaster Rovers	1–1	Hull City	Doncaster, South Yorkshire
19:45	Gillett 58'		Waghorn 25'	Stadium: Keepmoat Stadium; Attendance: 9,786; Referee: Rushton

1 October 2011 10	Peterborough United	1–2	Doncaster Rovers	Peterborough, Cambridgeshire
15:00	McCann 19'		Stock 55'; Bennett 67'	Stadium: London Road Stadium; Attendance: 8,220; Referee: Drysdale

14 October 2011 11	Doncaster Rovers	0–3	Leeds United	Doncaster, South Yorkshire
19:45			Pugh 20'; McCormack 51'; Lees 64'	Stadium: Keepmoat Stadium; Attendance: 12,962; Referee: Friend

18 October 2011 12	Blackpool	2–1	Doncaster Rovers	Blackpool, Lancashire
19:45	Ince 63', 90+4'		Sharp 27'	Stadium: Bloomfield Road; Attendance: 11,587; Referee: Geoff Eltringham

22 October 2011 13	Portsmouth	3–1	Doncaster Rovers	Portsmouth, Hampshire
15:00	Varney 3', 75'; Kitson 68'		Gillett 27'	Stadium: Fratton Park; Attendance: 12,779; Referee: Graham

29 October 2011 14	Doncaster Rovers	1–1	Coventry City	Doncaster, South Yorkshire
15:00	Hayter 60'		Clingan 31'	Stadium: Keepmoat Stadium; Attendance: 8,426; Referee: Webster

1 November 2011 15	Doncaster Rovers	1–3	Middlesbrough	Doncaster, South Yorkshire
19:45	Sharp 14'		Robson 30', 66' (pen.); Emnes 45+1'	Stadium: Keepmoat Stadium; Attendance: 9,792; Referee: Deadman

5 November 2011 16	Ipswich Town	2–3	Doncaster Rovers	Ipswich, East Anglia
15:00	Carson 53'; Chopra 90+4'		Diouf 18', 39'; Sharp 24'	Stadium: Portman Road; Attendance: 17,184; Referee: Hooper

19 November 2011 17	Barnsley	2–0	Doncaster Rovers	Barnsley, South Yorkshire
15:00	Davies 30', 64'			Stadium: Oakwell; Attendance: 11,783; Referee: Friend

26 November 2011 18	Doncaster Rovers	0–0	Watford	Doncaster, South Yorkshire
15:00				Stadium: Keepmoat Stadium; Attendance: 8,389; Referee: Tierney

29 November 2011 19	Millwall	3–2	Doncaster Rovers	London
19:45	Trotter 25' (pen.), 42'; Henderson 84'		Sharp 40' (pen.), 86'	Stadium: The Den; Attendance: 9,062; Referee: D'Urso

3 December 2011 20	Doncaster Rovers	1–0	Southampton	Doncaster, South Yorkshire
15:00	Sharp 60'			Stadium: Keepmoat Stadium; Referee: Haines

10 December 2011 21	Birmingham City	2–1	Doncaster Rovers	Birmingham, West Midlands
15:00	King 62', 88'		Fortuné 50'	Stadium: St Andrew's; Attendance: 17,369; Referee: Miller

17 December 2011 22	Doncaster Rovers	2–1	Leicester City	Doncaster, South Yorkshire
15:00	Sharp 63', 65'		Nugent 38'	Stadium: Keepmoat Stadium; Attendance: 9,461; Referee: Sheldrake

26 December 2011 23	Burnley	3–0	Doncaster Rovers	Burnley, Lancashire
	Rodriquez 37' (pen.); Paterson 84'; Hird 90+5' (o.g.)			Stadium: Turf Moor; Attendance: 16,756

31 December 2011 24	Watford	4–1	Doncaster Rovers	Watford
	Sordell 44', 68'; Eustace 84'; Kightly 90+3'		Sharp 47'; Goulon (red card) 64'	Stadium: Vicarage Road; Attendance: 11,654

2 January 2012 25	Doncaster Rovers	2–0	Barnsley	Doncaster, South Yorkshire
	Hayter 14'; Bennett 89'			Stadium: Keepmoat Stadium; Attendance: 11,446

14 January 2012 26	Doncaster Rovers	0–0	Cardiff City	Doncaster, South Yorkshire
				Stadium: Keepmoat Stadium; Attendance: 8,834

21 January 2012 27	Bristol City	2–1	Doncaster Rovers	Bristol, West Country
15:00	Wood 26'; Cissé 31'		Beye (red card) 32'	Stadium: Ashton Gate Stadium; Attendance: 14,951

31 January 2012 28	Hull City	0–0	Doncaster Rovers	Hull, East Riding of Yorkshire
19:45				Stadium: KC Stadium; Attendance: 19,187

14 February 2012 29	Doncaster Rovers	1–3	Blackpool	Doncaster, South Yorkshire
19:45	Diouf 43' (pen.)		Taylor-Fletcher 20', 34'; Dicko 72'	Stadium: Keepmoat Stadium; Attendance: 8,319

18 February 2012 30	Leeds United	3–2	Doncaster Rovers	Leeds, South Yorkshire
15:00	Townsend 55'; Clayton 80'; Becchio 90'		Bagayoko 32', 54'	Stadium: Elland Road; Attendance: 21,181

25 February 2012 31	Doncaster Rovers	1–1	Peterborough United	Doncaster, South Yorkshire
15:00	Barnes 45'		Barnett 90+3'	Stadium: Keepmoat Stadium

3 March 2012 32	Doncaster Rovers	1–1	Brighton & Hove Albion	Doncaster, South Yorkshire
15:00	Diouf 79'		Mackail-Smith 20'	Stadium: Keepmoat Stadium; Attendance: 8,964

6 March 2012 33	Nottingham Forest	1–2	Doncaster Rovers	Nottingham, Nottinghamshire
19:45	Blackstock 63'		Piquionne 44'; Bennett 47'	Stadium: City Ground; Attendance: 18,521

10 March 2012 34	West Ham United	1–1	Doncaster Rovers	Upton Park, London
15:00	Nolan 9'		Coppinger 73'	Stadium: Boleyn Ground

13 March 2012 35	Doncaster Rovers	1–1	Reading	Doncaster, South Yorkshire
19:45	Bennett 27'		Pearce 73'	Stadium: Keepmoat Stadium; Attendance: 8,287

17 March 2012 36	Doncaster Rovers	1–2	Derby County	Doncaster, South Yorkshire
15:00	Diouf 67'		Robinson 13'; Roberts 55'	Stadium: Keepmoat Stadium; Attendance: 9,791

20 March 2012 37	Doncaster Rovers	0–3	Millwall	Doncaster, South Yorkshire
19:45			Keogh 8'; Kane 13'; Henderson 58'	Stadium: Keepmoat Stadium; Attendance: 7,572

24 March 2012 38	Southampton	2–0	Doncaster Rovers	Southampton, Hampshire
15:00	Sharp 58', 75'			Stadium: St Mary's Stadium; Attendance: 30,209

27 March 2012 39	Crystal Palace	1–1	Doncaster Rovers	Croydon, London
19:45	Easter 57'		Brown 76'	Stadium: Selhurst Park

30 March 2012 40	Doncaster Rovers	1–3	Birmingham City	Doncaster, South Yorkshire
19:45	Piquionne 4'		Murphy 15'; Burke 61'; King 80'	Stadium: Keepmoat Stadium; Attendance: 8,656

7 April 2012 41	Leicester City	4–0	Doncaster Rovers	Leicester, Leicestershire
15:00	Drinkwater 33'; Peltier 47'; Marshall 78'; Gallagher 88'			Stadium: Walkers Stadium; Attendance: 22,054

9 April 2012 42	Doncaster Rovers	1–2	Burnley	Doncaster, South Yorkshire
15:00	Brown 56'		McQuoid 36'; Austin 76' (pen.)	Stadium: Keepmoat Stadium; Attendance: 8,350

14 April 2012 43	Doncaster Rovers	3–4	Portsmouth	Doncaster, South Yorkshire
15:00	Beye 3' (red card) 60'; Robert 5'; Coppinger 67'		Halford 59' (pen.), 65'; Kitson 90'; Futács 90+3'	Stadium: Keepmoat Stadium; Attendance: 8,196

17 April 2012 44	Middlesbrough	0–0	Doncaster Rovers	Middlesbrough, North Yorkshire
19:45				Stadium: Riverside Stadium; Attendance: 14,967

21 April 2012 45	Coventry City	0–2	Doncaster Rovers	Coventry, West Midlands
15:00			Hayter 81' (pen.); Gillett 87'	Stadium: Ricoh Arena; Attendance: 15,124

28 April 2012 46	Doncaster Rovers	2–3	Ipswich Town	Doncaster, South Yorkshire
12:30	Robert 34'; Beye 90'		Smith 10'; Stevenson 29'; Scotland 79' (pen.)	Stadium: Keepmoat Stadium; Attendance: 9,764

=== FA Cup ===
7 January 2012 Round Three	Doncaster Rovers	0–2	Notts County	Doncaster, South Yorkshire
15:00		report	J Hughes 37', 70' (pen.)	Stadium: Keepmoat Stadium; Attendance: 9,535; Referee: Phil Gibbs

=== League Cup ===
9 August 2011 Round One	Doncaster Rovers	3–0	Tranmere Rovers	Doncaster, South Yorkshire
19:45	Brown 5' (pen.); Mason 29'; Bennett 59'	report		Stadium: Keepmoat Stadium; Attendance: 4,339; Referee: Gary Sutton

23 August 2011 Round Two	Doncaster Rovers	1–2	Leeds United	Doncaster, South Yorkshire
19:45	Hayter 2'		Nunez 30', 83'	Stadium: Keepmoat Stadium; Attendance: 8,505

== Overall Summary ==
=== Summary ===
Games Played	49 (46 Championship, 1 FA Cup, 2 League Cup)
Games Won	9 (8 Championship, 0 FA Cup, 1 League Cup)
Games Drawn	12 (12 Championship, 0 FA Cup, 0 League Cup)
Games Lost	28 (26 Championship, 1 FA Cup, 1 League Cup)
Goals Scored	47 (43 Championship, 0 FA Cup, 4 League Cup)
Goals conceded	84 (80 Championship, 2 FA Cup, 2 League Cup)
Goal Difference	−37
Clean Sheets	6 (6 Championship, 0 FA Cup, 0 League Cup)
Yellow Cards	67 (65 Championship, 2 FA Cup, 0 League Cup)
Red Cards	4 (4 Championship, 0 FA Cup, 0 League Cup)
Worst Discipline	Habib Beye (7 yellows, 2 reds)
Best Result	3–0 vs Tranmere Rovers
Worst Result	0–4 vs Leicester City
Most Appearances	Simon Gillett(48 appearances)
Top Scorer	Billy Sharp (10 goals)
Points	36/133 (27.07%)

=== Competition Summary ===
Competition	Started round	Current position / round	Final position / round	First match	Last match
2011–12 Football League Championship	—	24th		6 August 2011	28/29 April 2012
2011-12 Football League Cup	1st Round	—	2nd Round	8 August 2011	23 August 2011
FA Cup	3rd round	—	3rd round	7 January 2012	7 January 2012

Updated to match played 4 June 2011
Source: Competitions
