= 2008–09 Doncaster Rovers F.C. season =

Doncaster Rovers F.C.
2008–09 season
- Manager: Sean O'Driscoll
- Stadium: Keepmoat Stadium
- Championship: 14th
- FA Cup: Fourth round
- League Cup: First round
- Top goalscorer: League: Paul Heffernan (10); All: Paul Heffernan (10)
- Highest home attendance: 14,823 (vs. Sheffield Wednesday, 14 February 2009)
- Lowest home attendance: 9,534 (vs. Swansea City, 1 November 2008)
- Average home league attendance: 11,964
Home colours	Away colours	Third colours

During the 2008–09 English football season, Doncaster Rovers F.C. competed in the Football League Championship.

== Season summary ==
Doncaster endured a tough start to life in the second tier of English football and stood bottom of the league after 24 games with only 4 league wins. However, Doncaster went on an eight-match unbeaten run that lifted them to mid-table, and finished the season in a secure 14th place, above more fancied sides like Crystal Palace and Derby County.

== Squad ==
Squad at end of season

Note: Flags indicate national team as defined under FIFA eligibility rules; some limited exceptions apply. Players may hold more than one non-FIFA nationality.

No.	Pos.	Nation	Player
1	GK	SCO	Neil Sullivan (Note: Sullivan was born in Sutton, England, but qualifies to represent Scotland internationally, and made his international debut for Scotland in 1997.)
2	DF	ENG	James O'Connor
3	DF	WAL	Gareth Roberts
4	DF	NED	Jos van Nieuwstadt
5	DF	ENG	Matthew Mills
6	DF	ENG	James Chambers
7	FW	ENG	Lewis Guy
8	MF	WAL	Brian Stock (Note: Stock was born in Winchester, England, but qualifies to represent Wales internationally, and made his international debut for Wales in September 2009.)
9	FW	JAM	Darren Byfield (Note: Byfield was born in Birmingham, England, but qualifies to represent Jamaica internationally, and made his international debut for Jamaica in 2003.)
10	FW	WAL	Gareth Taylor (Note: Taylor was born in Weston-super-Mare, England, but qualifies to represent Wales internationally through his father, and made his international debut for Wales in 1995.)
11	DF	ENG	Adam Lockwood
12	FW	ENG	James Hayter
13	GK	ENG	Ben Smith
14	FW	IRL	Paul Heffernan
15	MF	ENG	Mark Wilson
16	FW	NIR	Dean Shiels
17	MF	SCO	Martin Woods

No.	Pos.	Nation	Player
18	DF	SCO	Sean McDaid (Note: Sullivan was born in Harrogate, England, but qualifies to represent Scotland internationally, and has represented Scotland at every youth level up to U-20.)
19	MF	ENG	Richie Wellens
20	MF	ENG	John Spicer
21	DF	ENG	Sam Hird
22	GK	WAL	Kyle Letheren (on loan from Barnsley)
23	FW	WAL	Jason Price
24	DF	SCO	Gordon Greer
25	MF	NIR	Stuart Elliott
26	FW	ENG	James Coppinger
27	FW	COD	Kazenga LuaLua (on loan from Newcastle United)
29	FW	ENG	Waide Fairhurst
31	FW	ENG	Tomi Ameobi
32	FW	ENG	Stephen Brooker
33	GK	ENG	Gary Woods
34	MF	ENG	Robbie Clark
35	DF	ENG	Charles Fisher

=== Left club during season ===
Note: Flags indicate national team as defined under FIFA eligibility rules; some limited exceptions apply. Players may hold more than one non-FIFA nationality.

No.	Pos.	Nation	Player
16	DF	ENG	Andrew Boyce (released)
27	MF	ENG	Craig Nelthorpe (to Oxford United)

No.	Pos.	Nation	Player
30	DF	ANT	Shelton Martis (on loan from West Bromwich Albion)

== Competitions ==
=== Championship ===
==== League table ====
Pos	Team	Pld	W	D	L	GF	GA	GD	Pts
12	Sheffield Wednesday	46	16	13	17	51	58	−7	61
13	Watford	46	16	10	20	68	72	−4	58
14	Doncaster Rovers	46	17	7	22	42	53	−11	58
15	Crystal Palace	46	15	12	19	52	55	−3	56 (Note: Crystal Palace were give a one-point deduction for using an ineligible player during a match against Sheffield United on 3 May 2009.)
16	Blackpool	46	13	17	16	47	58	−11	56

Updated to match(es) played on 3 May 2009. Source: The Football League
Rules for classification: 1) points; 2) goal difference; 3) number of goals scored.

==== Results ====
Championship match details
Date	Opponents	Venue	Result	Score F–A	Scorers	Attendance	Ref.
9 August 2008	Derby County	A	W	1–0	Guy 59'	33,010	
16 August 2008	Cardiff City	H	D	1–1	Guy 67'	11,873	
23 August 2008	Queens Park Rangers	A	L	0–2		15,536	
30 August 2008	Coventry City	H	W	1–0	Wellens 31'	11,806	
13 September 2008	Birmingham City	A	L	0–1		18,165	
16 September 2008	Charlton Athletic	H	L	0–1		10,483	
20 September 2008	Bristol City	A	L	1–4	Wellens 69'	15,960	
27 September 2008	Southampton	H	L	0–2		10,867	
30 September 2008	Sheffield United	H	L	0–2		14,242	
4 October 2008	Barnsley	A	L	1–4	Stock 11' pen.	15,086	
18 October 2008	Blackpool	H	D	0–0		11,342	
21 October 2008	Reading	A	L	1–2	van Nieuwstadt 74'	17,294	
25 October 2008	Norwich City	A	L	1–2	Stock 77' pen.	24,543	
28 October 2008	Barnsley	H	L	0–1		13,251	
1 November 2008	Swansea City	H	D	0–0		9,534	
8 November 2008	Sheffield Wednesday	A	L	0–1		20,872	
15 November 2008	Ipswich Town	H	W	1–0	Martis 42'	10,823	
22 November 2008	Burnley	A	D	0–0		12,173	
25 November 2008	Nottingham Forest	H	D	0–0		12,612	
29 November 2008	Watford	A	D	1–1	Brooker 70'	14,008	
6 December 2008	Plymouth Argyle	H	W	1–0	Stock 37'	10,187	
9 December 2008	Preston North End	A	L	0–1		13,152	
13 December 2008	Crystal Palace	A	L	1–2	Heffernan 15'	13,811	
20 December 2008	Wolverhampton Wanderers	H	L	0–1		13,669	
26 December 2008	Nottingham Forest	A	W	4–2	Heffernan 12', 65', Woods 33', Wellens 45'	26,501	
28 December 2008	Burnley	H	W	2–1	Coppinger 37', Stock 40' pen.	14,020	
17 January 2009	Southampton	A	W	2–1	Woods 46', Coppinger 81'	15,837	
27 January 2009	Sheffield United	A	W	1–0	O'Connor 50'	26,555	
30 January 2009	Norwich City	H	D	1–1	Heffernan 23'	12,384	
7 February 2009	Blackpool	A	W	3–2	Stock 26', Hird 54', Coppinger 64'	7,452	
14 February 2009	Sheffield Wednesday	H	W	1–0	Heffernan 31'	14,823	
17 February 2009	Bristol City	H	W	1–0	Heffernan 4'	10,928	
21 February 2009	Swansea City	A	L	1–3	Coppinger 11'	16,161	
27 February 2009	Derby County	H	W	2–1	Heffernan 56', Wilson 71'	14,435	
3 March 2009	Charlton Athletic	A	W	2–1	Coppinger 50', Stock 78' pen.	20,815	
7 March 2009	Cardiff City	A	L	0–3		17,821	
10 March 2009	Queens Park Rangers	H	W	2–0	Stewart 23 o.g., Heffernan 30'	10,223	
14 March 2009	Birmingham City	H	L	0–2		11,482	
17 March 2009	Reading	H	L	0–1		10,393	
21 March 2009	Coventry City	A	L	0–1		18,498	
4 April 2009	Watford	H	L	1–2	Hayter 85'	12,126	
11 April 2009	Ipswich Town	A	W	3–1	Roberts 9', Heffernan 74', Hayter 85'	19,918	
13 April 2009	Preston North End	H	L	0–2		11,648	
18 April 2009	Plymouth Argyle	A	W	3–0	Spicer 15', Hayter 33', Heffernan 70'	11,100	
25 April 2009	Crystal Palace	H	W	2–0	Shiels 45', Hayter 75'	12,031	
3 May 2009	Wolverhampton Wanderers	A	L	0–1		28,252	

=== FA Cup ===
FA Cup match details
Round	Date	Opponents	Venue	Result	Score F–A	Scorers	Attendance	Ref.
Third round	13 January 2009	Cheltenham Town	A	D	0–0		4,417	
Third round replay	20 January 2009	Cheltenham Town	H	W	3–0	Stock 26', 58', Hird 36'	5,345	
Fourth round	24 January 2009	Aston Villa	H	D	0–0		13,517	
Fourth round replay	4 February 2009	Aston Villa	A	L	1–3	Price 45'	24,203	

=== Football League Cup ===
League Cup match details
Round	Date	Opponents	Venue	Result	Score F–A	Scorers	Attendance	Ref.
First round	12 August 2008	Notts County	A	L	0–1 (a.e.t.)		3,272	
