= 2009–10 Doncaster Rovers F.C. season =

Doncaster Rovers
2009–10 season
- Chairman: John Ryan
- Manager: Sean O'Driscoll
- Championship: 12th
- FA Cup: 4th Round (v. Derby County)
- League Cup: 2nd Round (v.Tottenham Hotspur)
- Top goalscorer: League: Billy Sharp 15; All: Billy Sharp 15
- Highest home attendance: 14,850 (v. Newcastle United, Tuesday 23 March 2010)
- Lowest home attendance: 8,833 (v. Swansea City, Tuesday 29 September 2009)
- Average home league attendance: 10,992
Home colours	Away colours	Third colours

The 2009–10 Football League Championship was Doncaster Rovers F.C.'s second season in the Championship. This article shows statistics of the club's players in the season, and also lists all matches that the club has played during the 2009–10 season.

== Match results ==
=== Legend ===
Win	Draw	Loss

=== Football League Championship ===
Match	Date	Opponent	Venue	Result	Attendance	Goalscorers	Report
1	8 August 2009	Watford	Vicarage Road	1–1	15,636	Hayter 38'	Report
2	15 August 2009	Preston North End	Keepmoat Stadium	1–1	10,070	Lockwood 80'	Report
3	18 August 2009	Coventry City	Keepmoat Stadium	0–0	9,848		Report
4	22 August 2009	Middlesbrough	Riverside Stadium	0–2	22,041		Report
5	29 August 2009	Cardiff City	Keepmoat Stadium	2–0	9,742	Lockwood 13', Hayter 17'	Report
6	12 September 2009	Reading	Madejski Stadium	0–0	15,697		Report
7	15 September 2009	West Bromwich Albion	The Hawthorns	1–3	22,184	Fairhurst 7'	Report
8	19 September 2009	Ipswich Town	Keepmoat Stadium	3–3	10,711	Fairhurst 13', Woods 74', Fortune 84'	Report
9	26 September 2009	Scunthorpe United	Glanford Park	2–2	7,945	Woods 13' (Pen), Sharp 61'	Report
10	29 September 2009	Swansea City	Keepmoat Stadium	0–0	8,833		Report
11	3 October 2009	Sheffield United	Bramall Lane	1–1	26,211	Hayter 45'	Report
12	17 October 2009	Barnsley	Keepmoat Stadium	0–1	12,708		Report
13	20 October 2009	Peterborough United	Keepmoat Stadium	3–1	9,288	Sharp 17', Shiels 21', Shackell 85'	Report
14	24 October 2009	Newcastle United	St James' Park	1–2	43,949	Shiels 18'	Report
15	31 October 2009	Blackpool	Keepmoat Stadium	3–3	10,312	Woods 5', Sharp 46', 90'	Report
16	7 November 2009	Plymouth Argyle	Home Park	1–2	9,420	Shiels 29'	Report
17	21 November 2009	Queens Park Rangers	Keepmoat Stadium	2–0	10,821	Sharp 53', Shiels 65'	Report
18	28 November 2009	Nottingham Forest	City Ground	1–4	22,035	Sharp 82'	Report
19	5 December 2009	Crystal Palace	Selhurst Park	3–0	13,955	Sharp 41', Woods 62', Hayter 78'	Report
20	8 December 2009	Sheffield Wednesday	Keepmoat Stadium	1–0	12,825	Sharp 78'	Report
21	12 December 2009	Bristol City	Keepmoat Stadium	1–0	9,572	Sharp 12'	Report
22	19 December 2009	Derby County	Pride Park Stadium	2–0	28,734	Sharp 21', Coppinger 90'+4	Report
23	26 December 2009	Coventry City	Ricoh Arena	0–1	19,221		Report
24	16 January 2010	Watford	Keepmoat Stadium	2–1	10,504	Shiels 50', Roberts 83'	Report
25	26 January 2010	Middlesbrough	Keepmoat Stadium	1–4	10,794	Mutch 83'	Report
26	30 January 2010	Cardiff City	Cardiff City Stadium	1–2	19,730	Roberts 65'	Report
27	6 February 2010	Reading	Keepmoat Stadium	1–2	8,827	Sharp 81' (Pen)	Report
28	9 February 2010	Leicester City	Walkers Stadium	0–0	18,928		Report
29	13 February 2010	Nottingham Forest	Keepmoat Stadium	1–0	12,768	Sharp 31'	Report
30	16 February 2010	Sheffield Wednesday	Hillsborough Stadium	2–0	22,252	Ward 40', O'Connor (o.g.) 64'	Report
31	20 February 2010	Queens Park Rangers	Loftus Road	1–2	11,178	Hayter 51'	Report
32	23 February 2010	Leicester City	Keepmoat Stadium	0–1	11,027		Report
33	27 February 2010	Crystal Palace	Keepmoat Stadium	1–1	9,779	Coppinger 37'	Report
34	6 March 2010	Bristol City	Ashton Gate	5–2	13,401	Emmanuel-Thomas 2', 43', Sharp 12', 34', Orr 61' (o.g.)	Report
35	9 March 2010	Preston North End	Deepdale	1–1	11,942	Hayter 29'	Report
36	13 March 2010	Derby County	Keepmoat Stadium	2–1	11,858	Sharp 15' (Pen), Emmanuel-Thomas 69'	Report
37	16 March 2010	Peterborough United	London Road Stadium	2–1	6,773	Roberts 67', Oster 90'	Report
38	20 March 2010	Sheffield United	Keepmoat Stadium	1–1	13,026	Hayter 5'	Report
39	23 March 2010	Newcastle United	Keepmoat Stadium	0–1	14,850		Report
40	27 March 2010	Barnsley	Oakwell	1–0	14,188	Coppinger 35'	Report
41	3 April 2010	Plymouth Argyle	Keepmoat Stadium	1–2	10,179	Coppinger 58'	Report
42	5 April 2010	Blackpool	Bloomfield Road	0–2	9,701		Report
43	10 April 2010	West Bromwich Albion	Keepmoat Stadium	2–3	12,708	Emmanuel-Thomas 47', Hayter 85'	Report
44	17 April 2010	Ipswich Town	Portman Road	1–1	19,943	Shiels 83' (Pen)	Report
45	24 April 2010	Scunthorpe United	Keepmoat Stadium	4–3	12,124	Emmanuel-Thomas 22', Mutch 45', Hayter 58', Martis 89'	Report
46	2 May 2010	Swansea City	Liberty Stadium	0–0	17,630		Report

=== League Cup ===
Round	Date	Opponent	Venue	Result	Attendance	Goalscorers	Report
1	11 August 2009	Notts County	Meadow Lane	1–0	4,893	Coppinger 54'	Report
2	26 August 2009	Tottenham Hotspur	Keepmoat Stadium	1–5	12,923	Woods 61' (Pen)	Report

=== FA Cup ===
Round	Date	Opponent	Venue	Result	Attendance	Goalscorers	Report
3	19 January 2010	Brentford	Griffin Park	1–0	2,883	O'Connor 87'	Report
4	23 January 2010	Derby County	Pride Park Stadium	0–1	11,316		Report

== Squad statistics ==
Appearances for competitive matches only

No.	Pos.	Name	League		FA Cup		League Cup		Total		Discipline	
No.	Pos.	Name	Apps	Goals	Apps	Goals	Apps	Goals	Apps	Goals	Yellow card	Red card
1	GK	(Scotland) Neil Sullivan	45	0	2	0	0	0	47	0	1	0
2	DF	(England) James O'Connor	33 (5)	0	2	1	1	0	36 (5)	1	3	0
3	DF	(Wales) Gareth Roberts	40 (2)	3	2	0	2	0	44 (2)	3	2	0
4	MF	(England) Jordon Mutch	5 (12)	2	0	0	0	0	5 (12)	2	1	0
5	FW	(England) Billy Sharp	31 (1)	15	2	0	0	0	33 (1)	15	4	0
6	DF	(England) James Chambers	41	0	2	0	1 (1)	0	44 (1)	0	6	0
7	FW	(England) Lewis Guy	1 (12)	0	0 (1)	0	0	0	3 (13)	2	0	0
8	DF	(Wales) Brian Stock	16	0	2	0	1	0	19	0	3	0
10	DF	(England) John Spicer	9 (12)	0	0	0	1 (1)	0	10 (13)	0	0	0
11	DF	(England) Adam Lockwood	10 (6)	2	0	0	2	0	12 (6)	2	0	0
12	FW	(England) James Hayter	29 (10)	9	0	0	1 (1)	0	30 (11)	9	2	0
13	GK	(England) Ben Smith	1 (1)	0	0	0	0	2	3 (1)	0	0	0
14	FW	(Republic of Ireland) Paul Heffernan	6 (11)	0	0 (1)	0	0	0	6 (12)	0	1	0
15	MF	(England) Mark Wilson	29 (6)	0	2	0	0	0	31 (6)	0	1	0
16	MF	(Wales) John Oster	36 (4)	1	2	0	2	0	40 (4)	1	2	1
17	MF	(Scotland) Martin Woods	21 (3)	4	0	0	2	1	23 (3)	5	3	1
18	MF	(Scotland) Sean McDaid	0 (1)	0	0	0	0	0	0 (1)	0	0	0
19	DF	(South Africa) Quinton Fortune	3 (3)	1	0	0	0 (1)	0	3 (4)	1	0	1
20	DF	(England) Jason Shackell	19 (1)	1	2	0	0	0	21 (1)	1	1	0
21	DF	(England) Sam Hird	21 (16)	0	0 (1)	0	1	0	22 (17)	0	0	0
22	FW	(Northern Ireland) Dean Shiels	25 (13)	6	2	0	1	0	28 (13)	6	3	0
23	DF	(England) Byron Webster	1 (4)	0	0	0	1 (1)	0	2 (5)	0	0	0
24	DF	(England) Mustapha Dumbuya	0 (3)	0	0	0	0	0	0 (3)	0	0	0
26	MF	(England) James Coppinger	38 (1)	4	2	0	1	1	41 (1)	5	1	0
29	FW	(England) Waide Fairhurst	2 (4)	2	0	0	0 (1)	0	2 (5)	2	0	0
30	DF	(Netherlands Antilles) Shelton Martis	13 (1)	1	0	0	0	0	13 (1)	1	2	0
31	MF	(England) Simon Gillett	10 (1)	0	0	0	0	0	10 (1)	0	0	0
31	FW	(England) Jay Emmanuel-Thomas	12 (2)	5	0	0	0	0	12 (2)	5	0	0
32	DF	(England) Elliott Ward	6	1	0	0	0	0	6	1	1	0
33	GK	(England) Gary Woods	0	0	0	0	0	0	0	0	0	0
34	MF	(England) Robbie Clark	0	0	0	0	0	0	0	0	0	0
