= James Coppinger =

English footballer (born 1981)

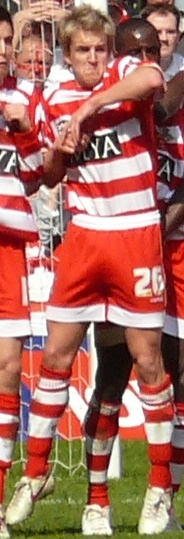
- Coppinger playing for Doncaster Rovers in 2007

Personal information
- Full name: James Coppinger
- Date of birth: 18 January 1981 (age 45)
- Place of birth: Guisborough, England
- Height: 5 ft 7 in (1.70 m)
- Position: Attacking midfielder

Team information
- Current team: Doncaster Rovers (first-team coach)

Youth career
- 1994–1995: Middlesbrough
- 1995–1996: Marton Juniors
- 1996–1997: Woodgarth
- 1997–1998: Darlington
- 1998–1999: Newcastle United

Senior career*
Years	Team	Apps	(Gls)
1999–2002	Newcastle United	1	(0)
1999–2000	→ Hartlepool United (loan)	10	(3)
2001	→ Queens Park Rangers (loan)	0	(0)
2001–2002	→ Hartlepool United (loan)	14	(2)
2002–2004	Exeter City	82	(13)
2004–2021	Doncaster Rovers	614	(67)
2012	→ Nottingham Forest (loan)	6	(0)
Total		727	(85)

International career
1997–1998	England U16	2	(0)
- * Club domestic league appearances and goals

James Coppinger (born 18 January 1981) is an English former professional footballer who played as an attacking midfielder who is currently a first-team coach at Doncaster Rovers.

He began his career at Newcastle United, making one appearance in the Premier League, and later spent two years at Exeter City, but is best known for his ongoing association with Doncaster Rovers, whom he represented over seventeen seasons between 2004 and his retirement in 2021. He is a former England under-16 international.

== Career ==
=== Early career ===
Born in Guisborough, Cleveland, Coppinger started his career as a trainee for Darlington in 1997, though he was signed by fellow north-east side Newcastle United before he even made an appearance. Aged 17, he moved to Newcastle in a £500,000 joint deal with 19-year-old Paul Robinson in March 1998 when Kenny Dalglish was manager.

Coppinger was loaned out to his first loan spell at Hartlepool United in the 1999–00 season. His first loan spell at Hartlepool United was impactful and acknowledged by manager Bobby Robson saying: "Going to Hartlepool toughened him up." Coppinger played in the Magpie's reserves in the pre–season friendly matches, where he scored a hat–trick. His performance led manager Robson calling him to Newcastle United's squad and just played once in the Premier League as a substitute against Tottenham Hotspur on 26 August 2000. However, Coppinger later stated that as a teenager from a small town he was not fully prepared for life as a top-level professional player and he struggled to make any impact while coming through the Newcastle ranks.

Shortly after his making his debut for the Magpies, Coppinger signed a three–year contract with the club. Throughout the 2000–01 season, Coppinger continued to attract interests from Division Three clubs, while playing for Newcastle United's reserve team.

After his loan spell at Queens Park Rangers ended, Coppinger re–joined Hartlepool United on loan for two months. He scored on his second debut for the club, in a 5–1 win against Rushden & Diamonds. Like his first spell at Hartlepool United, Coppinger was a first team regular for the rest of the 2001–02 season. He scored his second goal for the club, in a 5–1 win against Southend United on 23 February 2002. His impressive second loan spell with Hartlepool United led to an extension until the end of the 2001–02 season. Having helped the club secure a play–off place, Coppinger, however, returned to his parent club instead.

After two loan spells at Hartlepool United and Queens Park Rangers, Coppinger's contract at Newcastle was ended by mutual consent and in July 2002 he moved to Exeter City in search of regular first team football.

=== Exeter City ===
He made his debut at Shrewsbury Town on 10 August 2002, netting his first goal two weeks later against Torquay United. Despite suffering injuries in his first season at Exeter City, Coppinger went on to make forty–nine appearances and scoring five times in all competitions.

Coppinger has since stated that the move to the other end of England was a poor career choice at that stage of his development, and he admitted in 2015 that when Exeter were relegated from the Third Division at the end of the 2002–03 season, he was very close to quitting football. He said: "I had a lot of negative things going on in my life. I had a fear of failing – and also a fear of success. The way I was going and the way I was thinking, before I met Terry [Gormley, a motivational speaker], it was only a matter of time before I came out of football." He was persuaded to return to the club by manager Eamonn Dolan, and in his second season with Exeter he was involved in the England C (non-league select) squad, though records suggest he did not gain any official caps at that level.

=== Doncaster Rovers ===
Coppinger was bought by Doncaster manager Dave Penney for a reported £30,000 in May 2004 as he looked to strengthen the squad following promotion to League One. He was a constant feature in the side from the start, though in that first season, he failed to score in his 38 appearances. He scored an average of five goals in future seasons, his first goal eventually coming on 26 November 2005 in a 2–0 victory over Bristol City at Belle Vue.

He scored a hat-trick, described as "three goals of the highest quality" by the TV commentary, in the 2008 play-off semi-final against Southend United in a 5–1 victory which secured a place in the League One play-off final at Wembley against Leeds United. He was in Doncaster's starting eleven for the final, which Doncaster won, gaining promotion to the Championship.

On 14 September 2010, Coppinger scored a hat-trick against Norwich in a 3–1 victory.

On 21 July 2011, he signed a new contract at Doncaster which would keep him at the Keepmoat until 2014. Doncaster were relegated at the end of the 2011–12 season and needed to offload players to reduce the wage bill. As a result, he became a subject of interest from several Championship clubs including Barnsley, who he rejected a move to. After a few games, on 31 August, he was loaned to Nottingham Forest until January 2013 where he joined ex-Rovers players Simon Gillett and Billy Sharp under his former manager, Sean O'Driscoll. Dissatisfaction with the lack of games at Forest led him to return to Rovers after the loan spell.

Coming on as substitute in the 2–1 win over Stevenage on 12 January 2013, Coppinger reached the milestone of 300 league appearances for Doncaster, one of only ten players to do so at the club. On 27 April 2013, in an incredible final match of the season at Griffin Park, Coppinger scored the winning goal in a 1–0 away victory over Brentford in the final seconds of five minutes of added time just moments after Brentford's Marcello Trotta had hit a penalty against the crossbar. If Brentford had won, they would have been promoted and Doncaster would have had to compete in the play-offs. As it was, his goal put Doncaster one point above AFC Bournemouth and they were crowned champions.

Coppinger became only the fifth Rovers player to reach 350 league appearances when he turned out to play right wing-back against Nottingham Forest in a 0–0 draw at the City Ground on 15 March 2014. Doncaster were relegated back to League One on the final day of the 2013–14 season following a 1–0 defeat at Leicester City.

On 9 September 2016, Coppinger won the Football League Two Player of the Month for the month of August. The following day, he celebrated the remarkable milestone of reaching 500 Doncaster appearances by scoring in a 5–1 away victory over Morecambe. On 31 January 2017, Coppinger extended his contract until the end of the 2017–18 season.

In May 2019, he signed a new one-year contract with the club. In July 2020, Coppinger signed another one-year deal. He also confirmed that after 16 years at the club, this would be his final season as a professional footballer.

In commemoration of his seventeen-year career with Doncaster, Coppinger was commissioned to design the club's third kit in support of the CALM charity. The team wore this for the first time in a home match against Hull City on 20 February 2021. Coppinger came on as a second-half substitute and scored a direct free kick to equalise in stoppage time. On 6 March 2021, Coppinger became the first player to reach 600 league appearances for Doncaster Rovers, setting up both goals in a 2–1 win against Plymouth Argyle at the Keepmoat Stadium. He is the 21st player in Football League history to reach this milestone. On 29 April 2021, in the EFL End of Season awards, Coppinger was awarded the Sir Tom Finney award, presented to a player who has contributed an enormous amount to the EFL during their career. On 9 May 2021, Coppinger announced his retirement after club record of 695 games.

== Post-playing career ==
In April 2022, Coppinger returned to Doncaster Rovers in the role of head of football operations. Following the 2022–23 season in the role, he became head of recruitment in June 2023. In May 2025, he transitioned into the role of first-team coach on a full-time basis.

== Personal life ==
Doncaster Rovers have worked with the NSPCC since the beginning of 2009. In June 2011, Coppinger, along with Mark Wilson, James O'Connor, other Rovers staff and local Doncaster businessmen David Plant and Brian Butcher walked the 62-mile Inca Trek raising almost £50,000 for the charity. He has also set up 'Pro Mindset', a mentoring and support service for footballers, and 'Kixx Middlesbrough', a local youth coaching academy.

In January 2013, along with several other people, including fellow footballers, Coppinger faced a race-fixing inquiry with allegations of corruption in gambling on horses to lose on Betting exchanges in nine races between 1 November 2010 and 31 March 2011. He strongly denied the charges, though was found guilty of corrupt and fraudulent practices by the British Horseracing Authority and given a three-year ban from any dealings with registered racing individuals.

He received the Freedom of the Borough of Doncaster on 21 May 2022.

== Career statistics ==
As of match played 9 May 2021

Appearances and goals by club, season and competition
Club	Season	League			National Cup		League Cup		Continental		Other		Total	
Club	Season	Division	Apps	Goals	Apps	Goals	Apps	Goals	Apps	Goals	Apps	Goals	Apps	Goals
Newcastle United	1999–2000	Premier League	0	0	0	0	0	0	0	0	—		0	0
Newcastle United	2000–01	Premier League	1	0	0	0	0	0	—		—		1	0
Newcastle United	2001–02	Premier League	0	0	0	0	0	0	0	0	—		0	0
Newcastle United	Total		1	0	0	0	0	0	0	0	—		1	0
Hartlepool United (Loan)	1999–2000	Third Division	10	3	0	0	0	0	—		1 (Note: Includes match in the Third Division play-offs)	0	11	3
Hartlepool United (Loan)	2001–02	Third Division	14	2	0	0	0	0	—		0	0	14	2
Hartlepool United (Loan)	Total		24	5	0	0	0	0	—		1	0	25	5
Exeter City	2002–03	Third Division	43	5	3	0	1	0	—		2 (Note: Includes matches in the EFL Trophy)	0	49	5
Exeter City	2003–04	Football Conference	39	8	—		—		—		1 (Note: Includes match in the FA Trophy)	1	40	9
Exeter City	Total		82	13	3	0	1	0	—		3	1	89	14
Doncaster Rovers	2004–05	League One	31	0	2	0	3	0	—		2	0	38	0
Doncaster Rovers	2005–06	League One	36	5	2	0	5	0	—		0	0	43	5
Doncaster Rovers	2006–07	League One	39	4	3	0	2	1	—		4	0	48	5
Doncaster Rovers	2007–08	League One	39	3	2	0	1	0	—		4 (Note: Includes 1 match in the EFL Trophy and 3 matches in the League One play-offs)	3	46	6
Doncaster Rovers	2008–09	Championship	32	5	4	0	1	0	—		—		37	5
Doncaster Rovers	2009–10	Championship	39	4	2	0	1	1	—		—		42	5
Doncaster Rovers	2010–11	Championship	40	7	2	0	0	0	—		—		42	7
Doncaster Rovers	2011–12	Championship	38	2	1	0	1	0	—		—		40	2
Doncaster Rovers	2012–13	League One	25	2	0	0	2	0	—		0	0	27	2
Doncaster Rovers	2013–14	Championship	41	4	0	0	2	0	—		—		43	4
Doncaster Rovers	2014–15	League One	34	4	4	1	3	1	—		2	0	43	6
Doncaster Rovers	2015–16	League One	39	3	2	0	2	0	—		1	0	44	3
Doncaster Rovers	2016–17	League Two	39	10	0	0	0	0	—		0	0	39	10
Doncaster Rovers	2017–18	League One	38	3	3	2	1	0	—		0	0	42	5
Doncaster Rovers	2018–19	League One	43	4	5	0	1	0	—		2	0	51	4
Doncaster Rovers	2019–20	League One	29	3	3	1	0	0	—		1	0	33	4
Doncaster Rovers	2020–21	League One	32	4	1	1	1	0	—		3	0	37	5
Doncaster Rovers	Total		614	67	36	5	26	3	—		19	3	695	78
Nottingham Forest (loan)	2012–13	Championship	6	0	0	0	0	0	—		—		6	0
Career total			727	85	39	5	27	3	0	0	23	4	816	97

== Honours ==
Doncaster Rovers

- Football League One: 2012–13; play-offs: 2008
- Football League Trophy: 2006–07

Individual

- EFL League Two Player of the Month: August 2016
- PFA Team of the Year: 2016–17 League Two
- Doncaster Rovers Player of the Year: 2017–18
- Sir Tom Finney Award: 2021
