= Sam Hird =

English footballer (born 1987)

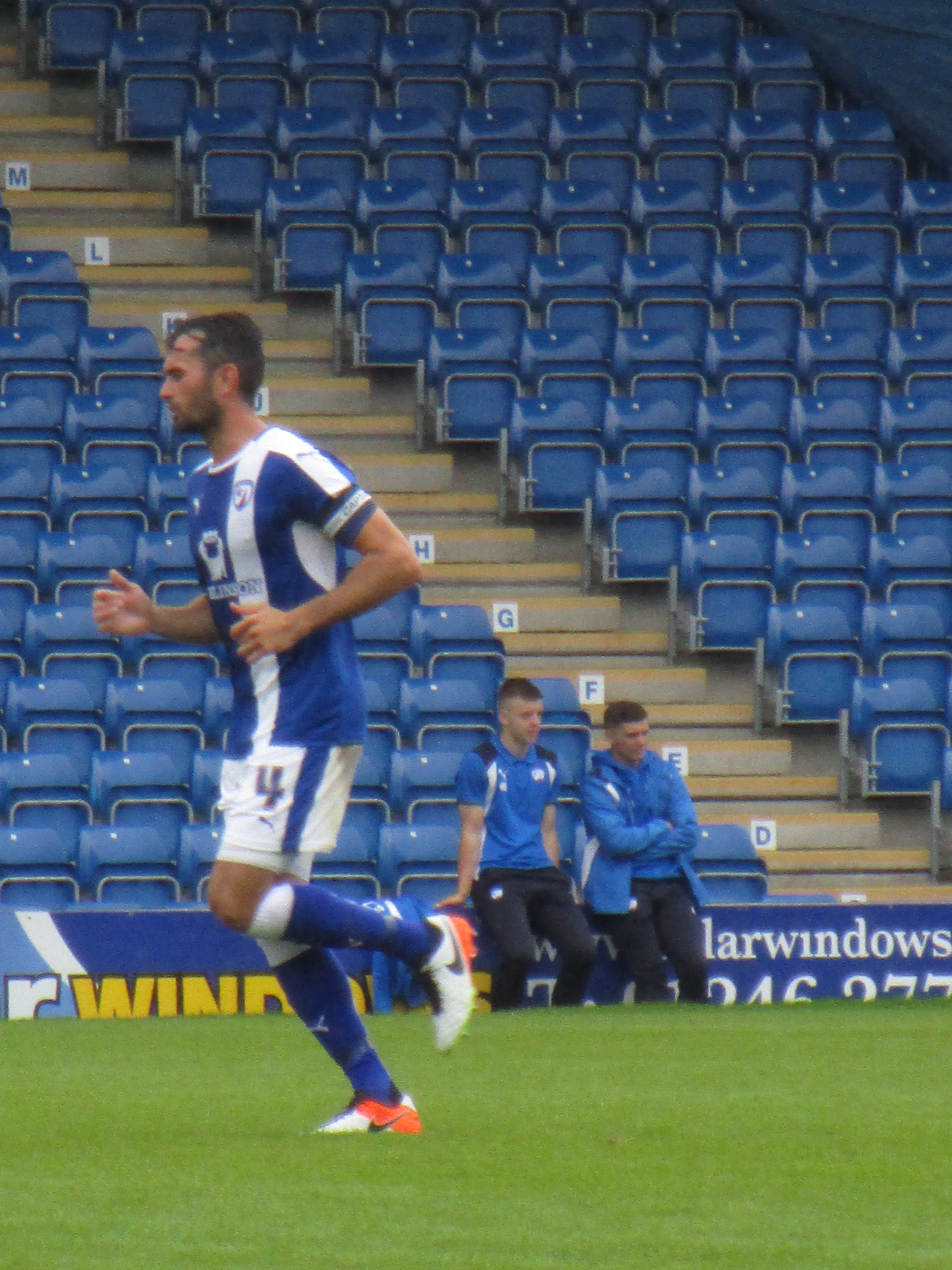
- Hird playing for Chesterfield in 2016

Personal information
- Full name: Adrian Samuel Hird
- Date of birth: 7 September 1987 (age 39)
- Place of birth: Doncaster, England
- Height: 1.83 m (6 ft 0 in)
- Positions: Centre back; defensive midfielder

Youth career
- –1997: Aston Villa
- 1997–2005: Leeds United

Senior career*
Years	Team	Apps	(Gls)
2005–2007	Leeds United	0	(0)
2007	→ Doncaster Rovers (loan)	5	(0)
2007–2012	Doncaster Rovers	140	(1)
2007–2008	→ Grimsby Town (loan)	17	(0)
2012–2018	Chesterfield	203	(10)
2018–2019	Alfreton Town	3	(0)
2019–2021	Barrow	59	(1)
Total		427	(12)

Managerial career
- 2021–2022: Bolton Wanderers Reserves
- * Club domestic league appearances and goals

Adrian Samuel Hird (born 7 September 1987) is an English football coach and former professional footballer.

As a player he was central defender or defensive midfielder and notably had lengthy spells with both Doncaster Rovers and Chesterfield. He also played for Grimsby Town, Alfreton Town and Barrow.

== Playing career ==
=== Leeds United ===
Born in Norton, Doncaster, South Yorkshire, Hird signed terms with Aston Villa at a young age after catching the eyes of scouts, before moving on to sign for the Leeds United Academy at the age of ten. Hird initially played as a striker before being developed into a defender at Leeds. He captained the youth and reserve sides before moving on.

=== Doncaster Rovers ===
Hird was signed by Doncaster Rovers on a three-month loan from Leeds United in February 2007. He was released by Leeds at the end of the 2006–07 season and was signed by Doncaster Rovers on 2 July 2007. He joined Grimsby Town on a month's loan in November 2007. This was extended for a second month in December.

Hird broke into the Doncaster side late in the 2007–08 season after an injury crisis hit Rovers in defence. Hird put in several impressive performances and was part of the side that beat Leeds United (his former club) 1–0 at Wembley Stadium in the League One play-off final to win promotion to the Championship.

Hird formed an impressive partnership with Matt Mills in Rovers first season in the Championship. He has been in and out of the team over the years, but was always seen as a dependable squad player in a very impressive rovers team. In 2011 Hird once again signed a contract extension, this time for an extra year. In May 2012, Hird was released by the club, after turning down the offer of a new contract to join Chesterfield.

=== Chesterfield ===
On 2 June 2012 he agreed a 2-year deal with Chesterfield, and was immediately given the captain's armband. On 16 May 2014, Hird signed a new contract with the Spireites. In July 2014 Hird played a key role in his club's 3–1 pre-season win against his first club, Aston Villa of the Premier League, scoring the first goal in a 3–1 win. Hird signed a new deal keeping him at the 'Spireites' until the summer of 2017 after a successful first season with the club in League One after reaching the play-offs.

After the 2015–16 season, Hird was named Chesterfield's Player of the Year, as well as winning the additional Player of the Year awards from several club sponsors and local newspapers. Hird missed a large part of the 2017–18 season through injury, in which Chesterfield were relegated. He was released by Chesterfield at the end of the 2017–18 season after making over 230 appearances during a 6-year period.

On 22 October 2018, Hird joined National League North side Alfreton Town on a month to month contract in order to gain match fitness after a long spell out injured.

=== Barrow ===
On 8 January 2019, Hird joined National League side Barrow on a free transfer from Alfreton Town.

The following season, Hird gained promotion back to the Football League as Barrow were crowned champions under the guide of the player's former teammate Ian Evatt.

In their first season back in the EFL, Hird was a regular for the Cumbrian side under David Dunn, then captaining the side under caretaker manager Rob Kelly over the Christmas period, when a good run of results put the club in a healthy position before appointing Michael Jolley as new manager. Jolley oversaw a huge turnaround of players in the January window, whilst also dropping a number of players from the squad, including Hird himself. After losing 5 of his first 8 games in charge, Jolley was sacked by the Cumbrian club and Rob Kelly once again took over as caretaker manager, with the difficult task of keeping the Cumbrians in the EFL. Hird became Kelly's assistant for the remainder of the season, and Barrow succeeded in maintaining their spot in League Two, being five points above the relegation zone. Hird eventually decided to retire from his playing career, aged 33.

== Coaching career ==
In January 2018, Hird began studying for his UEFA B coaching licence, along with ex teammate Tommy Lee, and gained it in January 2019. As of 2022 Hird is a UEFA A licence coach.

=== Barrow ===
Hird took over as assistant manager to Rob Kelly at Barrow towards the end of February 2021, with the club being at the bottom of the League Two table, and eventually helped the club keep their spot.

=== Bolton Wanderers ===
On 2 July 2021, Hird joined League One side Bolton Wanderers as first team coach, linking up once again with former teammate and Manager Ian Evatt. He also stepped in as the Manager of Bolton's 'B' team. On 27 May 2022, his role as Bolton Wanderers 'B' team Manager was taken over by Matt Craddock with Hird solely focusing as first team coach. In November 2022 he turned down the York City Manager's role, preferring to stay in his coaching role at Bolton. He left his role at Bolton on 30 September 2023, having accepted a role at the Professional Footballers' Association.

== Career statistics ==
Appearances and goals by club, season and competition
Club	Season	League			FA Cup		League Cup		Other		Total	
Club	Season	Division	Apps	Goals	Apps	Goals	Apps	Goals	Apps	Goals	Apps	Goals
Leeds United	2006–07	Championship	0	0	0	0	0	0	0	0	0	0
Doncaster Rovers (loan)	2006–07	League One	5	0	0	0	0	0	0	0	5	0
Doncaster Rovers	2007–08	League One	4	0	0	0	0	0	5 (Note: Two appearances in Football League Trophy, three appearances in Football League One play-offs)	0	9	0
Doncaster Rovers	2008–09	Championship	37	1	4	1	1	0	0	0	42	2
Doncaster Rovers	2009–10	Championship	36	0	2	0	1	0	0	0	39	0
Doncaster Rovers	2010–11	Championship	32	0	2	0	1	0	0	0	35	0
Doncaster Rovers	2010–11	Championship	31	0	1	0	2	0	0	0	34	0
Doncaster Rovers	Total		145	1	9	1	5	0	5	0	164	2
Grimsby Town (loan)	2007–08	League Two	17	0	1	0	0	0	0	0	18	0
Chesterfield	2012–13	League Two	41	2	1	0	1	0	1 (Note: Appearance(s) in Football League Trophy)	0	44	2
Chesterfield	2013–14	League Two	35	2	2	0	1	0	6	0	44	2
Chesterfield	2014–15	League One	28	3	5	0	1	0	2 (Note: Appearances in Football League One play-offs)	0	36	3
Chesterfield	2015–16	League One	40	2	1	0	1	0	1	0	43	2
Chesterfield	2016–17	League One	35	1	0	0	1	0	1 (Note: Appearance(s) in EFL Trophy)	0	37	1
Chesterfield	2017–18	League Two	24	0	1	0	1	0	1	0	27	0
Chesterfield	Total		203	10	10	0	6	0	12	0	231	10
Alfreton Town	2018–19	National League North	3	0	1	0	–	–	0	0	4	0
Barrow	2018–19	National League	11	0	0	0	–	–	0	0	11	0
Barrow	2019–20	National League	33	0	1	0	–	–	1 (Note: Appearance in FA Trophy)	0	35	0
Barrow	2020–21	League Two	15	1	1	0	1	0	2	0	19	1
Barrow	Total		59	1	2	0	1	0	3	0	65	1
Career total			427	12	23	1	12	0	20	0	482	13

== Honours ==
Doncaster Rovers

- Football League One play-offs: 2008
- Football League Trophy: 2006–07

Chesterfield

- Football League Two: 2013–14
- Football League Trophy runner-up: 2013–14

Barrow

- National League: 2019–20

Individual

- Chesterfield Player of the Year: 2015–16
