= James O'Connor (footballer, born 1984) =

English footballer (born 1984)

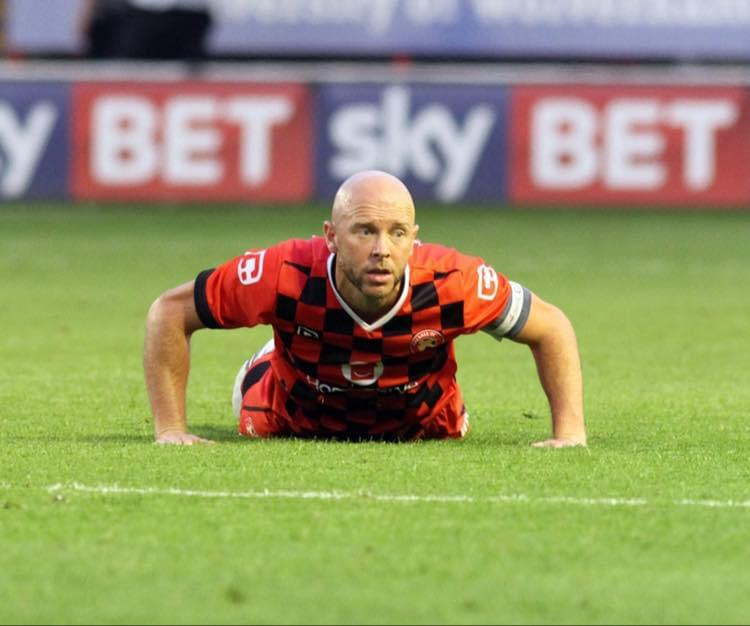
- O'Connor playing for Walsall in 2017

Personal information
- Full name: James Francis Edward O'Connor
- Date of birth: 20 November 1984 (age 42)
- Place of birth: Birmingham, England
- Height: 5 ft 10 in (1.78 m)
- Position: Defender

Youth career
- 1997–2004: Aston Villa

Senior career*
Years	Team	Apps	(Gls)
2004–2005	Aston Villa	0	(0)
2004	→ Port Vale (loan)	13	(0)
2005	→ AFC Bournemouth (loan)	6	(0)
2005–2006	AFC Bournemouth	39	(1)
2006–2012	Doncaster Rovers	215	(4)
2012–2014	Derby County	22	(1)
2013–2014	→ Bristol City (loan)	3	(0)
2014–2017	Walsall	109	(2)
2017–2019	Kidderminster Harriers	43	(3)
Total		450	(11)

Managerial career
- 2019: Kidderminster Harriers (caretaker)
- * Club domestic league appearances and goals

James Francis Edward O'Connor (born 20 November 1984) is an English former professional footballer and manager.

O'Connor played as a played as a defender. He won the FA Youth Cup with the Aston Villa youth team, and played on loan at Port Vale, before making his name with AFC Bournemouth in the 2005–06 season. He was brought to Doncaster Rovers for a £130,000 fee in May 2006. He established himself as an essential first-team player for the club, helping Sean O'Driscoll's side to the Football League Trophy in 2007 and promotion out of the League One play-offs in 2008. Voted Player of the Season at the club in 2009–10, he lost his first-team place under Dean Saunders during the 2011–12 relegation campaign as Doncaster were relegated to League One. In August 2012, he joined Derby County for an undisclosed fee. He was transfer listed in May 2013 and loaned out to Bristol City from September 2013 until January 2014. He signed with Walsall in June 2014 and remained at the club for three seasons. He dropped into non-League football with Kidderminster Harriers in October 2017 and was appointed caretaker manager there in April 2019. He retired as a player in November 2019, having made 503 league and cup appearances in a 15-year playing career, scoring 13 goals.

== Career ==
=== Aston Villa ===
O'Connor went to Wheelers Lane Boys' School in Birmingham between 1996 and 2001. He joined the Aston Villa youth set-up in 1997 after his P.E teacher Mr Alan Miller recommended O'Connor to the club as a creative midfield player. He instead established himself as a strong defender and started in the 2002 FA Youth Cup final win against Everton. A traffic collision early in the year had ruled him out for several weeks, and he missed the first leg of the semi-final but returned to help his side resist an Everton attack fronted by Wayne Rooney in the final. Turning professional with Aston Villa in 2004, later in the year, he enjoyed a three-month loan spell at League One side Port Vale to gain first-team experience. He played 15 games for Martin Foyle's "Valiants" in 2004–05. After returning to Villa Park and featuring heavily in the Premier League Reserves title-winning team, he joined AFC Bournemouth on loan for the remainder of the season in League One.

=== AFC Bournemouth ===
After a successful loan spell, he joined Bournemouth permanently at the end of the 2004–05 season after Villa agreed to an undisclosed transfer. O'Connor quickly became an integral part of the team, making his name as an energetic and pacey player, playing in either one of the full-back positions. He scored his first and only goal for the "Cherries", a thumping half volley, from 25 yards (23 m) out; in a 2–2 draw with Scunthorpe United at Glanford Park on 8 April 2006. Recovering from a hand injury, he helped manager Sean O'Driscoll to keep the Dean Court club five points above the League One relegation zone in 2005–06.

=== Doncaster Rovers ===
In May 2006, he was sold to Doncaster Rovers for £130,000 due to Bournemouth's financial difficulties, after manager Dave Penney offered him a three-year contract. Only four months into his career at the Keepmoat Stadium, his former boss Sean O'Driscoll was installed into the management position at Doncaster. O'Connor made a solid start to his Rovers career in the 2006–07 season with consistent performances throughout the season in defence. He capped a fine season by helping the club to Football League Trophy success following a 3–2 win over Bristol Rovers at the Millennium Stadium, where he was named man of the match. He scored his first goal for the club in a 4–0 away win at Brentford. In the 2007–08 season, O'Connor began to excel in the right-back slot, providing width and speed to the Rovers attacks and playing his part as a key player in a solid defence. He recovered from a hernia operation in February to play a vital part in the club's promotion campaign. O'Connor was again named man of the match as Doncaster beat Leeds United in the League One play-off final at Wembley Stadium. Not long after this he pledged his future to Doncaster by signing a new three-year contract.

During the following season, O'Connor helped Doncaster to secure a 14th-place finish in the Championship. Along the way, he scored the only goal in their win against Sheffield United at Bramall Lane. O'Connor was awarded all three of the club's available supporters awards, including Player of the Season, for the 2009–10 season after a succession of good performances at right-back and centre-half. He scored his only goal of the season away at Brentford in the FA Cup third round. He started the 2010–11 season by scoring Doncaster's first goal of the season in a 2–0 win over Preston North End at Deepdale. He went on to make 37 starts despite an injury-hampered season, with one of the highlights being his second goal of the season against local rivals Scunthorpe United in a 3–1 win at Glanford Park. O'Connor continued to be a vital part of the Rovers team until he lost his first-team place a few months after Dean Saunders took charge of the club in September 2011, and watched from the sidelines as "Donny" were relegated out of the Championship in last place in 2011–12.

=== Derby County ===
On 1 August 2012, O'Connor joined Derby County for an undisclosed fee, signing a two-year contract with an option for a further year. O'Connor made his debut at Pride Park in a 2–2 draw with Sheffield Wednesday on 18 August, coming on for Nathan Tyson as a 74th-minute substitute. He made his first start three days later, in a 2–0 defeat to Bolton Wanderers at the Reebok Stadium. Two days after the Bolton match, Derby manager Nigel Clough praised O'Connor by saying; "With only two [league] games played this season, we've seen the value of James already. He can play anywhere across the back four and he just slots in with no fuss whatsoever. He's a good, competent Championship player and there aren't too many about like him who can come in and do a job in so many positions; he's a very good and important player to have in the camp." He scored his first goal for the "Rams" in a 2–0 home win over Barnsley on 6 November. O'Connor covered at left-back for the injured Gareth Roberts in December 2012, after he fell behind Jake Buxton and Mark O'Brien in the pecking order in central defence. In February 2013, it was reported that O'Connor had picked up a knee injury. In March, he returned to full first-team training, with a scheduled return to the match-day squad for Derby's game on Good Friday, 29 March. However, he did not make a first-team appearance before the end of the campaign and ended the 2012–13 season with 23 appearances. In May 2013, O'Connor was informed that he would not figure regularly at Pride Park during the upcoming 2013–14 season and was allowed to look for a move elsewhere. In August, it was reported the O'Connor was training with Bristol City of League One with the view of a permanent transfer.

On 2 September 2013, O'Connor signed a loan deal until 13 January with Bristol City, again linking up with Sean O'Driscoll with a view to a permanent transfer. However, he soon picked up a career-threatening ruptured thigh injury in just his fourth appearance. He was ruled out for the remainder of the 2013–14 season and was released in the summer by new manager Steve McClaren.

=== Walsall ===
On 21 June 2014, O'Connor signed a one-year contract with League One side Walsall. "Saddlers" manager Dean Smith had this to say: "In James, we have signed an extremely reliable and solid defender. There were a lot of teams interested in him when he left Derby County, but I am delighted that he has chosen to come here. It certainly is a big bonus for us and I look forward to working with him." He was surprisingly not named in the starting lineup for the 2015 Football League Trophy final at Wembley Stadium, a 2–0 defeat to Bristol City, but denied rumours that he and Smith had fallen out over the issue. He was frequently used at right-back during the 2014–15 season, but returned to centre-back for the final stretch of the season as he helped Walsall to steer clear of the relegation zone, and led to him being nominated for the League One Player of the Month award.

O'Connor was a key player in the Saddlers 2015–16 campaign, where they missed out on automatic promotion by a single point. He scored two goals that season, including a goal against Premier League champions Chelsea in the League Cup fourth round. He dedicated the goal to his late grandad, who had died hours before. In March 2016, he signed a two-year extension to his contract to keep him at the club until summer 2018. Interim manager Jon Whitney stated that "he's been one of our most consistent performers this year and his experience is invaluable, on and off the pitch". Walsall struggled at the start of the 2016–17 season, before a switch to a 3–5–2 formation helped to shore up the defence. O'Connor left the club by mutual consent on 31 August 2017 after he was told that he did not feature in manager Jon Whitney's first-team plans.

=== Kidderminster Harriers ===
On 2 October 2017, O'Connor signed for National League North club Kidderminster Harriers on a three-year contract. His signing was seen as a big coup by manager John Eustace as O'Connor turned down offers from Football League clubs to go to Aggborough. However, he was diagnosed with an Achilles problem in February and was ruled out of action for most of the rest of the 2017–18 season. Following the sacking of Mark Yates on 21 April, O'Connor was appointed caretaker manager for the final two matches of the 2018–19 season. He was appointed assistant manager in the summer of 2020. When Penn was sacked in January 2024, O'Connor stayed in post so as "to provide some kind of transition between Penn and his successor". However, new manager Phil Brown named Neil McDonald as his assistant.

== Style of play ==
O'Connor was a versatile defender capable of playing across any position in the back four. Media coverage and tactical analyses frequently noted his defensive discipline alongside his contribution to attacking play.

== Career statistics ==
Appearances and goals by club, season and competition
Club	Season	League			FA Cup		League Cup		Other		Total	
Club	Season	Division	Apps	Goals	Apps	Goals	Apps	Goals	Apps	Goals	Apps	Goals
Aston Villa	2004–05	Premier League	0	0	0	0	0	0	—		0	0
Port Vale (loan)	2004–05	League One	13	0	0	0	—		2 (Note: Appearances in the Football League Trophy)	0	15	0
AFC Bournemouth (loan)	2004–05	League One	6	0	—		—		—		6	0
AFC Bournemouth	2005–06	League One	39	1	1	0	1	0	2	0	43	1
AFC Bournemouth	Total		45	1	1	0	1	0	2	0	49	1
Doncaster Rovers	2006–07	League One	40	1	3	0	3	0	3	0	49	1
Doncaster Rovers	2007–08	League One	43	0	2	0	2	0	2	0	49	0
Doncaster Rovers	2008–09	Championship	32	1	4	0	0	0	—		36	1
Doncaster Rovers	2009–10	Championship	38	0	2	1	1	0	—		41	1
Doncaster Rovers	2010–11	Championship	34	2	2	0	1	0	—		37	2
Doncaster Rovers	2011–12	Championship	28	0	1	0	1	0	—		30	0
Doncaster Rovers	Total		215	4	14	1	8	0	5	0	242	5
Derby County	2012–13	Championship	22	1	1	0	0	0	—		23	1
Derby County	2013–14	Championship	0	0	0	0	0	0	—		0	0
Derby County	Total		22	1	1	0	0	0	—		23	1
Bristol City (loan)	2013–14	League One	3	0	0	0	0	0	1	0	4	0
Walsall	2014–15	League One	32	1	0	0	1	0	2	0	35	1
Walsall	2015–16	League One	37	1	4	0	3	1	3 (Note: One appearance in the Football League Trophy and two in League One play-offs)	0	47	2
Walsall	2016–17	League One	40	0	0	0	0	0	0	0	40	0
Walsall	2017–18	League One	0	0	0	0	0	0	0	0	0	0
Walsall	Total		109	2	4	0	4	1	5	0	122	3
Kidderminster Harriers	2017–18	National League North	19	0	2	0	—		3 (Note: Two appearances in FA Trophy, one in National League North play-offs)	0	24	0
Kidderminster Harriers	2018–19	National League North	24	3	0	0	—		0	0	24	3
Kidderminster Harriers	Total		43	3	2	0	0	0	3	0	48	3
Career total			450	11	22	1	13	1	18	0	503	13

== Honours ==
Aston Villa

- FA Youth Cup: 2001–02

Doncaster Rovers

- Football League One play-offs: 2008
- Football League Trophy: 2006–07

Walsall

- Football League Trophy runner-up: 2014–15

Individual

- Doncaster Rovers Player of the Year: 2009–10
