= Gary Woods (footballer) =

English footballer

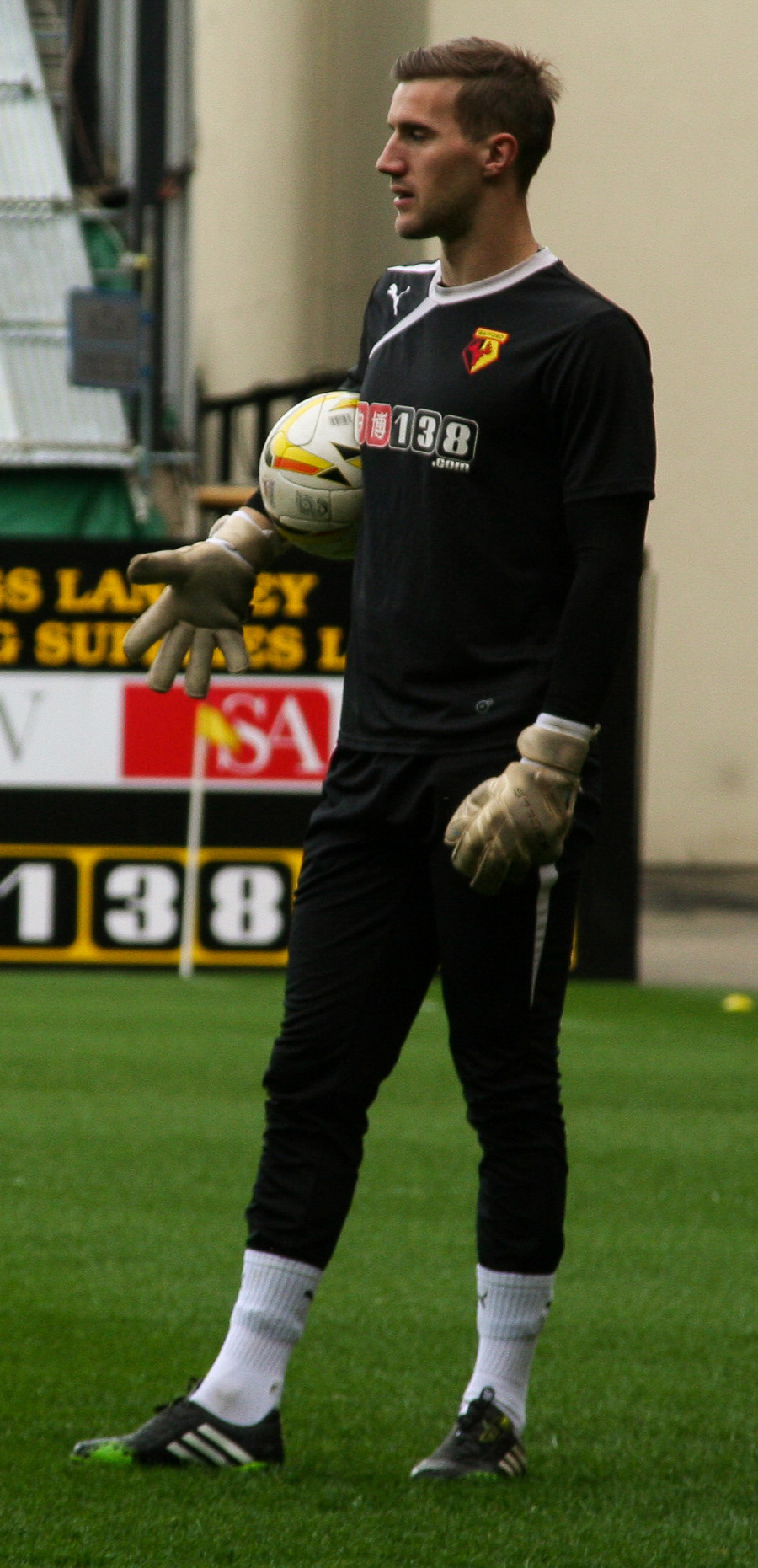

Personal information
- Full name: Gary Woods
- Date of birth: 1 October 1990 (age 36)
- Place of birth: Kettering, England
- Height: 1.83 m (6 ft 0 in)
- Position: Goalkeeper

Team information
- Current team: Greenock Morton
- Number: 33

Youth career
- –2007: Cambridge United
- 2007–2008: Manchester United

Senior career*
Years	Team	Apps	(Gls)
2009–2013	Doncaster Rovers	73	(0)
2013–2014	Watford	1	(0)
2014–2016	Leyton Orient	17	(0)
2015–2016	→ Ross County (loan)	12	(0)
2016–2019	Hamilton Academical	85	(0)
2019–2021	Oldham Athletic	15	(0)
2020–2021	→ Aberdeen (loan)	3	(0)
2021–2022	Aberdeen	4	(0)
2022–2023	Kilmarnock	2	(0)
2023–2024	Exeter City	8	(0)
2024–	Greenock Morton	6	(0)

International career^{‡}
2007	England U18	1	(0)
- * Club domestic league appearances and goals as of 11 June 2025 ‡ National team caps and goals as of 23:41, 24 August 2008 (UTC)

Gary Woods (born 1 October 1990) is an English footballer who plays as a goalkeeper for Scottish Championship club Greenock Morton. He has previously played for Exeter City, Watford, Doncaster Rovers, Leyton Orient, Ross County, Hamilton Academical, Oldham Athletic, Aberdeen and Kilmarnock.

== Club career ==
=== Manchester United ===
Born in Kettering, Northamptonshire, Woods joined Manchester United from Cambridge United in July 2007 after trials with a host of Premier League sides, including Arsenal. Described by Manchester United's under-18 coach Paul McGuinness as "a strong, brave goalkeeper with a strong personality",

=== Doncaster Rovers ===
Woods joined Doncaster Rovers on a free transfer on 26 March 2009, signing a contract which would end at the end of 2009–10 season. He made his professional debut one month later on 25 April 2009, when he replaced Neil Sullivan in the final minute of a 2–0 victory against Crystal Palace.

Having started sporadically started in the 2011–12, Woods became first-choice goalkeeper in 2012–13 as Doncaster returned to League One following relegation from the Championship. However, despite playing 49 of 53 games as Doncaster took the League One title, he was released at the end of the season.

=== Watford ===
Having trained with the club since the previous month, Woods signed a one-year deal with Championship side Watford on 9 September 2013.

=== Leyton Orient ===
After one season with Watford, Woods signed for League One side Leyton Orient on 17 July 2014 on a two-year deal. After 17 league appearances for Orient during the 2014–15 season, he found himself as number two behind Alex Cisak. On 1 September 2015, Woods went on loan with Scottish club Ross County until January 2016. In May 2016, he was released from Leyton Orient when it was announced that he would not be retained when his contract expired.

=== Ross County ===
Woods arrived on loan at Ross County from Leyton Orient on 1 September 2015, and made his debut off the bench in a 2–1 loss against rivals Inverness Caledonian Thistle in Dingwall. His first full game was in a 2–0 win against second placed Aberdeen. After an injury for Scott Fox against Dundee United, Woods started in the Scottish League Cup Final against Hibernian on 13 March 2016. Ross County won 2–1 with Woods playing a pivotal role in the game, denying Hibernian player Liam Fontaine an equalising goal in injury time.

=== Hamilton Academical ===
Woods signed for Hamilton Academical in July 2016. He made his debut on 15 October 2016, in a 2–2 draw away to Partick Thistle. He left the club in May 2019.

=== Oldham Athletic ===
On 25 June 2019, he signed a two-year deal with League Two side Oldham Athletic. On 21 September 2020 Woods, and teammate David Wheater, were removed from the first team and forced to train with the youth team as Oldham had been trying to force them out of their contracts.

=== Aberdeen ===
On 5 October 2020, Woods moved to Aberdeen on a short-term loan agreement. On 12 January 2021, it was announced that the loan had been extended until the end of the 2020–21 season. On 7 May 2021, Woods signed a pre-contract agreement to join Aberdeen on a two-year deal in summer 2021. Woods was released from his contract with Aberdeen on 24 June 2022.

=== Kilmarnock ===
Woods signed a one-year contract with Kilmarnock on 22 July 2022.

=== Exeter City ===
Woods' contract with Kilmarnock was terminated on the 31 January 2023. It was announced on the 1 February 2023 that the goal-stopper had signed for Exeter City until the end of the 2022-23 season. On 11 May 2023 Woods' signed a one-year contract extension to remain with the club for the 2023–24 season.

=== Greenock Morton ===
On 8 July 2024, Woods joined Greenock Morton on a two-year deal as a player-coach upon the expiration of his contract with Exeter City.

== International career ==
Having previously played Victory Shield football for England at under-16 level, Woods made his debut for the England under-18 side on 20 November 2007 as a substitute for Alex Smithies during a 2–0 friendly win over Ghana.

== Career statistics ==
As of match played 19 September 2023

Appearances and goals by club, season and competition
Club	Season	League			National Cup		League Cup		Other		Total	
Club	Season	Division	Apps	Goals	Apps	Goals	Apps	Goals	Apps	Goals	Apps	Goals
Doncaster Rovers	2008–09	Championship	1	0	0	0	0	0	—		1	0
Doncaster Rovers	2009–10	Championship	0	0	0	0	0	0	—		0	0
Doncaster Rovers	2010–11	Championship	16	0	0	0	0	0	—		16	0
Doncaster Rovers	2011–12	Championship	14	0	0	0	2	0	—		16	0
Doncaster Rovers	2012–13	EFL League One	42	0	2	0	3	0	2 (Note: Appearances in the Football League Trophy)	0	49	0
Doncaster Rovers	Total		73	0	2	0	5	0	2	0	82	0
Watford	2013–14	Championship	0	0	0	0	0	0	—		0	0
Leyton Orient	2014–15	EFL League One	17	0	1	0	3	0	2	0	23	0
Leyton Orient	2015–16	EFL League Two	0	0	0	0	0	0	0	0	0	0
Leyton Orient	Total		17	0	1	0	3	0	2	0	23	0
Ross County (loan)	2015–16	Scottish Premiership	12	0	2	0	2	0	—		16	0
Hamilton Academical	2016–17	Scottish Premiership	21	0	1	0	0	0	—		22	0
Hamilton Academical	2017–18	Scottish Premiership	32	0	1	0	4	0	—		37	0
Hamilton Academical	2018–19	Scottish Premiership	32	0	0	0	3	0	—		35	0
Hamilton Academical	Total		85	0	2	0	7	0	0	0	94	0
Oldham Athletic	2019–20	EFL League Two	15	0	0	0	1	0	0	0	16	0
Oldham Athletic	2020–21	EFL League Two	0	0	0	0	0	0	0	0	0	0
Oldham Athletic	Total		15	0	0	0	1	0	0	0	16	0
Aberdeen (loan)	2020–21	Scottish Premiership	3	0	2	0	0	0	0	0	5	0
Aberdeen	2021–22	Scottish Premiership	5	0	0	0	0	0	0	0	5	0
Exeter City	2022–23	EFL League One	7	0	0	0	0	0	0	0	7	0
Exeter City	2023–24	EFL League One	1	0	0	0	0	0	1	0	2	0
Exeter City	Total		8	0	0	0	0	0	1	0	9	0
Greenock Morton	2024–25	Scottish Championship	0	0	0	0	0	0	0	0	0	0
Career total			218	0	9	0	18	0	5	0	250	0

== Honours ==
Doncaster Rovers

- Football League One: 2012–13

Ross County

- Scottish League Cup: 2015–16
