= Neil Sullivan =

Scottish footballer (born 1970)

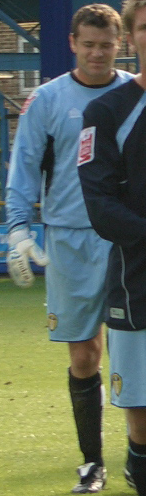
- Sullivan in 2005

Personal information
- Full name: Neil Sullivan
- Date of birth: 24 February 1970 (age 56)
- Place of birth: Sutton, England
- Height: 6 ft 3 in (1.91 m)
- Position: Goalkeeper

Youth career
- 1986–1988: Wimbledon

Senior career*
Years	Team	Apps	(Gls)
1988–2000	Wimbledon	181	(0)
1992	→ Crystal Palace (loan)	1	(0)
2000–2003	Tottenham Hotspur	64	(0)
2003–2004	Chelsea	4	(0)
2004–2007	Leeds United	95	(0)
2006	→ Doncaster Rovers (loan)	3	(0)
2007	→ Doncaster Rovers (loan)	13	(0)
2007–2013	Doncaster Rovers	184	(0)
2012–2013	→ AFC Wimbledon (loan)	20	(0)
Total		565	(0)

International career
1997–2003	Scotland	28	(0)
- * Club domestic league appearances and goals

Neil Sullivan (born 24 February 1970) is a former professional football player and coach. He played as a goalkeeper from 1988 until 2013, playing in the Premier League for Wimbledon, Tottenham Hotspur and Chelsea, and represented Scotland internationally.

He started his career with Wimbledon, and remained with The Dons for twelve years during which he made 181 league appearances. He also at times covered for the likes of Dave Beasant, Hans Segers and Paul Heald, and also spent a period on loan at Crystal Palace. In 2000, he moved to Tottenham Hotspur where he replaced Ian Walker as the club's favoured keeper. In 2003, he departed Tottenham after losing his place in the team and was signed as a back-up keeper by rivals Chelsea.

In 2004, he moved to freshly relegated Football Championship side Leeds United where he remained until 2007. Whilst at Leeds he eventually lost his place in the team and was loaned out to Doncaster Rovers in both 2006 and 2007. In 2007, he joined Rovers on a permanent deal where he remained the club's favoured keeper until the 2012–13 season when he was loaned to AFC Wimbledon, the side formed after the relocation of his first club. Sullivan returned to Doncaster towards the end of the year and aided Doncaster to the League One title. In July 2013, he announced he was leaving Doncaster. After rejecting offers to prolong his playing career, he started working as a goalkeeping coach.

Between 1997 and 2003, Sullivan was capped 28 times by Scotland. He was selected for the 1998 FIFA World Cup, where he was the second choice goalkeeper behind Jim Leighton.

== Club career ==
=== Wimbledon ===
Sullivan was born in Sutton, Greater London. He began his career with local club Wimbledon in 1988, amassing a total of 224 appearances between 1988 and 2000. It was during his tenure at Wimbledon that Sullivan was often acknowledged as one of the best goalkeepers in the league marked by his selection for the division's 1997–98 team of the season.

He was initially an understudy for Hans Segers, and then spent the 1995–96 season vying with Paul Heald for the job as Wimbledon's regular goalkeeper, before making the position his own for the 1996–97 season.

Sullivan conceded a famous goal by David Beckham scored from the halfway line, while he was off his line, in August 1996. He also played one game on loan for Crystal Palace in 1992.

=== Tottenham Hotspur ===
In 2000, after Wimbledon's relegation, Sullivan moved from Wimbledon to Tottenham Hotspur, where he made over 80 appearances. He helped Tottenham reach the 2002 Football League Cup Final which they lost to Blackburn Rovers.

=== Chelsea ===
Chelsea began the 2003–04 season with three senior goalkeepers; Carlo Cudicini, Marco Ambrosio and Jurgen Macho. However, Jurgen Macho picked up a serious knee injury and Chelsea moved to replace him with Sullivan. Sullivan was to compete with Ambrosio for providing back up to Cudicini. He made his debut in a League Cup tie against Reading on 3 December 2003. His league debut followed against Portsmouth on 28 December 2003. In all Sullivan made eight appearances for Chelsea, four of which came in the league.

=== Leeds United ===
In June 2004, he was signed by Leeds United, by manager Kevin Blackwell to replace Paul Robinson who had left Leeds to join Tottenham. Sullivan beat off competition for number one spot from young goalkeeper Scott Carson. Leeds were debt-ridden and had just been relegated from the Premier League when Sullivan joined them.

In his first season (2004–05), he was voted as the club's Player of the Year after some superb saves throughout the season, including saving several penalties for Leeds in games against Wolverhampton Wanderers, Cardiff City, Burnley and Nottingham Forest. Leeds finished 10 points off the playoffs after a season of rebuilding. In his second season at Leeds he continued his penalty saving prowess, saving one in a 1–0 win away at Stoke City, and Leeds went on to reach the playoff final against Watford with Sullivan again having a decent season. But the playoff final ended in defeat for Leeds, losing 3–0 and Sullivan scoring an own goal.

Due to an injury picked up in the pre-season match against Nottingham Forest, Sullivan made few appearances in the 2006–07 campaign for Leeds, with loan goalkeeper Tony Warner filling in whilst Sullivan was injured. Kevin Blackwell was sacked and replaced by Dennis Wise. Wise decided to sign Graham Stack on loan to compete with Warner and Sullivan. On 23 November 2006, he moved on loan to Doncaster Rovers. His loan was however cut short and he returned to Leeds on 21 December 2006. Manager Dennis Wise told the press after Leeds' 2–1 victory against Coventry City that Sullivan had put on weight, and his performances were not as good, hence his loan to Doncaster. Leeds signed Casper Ankergren as the new number one goalkeeper. Sullivan re-signed on loan for Doncaster Rovers in February 2007. After the end of his loan at Doncaster, Sullivan returned to Leeds but was released at the end of his contract.

=== Doncaster Rovers ===
On 15 May 2007, Sullivan returned to Doncaster. He became the regular first team keeper and his consistent performances throughout the 2007–08 season helped Doncaster to promotion. He made an error in the 2–1 loss to Yeovil Town on 21 March 2008, mis-controlling a backpass which led to a Yeovil goal, but the disappointment of this mistake was overshadowed by a very successful season between the sticks, in which Sullivan kept an impressive 20 clean sheets. He overcame this to help Doncaster win promotion to the Championship with a playoff final win over former club Leeds United, leaving them in the third tier of the Football League for at least another year.

Sullivan was also credited with a man-of-the-match performance against Aston Villa on 24 January 2009 which gave Doncaster a 0–0 draw that helped keep them in the FA Cup.

The veteran goalkeeper continued to be an ever-present in the Rovers side throughout the 2009–10 season, appearing in all 46 league games for the club. In 2010, Sullivan signed a one-year contract extension for Rovers, meaning he would be at the club until the end of the 2010–11 campaign. However, he had an injury-hit season, and was eventually replaced by Gary Woods as no.1. At the end of the season, he signed another one-year extension.

On 16 November 2012, Sullivan joined AFC Wimbledon on a short-term loan from Doncaster Rovers and made his debut the following day against Aldershot. On 2 December 2012 Sullivan started in the FA Cup 2nd round match against MK Dons, which they lost 2–1.

With first choice keeper Gary Woods injured, Doncaster recalled him for their game at AFC Bournemouth on 9 March 2013. Following his return to the Rovers' team from his loan spell in March 2013, Sullivan went on to play till the end of the season as Doncaster won the League One title and sealed automatic promotion to the Championship. It was later announced that he would be retained by the club for the following season. On 11 July 2013, Doncaster Rovers confirmed that Sullivan had left the club.

== International career ==
Sullivan was capped 28 times by Scotland between 1997 and 2003. He was named in the Scottish squad for the 1998 FIFA World Cup in France, but was an unused substitute in all of Scotland's three matches. Sullivan became the first choice Scotland goalkeeper after Jim Leighton retired from international football later in 1998, and he played regularly during the Euro 2000 and 2002 World Cup qualification groups.

== Coaching career ==
After gaining promotion to the Championship with Doncaster Rovers, Sullivan turned down the offer of extending his playing career at the club as well as an ambassadorial role in favour of returning to former club Leeds United as academy goalkeeper coach on 16 July. With an injury to Leeds substitute goalkeeper Jamie Ashdown, Sullivan revealed he had not officially retired from playing and would be willing to register himself as a player for the 2013/14 season. In the summer of 2014, Sullivan became the first team goalkeeping coach for the 2014–15 season, under head coaches Dave Hockaday, Darko Milanic and Neil Redfearn.

For the start of the 2015–16 season under new Leeds head coach Uwe Rösler, Sullivan reverted to his original role as the Leeds United academy goalkeeper coach. After the appointment of goalkeeper coach Richard Hartis on 9 June 2015, Leeds confirmed Sullivan had returned to his role as academy goalkeeper coach. In 2020, shortly after Leeds United were promoted back to the Premier League, Sullivan was relieved of his duties.

Sullivan then took a coaching role with the Hull City academy, which he retired from in June 2024.

== Career statistics ==
=== Club ===
Appearances and goals by club, season and competition
Club	Season	League			FA Cup		League Cup		Football League Trophy		Play Offs		Total	
Club	Season	Division	Apps	Goals	Apps	Goals	Apps	Goals	Apps	Goals	Apps	Goals	Apps	Goals
Wimbledon	1989–90	First Division	0	0	0	0	0	0	—		—		0	0
Wimbledon	1990–91	First Division	1	0	0	0	0	0	—		—		1	0
Wimbledon	1991–92	First Division	1	0	0	0	0	0	—		—		1	0
Wimbledon	1992–93	Premier League	1	0	0	0	0	0	—		—		1	0
Wimbledon	1993–94	Premier League	2	0	0	0	0	0	—		—		2	0
Wimbledon	1994–95	Premier League	11	0	0	0	0	0	—		—		11	0
Wimbledon	1995–96	Premier League	16	0	8	0	0	0	—		—		24	0
Wimbledon	1996–97	Premier League	36	0	7	0	7	0	—		—		50	0
Wimbledon	1997–98	Premier League	38	0	5	0	1	0	—		—		44	0
Wimbledon	1998–99	Premier League	38	0	3	0	5	0	—		—		46	0
Wimbledon	1999–2000	Premier League	37	0	2	0	5	0	—		—		44	0
Wimbledon	Total		181	0	25	0	18	0	—		—		224	0
Crystal Palace (loan)	1991–92	First Division	1	0	0	0	0	0	—		—		1	0
Tottenham Hotspur	2000–01	Premier League	35	0	5	0	3	0	—		—		43	0
Tottenham Hotspur	2001–02	Premier League	29	0	4	0	5	0	—		—		38	0
Tottenham Hotspur	2002–03	Premier League	0	0	0	0	0	0	—		—		0	0
Tottenham Hotspur	Total		64	0	9	0	8	0	—		—		81	0
Chelsea	2003–04	Premier League	4	0	2	0	2	0	—		—		8	0
Leeds United	2004–05	Championship	46	0	1	0	3	0	—		—		50	0
Leeds United	2005–06	Championship	42	0	2	0	3	0	—		3	0	50	0
Leeds United	2006–07	Championship	7	0	1	0	2	0	—		—		10	0
Leeds United	Total		95	0	4	0	8	0	—		3	0	110	0
Doncaster Rovers (loan)	2006–07	League One	16	0	—		—		1	0	—		17	0
rowspan="6" Doncaster Rovers	2007–08	League One	46	0	2	0	2	0	2	0	3	0	55	0
2008–09	Championship	46	0	4	0	1	0	—		—		51	0	
2009–10	Championship	45	0	2	0	0	0	—		—		47	0	
2010–11	Championship	31	0	2	0	1	0	—		—		34	0	
2011–12	Championship	9	0	0	0	0	0	—		—		9	0	
2012–13	League One	4	0	—		—		—		—		4	0	
Total		200	0	10	0	4	0	3	0	3	0	220	0	
AFC Wimbledon (loan)	2012–13	League Two	20	0	1	0	—		—		—		21	0
Career total			565	0	51	0	40	0	3	0	6	0	665	0

=== International ===
Appearances and goals by national team and year
National team	Year	Apps	Goals
Scotland	1997	2	0
Scotland	1998	2	0
Scotland	1999	9	0
Scotland	2000	6	0
Scotland	2001	6	0
Scotland	2002	2	0
Scotland	2003	1	0
Total		28	0

== Honours ==
Tottenham Hotspur

- Football League Cup runner-up: 2001–02

Doncaster Rovers

- Football League One: 2012–13; play-offs: 2008
- Football League Trophy: 2006–07

Individual

- Tottenham Hotspur Player of the Year: 2001
- Leeds United Player of the Year: 2004–05

== See also ==
- List of Scotland international footballers born outside Scotland
