= Jos van Nieuwstadt =

Dutch former footballer (born 1979)

Jos Nieuwstadt
Personal information
- Date of birth: 19 November 1979 (age 46)
- Place of birth: Waalwijk, Netherlands
- Height: 1.86 m (6 ft 1 in)
- Position: Centre-back

Senior career*
Years	Team	Apps	(Gls)
1998–2006	Willem II	138	(2)
2006–2008	Excelsior	65	(1)
2008–2009	Doncaster Rovers	16	(1)
2009–2010	SC Cambuur	3	(0)
2010–2011	Hoek	28	(0)
2011–2012	FC Lienden	29	(1)
2012–2014	VV Capelle	31	(1)
Total		310	(6)
- * Club domestic league appearances and goals

Jos van Nieuwstadt (born 19 November 1979) is a Dutch former professional footballer who played as a centre-back.

== Career ==
Previously, Nieuwstadt played for SC Cambuur after his contract with Doncaster Rovers was terminated by mutual consent on 31 August 2009. At Doncaster he scored once against Reading in 16 league appearances. Despite putting in a number of solid displays for Doncaster, he struggled to hold down a regular starting place with the Yorkshire side. Aside from Doncaster Rovers his other former clubs include Willem II and Excelsior. He also played for HSV Hoek in 2010.

He has also been capped one time in the UEFA Champions League group stage. On 26 October 1999, against Spartak Moscow, Van Nieuwstadt made his UEFA Champions League debut with Willem II.
