= Sean O'Driscoll =

Ireland international footballer & manager (b.1957)

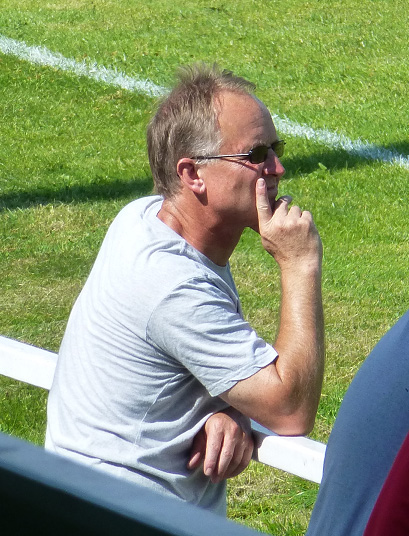
- O'Driscoll watching AFC Wulfrunians in 2014

Personal information
- Full name: Sean Michael O'Driscoll
- Date of birth: 1 July 1957 (age 69)
- Place of birth: Wolverhampton, England
- Height: 5 ft 8 in (1.73 m)
- Position: Midfielder

Senior career*
Years	Team	Apps	(Gls)
1977–1978	Willenhall Town	33	(6)
1978–1979	Alvechurch		
1979–1984	Fulham	148	(13)
1984–1995	AFC Bournemouth	423	(19)
Total		604	(36)

International career
1982–1983	Republic of Ireland	3	(0)
1983	Republic of Ireland U21	3	(0)

Managerial career
- 2000–2006: AFC Bournemouth
- 2006–2011: Doncaster Rovers
- 2012: Crawley Town
- 2012: Nottingham Forest
- 2013: Bristol City
- 2014–2015: England U19
- 2015–2016: Walsall
- * Club domestic league appearances and goals

Sean Michael O'Driscoll (born 1 July 1957) is a former professional footballer and manager. He has previously managed AFC Bournemouth, Doncaster Rovers, Crawley Town, Nottingham Forest, Bristol City and Walsall. He was known by the nickname "Noisy" in his playing days at Fulham. He represented the Republic of Ireland as a player.

== Playing career ==
As a player, O'Driscoll was a midfielder for Fulham (1979–84) and AFC Bournemouth (1984–95). He also won three caps for the Republic of Ireland. He played as Bournemouth won the inaugural Associate Members' Cup by beating Hull City in the final. When he retired in 1995, he had played a club-record 423 league games for Bournemouth (his record has since been broken by Neil Young and Steve Fletcher), and subsequently joined the club's coaching staff.

== Management career ==
=== AFC Bournemouth ===
In August 2000, he was appointed manager at Bournemouth, and despite limited financial resources, achieved good results, including promotion via the Third Division play-offs in the 2002–03 season.

=== Doncaster Rovers ===
O'Driscoll left Bournemouth in September 2006 to become manager of Doncaster Rovers during the season the club moved from Belle Vue to Keepmoat. Notable events early in his career with Doncaster include a 4–0 victory away at Brentford, winning the manager of the month award for January 2007, and also overseeing Rovers' 3–2 success over Bristol Rovers in the Football League Trophy final in 2007. This success meant that O'Driscoll had achieved the rare feat of managing two different teams to victory at the Millennium Stadium.

In O'Driscoll's first full season in charge, 2007–08, he steered Doncaster to promotion into the Championship after a 1–0 victory over Leeds United in the League One play-off final at Wembley Stadium. The following season, 2008–09, saw his side meet his demands of avoiding relegation when they finished 14th in the table.

For the following season and a half, O'Driscoll turned Doncaster into a comfortable mid-table team on one of the tightest budgets in the Championship. However, a plethora of injuries in the second half of the 2010–11 season (which at one point even saw the club request to postpone a match with Norwich City because they were struggling to field a first team) saw Doncaster go on a dreadful run of form winning just one of their final 19 matches of the season, though they still survived due to their good form over the first half of the season.

O'Driscoll could not inspire a revival during the start of the following season and on 23 September 2011, with Doncaster taking just a single point from their first seven games, it was confirmed that O'Driscoll, along with his assistant Richard O'Kelly, had been relieved of their duties by Doncaster Rovers.

He became a coach at Nottingham Forest under Steve Cotterill in the 2011-2012 Championship season. He left the club to join Crawley as manager in the summer of 2012.

=== Crawley Town ===
O'Driscoll was appointed Crawley Town manager in May 2012. In July 2012, he left the club without managing a competitive game to take over at Nottingham Forest.

=== Nottingham Forest ===
On 19 July 2012 O'Driscoll was appointed as manager of Nottingham Forest by the club's owners, the Al Hasawi family. By 31 August 2012 he had signed eleven new players, including fan favourite Adlène Guedioura. He also linked up once again with former Doncaster players Simon Gillett, James Coppinger and Billy Sharp.

After five months in charge of the club, O'Driscoll was sacked on 26 December 2012 despite a 4–2 victory over Leeds United. This was the second time he had left Nottingham Forest in 2012, having previously been a coach during the 2011–2012 season. Forest owner Fawaz Al-Hasawi had received advice from the Hull City board that a manager with Premier League experience was needed to secure promotion, which lead Al-Hasawi to make the decision. He originally planned to sack O'Driscoll on Christmas Day, but Forest Chief Executive Mark Arthur refused to follow the order until the following day.

=== Bristol City ===
O'Driscoll was announced as Bristol City manager on a twelve-month rolling contract on 14 January 2013. The club were bottom of the Championship at the time of his appointment. O'Driscoll's first match in charge of Bristol City came on 19 January 2013 with a 1–0 defeat against Leeds United at Elland Road. He earned his first win as Bristol City manager on 26 January with a 2–1 victory against Ipswich Town at Ashton Gate. This sparked an initial upturn in City's fortunes, with five wins and two draws from their next ten games taking them on the verge of climbing out of the relegation zone. However, seven defeats from their last nine games saw City relegated to League One with three games remaining and ultimately finishing bottom of the table.

O'Driscoll left Bristol City on 28 November 2013.

=== England U19s ===
On 3 September 2014 the FA announced that O'Driscoll would replace the outgoing Noel Blake in the post of England U19 manager. On 6 July 2015 it was confirmed that O'Driscoll had left the position in order to take over as assistant manager at Liverpool

=== Liverpool (assistant) ===
On 6 July 2015 it was announced by Liverpool that O'Driscoll had been appointed assistant manager, replacing Colin Pascoe for the 2015–16 Premier League season.

He left the position in October 2015 after the sacking of Brendan Rodgers.

=== Walsall ===
On 18 December 2015, O'Driscoll was announced as head coach of Walsall. O'Driscoll's first match in charge of Walsall ended in a 2–0 victory over Port Vale. On 6 March 2016, O'Driscoll was sacked by Walsall.

=== Wolverhampton Wanderers ===
On 10 July 2017, O'Driscoll was announced as a professional phase coach in Wolves Academy.

=== Portsmouth ===
On 22 March 2019, O'Driscoll was appointed as head of coaching and learning for Portsmouth's academy. O'Driscoll formally resigned from this role on 29 September 2021.

=== Weymouth ===
On 14 December 2021, O'Driscoll joined the backroom team at National League side Weymouth on a non-contract basis.

== Honours ==
=== As a player ===
Bournemouth

- Football League Third Division: 1986–87
- Associate Members' Cup: 1983–84

=== As a manager ===
Bournemouth

- Football League Third Division play-offs: 2003

Doncaster Rovers

- Football League One play-offs: 2008
- Football League Trophy: 2006–07

Individual

- Football League One Manager of the Month: January 2007

== See also ==
- List of Republic of Ireland international footballers born outside the Republic of Ireland
