= 1999–2000 AFC Bournemouth season =

Bournemouth
1999–2000 season
- Manager: Mel Machin
- Football League Second Division: 16th
- FA Cup: Second round
- League Cup: Third round
- Football League Trophy: Quarter final
- Top goalscorer: Mark Stein (15)
Home colours

During the 1999–2000 English football season, AFC Bournemouth competed in the Football League Second Division, where they finished in 16th position on 57 points.

== Final league table ==
Pos	Team	Pld	W	D	L	GF	GA	GD	Pts
14	Oldham Athletic	46	16	12	18	50	55	−5	60
15	Bury	46	13	18	15	61	64	−3	57
16	Bournemouth	46	16	9	21	59	62	−3	57
17	Brentford	46	13	13	20	47	61	−14	52
18	Colchester United	46	14	10	22	59	82	−23	52

Rules for classification: 1) Points; 2) Goal difference; 3) Goals scored

== Results ==
Bournemouth's score comes first

=== Legend ===
Win	Draw	Loss

=== Football League Division Two ===
Match	Date	Opponent	Venue	Result	Attendance	Scorers
1	7 August 1999	Cambridge United	H	2–1	5,552	Mean 51', Howe 55'
2	14 August 1999	Bristol City	A	1–3	9,758	O'Neill 77'
3	21 August 1999	Colchester United	H	4–0	4,508	Stein 15', Jørgensen 58', S Fletcher 80', 89'
4	28 August 1999	Scunthorpe United	A	1–3	3,376	Stein 18'
5	31 August 1999	Luton Town	H	1–0	4,797	S Fletcher 73'
6	3 September 1999	Burnley	A	1–2	10,223	Stein 39'
7	11 September 1999	Reading	H	3–1	6,007	Grant 22' (o.g.), Hughes 31', Casper 43' (o.g.)
8	18 September 1999	Blackpool	A	0–0	4,471	
9	25 September 1999	Bury	H	1–1	4,208	Stein 82'
10	2 October 1999	Chesterfield	A	1–0	2,775	Jørgensen 25'
11	16 October 1999	Stoke City	A	1–1	5,990	Robinson 24'
12	19 October 1999	Bristol Rovers	H	0–1	5,613	
13	23 October 1999	Bury	A	2–2	3,701	Warren 38', Robinson 52'
14	3 November 1999	Preston North End	A	0–3	9,630	
15	3 November 1999	Cardiff City	H	1–0	4,471	Stein 64'
16	12 November 1999	Gillingham	A	1–4	6,336	Robinson 4'
17	16 November 1999	Wigan Athletic	A	1–3	4,338	S Fletcher 59'
18	23 November 1999	Brentford	H	4–1	4,202	Warren 32', Jørgensen 42', Stein 54', 74'
19	27 November 1999	Millwall	H	1–2	5,121	C Fletcher 56'
20	4 December 1999	Cambridge United	A	2–0	3,579	Robinson 36' (pen), Day 75'
21	11 December 1999	Notts County	A	1–5	4,199	O'Neill 86'
22	18 December 1999	Oxford United	H	4–0	4,443	S Fletcher 18', Robinson 38' (pen), Jørgensen 48', Hayter 89'
23	26 December 1999	Wycombe Wanderers	A	1–2	5,656	Hayter 42'
24	28 December 1999	Wrexham	H	1–0	5,394	Stein 44'
25	3 January 2000	Oldham Athletic	A	0–1	5,160	
26	8 January 2000	Notts County	H	1–1	4,344	Stein 47'
27	15 January 2000	Bristol City	H	2–3	5,425	Robinson 48', O'Neill 84'
28	22 January 2000	Colchester United	A	1–3	3,767	Robinson 35'
29	29 January 2000	Scunthorpe United	H	1–1	4,802	Stein 64'
30	5 February 2000	Luton Town	H	2–1	5,961	Mean 34', Watts 46' (o.g.)
31	12 February 2000	Burnley	H	0–1	5,804	
32	19 February 2000	Millwall	A	1–3	8,463	O'Shea 3'
33	26 February 2000	Blackpool	H	2–0	4,464	Mean 3', Robinson 80' (pen)
34	4 March 2000	Reading	A	0–2	10,551	
35	7 March 2000	Cardiff City	A	2–1	4,389	Stein 65', Hughes 89'
36	11 March 2000	Preston North End	H	0–1	5,317	
37	18 March 2000	Brentford	A	2–0	4,578	Jørgensen 26', Robinson 88' (pen)
38	21 March 2000	Gillingham	A	0–1	4,443	
39	25 March 2000	Wycombe Wanderers	H	2–0	4,393	Elliott 50', Mean 81'
40	1 April 2000	Oxford United	A	0–1	5,124	
41	8 April 2000	Oldham Athletic	H	3–0	3,808	Sheerin 47', S Fletcher 71', Elliott 89'
42	15 April 2000	Wrexham	A	0–1	2,597	
43	22 April 2000	Stoke City	A	0–1	15,022	
44	25 April 2000	Chesterfield	H	1–1	3,481	C Fletcher 78'
45	29 April 2000	Bristol Rovers	A	2–2	8,847	C Fletcher 45', S Fletcher 52'
46	6 May 2000	Wigan Athletic	H	2–2	6,512	Elliott 26', Jørgensen 44'

=== League Cup ===
Round	Date	Opponent	Venue	Result	Attendance	Scorers
R1 1st Leg	10 August 1999	Barnet	H	2–0	3,281	Hayter 6', Huck 72'
R1 2nd Leg	24 August 1999	Barnet	A	2–3	1,697	Stein 12', 21'
R2 1st Leg	14 September 1999	Charlton Athletic	A	0–0	10,346	
R2 2nd Leg	21 September 1999	Charlton Athletic	H	0–0 (3–1 pens)	4,369	
R3	13 October 1999	West Ham United	A	0–2	22,067	

=== FA Cup ===
Round	Date	Opponent	Venue	Result	Attendance	Scorers
R1	30 October 1999	Notts County	A	1–1	3,674	Warren 53'
R1 Replay	30 October 1999	Notts County	H	4–2	4,026	S Fletcher 44', 67', Robinson 89' (pen), Stein 90'
R2	20 November 1999	Bristol City	H	0–2	5,223	

=== Football League Trophy ===
Round	Date	Opponent	Venue	Result	Attendance	Scorers
R2	11 January 1999	Brighton & Hove Albion	H	1–0 AET	4,325	Hayter 102'
Quarter Final	11 January 1999	Bristol City	A	1–1 (1–4 pens)	4,291	Stein 35'

== Squad ==
Appearances for competitive matches only

Pos.	Name	League		FA Cup		League Cup		Football League Trophy		Total	
Pos.	Name	Apps	Goals	Apps	Goals	Apps	Goals	Apps	Goals	Apps	Goals
MF	(England) John Bailey	0(1)	0	0	0	0(1)	0	0	0	0(2)	0
MF	(Seychelles) Kevin Betsy	1(4)	0	0	0	0	0	0	0	1(4)	0
DF	(England) Karl Broadhurst	16	0	1	0	3	0	1	0	21	0
DF	(Trinidad and Tobago) Ian Cox	28	0	3	0	5	0	1	0	37	0
MF	(England) Jamie Day	9(2)	1	2	0	1(1)	0	1	0	13(3)	1
DF	(England) Stuart Elliott	6(2)	0	0	0	0	0	0	0	6(2)	0
MF	(England) Wade Elliott	6(6)	3	0	0	0	0	0	0	6(6)	3
DF	(England) Nick Fenton	8	0	0	0	0	0	0	0	8	0
MF	(Wales) Carl Fletcher	20(5)	3	3	0	0	0	1	0	24(3)	3
FW	(England) Steve Fletcher	35(1)	7	3	2	5	0	0	0	42(1)	7
DF	(England) Terrell Forbes	3	0	0	0	0	0	0	0	3	0
MF	(England) James Ford	0(2)	0	0	0	0	0	0	0	0(2)	0
FW	(England) James Hayter	21(10)	2	1	0	1(1)	1	2	1	25(11)	4
DF	(England) Eddie Howe	28	1	0	0	5	0	0	0	33	1
MF	(France) Willie Huck	4(13)	0	0	0	0(3)	1	0	0	4(16)	1
MF	(Scotland) Richard Hughes	20(1)	2	0	0	2(1)	0	1	0	23(2)	2
MF	(Faroe Islands) Claus Jørgensen	34(10)	6	3	0	4	0	1(1)	0	42(11)	6
MF	(England) Justin Keeler	0(3)	0	0	0	0	0	0(1)	0	0(4)	0
FW	(England) Steve Lovell	0(1)	0	0	0	0	0	0	0	0(1)	0
MF	(England) Scott Mean	26(6)	4	0(1)	0	5	0	2	0	33(7)	4
MF	(Scotland) John O'Neill	18(12)	3	0	0	0(2)	0	1	0	19(14)	3
DF	(Republic of Ireland) John O'Shea	10	1	0	0	0	0	1	0	10	1
GK	(England) Mark Ovendale	43	0	3	0	5	0	2	0	53	0
MF	(England) Mark Rawlinson	2(1)	0	0	0	1	0	1	0	4(1)	0
MF	(Northern Ireland) Steve Robinson	40	9	3	1	4	0	2	0	49	10
FW	(England) Joe Sheerin	3(3)	1	0	0	0	0	0	0	6	1
DF	(England) Daniel Smith	0(1)	0	0	0	0	0	0	0	0(1)	0
FW	(South Africa) Mark Stein	36	11	3	1	5	2	2	1	46	15
GK	(England) Gareth Stewart	3	0	0	0	0	0	0	0	3	0
MF	(Wales) Brian Stock	4(1)	0	0	0	0	0	0	0	4(1)	0
DF	(England) Jason Tindall	4(4)	0	0	0	0	0	1	0	5(4)	0
MF	(England) Christer Warren	39(2)	2	3	1	4	0	1	0	47(2)	3
FW	(England) Gordon Watson	2(6)	0	1(2)	0	0(1)	0	0(1)	0	3(10)	0
DF	(England) Neil Young	37	0	3	0	5	0	1	0	46	0

== See also ==
- 1999–2000 in English football
