= 2001–02 AFC Bournemouth season =

Bournemouth
2001–02 season
- Manager: Sean O'Driscoll
- Grounds: Avenue Stadium/Dean Court
- Second Division: 21st (Relegated)
- FA Cup: Second Round
- Football League Cup: First Round
- Football League Trophy: First Round
- Top goalscorer: League: Warren Feeney (13); All: Warren Feeney (13)

The 2001–02 AFC Bournemouth season saw the club relegated from the English Second Division. During the 2001–02 English football season, Bournemouth participated in Division Two, the LDV Vans Trophy, the FA Cup, and the Football League Cup. Bournemouth finished 21st in Division Two and were subsequently relegated to Division Three. They reached the Second Round of the FA Cup, but were knocked of the League Cup and the LDV Vans Trophy at the first hurdle.

2001 also marked the opening of a new look Dean Court, known for sponsorship reasons as 'The Fitness First Stadium', but the first 8 games of the season were held at Dorchester Town's Avenue Stadium while building work was being completed. The first game at The Fitness First Stadium was against Wrexham with the Cherries winning 3–0.

== Season squad ==
Note: Flags indicate national team as defined under FIFA eligibility rules; some limited exceptions apply. Players may hold more than one non-FIFA nationality.

No.	Pos.	Nation	Player
1	GK	ENG	Gareth Stewart
2	DF	ENG	Neil Young
3	DF	ENG	Stephen Purches
5	FW	NIR	Warren Feeney
6	DF	IRL	Shaun Maher
7	DF	WAL	Carl Fletcher
8	MF	SCO	Peter Grant
9	FW	ENG	Chukki Eribenne
10	FW	ENG	Steve Fletcher
11	MF	SCO	Richard Hughes
12	MF	IRL	Garreth O'Connor
13	GK	FRA	Mickaël Ménétrier
14	FW	ENG	James Hayter
15	DF	ENG	Narada Bernard
16	MF	ENG	Wade Elliott

No.	Pos.	Nation	Player
17	MF	FRA	Willie Huck
18	DF	ENG	Jason Tindall
19	DF	FRA	Pascal Tetu
20	FW	ENG	Amos Foyewa
21	DF	ENG	Karl Broadhurst
22	MF	WAL	Brian Stock
23	DF	ENG	David Birmingham
24	MF	ENG	James Ford
25	DF	ENG	Danny Smith
26	FW	SCO	Derek Holmes
27	DF	SCO	Graeme Mathie
28	DF	ENG	Kieran McAnespie (on loan from Fulham)
30	FW	COD	Trésor Kandol
32	GK	AUS	Dimitris Brinias
33	MF	ENG	Danny Thomas
34	GK	ENG	James Bittner

=== Left club during season ===
Note: Flags indicate national team as defined under FIFA eligibility rules; some limited exceptions apply. Players may hold more than one non-FIFA nationality.

No.	Pos.	Nation	Player
28	MF	ENG	John Melligan (on loan from Wolverhampton Wanderers)
31	GK	CAN	Simon Rayner (joined Barry Town in January 2002)
4	DF	ENG	Eddie Howe (joined Portsmouth) on 28 March 2002
31	MF	ENG	Stephen Cooke (on loan from Aston Villa)

== Final league table ==
Pos	Team	Pld	W	D	L	GF	GA	GD	Pts	Promotion or relegation
19	Notts County	46	13	11	22	59	71	−12	50	
20	Northampton Town	46	14	7	25	54	79	−25	49	
21	Bournemouth (R)	46	10	14	22	56	71	−15	44	Relegation to Football League Third Division
22	Bury (R)	46	11	11	24	43	75	−32	44	Relegation to Football League Third Division
23	Wrexham (R)	46	11	10	25	56	89	−33	43	Relegation to Football League Third Division

Rules for classification: In the Football League goals scored (GF) takes precedence over goal difference (GD).
(R) Relegated

== Competitions ==
=== Legend ===
Win	Draw	Loss

=== Results ===
Game	Date	Opponent	Venue	Result	Attendance	Goalscorers
1	11 August 2001	Huddersfield Town	McAlpine Stadium	0-1	10,137	
2	18 August 2001	Blackpool	Avenue Stadium	0-1	3,709	
3	25 August 2001	Cardiff City	Ninian Park	2-2	13,383	Feeney pen 62' Tindall 65'
4	1 September 2001	Cambridge United	Abbey Stadium	2-2	2,754	Elliott 20' 85'
5	8 September 2001	Swindon Town	Avenue Stadium	0-0	3,770	
6	15 September 2001	Bury	Avenue Stadium	3-2	3,004	Hayter 9' Feeney pen 22' Stock 90'
7	18 September 2001	Peterborough United	London Road	0-6	3,445	
8	22 September 2001	Brighton & Hove Albion	Withdean Stadium	1-2	6,714	Howe 76'
9	25 September 2001	Reading	Avenue Stadium	1-0	3,691	Hayter 71'
10	29 September 2001	Stoke City	Britannia Stadium	0-2	14,803	
11	5 October 2001	Oldham Athletic	Avenue Stadium	3-2	3,312	Hayter 57' Holmes 60' Elliott 65'
12	9 October 2001	Wigan Athletic	Avenue Stadium	2-0	2,908	Hayter 14' Elliott 90'
13	13 October 2001	Wycombe Wanderers	Adams Park	1-1	6,810	Holmes 21'
14	20 October 2001	Brentford	Avenue Stadium	0-2	3,934	
15	23 October 2001	Bristol City	Ashton Gate	0-1	9,972	
16	27 October 2001	Notts County	Avenue Stadium	4-2	3,209	Elliott pen 37' pen 45' C. Fletcher 41' Feeney 71'
17	3 November 2001	Colchester United	Layer Road	2-1	4,369	Feeney 13' Howe 20'
18	10 November 2001	Wrexham	Dean Court	3-0	5,031	Stock 29' Hayter 45' Tindall 64'
19	20 November 2001	Port Vale	Dean Court	0-0	4,428	
20	24 November 2001	Chesterfield	Saltergate	1-2	4,353	Feeney 27'
21	1 December 2001	Tranmere Rovers	Dean Court	0-2	6,035	
22	15 December 2001	Northampton Town	Sixfields	0-1	3,909	
23	22 December 2001	Queens Park Rangers	Dean Court	1-2	8,147	C. Fletcher 89'
24	26 December 2001	Swindon Town	County Ground	0-0	6,790	
25	29 December 2001	Wigan Athletic	JJB Stadium	0-0	5,011	
26	12 January 2002	Blackpool	Bloomfield Road	3-4	4,583	Hayter 8' C. Fletcher 45' 89'
27	19 January 2002	Huddersfield Town	Dean Court	2-3	5,307	Holmes 58' Feeney 90'
28	22 January 2002	Queens Park Rangers	Loftus Road	1-2	10,901	Feeney 50'
29	26 January 2002	Oldham Athletic	Boundary Park	3-3	4,853	Howe 53' Feeney pen 56' Hughes 66'
30	2 February 2002	Stoke City	Dean Court	3-1	6,027	Purches 6' Hughes 43' Feeney 56'
31	5 February 2002	Cardiff City	Dean Court	1-2	4,336	Holmes 73'
32	9 February 2002	Brentford	Griffin Park	0-1	6,698	
33	16 February 2002	Wycombe Wanderers	Dean Court	1-2	5,807	Howe 76'
34	23 February 2002	Bury	Gigg Lane	1-2	4,218	Holmes 14'
35	23 February 2002	Brighton & Hove Albion	Dean Court	1-1	6,337	Holmes 36'
36	2 March 2002	Peterborough United	Dean Court	0-2	5,163	
37	5 March 2002	Reading	Madejski Stadium	2-2	13,538	Hayter 48' Holmes 71'
38	9 March 2002	Northampton Town	Dean Court	5-1	6,322	Feeney 33' 74' Tindall 55' Holmes 65' Purches 90'
39	16 March 2002	Tranmere Rovers	Prenton Park	0-0	7,829	
40	19 March 2002	Cambridge United	Dean Court	2-2	7,082	Feeney 24' Elliott pen 49'
41	23 March 2002	Bristol City	Dean Court	1-3	7,033	McAnespie 90'
42	30 March 2002	Notts County	Meadow Lane	0-2	9,014	
43	2 April 2002	Colchester United	Dean Court	0-1	5,908	
44	6 April 2002	Port Vale	Vale Park	0-0	3,514	
45	13 April 2002	Chesterfield	Dean Court	3-1	6,068	Holmes 33' Feeney 54' Elliott pen 57'
46	20 April 2002	Wrexham	Racecourse Ground	1-2	4,289	C. Fletcher 7'

=== League Cup ===
Round	Date	Opponent	Venue	Result	Attendance	Goalscorers
1	21 August 2001	Torquay United	Avenue Stadium	0-2	2,556	

=== FA Cup ===
Round	Date	Opponent	Venue	Result	Attendance	Goalscorers
1	17 November 2001	Worksop Town	Dean Court	3-0	4,414	Hughes 14' Hayter 26' S. Fletcher 77'
2	8 December 2001	Peterborough United	London Road	0-1	4,773	

=== Football League Trophy ===
Round	Date	Opponent	Venue	Result	Attendance	Goalscorers
1	16 October 2001	Barnet	Underhill	1-2	789	Kandol 31'
