= 2000–01 AFC Bournemouth season =

Bournemouth
2000–01 season
- Football League Second Division: 7th
- FA Cup: Third round
- League Cup: First round
- League Trophy: Second round
- Top goalscorer: League: Jermain Defoe (18); All: Jermain Defoe (18)
Home colours

The 2000–01 season saw Bournemouth compete in the Football League Second Division where they finished in 7th position with 73 points.

== Final league table ==
Pos	Team	Pld	W	D	L	GF	GA	GD	Pts	Qualification or relegation
5	Stoke City	46	21	14	11	74	49	+25	77	Qualification for the Second Division play-offs
6	Wigan Athletic	46	19	18	9	53	42	+11	75	Qualification for the Second Division play-offs
7	Bournemouth	46	20	13	13	79	55	+24	73	
8	Notts County	46	19	12	15	62	66	−4	69	
9	Bristol City	46	18	14	14	70	56	+14	68	

Rules for classification: 1) Points; 2) Goal difference; 3) Goals scored

== Results ==
Bournemouth's score comes first

=== Legend ===
Win	Draw	Loss

=== Football League First Division ===
Match	Date	Opponent	Venue	Result	Attendance	Scorers
1	12 August 2000	Bristol Rovers	A	1–1	8,046	Eribenne
2	19 August 2000	Cambridge United	H	1–1	4,869	S Fletcher
3	26 August 2000	Luton Town	A	0–1	5,221	
4	2 September 2000	Colchester United	A	1–3	3,459	Jørgensen
5	9 September 2000	Port Vale	A	1–1	3,859	C Fletcher
6	12 September 2000	Swindon Town	H	3–0	3,673	S Fletcher (2), Hayter
7	16 September 2000	Walsall	A	1–1	5,054	Elliott
8	23 September 2000	Oldham Athletic	H	1–1	3,976	S Fletcher
9	26 September 2000	Wrexham	H	1–2	3,004	Jørgensen
10	30 September 2000	Brentford	A	2–3	4,210	Jørgensen, Hughes
11	6 October 2000	Bristol City	A	3–3	8,936	Jørgensen, C Fletcher, O'Connor
12	14 October 2000	Rotherham United	H	0–1	3,878	
13	17 October 2000	Wigan Athletic	H	0–0	3,035	
14	21 October 2000	Bury	A	5–2	2,892	Jørgensen, Hayter (4)
15	24 October 2000	Notts County	H	0–1	3,556	
16	28 October 2000	Stoke City	A	1–2	11,572	Defoe
17	4 November 2000	Peterborough United	H	2–1	3,936	Defoe, Cummings
18	11 November 2000	Northampton Town	H	3–0	5,692	Defoe (2), S Fletcher
19	2 December 2000	Wycombe Wanderers	A	3–0	5,185	Defoe, C Fletcher (2)
20	16 December 2000	Swansea City	H	2–0	3,738	Defoe, Hughes
21	23 December 2000	Millwall	H	1–2	6,843	Defoe
22	26 December 2000	Oxford United	A	2–1	6,200	Defoe (2)
23	1 January 2001	Luton Town	H	3–2	5,411	Defoe, Hughes, S Fletcher
24	13 January 2001	Wrexham	A	2–2	2,835	Defoe, Hayter
25	23 January 2001	Cambridge United	A	2–0	3,027	Defoe, Hayter
26	27 January 2001	Millwall	A	1–0	12,713	Jørgensen
27	3 February 2001	Colchester United	H	2–2	4,407	Hughes, C Fletcher
28	10 February 2001	Port Vale	A	1–2	3,956	Tindall
29	17 February 2001	Walsall	H	2–2	4,564	Defoe, Howe
30	20 February 2001	Swindon Town	A	1–1	5,948	Hughes
31	24 February 2001	Oldham Athletic	A	1–2	4,845	Hayter
32	27 February 2001	Bristol Rovers	H	1–2	3,466	Jørgensen
33	3 March 2001	Brentford	H	2–0	4,438	S Fletcher, Elliott
34	6 March 2001	Rotherham United	A	1–3	6,488	Hayter
35	10 March 2001	Bristol City	H	4–0	4,028	Elliott (2), C Fletcher, Hughes
36	17 March 2001	Wigan Athletic	A	1–1	5,878	Howe
37	24 March 2001	Bury	H	1–0	3,325	Defoe
38	31 March 2001	Swansea City	A	3–0	4,013	Elliott, Hayter, Feeney
39	6 April 2001	Oxford United	H	4–3	3,747	Hayter, Hughes (2), Feeney
40	10 April 2001	Reading	H	1–2	6,603	Defoe
41	14 April 2001	Notts County	A	2–0	5,186	S Fletcher (2)
42	17 April 2001	Stoke City	H	1–0	5,373	Defoe
43	21 April 2001	Peterborough United	A	2–1	6,318	Defoe, Feeney
44	23 April 2001	Wycombe Wanderers	H	2–0	5,026	Elliott, Feeney
45	28 April 2001	Northampton Town	H	2–0	6,511	Elliott, Jørgensen
46	5 May 2001	Reading	A	3–3	20,589	Elliott (2), Defoe

=== FA Cup ===
Match	Date	Opponent	Venue	Result	Attendance	Scorers
R1	18 November 2000	Swansea City	H	2–0	3,422	Elliott, Hayter
R2	9 December 2000	Nuneaton Borough	H	3–0	5,835	Elliott, Hughes, O'Connor
R3	6 January 2001	Gillingham	H	2–3	7,403	Defoe, C Fletcher

=== Football League Cup ===
Match	Date	Opponent	Venue	Result	Attendance	Scorers
R1 1st leg	22 August 2000	Norwich City	A	0–0	12,224	
R1 2nd leg	5 September 2000	Norwich City	H	1–2	3,634	Jørgensen

=== Football League Trophy ===
Match	Date	Opponent	Venue	Result	Attendance	Scorers
R1	5 December 2000	Dover Athletic	H	1–1 (4–2 pens)	2,171	Huck
R2	9 January 2001	Swansea City	H	0–1	3,810	

== Squad statistics ==
No.	Pos.	Name	League		FA Cup		League Cup		Other		Total	
No.	Pos.	Name	Apps	Goals	Apps	Goals	Apps	Goals	Apps	Goals	Apps	Goals
1	GK	(France) Mickaël Ménétrier	11(1)	0	0	0	2	0	2	0	15(1)	0
2	DF	(England) Neil Young	7	0	0	0	2	0	0	0	9	0
3	DF	(England) Stephen Purches	25(9)	0	2	0	2	0	0	0	29(9)	0
4	DF	(England) Eddie Howe	30(1)	2	3	0	0	0	1	0	34(1)	2
5	FW	(Northern Ireland) Warren Feeney	3(7)	4	0	0	0	0	0	0	3(7)	4
7	MF	(Wales) Carl Fletcher	43	6	2	1	2	0	0(1)	0	47(1)	7
8	MF	(Scotland) Peter Grant	14(1)	0	0	0	2	0	1	0	17(1)	0
9	FW	(England) Chukki Eribenne	6(11)	1	0(3)	0	2	0	2	0	10(14)	1
10	FW	(England) Steve Fletcher	45	9	3	0	2	0	1	0	51	9
11	DF	(Scotland) Richard Hughes	44	8	2	1	2	0	1	0	50	9
12	DF	(Republic of Ireland) Garreth O'Connor	1(21)	1	0(3)	1	0	0	2	0	4(24)	1
13	GK	(England) Gareth Stewart	35	0	3	0	0	0	0	0	38	0
14	FW	(England) James Hayter	29(11)	11	3	1	0(1)	0	0(1)	0	32(13)	12
15	DF	(England) Narada Bernard	6(8)	0	1	0	0	0	2	0	9(8)	0
16	MF	(England) Wade Elliott	27(9)	9	3	2	0(1)	0	0(1)	0	30(11)	9
17	MF	(France) Willie Huck	1(7)	0	0	0	0(2)	0	2	1	3(9)	1
18	DF	(England) Jason Tindall	44(1)	1	3	0	2	0	1	0	50(1)	1
19	MF	(Faroe Islands) Claus Bech Jørgensen	43	8	3	0	2	1	0	0	48	9
20	MF	(England) Jamie Day	6(1)	0	2(1)	0	0	0	1	0	9(2)	0
21	DF	(England) Karl Broadhurst	25(5)	0	2	0	0	0	0	27(5)	0	0
22	MF	(Wales) Brian Stock	0(1)	0	0	0	0	0	1(1)	0	1(2)	0
24	MF	(England) James Ford	0(3)	0	0	0	0	0	0	0	0(3)	0
25	DF	(England) Daniel Smith	7(7)	0	0(1)	0	2	0	2	0	11(8)	0
27	DF	(England) Stevland Angus	7(2)	0	0	0	0	0	0	0	7(2)	0
27	FW	(England) Jermain Defoe	27(2)	18	1	1	0	0	1	0	29(2)	19
28	DF	(England) Warren Cummings	10	1	0	0	0	0	1	0	11	1
28	DF	(England) Nick Fenton	4(1)	0	0	0	0	0	0	0	4(1)	0
29	DF	(England) David Woozley	6	0	0	0	0	0	0	0	6	0
31	MF	(Scotland) John O'Neill	0(3)	0	0	0	0	0	0	0	0(3)	0
32	MF	(England) Justin Keeler	0(1)	0	0	0	0	0	0(2)	0	0(3)	0
