= 1998–99 AFC Bournemouth season =

Bournemouth
1998–99 season
- Manager: Mel Machin
- Grounds: Dean Court
- Second Division: 7th
- FA Cup: Fourth round
- Football League Cup: Third round
- Football League Trophy: Quarter-final (Southern Section)

The 1998–99 AFC Bournemouth season saw the club participate in Second Division, the Auto Windscreens Shield, the FA Cup, and the Football League Cup. Bournemouth finished 7th in Division Two. They reached the Fourth Round of the FA Cup, the Third Round of the League Cup and reached the Quarter Finals of the Auto Windscreens Shield.

== Season squad ==
Note: Flags indicate national team as defined under FIFA eligibility rules; some limited exceptions apply. Players may hold more than one non-FIFA nationality.

No.	Pos.	Nation	Player
—	GK	ENG	Mark Ovendale
—	GK	IRL	Nick Colgan
—	DF	ENG	Neil Young
—	DF	ENG	Jamie Vincent
—	DF	ENG	Eddie Howe
—	DF	ENG	Karl Broadhurst
—	DF	WAL	Carl Fletcher
—	DF	ENG	Ian Cox
—	DF	GUI	Mohamed Berthé
—	DF	ENG	Jason Tindall
—	DF	ENG	Anthony Griffin
—	DF	ENG	Jamie Jenkins
—	MF	ENG	Jamie Day
—	MF	SCO	John O'Neill

No.	Pos.	Nation	Player
—	MF	ENG	John Bailey
—	MF	SCO	Richard Hughes
—	MF	NIR	Steve Robinson
—	MF	ENG	Michael Dean
—	MF	FRA	Willie Huck
—	MF	ENG	Christer Warren
—	MF	ENG	Mark Rawlinson
—	MF	ENG	Stuart Wardley
—	FW	ENG	Steve Fletcher
—	FW	ENG	James Hayter
—	FW	RSA	Mark Stein
—	FW	ENG	David Town
—	FW	CIV	Roger Boli

== Final league table ==
Pos	Team	Pld	W	D	L	GF	GA	GD	Pts	Qualification or relegation
5	Preston North End	46	22	13	11	78	50	+28	79	Qualification for the Second Division play-offs
6	Wigan Athletic	46	22	10	14	75	48	+27	76	Qualification for the Second Division play-offs
7	Bournemouth	46	21	13	12	63	41	+22	76	
8	Stoke City	46	21	6	19	59	63	−4	69	
9	Chesterfield	46	17	13	16	46	44	+2	64	

Rules for classification: 1) Points; 2) Goals scored; 3) Goal difference

== Competitions ==
=== Legend ===
Win	Draw	Loss

=== Results ===
Game	Date	Opponent	Venue	Result	Attendance	Goalscorers
1	8 August 1998	Lincoln City	Dean Court	2–0	5,573	Cox 11' Stein 29'
2	15 August 1998	Notts County	Meadow Lane	2–1	5,269	Berthe 51' Robinson 63'
3	22 August 1998	Millwall	Dean Court	3–0	6,956	Cox 56' O'Neill 89' Tindall pen 89'
4	29 August 1998	Fulham	Craven Cottage	0–0	12,107	
5	1 September 1998	Blackpool	Dean Court	1–1	6,785	Stein 50'
6	5 September 1998	Stoke City	Britannia Stadium	0–2	13,443	
7	8 September 1998	Manchester City	Maine Road	1–2	26,696	Fletcher 48'
8	12 September 1998	Wigan Athletic	Dean Court	1–0	5,151	Berthe 83'
9	19 September 1998	Wycombe Wanderers	Adams Park	2–0	4,267	Fletcher 25' O'Neill 31'
10	26 September 1998	Oldham Athletic	Dean Court	2–0	5,877	Robinson 6' Stein 49'
11	3 October 1998	Bristol Rovers	Memorial Stadium	0–1	7,526	
12	10 October 1998	Macclesfield Town	Moss Rose	2–2	2,974	Robinson pen 45' Stein 89'
13	17 October 1998	Northampton Town	Dean Court	1–1	6,362	Stein 26'
14	20 October 1998	Gillingham	Dean Court	3-3	5,183	Young 44' Hughes 57' Stein 88'
15	7 November 1998	Reading	Madejski Stadium	3–3	13,004	Warren 40' Stein pen 51' 89'
16	10 November 1998	Chesterfield	Saltergate	1–3	3,797	Curtis O.G. 32
17	21 November 1998	Burnley	Dean Court	5–0	5,907	Warren 55' Robinson pen 60' 69 Stein 74' 89'
18	28 November 1998	Walsall	Bescot Stadium	0–1	3,895	
19	12 December 1998	York City	Dean Court	2–1	4,863	Robinson 63' Fletcher 74'
20	19 December 1998	Wrexham	Racecourse Ground	1–0	2,716	Fletcher 21'
21	26 December 1998	Millwall	The New Den	2–1	7,807	Warren 28' Stein 81'
22	28 December 1998	Luton Town	Dean Court	1–0	8,863	Cox 53'
23	9 January 1999	Lincoln City	Sincil Bank	1–2	3,141	Fletcher 33'
24	16 January 1999	Notts County	Dean Court	2–0	5,968	Stein 22' Cox 56'
25	26 January 1999	Preston North End	Dean Court	3–1	6,170	O'Neill 26' Howe 54' Stein 64'
26	30 January 1999	Luton Town	Kenilworth Road	2–2	5,426	Robinson 62' Vincent 69'
27	6 February 1999	Stoke City	Dean Court	4–0	7,637	Fletcher 21' 39' Robinson 71' Hayter 76'
28	13 February 1999	Manchester City	Dean Court	0–0	10,964	
29	20 February 1999	Wigan Athletic	Springfield Park	1–2	4,144	Robinson 90'
30	27 February 1999	Wycombe Wanderers	Dean Court	2–0	6,693	Robinson 24' 34'
31	2 March 1999	Fulham	Dean Court	1–1	9,928	Vincent 72'
32	6 March 1999	Oldham Athletic	Boundary Park	3–2	4,453	Cox 2' Stein 44' Warren 63'
33	9 March 1999	Bristol Rovers	Dean Court	1–0	7,181	Howe 66'
34	13 March 1999	Reading	Dean Court	0–1	9,445	
35	16 March 1999	Blackpool	Bloomfield Road	0–0	3,186	
36	20 March 1999	Preston North End	Deepdale	1–0	12,882	Fletcher 13'
37	27 March 1999	Colchester United	Dean Court	2–1	6,447	Warren 35' Hughes 40'
38	2 April 1999	Northampton Town	Sixfields	1–2	6,858	Robinson 17'
39	6 April 1999	Macclesfield Town	Dean Court	1–0	8,033	Stein 84'
40	9 April 1999	Gillingham	Priestfield	1–2	7,813	Robinson 18'
41	13 April 1999	Walsall	Dean Court	0–1	8,390	
42	13 April 1999	Burnley	Turf Moor	0–0	9,802	
43	24 April 1999	Chesterfield	Dean Court	0–0	6,890	
44	27 April 1999	Colchester United	Layer Road	1–2	4,168	Greene O.G. 34'
45	1 May 1999	York City	Bootham Crescent	1–0	3,503	Hayter 47'
46	8 May 1999	Wrexham	Dean Court	0–0	8,439	

=== League Cup ===
Round	Date	Opponent	Venue	Result	Attendance	Goalscorers	Notes
1R L1	11 August 1998	Colchester United	Dean Court	2–0	3,745	Robinson 15' Howe 88'	
1R L2	18 August 1998	Colchester United	Layer Road	2–3	2,550	Stein 23' Fletcher 28'	Bournemouth won 4–3 on aggregate
2R L1	15 September 1998	Wolverhampton Wanderers	Dean Court	1–1	7,096	Stein 17'	
2R L2	22 September 1998	Wolverhampton Wanderers	Molineux	2–1	15,431	Stein 21' 60'	Bournemouth won 3–2 on aggregate
3R	27 October 1998	Barnsley	Oakwell	1–2	8,560	Stein 87'	

=== FA Cup ===
Round	Date	Opponent	Venue	Result	Attendance	Goalscorers
1	14 November 1998	Basingstoke Town	The Camrose	2–1	3,830	O'Neill 37' Stein 66'
2	5 December 1998	Torquay United	Plainmoor	1–0	2,929	Robinson 22'
3	2 January 1999	West Bromwich Albion	Dean Court	1–0	10,881	Howe 34'
4	23 January 1999	Barnsley	Oakwell	1–3	11,982	Howe 51'

=== Football League Trophy ===
Round	Date	Opponent	Venue	Result	Attendance	Goalscorers
1	8 December 1998	Reading	Dean Court	2–0	2,666	Fletcher 9' Cox 76'
2	5 January 1999	Peterborough United	Dean Court	5–1	3,398	Fletcher 20' Stein 24' 28' 49' Robinson 68'
SQF	2 February 1999	Millwall	Dean Court	1–1 (3–4 p)	5,339	Stein 5'
