= 2010–11 AFC Bournemouth season =

Bournemouth
2010–11 season
- Chairman: Eddie Mitchell
- Manager: Eddie Howe (until 16 January 2011); Lee Bradbury
- Ground: Dean Court
- League One: 6th
- FA Cup: Second round
- Football League Cup: First round
- Football League Trophy: First round
- Top goalscorer: League: Marc Pugh (12); All: Marc Pugh (12)
Home colours	Away colours	Third colours

The 2010–11 AFC Bournemouth season was the club's first edition return to Football League One after a two-year hiatus. During the 2010–11 English football season, Bournemouth contested in League One, the Johnstones Paint Trophy, the FA Cup, and the Football League Cup. Bournemouth were eliminated from the League Cup and the Johnstones Paint Trophy in the First Round and the FA Cup in the Second Round.

== Season squad ==
Note: Flags indicate national team as defined under FIFA eligibility rules; some limited exceptions apply. Players may hold more than one non-FIFA nationality.

No.	Pos.	Nation	Player
1	GK	EGY	Shwan Jalal
3	DF	ENG	Ryan Garry
4	DF	ENG	Shaun Cooper
5	DF	ENG	Jason Pearce
6	MF	ENG	Marvin Bartley (Note: Player sold to Burnley on 31 January.)
7	MF	ENG	Marc Pugh
8	MF	ENG	Anton Robinson
9	FW	Jersey	Brett Pitman (Note: Player sold to Bristol City on 23 August.)
10	FW	ENG	Steve Lovell
11	MF	ENG	Liam Feeney
14	FW	ENG	Lyle Taylor
15	DF	ENG	Adam Smith (On loan from Tottenham Hotspur)
16	DF	WAL	Rhoys Wiggins

No.	Pos.	Nation	Player
17	MF	NIR	Josh McQuoid (Note: Player loaned out to Millwall on 25 November, then sold on 4 January.)
18	MF	IRL	Harry Arter
19	MF	ENG	Danny Hollands
20	MF	ENG	Mark Molesley
21	DF	ENG	Stephen Purches
22	MF	WAL	Joe Partington
23	DF	ENG	Lee Bradbury (Note: Player became caretaker manager on 15 January, retired the following day, and then became permanent manager on 28 January.)
24	FW	ENG	Michael Symes
28	DF	SCO	Warren Cummings
29	FW	ENG	Jayden Stockley
33	FW	ENG	Steve Fletcher
34	FW	ENG	Danny Ings

== Transfers ==
=== Transfers in ===
Date from	Position	Nationality	Name	From	Fee	Ref.
4 June 2010	MF	(England)	Marc Pugh	Hereford United	Compensation	
4 June 2010	FW	(England)	Michael Symes	Accrington Stanley	Free	
4 June 2010	FW	(England)	Steve Lovell	Partick Thistle	Free	
7 June 2010	MF	(Republic of Ireland)	Harry Arter	Woking	Undisclosed	
7 June 2010	DF	(England)	Stephen Purches	Leyton Orient	Free	
7 June 2010	DF	(England)	Mitchell Nelson	Tooting & Micham	Undisclosed	
21 July 2010	DF	(Wales)	Rhoys Wiggins	Norwich City	Nominal	
1 February 2011	DF	(France)	Mathieu Baudry	(France) Troyes	Undisclosed	
1 February 2011	MF	(England)	Ben Williamson	(Spain) Jerez Industrial	Free	

=== Transfers out ===
Date from	Position	Nationality	Name	From	Fee	Ref.
	MF	(England)	Sammy Igoe	Havant & Waterlooville		
10 June 2010	FW	(England)	Jeff Goulding	Cheltenham Town	Free	
	DF		Scott Guyett	Dorchester Town		
21 August 2010	FW	(Jersey)	Brett Pitman	Bristol City	£1,000,000	
4 January 2011	FW	(Northern Ireland)	Josh McQuoid	Millwall	Undisclosed	
31 January 2011	DM	(England)	Marvin Bartley	Burnley	Undisclosed	

=== Loans in ===
Date from	Position	Nationality	Name	From	Date until	Ref.
23 September 2010	RB	(England)	Adam Smith	Tottenham Hotspur	23 October 2010 (later extended until the end of the season)	

=== Loans out ===
Date from	Position	Nationality	Name	To	Date until	Ref.
25 November 2010	FW	(Northern Ireland)	Josh McQuoid	Millwall	4 January 2011	

== Competitions ==
=== Football League One ===
==== League table ====
Pos	Team	Pld	W	D	L	GF	GA	GD	Pts	Promotion, qualification or relegation
4	Peterborough United (O, P)	46	23	10	13	106	75	+31	79	Qualification for League One play-offs
5	Milton Keynes Dons	46	23	8	15	67	60	+7	77	Qualification for League One play-offs
6	Bournemouth	46	19	14	13	75	54	+21	71	Qualification for League One play-offs
7	Leyton Orient	46	19	13	14	71	62	+9	70	
8	Exeter City	46	20	10	16	66	73	−7	70	

Updated to match(es) played on 2 May 2011. Source: BBC
Rules for classification: 1) points; 2) goal difference; 3) number of goals scored.
(O) Play-off winners; (P) Promoted

==== Result round by round ====
Round	1	2	3	4	5	6	7	8	9	10	11	12	13	14	15	16	17	18	19	20	21	22	23	24	25	26	27	28	29	30	31	32	33	34	35	36	37	38	39	40	41	42	43	44	45	46
Ground	A	H	A	H	A	H	A	H	H	A	A	H	A	H	A	H	A	H	A	H	A	H	H	A	H	H	A	H	A	H	H	A	H	A	H	A	H	A	H	A	H	A	A	H	A	H
Result	L	W	W	D	D	W	L	W	W	L	D	W	D	L	D	W	D	W	L	L	W	W	W	L	D	W	W	W	D	W	D	D	W	W	L	L	L	D	D	L	L	W	D	W	D	L
Position	19	8	5	5	7	3	8	3	2	3	3	3	2	4	7	3	4	3	5	6	4	3	2	3	4	2	2	2	2	2	2	2	2	2	2	5	5	6	6	6	6	6	6	6	6	6

Updated to match(es) played on 4 February 2011. Source: afcb.co.uk
A = Away; H = Home; W = Win; D = Draw; L = Loss

==== Results ====
7 August 2010 Round 1	Charlton	1–0	Bournemouth	The Valley, Charlton
15:00 BST	Sodje 22'	Report		Attendance: 16,236; Referee: Hegley

14 August 2010 Round 2	Bournemouth	5–1	Peterborough	Dean Court, Bournemouth
15:00 BST	Pugh 10'; Robinson 20'; Pitman 50' 57' 65'	Report	61' Langmead	Attendance: 5,949; Referee: Miller

21 August 2010 Round 3	Tranmere	0–3	Bournemouth	Prenton Park, Tranmere
15:00 BST		Report	8' McQuoid; 18' (pen.) Symes; 61' Pugh	Attendance: 4,847; Referee: Boyeson

28 August 2010 Round 4	Bournemouth	3–3	Notts County	Dean Court, Bournemouth
15:00 BST	McQuoid 3' 25'; Robinson 28'	Report	30' Burgess; 90+1' Westcarr; 90+5' Smith	Attendance: 6,447; Referee: Danny McDermid

4 September 2010 Round 5	Huddersfield	2–2	Bournemouth	Galpharm Stadium, Huddersfield
15:00 BST	Kay 45+2'; Roberts 28' (pen.)	Report	33' McQuoid; 79' Pugh	Attendance: 12,426; Referee: Ilderton

11 September 2010 Round 6	Bournemouth	3–0	Dagenham & Redbridge	Dean Court, Bournemouth
15:00 BST	Pearce 38'; McQuoid 42'; Wiggins 55'	Report		Attendance: 5,501; Referee: Williamson

18 September 2010 Round 7	Oldham	2–1	Bournemouth	Boundary Park, Oldham
15:00 BST	Lee 78'; Tounkare 81'	Report	45' Wiggins	Attendance: 3,912; Referee: Pawson

25 September 2010 Round 8	Bournemouth	2–0	Carlisle	Dean Court, Bournemouth
15:00 BST	Garyy 48'; Symes 64' (pen.)	Report		Attendance: 6,103; Referee: Phillips

28 September 2010 Round 9	Bournemouth	3–0	Exeter	Dean Court, Bournemouth
15:00 BST	Symes 2' 68' (pen.); Pugh 29'	Report		Attendance: 6,823; Referee: Linnington

2 October 2010 Round 10	Southampton	2–0	Bournemouth	St. Mary's, Southampton
15:00 BST	Lambert 19' (pen.) 55' (pen.)	Report		Attendance: 26,289; Referee: Wright

9 October 2010 Round 11	Brighton	1–1	Bournemouth	Withdean Stadium, Brighton
15:00 BST	LuaLua 61'	Report	90+2' (pen.) Pugh	Attendance: 7,348; Referee: Sheldrake

16 October 2010 Round 12	Bournemouth	3–2	MK Dons	Dean Court, Bournemouth
15:00 BST	Hollands 55'; Robinson 65'; Pugh 71'	Report	45+1' O'Hanlon; 86' (pen.) Leven	Attendance: 6,715; Referee: East

23 October 2010 Round 13	Sheffield Wednesday	1–1	Bournemouth	Hillsborough Stadium, Sheffield
15:00 BST	Mellor 82'	Report	25' Garry	Attendance: 17,863; Referee: Russel Booth

30 October 2010 Round 14	Bournemouth	1–2	Colchester	Dean Court, Bournemouth
15:00 BST	Fletcher 87'	Report	T. Williams 16'; I. Henderson 80'	Attendance: 6,575; Referee: Hooper

2 November 2010 Round 15	Brentford	1–1	Bournemouth	Griffin Park, Brentford
19:45 BST	Grabban 68' (pen.)	Report	Hollands 64'	Attendance: 5,278; Referee: Woolmer

13 November 2010 Round 16	Bournemouth	3–0	Walsall	Dean Court, Bournemouth
15:00 BST	McQuoid 29', 70', 87'	Report		Attendance: 5,601; Referee: Ward

20 November 2010 Round 17	Leyton Orient	2–2	Bournemouth	Brisbane Road, London
15:00 BST	Téhoué 85', 90'	Report	Pugh 2', 48'	Attendance: 4,531; Referee: Hill

23 November 2010 Round 18	Bournemouth	2–0	Yeovil	Dean Court, Bournemouth
19:45 BST	Hollands 19'; McQuoid 36'	Report		Attendance: 6,465; Referee: Stroud

11 December 2010 Round 19	Bournemouth	0–1	Hartlepool	Dean Court, Bournemouth
15:00 BST		Report	Brown 31'	Attendance: 6,129; Referee: Danny McDermid

28 December 2010 Round 20	MK Dons	2–0	Bournemouth	stadium:mk, Milton Keynes
15:00 BST	Guy 6'; Kouo-Doumbé 86'	Report		Attendance: 7,638; Referee: Langford

1 January 2011 Round 21	Swindon	1–2	Bournemouth	County Ground, Swindon
15:00 BST	Ritchie 21'	Report	Pugh 12'; Pearce 80'	Attendance: 8,874; Referee: Phil Gibbs

3 January 2011 Round 22	Bournemouth	3–1	Brentford	Dean Court, Bournemouth
15:00 BST	Feeney 11'; Bartley 70'; Fletcher 88'	Report	Bradbury 65' (o.g.)	Attendance: 6,877; Referee: Linington

8 January 2011 Round 23	Bournemouth	3–0	Plymouth	Dean Court, Bournemouth
15:00 BST	Hollands 4'; Feeney 38'; Pugh 55' (pen.)	Report		Attendance: 7,589; Referee: Wright

14 January 2011 Round 24	Colchester United	2–1	Bournemouth	Weston Homes Community Stadium
19:45 GMT	Gillespie 77', 84'		Fletcher 54'	Attendance: 3,445; Referee: Darren Deadman

18 January 2011 Round 25	Rochdale	0–0	Bournemouth	Spotland Stadium
19:45 GMT				Attendance: 2,312; Referee: Shoebridge

22 January 2011 Round 26	Bournemouth	1–0	Brighton	Dean Court, Bournemouth
15:00 GMT	Feeney 62'			Attendance: 9,762; Referee: Hill

29 January 2011 Round 27	Plymouth Argyle	1–2	Bournemouth	Home Park, Plymouth
15:00 GMT	Fallon 71'		Pugh 19'; Fletcher 84'	Attendance: 8,836; Referee: D'Urso

1 February 2011 Round 28	Bournemouth	3–2	Swindon Town	Dean Court, Bournemouth
19:45	Feeney 8'; Ings 27'; Hollands 73'		Caddis 21'; Ritchie 58'	Attendance: 7,212; Referee: Iain Williamson

5 February 2011 Round 29	Bournemouth	1–1	Leyton Orient	Dean Court, Bournemouth
15:00	Symes 39'		Cox 90'	Attendance: 6,717; Referee: Steve Tanner

12 February 2011 Round 30	Walsall	0–1	Bournemouth	Bescot Stadium, Walsall
15:00			Symes 52'	Attendance: 4,103; Referee: Dave Foster

19 February 2011 Round 31	Bournemouth	1–1	Huddersfield Town	Dean Court, Bournemouth
	Symes 74'		Cadamarteri 89'	Attendance: 7,923; Referee: David Phillips

22 February 2011 Round 32	Bournemouth	0–0	Sheffield Wednesday	Dean Court, Bournemouth
				Attendance: 7,268; Referee: Graham Horwood

26 February 2011 Round 33	Dagenham & Redbridge	1–2	Bournemouth	Victoria Road, Dagenham
	Nurse 48'		Ings 56'; Robinson 88'	Attendance: 2,768; Referee: Rob Lewis

5 March 2011 Round 34	Bournemouth	3–0	Oldham Athletic	Dean Court, Bournemouth
	Hollands 20'; Symes 47'; Dalla Valle 80'			Attendance: 7,075; Referee: Lee Mason

8 March 2011 Round 35	Exeter City	2–0	Bournemouth	St James' Park, Exeter
	Cureton 16'; Logan 59'			Attendance: 4,537; Referee: Gary Sutton

12 March 2011 Round 36	Bournemouth	1–3	Southampton	Dean Court, Bournemouth
	Dalla Valle 6'		Barnard 11'; Hammond 71'; Lambert 88'	Attendance: 10,008; Referee: Andre Marriner

19 March 2011 Round 37	Carlisle United	1–0	Bournemouth	Brunton Park, Carlisle
	Murphy 26'			Attendance: 4,385; Referee: Bobby Madley

26 March 2011 Round 38	Bournemouth	2–2	Charlton Athletic	Dean Court, Bournemouth
	Pugh 30'; Hollands 57'		Wagstaff 28'; Wright-Phillips 81'	Attendance: 7,752; Referee: Mark Haywood

1 April 2011 Round 39	Peterborough United	3–3	Bournemouth	London Road, Peterborough
	Mackail-Smith 11', 42'; Rowe 15'		Ings 35'; Fletcher 71'; Smith 90'	Attendance: 6,670; Referee: Jon Moss

5 April 2011 Round 40	Bristol Rovers	1–0	Bournemouth	Memorial Stadium, Bristol
	Symes 74'			Attendance: 6,691; Referee: Graham Salisbury

9 April 2011 Round 41	Bournemouth	1–2	Tranmere Rovers	Dean Court, Bournemouth
	Ings 90'		Goodison 41'; McGurk 90'	Attendance: 6,004; Referee: Oliver Langford

16 April 2011 Round 42	Notts County	0–2	Bournemouth	Meadow Lane, Nottingham
			Robinson 67'; Ings 77'	Attendance: 6,010; Referee: Andy Haines

23 April 2011 Round 43	Yeovil Town	2–2	Bournemouth	Huish Park, Yeovil
	Virgo 86' (pen.); MacDonald 90'		Ings 55' (pen.), 68'	Attendance: 6,150; Referee: Steve Tanner

25 April 2011 Round 44	Bournemouth	2–1	Bristol Rovers	Dean Court, Bournemouth
	Baudry 84'; Fletcher 88'		Brown 4'	Attendance: 7,869

30 April 2011 Round 45	Hartlepool United	2–2	Bournemouth	Victoria Park, Hartlepool
	Boyd 52' (pen.); Flinders 90'		Lovell 29'; McDermott 38'	Attendance: 3,159; Referee: Jock Waugh

7 May 2011 Round 46	Bournemouth	1–2	Rochdale	Dean Court, Bournemouth
	Pearce 27'		Done 35'; Gray 80'	Attendance: 9,005

==== Play-offs ====
14 May 2011	Bournemouth	1–1	Huddersfield Town	Dean Court, Bournemouth
12:45	McDermott 60'	Report	Kilbane 22'	Attendance: 9,043; Referee: Mick Russell

18 May 2011	Huddersfield Town	3–3 (a.e.t.) (4–2 p)	Bournemouth	Galpharm Stadium, Huddersfield
19:45	Peltier 26'; Ward 45+2'; Kay 105+2'	Report	Lovell 44' (pen.), 63'; Ings 104'	Attendance: 16,444; Referee: Neil Swarbrick
	Penalties
	Novak (penalty scored); Ward (penalty scored); Kilbane (penalty scored); Kay (penalty scored)		(penalty scored) Symes; (penalty missed) Feeney; (penalty missed) Robinson; (penalty scored) Cooper

=== League Cup ===
10 August 2010 R1	Southampton	2–0	Bournemouth	St Mary's Stadium, Southampton
19:45 BST	Lallana 63'; Oxlade-Chamberlain 86'	Report		Attendance: 17,135; Referee: Mark Crossley

=== FA Cup ===
6 November 2010 Round 1	Bournemouth	5–3	Tranmere	Dean Court, Bournemouth
15:00 BST	McQuoid 1' 4' 57'; Pugh 7'; Feeney 61'	Report	27' Cresswell; 42' Goodison; 53' Moore	Attendance: 3,951; Referee: Malone

14 December 2010 Round 2	Notts County	3–1	Bournemouth	Meadow Lane, Nottingham
19:45 BST	Pearce 18'; Hughes 35'; Cummings 45' (o.g.)	Report	Fletcher 84'	Attendance: Meadow Lane; Referee: Swarbrick

=== Football League Trophy ===
31 August 2010 Round 1	Bournemouth	0–0 (0–3 p)	Torquay	Dean Court, Bournemouth
19:45 BST		Report		Attendance: 3,140; Referee: Scott
	Penalties
	Cummings (penalty missed); Bradbury (penalty missed); Pugh (penalty missed)		(penalty scored) Robertson; (penalty scored) Wroe; (penalty scored) Nicholson

== Squad statistics ==
Appearances for Football League One matches only

No.	Pos	Nat	Player	Total		League One		FA Cup		League Cup		League Trophy	
No.	Pos	Nat	Player	Apps	Goals	Apps	Goals	Apps	Goals	Apps	Goals	Apps	Goals
1	GK	(Iraq) IRQ	Shwan Jalal	45	0	43	0	0	0	1	0	1	0
3	DF	(England) ENG	Ryan Garry	12	2	10	2	0	0	1	0	1	0
4	DF	(England) ENG	Shaun Cooper	37	0	33+3	0	0	0	1	0	0	0
5	DF	(England) ENG	Jason Pearce	48	3	46	3	0	0	1	0	1	0
6	MF	(England) ENG	Marvin Bartley	28	1	24+2	1	0	0	1	0	1	0
7	MF	(England) ENG	Marc Pugh	43	12	40+1	12	0	0	1	0	1	0
8	MF	(England) ENG	Anton Robinson	47	5	45	5	0	0	1	0	1	0
9	FW	Jersey	Brett Pitman (sold on 23 August)	3	3	2	3	0	0	1	0	0	0
10	FW	(England) ENG	Steve Lovell	7	1	5+2	1	0	0	0	0	0	0
11	MF	(England) ENG	Liam Feeney	48	4	44+2	4	0	0	1	0	1	0
14	FW	(England) ENG	Lyle Taylor	11	0	2+9	0	0	0	0	0	0	0
15	DF	(England) ENG	Adam Smith (On loan from Tottenham Hotspur)	38	1	38	1	0	0	0	0	0	0
16	DF	(Wales) WAL	Rhoys Wiggins	36	2	34+1	2	0	0	1	0	0	0
17	MF	(Northern Ireland) NIR	Josh McQuoid	17	9	15+2	9	0	0	0	0	0	0
18	MF	(Republic of Ireland) IRL	Harry Arter	19	0	7+11	0	0	0	0	0	1	0
19	MF	(England) ENG	Danny Hollands	44	7	31+11	7	0	0	1	0	1	0
20	MF	(England) ENG	Mark Molesley	2	0	0+2	0	0	0	0	0	0	0
21	DF	(England) ENG	Stephen Purches	11	0	6+3	0	0	0	1	0	1	0
22	MF	(Wales) WAL	Joe Partington	5	0	2+3	0	0	0	0	0	0	0
23	DF	(England) ENG	Lee Bradbury	16	0	8+6	0	0	0	1	0	1	0
24	FW	(England) ENG	Michael Symes	23	8	16+6	8	0	0	1	0	0	0
25	DF	(England) ENG	Tim Stephenson	0	0	0	0	0	0	0	0	0	0
28	DF	(Scotland) SCO	Warren Cummings	15	0	9+5	0	0	0	0	0	1	0
29	FW	(England) ENG	Jayden Stockley	5	0	0+4	0	0	0	0	0	1	0
30	GK	(England) ENG	Dan Thomas	0	0	0	0	0	0	0	0	0	0
31	DF	(England) ENG	Jason Tindall	0	0	0	0	0	0	0	0	0	0
32	DF	(England) ENG	Mitchell Nelson	0	0	0	0	0	0	0	0	0	0
33	FW	(England) ENG	Steve Fletcher	38	6	7+31	6	0	0	0	0	0	0
34	FW	(England) ENG	Danny Ings	26	7	21+5	7	0	0	0	0	0	0
	MF	(England) ENG	Ben Williamson	4	0	0+4	0	0	0	0	0	0	0
	DF	(France) FRA	Mathieu Baudry	3	1	1+2	1	0	0	0	0	0	0
	FW	(England) ENG	Nicholas Bignall	5	0	3+2	0	0	0	0	0	0	0
	GK	(England) ENG	Jon Stewart	4	0	3+1	0	0	0	0	0	0	0
	FW	(Finland) FIN	Lauri Dalla Valle	8	2	5+3	2	0	0	0	0	0	0
	MF	(Republic of Ireland) IRL	Donal McDermott	9	1	6+3	1	0	0	0	0	0	0
