= Claus Bech Jørgensen =

Danish-Faroese footballer and coach (born 1976)

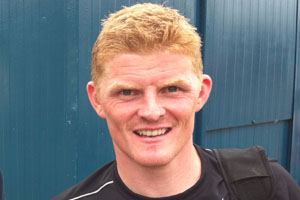
- Jørgensen pictured whilst on trial at Tamworth in 2010

Personal information
- Full name: Claus Bech Jørgensen
- Date of birth: 27 April 1976 (age 50)
- Place of birth: Holstebro, Denmark
- Height: 1.78 m (5 ft 10 in)
- Position: Midfielder

Senior career*
Years	Team	Apps	(Gls)
1994–1997	Holstebro BK		
1997–1998	AGF Aarhus	0	(0)
1998–1999	AC Horsens	28	(19)
1999–2001	AFC Bournemouth	87	(14)
2001–2003	Bradford City	50	(12)
2003–2006	Coventry City	52	(6)
2004	→ AFC Bournemouth (loan)	17	(0)
2006–2009	Blackpool	100	(6)
2009	Port Vale	4	(0)
2009	Fleetwood Town	4	(0)
Total		342+	(57+)

International career
2004–2006	Faroe Islands	10	(1)

Managerial career
- 2023–2024: AaB
- * Club domestic league appearances and goals

Claus Bech Jørgensen (born 27 April 1976) is a Faroese former professional footballer who is a youth team coach at Danish women's team Fortuna Hjørring. Born in Denmark, he represented the Faroe Islands national team between 2004 and 2006.

He first established himself as a player in the Danish Football League with Holstebro BK, AGF Aarhus and AC Horsens, though did not make the Superliga. In 1999, he joined the Football League in England. He later made over 100 appearances for AFC Bournemouth and Blackpool, as well as more than 50 appearances for Bradford City and Coventry City. He was named Bournemouth's Player of the Year for the 1999–2000 season. He helped Blackpool to win promotion out of League One via the play-offs in 2007. He ended his career in 2010 after brief spells with Port Vale and Fleetwood Town. He went on to coach at Coventry City, Tamworth and AaB.

== Club career ==
=== Early career in Denmark ===
Jørgensen is an attacking midfielder who started his career in his native Denmark with Holstebro BK. The club lost their Danish 1st Division (second tier) status in 1995–96. He ended up at AC Horsens via AGF Aarhus. In 1998–99, he struck 17 goals for Horsens, becoming the joint-fourth top scorer in the 1st Division that season.

=== Move to England: AFC Bournemouth ===
In 1999, he joined the English Second Division club AFC Bournemouth, becoming a professional footballer at the age of 23. On 7 August, he made his debut in the English game; the Dean Court faithful witnessed a 2–1 victory over Cambridge United. Two weeks later came his first goal; his team dished out a 4–0 thrashing of Colchester United. He played 53 games for the "Cherries" in 1999–2000, picking up a total of six goals along the way, and became the club's Player Of The Year.

"Claus has progressed well since coming here and I'm very pleased we've been able to see to it that he stays at the club. He always gives 100%, whatever the situation. It can lift the team when you have that kind of willingness in the players."

— Bournemouth manager Mel Machin on Jørgensen.

On 2 September 2000, he had a mixed time at Layer Road, scoring in the 44th minute, he was sent off on the 69th, bringing Bournemouth down to nine men. He finished the season strongly, however, making 48 appearances and bagging nine goals, including a run of five in seven games. The last of those goals – the second in a 2–0 home win over Northampton Town on 28 April 2001 – was also the last goal ever at the old Dean Court before it was demolished and rebuilt.

=== Bradford City ===
At the end of the season he switched clubs for First Division Bradford City. He was limited to twenty appearances in 2001–02, though did score a late equaliser against Burnley at Turf Moor on 20 March. During the 2002–03 season, although starting the season out of favour and rebuffing interest from both Hull City and Luton Town, he remained at the club. He ended up scoring in eight successive league away games. This unusual feat almost equalled the record held by Dixie Dean, who scored nine goals in nine successive league games. He hit a shot against the post in what would have been the ninth; Bradford lost the game 1–0 to Gillingham on 21 April. His run also picked up nine points for the "Bantams". Overall, he struck eleven times in 34 games that season. There was talk of an exodus from Valley Parade as the cash-strapped club struggled to offer new deals to its players.

=== Coventry City ===
Rejecting a new contract, the player became available on a free transfer in the summer as he was out contract, he drew attention from Norwich City and Burnley, before signing for Coventry City in the summer.

After making just nine appearances in the first half of the 2003–04 season, he joined old club Bournemouth on a one-month loan in January 2004. The loan was twice extended as he impressed back at Dean Court. He played 17 games for the "Cherries" before returning to the Highfield Road for an end of season clash with Crystal Palace. In 2004–05 he once again was on the sidelines, partly due to a rib injury he suffered while playing for the Faroe Islands in their World Cup qualification game away to Cyprus. Making just twenty appearances, he managed to find the net on three occasions. In June 2005, he put pen to paper on a new contract. Jørgensen became the first ever player to score at the Ricoh Arena, on 20 August 2005, in a 3–0 win against Queens Park Rangers. He played a more respectable 31 games in 2005–06, picking up three goals – and one red card, along the way.

=== Blackpool ===
He left Coventry at the end of the season, signing with League One Blackpool. The 2006–07 season was highly successful for the "Tangerines". Jørgensen played 39 games, including their 2–0 victory over Yeovil Town at Wembley in the play-off final. On 7 May 2008, he was offered a new contract by the club. He made 38 appearances in 2007–08, his four goals were important to a club hovering above the relegation zone.

He made his 100th league appearance for the "Seasiders" on 3 May 2009, the final day of the 2008–09 season, in a 1–0 win over Swansea City at the Liberty Stadium. On 9 June, Blackpool confirmed that Jørgensen had not been offered a new deal and was being released. He had made exactly 100 league appearances for the club.

"He'll be a sad loss but I think at this stage of his career it's important he plays football."

— Blackpool assistant manager Steve Thompson following Jørgensen's release.

=== Later career ===
In August 2009 he joined League Two club Port Vale on trial – he had served under manager Micky Adams at Coventry. He quickly joined on a non-contract basis, in order that he might be selected for first-team football, this meant he could not be paid for his services. The club offered Jørgensen a contract in September 2009, but he rejected the offer, deciding to look for a contract elsewhere.

On 8 September 2009, he signed for Conference North side Fleetwood Town. His debut came later the same day in a 2–0 win over Farsley Celtic at Throstle Nest. He left the club in late October after four league and one FA Cup appearances.

In November, he began training with League Two side Cheltenham Town. "Robins" caretaker manager John Schofield explained that as Jørgensen lives relatively locally, the club were having a look at him and that "If Claus is happy with what he sees from us and we are happy with what we see, there may be a chance he could stay around a bit longer." He spent the summer of 2010 training with Conference club Tamworth, after manager Gary Mills seemed keen to offer him a contract. No deal materialized however, and he retired from playing to focus on football coaching along with running his restorative floor cleaning company, Unique Floorcare.

In the April 2012 edition of the football magazine FourFourTwo, fans of both Bournemouth and Blackpool voted him the 'Best Foreigner In The club's History', describing him as 'dominating games in midfield' and 'his box-to-box play was integral in Blackpool defying expectations by staying in the Championship'.

== International career ==
Jørgensen elected to play for the Faroe Islands, the homeland of his mother, as he believed he would probably never play for Denmark. He won all of his caps whilst playing for Coventry City.

His only international goal, a glancing header into the far corner of the net, came in a 2–2 draw at Cyprus' GSP Stadium on 9 October 2004. It was an important goal as it ensured the only point in the Island's World Cup qualification campaign. He won eight of his other caps in that same campaign, playing in both defeats to Switzerland, France and Israel, as well as a home defeat to Cyprus and the Republic of Ireland.

His final international was in a UEFA Euro 2008 qualifying match against Georgia on 16 August 2006. The Georgians ran out 6–0 winners at Svangaskarð. He quit the international scene the following month, after he was benched for a qualifier with Scotland.

== Coaching career ==
Having coached at Coventry City's Academy for two years, Jørgensen joined National League North club Tamworth as head coach of the youth team, after being recruited by former teammate Andy Morrell. He holds the UEFA A Licence. He returned to Denmark to coach the AaB under-15 team in July 2019. Jørgensen became the head coach for then-A-Liga side AaB starting halfway through the 2022–23 season until the conclusion of the 2023–24 season. In August 2024, he began a new role developing youth players at Danish women's team Fortuna Hjørring.

== Personal life ==
He is married to Lorna, a hairdresser, and has three children. He is also a qualified helicopter pilot.

== Career statistics ==
=== Club ===
Appearances and goals by club, season and competition
Club	Season	League			FA Cup		League Cup		Other		Total	
Club	Season	Division	Apps	Goals	Apps	Goals	Apps	Goals	Apps	Goals	Apps	Goals
AGF Aarhus	1997–98	Danish Superliga	0	0								
AC Horsens	1998–99	Danish 1st Division	28	19								
AFC Bournemouth	1999–2000	Second Division	44	6	3	0	4	0	2 (Note: Appearance(s) in the Football League Trophy.)	0	53	6
AFC Bournemouth	2000–01	Second Division	43	8	3	0	2	1	0	0	48	9
AFC Bournemouth	Total		87	14	6	0	6	1	2	0	101	15
Bradford City	2001–02	First Division	18	1	0	0	2	0	—		20	1
Bradford City	2002–03	First Division	32	11	1	0	1	0	—		34	11
Bradford City	Total		50	12	1	0	3	0	0	0	54	12
Coventry City	2003–04	First Division	8	0	0	0	2	0	—		10	0
Coventry City	2004–05	Championship	17	3	2	0	1	0	—		20	3
Coventry City	2005–06	Championship	27	3	2	0	2	0	—		31	3
Coventry City	Total		52	6	4	0	5	0	0	0	61	6
AFC Bournemouth (loan)	2003–04	Second Division	17	0	—		—		—		17	0
Blackpool	2006–07	League One	31	2	4	0	0	0	4 (Note: 1 appearance in the Football League Trophy and 3 appearances in the play-offs.)	0	39	2
Blackpool	2007–08	Championship	37	4	1	0	0	0	—		38	4
Blackpool	2008–09	Championship	32	0	1	0	0	0	—		33	0
Blackpool	Total		100	6	6	0	0	0	4	0	110	6
Port Vale	2009–10	League Two	4	0	0	0	1	0	0	0	5	0
Fleetwood Town	2009–10	Conference North	4	0	1	0	0	0	0	0	5	0
Career total			342	57	18	0	15	1	6	0	381	58

=== International ===
Appearances and goals by national team and year
National team	Year	Apps	Goals
Faroe Islands	2004	3	1
Faroe Islands	2005	6	0
Faroe Islands	2006	1	0
Total		10	1

== Honours ==
Blackpool

- Football League One play-offs: 2007

Individual

- AFC Bournemouth Player of the Year: 1999–2000
