= James Hayter (footballer) =

English footballer

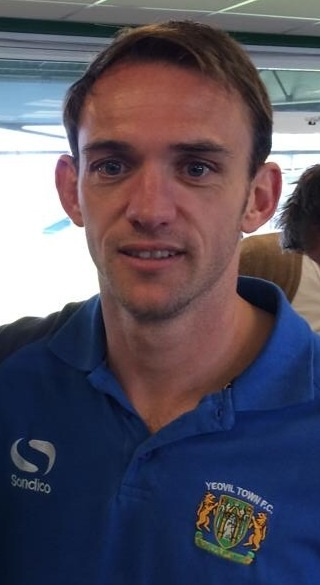
- Hayter in 2014

Personal information
- Full name: James Edward Hayter
- Date of birth: 9 April 1979 (age 47)
- Place of birth: Sandown, Isle of Wight, England
- Height: 5 ft 9 in (1.75 m)
- Position: Forward

Team information
- Current team: AFC Bournemouth (U18 coach)

Youth career
- ?–1997: AFC Bournemouth

Senior career*
Years	Team	Apps	(Gls)
1997–2007	AFC Bournemouth	358	(94)
1998–1999	→ Salisbury City (loan)	8	(4)
2007–2012	Doncaster Rovers	162	(39)
2012–2015	Yeovil Town	119	(25)
2015–2018	Havant & Waterlooville	84	(13)
2017	→ Weymouth (loan)	3	(0)
Total		734	(175)
- * Club domestic league appearances and goals

James Edward Hayter (born 9 April 1979) is an English former professional footballer who played as a forward; he last played for Weymouth FC. He holds the record for the fastest Football League hat-trick ever and has been on the winning side in three Football League play-off finals.

== Club career ==
=== AFC Bournemouth ===
After progressing through the youth system with the south coast club AFC Bournemouth, Hayter made his official début for them in the 1996–97 season in a 3–1 Division Two defeat to Peterborough United. Despite a promising start, he failed to gain a first-team place and moved to Salisbury City on loan.

His performances there earned him a recall to Bournemouth from manager Mel Machin, scoring the fourth goal in a 4–0 demolition of Stoke on his return, and in October 2000 he equaled the club record for the number of goals scored in a match when he scored 4 against Bury. He was soon established as one of the most consistent and sought-after strikers outside the Premier League, and the proudest moment of his Bournemouth career came in May 2003 when he helped them achieve victory over Lincoln City in the Division Three playoff final.

On 24 February 2004, he came on as an 84th-minute substitute while Bournemouth were 3–0 up at home to Wrexham and scored the fastest Football League hat-trick ever in 2 minutes and 21.88seconds, beating the record set by Jimmy Scarth of Gillingham in 1952. His parents were at the match but missed his hat-trick as they had to leave early to get the last ferry back to the Isle of Wight.

Hayter finished as Bournemouth's top scorer for the 2005–06 season, with 22 goals to his name, which proved vital in saving them from relegation. While struggling to score for Bournemouth in the 2006–07 season, he was a vital part of their first-team and scored twice against Oldham Athletic (3–2 win), the winner at Chesterfield (1–0) and one in the 5–0 win against Leyton Orient.

=== Doncaster Rovers ===
On 30 May 2007, Hayter signed for Doncaster Rovers for a club record transfer fee of £200,000.

His 47th-minute header in the 2008 League One play-off final, against Leeds United helped Doncaster Rovers gain promotion to the Championship.

After Rovers' promotion to the Championship, Hayter struggled to find the net at the start of the 2008/9 season, but Rovers continued to show faith in Hayter, until an injury kept him out until March 2009. He started to find the form on his return to the side, scoring his first goal of the season in narrow 2–1 defeat to Watford on 4 April 2009. He scored another 3 goals in the 2008/9 season against Ipswich Town, Plymouth Argyle, and Crystal Palace, taking his goal tally for the season to 4. He made a good start to the 2009/10 season as well, scoring on an opening day at Watford, and also grabbing goals in games against Cardiff, Sheffield United and Crystal Palace to take his tally for the season to 4 in early December. He ended the 2009/10 season with 9 goals – a very good achievement given that Hayter played the majority of the season in a deeper role in the team due to Rovers' success using Billy Sharp as a lone striker.

He renewed his contract with Rovers in the summer of 2010, signing on for another two years. Hayter started the 2010/11 season well, scoring a headed goal in Doncaster's opening day win against Preston North End at Deepdale. Most of Hayter's goals for Rovers in the 2010/11 season have been headers and he has proved himself to be one of the best headers of the ball outside the Premiership. His headed goal against Middlesbrough on 17 December was his 7th league goal of the season. In May 2012, Hayter was released by the club after the expiry of his contract.

=== Yeovil Town ===
On 28 June 2012, Hayter signed for League One side Yeovil Town on a two-year contract, taking the vacant number 9 shirt. He scored two of Yeovil's goals in a 3 – 1 away win over Brentford on 21 August. Two weeks later, he got a goal against his former club Doncaster Rovers in a 2 – 1 win for Yeovil. Hayter scored twice in Yeovil's 2–2 draw with Torquay United in the Football League Trophy, as well as netting in the penalty shootout to help the Glovers through to the next round. On 19 May 2013, Hayter won promotion via the play-offs for the third time in his career as Yeovil were promoted to the Championship for the first time in the club's history.

Hayter was released by Yeovil at the end of the 2014–15 season following their relegation to League Two.

=== Havant & Waterlooville ===
In June 2015, Hayter joined Conference South side Havant & Waterlooville.

In June 2018, having made 84 league appearances and scored 13 goals for Havant & Waterlooville, Hayter departed the club.

=== Weymouth loan ===
In November 2017, Hayter joined Weymouth on a short-term loan from Havant & Waterlooville, making his début as a half-time substitute in a 0–3 Southern League Premier Division defeat at Slough Town.

After a month, having made three appearances for Weymouth, Hayter returned to Havant & Waterlooville in December 2017, featuring as a late substitute in a goalless draw with Bognor Regis Town.

== Career statistics ==
As of 1 May 2018

Appearances and goals by club, season and competition
Club	Season	League			FA Cup		League Cup		Other		Total	
Club	Season	Division	Apps	Goals	Apps	Goals	Apps	Goals	Apps	Goals	Apps	Goals
AFC Bournemouth	1996–97	Second Division	2	0	0	0	0	0	0	0	2	0
AFC Bournemouth	1997–98	Second Division	5	0	0	0	0	0	1 (Note: Appearances in Football League Trophy)	0	6	0
AFC Bournemouth	1998–99	Second Division	20	2	0	0	0	0	0	0	20	2
AFC Bournemouth	1999–2000	Second Division	31	2	1	0	2	1	2	1	36	4
AFC Bournemouth	2000–01	Second Division	40	11	3	1	1	0	1	0	45	12
AFC Bournemouth	2001–02	Second Division	44	7	2	1	1	0	1	0	48	8
AFC Bournemouth	2002–03	Third Division	45	9	6	1	1	0	7 (Note: 4 appearances in Football League Third Division play-offs, 3 appearances and 1 goal in Football League Trophy)	4	59	14
AFC Bournemouth	2003–04	Second Division	44	14	2	0	1	0	1	0	48	14
AFC Bournemouth	2004–05	League One	39	19	3	0	3	3	1	0	46	22
AFC Bournemouth	2005–06	League One	46	20	1	0	2	0	1	0	50	20
AFC Bournemouth	2006–07	League One	42	10	3	2	1	0	1	0	47	12
AFC Bournemouth	Total		358	94	21	5	12	4	16	5	407	108
Doncaster Rovers	2007–08	League One	34	7	2	2	2	1	4 (Note: 3 appearances and 1 goal in Football League One play-offs, 1 appearance in Football League Trophy)	1	42	11
Doncaster Rovers	2008–09	Championship	27	4	0	0	1	0	—		28	4
Doncaster Rovers	2009–10	Championship	38	9	1	0	2	0	—		41	9
Doncaster Rovers	2010–11	Championship	32	9	2	1	1	0	—		35	10
Doncaster Rovers	2011–12	Championship	31	4	1	0	1	1	—		33	5
Doncaster Rovers	Total		162	33	6	3	7	2	4	1	179	39
Yeovil Town	2012–13	League One	44	14	1	0	2	0	7 (Note: 3 appearances in Football League One play-offs, 4 appearances and 2 goals in Football League Trophy)	2	54	16
Yeovil Town	2013–14	Championship	37	6	2	2	1	0	—		40	8
Yeovil Town	2014–15	League One	38	5	3	0	1	0	1	0	43	5
Yeovil Town	Total		119	25	6	2	4	0	8	2	137	29
Havant & Waterlooville	2015–16	National League South	35	10	2	1	—		5	3	42	14
Havant & Waterlooville	2016–17	Isthmian Premier Division	28	2	1	1	—		3	2	32	5
Havant & Waterlooville	2017–18	National League South	21	1	3	2	—		4	6	28	9
Havant & Waterlooville	Total		84	13	6	4	—		12	11	102	28
Career totals			723	165	39	14	23	6	40	19	825	204

== Honours ==
Bournemouth

- Football League Third Division play-offs: 2003

Doncaster Rovers

- Football League One play-offs: 2008

Yeovil Town

- Football League One play-offs: 2013

Individual

- Isle of Wight Footballer of the Year: 2004
- Football League One Player of the Month: October 2004
- Football League Championship Player of the Month: November 2010
