= Carl Fletcher (Welsh footballer) =

Wales international footballer

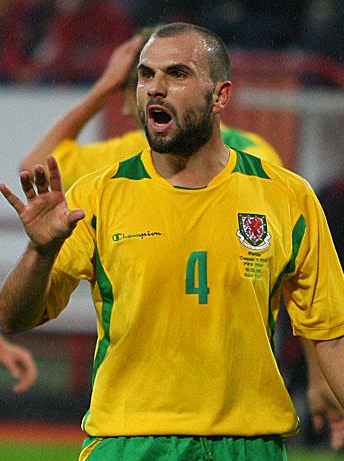
- Fletcher playing for Wales in 2008

Personal information
- Full name: Carl Neil Fletcher
- Date of birth: 7 April 1980 (age 46)
- Place of birth: Camberley, England
- Height: 5 ft 10 in (1.78 m)
- Position: Midfielder

Senior career*
Years	Team	Apps	(Gls)
1997–2004	AFC Bournemouth	193	(19)
2004–2006	West Ham United	44	(3)
2005	→ Watford (loan)	3	(0)
2006–2009	Crystal Palace	68	(4)
2008	→ Nottingham Forest (loan)	5	(0)
2009	→ Plymouth Argyle (loan)	13	(1)
2009–2012	Plymouth Argyle	88	(7)
2013–2014	Barnet	3	(0)
Total		417	(34)

International career
2004–2009	Wales	36	(1)

Managerial career
- 2011–2013: Plymouth Argyle
- 2019: Leyton Orient
- * Club domestic league appearances and goals

Carl Neil Fletcher (born 7 April 1980) is a former professional football player and manager, who most recently was head coach at Leyton Orient. As a midfielder Fletcher represented Wales at senior international level for five years, scoring one goal in 36 appearances.

Having made his professional debut for AFC Bournemouth in 1998, Fletcher went on to play for West Ham United, Watford, Crystal Palace, Nottingham Forest and Plymouth Argyle, making 414 appearances in league competition and scoring 34 goals. Born in Camberley, Fletcher retired from playing in 2012 to focus on his role as manager of Plymouth Argyle, keeping the Pilgrims in League Two despite serious financial issues. His time as Plymouth Argyle manager has since seen Fletcher described as "a crucial figure in the club's history both now and years into the future." He resumed his playing career in October 2013 with Barnet.

== Playing career ==
After playing football for Oakdale Middle School (1988–1992), Fletcher moved onto being Captain of his local football team in Poole, Dorset. Fletcher started his career at Football League club AFC Bournemouth, making his debut in February 1998 as a 17-year-old. He made 185 league starts for the south-coast club, including captaining the side to a 5–2 victory over Lincoln City in the 2003 Division 3 playoff final and scoring two of the goals himself, before earning a move to West Ham United in 2004 for £275,000.

Fletcher then played in the Premier League after West Ham won promotion the season he signed for them. He also had a month-long loan spell at Watford. Upon his return from Watford in October 2005, he made 12 league appearances for West Ham. Fletcher's last league game was on 7 May 2006. In the last game of the season, with Tottenham Hotspur needing a win to qualify for the Champions League, Fletcher scored the first goal in a 2–1 West Ham win with the Tottenham team affected by food poisoning. It was his only Premier League goal. On 13 May 2006, Fletcher was drafted into the West Ham team to face Liverpool in the FA Cup Final due to the suspension of Hayden Mullins.

The FA Cup final proved to be his last competitive match for the Hammers, however, as he signed for Crystal Palace in that summer, for £400,000. He was immediately appointed as captain by manager Peter Taylor. After Neil Warnock took over, the captaincy went to Mark Hudson. Fletcher captained Wales for the first time on 28 May 2009 against Iceland. However, he was substituted after just 41 minutes after damaging his ankle ligaments.

After Neil Warnock was appointed as Palace manager, Fletcher found first-team opportunities limited, starting many games on the substitutes bench, which eventually led to him and teammate Paul Ifill being placed on the transfer list in August 2008. Fletcher was signed on loan by Nottingham Forest in October of that year due to their ever-growing injury list. However, he only made five appearances in this period and due to a problematic back injury, was sent back to Palace.

Fletcher signed a month-long emergency loan deal with Plymouth Argyle on 20 February 2009, scoring on his debut against Sheffield United. A string of commanding performances led to the loan being extended a month later until the end of the 2008–09 campaign. Following his release by Crystal Palace in May 2009, Fletcher signed a two-year contract with Plymouth. Having been made captain by Paul Sturrock, he led the team in this role throughout his time as a player with the club. Fletcher extended his contract by 12 months during the summer of 2011. He retired from playing at the end of the 2011–12 season in order to focus on management.

Fletcher resumed his playing career in October 2013 when he joined Conference Premier side Barnet. Prior to signing a contract he trained with the club during pre-season and also spent time back at Bournemouth. He made six appearances, three in the league, before being released in January 2014.

== Coaching and managerial career ==
Fletcher was appointed caretaker manager of Plymouth Argyle on 19 September 2011, a day after Peter Reid was sacked by acting chairman Peter Ridsdale.

Plymouth Argyle were recovering from a tulmultous 2010/11 campaign that had seen the Club docked 10 points and being served its third winding-up petition in three years. They had failed to win a game when Fletcher took charge. He led the club to their first win of the season, beating Macclesfield Town 2–0. The club was taken over by Akkeron Group at the end of October and Fletcher immediately became the club's full-time manager, having won two and drawn one of his seven games as caretaker.

Fletcher managed to guide Plymouth Argyle to League Two safety, a run of six games unbeaten between 17 March and 11 April proving critical. Beren Cross, journalist at Plymouth Live, said, "Many fans will look back on Fletcher as a crucial figure in the club's history both now and years into the future. That campaign will forever be marked as a point of resistance in the club's history, a season in which the rot, the slump was stopped."

He signed a one-year rolling contract at the end of the 2011–12 season and retired as a player. "I have enjoyed playing. There have been highs and lows, and tough days and good days, but it's on to a new era in my life," he said to The Herald. "I'm starting again and trying to build my reputation up as a manager now."

Fletcher was sacked on 1 January 2013 after a run of eight defeats in 13 league games left the club 21st in the League Two table. In a tearful post-match interview with BBC Radio Devon, he said that "since I've been down here we've been through a lot, that's football really. I might be a young manager but I know if you don't win games you don't keep your job."

Fletcher was appointed youth team manager at Bournemouth on 15 January 2014 after leaving Barnet.

In October 2019, Fletcher was appointed as head coach with EFL League Two club Leyton Orient. He was sacked on 14 November after 29 days and five games in charge, without a win.

== Personal life ==
In September 2010, Fletcher was unsuccessful in an attempt to get out of jury duty at Plymouth Crown Court by saying that he was too well known in the local area.

== Career statistics ==
=== Club ===
Appearances and goals by club, season and competition
Club	Season	League			FA Cup		League Cup		Other		Total	
Club	Season	Division	Apps	Goals	Apps	Goals	Apps	Goals	Apps	Goals	Apps	Goals
AFC Bournemouth	1997–98	Second Division	1	0	0	0	0	0	0	0	1	0
AFC Bournemouth	1998–99	Second Division	1	0	0	0	0	0	0	0	1	0
AFC Bournemouth	1999–2000	Second Division	25	3	3	0	0	0	1 (Note: Appearance(s) in Football League Trophy)	0	29	3
AFC Bournemouth	2000–01	Second Division	43	6	2	1	2	0	1	0	48	7
AFC Bournemouth	2001–02	Second Division	35	5	2	0	1	0	0	0	38	5
AFC Bournemouth	2002–03	Third Division	43	1	6	0	1	0	6 (Note: 4 appearances and 1 goal in Football League Trophy, 2 appearances and 2 goals in Third Division play-offs)	3	56	4
AFC Bournemouth	2003–04	Second Division	40	2	3	0	1	0	1	0	45	2
AFC Bournemouth	2004–05	League One	6	2	0	0	1	0	0	0	7	2
AFC Bournemouth	Total		194	19	16	1	6	0	9	3	225	23
West Ham United	2004–05	Championship	32	2	3	0	0	0	1 (Note: Appearance in Championship play-offs)	0	36	2
West Ham United	2005–06	Premier League	12	1	4	0	1	0	0	0	17	1
West Ham United	Total		44	3	7	0	1	0	1	0	53	3
Watford (loan)	2005–06	Championship	3	0	0	0	0	0	0	0	3	0
Crystal Palace	2006–07	Championship	37	3	2	0	0	0	0	0	39	3
Crystal Palace	2007–08	Championship	28	1	1	0	0	0	0	0	29	1
Crystal Palace	2008–09	Championship	3	0	1	0	2	0	0	0	6	0
Crystal Palace	Total		68	4	4	0	2	0	0	0	74	4
Nottingham Forest (loan)	2008–09	Championship	5	0	0	0	0	0	0	0	5	0
Plymouth Argyle (loan)	2008–09	Championship	13	1	0	0	0	0	0	0	13	1
Plymouth Argyle	2009–10	Championship	41	4	2	0	0	0	0	0	43	4
Plymouth Argyle	2010–11	League One	38	2	0	0	0	0	1	0	39	2
Plymouth Argyle	2011–12	League Two	9	1	2	1	0	0	1	0	12	2
Plymouth Argyle	Total		101	8	4	1	0	0	2	0	107	9
Career total			415	34	31	2	9	0	12	3	467	39

=== International ===
Scores and results list Wales' goal tally first.

#	Date	Venue	Opponent	Score	Result	Competition
1.	6 February 2008	Racecourse Ground, Wrexham	Norway	1–0	3–0	Friendly

== Managerial statistics ==
As of 10 November 2019

Managerial record by team and tenure
Team	From	To	Record					Ref
Team	From	To	P	W	D	L	Win %	Ref
Plymouth Argyle	19 September 2011	1 January 2013	70	17	27	26	24.3	
Leyton Orient	16 October 2019	14 November 2019	5	0	2	3	0.0	
Total			75	17	29	29	22.7	—

== Honours ==
AFC Bournemouth

- Football League Third Division play-offs: 2003

West Ham United

- Football League Championship play-offs: 2005
- FA Cup runner-up: 2005–06

Individual

- Plymouth Argyle Player of the Year: 2009–10, 2010–11
