= Richard Hughes (footballer) =

Scottish footballer (born 1979)

Personal information
- Full name: Richard Daniel Hughes
- Date of birth: 25 June 1979 (age 47)
- Place of birth: Glasgow, Scotland
- Height: 6 ft 1 in (1.85 m)
- Position: Defensive midfielder

Youth career
- 1992–1993: Atalanta
- 1993–1998: Arsenal

Senior career*
Years	Team	Apps	(Gls)
1998–2002	AFC Bournemouth	131	(14)
2002–2011	Portsmouth	131	(3)
2003	→ Grimsby Town (loan)	12	(1)
2012–2014	AFC Bournemouth	26	(1)
Total		300	(17)

International career
2004–2005	Scotland	5	(0)
- * Club domestic league appearances and goals

Richard Daniel Hughes (born 25 June 1979) is a Scottish football executive and former player who currently serves as sporting director for Saudi Pro League club Al-Hilal.

Hughes played as a defensive midfielder, and started his professional career as a junior in Italy for Atalanta, before moving to Arsenal and Bournemouth, where he made his professional debut. He most prominently featured for Portsmouth from 2002 until 2011 and had a brief loan spell with Grimsby Town in 2003. After a year out of the game, Hughes signed again for Bournemouth. He finally retired from playing in May 2014, aged 34. He was capped five times by Scotland.

== Playing career ==
=== Early career ===
Born in Scotland, Hughes grew up in Italy and began his career as a youth player at Serie A side Atalanta. After moving back to the United Kingdom, Hughes spent five years with Arsenal as a youth player. He did not make the transition to the first team and so left the club to join AFC Bournemouth in the summer of 1998.

Hughes made his debut for Bournemouth in a 2–0 victory over Lincoln City, and became a regular member of the first team. He was signed by Portsmouth for £50,000 in summer 2002.

=== Portsmouth ===
After making his debut for Portsmouth in a 1–1 draw at Sheffield United, Hughes was loaned out to Grimsby Town, where he played 12 games and scored one goal against Brighton. He was given a Premier League appearance in December 2003, and he remained a squad member for the remainder of the 2003–04 campaign. He scored the winning goal, his first for Portsmouth, in a 1–0 FA Cup victory over Liverpool on 22 February 2004. On 28 July 2006 he pledged his future to the club, signing a three-year contract. On 15 August 2007, playing against Manchester United, Hughes was headbutted by Cristiano Ronaldo, after Hughes allegedly provoked him. Ronaldo was red-carded for his actions. The game finished 1–1. Hughes was part of Portsmouth's 2007–08 FA Cup-winning team. Despite not making the squad for the final he appeared in the earlier rounds.

In January 2009, Hughes was offered an extension to his Portsmouth contract. His second competitive goal for Portsmouth came when he scored in a 4–1 League Cup win against Hereford on 25 August 2009. Hughes' first league goal for Portsmouth came in a 3–3 draw against Leeds United at Elland Road on 28 December 2010, his last game for the club. The Scottish midfielder's strike deflected off Leeds defender Andy O'Brien on its way into the net. Originally awarded as an own goal to O'Brien, the goal was subsequently credited to Hughes by the dubious goals committee as his first league goal for the club. Hughes played his last game for Portsmouth on 28 December 2010. Under the terms of his contract, signed when Portsmouth were still in the Premier League, he was entitled to a new contract with increased wages if he had played one more game. As Portsmouth could not afford to fulfil the original offer, and he was not prepared to accept alternative terms; he remained at Portsmouth without playing in the second half of the 2010–11 season. He was subsequently released at the end of the season.

=== Return to Bournemouth ===
In the summer of 2012, a year after retiring from the game, Hughes was convinced to come out of retirement by Paul Groves, who managed him at Grimsby and was assistant manager while Hughes was at Portsmouth. In turn he re-joined Bournemouth following Groves' appointment as manager. Hughes made his second debut for Bournemouth in a 5–3 loss at Sheffield United on 1 September 2012, coming on as a 46th-minute substitute for Shaun MacDonald. On 8 September, Hughes scored the only goal in the match against Yeovil, securing Bournemouth their first League One victory. In May 2014, with his contract due to expire, Hughes took the decision to retire aged 34.

=== International play ===
Hughes gained recognition for his performances at Bournemouth with a call-up to represent Scotland at under-21 level. His performances also earned him selection for the Scottish senior side, and he won his first cap against Estonia in May 2004.

== Post-retirement football career ==
Following his retirement from the game, Hughes later joined Bournemouth's recruitment team under Eddie Howe and was promoted to Technical Director during the club's stay in the Premier League. On 5 March 2024, AFC Bournemouth announced Hughes would leave the club at the end of the 2023–24 season. On 20 March, Liverpool announced that Hughes would become their sporting director on 1 June. He left the role in September 2026, having overseen Liverpool's 2024–25 Premier League triumph, to take up the same role at Al-Hilal.

== Personal life ==
Hughes' father worked for Penguin Books in Italy and the family lived in Milan although his mother moved back to Glasgow for a month to give birth.

Attending a British school in the city, Hughes spoke English in the home and school and Italian when out with friends. Initially playing football for local boys teams he was invited to sign for AC Milan at the age of ten. However, he turned them down, later saying it was because at the time he was very shy. A year later Hughes was picked up by the Atalanta youth system and spent seven years with the club, before moving to Arsenal in late 1993.

Hughes revealed he planned on life after retirement, working for BT Sport as a pundit and running a restaurant with his brother called Mele e Pere and based in Brewer Street, Soho, London.

== Career statistics ==
Club performance			League		Cup		League Cup		Continental		Total	
Season	Club	League	Apps	Goals	Apps	Goals	Apps	Goals	Apps	Goals	Apps	Goals
England			League		FA Cup		League Cup		Europe		Total	
1998–99	AFC Bournemouth	Second Division	44	2								
1999–00	AFC Bournemouth	Second Division	21	2								
2000–01	AFC Bournemouth	Second Division	44	8								
2001–02	AFC Bournemouth	Second Division	22	2								
2002–03	Portsmouth	First Division	6	0								
2002–03	Grimsby Town	First Division	12	1								
2003–04	Portsmouth	Premier League	11	0	4	1						
2004–05	Portsmouth	Premier League	16	0								
2005–06	Portsmouth	Premier League	26	0								
2006–07	Portsmouth	Premier League	18	0								
2007–08	Portsmouth	Premier League	13	0	2	0						
2008–09	Portsmouth	Premier League	20	0	1	0	1	0	1	0	23	0
2009–10	Portsmouth	Premier League	10	0	3	0	3	1	0	0	16	1
2010–11	Portsmouth	Championship	11	1	0	0	3	0	0	0	14	1
Total	England		235	15								
Career total			235	15								

== Honours ==
Portsmouth

- FA Cup runner-up: 2009–10
