= Josh McQuoid =

Northern Irish footballer (born 1989)

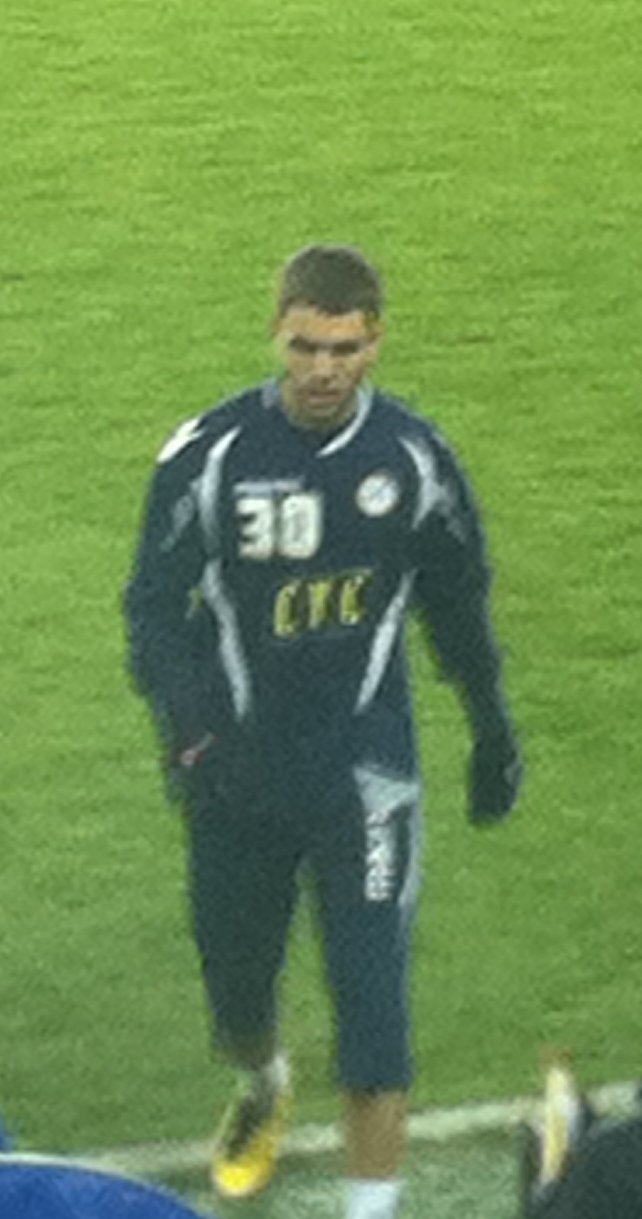
- McQuoid playing for Millwall in 2010

Personal information
- Full name: Joshua Joseph Brian McQuoid
- Date of birth: 15 December 1989 (age 36)
- Place of birth: Southampton, England
- Height: 5 ft 9 in (1.75 m)
- Positions: Winger; striker

Team information
- Current team: Wimborne Town

Youth career
- 2002: Southampton
- 2002–2006: AFC Bournemouth

Senior career*
Years	Team	Apps	(Gls)
2006–2011	AFC Bournemouth	69	(10)
2010–2011	→ Millwall (loan)	4	(0)
2011–2012	Millwall	12	(1)
2012	→ Burnley (loan)	17	(1)
2012–2015	AFC Bournemouth	35	(3)
2014	→ Peterborough United (loan)	14	(1)
2014	→ Coventry City (loan)	14	(3)
2015–2018	Luton Town	32	(3)
2017	→ Stevenage (loan)	16	(1)
2017	→ Torquay United (loan)	14	(2)
2018	Aldershot Town	16	(1)
2018–2022	Weymouth	92	(23)
2022–2023	Aldershot Town	21	(0)
2023–2025	Weymouth	41	(1)
2025–	Wimborne Town	0	(0)

International career^{‡}
2007	Northern Ireland U19	4	(0)
2008–2009	Northern Ireland U21	8	(2)
2009	Northern Ireland B	1	(0)
2010–2011	Northern Ireland	5	(0)
- * Club domestic league appearances and goals as of 11:04, 6 June 2025 (UTC) ‡ National team caps and goals as of 11:05, 4 October 2012 (UTC)

Joshua Joseph Brian McQuoid (born 15 December 1989) is a semi-professional footballer who plays as a winger or a striker for Southern League Premier Division South club Wimborne Town.

== Club career ==
=== AFC Bournemouth ===
Born in Southampton, Hampshire, McQuoid started out at Sway Juniors alongside future teammate Sam Vokes, and began his youth career at the Southampton Academy, but was released after one year. He then joined the youth system at AFC Bournemouth, progressing through the ranks to make his first-team debut as a substitute for Brett Pitman in a 2–0 win at home to Doncaster Rovers on 3 March 2007. McQuoid made eight appearances in 2007–08 and signed his first professional contract with the club in May 2008.

McQuoid was ever-present for Bournemouth in pre-season ahead of 2008–09, which they began with a 17-point deduction for financial irregularities. He made his first appearance as a substitute at home to Gillingham on the opening day of the season, which finished as a 1–1 draw. McQuoid provided an assist for Brett Pitman in a 3–1 win at home to Darlington for Bournemouth's first home league win of the season on 27 September 2008. He finished the season with 22 appearances as the club avoided relegation, despite their points deduction and retained their League Two status.

McQuoid played more regularly in 2009–10, though not until injuries to other squad members in the second half of the season saw him called up to the starting lineup. He scored his first professional goal in a 4–0 win at home to Port Vale on 1 May 2010, a result that confirmed Bournemouth's promotion to League One. McQuoid finished the season with one goal from 33 appearances, as Bournemouth finished second in League Two. After the end of the season, McQuoid was offered a new one-year contract by the club, which he signed on 19 May.

Following Brett Pitman's departure from Bournemouth, McQuoid was utilised as a striker by manager Eddie Howe rather than his prior position as a winger, and went on to score five goals in four matches. His goalscoring form led the club's supporters to compare him to Pitman, though manager Howe played down the claim. In November 2010, McQuoid scored a hat-trick for Bournemouth in consecutive home wins over Tranmere Rovers in the FA Cup and Walsall in the league. After the victory over Tranmere, his strike partner Steve Fletcher said "It's not just about him scoring goals – he's got pace, good feet, skill, ability, good energy levels and he's good in the air. There's not a lot he hasn't got. He's never going to be a big bruiser but he doesn't want to be because that would take away from all the other attributes he's got." McQuoid's final goal of 2010–11 for Bournemouth came with the second goal in a 2–0 victory at home to Yeovil Town on 23 November.

=== Millwall ===
Despite his willingness to begin talks with Bournemouth over a new contract, McQuoid instead signed for Championship club Millwall on loan on 25 November 2010, with a view to a permanent move taking place in the January transfer window. Eddie Howe later stated that McQuoid's departure had a negative impact on the squad's confidence. He debuted as a half-time substitute for Calvin Andrew in a 3–0 win at home to Scunthorpe United on 4 December. McQuoid provided an assist for Jason Puncheon, who later scored a hat-trick, in a 3–0 win over rivals Crystal Palace. He joined Millwall permanently on 5 January 2011 for an undisclosed fee, believed to be around £550,000. However, a week after joining the club permanently, McQuoid tore a ligament in his ankle during training. After three months on the sidelines, McQuoid returned to the team for a 3–2 win at home to Leeds United on 9 April, having entered the match as an 89th-minute substitute. McQuoid scored his first goal for Millwall, a 30-yard shot into the top corner in a 4–0 victory over Preston North End two weeks later. He finished 2010–11 with one goal from 11 appearances for Millwall.

The 2011–12 season saw McQuoid under pressure from Millwall supporters after a goalless start to his campaign. After spending the first half of the season sidelined by injuries and poor form, McQuoid joined Burnley on a three-month loan on 20 January 2012, linking back up with his former Bournemouth manager Eddie Howe. He debuted a day later as a half-time substitute in a 0–0 draw at home to Derby County. McQuoid scored his first goal for Burnley with the opener in a 2–1 win away to Doncaster Rovers on 9 April. He returned to Millwall after the loan expired, having made 17 appearances and scored one goal. McQuoid later stated that his move to Millwall did not work out as expected, admitting that he joined the club both to test himself at Championship level and the opportunity to earn more money.

=== Return to AFC Bournemouth ===
McQuoid rejoined AFC Bournemouth on 30 May 2012 on a three-year contract in a swap deal, with Scott Malone joining Millwall in the process. Following his return to the club, McQuoid said "I hadn't played much at Millwall and I went to Burnley where I was in and out of the team, so I wanted to come here and play games." He injured his right heel in pre-season ahead of 2012–13, which kept him out for three weeks. McQuoid returned to the team for a 5–3 defeat away to Sheffield United on 1 September, having entered the match as a 57th-minute substitute. His first goal of 2012–13 came on 23 October against Notts County, scoring Bournemouth's first goal in a 3–3 draw. McQuoid scored twice for Bournemouth in a 4–0 win at home to Dagenham & Redbridge in the FA Cup first round on 3 November. He finished the season with five goals from 39 appearances, as Bournemouth finished second in League One.

McQuoid damaged his right knee during a pre-season training session ahead of 2013–14 that kept him out for five months. He returned to the team to make his only appearance of 2013–14 for Bournemouth in a 1–1 draw at home to Ipswich Town on 29 December 2013. After making his return, McQuoid said making his return to the squad was "a nice surprise". He joined League One club Peterborough United on loan until the end of the season on 12 February 2014. McQuoid debuted two days later as a 70th-minute substitute in a 0–0 draw at home to Walsall. His first goal for Peterborough came with the opener in the 2014 Football League Trophy Final against Chesterfield, which finished as a 3–1 victory that saw him awarded the first winner's medal of his career. After the match, McQuoid said that playing and scoring at Wembley Stadium was something he had dreamed of doing since he was young. He scored his first league goal for Peterborough in a 4–2 win away to Shrewsbury Town on 26 April, having entered the match as a 75th-minute substitute. McQuoid completed the loan spell with two goals from 16 appearances.

McQuoid was loaned out again on 4 August 2014, joining League One club Coventry City on loan until January 2015. He debuted on the opening day of 2014–15, playing the full 90 minutes in a 3–2 defeat away to Bradford City. His first goal for Coventry came with the opener in a 2–2 draw at home to Barnsley on 19 August. McQuoid scored five goals from 19 appearances, with Coventry keen to extend his loan further. However, McQuoid returned to Bournemouth on 9 January 2015. He was released by Bournemouth at the end of the season, after which manager Eddie Howe stated that McQuoid needed to "create a different path in his career."

=== Luton Town ===
On 29 June 2015, McQuoid signed for League Two club Luton Town on a three-year contract. After signing, McQuoid stated that he was pleased to have signed a long-term deal with the club, providing him with stability after spending his more recent seasons either injured or out on loan. He debuted on the opening day of 2015–16 in a 1–1 draw away to Accrington Stanley. His first goal for Luton came on 24 October against league-leaders Plymouth Argyle, when he scored an equaliser in the 76th minute to make the score 1–1, although Luton went on to lose 2–1. McQuoid scored twice for Luton in a 2–1 win away to Crawley Town in the FA Cup first round on 7 November. Following Luton's 2–0 victory at home to Barnet a week later, McQuoid was praised by strike partner Paul Benson who said "He's very clever, makes some good runs and is easy to play upfront with as he's an intelligent player." He suffered a setback when he required an operation on his knee on 25 January 2016, which kept him out for almost three months, and returned to the team for a 1–0 defeat at home to Stevenage on 2 April, having entered the match as a 62nd-minute substitute. McQuoid made seven successive appearances in the end of season run-in, including five consecutive starts and finished the season with five goals from 35 appearances.

McQuoid made his first appearance of 2016–17 after being introduced as an 89th-minute substitute in a 2–1 defeat away to Stevenage on 20 August 2016. His first goals of the season came against Swindon Town in the EFL Trophy second round on 6 December, which finished as a 3–2 victory. However, McQuoid struggled to break into the first-team and was loaned out to fellow League Two club Stevenage on 19 January 2017 until the end of 2016–17. He debuted two days later as a 62nd-minute substitute in a 2–0 defeat away to Hartlepool United. McQuoid scored his first goal on 29 April in a 1–1 draw away to Yeovil Town and completed the loan spell with 16 appearances and one goal. Upon his return to Luton, McQuoid was transfer-listed by the club.

On 22 September 2017, McQuoid joined National League club Torquay United on a three-month loan. He finished the loan with two goals from 16 appearances.

=== Aldershot Town ===
On 26 January 2018, McQuoid signed for National League club Aldershot Town on a contract until the end of 2017–18, after leaving Luton by mutual consent. He was released at the end of the season.

=== Weymouth ===
McQuoid signed for Southern League Premier Division South club Weymouth on 4 August 2018 on a contract of undisclosed length. An unfortunate injury kept McQuoid out for the majority of his first season at Weymouth, but he re-signed for the 2019/20 season in May 2019. In July 2019, manager Mark Molesley named McQuoid team captain.

=== Aldershot Town ===
On 17 June 2022, McQuoid returned to Aldershot Town on a one-year deal following Weymouth's relegation to the National League South.

=== Weymouth ===
McQuoid returned to National League South club Weymouth on 29 July 2023 on a contract of undisclosed length.

=== Wimborne Town ===
On 5 June 2025, McQuoid joined Southern League Premier Division South side Wimborne Town.

== International career ==
McQuoid qualified to play for Northern Ireland through his Belfast-born grandfather. He was first called up by Northern Ireland U19 in March 2007, before even making a first-team appearance for Bournemouth. McQuoid was then called up by Northern Ireland U21 on 8 November 2008. McQuoid scored his first Northern Ireland U21 goals in a 3–1 win over Scotland U21. In May 2009, McQuoid was called up by Northern Ireland B team for the match against Scotland B. He was called up to the senior Northern Ireland team for the first time for a friendly against Morocco in November 2010 and won a penalty in the dying stages of the match, converted by Rory Patterson to earn his team a draw. He has since won four further caps for the senior team, all between 2010 and 2011.

== Personal life ==
McQuoid was educated at Priestlands School, where he met his future Bournemouth teammate, Sam Vokes.

In April 2023, McQuoid was diagnosed with Sarcoma in his leg.

== Career statistics ==
=== Club ===
As of end of 2024–25 season

Appearances and goals by club, season and competition
Club	Season	League			FA Cup		League Cup		Other		Total	
Club	Season	Division	Apps	Goals	Apps	Goals	Apps	Goals	Apps	Goals	Apps	Goals
AFC Bournemouth	2006–07	League One	2	0	0	0	0	0	0	0	2	0
AFC Bournemouth	2007–08	League One	5	0	2	0	0	0	1 (Note: Appearance(s) in Football League Trophy)	0	8	0
AFC Bournemouth	2008–09	League Two	16	0	2	0	1	0	3	0	22	0
AFC Bournemouth	2009–10	League Two	29	1	2	0	1	0	1	0	33	1
AFC Bournemouth	2010–11	League One	17	9	1	3	0	0	0	0	18	12
AFC Bournemouth	Total		69	10	7	3	2	0	5	0	83	13
Millwall	2010–11	Championship	11	1	—		—		—		11	1
Millwall	2011–12	Championship	5	0	2	0	1	0	—		8	0
Millwall	Total		16	1	2	0	1	0	—		19	1
Burnley (loan)	2011–12	Championship	17	1	—		—		—		17	1
AFC Bournemouth	2012–13	League One	34	3	4	2	0	0	1	0	39	5
AFC Bournemouth	2013–14	Championship	1	0	0	0	0	0	—		1	0
AFC Bournemouth	2014–15	Championship	0	0	—		—		—		0	0
AFC Bournemouth	Total		35	3	4	2	0	0	1	0	40	5
Peterborough United (loan)	2013–14	League One	14	1	—		—		2	1	16	2
Coventry City (loan)	2014–15	League One	14	3	1	0	1	0	3	2	19	5
Luton Town	2015–16	League Two	29	3	2	2	2	0	2	0	35	5
Luton Town	2016–17	League Two	3	0	1	0	0	0	4 (Note: Appearances in EFL Trophy)	2	8	2
Luton Town	2017–18	League Two	0	0	—		0	0	2	1	2	1
Luton Town	Total		32	3	3	2	2	0	8	3	45	8
Stevenage (loan)	2016–17	League Two	16	1	—		—		—		16	1
Torquay United (loan)	2017–18	National League	14	2	1	0	—		1 (Note: Appearance in FA Trophy)	0	16	2
Aldershot Town	2017–18	National League	16	1	—		—		0	0	16	1
Weymouth	2018–19	Southern League Premier Division South	9	2	2	0	—		0	0	11	2
Weymouth	2019–20	National League South	21	8	1	0	—		4 (Note: Two appearances in FA Trophy, two appearances and one goal in National League South play-offs)	1	26	9
Weymouth	2020–21	National League	31	7	1	0	—		2	1	34	8
Weymouth	2021–22	National League	38	7	2	1	—		2	1	42	9
Weymouth	Total		99	24	6	1	—		8	3	113	28
Aldershot Town	2022–23	National League	7	0	0	0	—		0	0	7	0
Weymouth	2023–24	National League South	7	0	0	0	—		0	0	7	0
Weymouth	2024–25	National League South	34	1	3	1	—		2	0	39	2
Weymouth	Weymouth total		140	25	9	2	0	0	10	3	152	30
Career total			410	51	27	9	6	0	30	9	453	69

=== International ===
As of match played 6 September 2011

Appearances and goals by national team and year
National team	Year	Apps	Goals
Northern Ireland	2010	1	0
Northern Ireland	2011	4	0
Total		5	0

== Honours ==
AFC Bournemouth

- Football League Two runner-up: 2009–10
- Football League One runner-up: 2012–13
- Football League Championship: 2014–15

Peterborough United

- Football League Trophy: 2013–14
