= Brian Stock (footballer) =

Footballer (born 1981)

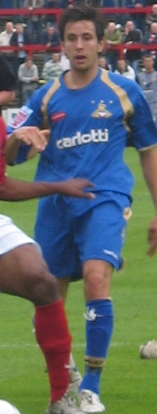
- Stock playing for Doncaster Rovers in 2007

Personal information
- Full name: Brian Stock
- Date of birth: 24 December 1981 (age 44)
- Place of birth: Winchester, England
- Height: 5 ft 11 in (1.80 m)
- Position: Midfielder

Youth career
- –2000: AFC Bournemouth

Senior career*
Years	Team	Apps	(Gls)
2000–2006	AFC Bournemouth	145	(16)
2006	→ Preston North End (loan)	6	(1)
2006–2007	Preston North End	2	(0)
2006–2007	→ Doncaster Rovers (loan)	15	(0)
2007–2012	Doncaster Rovers	178	(18)
2012–2014	Burnley	34	(0)
2014–2019	Havant & Waterlooville	151	(2)
Total		531	(37)

International career
2002–2003	Wales U21	4	(0)
2009–2010	Wales	3	(0)

Managerial career
- 2020–2022: Weymouth
- 2022–2023: Eastleigh (assistant manager)
- 2026–: Hanoi FC (assistant manager)
- * Club domestic league appearances and goals

Brian Benjamin Stock (born 24 December 1981) is a former professional footballer who played as a midfielder and was the assistant manager of Hanoi FC. Born in England, Stock represented Wales at international level.

== Club career ==
=== AFC Bournemouth ===
Stock began his professional career at AFC Bournemouth, making his league debut on 22 January 2000 against Colchester United. Brian Stock is known for scoring the first goal at the newly rebuilt stadium Dean Court (known at the time as The Fitness First Stadium). He did that in the 29th minute of Bournemouth's 3-0 win over Wrexham in November 2001.

He played 145 league games and scored 16 goals for Bournemouth before signing initially on loan to Preston North End in January 2006.

=== Preston North End ===
Preston reportedly paid £125,000 for the midfielder. Stock scored his first and what turned out to be only Preston goal in a 2–0 win over Leeds United.

Lack of first team opportunities however lead to Stock being loaned out to Doncaster Rovers in September 2006.

=== Doncaster Rovers ===
He then signed for Doncaster on 3 January 2007 for £150,000.

Stock played a vital role in Doncaster's 2007–08 promotion season with assured performances in midfield. He filled in as captain for Doncaster in the final two months of the season due to a foot injury to usual skipper Adam Lockwood. Stock captained the side in their Play-Off Final victory over Leeds United at Wembley, and scored the first goal from the penalty spot against Southend in the semi-finals of that Play-Off campaign. Stock is also known for possessing a deadly long range shot and is also a composed penalty taker.

In the wake of promotion to the Championship, Stock extended his contract with Doncaster keeping him at the club until 2011.

On 14 May, it was reported that Wolves had enquired about Stock's availability for a reported £2.5 million. However it was proved that there was no truth in the enquiry.

=== Burnley ===
On 11 August 2012, Stock joined Burnley on a two-year deal for an undisclosed fee, joining up with former teammate Eddie Howe, following the club's pursuit of Stock over the summer. In both his seasons at Burnley, first under Howe and, then later, under Sean Dyche he was a first-team squad player but not a regular. He was released by Burnley at the end of his contract in summer 2014, following Burnley's promotion to the Premier League.

=== Havant & Waterlooville ===
He signed for Havant & Waterlooville in September 2014. He turned down a coaching role at AFC Bournemouth in summer 2018 to continue his playing career with Havant & Waterlooville, but in December 2018 announced that he was to retire in January 2019 to take up this offer.

== International career ==
On 17 March 2008, Stock was called up for the Wales team for the friendly match against Luxembourg, although he did not actually play in the match. He has also represented the Wales Under-21 team. Stock made his Wales debut on 9 September 2009, in a World Cup Qualifying match at home to Russia.

== Coaching career ==
Following the end of his playing career, Stock worked as an academy coach at AFC Bournemouth. On 4 September 2020, following the departure of Mark Molesley to Southend United, Stock was appointed manager of recently promoted National League side Weymouth after time spent working as an academy coach at AFC Bournemouth. On 12 January 2022, following a run of seven successive defeats that left the club in 21st position, four points from safety, Stock was sacked by Weymouth.

He was appointed as Lee Bradbury's assistant manager at Eastleigh in March 2022, but Bradbury and Stock were sacked in August 2023, following a poor start to the 2023–24 season.

On 9 January 2026, He joined Hanoi FC coaching staff. He was the assistant manager of Harry Kewell.

== Career statistics ==
=== Club ===
As of match played 18 February 2017.

Appearances and goals by club, season and competition
Club	Season	League			FA Cup		League Cup		Other		Total	
Club	Season	Division	Apps	Goals	Apps	Goals	Apps	Goals	Apps	Goals	Apps	Goals
AFC Bournemouth	1999–2000	Second Division	5	0	0	0	0	0	0	0	5	0
AFC Bournemouth	2000–01	Second Division	1	0	0	0	0	0	2 (Note: Appearance(s) in Football League Trophy)	0	3	0
AFC Bournemouth	2001–02	Second Division	26	2	2	0	0	0	1	0	29	2
AFC Bournemouth	2002–03	Third Division	27	2	2	0	0	0	5 (Note: 3 appearances in Football League Third Division play-offs, 2 appearances in Football League Trophy)	0	34	2
AFC Bournemouth	2003–04	Second Division	19	3	2	0	0	0	0	0	21	3
AFC Bournemouth	2004–05	League One	41	6	4	0	3	1	1	1	49	8
AFC Bournemouth	2005–06	League One	26	3	1	1	2	0	2	0	31	4
AFC Bournemouth	Total		145	16	11	1	5	1	11	1	172	19
Preston North End	2005–06	Championship	6	1	—		—		0	0	6	1
Preston North End	2006–07	Championship	2	0	—		—		—		2	0
Preston North End	Total		8	1	—		—		0	0	8	1
Doncaster Rovers	2006–07	League One	36	3	4	1	2	1	5	1	47	6
Doncaster Rovers	2007–08	League One	40	5	2	0	0	0	4 (Note: 3 appearances and 1 goal in Football League One play-offs, 1 appearance in Football League Trophy)	1	46	6
Doncaster Rovers	2008–09	Championship	36	6	4	2	0	0	—		40	8
Doncaster Rovers	2009–10	Championship	15	0	2	0	1	0	—		18	0
Doncaster Rovers	2010–11	Championship	37	2	0	0	0	0	—		37	2
Doncaster Rovers	2011–12	Championship	26	1	1	0	1	0	—		28	1
Doncaster Rovers	Total		190	17	13	3	4	1	9	2	216	23
Burnley	2012–13	Championship	25	0	1	0	3	0	—		29	0
Burnley	2013–14	Championship	9	0	0	0	4	0	—		13	0
Burnley	Total		34	0	1	0	7	0	—		42	0
Havant & Waterlooville	2014–15	Conference South	29	0	4	0	—		3 (Note: Appearances in FA Trophy)	1	36	1
Havant & Waterlooville	2015–16	National League South	35	2	5	0	—		6 (Note: Four appearances in FA Trophy, two in Hampshire Senior Cup)	1	46	3
Havant & Waterlooville	2016–17	IL Premier Division	25	0	2	0	—		4 (Note: Two appearances in FA Trophy, one in Hampshire Senior Cup, one in Portsmouth Senior Cup)	0	31	0
Havant & Waterlooville	Total		89	2	11	0	—		13	2	113	4
Career total			466	36	36	4	16	2	33	5	551	47

=== International ===
As of match played 11 August 2010.

International statistics
National team	Year	Apps	Goals
Wales	2009	1	0
Wales	2010	2	0
Total		3	0

== Honours ==
AFC Bournemouth

- Football League Third Division play-offs: 2003

Doncaster Rovers

- Football League One play-offs: 2008
- Football League Trophy: 2006–07
