= Amos Foyewa =

English footballer (born 1981)

Personal information
- Date of birth: 26 December 1981 (age 44)
- Place of birth: Newham, England
- Height: 1.73 m (5 ft 8 in)
- Position: Forward

Youth career
- Charlton Athletic
- West Ham United

Senior career*
Years	Team	Apps	(Gls)
2001–2003	AFC Bournemouth	9	(0)
2003–2005	Woking		
2005–2006	Lewes		
2006	→ St Albans City (loan)		
2006	Thurrock		
2006–2008	AFC Hornchurch		
- Welling United

International career
2004	England C	2	(0)
- * Club domestic league appearances and goals

Amos Foyewa (born 26 December 1981) is an English former professional footballer who played as a forward.

== Club career ==
Born in England to Nigerian parents, Foyewa began his career at Charlton Athletic alongside Jermain Defoe, with whom he also attended St Bonaventure's school with, before the pair joined West Ham United. In 2001, Foyewa joined AFC Bournemouth on a permanent transfer. During his time at Bournemouth, Foyewa made nine Football League appearances.

In 2003, Foyewa signed for Conference side Woking. During Foyewa's two seasons at Woking, he scored 24 goals, before leaving to join Conference South club Lewes. In the second half of the 2005–06 season, Foyewa joined St Albans City on loan. In the summer of 2006, Foyewa briefly played for Thurrock, before signing for AFC Hornchurch. In February 2008, Foyewa left Hornchurch, signing for Welling United.

== International career ==
During his time at Woking, Foyewa made two appearances for England C in the Four Nations Tournament in May 2004.

== Coaching career ==
Following his playing career, Foyewa was assistant manager at Tower Hamlets and Aveley, assisting Justin Gardner.
