= Christer Warren =

English footballer (born 1974)

Personal information
- Full name: Christer Simon Warren
- Date of birth: 10 October 1974 (age 52)
- Place of birth: Weymouth, England
- Height: 5 ft 10 in (1.78 m)
- Position: Midfielder

Senior career*
| Years | Team | Apps | (Gls) |
| ?–1995 | Cheltenham Town | ? | (?) |
| 1995–1997 | Southampton | 8 | (0) |
| 1996 | → Brighton & Hove Albion (loan) | 3 | (0) |
| 1997 | → Fulham (loan) | 11 | (0) |
| 1997–2000 | AFC Bournemouth | 103 | (13) |
| 2000–2002 | Queens Park Rangers | 36 | (0) |
| 2002 | Bristol Rovers | 2 | (0) |
| 2002–2005 | Eastleigh | ? | (?) |
| 2005–2006 | Winchester City | 22 | (5) |
| 2006–2007 | Lymington & New Milton | ? | (?) |
| 2007–2008 | Wimborne Town | 57 | (5) |
| 2012–2013 | FC Boutonnais | 15 | (7) |
- US Melle
| Total | | 163 | (13) |

Managerial career
- 2007–2008: Wimborne Town
- * Club domestic league appearances and goals

Christer Simon Warren (born 10 October 1974) is an English former footballer and Current manager of Blandford United

== Football career ==
Warren started his career at Cheltenham Town then in the Beazer Homes League. On 5 December 1992, he scored Cheltenham's goal in their 1–1 Second Round FA Cup game against AFC Bournemouth forcing a replay. He became Cheltenham's then record "sale" for a fee of £40,000 with clauses about appearances etc.

He was signed for Southampton at the end of the 1994–95 season and was viewed by manager Alan Ball as a good investment, who could play in any position on the left side. He made his debut for The Saints as a substitute away to Arsenal on 23 September 1995, and made a total of seven appearances under new manager David Merrington, including his only start in a 3–0 defeat at Queens Park Rangers. It became clear that the Premiership was too much for him, and in October 1996 he was loaned to Brighton for a month. He made one further substitute appearance for Southampton in March 1997 before spending the rest of the season on loan at Fulham, where he helped them gain promotion from Division 3 under manager Micky Adams.

In October 1997, he moved across the New Forest for a fee of £50,000 to join Bournemouth where he spent three seasons in Division 2. In June 2000, he moved on to Queens Park Rangers on a free transfer and was part of the squad who saw Q.P.R. relegated to Football League Division 2 at the end of the 2000–01 season. After a trial at Oxford United in the summer of 2002 he spent a few weeks with Bristol Rovers on a non-contract basis before dropping down to lower-league football.

In October 2002 he signed for Eastleigh and in October 2005 he joined Winchester City of the Wessex League. In September 2006 he left Winchester to join Lymington & New Milton, before moving on to Wimborne Town in February 2007. In April 2007, he was appointed first-team manager at Wimborne Town but was relieved of his duties in November 2008.

Later he played in French football for FC Boutonnais and finally at US Melle. He settled in La Rochelle.

== Honours ==
Bournemouth

- Football League Trophy runner-up: 1997–98
