= Jason Tindall =

English football player and manager (born 1977)

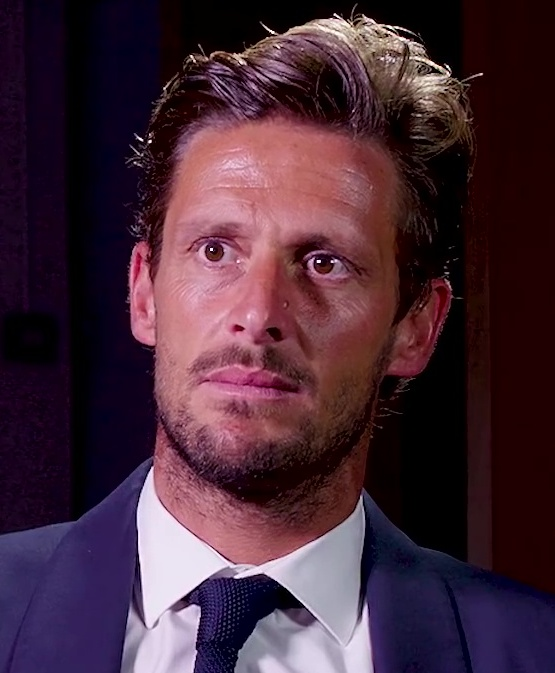
- Tindall in 2020

Personal information
- Full name: Jason James Tindall
- Date of birth: 15 November 1977 (age 48)
- Place of birth: Mile End, England
- Height: 6 ft 1 in (1.85 m)
- Position: Defender

Youth career
- Senrab
- –1995: Arsenal
- 1995–1996: Charlton Athletic

Senior career*
Years	Team	Apps	(Gls)
1996–1998	Charlton Athletic	0	(0)
1998–2006	Bournemouth	171	(6)
2006–2008	Weymouth	17	(1)
2009–2011	Bournemouth	2	(0)
Total		190	(7)

Managerial career
- 2007–2008: Weymouth (player-manager)
- 2020–2021: Bournemouth
- * Club domestic league appearances and goals

Jason James Tindall (born 15 November 1977) is an English professional football manager. A defender during his playing days, Tindall spent the bulk of his career with Bournemouth, making more than 170 appearances for the club. He briefly managed Weymouth, before returning to Bournemouth as assistant manager. Working alongside manager and former teammate Eddie Howe, Tindall helped lead Bournemouth's rise from League Two to the Premier League which saw them win three promotions in six seasons.

After Bournemouth were relegated from the Premier League in 2020, Howe left the club and Tindall was appointed manager. He remained in the role for six months before he was sacked in February 2021 after a poor run of results. After a brief stint as a coach at Sheffield United, Tindall reunited with Howe as his assistant in November 2021 following Howe's appointment as Newcastle United manager.

== Playing career ==
Tindall showed early promise, playing for noted east London youth side Senrab F.C., a club founded in 1961 by his father, Jimmy. Jason Tindall played in midfield with Lee Bowyer, and later joined Arsenal's youth set-up but suffered from knee issues.

Tindall was then an apprentice at Charlton Athletic, but was released and joined AFC Bournemouth on a free transfer in 1998 as a midfielder, becoming a regular in the side after being switched to central defence when Sean O'Driscoll replaced Mel Machin as manager. On 24 April 2004, in a 1–0 win at Peterborough United, Tindall made his last appearance for the Cherries for 18 months, when a knee injury recurred. After missing the entire 2004–05 season, he resorted to surgery in the United States with specialist surgeon Dr Richard Steadman, returning to action on 2 January 2006 as an 86th-minute substitute in the Cherries 1–1 draw with Scunthorpe United at Dean Court.

Released by Bournemouth in the summer of 2006, after a trial at Wycombe Wanderers, Tindall joined local side Weymouth as a utility player.

Tindall was re-registered as a Bournemouth player on Tuesday 24 February 2009, three years after his last appearance, coming on as a substitute against Dagenham and Redbridge.

== Managerial career ==
Tindall was appointed as player-manager of Weymouth in January 2007, but was sacked a year later in January 2008 after a 2007–08 season record of only three wins, leaving the club in 19th, 5 points off of the relegation zone.

=== Assistant manager roles ===
On 2 September 2008, Tindall was appointed as assistant manager to Jimmy Quinn at Bournemouth. With the Cherries performing poorly under Quinn, being second last in the league table at Christmas 2008, Quinn was sacked in January 2009 with Eddie Howe promoted to caretaker manager, and after a string of good results, Howe became the permanent manager with Tindall as his assistant. The duo of Howe and Tindall became the youngest managerial partnership in the Football League, and they soon had a growing reputation as they saved the Cherries from relegation into the Conference National, then in the 2009–10 season led Bournemouth to promotion to League One, finishing 2nd behind Notts County. With Howe having to deal with a transfer embargo, leaving the team with a threadbare squad, Tindall was still registered as a player and made a handful of appearances in the Cherries promotion campaign in 2009–10. After a positive start to the first half of the 2010–11 season in League One, which saw the Cherries in the play-off places throughout the season, Tindall and Howe were drawing significant interest from other clubs. After committing their immediate future to the club on 12 January 2011, Howe and Tindall did a complete U-turn less than a week later as they were confirmed as Manager and Assistant Manager of Championship side Burnley, respectively.

After 18 months at Burnley, Tindall and Howe returned to Bournemouth in October 2012, with the club in the relegation places of League One at the time. By the end of the 2012–13 season, however, the duo steered Bournemouth to the Championship, returning the club to the 2nd tier for just the 2nd time in its history. After a 10th-place finish in the 2013–14 season, Bournemouth were promoted to the Premier League after winning the 2014–15 Championship.

Tindall and Howe would lead the club to a narrow survival in 2015–16, before comfortable finishes of 9th, 12th and 14th in the following 3 seasons. In the 2019-20 season, however, Bournemouth's five-year run in the top flight ended after the club finished in 18th place. On 1 August 2020, Howe left the club by mutual consent and Tindall took over as manager on a temporary basis.

=== Bournemouth ===
On 8 August 2020, one week after Howe's departure, Tindall was appointed as manager of Bournemouth on a permanent basis, following the club's relegation from the Premier League. He signed a three-year contract with the club. On 12 September 2020, Tindall took charge of his first competitive match for Bournemouth, opening the season with a 3–2 victory over Blackburn Rovers.

Following a run of poor results at the start of 2021, Tindall was sacked on 3 February 2021, with the club eight points outside automatic promotion places.

=== Return to assistant coaching ===
On 13 March 2021, Tindall joined Paul Heckingbottom's backroom staff at Sheffield United as a coach. He was later appointed by Newcastle United as assistant head coach in November 2021 following the appointment of manager Eddie Howe, reuniting the pair once again.

Tindall stood in as manager on 13 April 2025, as Howe was hospitalised after contracting pneumonia, winning 4–1 against Manchester United. On 14 April 2025, it was announced that Howe would miss a further two matches, meaning that Tindall would continue to stand in as manager. On 31 July 2026, Newcastle United confirmed that Tindall, amongst other members of the coaching staff, would leave the club, following Howe’s decision to step down as head coach.

== Personal life ==
Tindall is married to Claudine, with whom he has two children, Sienna (born 2006) and Levi (born 2010). Tindall's son Levi plays for Bournemouth's U18s, and in 2026, made his debut for their development squad.

== Career statistics ==
Appearances and goals by club, season and competition
Club	Season	League			FA Cup		League Cup		Other		Total	
Club	Season	Division	Apps	Goals	Apps	Goals	Apps	Goals	Apps	Goals	Apps	Goals
Bournemouth	1998–99	Second Division	17	1	3	0	0	0	0	0	20	1
Bournemouth	1999–2000	Second Division	8	0	0	0	0	0	1 (Note: Appearances in Football League Trophy)	0	9	0
Bournemouth	2000–01	Second Division	45	1	3	0	2	0	1	0	51	1
Bournemouth	2001–02	Second Division	44	3	2	0	0	0	1	0	47	3
Bournemouth	2002–03	Third Division	27	1	4	0	1	0	2	0	34	1
Bournemouth	2003–04	Second Division	19	0	2	0	1	0	1	0	23	0
Bournemouth	2004–05	League One	0	0	0	0	0	0	0	0	0	0
Bournemouth	2005–06	League One	11	0	0	0	0	0	0	0	11	0
Bournemouth	Total		171	6	14	0	4	0	6	0	195	6
Weymouth	2006–07	Football Conference	17	1	1	0	–		0	0	18	1
Bournemouth	2008–09	League Two	2	0	0	0	0	0	0	0	2	0
Bournemouth	2009–10	League One	0	0	0	0	0	0	2	0	2	0
Bournemouth	Total		2	0	0	0	0	0	2	0	4	0
Career total			190	7	15	0	4	0	8	0	217	7

== Managerial statistics ==
Updated 19 April 2025

Managerial record by team and tenure
Team	From	To	Record				
Team	From	To	P	W	D	L	Win %
Bournemouth	8 August 2020	3 February 2021	31	13	10	8	41.94
Total			31	13	10	8	41.94
