= US Melle =

French football club

Melle
- Full name: Union Sportive Melloise
- Founded: 1937
- Dissolved: 2014
- Ground: Stade du Pinier, Melle
- Chairman: Jean-Michel Lagrede
Home colours

Union Sportive Melloise was a French association football team founded in 1937 under the name Jeunesse Ouvrière Sportive Melloise. The club changed to its current name in 1943.

The club was based in Melle, Deux-Sèvres, France and played at the Stade du Pinier.

The club was dissolved in July 2014.
