= Mickaël Ménétrier =

French footballer (born 1978)

Personal information
- Date of birth: 23 August 1978 (age 48)
- Place of birth: Reims, France
- Height: 1.91 m (6 ft 3 in)
- Position: Goalkeeper

Team information
- Current team: F91 Dudelange

Senior career*
Years	Team	Apps	(Gls)
1997–2000	Metz B	48	(0)
2000–2002	Bournemouth	13	(0)
2003–2004	Virton	14	(0)
2004–2007	Boulogne	79	(0)
2007–2008	AS Cherbourg	38	(0)
2008–2012	Istres	81	(0)
2012–	F91 Dudelange	5	(0)
- * Club domestic league appearances and goals as of 1 July 2014

Mickaël Ménétrier (born 23 August 1978) is a French professional football goalkeeper who currently plays for Luxembourg National Division side F91 Dudelange.
