= Daniel Smith (footballer, born 1982) =

English footballer

Personal information
- Date of birth: 17 August 1982 (age 44)
- Place of birth: Southampton, England
- Position: Defender

Senior career*
Years	Team	Apps	(Gls)
–1999	Bashley		
1999–2002	Bournemouth	18	(0)
2002–2004	Winchester City		
2004–2008	Eastleigh	92	(14)
2008	Bashley	27	(3)
2008–2009	Bognor Regis Town	39	(2)
2009–2012	Eastleigh	104	(5)
2012–2015	Gosport Borough	64	(3)
2015–2017	Winchester City		
- * Club domestic league appearances and goals

Daniel Smith (born 17 August 1982) is an English footballer who played in The Football League for Bournemouth and last played for Winchester City.
