= James Ford (footballer) =

English footballer

Personal information
- Date of birth: 23 October 1981 (age 45)
- Place of birth: Portsmouth, England
- Position: Midfielder

Senior career*
Years	Team	Apps	(Gls)
1999–2002	Bournemouth	12	(0)
1999	Dorchester Town (loan)		
2002–2005	Havant & Waterlooville	67	(1)
2003	→ Bognor Regis Town (loan)		
2006	Lymington & New Milton		
2008-2013	Gosport Borough	78	(1)
2013-2014	Fareham Town		
2013-2014	Moneyfields Fc		
2013- 2014	Winchester City		
- * Club domestic league appearances and goals as of 20:21, 30 September 2017 (UTC)

James Ford (born 23 October 1981) is an English footballer who played in The Football League for Bournemouth .

Away from his career in football, Ford is employed as business development manager at Southampton.
