= Jamie Day (footballer, born 1979) =

Footballer; football manager (born 1979)

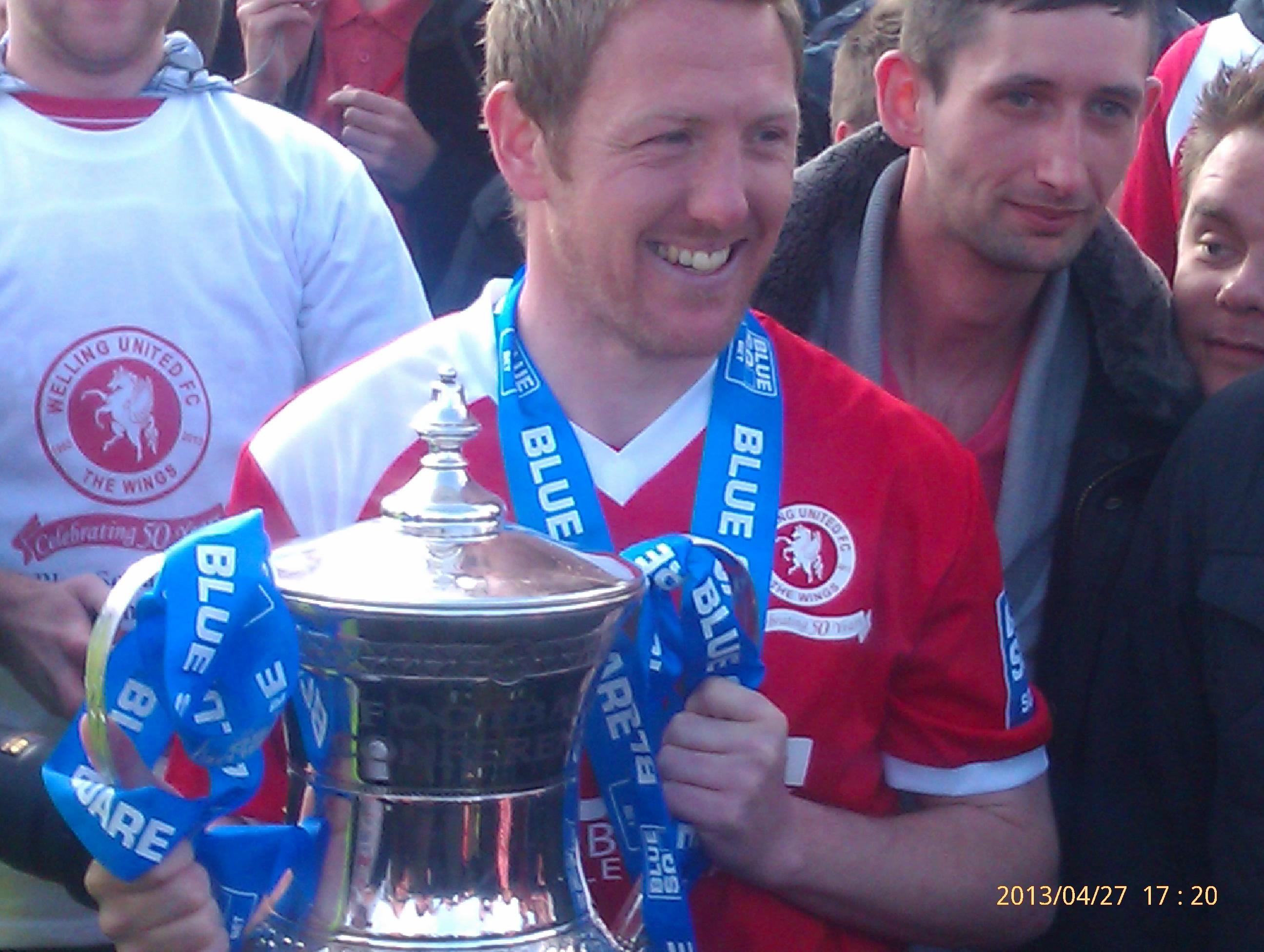

Personal information
- Full name: James Day
- Date of birth: 13 September 1979 (age 47)
- Place of birth: Bexley, London, England
- Position: Midfielder

Team information
- Current team: Charlton Athletic (Professional Development Phase Coach)

Youth career
- Arsenal

Senior career*
| Years | Team | Apps | (Gls) |
| 1997–1999 | Arsenal | 0 | (0) |
| 1999–2001 | AFC Bournemouth | 20 | (1) |
| 2001–2004 | Dover Athletic | 25 | (1) |
| 2004 | Crawley Town | 1 | (0) |
| 2004–2007 | Welling United | 89 | (12) |
| 2007–2008 | Grays Athletic | 7 | (1) |
| 2007 | → Eastbourne Borough (loan) | 0 | (0) |
| 2008 | → Havant & Waterlooville (loan) | | |
| 2008–2009 | Dartford | | |
| 2009–2014 | Welling United | 114 | (10) |
| 2014–2015 | Ebbsfleet United | 1 | (0) |
| 2017–2018 | Cray Valley Paper Mills | 8 | (1) |

International career
- England U16
- England U17
- England U18

Managerial career
- 2009–2014: Welling United
- 2014–2015: Ebbsfleet United
- 2016: Braintree Town
- 2016–2017: Welling United
- 2018–2022: Bangladesh U23
- 2018–2022: Bangladesh
Medal record
Representing Bangladesh (Manager)
Men's football
South Asian Games
| Bronze medal – third place | 2019 Nepal | Team |
- * Club domestic league appearances and goals as of 21:21, 2 May 2018 (UTC)

James "Jamie" Day (born 13 September 1979) is an English football manager, coach and former player. He is currently the Professional Development Phase Coach at Charlton Athletic.

Prior to his spell at Charlton, he was formerly the head coach of Bangladesh national football team and Bangladesh U23 side

== Playing career ==
Day began his playing career as a trainee at Arsenal where he earned a professional deal in 1998, although he failed to make a first team appearance, despite being named as a substitute in one first team fixture by Arsène Wenger .

He joined AFC Bournemouth for a fee of £20,000 in March 1999. He made his Bournemouth debut in April 1999 against Northampton Town. His first goal for the club came the following 1999-2000 season in a 2–0 away win against Cambridge United.

In the summer of 2001, he moved to Conference National side Dover Athletic. His first goal for the club came in a 2–1 loss against Hayes on 5 January 2002. At the end of the 2001-2002 season, Day couldn't prevent Dover's relegation from the division.

In November 2002, he was a part of the Dover side that reached the first round proper of the FA Cup, losing a first round tie against Football League club Oxford United.

He left the club in the summer of 2004 and joined Welling United. He remained at Welling until May 2007, when he returned to the Conference National, signing for Grays Athletic. He made his Grays Athletic debut on 18 August 2007 as a substitute in a 5–1 home win over Kidderminster Harriers. His first goal proved to be the winner on 3 November 2007 in a 1–0 away win over Salisbury City. He was sent out on loan to Conference South sides Eastbourne Borough and Havant & Waterlooville to gain further game time.

He left Grays in the summer of 2008, and secured a move to Dartford in August 2008.

== Managerial career ==
=== England ===
In November 2009, he returned to Welling United having been appointed as player-manager of the Conference South club at the age of 30. His start as manager at Park View Road was delayed however with Dartford claiming he was still registered to them as a player.

Despite being docked five points at the start of the 2010-11 season for financial misconduct, Day led Welling to sixth place in the Conference South, missing out on the play-off places by one point. In April 2011, he ruled out any rumours that he was set to return to his former club, Dartford, as their manager.

A third-place finish at the end of the 2011-12 season saw Day lead Welling to the Conference South play-off places. His side defeated Sutton United in the play-off semi-finals, subsequently earning a play-off final tie with Dartford, however Welling missed out on promotion, suffering a 1–0 defeat.

The following 2012-13 campaign however saw Day guide Welling to promotion to the Conference National as Conference South champions. After reaching the 60 point mark, he led Welling to a 16th-place finish in their first season back in the Conference National.

Following a five-year spell in charge at Welling, he left to return to the Conference South, being appointed manager of Ebbsfleet United in December 2014. In April 2015, however, he was relieved of his duties alongside his assistants Barry Ashby and Dean Frost.

On 11 May 2015, he was announced as the new assistant manager at Forest Green Rovers in a role that saw him link up with his former manager at Welling United, Adrian Pennock.

On 21 May 2016, Day was named manager of Braintree Town. He was sacked in September of the same year after only four months in charge. The following month he returned to Welling United, as first-team coach. In November 2016 he stepped up to replace Mark Goldberg as the manager. As first-team coach in second spell at Welling United he lost the first three matches against Ebbsfleet United, Hungerford Town and Hampton & Richmond. When Goldberg stepped aside he won all six of his matches in charge, in what marked his second spell as Welling manager. Day was undefeated in December 2016 and named as National League South Manager of the Month on 6 January 2017 - two days after leaving the club.

On 4 January 2017, Day left Welling to once again link-up with Adrian Pennock, this time at Gillingham.

Day left Gillingham in September 2017. In October 2017 he featured for Cray Valley Paper Mills as a player, scoring in a 2–1 win against Rochester United. On 12 February 2018 he reunited with Pennock once more, joining Barrow as assistant manager.

=== Bangladesh ===
On 17 May 2018, Bangladesh Football Federation announced that they have appointed Day as the head coach of Bangladesh national football team as well as the U-23. Under his guidance, Bangladesh put up its best performance ever in the 2018 Asian Games, where the team shocked by a 1–0 win over powerhouse Qatar and a draw to Thailand to reach the round of sixteen for the first time ever, which began to revive the past poupularity of football in Bangladesh. The team performed well in the 2018 SAFF Championship, Jamie Day was to keep his duty, where he coached Bangladesh U-23 team to have an acceptable third-place finish in the 2020 AFC U-23 Championship qualification, even though the team could not qualify, Bangladesh played good and only fell by minimal goal to Palestine and Bahrain.

Under Day's guidance, Bangladesh reached the third Round of 2023 AFC qualifiers, as one of the three best fifth-position teams. Day's long ball and counter-attacking tactics, were effective against lower ranked sides, although the team barely kept possession against better opposition. Nonetheless, Day's tactics did help Bangladesh earn hard fought draws against India and Afghanistan during the 2023 AFC Asian Cup and 2022 World Cup joint qualifiers Day also led the Bangladesh to qualification to the 2023 AFC Asian Cup qualification – third round as one of the three best fifth-positioned teams.

In September 2021, Bangladesh took part in the 2021 Three Nations Cup (Kyrgyzstan), the team lost both its games, conceding a total of six goals and only managing to score one. These results led to Day being "put on leave" just before the 2021 SAFF Championship, held in Maldives. To date, Day is the longest serving Bangladesh national team head coach.

=== Return to England ===
On 23 June 2022, Day was appointed assistant coach of League Two club Swindon Town. In January 2023, Day followed manager Scott Lindsey to join Crawley Town. In September 2024, he once again followed Lindsey, returning to League Two with Milton Keynes Dons.

On 25 September 2026, Day joined Charlton Athletic as its new Professional Development Phase Coach.

== Managerial statistics ==
As of match played 29 March 2022

| Team | From | To | Record | | | | | Ref |
| Team | From | To | G | W | D | L | Win % | Ref |
|---|---|---|---|---|---|---|---|---|
| Welling United | 8 November 2009 | 10 December 2014 | 250 | 122 | 71 | 57 | 48.80 | |
| Ebbsfleet United | 14 December 2014 | 21 April 2015 | 25 | 10 | 5 | 10 | 40.00 | |
| Braintree Town | 21 May 2016 | 25 September 2016 | 12 | 2 | 3 | 7 | 16.67 | |
| Welling United | 24 November 2016 | 5 January 2017 | 6 | 6 | 0 | 0 | 100.00 | |
| Bangladesh | 17 May 2018 | 15 Jan 2022 | 29 | 9 | 5 | 15 | 31.03 | |
| Bangladesh U23 | 17 May 2018 | 15 Jan 2022 | 10 | 3 | 2 | 5 | 30.00 | |
| Total | | | 340 | 155 | 90 | 95 | 45.59 | |

== Honours ==
Welling United

- Football Conference South: 2012–13

Bangladesh

- Mujib Borsho FIFA International Football Series: 2020
- South Asian Games bronze medalist: 2019
- Three Nations Cup runner-up: 2021
