= Willie Huck =

French footballer (born 1979)

Personal information
- Full name: William Huck
- Date of birth: 17 March 1979 (age 47)
- Place of birth: Paris, France
- Height: 1.78 m (5 ft 10 in)
- Position: Midfielder

Youth career
- 1997–1998: Monaco
- 1998–1999: Arsenal

Senior career*
| Years | Team | Apps | (Gls) |
| 1999–2002 | Bournemouth | 40 | (0) |
| 2002–2005 | Angers | 52 | (3) |
| 2006–2007 | Montluçon | | |
| 2007–2008 | Toulon | | |
| 2008–2010 | Vendée Poiré sur Vie | | |
| 2011–2012 | JS Saint-Jean Beaulieu | | |
- * Club domestic league appearances and goals

William Huck (born 17 March 1979) is a French former professional footballer who played as a midfielder. He is the son of former French international player Jean-Noël Huck.

== Career ==
Moving from French side Monaco, Huck began his career as an apprentice at Arsenal, but he never made a league appearance for the Gunners. Huck signed for Bournemouth in 1999, and made 40 league appearances in three seasons. Huck scored twice during his spell at Bournemouth; once in a League Cup tie against Barnet and once in a Football League Trophy tie against Dover Athletic. He later returned to France with Angers, where he played 52 matches. He then played for Montluçon, Toulon and now plays for Vendée Poiré sur Vie.
