= 2012–13 Portsmouth F.C. season =

Portsmouth F.C.
2012–13 season
- Chairman: Under Administration (until 10 April); Pompey Supporters Trust (PST) (since 19 April)
- Manager: Michael Appleton (until 8 November); Guy Whittingham (since 8 November)
- Stadium: Fratton Park
- League One: 24th (relegated)
- FA Cup: First round
- League Cup: First round
- League Trophy: Second round
- Top goalscorer: League: Izale McLeod (10); All: Izale McLeod (11)
- Highest home attendance: 18,433 vs. Sheffield United (20 April 2013)
- Lowest home attendance: 9,815 vs. MK Dons (26 February 2013)
- Average home league attendance: 14,124
Home colours	Away colours	Third colours

The 2012–13 season was Portsmouth's first season in League One. This was the first time that Portsmouth had played in the third tier of English football since the 1982–83 season. Portsmouth were relegated to League Two on 16 April 2013, following Oldham Athletic's win over Yeovil Town.

== Players ==
=== Squad details ===
As of 26 April 2013

No.	Name	Nat.	Place of birth	Date of birth	Club apps.	Club goals	Int. caps	Int. goals	Previous club	Date joined	Fee	End
1	Phil Smith	(England)	Harrow	14 December 1979	0	0	–	–	Swindon Town	7 December 2012	Free	2013
4	Sam Sodje	(Nigeria)	Greenwich (England)	25 May 1979	9	0	7	0	Notts County	24 January 2013	Free	2013
6	Liam Walker	(Gibraltar)	Gibraltar	13 April 1988	28	2	10	5	San Roque (Spain)	16 August 2012	Free	2013
9	David Connolly	(Republic of Ireland)	Willesden (England)	6 June 1977	17	7	41	9	Southampton	31 December 2012	Free	2013
10	Yassin Moutaouakil	(France)	Nice	18 July 1986	19	0	–	–	Hayes & Yeading	24 January 2013	Free	2013
13	Simon Eastwood	(England)	Luton	26 June 1989	30	0	–	–	FC Halifax Town	13 August 2012	Free	2013
16	Gábor Gyepes	(Hungary)	Budapest	26 June 1981	37	4	26	1	Vasas (Hungary)	7 September 2012	Free	2013
18	Johannes Ertl	(Austria)	Graz	13 November 1982	39	0	7	0	Sheffield United	31 August 2012	Free	2013
20	John Akinde	(England)	Camberwell	8 July 1989	11	0	–	–	Crawley	31 January 2013	Free	2013
21	Ashley Harris	(England)	Waterlooville	9 December 1993	34	3	–	–	Academy	15 July 2010	Trainee	2013
22	Adam Webster	(England)	West Wittering	4 January 1995	24	0	–	–	Academy	9 February 2011	Trainee	2013
24	Nick Awford	(England)	Portsmouth	15 April 1995	1	0	–	–	Academy	9 February 2011	Trainee	2013
30	Jack Whatmough^{1}	(England)	Gosport	24 June 1996	–	–	–	–	Academy	6 July 2012	Trainee	2014
31	Jack Maloney	(England)	Ryde	8 December 1994	10	0	–	–	Academy	9 February 2011	Trainee	2013
32	Bradley Tarbuck^{1}	(England)	Emsworth	6 November 1995	1	0	–	–	Academy	6 July 2012	Trainee	2014
33	Ricardo Rocha	(Portugal)	Santo Tirso	3 October 1978	97	0	6	0	Standard Liège	1 February 2010	Free	2013
34	Dan Butler	(England)	Cowes	26 August 1994	18	0	–	–	Academy	15 July 2010	Trainee	2013
35	Jed Wallace	(England)	Reading	26 March 1994	23	6	–	–	Lewes	30 August 2011	Free	2014
36	Dan Thompson^{1}	(England)	Wandsworth	4 July 1994	1	0	–	–	Hampton & Richmond	6 January 2012	Free	2013
37	George Colson^{1}	(Wales)	Cowes (England)	24 October 1993	1	0	–	–	Academy	15 July 2010	Trainee	2013
38	Alex Grant^{1}	(Australia)	Manchester (England)	23 January 1994	1	0	–	–	Academy	15 July 2010	Trainee	2013
41	Elliot Wheeler^{1}	(England)	Newport	19 December 1993	–	–	–	–	Academy	15 July 2010	Trainee	2013

^{1} Not in first team squad, but appeared at least on the bench in a first team game.

=== Transfers ===
==== In ====
No.	Pos.	Nat.	Name	Age	EU	Moving from	Type	Transfer window	Ends	Transfer fee	Source
38	DF	(Australia)	Alex Grant	18	EU	Youth system	Promoted ✓	Summer	2013	Youth system	
34	DF	(England)	Dan Butler	17	EU	Youth system	Promoted ✓	Summer	2013	Youth system	
33	DF	(England)	Sam Magri	18	EU	Youth system	Promoted ✓	Summer	2013	Youth system	
41	DF	(England)	Elliot Wheeler	18	EU	Youth system	Promoted ✓	Summer	2013	Youth system	
35	MF	(England)	Jed Wallace	18	EU	Youth system	Promoted ✓	Summer	2014	Youth system	
37	MF	(Wales)	George Colson	18	EU	Youth system	Promoted ✓	Summer	2013	Youth system	
36	MF	(England)	Dan Thompson	17	EU	Youth system	Loan Expiry ✓	Summer	2013	Youth system	
39	MF	(Australia)	Andy Higgins	18	EU	Youth system	Promoted ✓	Summer	2013	Youth system	
13	GK	(England)	Simon Eastwood	23	EU	Free agent	Transfer ✓	Summer	2012	Free	
40	DF	(England)	Ashley Westwood	35	EU	Lincoln City	Job Offer ✓	Summer	2013	Free	
—		(England)	Luke Dowling		EU	Crystal Palace	Job Offer ✓	Summer	2013	Free	
11	MF	(England)	Jack Compton	23	EU	Free agent	Transfer ✓	Summer	2012	Free	
2	DF	(Sierra Leone)	Mustapha Dumbuya	24	EU	Free agent	Transfer ✓	Summer	2012	Free	
7	MF	(Jamaica)	Lee Williamson	30	EU	Free agent	Transfer ✓	Summer	2012	Free	
3	DF	(England)	Jon Harley	32	EU	Free agent	Transfer ✓	Summer	2012	Free	
10	FW	(England)	Luke Rodgers	30	EU	Free agent	Transfer ✓	Summer	2012	Free	
8	MF	(England)	Brian Howard	29	EU	Free agent	Transfer ✓	Summer	2012	Free	
9	FW	(England)	Izale McLeod	27	EU	Free agent	Transfer ✓	Summer	2012	Free	
6	MF	(Gibraltar)	Liam Walker	24	EU	Free agent	Transfer ✓	Summer	2012	Free	
23	MF	(England)	Kieran Djilali	21	EU	Free agent	Transfer ✓	Summer	2012	Free	
17	MF	(Republic of Ireland)	Conor Clifford	20	EU	Chelsea	Loan ✓	Summer	2012	Free	
1	GK	(Denmark)	Mikkel Andersen	23	EU	Reading	Loan ✓	Summer	2012	Free	
14	DF	(England)	Paul Connolly	28	EU	Leeds United	Loan ✓	Summer	2012	Free	
4	DF	(Republic of Ireland)	Kevin Long	22	EU	Burnley	Loan ✓	Summer	2012	Free	
15	MF	(England)	Jordan Obita	18	EU	Reading	Loan ✓	Summer	2012	Free	
18	DF	(Austria)	Johnny Ertl	29	EU	Free agent	Transfer ✓	Summer	2012	Free	
5	DF	(England)	Josh Thompson	21	EU	Celtic (Scotland)	Transfer ✓	Summer	2012	Free	
19	MF	(England)	Darel Russell	31	EU	Free agent	Transfer ✓	Summer	2012	Free	
16	DF	(Hungary)	Gábor Gyepes	31	EU	Free agent	Transfer ✓	Summer	2012	Free	
20	DF	(Slovakia)	Ľubomír Michalík	29	EU	Free agent	Transfer ✓	Summer	2012	Free	
14	FW	(England)	Wesley Thomas	25	EU	Bournemouth	Loan ✓	During Season	2012	Free	
17	MF	(Hungary)	Ákos Buzsáky	30	EU	Free agent	Transfer ✓	During Season	2012	Free	
15	DF	(England)	Carl Dickinson	25	EU	Watford	Loan ✓	During Season	2012	Free	
23	MF	(Scotland)	Scott Allan	20	EU	West Bromwich Albion	Loan ✓	During Season	2012	Free	
26	MF	(England)	Nathaniel Mendez-Laing	20	EU	Peterborough United	Loan ✓	During Season	2012	Free	
14	FW	(England)	Paul Benson	33	EU	Swindon Town	Loan ✓	During Season	2012	Free	
33	DF	(Portugal)	Ricardo Rocha	34	EU	Free agent	Transfer ✓	During Season	2012	Free	
35	MF	(England)	Jed Wallace	18	EU	Whitehawk	Loan Return ✓	During Season	2014	Free	
1	GK	(Australia)	Alex Cisak	23	EU	Oldham Athletic	Loan ✓	During Season	2012	Free	
17	FW	(England)	Jake Jervis	21	EU	Birmingham City	Loan ✓	During Season	2012	Free	
1	GK	(England)	Phil Smith	32	EU	Free agent	Transfer ✓	During Season	2013	Free	
35	MF	(England)	Jed Wallace	18	EU	Whitehawk	Loan Return ✓	During Season	2014	Free	
9	FW	(Republic of Ireland)	David Connolly	35	EU	Free agent	Transfer ✓	Winter	2013	Free	
35	MF	(England)	Dan Butler	18	EU	Havant & Waterlooville	Loan Return ✓	Winter	2014	Free	
17	FW	(England)	James Keene	27	EU	IF Elfsborg (Sweden)	Loan ✓	Winter	2013	Free	
14	MF	(Republic of Ireland)	Frankie Sutherland	19	EU	Queens Park Rangers	Loan ✓	Winter	2013	Free	
37	MF	(Wales)	George Colson	19	EU	Dorchester Town	Loan Return ✓	Winter	2013	Free	
36	FW	(England)	Dan Thompson	18	EU	Dorchester Town	Loan Return ✓	Winter	2013	Free	
38	DF	(Australia)	Alex Grant	18	EU	Eastleigh	Loan Return ✓	Winter	2013	Free	
3	DF	(England)	Shaun Cooper	29	EU	Crawley Town	Loan ✓	Winter	2013	Free	
4	DF	(Nigeria)	Sam Sodje	33	EU	Free agent	Transfer ✓	Winter	2013	Free	
10	DF	(France)	Yassin Moutaouakil	26	EU	Hayes & Yeading United	Transfer ✓	Winter	2013	Free	
7	MF	(England)	Adam Reed	21	EU	Sunderland	Loan ✓	Winter	2013	Free	
		(England)	Alan Knight	51	EU	Free agent	Job Offer ✓	Winter	2013	Free	
19	MF	(France)	Therry Racon	28	EU	Millwall	Loan ✓	During Season	2013	Free	
20	FW	(England)	John Akinde	23	EU	Free agent	Transfer ✓	During Season	2013	Free	
23	FW	(Ghana)	Patrick Agyemang	32	EU	Stevenage	Loan ✓	During Season	2013	Free	
41	MF	(England)	Elliot Wheeler	19	EU	Bashley	Loan Return ✓	During Season	2013	Free	
31	MF	(England)	Jack Maloney	18	EU	Youth system	Promoted ✓	During Season	2013	Free	
24	MF	(England)	Nick Awford	17	EU	Youth system	Promoted ✓	During Season	2013	Free	
37	MF	(Wales)	George Colson	19	EU	Bashley	Loan Return ✓	During Season	2013	Free	
36	FW	(England)	Dan Thompson	18	EU	Bognor Regis Town	Loan Return ✓	During Season	2013	Free	
38	DF	(Australia)	Alex Grant	19	EU	Havant & Waterlooville	Loan Return ✓	During Season	2013	Free	
41	MF	(England)	Elliot Wheeler	19	EU	Sutton United	Loan Return ✓	During Season	2013	Free	
—	DF	(England)	Joshua Warren	18	EU	Bognor Regis Town	Loan Return ✓	During Season	2013	Free	

Total spending: ▼£0

==== Trialists ====
No.	Pos.	Nat.	Name	Age	EU	Moving from	Type	Transfer window	Ends	Transfer fee	Source
—	GK	(England)	Simon Eastwood	23	EU	Free agent	Trial/Transfer ✓	Summer	Trial	Free	
—	GK	(England)	Laurie Walker	22	EU	Kettering Town	Trial ✗	Summer	Trial	Free	
—	DF	(Sierra Leone)	Mustapha Dumbuya	24	EU	Free agent	Trial/Transfer ✓	Summer	Trial	Free	
—	DF	(England)	Jon Harley	32	EU	Free agent	Trial/Transfer ✓	Summer	Trial	Free	
—	GK	(Slovenia)	Darjan Curanovič	26	EU	Triglav Kranj (Slovenia)	Trial ✗	Summer	Trial	Free	
—	FW	(England)	Luke Rodgers	30	EU	Free agent	Trial/Transfer ✓	Summer	Trial	Free	
—	MF	(England)	Brian Howard	29	EU	Free agent	Trial/Transfer ✓	Summer	Trial	Free	
—	MF	(England)	Simon Gillett	26	EU	Free agent	Trial ✗	Summer	Trial	Free	
—	MF	(Ghana)	Lloyd Sam	27	EU	Free agent	Trial ✗	Summer	Trial	Free	
—	FW	(England)	Izale McLeod	27	EU	Free agent	Trial/Transfer ✓	Summer	Trial	Free	
—	GK	(England)	David Preece	35	EU	Free agent	Trial ✗	Summer	Trial	Free	
—	DF	(Greece)	Sotiris Balafas	25	EU	Free agent	Trial ✗	Summer	Trial	Free	
—	MF	(Algeria)	Julien Lopez	20	EU	Free agent	Trial ✗	Summer	Trial	Free	
—	MF	(Gibraltar)	Liam Walker	24	EU	San Roque (Spain)	Trial/Transfer ✓	Summer	Trial	Free	
—	GK	(Gibraltar)	Jordan Perez	25	EU	Lincoln (Gibraltar)	Trial ✗	Summer	Trial	Free	
—	GK	(England)	Glenn Morris	28	EU	Free agent	Trial ✗	Summer	Trial	Free	
—	DF	(England)	Josh Thompson	21	EU	Celtic (Scotland)	Trial/Transfer ✓	Summer	Trial	Free	
—	DF	(Albania)	Agonit Sallaj	20	EU	Neuchâtel Xamax (Switzerland)	Trial ✗	Summer	Trial	Free	
—	MF	(England)	Kieran Djilali	21	EU	Free agent	Trial/Transfer ✓	Summer	Trial	Free	
—	MF	(England)	Jack Compton	23	EU	Free agent	Trial/Transfer ✓	Summer	Trial	Free	
—	MF	(Republic of Ireland)	Conor Clifford	20	EU	Chelsea	Trial/Transfer ✓	Summer	Trial	Free	
—	GK	(Canada)	Jordan Santiago	21	EU	Free agent	Trial ✗	Summer	Trial	Free	
—	DF	(England)	Jerel Ifil	30	EU	Kettering Town	Trial ✗	Summer	Trial	Free	
—	MF	(England)	Tom Soares	26	EU	Free agent	Trial ✗	Summer	Trial	Free	
—	DF	(Austria)	Johnny Ertl	29	EU	Free agent	Trial/Transfer ✓	Summer	Trial	Free	
—	DF	(Iceland)	Hermann Hreiðarsson	38	EU	Free agent	Trial ✗	Summer	Trial	Free	
—	MF	(Portugal)	Luís Boa Morte	35	EU	Free agent	Trial ✗	During Season	Trial	Free	
—	MF	(Hungary)	Ákos Buzsáky	30	EU	Free agent	Trial/Transfer ✓	During Season	Trial	Free	
—	MF	(England)	Martin Devaney	32	EU	Free agent	Trial ✗	During Season	Trial	Free	
—	GK	(England)	Phil Smith	32	EU	Free agent	Trial/Transfer ✓	During Season	Trial	Free	
—	FW	(Republic of Ireland)	David Connolly	35	EU	Free agent	Trial/Transfer ✓	During Season	Trial	Free	
—	FW	(England)	James Keene	27	EU	IF Elfsborg (Sweden)	Trial/Transfer ✓	Winter	Trial	Free	
—	FW	(Zimbabwe)	Benjani	34	EU	Free agent	Trial ✗	Winter	Trial	Free	
—	DF	(Nigeria)	Sam Sodje	33	EU	Free agent	Trial/Transfer ✓	Winter	Trial	Free	
—	MF	(France)	Alassane N'Diaye	23	EU	Free agent	Trial ✗	During Season	Trial	Free	

==== Out ====
No.	Pos.	Nat.	Name	Age	EU	Moving to	Type	Transfer window	Transfer fee	Source
5	DF	(England)	Jason Pearce	24	EU	Leeds United	Transfer ✓	Summer	£500,000	
—	GK	(Republic of Ireland)	Matthew Gledhill	18	EU	Stoke City	Contract Ended ✓	Summer	Free	
—	DF	(England)	Lewis Tallack	19	EU	Nike Academy	Contract Ended ✓	Summer	Free	
—	MF	(England)	Lewis Stockford	19	EU	Bognor Regis Town	Contract Ended ✓	Summer	Free	
—	FW	(Republic of Ireland)	Carl Walshe	19	EU	Bognor Regis Town	Contract Ended ✓	Summer	Free	
—	FW	(England)	James Jennings	18	EU	Free agent	Contract Ended ✓	Summer	Free	
13	GK	(Republic of Ireland)	Stephen Henderson	24	EU	West Ham United	Transfer ✓	Summer	£600,000^{1}	
1	GK	(England)	Jamie Ashdown	31	EU	Leeds United	Contract Ended ✓	Summer	Free	
25	FW	(Zimbabwe)	Benjani	33	EU	Chippa United (South Africa)	Contract Ended ✓	Summer	Free	
3	DF	(Portugal)	Ricardo Rocha	33	EU	Portsmouth	Contract Ended ✓	Summer	Free	
2	MF	(England)	Joel Ward	22	EU	Crystal Palace	Transfer ✓	Summer	£400,000	
14	MF	(Nigeria)	Kelvin Etuhu	24	EU	Barnsley	Contract Ended ✓	Summer	Free	
8	MF	(England)	Hayden Mullins	33	EU	Birmingham City	Contract Ended ✓	Summer	Free	
4	DF	(South Africa)	Aaron Mokoena	31	EU	Bidvest Wits (South Africa)	Contract Terminated ✓	Summer	Free	
9	FW	(Hungary)	Márkó Futács	21	EU	Leicester City	Contract Ended ✓	Summer	Compensation	
11	FW	(England)	Luke Varney	29	EU	Leeds United	Transfer ✓	Summer	£300,000	
19	MF	(England)	David Norris	31	EU	Leeds United	Transfer ✓	Summer	£250,000^{2}	
15	DF	(England)	Greg Halford	27	EU	Nottingham Forest	Transfer ✓	Summer	Undisclosed	
10	FW	(Norway)	Erik Huseklepp	27	EU	Brann (Norway)	Transfer ✓	Summer	£200,000^{3}	
27	FW	(Nigeria)	Nwankwo Kanu	35	EU	Free agent	Contract Terminated ✓	Summer	Free	
18	FW	(England)	Dave Kitson	32	EU	Sheffield United	Contract Terminated ✓	Summer	Free	
26	DF	(Israel)	Tal Ben Haim	30	EU	Queens Park Rangers	Contract Terminated ✓	Summer	Free	
7	MF	(Republic of Ireland)	Liam Lawrence	30	EU	PAOK (Greece)	Contract Terminated ✓	Summer	Free	
23	MF	(England)	Kieran Djilali	21	EU	Sligo Rovers (Republic of Ireland)	Contract Terminated ✓	Summer	Free	
33	DF	(England)	Sam Magri	18	EU	Queens Park Rangers	Transfer ✓	Summer	Free	
14	DF	(England)	Paul Connolly	28	EU	Leeds United	Loan Return ✓	During Season	Free	
17	MF	(Republic of Ireland)	Conor Clifford	20	EU	Chelsea	Loan Return ✓	During Season	Free	
4	DF	(Republic of Ireland)	Kevin Long	22	EU	Burnley	Loan Return ✓	During Season	Free	
—	FW	(Australia)	Patrick Antelmi	18	EU	Leeds United	Transfer ✓	During Season	Free	
35	MF	(England)	Jed Wallace	18	EU	Whitehawk	Loan ✓	During Season	Free	
15	MF	(England)	Jordan Obita	18	EU	Reading	Loan Return ✓	During Season	Free	
14	FW	(England)	Wes Thomas	25	EU	Bournemouth	Loan Return ✓	During Season	Free	
34	DF	(England)	Dan Butler	18	EU	Havant & Waterlooville	Loan ✓	During Season	Free	
41	DF	(England)	Elliot Wheeler	18	EU	Bashley	Loan ✓	During Season	Free	
		(England)	Michael Appleton	36	EU	Blackpool	Job Offer ✓	During Season	Compensation	
40	DF	(England)	Ashley Westwood	36	EU	Blackpool	Job Offer ✓	During Season	Free	
10	FW	(England)	Luke Rodgers	30	EU	Free agent	Loan ✓	During Season	Free	
5	DF	(England)	Josh Thompson	21	EU	Colchester United	Loan ✓	During Season	Free	
15	DF	(England)	Carl Dickinson	25	EU	Watford	Loan Return ✓	During Season	Free	
39	MF	(Australia)	Andy Higgins	19	EU	Perth Glory (Australia)	Contract Terminated ✓	During Season	Free	
1	GK	(Denmark)	Mikkel Andersen	23	EU	Reading	Loan Return ✓	During Season	Free	
17	MF	(Hungary)	Ákos Buzsáky	30	EU	Barnsley	Loan ✓	During Season	Free	
36	FW	(England)	Dan Thompson	18	EU	Dorchester Town	Loan ✓	During Season	Free	
37	MF	(Wales)	George Colson	19	EU	Dorchester Town	Loan ✓	During Season	Free	
35	MF	(England)	Jed Wallace	18	EU	Whitehawk	Loan ✓	During Season	Free	
1	GK	(Australia)	Alex Cisak	23	EU	Oldham Athletic	Loan Return ✓	During Season	Free	
38	DF	(Australia)	Alex Grant	18	EU	Eastleigh	Loan ✓	During Season	Free	
17	FW	(England)	Jake Jervis	21	EU	Birmingham	Loan Return ✓	During Season	Free	
9	FW	(England)	Izale McLeod	28	EU	MK Dons	Contract Terminated ✓	During Season	Free	
5	DF	(England)	Josh Thompson	21	EU	Colchester United	Transfer ✓	Winter	Free	
11	MF	(England)	Jack Compton	24	EU	Colchester United	Transfer ✓	Winter	Free	
17	MF	(Hungary)	Ákos Buzsáky	30	EU	Free agent	Contract Ended ✓	Winter	Free	
23	MF	(Scotland)	Scott Allan	21	EU	West Bromwich Albion	Loan Return ✓	Winter	Free	
26	MF	(England)	Nathaniel Mendez-Laing	20	EU	Peterborough United	Loan Return ✓	Winter	Free	
10	FW	(England)	Luke Rodgers	31	EU	Free agent	Contract Ended ✓	Winter	Free	
20	DF	(Slovakia)	Ľubomír Michalík	29	EU	Kairat (Kazakhstan)	Contract Ended ✓	Winter	Free	
2	DF	(Sierra Leone)	Mustapha Dumbuya	25	EU	Crawley Town	Contract Ended ✓	Winter	Free	
3	DF	(England)	Jon Harley	33	EU	Maidstone United	Contract Ended ✓	Winter	Free	
7	MF	(Jamaica)	Lee Williamson	30	EU	Blackburn Rovers	Contract Ended ✓	Winter	Free	
8	MF	(England)	Brian Howard	29	EU	Bristol City	Contract Ended ✓	Winter	Free	
36	FW	(England)	Dan Thompson	18	EU	Bognor Regis Town	Loan ✓	Winter	Free	
—		(England)	Luke Dowling		EU	Blackburn Rovers	Job Offer ✓	Winter	Compensation	
—		(England)	John Keeley	51	EU	Blackburn Rovers	Job Offer ✓	Winter	Compensation	
—		(England)	Chris Neville	40	EU	Blackburn Rovers	Job Offer ✓	Winter	Compensation	
37	MF	(Wales)	George Colson	19	EU	Bashley	Loan ✓	Winter	Free	
38	DF	(Australia)	Alex Grant	19	EU	Havant & Waterlooville	Loan ✓	Winter	Free	
19	MF	(England)	Darel Russell	32	EU	Toronto FC (Canada)	Contract Ended ✓	Winter	Free	
14	MF	(Republic of Ireland)	Frankie Sutherland	19	EU	Queens Park Rangers	Loan Return ✓	During Season	Free	
17	FW	(England)	James Keene	27	EU	IF Elfsborg (Sweden)	Loan Return ✓	During Season	Free	
7	MF	(England)	Adam Reed	21	EU	Sunderland	Loan Return ✓	During Season	Free	
—	DF	(England)	Joshua Warren	18	EU	Bognor Regis Town	Loan ✓	During Season	Free	
37	MF	(Wales)	George Colson	19	EU	Stoke City	Trial	During Season	Free	
41	MF	(England)	Elliot Wheeler	19	EU	Sutton United	Loan ✓	During Season	Free	
3	DF	(England)	Shaun Cooper	29	EU	Crawley Town	Loan Return ✓	During Season	Free	
19	MF	(France)	Therry Racon	28	EU	Millwall	Loan Return ✓	During Season	Free	
23	FW	(Ghana)	Patrick Agyemang	32	EU	Stevenage	Loan Return ✓	During Season	Free	

Total gaining: ▲£2,250,000

Notes

^{1}Although officially undisclosed, the Portsmouth News reported the fee to be £600,000.

^{2}Although officially a free transfer, the Yorkshire Evening Post reported the fee to be £250,000.

^{3}Although officially undisclosed, the Portsmouth News reported the fee to be £200,000.

== Key events ==
- 28 April: After the last game of the season, Portsmouth manager Michael Appleton says that "17 or 18 players could be leaving the club and the same number coming in" in this summer.
- 4 May: Jason Pearce is sold to Leeds United for a £500,000 fee.
- 18 May: Balram Chainrai's Portpin propose terms for a CVA that would enable Pompey to come out of administration.
- 21 May: West Ham United buy Stephen Henderson after a successful loan spell in the club, for a rumoured £600,000 fee.
- 28 May: Portsmouth sell Joel Ward to Crystal Palace for a £400,000 fee.
- 9 June: Kelvin Etuhu leaves Portsmouth to join Barnsley.
- 3 July: Professional Footballers' Association chief executive Gordon Taylor says Portsmouth's players must reach a compromise on wages to save the club.
- 9 July: Portsmouth announces four players on trial: Jon Harley, Mustapha Dumbuya, Simon Eastwood and Laurie Walker.
- 12 July: Birmingham City bring in Hayden Mullins.
- 12 July: Aaron Mokoena agrees his departure from Pompey.
- 12 July: Portsmouth have been told by the Football League they will start the new season on −10 points if they are to be allowed into League One.
- 12 July: The Pompey Supporters Trust says its bid to buy Portsmouth is 'ongoing' and has welcomed news land surrounding Fratton Park could be up for sale.
- 13 July: Balram Chainrai's Portpin withdraw his bid.
- 14 July: Márkó Futács refused Portsmouth's new contract and signed with Leicester City, with Pompey receiving compensation.
- 16 July: Portsmouth announces five more trialists: Luke Rodgers, Brian Howard, Simon Gillett, Lloyd Sam and Izale McLeod.
- 18 July: Portsmouth announces three more trialists: David Preece, Julien Lopez and Sotiris Balafas.
- 24 July: Gibraltarian midfielder Liam Walker joins Portsmouth on trial.
- 24 July: Leeds United signs Luke Varney for a £300,000 fee.
- 24 July: Administrator Trevor Birch confirmed that Portsmouth will close on 10 August unless highest earners agree transfer cuts.
- 25 July: Pompey Supporters Trust has stated it is ready to buy the club, but it can only do so if the high earners leave the club.
- 26 July: Leeds United signs David Norris.
- 27 July: Nottingham Forest signs Greg Halford.
- 28 July: Flamboyant winger Erik Huseklepp agreed a move back to his homeland, signing a four-and-a-half deal with SK Brann.
- 30 July: Portsmouth legend Nwankwo Kanu agrees a contract termination with the club.
- 3 August: Dave Kitson agrees a contract termination with the club.
- 9 August: Tal Ben Haim is released by Portsmouth, after cancelling the remaining year of his contract.
- 10 August: Liam Lawrence leaves the club.
- 11 August: Two more trialists join Portsmouth: Jerel Ifil and Jordan Santiago.
- 11 September: Former Portsmouth owner Sulaiman Al-Fahim starts negotiations to become the third bidder to try and purchase the club.
- 18 September: Former Watford owner Lawrance Bassani submits a bid to try to buy the club, becoming the fourth bidder in the ownership saga.
- 19 September: A Fifth bidder has emerged, named as the firm Portco Ltd, fronted by Harry Kerr. But there is still no more news concerning the other 4 bidders yet.
- 18 October: Portsmouth's administrator Trevor Birch announced that he nominated Portsmouth Supporters' Trust as the preferred bidder for the club.
- 7 November: Michael Appleton leaves club to manage Blackpool, along with first team coach Ashley Westwood. Guy Whittingham is appointed as caretaker manager.
- 9 November: Balram Chainrai suspends his Portsmouth bid.
- 15 November: Portsmouth Supporters' Trust reaches an agreement with PFK to buy the club.
- 21 November: PFK and Balram Chainrai will decide the value of Fratton Park in High Court on 13–14 December.
- 12 December: Portsmouth's administrators ask to adjourn the Court case.
- 14 December: Court case is adjourned until 15 January.
- 5 January: Portsmouth announces that will leave Eastleigh training ground at the end of the month.
- 14 January: Court case is adjourned again, until 31 January.
- 17 January: Luke Dowling (head of recruitment) and John Keeley (goalkeeper coach) join Blackburn Rovers.
- 21 January: Chris Neville (Strength and conditioning coach) signs for Blackburn Rovers.
- 25 January: Alan Knight is announced as new goalkeeping coach until the end of the season.
- 30 January: Court Case is adjourned to 14 February.
- 9 February: Portsmouth equalled its worst run in the club's history with nine defeats in a row and 19 games without a win.
- 12 February: Portsmouth set a new record in the club's history, after being twenty games without a win.
- 20 February: Court Case is set to go ahead after four adjournments.
- 21 February: Court Case is set a 19 April deadline.
- 27 February: Portsmouth Council finalises PST loan deal.
- 28 February: Stuart Robinson, who is working with Portsmouth Supporters' Trust, seals Fratton Park land deal.
- 2 March: Portsmouth end a run of 23-games without a win after a 2–1 victory against Crewe.
- 5 March: A date is set for the High Court hearing: 10 or 11 April.
- 8 March: Pompey Supporters Trust exchanges contract with administrators to buy Portsmouth.
- 5 April: Portsmouth completes 115 years of existence.
- 9 April: Court Case is confirmed to 10 April, and will begin at 10.30am.
- 10 April: A deal is agreed for PST to buy Portsmouth.
- 10 April: PST's chairman, Ashley Brown, released a statement saying that they "have a lot of people to thank", and that "now the next chapter of hard work begins to transform our club into something the community of Portsmouth can be proud of – both on and off the field."
- 16 April: Portsmouth is relegated to League Two after Oldham 1–0 victory over Yeovil.
- 19 April: Portsmouth Supporters' Trust finalises Portsmouth FC purchase.
- 20 April: Portsmouth suffers a 10-point deduction due to being out of administration.
- 20 April: Portsmouth Academy is declared 2012–13 Football League Youth Alliance champions.
- 24 April: Portsmouth appoint caretaker manager Guy Whittingham as full-time manager on a 1-year rolling contract.

== Player statistics ==
=== Squad stats ===
As of 27 April 2013

No.	Pos	Nat	Player	Total		League One		FA Cup		League Cup		League Trophy	
No.	Pos	Nat	Player	Apps	Goals	Apps	Goals	Apps	Goals	Apps	Goals	Apps	Goals
1	GK	(England) ENG	Phil Smith	0	0	0	0	0	0	0	0	0	0
3	MF	(England) ENG	Shaun Cooper	14	2	13+1	2	0	0	0	0	0	0
4	DF	(Nigeria) NGR	Sam Sodje	9	0	9	0	0	0	0	0	0	0
6	MF	(Gibraltar) GIB	Liam Walker	28	2	16+10	2	0+1	0	0	0	0+1	0
9	FW	(Republic of Ireland) IRL	David Connolly	17	7	15+2	7	0	0	0	0	0	0
10	DF	(France) FRA	Yassin Moutaouakil	19	0	17+2	0	0	0	0	0	0	0
13	GK	(England) ENG	Simon Eastwood	30	0	27	0	1	0	1	0	1	0
16	DF	(Hungary) HUN	Gábor Gyepes	37	4	34+1	4	1	0	0	0	1	0
18	MF	(Austria) AUT	Johnny Ertl	39	0	33+4	0	1	0	0	0	1	0
19	MF	(Guadeloupe) GLP	Therry Racon	16	0	16	0	0	0	0	0	0	0
20	FW	(England) ENG	John Akinde	11	0	3+8	0	0	0	0	0	0	0
21	FW	(England) ENG	Ashley Harris	29	3	7+19	3	0	0	1	0	1+1	0
22	DF	(England) ENG	Adam Webster	21	0	10+8	0	1	0	1	0	1	0
23	FW	(Ghana) GHA	Patrick Agyemang	15	3	15	3	0	0	0	0	0	0
24	MF	(England) ENG	Nick Awford	1	0	0+1	0	0	0	0	0	0	0
30	DF	(England) ENG	Jack Whatmough	0	0	0	0	0	0	0	0	0	0
31	MF	(England) ENG	Jack Maloney	10	0	1+8	0	0	0	0+1	0	0	0
32	MF	(England) ENG	Bradley Tarbuck	1	0	0	0	0	0	0+1	0	0	0
33	DF	(Portugal) POR	Ricardo Rocha	21	0	19+2	0	0	0	0	0	0	0
34	DF	(England) ENG	Dan Butler	18	0	15+2	0	0	0	1	0	0	0
35	MF	(England) ENG	Jed Wallace	23	6	19+3	6	0	0	1	0	0	0
37	MF	(Wales) WAL	George Colson	1	0	0	0	0	0	1	0	0	0
Players on loan to other clubs:
36	FW	(England) ENG	Dan Thompson	1	0	0	0	0	0	1	0	0	0
38	DF	(Australia) AUS	Alex Grant	1	0	0	0	0	0	1	0	0	0
41	DF	(England) ENG	Elliot Wheeler	0	0	0	0	0	0	0	0	0	0
Players who have left the club after the start of the season:
1	GK	(Denmark) DEN	Mikkel Andersen	19	0	18	0	0	0	0	0	1	0
1	GK	(Australia) AUS	Alex Cisak	1	0	1	0	0	0	0	0	0	0
2	DF	(Sierra Leone) SLE	Mustapha Dumbuya	26	0	23+1	0	1	0	0	0	1	0
3	DF	(England) ENG	Jon Harley	26	1	23	1	0+1	0	0	0	2	0
4	DF	(Republic of Ireland) IRL	Kevin Long	6	0	5	0	0	0	0	0	1	0
5	DF	(England) ENG	Josh Thompson	3	0	2	0	0	0	0	0	1	0
7	MF	(England) ENG	Lee Williamson	24	0	19+3	0	0	0	0	0	1+1	0
7	MF	(England) ENG	Adam Reed	10	0	5+5	0	0	0	0	0	0	0
8	MF	(England) ENG	Brian Howard	25	1	22	0	1	0	0	0	2	1
9	FW	(England) ENG	Izale McLeod	27	11	23+1	10	1	0	0	0	2	1
10	FW	(England) ENG	Luke Rodgers	13	3	6+4	2	1	0	0	0	1+1	1
11	MF	(England) ENG	Jack Compton	13	0	8+4	0	0+1	0	0	0	0	0
14	DF	(England) ENG	Paul Connolly	5	0	4	0	0	0	0	0	1	0
14	FW	(England) ENG	Wesley Thomas	7	3	6	3	0	0	0	0	1	0
14	FW	(England) ENG	Paul Benson	7	2	7	2	0	0	0	0	0	0
14	MF	(Republic of Ireland) IRL	Frankie Sutherland	1	0	0+1	0	0	0	0	0	0	0
15	MF	(England) ENG	Jordan Obita	8	1	2+6	1	0	0	0	0	0	0
15	DF	(England) ENG	Carl Dickinson	5	0	5	0	0	0	0	0	0	0
17	MF	(Republic of Ireland) IRL	Conor Clifford	3	1	0+2	1	0	0	0	0	0+1	0
17	MF	(Hungary) HUN	Ákos Buzsáky	8	0	5+1	0	1	0	0	0	1	0
17	FW	(England) ENG	Jake Jervis	3	1	1+2	1	0	0	0	0	0	0
17	FW	(England) ENG	James Keene	9	1	6+3	1	0	0	0	0	0	0
19	MF	(England) ENG	Darel Russell	18	0	17	0	0	0	0	0	1	0
20	DF	(Slovakia) SVK	Ľubomír Michalík	20	1	17+1	1	1	0	0	0	1	0
23	MF	(Scotland) SCO	Scott Allan	10	1	6+3	1	1	0	0	0	0	0
23	MF	(England) ENG	Kieran Djilali	1	0	1	0	0	0	0	0	0	0
26	MF	(England) ENG	Nathaniel Mendez-Laing	8	0	5+3	0	0	0	0	0	0	0
33	DF	(England) ENG	Sam Magri	1	0	0	0	0	0	1	0	0	0
39	MF	(Australia) AUS	Andy Higgins	1	0	0	0	0	0	1	0	0	0
40	DF	(England) ENG	Ashley Westwood	1	0	0	0	0	0	1	0	0	0

=== Top scorers ===
Place	Position	Nation	Number	Name	League One	FA Cup	League Cup	Paint Trophy	Total
1	FW	(England)	9	Izale McLeod	10	0	0	1	11
2	FW	(Republic of Ireland)	9	David Connolly	7	0	0	0	7
3	MF	(England)	35	Jed Wallace	6	0	0	0	6
4	DF	(Hungary)	16	Gábor Gyepes	4	0	0	0	4
5	FW	(England)	21	Ashley Harris	3	0	0	0	3
5	FW	(Ghana)	23	Patrick Agyemang	3	0	0	0	3
5	FW	(England)	14	Wesley Thomas	3	0	0	0	3
5	FW	(England)	10	Luke Rodgers	2	0	0	1	3
6	MF	(England)	3	Shaun Cooper	2	0	0	0	2
6	MF	(Gibraltar)	6	Liam Walker	2	0	0	0	2
6	FW	(England)	14	Paul Benson	2	0	0	0	2
7	DF	(Slovakia)	20	Ľubomír Michalík	1	0	0	0	1
7	MF	(England)	8	Brian Howard	0	0	0	1	1
7	MF	(England)	15	Jordan Obita	1	0	0	0	1
7	MF	(Republic of Ireland)	17	Conor Clifford	1	0	0	0	1
7	FW	(England)	17	Jake Jervis	1	0	0	0	1
7	FW	(England)	17	James Keene	1	0	0	0	1
7	MF	(Scotland)	23	Scott Allan	1	0	0	0	1
				TOTALS	51	0	0	3	54

=== Assists ===
According to BBC Sport match reports.

Place	Position	Nation	Number	Name	League One	FA Cup	League Cup	Paint Trophy	Total
1	MF	(England)	8	Brian Howard	6	0	0	0	6
2	MF	(England)	35	Jed Wallace	5	0	0	0	5
3	MF	(Gibraltar)	6	Liam Walker	3	0	0	0	3
3	FW	(Ghana)	23	Patrick Agyemang	3	0	0	0	3
3	DF	(England)	3	Jon Harley	3	0	0	0	3
4	FW	(Republic of Ireland)	9	David Connolly	2	0	0	0	2
4	MF	(Austria)	18	Johnny Ertl	2	0	0	0	2
4	FW	(England)	21	Ashley Harris	2	0	0	0	2
4	DF	(England)	22	Adam Webster	2	0	0	0	2
5	MF	(England)	3	Shaun Cooper	1	0	0	0	1
5	DF	(Guadeloupe)	10	Yassin Moutaouakil	1	0	0	0	1
5	FW	(England)	20	John Akinde	1	0	0	0	1
5	DF	(England)	34	Dan Butler	1	0	0	0	1
5	FW	(England)	9	Izale McLeod	1	0	0	0	1
5	FW	(England)	10	Luke Rodgers	1	0	0	0	1
5	MF	(England)	11	Jack Compton	1	0	0	0	1
5	FW	(England)	17	James Keene	1	0	0	0	1
5	MF	(Scotland)	23	Scott Allan	1	0	0	0	1
5	DF	(Sierra Leone)	2	Mustapha Dumbuya	0	0	0	1	1
				TOTALS	37	0	0	1	38

=== Disciplinary record ===
Number	Nation	Position	Name	League One		FA Cup		League Cup		Paint Trophy		Total	
Number	Nation	Position	Name	Yellow card	Red card	Yellow card	Red card	Yellow card	Red card	Yellow card	Red card	Yellow card	Red card
8	(England)	MF	Brian Howard	6	0	0	0	0	0	1	0	7	0
3	(England)	DF	Jon Harley	5	0	0	0	0	0	0	0	5	0
9	(England)	FW	Izale McLeod	5	0	0	0	0	0	0	0	5	0
15	(England)	DF	Carl Dickinson	4	0	0	0	0	0	0	0	4	0
20	(Slovakia)	DF	Ľubomír Michalík	4	0	0	0	0	0	0	0	4	0
33	(Portugal)	DF	Ricardo Rocha	4	0	0	0	0	0	0	0	4	0
16	(Hungary)	DF	Gábor Gyepes	3	0	1	0	0	0	0	0	4	0
18	(Austria)	DF	Johnny Ertl	3	0	0	0	0	0	0	0	3	0
19	(England)	MF	Darel Russell	3	0	0	0	0	0	0	0	3	0
4	(Nigeria)	DF	Sam Sodje	2	1	0	0	0	0	0	0	2	1
4	(Republic of Ireland)	DF	Kevin Long	1	1	0	0	0	0	1	0	2	1
7	(England)	MF	Adam Reed	2	0	0	0	0	0	0	0	2	0
7	(England)	MF	Lee Williamson	2	0	0	0	0	0	0	0	2	0
10	(France)	DF	Yassin Moutaouakil	2	0	0	0	0	0	0	0	2	0
14	(England)	DF	Paul Connolly	2	0	0	0	0	0	0	0	2	0
19	(Guadeloupe)	MF	Therry Racon	2	0	0	0	0	0	0	0	2	0
35	(England)	MF	Jed Wallace	2	0	0	0	0	0	0	0	2	0
17	(Hungary)	MF	Ákos Buzsáky	1	0	1	0	0	0	0	0	2	0
23	(Scotland)	MF	Scott Allan	0	0	1	1	0	0	0	0	1	1
15	(England)	MF	Jordan Obita	0	1	0	0	0	0	0	0	0	1
2	(Sierra Leone)	DF	Mustapha Dumbuya	1	0	0	0	0	0	0	0	1	0
10	(England)	FW	Luke Rodgers	1	0	0	0	0	0	0	0	1	0
11	(England)	MF	Jack Compton	1	0	0	0	0	0	0	0	1	0
13	(England)	GK	Simon Eastwood	1	0	0	0	0	0	0	0	1	0
14	(England)	FW	Paul Benson	1	0	0	0	0	0	0	0	1	0
14	(England)	FW	Wesley Thomas	1	0	0	0	0	0	0	0	1	0
6	(Gibraltar)	MF	Liam Walker	1	0	0	0	0	0	0	0	1	0
21	(England)	FW	Ashley Harris	1	0	0	0	0	0	0	0	1	0
22	(England)	DF	Adam Webster	1	0	0	0	0	0	0	0	1	0
31	(England)	MF	Jack Maloney	1	0	0	0	0	0	0	0	1	0
34	(England)	DF	Dan Butler	1	0	0	0	0	0	0	0	1	0
			TOTALS	63	3	3	1	0	0	2	0	68	4

== Competition ==
=== League One ===
Pos	Team	Pld	W	D	L	GF	GA	GD	Pts	Promotion, qualification or relegation
20	Colchester United	46	14	9	23	47	68	−21	51	
21	Scunthorpe United (R)	46	13	9	24	49	73	−24	48	Relegation to Football League Two
22	Bury (R)	46	9	14	23	45	73	−28	41	Relegation to Football League Two
23	Hartlepool United (R)	46	9	14	23	39	67	−28	41	Relegation to Football League Two
24	Portsmouth (R)	46	10	12	24	51	69	−18	32 (Note: On 20 April Portsmouth were deducted ten points after coming out of administration.)	Relegation to Football League Two

Updated to match(es) played on 27 April 2013. Source: BBC Sport
Rules for classification: 1) Points; 2) Goal difference; 3) Number of goals scored
(R) Relegated

==== Results summary ====
Overall								Home						Away					
Pld	W	D	L	GF	GA	GD	Pts	W	D	L	GF	GA	GD	W	D	L	GF	GA	GD
46	10	12	24	51	69	−18	42	7	5	11	27	27	0	3	7	13	24	42	−18

Last updated: 27 April 2013.
Source: BBC Sport

==== Results by round ====
Round	1	2	3	4	5	6	7	8	9	10	11	12	13	14	15	16	17	18	19	20	21	22	23	24	25	26	27	28	29	30	31	32	33	34	35	36	37	38	39	40	41	42	43	44	45	46
Ground	H	A	A	H	A	H	H	A	H	A	A	H	H	A	A	H	A	H	H	A	A	H	A	H	H	A	A	H	A	H	H	A	H	A	H	A	H	A	A	H	A	H	H	A	H	A
Result	D	D	L	L	W	L	L	L	W	W	D	W	W	L	L	L	L	L	L	D	D	D	D	L	L	L	L	L	L	L	L	L	D	L	D	W	W	L	D	W	D	W	D	L	W	L
Position	10	12	20	21	16	17	19	21	17	14	17	12	11	14	15	17	18	19	21	21	20	21	21	21	21	21	22	22	22	23	23	23	24	24	24	24	23	23	23	22	22	22	22	22	24	24

Updated to match(es) played on 27 April 2013. Source:
A = Away; H = Home; W = Win; D = Draw; L = Loss

==== Pre-season ====
14 July 2012	Havant & Waterlooville	P–P	Portsmouth	Havant
15:00 BST		Report		Stadium: West Leigh Park; Referee: Kriss
Note: Postponed due to a waterlogged pitch

20 July 2012	Gibraltar	4–0	Portsmouth	Gibraltar
19:00 BST	Cabrera 34'; Payas 39' (pen.); Lee Casciaro 66' 84'; Chipol (yellow card)	Report		Stadium: Victoria Stadium; Attendance: 1,400; Referee: Joseph Barcelo

24 July 2012	Brighton & Hove Albion	5–1	Portsmouth	Cádiz, Spain
17:00 BST	Hoskins 11'; Sparrow 25'; Vicente 34'; Vincelot 48'; Agdestein 63'	Report	45+' Thompson	Stadium: Barcello Montecastillo Resort

1 August 2012	Aldershot Town	0–1	Portsmouth	Aldershot
19:45 BST		Report	7' McLeod	Stadium: Recreation Ground; Attendance: 2,094; Referee: Tim Robinson

4 August 2012	Portsmouth	3–0	Bolton Wanderers	Portsmouth
15:00 BST	Djilali 6'; Lawrence 12'; Harris 53'	Report		Stadium: Fratton Park; Attendance: 4,193; Referee: Keith Stroud

8 August 2012	AFC Wimbledon	0–2	Portsmouth	London
19:45 BST			Rodgers 12'; Walker 23'	Stadium: Kingsmeadow

11 August 2012	Salisbury City	2–1	Portsmouth XI	Salisbury
15:00 BST	Sinclair 39'; McPhee 43'	Report	80' (pen.) Compton	Stadium: Raymond McEnhill Stadium; Attendance: 554; Referee: Richard Martin

=== Competitive ===
==== League One ====
18 August 2012 1	Portsmouth	1–1	AFC Bournemouth	Portsmouth
15:00 BST	McLeod 19'; Connolly (yellow card) 79'	Report	(yellow card) 58' O'Kane; 77' Barnard	Stadium: Fratton Park; Attendance: 17,703; Referee: Taylor

21 August 2012 2	Colchester United	2–2	Portsmouth	Essex
19:45 BST	Wilson (yellow card) 41'; Rose 45+2'; O'Toole (yellow card) 62'; Okuonghae 83'	Report	30' Rodgers; 85' Obita	Stadium: Colchester Community Stadium; Attendance: 4,335; Referee: Collins

25 August 2012 3	Carlisle United	4–2	Portsmouth	Carlisle
BST	Jervis 13'; Livesey 48'; Noble (yellow card) 55'; Robson (yellow card) 61'; McGovern (yellow card) 74'; Berrett 90+2'; Madden 90+6'	Report	(yellow card) 40' Harley; (red card) 84' Long; (yellow card) 88' Connolly; 90' Harris; 90+3' Clifford	Stadium: Brunton Park; Attendance: 5,120; Referee: Ilderton

1 September 2012 4	Portsmouth	0–1	Oldham Athletic	Portsmouth
15:00 BST	Obita (red card) 62'; Howard (yellow card) 73'	Report	(yellow card) 34' Mvoto; 59' (o.g.) Ertl; (red card) 64' Byrne; (yellow card) 74' Grounds; (yellow card) 78' Brown	Stadium: Fratton Park; Attendance: 12,635; Referee: Carl Berry

9 September 2012 5	Crawley Town	0–3	Portsmouth	Crawley
15:30 BST	Simpson (red card) 41'; Sadler (yellow card) 47'; Akpan (red card) 71'; Cooper (yellow card) 82'	Report	(yellow card) 43' Compton; (yellow card) 65' Howard; 74' (yellow card) 75' Harris; 83' Rodgers; 85' McLeod	Stadium: Broadfield Stadium; Attendance: 5,058; Referee: Deadman

15 September 2012 6	Portsmouth	1–2	Walsall	Portsmouth
15:00 BST	McLeod 69'	Report	56' Baxendale; 63' Cuvelier	Stadium: Fratton Park; Attendance: 11,767; Referee: Whitestone

18 September 2012 7	Portsmouth	1–2	Swindon Town	Portsmouth
20:00 BST	Michalík (yellow card) 73' (goal) 90+2'	Report	45' Ritchie; 55' Williams; (yellow card) 87' Devera	Stadium: Fratton Park; Attendance: 12,121; Referee: Rushton

22 September 2012 8	Notts County	3–2	Portsmouth	Nottingham
14:00 BST	Arquin 5' 57'; Judge 47'; Leacock (yellow card) 87'	Report	(yellow card) 88' Gyepes	Stadium: Meadow Lane; Attendance: 6,834; Referee: Geoff Eltrigham

29 September 2012 9	Portsmouth	2–1	Scunthorpe United	Portsmouth
15:00 BST	Gyepes 12'; Howard (penalty missed) 31'; Michalík (yellow card) 76'; Thomas 89'	Report	6' Clarke; (yellow card) 78' Prutton	Stadium: Fratton Park; Attendance: 10,995; Referee: D'Urso

2 October 2012 10	Yeovil Town	1–2	Portsmouth	Yeovil
15:45 BST	Reid 69' (pen.); B. Webster (yellow card) 77'; Leacock (yellow card) 87'; McAllister (yellow card) 87'; Burn (yellow card) 90+3'	Report	13' McLeod; 79' Gyepes	Stadium: Huish Park; Attendance: 4,769; Referee: Foy

6 October 2012 11	Milton Keynes Dons	2–2	Portsmouth	Milton Keynes
15:45 BST	Webster 40' (o.g.); Kay (yellow card) 41'; Potter 72'; Smith (yellow card) 90+3'	Report	(penalty missed) 2' Howard; 4' (yellow card) 78' McLeod; 20' Gyepes	Stadium: Stadium MK; Attendance: 10,409; Referee: Coote

13 October 2012 12	Portsmouth	2–0	Crewe Alexandra	Portsmouth
15:00 BST	Thomas 2'; McLeod 18' (pen.) (yellow card) 24'; Howard (yellow card) 27'; Buzsáky (yellow card) 38'; Michalík (yellow card) 38'; Harley (yellow card) 82'; Rodgers (yellow card) 90+1'	Report	(yellow card) 34' Mellor	Stadium: Fratton Park; Attendance: 11,829; Referee: Phillips

20 October 2012 13	Portsmouth	3–1	Shrewsbury Town	Portsmouth
15:00 BST	Thomas 55' (yellow card) 90+7'; McLeod 58' 90+4'	Report	(yellow card) 52' Hall; 61' (red card) 61' Morgan; (yellow card) 66' Hector; (yellow card) 68' Summerfield; (yellow card) 77' Gornell	Stadium: Fratton Park; Attendance: 13,051; Referee: Graham

23 October 2012 14	Stevenage	2–1	Portsmouth	Stevenage
13:45 BST	Morais 14' 61'; Tansey (yellow card) 54'	Report	51' Harley; (yellow card) 87' Dickinson	Stadium: Broadhall Way; Attendance: 4,012; Referee: Woolmer

29 October 2012 15	Sheffield United	1–0	Portsmouth	Sheffield
19:45 BST	Blackman 66' (pen.)	Report	(yellow card) 60' Dickinson	Stadium: Bramall Lane; Attendance: 18,946; Referee: Russell

6 November 2012 16	Portsmouth	0–1	Brentford	Portsmouth
20:45 BST	Harley (yellow card) 75'	Report	9' (yellow card) 81' Donaldson; (yellow card) 45+2' Forrester; (yellow card) 57' O'Connor; (yellow card) 77' Dean; (yellow card) 90+2' Lee	Stadium: Fratton Park; Attendance: 11,328; Referee: Mathieson

10 November 2012 17	Bury	2–0	Portsmouth	Bury
15:45 BST	Lockwood 19'; Schumacher 56' (pen.)	Report	(yellow card) 14' Dumbuya; (yellow card) 42' Russell; (yellow card) 55' Dickinson; (yellow card) 74' Ertl; (yellow card) 86' Howard	Stadium: Gigg Lane; Attendance: 3,280; Referee: Pawson

17 November 2012 18	Portsmouth	0–1	Doncaster Rovers	Portsmouth
15:00 BST	Williamson (yellow card) 34'; Russell (yellow card) 50'; Howard (yellow card) 62'; Dickinson (yellow card) 81'; Benson (yellow card) 85'	Report	25' Hume; (yellow card) 55' Keegan; (yellow card) 90+4' Woods	Stadium: Fratton Park; Attendance: 11,792; Referee: Williamson

20 November 2012 19	Portsmouth	2–3	Leyton Orient	Portsmouth
19:45 BST	McLeod (penalty missed) 27' 57' (pen.); Allan 65'	ReportReport	(yellow card) 22' Clarke; 32' 62' Lisbie; 51' Odubajo; (yellow card) 69' Cook; (yellow card) 87' Baudry	Stadium: Fratton Park; Attendance: 9,955; Referee: Scott

24 November 2012 20	Coventry City	1–1	Portsmouth	Coventry
15:00 BST	McSheffrey 41'; Edjenguélé (yellow card) 55'	Report	(yellow card) 33' Harley; (yellow card) 60' Howard; 90+3' McLeod	Stadium: Ricoh Arena; Attendance: 11,295; Referee: Salisbury

8 December 2012 21	Tranmere Rovers	2–2	Portsmouth	Tranmere
15:00 BST	Taylor 31'; O'Halloran 74'	Report	(yellow card) 30' McLeod; 50' Gyepes; 75' Jervis; (yellow card) 81' Russell; (yellow card) 90+1' Williamson	Stadium: Prenton Park; Attendance: 5,591; Referee: Webb

15 December 2012 22	Portsmouth	0–0	Preston North End	Portsmouth
15:00 BST	McLeod (penalty missed) 13' (yellow card) 88'; Rocha (yellow card) 90+5'	Report	(yellow card) 26' Wright; (yellow card) 40' Procter; (yellow card) 90+3' Robertson; (yellow card) 90+5' Mousinho	Stadium: Fratton Park; Attendance: 12,376; Referee: Whitestone

26 December 2012 24	Portsmouth	1–2	Crawley Town	Portsmouth
15:00 BST	Benson 11'; Harley (yellow card) 27'	Report	28' Adams; (yellow card) 45' Akpan; 73' Clarke; (yellow card) 90+2' Alexander	Stadium: Fratton Park; Attendance: 13,169; Referee: East

29 December 2012 25	Portsmouth	1–2	Yeovil Town	Portsmouth
15:00 BST	Michalík (yellow card) 19'; McLeod (yellow card) 33'; Adam Webster (yellow card) 45+2'; Rocha (yellow card) 51'; Benson 54'	Report	15' Blizzard; 38' Byron Webster; (yellow card) 42' Hayter; (yellow card) 90+2' Williams	Stadium: Fratton Park; Attendance: 12,370; Referee: Graham

1 January 2013 26	Swindon Town	5–0	Portsmouth	Swindon
14:00 BST	Williams (yellow card) 23'; Thompson (yellow card) 49'; Hollands (yellow card) 55' (goal) 69'; Collins 61' 66' 73' 83'	Report		Stadium: County Ground; Attendance: 11,381; Referee: Stephen Martin

4 January 2013 27	Walsall	2–0	Portsmouth	Walsall
19:45 BST	Brandy 29'; Grigg 40'	Report		Stadium: Bescot Stadium; Attendance: 4,038; Referee: Hooper

26 January 2013 30	Portsmouth	1–3	Hartlepool United	Portsmouth
15:00 BST	Wallace 67'	Report	18' Baldwin; 52' Poole; 90+4' Rutherford	Stadium: Fratton Park; Attendance: 10,981; Referee: Sheldrake

29 January 2013 28	Portsmouth	0–2	Notts County	Portsmouth
19:45 BST	Ertl (yellow card) 90+1'; Reed (yellow card) 90+4'	Report	81' Hughes; 88' Zoko; (red card) 90+1' Bishop	Stadium: Fratton Park; Attendance: 10,276; Referee: Ward

2 February 2013 31	Portsmouth	2–3	Colchester United	Portsmouth
15:00 BST	Wallace 5'; Keene 73'	Report	2' 20' Massey; 16' (pen.) Sears; (yellow card) 79' Porter; (yellow card) 80' Bean; (yellow card) 90+5' Ibehre	Stadium: Fratton Park; Attendance: 11,132; Referee: Phillips

5 February 2013 29	Scunthorpe United	2–1	Portsmouth	Scunthorpe
19:45 BST	A. Sodje 40' 85'	Report	45+3' Walker	Stadium: Glanford Park; Attendance: 2,596; Referee: Rushton

9 February 2013 32	AFC Bournemouth	2–0	Portsmouth	Bournemouth
15:00 BST	Grabban 63'; Pugh 77'	Report	(yellow card) 84' Dan Butler; (yellow card) 90' Reed	Stadium: Dean Court; Attendance: 9,135; Referee: Marriner

12 February 2013 23	Hartlepool United	0–0	Portsmouth	Hartlepool
19:45 BST		Report	(yellow card) 22' Wallace; (yellow card) 40' Sodje	Stadium: Victoria Park; Attendance: 3,526; Referee: Bond

16 February 2013 33	Portsmouth	1–1	Carlisle United	Portsmouth
15:00 BST	Sodje (yellow card) 57'; Walker 78' (pen.)	Report	(yellow card) 29' Thirlwell; 51' Loy; (yellow card) 77' Gillespie	Stadium: Fratton Park; Attendance: Carl Berry; Referee: 11,466

23 February 2013 34	Oldham Athletic	1–0	Portsmouth	Oldham
15:00 BST	Baxter 11'; Obita (yellow card) 87'	Report	(red card) 50' Sodje	Stadium: Boundary Park; Attendance: 4,527; Referee: Mark Heywood

26 February 2013 35	Portsmouth	1–1	Milton Keynes Dons	Portsmouth
19:45 BST	Connolly 22'; Gyepes (yellow card) 33'; Wallace (yellow card) 45+2'; Ertl (yellow card) 88'	Report	27' Williams; (yellow card) 44' Potter	Stadium: Fratton Park; Attendance: 9,815; Referee: Hill

2 March 2013 36	Crewe Alexandra	1–2	Portsmouth	Crewe
15:00 BST	Pogba 63'; Murphy (yellow card) 69'; Davis (yellow card) 90+2'; Robertson (yellow card) 90+3'	Report	6' Agyemang; 29' Connolly; (yellow card) 73' Ricardo Rocha; (yellow card) 90+2' Eastwood	Stadium: Alexandra Stadium; Attendance: 5,120; Referee: Geoff Eltringham

9 March 2013 37	Portsmouth	2–0	Bury	Portsmouth
15:00 BST	Connolly 50' 65'; Racon (yellow card) 82'	Report	(yellow card) 45+1' Thompson; (yellow card) 79' Schumacher; (yellow card) 82' Fagan	Stadium: Fratton Park; Attendance: 11,493; Referee: East

12 March 2013 38	Leyton Orient	1–0	Portsmouth	London
19:45 BST	Batt 57'; James (yellow card) 77'; Jones (yellow card) 90+5'	Report	(yellow card) 72' Maloney	Stadium: Brisbane Road; Attendance: 3,641; Referee: Sutton

16 March 2013 39	Doncaster Rovers	1–1	Portsmouth	Doncaster
15:00 BST	Brown 37'	Report	75' Wallace	Stadium: Keepmoat Stadium; Attendance: 7,604; Referee: Harrington

23 March 2013 40	Portsmouth	2–0	Coventry City	Portsmouth
15:00 BST	Wallace 15'; Walker (yellow card) 56'; Rocha (yellow card) 75'; Agyemang 76'	Report	(penalty missed) 7' McSheffrey; (yellow card) 74' Wilson	Stadium: Fratton Park; Attendance: 12,601; Referee: Phil Gibbs

29 March 2013 41	Preston North End	1–1	Portsmouth	Preston
17:00 BST	King (yellow card) 54'; Keane 77'	Report	3' Wallace; (yellow card) 19' Gyepes	Stadium: Deepdale; Attendance: 9,464; Referee: Lewis

1 April 2013 42	Portsmouth	1–0	Tranmere Rovers	Portsmouth
15:00 BST	Connolly 53'	Report	(yellow card) 49' Gibson	Stadium: Fratton Park; Attendance: 12,014; Referee: Madley

6 April 2013 43	Portsmouth	0–0	Stevenage	Portsmouth
15:00 BST	Racon (yellow card) 66'; Moutaouakil (yellow card) 78'	Report	(yellow card) 73' Ehmer; (yellow card) 78' Grant	Stadium: Fratton Park; Attendance: 12,036; Referee: Sarginson

13 April 2013 44	Brentford	3–2	Portsmouth	Brentford
15:00 BST	Wright-Phillips 21' 85'; Donaldson 86'	Report	26' Connolly; 58' Cooper	Stadium: Griffin Park; Attendance: 9,149; Referee: Jeremy Simpson

20 April 2013 45	Portsmouth	3–0	Sheffield United	Portsmouth
15:00 BST	Cooper 21'; Connolly 24'; Wallace 32'; Moutaouakil (yellow card) 57'	Report	(yellow card) 63' McDonald	Stadium: Fratton Park; Attendance: 18,433; Referee: Collins

27 April 2013 46	Shrewsbury Town	3–2	Portsmouth	Shrewsbury
15:00 BST	Goldson 6'; Jacobson 37'; Asante 56'; Taylor (yellow card) 90'	Report	61' Harris; 78' Agyemang	Stadium: New Meadow; Attendance: 8,021; Referee: Kettle

==== FA Cup ====
3 November 2012 First round proper	Portsmouth	0–2	Notts County	Portsmouth
15:00 BST	Buzsáky (yellow card) 65'; Allan (yellow card) 72' (red card) 74'; Gyepes (yellow card) 80'	Report	(yellow card) 1' Boucaud; 45+1' (yellow card) 69' Zoko; 56' Arquin; (yellow card) 77' Campbell-Ryce	Stadium: Fratton Park; Attendance: 7,560; Referee: Sheldrake

==== League Cup ====
14 August 2012 First round	Plymouth Argyle	3–0	Portsmouth	Plymouth
15:00 BST	Gorman 45'; Cowan-Hall (yellow card) 83' (goal) 86'; Chadwick 87'	Report		Stadium: Home Park; Attendance: 5,318; Referee: Malone

==== Football League Trophy ====
4 September 2012 First round	Portsmouth	2–2 (4–3 p)	AFC Bournemouth	Portsmouth
19:45 BST	Rodgers 45'; (yellow card) 52' (goal) 67' Howard; (yellow card) 62' Long	Report	5' 59' MacDonald; (yellow card) 30' Fogden; (yellow card) 83' Hughes	Stadium: Fratton Park; Attendance: 5,979; Referee: East
	Penalties
	Howard (penalty scored); Walker (penalty scored); Harris (penalty scored); Rodgers (penalty scored)		(penalty missed) Barnard; (penalty scored) Arter; (penalty scored) Cook; (penalty scored) Grabban; (penalty missed) Pugh

9 October 2012 Second round	Portsmouth	1–3	Wycombe Wanderers	Portsmouth
BST	McLeod 45+1'	Report	1' Grant; 9' 56' Morgan	Stadium: Fratton Park; Attendance: 7,292; Referee: Hooper

=== Development Squad/Friendlies ===
28 August 2012	Portsmouth Development Squad	3–1	Swindon Town	Portsmouth
BST		Report		Stadium: Wellington Sports Ground; Attendance: 0 (Behind closed doors)

11 September 2012	Portsmouth Development Squad	0–1	Exeter City	Portsmouth
BST		Report		Stadium: Wellington Sports Ground; Attendance: 0 (Behind closed doors)

16 October 2012	Portsmouth Development Squad	1–1	Crawley Town	Portsmouth
BST	Compton	Report		Stadium: Wellington Sports Ground; Attendance: 0 (Behind closed doors)

30 October 2012	Gosport Borough	1–4	Portsmouth Development Squad	Gosport
19:45 GMT	Norton	Report	24' 25' 30' 76' D. Thompson	Stadium: Privett Park; Attendance: 302

5 March 2013	Fulham	5–2	Portsmouth	London
15:00	Petrić; Rodallega 55'; Manolev 61' 70'; Emanuelson 82'	Report	36' Akinde; 90+' Harris	Stadium: Motspur Park

16 April 2013	Portsmouth	2–1	Íþróttabandalag Vestmannaeyja	Portsmouth
19:45 GMT	Tarbuck 18'; Walker 75'		90+5' Guðjónsson	Stadium: Fratton Park; Attendance: 6,780; Referee: Cook

Due to lack of first team players, Development squad matches were not needed for the rest of the season, as Development players were sent out on loan to non-league clubs. In addition to this, development squad supervisor Guy Whittingham became Portsmouth's caretaker manager.
