= 2014–15 Portsmouth F.C. season =

Portsmouth
2014–15 season
- Chairman: Pompey Supporters Trust (PST)
- Manager: Andy Awford (until 13 April); Gary Waddock (caretaker; from 13 April)
- Stadium: Fratton Park
- League Two: 16th
- FA Cup: First round
- League Cup: Second round
- League Trophy: Second round
- Top goalscorer: League: Jed Wallace (14); All: Jed Wallace (17)
- Highest home attendance: 17,558 vs. AFC Wimbledon (26 December 2014)
- Lowest home attendance: 13,281 vs. Stevenage (21 October 2014)
- Average home league attendance: 15,419
Home colours	Away colours	Third colours

The 2014–15 season was Portsmouth's second consecutive season in League Two, after a run of good results late in the last season saved the club from another relegation.

== Players ==
=== Squad details ===
As of 2 May 2015

No.	Name	Pos.	Nat.	Place of birth	Date of birth (age)	Club apps	Club goals	Int. caps	Int. goals	Signed from	Date signed	Fee	Contract End
Goalkeepers
1	Paul Jones	GK	(England)	Snodland	28 June 1986 (aged 28)	52	0	–	–	Crawley	4 June 2014	Free	30 June 2017
22	Michael Poke	GK	(England)	Staines	21 November 1985 (aged 29)	–	–	–	–	Torquay	24 June 2014	Free	30 June 2016
31	Alex Bass	GK	(England)	Southampton	1 April 1998 (aged 17)	–	–	–	–	Academy	12 August 2014	Trainee	30 June 2015
Defenders
2	Adam Webster	CB/RB	(England)	West Wittering	4 January 1995 (aged 20)	46	3	–	–	Academy	9 February 2011	Free	30 June 2015
3	Jack Whatmough	CB	(England)	Gosport	19 August 1996 (aged 18)	36	0	–	–	Academy	19 August 2013	Free	30 June 2017
4	Danny East	RB/DM	(England)	Hessle	26 December 1991 (aged 23)	23	1	–	–	Hull City	9 May 2013	Free	30 June 2015
5	Joe Devera	CB/RB	(England)	Southgate	6 February 1987 (aged 28)	80	1	–	–	Swindon	14 May 2013	Free	30 June 2015
6	Ben Chorley (c)	CB	(England)	Sidcup	30 September 1982 (aged 32)	31	0	–	–	Stevenage	20 January 2014	Free	30 June 2015
16	Paul Robinson	CB	(England)	Barnet	7 January 1982 (aged 33)	38	2	–	–	Millwall	7 January 2015	Free	30 June 2016
17	Nicky Shorey	LB/CM	(England)	Romford	15 February 1981 (aged 34)	44	0	2	0	Bristol City	9 January 2014	Free	30 June 2015
18	Josh Passley	RB/CB	(England)	Chelsea	21 November 1994 (aged 20)	12	0	–	–	Fulham	29 January 2015	Loan	25 March 2015
24	Nyron Nosworthy	CB	(Jamaica)	(England) Brixton	11 October 1980 (aged 34)	7	0	13	1	Blackpool	19 March 2015	Loan	30 June 2015
34	Dan Butler	LB	(England)	Cowes	26 August 1994 (aged 20)	54	0	–	–	Academy	15 July 2010	Free	30 June 2015
Midfielders
7	Andy Barcham	LW	(England)	Basildon	16 December 1986 (aged 28)	53	4	–	–	Scunthorpe United	20 May 2013	Free	30 June 2016
8	Jed Wallace	AM/CM/RW	(England)	Reading	26 March 1994 (aged 21)	121	30	–	–	Lewes	30 August 2011	Free	30 June 2017
13	Johnny Ertl	DM	(Austria)	Graz	13 November 1982 (aged 32)	88	2	7	0	Sheffield United	31 August 2012	Free	30 June 2016
19	Wes Fogden	RW/LW	(England)	Brighton	12 April 1988 (aged 27)	28	2	–	–	Bournemouth	15 January 2014	Free	30 June 2015
21	James Dunne	CM	(England)	Farnborough	18 September 1989 (aged 25)	38	1	–	–	Stevenage	24 June 2014	Undisc.	30 June 2016
25	Nigel Atangana	CM	(France)	Corbeil-Essonnes	9 September 1989 (aged 25)	35	1	–	–	Hawks	19 June 2014	£20K	30 June 2016
26	Bradley Tarbuck	RW	(England)	Emsworth	6 November 1995 (aged 19)	3	0	–	–	Academy	6 July 2012	Free	30 June 2015
29	Danny Hollands	CM	(England)	Ashford	6 November 1985 (aged 29)	54	7	–	–	Charlton	22 May 2014	Free	30 June 2016
30	Adam May	CM	(England)	Southampton	6 December 1997 (aged 17)	1	0	–	–	Academy	17 April 2015	Trainee	30 June 2016
33	Ben Close	CM	(England)	Portsmouth	8 August 1996 (aged 18)	9	0	–	–	Academy	3 May 2014	Free	30 June 2015
Forwards
9	Ryan Taylor	ST	(England)	Rotherham	4 May 1988 (aged 26)	59	15	–	–	Bristol City	9 January 2014	Free	30 June 2015
10	Tom Craddock	ST	(England)	Darlington	14 October 1986 (aged 28)	11	1	–	–	Oxford	13 May 2013	Free	30 June 2015
14	Matt Tubbs	ST	(England)	Salisbury	15 May 1984 (aged 30)	23	9	–	–	Bournemouth	8 January 2015	Free	30 June 2017
15	Paul McCallum	ST	(England)	Streatham	28 July 1993 (aged 21)	7	0	–	–	West Ham	15 January 2015	Loan	30 June 2015
20	Craig Westcarr	ST/RW/LW	(England)	Nottingham	29 January 1985 (aged 30)	37	7	–	–	Walsall	17 June 2014	Free	30 June 2016
36	Conor Chaplin	ST/LW	(England)	Worthing	16 February 1997 (aged 18)	9	1	–	–	Academy	20 October 2014	Free	30 June 2016

== Transfers ==
=== In ===
No.	Pos.	Nat.	Name	Age	EU	Moving from	Type	Transfer window	Ends	Transfer fee	Source
33	MF	(England)	Ben Close	17	EU	Youth system	Promoted	Summer	2015	Free	Portsmouth FC
26	MF	(England)	Bradley Tarbuck	18	EU	Youth system	Promoted	Summer	2015	Free	Portsmouth FC
29	MF	(England)	Danny Hollands	28	EU	Charlton Athletic	Transfer	Summer	2016	Free	Portsmouth FC
1	GK	(England)	Paul Jones	27	EU	Crawley Town	Transfer	Summer	2017	Free	Portsmouth FC
20	FW	(England)	Craig Westcarr	29	EU	Walsall	Transfer	Summer	2016	Free	Portsmouth FC
25	MF	(France)	Nigel Atangana	24	EU	Havant & Waterlooville	Transfer	Summer	2016	£20K	Portstmouth FC
22	GK	(England)	Michael Poke	28	EU	Torquay United	Transfer	Summer	2016	Free	Portsmouth FC
21	MF	(England)	James Dunne	24	EU	Stevenage	Transfer	Summer	2016	Undisclosed	Portsmouth FC
15	DF	(England)	Alex Wynter	20	EU	Crystal Palace	Loan	Summer	2015	Free	Portsmouth FC
14	FW	(England)	Miles Storey	20	EU	Swindon Town	Loan	Summer	2015	Free	Portsmouth FC
16	DF	(England)	Paul Robinson	32	EU	Millwall	Loan	Summer	2014	Free	Portsmouth FC
25	GK	(Slovakia)	Peter Brezovan	34	EU	Brighton & Hove Albion	Transfer	Summer	2015	Free	Portsmouth FC
18	FW	(Republic of Ireland)	Michael Drennan	20	EU	Aston Villa	Loan	During season	2014	Free	Portsmouth FC
18	MF	(Jamaica)	Marcus Bean	30	EU	Colchester United	Loan	During season	2015	Free	Portsmouth FC
27	DF	(England)	Matt Fish	25	EU	Gillingham	Loan	During season	2015	Free	Portsmouth FC
28	MF	(England)	Lee Holmes	27	EU	Preston North End	Loan	During season	2015	Free	Portsmouth FC
16	DF	(England)	Paul Robinson	33	EU	Millwall	Transfer	Winter	2016	Free	Portsmouth FC
14	FW	(England)	Matt Tubbs	30	EU	Bournemouth	Transfer	Winter	2017	Free	Portsmouth FC
15	FW	(England)	Paul McCallum	21	EU	West Ham United	Loan	Winter	2015	Free	Portsmouth FC
18	DF	(England)	Josh Passley	20	EU	Fulham	Loan	Winter	2015	Free	Portsmouth FC
4	DF	(England)	Danny East	23	EU	Aldershot Town	Loan Return	During season	2015	Free	BBC Sport
27	GK	(Wales)	David Cornell	23	EU	Swansea City (Wales)	Loan	During season	2015	Free	Portsmouth F.C
24	DF	(Jamaica)	Nyron Nosworthy	34	EU	Blackpool	Loan	During season	2015	Free	Portsmouth F.C
28	DF	(England)	Cole Kpekawa	18	EU	Queens Park Rangers	Loan	During season	2015	Free	Portsmouth F.C

Total spending: ▼£20.000

=== Out ===
No.	Pos.	Nat.	Name	Age	EU	Moving to	Type	Transfer window	Transfer fee	Source
2	DF	(France)	Yassin Moutaouakil	27	EU	Free agent	Released	Summer	Free	Portsmouth FC
31	MF	(France)	Therry Racon	30	EU	Free agent	Released	Summer	Free	Portsmouth FC
	MF	(England)	George Branford	19	EU	Lewes	Released	Summer	Free	Portsmouth FC
21	FW	(England)	Ashley Harris	20	EU	Gainsborough Trinity	Released	Summer	Free	Portsmouth FC
32	FW	(England)	Jake Jervis	22	EU	Ross County (Scotland)	Released	Summer	Free	Portsmouth FC
14	DF	(Republic of Ireland)	Marcos Painter	27	EU	Free agent	Released	Summer	Free	Portsmouth FC
1	GK	(England)	Phil Smith	34	EU	Aldershot Town	Released	Summer	Free	Portsmouth FC
	DF	(England)	Liam Triggs	19	EU	Newport (IOW)	Released	Summer	Free	Portsmouth FC
	DF	(England)	Joshua Warren	19	EU	Bognor Regis Town	Released	Summer	Free	Portsmouth FC
15	DF	(Wales)	Daniel Alfei	22	EU	Swansea City (Wales)	Loan Return	Summer	Free	Portsmouth FC
40	GK	(Northern Ireland)	Trevor Carson	26	EU	Bury	Loan Return	Summer	Free	Portsmouth FC
29	MF	(England)	Danny Hollands	28	EU	Charlton Athletic	Loan Return	Summer	Free	Portsmouth FC
28	FW	(Republic of Ireland)	Michael Drennan	20	EU	Aston Villa	Loan Return	Summer	Free	Portsmouth FC
3	DF	(England)	Bondz N'Gala	24	EU	Barnet	Released	Summer	Free	Portsmouth FC
25	GK	(England)	John Sullivan	26	EU	Whitehawk	Contract Terminated	Summer	Free	Portsmouth FC
16	MF	(Scotland)	Simon Ferry	26	EU	Dundee (Scotland)	Contract Terminated	Summer	Free	Portsmouth FC
6	DF	(England)	Sonny Bradley	22	EU	Crawley Town	Transfer	Summer	Undisclosed	Portsmouth FC
8	MF	(France)	Romain Padovani	24	EU	Fréjus (France)	Contract Terminated	Summer	Free	Portsmouth FC
27	GK	(Slovakia)	Peter Brezovan	34	EU	Tranmere Rovers	Contract Terminated	Summer	Free	Portsmouth FC
18	FW	(England)	Ryan Bird	26	EU	Cambridge United	Contract Terminated	Summer	Free	Portsmouth FC
30	MF	(England)	Jack Maloney	19	EU	Poole Town	Loan	During season	Loan	Portsmouth FC
23	FW	(Ghana)	Patrick Agyemang	34	EU	Dagenham & Redbridge	Loan	During season	Free	Portsmouth FC
26	MF	(England)	Bradley Tarbuck	19	EU	Dartford	Loan	During season	Loan	Portsmouth FC
15	DF	(England)	Alex Wynter	21	EU	Crystal Palace	Loan Return	During season	Free	Portsmouth News
27	DF	(England)	Matt Fish	25	EU	Gillingham	Loan Return	During season	Free	Portsmouth News
28	MF	(England)	Lee Holmes	27	EU	Preston North End	Loan Return	During season	Free	Portsmouth News
14	FW	(England)	Miles Storey	20	EU	Swindon Town	Loan Return	Winter	Free	Portsmouth FC
11	MF	(England)	Ricky Holmes	27	EU	Northampton Town	Loan	Winter	Free	Portsmouth FC
4	DF	(England)	Danny East	23	EU	Aldershot Town	Loan	Winter	Free	Portsmouth FC
35	FW	(Republic of Ireland)	David Connolly	37	EU	AFC Wimbledon	Released	Winter	Free	Portsmouth FC
11	MF	(England)	Ricky Holmes	27	EU	Northampton Town	Transfer	Winter	Free	Portsmouth FC
26	MF	(England)	Bradley Tarbuck	19	EU	Dorchester Town	Loan	Winter	Free	Portsmouth FC
33	MF	(England)	Ben Close	19	EU	Poole Town	Loan	During Season	Free	Portsmouth FC
24	MF	(England)	Nick Awford	19	EU	Havant & Waterlooville	Released	During Season	Free	Portsmouth News
30	MF	(England)	Jack Maloney	20	EU	Bognor Regis Town	Released	During season	Free	Portsmouth News
23	FW	(Ghana)	Patrick Agyemang	34	EU	Free agent	Released	During season	Free	Portsmouth FC
		(England)	Andy Awford	42	EU	Free agent	Resigned	During season	Free	BBC Sport
27	GK	(Wales)	David Cornell	24	EU	Swansea City (Wales)	Loan Return	During season	Free	Portsmouth News
28	DF	(England)	Cole Kpekawa	18	EU	Queens Park Rangers	Loan Return	During season	Free	Portsmouth News

Total gaining: ▲£0

=== Contracts ===
No.	Pos.	Nat.	Name	Age	Status	Contract length	Expiry date	Source
35	MF	(England)	Jed Wallace	20	Signed	3 years	June 2017	Portsmouth FC
17	DF	(England)	Nicky Shorey	33	Signed	1 year	June 2015	Portsmouth FC
3	DF	(England)	Bondz N'Gala	23	Collapsed	0 year	June 2014	Portsmouth FC
24	MF	(England)	Nick Awford	19	Signed	1 year	June 2015	Portsmouth FC
30	MF	(England)	Jack Maloney	19	Signed	1 year	June 2015	Portsmouth FC
33	MF	(England)	Ben Close	17	Signed	1 year	June 2015	Portsmouth FC
32	MF	(England)	Bradley Tarbuck	18	Signed	1 year	June 2015	Portsmouth FC
18	FW	(England)	Ryan Bird	26	Signed	1 year	June 2015	Portsmouth FC
22	DF	(England)	Adam Webster	19	Signed	1 year	June 2015	Portsmouth FC
16	DF	(England)	Paul Robinson	32	Loan Extended	5 months	January 2015	Portsmouth FC
36	FW	(England)	Conor Chaplin	17	Signed	2 years	June 2016	Portsmouth FC
34	DF	(England)	Dan Butler	20	Talks	Undisclosed	Undisclosed	Portsmouth News
22	DF	(England)	Adam Webster	19	Talks	Undisclosed	Undisclosed	Portsmouth News
18	DF	(England)	Josh Passley	20	Loan Extended	1 month	March 2015	Portsmouth FC

== Player statistics ==
=== Squad stats ===
As of 2 May 2015

No.	Pos	Nat	Player	Total		League Two		FA Cup		League Cup		League Trophy	
No.	Pos	Nat	Player	Apps	Goals	Apps	Goals	Apps	Goals	Apps	Goals	Apps	Goals
1	GK	(England) ENG	Paul Jones	52	0	46	0	2	0	2	0	2	0
2	DF	(England) ENG	Adam Webster	18	1	12+3	1	0	0	1+1	0	0+1	0
3	DF	(England) ENG	Jack Whatmough	24	0	21+1	0	1	0	1	0	0	0
4	DF	(England) ENG	Danny East	4	0	3+1	0	0	0	0	0	0	0
5	DF	(England) ENG	Joe Devera	43	1	37+2	1	1	0	2	0	1	0
6	DF	(England) ENG	Ben Chorley	19	0	15+1	0	0+2	0	1	0	0	0
7	MF	(England) ENG	Andy Barcham	22	1	6+13	1	0	0	1	0	0+2	0
8	MF	(England) ENG	Jed Wallace	50	17	43+1	14	2	1	1+1	0	2	2
9	FW	(England) ENG	Ryan Taylor	41	10	31+6	9	1+1	0	1	0	1	1
10	FW	(England) ENG	Tom Craddock	0	0	0	0	0	0	0	0	0	0
13	MF	(Austria) AUT	Johnny Ertl	17	1	7+7	1	0	0	1	0	2	0
14	FW	(England) ENG	Matt Tubbs	23	9	23	9	0	0	0	0	0	0
15	FW	(England) ENG	Paul McCallum	7	0	0+7	0	0	0	0	0	0	0
16	DF	(England) ENG	Paul Robinson	38	2	33	2	2	0	2	0	1	0
17	DF	(England) ENG	Nicky Shorey	23	0	19+1	0	2	0	0	0	0+1	0
18	DF	(England) ENG	Josh Passley	12	0	12	0	0	0	0	0	0	0
19	MF	(England) ENG	Wes Fogden	9	0	3+6	0	0	0	0	0	0	0
20	FW	(England) ENG	Craig Westcarr	37	7	21+12	6	2	0	1	0	1	1
21	MF	(England) ENG	James Dunne	38	1	34+2	1	0	0	1	0	1	0
22	GK	(England) ENG	Michael Poke	0	0	0	0	0	0	0	0	0	0
24	DF	(Jamaica) JAM	Nyron Nosworthy	7	0	6+1	0	0	0	0	0	0	0
25	MF	(France) FRA	Nigel Atangana	35	1	16+14	1	2	0	1	0	2	0
26	MF	(England) ENG	Bradley Tarbuck	2	0	0+2	0	0	0	0	0	0	0
29	MF	(England) ENG	Danny Hollands	48	2	39+5	1	2	1	1+1	0	0	0
30	MF	(England) ENG	Adam May	1	0	0+1	0	0	0	0	0	0	0
33	MF	(England) ENG	Ben Close	9	0	3+3	0	0+1	0	0	0	1+1	0
34	DF	(England) ENG	Dan Butler	34	0	26+4	0	0	0	2	0	2	0
36	FW	(England) ENG	Conor Chaplin	9	1	1+8	1	0	0	0	0	0	0
Players on loan to other clubs:
Players who have left the club after the start of the season:
11	MF	(England) ENG	Ricky Holmes	17	0	9+4	0	2	0	1	0	1	0
14	FW	(England) ENG	Miles Storey	22	3	10+7	2	1+1	0	0+2	1	1	0
15	DF	(England) ENG	Alex Wynter	15	0	10	0	2	0	1	0	2	0
18	FW	(England) ENG	Ryan Bird	3	0	0+2	0	0	0	0+1	0	0	0
18	FW	(Republic of Ireland) IRL	Michael Drennan	4	0	3+1	0	0	0	0	0	0	0
18	MF	(Jamaica) JAM	Marcus Bean	6	1	6	1	0	0	0	0	0	0
23	FW	(Ghana) GHA	Patrick Agyemang	10	0	3+5	0	0+1	0	0	0	0+1	0
24	MF	(England) ENG	Nick Awford	4	0	1	0	0	0	1	0	2	0
27	GK	(Slovakia) SVK	Peter Brezovan	0	0	0	0	0	0	0	0	0	0
27	GK	(Wales) WAL	David Cornell	0	0	0	0	0	0	0	0	0	0
27	DF	(England) ENG	Matt Fish	3	0	3	0	0	0	0	0	0	0
28	DF	(England) ENG	Cole Kpekawa	2	0	2	0	0	0	0	0	0	0
28	MF	(England) ENG	Lee Holmes	5	0	3+2	0	0	0	0	0	0	0
30	MF	(England) ENG	Jack Maloney	0	0	0	0	0	0	0	0	0	0
35	FW	(Republic of Ireland) IRL	David Connolly	0	0	0	0	0	0	0	0	0	0

=== Top scorers ===
Place	Position	Nation	Number	Name	League Two	FA Cup	League Cup	FL Trophy	Total
1	MF	(England)	8	Jed Wallace	14	1	0	2	17
2	FW	(England)	9	Ryan Taylor	9	0	0	1	10
3	FW	(England)	14	Matt Tubbs	9	0	0	0	9
4	FW	(England)	20	Craig Westcarr	6	0	0	1	7
5	FW	(England)	14	Miles Storey	2	0	1	0	3
6	DF	(England)	16	Paul Robinson	2	0	0	0	2
6	MF	(England)	29	Danny Hollands	1	1	0	0	2
7	DF	(England)	2	Adam Webster	1	0	0	0	1
7	DF	(England)	5	Joe Devera	1	0	0	0	1
7	MF	(England)	7	Andy Barcham	1	0	0	0	1
7	MF	(Austria)	13	Johnny Ertl	1	0	0	0	1
7	MF	(Jamaica)	18	Marcus Bean	1	0	0	0	1
7	MF	(England)	21	James Dunne	1	0	0	0	1
7	MF	(France)	25	Nigel Atangana	1	0	0	0	1
7	FW	(England)	36	Conor Chaplin	1	0	0	0	1
	Own goals				1	0	0	0	1
				TOTALS	50	2	1	4	57

=== Disciplinary record ===
Number	Nation	Position	Name	League Two		FA Cup		League Cup		FL Trophy		Total	
Number	Nation	Position	Name	Booked	Sent off (straight red)	Booked	Sent off (straight red)	Booked	Sent off (straight red)	Booked	Sent off (straight red)	Booked	Sent off (straight red)
21	(England)	MF	James Dunne	9	0	0	0	0	0	1	0	10	0
16	(England)	DF	Paul Robinson	6	0	2	1	0	0	0	0	8	1
8	(England)	MF	Jed Wallace	7	0	0	0	0	0	0	0	7	0
3	(England)	DF	Jack Whatmough	6	0	1	0	0	0	0	0	7	0
34	(England)	DF	Dan Butler	5	1	0	0	0	0	0	0	5	1
29	(England)	MF	Danny Hollands	5	0	0	0	0	0	0	0	5	0
11	(England)	MF	Ricky Holmes	3	0	1	0	0	0	1	0	5	0
20	(England)	FW	Craig Westcarr	4	0	0	0	0	0	0	0	4	0
25	(France)	MF	Nigel Atangana	2	0	2	0	0	0	0	0	4	0
6	(England)	DF	Ben Chorley	3	1	0	0	0	0	0	0	3	1
5	(England)	DF	Joe Devera	3	0	0	0	0	0	0	0	3	0
18	(Jamaica)	MF	Marcus Bean	3	0	0	0	0	0	0	0	3	0
1	(England)	GK	Paul Jones	2	0	0	0	0	0	0	0	2	0
14	(England)	FW	Matt Tubbs	2	0	0	0	0	0	0	0	2	0
15	(England)	DF	Alex Wynter	1	0	0	0	0	0	1	0	2	0
2	(England)	DF	Adam Webster	1	1	0	0	0	0	0	0	1	1
15	(England)	FW	Paul McCallum	0	1	0	0	0	0	0	0	0	1
9	(England)	FW	Ryan Taylor	1	0	0	0	0	0	0	0	1	0
18	(England)	DF	Josh Passley	1	0	0	0	0	0	0	0	1	0
18	(Republic of Ireland)	FW	Michael Drennan	1	0	0	0	0	0	0	0	1	0
24	(Jamaica)	DF	Nyron Nosworthy	1	0	0	0	0	0	0	0	1	0
26	(England)	MF	Bradley Tarbuck	1	0	0	0	0	0	0	0	1	0
27	(England)	DF	Matt Fish	1	0	0	0	0	0	0	0	1	0
28	(England)	DF	Cole Kpekawa	1	0	0	0	0	0	0	0	1	0
24	(England)	MF	Nick Awford	0	0	0	0	0	0	1	0	1	0
			TOTALS	69	4	6	1	0	0	4	0	79	5

== Competition ==
=== Pre-season ===
12 July 2014	Havant & Waterlooville	0–4	Portsmouth	Havant
15:00 GMT		Report	50' 86' Westcarr; 65' Bird; 82' Holmes	Stadium: Westleigh Park; Attendance: 2,500; Referee: Andy Laver

19 July 2014	Bognor Regis Town	1–6	Portsmouth	Bognor Regis
13:00 GMT	Parsons 29'	Report	24' Taylor; 26' Storey; 45' Hollands; 56' Tarbuck; 68' Barcham; 85' Wallace	Stadium: Nyewood Lane

22 July 2014	Thurrock	0–2	Portsmouth	Aveley
19:45 GMT		Report	33' 39' Westcarr	Stadium: Ship Lane; Referee: Nigel Lugg

22 July 2014	Portchester	1–1	Portsmouth XI	Portchester
19:30 GMT	Moody 51'	Report	19' Nilsen	Stadium: Wicor Recreation Ground

26 July 2014	Ebbsfleet	3–0	Portsmouth	Northfleet
15:00 GMT	Sheringham 20' 58'; Bricknell 54'	Report		Stadium: Stonebridge Road; Attendance: 879; Referee: Ian Fissenden

29 July 2014	Portsmouth	2–3	Bournemouth	Portsmouth
19:45 GMT	Dunne 74'; Wallace 83' (pen.)	Report	Rantie 3'; Pitman 22'; Arter 36'	Stadium: Fratton Park; Attendance: 4,061 (267 away fans); Referee: Andy Davies

2 August 2014	Portsmouth	1–2	Charlton	Portsmouth
15:00 GMT	Hollands 22'	Report	Vetokele 19'; Țucudean 25'	Stadium: Fratton Park; Attendance: 3,912 (362 away fans); Referee: James Linington

=== League Two ===
==== League table ====
2014–15 Football Leag

==== Results summary ====
Overall								Home						Away					
Pld	W	D	L	GF	GA	GD	Pts	W	D	L	GF	GA	GD	W	D	L	GF	GA	GD
46	14	15	17	52	54	−2	57	11	6	6	34	23	+11	3	9	11	18	31	−13

==== Results by round ====
Round	1	2	3	4	5	6	7	8	9	10	11	12	13	14	15	16	17	18	19	20	21	22	23	24	25	26	27	28	29	30	31	32	33	34	35	36	37	38	39	40	41	42	43	44	45	46
Ground	A	H	H	A	H	A	A	H	H	A	A	H	A	H	A	H	A	H	A	H	A	H	A	A	H	H	A	H	A	H	A	H	H	A	A	H	H	A	H	A	H	A	A	H	A	H
Result	D	W	W	W	L	L	L	W	D	D	D	D	L	W	L	W	L	W	L	L	D	L	D	L	D	L	D	W	D	W	W	W	D	L	D	W	D	L	L	D	W	L	L	L	W	D
Position	13	7	4	2	7	9	11	9	11	8	9	12	14	11	13	9	13	10	12	14	14	15	15	17	16	18	18	16	16	16	14	13	12	13	14	13	12	13	14	14	14	14	14	16	16	16

Source: Statto.com
A = Away; H = Home; W = Win; D = Draw; L = Loss

==== Matches ====
The fixtures for the 2014–15 season were announced on 18 June 2014 at 9am.

9 August 2014 1	Exeter City	1–1	Portsmouth	Exeter
15:00	Nichols 27'; Woodman (yellow card) 61'	Report	(yellow card) 60' Whatmough; 74' Wallace	Stadium: St James Park; Attendance: 5,694; Referee: Andy Woolmer

16 August 2014 2	Portsmouth	2–1	Cambridge United	Portsmouth
15:00	Webster (yellow card) 18' (red card) 44'; Taylor 34'; Dunn 66' (o.g.)	Report	69' Appiah	Stadium: Fratton Park; Attendance: 16,671; Referee: Darren Sheldrake

19 August 2014 3	Portsmouth	2–0	Northampton Town	Portsmouth
19:45	Wallace 26'; Westcarr 39'	Report		Stadium: Fratton Park; Attendance: 15,004; Referee: Gavin Ward

23 August 2014 4	Oxford United	0–1	Portsmouth	Oxford
15:00		Report	(yellow card) 22' Holmes; 80' Westcarr	Stadium: Kassam Stadium; Attendance: 6,852; Referee: Darren Bond

30 August 2014 5	Portsmouth	0–1	Newport County	Portsmouth
15:00	Dunne (yellow card) 51'; Devera (yellow card) 71'; Chorley (yellow card) 80'; Wallace (yellow card) 90+5'	Report	(yellow card) 22' Minshull; (yellow card) 37' Byrne; (yellow card) 48' Hughes; (yellow card) 64' Chapman; 84' (yellow card) 90+4' Sandell; (yellow card) 90+5' O'Connor	Stadium: Fratton Park; Attendance: 16,191; Referee: Lee Collins

7 September 2014 6	Burton Albion	2–0	Portsmouth	Burton upon Trent
12:15	McGurk 2'; Akins 55'	Report	(yellow card) 75' Wallace	Stadium: Pirelli Stadium; Attendance: 2,980; Referee: Oliver Langford

13 September 2014 7	Southend United	2–0	Portsmouth	Southend-on-Sea
15:00	Deegan (yellow card) 45+1'; Corr 56'; Payne (yellow card) 65'; Coulthirst 90'	Report	(yellow card) 44' Dunne; (yellow card) 58' Ricky Holmes; (yellow card) 59' Wallace; (yellow card) 84' Robinson	Stadium: Roots Hall; Attendance: 7,023; Referee: Graham Scott

16 September 2014 8	Portsmouth	3–0	Dagenham & Redbridge	Portsmouth
19:45	Dunne 40'; Hollands (yellow card) 50'; Wallace 69' (pen.); Westcarr (yellow card) 79'; Butler (yellow card) 90'; Barcham 90+2'	Report	(yellow card) 18' (red card) 62' Boucaud	Stadium: Fratton Park; Attendance: 13,648; Referee: Carl Berry

20 September 2014 9	Portsmouth	1–1	Wycombe Wanderers	Portsmouth
15:00	Whatmough (yellow card) 37'; Ertl 70'; Paul Robinson (yellow card) 75'	Report	50' Wood; (yellow card) 71' Pierre; (yellow card) 81' Scowen; (yellow card) 88' Hayes	Stadium: Fratton Park; Attendance: 16,171; Referee: Gary Sutton

27 September 2014 10	Hartlepool United	0–0	Portsmouth	Hartlepool
15:00		Report	(yellow card) 18' Wynter	Stadium: Victoria Park; Attendance: 3,439; Referee: Mark Heywood

4 October 2014 11	York City	0–0	Portsmouth	York
15:00	McCombe (yellow card) 63'; Ilesanmi (yellow card) 67'; Penn (yellow card) 77'	Report	(yellow card) 84' Hollands	Stadium: Bootham Crescent; Attendance: 3,857; Referee: Geoff Eltringham

11 October 2014 12	Portsmouth	1–1	Mansfield Town	Portsmouth
15:00	Dunne (yellow card) 54'; Robinson 70'	Report	(yellow card) 42' Rhead; 46' Heslop; (yellow card) 90+4' Riley	Stadium: Fratton Park; Attendance: 15,585; Referee: Stuart Attwell

18 October 2014 13	Bury	3–0	Portsmouth	Bury
15:00	Mayor 9'; Etuhu (yellow card) 29'; Lowe 44'; Rose 61'	Report	(yellow card) 21' Drennan; (yellow card) 69' Devera; (yellow card) 81' Wallace	Stadium: Gigg Lane; Attendance: 4,259; Referee: Bobby Madley

21 October 2014 14	Portsmouth	3–2	Stevenage	Portsmouth
19:45	Wallace 34'; Storey 57'; Devera 79'; Dunne (yellow card) 82'; Holmes (yellow card) 84'	Report	23' Wells; (yellow card) 33' Henry; (yellow card) 51' Lee; 74' Beardsley	Stadium: Fratton Park; Attendance: 13,281; Referee: Mick Russell

25 October 2014 15	Shrewsbury Town	2–1	Portsmouth	Shrewsbury
15:00	Wesolowski 13'; Goldson 72'	Report	3' (pen.) Wallace; (yellow card) 62' Dunne; (yellow card) 81' Robinson	Stadium: New Meadow; Attendance: 5,515; Referee: Dean Whitestone

1 November 2014 16	Portsmouth	3–0	Carlisle United	Portsmouth
15:00	Westcarr 2'; Storey 26'; Hollands (yellow card) 48' (goal) 74'; Tarbuck (yellow card) 90+2'	Report	(yellow card) 62' Grainger; (yellow card) 82' Potts; (red card) 90' White; (yellow card) 90+1' Marrow	Stadium: Fratton Park; Attendance: 15,533; Referee: Chris Sarginson

17 November 2014 17	Plymouth Argyle	3-0	Portsmouth	Plymouth
12:05	Reid 6' (pen.) 30'; Alessandra 21'	Report		Stadium: Home Park; Attendance: 10,354; Referee: Andy Madley

22 November 2014 18	Portsmouth	3–0	Morecambe	Portsmouth
15:00	Westcarr 11'; Whatmough (yellow card) 19'; Bean (yellow card) 36'; Wallace 54' 88'	Report	(yellow card) 46' Goodall; (yellow card) 70' Ellison; (yellow card) 82' Hughes; (yellow card) 84' Davies	Stadium: Fratton Park; Attendance: 14,349; Referee: Gavin Ward

29 November 2014 19	Tranmere Rovers	3–1	Portsmouth	Tranmere
15:00	Fenelon 2'; Jennings (yellow card) 53'; Rowe 68'; Power 78'	Report	57' (yellow card) 77' Wallace	Stadium: Prenton Park; Attendance: 5,163; Referee: Carl Boyeson

13 December 2014 20	Portsmouth	2–3	Accrington Stanley	Portsmouth
15:00	Bean 17' (yellow card) 70'; Westcarr 31'; Fish (yellow card) 37'	Report	Atkinson 11'; O'Sullivan 15'; Winnard (yellow card) 44'; Joyce (yellow card) 45+1'; Mingoia 78'; Hunt (yellow card) 82'	Stadium: Fratton Park; Attendance: 14,300; Referee: Keith Hill

20 December 2014 21	Cheltenham Town	1–1	Portsmouth	Cheltenham
15:00	Sterling-James 42'; Braham-Barrett (yellow card) 90+1'; Vaughan (yellow card) 90+2'	Report	56' Atangana	Stadium: Whaddon Road; Attendance: 3,331; Referee: Fred Graham

26 December 2014 22	Portsmouth	0–2	AFC Wimbledon	Portsmouth
13:00	Butler (yellow card) 16' (red card) 69'; Robinson (yellow card) 39'; Westcarr (yellow card) 90'	Report	9' Sutherland; 17' Tubbs; (yellow card) 84' Bulman	Stadium: Fratton Park; Attendance: 17,558; Referee: Charles Breakspear

28 December 2014 23	Luton Town	1–1	Portsmouth	Luton
15:00	Rooney 13'	Report	36' Taylor; (yellow card) 68' Bean; (yellow card) 81' Westcarr	Stadium: Kenilworth Road; Attendance: 10,071; Referee: Darren Deadman

10 January 2015 25	Newport County	1–0	Portsmouth	Newport, Wales
15:00	Byrne 68'; Klukowski (yellow card) 83'	Report	(yellow card) 61' Hollands; (yellow card) 71' Jones	Stadium: Rodney Parade; Attendance: 4,575; Referee: Michael Bull

17 January 2015 26	Portsmouth	1–1	Burton Albion	Portsmouth
15:00	Wallace 36'; Dunne (yellow card) 43'	Report	(yellow card) 70' Weir; 82' Lenihan	Stadium: Fratton Park; Attendance: 14,323; Referee: Scott Mathieson

24 January 2015 27	Portsmouth	1–2	Southend United	Portsmouth
15:00	Webster 24'; McCallum (red card) 90+4'	Report	29' Leonard; (yellow card) 43' Timlin; 70' Pigott; (yellow card) 78' (red card) 89' Corr; (yellow card) 90+5' White	Stadium: Fratton Park; Attendance: 15,573; Referee: Lee Collins

31 January 2015 28	Wycombe Wanderers	0–0	Portsmouth	High Wycombe
15:00	Amadi-Holloway (yellow card) 83'	Report	(yellow card) 53' Passley; (yellow card) 82' Whatmough; (yellow card) 86' Jones; (yellow card) 90+1' Dunne	Stadium: Adams Park; Attendance: 5,829; Referee: Andy D'Urso

7 February 2015 29	Portsmouth	1–0	Hartlepool United	Portsmouth
15:00	Tubbs 60' (yellow card) 90+1'	Report	(yellow card) 22' Tshibola; (yellow card) 63' Harrison; (yellow card) 74' Featherstone	Stadium: Fratton Park; Attendance: 14,397; Referee: Graham Horwood

10 February 2015 30	Dagenham & Redbridge	0–0	Portsmouth	Dagenham
19:45	Jakubiak (yellow card) 45+2'	Report	(yellow card) 80' Robinson	Stadium: Victoria Road; Attendance: 2,310; Referee: Trevor Kettle

14 February 2015 31	Portsmouth	1–0	Exeter City	Portsmouth
15:00	Wallace (yellow card) 59' (penalty missed) 73' 90+1'; Atangana (yellow card) 90+4'	Report	(yellow card) 36' Harley; (yellow card) 72' Ribeiro; (yellow card) 73' Butterfield	Stadium: Fratton Park; Attendance: 14,097; Referee: Pat Miller

21 February 2015 32	Cambridge United	2–6	Portsmouth	Cambridge
15:00 GMT	Mendez-Laing 22'; Simpson 54'	Report	2' Wallace; (yellow card) 9' Hollands; 24' 45+3' 81' Tubbs; 33' Robinson; (yellow card) 47' Whatmough; 74' Taylor; (yellow card) 90+3' Atangana	Stadium: Abbey Stadium; Attendance: 6,528; Referee: Seb Stockbridge

24 February 2015 24	Portsmouth	3–2	Tranmere Rovers	Portsmouth
19:45 GMT	Dunne (yellow card) 32'; Westcarr 76'; Taylor 82' 85'; Tubbs (yellow card) 90+3'	Report	28' Myrie-Williams; (yellow card) 35' Laird; 50' Odejayi	Stadium: Fratton Park; Attendance: 13,660; Referee: Iain Williamson

28 February 2015 33	Portsmouth	0–0	Oxford United	Portsmouth
15:00 GMT	Taylor (yellow card) 48'	Report	(yellow card) 46' MacDonald; (yellow card) 72' Baldock	Stadium: Fratton Park; Attendance: 16,355; Referee: Darren Deadman

3 March 2015 34	Northampton Town	1–0	Portsmouth	Northampton
15:00 GMT	Holmes 25'; Byrom (yellow card) 39'; Cresswell (yellow card) 61'; Horwood (yellow card) 76'	Report	(yellow card) 53' (red card) 90+3' Chorley	Stadium: Sixfields Stadium; Attendance: 4,871; Referee: Phil Gibbs

7 March 2015 35	Accrington Stanley	1–1	Portsmouth	Accrington
15:00 GMT	Windass 16'; Atkinson (yellow card) 41'; Barry (red card) 53'	Report	20' Taylor; (yellow card) 57' Robinson	Stadium: Crown Ground; Attendance: 1,994; Referee: Robert Lewis

14 March 2015 36	Portsmouth	2–0	Luton Town	Portsmouth
15:00 GMT	Tubbs 3'; Whatmough (yellow card) 18'; Taylor 62'; Butler (yellow card) 67'	Report	(yellow card) 8' Wilkinson; (yellow card) 45+2' Cullen	Stadium: Fratton Park; Attendance: 17,149; Referee: Darren Drysdale

17 March 2015 37	Portsmouth	2–2	Cheltenham Town	Portsmouth
19:45 GMT	Tubbs 17'; Taylor 43'	Report	18' Eichards; 22' Packwood; (yellow card) 61' Brown	Stadium: Fratton Park; Attendance: 13,558; Referee: Dean Whitestone

21 March 2015 38	AFC Wimbledon	1–0	Portsmouth	Kingston upon Thames
15:00 GMT	Chorley 6' (o.g.); Rigg (yellow card) 9'; Moore (yellow card) 89'; Akinfenwa (yellow card) 90+4'	Report	(yellow card) 60' Chorley; (yellow card) 67' Wallace; (yellow card) 90' Westcarr; (yellow card) 90+5' Kpekawa	Stadium: Kingsmeadow; Attendance: 4,485; Referee: Carl Berry

28 March 2015 39	Portsmouth	0–2	Shrewsbury Town	Portsmouth
15:00 BST	Nosworthy (yellow card) 17'; Dunne (yellow card) 65'	Report	25' 66' Grant	Stadium: Fratton Park; Attendance: 14,749; Referee: Lee Collins

4 April 2015 40	Carlisle United	2–2	Portsmouth	Carlisle
15:00 BST	Dempsey 2'; Wyke 90+5'	Report	38' Wallace; 45+3' Tubbs	Stadium: Brunton Park; Attendance: 5,230; Referee: Nigel Miller

6 April 2015 41	Portsmouth	2–1	Plymouth Argyle	Portsmouth
15:00 BST	Wallace 46'; Taylor 76'	Report	77' Lee; (yellow card) 80' (red card) 90' Nelson	Stadium: Fratton Park; Attendance: 16,581; Referee: Andy D'Urso

11 April 2015 42	Morecambe	3–1	Portsmouth	Morecambe
15:00 BST	Kenyon 10' 69'; Amond 90+3'	Report	85' Chaplin	Stadium: Globe Arena; Attendance: 2,065; Referee: Steve Martin

14 April 2015 43	Stevenage	1–0	Portsmouth	Stevenage
19:45 BST	Pett 6'; Walton (yellow card) 43'; Wells (yellow card) 79'	Report	(yellow card) 44' Devera; (yellow card) 81' Butler	Stadium: Broadhall Way; Attendance: 3,615; Referee: Chris Sarginson

18 April 2015 44	Portsmouth	0–1	Bury	Portsmouth
15:00 BST		Report	45' Lowe	Stadium: Fratton Park; Attendance: 14,569; Referee: James Adcock

24 April 2015 45	Mansfield Town	1–2	Portsmouth	Mansfield
15:00 BST	Sutton (red card) 2'; Brown (yellow card) 17'; Thomas 68'	Report	2' (pen.) Tubbs; 55' Wallace	Stadium: Field Mill; Attendance: 4,222; Referee: Graham Horwood

2 May 2015 46	Portsmouth	1–1	York City	Portsmouth
15:00 BST	Butler (yellow card) 80'; Tubbs 82'	Report	85' Halliday	Stadium: Fratton Park; Attendance: 17,254; Referee: Gary Lewis

=== FA Cup ===
The draw for the first round of the FA Cup was made on 27 October 2014.

9 November 2014 First round	Portsmouth	2–2	Aldershot Town	Portsmouth
14:00	Wallace 16' (pen.); Atangana (yellow card) 44'; Robinson (yellow card) 56' (red card) 82'; Holmes (yellow card) 73'; Hollands 81'	Report	(yellow card) 32' (goal) 68' Molesley; 45+1' Roberts	Stadium: Fratton Park; Attendance: 11,095; Referee: Paul Tierney

18 November 2014 First round	Aldershot Town	1–0	Portsmouth	Aldershot
19:45	Oastler (yellow card) 68'; Molesley 81'; Gibbs (yellow card) 85'	Report	(yellow card) 43' Atangana; (yellow card) 57' Robinson; (yellow card) 75' Whatmough	Stadium: Recreation Ground; Attendance: 5,374; Referee: Stuart Attwell

=== League Cup ===
The draw for the first round was made on 17 June 2014 at 10am. Portsmouth were drawn at home to Peterborough United.

13 August 2014 1st round	Portsmouth	1–0	Peterborough United	Portsmouth
19:45	Storey 12'	Report		Stadium: Fratton Park; Attendance: Brendan Malone; Referee: 7,726

27 August 2014 2nd round	Stoke City	3–0	Portsmouth	Stoke-on-Trent
19:45	Walters 16' 47'; Adam (yellow card) 85'; Crouch 90'	Report		Stadium: Britannia Stadium; Attendance: 10,312; Referee: Andy D'Urso

=== Football League Trophy ===
2 September 2014 1st round	Yeovil Town	1–3	Portsmouth	Yeovil
19:45	Martin (yellow card) 66'; Ralph 84'	Report	(yellow card) 12' Dunne; (yellow card) 36' Awford; (yellow card) 41' Wynter; 55' 72' Wallace; 74' Westcarr	Stadium: Huish Park; Attendance: 2,787; Referee: Kevin Johnson

7 October 2014 2nd round	Portsmouth	1–2	Northampton Town	Portsmouth
19:45	Taylor 36'; Holmes (yellow card) 89'	Report	38' Moyo; 55' Mohamed; (yellow card) 81' D'Ath; (yellow card) 90' Byrom	Stadium: Fratton Park; Attendance: 5,853; Referee: Graham Horwood
