= Bradley Tarbuck =

English footballer

Personal information
- Full name: Bradley Mark Tarbuck
- Date of birth: 6 November 1995 (age 31)
- Place of birth: Emsworth, England
- Height: 1.80 m (5 ft 11 in)
- Positions: Wing-back; winger

Team information
- Current team: Poole Town

Youth career
- ?–2012: Portsmouth

Senior career*
Years	Team	Apps	(Gls)
2012–2015	Portsmouth	2	(0)
2014–2015	→ Dartford (loan)	2	(0)
2015	→ Dorchester Town (loan)	16	(3)
2015–2016	Dorchester Town	32	(9)
2016–2020	Havant & Waterlooville	116	(10)
2016	→ Weymouth (loan)	2	(1)
2020–2026	Gosport Borough	162	(19)
2026–	Poole Town	0	(0)
- * Club domestic league appearances and goals as of 22:32, 4 August 2026 (UTC)

Bradley Mark Tarbuck (born 6 November 1995) is an English professional footballer who plays for Poole Town as either a left wing-back or a winger.

== Club career ==
=== Portsmouth ===
Tarbuck signed a two-year scholarship deal after spending many years in Portsmouth youth categories. On 14 August 2012 he made his professional debut, coming on as a 72nd minute substitute for Andy Higgins in a League Cup 3–0 defeat against Plymouth Argyle. He then spent the rest of the season in the academy, although he did play in a first-team friendly on 16 April 2013 scoring in a 2–1 win over Icelandic side IBV at Fratton Park.

Tarbuck returned to the Academy for the 2013–14 season; after scoring 12 goals and being the club's topscorer in the youth leagues, he was awarded a one-year professional deal on 9 May 2014. He made his league debut for Pompey on 1 November, replacing Miles Storey in the 82nd minute of a 3–0 home win over Carlisle United.

On 27 November 2014 Tarbuck joined Conference Premier side Dartford on loan until January. He returned to Pompey at the end of the 2014–15 season, but was released on 18 May 2015.

=== Dorchester Town ===
On 30 January 2015, after appearing sparingly, Tarbuck moved to Dorchester Town on a one-month loan. On 26 February Tarbuck's loan was extended for another month, and he was named Dorchester's player of the month.

On 10 August 2015, Tarbuck signed a short-term deal at Dorchester Town, he later extended the deal until the end of the season.

=== Havant & Waterlooville ===
On 24 May 2016, Tarbuck left Dorchester and signed for Havant & Waterlooville. Converted to a left wing-back by manager Lee Bradbury, he was a key unit in the club's two consecutive promotions.

On 1 October 2018, Tarbuck extended his contract with Hawks until 2020.

== Career statistics ==
As of 10 October 2018

Appearances and goals by club, season and competition
Club	Season	League			FA Cup		League Cup		Other		Total	
Club	Season	Division	Apps	Goals	Apps	Goals	Apps	Goals	Apps	Goals	Apps	Goals
Portsmouth	2012–13	League One	0	0	0	0	1	0	0	0	1	0
Portsmouth	2014–15	League Two	2	0	0	0	0	0	0	0	2	0
Portsmouth	Total		2	0	0	0	1	0	0	0	3	0
Dartford (loan)	2014–15	Conference Premier	2	0	1	0	—		2 (Note: One appearance in the FA Trophy and one in the Kent Senior Cup)	0	5	0
Dorchester Town (loan)	2014–15	SFL - Premier Division	16	3	0	0	—		2 (Note: Appearances in the FA Trophy)	0	18	3
Dorchester Town	2015–16	SFL - Premier Division	32	9	2	0	—		5 (Note: One appearance in the Southern League Cup, three in the FA Trophy and one in the Dorset Senior Cup)	0	39	9
Havant & Waterlooville	2016–17	IL - Premier League	30	6	0	0	—		5	0	35	6
Havant & Waterlooville	2017–18	National League South	37	1	3	0	—		5	4	45	5
Havant & Waterlooville	2018–19	National League	11	0	0	0	—		1	0	12	0
Havant & Waterlooville	Total		78	7	3	0	0	0	11	4	92	11
Weymouth (loan)	2016–17	SFL - Premier Division	2	1	0	0	—		1 (Note: Appearance in the Southern League Cup)	0	3	1
Career total			132	20	6	0	1	0	21	4	160	24
