= Jack Maloney =

English footballer (born 1994)

Personal information
- Full name: Jack Levi Maloney
- Date of birth: 8 December 1994 (age 31)
- Place of birth: Ryde, England
- Height: 6 ft 0 in (1.83 m)
- Positions: Winger; forward

Youth career
- Oakfield Youth FC
- 2004–2012: Portsmouth

Senior career*
Years	Team	Apps	(Gls)
2012–2015	Portsmouth	10	(0)
2013	→ Aldershot Town (loan)	2	(0)
2014	→ Lewes (loan)	6	(0)
2014–2015	→ Poole Town (loan)	9	(0)
2015	Bognor Regis Town	5	(0)
2015	Salisbury	6	(1)
2015–2023	Horndean	150+	(43+)
- * Club domestic league appearances and goals

Jack Levi Maloney (born 8 December 1994) is an English retired footballer who played as a midfielder or as a winger.

== Career ==
=== Portsmouth ===
Maloney was born in Ryde, and played in Oakfield Youth FC when the club was managed by his father, Carl. He joined Portsmouth Academy when he was nine, after impressing in a Portsmouth School Of Excellence placed in Ryde.

On 9 February 2011, Maloney signed a two-year scholarship with Pompey. On 14 August 2012, he made his debut in the League Cup in a 3–0 defeat at Plymouth Argyle coming on as a 34th-minute substitute for injured Ashley Westwood. Although he then spent most of the season with the academy, Maloney was again promoted to the first-team squad on 7 March 2013. He made his league debut for Portsmouth two days later, in a 2–0 win against Bury, coming off the bench to replace David Connolly in the dying minutes of the match.

On 23 August 2013, Maloney was loaned to Aldershot in a one-month deal. After being sparingly used, he returned to Portsmouth and appeared as a last-minute substitute in a 1–2 home loss against Southend United on 26 November.

On 7 February of the following year, Maloney joined Lewes also in a one-month loan. On 24 October 2014 he moved to Poole Town, again on loan.

On 17 March 2015 Maloney was released by Portsmouth, and signed for Bognor Regis Town just hours later.

In December 2015 Maloney signed for Horndean, making his debut in a 2–0 victory over Whitchurch United as a substitute for his brother Josh.

== Personal life ==
Jack's younger brother Leon Maloney also played first-team football for Portsmouth.

== Career statistics ==
As of end of 2016–17 season

Appearances and goals by club, season and competition
Club	Season	League			FA Cup		League Cup		Other		Total	
Club	Season	Division	Apps	Goals	Apps	Goals	Apps	Goals	Apps	Goals	Apps	Goals
Portsmouth	2012–13	League One	9	0	0	0	1	0	0	0	10	0
Portsmouth	2013–14	League Two	1	0	0	0	0	0	0	0	1	0
Portsmouth	2014–15	League Two	0	0	0	0	0	0	0	0	0	0
Portsmouth	Total		10	0	0	0	1	0	0	0	11	0
Aldershot Town (loan)	2013–14	Conference Premier	2	0	0	0	—		0	0	2	0
Lewes (loan)	2013–14	Isthmian League Premier Division	6	0	0	0	—		0	0	6	0
Poole Town (loan)	2014–15	Southern League Premier Division	9	0	0	0	—		8 (Note: Five appearances three goals in FA Trophy, two appearances one goal in Southern Football League Cup, one appearance one goal in Dorset Senior Cup)	5	17	5
Bognor Regis Town	2014–15	Isthmian League Premier Division	5	0	0	0	—		0	0	5	0
Salisbury	2015–16	Wessex League Premier Division	6	1	—		—		6 (Note: Three appearances one goal in FA Vase, two appearances in Wiltshire Senior Cup, one appearance in Salisbury Hospitals Cup)	1	12	2
Horndean	2015–16 (Note: The Full Time website has incorrectly double-counted statistics from the Hampshire Senior Cup game against Totton & Eling (in which Maloney played and scored))	Wessex League Premier Division	22	3	0	0	—		3 (Note: Two appearances one goal in Hampshire Senior Cup, one appearance in Portsmouth Senior Cup)	1	25	4
Horndean	2016–17	Wessex League Premier Division	41	16	1	0	—		6 (Note: Two appearances two goals in FA Vase, three appearances one goal in Hampshire Senior Cup, one appearance in Portsmouth Senior Cup)	3	48	19
Horndean	Total		63	19	1	0	—		9	4	73	23
Career total			101	20	1	0	1	0	23	10	126	30

== Honours ==
Salisbury

- Wessex League Premier Division: 2015–16
