= Horndean F.C. =

Association football club in England

Coordinates: 50°55′01.51″N 1°00′21.98″W

Horndean
- Full name: Horndean Football Club
- Nickname: The Deans
- Founded: 1887
- Ground: The Stanley Chase Stadium, Horndean
- Capacity: 2,000
- Chairman: Mick Catlin
- Manager: Kevin Adair
- League: Wessex League Premier Division
- 2025–26: Isthmian League South Central Division, 21st of 22 (relegated)
Home colours	Away colours

Horndean F.C. is an English football club based in Horndean, near Portsmouth in Hampshire. The club are currently members of the Wessex League Premier Division and play at the Stanley Chase Stadium on Five Heads Road, Horndean.

== History ==
The club was established in 1887 and played their first match on 27 October against Red Star from Havant. They initially played at Blendworth Hill before moving to their current ground.

The club only played friendly matches until World War I, after which they joined the Waterlooville & District League, They won the league title in 1926–27, 1929–30, 1930–31 and 1931–32. They went on to join the Portsmouth League, winning Division Two in 1953–54. They were later promoted to the Premier Division, which they won in 1968–69, 1969–70 and 1970–71.

In 1972 they moved up to Division Four of the Hampshire League. By the mid-1980s they had reached Division One, and became founder members of the Wessex League in 1986. The Deans struggled to make an impact on the league and in nine seasons never once managed to finish in the top half. After finishing bottom of the league in 1994–95, they were relegated back to the Hampshire League, where they remained until rejoining the Wessex League as founder members of the new Division Two in 2004.

In 2010–11 they were promoted to the Premier Division after finishing as runners-up in Division One. In October 2015 long serving manager David Carter left the club and on Wednesday 21 October 2015 Portsmouth Academy Coach Craig Pearce and Simon Chamberlain were appointed as successors. Craig Pearce and Simon Chamberlain took the team to fifth place, Horndean's highest ever position in the Sydenham's Wessex premier league.

At the start of the 2016–2017 season Horndean FC saw the arrival of Michael Birmingham, Dutchy Holland, Jason Manna, and Matthew Driver. The season finished with Horndean FC in 6th place in the Sydenham's Wessex Premier division. The 2017-2018 Season saw the first team finish in 4th place, in 2018-2019 the team under Michael Birmingham finished second, its highest ever position in the Sydenham's Wessex premier League.

The club were promoted to the Isthmian League for the first time as Champions in the 2022–23 season of the Sydenham's Wessex League Premier Division. The 2022–23 season was rounded off by beating Fareham Town F.C in the final of the Portsmouth Senior Cup at Portsmouth Football Club's Fratton Park. The title and cup winning squad was: Cameron Scott, Ellis Grant, Robbie Taw, Fuzz Kanjanda, James Crane, Brandon Miller, Luke Dempsey, Chad Field, Ethan Robb, Eddie Wakley, Tom Jeffes, Ben Anderson, Ash Howes, Liam Kimber, Sam Hookey, Tommy Tierney, Tommy Scutt, Ethan Gee, Rudi Blankson, Connor Duffin, Zack Willet & Harry Jackson.

Horndean FC's first season at the step 4 level resulted in them finishing in 14th place with 43 points in the Isthmian League South East Division. The Dean's would go on to win 12 games, draw 7 games and lose 19 games. Ahead of the 2023–2024 season, it would be decided that Horndean FC would be transferred to the Isthmian League South Central Division.

In their second season at step 4 level, the Dean's finished in 17th place in the Isthmian League South Central Division with 43 points. The Dean's would go on to win 11 games, draw 10 games and lose 21 games. On the 18th December 2024, Michael Birmingham left Horndean FC to take up the managerial position at Bognor Regis Town FC; Shaun Hale was appointed manager of Horndean FC shortly after.

== Ground ==
Horndean play their home games at Five Heads Park, Five Heads Road, Horndean PO8 9NZ. The ground was fully enclosed in 1981. In 1986 a 50-seater stand was added and a new building housing changing rooms and hospitality facilities was constructed inside the ground, to meet Wessex League standards. Previously the changing rooms had been in the social club, on the other side of the car park. The ground seating has been increased significantly in order to meet ground grading criteria.

== Honours ==
- Cup Competitions
  - Portsmouth Junior Cup Champions 1964–65
  - Portsmouth Senior Cup Champions 1975–76, 2007–08, 2009–10, 2010–11, 2022–23
  - Portsmouth Senior Cup Runners Up 1996–97, 2003–04, 2004–05
  - Russell-Cotes Cup Runners Up 2014–15
  - Wessex League Cup Runners Up 1986–87
- Hampshire League
  - Division Two Champions 1979–80
  - Division Three Champions 1975–76
  - Division Four Champions 1974–75
- Portsmouth League
  - Premier Division Champions 1968–69, 1969–70, 1970–71
  - Division Two Champions 1953–54
- Waterlooville & District League
  - Champions 1926–27, 1929–30, 1930–31, 1931–32
- Wessex League
  - Premier Division Champions 2022–23
  - Premier Division Runners Up 2018–19
  - Division One Runners Up 2010–11

== Current squad ==
Note: Flags indicate national team as defined under FIFA eligibility rules; some limited exceptions apply. Players may hold more than one non-FIFA nationality.

No.	Pos.	Nation	Player
—	GK	ENG	Cameron Scott
—	GK	ENG	Daniel Blackburn
—	DF	ENG	Robbie Taw
—	DF	ENG	Cade Dyer
—	DF	ENG	Jay Williams
—	DF	ENG	Horatio Fowler
—	DF	ENG	Ethan Robb
—	MF	ENG	Aaron O'Brien
—	MF	ENG	Josh Salmon
—	MF	ENG	Ryan Keates
—	MF	ENG	Landon Carmichael
—	MF	ENG	Waledin Ahmad
—	MF	ENG	Casey Bartlett-Scott
—	MF	ENG	Reece Mather
—	MF	ENG	Liam Callaghan
—	MF	ENG	Tommy Scutt (Captain)
—	FW	ENG	Daniel Sibley
—	FW	ENG	Rudi Blankson
—	FW	ENG	Brandon Chebby
—	FW	ENG	Zack Willett
—	FW	ENG	Billy Allcock
—	FW	ENG	Harry Jackson

== Staff ==
- 1st Team Manager – Kevin Adair
- 1st Team Assistant Manager – Vacant
- 1st Team Head Coach - Elliot Ottaway
- 1st Team Strength & Conditioning Coach - Gareth Watkins
- 1st Team Coach/ Analyst - Jack Fletcher
- 1st Team Goalkeeper Coach – Luke Redhead
- 1st Team Physiotherapist - Bobbie Williams

== Notable former players ==
Note: Flags indicate national team as defined under FIFA eligibility rules; some limited exceptions apply. Players may hold more than one non-FIFA nationality.

No.	Pos.	Nation	Player
—	GK	ENG	Alan Knight (footballer)
—	DF	ENG	Robbie Pethick
—	MF	ENG	Jack Maloney
—	FW	ENG	Ashley Harris

== Records ==
- Most goals in a season: Frank Bryson – 83 in 1931–32
- Most goals: Frank Bryson – 348
- Best performance in FA Cup: 2nd qualifying round in 2023–24
- Best performance in FA Trophy: 3rd qualifying round in 2024–25
- Best performance in FA Vase: 3rd round in 2012–13
- Highest attendance: 1359 Vs Portland United F.C. 25 April 2023
