= George Colson =

English-born Welsh footballer

Personal information
- Full name: George Peter Colson
- Date of birth: 24 October 1993 (age 33)
- Place of birth: Cowes, England
- Position: Right back

Team information
- Current team: Cowes Sports

Youth career
- 2003–2012: Portsmouth

Senior career*
Years	Team	Apps	(Gls)
2012–2013	Portsmouth	0	(0)
2012–2013	→ Dorchester Town (loan)	2	(0)
2013	→ Bashley (loan)	8	(0)
2013–2014	Bashley	10	(2)
2014	Fareham Town	14	(1)
2014–2015	Newport IW	28	(2)
2015–2019	Salisbury	102	(10)
2021–	Cowes Sports		

International career
2008–2009	Wales U16	3	(0)
- * Club domestic league appearances and goals

George Peter Colson (born 24 October 1993) is a footballer who plays for English club Cowes Sports. Mainly a right back, he can also play as a midfielder. Born in England, he has represented Wales at youth international level.

== Career ==
=== Portsmouth and loans ===
Colson signed a two-year scholarship with Portsmouth on 15 July 2010. On 26 June 2012, he signed a one-year professional deal.

On 14 August 2012, he made his debut in the League Cup in a 3–0 defeat at Plymouth Argyle.

On 21 November 2012, Colson joined Dorchester Town on an initial month-long loan, alongside Dan Thompson. He made his debut in a Dorset Senior Cup match against Wimborne Town a game which Colson scored in, the fixture ended 3–2 to Wimborne. Colson's league debut was in a 2–2 draw on 2 January against struggling Truro City. His last involvement for the Magpies was as an unused substitute in a 1–0 win over Dover Athletic.

On 23 January 2013 Colson joined Southern League Premier Division side Bashley on a month's loan joining up with fellow Portsmouth winger Elliot Wheeler. In March, he returned to Portsmouth, and after being told that his contract would not be renewed, Colson secured a trial at Stoke City. He then was released at the end of the season.

=== Bashley ===
Colson signed permanently for Bashley on 24 September 2013, after a good loan spell at the club. In January 2014 Colson Left the club

=== Fareham Town / Newport IW ===
According to their official website, Colson signed for Newport IW on 1 November 2014, after a short stint at Fareham Town.

=== Salisbury ===
On 27 July 2015, Colson joined Salisbury. On 31 May 2018, after being previously released, he re-joined the club. On 10 October 2019 it was confirmed that Calson had cancelled his Salisbury FC contract and registration by mutual consent.

=== Chiropractor ===
George is a qualified McTimoney Chiropractor. George is practicing at Wootton Chiropractic Clinic, on the Isle of Wight.

== International career ==
Colson has played for the Wales national under-16 football team.
