= Alan Knight (footballer, born 1961) =

English football player and manager (1961–2026)

Alan Knight MBE
Personal information
- Full name: Alan Edward Knight
- Date of birth: 3 July 1961
- Place of birth: Balham, London, England
- Date of death: 1 September 2026 (aged 65)
- Position: Goalkeeper

Senior career*
Years	Team	Apps	(Gls)
1978–2000	Portsmouth	683	(0)
2001	Havant & Waterlooville	3	(0)
2003–2004	Portsmouth	0	(0)
2006–2007	Dorchester Town	0	(0)
2009	Horndean	0	(0)
Total		686	(0)

International career
1979	England Youth	3	(0)
1983	England U21	2	(0)

Managerial career
- 2009: Horndean
- 2011–2012: Dorchester Town
- * Club domestic league appearances and goals

Alan Edward Knight MBE (3 July 1961 – 1 September 2026) was an English professional football player and manager. He held the record for the most appearances for a single club by a goalkeeper, having played 683 league games (and 801 games overall) for Portsmouth between 1978 and 2000; this superseded Peter Bonetti's record of exactly 600 goalkeeping appearances for Chelsea. He helped Portsmouth reach the 1992 FA Cup semi-final, which they lost on a penalty shootout to Liverpool.

In addition to his goalkeeping record, he was the second-longest serving Portsmouth player of all time behind Jimmy Dickinson. He was capped at under-21 international level, but was never selected for the full England squad.

== Early life and education ==
Knight was born in Balham, London on 3 July 1961. He attended Henry Cavendish Primary School in Balham and Ernest Bevin School in Tooting.

== Playing career ==
Knight joined Portsmouth as an apprentice at the age of 14 and signed a professional contract with the club in 1977. He went on to make his debut for the club a year later, keeping a clean sheet in a 2–0 Football League Third Division win against Rotherham United with Portsmouth's relegation to the fourth tier of English football already confirmed. Knight served as reserve goalkeeper to Peter Mellor for the next three seasons, making eight appearances during Pompey's 1979–80 promotion season, before establishing himself as the team's first choice goalkeeper during the 1981–82 season where he was named the fans' player of the season for the first time. Knight was a member of the team that won the Third Division championship in 1982–83 and was given a debut for the England U21 team in a 1984 UEFA European Under-21 Championship qualifier against Greece at Portsmouth's ground Fratton Park. He made one further appearance for the England U21s against Hungary, before first choice goalkeeper Gary Bailey returned from injury. England went on to win the final tournament.

Following two near misses, Portsmouth achieved promotion to the First Division in 1986–87, meaning Knight would represent the club in all four divisions of The Football League. Portsmouth were relegated from the top flight after only one season, with Knight keeping a clean sheet in a 2–0 win over south coast rivals Southampton at The Dell one of the few highlights.

During the 1991–92 season, Knight was a part of the Portsmouth team that reached the FA Cup semi–final, losing to eventual winners Liverpool in a penalty shootout, with both teams unable to be separated after 240 minutes of football. The next year, Portsmouth missed out on promotion to the Premier League on goals scored (80 goals to West Ham United's 81).

His testimonial match took place in 1995 with a South Coast Derby against Southampton played in front of 18,000 fans at Fratton Park. Southampton won the match 5–1, with Knight scoring the only goal for the home side from the penalty spot.

After resisting competition from Estonian international goalkeeper Mart Poom and being named Portsmouth's player of the season for two consecutive seasons during the mid-1990s, Knight eventually found himself being phased out of the first team by first Terry Fenwick, and later Alan Ball, with the young goalkeeper Aaron Flahavan becoming first choice. However, Flahavan's inconsistent form and health issues saw Knight continue to appear for Portsmouth into his late 30s. He started for Portsmouth against eventual winners Chelsea in the 4–1 FA Cup quarter-final defeat at Fratton Park in March 1997, and appeared 25 times during the 1998–99 season keeping five clean sheets, most notably in a 1–0 FA Cup win away at Premier League club Nottingham Forest.

Knight made his final appearance at Fratton Park as a late substitute for Flahavan in a Football League Cup tie against Torquay United on 24 August 1999. His 800th appearance came as a substitute at Blackburn Rovers and saw fans in all corners of Ewood Park rising to applaud his appearance on the pitch. On 3 January 2000, at the age of 38, Knight played his last match for Portsmouth at Norwich City's Carrow Road, becoming the only player to appear for the club in four different decades.

In the 2001 New Year Honours, Knight was appointed a Member of the Order of the British Empire (MBE) for services to association football. He also had an honorary Master of Science degree, which he was awarded by the University of Portsmouth in 1996.

He played briefly for Havant & Waterlooville in 2001, making three appearances. In 2003–04, after injuries to Shaka Hislop and Harald Wapenaar, Knight was called on to the substitutes' bench for Portsmouth and was listed as a squad member, but was never actually called into action. Knight's last competitive game was at Horndean when he came on to replace the injured Matt Cole.

Knight was nicknamed The Legend by Portsmouth fans. His autobiography, entitled Legend, was published in September 2003 by Legendary Publishing.

== Coaching career ==
Knight worked as the goalkeeping coach at Portsmouth prior to his resignation in summer 2005.

Following this, Knight was named goalkeepers' coach for the American Major League Soccer team FC Dallas in 2006. The head coach at FC Dallas at the time was Knight's former Portsmouth teammate Colin Clarke.

Staying in the United States, he then ran football coaching clinics for B.E.S.T (British European Soccer Tuition) in the USA. The B.E.S.T patron of honour was Knight's former Portsmouth manager and World Cup winner, the late Alan Ball.

On 12 December 2006, it was announced that Knight was named as the goalkeeping coach at AFC Bournemouth.

He also served as goalkeeping coach at Conference South Side Dorchester Town, where he was also a registered player, for the 2006/07 season; he appeared on the bench as a substitute, but did not make an appearance on the pitch.

On 8 October 2007, Knight was appointed goalkeeping coach at Havant & Waterlooville by the team's newly appointed manager Shaun Gale, a former teammate of Knight at Portsmouth.

In May 2009 Knight was named joint manager of Horndean of the Wessex League Division One. From then until 10 December 2009, Knight was registered as a player, however did not make a first-team appearance in the Wessex League. During his time as joint-manager, Horndean recorded 10 wins, 1 draw and 7 losses.

Knight joined Aldershot Town as a goalkeeping coach in December 2009. In July 2011 he left Aldershot for a coaching job at Havant & Waterlooville, but he left this position to return to Dorchester as first team manager on 29 November 2011. He left the club in April 2012 citing work commitments.

On 25 January 2013, he was appointed Portsmouth's Goalkeeping Coach until the end of the season.

== Personal life and death ==
Knight was awarded the honour of Freedom of the City of Portsmouth on 5 May 2025 at Fratton Park.

Knight died of prostate cancer on 1 September 2026, aged 65.

== Honours ==
Portsmouth

- Football League Third Division: 1982–83

== Book sources ==
- Mike Neasom, Mick Cooper & Doug Robinson (1984). Pompey: The History of Portsmouth Football Club. Milestone Publications. ISBN 0-903852-50-0.
