= Miles Storey =

English footballer

Personal information
- Full name: Miles James Storey
- Date of birth: 4 January 1994 (age 32)
- Place of birth: West Bromwich, England
- Position: Forward

Team information
- Current team: Colne

Youth career
- Wolverhampton Wanderers
- Coventry City
- 2010–2012: Swindon Town

Senior career*
Years	Team	Apps	(Gls)
2011–2016	Swindon Town	34	(4)
2013	→ Salisbury City (loan)	3	(0)
2014	→ Shrewsbury Town (loan)	6	(0)
2014–2015	→ Portsmouth (loan)	17	(2)
2015	→ Newport County (loan)	18	(2)
2015–2016	→ Inverness Caledonian Thistle (loan)	30	(11)
2016–2017	Aberdeen	15	(2)
2017–2019	Partick Thistle	64	(4)
2019–2021	Inverness Caledonian Thistle	47	(6)
2021–2023	Hereford	71	(10)
2023–2024	Curzon Ashton	23	(1)
2024	→ Bury (loan)	4	(0)
2024	Clitheroe	4	(0)
2024–	Colne	18	(1)

International career
2012	England U19	1	(0)
- * Club domestic league appearances and goals as of 12:19, 13 August 2025 (UTC)

Miles James Storey (born 4 January 1994) is an English footballer who plays as a forward for North West Counties League Division One North club Colne.

Originally from the West Midlands, Storey began his professional career at Swindon Town. Although he did not become a main part of Swindon's set-up at the time, Storey was sent on loan to numerous clubs such as Portsmouth, Newport County and Inverness Caledonian Thistle. His goal-scoring form in the Scottish Premiership attracted more interest and in May 2016 Storey signed for Aberdeen, before moving to Partick Thistle in August 2017.

== Career ==
=== Swindon Town ===
Storey was born in West Bromwich and started his football education with Wolverhampton Wanderers but was released and whilst playing for Sedgley Lions under 15s in Division 3 – was spotted by Mick Elliott MBE who was the head of recruitment at Coventry City. He signed for Coventry City but after one full season was not offered a scholarship and was released. Again without a club, Elliott took Storey to Swindon Town for a trial game where he impressed the coaches and was handed a two-year scholarship. During his first season as a scholar at Swindon, he impressed and helped Paul Bodin's youth side to win their third successive season.

After Swindon Town manager Paul Hart was dismissed as manager in April 2011, Bodin was installed as caretaker boss. Bodin brought Storey into the first team set-up for the club's home fixture against Oldham Athletic. He made his debut as a 78th minute substitute, replacing on-loan forward Calvin Andrew in a 0–2 loss.

On 30 October 2012, Storey scored twice against Premier League side Aston Villa in the League Cup, to level the score at 2–2, before Christian Benteke scored a late winner to send Aston Villa through 3–2.

On 6 May 2013, Storey missed a penalty in a shoot-out in the play-off semi-final against Brentford, as Swindon lost 5–4 on penalties, after the tie had finished 4–4 on aggregate. He was handed his first start on 10 August, and provided an assist for the game's winner against Stevenage.

On 5 October 2013, it was announced that Storey had joined Conference Premier side Salisbury City on a month's loan deal. He made his debut on the same day in a 2–1 win against Wrexham.

On 21 December, Storey returned to first team action for Swindon, and after coming off the bench in the 71st minute to replace Ryan Harley in a Football League One home clash against his former side Coventry City, he scored the winner 15 minutes later.

On 14 February 2014, Storey joined fellow League One side Shrewsbury Town in a one-month loan. On 10 July, he moved to League Two side Portsmouth, also in a temporary deal.

On 30 January 2015, Storey joined Newport County on an initial one-month loan. He made his debut for Newport on 31 January versus Shrewsbury Town as a second-half substitute. The loan was subsequently extended to the end of the 2014–15 season. He scored his first goal for Newport on 28 February 2015 in a 1–0 win against Burton Albion.

==== Inverness Caledonian Thistle (loan) ====
Storey joined Scottish Premiership club Inverness Caledonian Thistle during the 2015–16 summer transfer window on loan until January. He scored his first goal for the club on his debut against Heart of Midlothian in a 2–0 victory. In January 2016, his loan was extended until the end of the season.

=== Aberdeen ===
On 17 May 2016, Storey agreed to join Aberdeen when his contract with Swindon expired in the summer of 2016. He scored his first goal for Aberdeen on 20 August 2016, in a 2–1 win against Partick Thistle.

=== Partick Thistle ===
Storey moved to Partick Thistle for an undisclosed fee on 11 August 2017, signing a two-year contract. Storey scored his first goal for Thistle with a 92nd-minute winner in a 2–1 home win over Dundee. In May 2018, it was apparent that his contract would not be renewed by the club. However, in July 2018, Alan Archibald extended Storey's contract with the Maryhill side with a revised one-year contract. Storey was released by the club in May 2019 after a disappointing season in the Championship.

=== Return to Inverness Caledonian Thistle ===
For the start of the 2019/20 season, Storey rejoined Inverness on a permanent contract. Storey netted his first goal back at the club in a 2–1 win against Arbroath. Storey spent the first stage of the 2020/21 season out injured but returned to the team in November 2020. Storey scored his first goal of the season in a 3–0 away win in the league, over Queen of The South.

=== English Non-League ===
Storey signed for National League North side Hereford on 24 June 2021. He made 72 appearances and scored 10 goals before being released at the end of the 2022–23 season.

Following his release by Hereford, Storey remained in the National League North by signing for Curzon Ashton on 26 May 2023, becoming their first signing of the summer. On 1 March 2024, he joined North West Counties League Premier Division club Bury on a 28-day loan. He was released by Curzon Ashton in May 2024.

On 18 June 2024, Storey joined Northern Premier League Division One West club Clitheroe. In December, he moved on to North West Counties League Premier Division club Colne.

== International career ==
On 13 November 2012, Storey made his England under-19 debut in a 1–0 win against Finland.

== Career statistics ==
As of match played 9 August 2025

Appearances and goals by club, season and competition
Club	Season	League			National cup (Note: Includes FA Cup, Scottish Cup)		League cup (Note: Includes Football League Cup, Scottish League Cup)		Other		Total	
Club	Season	Division	Apps	Goals	Apps	Goals	Apps	Goals	Apps	Goals	Apps	Goals
Swindon Town	2010–11	League One	2	0	0	0	0	0	0	0	2	0
Swindon Town	2011–12	League Two	4	0	0	0	0	0	0	0	4	0
Swindon Town	2012–13	League One	8	1	0	0	2	2	1 (Note: Appearance in the League One play-offs)	0	11	3
Swindon Town	2013–14	League One	18	3	0	0	2	0	0	0	20	3
Swindon Town	2014–15	League One	0	0	0	0	0	0	0	0	0	0
Swindon Town	2015–16	League One	2	0	0	0	0	0	0	0	2	0
Swindon Town	Total		34	4	0	0	4	2	1	0	39	6
Salisbury City (loan)	2013–14	Conference Premier	3	0	0	0	0	0	0	0	3	0
Shrewsbury Town (loan)	2013–14	League One	6	0	0	0	0	0	0	0	6	0
Portsmouth (loan)	2014–15	League Two	17	2	2	0	2	1	1 (Note: Appearance in the Football League Trophy)	0	22	3
Newport County (loan)	2014–15	League Two	18	2	0	0	0	0	0	0	18	2
Inverness; Caledonian; Thistle (loan)	2015–16	Scottish Premiership	30	11	5	1	2	1	0	0	37	13
Aberdeen	2016–17	Scottish Premiership	14	1	1	0	1	0	2 (Note: Appearances in the Europa League)	0	18	1
Aberdeen	2017–18	Scottish Premiership	1	1	0	0	1	0	1	0	3	1
Aberdeen	Total		15	2	1	0	2	0	3	0	21	2
Partick Thistle	2017–18	Scottish Premiership	34	2	0	0	0	0	1 (Note: Appearance in the Premiership play-offs)	0	35	2
Partick Thistle	2018–19	Scottish Championship	30	2	3	0	4	1	0	0	37	3
Partick Thistle	Total		64	4	3	0	4	1	1	0	72	5
Inverness; Caledonian; Thistle	2019–20	Scottish Championship	27	3	3	0	4	2	0	0	34	5
Inverness; Caledonian; Thistle	2020–21	Scottish Championship	20	3	3	0	3	0	0	0	26	3
Inverness; Caledonian; Thistle	Total		47	6	6	0	7	2	0	0	60	8
Hereford	2021–22	National League North	32	7	1	0	—		0	0	33	7
Hereford	2022–23	National League North	40	3	2	1	—		1 (Note: Appearance(s) in FA Trophy)	0	43	4
Hereford	Total		72	10	3	1	—		1	0	76	11
Curzon Ashton	2023–24	National League North	23	1	1	0	—		4 (Note: Two appearances in FA Trophy; two appearances in Manchester Premier Cup)	0	28	1
Bury (loan)	2023–24	NWCFL Premier Division	7	0	—		—		0	0	7	0
Clitheroe	2024–25	NPL Division One West	4	0	2	0	—		4 (Note: Three appearances in FA Trophy; one appearance in Lancashire FA Challenge Trophy)	0	10	0
Colne	2024–25	NWCFL Premier Division	16	0	—		—		0	0	16	0
Colne	2025–26	NWCFL Division One North	2	1	0	0	—		0	0	2	1
Colne	Total		18	1	0	0	—		0	0	18	1
Career total			358	43	23	2	21	7	15	0	417	52
