= Ashley Harris =

English footballer (born 1993)

Personal information
- Full name: Ashley Grant Harris
- Date of birth: 9 December 1993 (age 32)
- Place of birth: Waterlooville, England
- Height: 5 ft 8 in (1.73 m)
- Position: Forward

Youth career
- 2002–2012: Portsmouth

Senior career*
Years	Team	Apps	(Gls)
2012–2014	Portsmouth	32	(3)
2013	→ Havant & Waterlooville (loan)	2	(0)
2013	→ Chelmsford City (loan)	3	(0)
2014	→ Bognor Regis Town (loan)	6	(0)
2014–2015	Gosport Borough	0	(0)
2014–2015	→ Horndean (dual contract)	5	(3)
2016–2017	Moneyfields	11	(2)
2021	AFC Portchester	3	(0)
2023–2024	Bosham	19	(20)
2024	AFC Portchester	2	(0)
2024	Infinity	5	(1)
- * Club domestic league appearances and goals as of 10:43, 10 October 2025 (UTC)

Ashley Grant Harris (born 9 December 1993) is an English footballer who plays for as forward.

== Early life ==
Harris was born in Waterlooville, Hampshire and attended Purbrook Junior School.

== Club career ==
=== Portsmouth ===
Harris started his career with Portsmouth and signed two-year scholarship in July 2010. He progressed through reserve and academy sides and made his senior competitive debut on 20 March 2012 as a substitute for David Norris and nearly scored in a 4–1 victory against Birmingham City in a Championship fixture.

His second appearance was also as a substitute, he came on for Luke Varney in the 46th minute in a 4–3 victory over Doncaster Rovers, a result which relegated Doncaster. Harris got his first competitive start against Derby County, with Portsmouth relegated following the result.

Harris signed a two-year professional contract at Portsmouth in July 2012. He scored his first goal for the club on 25 August 2012, in a 4–2 defeat to Carlisle United. He then scored the opening goal of the game against Crawley, Portsmouth went on to win 3–0.

On 12 September 2013, Harris was loaned to Havant & Waterlooville. A month later, he joined Chelmsford City in the same predicament.

On 4 March 2014, Harris joined Bognor Regis Town on a one-month loan. On 9 May 2014, he was released by Pompey along with 8 other players.

On 10 October 2014, Harris signed with Conference South side Gosport Borough until the end of the season. On 14 November Harris dual signed with Horndean He scored 3 goals for Horndean in a 5–2 win over Fareham Town FC in the Wessex League Cup.

In 2016, Harris signed for Moneyfields in the Wessex Football League.

In September 2021, Harris joined AFC Portchester.

After a period out of the game, Harris signed for Southern Combination Football League side Bosham, in the summer of 2023 - where he scored 20 goals in all competitions.

In September 2024, Harris joined Infinity early in the season after a brief spell back with AFC Portchester.

== Career statistics ==
As of 28 September 2023.

Club	Season	League		Cup		League Cup		Other^{[a]}		Total	
Club	Season	Apps	Goals	Apps	Goals	Apps	Goals	Apps	Goals	Apps	Goals
Portsmouth	2011–12	5	0	0	0	—		—		5	0
Portsmouth	2012–13	26	3	0	0	1	0	2	0	29	3
Portsmouth	2013–14	1	0	0	0	0	0	—		1	0
Portsmouth	Subtotal	32	3	0	0	1	0	2	0	35	3
Havant and Waterlooville (loan)	2013–14	2	0	0	0	0	0	0	0	2	0
Havant and Waterlooville (loan)	Subtotal	2	0	0	0	0	0	—		2	0
Chelmsford City (loan)	2013–14	3	0	0	0	0	0	0	0	3	0
Chelmsford City (loan)	Subtotal	3	0	0	0	0	0	—		3	0
Bognor Regis (loan)	2013–14	6	0	0	0	0	0	0	0	6	0
Bognor Regis (loan)	Subtotal	6	0	0	0	0	0	—		6	0
Gosport Borough	2014–15	0	0	0	0	0	0	1	0	1	0
Gosport Borough	Subtotal	0	0	0	0	0	0	1	0	1	0
Horndean	2014–15	2	3	0	0	0	0	2	3	4	6
Horndean	Subtotal	2	3	0	0	0	0	2	3	4	6
Moneyfields	2016–17	15	1	0	0	0	0	0	0	15	1
Moneyfields	Subtotal	15	1	0	0	0	0	0	0	15	1
Bosham	2023-24	20	18	3	2	0	0	0	0	23	20
Bosham	Subtotal	20	18	3	2	0	0	0	0	23	20
Career total		80	25	3	2	1	0	5	3	89	30

a. Includes other competitive competitions, including the Football League Trophy.
