= Darjan Curanović =

Slovenian footballer

Personal information
- Date of birth: 5 April 1986 (age 40)
- Place of birth: Kranj, SFR Yugoslavia
- Position: Goalkeeper

Team information
- Current team: SV St. Urban
- Number: 1

Youth career
- Zarica Kranj
- Triglav Kranj

Senior career*
Years	Team	Apps	(Gls)
2003–2004	Zarica Kranj	8	(0)
2004–2005	Triglav Kranj	3	(0)
2005–2006	Zarica Kranj	23	(0)
2006–2007	Šenčur	11	(1)
2007–2008	Olimpija Ljubljana	9	(0)
2008–2011	Šenčur	75	(0)
2011	Svoboda Ljubljana	13	(0)
2012–2015	Triglav Kranj	40	(0)
2015–2016	Annabichler SV	30	(1)
2016	Austria Klagenfurt	0	(0)
2017	SVG Bleiburg	9	(0)
2017–2018	Fužinar	29	(0)
2018–2019	Triglav Kranj	9	(0)
2019	Petrovac	0	(0)
2019–2020	Drava Ptuj	13	(0)
2020–2021	Zarica Kranj	7	(0)
2021–2022	Vrhnika	22	(0)
2022–	SV St. Urban	34	(0)
- * Club domestic league appearances and goals as of 4 September 2023

Darjan Curanović (born 5 April 1986) is a Slovenian footballer who plays as a goalkeeper for Austrian club SV St. Urban.

== Career ==
On 2 July 2012, it was announced that Curanović will have a trial at League One side Portsmouth, joining up with the squad in Spanish training camp. However, just before leaving for Spain, a club announced that they have financial problems and cancelled all further talks with him.

In July 2013 Curanović joined Leeds United on trial, as a replacement to injured Jamie Ashdown. However, nothing came of it, and he subsequently returned to Triglav Kranj.
