= 2013–14 Portsmouth F.C. season =

Portsmouth
2013–14 season
- Chairman: Pompey Supporters' Trust (PST)
- Manager: Guy Whittingham (until 25 November); Andy Awford (caretaker – from 25 November until 9 December); Richie Barker (from 9 December – until 27 March); Andy Awford (from 27 March)
- Stadium: Fratton Park
- League Two: 13th
- FA Cup: First round
- League Cup: First round
- League Trophy: Southern quarter-final
- Top goalscorer: League: Jed Wallace (7); All: Jed Wallace (7)
- Highest home attendance: 18,181 vs. Oxford Utd (3/8/13)
- Lowest home attendance: 13,387 vs. Accrington (25/2/14)
- Average home league attendance: 15,461
Home colours	Away colours	Third colours

The 2013–14 season was Portsmouth's first campaign back in the Football League Two after being relegated from the EFL Championship and League One in two successive seasons. This was the first time that Portsmouth played in the fourth tier of English football since the 1979–80 season.

== Players ==
=== Squad details ===
As of 3 May 2014

No.	Name	Pos.	Nat.	Place of birth	Date of birth (age)	Club apps	Club goals	Int. caps	Int. goals	Signed from	Date signed	Fee	Contract End
Goalkeepers
1	Phil Smith	GK	(England)	Harrow	14 December 1979 (aged 34)	5	0	–	–	Swindon Town	7 December 2012	Free	30 June 2014
40	Trevor Carson	GK	(Northern Ireland)	Killyleagh	5 March 1988 (aged 26)	39	0	–	–	Bury	3 October 2013	Loan	30 June 2014
Defenders
2	Yassin Moutaouakil	RB	(France)	Nice	18 July 1986 (aged 27)	35	0	–	–	Hayes & Yeading	24 January 2013	Free	30 June 2014
3	Bondz N'Gala	CB	(England)	London	13 September 1989 (aged 24)	31	3	–	–	Stevenage	2 August 2013	Free	30 June 2014
4	Danny East	RB/DM	(England)	Hessle	26 December 1991 (aged 22)	19	1	–	–	Hull City	9 May 2013	Free	30 June 2015
5	Joe Devera	CB/RB	(England)	Southgate	6 February 1987 (aged 27)	37	0	–	–	Swindon	14 May 2013	Free	30 June 2015
6	Sonny Bradley	CB	(England)	Hedon	13 September 1991 (aged 22)	38	2	–	–	Hull City	9 May 2013	Free	30 June 2015
14	Marcos Painter	LB/CB	(Republic of Ireland)	(England) Solihull	17 August 1986 (aged 27)	18	0	–	–	Brighton	15 August 2013	Free	30 June 2014
15	Daniel Alfei	RB	(Wales)	Swansea	23 February 1992 (aged 22)	15	0	–	–	Swansea City	2 January 2014	Loan	30 June 2014
17	Nicky Shorey	LB/CM	(England)	Romford	15 February 1981 (aged 33)	21	0	2	0	Bristol City	9 January 2014	Free	30 June 2014
22	Adam Webster	CB/RB	(England)	West Wittering	4 January 1995 (aged 19)	28	2	–	–	Academy	9 February 2011	Free	30 June 2014^{1}
26	Ben Chorley (c)	CB	(England)	Sidcup	30 September 1982 (aged 31)	12	0	–	–	Stevenage	20 January 2014	Free	30 June 2015
36	Jack Whatmough	CB	(England)	Gosport	19 August 1996 (aged 17)	12	0	–	–	Academy	19 August 2013	Free	30 June 2017
–	Joshua Warren	CB	(England)	Portsmouth	8 February 1995 (aged 19)	–	–	–	–	Academy	9 February 2011	Trainee	30 June 2014
–	Liam Triggs	RB	(England)	Ryde	31 October 1994 (aged 19)	–	–	–	–	Academy	9 February 2011	Trainee	30 June 2014
Midfielders
7	Andy Barcham	LW	(England)	Basildon	16 December 1986 (aged 27)	31	3	–	–	Scunthorpe United	20 May 2013	Free	30 June 2016
8	Romain Padovani	DM/CM	(France)	Nice	15 October 1989 (aged 24)	22	1	–	–	(France) AS Monaco	9 May 2013	Free	30 June 2015
11	Ricky Holmes	RW/SS	(England)	Rochford	19 June 1987 (aged 26)	45	2	–	–	Barnet	21 June 2013	Free	30 June 2015
13	Johnny Ertl	DM	(Austria)	Graz	13 November 1982 (aged 31)	71	1	7	0	Sheffield United	31 August 2012	Free	30 June 2016
16	Simon Ferry	CM	(Scotland)	Dundee	11 January 1988 (aged 26)	22	1	–	–	Swindon	25 July 2013	Free	30 June 2015
19	Wes Fogden	RW/LW	(England)	Brighton	12 April 1988 (aged 26)	19	2	–	–	Bournemouth	15 January 2014	Trainee	30 June 2015
29	Danny Hollands	CM	(England)	Ashford	6 November 1985 (aged 28)	7	6	–	–	Charlton	27 March 2014	Loan	30 June 2014
31	Therry Racon	CM	(Guadeloupe)	(France) Villeneuve	1 May 1984 (aged 30)	32	0	3	0	Millwall	3 October 2013	Free	30 June 2014
33	Ben Close	CM	(England)	Portsmouth	8 August 1996 (aged 17)	–	–	–	–	Academy	3 May 2014	Trainee	30 June 2014
35	Jed Wallace	CM/RW	(England)	Reading	26 March 1994 (aged 20)	71	13	–	–	Lewes	30 August 2011	Free	30 June 2014
–	Bradley Tarbuck	RW	(England)	Emsworth	6 November 1995 (aged 18)	1	0	–	–	Academy	6 July 2012	Trainee	30 June 2014
Forwards
10	Tom Craddock	ST	(England)	Darlington	14 October 1986 (aged 27)	11	1	–	–	Oxford	13 May 2013	Free	30 June 2015
18	Ryan Bird	ST	(England)	Slough	15 November 1986 (aged 27)	21	3	–	–	Burnham	23 July 2013	Free	30 June 2014
20	Ryan Taylor	ST	(England)	Rotherham	4 May 1988 (aged 25)	18	5	–	–	Bristol City	9 January 2014	Free	30 June 2015
23	Patrick Agyemang	ST	(Ghana)	(England) Walthamstow	29 September 1980 (aged 33)	59	8	2	1	Stevenage	4 May 2013	Free	30 June 2015
28	Michael Drennan	ST	(Republic of Ireland)	Kilkenny	2 February 1994 (aged 20)	10	3	–	–	Aston Villa	21 February 2014	Loan	30 June 2014
32	Jake Jervis	ST	(England)	Wolverhampton	17 September 1991 (aged 22)	18	5	–	–	(Turkey) Elazığspor	9 January 2014	Free	30 June 2014
Other
44	Rob Phillips		(England)		8 February 1970 (aged 44)	–	–	–	–	None	14 February 2014	Free	30 June 2014

^{1} Signed a new deal before the latest administration.

== Transfers ==
=== In ===
No.	Pos.	Nat.	Name	Age	EU	Moving from	Type	Transfer window	Ends	Transfer fee	Source
36	FW	(England)	Dan Thompson	18	EU	Bognor Regis Town	Loan Return	Summer	2013	Free	
38	DF	(Australia)	Alex Grant	19	EU	Havant & Waterlooville	Loan Return	Summer	2013	Free	
41	DF	(England)	Elliot Wheeler	19	EU	Sutton United	Loan Return	Summer	2013	Free	
−	DF	(England)	Joshua Warren	18	EU	Bognor Regis Town	Loan Return	Summer	2013	Free	
23	FW	(Ghana)	Patrick Agyemang	32	EU	Stevenage	Transfer	Summer	2015	Free	
−	DF	(England)	Liam Triggs	18	EU	Youth system	Promoted	Summer	2014	Free	
−	DF	(England)	Joshua Warren	18	EU	Youth system	Promoted	Summer	2014	Free	
−	MF	(England)	George Branford	18	EU	Youth system	Promoted	Summer	2014	Free	
6	DF	(England)	Sonny Bradley	21	EU	Hull City	Transfer	Summer	2015	Free	
4	DF	(England)	Danny East	21	EU	Hull City	Transfer	Summer	2015	Free	
8	MF	(France)	Romain Padovani	23	EU	Monaco (France)	Transfer	Summer	2015	Free	
10	FW	(England)	Tom Craddock	26	EU	Oxford United	Transfer	Summer	2015	Free	
5	DF	(England)	Joe Devera	26	EU	Swindon Town	Transfer	Summer	2015	Free	
25	GK	(England)	John Sullivan	25	EU	Charlton Athletic	Transfer	Summer	2015	Free	
7	MF	(England)	Andy Barcham	26	EU	Scunthorpe United	Transfer	Summer	2016	Free	
11	MF	(England)	Ricky Holmes	26	EU	Barnet	Transfer	Summer	2015	Free	
18	FW	(England)	Ryan Bird	25	EU	Burnham	Transfer	Summer	2014	Free	
16	MF	(Scotland)	Simon Ferry	25	EU	Swindon Town	Transfer	Summer	2015	Free	
3	DF	(England)	Bondz N'Gala	23	EU	Stevenage	Transfer	Summer	2013	Free	
14	DF	(Republic of Ireland)	Marcos Painter	26	EU	Brighton & Hove Albion	Transfer	Summer	2014	Free	
20	DF	(England)	Shaun Cooper	29	EU	Crawley Town	Transfer	Summer	2014	Free	
32	FW	(England)	John Marquis	21	EU	Millwall	Loan	During Season	2013	Free	
40	GK	(England)	Trevor Carson	25	EU	Bury	Loan	During Season	2014	Free	
31	MF	(Guadeloupe)	Therry Racon	29	EU	Free agent	Transfer	During Season	2013	Free	
15	MF	(England)	Gavin Mahon	36	EU	Free agent	Transfer	During Season	2013	Free	
33	DF	(England)	Dan Potts	19	EU	West Ham United	Loan	During Season	2013	Free	
15	DF	(Wales)	Daniel Alfei	21	EU	Swansea City (Wales)	Loan	Winter	2014	Free	
17	DF	(England)	Nicky Shorey	32	EU	Bristol City	Transfer	Winter	2014	Free	
32	FW	(England)	Jake Jervis	22	EU	Free agent	Transfer	Winter	2014	Free	
20	FW	(England)	Ryan Taylor	25	EU	Bristol City	Transfer	Winter	2015	Free	
19	MF	(England)	Wes Fogden	25	EU	Bournemouth	Transfer	Winter	2015	Free	
26	DF	(England)	Ben Chorley	31	EU	Stevenage	Transfer	Winter	2015	Free	
29	MF	(France)	Toumani Diagouraga	26	EU	Brentford	Loan	During Season	2014	Free	
28	FW	(Republic of Ireland)	Michael Drennan	20	EU	Aston Villa	Loan	During Season	2014	Free	
33	MF	(Scotland)	Rhys McCabe	21	EU	Sheffield Wednesday	Loan	During Season	2014	Free	
29	MF	(England)	Danny Hollands	28	EU	Charlton Athletic	Loan	During Season	2014	Free	
18	FW	(England)	Ryan Bird	26	EU	Cambridge United	Loan Return	During Season	2014	Free	
22	DF	(England)	Adam Webster	19	EU	Aldershot Town	Loan Return	During Season	2014	Free	

Total spending: ▼£0

==== Trialists ====
No.	Pos.	Nat.	Name	Age	EU	Moving from	Type	Transfer window	Ends	Transfer fee	Source
—	FW	(England)	Ryan Bird	25	EU	Burnham	Trial/Transfer	Summer	Trial	Free	
—	MF	(Northern Ireland)	Michael Bryan	23	EU	Corby Town	Trial	Summer	Trial	Free	
—	DF	(England)	Bondz N'Gala	23	EU	Free agent	Trial/Transfer	Summer	Trial	Free	
—	DF	(England)	Shaun Cooper	29	EU	Free agent	Trial	Summer	Trial	Free	
—	DF	(Guinea-Bissau)	Arnaud Mendy	23	EU	Luton Town	Trial	Summer	Trial	Free	
—	GK	(England)	Nathan Ashmore	22	EU	Gosport Borough	Trial	Summer	Trial	Free	
—	MF	(England)	Mickey Spillane	24	EU	Free agent	Trial	Summer	Trial	Free	
—	DF	(England)	Will Spetch	22	EU	Poole Town	Trial	Summer	Trial	Free	
—	FW	(England)	Jake Jervis	22	EU	Free agent	Trial	Summer	Trial	Free	

=== Out ===
No.	Pos.	Nat.	Name	Age	EU	Moving to	Type	Transfer window	Transfer fee	Source
3	DF	(England)	Shaun Cooper	29	EU	Crawley Town	Loan Return	Summer	Free	
19	MF	(Guadeloupe)	Therry Racon	28	EU	Millwall	Loan Return	Summer	Free	
23	FW	(Ghana)	Patrick Agyemang	32	EU	Stevenage	Loan Return	Summer	Free	
16	DF	(Hungary)	Gábor Gyepes	31	EU	Videoton (Hungary)	Contract Ended	Summer	Free	
—	MF	(Wales)	James Hartson	18	EU	Free agent	Released	Summer	Free	
36	FW	(England)	Dan Thompson	18	EU	Hampton & Richmond	Released	Summer	Free	
37	MF	(Wales)	George Colson	19	EU	Bashley	Released	Summer	Free	
38	DF	(Australia)	Alex Grant	19	EU	Stoke City	Released	Summer	Free	
13	GK	(England)	Simon Eastwood	23	EU	Blackburn Rovers	Contract Ended	Summer	Free	
41	DF	(England)	Elliot Wheeler	19	EU	Stoke City	Contract Ended	Summer	Free	
20	FW	(England)	John Akinde	23	EU	Alfreton Town	Released	Summer	Free	
4	DF	(Nigeria)	Sam Sodje	34	EU	Free agent	Contract Ended	Summer	Free	
33	DF	(Portugal)	Ricardo Rocha	34	EU	Free agent	Contract Ended	Summer	Free	
6	MF	(Gibraltar)	Liam Walker	25	EU	CD San Roque (Spain)	Contract Ended	Summer	Free	
22	DF	(England)	Adam Webster	18	EU	Aldershot Town	Loan	Summer	Free	
31	MF	(England)	Jack Maloney	18	EU	Aldershot Town	Loan	Summer	Free	
24	MF	(England)	Nick Awford	18	EU	Gosport Borough	Loan	Summer	Free	
21	FW	(England)	Ashley Harris	19	EU	Havant & Waterlooville	Loan	During Season	Free	
18	FW	(England)	Ryan Bird	25	EU	Havant & Waterlooville	Loan	During Season	Free	
—	DF	(England)	Joshua Warren	18	EU	Chelmsford City	Loan	During Season	Free	
—	DF	(England)	Liam Triggs	18	EU	AFC Totton	Loan	During Season	Free	
—	MF	(England)	George Branford	18	EU	AFC Totton	Loan	During Season	Free	
24	MF	(England)	Nick Awford	18	EU	Chelmsford City	Loan	During Season	Free	
21	FW	(England)	Ashley Harris	19	EU	Chelmsford City	Loan	During Season	Free	
34	DF	(England)	Dan Butler	19	EU	Aldershot Town	Loan	During Season	Free	
1	GK	(England)	Phil Smith	33	EU	Dartford	Loan	During Season	Free	
32	FW	(England)	John Marquis	21	EU	Millwall	Loan Return	During Season	Free	
15	MF	(England)	Gavin Mahon	36	EU	Tamworth	Released	During Season	Free	
25	GK	(England)	John Sullivan	25	EU	Cambridge United	Loan	Winter	Free	
20	MF	(England)	Shaun Cooper	30	EU	Torquay United	Released	Winter	Free	
22	DF	(England)	Adam Webster	19	EU	Aldershot Town	Loan	Winter	Free	
18	FW	(England)	Ryan Bird	26	EU	Cambridge United	Loan	Winter	Free	
9	FW	(Republic of Ireland)	David Connolly	36	EU	Oxford United	Loan	Winter	Free	
30	MF	(England)	Jack Maloney	19	EU	Lewes	Loan	During Season	Free	
24	MF	(England)	Nick Awford	18	EU	Bognor Regis Town	Loan	During Season	Free	
21	FW	(England)	Ashley Harris	20	EU	Bognor Regis Town	Loan	During Season	Free	
34	DF	(England)	Dan Butler	19	EU	Aldershot Town	Loan	During Season	Free	
—	MF	(England)	George Branford	19	EU	Lewes	Loan	During Season	Free	
29	MF	(France)	Toumani Diagouraga	26	EU	Brentford	Loan Return	During Season	Free	
33	MF	(Scotland)	Rhys McCabe	21	EU	Sheffield Wednesday	Loan Return	During Season	Free	

Total gaining: ▲£0

=== Contracts ===
No.	Pos.	Nat.	Name	Age	Status	Contract length	Expiry date	Source
2	DF	(France)	Yassin Moutaouakil	26	Signed	1 year	June 2014	Portsmouth FC
1	GK	(England)	Phil Smith	33	Signed	1 year	June 2014	Portsmouth News
16	DF	(Hungary)	Gábor Gyepes	31	Rejected	Rejected	June 2013	Portsmouth News
24	MF	(England)	Nick Awford	18	Signed	Undisclosed	Undisclosed	Portsmouth News
30	MF	(England)	Jack Maloney	18	Signed	Undisclosed	Undisclosed	Portsmouth News
–	MF	(England)	George Branford	18	Signed	Undisclosed	Undisclosed	Portsmouth News
–	DF	(England)	Liam Triggs	18	Signed	Undisclosed	Undisclosed	Portsmouth News
–	DF	(England)	Joshua Warren	18	Signed	Undisclosed	Undisclosed	Portsmouth News
34	DF	(England)	Dan Butler	18	Signed	2 years	June 2015	Portsmouth FC
13	GK	(England)	Simon Eastwood	23	Rejected	Rejected	June 2013	Portsmouth News
9	FW	(Republic of Ireland)	David Connolly	35	Signed	2 years	June 2015	Portsmouth News
6	MF	(Gibraltar)	Liam Walker	25	Rejected	Rejected	June 2013	Portsmouth News
13	MF	(Austria)	Johnny Ertl	30	Signed	3 years	June 2016	Portsmouth News
36	DF	(England)	Jack Whatmough	17	Signed	3 years	June 2016	Portsmouth News
3	DF	(England)	Bondz N'Gala	23	Signed	6 months	January 2014	Portsmouth FC
3	DF	(England)	Bondz N'Gala	24	Signed	8 months	July 2014	Portsmouth FC
15	MF	(England)	Gavin Mahon	36	Signed	1 month	December 2013	Portsmouth FC
40	GK	(Northern Ireland)	Trevor Carson	25	Loan extension	6 months	June 2014	BBC Sport
31	MF	(France)	Therry Racon	29	Signed	6 months	June 2014	Portsmouth FC
14	DF	(Republic of Ireland)	Marcos Painter	27	Signed	1 month	February 2014	Portsmouth FC
15	DF	(England)	Daniel Alfei	21	Loan extension	6 months	June 2014	Portsmouth FC
14	DF	(Republic of Ireland)	Marcos Painter	27	Signed	6 months	June 2014	Portsmouth FC
29	MF	(France)	Toumani Diagouraga	26	Loan extension	3 months	June 2014	Portsmouth FC
28	FW	(Republic of Ireland)	Michael Drennan	20	Loan extension	3 months	June 2014	Portsmouth FC
36	DF	(England)	Jack Whatmough	17	Signed	3 years^{1}	June 2017	Portsmouth FC

- ^{1} According to Whatmough's Twitter account.

== Events ==
2013

- 24 April: Portsmouth appoint caretaker manager Guy Whittingham for permanent role, with a one-year contract.
- 25 April: Jed Wallace signed a one-year contract extension with Portsmouth.
- 29 April: Portsmouth announce partnership with Sondico.
- 1 May: Andy Awford refused an assistant manager role to stick with Academy.
- 2 May: Jed Wallace and Adam Webster receive an England U19 call up.
- 4 May: Patrick Agyemang becomes Portsmouth's first summer signing, with a two-year deal.
- 9 May: Portsmouth signs Sonny Bradley, Danny East and Romain Padovani.
- 13 May: Portsmouth signs Tom Craddock in a two-year deal.
- 14 May: Portsmouth signs Joe Devera in a two-year deal.
- 15 May: Portsmouth extends partnership with Jobsite until the end of the season.
- 16 May: Portsmouth signs John Sullivan in a two-year deal.
- 17 May: Portsmouth presents their new home kit for the season.
- 20 May: Portsmouth signs Andy Barcham in a three-year deal.
- 23 May: Portsmouth appoints Head of Sports Performance Steve Allen as assistant manager.
- 21 June: Portsmouth sign Ricky Holmes in a two-year deal.
- 26 June: Portsmouth strikes a one-year deal with University of Portsmouth, to use Langstone Campus facilities as training field.
- 8 July: Portsmouth appoints former player Alan McLoughlin as first team coach.
- 23 July: Portsmouth signs Ryan Bird in a one-year deal, after a trial with the club.
- 25 July: Portsmouth signs Simon Ferry in a two-year deal.
- 25 November: Guy Whittingham is sacked after a string of poor results and performances, and Andy Awford is elected caretaker.
- 9 December: Richie Barker is appointed the new Portsmouth manager, with Steve Coppell being appointed Director of Football.

2014

- 14 February: Portsmouth signs lifelong fan Rob Phillips until the end of the season, after Phillips won a Papa John's Sign For Your Club competition.
- 27 March: Richie Barker is sacked after a string of poor results and performances which left the club only two points above relegation, and Andy Awford is elected caretaker again.
- 1 May: After remaining six games unbeaten and leaving the club clear of relegation, Andy Awford is appointed as the new Portsmouth's permanent manager, signing a one-year contract.

== Player statistics ==
=== Squad stats ===
As of 3 May 2014

No.	Pos	Nat	Player	Total		League Two		FA Cup		League Cup		League Trophy	
No.	Pos	Nat	Player	Apps	Goals	Apps	Goals	Apps	Goals	Apps	Goals	Apps	Goals
1	GK	(England) ENG	Phil Smith	5	0	4	0	0	0	1	0	0	0
2	DF	(France) FRA	Yassin Moutaouakil	16	0	11+2	0	1	0	0	0	2	0
3	DF	(England) ENG	Bondz N'Gala	31	3	24+3	3	1	0	1	0	2	0
4	DF	(England) ENG	Danny East	19	1	12+3	1	0+1	0	1	0	2	0
5	DF	(England) ENG	Joe Devera	37	0	33	0	1	0	1	0	2	0
6	DF	(England) ENG	Sonny Bradley	38	2	29+4	2	1	0	1	0	3	0
7	MF	(England) ENG	Andy Barcham	32	3	18+9	3	1	0	0+1	0	2+1	0
8	MF	(France) FRA	Romain Padovani	22	1	11+7	1	0	0	1	0	2+1	0
10	FW	(England) ENG	Tom Craddock	11	1	2+6	1	0	0	1	0	1+1	0
11	MF	(England) ENG	Ricky Holmes	45	2	31+9	2	0+1	0	1	0	3	0
13	MF	(Austria) AUT	Johnny Ertl	32	1	20+9	1	1	0	0	0	2	0
14	DF	(Republic of Ireland) IRL	Marcos Painter	18	0	17	0	0	0	0	0	1	0
15	DF	(Wales) WAL	Daniel Alfei	15	0	15	0	0	0	0	0	0	0
16	MF	(Scotland) SCO	Simon Ferry	22	1	19+1	1	0	0	0+1	0	1	0
17	DF	(England) ENG	Nicky Shorey	21	0	21	0	0	0	0	0	0	0
19	MF	(England) ENG	Wes Fogden	19	2	16+3	2	0	0	0	0	0	0
20	FW	(England) ENG	Ryan Taylor	18	5	15+3	5	0	0	0	0	0	0
22	DF	(England) ENG	Adam Webster	4	2	3+1	2	0	0	0	0	0	0
23	FW	(Ghana) GHA	Patrick Agyemang	44	5	24+17	4	1	0	1	0	0+1	1
26	DF	(England) ENG	Ben Chorley	12	0	12	0	0	0	0	0	0	0
28	FW	(Republic of Ireland) IRL	Michael Drennan	10	3	5+5	3	0	0	0	0	0	0
29	MF	(England) ENG	Danny Hollands	7	6	6+1	6	0	0	0	0	0	0
31	MF	(Guadeloupe) GLP	Therry Racon	16	0	12+4	0	0	0	0	0	0	0
32	FW	(England) ENG	Jake Jervis	15	4	12+3	4	0	0	0	0	0	0
33	MF	(England) ENG	Ben Close	0	0	0	0	0	0	0	0	0	0
35	MF	(England) ENG	Jed Wallace	47	7	37+6	7	1	0	1	0	2	0
36	DF	(England) ENG	Jack Whatmough	12	0	11+1	0	0	0	0	0	0	0
40	GK	(England) ENG	Trevor Carson	39	0	36	0	1	0	0	0	2	0
–	DF	(England) ENG	Joshua Warren	0	0	0	0	0	0	0	0	0	0
–	DF	(England) ENG	Liam Triggs	0	0	0	0	0	0	0	0	0	0
–	MF	(England) ENG	Bradley Tarbuck	0	0	0	0	0	0	0	0	0	0
Players on loan to other clubs:
9	FW	(Republic of Ireland) IRL	David Connolly	20	5	11+7	4	0+1	1	0	0	0+1	0
18	FW	(England) ENG	Ryan Bird	22	3	5+13	3	1	0	0+1	0	2	0
21	FW	(England) ENG	Ashley Harris	1	0	0+1	0	0	0	0	0	0	0
24	MF	(England) ENG	Nick Awford	0	0	0	0	0	0	0	0	0	0
25	GK	(England) ENG	John Sullivan	7	0	6	0	0	0	0	0	1	0
30	MF	(England) ENG	Jack Maloney	1	0	0+1	0	0	0	0	0	0	0
34	DF	(England) ENG	Dan Butler	2	0	1	0	0	0	1	0	0	0
–	MF	(England) ENG	George Branford	0	0	0	0	0	0	0	0	0	0
Players who have left the club after the start of the season:
15	MF	(England) ENG	Gavin Mahon	2	0	0	0	1	0	0	0	1	0
20	DF	(England) ENG	Shaun Cooper	11	0	7+2	0	0	0	0	0	1+1	0
28	MF	(France) FRA	Toumani Diagouraga	8	0	8	0	0	0	0	0	0	0
32	FW	(England) ENG	John Marquis	6	2	4+1	1	0	0	0	0	1	1
33	DF	(England) ENG	Daniel Potts	5	0	5	0	0	0	0	0	0	0
33	MF	(Scotland) SCO	Rhys McCabe	4	0	2+2	0	0	0	0	0	0	0

=== Top scorers ===
Place	Position	Nation	Number	Name	League Two	FA Cup	League Cup	FL Trophy	Total
1	MF	(England)	35	Jed Wallace	7	0	0	0	7
2	MF	(England)	29	Danny Hollands	6	0	0	0	6
3	FW	(England)	20	Ryan Taylor	5	0	0	0	5
3	FW	(Republic of Ireland)	9	David Connolly	4	1	0	0	5
3	FW	(Ghana)	23	Patrick Agyemang	4	0	0	1	5
4	FW	(England)	32	Jake Jervis	4	0	0	0	4
5	DF	(England)	3	Bondz N'Gala	3	0	0	0	3
5	MF	(England)	7	Andy Barcham	3	0	0	0	3
5	FW	(England)	18	Ryan Bird	3	0	0	0	3
5	FW	(Republic of Ireland)	28	Michael Drennan	3	0	0	0	3
6	DF	(England)	6	Sonny Bradley	2	0	0	0	2
6	MF	(England)	11	Ricky Holmes	2	0	0	0	2
6	MF	(England)	19	Wes Fogden	2	0	0	0	2
6	DF	(England)	22	Adam Webster	2	0	0	0	2
6	FW	(England)	32	John Marquis	1	0	0	1	2
7	DF	(England)	4	Danny East	1	0	0	0	1
7	MF	(France)	8	Romain Padovani	1	0	0	0	1
7	FW	(England)	10	Tom Craddock	1	0	0	0	1
7	MF	(Austria)	13	Johnny Ertl	1	0	0	0	1
7	MF	(Scotland)	16	Simon Ferry	1	0	0	0	1
				TOTALS	56	1	0	2	59

=== Disciplinary record ===
Number	Nation	Position	Name	League Two		FA Cup		League Cup		FL Trophy		Total	
Number	Nation	Position	Name	Yellow card	Red card	Yellow card	Red card	Yellow card	Red card	Yellow card	Red card	Yellow card	Red card
35	(England)	MF	Jed Wallace	6	0	1	0	1	0	1	0	9	0
3	(England)	DF	Bondz N'Gala	8	0	0	0	0	0	0	0	8	0
6	(England)	DF	Sonny Bradley	7^{1}	0	0	0	0	0	1	0	8	0
14	(Republic of Ireland)	DF	Marcos Painter	5	0	0	0	0	0	0	0	5	0
32	(England)	FW	John Marquis	3	0	0	0	0	0	1	0	4	0
20	(England)	DF	Shaun Cooper	3	0	0	0	0	0	0	0	3	0
31	(Guadeloupe)	MF	Therry Racon	3	0	0	0	0	0	0	0	3	0
40	(Northern Ireland)	GK	Trevor Carson	3	0	0	0	0	0	0	0	3	0
4	(England)	DF	Danny East	2	0	0	0	1	0	0	0	3	0
11	(England)	MF	Ricky Holmes	2	0	0	0	1	0	0	0	3	0
8	(France)	MF	Romain Padovani	2	0	0	0	0	0	1	0	3	0
13	(Austria)	MF	Johnny Ertl	2	1	0	0	0	0	0	0	2	1
15	(Wales)	DF	Daniel Alfei	2	0	0	0	0	0	0	0	2	0
19	(England)	MF	Wes Fogden	2	0	0	0	0	0	0	0	2	0
36	(England)	DF	Jack Whatmough	2	0	0	0	0	0	0	0	2	0
2	(France)	DF	Yassin Moutaouakil	0	1	1	0	0	0	0	0	1	1
9	(Republic of Ireland)	FW	David Connolly	0	1	0	0	0	0	0	0	0	1
26	(England)	DF	Ben Chorley	0	1	0	0	0	0	0	0	0	1
15	(England)	MF	Gavin Mahon	0	0	0	1	0	0	0	0	0	1
5	(England)	DF	Joe Devera	1	0	0	0	0	0	0	0	1	0
7	(England)	MF	Andy Barcham	1	0	0	0	0	0	0	0	1	0
10	(England)	FW	Tom Craddock	1	0	0	0	0	0	0	0	1	0
16	(Scotland)	MF	Simon Ferry	1	0	0	0	0	0	0	0	1	0
17	(England)	DF	Nicky Shorey	1	0	0	0	0	0	0	0	1	0
18	(England)	FW	Ryan Bird	1	0	0	0	0	0	0	0	1	0
20	(England)	FW	Ryan Taylor	1	0	0	0	0	0	0	0	1	0
29	(England)	MF	Danny Hollands	1	0	0	0	0	0	0	0	1	0
29	(France)	MF	Toumani Diagouraga	1	0	0	0	0	0	0	0	1	0
32	(England)	FW	Jake Jervis	1	0	0	0	0	0	0	0	1	0
33	(Scotland)	MF	Rhys McCabe	1	0	0	0	0	0	0	0	1	0
33	(England)	DF	Daniel Potts	1	0	0	0	0	0	0	0	1	0
34	(England)	DF	Dan Butler	0	0	0	0	1	0	0	0	1	0
			TOTALS	64	4	2	1	4	0	4	0	74	5

- ^{1} Adding one yellow card received during the cancelled match against Wycombe.

=== Injuries ===
Date	Pos.	Name	Injury	Note	Recovery time	Source
6 September 2013	FW	Tom Craddock	Knee injury	During training	3 weeks	Sky Sports
26 November 2013	FW	Tom Craddock	Knee injury	During training	Undisclosed	Portsmouth News
4 December 2013	DF	Dan Butler	Knee injury	During match	3 months	Portsmouth News
4 December 2013	DF	Danny East	Neck/Ankle injury	During match	4 months	Chichester Observer
18 January 2014	MF	Simon Ferry	Back injury	During match	2 months	Portsmouth News
22 February 2014	MF	Andy Barcham	Thigh injury	During match	Undisclosed	Portsmouth News
18 March 2014	MF	Romain Padovani	Calf	During training	2 months	Portsmouth News
20 March 2014	FW	Ryan Bird	Groin injury	During match	Undisclosed	Portsmouth News
20 March 2014	FW	Ryan Taylor	Groin injury	During training	2 weeks	ESPN
29 March 2014	DF	Jack Whatmough	Hip/Lower back injury	During match	7 days	Portsmouth News
2 April 2014	FW	Patrick Agyemang	Ankle injury	During training	9 days	Portsmouth News
5 April 2014	MF	Wes Fogden	Knee injury	During match	12 days	Portsmouth FC
5 April 2014	DF	Adam Webster	Injury	During match	12 days	Webster's Twitter
12 April 2014	MF	Simon Ferry	Back problem	During match	Undisclosed	Portsmouth News

== Competition ==
=== Pre-season ===
9 July 2013	Havant & Waterlooville	0–5	Portsmouth	Havant
20:00 BST		Report	Bird 1', 41'; Woodford 69' (o.g.); Padovani 86'; Barcham 87'	Stadium: Westleigh Park; Attendance: 3,009; Referee: Dean Treleaven

10 July 2013	Aldershot Town Trialists	0–2	Portsmouth Trialists	Aldershot
BST		Report	Leader; 85' Phillip	Stadium: Recreation Ground; Attendance: 0 (Behind closed doors)

13 July 2013	Bognor Regis Town	2–4	Portsmouth	Bognor Regis
14:00 BST	Dodd 75'; Whyte 89'	Report	35' Connolly; 62' Padovani; 64' Holmes; 76' Craddock	Stadium: Nyewood Lane; Referee: Ashley Slaughter

16 July 2013	Braintree Town	0–0	Portsmouth	Braintree
19:45 BST		Report		Stadium: Amlin Stadium; Referee: Mike Bull

20 July 2013	Portsmouth	0–3	Charlton Athletic	Portsmouth
15:00 BST	Wallace (yellow card) 48'	Report	34' Pritchard; 67' Harriott; 76' (pen.) Kermorgant	Stadium: Fratton Park; Attendance: 8,557; Referee: Keith Stroud

23 July 2013	Bournemouth	2–1	Portsmouth	Bournemouth
19:45 BST	Coulibaly 34'; Cornick 80'	Report	Barcham 63'	Stadium: Dean Court; Attendance: 1,806 (312 Pompey fans); Referee: Andy Davies

24 July 2013	Salisbury City	3–1	Portsmouth XI	Salisbury
19:45 BST	6' (o.g.); Feeney 45'; Fitchett	Report	82' Harris	Stadium: Raymond McEnhill Stadium; Attendance: 440; Referee: Brendan Malone

28 July 2013	Portsmouth	0–2	Rayo Vallecano	Portsmouth
15:00 BST		Report	17' Saballs; 43' Adrián; (yellow card) Mario	Stadium: Fratton Park; Attendance: 4,945; Referee: David Phillips

30 July 2013	Gosport	4–1	Portsmouth XI	Gosport
19:45 BST	Gosney 19'; Pearce 30', 65'; Barton	ReportReport	55' Harris	Stadium: Privett Park; Attendance: 533

=== Football League Trophy ===
3 September 2013 Southern 1st Rd	Torquay United	0–0 (3–5 p)	Portsmouth	Plainmoor, Torquay
19:45 BST		Report		Attendance: 1,951; Referee: Keith Hill
	Penalties
	Hawley (penalty scored); Ball (penalty scored); Mansell (penalty missed); Tonge (penalty scored)		(penalty scored) Bradley; (penalty scored) Wallace; (penalty scored) Holmes; (penalty scored) Craddock; (penalty scored) Moutaouakil

8 October 2013 Southern 2nd Rd	Oxford United	1–2	Portsmouth	Kassam Stadium, Oxford
19:45 BST	Raynes (yellow card) 50'; Smalley (yellow card) 53'; O'Dowda (yellow card) 75'; Constable 90'	Report	(yellow card) 45+2' (goal) 83' Marquis; (yellow card) 60' Wallace; 66' Agyemang	Attendance: 3,697; Referee: Ian Williamson

12 November 2013 Southern Qtr Final	Newport County	3–0	Portsmouth	Rodney Parade, Newport
19:45 GMT	Washington 5', 83'; Oshilaja 19'; Flynn (yellow card) 45+1'; Pipe (red card) 68'; Crow (yellow card) 76'; Jackson (yellow card) 90'	Report	(yellow card) 17' Padovani; (yellow card) 75' Bradley	Attendance: 2,849; Referee: Graham Scott

=== Football League Cup ===
6 August 2013 First Round	Bournemouth	1–0	Portsmouth	Bournemouth
19:45 BST	Elphick (yellow card) 45+2'; O'Kane 54'; Hughes (yellow card) 78'	Report	(yellow card) 25' East; (yellow card) 26' Holmes; (yellow card) 37' Butler; (yellow card) 55' Wallace	Stadium: Dean Court; Attendance: 7,620; Referee: Graham

=== FA Cup ===
9 November 2013 First Round	Stevenage	2–1	Portsmouth	Bournemouth
15:00 GMT	Zoko 9', 39'; Tansey (yellow card) 90+1'	Report	(yellow card) 39' Moutaouakil; (red card) 48' Mahon; 71' Connolly; (yellow card) 90' Wallace	Stadium: Dean Court; Attendance: 7,620; Referee: Graham

=== League Two ===
Pos	Team	Pld	W	D	L	GF	GA	GD	Pts
11	Mansfield Town	46	15	15	16	49	58	−9	60
12	Bury	46	13	20	13	59	51	+8	59
13	Portsmouth	46	14	17	15	56	66	−10	59
14	Newport County	46	14	16	16	56	59	−3	58
15	Accrington Stanley	46	14	15	17	54	56	−2	57

Updated to match(es) played on 3 May 2014. Source: BBC Sport
Rules for classification: 1) Points; 2) Goal difference; 3) Number of goals scored

==== Results summary ====
Overall								Home						Away					
Pld	W	D	L	GF	GA	GD	Pts	W	D	L	GF	GA	GD	W	D	L	GF	GA	GD
46	14	17	15	56	66	−10	59	9	6	8	26	25	+1	5	11	7	30	41	−11

Last updated: 3 May 2014.
Source: BBC

==== Results by round ====
Round	1	2	3	4	5	6	7	8	9	10	11	12	13	14	15	16	17	18	19	20	21	22	23	24	25	26	27	28	29	30	31	32	33	34	35	36	37	38	39	40	41	42	43	44	45	46
Ground	H	A	H	A	H	A	A	H	A	H	A	H	H	A	A	H	A	H	H	A	H	A	H	H	A	H	A	H	A	A	H	A	H	A	A	H	H	A	H	A	A	H	A	H	A	A
Result	L	D	W	D	L	D	W	L	L	W	D	W	D	D	W	L	L	L	D	L	L	W	D	L	W	D	D	D	W	L	D	W	L	D	D	D	L	L	L	W	W	W	W	W	D	D
Position	23	21	10	11	18	17	13	15	17	15	15	15	16	16	16	16	18	18	17	18	20	17	17	19	19	20	21	21	18	18	19	17	21	15	16	17	19	22	22	21	19	16	14	13	11	13

Updated to match(es) played on 3 May 2014. Source: Soccerway
A = Away; H = Home; W = Win; D = Draw; L = Loss

==== Matches ====
3 August 2013 1	Portsmouth	1–4	Oxford United	Portsmouth
15:00 BST	Agyemang 25'; Ertl (red card) 58'; Bradley (yellow card) 68'	Report	33', 72' Smalley; 37', 64' Potter; (yellow card) 73' Kitson	Stadium: Fratton Park; Attendance: 18,181; Referee: Ward
Note: Record attendance in League Two.

10 August 2013 2	Accrington Stanley	2–2	Portsmouth	Accrington
15:00 BST	Murphy 47', 84'; Hunt (yellow card) 62'	Report	(yellow card) 26' East; 57', 78' (pen.) Connolly	Stadium: Crown Ground; Attendance: 2,531; Referee: Ilderton

17 August 2013 3	Portsmouth	3–0	Morecambe	Portsmouth
15:00 BST	Wallace 20'; Connolly 26'; Agyemang 39'; Bradley (yellow card) 84'	Report	(yellow card) 10' (red card) 36' Wright; (yellow card) 15' Parrish; (yellow card) 88' Kenyon	Stadium: Fratton Park; Attendance: 14,590; Referee: Drysdale

24 August 2013 4	Mansfield Town	2–2	Portsmouth	Mansfield
15:00 BST	Hutchinson 33'; Meikle 72'	Report	39' Barcham; 44' Connolly	Stadium: Field Mill; Attendance: 4,574; Referee: Stephen Martin

31 August 2013 5	Portsmouth	0–2	Chesterfield	Portsmouth
15:00 BST	Connolly (red card) 38'	Report	(yellow card) 55' O'Shea; 87' Gnanduillet; 90+2' Darikwa	Stadium: Fratton Park; Attendance: 15,999; Referee: Bratt

7 September 2013 6	Cheltenham Town	2–2	Portsmouth	Cheltenham
15:00 BST	McGlashan 36', 90+2'	Report	5' Agyemang; 44' Ertl; (yellow card) 90+5'	Stadium: Whaddon Road; Attendance: 4,776; Referee: Malone

14 September 2013 7	Burton Albion	1–2	Portsmouth	Burton-on-Trent
15:00 BST	Holness (yellow card) 53'; Bell (yellow card) 55'; Diamond 90+6'	Report	34' Holmes; 52' Ferry; (yellow card) 67' Bradley; (red card) 84' Moutaouakil	Stadium: Pirelli Stadium; Attendance: 3,577; Referee: Whitestone

21 September 2013 8	Portsmouth	0–1	Fleetwood Town	Portsmouth
15:00 BST	N'Gala (yellow card) 52'; Holmes (yellow card) 63'	Report	(yellow card) 23' Cresswell; (yellow card) 48' Matt; 67' (o.g.) Bradley	Stadium: Fratton Park; Attendance: 15,809; Referee: Horwood

28 September 2013 9	York City	4–2	Portsmouth	York
15:00 BST	Fletcher 4', 66'; Montrose (yellow card) 26' (goal) 58'; Oyebanjo (yellow card) 51'; Jarvis 64'; (yellow card) 89' Whitehouse	Report	(yellow card) 51' (goal) 53' Wallace; (yellow card) 59' Painter; (yellow card) 82' N'Gala; 88' Marquis	Stadium: Bootham Crescent; Attendance: 4,848; Referee: Mark Heywood

5 October 2013 10	Portsmouth	3–0	Rochdale	Portsmouth
15:00 BST	Wallace (yellow card) 16' (goal) 24'; Bradley (yellow card) 45+2'; N'Gala 52', 66'; Ertl (yellow card) 56'; Painter (yellow card) 78'	Report	(yellow card) 51' Bennett	Stadium: Fratton Park; Attendance: 15,155; Referee: Simon Hooper

12 October 2013 11	Plymouth Argyle	1–1	Portsmouth	Plymouth
15:00 BST	Hourihane 21'	Report	39' Wallace; (yellow card) 61' Marquis	Stadium: Home Park; Attendance: 8,742; Referee: Steve Martin

19 October 2013 12	Portsmouth	1–0	Bury	Portsmouth
15:00 BST	N'Gala 4' (yellow card) 29'; Holmes (yellow card) 45+3'; Marquis (yellow card) 66'; Racon (yellow card) 73'	Report	(yellow card) 74' Procter	Stadium: Fratton Park; Attendance: 15,434; Referee: Carl Berry

22 October 2013 13	Portsmouth	A–A	Wycombe Wanderers	Portsmouth
19:45 BST	Bradley (yellow card) 10'; Agyemang 45'	Report	30' Knott; (yellow card) 15' Scowen	Stadium: Fratton Park; Attendance: 14,285; Referee: Lee Collins
Note: Match abandoned at half time due to a waterlogged pitch. Score was 1–1

26 October 2013 14	Torquay United	1–1	Portsmouth	Torquay
15:00 BST	Chapell 1'	Report	(yellow card) 25' Marquis; (yellow card) 78' Cooper; 81' Bird	Stadium: Plainmoor; Attendance: 3,843; Referee: Andy Woolmer

2 November 2013 15	Portsmouth	3–2	Exeter City	Portsmouth
15:00 GMT	Holmes 45'; Bird 49' 71'; Barcham (yellow card) 89'	Report	75' Coles; 84' O'Flynn; (yellow card) 89' Gill	Stadium: Fratton Park; Attendance: 16,168; Referee: Oliver Langford

16 November 2013 16	Wimbledon	4–0	Portsmouth	Kingston upon Thames
15:00 GMT	Pell (yellow card) 25'; Frampton 34', 74'; Fuller (yellow card) 37'; Moore 82'; Smith 90+1'	Report	(yellow card) 22' Carson; (yellow card) 66' Ferry; (yellow card) 86' Bradley	Stadium: Kingsmeadow; Attendance: 4,605; Referee: Robert Lewis

23 November 2013 17	Portsmouth	1–2	Scunthorpe United	Portsmouth
15:00 GMT	Craddock 36'; N'Gala (yellow card) 82'; Wallace (yellow card) 84'	Report	40', 70' Syers; (yellow card) 87' Dawson	Stadium: Fratton Park; Attendance: 14,550; Referee: Trevor Kettle

26 November 2013 18	Portsmouth	1–2	Southend United	Portsmouth
19:45 GMT	Barcham 2'; Whatmough (yellow card) 70'; Craddock (yellow card) 76'	Report	(yellow card) 15' Prosser; (red card) 66' Woodrow; 76' Atkinson; 82' Corr	Stadium: Fratton Park; Attendance: 13,427; Referee: Keith Hill

30 November 2013 19	Hartlepool United	0–0	Portsmouth	Hartlepool
15:00 GMT	Dolan (yellow card) 90+2'	Report	(yellow card) 88' Bird	Stadium: Victoria Park; Attendance: 4,126; Referee: Paul Tierney

4 December 2013 13	Portsmouth	2–2	Wycombe Wanderers	Portsmouth
19:45 BST	Wallace (yellow card) 44'; Cooper (yellow card) 51'; Connolly (penalty missed) 71'; Barcham 73'; Agyemang 84'	Report	(yellow card) 4' Johnson; (yellow card) 11' Spring; 23' McClure; (yellow card) 45+1' Knott; (yellow card) 70' Ingram; 90+5' Stewart	Stadium: Fratton Park; Attendance: 14,942; Referee: Darren Drysdale
Note: Rearranged match.

14 December 2013 20	Portsmouth	0–2	Newport Country	Portsmouth
15:00 GMT	Potts (yellow card) 4'; Cooper (yellow card) 78'	Report	(yellow card) 44' Oshilaja; (yellow card) 45+1' Pidgeley; (yellow card) 58' (goal) 65' Chapman; 68' Flynn; (yellow card) 72' Worley	Stadium: Fratton Park; Attendance: 15,295; Referee: Darren Deadman

21 December 2013 21	Bristol Rovers	2–0	Portsmouth	Bristol
15:00 GMT	Clarke 40'; Clarkson 77'	Report	(yellow card) 75' N'Gala	Stadium: Memorial Stadium; Attendance: 7,537; Referee: Steven Rushton

26 December 2013 22	Portsmouth	1–0	Dagenham & Redbridge	Portsmouth
15:00 GMT	Padovani 45'br>Racon (yellow card) 78'; Carson (yellow card) 81'	Report	(yellow card) 88' D'Ath; (yellow card) 90+4' Doe	Stadium: Fratton Park; Attendance: 15,192; Referee: Graham Salisbury

29 December 2013 23	Portsmouth	0–0	Northampton Town	Portsmouth
15:00 GMT		Report		Stadium: Fratton Park; Attendance: 15,426; Referee: Gavin Ward

1 January 2014 24	Southend United	2–1	Portsmouth	Southend
15:00 GMT	Leonard 45', 90+2'	Report	30' Bradley	Stadium: Roots Hall; Attendance: 7,736; Referee: David Phillips

4 January 2014 25	Portsmouth	P–P	Accrington Stanley	Portsmouth
15:00 BST		Report		Stadium: Fratton Park
Note: Match postponed due to a waterlogged pitch.

11 January 2014 26	Oxford United	0–0	Portsmouth	Oxford
15:00 GMT	Williams (yellow card) 53'; Raynes (yellow card) 86'	Report	(yellow card) 52' Devera; (yellow card) 59' Wallace; (yellow card) 64' Racon; (yellow card) 85' Alfei; (yellow card) 86' Bradley	Stadium: Kassam Stadium; Attendance: 8,443; Referee: Mark Heywood

18 January 2014 27	Portsmouth	1–1	Mansfield Town	Portsmouth
15:00 BST	Taylor 78'	Report	(yellow card) 28' Tafazolli; 51' Stevenson; (yellow card) 56' Howell	Stadium: Fratton Park; Attendance: 14,686; Referee: Darren Sheldrake

25 January 2014 28	Morecambe	2–2	Portsmouth	Morecambe
15:00 GMT	Hughes 21'; Fleming (yellow card) 44'; Redshaw 76'	Report	10' 43' Jervis	Stadium: Globe Arena; Attendance: 2,550; Referee: Andy Haines

28 January 2014 29	Wycombe Wanderers	0–1	Portsmouth	High Wycombe
19:45 GMT	Scowen (yellow card) 67'; McClure (yellow card) 90+4'	Report	50' (pen.) Taylor; (yellow card) 78' Painter; (yellow card) 90+2' Ertl	Stadium: Adams Park; Attendance: 3,733; Referee: Charles Breakspear

1 February 2014 30	Portsmouth	0–1	Torquay United	Portsmouth
15:00 BST		Report	27' Bodin	Stadium: Fratton Park; Attendance: 15,474; Referee: Dean Whitestone

8 February 2014 31	Exeter City	1–1	Portsmouth	Exeter
15:00 GMT	Sercombe 90+4'	Report	9' Jervis; (yellow card) 70' Painter	Stadium: St James Park; Attendance: 5,221; Referee: Gary Sutton

15 February 2014 32	Portsmouth	1–0	Wimbledon	Portsmouth
15:00 BST	Taylor 52'; Painter (yellow card) 90+1'	Report		Stadium: Fratton Park; Attendance: 15,742; Referee: Stuart Attwell

22 February 2014 33	Scunthorpe United	5–1	Portsmouth	Scunthorpe
15:00 GMT	Syers 6' 43' 55'; Winnall 36'; Madden 48'	Report	86' Drennan	Stadium: Glanford Park; Attendance: 4,165; Referee: Lee Collins

25 February 2014 25	Portsmouth	1–0	Accrington Stanley	Portsmouth
19:45 GMT	Padovani (yellow card) 30'; Jervis (yellow card) 45+1' (goal) 48'	Report	(yellow card) 69' Joyce	Stadium: Fratton Park; Attendance: 13,387; Referee: Chris Sarginson

3 March 2014 34	Chesterfield	0–0	Portsmouth	Chesterfield
19:45 GMT	Morsy (yellow card) 70'; Darikwa (yellow card) 87'	Report		Stadium: Proact Stadium; Attendance: 5,807; Referee: Mark Brown

8 March 2014 35	Portsmouth	0–0	Cheltenham Town	Portsmouth
15:00 GMT	Fogden (yellow card) 77'; Diagouraga (yellow card) 82'	Report		Stadium: Fratton Park; Attendance: 17,254; Referee: Michael Bull

11 March 2014 36	Portsmouth	0–0	Burton Albion	Portsmouth
19:45 GMT	N'Gala (yellow card) 63'; Padovani (yellow card) 63'; Wallace (yellow card) 88'	Report	(yellow card) 79' MacDonald	Stadium: Fratton Park; Attendance: 12,780; Referee: Carl Berry

15 March 2014 37	Fleetwood Town	3–1	Portsmouth	Fleetwood
15:00 GMT	Parkin 16'; Sarcevic 26' (pen.); Schumacher (yellow card) 29'; McLaughlin (yellow card) 53'; Matt 56'	Report	64' Wallace; (yellow card) 90+3' N'Gala	Stadium: Highbury Stadium; Attendance: 3,509; Referee: Iain Williamson

22 March 2014 38	Portsmouth	0–1	York City	Portsmouth
15:00 GMT	Chorley (red card) 50'; Alfei (yellow card) 81'	Report	5' Coulson; (yellow card) 45+1' Penn; (yellow card) 72' Reed; (yellow card) 901' Oyebanjo	Stadium: Fratton Park; Attendance: 14,814; Referee: Roger East

25 March 2014 39	Rochdale	3–0	Portsmouth	Rochdale
19:45 GMT	Lund 16'; Henderson 59'; Vicenti 63'	Report		Stadium: Spotland; Attendance: 2,746; Referee: Nigel Miller

29 March 2014 40	Newport County	1–2	Portsmouth	Newport
15:00 GMT	Chapman (red card) 27'; Zebroski (yellow card) 41'; Blake (yellow card) 45+2' (red card) 83'; Yakubu 74'	Report	22' (pen.) (yellow card) 27' Taylor; 40' Wallace; (yellow card) 75' Hollands; (yellow card) (0' Fogden	Stadium: Rodney Parade; Attendance: 4,261; Referee: Steve Bratt

5 April 2014 41	Portsmouth	1–0	Hartlepool United	Portsmouth
15:00 GMT	Webster 2'	Report		Stadium: Fratton Park; Attendance: 15,273; Referee: Andy D'Urso

12 April 2014 42	Dagenham & Redbridge	1–4	Portsmouth	Dagenham
15:00 GMT	Ogogo 34'; D'Ath (yellow card) 77'	Report	4' Hollands; 21' 57' Drennan; 87' Wallace	Stadium: Victoria Road; Attendance: 3,115; Referee: Steve Martin

19 April 2014 43	Portsmouth	3–2	Bristol Rovers	Portsmouth
15:00 GMT	Webster 12'; Hollands 41'; McCabe (yellow card) 42'; Whatmough (yellow card) 59'; Fogden 70'; N'Gala (yellow card) 88'	Report	(yellow card) 8' Woodards; 22' 41' Harrold; (yellow card) 45+4' Brown; (yellow card) 52' Parkes	Stadium: Fratton Park; Attendance: 17,998; Referee: James Adcock

21 April 2014 44	Northampton Town	0–1	Portsmouth	Northampton
15:00 GMT	Tony (yellow card) 56'; Horwood (yellow card) 72'; Robertson (yellow card) 87'	Report	6' East; (yellow card) 72' Carson; (yellow card) 90+3' Shorey	Stadium: Sixfields Stadium; Attendance: 6,829; Referee: Darren Deadman

26 April 2014 45	Bury	4–4	Portsmouth	Bury
15:00 GMT	Hope 10' 34' 87'; Procter 49'	Report	53' Hollands; 82' Taylor; 88' Bradley; 90+3' Fogden	Stadium: Gigg Lane; Attendance: 4,759; Referee: Steven Rushton

3 May 2014 46	Portsmouth	3–3	Plymouth Argyle	Portsmouth
15:00 GMT	Hollands 32' 38' 47'	Report	(yellow card) 22' Trotman; 35' Reid; (yellow card) 36' Berry; 41' 89' Hourihane	Stadium: Fratton Park; Attendance: 18,026; Referee: Stuart Attwell
