= 2007–08 Charlton Athletic F.C. season =

Charlton Athletic
2007–08 season
- Chairman: Richard Murray
- Manager: Alan Pardew
- Championship: 11th
- FA Cup: Third round
- League Cup: Third round
- Top goalscorer: League: Chris Iwelumo (10); All: Chris Iwelumo (10)
- Highest home attendance: 26,202; Away: 19,021
- Lowest home attendance: 8,022 (pre-season friendly); Away: 4,534
Home colours	Away colours

During the 2007–08 English football season, Charlton Athletic participated in the Football League Championship, having been relegated from the Premier League the previous season. Along with competing in the Championship, the club also participated in the FA Cup, and the League Cup. The season covered the period from 1 July 2007 to 30 June 2008.

== Kit ==
Charlton's kits were produced by Spanish company Joma. The club retained the sponsorship of the Spanish property company, Llanera, who declared bankruptcy during the season.

== Season review ==
=== Pre-season ===
Pre-season was dominated by the transfer speculation involving England striker Darren Bent. A fee was agreed with West Ham United, but the player himself rejected the deal, instead choosing to join Tottenham Hotspur two weeks later for a club record sale of £17 million. A number of other key players, such as Jimmy Floyd Hasselbaink, Talal El Karkouri, Hermann Hreiðarsson Scott Carson and Alex Song, also left the club after relegation.

=== League review ===
After the first ten games of the season, Charlton were second in the league table, behind leaders Watford, having beaten Sheffield Wednesday, Crystal Palace, Norwich City, Leicester City and Hull City, drawn with Scunthorpe United, Colchester United, Coventry City and Barnsley and lost just once, to Stoke City. However, this form could not be maintained and by the end of the season, Charlton finished 11th, losing several matches, the worst being an embarrassing 3–0 loss to struggling Barnsley.

== Players ==
=== Squad information ===
N	Pos.	Nat.	Name	Age	EU	Since	App(GS/Sub)	Goals	Ends	Transfer fee	Notes
1	GK	(England)	Weaver	29	EU	2007	18 (18/0)	0	2010	Free	
30	GK	(Republic of Ireland)	Randolph	21	EU	2006	1 (1/0)	0	2009	Youth system	
31	GK	(Republic of Ireland)	Elliot (Note: Elliot was born in Greenwich, England, but also qualifies to represent the Republic of Ireland internationally through his father and represented them at under-19 level before making his international debut for the Republic of Ireland in May 2014.)	23	EU	2006	0 (0/0)	0		Youth system	
2	RB	(France)	Moutaouakil	21	EU	2007	6 (5/1)	0	2011	£400,000	
25	RB	(England)	Halford	23	EU	2008	0 (0/0)	0	2008	Loan	on loan from Sunderland
44	RB	(England)	Mills	31	EU	2007	0 (0/0)	0	2007	Loan	on loan from Manchester City
3	LB	(Wales)	Thatcher (Note: Thatcher was born in Swindon, England and represented them at U-21 level, but also qualified to represent Wales internationally through his grandmother and made his international debut for Wales in March 2004.)	32	EU	2007	14 (13/1)	0	2008	£500,000	
15	LB	(England)	Powell	38	EU	2007	10 (10/0)	0	2008	Free	
17	LB	(United States)	Gibbs	28	Non-EU	2006	0 (0/0)	0	2009	Free	
26	LB	(Central African Republic)	Youga	22	Non-EU	2005	0 (0/0)	0		Free	
34	LB	(Wales)	Basey (Note: Basey was born in Bromley, England, but also qualified to represent Wales internationally through his grandmother and represented them at U-17, U-19, and U-21 level.)	19	EU	2007	5 (5/0)	0	2008	Youth system	
4	CB	(Nigeria)	Sodje (Note: Sodje was born in Greenwich, England, but also qualified to represent Nigeria internationally through his parents and made his international debut for Nigeria in November 2005.)	29	Non-EU	2007	11 (5/6)	1	2008	Loan	On loan from Reading
6	CB	(Republic of Ireland)	McCarthy	25	EU	2007	7 (6/1)	1	2011	£650,000	
21	CB	(Algeria)	Bougherra (Note: Bougherra was born in Longvic, France, but also qualified to represent Algeria internationally through his grandfather and represented them at U-23 level before making his international debut for Algeria in June 2004.)	25	Non-EU	2007	18 (14/4)	0	2011	£2.5m	
22	CB	(England)	Sankofa	23	EU	2003	18 (14/4)	0	2008	Youth system	
24	CB	(England)	Fortune	27	EU	2001	164 (136/28)	8	2009	Youth system	
33	CB	(England)	A. Thomas	18	EU	2007	0 (0/0)	0		Youth system	
37	CB	(Portugal)	Monteiro	23	EU	2008	0 (0/0)	0			
5	MF	(China)	Zheng	27	Non-EU	2006	28 (23/5)	6	2009	£2m	
7	MF	(Republic of Ireland)	Reid (captain)	25	EU	2006	35 (33/2)	7	2010	£3m	
7	MF	(England)	Cook	26	EU	2008	0 (0/0)	0	2008	Loan	On loan from Fulham
8	MF	(Republic of Ireland)	Holland (Note: Holland was born in Bury, England, but qualified to represent the Republic of Ireland internationally through his grandmother and made his debut for Republic of Ireland in 1999.)	34	EU	2003	146 (132/14)	12	2008	£900,000	
11	MF	(England)	Ambrose	24	EU	2005	79 (54/25)	8	2009	Undisclosed	
19	MF	(England)	Sinclair	23	EU	2007	2 (1/1)	0	2009	£125,000	On loan at Cheltenham Town
20	MF	(France)	Racon (Note: Racon was born in Villeneuve-Saint-Georges, France, but also qualifies to represent Guadeloupe internationally and would make his international debut for Guadeloupe in June 2011.)	20	EU	2006	5 (3/2)	0		£400,000	
23	MF	(Portugal)	Semedo	22	EU	2007	18 (18/0)	0	2011	Free	
28	MF	(Republic of Ireland)	Arter (Note: Arter was born in Bexley, England, but qualified to represent the Republic of Ireland internationally through his grandparents and represented them at U-15, U-17, and U-19 level before making his debut for Republic of Ireland in June 2015.)	18	EU	2007	1 (0/1)	0	2009	Youth system	
32	MF	(England)	Wright	18	EU	2007	0 (0/0)	0	2009	Youth system	On loan at Barnet
39	MF	(England)	Shelvey	16	EU	2004	0 (0/0)	0		Youth system	
40	MF	(England)	Yussuff	18	EU	2006	0 (0/0)	0		Youth system	
––	MF	(Senegal)	Faye	31	Non-EU	2006	34 (29/5)	1	2009	£2m	On loan at Rangers
14	WI	(England)	J. Thomas	25	EU	2004	97 (69/28)	7	2009	£100,000	
18	WI	(England)	Sam (Note: Sam was born in Leeds, England, and represented them at U-20 level, but also qualified to represent Ghana internationally through his parents and would make his international debut for Ghana in October 2015.)	23	EU	2003	27 (17/10)	2	2010	Youth system	
25	WI	(Denmark)	Christensen	20	EU	2007	0 (0/0)	0		£350,000	
36	WI	(England)	Wagstaff	18	EU	2008	0 (0/0)	0	2011	Youth system	
9	CF	(England)	Bent	30	EU	2006	52 (38/14)	5	2009	£2.3m	On loan at Wigan Athletic
9	CF	(Scotland)	Gray (Note: Gray was born in Harrogate, England, but also qualified to represent Scotland internationally through his father and made his international debut for Scotland in April 2003.)	30	EU	2008	0 (0/0)	0	2011	£1.5m	
10	CF	(Bulgaria)	Todorov	30	EU	2007	9 (5/4)	3	2008	Free	
12	CF	(England)	Varney	25	EU	2007	14 (8/6)	3	2011	£2m	
16	CF	(Scotland)	Iwelumo	29	EU	2007	19 (15/4)	7	2010	Free	
22	CF	(England)	Sinclair	20	EU	2008	0 (0/0)	0	2008	Loan	on loan from Chelsea
27	CF	(England)	Walker (Note: Walker was born in Hackney, England, and represented them at U-18 level, but also qualified to represent Antigua and Barbuda internationally and would make his international debut for Antigua and Barbuda in September 2012.)	20	EU	2006	0 (0/0)	0		Youth system	On loan at Yeovil Town
29	CF	(England)	Dickson (Note: Dickson was born in Southwark, England, but also qualified to represent Ghana and Jamaica internationally through his father and mother respectively and would make his international debut for Ghana in August 2008.)	23	EU	2007	1 (0/1)	0	2009	£50,000	
35	CF	(England)	McLeod	23	EU	2007	13 (4/9)	0	2011	£1.1m	
38	CF	(England)	Lita (Note: Lita was born in Kinshasa, Zaire (now Democratic Republic of the Congo), but also qualified to represent England internationally and represented them at U-21 level.)	23	EU	2008	0 (0/0)	0	2008	Loan	on loan from Reading

- Last updated: 31 May 2008
- Source: cafc.co.uk, players' Wikipedia articles
- Ordered by position on pitch (from back right to front left).
- Player must own an EU passport or be a full, current, 'A' international to legally play in English football. (Source)
- Squad size is unlimited.

== Transfers ==
=== In ===
Date	Nat.	Name	Previous club	Fee	Ref.
21 May 2007	(England)	Luke Varney	(England) Crewe Alexandra	£2,000,000	
21 May 2007	(Scotland)	Chris Iwelumo	(England) Colchester United	Free	
6 June 2007	(Republic of Ireland)	Paddy McCarthy	(England) Leicester City	£650,000	
20 June 2007	(France)	Yassin Moutaouakil	(France) Châteauroux	£400,000	
25 June 2007	(Portugal)	José Semedo	(Portugal) Sporting CP	Free	
3 July 2007	(England)	Chris Powell	(England) Watford	Free	
4 July 2007	(England)	Nicky Weaver	(England) Manchester City	Free	
4 July 2007	(Bulgaria)	Svetoslav Todorov	(England) Portsmouth	Free	
27 July 2007	(England)	Dean Sinclair	(England) Barnet	£125,000	
9 August 2007	(England)	Izale McLeod	(England) MK Dons	£1,100,000	
9 August 2007	(China)	Zheng Zhi	(China) Shandong Luneng Taishan	£1,250,000	
11 August 2007	(France)	Therry Racon	(France) Guingamp	£372,394	
30 August 2007	(England)	Danny Mills	(England) Manchester City	Loan	
31 August 2007	(Nigeria)	Sam Sodje	(England) Reading	Loan	
25 January 2008	(Scotland)	Andy Gray	(England) Burnley	£1,500,000	

=== Out ===
Date	Nat.	Name	New club	Fee	Ref.
25 May 2007	(Iceland)	Hermann Hreiðarsson	(England) Portsmouth	Free	
19 June 2007	(Bulgaria)	Radostin Kishishev	(England) Leicester City	Free	
29 June 2007	(England)	Bryan Hughes	(England) Hull City	Free	
29 June 2007	(England)	Darren Bent	(England) Tottenham Hotspur	£16,500,000	
1 July 2007	(Netherlands)	Jimmy Floyd Hasselbaink	(Wales) Cardiff City	Released	
1 July 2007	(Morocco)	Talal El Karkouri	Qatar SC	Free	
1 July 2007	(Jamaica) (Note: Lisbie was born in Hackney, England, but also qualified to represent Jamaica internationally and made his international debut for Jamaica in 2002.)	Kevin Lisbie	(England) Colchester United	Released	
1 July 2007	(Norway)	Thomas Myhre	(Norway) Viking	Free	
1 July 2007	(England)	Nathan Ashton	(England) Fulham	Released	
1 July 2007	(England)	Alistair John	(England) Stevenage Borough	Released	
1 July 2007	(Iceland)	Rúrik Gíslason	-	Released	
4 July 2007	(England) (Note: Weston was born in Lewisham, England, and represented them at every youth level between U-16 and U-19, but also qualified to represent Antigua and Barbuda internationally and would make his international debut for Antigua and Barbuda in November 2014.)	Myles Weston	(England) Notts County	Free	
20 July 2007	(Denmark)	Dennis Rommedahl	(Netherlands) Ajax	£680,000	
26 July 2007	(England)	Luke Young	(England) Middlesbrough	£2,500,000	
27 July 2007	(England)	Simon Walton	(England) Queens Park Rangers	£200,000	
8 August 2007	(Senegal)	Souleymane Diawara	(France) Bordeaux	£2,600,000	

== Results ==
=== Pre-season friendlies ===
Win	Draw	Loss

Date	Opponent	Venue	Result (Note: Charlton Athletic's score shown first)	Scorers	Attendance	Ref.
11 July 2007	Welling United	Away	2–0	Varney, Dickson	3,500	
11 July 2007	Tooting & Mitcham	Away	5–0	Iwelumo (2), Bent, Reid, Walker		
24 July 2007	Marbella	Away	1–0	Dickson		
28 July 2007	Gillingham	Away	5–0	Ambrose (2), Todorov, J. Thomas, og		
1 August 2007	Aldershot Town	Away	0–0	—	1,500	
4 August 2007	Braga	Home	1–2	Ambrose	5,647	

=== Club Standings ===
Overall								Home						Away					
Pld	W	D	L	GF	GA	GD	Pts	W	D	L	GF	GA	GD	W	D	L	GF	GA	GD
46	17	13	16	63	58	+5	64	9	7	7	38	29	+9	8	6	9	25	29	−4

Last updated: 18 April 2024.

=== Round-by-Round Results ===
Round	1	2	3	4	5	6	7	8	9	10	11	12	13	14	15	16	17	18	19	20	21	22	23	24	25	26	27	28	29	30	31	32	33	34	35	36	37	38	39	40	41	42	43	44	45	46
Ground	H	A	H	A	A	H	H	A	A	H	A	H	H	A	A	H	A	H	H	A	H	A	H	A	A	H	H	A	H	A	H	A	H	A	A	H	H	A	A	H	H	A	H	A	A	H
Result	D	L	W	W	D	W	W	D	W	D	L	L	L	W	W	W	W	L	L	W	W	L	D	D	D	L	W	D	W	L	W	D	D	L	W	D	L	L	L	D	L	W	D	L	L	W
Position	13	16	12	7	5	3	2	2	2	2	3	6	8	4	4	2	2	3	4	3	3	5	5	5	5	5	5	6	5	5	5	5	5	6	5	5	5	5	9	8	11	8	9	11	12	11

Updated to match(es) played on 18 April 2024. Source:
A = Away; H = Home; W = Win; D = Draw; L = Loss

11 August 2007 1	Charlton Athletic	1–1	Scunthorpe United	The Valley

18 August 2007 2	Stoke City	2–1	Charlton Athletic	Britannia Stadium

25 August 2007 3	Charlton Athletic	3–2	Sheffield Wednesday	The Valley

1 September 2007 4	Crystal Palace	0–1	Charlton Athletic	Selhurst Park

15 September 2007 5	Colchester United	2–2	Charlton Athletic	Layer Road

18 September 2007 6	Charlton Athletic	2–0	Norwich City	The Valley

22 September 2007 7	Charlton Athletic	2–0	Leicester City	The Valley

29 September 2007 8	Coventry City	1–1	Charlton Athletic	Ricoh Arena

2 October 2007 9	Hull City	1–2	Charlton Athletic	KC Stadium

6 October 2007 10	Charlton Athletic	1–1	Barnsley	The Valley

20 October 2007 11	Wolverhampton Wanderers	2–0	Charlton Athletic	Molineux Stadium

23 October 2007 12	Charlton Athletic	1–2	Plymouth Argyle	The Valley

27 October 2007 13	Charlton Athletic	0–1	Queens Park Rangers	The Valley

3 November 2007 14	Southampton	0–1	Charlton Athletic	St Mary's Stadium

6 November 2007 15	Bristol City	0–1	Charlton Athletic	Ashton Gate

10 November 2007 16	Charlton Athletic	3–0	Cardiff City	The Valley

24 November 2007 17	Preston North End	0–2	Charlton Athletic	Deepdale

27 November 2007 18	Charlton Athletic	0–3	Sheffield United	The Valley

1 December 2007 19	Charlton Athletic	1–3	Burnley	The Valley

4 December 2007 20	Cardiff City	0–2	Charlton Athletic	Ninian Park

8 December 2007 21	Charlton Athletic	3–1	Ipswich Town	The Valley

15 December 2007 22	West Brom	4–2	Charlton Athletic	The Hawthorns

22 December 2007 23	Charlton Athletic	1–1	Hull City	The Valley

26 December 2007 24	Norwich City	1–1	Charlton Athletic	Carrow Road

29 December 2007 25	Leicester City	1–1	Charlton Athletic	Walkers Stadium

1 January 2008 26	Charlton Athletic	1–2	Colchester United	The Valley

12 January 2008 27	Charlton Athletic	4–1	Blackpool	The Valley

19 January 2008 28	Watford	1–1	Charlton Athletic	Vicarage Road

29 January 2008 29	Charlton Athletic	1–0	Stoke City	The Valley

2 February 2008 30	Scunthorpe United	1–0	Charlton Athletic	Glanford Park

8 February 2008 31	Charlton Athletic	2–0	Crystal Palace	The Valley

12 February 2008 32	Sheffield Wednesday	0–0	Charlton Athletic	Hillsborough

16 February 2008 33	Charlton Athletic	2–2	Watford	The Valley

23 February 2008 34	Blackpool	5–3	Charlton Athletic	Bloomfield Road

1 March 2008 35	Sheffield United	0–2	Charlton Athletic	Bramall Lane

4 March 2008 36	Charlton Athletic	1–1	Bristol City	The Valley

8 March 2008 37	Charlton Athletic	1–2	Preston North End	The Valley

11 March 2008 38	Burnley	1–0	Charlton Athletic	Turf Moor

15 March 2008 39	Ipswich Town	2–0	Charlton Athletic	Portman Road

21 March 2008 40	Charlton Athletic	1–1	West Brom	The Valley

29 March 2008 41	Charlton Athletic	2–3	Wolverhampton Wanderers	The Valley

5 April 2008 42	Plymouth Argyle	1–2	Charlton Athletic	Home Park

12 April 2008 43	Charlton Athletic	1–1	Southampton	The Valley

19 April 2008 44	Queens Park Rangers	1–0	Charlton Athletic	Loftus Road

26 April 2008 45	Barnsley	3–0	Charlton Athletic	Oakwell

4 May 2008 46	Charlton Athletic	4–1	Coventry City	The Valley

=== FA Cup ===
5 January 2008 Third round	Charlton Athletic	1–1	West Brom	The Valley

15 January 2008 Third round replay	West Brom	2–2 (a.e.t.) (4–3 p)	Charlton Athletic	The Hawthorns

=== League Cup ===
Win	Draw	Loss

Round	Date	Opponent	Venue	Result	Scorers	Attendance	Ref.
1	14 August 2007	Swindon Town	Away	2–0	Ambrose 52', Reid 63' (pen.)	6,175	
2	28 August 2007	Stockport County	Home	4–3	Todorov 35', Zheng 42' (pen.), Sam 74', McCarthy 90'	8,022	
3	25 September 2007	Luton Town	Away	1–3 (a.e.t.)	Sinclair 4'	4,534	
