= Romain Padovani =

French footballer (born 1989)

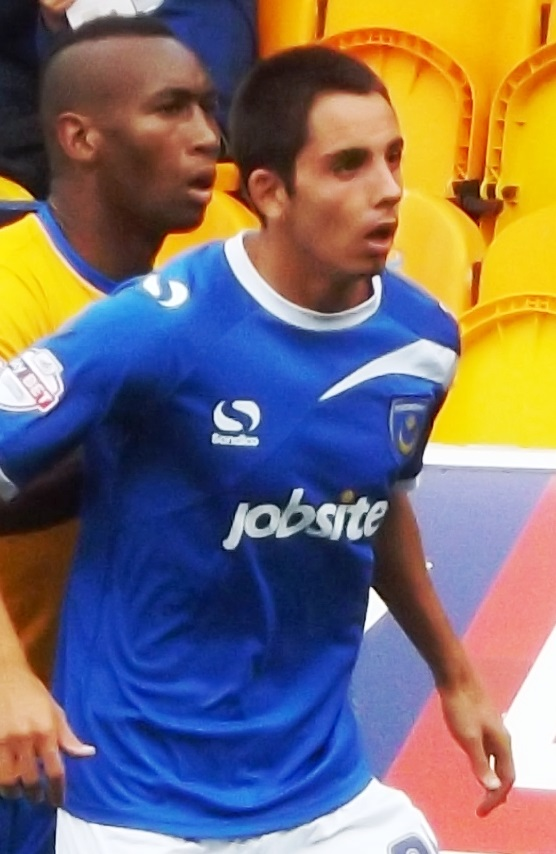
- Padovani playing for Portsmouth in 2013

Personal information
- Date of birth: 15 October 1989 (age 37)
- Place of birth: Nice, France
- Height: 1.87 m (6 ft 2 in)
- Position: Defensive midfielder

Youth career
- Villefranche
- 2001–2002: Monaco
- 2002–2008: Cavigal Nice Sports

Senior career*
Years	Team	Apps	(Gls)
2008	Rapid Menton	0	(0)
2008–2013	Monaco II	83	(14)
2013–2014	Portsmouth	18	(1)
2014–2015	Fréjus	33	(2)
2015–2016	Les Herbiers	30	(3)
2016–2020	Chambly	94	(10)
2020–2022	Quevilly-Rouen	64	(5)
- * Club domestic league appearances and goals as of 14 May 2022

Romain Padovani (born 15 October 1989) is a French professional footballer who plays as a defensive midfielder.

== Career ==
=== Monaco and trials ===
Born in Nice, Padovani began his career on FC Villefranche's youth system, and joined Monaco in 2001. He then left the club in the following season, finishing his formation with Cavigal Nice Sports. In 2008, he returned to Monaco, after a brief period with Rapid Menton (only playing friendlies). He was assigned with the club's B-side, in CFA. On 6 January 2009, he appeared on the bench in a first-team friendly against Juventus. In June 2010, Padovani signed a one-year professional deal with Monaco, which was renewed a year later.

He was released at the end of 2011–12 season, without featuring with the first team. However, after failed trials with Nantes, Laval and CA Bastia, he returned to Monaco II with an amateur contract. He then was a regular starter at the reserve side for 2012–13. In April 2013, Padovani went on a trial at Leyton Orient. He trained with the club for a week, but nothing came of it.

=== Portsmouth ===
Late in the month, Padovani went on a trial at Portsmouth, after Sebastien Ewen (Yassin Moutaouakil's agent) indicated the player to Pompey. On 9 May, he signed a two-year deal with the club, with Niort also providing competition for his signature.

Padovani made his Portsmouth debut on 9 July 2013, in a pre-season friendly against Havant & Waterlooville; he also scored the fourth of a 5–0 win. In his following game, against Bognor Regis Town, he scored the second of 4–2 win.

Padovani made his league debut in a 4–1 home defeat to Oxford United on 3 August 2013. He scored his first goal in English football on 26 December, scoring the only goal in a 1–0 home win over Dagenham & Redbridge, through a 45th-minute header. On 23 June of the following year, Padovani was released from Pompey by mutual consent.

=== Championnat National spells ===
A day after being released by Portsmouth, Padovani joined Fréjus Saint-Raphaël in a two-year deal. After just one season he moved on the Les Herbiers and then the following season to Chambly. He stayed at Chambly for four seasons, including one in Ligue 2 after promotion from the 2018–19 Championnat National.

In July 2020 he joined US Quevilly-Rouen.

== Career statistics ==
As of 28 November 2020.

Appearances and goals by club, season and competition
Club	Season	League			National Cup		League Cup		Other		Total	
Club	Season	Division	Apps	Goals	Apps	Goals	Apps	Goals	Apps	Goals	Apps	Goals
Monaco II	2008–09	CFA	14	0	–		–		–		14	0
Monaco II	2009–10	CFA 2	11	3	–		–		–		11	3
Monaco II	2010–11	CFA	14	4	–		–		–		14	4
Monaco II	2011–12	CFA	21	3	–		–		–		21	3
Monaco II	2012–13	CFA	23	4	–		–		–		23	4
Monaco II	Total		83	14	0	0	0	0	0	0	83	14
Portsmouth	2013–14	League Two	18	1	0	0	1	0	3	0	22	1
Fréjus	2014–15	National	33	2	0	0	0	0	0	0	29	2
Les Herbiers	2015–16	National	30	3	1	0	0	0	0	0	31	3
Chambly	2016–17	National	30	6	3	1	0	0	0	0	33	7
Chambly	2017–18	National	29	2	7	0	0	0	0	0	36	2
Chambly	2018–19	National	25	1	1	0	0	0	0	0	26	1
Chambly	2019–20	Ligue 2	10	1	2	0	1	0	0	0	13	1
Chambly	Total		94	10	13	1	1	0	0	0	108	11
Chambly B	2018–19	National 3	3	0	—		—		—		3	0
Chambly B	2019–20	National 3	4	0	—		—		—		4	0
Chambly B	Total		7	0	—		—		—		7	0
Quevilly-Rouen	2020–21	National	11	1	0	0	0	0	0	0	11	1
Career total			276	31	14	1	2	0	3	0	295	32
