= 2013–14 Football League Trophy =

Johnstone's Paint Trophy

Tournament details
- Country: England; Wales
- Teams: 48

Final positions
- Champions: Peterborough United
- Runners-up: Chesterfield

Tournament statistics
- Matches played: 49
- Goals scored: 142 (2.9 per match)
- Top goal scorer(s): (England) Danny Philliskirk Oldham Athletic (6 goals)

The 2013–14 Football League Trophy, known as the Johnstone's Paint Trophy for sponsorship reasons, was the 33rd season in the history of the competition. It is a knock-out tournament for English football clubs in League One and League Two, the third and fourth tiers of the English Football League.

In all, 48 clubs entered the competition. It was split into two sections, Northern and Southern, with the winners of each section contesting the final at Wembley Stadium. Crewe Alexandra were the defending champions, but were eliminated in the Second Round.

Peterborough United of League One won the competition for the first time in their history, defeating League Two side Chesterfield in the final 3–1.

== First round ==
The draw for the first round took place on 17 August 2013. Sixteen clubs were awarded a bye into the second round, and the remaining 32 clubs, including the holders, were divided into four geographical regions. All ties were played during the week commencing 2 September 2013.

=== Northern section ===
North-West

3 September 2013	Tranmere Rovers	1–2	Fleetwood Town	Prenton Park, Birkenhead
19:00	Horwood 37'	Report	Matt 48', 66'	Attendance: 1,937; Referee: Carl Boyeson

3 September 2013	Port Vale	2–1	Bury	Vale Park, Burslem
19:15	Pope 80', 90'	Report	Sedgwick 71'	Attendance: 2,351; Referee: David Coote

3 September 2013	Crewe Alexandra	1–0	Accrington Stanley	Alexandra Stadium, Crewe
19:30	Aneke 79'	Report		Attendance: 2,077; Referee: Tony Harrington

3 September 2013	Shrewsbury Town	1–4	Oldham Athletic	Greenhous Meadow, Shrewsbury
19:30	Burke 45'	Report	Philliskirk 9', 26'; Rooney 42'; Schmeltz 75'	Attendance: 1,748; Referee: Seb Stockbridge

North-East

3 September 2013	Hartlepool United	5–0	Bradford City	Victoria Park, Hartlepool
19:00	James 24'; Franks 48'; Burgess 56'; Compton 59' (pen.); Rodney 87'	Report		Attendance: 1,740; Referee: Richard Clark

3 September 2013	Notts County	1–0	Burton Albion	Meadow Lane, Nottingham
19:45	McGregor 39'	Report		Attendance: 1,240; Referee: Darren Bond

3 September 2013	Scunthorpe United	0–0 (3–5 p)	Sheffield United	Glanford Park, Scunthorpe
19:45		Report		Attendance: 2,352; Referee: Jeremy Simpson
	Penalties
	Burton (penalty scored); Dawson (penalty scored); Welsh (penalty missed); Hawkridge (penalty scored)		(penalty scored) Collins; (penalty scored) Baxter; (penalty scored) Coady; (penalty scored) Taylor; (penalty scored) McGinty

3 September 2013	Wolverhampton Wanderers	2–2 (4–2 p)	Walsall	Molineux, Wolverhampton
19:45	McAlinden 5'; Sako 63'	Report	Hemmings 54'; Hewitt 85'	Attendance: 13,481; Referee: Darren Deadman
	Penalties
	Sigurðarson (penalty scored); Sako (penalty scored); Doherty (penalty scored); Davis (penalty scored)		(penalty missed) Westcarr; (penalty missed) Taylor; (penalty scored) Mantom; (penalty scored) Downing

Byes

Carlisle United, Morecambe, Preston North End, Rochdale, Chesterfield, Mansfield Town, Rotherham United, York City.

=== Southern section ===
South-West

3 September 2013	Exeter City	0–2	Wycombe Wanderers	St James Park, Exeter
19:15		Report	McClure 29'; Stewart 83'	Attendance: 1,654; Referee: Steve Bratt

3 September 2013	Cheltenham Town	3–3 (4–5 p)	Plymouth Argyle	Abbey Business Stadium, Cheltenham
19:45	Gillespie 5', 61'; Taylor 67'	Report	Boco 15'; Alessandra 17'; Bencherif 57'	Attendance: 1,236; Referee: Mark Heywood
	Penalties
	Lowe (penalty scored); Noble (penalty scored); Deering (penalty scored); Taylor (penalty scored); Harrison (penalty missed)		(penalty scored) Boco; (penalty scored) Alessandra; (penalty scored) Hourihane; (penalty scored) Reckord; (penalty scored) Morgan

3 September 2013	Torquay United	0–0 (3–5 p)	Portsmouth	Plainmoor, Torquay
19:45		Report		Attendance: 1,951; Referee: Keith Hill
	Penalties
	Hawley (penalty scored); Ball (penalty scored); Mansell (penalty missed); Tonge (penalty scored)		(penalty scored) Bradley; (penalty scored) Wallace; (penalty scored) Holmes; (penalty scored) Craddock; (penalty scored) Moutaouakil

4 September 2013	Bristol City	2–1	Bristol Rovers	Ashton Gate, Bristol
19:45	Emmanuel-Thomas 12'; Bryan 76'	Report	McChrystal 59'	Attendance: 17,888; Referee: Simon Hooper

South-East

3 September 2013	Brentford	5–3	AFC Wimbledon	Griffin Park, London
19:00	El Alagui 41', 54'; Norris 52'; Nugent 64'; Javi Venta 69'	Report	Fenlon 56'; Francomb 82'; Sweeney 90'	Attendance: 4,189; Referee: Lee Collins

3 September 2013	Dagenham & Redbridge	4–1	Colchester United	London Borough of Barking & Dagenham Stadium, Dagenham
19:00	Elito 53'; Saah 64'; Ogogo 78'; Dennis 85'	Report	Wilson 38'	Attendance: 1,050; Referee: Charles Breakspear

3 September 2013	Gillingham	1–3	Leyton Orient	MEMS Priestfield Stadium, Gillingham
19:00	Dack 68'	Report	Batt 26' (pen.), 45', 59'	Attendance: 1,630; Referee: Michael Bull

3 September 2013	Milton Keynes Dons	2–0	Northampton Town	Stadium mk, Denbigh
19:45	Bamford 53'; Alli 58'	Report		Attendance: 4,299; Referee: Graham Horwood

Byes

Crawley Town, Newport County, Oxford United, Swindon Town, Coventry City, Peterborough United, Southend United, Stevenage.

== Second round ==
The draw for the second round took place on 7 September 2013. The sixteen clubs that progressed from the first round were joined by the sixteen that had been awarded a bye at that stage. All ties were played on 8 October 2013.

=== Northern section ===
North-West

8 October 2013	Port Vale	0–1	Rochdale	Vale Park, Burslem
19:30 BST			Rafferty 40'	Attendance: 2,612

8 October 2013	Fleetwood Town	4–0	Crewe Alexandra	Highbury Stadium, Fleetwood
19:45 BST	Ball 40'; Parkin 44'; Pond 47'; Blair 90'			Attendance: 1,928

8 October 2013	Morecambe	0–0 (3–4 p)	Carlisle United	Globe Arena, Morecambe
19:45 BST				Attendance: 2,297

8 October 2013	Preston North End	0–2	Oldham Athletic	Deepdale, Preston
19:45 BST			Philliskirk 2'; Wesolowski 9'	Attendance: 5,987

North-East

8 October 2013	Mansfield Town	0–1	Chesterfield	One Call Stadium, Mansfield
19:45 BST			McSheffrey 72'	Attendance: 4,834

8 October 2013	Sheffield United	0–1	Hartlepool United	Bramall Lane, Sheffield
19:45 BST			Poole 37'	Attendance: 4,189

8 October 2013	Wolverhampton Wanderers	0–0 (1–3 p)	Notts County	Molineux, Wolverhampton
19:45 BST				Attendance: 7,166

8 October 2013	York City	0–3	Rotherham United	Bootham Crescent, York
19:45 BST			Smith 17' (o.g.); Agard 63'; Revell 69'	Attendance: 2,372

=== Southern section ===
South-West

8 October 2013	Crawley Town	2–3	Newport County	Checkatrade.com Stadium, Crawley
19:00 BST	Sinclair 13'; Jones 23'		Zebroski 43'; Chapman 48'; Essam 61' (o.g.)	Attendance: 1,350; Referee: Rob Lewis

8 October 2013	Oxford United	1–2	Portsmouth	Kassam Stadium, Oxford
19:45 BST	Constable 90'		Agyemang 66'; Marquis 83'	Attendance: 3,697

8 October 2013	Swindon Town	2–1	Plymouth Argyle	County Ground, Swindon
19:45 BST	Barthram 19'; Ajose 46'		Blackman 7'	Attendance: 4,211

8 October 2013	Wycombe Wanderers	2–1	Bristol City	Adams Park, High Wycombe
19:45 BST	Knott 9'; Bloomfield 27'		Moloney 56'	Attendance: 1,279

South-East

8 October 2013	Leyton Orient	0–0 (4–2 p)	Coventry City	Matchroom Stadium, London
19:30 BST				Attendance: 2,151
	Penalties
	Mooney (penalty scored); Omozusi (penalty scored); Sawyer (penalty scored); James (penalty scored)		Clarke (penalty scored); Clarke (penalty scored)

8 October 2013	Peterborough United	2–1	Brentford	London Road, Peterborough
19:30 BST	Taylor 18' (o.g.); McCann 70' (pen.)		Nugent 79'	Attendance: 5,261

8 October 2013	Southend United	2–5	Dagenham & Redbridge	Roots Hall, Southend-on-Sea
19:45 BST	Cauley Woodrow 51', 53'		Hines 26', 60'; Saah 58'; Dickson 64'; Obafemi 66'	Attendance: 3,236

8 October 2013	Stevenage	2–1	Milton Keynes Dons	Lamex Stadium, Stevenage
19:45 BST	Zoko 51'; Morais 61'		Williams 25'	Attendance: 1,456

== Area quarter-finals ==
The draw for the area quarter-finals took place on 12 October 2013, on Soccer AM. All ties to be played during the week commencing 11 November 2013.

=== Northern section ===
12 November 2013	Oldham Athletic	5–1	Notts County	Boundary Park, Oldham
19:45 GMT	Tarkowski 30'; Philliskirk 45' (pen.), 84'; Dayton 67'; Clarke-Harris 90+6'	Report	Murray 13'	Attendance: 2,646; Referee: Andy Haines

12 November 2013	Chesterfield	3–0	Rochdale	Proact Stadium, Chesterfield
19:45 GMT	Banks 45+2', 79'; Gnanduillet 73'	Report		Attendance: 2,897; Referee: Chris Sarginson

12 November 2013	Hartlepool United	1–2	Rotherham United	Victoria Park, Hartlepool
19:00 GMT	Monkhouse 24'	Report	Eaves 9'; Agard 45'	Attendance: 2,911; Referee: Darren Drysdale

13 November 2013	Fleetwood Town	2–0	Carlisle United	Highbury Stadium, Fleetwood
19:45 GMT	Ball 5'; Sarcevic 54'	Report		Attendance: 2,446; Referee: Stuart Attwell

=== Southern section ===
12 November 2013	Swindon Town	2–1	Wycombe Wanderers	County Ground, Swindon
19:45 GMT	Ajose 78', 90+4'	Report	McClure 45+1'	Attendance: 3,940; Referee: Carl Berry

12 November 2013	Newport County	3–0	Portsmouth	Rodney Parade, Newport
19:45 GMT	Washington 5', 83'; Oshilaja 19'	Report		Attendance: 2,849; Referee: Graham Scott

12 November 2013	Peterborough United	1–0	Dagenham & Redbridge	London Road, Peterborough
19:45 GMT	Assombalonga 57'	Report		Attendance: 4,830; Referee: Mark Haywood

12 November 2013	Stevenage	3–2	Leyton Orient	Broadhall Way, Stevenage
19:45 GMT	Zoko 2'; Akins 12'; Morais 16' (pen.)	Report	Mooney 14'; James 45+3' (pen.)	Attendance: 1,532; Referee: James Adcock

== Area semi-finals ==
The draw for the area semi-finals took place on 16 November 2013, on Soccer AM. All ties to be played during the week commencing 9 December 2013.

=== Northern section ===
10 December 2013	Fleetwood Town	2–1	Rotherham United	Highbury Stadium, Fleetwood
19:45 GMT	Hughes 19'; McLaughlin 70'	Report	Dicko 56'	Attendance: 2,224; Referee: Scott Duncan

10 December 2013	Oldham Athletic	1–1 (5–6 p)	Chesterfield	Boundary Park, Oldham
19:45 GMT	Philliskirk 21'	Report	Darikwa 28'	Attendance: 3,534; Referee: Kevin Wright
	Penalties
	Rooney (penalty scored); Clarke-Harris (penalty scored); Tarkowski (penalty scored); Smith (penalty scored); Grounds (penalty scored)		Richards (penalty scored); Ryan (penalty scored); Doyle (penalty scored); McSheffrey (penalty scored); Darikwa (penalty scored); Talbot (penalty scored)

=== Southern section ===
10 December 2013	Swindon Town	1–1 (3–1 p)	Stevenage	County Ground, Swindon
19:45 GMT	Ajose 24'	Report	Andrade 82'	Attendance: 3,804; Referee: Steve Martin
	Penalties
	Pritchard (penalty scored); El-Gabbas (penalty scored); Kasim (penalty scored)		Zoko (penalty scored)

10 December 2013	Newport County	0–3	Peterborough United	Rodney Parade, Newport
19:45 GMT		Report	Ntlhe 13'; McCann 90+1'; Mendez-Laing 90+5'	Attendance: 1,765; Referee: Trevor Kettle

== Area finals ==
The draw for the area finals took place on 11 December 2013. The first legs of the area finals will be played during the week commencing 3 February 2014. The second legs of the area finals will be played during the week commencing 17 February 2014.

=== Northern section ===
4 February 2014	Fleetwood Town	1–3	Chesterfield	Highbury Stadium, Fleetwood
19:45 GMT	Ball 45'	Report	Evatt 21'; Morsy 24'; Ryan 65'	Attendance: 3,508; Referee: David Coote

18 February 2014	Chesterfield	0–1 (3–2 agg.)	Fleetwood Town	Proact Stadium, Chesterfield
19:45 GMT		Report	Parkin 90'	Attendance: 6,358; Referee: David Webb

=== Southern section ===
5 February 2014	Peterborough United	2–2	Swindon Town	London Road, Peterborough
19:15 GMT	Branco 10' (o.g.); Vassell 14'	Report	Ranger 31'; Brisley 45+4' (o.g.)	Attendance: 3,312; Referee: Paul Tierney

17 February 2014	Swindon Town	1–1 (3–3 agg.) (3–4 p)	Peterborough United	County Ground, Swindon
19:45 GMT	Pritchard 34'	Report	Assombalonga 75'	Attendance: 6,825; Referee: Keith Stroud
	Penalties
	Luongo (penalty missed); Kasim (penalty scored); Pritchard (penalty scored); Archibald-Henville (penalty scored); Reis (penalty missed)		Assombalonga (penalty scored); Bostwick (penalty scored); Swanson (penalty missed); McCann (penalty scored); Rowe (penalty scored)

== Final ==
30 March 2014	Chesterfield	1–3	Peterborough United	Wembley Stadium, London
14:00 BST	Doyle 53'	Report	McQuoid 7'; Brisley 38'; Assombalonga 78' (pen.)	Attendance: 35,663; Referee: Andy D'Urso
