= Nick Awford =

English footballer

Personal information
- Full name: Nicholas Andrew Awford
- Date of birth: 15 April 1995 (age 31)
- Place of birth: Portsmouth, England
- Height: 1.79 m (5 ft 10 1/2 in)
- Position: Central midfielder

Team information
- Current team: Baffins Milton Rovers

Youth career
- Portsmouth

Senior career*
Years	Team	Apps	(Gls)
2013–2015	Portsmouth	2	(0)
2013	→ Gosport Borough (loan)	1	(0)
2013	→ Chelmsford City (loan)	0	(0)
2014	→ Bognor Regis (loan)	2	(0)
2015	Havant & Waterlooville	6	(0)
2015	Farnborough	4	(0)
2016	Winchester City		
2016–2017	Petersfield Town		
2022–	Baffins Milton Rovers		
- * Club domestic league appearances and goals as of 01:16, 5 August 2026 (UTC)

Nicholas Andrew Awford (born 15 April 1995) is an English footballer who plays for Baffins Milton Rovers as a central midfielder.

== Club career ==
=== Portsmouth ===
Awford was born in Portsmouth, and began his footballing career at Portsmouth's Academy.

On 9 February 2011, Awford signed a two-year scholarship deal with Pompey. Although he then spent most of the 2012–13 season with the Academy (managed by his father, Andy Awford), Nick Awford was promoted to the first team squad on 6 April 2013. He was named among the substitutes in a 0–0 draw against Stevenage, but he did not leave the bench. He was also on the bench in the following weekend, in a 3–2 away loss against Brentford.

Awford made his Portsmouth debut on 20 April, replacing Johnny Ertl in the dying minutes of a 3–0 home win against Sheffield United. It was his maiden appearance of the campaign.

On 30 August, Awford was loaned to Gosport Borough, in a one-month deal. Two months later, he joined Chelmsford City on the same terms.

On 27 February 2015, after having another temporary spell at Bognor Regis Town, Awford was released by Portsmouth.

=== Havant & Waterlooville ===
A day after being released by Pompey, Awford joined Havant & Waterlooville in a permanent deal until the end of the season.

== Career statistics ==
As of 15 March 2015

Appearances and goals by club, season and competition
Club	Season	League		FA Cup		League Cup		Other		Total	
Club	Season	Apps	Goals	Apps	Goals	Apps	Goals	Apps	Goals	Apps	Goals
Portsmouth	2012–13	1	0	0	0	0	0	–		1	0
Portsmouth	2013–14	0	0	0	0	0	0	–		0	0
Portsmouth	2014–15	1	0	0	0	1	0	2	0	4	0
Portsmouth	Total	2	0	0	0	1	0	2	0	5	0
Gosport Borough (loan)	2013–14	1	0	0	0	0	0	0	0	1	0
Chelmsford City (loan)	2013–14	0	0	0	0	0	0	0	0	0	0
Bognor Regis (loan)	2013–14	2	0	0	0	0	0	1	0	3	0
Havant & Waterlooville	2014–15	3	0	0	0	0	0	0	0	3	0
Career total		8	0	0	0	1	0	3	0	12	0
