= Andy Awford =

English footballer and coach

Personal information
- Full name: Andrew Terry Awford
- Date of birth: 14 July 1972 (age 54)
- Place of birth: Worcester, England
- Height: 5 ft 9 in (1.75 m)
- Position: Defender

Senior career*
Years	Team	Apps	(Gls)
1987–1989	Worcester City		
1989–2000	Portsmouth	313	(3)

International career
1992–1993	England U21	10	(0)

Managerial career
- 2000–2006: Portsmouth Academy (scout)
- 2006–2007: Oxford United (Assistant coach)
- 2008–2009: Bognor Regis Town (Assistant coach)
- 2011–2014: Portsmouth Academy
- 2013: Portsmouth (caretaker)
- 2014: Portsmouth (caretaker)
- 2014–2015: Portsmouth
- 2015: Luton Town (Development Manager)
- 2015–2016: Luton Town (caretaker)
- * Club domestic league appearances and goals

Andrew Terry Awford (born 14 July 1972) is an English football coach and former footballer who was most recently the Youth Academy and Development Manager at Luton Town. Prior to this, he was the manager of Portsmouth, a club where he spent the vast majority of his playing and coaching career. Awford was selected by the FA in 2012 to participate on their new level 5 qualification, The FA Professional / Elite Award, which he successfully completed and graduated in June 2013 at St Georges Park.

== Playing career ==
Awford began his career at his home-town club Worcester City where he became the youngest player ever to appear in the FA Cup, aged just 15 years 88 days, when he came on as substitute in a tie at Boreham Wood.

He went on to sign professional terms with Second Division side Portsmouth in 1989 at the age of 16, making almost 400 first-team appearances in an 11-year career. Awford was part of the "Pompey" side that reached the FA Cup semi-final in 1992, losing to Liverpool in a penalty shootout. In his time at the club, he also played ten times for the England under-21s.

In 1994, Awford suffered a succession of injuries, including a broken leg, which kept him from playing for 14 months. He went on to play in subsequent campaigns, but further injuries throughout the 2000–01 season led him to retire from professional football at the age of 28. His last competitive appearance for "Pompey" came against Queens Park Rangers on 4 November 2000.

== Coaching career ==
After retiring, Awford took up the position of chief scout and later reserve team manager at Portsmouth. In April 2006, he was appointed the first team coach at Oxford United under his former Portsmouth manager Jim Smith and in June 2008 became assistant manager of Bognor Regis Town. Awford resigned along with manager Mick Jenkins in January 2009.

He obtained a UEFA 'A' Licence and worked as a PE Teacher in Petersfield before returning to Portsmouth as the club's Academy Manager in February 2011. Following Michael Appleton's move to Blackpool in November 2012, Guy Whittingham was made caretaker manager of Portsmouth with Awford appointed as his assistant. Despite being given only temporary roles, the pair remained in charge for the rest of the 2012–13 season. In June 2013 Awford graduated from The FA Professional / Elite level 5 accreditation. In November 2013, Whittingham, who had been named as permanent manager, was sacked and Awford named as caretaker manager. On 9 December, Richie Barker was named as permanent manager with Awford returning to work with the club's academy.

On 27 March 2014, Barker left on mutual terms and Awford was named caretaker manager until the end of the 2013–14 season. Awford won his first five matches in charge to ensure Portsmouth would avoid relegation from The Football League. Awford subsequently won April's League Two Manager of the Month.

On 1 May 2014, it was announced that Awford would be appointed as Portsmouth manager on a permanent basis on a one-year rolling contract. Awford won the League Two Manager of the Month award for February during the 2014–15 season following an unbeaten month, guiding the club to four wins and two draws. However, a poor run of form in the next ten games led to Awford leaving Portsmouth by mutual consent on 13 April 2015, with the club sitting in 14th position in the table.

On 26 June 2015, Awford joined Luton Town as Youth Academy and Development Manager. Awford took over as caretaker manager following John Still's sacking in December 2015, leading the club to one win, a draw and two losses. Awford returned to his academy role following the appointment of Nathan Jones as permanent Luton manager in January 2016. Awford left Luton in April 2022.

== Managerial statistics ==
As of 6 January 2016

Managerial record by team and tenure
Team	From	To	Record				
Team	From	To	P	W	D	L	Win %
Portsmouth (caretaker)	25 November 2013	9 December 2013	3	0	2	1	0.0
Portsmouth (caretaker)	27 March 2014	1 May 2014	7	5	2	0	71.4
Portsmouth	1 May 2014	13 April 2015	48	15	15	18	31.3
Luton Town (caretaker)	17 December 2015	6 January 2016	4	1	1	2	25.0
Total			62	21	20	21	33.9

== Honours ==
Individual

- League Two Manager of the Month (2): April 2014, February 2015

== Personal life ==
Awford has a son, Nick, who progressed through the Portsmouth Academy and currently plays for Farnborough.
