= Shaun Cooper =

English footballer and manager

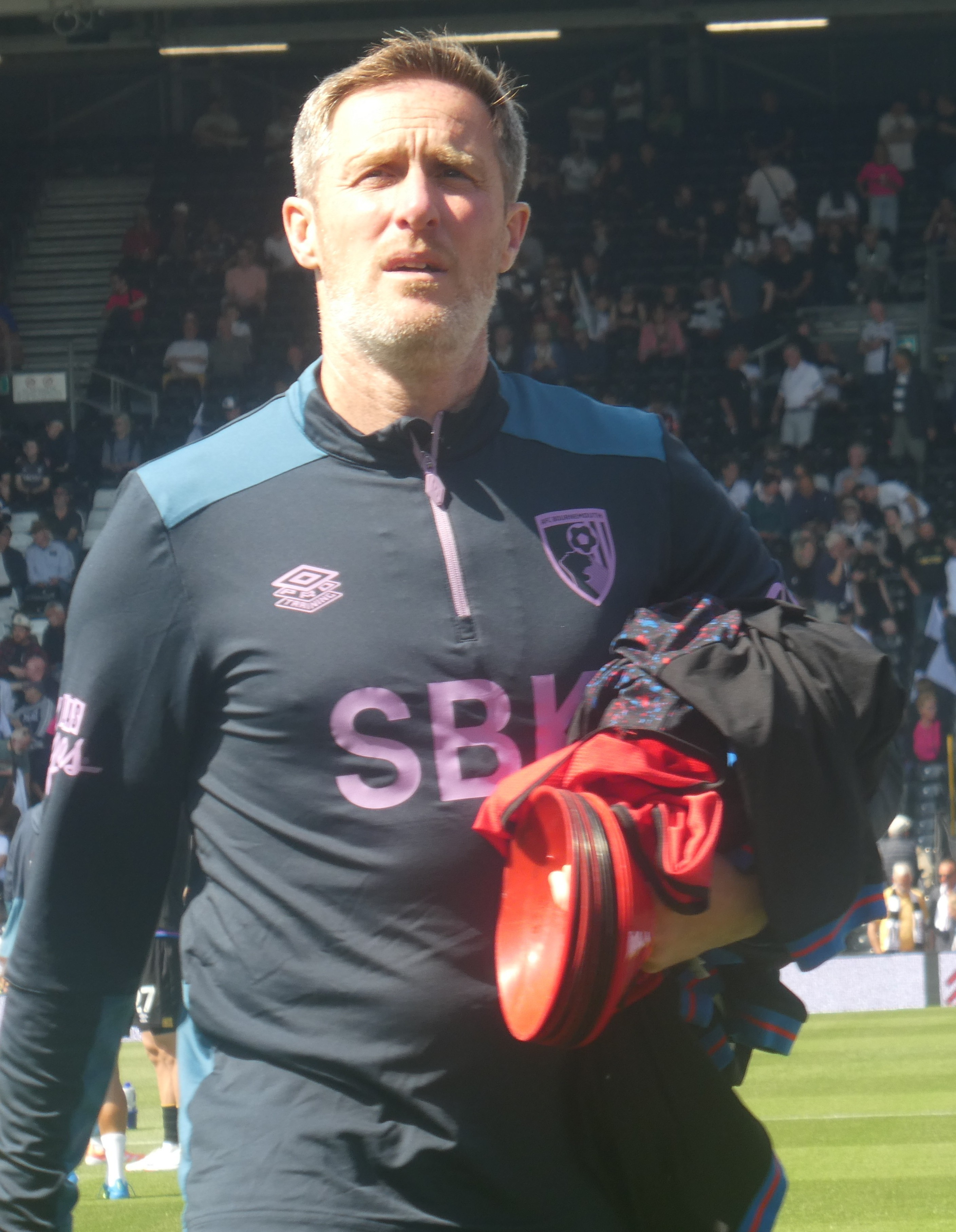
- Cooper in 2026

Personal information
- Full name: Shaun David Cooper
- Date of birth: 5 October 1983 (age 43)
- Place of birth: Newport, Isle of Wight
- Height: 1.78 m (5 ft 10 in)
- Position: Defender

Team information
- Current team: Liverpool (first-team coach)

Senior career*
Years	Team	Apps	(Gls)
2000–2005	Portsmouth	7	(0)
2003–2004	→ Leyton Orient (loan)	9	(0)
2004	→ Kidderminster Harriers (loan)	10	(0)
2005–2012	AFC Bournemouth	211	(1)
2012–2013	Crawley Town	8	(0)
2013	→ Portsmouth (loan)	14	(2)
2013–2014	Portsmouth	10	(0)
2014	Torquay United	0	(0)
2014–2016	Sutton United	48	(1)
2016	→ Eastbourne Borough (loan)	5	(0)
2016–2017	Poole Town	29	(1)
Total		351	(5)
- * Club domestic league appearances and goals

Shaun David Cooper (born 5 October 1983) is an English professional football coach and former player who is currently an first-team coach at Premier League club Liverpool.

== Career ==
Cooper was a product of Portsmouth's youth system. He made his debut for the club in a 0–0 draw at Crystal Palace in March 2002 and featured in six more games in the remainder of the campaign. However, he failed to break into the first team the next season, as Portsmouth won the Division One title. Despite this he was offered a new two-year contract. He spent most of the 2003–04 season on loan at Leyton Orient, playing nine games.

The next season (2004–05) he was again loaned out, this time to Kidderminster Harriers.

Cooper left the club in June 2005, signing for AFC Bournemouth on a free transfer. After spending seven years at the club, he was offered a new contract at a reduced wage by new manager Paul Groves; turning this down, he left the club.

On 25 June 2012, Cooper joined Crawley Town on a free transfer. Six months later, he joined Portsmouth on loan. He scored his first goal for Portsmouth on 13 April 2013, against Brentford. It was subsequently confirmed that his contract with Crawley would not be renewed at the end of the season, and Cooper thus became a free agent. In July 2013, he had a trial at Torquay United, but failed to earn a contract.

Cooper re-joined Portsmouth until January 2014 on 5 September 2013, for his third spell with the club.

On 9 January 2014 Portsmouth confirmed that Cooper had left the club following the expiration of his short-term contract.

On 17 January 2014, Cooper signed for Torquay United on a potential 18-month contract.

Cooper's contract with Torquay United was cancelled by mutual consent in July 2014.

Cooper switched to Sutton United for the 2014/15 season and signed on a month's loan to Eastbourne Borough in September 2016.

== Career statistics ==
As of match played 2 December 2017

Appearances and goals by club, season and competition
Club	Season	League			FA Cup		League Cup		Other		Total	
Club	Season	Division	Apps	Goals	Apps	Goals	Apps	Goals	Apps	Goals	Apps	Goals
Portsmouth	2001–02	First Division	7	0	0	0	0	0	—		7	0
Leyton Orient (loan)	2003–04	Third Division	9	0	0	0	0	0	0	0	9	0
Kidderminster Harriers (loan)	2004–05	League Two	10	0	1	0	0	0	1 (Note: Appearances in the Football League Trophy)	0	12	0
AFC Bournemouth	2005–06	League One	35	0	1	0	2	0	2	0	40	0
AFC Bournemouth	2006–07	League One	33	0	2	0	1	0	0	0	36	0
AFC Bournemouth	2007–08	League One	38	1	3	1	1	0	2	0	44	2
AFC Bournemouth	2008–09	League Two	37	0	3	0	1	0	3	0	44	0
AFC Bournemouth	2009–10	League Two	6	0	0	0	0	0	0	0	6	0
AFC Bournemouth	2010–11	League One	36	0	0	0	1	0	2 (Note: Appearances in the League One play-offs)	0	39	0
AFC Bournemouth	2011-12	League One	26	0	1	0	2	1	2	0	31	1
AFC Bournemouth	Total		211	1	10	1	8	1	11	0	240	3
Crawley Town	2012-13	League One	8	0	0	0	1	0	1	0	10	0
Portsmouth	2012–13	League One	14	2	0	0	—		0	0	14	2
Portsmouth	2013–14	League Two	9	0	0	0	0	0	2	0	11	0
Portsmouth	Total		23	2	0	0	0	0	2	0	25	2
Torquay United	2013–14	League Two	0	0	0	0	0	0	0	0	0	0
Sutton United	2014–15	Conference South	24	1	0	0	—		2 (Note: One appearance in the FA Trophy and one in the Surrey Senior Cup)	0	26	1
Sutton United	2015–16	National League South	22	0	3	0	—		7 (Note: Four appearances in the FA Trophy and three in the Surrey Senior Cup)	0	32	0
Sutton United	2016–17	National League	2	0	0	0	—		0	0	4	0
Sutton United	Total		48	1	3	0	0	0	11	0	62	1
Eastbourne Borough (loan)	2016–17	National League South	5	0	2	0	—		0	0	7	0
Poole Town	2016–17	National League South	17	0	0	0	—		2 (Note: Appearances in the FA Trophy)	0	19	0
Poole Town	2017–18	National League South	12	1	0	0	—		0	0	12	1
Poole Town	Total		29	1	0	0	0	0	2	0	31	1
Career total			350	5	16	1	9	1	28	0	403	7
