= Tom Craddock =

English footballer

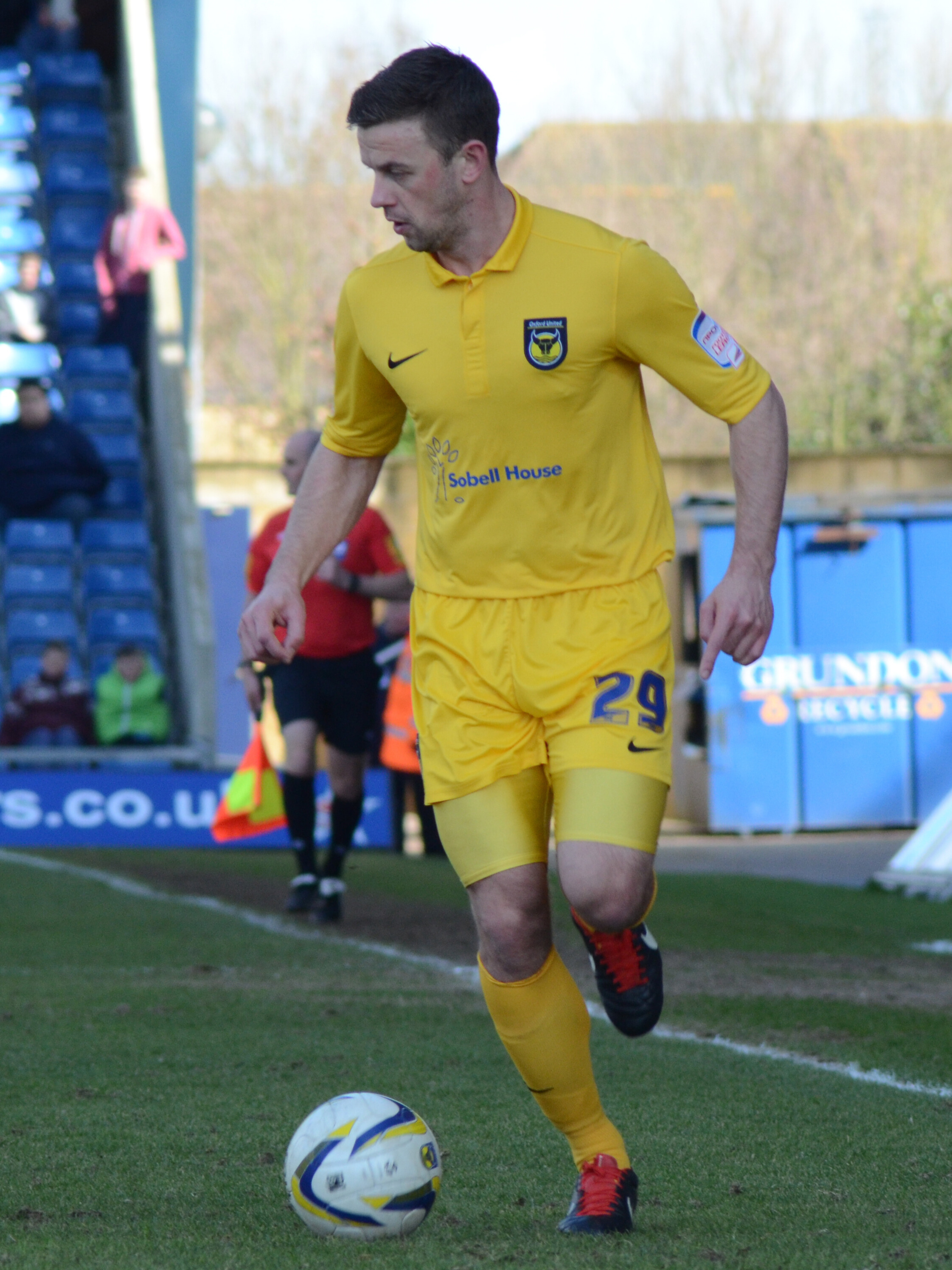
- Craddock playing for Oxford United in 2013

Personal information
- Full name: Thomas Craddock
- Date of birth: 14 October 1986 (age 40)
- Place of birth: Darlington, England
- Position: Striker

Youth career
- –2005: Middlesbrough

Senior career*
Years	Team	Apps	(Gls)
2005–2009	Middlesbrough	4	(0)
2006	→ Wrexham (loan)	1	(1)
2008	→ Hartlepool United (loan)	4	(0)
2008–2009	→ Luton Town (loan)	8	(4)
2009–2010	Luton Town	67	(31)
2010–2013	Oxford United	80	(25)
2013–2015	Portsmouth	8	(1)
2015–2016	Guiseley	31	(2)
2016–2017	Spennymoor Town		
- * Club domestic league appearances and goals

Thomas Craddock (born 14 October 1986) is an English retired professional footballer who played for multiple clubs including Spennymoor Town, Middlesbrough, and Portsmouth as a striker.

== Career ==
=== Middlesbrough ===
Born in Darlington, County Durham, Craddock came through the youth system at Middlesbrough since joining the academy from Darlington Spraire Lads when he was eleven years old, and was a member of their FA Youth Cup winning side in 2003–04. While at the academy, Craddock suffered a serious shoulder injury, but managed to overcome the injury and started out as attacker role and then switched to defense role before reverting to attacker role. On 12 March 2005, Craddock signed his first professional contract with the club.

He made his first team debut for the club as a substitute in the final game of the 2005–06 season against Fulham, having already scored 20 goals for the reserve team. On 16 June 2006, Craddock signed a contract with the club, keeping him until 2008.

He joined Wrexham on a month's loan from 25 October 2006. He scored the winning goal on his debut for the team; however, the next day it was discovered he had suffered a knee injury, ruling him out for six weeks. After being sidelined for weeks, Craddock scored on his return for the club's reserve match against Leeds United Reserve on 29 November 2006.

In the 2007–08 season, Craddock made a handful of first team appearance at Middlesbrough following a crisis of striker's injury and made two more league appearances for the club. However, Craddock suffered a hernia injury that resulted him having two operation and upon return, his first team opportunities was further limited. On 13 February 2008, Craddock joined League One side Hartlepool United on a month's loan. Craddock made his Hartlepool United debut three days later, where he played 26 minutes, in a 1–1 draw against Cheltenham Town. After making four appearances, Craddock's loan spell with the club came to an end on 18 March 2008 following a one-month loan.

Ahead of the 2008–09 season, he signed a one-year contract extension with Middlesbrough in July 2008.

=== Luton Town ===
On 17 October 2008, Craddock was sent on a one-month loan to Luton Town. This loan was extended in November after Craddock scored three goals in four games, then extended for a further month following more impressive performances, despite injury. Craddock's loan period came to an end in mid-January and Luton sought his services once more, this time lodging a bid of £80,000, which Middlesbrough accepted. On 30 January 2009, Craddock signed a two-and-a-half-year contract with Luton Town.

He scored 12 goals in 30 games for Luton in the 2008–09 season, including a goal in the Hatters' Football League Trophy victory at Wembley Stadium. However, a 30-point deduction imposed upon the club at the start of the season led to Luton's eventual relegation from the Football League, despite Craddock scoring 10 league goals.

In the 2009–10 season, Craddock was linked with a move away from the club to a newly promoted side Leicester City. However, the move never materialised and Craddock stayed at the club, where he finished the season as Luton's top scorer with 24 goals, also finishing as third top scorer in the Conference Premier. On 13 April 2010, Craddock scored a hat-trick (which was also his first professional career) in a 6–3 win over Histon. In addition to his performance, In June 2010, Craddock, along with Claude Gnakpa, were named in the Conference Premier team of the season.

The 2010–11 season saw Craddock scored two goals in four appearances against Fleetwood Town and Tamworth.

=== Oxford United ===
On 31 August 2010, the day of the transfer deadline, Craddock signed for League Two side Oxford United for a fee of £50,000, signing a three-year contract. Upon joining the club, Craddock was given number 29 shirt and revealed how the completed move to Oxford United was almost stalled and the paperwork was filed in time.

After making his Oxford United debut against Morecambe on 4 September 2010, Craddock scored his first Oxford United goal in the next game on 11 September 2010, in a 2–0 win over Hereford United. Throughout January, Craddock scored five goals in six league matches against Torquay United, Aldershot Town, Bradford City, Northampton Town and Cheltenham Town. As a result, Craddock's form earned him a nomination for npower League Two Player of the Month award for January, but lost out to Gillingham's Cody McDonald. In his first season in the football league at Oxford, Craddock was the club's second top scorer with 15 goals, including two against Port Vale, the winner being in the 94th minute.

Before the start of the following season, Craddock sustained a knee injury in the first pre-season game against Didcot Town and was ruled out till November. His first game back was as a substitute in a Football League Trophy fixture against Southend United, in which he was sent off seven minutes after coming on. On his return from suspension and injury in December, Craddock scored the first in a 2–0 win over Northampton Town, only to be ruled out through injury again three games later. He did not play again till the final day of the 2011–12 season at Port Vale.

In the 2012–13 season, Craddock started the season well when he scored twice on 21 August 2012, in a 2–0 win over Southend United. Then on 20 October 2012, he scored four goals in a 5–0 victory over Accrington Stanley. After scoring three more goals, including a brace against Dagenham & Redbridge on 6 November 2012, Craddock was once again nominated for the npower League Two Player of the Month award for January, but lost out to Ashley Vincent. However, Craddock's first team opportunities was soon limited, due to injuries. Despite this, Craddock finished the 2012–13 season as the league top-scorer, alongside Alfie Potter with ten goals.

At the end of the 2012–13 season, Craddock was among twelve players to be released by the club. During his time at Oxford United, Craddock formed a partnership with James Constable.

=== Portsmouth ===
On 13 May 2013, Craddock signed a two-year deal for Portsmouth after being released by Oxford. Upon joining the club, Craddock was given number 10 shirt for the new season after Yassin Moutaouakil switched to number two shirt.

Craddock made his Portsmouth debut, in the opening game of the season, where he played 21 minutes, in a 4–1 home defeat to his former club, Oxford United on 3 August 2013. In the first round of the Johnstone Trophy, Craddock converted the first penalty in the shoot-out, in a 5–3 win over Torquay United after the game went throughout 120 minutes, in a 0–0 draw. It took until 23 November 2013 for Craddock to score his first Portsmouth goal, in a 2–1 loss against Scunthorpe United. However, Craddock struggled in the first team at Portsmouth, due to injury and loss of form that led to being on the substitution bench. In late-November, Craddock suffered a knee injury during the match against Southend United, which is considered as serious.

After being ruled out of the season, Craddock said he's expected to return to training in the pre-season. However, his plan was back-fired, as his recovery was delayed, which ruled him out for the start of the season and eventually throughout 2014. After delays of returning to the pitch, Craddock made his return in the pitch for the first time in two years in a reserve match against Fulham U21, which saw them lost 3–1. After being planned out to be loaned out to as "the best way forward for him", this plan was backfired, however, due to another knee injury that kept him out for three weeks.

At the end of the 2014–15 season, Craddock was released on 18 May 2015 after an injury hit spell. Though he was released by the club, Craddock remained at the club as a trialist, in hopes of earning a contract when he appeared in the club's reserve match. However, Craddock opted to leave the club, due to his judgement call.

=== Later career ===
After going on a trial at Cambridge United, Craddock joined Non-League side Guiseley on 27 July 2015. Craddock made his Guiseley debut, in the opening game of the season, in a 1–0 loss against Welling United. Craddock then scored his first Guiseley goal, in a 4–4 draw against Woking on 12 September 2015 His second goal then came on 26 September 2015, in a 1–0 win over Braintree Town. Despite suffering from fitness concern, Craddock finished the 2015–16 season, making 31 league appearances and scoring two times.

On 8 June 2016, Craddock joined Spennymoor Town, scoring 4 goals in 13 appearances in all competitions during the 2016–17 season. He retired on 1 January 2017.

Tom is now a Teacher of PE at Carmel College, Darlington; which he formerly attended as a student.

== Career statistics ==
As of 1 July 2016

Appearances and goals by club, country and competition
Club	Season	League			FA Cup		League Cup		Other		Total	
Club	Season	Division	Apps	Goals	Apps	Goals	Apps	Goals	Apps	Goals	Apps	Goals
Middlesbrough	2005–06	Premier League	1	0	0	0	0	0	—		1	0
Middlesbrough	2006–07	Premier League	0	0	0	0	0	0	—		0	0
Middlesbrough	2007–08	Premier League	3	0	0	0	1	0	—		4	0
Middlesbrough	2008–09	Premier League	0	0	0	0	0	0	—		0	0
Middlesbrough	Total		4	0	0	0	1	0	0	0	5	0
Wrexham (loan)	2006–07	League Two	1	1	0	0	0	0	0	0	1	1
Hartlepool United (loan)	2007–08	League One	4	0	0	0	—		0	0	4	0
Luton Town	2008–09 (Note: Part of this season was spent on loan from Middlesbrough)	League Two	27	10	0	0	—		3 (Note: Appearances in the Football League Trophy)	2	30	12
Luton Town	2009–10	Conference Premier	44	23	5	1	—		3 (Note: One appearance in the FA Trophy and two in the Conference Premier play-offs)	0	52	24
Luton Town	2010–11	Conference Premier	4	2	—		—		—		4	2
Luton Town	Total		75	35	5	1	0	0	6	2	86	38
Oxford United	2010–11	League Two	39	14	1	0	—		0	0	40	14
Oxford United	2011–12	League Two	9	1	0	0	0	0	1	0	10	1
Oxford United	2012–13	League Two	32	10	2	0	1	0	3	2	38	12
Oxford United	Total		80	25	3	0	1	0	4	2	88	27
Portsmouth	2013–14	League Two	8	1	0	0	1	0	2	0	11	1
Portsmouth	2014–15	League Two	0	0	0	0	0	0	0	0	0	0
Portsmouth	Total		8	1	0	0	1	0	2	0	11	1
Guiseley	2015–16	National League	31	2	2	0	—		3 (Note: Two appearances and one goal in the FA Trophy, one appearance in the West Riding County Cup)	1	36	3
Career total			203	64	10	1	3	0	15	5	231	70

== Honours ==
Middlesbrough

- FA Youth Cup: 2003–04

Luton Town

- Football League Trophy: 2008–09
