= Danny East =

English footballer

Personal information
- Date of birth: 23 January 1992 (age 34)
- Place of birth: Hessle, England
- Positions: Winger; centre-forward

Team information
- Current team: North Ferriby

Youth career
- 1998–2003: Hessle Sporting
- 2003–2011: Hull City

Senior career*
Years	Team	Apps	(Gls)
2011–2013	Hull City	2	(0)
2012	→ Northampton Town (loan)	21	(0)
2013	→ Gillingham (loan)	2	(0)
2013–2015	Portsmouth	23	(1)
2015	→ Aldershot Town (loan)	6	(0)
2015–2016	Grimsby Town	32	(0)
2016–2018	Guiseley	32	(0)
2018–2019	Bradford Park Avenue	19	(2)
2019–2020	Alfreton Town	29	(2)
2020–	North Ferriby		
- * Club domestic league appearances and goals as of 15:05, 24 November 2017 (UTC)

Daniel East (born 23 January 1992) is an English footballer who plays as a forward for North Ferriby.

He has notably played professionally for Hull City, Northampton Town, Portsmouth, Gillingham, Aldershot Town and Grimsby Town.

== Career ==
=== Hull City ===
Born in Hessle, East Riding of Yorkshire, East progressed through the Hull City youth ranks and has been with the club since 2003. He was offered his first professional contract at the club in the summer of 2010.

He made his professional debut on 9 August 2011 for Hull City, in the Football League Cup 2–0 defeat to Macclesfield Town at the KC Stadium. Despite this, East says his debut was "proud day for him" and that he played pretty well. His second appearance came on 28 January 2012, in a FA Cup 0–1 defeat against Crawley Town. At the end of 2012–13 season, he was released by Hull.

==== Loan to Northampton Town ====
On 29 August, East moved to Northampton Town on a month-long loan. He made his debut a day later, in a Football League Cup 1–3 defeat against Wolverhampton. On 1 September, he made his league debut, in a 2–3 defeat against Plymouth. On 2 October, his loan was extended until 5 January 2013. He returned to Hull with 21 appearances.

==== Loan to Gillingham ====
On 7 March 2013 he joined Gillingham on loan until the end of the season. Two days later, he made his Gills debut, in a 2–1 win against Plymouth. His second appearance came on the 12th, against Exeter City.

=== Portsmouth ===
On 9 May 2013, East signed a two-year deal with League Two side Portsmouth. Upon joining Portsmouth, East was given number 4 shirt.

He made his debut for the club on 10 August 2013, in a 2–2 draw against Accrington Stanley. Since then, East played at left-back, right-back and in the centre of midfield. However, during a match against Wycombe Wanderers, which resulted a 2–2 draw, East was substituted and carried off with a stretcher after he "falling awkwardly as he went up for a header." Following this, East was taken to hospital. On 26 December 2013, East made his return from injury, in a 1–0 win over Dagenham & Redbridge. But in the next match, against Northampton Town on 29 December 2013, he received man of the match but sustained ankle injury that left him out for three months, he also was in League 2 team of the week. After three months out, East returned to training following his recovery on his ankle. He scored his first goal on his return from injury where he "struck after minutes, volleying over keeper Matt Duke from 10 yards", as Portsmouth beat Northampton Town 1–0 on 21 April 2014.

==== Loan to Aldershot Town ====
East joined non-league Aldershot Town on a one-month loan deal on 13 January 2015. He returned to Portsmouth shortly after, and was released when his contract expired at the end of the season.

=== Grimsby Town ===
On 12 June 2015, East signed for National League side Grimsby Town on a one-year contract, following his release from Portsmouth. East was part of the team that beat Forest Green Rovers 3–1 in the 2016 National League play-off final at Wembley, seeing Grimsby promoted to League Two after a six-year absence from the Football League. East left the club when his contract expired at the end of the season.

=== Non League career ===
Upon leaving Grimsby, East has gone on to appear for Guiseley, Bradford Park Avenue, Alfreton Town, and North Ferriby.

== Career statistics ==
As of match played 21 November 2017

Appearances and goals by club, season and competition
Club	Season	League			FA Cup		League Cup		Other		Total	
Club	Season	Division	Apps	Goals	Apps	Goals	Apps	Goals	Apps	Goals	Apps	Goals
Hull City	2011–12	Championship	0	0	1	0	1	0	—		2	0
Hull City	2012–13	Championship	0	0	—		—		—		0	0
Hull City	Hull City total		0	0	1	0	1	0	0	0	2	0
Northampton Town (loan)	2012–13	League Two	14	0	2	0	1	0	2 (Note: Appearances in the Football League Trophy)	0	19	0
Gillingham (loan)	2012–13	League Two	2	0	—		—		—		2	0
Portsmouth	2013–14	League Two	15	1	1	0	1	0	2	0	19	1
Portsmouth	2014–15	League Two	4	0	0	0	0	0	0	0	4	0
Portsmouth	Portsmouth total		19	1	1	0	1	0	2	0	23	1
Aldershot Town (loan)	2014–15	Conference Premier	6	0	—		—		—		6	0
Grimsby Town	2015–16	National League	25	0	1	0	—		7 (Note: Six appearances in the FA Trophy and one in the National League play-offs)	0	33	0
Guiseley	2016–17	National League	16	0	0	0	—		0	0	16	0
Guiseley	2017–18	National League	5	0	0	0	—		0	0	5	0
Guiseley	Guiseley total		21	0	0	0	0	0	0	0	21	0
Career total			87	1	5	0	3	0	11	0	106	1

== Honours ==
Grimsby Town

- National League play-off: 2016
- FA Trophy runner-up: 2015–16
