= Johnny Ertl =

Austrian footballer (born 1982)

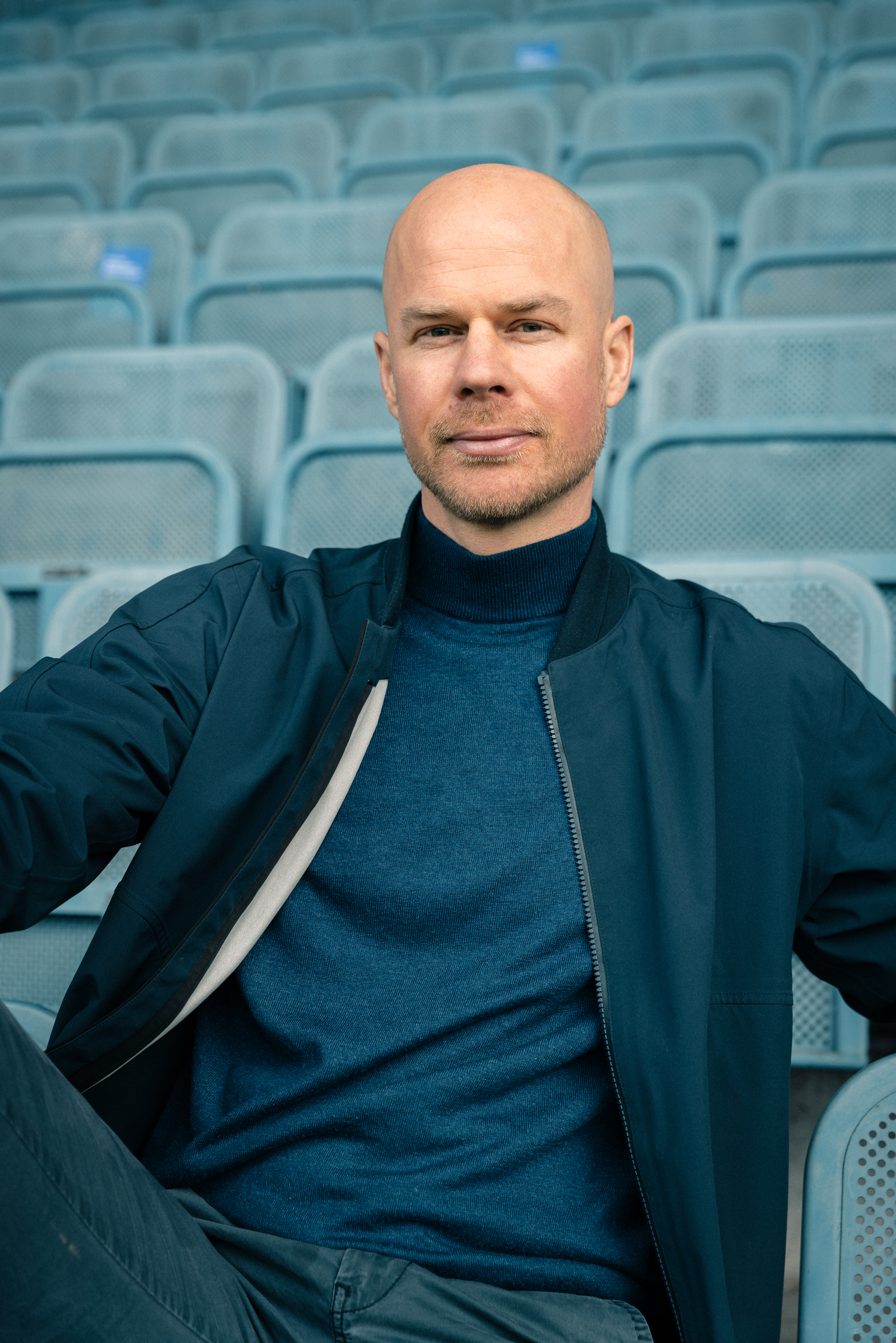

Personal information
- Full name: Johannes Bruno Ertl
- Date of birth: 13 November 1982 (age 43)
- Place of birth: Graz, Austria
- Height: 1.88 m (6 ft 2 in)
- Position: Defensive midfielder

Team information
- Current team: Portsmouth (under-16s coach)

Youth career
- SV Feldkirchen
- 1996–2003: Sturm Graz

Senior career*
Years	Team	Apps	(Gls)
2002–2006	Sturm Graz	61	(0)
2003–2004	→ SC Kalsdorf (loan)	11	(3)
2006–2008	Austria Wien	50	(3)
2008–2010	Crystal Palace	45	(0)
2010–2012	Sheffield United	35	(0)
2012–2015	Portsmouth	80	(2)
Total		282	(8)

International career
2006–2007	Austria	7	(0)
- * Club domestic league appearances and goals

Johannes Bruno Ertl (born 13 November 1982) is a former Austrian professional footballer who played as a defensive midfielder. He played for several notable football clubs during his career, including Sturm Graz, FK Austria Wien, Crystal Palace, Sheffield United, and Portsmouth FC. After retiring from professional football, Ertl became the spokesperson for the Portsmouth F.C. supporters' trust and also served as the assistant coach of the Portsmouth under-16s team.

In 2015, Ertl transitioned to a career as a television pundit. He works for ProSiebenSat.1 PULS 4 and CANAL+ where he covers various football competitions, including UEFA Champions League, UEFA Europa League, UEFA conference league, UEFA Euro 2024 Qualifier, UEFA Nations League and the German Bundesliga.

== Career ==
=== Early career ===
Ertl began his football career in the youth team of SV Feldkirchen before moving to Sturm Graz in 1996. After playing for the club's youth categories, he earned a professional contract at his hometown club in 2003. Ertl then went on loan to SC Kalsdorf in the same year and had a successful spell there.

Upon returning to Sturm Graz, Ertl earned a place in the center of defense, thanks to his impressive displays. He was eventually called up to the Austria national football team and made his debut in a match against Hungary.

=== FK Austria Wien ===
On 31 August 2006 Johannes Ertl left his hometown club SK Sturm Graz and joined FK Austria Wien, where he signed a contract that would keep him at the club until the summer of 2008. He scored his first goal for the club on 1 October 2006 during a match against GAK at the UPC-Arena in Graz.

In 2007, he became an Austrian Cup champion with Austria Wien.

=== Crystal Palace ===
In 2008, he then moved to England to join Crystal Palace FC. While playing for Palace, he scored his first goal for the team in a match against Aston Villa in the FA Cup on 14 February 2010.

=== Sheffield United ===
Ertl's contract expired at the end of the 2009–10 season, and with Palace in financial trouble, he signed for Sheffield United. Unfortunately he had swapped one relegation battle for another as The Blades struggled at the wrong end of the table. Ertl was a regular in the first team until an injury to his cruciate ligament ended his season in March 2011 and kept him out of the side for almost eight months as the team slipped into League One.

After a lengthy recovery he returned to the first team squad making four substitute appearances in December before returning to the starting eleven in an FA Cup game against Salisbury City in January 2012. After a handful more appearances Ertl was released at the end of the season when his contract expired.

=== Portsmouth FC ===
On 31 August 2012, Ertl joined Portsmouth on a short-term contract. He made his debut a day later, scoring an own goal in a 0–1 home defeat against Oldham. After playing in centre back and right back roles Ertl finally found his feet in midfield. On New Year's Day, he was handed the captain armband, with Brian Howard being sidelined by injury; after Howard's departure, he was named permanent captain. Ertl finished the 2012–13 season by receiving the fans' Player of the Season award.

On 10 June 2013, Ertl signed a three-year contract extension with Portsmouth. He scored his first goal for Portsmouth on 7 September 2013 against Cheltenham in a 2–2 away draw.

On 22 July 2015, Portsmouth terminated Ertl's contract after a three-year spell at the League Two club.

After retiring from professional football, Ertl became the spokesperson for the Portsmouth F.C. supporters' trust and also served as the assistant coach of the Portsmouth under-16s team.

== Club career statistics ==
As of 2 May 2015.

Club performance			League		Cup		League Cup		Continental		Other		Total	
Club	League	Season	Apps	Goals	Apps	Goals	Apps	Goals	Apps	Goals	Apps	Goals	Apps	Goals
Austria			League		Austrian Cup		—		Europe		Other		Total	
Sturm Graz	Bundesliga	2004–05	27	0	1	0	—		—		—		28	0
Sturm Graz	Bundesliga	2005–06	27	0	1	0	—		3	0	—		31	0
Sturm Graz	Bundesliga	2006–07	7	0	0	0	—		—		—		7	0
Austria Wien	Bundesliga	2006–07	25	1	4	0	—		6	0	—		35	1
Austria Wien	Bundesliga	2007–08	26	2	0	0	—		5	1	—		31	3
England			League		FA Cup		League Cup		Europe		Other^{1}		Total	
Crystal Palace	Championship	2008–09	12	0	0	0	1	0	—		—		13	0
Crystal Palace	Championship	2009–10	33	0	3	1	1	0	—		—		37	1
Sheffield United	Championship	2010–11	28	0	1	0	1	0	—		—		30	0
Sheffield United	League One	2011–12	7	0	1	0	0	0	—		1	0	9	0
Portsmouth	League One	2012–13	37	0	1	0	0	0	—		1	0	39	0
Portsmouth	League Two	2013–14	29	1	1	0	0	0	0	0	2	0	32	1
Portsmouth	League Two	2014–15	14	1	0	0	1	0	0	0	2	0	17	1
Career totals	Portsmouth		80	2	2	0	1	0	0	0	5	0	88	2
Career totals	Austria		112	3	6	0	—		14	1	—		132	4
Career totals	England		160	2	7	1	4	0	0	0	6	0	177	3
Career totals	Career statistics		272	5	13	1	4	0	14	1	6	0	309	7

- 1.Statistics includes FA Community Shield, Football League Trophy and Football League Playoffs.

== Honours ==
- 2006 Austrian Football Bundesliga
- 2006 Austrian Cup

=== Individual ===
Portsmouth

- Player of The Season 2012–13
