= Mario Gómez (footballer, born 1992) =

Spanish footballer

Personal information
- Full name: Mario Gómez Martín
- Date of birth: 6 October 1992 (age 34)
- Place of birth: Talavera de la Reina, Spain
- Height: 1.76 m (5 ft 9 1/2 in)
- Position: Centre back

Team information
- Current team: Talavera
- Number: 4

Youth career
- Talavera
- 2010–2011: Rayo Vallecano

Senior career*
Years	Team	Apps	(Gls)
2011–2016	Rayo Vallecano B	120	(3)
2016–2017	Gavà	30	(0)
2017–2018	Talavera	30	(1)
2018–2019	Badajoz	33	(2)
2019–2020	Mérida	25	(1)
2020–	Talavera	16	(0)
- * Club domestic league appearances and goals as of 11 April 2021

Mario Gómez Martín (born 6 October 1992) is a Spanish footballer who plays for CF Talavera de la Reina as a central defender.

== Football career ==
Born in Talavera de la Reina, Toledo, Mario finished his graduation with Rayo Vallecano's youth setup, and made his senior debuts with the reserves in the 2010–11 season, in Segunda División B.

On 15 January 2014 Mario made his first team debut, starting in a 0–1 away loss against Levante UD, for the campaign's Copa del Rey. It was his only appearance for the main squad, however.

On 4 July 2016, Mario signed for CF Gavà also in the third level.
