= Therry Racon =

French association football player (born 1984)

Personal information
- Full name: Therry Norbert Racon
- Date of birth: 1 May 1984 (age 42)
- Place of birth: Villeneuve-Saint-Georges, France
- Height: 5 ft 10 in (1.78 m)
- Position: Midfielder

Team information
- Current team: Football Club de Saint-Leu

Youth career
- Marseille

Senior career*
Years	Team	Apps	(Gls)
2002–2005	Marseille	1	(0)
2004–2005	→ Lorient (loan)	28	(3)
2005–2007	Guingamp	29	(0)
2007–2011	Charlton Athletic	100	(7)
2008	→ Brighton & Hove Albion (loan)	8	(0)
2011–2013	Millwall	1	(0)
2013	→ Portsmouth (loan)	16	(0)
2013–2014	Portsmouth	16	(0)
2014–2016	Sedan	1	(0)
2016–2018	Drouais	49	(5)
2018–2019	Racing Colombes	22	(3)
2019–	FC Saint-Leu 95		
Total		271	(18)

International career
2011	Guadeloupe	3	(0)
- * Club domestic league appearances and goals

Therry Norbert Racon (born 1 May 1984) is a French former professional footballer who played as a midfielder.

== Club career ==
=== Early career ===
Born in Villeneuve-Saint-Georges, Val-de-Marne, Racon made his professional debut with Olympique de Marseille, on 1 May 2004, against RC Lens. In 2004 summer he joined FC Lorient, in a one-year loan deal. He made his debut on 3 September, against Angers SCO; and scored his first professional goal on 22 October, against US Créteil Lusitanos. In the following season, he opted to sign a deal with En Avant Guingamp. He made his debut on 1 August 2005, against CS Sedan Ardennes.

=== Charlton Athletic ===
In August 2007, Racon joined Charlton Athletic before making his debut for the club later in the month against Stockport County.

On 20 March 2008, it was revealed that Racon had agreed to join League One club Brighton & Hove Albion on loan for the remainder of the season. He made his debut for Seagulls on 8 April, against Southend United. He then returned to Charlton after his loan spell.

Following his return to the club, he had limited chances in 2007–08 season. He scored his first goal the Addicks on 25 November 2008, against QPR. Racon also retained a place in the starting XI for the rest of 2008–09 season, as his club was relegated. In the following two seasons, he was an undisputed started with his team in League One.

=== Millwall ===
On 21 June 2011, Racon agreed a contract with Millwall, signing a two-year deal on a free transfer. He made his debut on 9 August 2011, against Plymouth. He missed the whole 2011–12 season due to an ankle injury. He only returned to action on 25 August 2012, against Sheffield Wednesday.

At the end of 2012–13 season, Racon was released.

=== Portsmouth ===
On 24 January 2013, Racon joined Portsmouth on a one-month emergency loan deal. He made his debut for the club on 9 February, against AFC Bournemouth. At the end of the season, he returned to Millwall.

On 3 October, the free agent signed a one-month contract with Pompey.

== International career ==
In March 2009, Racon participated in Guadeloupe's training camp in preparation for the Gold Cup, playing the full match in a friendly against Caen.

He made his official debut for Guadeloupe in 2011 Gold Cup, on 7 June 2011, against Panama.
