= Yassin Moutaouakil =

French footballer (born 1986)

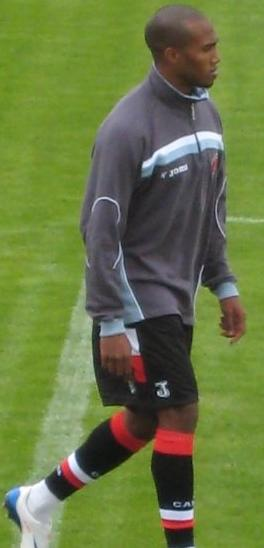
- Moutaouakil warming up for Charlton Athletic in 2008

Personal information
- Full name: Yassin Moutaouakil
- Date of birth: 18 July 1986 (age 40)
- Place of birth: Nice, France
- Height: 1.80 m (5 ft 11 in)
- Position: Right back

Senior career*
Years	Team	Apps	(Gls)
2004–2007	Châteauroux	35	(0)
2007–2010	Charlton Athletic	21	(0)
2009–2010	→ Motherwell (loan)	13	(0)
2011–2013	Hayes & Yeading United	24	(1)
2013–2014	Portsmouth	32	(0)
2016	Hayes & Yeading United	9	(0)
Total		134	(1)

International career
2007–2008	France U21	5	(0)
- * Club domestic league appearances and goals as of 15:54, 9 May 2014 (UTC)

Yassin Moutaouakil (Arabic: ياسين المتوكل; born 18 July 1986) is a former French footballer who played as a right back and has represented France at Under-19 and Under-21 levels.

== Career ==
=== Club career ===
==== Châteauroux ====
Moutaouakil was born in Nice. He began his career at Ligue 2 club Châteauroux, making his debut for the senior team in the 2004–05 season. In his time with Châteauroux, Moutaouakil made 36 appearances, including one appearance in the 2004–05 UEFA Cup.

==== Charlton Athletic ====
On 20 June 2007, he signed a four-year contract with Charlton Athletic for a fee of about €600,000, following reported interest from Everton, Aston Villa, Rangers, Celtic and Lazio. Shortly after joining Charlton, he soon suffered an ankle injury. Moutaouakil failed to settle in the side. Charlton Athletic released their season's squad numbers on 5 August, with no number being allocated to either Moutaouakil or teammate Martin Christensen.

Over the 2009 summer break, Moutaouakil joined Portsmouth on a trial basis. He played in a number of pre season friendlies but did not join permanently. Moutaouakil was also linked with a return to France by joining Le Havre on loan but that also didn't happen.

==== Motherwell (loan) ====
On the last day of the UK summer transfer window, Moutaouakil joined Motherwell on a six-month loan deal. After joining Motherwell, Moutaouakil revealed that Rangers defender Madjid Bougherra had convinced him to join a Scottish club. However, on 2 January 2010, he returned to Charlton Athletic after three-and-a-half months at Fir Park. On 4 June 2010, the club announced that Moutaouakil's contract had been mutually terminated.

==== Trials and Hayes & Yeading ====
In the summer of 2010, Moutaouakil went on trial at Swansea City. On 12 January 2011, it was announced that Yassin was on trial with Oldham Athletic.

In August 2011, Moutaouakil signed with Hayes & Yeading United in a bid to revive his career. On 17 December 2011, Moutaouakil made his club début in a 1–1 draw with Barrow. In November 2012, Moutaouakil revealed he had nearly joined Millwall in the summer transfer window In April 2012, Moutaouakil suffered an ankle injury, ruling him out for two weeks. On 20 November, he scored his first career goal, against Chelmsford City.

==== Portsmouth ====
In January 2013, he was close to joining Luton Town but signed for Portsmouth instead, on 24 January. Two days later, he made his Pompey debut, in a 1–3 home loss against Hartlepool United. On 9 May 2013, he signed a new one-year contract with Pompey following the club's relegation to League Two.

==== Return to Hayes and Yeading ====
In summer 2016, Moutaoukil re-joined Hayes and Yeading in the Southern League Premier Division.

=== International career ===
Moutaoukil was born in France and is of Moroccan descent. Moutaouakil has played for France at Under-19 and Under-21 levels. With the Under-19s, he won the 2005 UEFA European Under-19 Football Championship in July 2005. He has five Under-21 caps with France, and has also captained the side as well as playing in the 2007 Toulon Tournament.

== Career statistics ==
As of 8 November 2016

Appearances and goals by club, season and competition
Club	Season	League		National Cup		League Cup		Other		Total	
Club	Season	Apps	Goals	Apps	Goals	Apps	Goals	Apps	Goals	Apps	Goals
Châteauroux	2004–05	6	0	0	0	0	0	1	0	7	0
Châteauroux	2005–06	16	0	0	0	0	0	0	0	16	0
Châteauroux	2006–07	13	0	0	0	0	0	0	0	13	0
Châteauroux	Total	35	0	0	0	0	0	1	0	36	0
Charlton Athletic	2007–08	10	0	2	0	2	0	0	0	14	0
Charlton Athletic	2008–09	11	0	3	0	1	0	0	0	15	0
Charlton Athletic	2009–10	0	0	0	0	0	0	0	0	0	0
Charlton Athletic	Total	21	0	5	0	3	0	0	0	29	0
Motherwell (loan)	2009–10	13	0	0	0	2	0	0	0	15	0
Hayes & Yeading	2011–12	16	0	0	0	0	0	0	0	16	0
Hayes & Yeading	2012–13	8	1	0	0	0	0	1	0	9	1
Hayes & Yeading	Total	24	1	0	0	0	0	1	0	25	1
Portsmouth	2012–13	19	0	0	0	0	0	0	0	19	0
Portsmouth	2013–14	13	0	1	0	0	0	2	0	16	0
Portsmouth	Total	32	0	1	0	0	0	2	0	35	0
Hayes & Yeading	2016–17	9	0	1	0	0	0	3	0	13	0
Total		134	1	7	0	5	0	7	0	153	1
