= 2015–16 Football League Trophy =

Johnstone's Paint Trophy

Tournament details
- Country: England; Wales
- Teams: 48

Final positions
- Champions: Barnsley
- Runners-up: Oxford United

Tournament statistics
- Matches played: 49
- Goals scored: 126 (2.57 per match)
- Top goal scorer(s): (England) Lee Gregory (Millwall) (England) Jordy Hiwula (Wigan Athletic) (Jamaica) Kemar Roofe (Oxford United) (4 goals each)

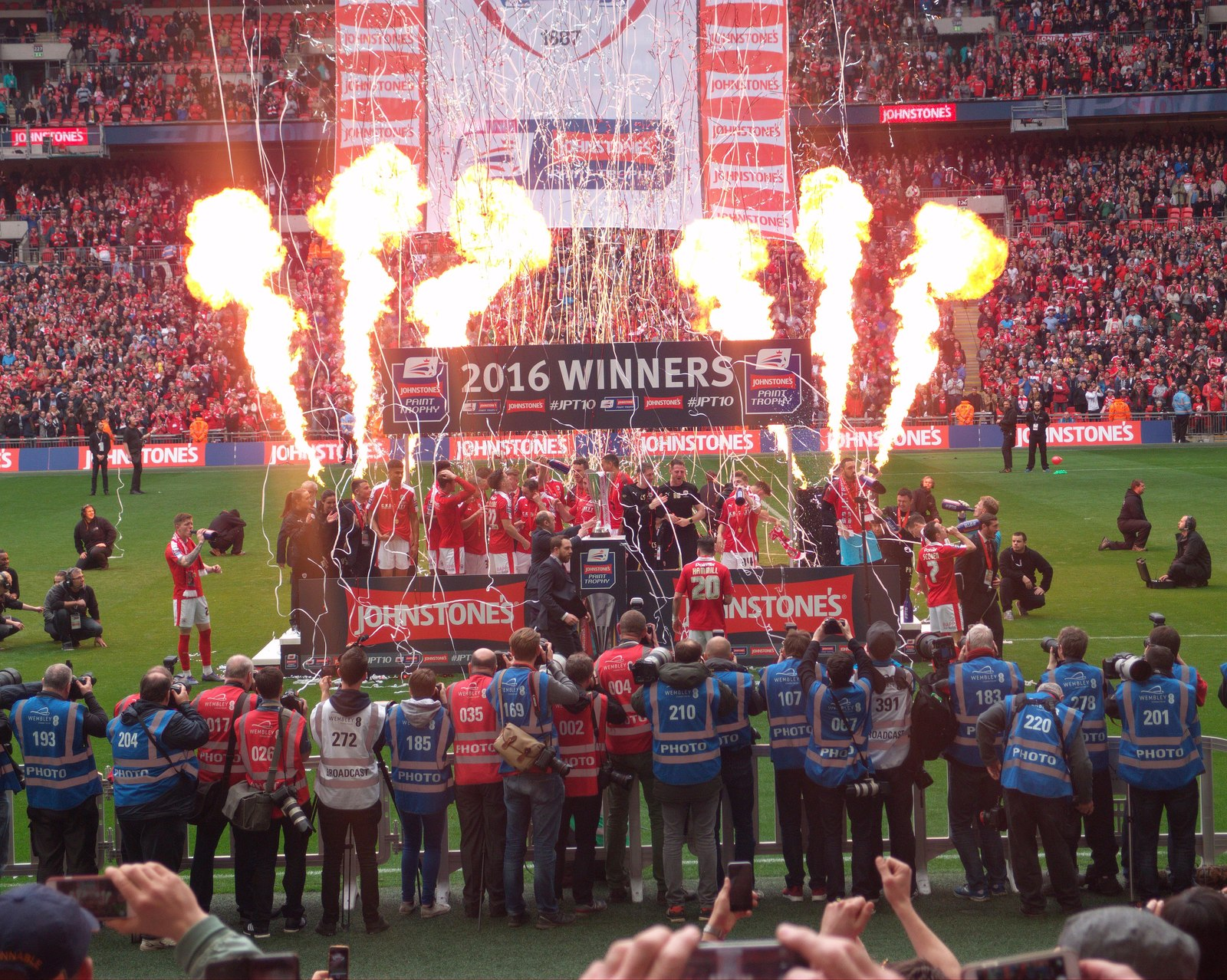
The celebrations at Wembley following Barnsley's win in the final

The 2015–16 Football League Trophy was the 35th season in the history of the competition, a knock-out tournament for English football clubs in League One and League Two, the third and fourth tiers of the English football. Barnsley of League One won the competition, defeating Oxford United of League Two 3–2 in the final. It was the last tournament to take place before the introduction of Category 1 Academy teams and an initial group stage before the knockout rounds.

In all, 48 clubs entered the competition. It was split into two sections, Northern and Southern, with the winners of each section contesting the final at Wembley Stadium. Bristol City were the reigning champions but were unable to defend their title following promotion to the Championship.

== First round ==
=== Northern section ===
==== North West ====
1 September 2015	Port Vale	1–0	Carlisle United	Vale Park, Stoke-on-Trent
19:45 GMT	Ikpeazu 60'	Report		Attendance: 2,571; Referee: Darren England

1 September 2015	Shrewsbury Town	2–0	Oldham Athletic	New Meadow, Shrewsbury
19:45 GMT	McAlinden 40'; Barnett 49'	Report		Attendance: 1,817; Referee: Steve Martin

1 September 2015	Accrington Stanley	1–2	Bury	Crown Ground, Accrington
19:45 GMT	Bruna 83'	Report	Hope 46'; Tutte 70'	Attendance: 1,344; Referee: Tony Harrington

1 September 2015	Morecambe	2–0	Walsall	Globe Arena, Morecambe
19:45 GMT	Devitt 57'; Barkhuizen 72'	Report		Attendance: 1,332; Referee: Seb Stockbridge

Byes: Blackpool, Crewe Alexandra, Fleetwood Town, Wigan Athletic

==== North East ====
1 September 2015	Hartlepool United	1–1 (3–4 p)	Sheffield United	Victoria Park, Hartlepool
19:00 GMT	Fenwick 51'	Report	Flynn 7'	Attendance: 2,221; Referee: Scott Duncan
	Penalties
	Bingham (penalty scored); Oates (penalty scored); Harrison (penalty missed); Fenwick (penalty missed); Featherstone (penalty scored)		Higdon (penalty scored); Sharp (penalty scored); McNulty (penalty scored); Woolford (penalty missed); McEveley (penalty scored)

1 September 2015	Doncaster Rovers	0–0 (5–3 p)	Burton Albion	Keepmoat Stadium, Doncaster
19:45 GMT		Report		Attendance: 2,956; Referee: Ross Joyce
	Penalties
	Williams (penalty scored); Main (penalty scored); Middleton (penalty scored); Chaplow (penalty scored); Stewart (penalty scored)		Akins (penalty scored); Reilly (penalty scored); Naylor (penalty missed); Binnom-Williams (penalty scored)

1 September 2015	Notts County	3–1	Mansfield Town	Meadow Lane, Nottingham
19:45 GMT	McLeod 52'; Edwards 79'; Jonathan Stead 90'	Report	Craig Westcarr 90' (pen.)	Attendance: 2,696; Referee: Richard Clark

1 September 2015	Scunthorpe United	1–2	Barnsley	Glanford Park, Scunthorpe
19:45 GMT	Goode 90'	Report	Nyatanga 62'; Watkins 76'	Attendance: 1,796; Referee: Ben Toner

Byes: Bradford City, Chesterfield, Rochdale, York City

=== Southern section ===
==== South West ====
1 September 2015	Yeovil Town	1–0	Barnet	Huish Park, Yeovil
19:45 BST	Dembélé 37' (o.g.)	Report		Attendance: 1,203; Referee: Tim Robinson

1 September 2015	Newport County	1–1 (6–7 p)	Swindon Town	Rodney Parade, Newport
19:45 BST	Collins 72'	Report	Rodgers 19'	Attendance: 1,434; Referee: Kevin Johnson
	Penalties
	Byrne (penalty scored); Ansah (penalty scored); Klukowski (penalty scored); Boden (penalty scored); Ofori-Twumasi (penalty scored); Owen-Evans (penalty scored); Collins (penalty missed)		Rodgers (penalty scored); Robert (penalty scored); Turnbull (penalty scored); Brophy (penalty scored); Branco (penalty scored); Barry (penalty scored); Randall (penalty scored)

1 September 2015	Exeter City	2–0	Portsmouth	St James Park, Exeter
19:45 BST	Harley 54' (pen.); Nicholls 72'	Report		Attendance: 2,323; Referee: Lee Swabey

1 September 2015	AFC Wimbledon	2–3	Plymouth Argyle	Kingsmeadow, London
19:45 BST	Azeez 7'; Taylor 25'	Report	Jervis 38'; Brunt 54'; McHugh 57'	Attendance: 1,251; Referee: Charles Breakspear

Byes: Bristol Rovers, Coventry City, Oxford United, Wycombe Wanderers

==== South East ====
1 September 2015	Luton Town	2–1	Leyton Orient	Kenilworth Road, Luton
19:45 BST	Green 29'; O'Donnell 90'	Report	James 59' (pen.)	Attendance: 1,953; Referee: Nick Kinseley

1 September 2015	Millwall	1–0	Peterborough United	The Den, London
19:45 BST	Williams 29'	Report		Attendance: 2,050; Referee: Keith Hill

1 September 2015	Northampton Town	3–2	Colchester United	Sixfields Stadium, Northampton
19:45 BST	Calvert-Lewin 9'; Watson 50'; Richards 85'	Report	Bonne 31', 82'	Attendance: 1,366; Referee: Darren Deadman

1 September 2015	Cambridge United	0–2	Dagenham & Redbridge	Abbey Stadium, Cambridge
19:45 BST		Report	Hemmings 21'; McClure 27'	Attendance: 1,618; Referee: Darren Drysdale

Byes: Crawley Town, Gillingham, Southend United, Stevenage

== Second round ==
=== Northern section ===
==== North West ====
6 October 2015	Port Vale	1–2	Blackpool	Vale Park, Stoke-on-Trent
19:45 BST	Grant 52' (pen.)	Report	Rivers 44'; Robertson 56'	Attendance: 2,720; Referee: Mark Heywood

6 October 2015	Bury	0–1	Morecambe	Gigg Lane, Bury
19:45 BST		Report	Miller 81'	Attendance: 1,508; Referee: Mark Brown

6 October 2015	Crewe Alexandra	2–3	Wigan Athletic	Gresty Road, Crewe
19:30 BST	Haber 6'; Colclough 36'	Report	Hiwula 10', 70'; Wildschut 76'	Attendance: 2,168; Referee: James Adcock

6 October 2015	Fleetwood Town	2–1	Shrewsbury Town	Highbury Stadium, Fleetwood
19:45 BST	Hunter 69'; Grant 90+1'	Report	Brown 25'	Attendance: 1,267; Referee: Kevin Wright

==== North East ====
6 October 2015	York City	2–0	Doncaster Rovers	Bootham Crescent, York
19:45 BST	Oliver 5', 50'	Report		Attendance: 1,627; Referee: Geoff Eltringham

6 October 2015	Sheffield United	5–1	Notts County	Bramall Lane, Sheffield
19:45 BST	Baxter 20' (pen.), 36' (pen.); Done 23'; Scougall 67'; Adams 74' (pen.)	Report	Stead 62'	Attendance: 5,497; Referee: Carl Boyeson

6 October 2015	Rochdale	2–1	Chesterfield	Proact Stadium, Chesterfield
19:00 BST	Tanser 18'; Alessandra 66'	Report	Eastham 65' (o.g.)	Attendance: 1,042; Referee: Jeremy Simpson

13 October 2015	Bradford City	1–2	Barnsley	Valley Parade, Bradford
19:45 BST	Knott 22'	Report	Watkins 45'; Mawson 69'	Attendance: 4,127; Referee: Trevor Kettle

=== Southern section ===
==== South West ====
6 October 2015	Yeovil Town	0–0 (4–3 p)	Coventry City	Huish Park, Yeovil
19:45 BST		Report		Attendance: 1,605; Referee: Kevin Johnson
	Penalties
	Dickson (penalty scored); Bird (penalty scored); Howells (penalty scored); Laird (penalty scored)		(penalty scored) Tudgay; (penalty missed) Elford-Alliyu; (penalty scored) Murphy; (penalty scored) G. Thomas; (penalty missed) Ricketts

6 October 2015	Plymouth Argyle	2–0	Exeter City	Home Park, Plymouth
19:45 BST	Boateng 32'; Tanner 49'	Report		Attendance: 9,441; Referee: Brendan Malone

6 October 2015	Oxford United	2–0	Swindon Town	Kassam Stadium, Oxford
19:45 BST	Roofe 41', 53'	Report		Attendance: 9,013; Referee: Gavin Ward

6 October 2015	Bristol Rovers	2–0	Wycombe Wanderers	Memorial Stadium, Bristol
19:45 BST	Taylor 4'; Easter 11'	Report		Attendance: 3,243; Referee: Oliver Langford

==== South East ====
6 October 2015	Millwall	2–0	Northampton Town	The Den, London
19:45 BST	O'Brien 71'; Gregory 75'	Report		Attendance: 2,254; Referee: Iain Williamson

6 October 2015	Crawley Town	0–3	Southend United	Broadfield Stadium, Crawley
19:45 BST		Report	Weston 26'; Pigott 39', 87'	Attendance: 1,139; Referee: Tim Robinson

6 October 2015	Gillingham	2–1	Luton Town	Priestfield Stadium, Gillingham
19:45 BST	Ehmer 65'; Dack 83'	Report	McGeehan 41'	Attendance: 3,428; Referee: Michael Bull

7 October 2015	Stevenage	1–2	Dagenham & Redbridge	Broadhall Way, Stevenage
19:45 BST	Kennedy 79' (pen.)	Report	Cureton 53'; Chambers 55'	Attendance: 1,401; Referee: James Linington

== Area quarter-finals ==
=== Northern section ===
10 November 2015	Wigan Athletic	4–0	Blackpool	DW Stadium, Wigan
19:15 GMT	Hiwula 20', 78' (pen.); Murray 63'; Wildschut 71'	Report		Attendance: 5,224; Referee: Andrew Madley

10 November 2015	Rochdale	0–1	Morecambe	Spotland Stadium, Rochdale
19:45 GMT		Report	Mullin 17'	Attendance: 1,428; Referee: David Coote

10 November 2015	Fleetwood Town	0–0 (4–1 p)	Sheffield United	Highbury Stadium, Fleetwood
19:45 GMT		Report		Attendance: 1,587; Referee: Chris Kavanagh
	Penalties
	(penalty scored) Grant; (penalty scored) Ball; (penalty scored) Ryan; (penalty scored) Haughton		(penalty scored) Baxter; (penalty missed) Sharp; (penalty missed) McEveley

10 November 2015	Barnsley	2–1	York City	Oakwell, Barnsley
19:45 GMT	Pearson 67'; Hammill 83'	Report	Coulson 40'	Attendance: 3,360; Referee: David Webb

=== Southern section ===
10 November 2015	Gillingham	1–1 (4–5 p)	Yeovil Town	Priestfield Stadium, Gillingham
19:15 BST	Garmston 43'	Report	Cornick 13'	Attendance: 1,832; Referee: Dean Whitestone
	Penalties
	(penalty scored) Dack; (penalty scored) Egan; (penalty scored) Loft; (penalty scored) Williamson; (penalty missed) Donnelly		(penalty scored) Dolan; (penalty scored) Bird; (penalty scored) Tozer; (penalty scored) Cornick; (penalty scored) Roberts

10 November 2015	Plymouth Argyle	3–5	Millwall	Home Park, Plymouth
19:45 BST	Jervis 34', 85'; Carey 56'	Report	Gregory 21', 49', 58' (pen.); Beevers 43'; O'Brien 66'	Attendance: 5,869; Referee: James Linington

11 November 2015	Southend United	1–0	Bristol Rovers	Roots Hall, Southend-on-Sea
19:45 BST	White 11'	Report		Attendance: 3,495; Referee: Andy Woolmer

11 November 2015	Dagenham & Redbridge	0–2	Oxford United	Victoria Road, London
19:45 BST		Report	Hoban 1'; MacDonald 47'	Attendance: 1,011; Referee: Andy Davies

== Area semi-finals ==
=== Northern section ===
5 December 2015	Wigan Athletic	2–2 (2–4 p)	Barnsley	DW Stadium, Wigan
15:00 GMT	Grigg 48', 82'	Report	Hammill 42'; Toney 53'	Attendance: 6,628; Referee: Keith Hill
	Penalties
	(penalty scored) Power; (penalty missed) Davies; (penalty missed) Perkins; (penalty scored) Flores		(penalty scored) Hourihane; (penalty scored) Toney; (penalty scored) Winnall; (penalty scored) Mawson

8 December 2015	Fleetwood Town	2–0	Morecambe	Highbury, Fleetwood
19:45 GMT	Ball 63'; Ryan 76'	Report		Attendance: 1,715; Referee: Paul Tierney

=== Southern section ===
8 December 2015	Oxford United	3–2	Yeovil Town	Kassam Stadium, Oxford
19:45 GMT	Evans 4'; O'Dowda 42'; Maguire 54'	Report	Fogden 37'; Jeffers 90'	Attendance: 2,532; Referee: Keith Stroud

8 December 2015	Southend United	0–2	Millwall	Roots Hall, Southend-on-Sea
19:45 GMT		Report	Morison 34'; Williams 65'	Attendance: 5,972; Referee: Simon Hooper

== Area finals ==
=== Northern section ===
9 January 2016	Barnsley	1–1	Fleetwood Town	Oakwell, Barnsley
15:00 GMT	Fletcher 73'	Report	Davies 60' (o.g.)	Attendance: 11,403; Referee: Fred Graham

4 February 2016	Fleetwood Town	1−1 (2−2 agg.) (2−4 p)	Barnsley	Highbury Stadium, Fleetwood
19:45 GMT	Hunter 81'	Report	Hourihane 67'	Attendance: 3,705; Referee: Eddie Ilderton
	Penalties
	Ball (penalty scored); Grant (penalty scored); McLaughlin (penalty missed); Bell (penalty missed)		(penalty scored) Long; (penalty scored) Hourihane; (penalty missed) Scowen; (penalty scored) Winnall; (penalty scored) Hammill

=== Southern section ===
14 January 2016	Millwall	0–2	Oxford United	The Den, London
19:45 GMT		Report	Roofe 15', 43'	Attendance: 7,275; Referee: Stuart Attwell

2 February 2016	Oxford United	0–1 (2–1 agg.)	Millwall	Kassam Stadium, Oxford
19:45 GMT		Report	Gregory 54'	Attendance: 10,138; Referee: Scott Duncan

== Final ==
3 April 2016
14:30 GMT

Barnsley	3–2	Oxford United
Dunkley 52' (o.g.); Fletcher 68'; Hammill 74'	Report	O'Dowda 29'; Hylton 76'

Wembley Stadium, London
Attendance: 59,230
Referee: Andy Woolmer
