= 2015–16 Yeovil Town F.C. season =

Yeovil Town
2015–16 season
- Chairman: John Fry
- Manager: Paul Sturrock (until 1 December); Darren Way (from 1 December)
- Stadium: Huish Park
- League Two: 19th
- FA Cup: Third round replay
- League Cup: First round
- FL Trophy: Southern Semi-finals
- Top goalscorer: League: Ryan Bird (8); All: Three players (8)
- Highest home attendance: 6,051 (20 February vs. Portsmouth, League Two)
- Lowest home attendance: 1,203 (1 September vs. Barnet, FL Trophy)
- Average home league attendance: 3,936
Home colours	Away colours

The 2015–16 season was the 13th season in the Football League played by Yeovil Town Football Club, an English football club based in Yeovil, Somerset. Their relegation from League One in the 2014–15 season meant a first season in League Two for ten years.

It was manager Paul Sturrock's first season in charge as he saw a complete overhaul of the side that had suffered back-to-back relegations, and signed nineteen players on permanent and loan contracts before the close of the summer transfer window. The season started poorly with the club suffering a series of injury crises and only winning two league matches by the end of November. With a third consecutive relegation a real possibility the club sacked Sturrock, with him being replaced in the interim by first-team coach Darren Way and after his permanent appointment in January, Yeovil's form improved including a run of four consecutive 1–0 wins in March and eight clean-sheets in nine matches. Safety was confirmed with four matches to spare as Yeovil finished the season in 19th place.

The club reached the third round of the FA Cup, for the third consecutive season for the first time in the club's history, losing in a penalty shootout to Carlisle United having beaten Maidstone United and Stevenage in the preceding rounds. Yeovil were eliminated in the first round of the League Cup losing at home to Queens Park Rangers and reached the Southern Area Semi-finals of the Football League Trophy, losing to Oxford United, having defeated Barnet, Coventry City and Gillingham. There was a three-way tie for top goalscorer with Ryan Bird, Harry Cornick and François Zoko each scoring 8 goals.

== Background ==
The 2014–15 season saw Yeovil compete in the third tier of English football following their immediate relegation from the Championship. The season started poorly with two consecutive league defeats and despite a brief improvement in form in late August and September, Yeovil remained in the relegation zone from October until the end of the season. The club's poor form led to the departure of manager Gary Johnson in February, but his replacement Terry Skiverton could not arrest the Glovers plight and after six consecutive league defeats was replaced by Paul Sturrock. His first match in charge saw Yeovil's back-to-back relegation to League Two confirmed. The club finished bottom of the league twelve points from safety. Despite relegation in the league Yeovil reached the third round of the FA Cup and faced Premier League side Manchester United for the first time since 1949.

The end of the season saw new manager Paul Sturrock perform a major clear out of the Yeovil squad, with eleven players released including Fergus Bell, Liam Davis, Craig Eastmond, Joel Grant, James Hayter, Sam Hoskins, Kieffer Moore, Nathan Ralph, Alex Smith, Seth Nana Twumasi and Gozie Ugwu, while club captain Joe Edwards and midfielder Sam Foley both rejected offers of new contracts. A further four players were offered deals to terminate their contracts early with both James Berrett and Adam Morgan agreeing to leave the club in the close season. Finally midfielder Kevin Dawson signed a new two-year contract with the club.

== Review ==
=== Pre-season ===
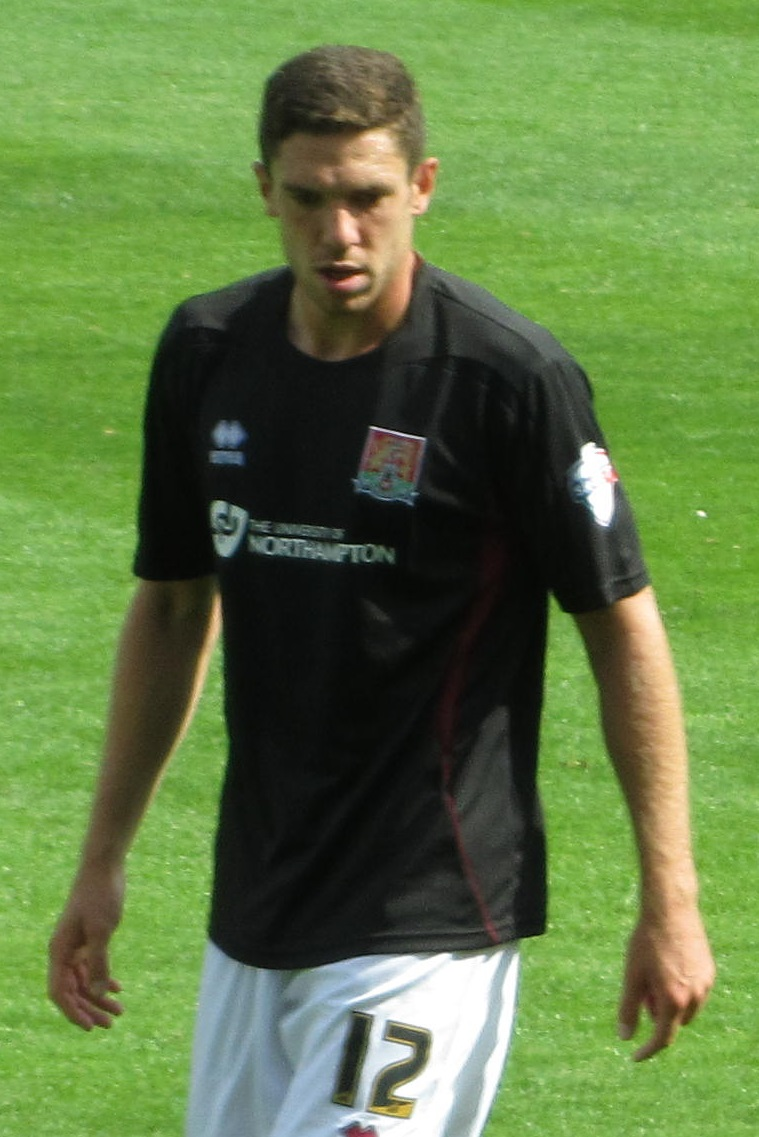
Ben Tozer signed after his release from Northampton Town.

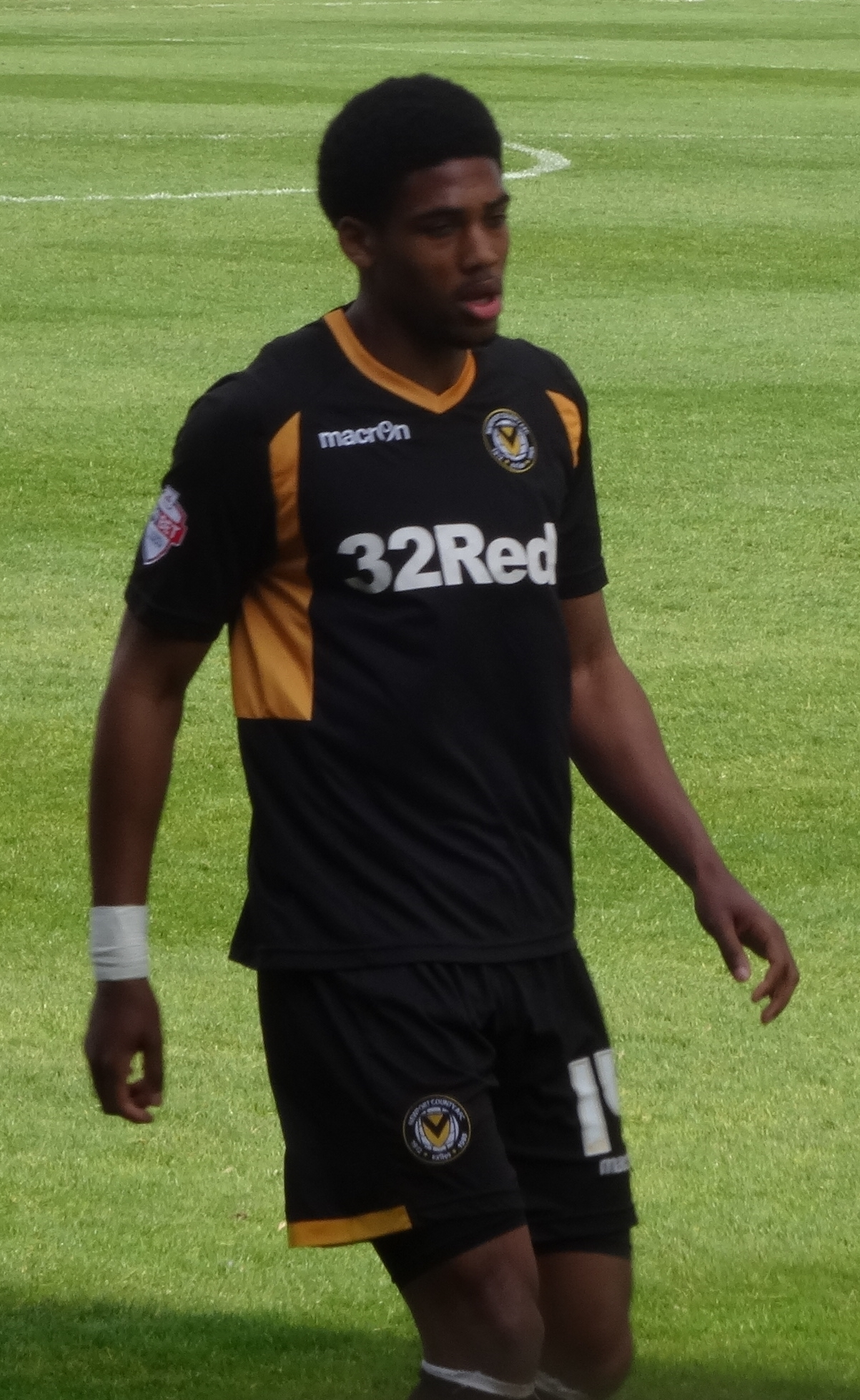
Forward Shaun Jeffers joined the club signing on a one-year contract.

The squad returned for pre-season training on 3 July. The first day of pre-season saw the arrival of ten new signings, full-back Ben Tozer joined on a one-year deal following his release from Northampton Town, while midfielder and former loanee Matthew Dolan signed a two-year contract after his release from Bradford City. Winger Jack Compton signed a one-year contract having been released from Hartlepool United and forward Jamie Burrows joined from Rangers also on a one-year deal. Fulham defender Stephen Arthurworrey returned to the club on loan until the end of the season. Midfielder Marc Laird joined from Tranmere Rovers on a one-year contract having rejected the offer of a new deal from Tranmere Rovers. Another former loanee Ryan Dickson signed from Crawley Town, where he had been the club's player of the season, for a nominal fee on a two-year contract. Three further players signed one-year contracts having impressed manager Paul Sturrock during an end of season trial match, these included former Ipswich Town defender Omar Sowunmi, ex-Queens Park Rangers midfielder Jordan Gibbons, and former Newport County forward Shaun Jeffers. Finally goalkeepers Chris Weale and Artur Krysiak both decided to remain at the club, the former becoming player-goalkeeper coach and the latter being removed from the transfer-list. On 14 July, Yeovil confirmed the signing of former Cambridge United striker Ryan Bird on a two-year contract. Yeovil's twelfth summer signing came in the form of former Portsmouth midfielder Wes Fogden who signed a two-year deal prior to the club's first pre-season friendly against Truro City on 17 July.

Yeovil's first friendly of the season against Truro City saw the club name five trialists who included former Plymouth Argyle right-back Paul Connolly, former Cheltenham Town winger Ashley Vincent and former Barnet winger Iffy Allen. The Glovers won the match 1–0 courtesy of a late Marc Laird goal. After their victory over Truro City, Yeovil's tour of Cornwall concluded with a visit to Callington Town on 19 July, the club won the match 4–0 with Ryan Bird scoring a brace and Shaun Jeffers and Stephen Arthurworrey scoring one apiece. On 20 July, striker A-Jay Leitch-Smith finally left the club agreeing to terminate his two-year contract a season early to join League One side Port Vale. The 22 July, saw Yeovil confirm their thirteenth signing of the summer in the form of Luton Town defender Alex Lacey on a free transfer, with the defender signing a two-year contract with the Glovers. That evening Yeovil traveled to Torquay United for their third pre-season friendly after falling behind to their National League opponents the Glovers won the match 2–1 with goals from Shaun Jeffers and Matthew Dolan. On 24 July, Yeovil signed Carlisle United striker Mark Beck, their fourteenth summer signing, the tall Scot signing a two-year contract for an undisclosed fee. New signing Ryan Dickson was confirmed as the club's new captain, on 27 July, for the 2015–16 season with fellow left-back Nathan Smith becoming the team's vice-captain.

Ahead of the club's first home pre-season friendly, on 28 July, the club confirmed a further signing with trialist Iffy Allen signing a one-year contract. Yeovil's unbeaten pre-season came to an end with a 3–0 defeat against newly promoted Premier League side A.F.C. Bournemouth in front of an impressive crowd of 2,422. Yeovil's second home pre-season friendly saw them face Bristol City with a side featuring two new trialists in the form of former Peterborough United defender/midfielder Kane Ferdinand and Luton Town midfielder Andy Parry. The club beat their Championship opponents 1–0 with an injury time winner scored by youth team midfielder Max Melanson. Yeovil's pre-season concluded with a 3–2 victory over a Swansea City XI, consisting mostly of their U21 side, on 4 August 2015. The Yeovil team included four new trialists, including former Port Vale winger Jennison Myrie-Williams, Guyanese international Brandon Beresford, Crystal Palace academy midfielder Sonny Black and Shaun Keith. On 7 August, Yeovil completed the signing of Bournemouth winger Harry Cornick on a one-month loan deal.

Pre-season match details
Date	Opponents	Venue	Result	Score F–A	Scorers	Attendance	Ref
17 July 2015	Truro City	A	W	1–0	Laird	286	
19 July 2015	Callington Town	A	W	4–0	Jeffers (2), Arthurworrey, Bird	253	
22 July 2015	Torquay United	A	W	2–1	Jeffers, Dolan	823	
28 July 2015	Bournemouth	H	L	0–3		2,422	
30 July 2015	Bristol City	H	W	1–0	Melanson	1,490	
4 August 2015	Swansea City U21s	H	W	3–2	Lacey, Bird, Beresford	624	

=== August ===
Yeovil's League Two season started with an away fixture against Exeter City, on 8 August, a match which coincided the fifth anniversary of the death of striker Adam Stansfield. Prior to the match the club signed Swansea City right back Connor Roberts on a one-month loan deal. Yeovil started the game poorly falling 2–0 behind at half time, but a goal 23 seconds into the second half through substitute Harry Cornick and a penalty from Matthew Dolan levelled the scores but the team eventually succumbed to a 3–2 defeat. On 11 August, Yeovil faced Queens Park Rangers at home in the first round of the League Cup, Yeovil though were outclassed with their Championship opponents running out 3–0 winners. Yeovil's first home league match of the season saw them face local rivals Bristol Rovers, on 15 August, a late Ellis Harrison goal saw Yeovil fall to a 1–0 defeat. On 18 August, ahead of the club's trip to York City, Yeovil signed Bournemouth midfielder Josh Wakefield on a one-month loan deal. The game itself was a poor one with Yeovil losing their third consecutive league match thanks to a goal from former Yeovil midfielder James Berrett. On 21 August, Paul Sturrock made his fifteenth signing of the summer with experienced midfielder David Norris joining on non-contract terms. On 22 August, Yeovil recorded their first win of the season after battling back from two goals down to beat Luton Town 3–2, with a goal from Fulham loanee Stephen Arthurworrey just before halftime and a brace from Ryan Bird in the second half helping Yeovil climb to nineteenth in the league. The result was the first time in ten years that the Glovers had come from two goals down to win a league match, and the first time since December 1999 at Huish Park. On 29 August, Yeovil traveled to unbeaten Oxford United and ended August with a 2–0 defeat.

=== September ===
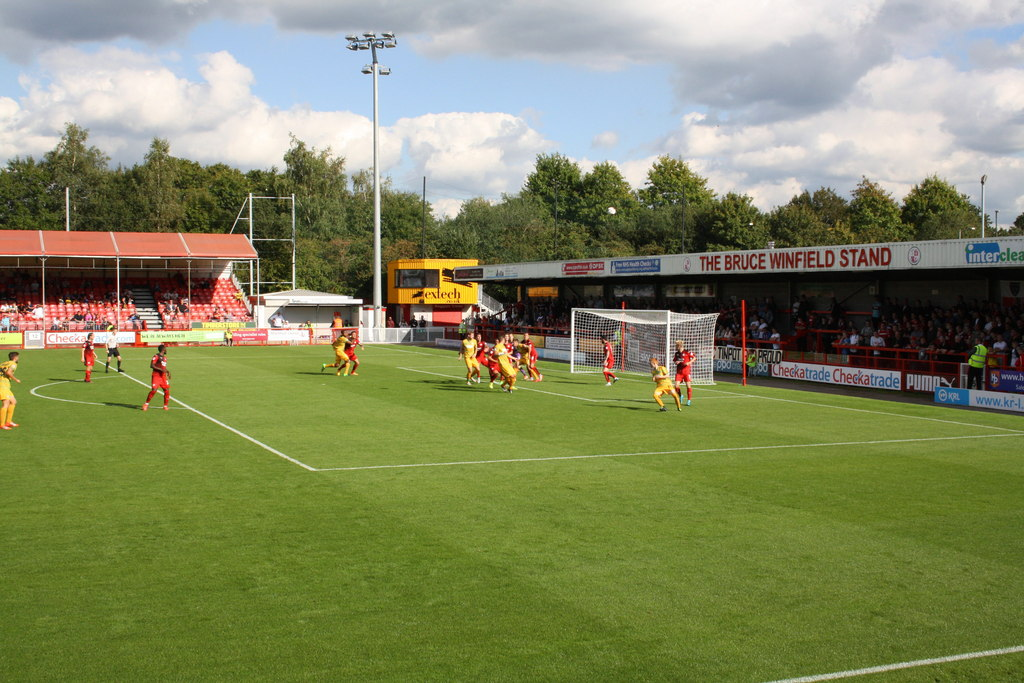
A Harry Cornick strike gave Yeovil their first away victory over the season against Crawley Town.

The 1 September saw Yeovil face Barnet in the first round of the Football League Trophy southern section at Huish Park, a dull game with just a single shot on target between the two sides was won courtesy of an own goal from Barnet defender Bira Dembélé as Yeovil progressed to face Coventry City in the second round. After the match manager Paul Sturrock revealed that midfielder David Norris had left the club after just one substitute appearance. On 5 September, Yeovil faced Morecambe and at half time led 2–0 thanks to goals from Harry Cornick and Omar Sowunmi either side of striker Shaun Jeffers being dismissed, 10-man Yeovil capitulated in the second half conceding four times to lose 4–2. After the match the loans of both Cornick and Connor Roberts were extended for a further month, while on 11 September, winger Jake Howells signed on a month's loan from Luton Town. On 12 September, Yeovil drew 1–1 at home with AFC Wimbledon, in the first meeting between the two sides Yeovil took the lead through Ryan Bird before former trialist Adebayo Akinfenwa equalised for the Dons with 11 minutes remaining. Prior to the trip to Crawley Town on 19 September, manager Paul Sturrock confirmed that youth team player Ollie Bassett would be making his first team debut, the attacking midfielder broke Steven Caulker's record as Yeovil's youngest ever player in the Football League by just 26 days and also the first youth team player to make his debut for Yeovil since Craig Alcock in May 2007. With the squad stretched due to injuries, Yeovil only named five substitutes one of whom was fellow youth team midfielder Max Melanson, despite this Yeovil recorded their first away win of the season courtesy of a 25-yard strike from Harry Cornick. During the week, Bournemouth midfielder Josh Wakefield returned to his parent club after the completion of his loan spell, and in his place Yeovil re-signed Swansea City player Josh Sheehan on loan until 28 December following a spell on loan at the end of the 2014–15 season. He made his second debut for the club on 26 September, in Yeovil's 2–1 home defeat to Hartlepool United, with Yeovil's goal coming courtesy of Ryan Bird's fourth of the season. On 29 September, Yeovil traveled to Accrington Stanley and despite a long range strike from loanee Josh Sheehan, Yeovil suffered another 2–1 defeat. Yeovil ended the month with a first round tie in the Somerset Premier Cup, with a team entirely made up of the club's youth team winning 3–2 away at Southern Premier League side Paulton Rovers.

=== October ===
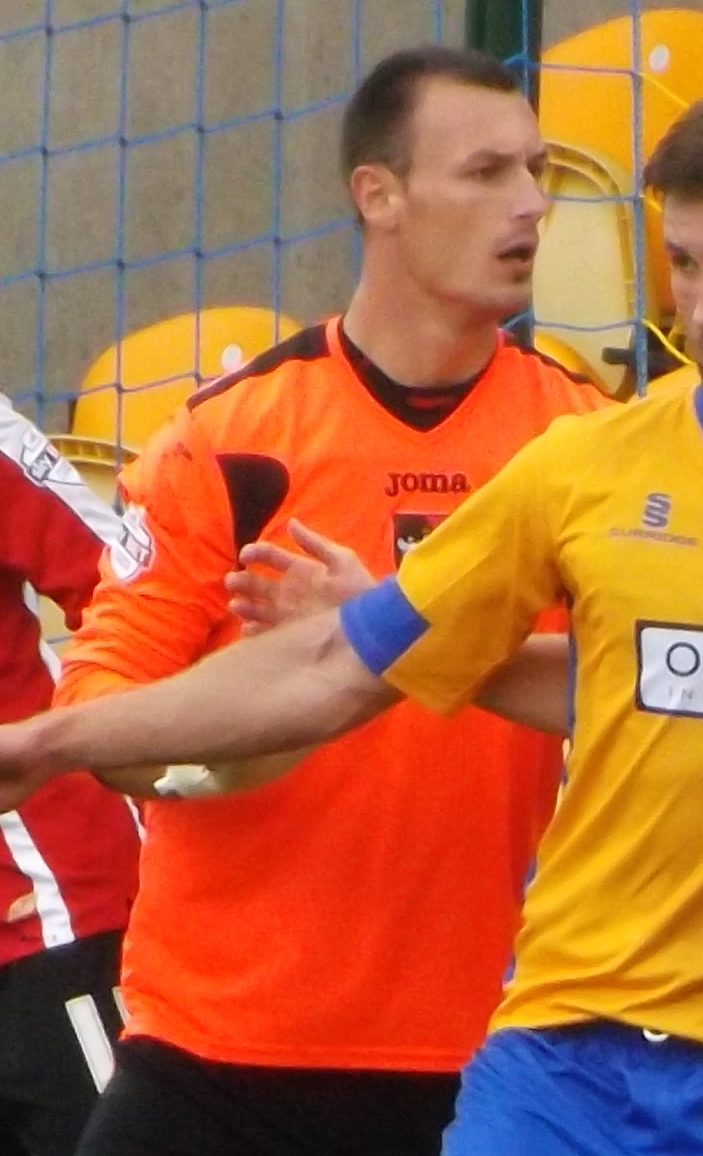
Artur Krysiak saved two penalties in Yeovil's penalty shoot-out victory over Coventry City.

Yeovil's first match of October saw them face high-flying Portsmouth, the game was uneventful as Yeovil held their opponents to a creditable goalless draw. On 6 October, Yeovil faced League One opposition in the shape of Coventry City in the second round of the Football League Trophy, a second consecutive goalless draw saw the match be decided with a penalty shoot-out. Yeovil scored all four of their kicks, while keeper Artur Krysiak saved two of Coventry's to guide the Glovers through to the southern area quarter-final stage. Before the match the club had confirmed the extension of Bournemouth loanee Harry Cornick's loan for a further month. Yeovil's next game saw them play fellow struggles Dagenham & Redbridge, despite being two-nil down after 65 minutes the Glovers battled back to salvage a point with goals from top goalscorer Ryan Bird and a first for the club from defender Jakub Sokolík. After the match the club confirmed that left midfielder Jake Howells had returned to parent club Luton Town at the end of his loan spell, while Connor Roberts extended his loan spell from Swansea City for a further month. Yeovil lost two matches in four days, first 2–0 away at Notts County, and then 1–0 at home to Mansfield Town after conceding in the tenth minute of injury time as Yeovil slipped into the relegation zone. On 24 October, the club confirmed that striker Jamie Burrows had requested the cancellation of his contract having struggled with injury following his summer move from Rangers, while also announcing the signing of Coventry City attack-minded midfielder George Thomas on a one-month loan deal. Later that afternoon, Thomas made his debut against Cambridge United but a disastrous first half saw Yeovil trail 3–0 after just 35 minutes, goals from Ryan Bird and Josh Sheehan saw Yeovil rally but to no avail. After suffering a serious knee injury in the defeat to Cambridge, loanee centre-back Stephen Arthurworrey returned to Fulham early. Yeovil's final game of October, saw the Glovers travel to Carlisle United. The team started well unlike the week before against Cambridge leading 2–0 after only eight minutes with goals from Ryan Bird, his seventh of the season, and Harry Cornick despite this a second half collapse consigned Yeovil to a second consecutive 3–2 defeat and saw them drop to the bottom of the league table.

=== November ===
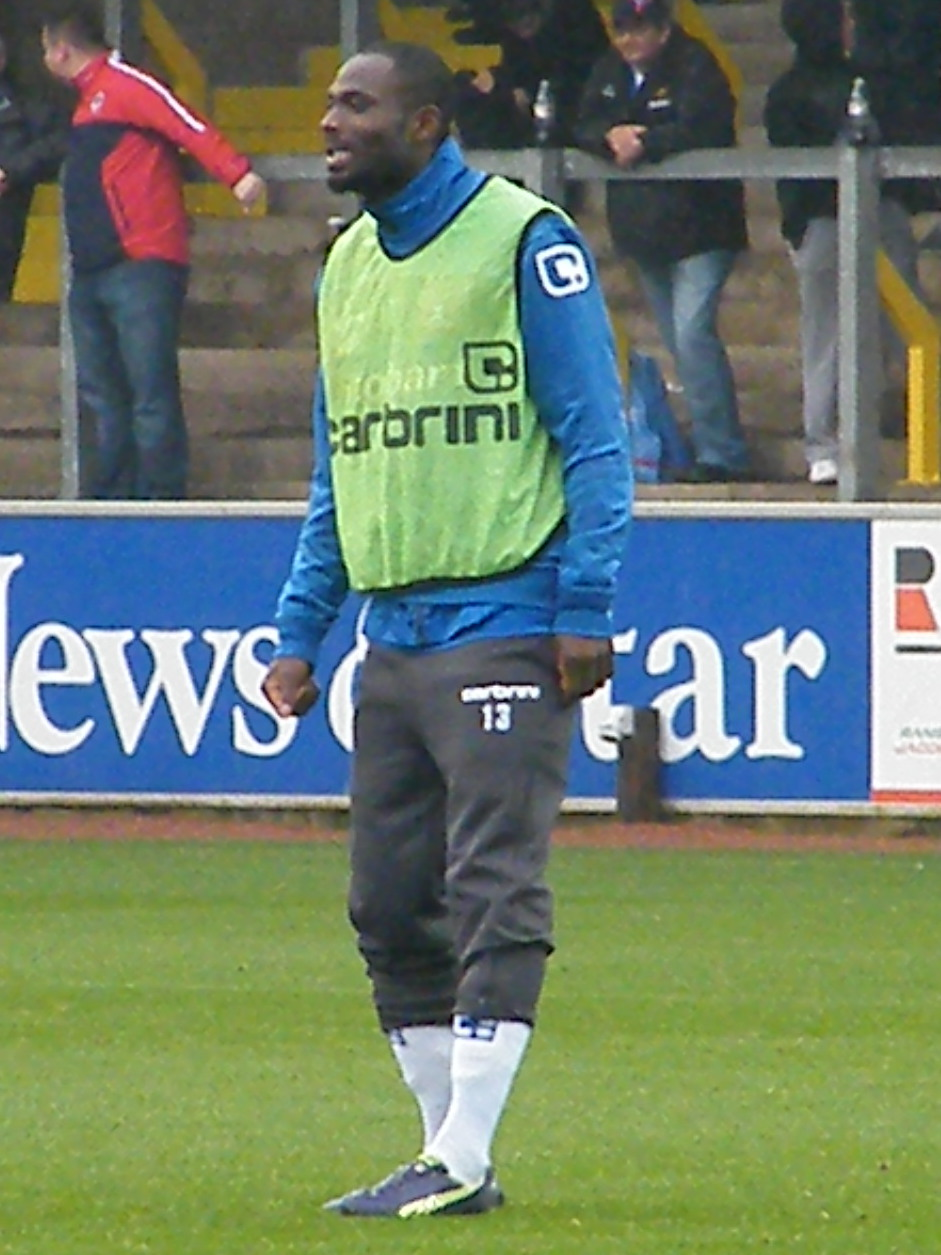
Ivorian striker François Zoko joined the club, initially on a short-term contract.

The month started with the Yeovil U18 side featuring in the FA Youth Cup for the first time in three years, on 3 November, the youth side faced Forest Green Rovers in the first round. The young Glovers won the match 4–0 to set up a second round tie with the Metropolitan Police. Ahead of their FA Cup first round tie away at National League South side Maidstone United, manager Paul Sturrock signed up veteran defender Darren Ward on short-term deal until January. Nine-man Yeovil progressed past their Conference South opponents thanks to a goal from Wes Fogden, despite the dismissals of both defender Jakub Sokolík after just seven minutes and goalkeeper Artur Krysiak with more than half an hour to go. Two days later, Yeovil traveled to Kent once more this time to face League One side Gillingham in the southern area quarter-final of the Football League Trophy, with the suspension of Artur Krysiak youth team goalkeeper James Needle featured on the bench for the first time. Yeovil took the lead against their higher ranked opponents through Harry Cornick but were pegged back through a Bradley Garmston goal just before half-time, the game went to a penalty shoot-out with Gillingham missing their fourth kick while Yeovil once again scored all of their penalties with right-back Connor Roberts converting the winning penalty. After scoring in Yeovil's trophy success Cornick extended his loan from Bournemouth for a further month until 9 December. The same evening the Yeovil reserves side, entirely made up of academy players, exited the Somerset Premier Cup at the second round stage losing 4–1 to Odd Down. On 14 November, Yeovil faced Stevenage and despite leading twice through goals from Harry Cornick and Shaun Jeffers they were twice pegged back and a late equaliser meant the game finished 2–2. After the match, the club confirmed the extension of Connor Roberts loan from Swansea City for a further month until 16 December. On 18 December, the Yeovil U18 were knocked out of the second round of the FA Youth Cup at the hands of the Metropolitan Police, following a 1–1 draw after extra time the match went to a penalty shoot-out with the young Glovers losing 7–6 after a total of eighteen penalties. Ahead of Yeovil's trip to Newport County, the club signed Ivory Coast striker François Zoko on a short-term contract until 20 January. Zoko went straight into the Yeovil starting line-up for the match but couldn't arrest the club's form as they played out a goalless draw with Newport. Yeovil dropped to the bottom of the Football League once more after losing 1–0 at home to Wycombe Wanderers on 24 November. Loan transfer deadline day, on 26 November, the club announced the extension of George Thomas's loan from Coventry City until 3 January, while also signing young Tottenham Hotspur centre-back Christian Maghoma on loan until 2 January. Yeovil ended the month with a 2–0 defeat away at Northampton Town, on 28 November.

=== December ===
The Northampton defeat turned out to be the last match for manager Paul Sturrock, who Yeovil parted company with on 1 December after a run of twelve league games without a victory. Sturrock was replaced by former Glovers midfielder Darren Way who was installed as interim manager by Chairman John Fry with former manager Terry Skiverton remaining as his assistant. Way's first move as manager was to offer a professional contract to youth team player Ollie Bassett, the young midfielder signing a contract until June 2017. Yeovil's first match under the stewardship of Darren Way was an FA Cup second round tie at home against Stevenage, on 5 December, a late strike from Ben Tozer helped Way earn a victory in his first game in temporary charge and guide Yeovil through to the third round of the FA Cup for the third successive season. Prior to the match Way had replaced Ryan Dickson as club captain with experienced defender Darren Ward being made captain. In the FA Cup third round, Yeovil were drawn away at fellow League Two side Carlisle United but due to the flood damage at their Brunton Park home caused by Storm Desmond the fixture was moved to Bloomfield Road the home of Blackpool. On 8 December, Yeovil faced Oxford United in the southern area semi-final of the Football League Trophy but were knocked out at the semi-final stage. Goals from Wes Fogden and Shaun Jeffers weren't enough as the Glovers lost 3–2. On 11 December, Yeovil confirmed that Coventry City midfielder George Thomas had returned to his parent club having only made five appearances for the Glovers, while the loan of Harry Cornick from Bournemouth was once again was extended this time until 11 January. In Way's first league match in charge, on 12 December, Yeovil scored twice in the last ten minutes courtesy of a brace from François Zoko to salvage a 2–2 draw against fellow strugglers Barnet. On 19 December, Yeovil traveled to Leyton Orient where Zoko scored his third goal in two matches to give Yeovil the lead on the stroke of half time but a 30-yard strike from Jobi McAnuff denied the Glovers victory. After the match, the club confirmed that the loans of Swansea City defender Connor Roberts and midfielder Josh Sheehan had both been extended until mid January. It was also confirmed that former Yeovil forward Chris Giles had returned to the club as acting first team coach. On Boxing Day, Yeovil traveled to top of the table Plymouth Argyle but came away empty handed losing 1–0 to the Devon side. Yeovil's tough Christmas fixtures continued with a home match against second placed Oxford United, on 28 December. Despite holding the promotion chasing side to a goalless draw, Yeovil dropped to the foot of the league table to end 2015. On 31 December, the club confirmed that interim boss Darren Way had been handed the role on a more permanent basis, but chairman John Fry didn't confirm the length of his contract.

=== January ===
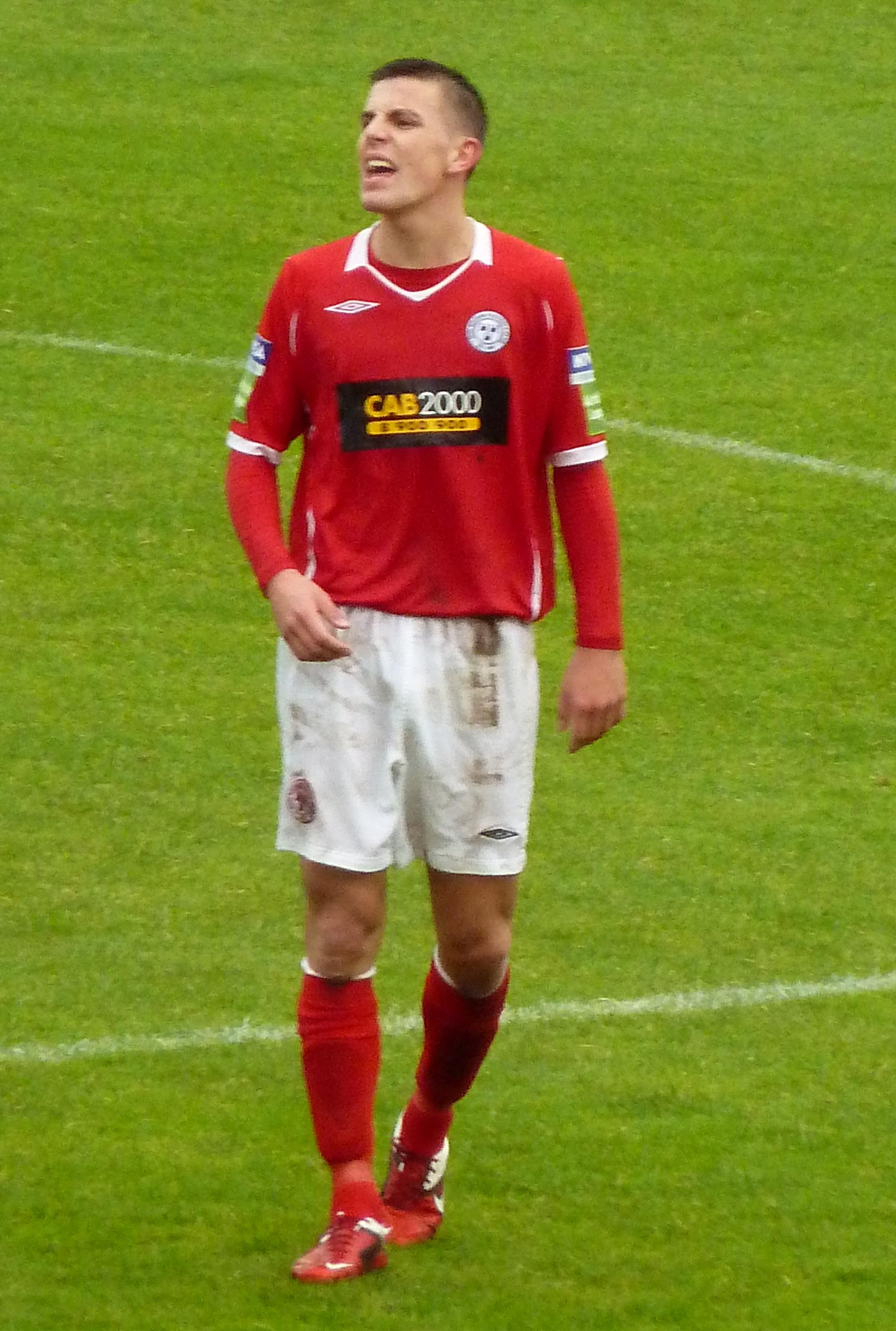
Kevin Dawson returned to action after more than a year out with injury.

The opening of the January transfer window, saw Yeovil sign West Bromwich Albion forward Tahvon Campbell on a one-month loan deal, while captain Darren Ward signed a contract extension until June 2017. Yeovil started the new year with a relegation six-pointer at home against third from bottom York City. A first-half penalty from Matthew Dolan earned Yeovil a first league win in seventeen matches. After the match manager Darren Way continued to reshape his squad with Tottenham defender Christian Maghoma returning to Spurs having not made an appearance during his loan spells, while Swansea City midfielder Josh Sheehan's loan spell was cut short. Right back Connor Roberts extended his loan until the end of the season having been an ever-present in the side until that point, while Way signed young Everton midfielder Liam Walsh on a one-month loan deal. On 10 January, Yeovil traveled to Bloomfield Road to play Carlisle United in the FA Cup third round after falling behind twice but goals from François Zoko and Shaun Jeffers secured a replay. The winners of the replay were given a potential televised home match against Premier League side Everton in the FA Cup fourth round. On 16 January, Yeovil faced Morecambe. Yeovil had an early chance to take the lead but midfielder Matthew Dolan saw an eighth-minute penalty saved by keeper Barry Roche, despite the miss the Glovers took the lead through captain Darren Ward's first goal for the club, but the lead only lasted five minutes as Yeovil lost the match 2–1. Yeovil's next match saw them face Carlisle United in their third round replay, a match deemed to be worth over £200,000 to the winner. Yeovil took the lead in the first half through Jack Compton's first goal of the club before Antony Sweeney headed in a late equaliser. Following that equaliser a brawl broke out between the two sets of players but despite Carlisle striker Jabo Ibehre "clotheslining" Yeovil keeper Artur Krysiak, the striker escaped with just a yellow card. With the game deep into injury time in the second half Yeovil earned a penalty but striker François Zoko missed to send the game into extra time, the 30 minutes of extra time saw no further goals but two red cards with defender Alex Lacey receiving a red card for a studs-up tackle while Carlisle's Luke Joyce was dismissed for a second bookable offence. The game finished 1–1 after extra time and went to a penalty shoot-out, after eight successful kicks Matthew Dolan saw his penalty saved, for the second match in a row, to allow Mark Ellis to score to send Carlisle through to play Everton in the fourth round. After the game, the club confirmed that Ivorian striker Zoko had signed a new contract until the end of the season. On 23 January, Yeovil faced Crawley Town and thanks to goals from substitutes Tahvon Campbell and Ryan Bird won 2–1 to record their second consecutive home victory. The following week, striker Mark Beck departed the club on loan to National League side Wrexham until the end of the season, Bournemouth winger Harry Cornick having recovered from his injury rejoined the club on an initial one-month loan deal and West Brom loanee Tahvon Campbell extended his loan until 3 March. Yeovil ended the month with a trip to AFC Wimbledon and despite falling behind twice in the first half a hat-trick from winger Jack Compton earned Yeovil a 3–2 victory. The hat-trick was the first by a Yeovil player since Shaun MacDonald in March 2011, while the game also featured the return of Simon Gillett after more than year out through injury. Having overseen an upturn in Yeovil's fortunes in the month of January, with three victories, two draws and a defeat manager Darren Way was nominated for the Football League Two Manager of the Month award, but was beaten by eventual winner Chris Wilder.

=== February ===
Transfer deadline day was quiet for Yeovil with only two late departures, winger Iffy Allen left to join Torquay United, while striker Shaun Jeffers left for Woking on a 28-day loan deal. A first goal for the club from Everton loanee Liam Walsh earned Yeovil a 1–1 draw away at Luton Town, on 2 February. After a hearing on 5 February, the Football Association fined both Yeovil and Carlisle United for failing to 'ensure their players conducted themselves in an orderly fashion', after a brawl during their FA Cup replay in January. Yeovil's next match against Plymouth Argyle was postponed because of a waterlogged pitch. On 8 February, Liam Walsh's loan from Everton was extended for a further month. On 13 February, Yeovil traveled to relegation rivals Hartlepool United, but lost the match 2–1 with a consolation goal coming in second half injury time from François Zoko. The game also saw defender Nathan Smith receive his first red card in professional football, after he was adjudged to have shoved Billy Paynter. The following week saw Yeovil extend the loan of winger Harry Cornick from Bournemouth until 14 March, while fellow Bournemouth under-21 striker Brandon Goodship joined the club on a month's loan. Having returned to the relegation zone, Yeovil faced play-off chasing Portsmouth at home, and took the lead through Zoko's sixth goal since his arrival in November but despite Portsmouth being reduced to ten men the south coast side fought back to earn a 1–1 draw leaving the club still in the relegation places. On 23 February, Yeovil played second place Plymouth Argyle, in their rearranged fixture, and earned a 0–0 draw to leave relegation zone on goal difference. Yeovil ended the month with a crucial 1–0 away victory over bottom placed side Dagenham & Redbridge, with Goodship scoring his first professional goal as Yeovil extended their unbeaten run to three matches.

=== March ===
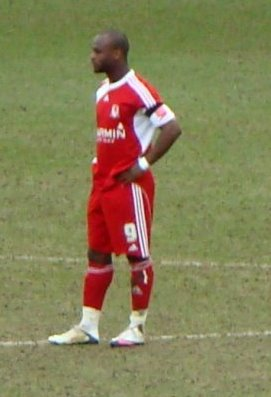
Former England U21 striker Leroy Lita signed until the end of the season.

Yeovil began March with a visit of Accrington Stanley to Huish Park. Before the match manager Darren Way confirmed that midfielder Wes Fogden, who hadn't featured for the club since early December, had suffered a serious knee injury that would rule him out for the remainder of the season. Yeovil beat fourth placed Accrington courtesy of a goal from left back Ryan Dickson, his first of the season, to move six points clear of the relegation zone. Before the Glovers trip to Mansfield Town, Yeovil extended the loan of Tahvon Campbell from West Bromwich Albion for a further month, midfielder Liam Walsh from Everton until 5 April. While Simon Gillett left the club in search of first-team football joining League One side Peterborough United on loan for a month. On the day of the match the club confirmed the signing of former England under-21 striker Leroy Lita on a short-term contract until the end of the season. Ryan Dickson scored his second winner in the space of five days with a stoppage-time goal at Mansfield to give Yeovil a third consecutive 1–0 victory. On 12 March, Yeovil extended their unbeaten run to six matches, with a fourth consecutive 1–0 victory and a fifth clean sheet in a row, after a François Zoko goal earned victory over Notts County. With Leroy Lita making his debut as a substitute and missing a penalty with his first touch. Yeovil's winning run came to an end as the club suffered a 3–0 defeat away at Cambridge United, with Everton loanee Liam Walsh being sent off for violent conduct, the club's seventh red card of the season. On 21 March, right-back Connor Roberts received a call-up to the Wales under-21 side meaning his ever-present run in the Yeovil side came to an end. Prior to Yeovil's match with Carlisle United, Bournemouth striker Brandon Goodship extended his loan until the end of the season, while Welsh defender Liam Shephard joined on a one-month loan deal from Swansea City. His debut though was delayed after the early closure of FIFA's headquarters in Switzerland meant his international clearance failed to come through in time for the visit of Carlisle. The match ended 0–0. On 31 March, forward Tahvon Campbell extended his loan from West Brom until the end of the season. Yeovil's form in the month of March, saw manager Darren Way receive his second manager of the month nomination in three months, after amassing ten points from their five games and keeping four clean sheets in the process, but was beaten by eventual winner Darrell Clarke.

=== April and May ===
Yeovil opened the month of April, with a 1–0 victory over Newport County thanks to a penalty scored by Jack Compton. Prior to the 2016 Football League Trophy Final, it was announced that Glovers defender Nathan Smith had been named in the team of the tournament. On 4 April, Peterborough United announced the extension of Simon Gillett's loan until the end of the season. The next day, Yeovil traveled to Stevenage as goalkeeper Artur Krysiak earned his eighth clean sheet in nine matches in a 0–0 draw. Having guided Yeovil to the brink of safety fourteen points clear of the relegation zone, manager Darren Way was awarded a new three-year contract. Yeovil's four month unbeaten home record came to an end with a 2–0 defeat against Exeter City. Following the match, the Football League announced that Yeovil fan Pat Custard had been nominated for the Supporter of the Year award. On 14 April, Everton midfielder Liam Walsh extended his loan until the end of the season. The club also announced that they had suffered a loss of £692,000 for the year ending June 2015, with chairman John Fry blaming the losses on the "true cost of [the club's] relegation from the Championship". On 16 April, despite losing 2–1 away at Bristol Rovers with Leroy Lita scoring the Yeovil goal, Yeovil confirmed their League Two status with four matches to spare as other results went their way. Before Yeovil's next match against Wycombe Wanderers, Way confirmed that defender Jakub Sokolík was to have surgery on a long-standing wrist problem. Yeovil drew 0–0 with play-off chasing Wycombe. On 23 April, Yeovil's penultimate home match of the season saw them face champions Northampton Town, they took an early lead through Bournemouth loanee Harry Cornick but Northampton equalised before half-time and the match ended in a 1–1 draw. Yeovil's final away match of the season saw them travel to Barnet, on 30 April, after a poor start to the match Yeovil trailed 2–0, before Matthew Dolan pulled a goal back but John Akinde soon restored Barnet's two goal advantage. Yeovil hit back through Nathan Smith's, second goal for the club and first since 2008, and equalised with fifteen minutes remaining through François Zoko. Then with seconds remaining a counter-attack saw Liam Walsh find Harry Cornick who scored to give Yeovil a 4–3 win. Yeovil's season ended with a 1–0 home defeat against Leyton Orient. The club's end of season awards, followed the conclusion of the Leyton Orient match, with the awards being shared between Swansea City loanee Connor Roberts who picked up four player of the season awards as well as the Bobby Hamilton Young Player of the Year award, while goalkeeper Artur Krysiak also picked up four awards as well as the Community Champion award.

== Summary and aftermath ==
Yeovil struggled in the first half of the season with only 11 points from their first 20 league games, but after the sacking of manager Paul Sturrock the club's form turned around and after picking up 38 points under his replacement Darren Way the club finished safely in lower mid-table. In the league the team won 6 matches, drew 9 and lost 8 at home, compared to winning 5, drawing 6 and losing 12 away from home. The club's 43 league goals was the fewest in League Two. Connor Roberts recorded the highest number of appearances during the season, appearing in 53 of Yeovil's 54 matches. Ryan Bird, Harry Cornick and François Zoko were the club's joint top scorers with 8 goals each, with Bird scoring the most in the league.

The end of the season saw Way release eight players, including Jack Compton, Jordan Gibbons, Simon Gillett, Shaun Jeffers, Marc Laird, Leroy Lita, Jakub Sokolík and Chris Weale, while the club terminated the contracts of Mark Beck and Wes Fogden a year early. Six players were offered new contracts by Darren Way, defender Nathan Smith and Ivorian striker François Zoko agreed new one-year contracts, while goalkeeper Artur Krysiak, Ryan Dickson and Omar Sowunmi all agreed two-year contract extensions. Defensive midfielder Ben Tozer verbally agreed a new contract subject to him passing a medical after recovering from an operation on his knee, but later rejected the offer to sign for Newport County.

== Club ==
The club's management team and backroom staff remained largely the same as the end of the 2014–15 season, with manager Paul Sturrock signing a new two-year contract having been working with the club informally since his appointment in April 2015. In addition his assistant Terry Skiverton and coach Darren Way both agreed new deals to extend their stay at the club. Goalkeeper Chris Weale signed a new contract with the club to takeover from Gareth Stewart as the club's new goalkeeping coach. Further cost-cutting measures saw the departure of head physio Simon Baker at the end of the season with Mike Micciche assuming sole physio duties. On 1 December, following a run of twelve league games without a victory and the club bottom of the Football League, Yeovil sacked manager Paul Sturrock and installed first team coach Darren Way as his successor as interim manager. Way drafted in former Yeovil striker Chris Giles as acting first team coach to fill the void following his own promotion to interim manager. On 31 December, after six games as interim boss the club confirmed the appointment of Darren Way as permanent boss, although without confirming the length of his contract.

The 2015–16 season saw the relaunch of the club's youth academy after a two-season hiatus, with former Torquay United academy manager Geoff Harrop joining the newly formed Category 3 set up in the same role. On 10 July 2015, the club announced that former Plymouth Argyle player and coach David Byrne as head of youth responsible for the coaching of the academy and under 18's manager.

A new home and away kit were once again introduced. The new home kit again featured green and white hoops, but in the new kit with wider green and white stripe than previously and with the club crest inside of a shield to make the crest more prominent on the green hoop. While the away kit saw a copy of the previous seasons home kit, featuring a gold jersey with green hoops themselves made up of six further green stripes. The kits continued to feature Thatchers Cider as rear shirt sponsor, but the 2015–16 season saw the return of Jones Building Group as the club's main sponsor on an initial one-year contract.

=== Coaching staff ===
Until 1 December 2015

Position	Staff
Manager	Paul Sturrock
Assistant manager	Terry Skiverton
First team coach	Darren Way
Goalkeeping coach	Chris Weale
Physio	Mike Micciche

From 1 December 2015

Position	Staff
Manager	Darren Way
Assistant manager	Terry Skiverton
Goalkeeping coach	Chris Weale
Physio	Mike Micciche

=== Kit ===
Supplier: Sondico
Sponsor(s): Jones Building Group

Home	Away

== Transfers ==
=== In ===
Date	Name	From	Fee	Ref
1 July 2015	Jack Compton	Hartlepool United	Free (released)	
1 July 2015	Ryan Dickson	Crawley Town	Nominal	
1 July 2015	Matthew Dolan	Bradford City	Free (released)	
1 July 2015	Jordan Gibbons	Queens Park Rangers	Free (released)	
1 July 2015	Shaun Jeffers	Newport County	Free (released)	
1 July 2015	Marc Laird	Tranmere Rovers	Free	
1 July 2015	Omar Sowunmi	Ipswich Town	Free (released)	
1 July 2015	Ben Tozer	Northampton Town	Free (released)	
3 July 2015	Jamie Burrows	Rangers	Free (released)	
14 July 2015	Ryan Bird	Cambridge United	Free (released)	
17 July 2015	Wes Fogden	Portsmouth	Free (released)	
22 July 2015	Alex Lacey	Luton Town	Free	
24 July 2015	Mark Beck	Carlisle United	Free	
28 July 2015	Iffy Allen	Barnet	Free (released)	
21 August 2015	David Norris	Peterborough United	Free (released)	
8 November 2015	Darren Ward	Swindon Town	Free (released)	
21 November 2015	François Zoko	Blackpool	Free (released)	
5 March 2016	Leroy Lita	AO Chania	Free (released)	

=== Out ===
Date	Name	To	Fee	Ref
20 July 2015	A-Jay Leitch-Smith	Port Vale	Contract terminated by mutual consent	
1 September 2015	David Norris	Blackpool	Released	
24 October 2015	Jamie Burrows	Retired	Contract terminated by mutual consent	
1 February 2016	Iffy Allen	Torquay United	Free	
16 May 2016	Mark Beck	Darlington 1883	Contract terminated by mutual consent	
16 May 2016	Wes Fogden	Havant & Waterlooville	Contract terminated by mutual consent	
30 June 2016	Ben Tozer	Newport County	Rejected new contract	
30 June 2016	Jack Compton	Newport County	Released	
30 June 2016	Jordan Gibbons	Wingate & Finchley	Released	
30 June 2016	Simon Gillett	Retired	Released	
30 June 2016	Shaun Jeffers	Chelmsford City	Released	
30 June 2016	Marc Laird	Edinburgh City	Released	
30 June 2016	Leroy Lita	Sisaket	Released	
30 June 2016	Jakub Sokolík	Southend United	Released	
30 June 2016	Chris Weale	Derby County	Released	

=== Loan in ===
Date	Name	From	End date	Ref
1 July 2015	Stephen Arthurworrey	Fulham	8 May 2016	
7 August 2015	Harry Cornick	Bournemouth	11 January 2016	
8 August 2015	Connor Roberts	Swansea City	8 May 2016	
18 August 2015	Josh Wakefield	Bournemouth	24 September 2015	
11 September 2015	Jake Howells	Luton Town	11 October 2015	
26 September 2015	Josh Sheehan	Swansea City	5 January 2016	
24 October 2015	George Thomas	Coventry City	11 December 2015	
26 November 2015	Christian Maghoma	Tottenham Hotspur	2 January 2016	
2 January 2016	Tahvon Campbell	West Bromwich Albion	8 May 2016	
6 January 2016	Liam Walsh	Everton	8 May 2016	
26 January 2016	Harry Cornick	Bournemouth	8 May 2016	
20 February 2016	Brandon Goodship	Bournemouth	8 May 2016	
24 March 2016	Liam Shephard	Swansea City	8 May 2016	

=== Loan out ===
Date	Name	To	End date	Ref
26 January 2016	Mark Beck	Wrexham	1 May 2016	
1 February 2016	Shaun Jeffers	Woking	1 March 2016	
5 March 2016	Simon Gillett	Peterborough United	3 May 2016	

== Match results ==
=== League Two ===
League Two match details
Date	League position	Opponents	Venue	Result	Score F–A	Scorers	Attendance	Ref
8 August 2015	16th	Exeter City	A	L	2–3	Cornick, Dolan (pen)	5,659	
15 August 2015	21st	Bristol Rovers	H	L	0–1		5,895	
18 August 2015	23rd	York City	A	L	0–1		2,849	
22 August 2015	19th	Luton Town	H	W	3–2	Arthurworrey, Bird (2)	3,830	
29 August 2015	21st	Oxford United	A	L	0–2		6,018	
5 September 2015	23rd	Morecambe	H	L	2–4	Cornick, Sowunmi	3,024	
12 September 2015	22nd	AFC Wimbledon	H	D	1–1	Bird	3,687	
19 September 2015	20th	Crawley Town	A	W	1–0	Cornick	2,112	
26 September 2015	21st	Hartlepool United	H	L	1–2	Bird	3,078	
29 September 2015	22nd	Accrington Stanley	A	L	1–2	Sheehan	1,309	
3 October 2015	22nd	Portsmouth	A	D	0–0		17,309	
10 October 2015	21st	Dagenham & Redbridge	H	D	2–2	Bird, Sokolík	3,204	
17 October 2015	22nd	Notts County	A	L	0–2		4,030	
20 October 2015	23rd	Mansfield Town	H	L	0–1		2,954	
24 October 2015	23rd	Cambridge United	H	L	2–3	Bird, Sheehan	3,224	
31 October 2015	24th	Carlisle United	A	L	2–3	Bird, Cornick	4,095	
14 November 2015	23rd	Stevenage	H	D	2–2	Cornick, Jeffers	3,220	
21 November 2015	23rd	Newport County	A	D	0–0		3,084	
24 November 2015	24th	Wycombe Wanderers	H	L	0–1		2,963	
28 November 2015	24th	Northampton Town	A	L	0–2		4,989	
12 December 2015	23rd	Barnet	H	D	2–2	Zoko (2)	3,162	
19 December 2015	23rd	Leyton Orient	A	D	1–1	Zoko	4,686	
26 December 2015	23rd	Plymouth Argyle	A	L	0–1		12,821	
28 December 2015	24th	Oxford United	H	D	0–0		4,661	
2 January 2016	23rd	York City	H	W	1–0	Dolan (pen)	3,866	
16 January 2016	23rd	Morecambe	A	L	1–2	Ward	1,340	
23 January 2016	22nd	Crawley Town	H	W	2–1	Bird, Campbell	3,423	
30 January 2016	22nd	AFC Wimbledon	A	W	3–2	Compton (3, 1 pen)	4,525	
2 February 2016	21st	Luton Town	A	D	1–1	Walsh	7,538	
13 February 2016	22nd	Hartlepool United	A	L	1–2	Zoko	3,923	
20 February 2016	23rd	Portsmouth	H	D	1–1	Zoko	6,051	
23 February 2016	22nd	Plymouth Argyle	H	D	0–0		5,788	
27 February 2016	21st	Dagenham & Redbridge	A	W	1–0	Goodship	2,942	
1 March 2016	21st	Accrington Stanley	H	W	1–0	Dickson	3,207	
5 March 2016	20th	Mansfield Town	A	W	1–0	Dickson	2,713	
12 March 2016	20th	Notts County	H	W	1–0	Zoko	3,588	
19 March 2016	20th	Cambridge United	A	L	0–3		4,956	
25 March 2016	20th	Carlisle United	H	D	0–0		4,075	
2 April 2016	19th	Newport County	H	W	1–0	Compton (pen)	4,063	
5 April 2016	19th	Stevenage	A	D	0–0		2,748	
9 April 2016	20th	Exeter City	H	L	0–2		5,394	
16 April 2016	20th	Bristol Rovers	A	L	1–2	Lita	10,264	
19 April 2016	19th	Wycombe Wanderers	A	D	0–0		2,812	
23 April 2016	20th	Northampton Town	H	D	1–1	Cornick	4,008	
30 April 2016	18th	Barnet	A	W	4–3	Dolan, Smith, Zoko, Cornick	2,379	
7 May 2016	19th	Leyton Orient	H	L	0–1		4,163	

==== League table ====
Pos	Team	Pld	W	D	L	GF	GA	GD	Pts
17	Notts County	46	14	9	23	54	83	−29	51
18	Stevenage	46	11	15	20	52	67	−15	48
19	Yeovil Town	46	11	15	20	43	59	−16	48
20	Crawley Town	46	13	8	25	45	78	−33	47
21	Morecambe	46	12	10	24	69	91	−22	46

Updated to match(es) played on 7 May 2016. Source: BBC Sport
Rules for classification: 1) Points; 2) Goal difference; 3) Number of goals scored

=== FA Cup ===
FA Cup match details
Round	Date	Opponents	Venue	Result	Score F–A	Scorers	Attendance	Ref
First round	8 November 2015	Maidstone United	A	W	1–0	Fogden	2,811	
Second round	5 December 2015	Stevenage	H	W	1–0	Tozer	2,264	
Third round	10 January 2016	Carlisle United	A^{[A]}	D	2–2	Zoko, Jeffers	3,357	
Third round replay	19 January 2016	Carlisle United	H	D	1–1^{[B]}	Compton	4,114	

=== League Cup ===
League Cup match details
Round	Date	Opponents	Venue	Result	Score F–A	Scorers	Attendance	Ref
First round	11 August 2015	Queens Park Rangers	H	L	0–3		4,058	

=== Football League Trophy ===
Football League Trophy match details
Round	Date	Opponents	Venue	Result	Score F–A	Scorers	Attendance	Ref
First round	1 September 2015	Barnet	H	W	1–0	Dembélé (og)	1,203	
Second round	6 October 2015	Coventry City	H	D	0–0^{[C]}		1,605	
Southern Quarter-final	10 November 2015	Gillingham	A	D	1–1^{[D]}	Cornick	1,832	
Southern Semi-final	8 December 2015	Oxford United	A	L	2–3	Fogden, Jeffers	2,532	

== Squad statistics ==
Numbers in parentheses denote appearances as substitute.
Players with squad numbers struck through and marked † left the club during the playing season.
Players with names in italics and marked * were on loan from another club for the whole of their season with Yeovil.
Players listed with no appearances have been in the matchday squad but only as unused substitutes.
Key to positions: GK – Goalkeeper; DF – Defender; MF – Midfielder; FW – Forward

No.	Pos.	Nat.	Name	Apps	Goals	Apps	Goals	Apps	Goals	Apps	Goals	Apps	Goals	Yellow card	Red card
No.	Pos.	Nat.	Name	League		FA Cup		League Cup		FL Trophy		Total		Discipline	
1	GK	POL	Artur Krysiak	38	0	3	0	1	0	2	0	44	0	1	1
2	DF	ENG	Ben Tozer	22 (4)	0	3 (1)	1	0	0	2	0	27 (5)	1	5	0
3	DF	JAM	Nathan Smith	38 (2)	1	2 (1)	0	1	0	4	0	45 (3)	1	5	1
4	MF	ENG	Matthew Dolan	38 (1)	3	3	0	1	0	4	0	46 (1)	3	7	1
5	DF	ENG	Stephen Arthurworrey *	14	1	0	0	1	0	2	0	17	1	3	0
6	DF	CZE	Jakub Sokolík	32 (2)	1	4	0	1	0	1	0	38 (2)	1	4	1
7	MF	IRL	Kevin Dawson	4 (6)	0	0 (1)	0	0	0	0	0	4 (7)	0	1	0
8	MF	SCO	Marc Laird	14 (6)	0	0	0	1	0	1	0	16 (6)	0	6	0
9	FW	ENG	Ryan Bird	19 (17)	8	2 (1)	0	0	0	1 (2)	0	22 (20)	8	4	0
10	FW	ENG	Shaun Jeffers	13 (12)	1	2 (1)	1	1	0	2 (1)	1	18 (14)	3	0	1
11	DF	ENG	Ryan Dickson	34 (3)	2	4	0	0	0	1	0	39 (3)	2	5	0
12	GK	ENG	Chris Weale	8 (1)	0	1 (1)	0	0	0	2	0	12 (1)	0	1	0
14	MF	WAL	Jack Compton	14 (6)	4	2	1	0	0	1	0	17 (6)	5	0	0
15	MF	ENG	Jordan Gibbons	1 (2)	0	0	0	0	0	0 (1)	0	1 (3)	0	1	0
~~16~~ †	FW	CUW	Jamie Burrows	0 (1)	0	0	0	0 (1)	0	0	0	0 (2)	0	0	0
~~16~~ †	MF	WAL	George Thomas *	3 (2)	0	0	0	0	0	0	0	3 (2)	0	0	0
16	FW	ENG	Tahvon Campbell *	8 (9)	1	1	0	0	0	0	0	9 (9)	1	2	0
17	DF	ENG	Omar Sowunmi	3 (2)	1	1	0	0	0	2	0	6 (2)	1	0	0
18	MF	ENG	Simon Gillett	0 (6)	0	0	0	0	0	0	0	0 (6)	0	0	0
~~19~~ †	MF	ENG	Iffy Allen	2 (10)	0	0 (1)	0	1	0	0 (2)	0	3 (13)	0	0	0
19	FW	ENG	Brandon Goodship *	6 (4)	1	0	0	0	0	0	0	6 (4)	1	0	0
20	MF	ENG	Wes Fogden	13	0	1	1	0 (1)	0	3	1	17 (1)	2	1	0
21	DF	ENG	Alex Lacey	16 (4)	0	1 (1)	0	1	0	2	0	20 (5)	0	2	1
22	FW	SCO	Mark Beck	3 (5)	0	0	0	0 (1)	0	0	0	3 (6)	0	0	0
23	FW	ENG	Harry Cornick *	28 (8)	7	1	0	1	0	4	1	34 (8)	8	1	0
24	DF	WAL	Connor Roberts *	45	0	4	0	1	0	4	0	54	0	7	0
~~25~~ †	MF	ENG	Josh Wakefield *	5	0	0	0	0	0	1	0	6	0	1	0
~~25~~ †	DF	ENG	Christian Maghoma *	0	0	0	0	0	0	0	0	0	0	0	0
25	MF	ENG	Liam Walsh *	15	1	2	0	0	0	0	0	17	1	4	1
~~26~~ †	MF	WAL	Jake Howells *	5 (1)	0	0	0	0	0	1	0	6 (1)	0	0	0
26	DF	ENG	Darren Ward	18	1	3	0	0	0	2	0	23	1	2	0
27	MF	ENG	Max Melanson	0	0	0	0	0	0	0	0	0	0	0	0
~~28~~ †	MF	ENG	David Norris	0 (1)	0	0	0	0	0	0	0	0 (1)	0	0	0
28	MF	ENG	Ollie Bassett	2	0	0	0	0	0	0	0	2	0	0	0
29	GK	ENG	James Needle	0	0	0	0	0	0	0	0	0	0	0	0
~~30~~ †	MF	WAL	Josh Sheehan *	13	2	2	0	0	0	1	0	16	2	2	0
32	DF	WAL	Liam Shephard *	6	0	0	0	0	0	0	0	6	0	1	0
38	FW	ENG	Leroy Lita	4 (4)	1	0	0	0	0	0	0	4 (4)	1	1	0
39	FW	CIV	François Zoko	22 (3)	7	2 (1)	1	0	0	1	0	25 (4)	8	3	0

=== Suspensions ===
Player	Date Received	Offence	Length of suspension	
Matthew Dolan	(yellow card) (yellow-red card) v Bristol Rovers, 15 August	Second bookable offence	1 match	York City (A), League Two
Shaun Jeffers	(red card) v Morecambe, 5 September	Serious foul play	3 matches	AFC Wimbledon (H), Crawley Town (A), Hartlepool United (H), League Two
Jakub Sokolík	(red card) v Maidstone United, 8 November	Serious foul play	3 matches	Gillingham (A), FL Trophy, Stevenage (H), Newport County (A), League Two
Artur Krysiak	(red card) v Maidstone United, 8 November	Denying an obvious goalscoring opportunity	1 match	Gillingham (A), FL Trophy
Alex Lacey	(red card) v Carlisle United, 19 January	Serious foul play	3 matches	Crawley Town (H), AFC Wimbledon (A), Luton Town (A), League Two
Nathan Smith	(red card) v Hartlepool United, 13 February	Violent conduct	3 matches	Portsmouth (H), Plymouth Argyle (H), Dagenham & Redbridge (A), League Two
Liam Walsh	(red card) v Cambridge United, 19 March	Violent conduct	3 matches	Carlisle United (H), Newport County (H), Stevenage (A), League Two

== Footnotes ==
A. Yeovil's FA Cup third round tie with Carlisle United was moved to the home of Blackpool, Bloomfield Road, due to flood damage at Brunton Park.
B. Carlisle United won 5–4 in a penalty shootout following a 1–1 draw after extra time.
C. Yeovil Town won 4–3 in a penalty shootout following a 0–0 draw in normal time.
D. Yeovil Town won 5–4 in a penalty shootout following a 1–1 draw in normal time.

== See also ==
- 2015–16 in English football
- List of Yeovil Town F.C. seasons
