= 2014 FA Trophy final =

2014 FA Trophy Final
- Event: 2013–14 FA Trophy
Cambridge United	Gosport Borough
4	0
- Date: 23 March 2014
- Venue: Wembley Stadium, London
- Man of the Match: Ryan Donaldson
- Referee: Craig Pawson
- Attendance: 18,120

The 2014 FA Trophy Final was the 45th final of the Football Association's cup competition for levels 5–8 of the English football league system. The match was contested between Cambridge United of the Conference Premier and Gosport Borough of the Conference South. Neither team had been in the final before: this was only the third time that Gosport had reached the "proper" rounds of the Trophy, and were playing at Wembley Stadium for the first time in their history, while Cambridge were playing there for the first time since 2009, when they lost the Conference play-off final to Torquay United.

Cambridge United defeated Salisbury City, St Albans City, Luton Town, Eastleigh and Grimsby Town en route to the Final.

Gosport Borough defeated Dorchester Town, Concord Rangers, Nuneaton Town, Hungerford Town, North Ferriby United and Havant & Waterlooville en route to the Final.

Cambridge won the game 4–0.

== Match ==
=== Details ===
23 March 2014
15:00 GMT

Cambridge United	4–0	Gosport Borough
Bird 38'; Donaldson 50', 59'; Berry 78' (pen.)	Report

Wembley Stadium, London
Attendance: 18,120
Referee: Craig Pawson

GK	13	(England) Will Norris
RB	14	(Scotland) Richard Tait
CB	6	(England) Ian Miller (c)
CB	4	(England) Josh Coulson	(substituted off) 87'
LB	3	(England) Greg Taylor
CM	18	(England) Luke Berry
CM	8	(England) Tom Champion
CM	17	(England) Liam Hughes	(substituted off) 73'
RW	29	(England) Josh Gillies	(substituted off) 61'
FW	25	(England) Ryan Bird
LW	7	(England) Ryan Donaldson
Substitutes:
DF	2	(England) Kevin Roberts
DF	5	(Scotland) Tom Bonner	(substituted on) 87'
FW	15	(England) Andy Pugh	(substituted on) 61'
MF	16	(Australia) Mitch Austin
MF	24	(England) Nathan Arnold	(substituted on) 73'
Manager:
(England) Richard Money

GK	1	(England) Nathan Ashmore
RB	2	(England) Lee Molyneaux
CB	3	(England) Andy Forbes
CB	6	(England) Sam Pearce	(yellow card) 78'
LB	5	(England) Brett Poate
RM	35	(Scotland) Josh Carmichael
CM	4	(England) Jamie Brown (c)
CM	8	(England) Danny Smith		(substituted off) 58'
LM	18	(England) Michael Gosney		(substituted off) 72'
FW	9	(England) Tim Sills		(substituted off) 58'
FW	10	(England) Justin Bennett
Substitutes:
MF	11	(England) Adam Wilde
FW	12	(England) Rory Williams		(substituted on) 58'
FW	14	(England) Dan Wooden		(substituted on) 72'
MF	15	(England) Dan Woodward		(substituted on) 58'
MF	23	(England) Ryan Scott
Manager:
(England) Alex Pike
