= Stephen Arthurworrey =

English footballer

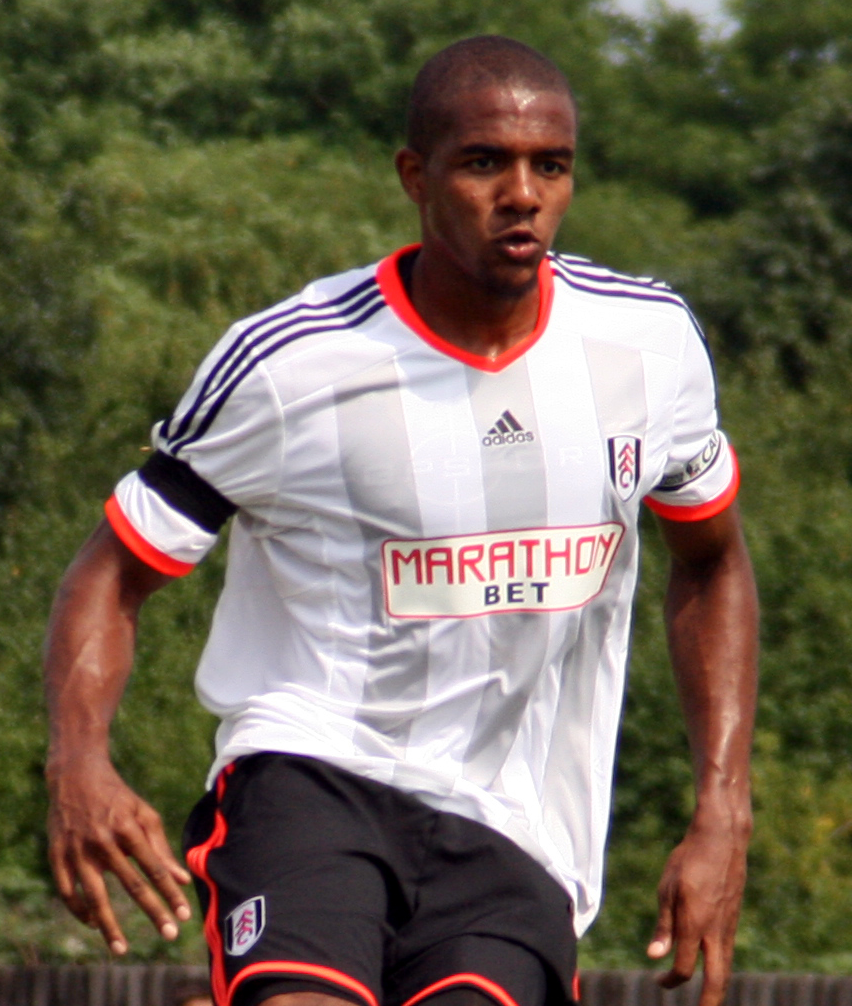
- Arthurworrey in action for Fulham in 2014.

Personal information
- Full name: Stephen Roy Arthurworrey
- Date of birth: 15 October 1994 (age 32)
- Place of birth: Hackney, England
- Height: 1.94 m (6 ft 4 1/2 in)
- Position: Defender

Youth career
- 2005–2012: Fulham

Senior career*
| Years | Team | Apps | (Gls) |
| 2012–2016 | Fulham | 0 | (0) |
| 2014 | → Tranmere Rovers (loan) | 17 | (0) |
| 2014–2015 | → Yeovil Town (loan) | 29 | (2) |
| 2015–2016 | → Yeovil Town (loan) | 14 | (1) |
- * Club domestic league appearances and goals as of 13:49, 10 June 2016 (UTC)

Stephen Roy Arthurworrey (born 15 October 1994) is an English former professional footballer who plays as a defender most recently for Fulham.

== Club career ==
=== Fulham ===
Arthurworrey joined the Fulham academy at the age of ten, despite interests from Leyton Orient and West Ham United. He progressed through the club's academy and earned his first professional contract in October 2011 signing a three-year deal. Shortly after, Arthurworrey, however, suffered knee ligament damage in a Reserves game against Everton that saw him undergo surgery three times. Following his recovery from a knee injury, under coach Kit Symons, he made a return and continued to play in the club's reserve team.

Arthurworrey signed a new one-year contract with Fulham on 3 July 2014. He made his first team debut for the club, starting the whole game, in a 5–2 loss against Derby County in the last 16 of the League Cup, in what turns out to be his only appearance for Fulham. On 1 July 2015, Fulham confirmed that Arthurworrey had signed a new one-year extension with the club. At the end of the 2015–16 season, he was released by Fulham.

==== Loan to Tranmere Rovers ====
On 1 January 2014, Arthurworrey moved to League One team Tranmere Rovers for an initial one-month loan.

He made his Football League debut the same day in a 1–1 draw against Wolverhampton Wanderers at Prenton Park. On 4 February 2014, Arthurworry extended his loan at the club for another month. Since joining Tranmere Rovers, he quickly established himself in the first team, playing in the centre–back position. His impressive performance with the club led to extension until the end of the 2013–14 season. At the end of the 2013–14 season, Arthurworrey made seventeen appearances in all competitions and returned to his parent club.

==== Loans to Yeovil Town ====
On 31 October 2014, Arthurworrey joined Yeovil Town on loan until 31 January 2015. The next day, he made his debut for the club, in a 0–0 draw against Chesterfield. Since joining Yeovil Town, Arthurworrey quickly established himself in the first team, playing in the centre–back position. He scored his first professional goal on 13 December 2014, in a 4–0 win over Oldham Athletic. Having made sixteen appearances for the club until on 29 January 2015, his loan was extended until the end of the 2014–15 season. However, Arthurworrey was unable to help Yeovil Town survive relegation after a 1–1 draw against Notts County on 11 April 2015. Three days later on 14 April 2015, he scored his second Yeovil goal, in a 1–0 win over Sheffield United. Despite missing two matches during the 2014–15 season, he made thirty-three appearances and scoring two times in all competitions

On the same day he signed a contract with Fulham, Arthurworrey re-joined Yeovil Town on loan for the 2015–16 season. He made his second debut for the club, starting the whole game, in a 3–2 loss against Exeter City in the opening game of the season. Since re-joining Yeovil Town, Arthurworrey continued to regain his first team place, playing in the centre–back position. He then scored his first goal for the club and set up two other goals, in a 3–1 win against Luton Town on 22 August 2015. On 27 October 2015, Arthurworrey's loan spell with Yeovil was cut short after suffering a serious knee injury. By the time he was loaned out, Arthurworrey made seventeen appearances and scored once in all competitions.

After being release by Fulham, Arthurworrey went on trial at Southend United but it was unsuccessful. Following this, he retired from professional football and has been returning to university while working part-time as a sports specialist.

== Career statistics ==
As of match played 20 October 2015.

| Club | Season | League | | | FA Cup | | League Cup | | Other | | Total | |
| Club | Season | Division | Apps | Goals | Apps | Goals | Apps | Goals | Apps | Goals | Apps | Goals |
|---|---|---|---|---|---|---|---|---|---|---|---|---|
| Fulham | 2013–14 | Premier League | 0 | 0 | 0 | 0 | 0 | 0 | 0 | 0 | 0 | 0 |
| Fulham | 2014–15 | Championship | 0 | 0 | 0 | 0 | 1 | 0 | 0 | 0 | 1 | 0 |
| Fulham | Total | | 0 | 0 | 0 | 0 | 1 | 0 | 0 | 0 | 1 | 0 |
| Tranmere Rovers (loan) | 2013–14 | League One | 17 | 0 | – | | – | | 0 | 0 | 17 | 0 |
| Yeovil Town (loan) | 2014–15 | League One | 29 | 2 | 4 | 0 | – | | 0 | 0 | 33 | 2 |
| Yeovil Town (loan) | 2015–16 | League Two | 14 | 1 | 0 | 0 | 1 | 0 | 2 (Note: Appearances in Football League Trophy) | 0 | 17 | 1 |
| Career total | | | 60 | 3 | 4 | 0 | 2 | 0 | 2 | 0 | 68 | 3 |

== Personal life ==
Arthurworrey grew up supporting Arsenal and was nicknamed "Big Dog", due to his height.
