= Jack Compton =

Welsh footballer (born 1988)

Personal information
- Full name: Jack Louis Paul Compton
- Date of birth: 2 September 1988 (age 38)
- Place of birth: Barry, Wales
- Height: 5 ft 10 in (1.78 m)
- Position: Winger

Youth career
- 2001–2006: Portsmouth

Senior career*
Years	Team	Apps	(Gls)
2006–2008	West Bromwich Albion	0	(0)
2008	→ Weymouth (loan)	3	(0)
2008	Brighton & Hove Albion	0	(0)
2008	→ Lewes (loan)	3	(0)
2008–2009	Havant & Waterlooville	6	(1)
2009–2010	Weston-super-Mare	30	(4)
2010–2012	Falkirk	37	(3)
2011–2012	→ Bradford City (loan)	14	(1)
2012	→ St Johnstone (loan)	3	(0)
2012	Portsmouth	13	(0)
2013	Colchester United	7	(0)
2013–2015	Hartlepool United	55	(4)
2015–2016	Yeovil Town	20	(4)
2016–2017	Newport County	8	(1)
2017	→ Merthyr Town (loan)		
2017–2018	Bath City	14	(5)
2018–2019	Chippenham Town	2	(1)
2019–2020	Barry Town United	15	(1)
2021	Cadoxton Barry	1	(0)
- * Club domestic league appearances and goals

Jack Louis Paul Compton (born 2 September 1988) is a Welsh former footballer who played as a winger.

== Career ==
Compton began his career as a youth academy player with Portsmouth before signing for West Bromwich Albion at the age of 17. However, he was unable to break into the first team and joined Conference National side Weymouth on a one-month loan deal in February 2008, making his debut in a 0–0 draw with Torquay United. He made a total of four appearances with the club before returning to West Bromwich Albion.

Following his release, Compton spent time on trial with Football League One side Brighton & Hove Albion, featuring in three pre-season friendly matches, before signing a short-term deal at the club in August 2008. Having not made an appearance for Brighton, he joined Conference National side Lewes on loan on 6 October 2008. Released by Brighton on his return, Compton spent a two-month spell with Havant & Waterlooville, before joining Weston-super-Mare. While playing with the Somerset-based club, Compton also worked as a part-time gardener.

=== Falkirk ===
His performances attracted the attention of Falkirk manager Eddie May, who beat off competition from Football League Championship side Newcastle United to sign Compton on a pre-contract deal. He arrived at Falkirk during the January transfer window and made his debut for the club as a substitute in place of Ryan Flynn during a 1–1 draw with Celtic. In his first season, Compton made 12 league appearances and Falkirk was relegated to the Scottish First Division. In his second season, Compton made 24 league appearances and scored against Stirling Albion, Cowdenbeath and Raith Rovers.

On 5 July, Compton and Falkirk had reached an agreement to tear up the last remaining year of his contract.

=== Loan spell at Bradford and St Johnstone ===
On 29 July 2011 it was reported on the Falkirk website that Compton had joined Bradford City on loan, becoming the third man joining Bradford from Falkirk along with Mark Stewart and Chris Mitchell. This was after initially not earning a permanent deal at the West Yorkshire club following a trial. On 6 August 2011, Compton made his league debut for the club in a 2–1 loss against Aldershot Town and setting up a goal for James Hanson. On 9 August 2011, he scored his first goal for the club in a 3–2 defeat to local rivals Leeds United. Nearing the ending of his loan spell at Bradford, the club was keen to extend a loan on Compton following Kyel Reid injury.

Compton signed on loan for St Johnstone in January 2012. On his move, Compton says he can make an impact at St Johnstone. However, he went on to make only three appearances, all coming from the bench.

=== Portsmouth ===
On 10 August, he confirmed on Twitter that he had signed a contract with Portsmouth, after being on trial with the club. On his move to Portsmouth, Compton said "I love this club" and admits he was "gobsmacked" when receiving offers from the club. Six days later, the deal was officially confirmed, with Compton signing a one-month contract. In the opening game of the season, he made his debut, making his first start, in a 1–1 draw against Bournemouth. In a 4–2 loss against Carlisle United, he played 90 minutes and set up a goal for Conor Clifford in a late minutes. However, Compton then found games hard to come by, and in late-November 2012, he was close to joining Plymouth Argyle on loan but the deal stalled, caretaker manager Guy Whittingham stating that Compton had a future at the club. Soon after, Compton was involved in an incident on Twitter when he grew frustrated by the lack of first team involvement and eventually apologised to Whittingham in person. Compton was then deemed surplus to requirements at Portsmouth, and was released from the club in the January transfer window.

=== Colchester United ===
On 1 January 2013, Compton signed with fellow League One team Colchester United and made his debut for the club as a second-half substitute for Gavin Massey in a 3–0 defeat against Crawley Town the same day. He became the 600th player to represent Colchester United in the Football League with his debut.

Compton found his chances limited at Colchester, having made only seven appearances and starting only one of those matches. After just three months with the club, he was released from his contract on 11 April 2013.

=== Hartlepool United ===
On 27 June 2013, Compton signed for Hartlepool United following his Colchester United exit, becoming new manager Colin Cooper's first summer signing. He scored his first goal for the club on 3 September against former club Bradford City in the Football League Trophy. He scored his first league goals for the club on 5 October, scoring twice in a 4–1 win against Mansfield Town.

=== Yeovil Town ===
On 17 June 2015, Compton joined League Two side Yeovil Town following his release from Hartlepool United signing a one-year contract. He was released at the end of the 2015–16 season.

=== Newport County ===
On 20 June 2016, Compton joined fellow League Two side Newport County following his release from Yeovil Town signing another one-year contract. He scored on his debut for Newport on 6 August 2016 versus Mansfield Town. Mansfield won the match 3–2.

On 15 February 2017 Compton joined Merthyr Town on loan until the end of the 2016–17 season.

On 9 May 2017 Compton was released by Newport at the end of the 2016–17 season.

=== Bath City ===
In July 2017 Compton joined Bath City.

=== Chippenham Town ===
In May 2018, Compton signed for National League South side Chippenham Town.

=== Barry Town United ===
In June 2019 he joined Barry Town United.

== Career statistics ==
As of match played 2 December 2017

Appearances and goals by club, season and competition
Club	Season	League			National Cup		League Cup		Other		Total	
Club	Season	Division	Apps	Goals	Apps	Goals	Apps	Goals	Apps	Goals	Apps	Goals
Weymouth (loan)	2007–08	Conference Premier	3	0	0	0	—		1 (Note: Appearance in Conference League Cup)	0	4	0
Lewes (loan)	2008–09	Conference Premier	3	0	0	0	—		0	0	3	0
Havant & Waterlooville	2008–09	Conference South	6	1	0	0	—		0	0	6	1
Falkirk	2009–10	Scottish Premier League	13	0	1	0	0	0	—		14	0
Falkirk	2010–11	Scottish First Division	24	3	2	1	2	0	0	0	28	4
Falkirk	Total		37	3	3	1	2	0	0	0	42	4
Bradford City (loan)	2011–12	League Two	14	0	2	0	1	1	4 (Note: Appearances in Football League Trophy)	0	21	1
St Johnstone (loan)	2011–12	Scottish Premier League	3	0	0	0	0	0	—		3	0
Portsmouth	2012–13	League One	13	0	1	0	0	0	0	0	14	0
Colchester United	2012–13	League One	7	0	0	0	0	0	0	0	7	0
Hartlepool United	2013–14	League Two	34	4	2	0	1	0	2	1	39	5
Hartlepool United	2014–15	League Two	21	0	1	0	0	0	0	0	22	0
Hartlepool United	Total		55	4	3	0	1	0	2	1	61	5
Yeovil Town	2015–16	League Two	20	4	2	1	0	0	1	0	23	5
Newport County	2016–17	League Two	8	1	1	0	1	0	2 (Note: Appearances in EFL Trophy)	0	12	1
Bath City	2017–18	National League South	8	3	2	0	—		0	0	10	3
Career total			177	16	14	1	5	1	10	1	206	16
