= Josh Carmichael =

Footballer (born 1994)

Personal information
- Date of birth: 27 September 1994 (age 32)
- Place of birth: Poole, England
- Height: 6 ft 0 in (1.83 m)
- Position: Midfielder

Team information
- Current team: AFC Totton

Youth career
- 2004–2011: AFC Bournemouth

Senior career*
Years	Team	Apps	(Gls)
2011–2016	AFC Bournemouth	4	(0)
2014	→ Gosport Borough (loan)	11	(1)
2014	→ Welling United (loan)	4	(0)
2015	→ Havant & Waterlooville (loan)	5	(0)
2015	→ Torquay United (loan)	14	(1)
2016–2017	Gosport Borough	28	(1)
2017–2019	Weymouth	79	(4)
2019–2022	Poole Town	54	(6)
2022–2023	Salisbury	0	(0)
2023–	AFC Totton	0	(0)

International career^{‡}
2009	Scotland U16	1	(0)
2013	Scotland U19	1	(0)
- * Club domestic league appearances and goals as of 20:38, 2 October 2017 (UTC) ‡ National team caps and goals as of 15:50, 27 May 2012 (UTC)

Joshua Lewis A. Carmichael (born 27 September 1994) is a footballer who plays as a midfielder for AFC Totton. Born in England, he represented Scotland internationally at youth levels U16 and U19.

== Club career ==
=== AFC Bournemouth ===
Carmichael was born in Poole, England. He joined AFC Bournemouth at the age of 10 and progressed through the youth system at the club. In the summer of 2011, at the age of 16 he signed a two-year scholarship with the Cherries.

He made his Football League debut on 17 September 2011, in a 2–0 win over Exeter City, replacing Nathan Byrne as a substitute in the first half. After the match, Carmichael said his Bournemouth debut surprised him and his father and uncle was at attendance to see him play. This was his only appearance for Bournemouth of the 2011–12 season.

Then in the 2012–13 season, Carmichael had his first action against Walsall on 29 September 2012, coming on as a substitute for Josh McQuoid in the 59th minute, which Bournemouth lost 2–1. Carmichael made the starting XI for the first time on 2 October 2012 in a 3–1 away defeat by Crawley Town. He went on to make three appearances for the club. Despite this limited number, Carmichael said he was satisfied to be involved in the first team action.

In the 2013–14 season, with his first team hopes increasingly limited following the club's promotion to Championship, he spent much of the season in the club's reserve before joining Gosport Borough on a month-long loan in February. Carmichael made his first start for the club against Havant & Waterlooville and helped the club go through to the FA Trophy final. After the match, Stephen Purches praised his performance, as well as his strength of character. As a result, his loan spell was extended for another month., Carmichael, despite starting, was unable to help Gosport Borough in the 4–0 FA Trophy loss against Cambridge United.

After his loan spell at Gosport Borough came to an end, Carmichael continued to remain on the sideline at Bournemouth before joining Welling United on a month loan. Carmichael made four appearances for Welling before returning to his parent club. Despite a failed loan move to Havant & Waterlooville, Carmichael signed a 12-month contract extension weeks later.

To open the 2015–16 season, he joined National League side Torquay United on a one-month youth loan. He made his Torquay United debut two days later, playing 90 minutes in a 1–0 win over Macclesfield Town, and scored his first Torquay United goal in the next game against Wrexham With seven appearances in August, hopes of Carmichael's loan at Torquay United was extended until January. After making fourteen appearances, Carmichael returned to his parent at the end of December, but did not play any official football for the rest of the campaign.

At the end of the 2015–16 season, it was confirmed on the club's website that Carmichael was among six players to be released by the club.

Carmichael signed for Weymouth on 30 June 2017. In the summer of 2019 he left for fellow Southern League Premier Division side Poole Town.

== International career ==
Though he was born in Poole, England, Carmichael was eligible to play for Scotland. This came after he was called up by Scotland U16 in 2009.

Four years later, Carmichael was called up by Scotland U19.

== Personal life ==
Carmichael attended Poole Grammar School with his classmate, Harry Cornick and supported Bournemouth when he was young.
