= Wes Fogden =

English footballer

Personal information
- Full name: Wesley Keith Fogden
- Date of birth: 12 April 1988 (age 38)
- Place of birth: Brighton, England
- Position: Midfielder

Team information
- Current team: Weymouth

Youth career
- 2004–2006: Brighton & Hove Albion

Senior career*
Years	Team	Apps	(Gls)
2006–2008	Brighton & Hove Albion	3	(0)
2007	→ Dorchester Town (loan)	10	(2)
2007	→ Bognor Regis Town (loan)	5	(0)
2008	→ Dorchester Town (loan)	5	(0)
2008–2009	Dorchester Town	21	(4)
2009–2011	Havant & Waterlooville	105	(29)
2011–2014	AFC Bournemouth	53	(4)
2014–2015	Portsmouth	28	(2)
2015–2016	Yeovil Town	13	(0)
2016–2020	Havant & Waterlooville	132	(22)
2020–2022	Dorking Wanderers	33	(7)
2022–2024	Poole Town	65	(11)
2024–2026	Dorchester Town	47	(4)
2026–	Weymouth	0	(0)

Managerial career
- 2026: Dorchester Town (interim player-manager)
- * Club domestic league appearances and goals as of 10:19, 29 November 2025 (UTC)

Wesley Keith Fogden (born 12 April 1988) is an English professional footballer and coach who plays as a midfielder for Weymouth.

== Club career ==
=== Brighton & Hove Albion ===
Fogden started his career at Brighton & Hove Albion in July 2004, breaking into the first-team in 2007 and making a total of 3 league appearances. Aged just 18, he discovered he had a tumour that was eating into his spine; Fogden underwent successful surgery shortly after and spent three months in a restrictive body cast before working his way back to fitness.

After being fully recovered from tumour, Fogden joined Dorchester Town on loan in early October 2007. After being recalled in December, he joined Bognor Regis Town in the same predicament in April 2008. Fogden made a combined total of 15 league appearances and scored 2 goals.

=== Dorchester Town ===
In August 2008 Fogden re-joined Dorchester Town, initially on loan, but the move was made permanent in the following month. He made 21 league appearances and scored 4 goals.

=== Havant & Waterlooville ===
Fogden's spell at Dorchester didn't last long and in February 2009 he joined Havant & Waterlooville. After scoring 29 goals in 105 league appearances, Fogden became a firm fan's favourite due to his consistent shining performances. Whilst at the club, he joined on a sports coaching and PE course at the University of Chichester. Fogden set a record by becoming the first Hawks player to not only win the Player of the Month award for the third month in a row, but also for accumulating a total of four awards across the nine given out through a single season.

=== AFC Bournemouth ===
On 6 October 2011, Fogden joined AFC Bournemouth on loan. On 23 February 2012 he signed a permanent three-and-a-half-year contract with the Cherries. In the following month Fogden scored the game's only goal against Brentford into the top left corner of the goal.

Fogden missed the last few games of the 2011–12 season due to a shoulder injury. It was later announced that he would be out of action for six months. On 1 September 2012, Fogden made his first appearance of the season replacing Eunan O'Kane at Sheffield United in the 5–3 defeat. Fogden became a regular in Paul Groves' side before he was sacked. After the return of Eddie Howe Fogden lost his place in a competitive team to his teammates. Fogden scored his first goal of the season in the FA Cup first round tie against Dagenham & Redbridge FC coming on as a sub and scoring in injury time. He then scored in the second-round game against Carlisle United and provided Eunan O'Kane with a goal.

Howe credited Fogden as their unsung hero this season as some of his impressive performances in some unnatural positions has saved the team on various occasions. Fogden started the 2013–14 season injured with Howe wanting to convert him into a full-back. However, he did not feature for the club in the season, and was released in January 2014.

=== Portsmouth ===
On 15 January 2014, Fogden joined Portsmouth in an 18-month deal.

His first goal for the club came under caretaker manager Andy Awford, in a relegation match against struggling Bristol Rovers. Twice in the first half Portsmouth took the lead and were pegged back by a dogged Rovers side fighting for their lives. However, in the 70th minute Wes Fogden popped up to poke in the winner for Portsmouth, in front of the Fratton End, after coming on as a second-half substitute, much to the delight of the 17,000 or so Portsmouth fans in the sold out Fratton Park.

=== Yeovil Town ===
After leaving Portsmouth at the end of his contract, Fogden signed for League Two side Yeovil Town on a two-year deal on 17 July 2015.

After struggling with injury, Fogden was released by Yeovil on 16 May 2016, despite having a year left on his contract.

=== Havant & Waterlooville ===
On 13 July 2016, Fogden signed for his old club Havant & Waterlooville in the Isthmian Premier League on a two-year contract. Wes admitted the time was right to step out of full-time football to protect his body from serious damage due to suffering from a persistent knee injury.

On 13 March 2018, Fogden celebrated his 200th appearance for Havant & Waterlooville in the 1–0 win over Wealdstone.

Fogden helped the club achieve back to back titles, winning promotion to the National League the highest in the club's history. Wes also won the Hawk's Player of the season award along with making it into the National League South team of the season for the 2017/18 season.

=== Dorking Wanderers ===
After leaving Havant & Waterlooville, Fogden spent two seasons at Dorking Wanderers between 2020 and 2022, helping the club to victory in the 2021–22 National League South play-off final.

=== Poole Town ===
Fogden signed for Poole Town in June 2022, spending two years with the club.

=== Return to Dorchester Town ===
In July 2024, Fogden re-signed for Dorchester Town, fifteen years after leaving the club.

In October 2025, Fogdenn fractured two vertebrae in his neck during the first half of a FA Trophy match against Basingstoke Town; the match was subsequently abandoned.

On 5 February 2026, Fogden was appointed interim first team manager at Dorchester following the departure of Tom Killick.

== Personal life ==
Fogden is close friends with Shaun MacDonald and Marc Pugh, both former teammates from his time spent at AFC Bournemouth.

Fogden also works as a Project Manager for Elite Skills Arena based in Poole, Dorset.

== Career statistics ==
As of match played 21 October 2025

Appearances and goals by club, season and competition
Club	Season	League			FA Cup		League Cup		Other		Total	
Club	Season	Division	Apps	Goals	Apps	Goals	Apps	Goals	Apps	Goals	Apps	Goals
Brighton & Hove Albion	2006–07	League One	0	0	0	0	0	0	0	0	0	0
Brighton & Hove Albion	2007–08	League One	3	0	0	0	0	0	1 (Note: Appearance(s) in Football League Trophy)	0	4	0
Brighton & Hove Albion	Total		3	0	0	0	0	0	1	0	4	0
Dorchester Town (loan)	2007–08	Conference South	10	2	0	0	—		4 (Note: Three appearances in FA Trophy, one appearance in Conference League Cup)	0	14	2
Bognor Regis Town (loan)	2007–08	Conference South	5	0	0	0	—		0	0	5	0
Dorchester Town	2008–09	Conference South	21	4	5	0	—		1 (Note: Appearance in Conference League Cup)	1	27	5
Havant & Waterlooville	2008–09	Conference South	15	2	0	0	—		1 (Note: Appearance(s) in FA Trophy)	0	16	2
Havant & Waterlooville	2009–10	Conference South	38	8	2	0	—		1	1	41	9
Havant & Waterlooville	2010–11	Conference South	41	14	4	2	—		4 (Note: One appearance and one goal in FA Trophy, three appearances and one goal in Hampshire Senior Cup)	2	49	18
Havant & Waterlooville	2011–12	Conference South	11	5	1	1	—		0	0	12	6
Havant & Waterlooville	Total		105	29	7	3	—		6	3	118	35
AFC Bournemouth	2011–12	League One	27	3	0	0	0	0	1	0	28	3
AFC Bournemouth	2012–13	League One	26	1	4	2	0	0	1	0	31	3
AFC Bournemouth	2013–14	Championship	0	0	0	0	0	0	—		0	0
AFC Bournemouth	Total		53	4	4	2	0	0	2	0	59	6
Portsmouth	2013–14	League Two	19	2	—		—		—		19	2
Portsmouth	2014–15	League Two	9	0	0	0	0	0	0	0	9	0
Portsmouth	Total		28	2	0	0	0	0	0	0	28	2
Yeovil Town	2015–16	League Two	13	0	1	1	1	0	3	1	18	2
Havant & Waterlooville	2016–17	Isthmian League; Premier Division	37	6	0	0	—		5 (Note: Two appearances in FA Trophy, one appearance in Hampshire Senior Cup, two appearances in Portsmouth Senior Cup)	0	42	6
Havant & Waterlooville	2017–18	National League South	41	10	3	0	—		7 (Note: Two appearances in FA Trophy, four appearances in Hampshire Senior Cup, one appearance in Portsmouth Senior Cup)	0	51	10
Havant & Waterlooville	2018–19	National League	28	1	0	0	—		4 (Note: One appearance in FA Trophy, three appearances and one goal in Hampshire Senior Cup)	1	32	2
Havant & Waterlooville	2019–20	National League South	26	5	1	0	—		2 (Note: One appearance in FA Trophy, one appearance in National League South play-offs)	0	29	5
Havant & Waterlooville	Total		132	22	4	0	—		18	1	154	23
Dorking Wanderers	2020–21	National League South	16	4	1	0	—		3	0	20	4
Dorking Wanderers	2021–22	National League South	17	3	0	0	—		2 (Note: One appearance in Surrey Senior Cup, one appearance in National League South play-offs)	0	19	3
Dorking Wanderers	Total		33	7	1	0	—		5	0	39	7
Poole Town	2022–23	Southern League; Premier Division South	32	11	1	0	—		3 (Note: One appearance in FA Trophy, one appearance in Dorset Senior Cup, one appearance in Southern League Premier Division South play-offs)	0	36	11
Poole Town	2023–24	Southern League; Premier Division South	33	0	3	1	—		2	1	38	2
Poole Town	Total		65	11	4	1	—		5	1	74	13
Dorchester Town	2024–25	Southern League; Premier Division South	37	4	1	699,993	—		4 (Note: Two appearances in FA Trophy, two appearances and one goal in Dorset Senior Cup, one appearance in Southern League Premier Division South play-offs)	1	43	5
Dorchester Town	2025–26	Southern League; Premier Division South	10	0	1	0	—		0	0	11	0
Dorchester Town	Total		47	4	2	699,993	—		4	1	54	5
Career total			515	85	28	700,000	1	0	49	8	593	100
