= Iffy Allen =

English footballer (born 1994)

Personal information
- Full name: Ifeanyi Tafari Decosta Allen
- Date of birth: 15 March 1994 (age 32)
- Place of birth: Lambeth, England
- Position: Winger

Team information
- Current team: Maldon & Tiptree

Youth career
- 2008–2009: Fulham
- 2010–2012: Barnet

Senior career*
Years	Team	Apps	(Gls)
2012–2015	Barnet	7	(1)
2014	→ Kingstonian (loan)	4	(0)
2014	→ Redhill (loan)	5	(0)
2014–2015	→ Wingate & Finchley (loan)	7	(0)
2015–2016	Yeovil Town	12	(0)
2016	Torquay United	13	(3)
2016	Aldershot Town	21	(1)
2017	Wrexham	7	(0)
2017–2018	Bromley	14	(1)
2018	→ Wealdstone (loan)	5	(0)
2018	Dulwich Hamlet	6	(1)
2019	Braintree Town	16	(1)
2019–2020	Maidstone United	27	(6)
2020–2021	Ebbsfleet United	10	(0)
2021–2022	Lewes	26	(3)
2022	Hampton & Richmond Borough	10	(0)
2022	Carshalton Athletic	7	(0)
2023–2024	Dover Athletic	27	(2)
2024–2025	St Albans City	7	(0)
2025	→ Needham Market (loan)	12	(3)
- Maldon & Tiptree
- * Club domestic league appearances and goals as of 18:42, 31 March 2026 (UTC)

Ifeanyi "Iffy" Tafari Decosta Allen (born 15 March 1994) is an English professional footballer who plays as a winger for Maldon & Tiptree.

== Career ==
Allen began his career at Fulham as a 14 year old, where he spent a year in the youth team before being released due to his size. He also had a trial with Reading, and then joined Barnet in the summer of 2010, signing a two-year scholarship. He made his debut as a 73rd-minute substitute for Curtis Weston in an FA Cup first round tie at home to Oxford United on 3 November 2012. In January 2013, Allen signed a "long term" professional contract with the Bees. He joined Kingstonian on loan on 10 January 2014. On 19 February, he joined Redhill on loan. Allen scored his first goal for Barnet in a 3–3 draw at Lincoln City on the final day of the 2013–14 season. He joined Wingate & Finchley on a three-month loan on 23 October 2014.

On 28 July 2015, Allen following his release from Barnet signed for League Two side Yeovil Town on a one-year deal.

On 1 February 2016, he signed for Torquay United from Yeovil until the end of the season.

On 22 July 2016, after his release from Torquay, Allen signed for Aldershot Town following a successful trial.

On 21 December 2016, he was released from Aldershot Town by manager Gary Waddock.

On 8 March 2017, he joined Wrexham after a successful spell on trial at the club. However, he was released by the club two months later at the end of the season.

Following his departure from Wrexham at the end of the season, Allen signed for Bromley, who he had impressed against for the Dragons just a month earlier. He signed a one-month loan deal with Wealdstone on 15 January 2018. He was released by Bromley at the end of the season.

Allen joined Dulwich Hamlet in September 2018. He was released two months later. Manager Gavin Rose said "For me he hadn't played to his potential – he had been in the Football League. Iffy has got good ability but for some reason he just didn't settle – it happens. He has shown glimpses in games and if he had done that a little more often he would be a regular in the team. He just found it very difficult to get going. He is a good lad who worked really hard. I hope he finds somewhere he can really kick on."

Allen joined Braintree Town on 18 January 2019. He then joined Maidstone United for the 2019–20 season. and then played for Ebbsfleet United in the curtailed 2020-21 season. He joined Lewes in August 2021. In February 2022, Allen joined National League South side Hampton & Richmond Borough. He then joined Carshalton Athletic in August 2022.

On 17 July 2023, Allen signed for National League South club Dover Athletic. Following relegation, he was released at the end of the 2023–24 season.

After leaving St Albans City at the end of the 2024-2025 season, Allen signed for Isthmian Premier Division side Whitehawk, but left after just one appearance from the bench in August 2025.

Allen signed for Southern League Premier Central Division side AFC Sudbury at the end of August 2025. He then had a short spell at Hashtag United. In March 2026, he joined Cambridge City.

At the start of the 2026-27 season, Allen joined Maldon & Tiptree.
