= Shaun Jeffers =

English footballer (born 1992)

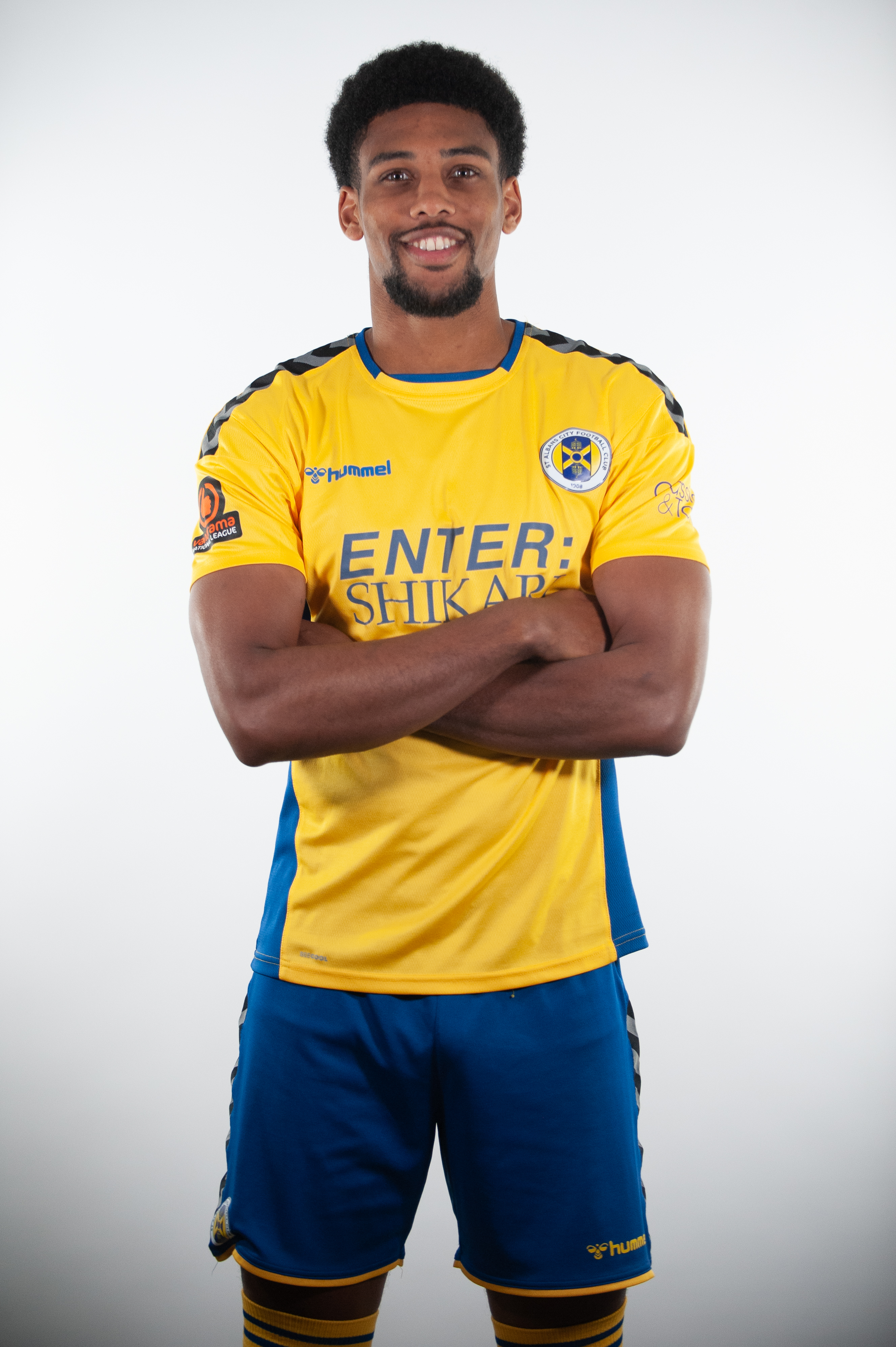

Personal information
- Full name: Shaun Elliot Jeffers
- Date of birth: 14 April 1992 (age 34)
- Place of birth: Bedford, England
- Height: 6 ft 1 in (1.85 m)
- Position: Forward

Team information
- Current team: Peterborough Sports (on loan from Bedford Town)

Youth career
- –2009: Coventry City

Senior career*
Years	Team	Apps	(Gls)
2009–2013	Coventry City	6	(0)
2010–2011	→ Cheltenham Town (loan)	22	(1)
2011	→ Cambridge United (loan)	2	(0)
2012	→ Tamworth (loan)	6	(0)
2013–2014	Peterborough United	8	(1)
2014–2015	Newport County	35	(2)
2014	→ Brackley Town (loan)	7	(2)
2015–2016	Yeovil Town	25	(1)
2016	→ Woking (loan)	1	(0)
2016–2017	Chelmsford City	39	(21)
2017–2018	Boreham Wood	26	(3)
2018	→ Hampton & Richmond Borough (loan)	16	(6)
2018–2019	Brackley Town	12	(1)
2019–2020	Chelmsford City	32	(13)
2020–2025	St Albans City	195	(98)
2025–	Bedford Town	12	(0)
2025–2026	→ Farnborough (loan)	1	(0)
2026–	→ Peterborough Sports (loan)		

International career^{‡}
2010–2011	England U19	2	(0)
- * Club domestic league appearances and goals as of 14:54, 15 December 2025 (UTC) ‡ National team caps and goals as of 13:30, 24 January 2026 (UTC)

Shaun Elliot Jeffers (born 14 April 1992) is an English professional footballer who plays as a forward for Peterborough Sports on loan from National League North club Bedford Town.

== Club career ==
=== Coventry City ===
Jeffers made his professional debut, for Coventry City, on 12 August 2009, in a 1–0 Football League Cup defeat to Hartlepool United. He went on to make his Football League Championship debut three days later as a substitute in a 2–0 win against Barnsley. At the end of the 2009–10 season, Jeffers signed a new deal with the club.

Then, at the end of the 2010–11 season, Jeffers was offered a new deal for another year, which he signed a two-year deal on 20 June 2011.

Shaun was released from the club on 15 May 2013.

==== Loan spells ====
On 6 August 2010, Jeffers moved on loan to Football League Two side Cheltenham Town to gain first team experience, the move was an initial one-month deal, which could be extended further. He made his debut for in the opening game of the season, on 7 August 2010, against Gillingham coming on a substitute. His first professional goal came in a 6–4 reverse at Rotherham United, less than two minutes after Jeffers had entered the pitch as a substitute.

After making four appearances and scoring once, Jeffers had his loan with Cheltenham Town extended until 1 January. Later in his Cheltenham Town career, Jeffers had mostly make appearance by coming on as a substitute in the second half and by January, Jeffers loan spell with the club extended. A few weeks later, Jeffers returned to the Coventry City on 31 January 2011.

On 17 February 2011, Jeffers joined Cambridge United on loan for twenty eight days. He made his debut on 18 February 2010, against Kidderminster Harriers coming on a substitute. Jeffers returned to Coventry City on 21 March 2011. He was recalled so caretaker manager Andy Thorn could assess Jeffers along with the whole squad during a two-week international break.

On the last day of the summer transfer window, Jeffers signed for Tamworth on a one-month loan deal. Having not earning games, Jeffers returned to his parent club.

=== Peterborough United ===
In July 2013, it was reported that Jeffers went on trial at Tranmere Rovers and had played several matches for Tranmere as a trialist. His performance there was successful and he was offered a contract. However, Jeffers rejected a contract offer from Tranmere due to not being offered accommodation as part of the deal, much to Tranmere manager Ronnie Moore's surprise. Jeffers signed for League One side Peterborough United on 16 October 2013. He made his debut three days later, replacing Britt Assombalonga in the 88th minute of a 1–0 win against Shrewsbury Town. He scored his first goals for the club on 7 December, scoring twice in a 5–0 win against Tranmere Rovers in the FA Cup. On 26 December, he scored against former club Coventry in a 4–2 defeat.

=== Newport County ===
On 28 January 2014 Jeffers joined Newport County as part of the deal that took Conor Washington to Peterborough United. He made his debut for Newport County on 15 February 2014 versus Hartlepool. In September 2014 he joined Brackley Town on loan. Jeffers scored his first Football League goal for Newport County in the 3–2 win against Carlisle United on 29 November 2014. He was released by Newport in May 2015 at the end of his contract.

=== Yeovil Town ===
On 23 June 2015, Jeffers signed for League Two side Yeovil Town on a one-year contract after his release from Newport County.

On 2 February 2016, Jeffers joined National League side Woking on a 28-day loan. On 6 February 2016, Jeffers made his Woking debut featuring in a 1–0 victory over Oxford City in the FA Trophy, before being replaced by Matt Robinson with 13 minutes remaining.

He was released by Yeovil at the end of the 2015–16 season.

=== Non-league ===
On 3 August 2016, Jeffers signed for National League South side Chelmsford City. Jeffers went on to score his first goal against Margate with an impressive bicycle kick also going on to win the 'Man of the Match' award. On 29 October 2016, Jeffers picked up his tenth goal of the campaign when scoring a penalty against Concord Rangers. Over the course of the season, he earned several Man of the Match awards and scored 21 goals, making him one of the highest-scoring players in the division. His contribution helped Chelmsford reach the play-off final for promotion to National League, where they lost to Ebbsfleet United.

After a successful season which saw him score 21 goals, Jeffers signed for National League side Boreham Wood in July 2017. Following a loan spell at Hampton & Richmond Borough in 2018, Jeffers signed for National League North club Brackley Town, scoring once in 12 league appearances for the club. On 28 May 2019, Chelmsford announced the signing of Jeffers, marking his second spell at the club. On 16 June 2020, Chelmsford announced the departure of Jeffers for the second time.

Following his release from Chelmsford, Jeffers joined St Albans City in July 2020. Jeffers had an electric start to the 2021–22 season and after scoring six goals in the month of October, Jeffers was awarded the league's Player of the Month award. On 7 November 2021, Jeffers scored the winner as St Albans City beat League Two leaders Forest Green Rovers in the FA Cup first round. Jeffers departed the club following relegation at the end of the 2024–25 season.

In June 2025, Jeffers joined hometown club Bedford Town following their promotion to the National League North.

On 12 December 2025, Jeffers joined National League South side, Farnborough on a one-month loan.

On 24 January 2026, Jeffers joined National League North club Peterborough Sports on loan for the rest of the season.

== Career statistics ==
As of 13 December 2025

Appearances and goals by club, season and competition
Club	Season	League			FA Cup		League Cup		Other		Total	
Club	Season	Division	Apps	Goals	Apps	Goals	Apps	Goals	Apps	Goals	Apps	Goals
Coventry City	2009–10	Championship	4	0	0	0	1	0	—		5	0
Coventry City	2010–11	Championship	0	0	0	0	0	0	—		0	0
Coventry City	2011–12	Championship	2	0	1	0	0	0	—		3	0
Coventry City	2012–13	League One	0	0	0	0	0	0	0	0	0	0
Coventry City	Total		6	0	1	0	1	0	0	0	8	0
Cheltenham Town (loan)	2010–11	League Two	22	1	1	0	1	1	1 (Note: Appearances in Football League Trophy)	0	25	2
Cambridge United (loan)	2010–11	Conference Premier	2	0	0	0	—		0	0	2	0
Tamworth (loan)	2012–13	Conference Premier	6	0	0	0	—		0	0	6	0
Peterborough United	2013–14	League One	8	1	1	2	0	0	2	0	11	3
Newport County	2013–14	League Two	14	0	0	0	0	0	0	0	14	0
Newport County	2014–15	League Two	21	2	0	0	1	1	0	0	22	3
Newport County	Total		35	2	0	0	1	1	0	0	36	3
Yeovil Town	2015–16	League Two	25	1	3	1	1	0	3	1	32	3
Woking (loan)	2015–16	National League	1	0	—		—		2 (Note: One appearance in FA Trophy, one appearance and one goal in Surrey Senior Cup)	1	3	1
Chelmsford City	2016–17	National League South	39	21	1	0	—		10 (Note: Four appearances and one goal in FA Trophy, three appearances and one goal in Essex Senior Cup, three appearances in National League South play-offs)	2	50	23
Boreham Wood	2017–18	National League	26	3	3	1	—		2 (Note: Appearances in FA Trophy)	1	31	5
Boreham Wood	2018–19	National League	0	0	0	0	—		0	0	0	0
Boreham Wood	Total		26	3	3	1	—		2	1	31	5
Hampton & Richmond Borough (loan)	2017–18	National League South	13	6	—		—		2 (Note: Appearances in National League South play-offs)	0	15	6
Brackley Town	2018–19	National League North	12	1	3	0	—		6 (Note: Four appearances and two goals in FA Trophy, two appearances in Hillier Cup)	2	21	3
Chelmsford City	2019–20	National League South	32	13	1	0	—		6 (Note: Four appearances and two goals in FA Trophy, two appearances and one goal in Essex Senior Cup)	3	39	16
St Albans City	2020–21	National League South	15	9	3	2	—		2	0	20	11
St Albans City	2021–22	National League South	38	27	8	4	—		3	3	49	34
St Albans City	2022–23	National League South	44	27	2	0	—		5 (Note: One appearance in FA Trophy, one appearance and one goal in Herts Senior Cup, three appearances and one goal in National League South play-offs)	2	51	29
St Albans City	2023–24	National League South	44	27	2	0	—		4 (Note: One appearance in FA Trophy, one appearance and four goals in Herts Senior Cup, two appearances and three goals in Herts Charity Cup)	7	50	34
St Albans City	2024–25	National League South	44	8	2	2	—		0	0	46	10
St Albans City	Total		195	98	17	8	—		14	12	216	118
Bedford Town	2025–26	National League North	12	0	1	0	—		1	0	14	0
Farnborough (loan)	2025–26	National League South	1	0	—		—		—		1	0
Career total			425	147	32	12	4	1	49	22	510	182
