= Ryan Bird =

English footballer (born 1987)

Personal information
- Full name: Ryan Bird
- Date of birth: 15 November 1987 (age 38)
- Place of birth: Slough, England
- Height: 6 ft 4 in (1.93 m)
- Positions: Centre-back; forward

Team information
- Current team: Bracknell Town

Youth career
- Burnham

Senior career*
Years	Team	Apps	(Gls)
2004–2013	Burnham	297	(114)
2013–2014	Portsmouth	20	(3)
2013	→ Havant & Waterlooville (loan)	3	(0)
2014	→ Cambridge United (loan)	12	(7)
2014–2015	Cambridge United	24	(6)
2015	→ Hartlepool United (loan)	6	(2)
2015–2016	Yeovil Town	36	(8)
2016–2017	Eastleigh	18	(7)
2017	Newport County	19	(6)
2017–2018	Dover Athletic	48	(20)
2018–2019	Maidenhead United	26	(1)
2019–2023	Slough Town	38	(5)
2022	→ Windsor (loan)	6	(1)
2023–	Bracknell Town	0	(0)
- * Club domestic league appearances and goals as of 15:30, 21 August 2023 (UTC)

Ryan Bird (born 15 November 1987) is an English footballer who plays as a centre-back or forward for Bracknell Town. He played in the Football League for Portsmouth, Cambridge United, Hartlepool United, Yeovil Town and Newport County.

== Career ==
=== Burnham ===
Bird began his footballing career at Burnham's academy, and was promoted to first team in December 2004. His main position was firstly a central defender, but later moved to a more forward role, establishing himself as a striker. As a part-time footballer, he was also an electrician.

In 2010–11, Bird scored 24 goals and finished the season as the club's top scorer. He signed a new contract with Burnham in June 2011. In 2012–13, Bird scored 45 goals in 45 matches (41 league goals in 39 matches) in 2012–13 and was again top scorer as Burnham were crowned champions. At the end of the season, Bird secured two trials, at Wycombe Wanderers and Portsmouth. He was also asked to return in pre-season training.

=== Portsmouth ===
Bird returned to Portsmouth on a trial basis in early June. On 9 July, he scored twice in a friendly match against Havant & Waterlooville. Later that month, Bird signed a one-year professional contract, with the option of a second year.

Bird made his Portsmouth debut on 6 August, in a 1–0 away defeat against AFC Bournemouth. He made his first start on 3 September, in a goalless draw away to Torquay United in the 2013–14 Football League Trophy. On 19 September, Bird joined Havant & Waterlooville on a month's loan. After appearing three times with the "Hawks", he returned to Portsmouth.

Bird scored his first professional goal on 26 October, in a 1–1 away draw against Torquay. He netted twice the following weekend on his first league start, in a 3–2 home win over Exeter City. Bird joined Cambridge United on loan on 24 January, and scored twice in the first 16 minutes of his debut against Dartford the following day. He was instrumental in Cambridge United reaching the final of the FA Trophy final the first time in the club's history, scoring all three of their goals against Grimsby Town in the semi-finals. Bird scored the first goal in the final at Wembley as Cambridge United beat Gosport Borough 4–0.

Bird was recalled by Portsmouth on 27 March, and left the "U's" after scoring nine goals. A groin injury kept him out of Portsmouth's run-in, but the club did exercise the one-year option on his contract, although he was to leave by mutual consent at the end of the summer transfer window.

=== Cambridge United ===
Bird rejoined Cambridge United, now newly promoted to League Two, on 1 September 2014 on a one-year permanent deal. On 25 February 2015 he was loaned to another League Two team, Hartlepool United, for a month. At the end of the 2014–15 season the club did not offer him a new deal when his contract expired.

=== Yeovil Town ===
On 14 July 2015, Bird joined another League Two club, Yeovil Town, on a two-year contract.

=== Eastleigh ===
On 1 August 2016, Bird signed for National League club Eastleigh.

=== Newport County ===
Bird joined Newport County, also of League Two, on 23 January 2017. He made his debut for Newport on 28 January 2017 in a 3–1 league win against Hartlepool United, scoring the opening goal after 15 minutes. Bird was part of the Newport squad that completed the 'Great Escape' with a 2–1 victory at home to Notts County on the final day of the 2016-17 season, which ensured Newport's survival in League Two. He was released at the end of the 2016–17 season after scoring 6 goals in 19 games.

=== Dover Athletic ===
On 27 June 2017, Bird joined National League club Dover Athletic on a one-year contract. He made his debut on 5 August, in an opening-day 1–0 away win against Hartlepool United. He scored his first goal for the club in a 1–0 victory over Wrexham a week later in what was both Bird's and Dover's third game of the season.

Bird finished the season as Dover's top scorer with 16 league goals in 43 starts.

=== Maidenhead United ===
He declined Dover's offer of a second year's contract and instead signed for National League rivals Maidenhead United. Bird scored only one league goal for the Magpies in 26 games before leaving the club after one season.

=== Slough Town ===
On 3 June 2019, Bird signed for the Magpies' local rivals Slough Town, where he reverted to a role in the centre of defence.

== Career statistics ==
As of 28 January 2020.

Appearances and goals by club, season and competition
Club	Season	League			FA Cup		League Cup		Other^{1}		Total	
Club	Season	Division	Apps	Goals	Apps	Goals	Apps	Goals	Apps	Goals	Apps	Goals
Burnham	2009–10	SFL – Division One Central	40	12	4	0	—		9	7	53	19
Burnham	2010–11	SFL – Division One Central	37	19	3	4	—		3	1	43	24
Burnham	2011–12	SFL – Division One Central	40	8	5	0	—		7	2	52	10
Burnham	2012–13	SFL – Division One Central	39	42	1	0	—		5	3	45	45
Burnham	Total^{2}		297	114	13	4	—		30	14	340	133
Portsmouth	2013–14	League Two	18	3	1	0	1	0	2	0	22	3
Portsmouth	2014–15	League Two	2	0	0	0	1	0	0	0	3	0
Portsmouth	Total		20	3	1	0	2	0	2	0	25	3
Havant & Waterlooville (loan)	2013–14	National League South	3	0	0	0	—		0	0	3	0
Cambridge United (loan)	2013–14	Conference Premier	9	5	0	0	—		4	4	13	9
Cambridge United	2014–15	League Two	24	5	4	0	0	0	0	0	28	5
Cambridge United	Total		33	10	4	0	0	0	4	4	41	14
Hartlepool United (loan)	2014–15	League Two	6	2	0	0	0	0	0	0	6	2
Yeovil Town	2015–16	League Two	36	8	3	0	0	0	3	0	43	8
Eastleigh	2016–17	National League	15	3	3	4	—		0	0	18	7
Newport County	2016–17	League Two	19	6	—		0	0	0	0	19	6
Dover Athletic	2017–18	National League	46	16	2	0	—		3	2	51	18
Maidenhead United	2018–19	National League	26	1	2	0	—		3	1	31	2
Slough Town	2019–20	National League South	16	1	3	1	—		2	0	21	2
Career total			517	164	31	9	2	0	47	21	597	194

^{1} Including FA Trophy, Berks & Bucks Senior Cup, Southern League Cup, Wycombe Senior Cup, Southern League play-offs and Football League Trophy.

^{2} Including all matches since 2004.
