= Adam Wilde =

English footballer

Personal information
- Date of birth: 22 May 1979 (age 47)
- Place of birth: Southampton, England
- Position: Midfielder

Youth career
- 1994–1996: Cambridge United

Senior career*
Years	Team	Apps	(Gls)
1996–1999	Cambridge United	4	(0)
1999	→ Kettering Town (loan)	3	(?)
1999–2002	Cambridge City	52	(22)
2002–2004	Worcester City	70	(10)
2004–2006	Weymouth	35	(2)
2006	Salisbury City	12	(4)
2006	St Albans City	10	(0)
2006–2008	Eastbourne Borough	57	(4)
2008	Sutton United	15	(3)
2008	Farnborough	19	(2)
2008–2009	AFC Totton	50	(5)
2009–2016	Gosport Borough	262	(52)
2016–2020	AFC Totton		

International career
2003	England C	1	(0)

Managerial career
- 2016–2020: AFC Totton (player-assistant)
- * Club domestic league appearances and goals

Adam Wilde (born 22 May 1979) is an English retired footballer.

== Career ==
Wilde began his career at Cambridge United, making four appearances for the first team and going out on loan to Kettering Town in 1999.

Following his release by Cambridge United that year, he signed for Cambridge City, where he remained until 2002; he then signed for Worcester City, beginning a two-year stay before another transfer to Weymouth in 2004.

Now an experienced Conference player, Wilde signed for Salisbury City in 2006, however only made 12 appearances, scoring 4 goals, before transferring in the same year to St Albans City. There, Wilde made seven goalless appearances before moving to Eastbourne Borough; at Eastbourne, he settled into the first team and made 57 appearances without scoring a goal.

In 2008, he moved from Eastbourne to Sutton United; once more, Wilde would spend only a matter of months with his new club, scoring 3 goals in 15 matches, before leaving for Farnborough, where he scored twice in 19 appearances.

Following this came a season-long stint at AFC Totton, where Wilde was a regular in the first team making 42 appearances, before he moved to current club Gosport Borough in the summer of 2009.

Wilde made his 100th appearance for Gosport in a 2–0 away win over Abingdon United on 21 February 2012, and scored in his 101st appearance, a 4–1 home win over Yate Town on 25 February 2012.

In November 2016, Wilde left Gosport to return to Totton, combining his ongoing playing career with his first move into coaching as the club's assistant manager. After four years, Wilde decided to step down from the position on 28 March 2020.
