= 2011–12 AFC Bournemouth season =

AFC Bournemouth
2011–12 season
- Chairman: Eddie Mitchell
- Manager: Lee Bradbury (sacked 25 March 2012); Paul Groves
- League One: 11th
- FA Cup: First round
- League Cup: Second round
- Football League Trophy: Quarter-final (South)
- Top goalscorer: League: Wesley Thomas (11); All: Marc Pugh (12)
- Highest home attendance: 8,034 (vs. Charlton Athletic, 3 March 2012)
- Lowest home attendance: 3,681 (vs. Dagenham & Redbridge, 9 August 2011)
- Average home league attendance: 5,881
Home colours	Away colours	Third colours

The 2011–12 AFC Bournemouth season saw the club compete in League One, the FA Cup, the League Cup and the Football League Trophy. In the league the club finished in 11th place.

== Squad statistics ==
=== Appearances and goals ===
No.	Pos	Nat	Player	Total		League One		FA Cup		League Cup		FL Trophy	
No.	Pos	Nat	Player	Apps	Goals	Apps	Goals	Apps	Goals	Apps	Goals	Apps	Goals
1	GK	(England) ENG	Shwan Jalal	6	0	2+1	0	0+0	0	0+0	0	3+0	0
3	DF	(England) ENG	Steve Cook	27	0	26+0	0	0+0	0	0+0	0	1+0	0
4	DF	(England) ENG	Shaun Cooper	31	1	25+1	0	0+1	0	2+0	1	2+0	0
5	DF	(England) ENG	Adam Barrett	28	1	21+0	1	2+0	0	2+0	0	3+0	0
6	MF	(Wales) WAL	Joe Partington	6	0	1+4	0	0+0	0	0+0	0	0+1	0
7	MF	(England) ENG	Marc Pugh	49	12	42+0	8	2+0	0	2+0	1	3+0	3
8	MF	(Ireland) EIR	Harry Arter	39	6	28+6	5	2+0	1	1+0	0	1+1	0
9	FW	(England) ENG	Wesley Thomas	38	11	36+0	11	2+0	0	0+0	0	0+0	0
10	FW	(England) ENG	Charlie Sheringham	7	1	2+4	1	0+0	0	0+0	0	0+1	0
11	DF	(England) ENG	Charlie Daniels	21	2	20+1	2	0+0	0	0+0	0	0+0	0
12	MF	(England) ENG	Wes Fogden	28	3	20+7	3	0+0	0	0+0	0	1+0	0
14	FW	(England) ENG	Lyle Taylor	21	2	7+11	0	0+0	0	2+0	2	1+0	0
15	MF	(England) ENG	Steven Gregory	32	2	23+5	2	0+1	0	1+0	0	2+0	0
16	MF	(Wales) WAL	Shaun MacDonald	26	2	22+3	1	0+0	0	0+0	0	1+0	1
17	MF	(England) ENG	Elliot Ward	1	0	0+0	0	0+0	0	0+1	0	0+0	0
18	DF	(England) ENG	Simon Francis	31	0	29+0	0	2+0	0	0+0	0	0+0	0
19	DF	(England) ENG	Stephen Purches	30	1	20+4	0	2+0	1	0+1	0	3+0	0
20	MF	(England) ENG	Mark Molesley	14	0	4+7	0	0+0	0	2+0	0	0+1	0
21	FW	(England) ENG	Alex Parsons	1	0	0+1	0	0+0	0	0+0	0	0+0	0
22	DF	(England) ENG	Scott Malone	37	5	28+4	5	2+0	0	2+0	0	1+0	0
23	GK	(England) ENG	Daryl Flahavan	48	0	44+0	0	2+0	0	2+0	0	0+0	0
24	FW	(England) ENG	Michael Symes	19	3	7+8	3	2+0	0	0+0	0	1+1	0
25	FW	(England) ENG	Matt Tubbs	7	1	5+2	1	0+0	0	0+0	0	0+0	0
26	DF	(France) FRA	Mathieu Baudry	9	0	5+2	0	0+0	0	0+1	0	0+1	0
28	DF	(Scotland) SCO	Warren Cummings	20	0	10+4	0	2+0	0	0+1	0	3+0	0
29	FW	(England) ENG	Jayden Stockley	14	2	1+9	0	0+0	0	0+2	0	0+2	2
31	DF	(England) ENG	Dan Strugnell	1	0	0+1	0	0+0	0	0+0	0	0+0	0
32	MF	(Ireland) EIR	Donal McDermott	14	1	10+4	1	0+0	0	0+0	0	0+0	0
33	FW	(England) ENG	Steve Fletcher	24	1	2+18	1	0+1	0	1+0	0	1+1	0
36	MF	(Scotland) SCO	Josh Carmichael	1	0	0+1	0	0+0	0	0+0	0	0+0	0
39	MF	(England) ENG	Josh Wakefield	2	0	0+2	0	0+0	0	0+0	0	0+0	0
40	DF	(France) FRA	Stéphane Zubar	25	0	17+5	0	2+0	0	0+0	0	1+0	0
Players appeared for Bournemouth who have left the club:
11	MF	(England) ENG	Liam Feeney	7	1	5+0	0	0+0	0	2+0	1	0+0	0
34	FW	(England) ENG	Danny Ings	1	0	1+0	0	0+0	0	0+0	0	0+0	0
10	FW	(England) ENG	Steve Lovell	4	1	1+1	0	0+0	0	1+0	1	1+0	0
Players who played on loan for Bournemouth and returned to their parent club:
2	DF	(England) ENG	Nathan Byrne	12	0	9+0	0	0+0	0	2+0	0	1+0	0
18	FW	(Wales) WAL	Ryan Doble	8	0	4+3	0	0+0	0	0+0	0	1+0	0
34	DF	(England) ENG	Miles Addison	14	1	14+0	1	0+0	0	0+0	0	0+0	0
11	MF	(Canada) CAN	Jaime Peters	10	0	8+0	0	0+0	0	0+0	0	2+0	0
30	FW	(England) ENG	Zavon Hines	8	1	7+1	1	0+0	0	0+0	0	0+0	0

=== Top scorers ===
Place	Position	Nation	Number	Name	League One	FA Cup	League Cup	FL Trophy	Total
1	MF	(England)	7	Marc Pugh	8	0	3	1	12
2	FW	(England)	9	Wesley Thomas	11	0	0	0	11
3	MF	(Republic of Ireland)	8	Harry Arter	5	1	0	0	6
=	DF	(England)	22	Scott Malone	5	1	0	0	6
5	FW	(England)	24	Michael Symes	3	0	0	0	3
=	MF	(England)	12	Wes Fogden	3	0	0	0	3
7	MF	(England)	15	Steven Gregory	2	0	0	0	2
=	MF	(England)	11	Charlie Daniels	2	0	0	0	2
=	MF	(Wales)	16	Shaun MacDonald	1	0	0	1	2
=	FW	(England)	29	Jayden Stockley	0	0	0	2	2
=	FW	(England)	14	Lyle Taylor	0	0	2	0	2
12	DF	(England)	5	Adam Barrett	1	0	0	0	1
=	FW	(England)	10	Charlie Sheringham	1	0	0	0	1
=	FW	(England)	33	Steve Fletcher	1	0	0	0	1
=	FW	(England)	25	Matt Tubbs	1	0	0	0	1
=	DF	(England)	34	Miles Addison	1	0	0	0	1
=	FW	(England)	30	Zavon Hines	1	0	0	0	1
=	MF	(Republic of Ireland)	32	Donal McDermott	1	0	0	0	1
=	DF	(England)	4	Shaun Cooper	0	0	1	0	1
=	MF	(England)	11	Liam Feeney	0	0	1	0	1
=	FW	(England)	10	Steve Lovell	0	0	1	0	1
=	DF	(England)	19	Stephen Purches	0	1	0	0	1
=	DF	(France)	40	Stéphane Zubar	1	0	0	0	1
				Totals	47	4	6	6	63

=== Disciplinary record ===
Number	Nation	Position	Name	League One		FA Cup		League Cup		FL Trophy		Total	
Number	Nation	Position	Name	Yellow card	Red card	Yellow card	Red card	Yellow card	Red card	Yellow card	Red card	Yellow card	Red card
8	(Republic of Ireland)	MF	Harry Arter	12	0	1	0	0	0	1	0	14	0
40	(France)	DF	Stéphane Zubar	5	0	0	0	0	0	0	0	5	0
20	(England)	MF	Mark Molesley	3	0	0	0	0	0	1	0	4	0
3	(England)	DF	Steve Cook	4	0	0	0	0	0	0	0	4	0
18	(England)	DF	Simon Francis	4	0	0	0	0	0	0	0	4	0
4	(England)	DF	Shaun Cooper	3	0	0	0	0	0	0	0	3	0
10	(England)	FW	Steve Lovell	1	0	0	0	0	0	1	0	2	0
23	(England)	GK	Darryl Flahavan	2	0	0	0	0	0	0	0	2	0
22	(England)	DF	Scott Malone	2	0	0	0	0	0	0	0	2	0
28	(Scotland)	DF	Warren Cummings	0	0	2	0	0	0	0	0	2	0
7	(England)	MF	Marc Pugh	2	0	0	0	0	0	0	0	2	0
9	(England)	FW	Wesley Thomas	2	0	0	0	0	0	0	0	2	0
30	(England)	MF	Zavon Hines	2	0	0	0	0	0	0	0	2	0
5	(England)	DF	Adam Barrett	1	1	0	0	0	0	0	0	1	1
2	(England)	DF	Nathan Byrne	0	0	0	0	1	0	0	0	1	0
15	(England)	MF	Steven Gregory	1	0	0	0	0	0	0	0	1	0
34	(England)	FW	Danny Ings	1	0	0	0	0	0	0	0	1	0
14	(England)	FW	Lyle Taylor	1	0	0	0	0	0	0	0	1	0
26	(France)	DF	Mathieu Baudry	1	0	0	0	0	0	0	0	1	0
11	(Canada)	MF	Jaime Peters	1	0	0	0	0	0	0	0	1	0
12	(England)	MF	Wes Fogden	1	0	0	0	0	0	0	0	1	0
24	(England)	FW	Michael Symes	0	0	1	0	0	0	0	0	1	0
10	(England)	FW	Charlie Sheringham	1	0	0	0	0	0	0	0	1	0
32	(Republic of Ireland)	MF	Donal McDermott	1	0	0	0	0	0	0	0	1	0
11	(England)	DF	Charlie Daniels	1	0	0	0	0	0	0	0	1	0
			Totals	51	1	4	0	2	0	3	0	60	1

== Results ==
=== Pre-season friendlies ===
14 July 2011	Poole Town	4–4	Bournemouth	Tatnam
19:45	Cann 5'; Spetch 12'; Spetch 29'; Joyce 81'		Taylor 53'; Ings 58'; Molesley 60'; Choubani 80'

16 July 2011 EC Group Cup	Bournemouth	1–1 (3–2 p)	Glenn Hoddle Academy	Dean Court
15:00	Lovell 54'		69'
	Penalties
	Arter (penalty scored); Taylor (penalty missed); Cooper (penalty scored); Stockley (penalty missed); Feeney (penalty missed); Purches (penalty scored)		Penalty missed Penalty scored

17 July 2011 EC Group Cup	Bournemouth	0–2	Saarbrücken	Dean Court
15:30			Fuchs 15'; Eggert 79'

23 July 2011	Bournemouth	2–1	Cardiff City	Dean Court
13:00	Malone 8'; Lovell 53'		Taylor 58'

30 July 2011	Bournemouth	3–1	Crystal Palace	Dean Court
15:00	Brillault 63' (o.g.); Barrett 74'; Taylor 87'		Scannell 52'	Attendance: 2,977

1 August 2011	Dorchester Town	0–1	Bournemouth	The Avenue Stadium
19:45			Parsons 85'

=== League One ===
==== Result round by round ====
Round	1	2	3	4	5	6	7	8	9	10	11	12	13	14	15	16	17	18	19	20	21	22	23	24	25	26	27	28	29	30	31	32	33	34	35	36	37	38	39	40	41	42	43	44	45	46
Ground	A	H	H	A	H	A	H	A	A	H	A	H	A	H	A	A	H	A	H	A	H	A	A	H	A	H	H	A	H	A	H	A	H	H	A	H	H	A	A	H	A	H	A	H	A	H
Result	L	W	L	L	L	L	L	W	W	L	D	D	D	L	D	W	W	W	D	W	L	D	W	W	D	W	W	L	W	D	L	L	L	L	L	D	W	L	D	D	L	W	L	D	D	W
Position	23	11	18	20	21	21	23	20	17	18	20	20	20	21	21	18	16	16	15	14	16	15	13	10	9	9	8	9	8	8	8	8	10	12	12	13	10	13	12	12	13	11	12	13	14	11

Updated to match(es) played on 21 January 2012. Source:
A = Away; H = Home; W = Win; D = Draw; L = Loss

==== League table ====
Pos	Team	Pld	W	D	L	GF	GA	GD	Pts
9	Brentford	46	18	13	15	63	52	+11	67
10	Colchester United	46	13	20	13	61	66	−5	59
11	AFC Bournemouth	46	15	13	18	48	52	−4	58
12	Tranmere Rovers	46	14	14	18	49	53	−4	56
13	Hartlepool United	46	14	14	18	50	55	−5	56

Updated to match(es) played on 5 May 2012. Source: BBC Sport
Rules for classification: 1) Points; 2) Goal difference; 3) Number of goals scored

==== Results ====
6 August 2011 1	Charlton Athletic	3–0	Bournemouth	The Valley
15:00	Stephens 23', 51'; Jackson 77' (pen.)			Attendance: 16,111

13 August 2011 2	Bournemouth	2–0	Sheffield Wednesday	Seward Stadium
15:00	Barrett 38'; Arter 83'			Attendance: 6,901

16 August 2011 3	Bournemouth	1–3	Stevenage	Seward Stadium
19:45	Arter 47'		Reid 43'; Mousinho 65' (pen.); Beardsley 90+1'	Attendance: 5,574

20 August 2011 4	Carlisle United	2–1	Bournemouth	Brunton Park
15:00	Taiwo 49'; Byrne 77' (o.g.)		Arter 61' (pen.)	Attendance: 4,422

27 August 2011 5	Bournemouth	0–2	Walsall	Seward Stadium
15:00			Jaynes 35' (pen.); Jaynes 78'	Attendance: 9,917

3 September 2011 6	Notts County	3–1	Bournemouth	Meadow Lane
15:00	L. Hughes 1'; Pearce 78'; Montano 86'		Pugh 71'	Attendance: 5,510

10 September 2011 7	Bournemouth	0–3	Chesterfield	Seward Stadium
15:00			Mendy 33'; Westcarr 59'; Clarke 71'	Attendance: 4,989

13 September 2011 8	Leyton Orient	1–3	Bournemouth	Brisbane Road
15:00	Baudry 23' (o.g.)		Arter 20' (pen.); Thomas 74'; Pugh 81'	Attendance: 3,258

17 September 2011 9	Exeter City	0–2	Bournemouth	St James Park
15:00			Thomas 38'; Duffy 90' (o.g.)	Attendance: 4,593

24 September 2011 10	Bournemouth	1–2	Hartlepool United	Seward Stadium
15:00	Gregory 37'		Solano 42'; Horwood 87'	Attendance: 5,275

1 October 2011 11	Tranmere Rovers	0–0	Bournemouth	Prenton Park
15:00				Attendance: 4,179

8 October 2011 12	Bournemouth	1–1	Rochdale	Seward Stadium
15:00	Symes 68' (pen.)		Jones 30' (pen.)	Attendance: 5,345

15 October 2011 13	MK Dons	2–2	Bournemouth	Stadium mk
15:00	Balanta 42'; Morrison 80'		Thomas 61', 73'	Attendance: 8,927

22 October 2011 14	Bournemouth	1–2	Bury	Seward Stadium
15:00	Pugh 41'		Coke 45'; Bishop 53'	Attendance: 6,122

25 October 2011 15	Colchester United	1–1	Bournemouth	Colchester Community Stadium
19:45	Zubar 72' (o.g.)		Thomas 1'	Attendance: 3,444

29 October 2011 16	Preston North End	1–3	Bournemouth	Deepdale
15:00	Tsoumou 29'		Thomas 48'; Malone 57'; Pugh 68'	Attendance: 10,185

5 November 2011 17	Bournemouth	2–0	Scunthorpe United	Seward Stadium
15:00	Malone 20'; Thomas 73'			Attendance: 5,478

19 November 2011 18	Wycombe Wanderers	0–1	Bournemouth	Adams Park
15:00			Pugh 23'	Attendance: 5,350

26 November 2011 19	Bournemouth	0–0	Oldham Athletic	Seward Stadium
15:00				Attendance: 5,478

10 December 2011 20	Huddersfield Town	0–1	Bournemouth	Galpharm Stadium
15:00			Arter 19'	Attendance: 13,930

17 December 2011 21	Bournemouth	0–2	Sheffield United	Seward Stadium
15:00			Barrett 5' (o.g.); Cook 77' (o.g.)	Attendance: 7,260

26 December 2011 22	Brentford	1–1	Bournemouth	Griffin Park
15:00	Legge 90+4'		Sheringham 19'	Attendance: 6,338

31 December 2011 23	Yeovil Town	1–3	Bournemouth	Huish Park
13:00	Huntington 66'		Gregory 6'; Fogden 26'; Daniels 74'	Attendance: 5,632

2 January 2012 24	Bournemouth	2–0	Wycombe Wanderers	Seward Stadium
15:00	Thomas 27'; Symes 50'			Attendance: 7,202

7 January 2012 25	Walsall	2–2	Bournemouth	Bescot Stadium
15:00	Macken 15'; Butler 44'		Symes 62' (pen.); Fletcher 90+3'	Attendance: 3,658

14 January 2012 26	Bournemouth	2–1	Notts County	Seward Stadium
15:00	Thomas 21'; Fogden 83'		Bencherif 5'	Attendance: 6,529

21 January 2012 27	Bournemouth	2–1	Tranmere Rovers	Seward Stadium
15:00	Thomas 18'; Pugh 30'		Devaney 4'	Attendance: 5,807

27 January 2012 28	Chesterfield	1–0	Bournemouth	B2net Stadium
19:45	Ridehalgh 55'			Attendance: 6,958

7 February 2012 29	Bournemouth	2–0	Exeter City	Seward Stadium
19:45	Tubbs 72'; Malone 78'			Attendance: 5,497

11 February 2012 30	Hartlepool United	0–0	Bournemouth	Victoria Park
15:00				Attendance: 4,548

14 February 2012 31	Bournemouth	1–2	Leyton Orient	Seward Stadium
19:45	Pugh 34'		Lisbie 17'; Smith 75'	Attendance: 5,412

18 February 2012 32	Rochdale	1–0	Bournemouth	Spotland Stadium
15:00	Jones 90+2' (pen.)			Attendance: 2,499

25 February 2012 33	Bournemouth	0–1	MK Dons	Seward Stadium
15:00			Doumbe 32'	Attendance: 6,419

3 March 2012 34	Bournemouth	0–1	Charlton Athletic	Seward Stadium
15:00			Kermorgant 90+2'	Attendance: 8,034

10 March 2012 35	Sheffield Wednesday	3–0	Bournemouth	Hillsborough Stadium
15:00	Batth 4'; Addison 9' (o.g.); Antonio 10'			Attendance: 19,416

17 March 2012 36	Bournemouth	1–1	Carlisle United	Seward Stadium
15:00	Addison 83'		Miller 4'	Attendance: 5,240

20 March 2012 37	Bournemouth	1–0	Brentford	Seward Stadium
19:45	Fogden 45'			Attendance: 4,563

24 March 2012 38	Oldham Athletic	1–0	Bournemouth	Boundary Park
15:00	Taylor 52'			Attendance: 4,459

27 March 2012 39	Stevenage	2–2	Bournemouth	Lamex Stadium
19:45	Freeman 38'; Bostwick 45+1'		Thomas 18'; Malone 36'	Attendance: 2,550

31 March 2012 40	Bournemouth	0–0	Yeovil	Seward Stadium
15:00				Attendance: 6,170

7 April 2012 41	Sheffield United	2–1	Bournemouth	Bramall Lane
15:00	Evans 34'; Cresswell 50'		Hines 67'	Attendance: 18,817

9 April 2012 42	Bournemouth	2–0	Huddersfield Town	Seward Stadium
15:00	Malone 72'; Pugh 82'			Attendance: 5,500

14 April 2012 43	Bury	1–0	Bournemouth	Gigg Lane
15:00	Grella 10'			Attendance: 2,729

21 April 2012 44	Bournemouth	1–1	Colchester United	Seward Stadium
15:00	Macdonald 11'		Eastman 84'	Attendance: 5,109

28 April 2012 45	Scunthorpe United	1–1	Bournemouth	Glanford Park
15:00	Thompson 79'		McDermott 42'	Attendance: 4,422

5 May 2012 46	Bournemouth	1–0	Preston North End	Seward Stadium
15:00	Daniels 51' (pen.)			Attendance: 6,267

=== FA Cup ===
12 November 2011 R1	Bournemouth	3–3	Gillingham	Seward Stadium
15.00	Purches 20'; Zubar 59'; Malone 60'	Report	Payne 37'; Jackman 71'; Kedwell 90'	Attendance: 4,282

22 November 2011 Reply	Gillingham	3–2	AFC Bournemouth	MEMS Priestfield Stadium
19:45 GMT	Weston 21'; Richards 75'; S. Payne 82'	Report	Frampton 55' (o.g.); Arter 90+1'	Attendance: 4,321; Referee: Fred Graham

=== League Cup ===
9 August 2011 Round 1	Bournemouth	5–0	Dagenham & Redbridge	Seward Stadium
19:45	Pugh 32'; Cooper 35'; Feeney 57'; Taylor 88', 90+3'			Attendance: 3,681

23 August 2011 Round 2	Bournemouth	1–4	West Bromwich Albion	Seward Stadium
19:45	Lovell 48'		Thomas 7'; Fortune 42', 78'; Cox 53'	Attendance: 6,911

=== Football League Trophy ===
30 August 2011 Round 1	Bournemouth	4–1	Hereford United	Seward Stadium
19:45	Pugh 39'; Stockley 66', 77'; MacDonald 84'		Barkhuizen 12'	Attendance: 2,489

4 October 2011 Round 2	Bournemouth	3–2	Yeovil Town	Seward Stadium
19:45	Pugh 16', 25'; N'Gala 30' (o.g.)		MacLean 63'; Ehmer 88'	Attendance: 3,265

8 November 2011 Southern QF	Brentford	6–0	Bournemouth	Griffin Park
19:45	Saunders 5'; Grella 24', 48', 82', 84'; Logan 77'			Attendance: 3,015

== Transfers ==
Players transferred in
Date	Pos.	Name	From	Fee	Ref.
28 June 2011	GK	(England) Darryl Flahavan	(England) Portsmouth	Free Transfer	
1 July 2011	MF	(England) Steven Gregory	(England) AFC Wimbledon	£50,000	
6 July 2011	DF	(England) Adam Barrett	(England) Crystal Palace	Undisclosed Fee	
26 August 2011	DF	(England) Gary Bowles	(England) Dorchester Town	Undisclosed Fee	
26 August 2011	MF	(Wales) Shaun MacDonald	(Wales) Swansea City	£80,000	
26 August 2011	DF	(Guadeloupe) Stéphane Zubar	(England) Plymouth Argyle	Free	
20 September 2011	FW	(England) Charlie Sheringham	(England) Dartford	£25,000	
1 January 2012	DF	(England) Charlie Daniels	(England) Leyton Orient	£200,000	
1 January 2012	FW	(England) Wesley Thomas	(England) Crawley Town	£200,000	
4 January 2012	DF	(England) Steve Cook	(England) Brighton & Hove Albion	£150,000	
4 January 2012	DF	(England) Simon Francis	(England) Charlton Athletic	Free	
6 January 2012	MF	(England) Wes Fogden	(England) Havant & Waterlooville	Free	
30 January 2012	FW	(England) Matt Tubbs	(England) Crawley Town	£800,000	
30 January 2012	MF	(Republic of Ireland) Donal McDermott	(England) Huddersfield Town	£175,000	
Players loaned in
Date from	Pos.	Name	From	Date to	Ref.
18 July 2011	DF	(England) Scott Malone	(England) Wolverhampton Wanderers	January 2012	
28 July 2011	MF	(England) Nathan Byrne	(England) Tottenham Hotspur	May 2012	
11 August 2011	FW	(Wales) Ryan Doble	(England) Southampton	10 October 2011	
9 September 2011	FW	(England) Wesley Thomas	(England) Crawley Town	1 January 2012	
23 September 2011	DF	(Canada) Jaime Peters	(England) Ipswich Town	23 November 2011	
6 October 2011	FW	(England) Wes Fogden	(England) Havant & Waterlooville	6 January 2012	
27 October 2011	DF	(England) Steve Cook	(England) Brighton & Hove Albion	1 January 2012	
7 November 2011	DF	(England) Simon Francis	(England) Charlton Athletic	4 January 2012	
24 November 2011	DF	(England) Charlie Daniels	(England) Leyton Orient	1 January 2012	
21 February 2012	DF	(England) Miles Addison	(England) Derby County	End of season	
22 March 2012	FW	(England) Zavon Hines	(England) Burnley	End of season	
Players loaned out
Date from	Pos.	Name	To	Date to	Ref.
19 August 2011	GK	(England) Dan Thomas	(England) Welling United	18 September 2012	
19 August 2011	DF	(England) Tim Stephenson	(England) Weymouth	18 September 2012	
26 August 2011	DF	(England) Gary Bowles	(England) Dorchester Town	End of season	
31 August 2011	DF	(England) Mitchell Nelson	(England) Lincoln City	1 October 2011	
4 November 2011	FW	(England) Jayden Stockley	(England) Accrington Stanley	9 January 2012	
6 January 2012	GK	(England) Dan Thomas	(England) A.F.C. Totton	30 January 2012	
31 January 2012	FW	(England) Michael Symes	(England) Rochdale	End of season	
9 February 2012	FW	(England) Lyle Taylor	(England) Hereford United	9 March 2012	
1 March 2012	DF	(Scotland) Warren Cummings	(England) Crawley Town	End of season	
12 March 2012	DF	(France) Mathieu Baudry	(England) Dagenham & Redbridge	End of season	
22 March 2012	MF	(England) Mark Molesley	(England) Aldershot Town	End of season	
22 March 2012	FW	(England) Steve Fletcher	(England) Plymouth Argyle	30 April 2012	
Players transferred out
Date	Pos.	Name	To	Fee	Ref.
24 June 2011	DF	(England) Jason Pearce	(England) Portsmouth	£400,000	
1 July 2011	DF	(Wales) Rhoys Wiggins	(England) Charlton Athletic	£250,000	
1 August 2011	MF	(England) Anton Robinson	(England) Huddersfield Town	Undisclosed Fee	
15 August 2011	FW	(England) Danny Ings	(England) Burnley	£1.3m	
31 August 2011	MF	(England) Liam Feeney	(England) Millwall	£200,000	
Players released
Date	Pos.	Name	Subsequent club	Join date	Ref.
25 May 2011	MF	(England) Danny Hollands	(England) Charlton Athletic	1 July 2011 (Bosman)	
28 June 2011	FW	(England) Ben Williamson	(England) Hyde	1 July 2011 (Bosman)	
19 July 2011	DF	(England) Ryan Garry	Retired		
1 September 2011	FW	(England) Steve Lovell	Retired		
16 December 2011	DF	(England) Mitchell Nelson	(England) Eastleigh	16 December 2011	
4 January 2012	DF	(England) Tim Stephenson	Unattached		
16 March 2012	GK	(England) Dan Thomas	(England) Havant & Waterlooville	16 March 2012	

== Awards ==
End of Season Awards	Winner
Supporters Player of the Season	Marc Pugh
Junior Cherries Player of the Season	Shaun MacDonald
