= Harry Arter =

Ireland international footballer (born 1989)

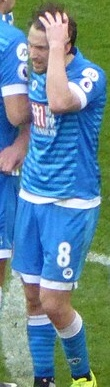
- Arter playing for AFC Bournemouth in 2017

Personal information
- Full name: Harry Nicholas Arter
- Date of birth: 28 December 1989 (age 36)
- Place of birth: Sidcup, England
- Height: 5 ft 9 in (1.76 m)
- Positions: Central midfielder; defensive midfielder

Youth career
- –2007: Charlton Athletic

Senior career*
| Years | Team | Apps | (Gls) |
| 2007–2009 | Charlton Athletic | 0 | (0) |
| 2008 | → Staines Town (loan) | 4 | (0) |
| 2009 | → Welling United (loan) | 6 | (0) |
| 2009–2010 | Woking | 36 | (5) |
| 2010–2020 | AFC Bournemouth | 232 | (28) |
| 2011 | → Carlisle United (loan) | 5 | (1) |
| 2018–2019 | → Cardiff City (loan) | 25 | (0) |
| 2019–2020 | → Fulham (loan) | 28 | (2) |
| 2020–2024 | Nottingham Forest | 13 | (0) |
| 2021–2022 | → Charlton Athletic (loan) | 4 | (0) |
| 2022 | → Notts County (loan) | 9 | (0) |
| 2024–2025 | Precision | 6 | (0) |

International career^{‡}
| 2006 | Republic of Ireland U17 | 4 | (0) |
| 2006–2007 | Republic of Ireland U19 | 7 | (0) |
| 2015–2021 | Republic of Ireland | 19 | (0) |
- * Club domestic league appearances and goals as of 08:06, 2 May 2025 (UTC) ‡ National team caps and goals as of 22:10, 12 October 2021 (UTC)

Harry Nicholas Arter (born 28 December 1989) is a professional footballer who plays as a central or defensive midfielder.

He began his career at Charlton Athletic, progressing through the club's youth academy before making his professional debut in 2007. He was loaned to non-League clubs Staines Town and Welling United before being released, subsequently joining Woking. After one season at Woking, he returned to The Football League with Bournemouth, becoming a first team regular following a loan to Carlisle United in 2011. He contributed to Bournemouth's promotion to the Championship in 2013, and to the Premier League two years later.

Born and raised in England, Arter represents the Republic of Ireland internationally. He played for the nation at under-17 and under-19 level, and made his senior debut in June 2015.

== Early life ==
Born in Sidcup, Greater London, to parents Terry and Linda Arter, he was raised in the nearby area of Eltham. He has three brothers, Benji, Daniel and Paddy and a sister, Carly.

== Club career ==
=== Charlton Athletic ===
He began his career with Charlton Athletic, joining the club's youth system at the age of seven. Turning down offers from other clubs to remain with Charlton, he made his professional debut, and only appearance for the club, on 25 September 2007 in the third round of the League Cup, away to Luton Town. He came on as an 86th-minute substitute for Svetoslav Todorov as Charlton lost 3–1 after extra time. Soon after, he was diagnosed with chronic tendonitis in his achilles which eventually ruptured, leading to almost a year out of action. On his return to fitness, he struggled to break into the first team under new manager Phil Parkinson. In the 2008–09 season, Arter immediately clashed with Parkinson, accusing the manager of "belittling" him by sending him for a trial with non-League club Staines Town prior to a short loan spell.

He later had a loan spell with Welling United as Charlton suffered relegation to League One and Arter was subsequently released by Parkinson as part of an effort to reduce costs at the club. Arter later expressed his disappointment with the decision, stating "The money I was asking for [...] was nothing. I would have taken anything to stay at the time, so it wasn't down to finance, it was him (Parkinson) not liking me as a footballer." Despite his release, he was allowed to train with Charlton's youth team by coach Steve Avory who had worked with Arter for several years in his youth career. Arter later undertook unsuccessful trials with Gillingham and Ipswich Town and even offered to remain with Charlton without pay but was rejected by Parkinson.

=== Woking ===
On 2 June 2009, Arter signed for Conference South club Woking on a one-year contract along with his former Charlton teammate Aswad Thomas, after being recommended by assistant manager Jimmy Dack who had worked with Arter previously at Welling. Arter had been waiting for a firm offer to join AFC Wimbledon but accepted Woking's offer after Wimbledon failed to call back. He made his debut for the club in the opening day of the 2009–10 season, during a 2–1 victory over his former team Welling United. On 24 October 2009, Arter scored a hat-trick for the club during a 5–0 win over Hendon in the FA Cup.

At the end of the 2009–10 season, it was well documented that Arter would be leaving Woking, with several Football League clubs chasing Arter. Woking's website soon confirmed that Arter had agreed to sign for AFC Bournemouth with the fee to be decided by an FA tribunal, as the two clubs could not agree a transfer fee, with Woking hoping to receive around £30,000 for the move after rejecting Bournemouth's initial £2,000 offer. Arter later described how he had planned to give up football if his season with Woking had failed.

=== AFC Bournemouth ===
==== 2010–11 ====
On 7 June 2010, Arter joined League One club Bournemouth for an undisclosed fee, later stated as £4,000, signed by Eddie Howe. The club had moved to sign Arter after impressing assistant manager Jason Tindall during a scouting assignment, with a previous transfer embargo having been recently lifted. Two months later, after impressing during the club's preseason fixtures, he made his debut in their first match of the season, away to his former team Charlton. He was booked in the first half for a foul on Akpo Sodje and substituted at half time for Michael Symes as Bournemouth lost 1–0. He was subsequently dropped from the first team, not making another start in the league for Bournemouth until November, having also been hampered by a hernia. The hernia eventually required surgery, resulting in Arter being ruled out for a month.

Having fallen out of favour under new manager Lee Bradbury, despite being handed a new three-year contract following his appointment, on 4 March 2011, Arter went on a one-month loan to fellow League One club Carlisle United in order to gain first team experience. The next day he made his debut for the club, replacing Liam Noble for the last 30 minutes away to Brighton & Hove Albion. He scored an extra-time equaliser, the first of his professional career, but a minute later Liam Bridcutt scored Brighton's winner in a 4–3 victory. He made four further appearances for the club during his loan spell before returning to Bournemouth.

==== 2011–12 ====
The sales of Danny Hollands and Anton Robinson during the 2011 summer transfer window allowed Arter to gain increased first team experience with Bournemouth. On 13 August 2011, Arter replaced Mark Molesley in the 66th minute of a match against Sheffield Wednesday at Dean Court, and 17 minutes later confirmed a 2–0 win with his first goal for the club. going on to score in his two following appearances, a 3–1 defeat to Stevenage and a 2–1 victory over his former team Carlisle. His performances attracted the attention of several Championship clubs and Bournemouth rejected enquiries from two clubs, before handing him an improved contract.

However, despite an upturn in form, Arter suffered from a poor disciplinary record, serving a one-match suspension after collecting five bookings within the first two months of the season and accumulating nine bookings by November. His tally was the worst in League One and led him to seek advice from a sports psychologist in order to control his anger, with the majority of his bookings being due to dissent towards match officials. He eventually received a two-match ban for receiving his tenth booking of the season a month later and a further three-match ban later in the season for his fifteenth booking. After Bradbury was dismissed and replaced by former youth team manager Paul Groves, Arter stated that he hoped to be used in a more attacking role after claiming that Bradbury had played him "too defensively." Overall, he scored 5 goals in 34 league matches during the season as Bournemouth finished in 11th place.

==== 2012–13 ====
On 25 August 2012, in his fourth appearance of the 2012–13 season Arter was sent off after 26 minutes of Bournemouth's 1–1 draw at Preston North End for two bookable offences. Following the dismissal, he issued a public apology for the sending off and blamed his "immaturity." Manager Groves held talks with Arter in an attempt to curb his disciplinary problems, and, despite accepting his behaviour, Arter also claimed that he was being unfairly treated by referees due to his reputation, commenting "I feel I am being highlighted before a game. [...] I have earned that reputation so it is my fault. But, in another way, it is unfair on me."

On 20 October 2012, in Eddie Howe's first match back in charge following his reappointment as manager, Arter scored in a 3–1 home win over Tranmere Rovers. One of Howe's first decisions on his return was to sign Arter to an extended contract, set to run until 2015 with Bournemouth retaining the option for a further year. Following Howe's return, Arter became a key figure in the team as the club embarked on a fifteen match unbeaten run that moved them into promotion contention, eventually losing 1–0 to Walsall in January 2013. Despite receiving a two-match ban for accumulating ten bookings for the second consecutive season, manager Howe praised Arter and stated his belief that he had "matured" as a player and his bookings were largely due to his combative nature on the field rather than dissent.

Altogether, he scored 8 goals in 37 league matches, including in a 3–1 win in the penultimate match of the season against Carlisle on 20 April 2013, which secured Bournemouth promotion to the Championship. Arter described his goal as "the most important goal I have ever scored and one that will probably stick with me for the rest of my life."

==== 2013–14 ====
Following Bournemouth's promotion to the Championship, they began their campaign against Arter's former team Charlton for the third time in four seasons, winning 2–1 on the opening day of the season as Arter recorded a victory over his former team for the first time in his career. Having featured regularly during the first month of the season, he was ruled out until October through injury before making his return in a 5–2 victory over Millwall where he scored his first goal in the second tier.

Arter's season ended on 5 April 2014 when he received a straight red card following a foul on Junior Hoilett during a 2–1 victory over Queens Park Rangers, gaining a three-match ban. He helped the team to a tenth-placed finish in their first season in the Championship, the highest placed finish and points total in the club's history, and credited Howe with bringing the best out of the club's players and improving his own game in "leaps and bounds".

==== 2014–15 ====
Despite their record finish, Arter was keen to push for promotion at the start of the 2014–15 season and claimed he would see the season as a failure if the club did not at least reach the playoffs. On 25 October 2014, Arter played as Bournemouth beat Birmingham City 8–0 away to set a club record win. Throughout the season Arter and midfielder Andrew Surman formed a strong partnership, with Arter more the attacking and Surman the more defensive of the two, with Arter praising his midfield teammate – describing him as "He's a top player and one we're fortunate to have." Arter was named the Professional Footballers' Association (PFA) Player of the Month award for December 2014, after scoring in all five matches he played during the month but lost out to Ipswich Town forward Daryl Murphy in the Football League equivalent. He was rewarded for his form by signing an improved three-and-a-half-year contract with the club.

Arter became known for his left footed strikes from range, notably scoring the second goal in the 3–0 home victory over promotion rivals Middlesbrough and first goal in the 1–1 away draw against second placed Watford. On 27 April 2015, Arter played in the 3–0 home victory against Bolton Wanderers, the win all but sealed Bournemouth's promotion to the Premier League. Five days later, he scored the second goal in the 3–0 away win against his former club Charlton, the win fully sealed promotion and, thanks to Watford drawing their last match in injury time, the Championship title. This was the first time Bournemouth had been promoted into England's top flight in the club's 125-year history.

Arter was one of Bournemouth's prominent players in the season, contributing 9 goals from 43 matches, and subsequently was voted Supporters' Player of the Season and named PFA Championship Player of the Season.

==== 2015–16 ====
Following the end of their Championship winning season, Arter sustained a groin injury while on international duty that made him a major doubt for the club's opening fixtures in the Premier League. After being advised to rest for several weeks, Arter was hopeful of returning in time, but was eventually forced to undergo surgery on the problem after visiting a specialist in Germany. He eventually made his first team return on 28 October 2015, playing in the club's 1–0 defeat to Liverpool in the League Cup. He made his Premier League debut four days later, on 1 November 2015, as he played 73 minutes in a 2–0 defeat to Southampton, and his return was credited with helping the club achieve an upturn in fortunes.

On 12 December 2015, Arter played in a 2–1 victory over Manchester United, just days after his wife had given birth to their stillborn daughter. Despite his grief, he met with manager Howe prior to the match, telling him "I'm training today and playing tomorrow if you want to select me. I want to play so bad." He later admitted that he was in a "bad way" mentally before the match and wept in the changing room toilets prior to kick-off. He produced a performance that saw him named man of the match afterwards, being substituted in the final stages of the match after being overcome with emotion and embracing Howe on the touchline. After the match, Howe praised Arter, stating that he had "real strength to keep his emotions in check." Arter was also given a standing ovation by his Bournemouth teammates in the dressing room.

Further injury problems restricted Arter's appearances, suffering from a persistent achilles issue, and he appeared in just four matches in the final three months of the season. He attempted to play on with the injury but struggled to maintain fitness and admitted that he had returned to action too early. In his first season in the first tier, he appeared in 21 league matches for the club as they finished in 16th position.

==== Later years ====
Prior to the start of the 2016–17 season, Arter signed a new three-year deal with Bournemouth, set to run until 2019, and called on the squad to aim to improve on the previous season and not simply target avoiding relegation. After suffering a 3–1 defeat to Manchester United in the opening match, Arter was sent off in the following match, a 1–0 defeat to West Ham United, after receiving a second yellow card for fouling Cheikhou Kouyate. His first yellow was received for dissent after Premier League officials announced stricter rules on any show of disrespect towards match officials. Despite his sending off, Arter stated "The manager has said if I change the way I play then I become a different player. I just need to cut out those silly bookings chatting back to referees."

He started Bournemouth's first 21 league matches of the season and earned praise for his form but was dropped from the team for a match against Watford in January 2017. He stated that he "hated" being left out of the squad but was restored to the starting line-up for the following match, scoring his first goal of the season in a 6–3 defeat to Everton. Arter made 35 appearances for Bournemouth during the 2016–17 season, being rewarded with a new three-year contract set to run until 2021 at the end of the year. Manager Howe praised Arter for improving his disciplinary record, stating that, although he "still had that fiery streak," he had "matured" as a player.

During pre-season for the 2017–18 season, Arter was monitored by Bournemouth over fitness concerns after playing the majority of the previous season with an achilles injury. On 19 August 2017, Arter received media attention after controversially tricking Nathaniel Chalobah into leaving a free shot on goal by pretending to be one of Chalobah's teammates in a 2–0 home defeat to Watford. Having started all of his club's opening five matches, he suffered an injury and after returning to the squad following an international break he was unable to regain his first team place. He made 13 appearances over the course of the season, his final start coming during a 2–2 draw with Brighton & Hove Albion on New Year's Day. Despite his lack of playing time, manager Howe stated that Arter was not for sale after he was heavily linked with a transfer to rival Premier League club West Ham United, with Arter declaring he was "100% committed" to Bournemouth.

==== 2018–20 loan moves ====
Despite stating his desire to remain with Bournemouth in an attempt to force his way back into the first team, on 9 August 2018, Arter joined newly promoted Premier League club Cardiff City on loan for the 2018–19 season, rejecting a similar offer from Watford. Bournemouth manager Howe admitted that he had taken the decision "reluctantly" as Arter was determined to play first team football. After being ineligible to play against his parent club Bournemouth on the opening day of the season, Arter made his debut for Cardiff in a 0–0 draw with Newcastle United on 18 August 2018. His early performances for the club earned praise from Cardiff manager Neil Warnock who described Arter's contribution as "vital".

Arter joined Fulham on a season long loan in August 2019, with the option to make the move permanent. He scored his first league goal for Fulham on 30 June 2020 against QPR in a 1–2 away win.

=== Nottingham Forest ===
On 22 September 2020, Arter signed on a three-year deal with EFL Championship side Nottingham Forest for an undisclosed fee. Arter quickly fell out of favour at Forest, and by January 2021 the club were already open to allowing Arter to leave. At the end of the 2020–21 season, Arter was told that he was not in manager Chris Hughton's plans and was free to leave the club. However, Nottingham Forest's promotion to the Premier League in the 2021–22 season triggered a clause which extended Arter's contract by an additional year, until 2024.

On 5 June 2024, it was confirmed that Arter would leave Nottingham Forest at the conclusion of his contract.

==== Charlton Athletic (loan) ====
On 31 August 2021, Arter joined Charlton Athletic on loan for the 2021–22 season, returning to the club where he had made his senior debut. On 4 January 2022, Arter opted to return to his parent club.

==== Notts County (loan) ====
On 16 March 2022, Arter joined National League side Notts County on loan until May 2022. On 4 May 2022, after nine appearances, Arter returned to Nottingham Forest.

=== Precision Football ===
In September 2024, Arter joined UAE Second Division League club Precision Football.

== International career ==
Arter played for the Republic of Ireland under-15, under-17 and under-19 teams, being eligible through his Sligo-born grandparents.

In February 2015, Republic of Ireland manager Martin O'Neill said that Arter was on his radar and could be called up to the squad for the UEFA Euro 2016 qualifying match against Poland. He earned his first call-up for that match on 12 March, following what O'Neill described as a "very good season", but did not play in it. He made his senior debut on 7 June 2015, as a 63rd-minute substitute for Glenn Whelan in a 0–0 draw in a friendly against England at the Aviva Stadium. He made his full international debut against the Netherlands in a 1–1 draw in Dublin on 27 May 2016, in which he was awarded man of the match. However, he was ultimately left out of Ireland's squad for UEFA Euro 2016. Arter made his senior competitive debut for the Republic of Ireland in a 1–0 away win over Austria on 12 November 2016 in a World Cup qualifying match, having made himself unavailable for the previous month's matches against Georgia and Moldova.

In September 2018, Arter made himself unavailable for selection for two matches after a clash with assistant manager Roy Keane. After sitting out several training sessions due to reporting various minor niggles to medical staff, Arter was confronted by Keane which led to Arter walking out of the team training session. Arter returned to the Republic of Ireland team for the UEFA Nations League match against Denmark on 13 October 2018.

== Personal life ==
Arter is the brother-in-law of former England player and former Burnley F.C. manager Scott Parker, who is married to Arter's sister Carly. They both began their careers at Charlton. Arter has frequently cited Parker as a positive influence in his life. When Arter was released by Charlton and struggled to find a new club, Parker let him live in his house and paid him to do odd jobs in order to earn money. Arter played under Parker at Fulham during the 2019–20 season which he spent on loan at the club.

In December 2015, Arter and his partner, Rachel, suffered a family tragedy when their daughter died at birth. Bournemouth manager Eddie Howe paid tribute to Arter following a 2–1 win over Manchester United on 12 December. Howe dedicated the win to Arter and said it had been "a hugely emotional week for him." In October 2016, Arter shared the news of his partner being pregnant again. On 17 February 2017, she gave birth to a baby girl, and called her Raine.

== Career statistics ==
=== Club ===
As of 2 May 2022

Appearances and goals by club, season and competition
| Club | Season | League | | | FA Cup | | League Cup | | Other | | Total | |
| Club | Season | Division | Apps | Goals | Apps | Goals | Apps | Goals | Apps | Goals | Apps | Goals |
|---|---|---|---|---|---|---|---|---|---|---|---|---|
| Charlton Athletic | 2007–08 | Championship | 0 | 0 | 0 | 0 | 1 | 0 | — | | 1 | 0 |
| Charlton Athletic | 2008–09 | Championship | 0 | 0 | 0 | 0 | 0 | 0 | — | | 0 | 0 |
| Charlton Athletic | Total | | 0 | 0 | 0 | 0 | 1 | 0 | 0 | 0 | 1 | 0 |
| Staines Town (loan) | 2008–09 | Isthmian League Premier Division | 4 | 0 | — | | — | | 2 (Note: One appearance and one goal in Isthmian League Cup, one appearance in Middlesex Senior Cup) | 1 | 6 | 1 |
| Welling United (loan) | 2008–09 | Conference South | 6 | 0 | — | | — | | — | | 6 | 0 |
| Woking | 2009–10 | Conference South | 36 | 5 | 5 | 3 | — | | 4 (Note: Three appearances and one goal in FA Trophy, one appearance in Surrey Senior Cup) | 1 | 45 | 9 |
| AFC Bournemouth | 2010–11 | League One | 18 | 0 | 1 | 0 | 0 | 0 | 1 (Note: Appearance(s) in Football League Trophy) | 0 | 20 | 0 |
| AFC Bournemouth | 2011–12 | League One | 34 | 5 | 2 | 1 | 1 | 0 | 2 | 0 | 39 | 6 |
| AFC Bournemouth | 2012–13 | League One | 37 | 8 | 3 | 0 | 1 | 0 | 1 | 0 | 42 | 8 |
| AFC Bournemouth | 2013–14 | Championship | 31 | 3 | 2 | 0 | 1 | 0 | — | | 34 | 3 |
| AFC Bournemouth | 2014–15 | Championship | 43 | 9 | 1 | 0 | 3 | 0 | — | | 47 | 9 |
| AFC Bournemouth | 2015–16 | Premier League | 21 | 1 | 0 | 0 | 1 | 0 | — | | 22 | 1 |
| AFC Bournemouth | 2016–17 | Premier League | 35 | 1 | 0 | 0 | 0 | 0 | — | | 35 | 1 |
| AFC Bournemouth | 2017–18 | Premier League | 13 | 1 | 1 | 0 | 2 | 0 | — | | 16 | 1 |
| AFC Bournemouth | 2018–19 | Premier League | 0 | 0 | 0 | 0 | 0 | 0 | — | | 0 | 0 |
| AFC Bournemouth | 2019–20 | Premier League | 0 | 0 | 0 | 0 | 0 | 0 | — | | 0 | 0 |
| AFC Bournemouth | Total | | 232 | 28 | 10 | 1 | 9 | 0 | 4 | 0 | 255 | 29 |
| Carlisle United (loan) | 2010–11 | League One | 5 | 1 | — | | — | | — | | 5 | 1 |
| Cardiff City (loan) | 2018–19 | Premier League | 25 | 0 | 0 | 0 | 0 | 0 | — | | 25 | 0 |
| Fulham (loan) | 2019–20 | Championship | 28 | 2 | 1 | 1 | 0 | 0 | — | | 29 | 3 |
| Nottingham Forest | 2020–21 | Championship | 13 | 0 | 1 | 0 | 1 | 0 | — | | 15 | 0 |
| Nottingham Forest | 2021–22 | Championship | 0 | 0 | 0 | 0 | 0 | 0 | — | | 0 | 0 |
| Nottingham Forest | 2022–23 | Premier League | 0 | 0 | 0 | 0 | 0 | 0 | — | | 0 | 0 |
| Nottingham Forest | 2023–24 | Premier League | 0 | 0 | 0 | 0 | 0 | 0 | — | | 0 | 0 |
| Nottingham Forest | Total | | 13 | 0 | 1 | 0 | 1 | 0 | 0 | 0 | 15 | 0 |
| Charlton Athletic (loan) | 2021–22 | League One | 4 | 0 | 1 | 0 | 0 | 0 | 1 (Note: One appearance in EFL Trophy) | 0 | 6 | 0 |
| Notts County (loan) | 2021–22 | National League | 9 | 0 | — | | — | | — | | 9 | 0 |
| Career total | | | 362 | 36 | 18 | 5 | 11 | 0 | 11 | 2 | 402 | 43 |

=== International ===
As of 12 October 2021

Appearances and goals by national team and year
| National team | Year | Apps | Goals |
|---|---|---|---|
| Republic of Ireland | 2015 | 1 | 0 |
| Republic of Ireland | 2016 | 3 | 0 |
| Republic of Ireland | 2017 | 7 | 0 |
| Republic of Ireland | 2018 | 4 | 0 |
| Republic of Ireland | 2019 | 1 | 0 |
| Republic of Ireland | 2020 | 1 | 0 |
| Republic of Ireland | 2021 | 2 | 0 |
| Total | | 19 | 0 |

== Honours ==
Bournemouth

- Football League Championship: 2014–15
- Football League One runner-up: 2012–13

Individual

- PFA Fans' Player of the Year: 2014–15 Championship
- Bournemouth Supporters' Player of the Year: 2014–15

== See also ==
- List of Republic of Ireland international footballers born outside the Republic of Ireland
