= Jaynes =

Jaynes is a surname, and may refer to

- Allison Jaynes, American space physicist
- Cindy Jaynes (born 1959), American rear-admiral
- Dwight Jaynes, American sports journalist
- Edwin Thompson Jaynes (1922–1998), American physicist and theorist of probability
- Jeremy Jaynes (born 1974), American convicted spammer
- Julian Jaynes (1920–1997), American psychologist
- Leigh Jaynes, American freestyle wrestler
- Roderick Jaynes, name used by the Coen brothers
