= Elliot Ward =

21st-century English footballer

Personal information
- Date of birth: 7 September 1993 (age 33)
- Place of birth: Poole, England
- Position: Midfielder

Team information
- Current team: Dorchester Town

Senior career*
Years	Team	Apps	(Gls)
2011–2012	Bournemouth	0	(0)
2012	→ Wimborne Town (loan)	?	(?)
2012	Dorchester Town	4	(2)
- * Club domestic league appearances and goals as of 17:15, 19 February 2012 (UTC)

Elliot Ward is an English footballer who plays as a midfielder for Dorchester Town.

== Career ==
Ward was born in Poole, Dorset. He made his professional football debut for Bournemouth on 9 August 2011, in the League Cup 5–0 victory over Dagenham & Redbridge at Dean Court. He came on as a substitute for Mark Molesley. In January 2012, Ward was sent out on loan to Southern League side Wimborne Town.
