= 2019–20 Fulham F.C. season =

Fulham F.C.
2019–20 season
- Chairman: Shahid Khan
- Manager: Scott Parker
- Stadium: Craven Cottage
- Championship: 4th
- Play-offs: Winners (promoted)
- FA Cup: Fourth round
- EFL Cup: Second round
- Top goalscorer: Aleksandar Mitrović (26)
- Highest home attendance: League/All: 18,878 (24 Aug 2019 v Leeds United, EFL-C)
- Lowest home attendance: League: 17,066 (21 Aug 2019 v Millwall); All: 8,467 (27 Aug 2019 v Southampton, EFL Cup)
- Average home league attendance: 17,752
| Home colours | Away colours |

The 2019–20 Fulham F.C. season was the club's 122nd professional season and their first in the EFL Championship after their relegation from the Premier League in the 2018–19 campaign. Fulham also competed in the FA Cup and the EFL Cup. The season covered the period from 1 July 2019 to 4 August 2020.

== Transfers ==
=== Transfers in ===
| Date from | Position | Nationality | Name | From | Fee | Ref. |
|---|---|---|---|---|---|---|
| 14 July 2019 | CF | (England) | Martell Taylor-Crossdale | (England) Chelsea | Free transfer | |
| 1 August 2019 | FW | (England) | Jay Stansfield | (England) Exeter City | Undisclosed | |
| 5 August 2019 | CB | (England) | Ben Tricker | (England) Watford | Free transfer | |
| 8 August 2019 | AM | (England) | Josh Onomah | (England) Tottenham Hotspur | Undisclosed | |
| 12 August 2019 | LB | (Wales) | Jay Williams | (Wales) Newport County | Undisclosed | |
| 10 September 2019 | GK | (United States) | Damian Las | (United States) Chicago Fire | Undisclosed | |
| 1 January 2020 | CB | (Jamaica) | Michael Hector | (England) Chelsea | Undisclosed | |
| 7 January 2020 | RW | (Portugal) | Ivan Cavaleiro | (England) Wolverhampton Wanderers | Undisclosed | |
| 16 January 2020 | GK | (Scotland) | Jordan Archer | (England) Oxford United | Free transfer | |
| 24 January 2020 | AM | (Jamaica) | Bobby Decordova-Reid | (Wales) Cardiff City | Undisclosed | |
| 2 July 2020 | CF | (Scotland) | Kieron Bowie | (Scotland) Raith Rovers | Undisclosed | |
| 2 July 2020 | LB | (France) | Ziyad Larkeche | (France) Paris Saint-Germain | Free transfer | |
| 8 July 2020 | RW | (France) | Anthony Knockaert | (England) Brighton & Hove Albion | Undisclosed | |

=== Loans in ===
| Date from | Position | Nationality | Name | From | Date until | Ref. |
|---|---|---|---|---|---|---|
| 13 July 2019 | RW | (Portugal) | Ivan Cavaleiro | (England) Wolverhampton Wanderers | 7 January 2020 | |
| 21 July 2019 | RW | (France) | Anthony Knockaert | (England) Brighton & Hove Albion | 30 June 2020 | |
| 6 August 2019 | CM | (Republic of Ireland) | Harry Arter | (England) AFC Bournemouth | 30 June 2020 | |
| 8 August 2019 | CM | (England) | Harrison Reed | (England) Southampton | 30 June 2020 | |
| 8 August 2019 | AM | (Jamaica) | Bobby Reid | (Wales) Cardiff City | 24 January 2020 | |
| 16 January 2020 | CB | (Netherlands) | Terence Kongolo | (England) Huddersfield Town | 30 June 2020 | |

=== Loans out ===
| Date from | Position | Nationality | Name | To | Date until | Ref. |
|---|---|---|---|---|---|---|
| 18 July 2019 | CM | (Ivory Coast) | Jean Michaël Seri | (Turkey) Galatasaray | 30 June 2020 | |
| 26 July 2019 | DM | (Cameroon) | André-Frank Zambo Anguissa | (Spain) Villarreal | 30 June 2020 | |
| 20 August 2019 | GK | (Germany) | Toni Stahl | (Germany) Energie Cottbus | 30 June 2020 | |
| 28 August 2019 | GK | (England) | Taye Ashby-Hammond | (England) Maidenhead United | 30 June 2020 | |
| 2 September 2019 | GK | (Spain) | Fabri | (Spain) Mallorca | 30 June 2020 | |
| 2 September 2019 | CB | (England) | Jerome Opoku | (England) Accrington Stanley | 30 June 2020 | |
| 25 January 2020 | CM | (England) | Jayden Harris | (England) Woking | 29 February 2020 | |
| 30 January 2020 | CF | (England) | Timmy Abraham | (England) Bristol Rovers | 30 June 2020 | |
| 30 January 2020 | LB | (England) | Jaydn Mundle-Smith | (England) Maidenhead United | March 2020 | |

=== Transfers out ===
| Date from | Position | Nationality | Name | To | Fee | Ref. |
|---|---|---|---|---|---|---|
| 1 July 2019 | LW | (Germany) | André Schürrle | (Germany) Borussia Dortmund | Loan Return | |
| 1 July 2019 | CB | (England) | Calum Chambers | (England) Arsenal | Loan Return | |
| 1 July 2019 | LB | (Netherlands) | Timothy Fosu-Mensah | (England) Manchester United | Loan Return | |
| 1 July 2019 | GK | (Spain) | Sergio Rico | (Spain) Sevilla | Loan Return | |
| 1 July 2019 | CF | (Argentina) | Luciano Vietto | (Spain) Atlético Madrid | Loan Return | |
| 1 July 2019 | CB | (Norway) | Håvard Nordtveit | (Germany) 1899 Hoffenheim | Loan Return | |
| 1 July 2019 | LW | (England) | Showkat Tahir | (England) Cheshunt | Released | |
| 1 July 2019 | CF | (England) | Elijah Adebayo | (England) Walsall | Released | |
| 1 July 2019 | CB | (England) | Scott Armsworth | Free agent | Released | |
| 1 July 2019 | CB | (England) | Robert Atkinson | (England) Eastleigh | Released | |
| 1 July 2019 | LW | (Netherlands) | Ryan Babel | (Turkey) Galatasaray | Released | |
| 1 July 2019 | CB | (Wales) | Aron Davies | (England) Maidenhead United | Released | |
| 1 July 2019 | CB | (Spain) | José Garrido | (Spain) CF Sant Rafel | Released | |
| 1 July 2019 | CM | (Estonia) | Mattias Käit | (Slovenia) Domžale | Undisclosed | |
| 1 July 2019 | RW | (Jamaica) | Chris Kelly | Free agent | Released | |
| 1 July 2019 | RW | (Serbia) | Lazar Marković | (Serbia) Partizan | Released | |
| 1 July 2019 | GK | (Germany) | Berti Schötterl | (Germany) Lokomotive Leipzig | Released | |
| 1 July 2019 | LW | (Iceland) | Jón Dagur Þorsteinsson | (Denmark) AGF | Undisclosed | |
| 12 July 2019 | MF | (England) | Erick Kenko | (Wales) Swansea City | Undisclosed | |
| 28 July 2019 | RW | (England) | Harvey Elliott | (England) Liverpool | Undisclosed | |
| 8 August 2019 | LW | (England) | Ryan Sessegnon | (England) Tottenham Hotspur | Undisclosed | |
| 21 August 2019 | CF | (Portugal) | Rui Fonte | (Portugal) Braga | Free transfer | |
| 27 August 2019 | CB | (Guinea-Bissau) | Marcelo Djaló | (Spain) Lugo | Mutual consent | |
| 2 September 2019 | LW | (Togo) | Floyd Ayité | (Turkey) Gençlerbirliği | Undisclosed | |
| 2 September 2019 | LB | (Switzerland) | Elias Frei | (Switzerland) Luzern | Undisclosed | |
| 30 September 2019 | CB | (Australia) | Riley Warland | (Australia) Perth Glory | Undisclosed | |
| 10 January 2020 | DM | (England) | Tayo Edun | (England) Lincoln City | Undisclosed | |
| 1 February 2020 | DM | (Guinea) | Ibrahima Cissé | Free agent | Mutual consent | |

== Pre-season ==
The Cottagers announced their pre-season schedule in June 2019.

| 6 July 2019 Friendly | Fulham | 1–3 | Cambridge United | Behind closed doors |
| 12:00 BST | de la Torre 57' | Report | Ibehre 17', 44'; Knibbs 31' | Stadium: Motspur Park; Attendance: 0 |

| 16 July 2019 Friendly | FC Porto | 1–0 | Fulham | Albufeira, Portugal |
| 20:30 BST | Otávio 29' | Report | | Stadium: Estadio Municipal de Albufeira; Attendance: 3,000; Referee: Tiago Martins (Portugal) |

| 20 July 2019 Friendly | Fulham | 2–1 | Brighton & Hove Albion | Aldershot |
| 15:00 BST | Cairney 50', 59' | Report | Dunk 25' | Stadium: EBB Stadium |

| 23 July 2019 Friendly | Oxford United | 1–1 | Fulham | Oxford |
| 19:45 BST | Mousinho 59' | Report | Knockaert 22' | Stadium: Kassam Stadium |

| 27 July 2019 Friendly | Fulham | 0–1 | West Ham United | Fulham |
| 15:00 BST | | Report | Lanzini 17' | Stadium: Craven Cottage |

== Competitions ==
=== League table ===
| Pos | Team | Pld | W | D | L | GF | GA | GD | Pts | Promotion, qualification or relegation |
|---|---|---|---|---|---|---|---|---|---|---|
| 1 | Leeds United (C, P) | 46 | 28 | 9 | 9 | 77 | 35 | +42 | 93 | Promotion to the Premier League |
| 2 | West Bromwich Albion (P) | 46 | 22 | 17 | 7 | 77 | 45 | +32 | 83 | Promotion to the Premier League |
| 3 | Brentford | 46 | 24 | 9 | 13 | 80 | 38 | +42 | 81 | Qualification for Championship play-offs (Note: Four teams play for one spot and promotion to the Premier League.) |
| 4 | Fulham (O, P) | 46 | 23 | 12 | 11 | 64 | 48 | +16 | 81 | Qualification for Championship play-offs |
| 5 | Cardiff City | 46 | 19 | 16 | 11 | 68 | 58 | +10 | 73 | Qualification for Championship play-offs |
| 6 | Swansea City | 46 | 18 | 16 | 12 | 62 | 53 | +9 | 70 | Qualification for Championship play-offs |
| 7 | Nottingham Forest | 46 | 18 | 16 | 12 | 58 | 50 | +8 | 70 | |

Source: EFL Official Website
Rules for classification: 1) Points; 2) Goal difference; 3) Number of goals scored; 4) Head-to-head results; 5) Wins; 6) Away goals; 7) Penalty points (sec 9.5); 8) 12-point sending off offences
(C) Champions; (O) Play-off winners; (P) Promoted

==== Results summary ====
| Overall | | | | | | | | Home | | | | | | Away | | | | | |
| Pld | W | D | L | GF | GA | GD | Pts | W | D | L | GF | GA | GD | W | D | L | GF | GA | GD |
|---|---|---|---|---|---|---|---|---|---|---|---|---|---|---|---|---|---|---|---|
| 46 | 23 | 12 | 11 | 64 | 48 | +16 | 81 | 15 | 2 | 6 | 40 | 26 | +14 | 8 | 10 | 5 | 24 | 22 | +2 |

Last updated: 22 July 2020.

==== Results by matchday ====
| Matchday | 1 | 2 | 3 | 4 | 5 | 6 | 7 | 8 | 9 | 10 | 11 | 12 | 13 | 14 | 15 | 16 | 17 | 18 | 19 | 20 | 21 | 22 | 23 | 24 | 25 | 26 | 27 | 28 | 29 | 30 | 31 | 32 | 33 | 34 | 35 | 36 | 37 | 38 | 39 | 40 | 41 | 42 | 43 | 44 | 45 | 46 |
|---|---|---|---|---|---|---|---|---|---|---|---|---|---|---|---|---|---|---|---|---|---|---|---|---|---|---|---|---|---|---|---|---|---|---|---|---|---|---|---|---|---|---|---|---|---|---|
| Ground | A | H | A | H | H | A | H | A | H | A | H | A | H | A | H | A | H | H | A | H | A | A | H | A | H | H | A | H | A | H | A | A | H | A | H | H | A | H | A | A | H | A | H | A | H | A |
| Result | L | W | W | W | L | D | D | D | W | W | D | L | W | D | L | W | W | W | W | L | L | L | W | D | W | L | W | W | D | W | W | D | L | D | W | W | D | L | L | W | W | W | W | D | W | D |
| Position | 22 | 11 | 7 | 3 | 5 | 6 | 11 | 12 | 8 | 5 | 7 | 10 | 7 | 6 | 8 | 7 | 4 | 3 | 3 | 3 | 3 | 6 | 3 | 5 | 3 | 5 | 4 | 3 | 3 | 3 | 3 | 3 | 3 | 3 | 3 | 3 | 3 | 3 | 5 | 4 | 4 | 4 | 4 | 4 | 4 | 4 |

Updated to match(es) played on 22 July 2020. Source: Statto.com
A = Away; H = Home; W = Win; D = Draw; L = Loss

==== Matches ====
On Thursday, 20 June 2019, the EFL Championship fixtures were revealed.

| 3 August 2019 1 | Barnsley | 1–0 | Fulham | Barnsley |
| 15:00 BST | Thomas 13'; Mowatt (yellow card) 44'; Diaby (yellow card) 54'; Wilks (yellow card) 90+4' | Report | Le Marchand (yellow card) 32' | Stadium: Oakwell; Attendance: 14,823; Referee: Andy Davies |

| 10 August 2019 2 | Fulham | 2–0 | Blackburn Rovers | Fulham |
| 15:00 BST | Cairney 35'; Mitrović 81' | Report | Johnson (yellow card) 61'; Bennett (yellow card) 86' | Stadium: Craven Cottage; Attendance: 17,987; Referee: Keith Stroud |

| 16 August 2019 3 | Huddersfield Town | 1–2 | Fulham | Huddersfield |
| 19:45 BST | Grant 57'; Kachunga (yellow card) 62'; Hogg (yellow card) 71' | Report | Sessegnon (yellow card) 15'; Mitrović 51'; Mawson (yellow card) 58'; Cavaleiro 80' | Stadium: John Smith's Stadium; Attendance: 20,775; Referee: James Linington |
Note: Live on Sky Sports

| 21 August 2019 4 | Fulham | 4–0 | Millwall | Fulham |
| 19:45 BST | Cavaleiro 15', 63'; Mitrović (yellow card) 25', (goal) 56' (pen.); Knockaert (yellow card) 28', (goal) 32' | Report | Cooper (yellow card) 25' | Stadium: Craven Cottage; Attendance: 17,066; Referee: Darren Bond |

| 24 August 2019 5 | Fulham | 1–2 | Nottingham Forest | Fulham |
| 15:00 BST | Arter (yellow card) 50'; Mitrović 83'; Kamara (yellow card) 90+9' | Report | Grabban 4', 61'; Ameobi (yellow card) 33'; Semedo (yellow card) 66'; Samba (yellow card) 77'; Adomah (yellow card) 90+8' | Stadium: Craven Cottage; Attendance: 18,186; Referee: Peter Bankes |

| 30 August 2019 6 | Cardiff City | 1–1 | Fulham | Cardiff |
| 19:45 BST | Murphy 42'; Bacuna (yellow card) 80' | Report | Mitrović 45'; Arter (yellow card) 66' (yellow-red card) 68'; Bettinelli (yellow card) 72'; Mawson (yellow card) 85'; Cairney (yellow card) 89' | Stadium: Cardiff City Stadium; Attendance: 22,631; Referee: Tim Robinson |
Note: Live on Sky Sports

| 14 September 2019 7 | Fulham | 1–1 | West Bromwich Albion | Fulham |
| 12:30 BST | Sessegnon (yellow card) 41'; Knockaert 49'; Odoi (yellow card) 90+4' | Report | Furlong (yellow card) 56'; Ajayi 80' | Stadium: Craven Cottage; Attendance: 17,770; Referee: David Webb |
Note: Live on Sky Sports

| 21 September 2019 8 | Sheffield Wednesday | 1–1 | Fulham | Owlerton |
| 15:00 BST | Hutchinson (yellow card) 90'; Börner (yellow card) 90+2'; Nuhiu 90+3' | Report | Cairney 42'; Bettinelli (yellow card) 90' | Stadium: Hillsborough; Attendance: 23,342; Referee: Geoff Eltringham |

| 27 September 2019 9 | Fulham | 2–0 | Wigan Athletic | Fulham |
| 19:45 BST | Bryan 47'; Reed (yellow card) 58'; Mitrović (yellow card) 66'; Cairney 83' | Report | Morsy (yellow card) 5'; Dunkley (yellow card) 46'; Williams (yellow card) 66' | Stadium: Craven Cottage; Referee: Dean Whitestone |

| 1 October 2019 10 | Reading | 1–4 | Fulham | Reading |
| 20:00 BST | Méïté 89'; Swift (yellow card) 6' (red card) 20'; Moore (yellow card) 71' | Report | Cairney 13', 67'; Mitrović 26', 29' | Stadium: Madejski Stadium; Referee: Andy Woolmer |

| 5 October 2019 11 | Fulham | 2–2 | Charlton Athletic | Fulham |
| 12:30 BST | Bryan (yellow card) 8'; Cavaleiro 55'; Mitrović 63' (yellow card) 78' | Report | Gallagher (yellow card) 30' (goal) 41'; Bonne 57' | Stadium: Craven Cottage; Attendance: 18,654; Referee: Keith Stroud |

| 19 October 2019 12 | Stoke City | 2–0 | Fulham | Stoke-on-Trent |
| 15:00 BST | Campbell 16'; Ndiaye (yellow card) 63'; Batth (yellow card) 65'; Gregory 80' (pen.) | Report | Mitrović (yellow card) 26'; Bettinelli (yellow card) 79' | Stadium: bet365 Stadium; Attendance: 23,189; Referee: Andy Davies |

| 23 October 2019 13 | Fulham | 3–2 | Luton Town | Fulham |
| 19:45 BST | Mitrović 16', 53', 67'; Cairney (yellow card) 73' | Report | Potts 60'; LuaLua 90+3' | Stadium: Craven Cottage; Attendance: 18,082; Referee: John Brooks |

| 26 October 2019 14 | Middlesbrough | 0–0 | Fulham | Middlesbrough |
| 15:00 BST | Tavernier (yellow card) 42'; Coulson (yellow card) 45+1'; McNair (yellow card) 87' | Report | Odoi (yellow card) 7'; Rodák (red card) 17'; Reed (yellow card) 72' | Stadium: Riverside Stadium; Attendance: 19,101; Referee: Peter Bankes |

| 2 November 2019 15 | Fulham | 0–3 | Hull City | Fulham |
| 15:00 GMT | Reed (yellow card) 37'; Johansen (yellow card) 74' | Report | Bowler 9'; Irvine (yellow card) 44'; Bowen 57'; Eaves 84' (yellow card) 90' | Stadium: Craven Cottage; Attendance: 18,168; Referee: Keith Stroud |

| 9 November 2019 16 | Birmingham City | 0–1 | Fulham | Bordesley |
| 15:00 GMT | Bellingham (yellow card) 45+3'; Clarke-Salter (yellow card) 85'; Roberts (yellow card) 90+4' | Report | Mitrović (yellow card) 45+3' (goal) 52'; Christie (yellow card) 78' | Stadium: St Andrew's Trillion Trophy Stadium; Attendance: 21,334; Referee: Jarred Gillett |

| 22 November 2019 17 | Fulham | 2–1 | Queens Park Rangers | Fulham |
| 19:45 GMT | Kamara 27', 64'; Bryan (yellow card) 61' | Report | Hugill 3' | Stadium: Craven Cottage; Attendance: 18,320; Referee: James Linington |

| 26 November 2019 18 | Fulham | 3–0 | Derby County | Fulham |
| 19:45 GMT | Decordova-Reid 7'; Cavaleiro (yellow card) 34'; Mitrović 40'; Cairney 89' | Report | Forsyth (yellow card) 45'; Dowell (yellow card) 90+3' | Stadium: Craven Cottage; Attendance: 16,856; Referee: Andy Woolmer |

| 29 November 2019 19 | Swansea City | 1–2 | Fulham | Swansea |
| 19:45 GMT | Byers 65' | Report | Mitrović 22', 43'; Kamara (yellow card) 32' | Stadium: Liberty Stadium; Attendance: 16,024; Referee: Simon Hooper |

| 7 December 2019 20 | Fulham | 1–2 | Bristol City | Fulham |
| 15:00 GMT | Odoi (yellow card) 40'; Knockaert (yellow card) 70'; Kamara 86'; Cairney (yellow card) 90+3'; Johansen (yellow card) 90+4'; Rodák (yellow card) 90+7'; Mawson (yellow card) 90+8' | Report | Brownhill 26'; Eliasson (yellow card) 57'; Diédhiou 76'; Hunt (yellow card) 90+4' | Stadium: Craven Cottage; Attendance: 18,779; Referee: Jeremy Simpson |

| 10 December 2019 21 | Preston North End | 2–1 | Fulham | Preston |
| 19:45 GMT | Maguire 23'; Pearson (yellow card) 34'; Rafferty (red card) 45'; Nugent 52'; Browne (yellow card) 75'; Huntington (yellow card) 76'; Potts (yellow card) 83' | Report | Odoi (red card) 28'; Mitrović 81'; Onomah (yellow card) 88' | Stadium: Deepdale; Attendance: 10,093; Referee: Keith Stroud |

| 14 December 2019 22 | Brentford | 1–0 | Fulham | Brentford |
| 15:00 GMT | Mbeumo 22'; Dalsgaard (yellow card) 65' | Report | Bryan (yellow card) 12' | Stadium: Griffin Park; Attendance: 12,305; Referee: Oliver Langford |

| 21 December 2019 23 | Fulham | 2–1 | Leeds United | Fulham |
| 15:00 GMT | Mitrović 7' (pen.) (yellow card) 89'; Reed (yellow card) 29'; Bryan (yellow card) 45+3'; Onomah 69' | Report | Klich (yellow card) 17'; Cooper (yellow card) 24'; Costa (yellow card) 45+3'; Bamford 54'; Alioski (yellow card) 81' | Stadium: Craven Cottage; Attendance: 18,878; Referee: Tim Robinson |

| 26 December 2019 24 | Luton Town | 3–3 | Fulham | Luton |
| 15:00 GMT | LuaLua 5'; Collins 28'; Cornick 84' | Report | Decordova-Reid 9', 90+4'; Mitrović 77' | Stadium: Kenilworth Road; Attendance: 10,068; Referee: Dean Whitestone |

| 29 December 2019 25 | Fulham | 1–0 | Stoke City | Fulham |
| 15:00 GMT | Decordova-Reid (yellow card) 20' (goal) 26'; Rodák (yellow card) 90+6' | Report | Ince (yellow card) 20'; Shawcross (yellow card) 60'; Martins Indi (yellow card) 90' | Stadium: Craven Cottage; Attendance: 18,747; Referee: Andy Davies |

| 1 January 2020 26 | Fulham | 1–2 | Reading | Fulham |
| 15:00 GMT | Bryan (yellow card) 45'; Cavaleiro 61' (yellow card) 62'; Mitrović (yellow card) 73'; Knockaert (yellow card) 90+2' | Report | Swift 14'; Adam 48'; Pelé (yellow card) 68'; João (yellow card) 76'; Morrison (yellow card) 90+2' | Stadium: Craven Cottage; Attendance: 18,575; Referee: Geoff Eltringham |

| 11 January 2020 27 | Hull City | 0–1 | Fulham | Kingston-upon-Hull |
| 15:00 GMT | Bowen (yellow card) 67' | Report | Cavaleiro 29' (yellow card) 71'; Mitrović (yellow card) 73'; McDonald (yellow card) 86'; Christie (yellow card) 90+4' | Stadium: KCOM Stadium; Attendance: 11,347; Referee: Matt Donohue |

| 17 January 2020 28 | Fulham | 1–0 | Middlesbrough | Fulham |
| 19:45 GMT | Knockaert 6'; McDonald (yellow card) 60' | Report | McNair (yellow card) 72' | Stadium: Craven Cottage; Attendance: 18,375; Referee: David Webb |

| 22 January 2020 29 | Charlton Athletic | 0–0 | Fulham | Charlton |
| 19:45 GMT | Cullen (yellow card) 86' | Report | McDonald (yellow card) 90+4' | Stadium: The Valley; Attendance: 16,424; Referee: Stephen Martin |

| 1 February 2020 30 | Fulham | 3–2 | Huddersfield Town | Fulham |
| 15:00 GMT | Decordova-Reid 10'; Cairney 15'; Mitrović 31'; McDonald (yellow card) 48'; Christie (yellow card) 82'; Rodák (yellow card) 90+1'; Johansen (yellow card) 90+3' | Report | Smith Rowe 35'; O'Brien (yellow card) 38'; Mounié 39' | Stadium: Craven Cottage; Attendance: 18,013; Referee: Gavin Ward |

| 8 February 2020 31 | Blackburn Rovers | 0–1 | Fulham | Blackburn |
| 15:00 GMT | | Report | Mitrović 65'; Decordova-Reid (yellow card) 79' | Stadium: Ewood Park; Attendance: 13,087; Referee: Tony Harrington |

| 12 February 2020 32 | Millwall | 1–1 | Fulham | Bermondsey |
| 19:45 GMT | Böðvarsson 8'; Wallace (penalty missed) 22'; Woods (yellow card) 25' | Report | Mitrović 3'; Cairney (yellow card) 61'; Arter (yellow card) 81' | Stadium: The Den; Referee: Andrew Madley |

| 15 February 2020 33 | Fulham | 0–3 | Barnsley | Fulham |
| 15:00 GMT | Bryan (yellow card) 29' | Report | Woodrow 24' (pen.), 79'; Halme (yellow card) 26'; Brown 51' | Stadium: Craven Cottage; Attendance: 18,516; Referee: James Linington |

| 21 February 2020 34 | Derby County | 1–1 | Fulham | Derby |
| 19:45 GMT | Rooney 55' (pen.) | Report | Arter (yellow card) 62'; Mitrović 71' | Stadium: Pride Park Stadium; Attendance: 25,442; Referee: Darren Bond |

| 26 February 2020 35 | Fulham | 1–0 | Swansea City | Fulham |
| 19:45 GMT | Mitrović (penalty missed) 89' 90+4' | Report | Brewster (yellow card) 35'; Fulton (yellow card) 54'; Naughton (yellow card) 66'; Ayew (yellow card) 88' | Stadium: Craven Cottage; Attendance: 17,626; Referee: Tim Robinson |

| 29 February 2020 36 | Fulham | 2–0 | Preston North End | Fulham |
| 15:00 GMT | Nugent 58' (o.g.); Kamara 90+5' | Report | | Stadium: Craven Cottage; Attendance: 19,020; Referee: David Webb |

| 7 March 2020 37 | Bristol City | 1–1 | Fulham | Ashton Gate |
| 12:30 GMT | Pereira (yellow card) 60'; Wells 70'; Benković (yellow card) 75' | Report | Arter (yellow card) 41'; Odoi (yellow card) 48'; Cairney 84' | Stadium: Ashton Gate Stadium; Attendance: 23,796; Referee: David Coote |

| 20 June 2020 38 | Fulham | 0–2 | Brentford | Fulham |
| 12:30 BST | Arter (yellow card) 90' | Report | Dasilva (yellow card) 37'; Benrahma 88'; Marcondes (yellow card) 90', (goal) 90+1' | Stadium: Craven Cottage; Attendance: 0 Referee: James Linington |
Note: Season was suspended until 3 April 2020, due to the COVID-19 pandemic. The match was rescheduled to 20 June.

| 27 June 2020 39 | Leeds United | 3–0 | Fulham | Leeds |
| 15:00 BST | Bamford 10'; Alioski (yellow card) 50', (goal) 56'; Harrison 71'; Phillips (yellow card) 89' | Report | Knockaert (yellow card) 35'; Kebano (yellow card) 84' (red card) 90+1'; Cavaleiro (yellow card) 90+4' | Stadium: Elland Road; Attendance: 0 Referee: Tony Harrington |
Note: Season was suspended until 3 April 2020, due to the COVID-19 pandemic. The match was rescheduled to 27 June.

| 30 June 2020 40 | Queens Park Rangers | 1–2 | Fulham | Shepherd's Bush |
| 18:30 BST | Hugill 1', (yellow card) 45+1'; Kakay (yellow card) 23' | Report | Arter 21'; Christie (yellow card) 32', (goal) 75'; Cairney (yellow card) 53'; Knockaert (yellow card) 64' | Stadium: Kiyan Prince Foundation Stadium; Attendance: 0 Referee: Gavin Ward |
Note: Season was suspended until 3 April 2020, due to the COVID-19 pandemic. The match was rescheduled to 30 June.

| 4 July 2020 41 | Fulham | 1–0 | Birmingham City | Fulham |
| 15:00 BST | Reid (yellow card) 33'; Odoi (yellow card) 34'; Onomah 90+5' | Report | Gardner (yellow card) 30'; Bellingham (yellow card) 38'; Roberts (yellow card) 40'; Clarke-Salter (yellow card) 90+2' | Stadium: Craven Cottage; Attendance: 0 Referee: Keith Stroud |
Note: On 3 April, the English Football League decided to postpone all football until safe to do so due to the COVID-19 pandemic. The match was rescheduled to 4 July.

| 7 July 2020 42 | Nottingham Forest | 0–1 | Fulham | West Bridgford |
| 17:00 BST | Ribeiro (yellow card) 83'; Cash (yellow card) 89' | Report | Onomah (yellow card) 44'; Arter 45+4'; Odoi (yellow card) 90+5' | Stadium: City Ground; Attendance: 0 Referee: Robert Jones |
Note: On 3 April, the English Football League decided to postpone all football until safe to do so due to the COVID-19 pandemic. The match was rescheduled to 7 July.

| 10 July 2020 43 | Fulham | 2–0 | Cardiff City | Fulham |
| 20:15 BST | Mitrović 35' (pen.); Knockaert (yellow card) 39'; Hector (yellow card) 58'; Onomah 66'; Christie (yellow card) 77' | Report | Ralls (yellow card) 81' | Stadium: Craven Cottage; Attendance: 0 Referee: Gavin Ward |
Note: On 3 April, the English Football League decided to postpone all football until safe to do so due to the COVID-19 pandemic. The match was rescheduled to 10 July.

| 14 July 2020 44 | West Bromwich Albion | 0–0 | Fulham | West Bromwich |
| 17:00 BST | Pereira (yellow card) 50'; Livermore (yellow card) 55'; Townsend (yellow card) 86' | Report | | Stadium: The Hawthorns; Attendance: 0 Referee: Geoff Eltringham |
Note: On 3 April, the English Football League decided to postpone all football until safe to do so due to the COVID-19 pandemic. The match was rescheduled to 14 July.

| 18 July 2020 45 | Fulham | 5–3 | Sheffield Wednesday | Fulham |
| 15:00 BST | Kebano 11', 73'; Mitrović 26', 41' (pen.); Reid (yellow card) 84', (goal) 90+1'; Reed (yellow card) 90+1' (yellow-red card) 90+4' | Report | Nuhiu 49' (pen.), 89'; Murphy 78' | Stadium: Craven Cottage; Attendance: 0 Referee: Darren England |
Note: On 3 April, the English Football League decided to postpone all football until safe to do so due to the COVID-19 pandemic. The match was rescheduled to 18 July.

| 22 July 2020 46 | Wigan Athletic | 1–1 | Fulham | Wigan |
| 19:30 BST | Morsy (yellow card) 17'; Moore 32'; Robinson (yellow card) 44'; Williams (yellow card) 48' | Report | Odoi (yellow card) 22'; Onomah (yellow card) 34'; Kebano 49', (yellow card) 74'; Hector (yellow card) 86' | Stadium: DW Stadium; Attendance: 0 Referee: John Brooks |
Note: On 3 April, the English Football League decided to postpone all football until safe to do so due to the COVID-19 pandemic. The match was rescheduled to 22 July.

==== Play-offs ====
| 27 July 2020 Semi-final 1st leg | Cardiff City | 0–2 | Fulham | Cardiff |
| 19:45 BST | Hoilett (yellow card) 45'; Bacuna (yellow card) 77' | Report | Onomah 49'; Kebano 90+1' | Stadium: Cardiff City Stadium; Attendance: 0 Referee: Geoff Eltringham |

| 30 July 2020 Semi-final 2nd leg | Fulham | 1–2 (3–2 agg.) | Cardiff City | London |
| 19:45 BST | Kebano 9'; Reid (yellow card) 50'; Rodák (yellow card) 59'; Christie (yellow card) 69'; Onomah (yellow card) 90+3' | Report | Nelson 8'; Morrison (yellow card) 35'; Bacuna (yellow card) 45+2'; Tomlin 47'; Vaulks (yellow card) 52'; Ralls (yellow card) 62' | Stadium: Craven Cottage; Attendance: 0 Referee: Paul Tierney |

| 4 August 2020 Final | Brentford | 1–2 (a.e.t.) | Fulham | London |
| 19:45 BST | Jensen (yellow card) 88'; Nørgaard (yellow card) 103'; Dalsgaard 120+4' | Report | Reed (yellow card) 29'; Cairney (yellow card) 67'; Hector (yellow card) 98'; Knockaert (yellow card) 102'; Mitrović (yellow card) 104'; Bryan 105', 117'; Cavaleiro (yellow card) 120+2'; Rodák (yellow card) 120+4' | Stadium: Wembley Stadium; Attendance: 0 Referee: Martin Atkinson |

=== FA Cup ===
The second round draw was made live on BBC Two from Etihad Stadium, Micah Richards and Tony Adams conducted the draw. The fourth round draw was made by Alex Scott and David O'Leary on Monday, 6 January.

| 4 January 2020 Third round | Fulham | 2–1 | Aston Villa | Fulham |
| 15:00 GMT | McDonald (yellow card) 47'; Knockaert 54' (yellow card) 88'; Arter 74'; Hector (yellow card) 90+7' | Report | Nakamba (yellow card) 6'; Taylor (yellow card) 21'; El Ghazi 63'; Lansbury (yellow card) 90+6' | Stadium: Craven Cottage; Attendance: 12,980; Referee: Craig Pawson |

| 26 January 2020 Fourth round | Manchester City | 4–0 | Fulham | Manchester |
| 13:00 GMT | Gündoğan 8' (pen.); B. Silva 19'; Gabriel Jesus 72', 75' | Report | Ream (red card) 6'; Bryan (yellow card) 90+1' | Stadium: City of Manchester Stadium; Attendance: 39,223; Referee: Kevin Friend |

=== EFL Cup ===
The second round draw was made on 13 August 2019 following the conclusion of all but one first-round matches.

| 27 August 2019 Second round | Fulham | 0–1 | Southampton | Fulham |
| 19:45 BST | Johansen (yellow card) 47'; Le Marchand (yellow card) 71' | Report | Danso (yellow card) 6'; Ward-Prowse (yellow card) 8'; Obafemi 57' | Stadium: Craven Cottage; Attendance: 8,467; Referee: Robert Jones |

== Squad statistics ==
=== Appearances and goals ===
| No. | Pos | Nat | Player | Total | | Championship | | Play-offs | | FA Cup | | EFL Cup | |
| No. | Pos | Nat | Player | Apps | Goals | Apps | Goals | Apps | Goals | Apps | Goals | Apps | Goals |
Goalkeepers
| 1 | GK | (England) ENG | Marcus Bettinelli | 14 | 0 | 13+1 | 0 | 0 | 0 | 0 | 0 | 0 | 0 |
| 12 | GK | (Slovakia) SVK | Marek Rodák | 39 | 0 | 33 | 0 | 3 | 0 | 2 | 0 | 1 | 0 |
| 33 | GK | (England) ENG | Magnus Norman | 0 | 0 | 0 | 0 | 0 | 0 | 0 | 0 | 0 | 0 |
Defenders
| 3 | DF | (Jamaica) JAM | Michael Hector | 25 | 0 | 20 | 0 | 3 | 0 | 2 | 0 | 0 | 0 |
| 4 | DF | (Belgium) BEL | Denis Odoi | 39 | 0 | 30+4 | 0 | 1+2 | 0 | 1+1 | 0 | 0 | 0 |
| 5 | DF | (England) ENG | Alfie Mawson | 28 | 0 | 25+2 | 0 | 0 | 0 | 1 | 0 | 0 | 0 |
| 13 | DF | (United States) USA | Tim Ream | 48 | 0 | 44 | 0 | 3 | 0 | 1 | 0 | 0 | 0 |
| 15 | DF | (Netherlands) NED | Terence Kongolo | 2 | 0 | 0+1 | 0 | 0 | 0 | 1 | 0 | 0 | 0 |
| 20 | DF | (France) FRA | Maxime Le Marchand | 15 | 0 | 3+9 | 0 | 0+2 | 0 | 0 | 0 | 1 | 0 |
| 22 | DF | (Republic of Ireland) IRL | Cyrus Christie | 30 | 1 | 13+11 | 1 | 2+1 | 0 | 2 | 0 | 1 | 0 |
| 23 | DF | (England) ENG | Joe Bryan | 49 | 3 | 39+4 | 1 | 3 | 2 | 2 | 0 | 1 | 0 |
| 43 | DF | (England) ENG | Steven Sessegnon | 15 | 0 | 9+5 | 0 | 0 | 0 | 1 | 0 | 0 | 0 |
Midfielders
| 6 | MF | (Scotland) SCO | Kevin McDonald | 18 | 0 | 7+9 | 0 | 0 | 0 | 1 | 0 | 1 | 0 |
| 7 | MF | (Democratic Republic of the Congo) COD | Neeskens Kebano | 19 | 5 | 5+11 | 3 | 3 | 2 | 0 | 0 | 0 | 0 |
| 8 | MF | (Norway) NOR | Stefan Johansen | 36 | 0 | 19+14 | 0 | 0 | 0 | 2 | 0 | 1 | 0 |
| 10 | MF | (Scotland) SCO | Tom Cairney | 43 | 8 | 38+1 | 8 | 3 | 0 | 0+1 | 0 | 0 | 0 |
| 18 | MF | (Republic of Ireland) IRL | Harry Arter | 29 | 3 | 21+7 | 2 | 0 | 0 | 0+1 | 1 | 0 | 0 |
| 21 | MF | (England) ENG | Harrison Reed | 28 | 0 | 21+4 | 0 | 3 | 0 | 0 | 0 | 0 | 0 |
| 25 | MF | (England) ENG | Josh Onomah | 37 | 4 | 20+11 | 3 | 3 | 1 | 2 | 0 | 1 | 0 |
| 33 | MF | (England) ENG | Matt O'Riley | 2 | 0 | 0+1 | 0 | 0 | 0 | 0 | 0 | 1 | 0 |
| 35 | MF | (Australia) AUS | Tyrese Francois | 1 | 0 | 0 | 0 | 0 | 0 | 0 | 0 | 0+1 | 0 |
| 36 | MF | (United States) USA | Luca de la Torre | 4 | 0 | 0+2 | 0 | 0 | 0 | 0+1 | 0 | 1 | 0 |
| 38 | MF | (Thailand) THA | Ben Davis | 1 | 0 | 0 | 0 | 0 | 0 | 0 | 0 | 0+1 | 0 |
| 58 | MF | (England) ENG | Sylvester Jasper | 3 | 0 | 0+2 | 0 | 0 | 0 | 0+1 | 0 | 0 | 0 |
Forwards
| 9 | FW | (Serbia) SRB | Aleksandar Mitrović | 41 | 26 | 40 | 26 | 0+1 | 0 | 0 | 0 | 0 | 0 |
| 14 | FW | (Jamaica) JAM | Bobby Decordova-Reid | 46 | 6 | 30+11 | 6 | 3 | 0 | 1 | 0 | 1 | 0 |
| 19 | FW | (Portugal) POR | Ivan Cavaleiro | 46 | 6 | 36+7 | 6 | 0+1 | 0 | 2 | 0 | 0 | 0 |
| 24 | FW | (France) FRA | Anthony Knockaert | 46 | 4 | 32+10 | 3 | 2+1 | 0 | 1 | 1 | 0 | 0 |
| 39 | FW | (England) ENG | Martell Taylor-Crossdale | 1 | 0 | 0 | 0 | 0 | 0 | 0 | 0 | 0+1 | 0 |
| 47 | FW | (Mauritania) MTN | Aboubakar Kamara | 29 | 4 | 8+17 | 4 | 1+2 | 0 | 0 | 0 | 1 | 0 |
| 61 | FW | (England) ENG | Jay Stansfield | 2 | 0 | 0+1 | 0 | 0 | 0 | 0+1 | 0 | 0 | 0 |
Out on Loan
| 34 | DF | (England) ENG | Jerome Opoku | 0 | 0 | 0 | 0 | 0 | 0 | 0 | 0 | 0 | 0 |
| 46 | MF | (England) ENG | Jayden Harris | 0 | 0 | 0 | 0 | 0 | 0 | 0 | 0 | 0 | 0 |
Left During Season
| 11 | FW | (Togo) TOG | Floyd Ayité | 1 | 0 | 0+1 | 0 | 0 | 0 | 0 | 0 | 0 | 0 |
| 17 | FW | (Portugal) POR | Rui Fonte | 0 | 0 | 0 | 0 | 0 | 0 | 0 | 0 | 0 | 0 |

Last updated: 4 August 2020
Source: Competitions

=== Top scorers ===
Includes all competitive matches. The list is sorted by squad number when total goals are equal.

Last updated 4 August 2020.

| Rank | No. | Nationality | Player | Championship | Play-offs | FA Cup | Carabao Cup | Total |
|---|---|---|---|---|---|---|---|---|
1
| 1 | 9 | (Serbia) | Aleksandar Mitrović | 26 | 0 | 0 | 0 | 26 |
2
| 2 | 10 | (Scotland) | Tom Cairney | 8 | 0 | 0 | 0 | 8 |
3
| 3 | 14 | (Jamaica) | Bobby Decordova-Reid | 6 | 0 | 0 | 0 | 6 |
| 3 | 19 | (Portugal) | Ivan Cavaleiro | 6 | 0 | 0 | 0 | 6 |
5
| 5 | 7 | (Democratic Republic of the Congo) | Neeskens Kebano | 3 | 2 | 0 | 0 | 5 |
6
| 6 | 24 | (France) | Anthony Knockaert | 3 | 0 | 1 | 0 | 4 |
| 6 | 25 | (England) | Josh Onomah | 3 | 1 | 0 | 0 | 4 |
| 6 | 47 | (Mauritania) | Aboubakar Kamara | 4 | 0 | 0 | 0 | 4 |
9
| 9 | 18 | (Republic of Ireland) | Harry Arter | 2 | 0 | 1 | 0 | 3 |
| 9 | 23 | (England) | Joe Bryan | 1 | 2 | 0 | 0 | 3 |
11
| 11 | 22 | (Republic of Ireland) | Cyrus Christie | 1 | 0 | 0 | 0 | 1 |
| Own goals | | | | 1 | 0 | 0 | 0 | 1 |
| TOTALS | | | | 64 | 5 | 2 | 0 | 71 |
