= Aleksandar Mitrović =

Serbian footballer (born 1994)

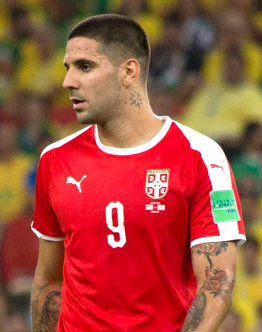
- Mitrović with Serbia at the 2018 FIFA World Cup

Personal information
- Full name: Aleksandar Mitrović
- Date of birth: 16 September 1994 (age 32)
- Place of birth: Smederevo, Serbia, FR Yugoslavia
- Height: 1.89 m (6 ft 2 in)
- Position: Striker

Team information
- Current team: Al Rayyan
- Number: 9

Youth career
- 2005–2011: Partizan

Senior career*
Years	Team	Apps	(Gls)
2011–2012	Teleoptik	25	(7)
2012–2013	Partizan	28	(13)
2013–2015	Anderlecht	69	(36)
2015–2018	Newcastle United	65	(14)
2018	→ Fulham (loan)	17	(12)
2018–2023	Fulham	173	(97)
2023–2025	Al Hilal	51	(47)
2025–	Al Rayyan	16	(8)

International career^{‡}
2011–2013	Serbia U19 (Note: Only official UEFA matches included)	13	(5)
2013–2014	Serbia U21	8	(6)
2013–	Serbia	108	(64)
Medal record
Men's football
Representing Serbia
UEFA European Under-19 Championship
Gold medal – first place	2013 Lithuania
- * Club domestic league appearances and goals as of 23:30, 22 November 2026 (UTC) ‡ National team caps and goals as of 22:48, 16 November 2026 (UTC)

Aleksandar Mitrović (Serbian Cyrillic: Александар Митровић, pronounced [aleksǎːndar mǐtroʋitɕ] (Note: The name Aleksandar in Serbian can also be pronounced [alěksaːndar], but the pronunciation [aleksǎːndar] is the one most commonly used in Serbia.); born 16 September 1994) is a Serbian professional footballer who plays as a striker for Qatar Stars League club Al Rayyan and captains the Serbia national team.

A youth product at Partizan, he turned professional after a loan at Teleoptik, and was a regular as they won the Serbian SuperLiga in his first season. At the age of 18, Mitrović was named among the top 10 talents under the age of 19 in Europe by a selection of UEFA reporters. He then joined Anderlecht for a club record €5 million, and scored 44 goals in 90 games across all competitions in a two-season spell. He won the Belgian Pro League in his first campaign at the club, and was the league's top scorer in his second. In 2015, he moved to Newcastle United for £13 million. In 2018, he was loaned to Fulham, and joined them permanently after helping them achieve promotion to the Premier League. He scored over 100 goals across his six seasons at the club, and he later moved abroad to Saudi Arabia and signed for Al Hilal in 2023.

Mitrović helped Serbia win the 2013 European Under-19 Championship, being voted the best player of the tournament. That same year, he played his first game for the senior national team and has since earned over 100 caps, representing Serbia at the 2018 and 2022 FIFA World Cup, as well as UEFA Euro 2024. With 64 goals, he is Serbia's all-time record goalscorer.

== Club career ==
=== Early years ===
Born in Smederevo, Mitrović came to Partizan and went through the youth system of the club. Before being promoted to the first team, he made his senior debut with their affiliated side Teleoptik in the 2011–12 season, scoring seven goals in 25 league matches.

=== Partizan ===
On 27 June 2012, Mitrović signed his first professional contract with Partizan, on a four-year contract. He made his official debut for the club in a Champions League qualifier against Maltese side Valletta, scoring a goal nine minutes after coming on as a substitute. On 23 August 2012, Mitrović scored a header against Tromsø in the Europa League play-off round. Three days later, he scored his first league goal in a home fixture against Jagodina. On 17 November 2012, Mitrović scored the opening goal in his first ever Eternal derby, which Partizan eventually lost 3–2. Five days later, he also scored in a 1–1 away draw with Azerbaijani side Neftchi Baku during the Europa League group stage. By the end of his debut season, Mitrović was Partizan's top scorer in all competitions with 15 goals in 36 appearances even though he was one of the youngest players of the team. Due to his displays, he earned a place in Jelen SuperLiga's Team of the Season selection. Additionally, Serbian sports portal Mozzart Sport rated Mitrović third out of the 25 best players in the national league for that season.

=== Anderlecht ===
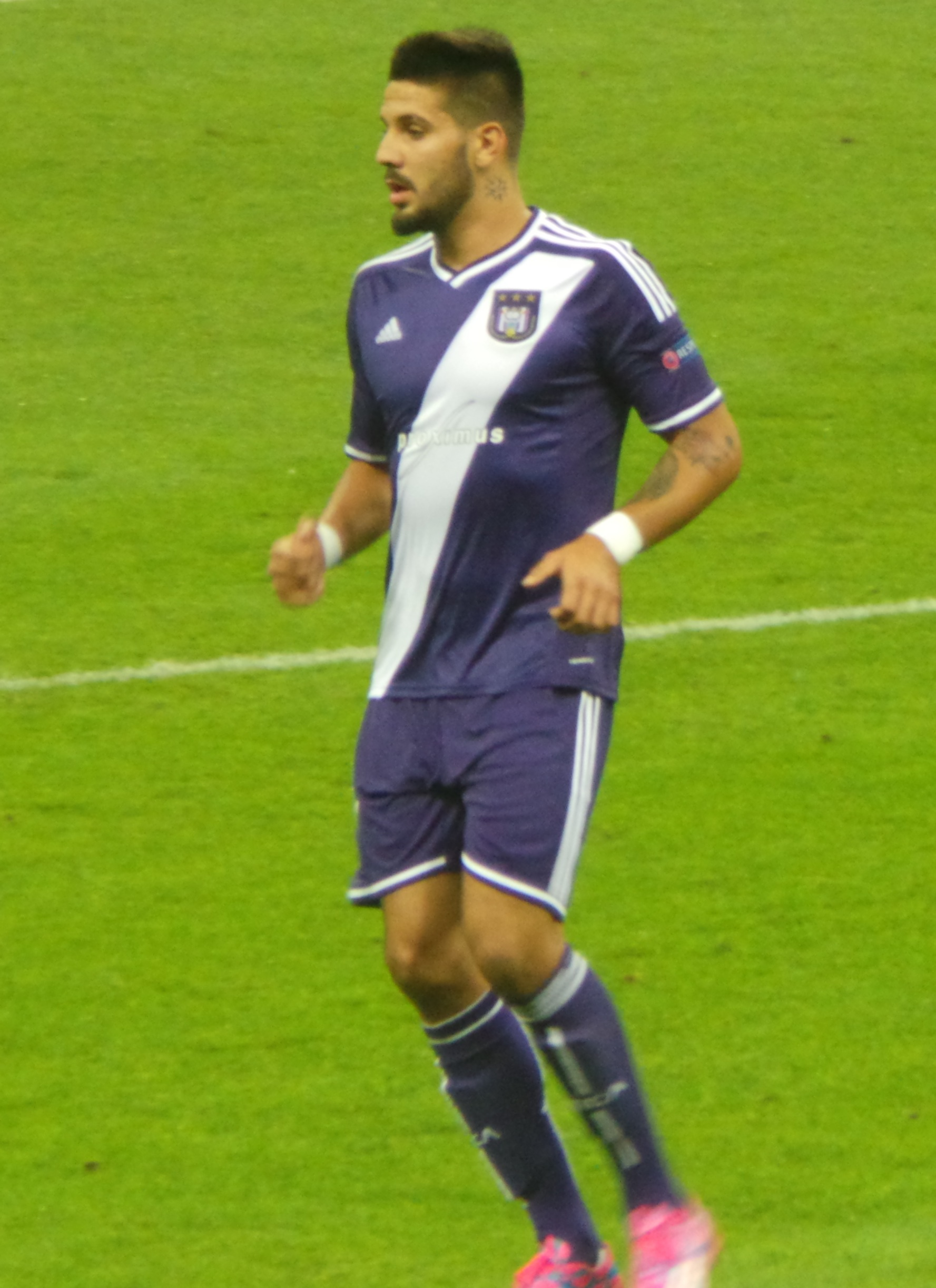
Mitrović playing for Anderlecht in 2014

On 12 August 2013, after much speculation, it was announced that Mitrović was sold to Anderlecht and that he would join the Belgian club on 30 August at the request of the player and his family. The transfer fee was €5 million, which is Anderlecht's record signing fee. On 1 September, Mitrović provided two assists on his debut for the club after coming on as a substitute at the beginning of the second half in a league match against Zulte Waregem.

On 10 December 2013, in the last round of the Champions League Group C against Olympiacos, Mitrović replaced goalkeeper Silvio Proto who had been sent off, but failed to save a penalty from Alejandro Domínguez. Mitrović ended his debut season in Belgium with 16 league goals as Anderlecht won their 33rd league title.

Mitrović began the 2014–15 season by scoring in Anderlecht's 2–1 Super Cup defeat of Lokeren. On 5 November 2014, in the Champions League Group D against Arsenal, he scored the equaliser in the 90th minute, completing Anderlecht's comeback from 3–0 to 3–3. Overall, he scored 20 goals in the Pro League, making him the competition's top scorer, and 28 in all competitions. On 22 March 2015, he scored the team's only goal in the 2–1 Belgian Cup Final loss to Club Brugge in Brussels.

=== Newcastle United ===
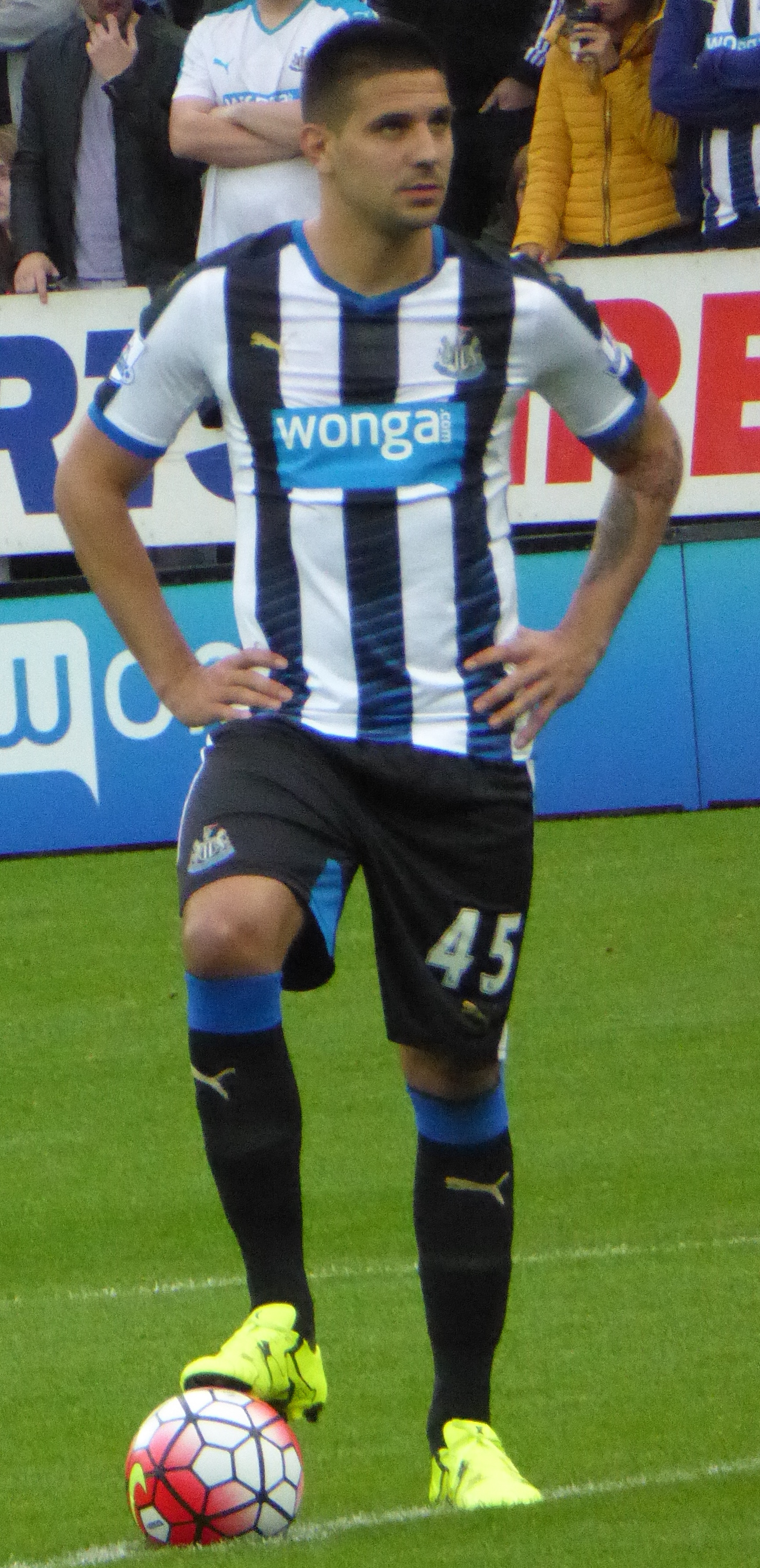
Mitrović playing for Newcastle United in 2015

On 21 July 2015, Mitrović joined Newcastle United on a five-year contract for a reported £13 million, saying he hoped to be able to play like club legend Alan Shearer. He made his debut on 9 August as Newcastle began the season with a 2–2 draw against Southampton at St James' Park, playing the final 15 minutes in place of Papiss Cissé. He was booked 22 seconds into his debut for a foul on Matt Targett. Twenty days later, he was sent off in the 15th minute of a 1–0 home defeat to Arsenal for a foul on Francis Coquelin. On 3 October, Mitrović scored his first Newcastle goal away to Manchester City, opening the scoring in a 6–1 loss.

On 20 March 2016, he headed the equaliser in a 1–1 draw against arch-rivals Sunderland in the Tyne–Wear derby. Mitrović was booked for taking off his shirt in celebration, and a fan who ran onto the pitch to celebrate with him was given a banning order. On 2 April, Mitrović scored two goals, one from a penalty, in a 3–2 defeat to Norwich City. On the final day of the season, and with Newcastle United already relegated, Mitrović scored the second goal in a 5–1 win over third-place Tottenham Hotspur, but was also sent off for a shin-high challenge on Kyle Walker. He became the sixth player in Premier League history to score a goal, assist a goal and get sent off in the same match.

After being suspended for the first four matches of the season as punishment for that red card, Mitrović made his season debut in the EFL Cup against Cheltenham on 23 August, but was forced off with a head injury in the first half. As a result, Mitrović had to wait until 13 September to make his Championship debut, scoring his first goal of the 2016–17 season at Queens Park Rangers, with the fifth goal in a 6–0 win. On 25 October, he bagged a brace and an assist in a 6–0 win over Preston North End, as the Magpies advanced to the EFL Cup quarter-finals. That weekend, Mitrović received his first league start since the match at Deepdale, and against the same opposition, he again scored a brace in a 2–1 win. Despite losing playing time to summer signing Dwight Gayle, Mitrović remained positive, saying "maybe last season I played more, but we are in good shape", as Newcastle arrived at the top of the table on 18 October.

On 7 January 2017, Mitrović started the FA Cup third round match against Birmingham City, but was injured in the buildup to the opening goal, scored by Daryl Murphy. On 11 February, Mitrović scored the only goal in a win over Wolverhampton Wanderers. However, he was substituted at half-time as a precaution, as he had been booked earlier in the match and could have been sent off for a challenge on Carl Ikeme. On 30 August, he was suspended for three matches, after an elbow to the head of West Ham's Manuel Lanzini was picked up by television cameras. On 21 October, Mitrović returned to the matchday squad in an eventual 1–0 win over Crystal Palace, having been left out for the previous two matches after his suspension. He came on as a 78th-minute substitute for Joselu to what was described as a "still surprising heroes welcome", but his first touch almost allowed Palace's Ruben Loftus-Cheek to take the lead for the visitors. In mid-December, Mitrović was ruled out with a back injury, which would sideline him for rest of the month and the following January. Towards the end of December, Mitrović stated in the Serbian sports daily Žurnal that he expected to leave the club in the January transfer window "to find the best solution for my career".

=== Fulham ===
On 1 February 2018, Mitrović joined Championship club Fulham on loan until the end of the season. In the build up to deadline day, Mitrović was poised to join Bordeaux and then former club Anderlecht, but both moves broke down, and after a discussion with their manager, the fellow Serb Slaviša Jokanović on Snapchat, he decided to join Fulham. On 3 February, Mitrović made his debut for the West London club in a 2–0 win over Nottingham Forest, and almost scored, but his headed effort was cleared off the line by Joe Worrall. On 21 February, Mitrović scored his first goal for the club in a 1–1 draw with Bristol City, kickstarting a run of form which saw him score six goals in four matches. In the six matches played by Fulham in April, Mitrović scored five times, including winning goals against Sheffield Wednesday and Sunderland. Due to his prolific run of form in March and April, he was the back-to-back Championship Player of the Month.

Mitrović finished the season with 12 goals, four behind top scorer Ryan Sessegnon, as Fulham missed out on automatic promotion on the final day, losing 3–1 to Birmingham City; their first league loss of the calendar year. The goal against Sunderland would prove to be his last for the club in his loan spell, as he did not score in the play-offs, but he did start in the play-off final, with Fulham beating Aston Villa 1–0.

On 30 July, Mitrović signed for Fulham permanently for an initial fee of £22 million, potentially rising to £27 million. He signed a five-year contract lasting to June 2023. On 18 August, he scored the equaliser in an eventual 3–1 loss to Tottenham Hotspur, with an inventive header from a low cross by Sessegnon. Mitrović scored three goals in Fulham's next two matches against Burnley and Brighton & Hove Albion, although it was his handball which resulted in a penalty for the latter side, converted by Glenn Murray. On 24 November, and Claudio Ranieri's first match in charge, Mitrović scored a brace in a 3–2 win over Southampton, ending a run of six league matches without a goal. On 29 December, against Huddersfield Town, Mitrović argued with Aboubakar Kamara over taking a penalty; Kamara's effort was saved by Jonas Lössl. Eight minutes later, he scored the only goal of the match. While Ranieri was angered by Kamara's decision to take the penalty, Mitrović was more forgiving of the Frenchman, referring to a similar incident he had while playing for Newcastle United. In January 2019, Kamara had another altercation with Mitrović during a yoga session at the club's training ground, leading to a series of events which saw the Frenchman leave the club on loan. On 29 January, Mitrović scored a brace against Brighton & Hove Albion. His second goal was his tenth of the season, and in doing so, he beat his previous best of nine goals in the Premier League. It was also his twentieth Premier League goal, and at that point, he had scored five goals each under the stewardship of his last four managers in McClaren, Benítez, Jokanović and Ranieri. However, he would not score again until winning and converting a penalty against AFC Bournemouth on 20 April, but by then, Fulham had been relegated from the Premier League.

On 9 July, he signed a new five-year contract, extending the deal until June 2024. Mitrović began the season in fine form, scoring five goals in six matches. In October, he went on another scoring run with six goals in five matches, including a hat-trick against Luton Town. He was later named Championship Player of the Month, tying the record with former teammate Dwight Gayle. He kept scoring throughout November and December, but on 11 January 2020, in a match against Hull City, he damaged his ankle ligaments and was ruled out for two to three weeks. He returned on 1 February against Huddersfield Town and scored Fulham's third goal in a 3–2 home win. This kickstarted another scoring run during the month, culminating with a stoppage-time winner over Swansea City, despite having his penalty saved by Freddie Woodman in the 89th minute. Due to the COVID-19 pandemic, Mitrović did not play for Fulham until the Championship resumed in June, and would be retrospectively banned for three matches for elbowing Ben White in the club's 3–0 loss to Leeds United. On 10 July, Mitrović returned to the team, winning and converting a penalty in a 2–0 win over Cardiff City. On 18 July, Mitrović scored twice and assisted for Bobby Decordova-Reid, in a 5–3 win over Sheffield Wednesday, to keep Fulham's slim hopes of automatic promotion alive. Like the 2018–19 season, the club missed out on the final day, drawing 1–1 with Wigan Athletic. Mitrović finished the season with twenty-six goals, alongside Brentford's Ollie Watkins; he won the physical version of the award as he scored the same number of goals in fewer minutes than Watkins. He did not appear in either legs of the play-off semi-final, but he played a part in the play-off final, providing the assist for Joe Bryan's second goal in Fulham's extra-time win over Brentford. On 3 September, he was named the Player of the Season by the club's supporters.

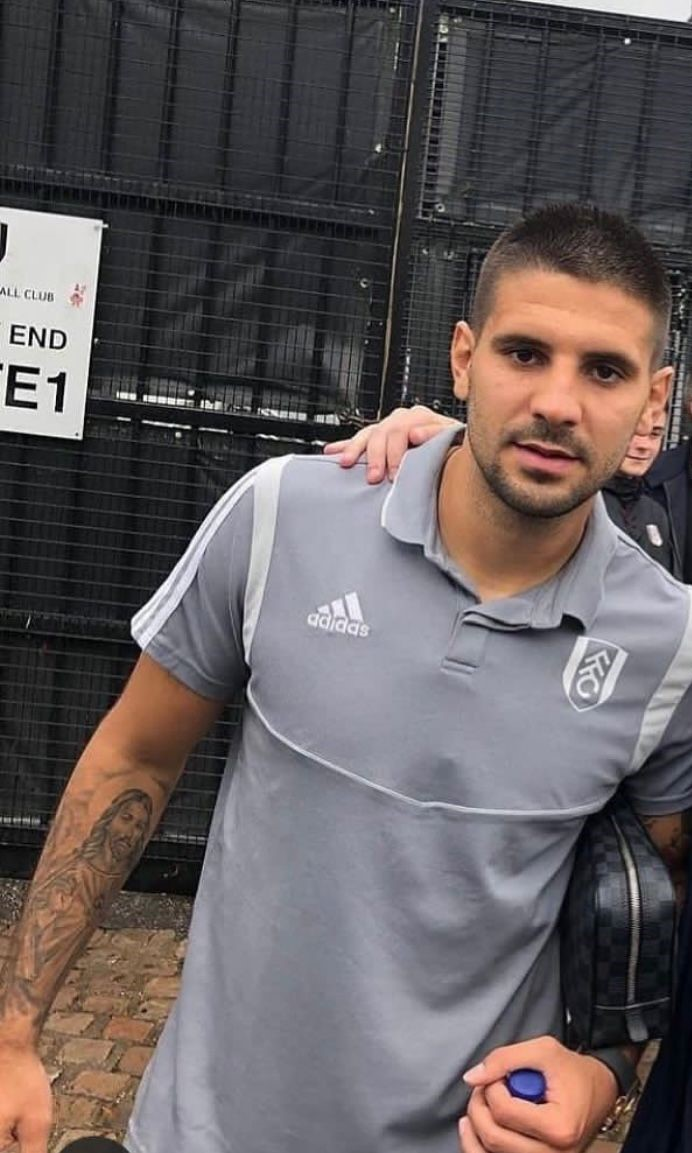
Mitrović pictured during his time at Fulham.

Mitrović scored his first goals of the season in a 4–3 defeat to Leeds on 19 September 2020, but went on a scoring drought that lasted until April 2021, in a 3–1 defeat to Aston Villa. The previous October, he had the opportunity to convert a penalty against Sheffield United, but hit his effort off the crossbar. Later in the match, he conceded a penalty when he tackled Jack Robinson, resulting in Billy Sharp scoring the equaliser. Mitrović spent much of the season in and out of the squad, missing matches due to tactical changes (where he was kept out by Ivan Cavaleiro and Ademola Lookman), various injuries, as well as testing positive for COVID-19.

==== 2021–22 season ====
Following Fulham's return to the Championship, Mitrović was reinstated into the starting line-up by new manager Marco Silva, and in August, he scored four goals in four consecutive matches. Towards the end of the month, he again extended his contract, with it lasting until the summer of 2026. On 29 September 2021, Mitrović scored his first hat-trick of the season, in a 3–1 home win over Swansea City, with all three goals coming in the first half of the game. His stellar start to the season continued into October as he scored eight goals, including another hat-trick, this time against West Bromwich Albion winning the Player of the Month award for his efforts.

Mitrović scored his third hat-trick of the season in an emphatic 6–2 home win over Bristol City on 15 January 2022, taking his goal tally to 27 league goals in just 24 games. On 12 February, Mitrović scored his 31st goal of the season with the only goal in a victory over Hull City, equalling the record for the most goals in a Championship season set by Ivan Toney the previous year with 16 matches still to play. He broke this record nine days later, scoring his 32nd and 33rd goals of the season in a 2–1 home win over Peterborough United.

On 19 April 2022, Mitrović scored his 39th and 40th league goals of the campaign in a 3–0 home win over Preston North End. The result confirmed Fulham's promotion back to the Premier League. On 24 April, Mitrović was voted EFL Championship Player of the Season at the annual EFL Awards. He was also named in the Team of the Season, alongside Fulham teammates Tosin Adarabioyo, Antonee Robinson and Harry Wilson.

In a 7–0 win against Luton Town on 2 May, Mitrović scored two goals to equal and then break the record of Guy Whittingham for the highest scoring English league season in the current 46 game format by scoring 43 goals in a season. The win also confirmed Fulham as the Championship winners.

==== 2022–23 season ====
On 6 August 2022, in Fulham's first match of the 2022–23 Premier League season, Mitrović scored both goals in a 2–2 home draw against Liverpool. He scored a 90th-minute winner in a 3–2 home win over Brentford on 20 August. He scored in a 2–1 defeat to Arsenal on 27 August, which was his 100th goal for Fulham while also beating his goal tally from the entire 2020–21 season in just four games. Mitrović scored his fifth goal of the season in a 2–1 home win over Brighton & Hove Albion, and four days later scored his sixth goal in six Premier League games in a 2–1 away defeat at Tottenham Hotspur. After picking up an injury on international duty with Serbia, Mitrović was only able to manage 37 minutes before being substituted for Carlos Vinícius. Mitrović returned to the Fulham team after missing one game; a 3–1 away loss at West Ham United, and scored a penalty to equalise in a 2–2 draw with fellow newly promoted AFC Bournemouth, and scored in the next two consecutive games, a 3–0 and 3–2 wins over Aston Villa and Leeds United respectively. Mitrović missed the last two Premier League games before the World Cup break, which Fulham lost 2–1 in both games, to the two Manchester clubs.

Following the World Cup break, Mitrović continued his fine goalscoring form, scoring in a 3–0 away win at Crystal Palace, before missing a 96th-minute penalty in a 2–1 win over Southampton. He ended 2022 scoring 31 goals in 35 games across the EFL Championship and Premier League and started 2023 in the same fashion, scoring the only goal in a 1–0 away win at Leicester, helping Fulham to their third consecutive Premier League win for the first time since 2009, although his fifth yellow card, picked up for a second-half foul on Harvey Barnes, ruled him out for the Cottagers' game against Chelsea later that month.

On 19 March, in Fulham's FA Cup quarter-final match against Manchester United, Mitrović was sent off after arguing with and pushing the referee, Chris Kavanagh, following a handball decision that saw teammate Willian and manager Marco Silva both sent off. The red cards proved to be the game's turning point, as Fulham were 1–0 up at the time. United scored from the penalty that was given for Willian's handball and went on to win 3–1. He was charged with violent and improper conduct by the Football Association, and on 4 April, he received an eight-game ban. The Football Association appealed the decision on the grounds that the punishment was not harsh enough given Mitrovic's conduct, but the FA's appeal was rejected.

=== Al-Hilal ===
On 19 August 2023, Mitrović joined Saudi club Al Hilal from Fulham for a club record transfer fee of £50m. Five days later, he scored a goal on his debut in a 4–0 win over Al Raed. On 1 September, he scored his first hat-trick at the club in a 4–3 away win over Al-Ittihad. On 23 October 2023, Mitrović scored his first AFC Champions League hat-trick against Indian side, Mumbai City in a massive 6–0 home win. Mitrovic scored 40 goals in 43 games in his first season at Al Hilal.

In the 2024–25 season, he missed significant periods of action and was unable to feature in the 2025 FIFA Club World Cup.

=== Al Rayyan ===
On 4 September 2025, Mitrović signed for Qatar Stars League side Al Rayyan. Later that month, on 13 September, he made his debut, scoring a goal in the stoppage time of a 1–1 draw with Qatar SC.

== International career ==
=== Youth ===
With four goals, Mitrović was the top scorer of the Serbian national team in their successful qualifying campaign for the 2012 UEFA European Under-19 Championship. On 3 July 2012, the opening day of the final tournament, he was sent off during a match against France U19, which caused him to miss the rest of the competition due to suspension. On 26 March 2013, Mitrović scored two goals in a friendly for Serbia's U21 team against Bulgaria U21.

Mitrović was called up by Serbia U19 coach Ljubinko Drulović for two qualification matches for the 2013 UEFA European Under-19 Championship taking place after his debut with the senior national side against Belgium. Mitrović was also a member of the squad that traveled to Lithuania for the final tournament, where he established himself as one of the key players in Serbia's U19 team which won the competition for the first time in the history of Serbian football. He contributed by scoring a goal and providing two assists during the contest (including one in the final match against France U19). Mitrović was also named the tournament's Golden Player for his performances.

=== Senior ===
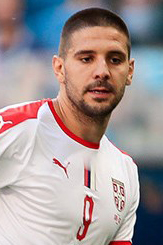
Mitrović playing for Serbia at the 2018 FIFA World Cup

Mitrović earned his first call up to the Serbian senior national team by coach Siniša Mihajlović for a 2014 FIFA World Cup qualifier against Belgium. He played 69 minutes on his debut on 7 June 2013 and earned a yellow card after stepping on Axel Witsel's foot, before being replaced by Marko Šćepović. On 6 September, Mitrović scored his first goal for the senior side in a 1–1 home draw against Croatia in another World Cup qualifier. Two years and one day later, he scored his next international goal, the consolation in a 2–1 friendly defeat against France at the Nouveau Stade de Bordeaux, Serbia's 100th match as an independent nation.

In the 2018 FIFA World Cup qualifiers, Mitrović scored three goals in two matches to ensure Serbia were still in contention to qualify from their group. On 9 October 2016, he scored a brace in a 3–2 win against Austria, and on 12 November, he scored the equaliser against Wales in a 1–1 draw. He continued this scoring run in 2017, with goals against Georgia, Wales, and Moldova, putting him ahead of teammate Dušan Tadić as the group's top goalscorer.

In May 2018, he was named in Serbia's preliminary squad for the 2018 FIFA World Cup in Russia, and on 1 June, made the final 23-man squad. Prior to the tournament, Mitrović scored a hat-trick in a 5–1 win over Bolivia. On 22 June, he scored the opening goal in an eventual 2–1 loss to Switzerland. He was also involved in a penalty claim when Swiss defenders Stephan Lichtsteiner and Fabian Schär dragged him to the ground in the box, but referee Felix Brych turned down the appeal. He played all three group stage matches.

Later that year, on 11 October, he scored a brace in a 2–0 UEFA Nations League victory over neighbouring nation Montenegro in the first match between the two countries since their split in 2006. The following month against the same opposition, he spurned the chance to score another brace, but missed a penalty, by attempting a panenka kick (coincidentally in the same stadium that Antonín Panenka scored the winning penalty for Czechoslovakia in the UEFA Euro 1976 Final). From June to November 2019, he began a scoring run, with eleven goals in seven matches. The majority of these came during Serbia's qualifying group for UEFA Euro 2020, including braces both home and away against Lithuania and Luxembourg.

On 12 November 2020, in a Euro 2020 qualifying play-off against Scotland that ended in a 1–1 draw after extra time, Mitrović went on to take Serbia's fifth penalty and missed it as the penalty shoot-out ended 5–4 in Scotland's favour, thus denying his national team qualification for the tournament. On 27 March 2021, he scored Serbia's first goal in a 2–2 draw with Portugal, thereby surpassing the previous record of 38 goals by Stjepan Bobek, and becoming the highest goalscorer in the history of the national side.

On 14 November 2021, Mitrović scored a last minute winner against Portugal, sending Serbia to the 2022 FIFA World Cup with a 2–1 victory. In November 2022, he was selected in Serbia's squad for the 2022 FIFA World Cup in Qatar. He played in all three group stage matches against Brazil, Cameroon, and Switzerland. He scored against both Cameroon and Switzerland as Serbia finished fourth in Group G.

Mitrović was part of the Serbia squad for UEFA Euro 2024 and started as a captain in the team's opening match of the tournament against England, ending in the 1–0 loss for the Serbs in Gelsenkirchen.

On 10 June 2025, he recorded the fourth international hat-trick of his career in a 2026 FIFA World Cup qualification against Andorra in Leskovac. That match also marked his 100th appearance for the Serbia national team.

== Personal life ==
Mitrović has two children with partner Kristina Janjić. He is a lifelong supporter of both Partizan and Newcastle United.

== Career statistics ==
=== Club ===
As of match played 22 November 2026

Appearances and goals by club, season and competition
Club	Season	League			National cup (Note: Includes Serbian Cup, Belgian Cup, FA Cup, King's Cup, Amir of Qatar Cup)		League cup (Note: Includes Football League/EFL Cup, QSL Cup)		Continental		Other		Total	
Club	Season	Division	Apps	Goals	Apps	Goals	Apps	Goals	Apps	Goals	Apps	Goals	Apps	Goals
Teleoptik	2011–12	Serbian First League	25	7	1	0	—		—		—		26	7
Partizan	2012–13	Serbian Superliga	25	10	2	2	—		9 (Note: Two appearances and one goal in UEFA Champions League, seven appearances and two goals in UEFA Europa League)	3	—		36	15
Partizan	2013–14	Serbian Superliga	3	3	—		—		3 (Note: One appearance in UEFA Champions League, two appearances in UEFA Europa League)	0	—		6	3
Partizan	Total		28	13	2	2	—		12	3	—		42	18
Anderlecht	2013–14	Belgian Pro League	32	16	1	0	—		6 (Note: Appearances in UEFA Champions League)	0	—		39	16
Anderlecht	2014–15	Belgian Pro League	37	20	6	4	—		7 (Note: Five appearances and two goals in UEFA Champions League, two appearances and one goal in UEFA Europa League)	3	1 (Note: Appearance in Belgian Super Cup)	1	51	28
Anderlecht	Total		69	36	7	4	—		13	3	1	1	90	44
Newcastle United	2015–16	Premier League	34	9	1	0	1	0	—		—		36	9
Newcastle United	2016–17	Championship	25	4	2	0	2	2	—		—		29	6
Newcastle United	2017–18	Premier League	6	1	0	0	1	1	—		—		7	2
Newcastle United	Total		65	14	3	0	4	3	—		—		72	17
Fulham (loan)	2017–18	Championship	17	12	—		—		—		3 (Note: Appearance(s) in Championship play-offs)	0	20	12
Fulham	2018–19	Premier League	37	11	1	0	1	0	—		—		39	11
Fulham	2019–20	Championship	40	26	0	0	0	0	—		1	0	41	26
Fulham	2020–21	Premier League	27	3	2	0	2	1	—		—		31	4
Fulham	2021–22	Championship	44	43	2	0	0	0	—		—		46	43
Fulham	2022–23	Premier League	24	14	4	1	0	0	—		—		28	15
Fulham	2023–24	Premier League	1	0	—		—		—		—		1	0
Fulham	Total		190	109	9	1	3	1	—		4	0	206	111
Al Hilal	2023–24	Saudi Pro League	28	28	5	4	—		10 (Note: Appearances in AFC Champions League)	8	0	0	43	40
Al Hilal	2024–25	Saudi Pro League	23	19	3	0	—		8	6	2 (Note: Appearances in Saudi Super Cup)	3	36	28
Al Hilal	Total		51	47	8	4	—		18	14	2	3	79	68
Al Rayyan	2025–26	Qatar Stars League	11	5	2	1	1	1	—		5 (Note: Appearances in AGCFF Gulf Club Champions League)	5	19	12
Al Rayyan	2026–27	Qatar Stars League	5	3	0	0	0	0	3	1	0	0	8	4
Al Rayyan	Total		16	8	2	1	1	1	3	1	5	5	27	16
Career total			444	234	32	12	8	5	46	21	12	9	545	281

=== International ===
As of match played 16 November 2026

Appearances and goals by national team and year
National team	Year	Apps	Goals
Serbia	2013	3	1
Serbia	2014	7	0
Serbia	2015	8	1
Serbia	2016	8	5
Serbia	2017	7	4
Serbia	2018	13	12
Serbia	2019	9	11
Serbia	2020	6	2
Serbia	2021	8	8
Serbia	2022	10	8
Serbia	2023	8	5
Serbia	2024	11	2
Serbia	2025	6	4
Serbia	2026	4	1
Total		108	64

== Honours ==
Partizan

- Serbian SuperLiga: 2012–13

Anderlecht

- Belgian Pro League: 2013–14
- Belgian Super Cup: 2014

Newcastle United

- EFL Championship: 2016–17

Fulham

- EFL Championship: 2021–22; play-offs: 2018, 2020

Al Hilal

- Saudi Pro League: 2023–24
- King's Cup: 2023–24
- Saudi Super Cup: 2023, 2024

Al Rayyan

- QSL Cup: 2025–26
- AGCFF Gulf Club Champions League: 2025–26

Serbia U19

- UEFA European Under-19 Championship: 2013

Individual

- Serbian SuperLiga Team of the Season: 2012–13
- UEFA European Under-19 Championship Golden Player: 2013
- UEFA European Under-19 Championship Team of the Tournament: 2013
- Belgian Pro League top scorer: 2014–15
- EFL Championship Player of the Month: March 2018, April 2018, October 2019, October 2021
- Serbian Footballer of the Year: 2018, 2022, 2023
- UEFA Nations League top scorer: 2018–19, 2022–23
- Fulham Player of the Year: 2019–20, 2021–22
- PFA Team of the Year: 2019–20 Championship, 2021–22 Championship
- EFL Championship Golden Boot: 2019–20, 2021–22
- PFA Fans' Player of the Year: 2021–22 Championship
- EFL Championship Team of the Season: 2021–22
- EFL Championship Player of the Season: 2021–22
- Saudi Pro League Player of the Month: September 2024
- King's Cup top scorer: 2023–24

== See also ==
- List of top international men's football goal scorers by country
- List of men's footballers with 50 or more international goals
- List of men's footballers with 100 or more international caps
