= Dan Thomas (footballer) =

English footballer (born 1991)

Personal information
- Full name: Daniel Anthony Thomas
- Date of birth: 1 September 1991 (age 35)
- Place of birth: Poole, England
- Height: 1.88 m (6 ft 2 in)
- Position: Goalkeeper

Youth career
- –2009: Bournemouth

Senior career*
Years	Team	Apps	(Gls)
2009–2012	Bournemouth	3	(0)
2011	→ Dorchester Town (loan)	10	(0)
2011	→ Welling United (loan)	19	(0)
2012	→ AFC Totton (loan)	1	(0)
2012–2013	Havant & Waterlooville	11	(0)
2013–2014	Poole Town	22	(0)
2014–2017	Aldershot Town	11	(0)
2017–2019	Gosport Borough	3	(0)
2019–20??	Southend United	61	(0)
Total		141	(0)
- * Club domestic league appearances and goals

Daniel Anthony Thomas (born 1 September 1991) is a former English professional footballer who played as a goalkeeper.

== Career ==
Thomas signed an apprentice contract with AFC Bournemouth in May 2008. He made his debut on 6 October 2009 for Bournemouth in their 2–1 away defeat to Northampton Town in the Football League Trophy Southern Section Second Round. Thomas commented, "I was chuffed to bits when I was told I was going to make my debut...I felt I did ok, but was just so disappointed to be on the losing side". He made his debut in the Football League on 5 December as a second-half substitute, replacing the injured Shwan Jalal, and kept a clean sheet as Bournemouth beat Shrewsbury Town 1–0 in Football League Two. On 4 February 2011, Thomas joined Dorchester Town on loan. He made his debut the next day in a 1–0 win over Weston-Super-Mare. He was recalled from his loan spell on 12 April 2011 after his parent club terminated the contract of the club's second choice goalkeeper Jon Stewart.

On 6 January 2012, Thomas joined Southern Football League Premier Division side AFC Totton on a month's loan. On 16 March 2012, it was announced that Thomas had joined Conference South side Havant & Waterlooville.

Thomas joined Aldershot Town on non-contract terms in August 2014 after impressing whilst on trial in pre-season.

== Personal life ==
Thomas attended Portchester School, in Bournemouth and Brockenhurst College in Brockenhurst.

He has two younger brothers.
