= Dwight Jaynes =

American journalist

Dwight Jaynes is an American journalist and sportswriter in Portland, Oregon. He was a sports columnist with The Oregonian newspaper for several years. In 2001, he left to become president and write a column in the fledgling Portland Tribune and to do a daily radio show for KPAM, a talk radio station owned by the same company as the Tribune. He left his radio role and worked full-time for the Tribune, serving as the paper's editor and sports columnist until leaving at the end of July 2008.

Jaynes has been highly critical of the management of the NBA's Portland Trail Blazers franchise under the ownership of Paul Allen, particularly over the hiring and performance of Maurice Cheeks as head coach. He is also a persistent advocate for bringing Major League Baseball to Portland and a persistent critic of the NCAA.

He co-authored two books, "The Long Hot Winter" with former Blazer coach Rick Adelman and "Against the World" with fellow Tribune journalist Kerry Eggers. He has five times been named Oregon's Sports Writer of the Year and was named Oregon's Sportscaster of the Year for 2013—the first person in the state to win both awards. He has received the DNA Award for contributions to sports from the Oregon Sports Awards and was inducted into the state of Oregon Sports Hall of Fame in 2010.

Jaynes co-hosted the Morning Sports Page on KXTG 95.5 The Game with Chad Doing and Antonio Harvey until 2011, when he began working full-time for Comcast SportsNet Northwest.
