= Mark Molesley =

English footballer (born 1981)

Personal information
- Full name: Mark Clifford Molesley
- Date of birth: 11 March 1981 (age 45)
- Place of birth: Hillingdon, England
- Height: 6 ft 1 in (1.85 m)
- Position: Midfielder

Senior career*
Years	Team	Apps	(Gls)
1999–2005	Hayes	167	(16)
2005–2006	Cambridge City	30	(7)
2006-2007	Aldershot Town	33	(1)
2007–2008	Stevenage Borough	11	(0)
2008–2009	Grays Athletic	10	(2)
2008–2009	→ AFC Bournemouth (loan)	9	(2)
2009–2013	AFC Bournemouth	43	(3)
2012	→ Aldershot Town (loan)	8	(0)
2012–2013	→ Plymouth Argyle (loan)	5	(0)
2013	Exeter City	11	(0)
2013–2015	Aldershot Town	40	(8)
2015–2017	Weymouth		
Total		367+	(39+)

International career
2005–2008	England C	4	(0)

Managerial career
- 2015: AFC Bournemouth U15
- 2016–2017: Weymouth (player-coach)
- 2016–2020: AFC Bournemouth U21 (assistant manager)
- 2017: Weymouth (caretaker)
- 2017–2020: Weymouth
- 2020–2021: Southend United
- 2021–2022: Aldershot Town
- 2022–2023: Gosport Borough
- 2023–2024: Hayes & Yeading United
- 2024: Weymouth
- * Club domestic league appearances and goals

Mark Clifford Molesley (born 11 March 1981) is an English football manager and former professional player. He played in the Football League for AFC Bournemouth, Aldershot Town, Plymouth Argyle and Exeter City, and the Football Conference for Hayes, Cambridge City, Aldershot Town, Stevenage Borough and Grays Athletic.

== Playing career ==
Molesley started his career with Hayes, coming through their youth system. Spells with Cambridge City, Aldershot Town, Stevenage Borough and Grays Athletic followed before a transfer to AFC Bournemouth.

He made his debut for AFC Bournemouth, away to Shrewsbury Town, in a 4–1 defeat in the League Two on 18 October 2008.

Molesley signed for Exeter City on 18 January 2013. On 30 April 2013, he was released by Exeter due to the expiry of his contract.

== Managerial career ==
Molesley Began his coaching career in 2015 by coaching AFC Bournemouth under 15's.

Whilst playing for Weymouth in 2016, Molesley became a player-coach for the team.

Molesley became the manager of League Two club Southend United on 13 August 2020 on a three-year contract. After seven months, on 9 April 2021 Molesley was sacked by Southend United following a period of poor results and the club in 23rd place in the league.

On 20 September 2021, Molesley returned to Aldershot Town as manager on a deal until the end of the 2022–23 season. Tom Prodomo joined as assistant manager after previously working with Molesley at Weymouth and Southend. Molesley was also joined by Terry Brown who had previously managed both the Shots and Molesley himself.

On 15 October 2022, Molesley was sacked by Aldershot Town following a 2-0 defeat to Chelmsford City in the 2022–23 FA Cup 4th qualifying round.

On 30 November 2022, Molesley was appointed Director of Football of Gosport Borough, taking control of the first-team as well as wider football operations. He departed the club at the end of the season.

In October 2023, Molesley was appointed manager of Southern League Premier Division South club Hayes & Yeading United.

On 1 April 2024, Molesley returned to National League South side Weymouth for a second spell in charge. Due to poor league form, Molesley was sacked by Weymouth on 28 November 2024.

== Personal life ==
Molesley married his partner, Charlene, in 2009. He lives in Bournemouth and Rickmansworth.

== Career statistics ==
Appearances and goals by club, season and competition
Club	Season	League			FA Cup		League Cup		Other (Note: Appearances and goals in the Football League Trophy)		Total	
Club	Season	Division	Apps	Goals	Apps	Goals	Apps	Goals	Apps	Goals	Apps	Goals
Hayes	1999–2000	Conference	1	0	0	0	0	0	0	0	1	0
Hayes	2000–01	Conference	23	1	1	0	0	0	1	0	25	1
Hayes	2001–02	Conference	34	5	1	0	0	0	0	0	35	5
Hayes	2002–03	Isthmian League Premier Division	39	4	0	0	0	0	0	0	39	4
Hayes	2003–04	Isthmian League Premier Division	39	4	0	0	0	0	0	0	39	4
Hayes	2004–05	Conference South	31	2	1	0	0	0	0	0	32	2
Hayes	Total		167	16	3	0	0	0	1	0	171	16
Cambridge City	2005–06	Conference	30	7	0	0	0	0	0	0	30	7
Aldershot Town	2006–07	Conference	33	1	5	0	0	0	0	0	38	1
Stevenage Borough	2007–08	Conference	11	0	1	0	0	0	0	0	12	0
Grays Athletic	2008–09	Conference	10	2	0	0	0	0	0	0	10	2
AFC Bournemouth (loan)	2008–09	League Two	9	2	2	0	0	0	1	0	12	2
AFC Bournemouth	2008–09	League Two	20	2	0	0	0	0	0	0	20	2
AFC Bournemouth	2009–10	League Two	10	1	0	0	1	0	1	0	12	1
AFC Bournemouth	2010–11	League One	2	0	0	0	0	0	0	0	2	0
AFC Bournemouth	2011–12	League One	11	0	0	0	2	0	1	0	14	0
AFC Bournemouth	2012–13	League One	0	0	0	0	0	0	0	0	0	0
AFC Bournemouth	Total		43	3	0	0	3	0	2	0	48	3
Aldershot Town (loan)	2011–12	League Two	8	0	0	0	0	0	0	0	8	0
Plymouth Argyle (loan)	2012–13	League Two	5	0	0	0	0	0	1	0	6	0
Exeter City	2012–13	League Two	11	0	0	0	0	0	0	0	11	0
Career total			327	31	11	0	3	0	5	0	346	31

== Managerial record ==
As of match played 26 November 2024

Managerial record by team and tenure
Team	From	To	Record					Ref.
Team	From	To	P	W	D	L	Win %	Ref.
Weymouth	22 April 2017	13 August 2020	155	91	36	28	58.7	
Southend United	13 August 2020	9 April 2021	45	8	13	24	17.78	
Aldershot Town	21 September 2021	15 October 2022	55	14	11	30	25.5	
Gosport Borough	30 November 2022	6 May 2023	23	9	4	10	39.1	
Hayes & Yeading United	11 October 2023	28 March 2024	23	5	9	9	21.7	
Weymouth	1 April 2024	28 November 2024	28	5	9	14	17.9	
Total			319	122	82	115	38.2	—
