= 2015–16 Newport County A.F.C. season =

Welsh association football club season

Newport County A.F.C.
2015–16 season
- Owner: Newport County AFC Supporters Trust
- Chairman: Tony Pring (interim)
- Manager: Terry Butcher until 1 October 2015; John Sheridan until 13 January 2016; Warren Feeney from 15 January 2016
- Stadium: Rodney Parade
- League Two: 22nd
- FA Cup: Third round
- League Cup: First round
- League Trophy: First round
- Top goalscorer: League: Scott Boden (13); All: Scott Boden (15)
- Highest home attendance: 5,083 v Blackburn Rovers (18 January 2016), FA Cup round 3
- Lowest home attendance: 1,434 v Swindon Town (1 September 2015), Football League Trophy round 1
- Average home league attendance: 2,731
Home colours	Away colours	Third colours

The 2015–16 season was Newport County's third consecutive season in League Two and 63rd season in the Football League. The season covered the period from 1 July 2015 to 30 June 2016. It was their 95th season of league football and 27th since reforming in 1989. They finished the season in 22nd place. The club also participated in the FA Cup, League Cup and League Trophy, reaching Round 3 of the FA Cup for the first time since 1986.

== Season Review ==
=== League ===
Former England Manager Terry Butcher had been announced as manager in April 2015, but his tenure lasted just ten games of the 2015–16 season. On 1 October 2015 Newport County Supporters' Trust took over ownership of the club with Tony Pring appointed interim chairman. Butcher was sacked on the same day, with Newport bottom of League Two after gaining just five points from the first 10 matches of the 2015–16 season. John Sheridan was appointed team manager on 2 October. Sheridan managed to get County out of the relegation places and up to 20th in the table by 12 January 2016 when he was poached by former club Oldham Athletic. He had enjoyed a ten-match unbeaten run in all competitions between 20 October and 5 December, with an overall record of five wins, five defeats and seven draws from 17 games in charge. After three defeats and a draw in his last four games he left with County just three points above the relegation zone. Assistant manager Warren Feeney was announced as manager on 15 January. Feeney's tenure started with a win at York City, but he only managed another five wins in the rest of the season. County had risen as high as 17th in the table following the 3–0 win at Portsmouth and 0–0 draw home to Hartlepool United, but a disastrous spell of six straight defeats left them in 22nd place 11 points clear of relegation with 12 left to play for. A 1–1 draw with Oxford United combined with York's win at Portsmouth put County nine points ahead with nine to play for, but with an 11 superior goal difference. Any relegation doubts were extinguished by Newport's 1–1 draw at Luton. However the bad results continued for the remainder of the season and into the next, which ultimately cost Feeny his job. Newport lost the last two games of this season and failed to score a single goal, finishing in 22nd place.

=== Cup ===
In the first round of the League Cup, Newport travelled to Wolverhampton Wanderers. Despite taking the lead in the 6th minute, the scores were level by the 15th, with County eventually losing 2–1 due to a 58th-minute Wolves penalty.

In the League Trophy Newport were home to Swindon Town. With the game finishing 1–1 it entered a penalty shootout. With Aaron Collins missing the seventh penalty and Will Randall scoring his, Swindon went through 7–6.

In the FA Cup, County were drawn away in the first round to Conference North qualifiers Brackley Town. Newport were leading 2–1 in stoppage time, until former County player Curtis McDonald headed home a 95th-minute equaliser to force a replay. That game was won 4–1 to set up a second round game with fellow League Two side Barnet. Newport recorded a 1–0 victory at The Hive to progress to the third round for the first time since 1986. The third-round game at home to Championship side Blackburn Rovers started in the worst possible way for County with Rovers taking the lead thanks to an 8th-minute penalty. Mark Byrne equalised for County from 25 yards on 30 minutes to leave the scores 1–1 at half time. With 15 minutes remaining in the game Jordan Rhodes scored the winner for Rovers to send them into the 4th round.

=== Results summary ===
Overall								Home						Away					
Pld	W	D	L	GF	GA	GD	Pts	W	D	L	GF	GA	GD	W	D	L	GF	GA	GD
46	10	13	23	43	64	−21	43	4	8	11	21	35	−14	6	5	12	22	29	−7

Last updated: 7 May 2016.

=== Results by round ===
Round	1	2	3	4	5	6	7	8	9	10	11	12	13	14	15	16	17	18	19	20	21	22	23	24	25	26	27	28	29	30	31	32	33	34	35	36	37	38	39	40	41	42	43	44	45	46
Ground	A	H	A	H	A	H	H	A	A	H	H	A	H	A	A	H	A	H	A	H	A	H	A	H	A	H	A	A	H	A	H	A	H	H	A	H	H	A	H	A	H	A	H	A	H	A
Result	L	D	L	L	L	L	L	D	W	L	D	L	L	W	W	D	D	D	D	W	L	D	L	L	W	D	L	W	W	D	W	L	W	L	W	D	L	L	L	L	L	L	D	D	L	L
Position	22	20	21	23	24	24	24	24	24	24	24	24	24	24	22	21	21	21	21	21	21	20	20	20	20	20	20	20	20	20	19	19	19	19	18	17	17	17	18	21	21	22	22	22	22	22

Updated to match(es) played on 7 May 2016. Source: bbc.co.uk
A = Away; H = Home; W = Win; D = Draw; L = Loss

== Transfers ==
=== Transfers in ===
Date from	Position	Nationality	Name	From	Fee	Ref.
1 July 2015	MF	ENG	Tom Owen-Evans	Academy	Trainee	
1 July 2015	MF	ENG	Kieran Parselle	Academy	Trainee	
1 July 2015	DF	WAL	Scott Barrow	Macclesfield Town	Free transfer	
1 July 2015	GK	WAL	Rhys Taylor	Macclesfield Town	Free transfer	
1 July 2015	FW	ENG	Lenell John-Lewis	Grimsby Town	Free transfer	
1 July 2015	MF	ENG	Alex Rodman	Gateshead	Free transfer	
1 July 2015	DF	ENG	Danny Holmes	Tranmere Rovers	Free transfer	
1 July 2015	DF	ENG	Nathan Ralph	Yeovil Town	Free transfer	
1 July 2015	DF	GHA	Seth Nana Twumasi	Yeovil Town	Free transfer	
1 July 2015	MF	ZAI	Medy Elito	VVV-Venlo	Free transfer	
6 July 2015	DF	ENG	Matt Taylor	Cheltenham Town	Free transfer	
13 July 2015	FW	ENG	Scott Boden	FC Halifax Town	Free transfer	
1 September 2015	DF	ENG	Matt Partridge	Basingstoke Town	Free transfer	
6 November 2015	GK	ENG	Joe Green	Unattached	Free transfer	
21 January 2016	FW	FRA	John-Christophe Ayina	Unattached	Free transfer	
25 January 2016	DF	WAL	Darren Jones	Unattached	Free transfer	
10 February 2016	FW	MSR	Dean Morgan	Unattached	Free transfer	
18 February 2016	FW	ENG	Tom Meechan	St Neots Town	Undisclosed	

=== Loans in ===
Date from	Position	Nationality	Name	From	Date until	Ref.
6 August 2015	DF	ENG	Aaron Hayden	Wolverhampton Wanderers	10 October 2015	
19 August 2015	MF	ENG	Josh Laurent	Brentford	8 October 2015	
20 August 2015	FW	ENG	Zak Ansah	Charlton Athletic	13 December 2015	
24 September 2015	FW	ENG	Tyler Blackwood	Queens Park Rangers	24 October 2015	
24 September 2015	DF	LCA	Janoi Donacien	Aston Villa	End of season	
8 October 2015	MF	ENG	Scot Bennett	Notts County	31 December 2015	
13 October 2015	DF	ENG	Jazzi Barnum-Bobb	Cardiff City	7 January 2016	
13 October 2015	MF	WAL	Tommy O'Sullivan	Cardiff City	7 January 2016	
26 November 2015	FW	SCO	Oli McBurnie	Swansea City	24 December 2015	
7 January 2016	DF	ENG	Ben Davies	Preston North End	End of season	
7 January 2016	MF	ENG	Connor Dymond	Crystal Palace	14 February 2016	
15 January 2016	GK	ENG	Mitchell Beeney	Chelsea	25 February 2016	
21 January 2016	FW	ENG	Deane Smalley	Plymouth Argyle	End of season	
21 January 2016	FW	IRE	Conor Wilkinson	Bolton Wanderers	20 March 2016	
26 February 2016	MF	GIB	Jake Gosling	Bristol Rovers	29 March 2016	
11 March 2016	MF	WAL	Tommy O'Sullivan	Cardiff City	End of season	
24 March 2016	FW	CIV	Souleymane Coulibaly	Peterborough United	End of season	

=== Transfers out ===
Date from	Position	Nationality	Name	To	Fee	Ref.
1 September 2015	CB	IRL	Kevin Feely	Free agent	Mutual consent	
1 September 2015	CB	WAL	Regan Poole	Manchester United	Undisclosed	
22 January 2016	FW	WAL	Aaron Collins	Wolverhampton Wanderers	Undisclosed	
1 February 2016	DF	ENG	Matt Taylor	Free agent	Released	
10 May 2016	GK	ENG	Joe Green	Free agent	Released	
10 May 2016	GK	WAL	Rhys Taylor	Free agent	Released	
10 May 2016	DF	WAL	Scott Barrow	Free agent	Released	
10 May 2016	DF	ENG	Matt Partridge	Free agent	Released	
10 May 2016	DF	GHA	Seth Nana Twumasi	Free agent	Released	
10 May 2016	DF	ENG	Nathan Ralph	Free agent	Released	
10 May 2016	MF	ENG	Yan Klukowski	Free agent	Released	
10 May 2016	FW	MSR	Dean Morgan	Free agent	Released	
6 June 2016	DF	WAL	Andrew Hughes	Free agent	Released	
9 June 2016	FW	ENG	Scott Boden	Free agent	Released	
13 June 2016	FW	FRA	John-Christophe Ayina	Free agent	Released	
13 June 2016	MF	ENG	Medy Elito	Free agent	Released	
13 June 2016	MF	IRE	Mark Byrne	Free agent	Released	
13 June 2016	DF	ENG	Danny Holmes	Free agent	Released	
18 June 2016	MF	ENG	Alex Rodman	Free agent	Released	

=== Loans out ===
Date from	Position	Nationality	Name	To	Date until	Ref.
29 October 2015	GK	WAL	Rhys Taylor	Wrexham	End of season	
12 February 2016	DF	ENG	Nathan Ralph	Aldershot Town	End of season	

== Managerial statistics ==
Only competitive games from the 2015–16 season are included.

Name	Nat.	From	To	Record								Honours
Name	Nat.	From	To	PLD	W	D	L	GF	GA	GD	W%	Honours
Terry Butcher	(England)	30 April 2015	1 October 2015	12	1	2	9	8	21	−13	8.3	
John Sheridan	(England)	2 October 2015	13 January 2016	17	5	7	5	26	26	+0	29.4	
Warren Feeney	(Northern Ireland)	15 January 2016	–	23	6	5	12	17	27	−10	26.1	

== Competitions ==
=== Pre-season friendlies ===
On 20 May 2015, Newport County announced their first four friendlies against Undy, Port Talbot Town, Bath City and Eastleigh. A fifth against Weston-super-Mare was added on 21 May. On 11 July 2015, Newport County added a trip to Torquay United.

7 July 2015 Friendly	Undy Athletic	3–5	Newport County	Newport
19:10 BST (UTC+1)	Barnes 13'; Hopper 33'; 82'	Report	John-Lewis 12'; Klukowski 26', 73' (pen.); Collins 59'; Twumasi 67'	Stadium: Dragon Park

11 July 2015 Friendly	Port Talbot Town	1–3	Newport County	Port Talbot
14:30 BST (UTC+1)	Clark 59'	Report	Owen-Evans 61'; Jones 86'; Barrow 88'	Stadium: Victoria Road

14 July 2015 Friendly	Bath City	2–0	Newport County	Bath
19:45 BST (UTC+1)	Watkins 43'; McCootie 59'	Report		Stadium: Twerton Park; Attendance: 283 (43 travelling fans)

18 July 2015 Friendly	Torquay United	1–3	Newport County	Torquay
15:00 BST (UTC+1)	MacDonald 20'	Report	Barrow 2'; Boden 36', 49'	Stadium: Plainmoor; Attendance: 751

21 July 2015 Friendly	Eastleigh	2–1	Newport County	Eastleigh
19:45 BST (UTC+1)	Odubade; Evans	Report	Collins	Stadium: Ten Acres

26 July 2015 Friendly	Newport County	0–0	Queens Park Rangers	Newport
14:00 BST (UTC+1)				Stadium: Rodney Parade; Attendance: 1,840 (283 travelling fans)

28 July 2015 Friendly	Weston-super-Mare	2–2	Newport County	Weston-super-Mare
19:45 BST (UTC+1)	Jordan; Watkins	Report	Collins; Jones	Stadium: Woodspring Stadium

=== League Two ===
8 August 2015 1	Cambridge United	3–0	Newport County	Cambridge
15:00 BST (UTC+1)	Corr 24', 65'; Simpson 80'	Report		Stadium: Abbey Stadium; Attendance: 5,022; Referee: Darren Handley

15 August 2015 2	Newport County	2–2	Stevenage	Newport
15:00 BST (UTC+1)	Collins 58'; Boden 79'	Report	Akinyemi 39'; Hughes 90'	Stadium: Rodney Parade; Attendance: 2,521; Referee: Nick Kinseley

18 August 2015 3	Hartlepool United	1–0	Newport County	Hartlepool
19:45 BST (UTC+1)	Fenwick 52'	Report		Stadium: Victoria Park; Attendance: 3,739; Referee: Ben Toner

22 August 2015 4	Newport County	2–3	Leyton Orient	Newport
15:00 BST (UTC+1)	Boden 41'; Byrne 42'	Report	McCallum 4'; Simpson 7'; Cox 59'	Stadium: Rodney Parade; Attendance: 2,779; Referee: Brendan Malone

29 August 2015 5	Plymouth Argyle	1–0	Newport County	Plymouth
19:45 BST (UTC+1)	Carey 43'	Report		Stadium: Home Park; Attendance: 7,811; Referee: Andy Davies

5 September 2015 6	Newport County	0–3	York City	Newport
13:00 BST (UTC+1)		Report	Berrett 38'; Thompson 55'; Oliver 59'	Stadium: Rodney Parade; Attendance: 2,459; Referee: Trevor Kettle

12 September 2015 7	Newport County	1–2	Morecambe	Newport
15:00 BST (UTC+1)	Barrow 67'	Report	Goodall 34'; Mullin 90' (pen.)	Stadium: Rodney Parade; Attendance: 2,068; Referee: Robert Lewis

19 September 2015 8	Dagenham & Redbridge	0–0	Newport County	Dagenham
15:00 BST (UTC+1)		Report; Report; Report; Report; Report; Report; Report		Stadium: Victoria Road; Attendance: 1,654; Referee: Graham Salisbury

26 September 2015 9	Carlisle United	0–1	Newport County	Carlisle
15:00 BST (UTC+1)		Report; Report; Report; Report; Report	Blackwood 68'	Stadium: Brunton Park; Attendance: 4,402; Referee: Kevin Wright

29 September 2015 10	Newport County	0–3	Crawley Town	Newport
19:45 BST (UTC+1)		Report	Edwards 36', 42'; Harrold 61'	Stadium: Rodney Parade; Attendance: 2,137; Referee: Oliver Langford

3 October 2015 11	Newport County	1–1	Exeter City	Newport
15:00 BST (UTC+1)	John-Lewis 73'	Report	Grant 61'	Stadium: Rodney Parade; Attendance: 2,870; Referee: Dean Whitestone

10 October 2015 12	Mansfield Town	3–0	Newport County	Mansfield
15:00 BST (UTC+1)	Westcarr 50'; Benning 70'; Yussuf 90'	Report		Stadium: Field Mill; Attendance: 3,278; Referee: Steve Martin

17 October 2015 13	Newport County	0–1	Portsmouth	Newport
15:00 BST (UTC+1)		Report	Tubbs 45'	Stadium: Rodney Parade; Attendance: 3,298; Referee: James Adcock

20 October 2015 14	Wycombe Wanderers	0–2	Newport County	High Wycombe
19:45 BST (UTC+1)		Report	Bean 62' (o.g.); Boden 89'	Stadium: Adams Park; Attendance: 2,940; Referee: Fred Graham

24 October 2015 15	Bristol Rovers	1–4	Newport County	Bristol
15:00 BST (UTC+1)	Bodin 15'	Report	Parkes 13' (o.g.); Ansah 52', 57'; O'Sullivan 75'	Stadium: Memorial Stadium; Attendance: 7,442; Referee: Nick Kinseley

31 October 2015 16	Newport County	2–2	Northampton Town	Newport
15:00 UTC	Barrow 31'; John-Lewis 38'	Report	Hoskins 10'; Richards 30'	Stadium: Rodney Parade; Attendance: 2,424; Referee: Darren Deadman

14 November 2015 17	Accrington Stanley	2–2	Newport County	Accrington
15:00 (UTC)	Kee 58'; Crooks 77'	Report	Klukowski 54'; Boden 66'	Stadium: Crown Ground; Attendance: 1,552; Referee: Chris Sarginson

21 November 2015 18	Newport County	0–0	Yeovil Town	Newport
15:00 UTC		Report		Stadium: Rodney Parade; Attendance: 3,084; Referee: Mark Heywood

24 November 2015 19	Oxford United	1–1	Newport County	Oxford
19:45 (UTC)	Hoban 72'	Report	John-Lewis 43'	Stadium: Kassam Stadium; Attendance: 5,479; Referee: Andy Madley

28 November 2015 20	Newport County	3–0	Luton Town	Newport
15:00 UTC	McBurnie 63', 79', 86'	Report		Stadium: Rodney Parade; Attendance: 2,551; Referee: David Coote

12 December 2015 21	Notts County	4–3	Newport County	Nottingham
15:00 (UTC)	Noble 34', 90+6'; McLeod 41', 71'	Report	Byrne 5'; Rodman 10'; Boden 83'	Stadium: Meadow Lane; Attendance: 4,105; Referee: Darren Handley

19 December 2015 22	Newport County	2–2	AFC Wimbledon	Newport
15:00 UTC	Rodman 10'; Robinson 30' o.g.	Report	Taylor 46', 79'	Stadium: Rodney Parade; Attendance: 2,798; Referee: Kevin Johnson

26 December 2015 23	Barnet	2–0	Newport County	Edgware
15:00 UTC	Akinde 54' (pen.), 89'	Report		Stadium: The Hive Stadium; Referee: Tim Robinson

28 December 2015 24	Newport County	1–2	Plymouth Argyle	Newport
15:00 UTC	Boden 24'	Report	Jervis 48'; Brunt 70'	Stadium: Rodney Parade; Attendance: 4,314; Referee: Fred Graham

16 January 2016 25	York City	0–1	Newport County	York
15:00 UTC		Report	Collins 8'	Stadium: Bootham Crescent; Attendance: 2,923; Referee: Darren England

23 January 2016 26	Newport County	2–2	Dagenham & Redbridge	Newport
15:00 UTC	Ayina 83'; Wilkinson 88'	Report	Doidge 1'; Worrall 6'	Stadium: Rodney Parade; Attendance: 2,323; Referee: Darren Deadman

26 January 2016 27	Leyton Orient	1–0	Newport County	Leyton
19:45 UTC	Simpson 85' (pen.)	Report		Stadium: Brisbane Road; Attendance: 4,209; Referee: Andy Davies

30 January 2016 28	Morecambe	1–2	Newport County	Morecambe
15:00 UTC	Miller 60'	Report	Boden 1', 69'	Stadium: Globe Arena; Attendance: 1,342; Referee: Mark Brown

13 February 2016 29	Newport County	1–0	Carlisle United	Newport
13:00 UTC	Boden 56'	Report		Stadium: Rodney Parade; Attendance: 2,106; Referee: Lee Collins

20 February 2016 30	Exeter City	1–1	Newport County	Exeter
13:00 UTC	Tillson 51'	Report	Boden 84'	Stadium: St James Park; Attendance: 3,924; Referee: Mark Heywood

27 February 2016 31	Newport County	1–0	Mansfield Town	Newport
15:00 UTC	Boden 86'	Report		Stadium: Rodney Parade; Attendance: 2,361; Referee: Gavin Ward

1 March 2016 32	Crawley Town	2–0	Newport County	Crawley
19:45 UTC	Boden 36' (o.g.); Fenelon 53'	report		Stadium: Broadfield Stadium

5 March 2016 33	Newport County	1–0	Wycombe Wanderers	Newport
15:00 UTC	Boden 25'	Report		Stadium: Rodney Parade; Attendance: 2,325; Referee: Michael Bull

8 March 2016 34	Newport County	0–3	Barnet	Newport
19:45 UTC		Report	Yiadom 9'; Randall 47'; Jones 69' (o.g.)	Stadium: Rodney Parade; Attendance: 2,032; Referee: Lee Swabey

12 March 2016 35	Portsmouth	0–3	Newport County	Portsmouth
15:00 UTC		Report	Jones 34'; Boden 69'; Morgan 87'	Stadium: Fratton Park; Attendance: 16,245; Referee: Ben Toner

15 March 2016 36	Newport County	0–0	Hartlepool United	Newport
19:45 UTC		Report		Stadium: Rodney Parade; Attendance: 2,394; Referee: Brendan Malone

19 March 2016 37	Newport County	1–4	Bristol Rovers	Newport
12:30 UTC	Rodman 2'	Report	Clarke 15'; Montaño 55'; Taylor 61'; Harrison 85'	Stadium: Rodney Parade; Attendance: 3,663; Referee: Graham Salisbury

25 March 2016 38	Northampton Town	1–0	Newport County	Northampton
15:00 UTC	Marquis 22'	Report		Stadium: Sixfields Stadium; Attendance: 5,630; Referee: Chris Sarginson

28 March 2016 39	Newport County	0–2	Accrington Stanley	Newport
15:00 BST (UTC+1)		Report	Kee 35'; Windass 37'	Stadium: Rodney Parade; Attendance: 2,218; Referee: Seb Stockbridge

2 April 2016 40	Yeovil Town	1–0	Newport County	Yeovil
15:00 BST (UTC+1)	Compton 15' (pen.)	Report		Stadium: Huish Park; Attendance: 4,063; Referee: Keith Hill

9 April 2016 41	Newport County	0–1	Cambridge United	Newport
15:00 BST (UTC+1)		Report	Dunne 68'	Stadium: Rodney Parade; Attendance: 2,330; Referee: Darren England

16 April 2016 42	Stevenage	2–1	Newport County	Stevenage
15:00 BST (UTC+1)	Mulraney 9'; O'Connor 33'	Report	Rodman 87'	Stadium: Broadhall Way; Attendance: 2,673; Referee: Iain Williamson

19 April 2016 43	Newport County	1–1	Oxford United	Newport
19:45 BST (UTC+1)	Elito 14'	Report	Bowery 13'	Stadium: Rodney Parade; Attendance: 2,847; Referee: Gavin Ward

23 April 2016 44	Luton Town	1–1	Newport County	Luton
15:00 BST (UTC+1)	Marriott 81'	Report	Coulibaly 88'	Stadium: Kenilworth Road; Attendance: 7,606; Referee: Fred Graham

30 April 2016 45	Newport County	0–1	Notts County	Newport
15:00 BST (UTC+1)		Report	Snijders 38'	Stadium: Rodney Parade; Attendance: 4,903; Referee: Nick Kinseley

7 May 2016 46	A.F.C. Wimbledon	1–0	Newport County	Kingston upon Thames
15:00 BST (UTC+1)	Olusanya 80' (pen.)	Report		Stadium: Kingsmeadow; Attendance: 4,427; Referee: Geoff Eltringham

=== League Cup ===
11 August 2015 round 1	Wolverhampton Wanderers	2–1	Newport County	Wolverhampton
19:45 BST (UTC+1)	Dicko 15'; Afobe 58' (pen)	Report; Report; Report; Report	Boden 6'	Stadium: Molineux; Attendance: 9,586; Referee: Darren Bond

=== Football League Trophy ===
On 8 August 2015, live on Soccer AM the draw for the first round of the Football League Trophy was drawn by Toni Duggan and Alex Scott.

1 September 2015 First round	Newport County	1–1 (6–7 p)	Swindon Town	Newport
19:45 BST (UTC+1)	Collins 72'	Report	Rodgers 19'	Stadium: Rodney Parade; Attendance: 1,434; Referee: Kevin Johnson
	Penalties
	Byrne (penalty scored); Ansah (penalty scored); Klukowski (penalty scored); Boden (penalty scored); Ofori-Twumasi (penalty scored); Owen-Evans (penalty scored); Collins (penalty missed)		Rodgers (penalty scored); Robert (penalty scored); Turnbull (penalty scored); Brophy (penalty scored); Branco (penalty scored); Barry (penalty scored); Randall-Hurren (penalty scored)

=== FA Cup ===
8 November 2015 First round	Brackley Town	2–2	Newport County	Brackley
14:00 UTC	Graham 59'; McDonald 90+5'	Report	John-Lewis 15' (pen.); Bennett 41'	Stadium: St James Park; Attendance: 1,707; Referee: Mark Haywood

17 November 2015 First round replay	Newport County	4–1	Brackley Town	Newport
19:45 UTC	John-Lewis 1'; Klukowski 17'; Rodman 63'; Hawtin 71' (o.g.)	Report	Hawtin 39'	Stadium: Rodney Parade; Attendance: 1,511; Referee: Stuart Attwell

5 December 2015 Second round	Barnet	0–1	Newport County	Barnet
15:00 UTC		Report	Boden 59'	Stadium: The Hive Stadium; Attendance: 1,767; Referee: Dean Whitestone

18 January 2016 Third round	Newport County	1–2	Blackburn Rovers	Newport
15:00 UTC	Byrne 30'	report	Marshall 8' (pen.); Rhodes 75'	Stadium: Rodney Parade; Attendance: 5,083; Referee: Charles Breakspear
