= Joseph Green =

Joseph or Joe(y) Green may refer to:

== Writers ==
- Joseph Green (poet) (1706–1780), English Colonial wit, poet and clergyman
- Joseph Greene (writer) (1914–1990), American science fiction author under the pen name Joe Green
- Joseph L. Green (1931–2026), American science fiction author
- Joey Green (born 1958), American author
- Joseph Green (fl. 1959), writer and director of the film The Brain That Wouldn't Die

== Professionals ==
- Joseph Green (merchant) (1727–1786), English merchant
- Joseph Green (Rabbi), Rosh Yeshiva (Dean) at Etz Chaim Yeshiva (London)
- Joseph A. Green (general) (1881–1963), United States Army general
- Joseph A. Green (politician) (1814–1876), American politician in Iowa
- Joseph C. Green (1887–1978), American diplomat
- Joseph Frederick Green (1855–1932), British MP for Leicester West, 1918–1922
- Joseph Henry Green (1791–1863), English surgeon and literary executor of Samuel Taylor Coleridge
- Joseph I. Green (1868–1939), American lawyer, politician, and judge
- Joseph John Green (1824–1903), South Australian leather merchant
- Joseph Reynolds Green (1848–1914), English botanist, physiologist and chemist
- Joe Green (entrepreneur) (born 1983), American social media entrepreneur

== Sports ==
- Joseph Green (sprinter) (born 2001)
- Joseph Green (footballer) (1870–1940), English footballer
- Joseph Green (sportsman) (1846–1923), English cricketer and rugby union footballer
- Joe Green (American football) (born 1948), American football defensive back
- Joe Green (baseball, born 1878) (1878–1962), American baseball outfielder and manager
- Joe Green (baseball, born 1897) (1897–1972), American baseball pinch hitter
- Joe Green (footballer) (born 1995), English football goalkeeper

== Arts and entertainment ==
- Joseph Green (actor) (1900–1996), Yiddish theater actor and film director
- Joseph Green (producer) (1934–2017), Canadian theatre producer and university professor
- Joe Green, drummer with the group Milburn
- Joe Green, member of the Green Brothers Novelty Band

== Other ==
- Gauntlet (Joseph Green), Marvel Comics character
- Joseph Green (Doctor Who), a character in the Doctor Who episode "Aliens of London"
- "Joe Green", humorous English translation of the name of composer Giuseppe Verdi (1813–1901)

== See also ==
- Joseph Green Farmhouse, New York
- Joseph Green House, Florida
- Joseph Greene (disambiguation)
