= 2014–15 Yeovil Town F.C. season =

Yeovil Town
2014–15 season
- Chairman: John Fry
- Manager: Gary Johnson (until 4 February); Terry Skiverton (4 February – 9 April); Paul Sturrock (from 9 April)
- Stadium: Huish Park
- League One: 24th (relegated)
- FA Cup: Third round
- League Cup: First round
- FL Trophy: First round
- Top goalscorer: League: James Hayter, Gozie Ugwu (5); All: James Hayter, Gozie Ugwu (5)
- Highest home attendance: 9,264 (4 January vs. Manchester United, FA Cup)
- Lowest home attendance: 2,283 (12 August vs. Gillingham, League Cup)
- Average home league attendance: 4,346
Home colours	Away colours

The 2014–15 season was the 12th season in the Football League played by Yeovil Town Football Club, an English football club based in Yeovil, Somerset. Their relegation from the Championship in the 2013–14 season meant an immediate return to League One.

Manager Gary Johnson signed ten players before the close of the summer transfer window. The season started poorly with two consecutive league defeats and despite a brief improvement in form in late August and September, Yeovil remained in the relegation zone from October until the end of the season. The club's poor form led to the departure of Johnson in February, but his replacement Terry Skiverton could not arrest the Glovers plight and after six consecutive league defeats was replaced by Paul Sturrock. His first match in charge saw Yeovil's back-to-back relegation to League Two confirmed.

The club reached the third round of the FA Cup, losing to Premier League side Manchester United having beaten Crawley Town and Accrington Stanley in the preceding rounds. Yeovil were eliminated in the first round of both the League Cup and the Football League Trophy, losing to Gillingham and Portsmouth respectively. James Hayter and January signing Gozie Ugwu were the club's top scorers with 5 goals each, with all of those coming in the league.

== Background ==
The 2013–14 season saw Yeovil compete in the second tier of English football for the first time in their history following promotion to the Championship via the 2013 Football League One play-off final. Despite starting the season with victory at Millwall on the opening day, the club only won eight league matches all season being relegated with a match to spare. The club finished bottom of the league seven points from safety having suffered the first relegation in 19 years. Despite relegation in the league Yeovil reached the fourth round of the FA Cup for only the third time in the club's history losing 2–0 to Premier League side Southampton.

The end of the season featured a large turnover of players with four being released, including club captain Jamie McAllister, defender Joey Jones, midfielder Rubén Palazuelos and forward Reuben Reid. Six players were offered new contracts goalkeepers Chris Dunn and Marek Štěch and defender Byron Webster rejected the offer of new contracts, while James Hayter and Seth Nana Twumasi signed new contracts with the club. Defenders Calvin Brooks and Nathan Ralph were invited back for pre-season training while Luke Ayling rejected a new contract.

== Review ==
=== Pre-season ===
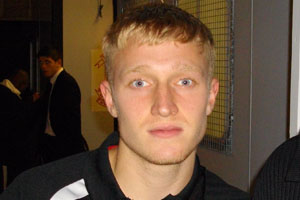
Striker A-Jay Leitch-Smith signed from Crewe Alexandra.

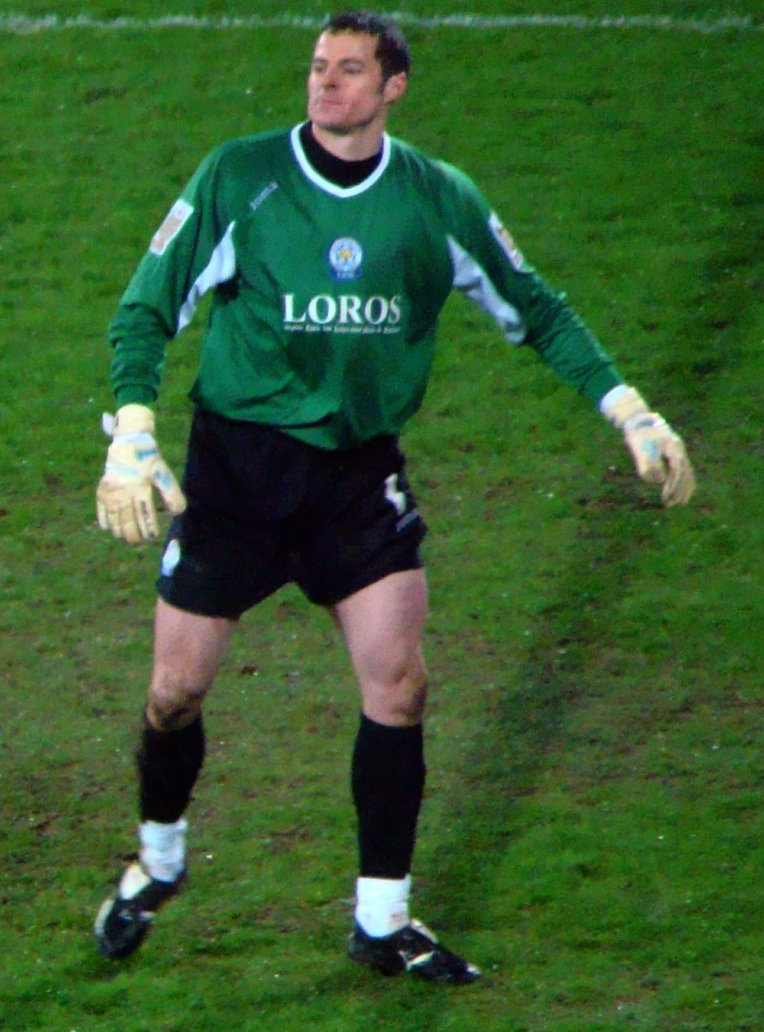
Chris Weale returned to the club for a third spell.

The squad returned for pre-season training on 1 July. The first day of pre-season saw the squad joined by six new signings, former Yeovil youth team goalkeeper Chris Weale returned to the club from Shrewsbury Town, Polish goalkeeper Artur Krysiak joined Yeovil from Exeter City, former Liverpool defender Jakub Sokolík, ex-Southampton centre-back Aaron Martin, former Crewe Alexandra striker A-Jay Leitch-Smith, and Jamaican international defender Nathan Smith returned to the club three years after leaving for Chesterfield all signing two-year contracts. The players were joined on 3 July by Carlisle United midfielder James Berrett signing a two-year contract having rejected a new deal from the Cumbrians. On 8 July, Yeovil full-back Luke Ayling joined fellow League One side Bristol City after the two clubs agreed an undisclosed compensation fee. The same day saw the club sign Bristol City right-back Brendan Moloney following the cancellation of his contract signing a two-year contract with the Glovers. The club announced that local Italian restaurant chain Tamburino would become the new Main Stand sponsor at Huish Park.

On 9 July, the club confirmed that defender Seth Nana Twumasi had signed a new one-year contract prior to the team's first friendly of pre-season against Frome Town. Yeovil ran out 6–1 winners thanks to two goals from both Leitch-Smith and Kieffer Moore and a goal each from Sam Hoskins and Sam Foley. Yeovil confirmed the signing, on 11 July, of Cardiff City defender Ben Nugent on loan until 4 January. Yeovil's second pre-season, on 12 July, friendly saw them travel to Basingstoke Town but despite a Sam Hoskins goal they were held to a 1–1 draw against their Conference South opponents. Yeovil's third pre-season friendly saw them face Conference National side Torquay United, despite goals from Leitch-Smith and French trialist Kamel Chergui the club were held to a 2–2 draw. On 19 July, Yeovil faced Championship side Reading in their first home friendly. A Pavel Pogrebnyak goal gave Reading an early second half lead before Yeovil equalised through "Trialist B", later revealed to be Achille Campion, as the Glovers earned a 1–1 draw. Yeovil's second home pre-season friendly, on 22 July, saw them beat non-league side Bristol Rovers 2–0 thanks to a brace from Leitch-Smith.

On 27 July, Yeovil suffered their first pre-season defeat losing 4–1 at home to Championship side Cardiff City despite leading 1–0 at half-time thanks to another Leitch-Smith goal. The club bounced back from their defeat with a 2–1 victory away at League Two side Plymouth Argyle with goals from Liam Davis and Sam Hoskins. Prior to their friendly victory the club announced their squad numbers for the new season and included former non-contract defender Calvin Brooks indicating that he had been offered a contract for the new season. The 1 August, saw Yeovil announce local taxi firm Radio Cabs as the new sponsor for the Away Stand at Huish Park. Following a brief training camp in Cornwall, Yeovil's penultimate friendly saw them face Truro City as part of the Cornish club's 125th Anniversary celebrations. Goals from trialist Simon Gillett and former Truro forward Kieffer Moore earned Yeovil a 2–1 victory. Yeovil completed their pre-season with a visit to Dorchester Town on 4 August. Hat-tricks from James Hayter and Sam Hoskins along with goals from Seth Nana Twumasi, Matteo Lanzoni and Sam Foley saw Yeovil run out 9–0 victors. On 7 August, the club confirmed the signing of former Nottingham Forest midfielder Simon Gillett on a two-year contract, and the following day confirmed that defender Nathan Ralph had signed a six-month contract extension. Forward Adam Morgan, on 8 August, signed for Scottish Premiership side St Johnstone on a five-month loan deal until mid-January 2015. On the same day manager Gary Johnson announced versatile midfielder Joe Edwards as his captain for the forthcoming season.

Pre-season match details
Date	Opponents	Venue	Result	Score F–A	Scorers	Attendance	Ref
9 July 2014	Frome Town	A	W	6–1	Leitch-Smith (2), Hoskins, Moore (2), Foley	475	
12 July 2014	Basingstoke Town	A	D	1–1	Hoskins	315	
15 July 2014	Torquay United	A	D	2–2	Leitch-Smith, Chergui		
19 July 2014	Reading	H	D	1–1	Campion	1,153	
22 July 2014	Bristol Rovers	H	W	2–1	Leitch-Smith (2)	1,498	
27 July 2014	Cardiff City	H	L	1–4	Leitch-Smith	2,018	
30 July 2014	Plymouth Argyle	A	W	2–1	Davis, Hoskins	1,735	
2 August 2014	Truro City	A	W	2–1	Gillett, Moore	342	
4 August 2014	Dorchester Town	A	W	9–0	Twumasi, Lanzoni, Hayter (3), Hoskins (3), Foley	789	

=== August ===
Yeovil's League One season started with a home fixture against fellow relegated side Doncaster Rovers, on 9 August, Yeovil lost the game 3–0. On 12 August, Yeovil faced Gillingham in the first round of the Football League Cup losing 2–1 at home with only a Simon Gillett goal to show for their efforts and a red card for Seth Nana Twumasi compounding a miserable evening. Yeovil then travelled to Gillingham in the League on 16 August, an early Kieffer Moore penalty miss saw the club suffer a 2–0 defeat their second in five days. On 19 August, Yeovil earned their first victory of the season away at Walsall, courtesy of goals from James Hayter and Kevin Dawson leading Yeovil to a 2–1 win. On 23 August, Yeovil faced Scunthorpe United at home despite Kieffer Moore giving Yeovil the lead, a late equaliser from former Glover Paddy Madden held Yeovil to a 1–1 draw. Italian defender Matteo Lanzoni left the club, on 28 August, after his contract was terminated by mutual consent after six months with the club, later that day joining League Two side Cambridge United. Yeovil ended the month with another 1–1 home draw this time against Barnsley on 30 August.

=== September ===
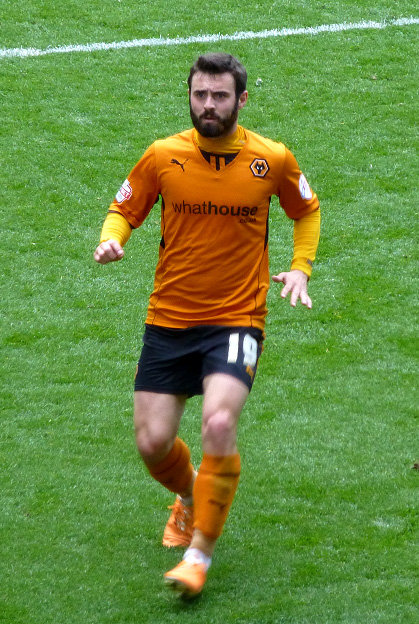
Midfielder Jack Price joined the club on a one-month loan from Wolves.

Transfer deadline day saw Yeovil bring in Wolverhampton Wanderers midfielder Jack Price on a one-month emergency loan deal as cover for the injured Simon Gillett. On 2 September, Yeovil faced League Two side Portsmouth in the first round of the Football League Trophy at Huish Park. Despite a good first half, Yeovil lost the match 3–1 with left-sided player Nathan Ralph scoring the club's consolation goal. On 6 September, Yeovil travelled to Bradford City and secured a 3–1 victory courtesy of a first-half brace from defender Aaron Martin, and a first goal for the club from A-Jay Leitch-Smith. Yeovil's four game unbeaten run in the league came to an end away at Coventry City, on 13 September, in a 2–1 defeat with Sam Foley grabbing the Yeovil goal. Following the match, Yeovil signed Blackburn Rovers goalkeeper Jake Kean on a one-month loan deal. Kean made his Yeovil debut against bottom club Crewe Alexandra, on 16 September, the visitors opened the scoring through Billy Waters but they only led for ten minutes with substitute Kieffer Moore earning Yeovil a draw. On 19 September, forward Sam Hoskins joined Conference Premier side Barnet on a short-term loan deal. The following day, Yeovil faced Peterborough United at home and earned their first home victory of the season and first clean sheet courtesy of a late goal from Jamaican international Joel Grant. Young defender Calvin Brooks joined Southern League Premier side Weymouth on an initial one-month loan deal on 26 September. On 27 September, Yeovil travelled to Crawley Town but lost 2–0 due to a brace from Marvin Elliott.

=== October ===
On 2 October, Manchester City striker Jordy Hiwula joined Yeovil on loan until 5 January. The 4 October, saw Yeovil face Milton Keynes Dons at Huish Park, MK Dons won the match 2–0 thanks to two second-half goals against a ten-man Yeovil side following Ben Nugent's dismissal for a second bookable offence. On 11 October, Yeovil travelled to Port Vale and lost the match 4–1 with an Aaron Martin goal the only thing to show for Yeovil's efforts as the club slipped back into the relegation zone of League One. Following the match, Yeovil signed Crystal Palace defender Ryan Inniss on a youth loan for an initial month. Inniss made his debut in an improved performance, on 18 October against Swindon Town. Despite James Hayter giving Yeovil a first-half lead a goal from former Glover Andy Williams earned Swindon a 1–1 draw. The following week saw Yeovil lose 2–0 away at Sheffield United, followed by a 3–0 home defeat to Rochdale which saw the club drop to 23rd in League One. On 27 October, Yeovil were drawn at home to Crawley Town in the first round of the FA Cup.

After a month which brought just 1 point from 5 league matches, the end of the month saw a high turnover of players, with goalkeeper Jed Steer signing on loan from Aston Villa and defender Stephen Arthurworrey signing on loan from Fulham both until 31 January, while right back Jordan Clarke joined from Coventry City until 5 January with Yeovil topscorer Aaron Martin moving in the other direction. While defender Jakub Sokolík joined Southend United on a 28-day loan deal.

=== November ===
On 1 November, Yeovil ended their three match losing run with a goalless draw away at Chesterfield, keeping only their second clean sheet of the season. Attacking midfielder Joel Grant was once again called up to the Jamaica national football team for the 2014 Caribbean Cup between 11–18 November. The FA Cup first round saw Yeovil face Crawley Town, on 8 November, and won the game thanks to a first professional goal for Jordy Hiwula. The second round draw saw Yeovil drawn away at the winner of Notts County or Accrington Stanley. The 11 November, saw Yeovil face Western League side Hengrove Athletic in the second round of the Somerset Premier Cup. Yeovil secured a club competition record victory a 13–0 win, despite being only 2–0 up at half-time, thanks to hat-tricks from James Hayter and Jordy Hiwula as well as goals Berrett, Foley, Leitch-Smith, Gillett, Davis and a brace from Seth Nana Twumasi. On 15 November, goalkeeper Chris Weale joined League Two side Burton Albion on a month's loan deal. Later that day Yeovil slipped to the bottom of the league table after 1–0 defeat against Fleetwood Town following a solitary Jeff Hughes goal. On 17 November, Yeovil announced that defender Ryan Inniss had extended his loan from Crystal Palace until 20 December. Yeovil's first victory for two months came away at play-off chasing Notts County, on 22 November, following a controversial red card for Notts midfielder Gary Jones after half an hour, Yeovil eventually won the match 2–1 with two late headers from full back Jordan Clarke. The match was to be Jordy Hiwula last game for the club having been sent back to Manchester City, on 27 November, Yeovil signed Bolton Wanderers forward Tom Eaves on loan until 5 January. On 28 November, Yeovil signed former Fulham and Swindon Town left-sided player Alex Smith on a month-long deal. Yeovil ended the month with a 2–0 defeat against Preston North End, including a goal from former Yeovil captain Paul Huntington, Yeovil ended the game with ten men following a red card for defender Ryan Inniss.

=== December ===
On 2 December, Southend United announced they had extended the loan of Yeovil defender Jakub Sokolík until 3 January. Yeovil travelled to Accrington Stanley, for the first competitive meeting between the two clubs, in the FA Cup second round. After taking the lead through another Jordan Clarke header, a desperately poor second half from Yeovil saw them hanging on for a 1–1 draw and a replay. The 13 December saw the second meeting between Gary Johnson and his son Lee, as Yeovil travelled to Oldham Athletic. Yeovil ran out convincing 4–0 winners with goals from Stephen Arthurworrey, Simon Gillett, Sam Hoskins and Kieffer Moore. After picking up a serious knee injury whilst on loan at Southend United Sokolík had his loan spell cut short at returned to Yeovil. On 16 December, Yeovil faced Accrington at home in their FA Cup second round replay, and won the match 2–0 courtesy of two late goals from Simon Gillett and Kieffer Moore, to set up a third-round tie at home against Manchester United. On 20 December, Yeovil's first match of the festive period saw them face Colchester United in a relegation six-pointer, the game was decided late on with Craig Eastmond winning it for Colchester and leapfrogging Yeovil in the table in the process. Boxing Day saw Yeovil travel to Ashton Gate to face league leaders Bristol City, despite Jed Steer saving a first-half penalty from former Glover Kieran Agard in the first half Yeovil went in behind at half time following a Matt Smith header. Yeovil fell further behind after conceding a second penalty converted by Jay Emmanuel-Thomas and despite a first goal for the club from Ben Nugent, with a 35-yard shot, Yeovil lost the game 2–1 and slipped to the bottom of the league. Yeovil ended 2014 with another six-pointer at home against Leyton Orient losing the game 3–0 and ending the year five points from safety.

=== January ===
The opening of the January transfer window, saw right-back Brendan Moloney be sent out on loan to League Two side Northampton Town until the end of the season. On 4 January, Yeovil faced Premier League side Manchester United in the FA Cup third round at Huish Park. A 9,264 sell-out saw Yeovil hold their illustrious opponents for over an hour before eventually succumbing to a 2–0 defeat. Following the match, Yeovil extended the loan of Ben Nugent from Cardiff City until the end of the season, while Jordan Clarke, Tom Eaves and Ryan Inniss returned to their respective parent clubs. On 8 January, left-sided player Nathan Ralph extended his contract until the end of the season, the following day saw the departure of centre-back Aaron Martin to Coventry City after being released from his Yeovil contract. On 12 January, Yeovil traveled to Barnsley and following a sending off for Ben Nugent, for raising his elbow, ten-man Yeovil lost the match 2–0. Following the game the club confirmed that midfielders Kevin Dawson and Simon Gillett both face long-term absences after suffering injuries during the Manchester United FA Cup game. On 14 January, Yeovil made their first signing of the transfer window bringing in Jamaican international striker Jamar Loza on loan from Norwich City on a one-month youth loan deal. The following day Yeovil confirmed the signing of striker and Dunfermline Athletic top goalscorer Gozie Ugwu on a short-term contract after his release from the Scottish League One side, while young defender Calvin Brooks left the club to join Southern League side Weymouth after the expiry of his contract. On 17 January, prior to their match against Bradford City, Yeovil confirmed the signing of Swansea City right back Liam Shephard on a youth loan deal. Despite needing to play Kieffer Moore as an emergency centre-back Yeovil recorded their second home league win of the season, with Ugwu on his second debut for the club grabbing the winning goal in a 1–0 victory. On 20 January, Yeovil traveled to Preston North End with Ugwu scoring his second goal in as many games to give Yeovil the lead before Preston equalised late on through Sylvan Ebanks-Blake with the game ending 1–1. Yeovil then faced Coventry City at home, with a Jed Steer penalty save helping the club extend their unbeaten run to three games and move off the foot of the league table with a goalless draw. On 29 January, the club announced the extension of Fulham defender Stephen Arthurworrey's loan until the end of the season and the signing of former Mansfield Town midfielder Fergus Bell until the end of the season. While the chances of extending the loan of Aston Villa goalkeeper Jed Steer was ended after Villa refused to extend his loan. On 31 January, Yeovil visited Peterborough United losing the game 1–0 on a poor pitch slipping back to the bottom of the league.

=== February ===
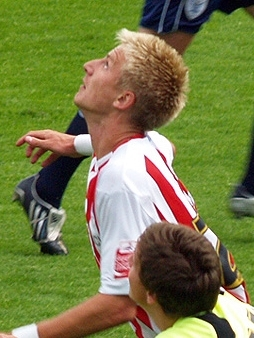
Defender Byron Webster re-joined the club on loan from Millwall.

Transfer deadline day was quiet for Yeovil with only the permanent departure of Brendan Moloney to League Two side Northampton Town after he was released from his Yeovil contract. On 4 February, Gary Johnson was relieved of his duties as first-team manager, after seven years with the club over two spells, and replaced by his assistant and predecessor Terry Skiverton as acting manager. Skiverton's first match in charge was a six-pointer at home against Crawley Town, on 7 February, two second half goals from Gozie Ugwu and A-Jay Leitch-Smith saw Yeovil win 2–1 and move off the bottom of the table. The following week saw Yeovil suffer back to back away defeats, a 1–0 reverse against Crewe Alexandra, was followed by a 3–0 defeat against Doncaster Rovers which saw the club return to the bottom of the league. In response to back-to-back defeats Skiverton made four signings midfielder Craig Eastmond joined on a short-term contract until the end of the season, Swansea City players Stephen Kingsley and Josh Sheehan signed on a one-month emergency loans while defender Byron Webster returned to the club on loan from Millwall until the end of the season. In addition to this defender Liam Shephard extended his youth loan from Swansea City until the end of the season. On 21 February, Yeovil stayed bottom of the league after a 2–2 draw against Gillingham, Gozie Ugwu has given Yeovil an early lead before Gillingham fought back to lead 2–1 before Adam Morgan, on his first appearance for almost a year, scored an injury-time penalty to earn Yeovil a point. Yeovil ended the month with a trip to Scunthorpe United, Jamaican winger Joel Grant gave Yeovil the lead on his return from injury before goalkeeper Artur Krysiak suffered a head injury and being replaced by goalkeeping-coach Gareth Stewart. Who right on half time managed to save a Paddy Madden penalty to preserve the advantage, before Hakeeb Adelakun's second-half equaliser earned Scunthorpe a draw.

=== March ===
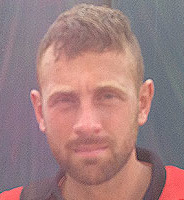
Goalkeeper Scott Loach saved a penalty on his debut after joining on loan from Rotherham United.

After Artur Krysiak suffered a head injury, requiring 10 stitches, Yeovil signed goalkeeper Scott Loach on loan from Rotherham United on a one-month emergency loan deal. On 3 March, Yeovil faced Walsall and Loach on his debut saved a first-half penalty before former loan striker Jordi Hiwula gave Walsall the lead which they held until the final whistle after Adam Morgan had his penalty saved by Walsall keeper Richard O'Donnell. On 7 March, Yeovil secured three points against Oldham Athletic after Joel Grant scored a second half equaliser before James Hayter hit an injury-time winner, to move within three points of safety. The club then subsequently lost their final four matches in March, 3–0 defeats at home to Bristol City, and away at relegation rivals Leyton Orient, were followed by a 2–0 defeat at second bottom Colchester United, and a 2–1 away defeat at Rochdale which left Yeovil ten points adrift of safety. In between the Colchester and Rochdale defeats, Yeovil progressed through to the semi-finals of the Somerset Premier Cup with a penalty shootout victory over Larkhall Athletic on 24 March.

=== April and May ===
On 3 April, Yeovil faced play-off chasing Chesterfield and despite taking a 2–0 lead through James Hayter and Sam Foley, a mid-second half collapse saw Yeovil concede three goals in just ten minutes to lose the match 3–2. Easter Monday, saw Yeovil lose 4–0 away at Fleetwood Town, to leave the club thirteen points adrift of safety.

Following this sixth consecutive league defeat the club announced, on 9 April, the appointment of Paul Sturrock as the club's new first team manager with acting manager Terry Skiverton and acting assistant manager Darren Way reverting to their former jobs. Sturrock's first game in charge saw Yeovil face Notts County but despite taking the lead through a Haydn Hollis own goal a late Garry Thompson equaliser saw Yeovil suffer back-to-back relegations. With relegation already confirmed Yeovil faced play-off chasers Sheffield United, on 14 April, and recorded a 1–0 win thanks to a Stephen Arthurworrey goal. Yeovil then traveled to face promotion-chasing Swindon Town on 18 April, before the match manager Paul Sturrock confirmed the departure of player/goalkeeper coach Gareth Stewart with immediate effect due to financial cutbacks. A first goal for the club from midfielder James Berrett helped Yeovil to another 1–0 victory, their first successive victories since December 2013. On 21 April, Yeovil faced Bridgwater Town in the semi-final of the Somerset Premier Cup goals from James Hayter and a double from Fergus Bell helped Yeovil to a 3–1 win and a place in the final. Yeovil's final home game of the season saw the first defeat of Sturrock's reign with Port Vale winning the match 2–1 with Gozie Ugwu scoring Yeovil's only goal. After the game Yeovil's annual end of season awards, saw midfielder Sam Foley completing a near clean sweep winning five of the seven awards. Yeovil's league season ended with a 5–1 defeat away at Milton Keynes Dons, in a game which saw their opponents promoted as runners-up. On 7 May, Yeovil faced Southern League side Taunton Town in the final of the Somerset Premier Cup, with Yeovil naming no substitutes on the bench for the fixture. The club lost the match 1–0 after extra time.

== Summary and aftermath ==
Yeovil occupied a relegation position for the majority of the season and from October until the end of the season. In the league the team won 5 matches, drew 7 and lost 11 at home, compared to winning 5, drawing 3 and losing 15 away from home. The club's 26 league defeats was the most suffered by Yeovil in their history and their total of 36 league goals their fewest since the Second World War. Nathan Smith recorded the highest number of appearances during the season, appearing in 46 of Yeovil's 53 matches. James Hayter and January signing Gozie Ugwu were the club's top scorers with 5 goals each, with all of those coming in the league.

The end of the season saw new manager Paul Sturrock perform a major clear out of the Yeovil squad, with eleven players released including Fergus Bell, Liam Davis, Craig Eastmond, Joel Grant, James Hayter, Sam Hoskins, Kieffer Moore, Nathan Ralph, Alex Smith, Seth Nana Twumasi and Gozie Ugwu. Club captain Joe Edwards rejected an offer of a new contract and left the club, while midfielder Kevin Dawson and Sam Foley were also offered new contracts and goalkeeper Chris Weale was offered a fresh contract. In addition the club made offers to terminate the contracts of A-Jay Leitch-Smith, James Berrett, Adam Morgan and Artur Krysiak. Morgan was the first of the four to agree to terminate his contract to join Accrington Stanley on a one-year deal, midfielder Berrett left for York City, while Krysiak decided to remain at the club. On 26 May, the Sturrock agreed a new two-year contract with the club having been working with the club informally since April. On 18 June, midfielder Sam Foley rejected the club's offer of a new contract to sign a two-year deal with Port Vale, while the following day Kevin Dawson signed a new two-year contract with the club.

== Club ==
The club's management team and backroom staff remained the same as the 2013–14 season. After a poor start to the season manager Gary Johnson, on 4 February, was sacked and replaced by his assistant Terry Skiverton as acting first team manager with Darren Way being promoted to acting assistant manager. On 9 April, Skiverton having failed to lift Yeovil off the foot of the table was replaced by former Plymouth Argyle manager Paul Sturrock. After the club's relegation to League Two was confirmed the club announced the departure of goalkeeping coach Gareth Stewart due to financial cutbacks.

A new home and away kit were introduced late in pre-season due to quality issues from manufacturer Sondico, which also delayed its sale until late August. The new home kit again featured green and white hoops, but in the new kit the green stripe is itself made up of six green stripes. While the away kit saw a change from the previous fluorescent designs, instead the away kit featured a gold jersey with green trim. Both kits continued to feature W+S Recycling as the club's main sponsor but with the addition of Thatchers Cider as the new rear shirt sponsor.

=== Coaching staff ===
Until 4 February 2015

Position	Staff
Manager	Gary Johnson
Assistant manager	Terry Skiverton
First team coach	Darren Way
Goalkeeping coach	Gareth Stewart
Head physio	Simon Baker
Assistant physio	Mike Micciche
Football analyst	Stuart Housley

From 4 February to 9 April 2015

Position	Staff
Acting manager	Terry Skiverton
Acting assistant manager	Darren Way
Goalkeeping coach	Gareth Stewart
Head physio	Simon Baker
Assistant physio	Mike Micciche
Football analyst	Stuart Housley

After 9 April 2015

Position	Staff
Manager	Paul Sturrock
Assistant manager	Terry Skiverton
First team coach	Darren Way
Head physio	Simon Baker
Assistant physio	Mike Micciche
Football analyst	Stuart Housley

=== Kit ===
Supplier: Sondico
Sponsor(s): W+S Recycling

Home	Away

== Transfers ==
=== In ===
Date	Name	From	Fee	Ref
1 July 2014	Artur Krysiak	Exeter City	Free (released)	
1 July 2014	A-Jay Leitch-Smith	Crewe Alexandra	Free (released)	
1 July 2014	Aaron Martin	Birmingham City	Free (released)	
1 July 2014	Jakub Sokolík	Liverpool	Free (released)	
1 July 2014	Nathan Smith	Chesterfield	Free	
1 July 2014	Chris Weale	Shrewsbury Town	Free (released)	
3 July 2014	James Berrett	Carlisle United	Free	
8 July 2014	Brendan Moloney	Bristol City	Free (released)	
7 August 2014	Simon Gillett	Nottingham Forest	Free (released)	
29 November 2014	Alex Smith	Swindon Town	Free (released)	
15 January 2015	Gozie Ugwu	Dunfermline Athletic	Free (released)	
29 January 2015	Fergus Bell	Mansfield Town	Free (released)	
17 February 2015	Craig Eastmond	Colchester United	Free (released)	

=== Out ===
Date	Name	To	Fee	Ref
8 July 2014	Luke Ayling	Bristol City	Rejected new contract Undisclosed compensation	
28 August 2014	Matteo Lanzoni	Cambridge United	Contract terminated by mutual consent	
9 January 2015	Aaron Martin	Coventry City	Contract terminated by mutual consent	
16 January 2015	Calvin Brooks	Weymouth	Released	
2 February 2015	Brendan Moloney	Northampton Town	Contract terminated by mutual consent	
17 April 2015	Gareth Stewart	Bournemouth	Contract terminated by mutual consent	
4 June 2015	Adam Morgan	Accrington Stanley	Contract terminated by mutual consent	
23 June 2015	James Berrett	York City	Contract terminated by mutual consent	
30 June 2015	Joe Edwards	Colchester United	Rejected new contract	
30 June 2015	Sam Foley	Port Vale	Rejected new contract	
30 June 2015	Fergus Bell	Torquay United	Released	
30 June 2015	Liam Davis	GAIS	Released	
30 June 2015	Craig Eastmond	Sutton United	Released	
30 June 2015	Joel Grant	Exeter City	Released	
30 June 2015	James Hayter	Havant & Waterlooville	Released	
30 June 2015	Sam Hoskins	Northampton Town	Released	
30 June 2015	Kieffer Moore	Viking	Released	
30 June 2015	Nathan Ralph	Newport County	Released	
30 June 2015	Alex Smith	Woking	Released	
30 June 2015	Seth Nana Twumasi	Newport County	Released	
30 June 2015	Gozie Ugwu	Wycombe Wanderers	Released	

=== Loan in ===
Date	Name	From	End date	Ref
11 July 2014	Ben Nugent	Cardiff City	4 May 2015	
1 September 2014	Jack Price	Wolverhampton Wanderers	4 October 2014	
15 September 2014	Jake Kean	Blackburn Rovers	13 October 2014	
2 October 2014	Jordy Hiwula	Manchester City	25 November 2014	
16 October 2014	Ryan Inniss	Crystal Palace	6 January 2015	
29 October 2014	Jordan Clarke	Coventry City	5 January 2015	
31 October 2014	Stephen Arthurworrey	Fulham	4 May 2015	
31 October 2014	Jed Steer	Aston Villa	31 January 2015	
27 November 2014	Tom Eaves	Bolton Wanderers	5 January 2015	
14 January 2015	Jamar Loza	Norwich City	14 February 2015	
17 January 2015	Liam Shephard	Swansea City	4 May 2015	
17 February 2015	Josh Sheehan	Swansea City	4 May 2015	
18 February 2015	Stephen Kingsley	Swansea City	4 May 2015	
19 February 2015	Byron Webster	Millwall	4 May 2015	
2 March 2015	Scott Loach	Rotherham United	2 April 2015	

=== Loan out ===
Date	Name	To	End date	Ref
8 August 2014	Adam Morgan	St Johnstone	1 January 2015	
19 September 2014	Sam Hoskins	Barnet	27 October 2014	
26 September 2014	Calvin Brooks	Weymouth	26 December 2014	
29 October 2014	Aaron Martin	Coventry City	5 January 2015	
31 October 2014	Jakub Sokolík	Southend United	16 December 2014	
15 November 2014	Chris Weale	Burton Albion	15 December 2014	
2 January 2015	Brendan Moloney	Northampton Town	2 February 2015	

== Match results ==
League positions are sourced from Statto, while the remaining contents of each table are sourced from the references in the "Ref" column.

=== League One ===
League One match details
Date	League position	Opponents	Venue	Result	Score F–A	Scorers	Attendance	Ref
9 August 2014	24th	Doncaster Rovers	H	L	0–3		5,235	
16 August 2014	23rd	Gillingham	A	L	0–2		5,173	
19 August 2014	19th	Walsall	A	W	2–1	Hayter, Dawson	3,758	
23 August 2014	19th	Scunthorpe United	H	D	1–1	Moore	3,943	
30 August 2014	19th	Barnsley	H	D	1–1	Cranie (og)	3,991	
6 September 2014	12th	Bradford City	A	W	3–1	Martin (2), Leitch-Smith	12,601	
13 September 2014	16th	Coventry City	A	L	1–2	Foley	11,085	
16 September 2014	16th	Crewe Alexandra	H	D	1–1	Moore	3,509	
20 September 2014	13th	Peterborough United	H	W	1–0	Grant	3,970	
27 September 2014	15th	Crawley Town	A	L	0–2		2,351	
4 October 2014	19th	Milton Keynes Dons	H	L	0–2		4,000	
11 October 2014	21st	Port Vale	A	L	1–4	Martin	4,798	
18 October 2014	19th	Swindon Town	H	D	1–1	Hayter	5,679	
21 October 2014	21st	Sheffield United	A	L	0–2		19,353	
25 October 2014	22nd	Rochdale	H	L	0–3		3,601	
1 November 2014	23rd	Chesterfield	A	D	0–0		6,462	
15 November 2014	24th	Fleetwood Town	H	L	0–1		3,577	
22 November 2014	22nd	Notts County	A	W	2–1	Clarke (2)	7,746	
29 November 2014	23rd	Preston North End	H	L	0–2		4,343	
13 December 2014	21st	Oldham Athletic	A	W	4–0	Arthurworrey, Gillett, Hoskins, Moore	3,706	
20 December 2014	22nd	Colchester United	H	L	0–1		6,837	
26 December 2014	24th	Bristol City	A	L	1–2	Nugent	13,731	
29 December 2014	24th	Leyton Orient	H	L	0–3		4,132	
10 January 2015	24th	Barnsley	A	L	0–2		8,518	
17 January 2015	24th	Bradford City	H	W	1–0	Ugwu	4,009	
20 January 2015	24th	Preston North End	A	D	1–1	Ugwu	7,491	
24 January 2015	23rd	Coventry City	H	D	0–0		4,422	
31 January 2015	24th	Peterborough United	A	L	0–1		5,146	
7 February 2015	22nd	Crawley Town	H	W	2–1	Ugwu, Leitch-Smith	3,807	
10 February 2015	22nd	Crewe Alexandra	A	L	0–1		3,523	
14 February 2015	24th	Doncaster Rovers	A	L	0–3		5,950	
21 February 2015	24th	Gillingham	H	D	2–2	Ugwu, Morgan (pen)	4,293	
28 February 2015	24th	Scunthorpe United	A	D	1–1	Grant	3,783	
3 March 2015	24th	Walsall	H	L	0–1		3,668	
7 March 2015	24th	Oldham Athletic	H	W	2–1	Grant, Hayter	3,917	
10 March 2015	24th	Bristol City	H	L	0–3		6,591	
14 March 2015	24th	Leyton Orient	A	L	0–3		5,117	
17 March 2015	24th	Colchester United	A	L	0–2		2,336	
28 March 2015	24th	Rochdale	A	L	1–2	Hayter	2,650	
3 April 2015	24th	Chesterfield	H	L	2–3	Hayter, Foley	4,520	
6 April 2015	24th	Fleetwood Town	A	L	0–4		3,086	
11 April 2015	24th	Notts County	H	D	1–1	Hollis (og)	3,947	
14 April 2015	24th	Sheffield United	H	W	1–0	Arthurworrey	3,841	
18 April 2015	24th	Swindon Town	A	W	1–0	Berrett	8,490	
25 April 2015	24th	Port Vale	H	L	1–2	Ugwu	4,127	
3 May 2015	24th	Milton Keynes Dons	A	L	1–5	Spence (og)	16,965	

==== League table ====
Pos	Team	Pld	W	D	L	GF	GA	GD	Pts	Promotion, qualification or relegation
20	Crewe Alexandra	46	14	10	22	43	75	−32	52	
21	Notts County (R)	46	12	14	20	45	63	−18	50	Relegation to Football League Two
22	Crawley Town (R)	46	13	11	22	53	79	−26	50	Relegation to Football League Two
23	Leyton Orient (R)	46	12	13	21	59	69	−10	49	Relegation to Football League Two
24	Yeovil Town (R)	46	10	10	26	36	75	−39	40	Relegation to Football League Two

Updated to match(es) played on 3 May 2015. Source: BBC Sport
Rules for classification: 1) Points; 2) Goal difference; 3) Number of goals scored
(R) Relegated

=== FA Cup ===
FA Cup match details
Round	Date	Opponents	Venue	Result	Score F–A	Scorers	Attendance	Ref
First round	8 November 2014	Crawley Town	H	W	1–0	Hiwula	2,355	
Second round	6 December 2014	Accrington Stanley	A	D	1–1	Clarke	1,440	
Second round replay	16 December 2014	Accrington Stanley	H	W	2–0	Gillett, Moore	6,373	
Third round	4 January 2015	Manchester United	H	L	0–2		9,264	

=== League Cup ===
League Cup match details
Round	Date	Opponents	Venue	Result	Score F–A	Scorers	Attendance	Ref
First round	12 August 2014	Gillingham	H	L	1–2	Gillett	2,283	

=== Football League Trophy ===
Football League Trophy match details
Round	Date	Opponents	Venue	Result	Score F–A	Scorers	Attendance	Ref
First round	2 September 2014	Portsmouth	H	L	1–3	Ralph	2,787	

== Squad statistics ==
Numbers in parentheses denote appearances as substitute.
Players with squad numbers struck through and marked † left the club during the playing season.
Players with names in italics and marked * were on loan from another club for the whole of their season with Yeovil.
Players listed with no appearances have been in the matchday squad but only as unused substitutes.
Key to positions: GK – Goalkeeper; DF – Defender; MF – Midfielder; FW – Forward

No.	Pos.	Nat.	Name	Apps	Goals	Apps	Goals	Apps	Goals	Apps	Goals	Apps	Goals	Yellow card	Red card
No.	Pos.	Nat.	Name	League		FA Cup		League Cup		FL Trophy		Total		Discipline	
1	GK	ENG	Chris Weale	8	0	0	0	0	0	1	0	9	0	0	0
~~2~~ †	DF	IRL	Brendan Moloney	4 (1)	0	1	0	0	0	1	0	6 (1)	0	1	0
3	DF	JAM	Nathan Smith	37 (4)	0	3	0	1	0	1	0	42 (4)	0	6	0
4	MF	ENG	Joe Edwards	33 (1)	0	4	0	1	0	0	0	38 (1)	0	7	0
~~5~~ †	DF	ENG	Aaron Martin	12	3	0	0	1	0	1	0	14	3	3	0
5	MF	ENG	Fergus Bell	1 (1)	0	0	0	0	0	0	0	1 (1)	0	0	0
6	DF	CZE	Jakub Sokolík	11	0	0	0	1	0	0	0	12	0	3	0
7	MF	IRL	Kevin Dawson	12 (5)	1	3	0	0	0	0 (1)	0	15 (6)	1	4	0
8	MF	IRL	James Berrett	19 (9)	1	2 (1)	0	1	0	0	0	22 (10)	1	5	0
9	FW	ENG	James Hayter	23 (15)	5	2 (1)	0	1	0	0 (1)	0	26 (17)	5	2	0
10	FW	ENG	A-Jay Leitch-Smith	22 (11)	2	2 (1)	0	0 (1)	0	1	0	26 (12)	2	3	0
11	MF	IRL	Sam Foley	37 (3)	2	4	0	0	0	1	0	42 (3)	2	8	0
12	GK	POL	Artur Krysiak	15	0	0	0	1	0	0	0	16	0	0	0
13	FW	ENG	Kieffer Moore	20 (10)	3	1 (1)	1	1	0	1	0	23 (11)	4	4	0
14	FW	ENG	Sam Hoskins	2 (10)	1	0	0	0 (1)	0	1	0	3 (11)	1	0	0
15	DF	ENG	Seth Nana Twumasi	18 (8)	0	2 (1)	0	1	0	1	0	22 (8)	0	2	1
16	DF	ENG	Nathan Ralph	9 (12)	0	1	0	0 (1)	0	1	1	11 (13)	1	2	0
17	MF	JAM	Joel Grant	14 (6)	3	0	0	0	0	0	0	14 (6)	3	2	0
~~18~~ †	DF	ITA	Matteo Lanzoni	0	0	0	0	0	0	0	0	0	0	0	0
~~18~~ †	MF	ENG	Jack Price *	5 (1)	0	0	0	0	0	0 (1)	0	5 (2)	0	0	0
~~18~~ †	DF	ENG	Jordan Clarke *	5	2	2	1	0	0	0	0	7	3	0	0
~~18~~ †	FW	JAM	Jamar Loza *	4 (1)	0	0	0	0	0	0	0	4 (1)	0	1	0
19	MF	ENG	Liam Davis	8	0	1	0	0	0	0	0	9	0	1	0
20	DF	ENG	Ben Nugent *	23	1	4	0	1	0	1	0	29	1	7	2
~~21~~ †	DF	ENG	Calvin Brooks	0	0	0	0	0	0	0	0	0	0	0	0
~~21~~ †	GK	ENG	Scott Loach *	6	0	0	0	0	0	0	0	6	0	0	0
~~22~~ †	GK	ENG	Gareth Stewart	0 (1)	0	0	0	0	0	0	0	0 (1)	0	0	0
23	MF	ENG	Simon Gillett	14 (3)	1	2 (2)	1	1	1	0	0	17 (5)	3	1	0
~~24~~ †	GK	ENG	Jake Kean *	5	0	0	0	0	0	0	0	5	0	0	0
~~24~~ †	DF	ENG	Ryan Inniss *	4 (2)	0	0	0	0	0	0	0	4 (2)	0	0	1
24	MF	ENG	Craig Eastmond	0 (1)	0	0	0	0	0	0	0	0 (1)	0	0	0
~~25~~ †	FW	ENG	Jordy Hiwula *	7 (1)	0	1	1	0	0	0	0	8 (1)	1	1	0
25	FW	ENG	Gozie Ugwu	21 (1)	5	0	0	0	0	0	0	21 (1)	5	0	0
26	DF	ENG	Stephen Arthurworrey *	29	2	4	0	0	0	0	0	33	2	9	0
~~27~~ †	FW	ENG	Tom Eaves *	4 (1)	0	1 (1)	0	0	0	0	0	5 (2)	0	0	0
27	DF	ENG	Byron Webster *	14	0	0	0	0	0	0	0	14	0	4	0
28	DF	ENG	Alex Smith	3 (3)	0	0	0	0	0	0	0	3 (3)	0	0	0
~~30~~ †	GK	ENG	Jed Steer *	12	0	4	0	0	0	0	0	16	0	1	0
30	MF	WAL	Josh Sheehan *	12 (1)	0	0	0	0	0	0	0	12 (1)	0	3	0
31	FW	ENG	Adam Morgan	3 (3)	1	0	0	0	0	0	0	3 (3)	1	1	0
32	DF	WAL	Liam Shephard *	20	0	0	0	0	0	0	0	20	0	0	0
35	DF	SCO	Stephen Kingsley *	12	0	0	0	0	0	0	0	12	0	2	0

=== Suspensions ===
Player	Date Received	Offence	Length of suspension	
Seth Nana Twumasi	(red card) v Gillingham, 12 August	Serious foul play	3 matches	Gillingham (A), Walsall (A), Scunthorpe United (H), League One
Ben Nugent	(yellow card) (yellow-red card) v Milton Keynes Dons, 4 October	Second bookable offence	1 match	Port Vale (A), League One
Ben Nugent	(yellow card) v Notts County, 22 November	5 cautions	1 match	Preston North End (H), League One
Ryan Inniss	(red card) v Preston North End, 29 November	Serious foul play	3 matches	Accrington Stanley (A), FA Cup, Oldham Athletic (A), Accrington Stanley (H), FA Cup
Ben Nugent	(red card) v Barnsley, 10 January	Violent conduct	4 matches	Bradford City (H), Preston North End (A), Coventry City (H), Peterborough United (A), League One

== See also ==
- 2014–15 in English football
- List of Yeovil Town F.C. seasons
