= Scott Loach =

English footballer (born 1988)

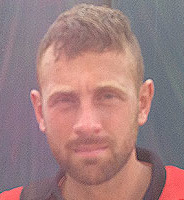
- Loach with Rotherham United in 2014

Personal information
- Full name: Scott James Loach
- Date of birth: 27 May 1988 (age 38)
- Place of birth: Nottingham, England
- Height: 6 ft 1 in (1.85 m)
- Position: Goalkeeper

Team information
- Current team: Newark Town

Youth career
- 1997–2000: Ipswich Town
- 2002–2003: Southwell United
- 2003–2004: Lincoln City

Senior career*
Years	Team	Apps	(Gls)
2004–2006	Lincoln City	0	(0)
2004	→ Bourne Town (loan)	2	(0)
2004	→ Radcliffe Olympic (loan)		
2005	→ Boston Town (loan)		
2005	→ Spalding United (loan)		
2005	→ Lincoln United (loan)	1	(0)
2005	→ Boston Town (loan)		
2006	→ Grantham Town (loan)	1	(0)
2006–2012	Watford	154	(0)
2007	→ Stafford Rangers (loan)	11	(0)
2007	→ Morecambe (loan)	2	(0)
2008	→ Bradford City (loan)	20	(0)
2012–2014	Ipswich Town	28	(0)
2014–2015	Rotherham United	2	(0)
2014	→ Bury (loan)	2	(0)
2015	→ Peterborough United (loan)	5	(0)
2015	→ Yeovil Town (loan)	6	(0)
2015–2017	Notts County	17	(0)
2017	→ York City (loan)	9	(0)
2017–2019	Hartlepool United	92	(0)
2019–2021	Barnet	59	(0)
2021–2022	Chesterfield	44	(0)
2022–2024	Derby County	0	(0)
2024	Holwell Sports	1	(0)
2025	Wakefield	3	(0)
2025–	Newark Town	30	(0)

International career
2009–2011	England U21	14	(0)
2022	England C	1	(0)
Medal record
Men's football
Representing England
UEFA European Under-21 Championship
Runner-up	2009 Sweden
- * Club domestic league appearances and goals

Scott James Loach (born 27 May 1988) is an English former professional footballer who plays as a goalkeeper for Newark Town.

Loach played for Ipswich Town, Watford and Hartlepool United. He had also spent loan spells with non-League Stafford Rangers and York City, and Football League clubs Morecambe, Bradford City, Bury, Peterborough United, Yeovil Town and Notts County. He dropped into non-league with Barnet and Chesterfield before returning to league football with Derby County. He played for England at under-21 level and in August 2010 was called up to the senior squad for the first time.

== Early and personal life ==
Loach was born in Nottingham, Nottinghamshire.

== Club career ==
=== Early career ===
Loach was a member of the academy at Ipswich Town from 1997 to 2000. Loach moved to Southwell, Nottinghamshire, attending Southwell Minster School and playing for local club Southwell United from 2002 to 2003. Loach joined Lincoln City's Centre of Excellence in April 2003, before signing a three-year scholarship in summer 2004.

In August 2004, he joined Bourne Town on loan, making two appearances. In October 2004, he played on loan for Radcliffe Olympic. He joined Boston Town in January 2005 on loan, which was extended until the end of the 2004–05 season, making 18 appearances. In August 2005, Loach was loaned to Spalding United. In November 2005, he had a one-match spell with Lincoln United. He returned to Boston Town later that month, before a period at Grantham Town in March 2006.

=== Watford ===
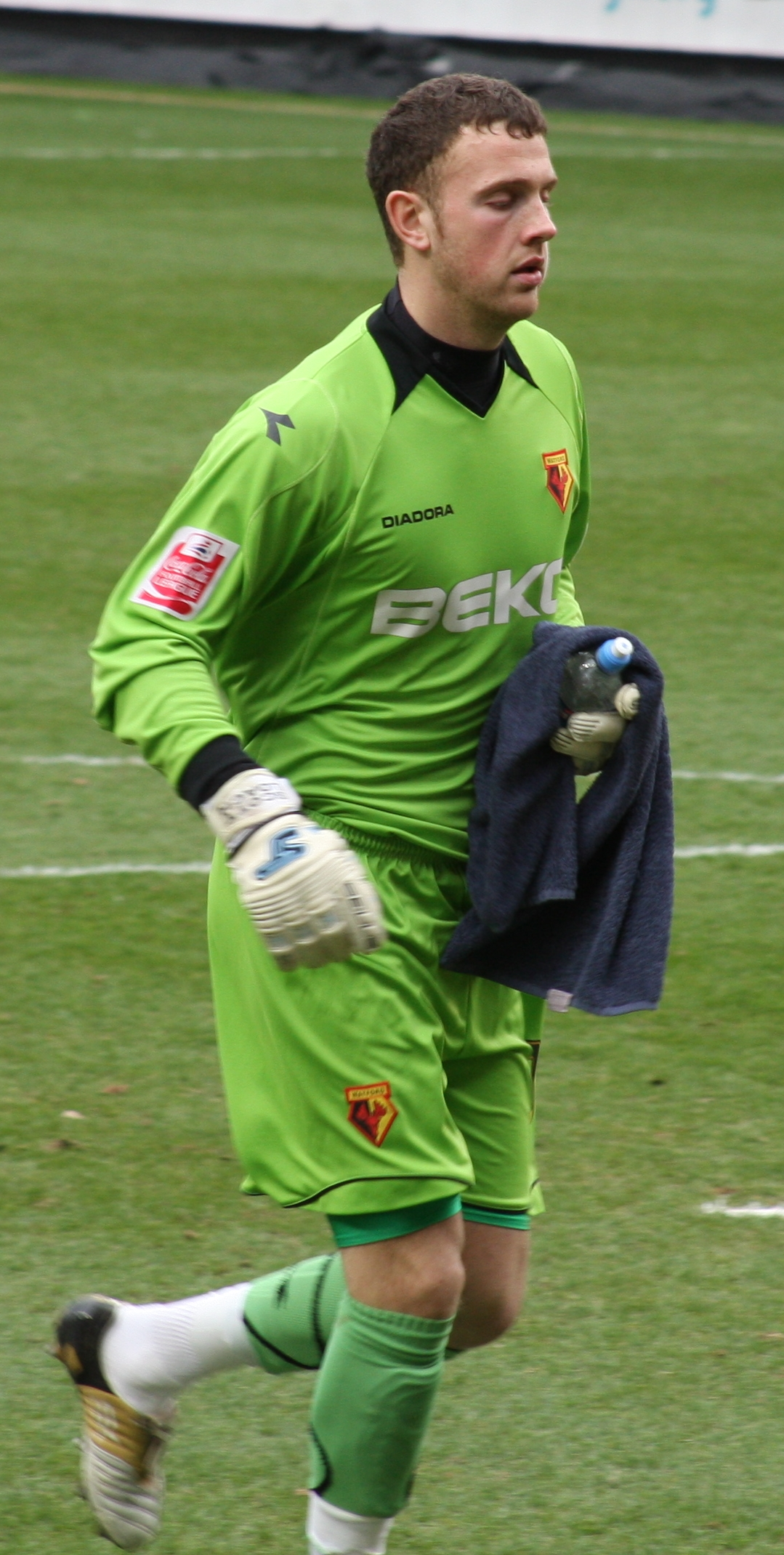
Loach playing for Watford in 2009

Despite not being offered professional terms at Lincoln City, Loach joined Watford in April 2006. He signed professional terms for Watford in June, with Lincoln City receiving a transfer fee of £50,000. In pre-season 2007 he was on trial at Leeds United with a view to a loan move. Although he played in several pre-season friendlies, the move did not come to fruition due to a transfer embargo as a result of Leeds entering administration.

In September 2007, Loach joined Conference Premier club Stafford Rangers on an initial one-month loan. It was later extended to three months, and Loach made 11 appearances for Stafford. He joined Morecambe on loan in January 2008, making his debut on 1 January in a 2–1 defeat to Stockport County. He made only one more league appearance for Morecambe, during which he saved a penalty from Macclesfield Town's Martin Gritton, before he returning to Watford after just two weeks. At the end of the month he joined Bradford City, another League Two club, on loan until the end of 2007–08 as replacement for Donovan Ricketts, who was expected to move to Queens Park Rangers until he was refused a work permit. Loach made his debut a day after joining Bradford, conceding twice in their 4–2 victory over Shrewsbury Town. He followed it up five days later with a clean sheet against Macclesfield Town after he saved a second penalty at Moss Rose in as many months. Loach played the remainder of the season with Bradford, making 20 appearances for the club, who finished in 10th place in League Two.

Loach returned to Watford and made his debut in the 1–0 League Cup win over Bristol Rovers. He made his league debut as a substitute on 20 September 2008 when he came on to replace Mart Poom in the fourth minute of a match against Reading. Loach conceded his first Watford goal when the referee and linesman gave a goal instead of a corner, an incident described as a ghost goal. The match finished in a 2–2 draw. Loach remained a regular in the Watford team for the rest of 2008–09, under the management of Aidy Boothroyd, Malky Mackay and later Brendan Rodgers.

In August 2009, FourFourTwo magazine said Loach was the 'Key Player' in Watford's season and that fans should expect a good season from the young goalkeeper. Newspaper reports linked Loach to Tottenham Hotspur as backup to Heurelho Gomes, however as Carlo Cudicini's alleged move to Portsmouth did not go through, no deal was ever made. Loach made a good start to 2009–10 including a match winning performance against Plymouth where Watford won 1–0. Loach featured in all 46 Watford league matches that season, and on 5 March 2010 extended his contract with Watford until 2013.

Loach retained his place in the team for 2010–11, and once again played all 46 league fixtures. However, he subsequently admitted that his form had dipped towards the end of that season. After 130 consecutive league appearances, Loach missed a Championship match for the first time since 2008 on 27 September 2011. He regained the place from Rene Gilmartin a few weeks later. Loach remained in the team until 18 February 2012, when he was replaced by loan player Tomasz Kuszczak. Loach returned to the Watford team on their final day of 2011–12, in their 2–1 win against Middlesbrough.

=== Ipswich Town ===
Loach completed what he called his "dream move" by returning to his boyhood club for an undisclosed fee on 19 July 2012. He made his debut on 14 August in a 3–1 win against Bristol Rovers in the League Cup. He kept his first clean sheet in a 1–0 win against former club Watford on 21 August.

Ipswich released Loach following 2013–14 where he had been replaced in the first team by Dean Gerken, having made only 33 appearances for Ipswich.

=== Rotherham United ===
Loach signed for newly promoted Championship club Rotherham United on 5 June 2014. On 10 November 2014, after only having made four appearances for Rotherham, Loach was loaned out to League One club Bury until 17 January 2015.

On 2 March 2015, following an injury to Artur Krysiak, Loach joined League One club Yeovil Town on a one-month emergency loan.

=== Notts County ===
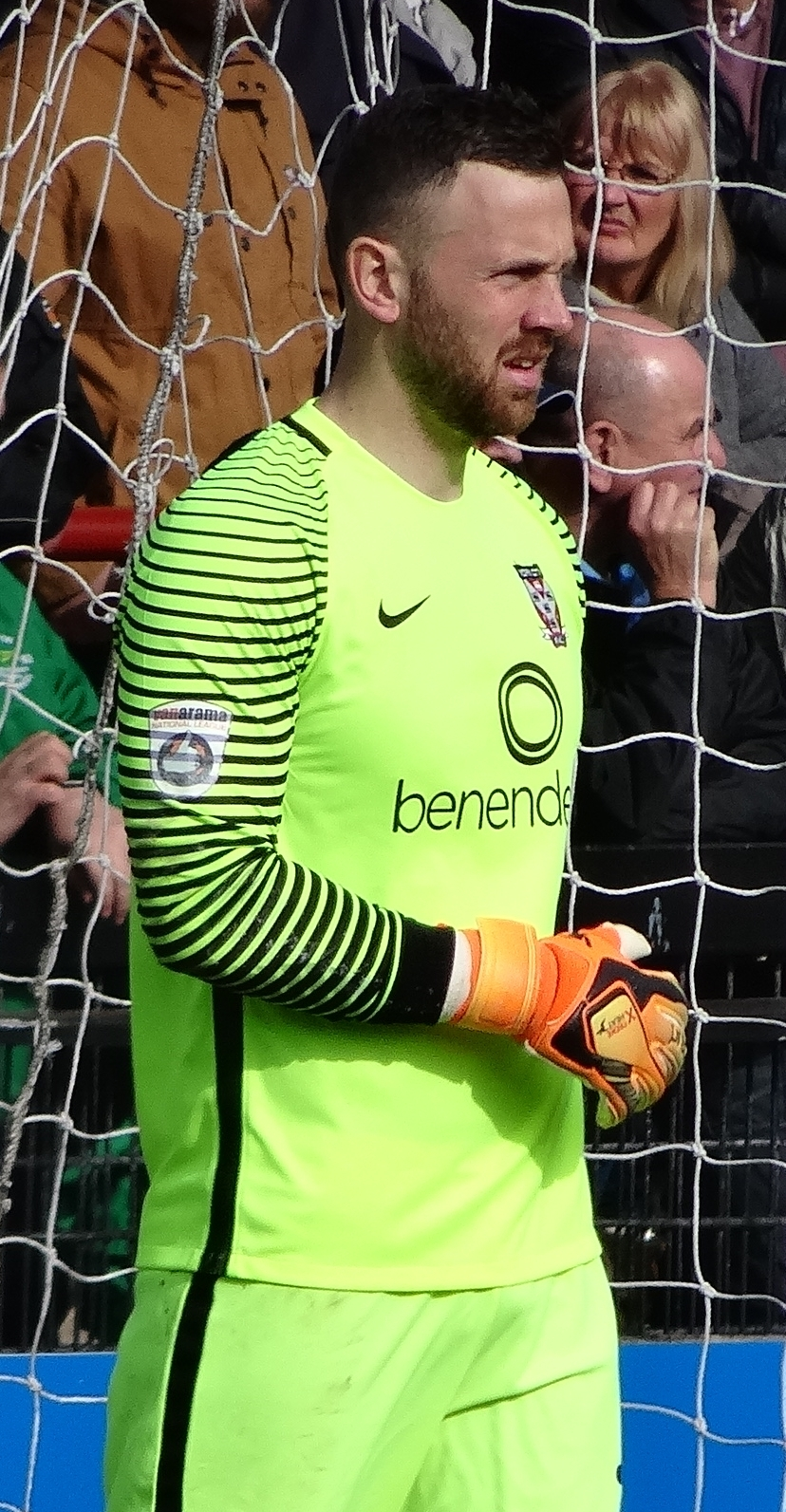
Loach playing for York City in 2017

On 15 July 2015, Loach signed for newly relegated League Two club Notts County on a two-year contract.

On 23 March 2017, Loach joined National League club York City on loan until the end of 2016–17, to replace the injured Kyle Letheren. He made his debut two days later, starting in a 1–0 away defeat to Dagenham & Redbridge. Loach remained in goal after Letheren returned to fitness, making nine appearances. His final appearance came in a 2–2 home draw with Forest Green Rovers on 29 April 2017, which saw York relegated to the National League North with a 21st-place finish in the National League. He returned to Notts County after this match, as he was not eligible to play for York in the 2017 FA Trophy Final. He was subsequently released by Notts County, and ruled out joining York permanently.

=== Hartlepool United ===
On 9 June 2017, Loach signed for newly relegated National League club Hartlepool United. At the end of the 2017–18 season, Loach won both Fans Player and Players' Player of the Year Awards.

He also won the Players' Player of the Year Award in the 2018–19 season. Loach played his 100th consecutive appearance in all competitions for Hartlepool during their 3–2 victory over Salford City in April 2019.

At the end of the 2018–19 season, Loach left Hartlepool following the expiry of his contract.

=== Barnet ===
Loach signed for National League club Barnet on 14 June 2019. He played 72 times in two seasons before leaving the club at the end of the 2020-21 season.

=== Chesterfield ===
On 11 June 2021, Loach joined fellow National League club Chesterfield. He was the regular first choice keeper during his only season at the club making 48 appearances.

=== Derby County ===
On 13 July 2022, Loach joined League One club Derby County on a free transfer. He was used as a back-up keeper as he made three appearances during the 2022–23 season, all in the EFL Trophy. He was offered a new contract in May 2023. Loach signed a one-year contract extension on 21 June 2023. Loach spent the 2023–24 season as third choice keeper and failed to make a first team appearance, he did feature as an unused substitute when second choice keeper Josh Vickers was unable to play.

On 18 May 2024, it was announced that Loach would leave Derby at the end of his contract on 30 June 2024, after three appearances over two seasons.

On 18 June 2024, Loach announced his retirement from professional football after a twenty-year career and over 500 appearances, Loach retired to concentrate on a coaching career.

On 31 March 2025, Loach signed for Northern Counties East League Division One Wakefield AFC for the remainder of the season.

== International career ==
In February 2009, Loach's good form at club level earned him his first England under-21 international call-up by manager Stuart Pearce for a friendly match against Ecuador's senior team in Malaga. Loach made his international debut when he came on as a late replacement for Tom Heaton, as England lost 3–2.

In May 2009, Loach was named in the England Under-21 squad for the Under-21 Championships that take place in Sweden in June 2009. He only played in one match as Joe Hart was first choice. He started in goal for England in the 4–0 defeat to Germany in the final of the Under-21 Championships in place of the suspended Hart and was highly culpable for the second German goal. With Hart and Joe Lewis ineligible for the under-21s, Loach began to play regularly thereafter.

On 10 August 2010, after Ben Foster and Paul Robinson withdrew from the squad, Loach received his first call up to the full England squad for the friendly against Hungary. The following month, after Scott Carson withdrew from the England squad due to a bereavement, he received a second call up to the full England squad for the Euro 2012 qualifiers against Bulgaria and Switzerland.

== Career statistics ==
As of end of 2025–26 season

Appearances and goals by club, season and competition
Club	Season	League			FA Cup		League Cup		Other		Total	
Club	Season	Division	Apps	Goals	Apps	Goals	Apps	Goals	Apps	Goals	Apps	Goals
Lincoln City	2004–05	League Two	0	0	0	0	0	0	0	0	0	0
Lincoln City	2005–06	League Two	0	0	0	0	0	0	0	0	0	0
Lincoln City	Total		0	0	0	0	0	0	0	0	0	0
Bourne Town (loan)	2004–05	United Counties League; Premier Division	2	0	—		—		—		2	0
Lincoln United (loan)	2005–06	Northern Premier League; Premier Division	1	0	—		—		—		1	0
Grantham Town (loan)	2005–06	Southern League; Premier Division	1	0	—		—		—		1	0
Watford	2006–07	Premier League	0	0	0	0	0	0	—		0	0
Watford	2007–08	Championship	0	0	0	0	0	0	0	0	0	0
Watford	2008–09	Championship	31	0	3	0	4	0	—		38	0
Watford	2009–10	Championship	46	0	1	0	0	0	—		47	0
Watford	2010–11	Championship	46	0	0	0	0	0	—		46	0
Watford	2011–12	Championship	31	0	1	0	0	0	—		32	0
Watford	Total		154	0	5	0	4	0	0	0	163	0
Stafford Rangers (loan)	2007–08	Conference Premier	11	0	—		—		—		11	0
Morecambe (loan)	2007–08	League Two	2	0	—		—		1 (Note: Appearance(s) in Football League Trophy)	0	3	0
Bradford City (loan)	2007–08	League Two	20	0	—		—		—		20	0
Ipswich Town	2012–13	Championship	22	0	1	0	2	0	—		25	0
Ipswich Town	2013–14	Championship	6	0	2	0	0	0	—		8	0
Ipswich Town	Total		28	0	3	0	2	0	—		33	0
Rotherham United	2014–15	Championship	2	0	0	0	2	0	—		4	0
Bury (loan)	2014–15	League Two	2	0	—		—		1	0	3	0
Peterborough United (loan)	2014–15	League One	5	0	—		—		—		5	0
Yeovil Town (loan)	2014–15	League One	6	0	—		—		—		6	0
Notts County	2015–16	League Two	14	0	0	0	0	0	2	0	16	0
Notts County	2016–17	League Two	3	0	1	0	0	0	3 (Note: Appearances in EFL Trophy)	0	7	0
Notts County	Total		17	0	1	0	0	0	5	0	23	0
York City (loan)	2016–17	National League	9	0	—		—		—		9	0
Hartlepool United	2017–18	National League	46	0	2	0	—		1 (Note: Appearance(s) in FA Trophy)	0	49	0
Hartlepool United	2018–19	National League	46	0	3	0	—		2	0	51	0
Hartlepool United	Total		92	0	5	0	0	0	3	0	100	0
Barnet	2019–20	National League	35	0	3	0	—		7 (Note: Five appearances in FA Trophy, two appearances in National League playoffs)	0	45	0
Barnet	2020–21	National League	24	0	2	0	—		1	0	27	0
Barnet	Total		59	0	5	0	0	0	8	0	72	0
Chesterfield	2021–22	National League	44	0	2	0	—		2 (Note: Appearances in National League play-offs)	0	48	0
Derby County	2022–23	League One	0	0	0	0	0	0	3	0	3	0
Derby County	2023–24	League One	0	0	0	0	0	0	0	0	0	0
Derby County	Total		0	0	0	0	0	0	3	0	3	0
Holwell Sports	2024–25	United Counties League; Division One	1	0	0	0	0	0	0	0	1	0
Wakefield	2024–25	Northern Counties East Football League; Division One	3	0	0	0	0	0	1	0	4	0
Newark Town	2025–26	United Counties League; Premier Division North	30	0	2	0	0	0	4	0	36	0
Career total			489	0	23	0	8	0	28	0	548	0

== Honours ==
England U21

- UEFA European Under-21 Championship runner-up: 2009

Individual

- Hartlepool United Player of the Year: 2017–18
- Hartlepool United Players' Player of the Year: 2017–18
- Hartlepool United Players' Player of the Year: 2018–19
