= Joseph Greene =

Joseph or Joe Greene may refer to:

== Sports ==
- Joe Greene (born 1946), American football player, known as "Mean Joe Greene"
- Joe Greene (baseball) (1911–1989), American catcher in Negro league baseball
- Joe Greene (boxer) (born 1986), American middleweight
- Joe Greene (long jumper) (born 1967), American long jump athlete

== Other ==
- Joe Greene (American songwriter) (1915–1986), American songwriter
- Joe Greene (American singer), gospel/soul singer and songwriter, active in the 1970s
- Joe Greene (Ontario politician) (1920–1978), Liberal legislator in Canadian House of Commons, 1963–1972
- Joe L. Greene (born 1937), American labor union leader
- Joseph Greene (Newfoundland politician) (1890–1969), accountant and political figure in Newfoundland
- Joseph Greene (writer) (1914–1990), American science fiction author and editor
- Joseph N. Greene (1920–2010), US diplomat
- Joseph Reay Greene (1836–1903), Irish zoologist
- Joseph A. Greene, state senator in South Carolina
- J. E. Greene (Joseph E. Greene, 1944–2022), known as Joe, American materials scientist

== See also ==
- Greene (disambiguation)
- Joseph Green (disambiguation)
