= Seth Nana Twumasi =

Professional footballer (born 1990)

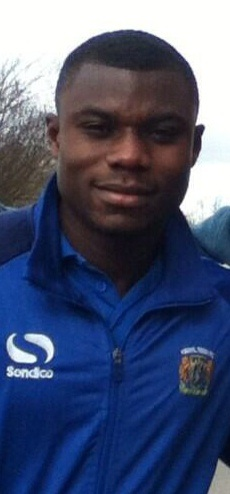
- Twumasi in 2014

Personal information
- Full name: Seth Nana Ofori-Twumasi
- Date of birth: 15 May 1990 (age 36)
- Place of birth: Accra, Ghana
- Height: 5 ft 8 in (1.73 m)
- Position: Defender

Team information
- Current team: Oakham United

Youth career
- 2000–2001: Old Isleworthians
- 2001–2009: Chelsea

Senior career*
Years	Team	Apps	(Gls)
2009–2010	Chelsea	0	(0)
2009–2010	→ Dagenham & Redbridge (loan)	8	(2)
2010–2011	Peterborough United	11	(0)
2011	→ Northampton Town (loan)	11	(0)
2011–2013	Northampton Town	5	(0)
2013–2015	Yeovil Town	28	(0)
2015–2016	Newport County	10	(0)
2016–2018	Maidstone United	74	(0)
2018–2021	Maidenhead United	80	(0)
2021–2022	Dover Athletic	17	(0)
2022–	Oakham United	1	(0)

International career^{‡}
2005–2006	England U16	5	(0)
2006–2007	England U17	15	(0)
2007	England U18	1	(0)
2009	England U20	2	(0)
- * Club domestic league appearances and goals as of 21:07, 25 March 2022 (UTC) ‡ National team caps and goals as of 21:50, 26 December 2009 (UTC)

Seth Nana Ofori-Twumasi (born 15 May 1990) is a professional footballer who plays as a defender or midfielder for Peterborough & District League side Oakham United. Born in Ghana, he is a former youth international for England.

== Early life ==
Twumasi was born in Accra, Ghana and moved to England at the age of nine. He grew up on the same housing estate in West London as Carlton Cole.

== Club career ==
=== Chelsea ===
Twumasi started his career as a Chelsea Youth Team player, eventually becoming captain. Twumasi signed his first professional contract with Chelsea in 2007

It was announced on 13 November 2009, that Twumasi had joined League Two club Dagenham & Redbridge on a one-month loan deal. He made his Football League debut on 14 November for Dagenham & Redbridge in their 1–0 away victory against Accrington Stanley. His loan was extended on 17 December, until 9 January 2010.

=== Peterborough United ===
Twumasi signed for League One club Peterborough United on a three-year contract on 1 July 2010. He signed from Chelsea on a free transfer.

=== Northampton Town ===
Since signing for the team he was a regular member of the first team squad but at the beginning of 2011–12 season he ruptured a cruciate knee ligament in a 3–0 win against AFC Wimbledon and subsequently missed the rest of the season. He has since undergone knee reconstruction surgery. Twumasi was released at the end of the 2012–13 season by Northampton.

=== Yeovil Town ===
On 30 July 2013, Twumasi signed for Football League Championship side Yeovil Town.

Twumasi was released by Yeovil at the end of the 2014–15 season following their relegation to League Two.

=== Newport County ===
On 25 June 2015, Twumasi signed for League Two club Newport County. He made his competitive debut for Newport on 11 August, versus Wolverhampton Wanderers in the Football League Cup first round. Twumasi made his league debut for Newport in the League Two match versus Stevenage on 15 August 2015. He was released by Newport on 10 May 2016 at the end of his contract.

=== Maidstone United ===
Twumasi made what he thought was a one-off appearance for Maidstone United against Bromley in the Kent Senior Cup in September 2016. However, a recent rule change meant that by playing for the Stones, he rendered himself unable to move to a Football League club until the transfer window opened in January 2017, scuppering a proposed move to Cheltenham Town. Twumasi subsequently decided to stay with part-time Maidstone in non league's top tier, the National League, while also setting up a football academy in his home country Ghana.

After making a number of impressive appearances for the club, Stones manager Jay Saunders revealed in late December 2016 that he did not expect the player to turn out for Maidstone again, citing that he still had Football League interest and was also busy setting up his academy. However, in early January 2017, Saunders declared that he expected Twumasi to now remain with the club.

=== Maidenhead United ===
Twumasi joined Maidenhead United on a permanent deal on 17 November 2018.

=== Dover Athletic ===
On 25 June 2021, Twumasi joined fellow National League side Dover Athletic following three seasons at Maidenhead. Following relegation, Twumasi left the club after one season.

== International career ==
Twumasi is eligible to represent either Ghana, where he was born, or England, where he grew up from the age of nine. He represented England at under-16, under-17, under-18 and under-20 levels. He played at the 2007 FIFA U-17 World Cup, 2007 UEFA European Under-17 Championship and 2009 FIFA U-20 World Cup. Before a match between England under-20s and their Ghanaian counterparts in the U-20 World Cup in 2009, Twumasi stated he has no doubts over his allegiance, saying: "The game will be emotional, but I'm English now and that's who I want to play for, so there will be no love lost between us."

== Personal life ==
Twumasi founded the Mirage Football Academy in Ghana.

== Career statistics ==
As of end of 2021–22 season

Appearances and goals by club, season and competition
Club	Season	League			FA Cup		League Cup		Other		Total	
Club	Season	Division	Apps	Goals	Apps	Goals	Apps	Goals	Apps	Goals	Apps	Goals
Dagenham & Redbridge (loan)	2009–10	League Two	8	2	0	0	0	0	0	0	8	2
Peterborough United	2010–11	League One	11	0	1	0	3	0	1 (Note: Appearances in Football League Trophy)	0	16	0
Northampton Town (loan)	2010–11	League Two	11	0	0	0	0	0	0	0	11	0
Northampton Town	2011–12	League Two	5	0	0	0	1	0	0	0	6	0
Northampton Town	2012–13	League Two	0	0	0	0	0	0	0	0	0	0
Northampton Town	Northampton total		5	0	0	0	1	0	0	0	6	0
Yeovil Town	2013–14	Championship	3	0	0	0	0	0	—		3	0
Yeovil Town	2014–15	League One	25	0	3	0	1	0	1	0	30	0
Yeovil Town	Yeovil total		28	0	3	0	1	0	1	0	33	0
Newport County	2015–16	League Two	10	0	0	0	1	0	1	0	12	0
Maidstone United	2016–17	National League	27	0	3	0	—		0	0	30	0
Maidstone United	2017–18	National League	33	0	2	0	—		4 (Note: Appearance in the FA Trophy)	0	39	0
Maidstone United	2018–19	National League	14	0	1	0	—		0	0	15	0
Maidstone United	Maidstone total		74	0	6	0	—		4	0	84	0
Maidenhead United	2018–19	National League	23	0	0	0	—		1	0	24	0
Maidenhead United	2019–20	National League	31	0	2	0	—		2	0	35	0
Maidenhead United	2020–21	National League	26	0	0	0	—		0	0	26	0
Maidenhead United	Maidenhead total		80	0	2	0	—		3	0	85	0
Dover Athletic	2021–22	National League	17	0	1	0	—		0	0	18	0
Career total			244	2	13	0	6	0	10	0	273	2
