= Fergus Bell =

English footballer

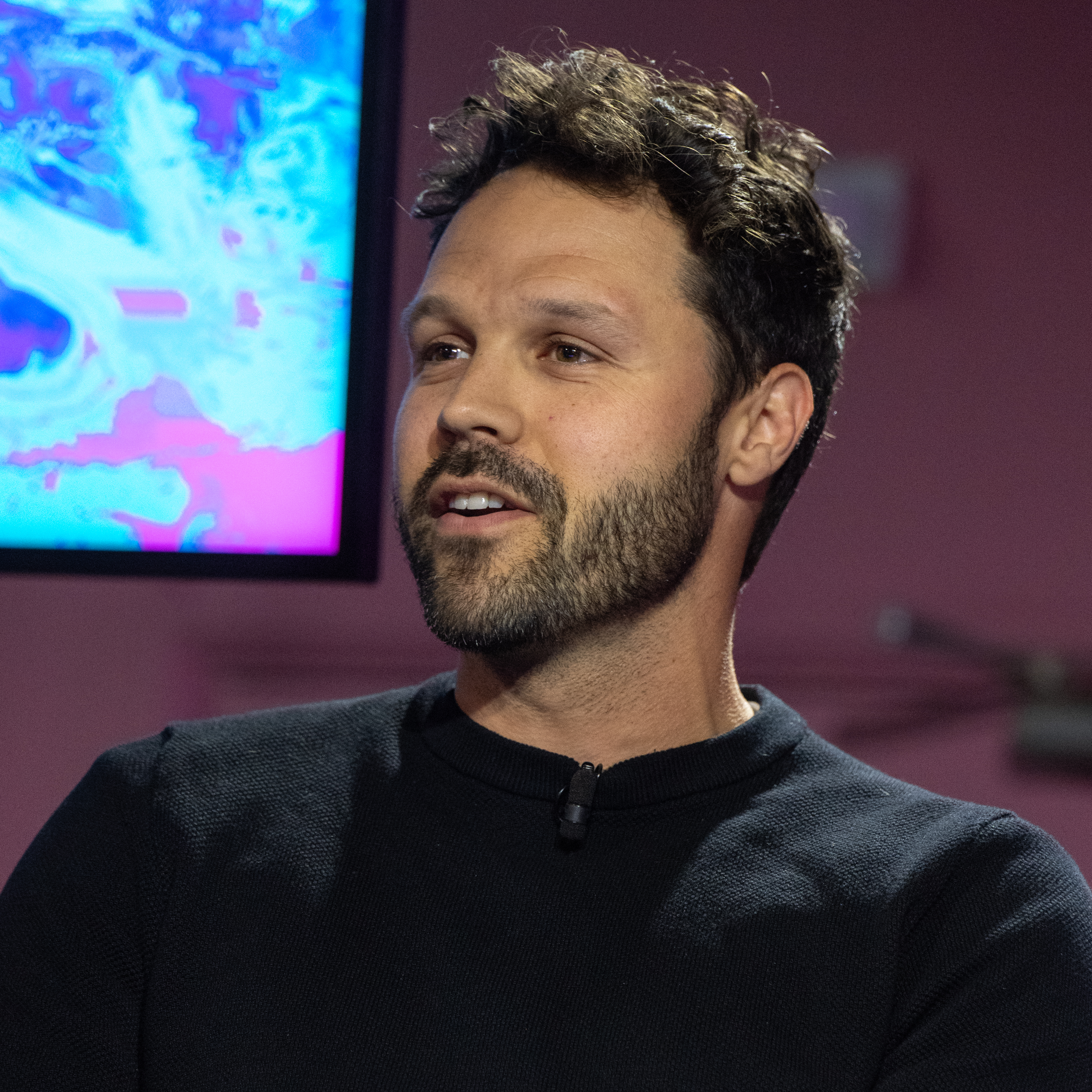
- At SXSW London, June 2026

Personal information
- Date of birth: 25 January 1991 (age 35)
- Place of birth: Wandsworth, London
- Position: Midfielder

Youth career
- 2005–2007: Sunderland
- 2007–2010: Hibernian

Senior career*
Years	Team	Apps	(Gls)
2010–2011	Jerez Industrial	26	(5)
2012–2013	Mechelen	3	(0)
2013	Heist	1	(0)
2013–2014	Monza	2	(0)
2014–2015	Mansfield Town	16	(1)
2015	Yeovil Town	2	(0)
2015	Torquay United	6	(0)
Total		56	(6)
- * Club domestic league appearances and goals as of 21:43, 6 January 2016 (UTC)

Fergus Bell (born 25 January 1991) is an English former footballer who played as a midfielder for Jerez Industrial, Mechelen, Heist, Monza, Mansfield Town, Yeovil Town and Torquay United. Bell currently operates as a property developer.

== Career ==
=== Early career ===
Bell played youth football with Sunderland and Hibernian. He was a member of the Hibernian youth side that won the under-19 league and Scottish Youth Cup double in the 2008–09 season, scoring five goals during the cup run. He was also a member of Hibs' East of Scotland Shield winning side in 2008–09. Bell was one of six players in the side who were given new contracts by Hibs following their success. However, Bell left Hibernian in 2010 without making a senior appearance for the club.

=== Jerez Industrial ===
In September 2010, Bell joined the Glenn Hoddle Academy in Spain, which aimed to offer a route back to professional football for players released by their clubs. Six days later, the academy took over Spanish club Jerez Industrial in the fourth-tier Tercera División, giving Bell the opportunity to play senior football. He went on to make 26 league appearances, scoring 5 goals, but could not prevent relegation after the club received a points deduction. By the end of the season the academy had cut ties with Jerez Industrial and relocated to the UK. After leaving Spain, Bell had a trial spell with Blackburn Rovers, but was not offered a contract.

=== Mechelen ===
Bell moved to Mechelen in the Belgian Third Division during the 2012–13 season, although his spell at the club was disrupted by injuries. After a conflict with manager Thierry Pister, Bell's contract was terminated.

=== KSK Heist ===
In July 2013, Bell signed for Heist in the Belgian Second Division. He played one game for the club, a 7–2 defeat at home to Royal Antwerp.

=== A.C. Monza Brianza 1912 ===
After just seven weeks at KSK Heist, Bell signed for Italian Lega Pro Seconda Divisione club Monza along with Alex Fisher, who had now been a teammate of Bell's at each of his four clubs.

He made two league appearances for the Biancorossi, making a further four appearances in the Coppa Italia Lega Pro as Monza reached the final.

=== Mansfield Town ===
In July 2014 Bell joined Mansfield Town, along with Alex Fisher. Bell went on to make 21 appearances in all competitions.

=== Yeovil Town ===
On 29 January 2015, Bell signed for League One side Yeovil Town until the end of the season, having been released from his contract with Mansfield. He made just two league appearances for the club, although he also featured in Yeovil's Somerset Premier Cup campaign where he scored two goals in the semi-final. He was released at the end of the season following Yeovil's relegation to League Two.

=== Torquay United ===
On 19 September 2015, Bell signed for National League side Torquay United on non-contract terms. Bell made six appearances for the Gulls before being released by manager Kevin Nicholson, who described Bell as being on an 'unsustainable deal' and saying the player was 'losing money every day just turning up'.
