= Joseph John Green =

Joseph John Green (1824 – 11 February 1903) was an Australian leather merchant. He founded a warehouse in Hindley Street, Adelaide, making boot uppers and supplying leather and grindery (Note: A "grindery" sold and sharpened knives and other cutting tools.) to the bootmaking trade. He was a prominent community leader and philanthropist.

== History ==
Green was employed at a leather factory before emigrating to South Australia on the barque Athenian, arriving in March 1849, one of 111 on board.

He had a residence at Middleton in 1865.

He was employed in various capacities before striking out on his own in 1866 in the leather trade, with a workshop and warehouse at 75 Hindley Street, Adelaide, the first such in the colony. The shop was previously a boot and shoe shop operated by John C. Waite. It is not known whether Green was previously employed by Waite.

In July 1869 the warehouse moved to 87 Hindley Street.

In 1884 Green handed over management of the warehouse to his son, George Green, who, with his brother Matthew, had been taken into partnership.

== Public life ==
In the early days of the Colony, Green took a leading role in a political association which was agitating for responsible government and a State constitution. This led to the passing of the original Constitution Act. In later years he was associated with numerous philanthropic associations, charitable institutions and civic associations:

- In December 1881 he was the successful candidate for councillor, Gawler Ward of Adelaide City Council and in November 1882 he was reelected unopposed.
- He was active in the preliminary arrangements for the Jubilee Exhibition
- He was President of the Chamber of Manufactures 1889–1891
- He was a prominent member of the Brougham Place Congregational Church in North Adelaide
- He was treasurer of the South Australian auxiliary of the British and Foreign Bible Society
- Treasurer of the Adelaide Benevolent and Strangers' Friend Society
- Trustee of Somerset Cottages, in Margaret Street, Walkerville
- Treasurer of the Adelaide City Mission

== Family ==
Green married Sarah Ellen Smith (c. 1831 – 17 April 1915) at Freeman Street Congregational Church on 30 November 1852.

- Emily Caroline Green (c. 1855 – 10 July 1936) married Arthur Hamilton Scarfe ( –1917) on 19 June 1878
- Ellen Green (1857 – 31 March 1931) married John Limbert ( – 21 April 1922) on 9 February 1888
- George Green (1859 – 21 April 1927) married Maria Hobson F. Sanderson (1860–) on 19 July 1883. Partner, J. J. Green & Sons but withdrew and set up as antiques purchasing agent and consultant.
- Matthew "Math" Green (1864 – 5 January 1930) married Lizzie Wigzell ( – ), stepdaughter of J. N. Hines on 21 April 1888. Partner, J. J. Green & Sons
- Sarah "Sed" Green (1866 – 11 July 1949) married Herbert Arthur Day ( – ) on 10 May 1893
- Joseph Green (1870 – 9 January 1894)
- May Green (1876 – ) married Fred. W. Johns ( – ) on 17 October 1901

They had a home on Pennington Terrace, North Adelaide
