= Dafydd Jones (footballer) =

Welsh footballer

Personal information
- Full name: Dafydd Rhys Jones
- Date of birth: 5 June 1998 (age 28)
- Place of birth: Abergavenny, Wales
- Height: 1.70 m (5 ft 7 in)
- Position: Midfielder

Team information
- Current team: Tredegar Town

Youth career
- –2015: Newport County

Senior career*
Years	Team	Apps	(Gls)
2015–2017	Newport County	1	(0)
2016–2017	→ Monmouth Town (loan)	12	(9)
2017	Aberystwyth Town	5	(0)
2017–2018	Monmouth Town		
2022–	Tredegar Town	6	(2)
- * Club domestic league appearances and goals as of 06:47, 1 May 2017 (UTC)

Dafydd Rhys Jones (born 5 June 1998) is a Welsh footballer who plays as a midfielder for Tredegar Town.

== Career ==
Jones was a product of the Newport County academy. He made his senior debut for Newport in the Football League Cup first round match versus Wolverhampton Wanderers on 11 August 2015 as a second-half substitute. Wolves won the game 2–1. On 31 August 2016, Jones joined Welsh Football League Division One club Monmouth Town on loan until 31 January 2017. In December 2016 Newport County confirmed Jones would be released by Newport at the conclusion of his contract on 31 January 2017.

Following his release, Jones joined Welsh Premier League side Aberystwyth Town. but after 5 appearances he re-joined Monmouth Town on a permanent deal.
