= Joseph A. Greene =

American politician

Joseph A. Greene (died November 26, 1871) was a state senator in South Carolina during the Reconstruction era, representing Orangeburg County in the 48th and 49th South Carolina General Assemblies from 1868 till 1871.

He succeeded B. F. Randolph who was assassinated in 1868.

Prior to being elected to the senate he was the clerk of Orangeburg County. He was a Radical Republican.

He died from an illness Sunday November 26, 1871 while holding office.
