= Kamel Chergui =

French footballer (born 1993)

Personal information
- Date of birth: 16 April 1993 (age 33)
- Place of birth: Saint-Étienne, France
- Height: 1.79 m (5 ft 10 in)
- Position: Right winger

Youth career
- 2008–2013: Saint-Étienne

Senior career*
| Years | Team | Apps | (Gls) |
| 2010–2013 | Saint-Étienne B | 67 | (6) |
| 2013–2015 | Auxerre B | 42 | (0) |
| 2014–2015 | Grenoble | 9 | (2) |
| 2015–2016 | Châteauroux B | 11 | (5) |
| 2015–2018 | Châteauroux | 36 | (7) |
| 2019–2020 | Le Puy | 31 | (7) |
| 2020–2022 | Créteil | 59 | (5) |
| 2020 | Créteil B | 1 | (0) |
| 2023 | Saint-Priest | 11 | (1) |
- * Club domestic league appearances and goals as of 27 May 2023

Kamel Chergui (born 16 April 1993) is a French professional footballer who plays as a right winger.

== Career ==
Chergui made his professional debut for Châteauroux in a 3–2 Ligue 2 win over Brest on 28 July 2017.

In January 2019, Chergui signed for Le Puy. He moved to Créteil in July 2020.

== Personal life ==
Chergui is of Algerian descent.
