= Scott Barrow (footballer) =

Welsh footballer (born 1988)

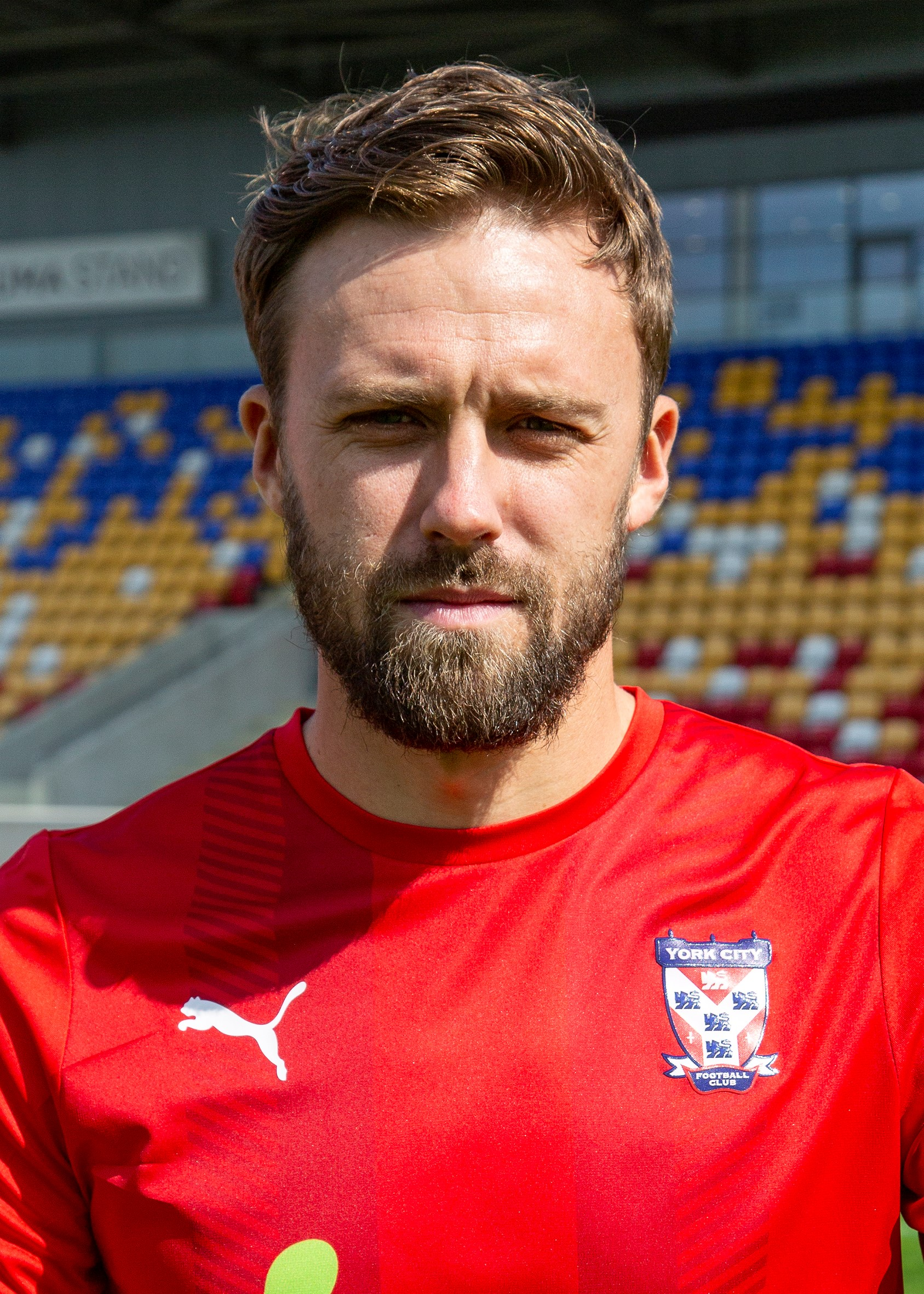
- Barrow with York City in 2021

Personal information
- Full name: Scott Edward Barrow
- Date of birth: 19 October 1988 (age 38)
- Place of birth: Swansea, Wales
- Height: 6 ft 0 in (1.83 m)
- Position: Defender

Team information
- Current team: Darlington
- Number: 3

Youth career
- Swansea City

Senior career*
Years	Team	Apps	(Gls)
2006	Briton Ferry Athletic		
2006–2010	Port Talbot Town	107	(14)
2010–2013	Tamworth	110	(9)
2014–2015	Macclesfield Town	38	(2)
2015–2016	Newport County	34	(2)
2016–2017	Merthyr Town		
2017–2020	Gateshead	108	(6)
2020–2022	York City	43	(1)
2023–2024	York City	0	(0)
2024	→ Darlington (loan)	19	(0)
2024–	Darlington	61	(1)
- * Club domestic league appearances and goals as of 06:50, 25th November 2025 (UTC)

Scott Edward Barrow (born 19 October 1988) is a Welsh professional footballer who plays as a left-back or centre-back for National League North club Darlington.

== Career ==
Born in Swansea, Barrow began his career with his hometown club Swansea City in their centre of excellence but was released at the age of 17 having never made an appearance for the club.

=== Port Talbot ===
After a brief spell with local side Briton Ferry Athletic, Barrow joined Welsh Premier League side Port Talbot Town. He played over 100 times for Port Talbot, winning semi-professional caps for Wales and being nominated for the 2009–10 Welsh Premier League young player of the year award.

=== Tamworth ===
Barrow joined Tamworth in 2010, making 110 league appearances in 3 years before a serious knee injury put an end to the season.

=== Newport County ===
After a season with Macclesfield, Barrow joined League Two club Newport County in July 2015. He made his football league debut on 8 August 2015 for Newport against Cambridge United. Barrow scored his first football league goal on 12 September 2015 against Morecambe. He was released by Newport on 10 May 2016 at the end of his contract.

=== Merthyr Town ===
Barrow joined Southern League Premier Division side Merthyr Town in August 2016 following his release from Newport.

=== Gateshead ===
After one season with the Martyrs he moved to Gateshead in June 2017.

=== York City ===
On 7 August 2020, Barrow followed his old manager from Gateshead, Steve Watson, to York City. Following injury, he departed at the end of the 2021–22 season, remaining at the club behind the scenes, before signing a new deal in July 2023.

=== Darlington ===
After Watson became manager of National League North strugglers Darlington at the end of 2023, Barrow joined him at the club on 4 January 2024, on loan until the end of the season. He was a regular in the starting eleven as the team avoided relegation with one match to spare. Barrow was released by York at the end of the 2023–24 season, and returned to Darlington on a one-year contract on 1 July 2024.

== Honours ==
Individual

- Welsh Premier League Team of the Year: 2009–10
