= John-Christophe Ayina =

French footballer (born 1991)

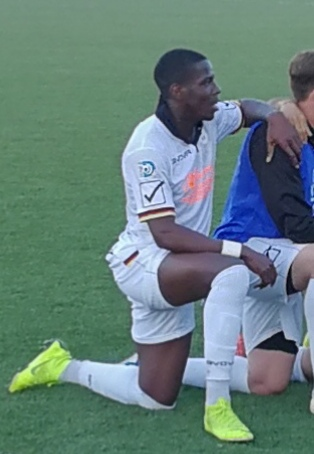

Personal information
- Full name: John-Christophe Kloblavi Ayina
- Date of birth: 9 April 1991 (age 35)
- Place of birth: Rouen, France
- Height: 1.81 m (5 ft 11 in)
- Position: Forward

Youth career
- 2007–2009: Guingamp

Senior career*
Years	Team	Apps	(Gls)
2009	Guingamp B	2	(0)
2009–2011	Paris Saint-Germain B	30	(3)
2012	Quevilly	10	(2)
2012–2013	Córdoba	5	(0)
2013	→ Écija (loan)	17	(3)
2013–2014	Racing Santander	17	(5)
2014–2015	Getafe B	12	(2)
2015–2016	Rochdale	0	(0)
2016	Newport County	14	(1)
2016–2018	Virtus Francavilla	32	(3)
2018	Bisceglie	15	(0)
2018	Fidelis Andria	2	(0)
2018–2019	Savoia	18	(2)
2019–2020	Nardò	5	(0)
2020	Ellera Calcio		
2020–2021	Pirin Blagoevgrad	14	(3)
2021–2023	Thonon Evian	15	(0)
2024	Vevey-Sports	14	(3)
- * Club domestic league appearances and goals as of 20:15, 1 December 2025 (UTC)

John-Christophe Kloblavi Ayina (born 9 April 1991) is a French professional footballer who most recently played as a forward for Vevey-Sports.

== Career ==
Ayina made his professional debuts in 2009 with Guingamp's reserve team. Shortly after, he joined Paris Saint-Germain. In July 2011, he was released.

In October 2011, Ayina began training with Quevilly, but only could be registered in January of the following year. On 20 March 2012, he scored twice against Marseille, taking the club to the semifinals of Coupe de France.

On 9 July 2012, Ayina signed a contract with Segunda División club Córdoba. On 21 August, he made his league debut, coming off the bench to replace Fuentes in the final minutes of a 0–0 away draw against Real Murcia.

On 4 January 2013, Ayina was loaned to Écija Balompié in the Segunda División B, until June. On 2 September he rescinded his link with the Andalusians, and moved to Racing Santander in the same division.

Ayina appeared in 17 matches during the campaign (only six starts, however) as the Cantabrians returned to the second level at first attempt. On 28 August 2014 he signed for Getafe, being assigned to the reserves also in the third division.

On 6 November 2015, after being sparingly used by his previous club, Ayina signed for EFL League One club Rochdale. He was released on 8 January of the following year, after only one appearance in the Football League Trophy.

On 21 January 2016, Ayina signed for EFL League Two club Newport County. He made his Newport debut as a second-half substitute versus Dagenham & Redbridge on 23 January 2016, scoring the first goal in the 2–2 draw. He was offered a new contract by Newport at the end of the 2015–16 season but the offer was withdrawn and he was released after he failed to accept the contract by the deadline of 10 June 2016.

In January 2017 he moved to Italy by signing for Virtus Francavilla. In January 2018 he was signed by Bisceglie. After spells at Fidelis Andria, Savoia and Nardò, Ayine moved to Italian amateur club Ellera Calcio in January 2020. In June 2020, he joined Pirin Blagoevgrad.

== Honours ==
Thonon Evian

- Championnat National 3: 2021–22
