= Joseph Green (footballer) =

English footballer

Personal information
- Full name: Joseph James Green
- Date of birth: 29 October 1870
- Place of birth: Derby, England
- Date of death: 1940 (aged 69–70)
- Position: Goalkeeper

Senior career*
Years	Team	Apps	(Gls)
1892–1894	Derby Bedford Rangers		
1894–1895	Derby County	7	(0)
1895	Belper Town		
- * Club domestic league appearances and goals

Joseph James Green (29 October 1870 – 1940) was an English footballer who played in the Football League for Derby County.
