= Artur Krysiak =

Polish footballer

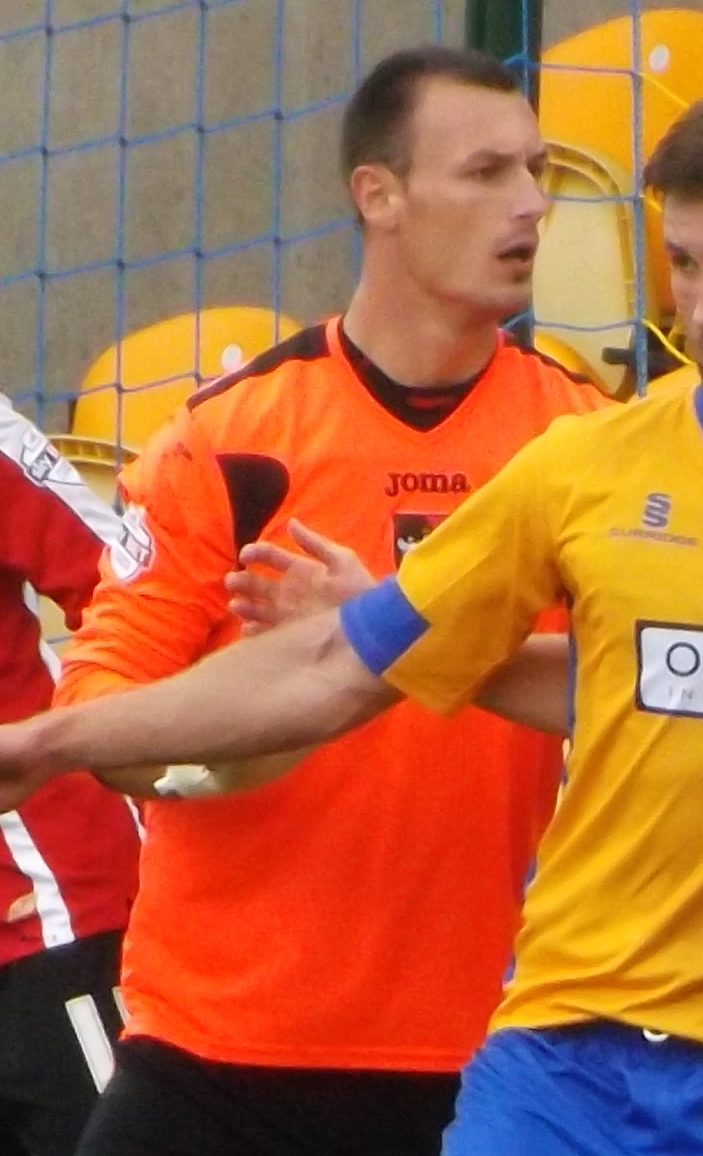
- Krysiak playing for Exeter City in 2013

Personal information
- Full name: Artur Łukasz Krysiak
- Date of birth: 11 August 1989 (age 37)
- Place of birth: Łódź, Poland
- Height: 6 ft 4 in (1.93 m)
- Position: Goalkeeper

Team information
- Current team: Boruta Zgierz
- Number: 1

Youth career
- 2004–2006: UKS SMS Łódź
- 2006–2008: Birmingham City

Senior career*
Years	Team	Apps	(Gls)
2008–2010	Birmingham City	0	(0)
2008	→ Gretna (loan)	4	(0)
2008	→ York City (loan)	2	(0)
2008	→ Swansea City (loan)	2	(0)
2009	→ Motherwell (loan)	1	(0)
2009–2010	→ Burton Albion (loan)	38	(0)
2010–2014	Exeter City	127	(0)
2014–2018	Yeovil Town	127	(0)
2018–2019	Bodø/Glimt	0	(0)
2019–2020	Odra Opole	16	(0)
2021	Jutrzenka Bychlew	0	(0)
2021–2024	Start Brzeziny	59	(0)
2024–	Boruta Zgierz	24	(0)

International career
2008	Poland U19		
- * Club domestic league appearances and goals as of 09:14, 23 June 2025 (UTC)

Artur Łukasz Krysiak (Polish pronunciation: [ˈartur ˈkrɨɕak]; born 11 August 1989) is a Polish professional footballer who plays as a goalkeeper for IV liga Łódź club Boruta Zgierz. He previously played in the Scottish Premier League for Gretna and Motherwell and in the Football League for Swansea City, Burton Albion, Exeter City and Yeovil Town. He also played for the Poland national under-19 team.

== Club career ==
Born in Łódź, Łódź Voivodeship, Krysiak trained at the academy of UKS SMS Łódź from 2004 until 31 August 2006 when he joined English Championship club Birmingham City on a three-year contract for a fee of £60,000. After only two hours on trial at Birmingham, goalkeeping coach Nigel Spink knew that "he was the real deal". Academy director Terry Westley described him as "a strong character [who] really stands out as a massive presence in goal" and believes that Krysiak can reach the top as "he has that Premiership mentality and quality".

He spent the second half of the 2007–08 season on loan at Scottish Premier League club Gretna. He made his debut on 16 February 2008 after Greg Fleming was suspended. Due to the good form of Fleming, Krysiak started in only three matches; on his third appearance he was named in Setanta Sports' SPL Team of the Week. He made one further appearance, impressing after coming on as a substitute against Hearts on 13 May 2008.

At the start of the 2008–09 season, Krysiak joined York City of the Conference Premier on loan for a month, as cover for injured goalkeeper Michael Ingham. He made his debut in a 1–0 victory against Crawley Town and was substituted during his second appearance against Wrexham after suffering a dislocated finger, which resulted in him returning to Birmingham.

After Birmingham's second-choice goalkeeper Colin Doyle underwent a knee operation, Krysiak replaced him on the substitutes' bench for the Championship match against Doncaster Rovers in September 2008. He joined fellow Championship team Swansea City on a three-month emergency loan on 23 September, and on the same day featured on the bench in a 1–0 victory over rivals Cardiff City in the League Cup. He made his debut for Swansea in a 3–0 win over Southampton in the Championship, in which he played the full 90 minutes. Krysiak was named in the Championship team of the week after making his debut for Swansea. He returned to Birmingham following the conclusion of this loan spell.

On 2 January 2009 Krysiak joined Scottish Premier League club Motherwell on loan for the remainder of the 2008–09 season. He made one appearance at Motherwell, which came on the final day of the season, in a 2–1 defeat to Kilmarnock.

In May 2009, Birmingham confirmed that Krysiak would be released when his contract expired at the end of the season. However, a few weeks later he signed a one-year contract with an option for a further year with the club.

On 10 August 2009 Krysiak joined Burton Albion, newly promoted to League Two, on loan for a month. He made his debut in a 5–2 victory over Morecambe on 15 August. After he produced "a string of impressive performances", the loan was first extended until 2 January 2010, and then for the rest of the season. In April, he injured his ankle, with recovery time expected to be from six to eight weeks.

In April 2010, Burton offered Krysiak a permanent contract, while Birmingham announced that he would be released when his contract expired at the end of June 2010.

Krysiak agreed to sign for League One club Exeter City when his Birmingham contract expired on 1 July. Krysiak made his Exeter league debut against Brighton in November 2010. On 7 May 2014, Krysiak announced on Exeweb (fans forum) that he would be leaving the club.

Krysiak joined newly relegated League One side Yeovil Town on a two-year contract on 30 June 2014. He was released by Yeovil at the end of the 2017–18 season.

On 9 August 2018, Krysiak signed for Norwegian Eliteserien side FK Bodø/Glimt on a contract until 2019.

On 22 January 2019, Krysiak returned to Poland to join I liga side Odra Opole signing a contract until 30 June 2019.

== International career ==
He played for the Poland national under-19 team in the 2008 European Championship elite qualification round.

== Career statistics ==
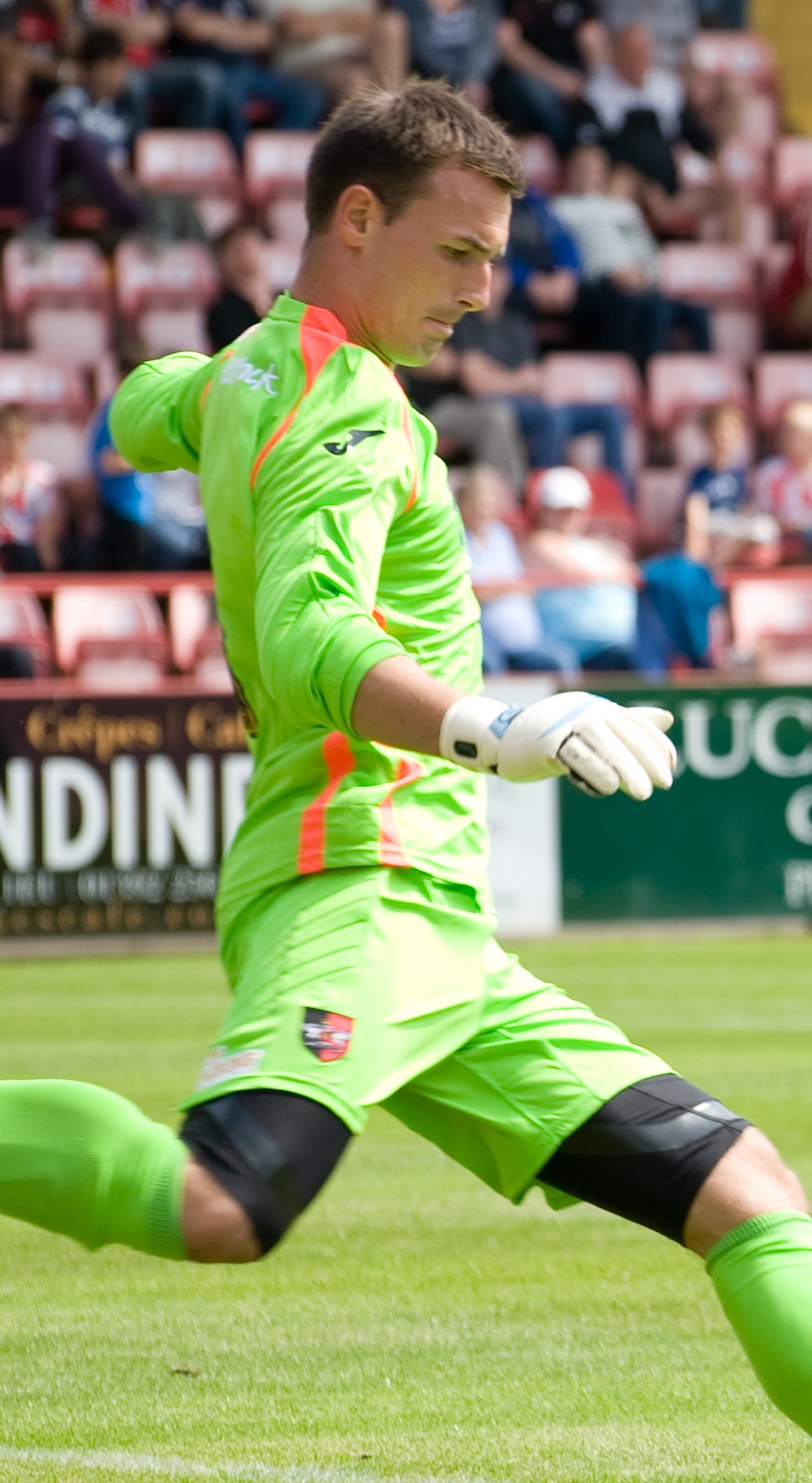
Krysiak playing for Exeter City in 2012

As of match played 14 June 2025

Appearances and goals by club, season and competition
Club	Season	League			National cup (Note: Includes FA Cup, Norwegian Cup and Polish Cup)		League cup (Note: Includes EFL Cup)		Other		Total	
Club	Season	Division	Apps	Goals	Apps	Goals	Apps	Goals	Apps	Goals	Apps	Goals
Birmingham City	2007–08	Premier League	0	0	0	0	0	0	—		0	0
Birmingham City	2008–09	Championship	0	0	—		0	0	—		0	0
Birmingham City	Total		0	0	0	0	0	0	—		0	0
Gretna (loan)	2007–08	Scottish Premier League	4	0	—		—		—		4	0
York City (loan)	2008–09	Conference Premier	2	0	—		—		—		2	0
Swansea City (loan)	2008–09	Championship	2	0	—		0	0	—		2	0
Motherwell (loan)	2008–09	Scottish Premier League	1	0	0	0	—		—		1	0
Burton Albion (loan)	2009–10	League Two	38	0	1	0	—		1 (Note: Appearance(s) in Football League Trophy)	0	40	0
Exeter City	2010–11	League One	10	0	1	0	0	0	3	0	14	0
Exeter City	2011–12	League One	38	0	1	0	2	0	1	0	42	0
Exeter City	2012–13	League Two	42	0	1	0	1	0	1	0	45	0
Exeter City	2013–14	League Two	37	0	1	0	1	0	1	0	40	0
Exeter City	Total		127	0	4	0	4	0	6	0	141	0
Yeovil Town	2014–15	League One	15	0	0	0	1	0	0	0	16	0
Yeovil Town	2015–16	League Two	38	0	3	0	1	0	2	0	44	0
Yeovil Town	2016–17	League Two	41	0	2	0	2	0	0	0	45	0
Yeovil Town	2017–18	League Two	33	0	5	0	1	0	6 (Note: Appearances in EFL Trophy)	0	45	0
Yeovil Town	Total		127	0	10	0	5	0	8	0	150	0
Bodø/Glimt	2018	Eliteserien	0	0	0	0	—		—		0	0
Odra Opole	2018–19	I liga	13	0	1	0	—		—		14	0
Odra Opole	2019–20	I liga	3	0	1	0	—		—		4	0
Odra Opole	Total		16	0	2	0	—		—		18	0
Jutrzenka Bychlew	2020–21	Klasa A Łódź III	0	0	—		—		—		0	0
Start Brzeziny	2021–22	Reg. league Skierniewice	7	0	—		—		—		7	0
Start Brzeziny	2022–23	Reg. league Skierniewice	19	0	—		—		—		19	0
Start Brzeziny	2023–24	IV liga Łódź	33	0	—		—		—		33	0
Start Brzeziny	Total		59	0	—		—		—		59	0
Boruta Zgierz	2024–25	Reg. league Łódź	24	0	—		—		—		24	0
Career total			400	0	17	0	9	0	15	0	441	0

== Honours ==
Start Brzeziny

- Regional league Skierniewice: 2022–23

Boruta Zgierz

- Regional league Łódź: 2024–25
