= Joe Green (footballer) =

English footballer

Personal information
- Date of birth: 16 December 1995 (age 30)
- Place of birth: Penistone, England
- Height: 6 ft 5 in (1.96 m)
- Position: Goalkeeper

Team information
- Current team: Guiseley

Youth career
- Sheffield United
- Sheffield

College career
| Years | Team | Apps | (Gls) |
| 2015 | Monroe Mustangs | 4 | (0) |

Senior career*
| Years | Team | Apps | (Gls) |
| 2015–2016 | Newport County | 0 | (0) |
| 2016–2017 | Handsworth Parramore | | |
| 2017 | Hemsworth Miners Welfare | 1 | (0) |
| 2017 | Scarborough Athletic | | |
| 2017–2020 | Guiseley | 63 | (0) |
| 2019 | → Gainsborough Trinity (loan) | 7 | (0) |
| 2020–2022 | Hyde United | 42 | (0) |
- * Club domestic league appearances and goals as of 00:46, 2 May 2022 (UTC)

Joe Green (born 16 December 1995) is an English professional football goalkeeper who plays for Northern Premier League club Ossett United.

== Early life ==
As a teenager, Green attended Penistone Grammar School near Barnsley.

== Career ==
=== Youth ===
After being released by Sheffield United as a youth player, Green had unsuccessful trials with Scunthorpe United and Doncaster Rovers. Having failed to secure a professional deal in England, in 2015, Green moved to the US to join the college football programme at Monroe College in New York City, cancelling his place on a bricklaying apprenticeship with Bellway Homes after two weeks. He played four times for the college team, the Monroe Mustangs, before returning to England after becoming unsatisfied with the standard of the football.

=== Newport County ===
On his return to England, Green had trials with Barnsley and Chesterfield but was not offered a deal at either club. Following his trial at the club, Chesterfield goalkeeping coach Mark Crossley recommended Green to his former coach John Sheridan and, in November 2015, Green signed for Sheridan at League Two club Newport County as cover for Joe Day following Rhys Taylor's loan move to Wrexham. He made his senior debut for Newport in the FA Cup third round match versus Blackburn Rovers on 18 January 2016 as a second-half substitute. Blackburn won the game 2–1. He was released by Newport on 10 May 2016 at the end of his contract.

=== Non-league ===
Following his release, Green spent time on trial at Harrogate Town before joining Northern Counties East Football League side Handsworth Parramore. In February 2017, he moved to Hemsworth Miners Welfare, but spent just two weeks at the club, making one appearance during a 3–0 defeat to Cleethorpes Town, before joining Scarborough Athletic, keeping 8 clean sheets in a row to help the side achieve a play-off finish.

In June 2017, Green joined National League side Guiseley to compete with Jonny Maxted. Green joined Northern Premier League club Gainsborough Trinity on loan on 8 March 2019 for the remainder of the 2018–19 season,

== Career statistics ==
As of match played 18 February 2016.

Appearances and goals by club, season and competition
| Club | Season | League | | | FA Cup | | League Cup | | Other | | Total | |
| Club | Season | Division | Apps | Goals | Apps | Goals | Apps | Goals | Apps | Goals | Apps | Goals |
|---|---|---|---|---|---|---|---|---|---|---|---|---|
| Newport County | 2015–16 | League Two | 0 | 0 | 1 | 0 | 0 | 0 | 0 | 0 | 1 | 0 |
| Career total | | | 0 | 0 | 0 | 0 | 0 | 0 | 0 | 0 | 1 | 0 |
