= Dominic Blizzard =

English footballer (born 1983)

Personal information
- Full name: Dominic John Blizzard
- Date of birth: 2 September 1983 (age 43)
- Place of birth: High Wycombe, England
- Height: 6 ft 2 1/2 in (1.89 m)
- Position: Midfielder

Youth career
- 1998–2002: Watford

Senior career*
Years	Team	Apps	(Gls)
2002–2007	Watford	29	(2)
2007	→ Stockport County (loan)	7	(0)
2007	→ Milton Keynes Dons (loan)	8	(0)
2007	Milton Keynes Dons	0	(0)
2007–2009	Stockport County	58	(4)
2009–2011	Bristol Rovers	39	(1)
2011	→ Port Vale (loan)	1	(0)
2011–2013	Yeovil Town	54	(4)
2013–2015	Plymouth Argyle	57	(2)
Total		253	(13)
- * Club domestic league appearances and goals

Dominic John Blizzard (born 2 September 1983) is an English actor and former professional footballer who played as a midfielder.

He worked his way through the Watford youth side and turned professional at the club in 2002. In 2007, he joined Stockport County and then Milton Keynes Dons on loan, before signing with the Dons permanently later in the year. He left the Dons after just a few months and then signed with Stockport. In 2009, he transferred to Bristol Rovers, before leaving the club following a brief period on loan at Port Vale in 2011. He signed with Yeovil Town in July 2011, who were promoted out of League One via the play-offs in May 2013. He switched to Plymouth Argyle for two years in June 2013. He turned to acting in 2015.

== Football career ==
=== Watford ===
Blizzard started his career with Watford, signing his first professional contract in April 2002. He made his debut for the club against Norwich City on 24 April 2004 at Vicarage Road, scoring the consolation goal in a 2–1 defeat. This was enough to win him a new contract at the end of the season. After making some appearances in 2004–05, he signed a new deal in February 2005 that would keep him at the club until summer 2007. The following month he became a first-team regular when Aidy Boothroyd replaced Ray Lewington as manager.

He started the 2005–06 season in the first-team but contracted the Epstein–Barr virus in late September and did not play a first-team game for Watford again. He returned to the bench for a single game, on 14 April 2006, wearing a goalkeeper's kit. With second-choice goalkeeper Alec Chamberlain out ill, the semi-fit Blizzard took the substitute goalkeeper spot, having played the position as a child. Having made just one first-team appearance in 2006–07, Blizzard spent the second half of the season on loan at Stockport County and Milton Keynes Dons. He played in both of the "Dons" play-off games, which saw them lose 2–1 on aggregate to Shrewsbury Town.

=== Milton Keynes Dons and Stockport County ===
In May 2007, he signed a two-year deal with the MK Dons. However, on 8 August it was announced that Blizzard had left the Dons by mutual consent, after new boss Paul Ince was unimpressed with his pre-season performances. Two days later, Stockport confirmed Blizzard would be re-joining the club as a free agent. He helped County into the play-offs during his first season at Edgeley Park but missed the final itself due to a hamstring injury.

=== Bristol Rovers ===
Despite there being reported interest from Championship clubs, Blizzard joined League One club Bristol Rovers on a free transfer in July 2009, having agreed the deal over a week earlier. He signed a three-year deal. Despite missing most of the pre-season due to suffering from influenza, he made his debut as a substitute in a 2–1 defeat to Leyton Orient on 8 August 2009. On 15 February 2010, he made a challenge on Charlton Athletic's Grant Basey that "Addicks" boss Phil Parkinson described as "one of the worst I've seen". Though at first there were concerns that he had broken Basey's leg, the resulting injury turned out to be ankle ligament damage. This came ten days after Blizzard had told the media that he was frustrated with being left on the bench. He was a regular starter for the rest of the season. On 27 February 2010, he scored his first and only goal for Bristol Rovers against Colchester United.

During the 2010–11 season, Blizzard lost his starting place in the "Pirates" first XI as a new signing Wayne Brown came in and took his place. He gained his first start of the season in September, after Brown was ruled out with an ankle problem. Two months later, manager Paul Trollope announced his intention to try to find a club for Blizzard to join on loan. In March 2011, he joined Port Vale on loan until the end of the season; this reunited him with Jim Gannon, his former boss at Stockport. His spell would last a matter of days however. Arriving on the 18th, he played in the 3–0 defeat to Accrington Stanley on the 19th, and returned to Rovers on the 21st after Gannon was sacked. He departed parent club Rovers by mutual consent in June 2011.

=== Yeovil Town ===
In July 2011, Blizzard joined Yeovil Town on a one-year contract. He scored his first goal for the club in the FA Cup, hitting a 20 yards (18 m) drive in a 3–0 win away to Hereford United. Seven days later, on 19 November, he scored in the 2–2 draw with nearby rivals Exeter City at Huish Park. After returning from a lengthy spell on the sidelines with injury, he scored in a 3–2 defeat at Carlisle United on 25 February. His next goal was in a 3–2 win at home to Chesterfield on 28 April. On 15 May, Blizzard was reported to be one of four players set to leave the club after rejecting manager Gary Johnson's offer of a new contract. However, two days later it was announced that he had signed a new one-year deal with the club. Blizzard told BBC Somerset: "I've signed and there was never a point that I wasn't going to sign. I'm happy with the whole environment. That's why I'm willing to sign again."

He made 30 appearances in the 2012–13 campaign, though did not feature in the play-off final victory over Brentford which took the "Glovers" into the Championship. Blizzard was released by Yeovil at the end of the season along with Richard Hinds and Gavin Williams.

=== Plymouth Argyle ===
On 25 June 2013, Dominic agreed to sign a two-year deal with League Two club Plymouth Argyle. He scored his first goal for the club with an "impressive strike from long range" against Southend United in a 1–1 draw at Home Park on 11 January 2014. In total, he made 31 appearances for the "Pilgrims" in the 2013–14 campaign as Plymouth posted a tenth-place finish.

He made 31 league appearances in the 2014–15 season, scoring one goal in a 1–0 win over Luton Town at Kenilworth Road on 6 September. Argyle reached the play-offs, losing to Wycombe Wanderers at the semi-final stage. Blizzard was released by manager John Sheridan in May 2015. Blizzard has indicated that Sheridan's decision to release him was "a bit personal" but stated that he enjoyed his time as a Plymouth Argyle player.

== Style of play ==
Blizzard could play anywhere across the midfield, though preferring a central role, he could also play as an attacking or defensive midfielder. He had been described as a skilled passing footballer.

== Acting career ==
Blizzard turned to acting in 2015. Trained at the Actors Studio at Pinewood Studios, he also worked as a part-time scriptwriter. In 2019, he revealed that he had been writing a script based on his own football career.

== Career statistics ==
Appearances and goals by club, season and competition
Club	Season	League			FA Cup		League Cup		Other		Total	
Club	Season	Division	Apps	Goals	Apps	Goals	Apps	Goals	Apps	Goals	Apps	Goals
Watford	2003–04	First Division	2	1	0	0	0	0	—		2	1
Watford	2004–05	Championship	17	1	1	0	0	0	—		18	1
Watford	2005–06	Championship	10	0	0	0	1	1	0	0	11	1
Watford	2006–07	Premier League	0	0	0	0	1	0	—		1	0
Watford	Total		29	2	1	0	2	1	0	0	32	3
Milton Keynes Dons (loan)	2006–07	League Two	8	0	—		—		2 (Note: Appearances in League Two play-offs)	0	10	0
Milton Keynes Dons	2007–08	League Two	0	0	0	0	0	0	0	0	0	0
Milton Keynes Dons	Total		8	0	0	0	0	0	2	0	10	0
Stockport County (loan)	2006–07	League Two	7	0	—		—		—		7	0
Stockport County	2007–08	League Two	27	1	0	0	2	1	1	0	30	2
Stockport County	2008–09	League One	31	3	1	0	1	0	0	0	33	3
Stockport County	Total		65	4	1	0	3	1	1	0	70	5
Bristol Rovers	2009–10	League One	34	1	1	0	2	0	1 (Note: Appearances in Football League Trophy)	0	38	1
Bristol Rovers	2010–11	League One	5	0	0	0	1	0	1	0	7	0
Bristol Rovers	Total		39	1	1	0	3	0	2	0	45	1
Port Vale (loan)	2010–11	League Two	1	0	—		—		—		1	0
Yeovil Town	2011–12	League One	30	3	2	1	0	0	0	0	32	4
Yeovil Town	2012–13	League One	24	1	1	0	2	0	3	0	30	1
Yeovil Town	Total		54	4	3	1	2	0	3	0	62	5
Plymouth Argyle	2013–14	League Two	26	1	4	0	1	0	0	0	31	1
Plymouth Argyle	2014–15	League Two	31	1	1	0	0	0	2 (Note: One appearance in Football League Trophy; one appearance in League Two play-offs)	0	34	1
Plymouth Argyle	Total		57	2	5	0	1	0	2	0	65	2
Career total			253	13	11	1	11	2	10	0	285	16

== Honours ==
Stockport County

- Football League Two play-offs: 2008

Yeovil Town

- Football League One play-offs: 2013
