= 2012–13 Yeovil Town F.C. season =

Yeovil Town
2012–13 season
- Chairman: John Fry
- Manager: Gary Johnson
- Stadium: Huish Park
- League One: 4th
- Play-offs: Winners (promoted)
- FA Cup: First round
- League Cup: Second round
- FL Trophy: Southern Semi-finals
- Top goalscorer: League: Paddy Madden (22); All: Paddy Madden (23)
- Highest home attendance: 8,152 (6 May vs. Sheffield United, Play-off semi-final)
- Lowest home attendance: 1,771 (4 December vs. Wycombe Wanderers, FL Trophy)
- Average home league attendance: 4,072
Home colours	Away colours

The 2012–13 season was the 10th season in the Football League and the 8th consecutive season at the third tier of English football played by Yeovil Town Football Club, an English football club based in Yeovil, Somerset.

Manager Gary Johnson signed nine players before the close of the summer transfer window. The season started promisingly with the club briefly topping the Football League One table in August before a 6-match losing run in September and October saw them drop in to mid-table. Having stood 12th in the league table after Boxing Day, Yeovil went on an 8-match run winning run which transformed them into promotion candidates. The signing of Paddy Madden permanently in January saw Yeovil win 11 of their final 20 games, and the team finished the season 4th in the table, a new record high finishing position, and qualified for the play-offs. Where they faced Sheffield United in the semi-final, a 1–0 away defeat in the first leg before a late Ed Upson goal gave Yeovil a 2–0 victory in the home leg. Brentford faced Yeovil in the 2013 Football League One play-off final at Wembley Stadium, Yeovil won 2–1 courtesy of goals from Madden and Dan Burn and were promoted to the second-tier of English football for the first time in the club's history.

Yeovil's first fixture of the season came in the League Cup first round, beating Colchester United before being defeated by Premier League side West Bromwich Albion in the second round. They were knocked out of the FA Cup by Preston North End in the first round and reached the Southern Area semi-finals of the Football League Trophy before being beaten by Leyton Orient. Paddy Madden was the club's and League One top scorer with 23 goals, with all but one of these coming in the league.

== Background ==
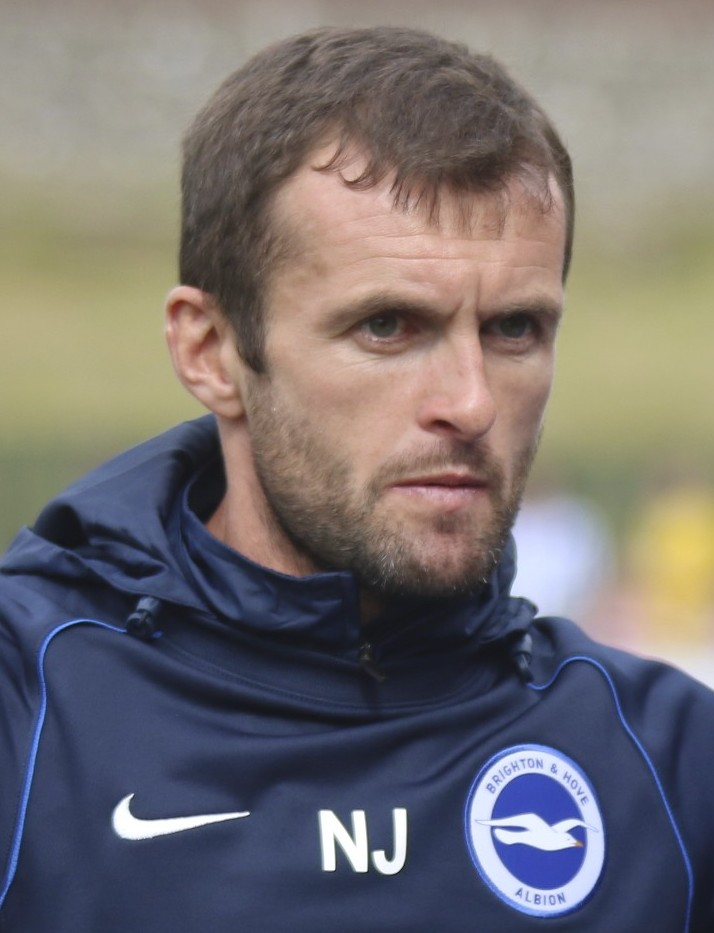
Player-coach Nathan Jones departed after seven years with the club.

The 2011–12 season was the club's seventh consecutive in the third tier of the English football league system, it was Terry Skiverton's third full season in charge as manager. Yeovil started the season slowly winning only two of their first ten matches and picking up only 8 points, the sluggish form continued and by the middle of October they had slipped to the foot of the table with just 11 points from 15 matches. Two consecutive victories over Hartlepool United and Notts County were followed with the embarrassment of their FA Cup second round home replay defeat against Conference National side Fleetwood Town. With two defeats over Christmas and a draw against relegation rivals Exeter City in early January, Yeovil were still in the bottom four having picked up 21 points from 24 matches. On 9 January 2012, the club announced the return of Gary Johnson as manager and the demotion of Skiverton to the role of assistant manager. Johnson transformed Yeovil's form as they picked up 25 points from a possible 36 and the club briefly entered the top half of the table in March, with a brief blip in form in April when the club suffered their record Football League defeat 0–6 at home to Stevenage but the club secured their League One status with two matches to spare and finished the season in 17th position with 54 points from 46 matches.

The end of the season featured another large turnover of players with eight being released, these included defenders Kelly Youga and Alistair Slowe, midfielder Billy Gibson, forwards Kieran Agard and Steve MacLean who were all released and the three first-year professionals Rhys Baggridge, Lewis Clarke and Rob Clowes were released without making a first team appearance. Seven players were offered new contracts and two contracts were also offered to Middlesbrough loanees Jonathan Grounds and Jonathan Franks. Vice-captain Luke Ayling and midfielder Ed Upson agreed to new two years contracts whereas Dominic Blizzard, Richard Hinds and Gavin Williams all agreed new one-year deals. But top scorer Andy Williams and captain Paul Huntington both rejected offers of new contracts, joining Swindon Town and Preston North End respectively. Middlesbrough duo Grounds and Franks also both rejected Yeovil's approaches. Player-coach Nathan Jones left the club after seven years and 211 matches, three years of which were spent as assistant manager to Terry Skiverton, to take up a role at Charlton Athletic as their Under-21 Professional Development Coach.

== Review ==
=== Pre-season ===
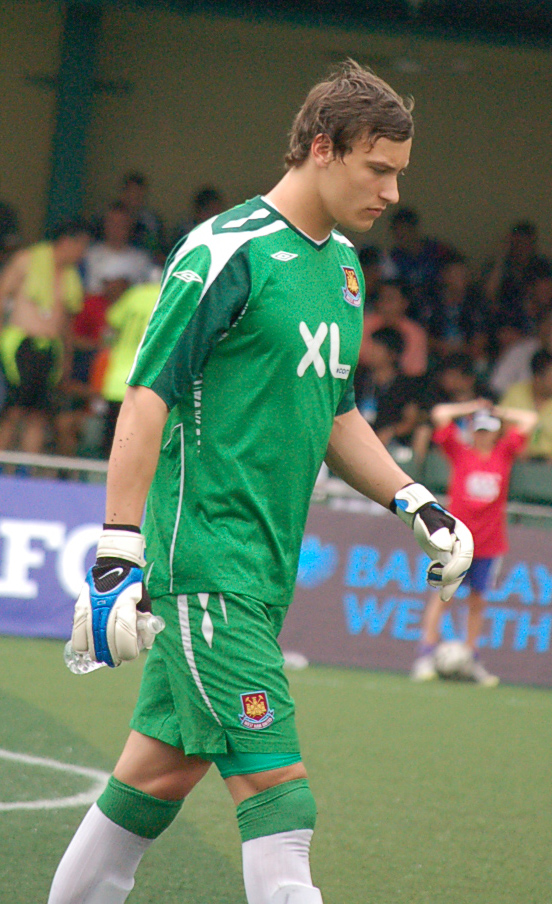
Czech under-21 Marek Štěch signed from West Ham United following a loan spell last season.

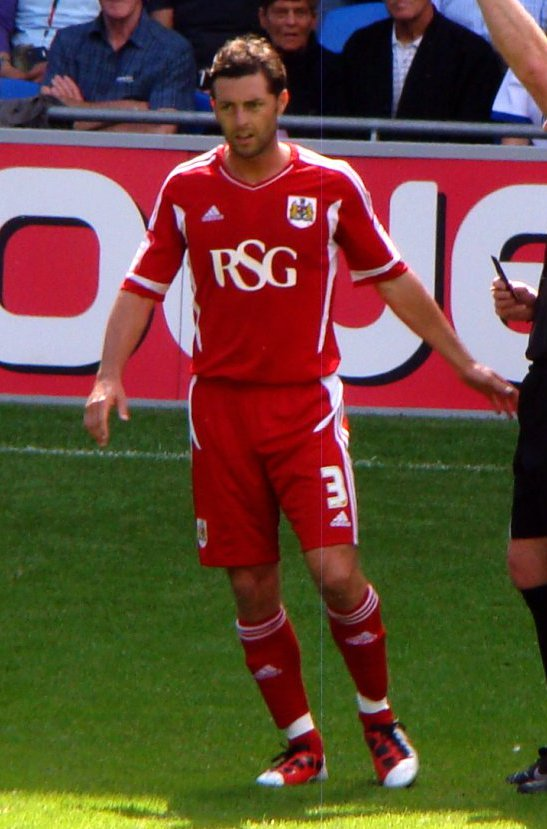
Jamie McAllister, who signed in the summer, was given the captaincy.

The squad returned for pre-season training on 2 July. The squad was joined by five players who were signed during the off season, former Bristol City and Scotland international full-back Jamie McAllister, released Oldham Athletic duo Keanu Marsh-Brown and Reuben Reid, former Doncaster Rovers forward James Hayter and attacking midfielder Sam Foley after he rejected a new contract with Conference side Newport County. Midfielder Michael Woods was invited back for pre-season training after a non-contract spell at the end of last season, but did not return and Oxford City full-back James Clarke was also invited for a pre-season trial. The first day of pre-season saw the signing of versatile left sided player Nathan Ralph following his release from Peterborough United and former Northampton Town winger Lewis Young. These two new players were supplemented by trialists including Clarke, Canadian goalkeeper Lucas Birnstingl, former Kilmarnock midfielder Ross Lindsay and former Southampton trainee Aarran Racine. On 4 July 2012, despite being half way through his two-year contract defender Bondz N'Gala left the club for fellow League One side Stevenage. Central defender Byron Webster, who had been released by Northampton Town earlier in the day, was signed on a two-year contract and the following day the club sign former loan goalkeeper Marek Štěch on a two-year contract. On 13 July 2012, Chelsea youngster Rohan Ince signed on a six-month loan deal.

Yeovil faced rivals Hereford United at Edgar Street on 14 July, included in the team were three more trialists; former Swansea City youngsters Casey Thomas and Joe Walsh, and Salif Cissé, the brother of former Bristol City midfielder Kalifa. The game ended in a 1–1 draw with Ed Upson scoring for Yeovil. The subsequent friendly away against Southern League side Poole Town saw a cull of trialists with only Cissé and Racine remaining in the side, although Clarke's absence was due to injury, they were joined by former Chesterfield defender Aaron Downes. The game ended in a 2–0 for Yeovil thanks to a brace from Marsh–Brown. On 19 July, young forward Gozie Ugwu arrived on a six-month loan from Reading making him Yeovil's eleventh signing of the summer. The same day the club confirmed that Racine and Cissé's trials had been terminated, the club also revealed that previous shirt sponsors Jones Building Contractors had chosen not to take up the option to extend their deal and so the club were in negotiations with businesses to become the club's main sponsor for the 2012–13 season. Midfielder Dominic Blizzard missed the first six pre-season friendlies having suffered a broken hand in training. On 21 July, Yeovil faced League Two side Plymouth Argyle at the home of Dorchester Town The Avenue Stadium due to problems with the Huish Park pitch, Yeovil strolled to a 5–0 win with a hat-trick from Reuben Reid and goals from Hayter and Marsh-Brown. On 24 July, trialist Aaron Downes signed for League Two side Torquay United. The same day Yeovil faced Dorchester Town in an away friendly and beat the Conference South side 3–0 with a brace from Reading loanee Gozie Ugwu and a goal from Lewis Young. The following day long term transfer-listed midfielder Anthony Edgar left the club for League Two side Barnet. Yeovil did suffer their first defeat of pre–season on 26 July but in a Twenty20 cricket match against North Perrott Cricket Club losing the contest heavily by 71 runs. The following day Yeovil played their first home friendly against Bristol Rovers and despite taking the lead through Rohan Ince the game ended in a 1–1 draw.

The club then embarked on a brief pre–season tour to southern Wales commencing with a friendly against Welsh Premier League side Llanelli on 31 July. Trialist James Clarke returned to the club after injury and in a high scoring encounter Yeovil triumphed 5–3 courtesy of a brace from James Hayter, and goals from Ince, Sam Foley and Gozie Ugwu. Later in the week the side embarked on a team–building white water rafting exercise, before their second friendly against Conference side Newport County. The match allowed a return to Newport for Sam Foley, as Yeovil's good pre–season form continued with a 3–1 victory courtesy of goals from Reid, Nathan Ralph and Gozie Ugwu. Following the match, Johnson announced the departure of final trialist James Clarke after failing to earn a contract. Following the lack of interest in a new shirt sponsorship deal, the players were convinced by manager Gary Johnson to take part in a topless photo call to fuel interest. On 7 August, Yeovil faced their only pre–season match against higher league opposition in the shape of Premier League side Stoke City. Yeovil took the lead through a Reuben Reid penalty with Stoke equalising through a Kenwyne Jones header nine minutes later and the match finished 1–1. With national press coverage for the squad photo publicity stunt, on 10 August, the club announced a deal had been agreed with W+S Recycling to be the club's new shirt sponsor, and on the same day it was announced that local Italian restaurant chain Tamburino's had agreed a deal to have their logo on the rear of Yeovil's shirts. Yeovil completed their pre–season preparation the following day with a 2–2 draw against Exeter City with goals from Upson and Reid, pre–season finished with an unbeaten record in all nine matches with five victories and four draws, scoring 23 goals and conceding just nine.

Pre-season match details
Date	Opponents	Venue	Result	Score F–A	Scorers	Attendance	Ref
14 July 2012	Hereford United	A	D	1–1	Upson		
17 July 2012	Poole Town	A	W	2–0	Marsh Brown (2)	421	
21 July 2012	Plymouth Argyle	A	W	5–0	Reid (3), Marsh Brown, Hayter		
24 July 2012	Dorchester Town	A	W	3–0	Ugwu (2), Young		
28 July 2012	Bristol Rovers	H	D	1–1	Ince	1,125	
31 July 2012	Llanelli	A	W	5–3	Ince, Foley, Hayter (2), Ugwu	137	
3 August 2012	Newport County	A	W	3–1	Reid, Ralph, Ugwu	729	
7 August 2012	Stoke City	H	D	1–1	Reid	2,106	
11 August 2012	Exeter City	H	D	2–2	Upson, Reid	817	

=== August ===
Yeovil's season began with a Football League Cup first round home tie against Colchester United on 14 August. A first half brace from centre back Richard Hinds and a debut goal from winger Keanu Marsh-Brown helped Yeovil to a comfortable 3–0 victory over their League One rivals. The draw for the second round of the League Cup took place the following day and presented Yeovil with a home tie against Premier League side West Bromwich Albion. Prior to the first match of the league season, on 18 August, the Football League Trophy draw took place on Soccer AM with Yeovil drawn away against Bristol Rovers in the first round of the competition. Later in the day, in Yeovil's opening league match against Coventry City the club fell behind early from a Cody McDonald header, before Richard Hinds scored his third goal in a week as the game ended in a 1–1 draw. The following Tuesday, Yeovil's first away game saw a trip to Brentford in an eventful game Yeovil ran out 3–1 victors thanks to a brace from James Hayter and a penalty save from Marek Štěch. Hinds's goal scoring form and impressive performances earned him a place in the League One Team of the Week. On 23 August, Chelsea youngster Archange Nkumu joined the club on a one-month loan deal as cover for injured fellow Chelsea loanee Rohan Ince, and Curtis Haynes-Brown left the club to join League Two side AFC Wimbledon on a one-month loan deal. Yeovil's next away trip saw a match against bottom of the League side Scunthorpe United and courtesy of a first half goal from Keanu Marsh-Brown and second half goals from Reuben Reid and a brace from Gozie Ugwu gave Yeovil a 4–0 away victory. The result sent Yeovil to the top of League One for the first time in their history, the result saw four players receive recognition from the Football League Team of the Week goalkeeper Marek Štěch was joined by full backs Luke Ayling and Jamie McAllister along with midfielder Ed Upson. On 28 August in the League Cup second round tie against West Brom despite an impressive performance and a brace from forward Reuben Reid, the match saw Yeovil eventually overpowered to lose 4–2. Yeovil's performances in the month of August led to the nomination of Gary Johnson for Manager of the Month and defender Richard Hinds for Player of the Month, both though lost out to Ronnie Moore and Andy Robinson, both of Tranmere Rovers, respectively.

=== September ===
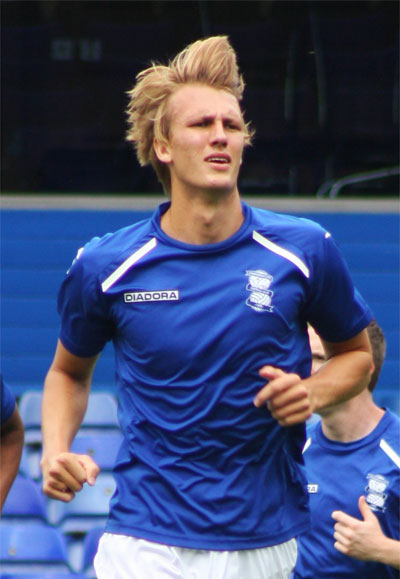
Fulham defender Dan Burn joined the club on loan for the season.

Despite a 2–1 over Doncaster Rovers, courtesy of goals from Hayter and Ugwu, Yeovil dropped to second in the league table on goal difference. The performance of centre back Richard Hinds saw him named in the Football League One Team of the Week for the second time in three weeks. The Football League Trophy match against Bristol Rovers saw a sluggish performance from Yeovil but despite a red card for captain Jamie McAllister, for an off the ball incident with former team-mate David Clarkson, Yeovil won 3–0 with two goals from free-kicks from Ed Upson and a first goal for Sam Foley proving the difference. The club also received a team performance of the round award for their victory over Bristol Rovers. On 8 September, on Soccer AM, Yeovil were drawn away against Torquay United in the second round of the Football League Trophy, later in the day saw a tired performance in the club's first league defeat 1–0 at home against Bournemouth. On 15 September, Norwich City midfielder Korey Smith joined Yeovil on an emergency loan deal for the maximum period of 93 days, he made his debut as a substitute that afternoon in the 1–0 away defeat against MK Dons as Yeovil slipped to a second consecutive defeat. The following Tuesday saw Yeovil travel to play Leyton Orient and with a frail defensive display Yeovil suffered a heavy 4–1 defeat, with the only positive a first league goal for Sam Foley and slipped to 11th in the table. On 21 September, versatile full–back Joe Edwards, who had a loan spell with the club last season, resigned from Bristol City on loan. Yeovil's dismal form continued with another home defeat this time a 1–0 reverse against Sheffield United, on 22 September. On 25 September, Rohan Ince returned to Chelsea following an unsuccessful loan spell, but signed 6 ft 6in defender Dan Burn from Fulham on a youth loan deal for an initial month . Despite taking a sixth minute lead through a Gavin Williams penalty against Preston North End more poor defending and the sending off of midfielder Ed Upson led to a second half turnaround and a 3–2 defeat, with debutante Dan Burn scoring at both ends. This defeat saw Yeovil finish the month of September setting a new unwanted club record in the Football League for most consecutive defeats.

=== October ===
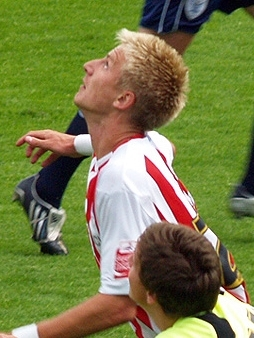
Having failed to score in English football for seven years Byron Webster scored twice in a week.

Yeovil's dismal run of form continued into October, and despite a Reuben Reid penalty the club suffered a 2–1 home defeat against Portsmouth, their sixth consecutive defeat as the club slid to 16th in the League One table. The game proved more costly for Yeovil than merely a defeat with injuries to both Lewis Young, ankle ligament damage and Gozie Ugwu, recurrence of a hamstring injury, ruling them both out for the month of October, in an attempt to arrest this run of form and as cover for those injuries, on 4 October, Gary Johnson completed the loan signing of Republic of Ireland U21 striker Paddy Madden from Carlisle United. The move worked with immediate effect with Madden scoring a brace on his debut and Hayter adding a third in a 3–1 victory over Colchester United. The poor run of form though was reflected by the Colchester United match being the club's lowest ever Football League attendance of just 3,002. This improved performance led to a double nomination in the Football League's Team of the Week with Irish duo Madden and winger Sam Foley both represented. On 9 October, Yeovil's away Football League Trophy tie against Torquay United was postponed due to a waterlogged pitch at Plainmoor, with the match rescheduled for the following week on the following Saturday the winner of the tie was given the reward of a home Area Quarter-final tie against Wycombe Wanderers in the next round. Another encouraging performance away at league leaders Tranmere Rovers saw Yeovil take a 2–0 lead after half an hour thanks to goals from Madden and Foley, but another second half collapse saw Tranmere comeback to win the game 3–2 with Yeovil's plight not aided by having Joe Edwards sent off for two yellow cards. In their rearranged tie on 16 October, Yeovil salvaged a 2–2 draw against Torquay United with a stoppage time equaliser from James Hayter, to add to his earlier goal, with Yeovil winning the tie 5–4 on penalties, having scored all five of their spot kicks and keeper Marek Štěch having saved Torquay's Thomas Cruise's effort. The victory confirming Yeovil's progress to the Area Quarter-final stage of the Football League Trophy, for the first time in five years, with a home tie against Wycombe Wanderers. An unconvincing 2–1 victory over a ten-man Bury followed courtesy of goals from Byron Webster and Foley, the performance of midfielder Korey Smith earned him recognition in the League One Team of the Week. That weekend in the draw for the FA Cup First Round Proper Yeovil were given an away tie against fellow League One side Preston North End, to be played on 3 November. On 23 October, with injuries continuing to hamper the squad young Jamaican-born midfielder Daniel Johnson joined the club on a month-long youth loan deal from Aston Villa. That evening Yeovil strolled to a 3–1 victory over Shrewsbury Town courtesy of a brace from Paddy Madden and a goal from top scorer Hayter who took his tally for the season to seven, Daniel Johnson made his debut as a second-half substitute but had the ignominy of giving away a penalty. Yeovil ended the month with a third consecutive victory this time a 1–0 away win against Crewe Alexandra thanks to a second goal in a week for defender Byron Webster, the result was also only Yeovil's second clean sheet in the League that season. After a two-month loan spell at AFC Wimbledon, defender Curtis Haynes-Brown returned to the club having made six appearances for the Dons. Webster's winning goal and the club's second league clean sheet of the season led to his inclusion in the Football League's Team of the Week.

=== November ===
On 1 November, after lengthy negotiations with Carlisle United the club agreed to extend the loan of striker Paddy Madden until January, the Irish forward having scored five goals in his five appearances in the first month of his loan deal. Gary Johnson also did not rule out a permanent deal for the Carlisle striker suggesting it was part of the discussions to extend his loan deal. On 3 November, Yeovil's FA Cup ended with a first round away defeat at Preston North End. The 3–0 lacklustre defeat was not helped by the sending off of Ed Upson, who coincidentally was sent off in the corresponding league fixture in September. Yeovil's three game winning run in the league came to an abrupt end with a 3–1 home defeat against high flying Stevenage despite a further goal by inform loan striker Paddy Madden early in the first half. The club though got back to winning ways the following on 10 November, courtesy of a goal from Bristol City loanee Joe Edwards after seven minutes to give the side a 1–0 win over bottom of the league side Hartlepool United. The same day youth team goalkeeper Matt Cafer joined Sherborne Town on a work-experience loan deal. Luke Ayling's performance in the victory over Hartlepool United led to his inclusion in the Football League Team of the Week. Yeovil's inconsistent form continued throughout November with a 4–1 defeat at the hands of Swindon Town, including a goal from former striker Andy Williams, followed, on 20 November, by an impressive 1–0 away win against Cralwey Town. The conclusion of the loan transfer window saw Yeovil extend the loan of defender Dan Burn until January, and bring in Watford defender Dale Bennett on loan also until the new year. Meanwhile Daniel Johnson returned to Aston Villa, and defender Curtis Haynes-Brown was sent out on loan again this time to Conference National side Cambridge United, it was also announced the club had taken former Canadian international winger Jaime Peters on trial. The team ended the month in 12th place following a 3–1 home defeat at the hands of Carlisle United.

=== December ===
Yeovil began the month with a home Football League Trophy tie against Football League Two side Wycombe Wanderers, courtesy of first-half goals from midfielders Ed Upson and Sam Foley Yeovil recorded a comfortable 2–0 victory. The victory meant that Yeovil had qualified for the Southern Area Semi-finals the furthest they had ever reached in the competition, in the draw for this match on 8 December Yeovil were drawn away against League One rivals Leyton Orient. The same day Yeovil faced Notts County at home and despite multiple chances and saves forced from visiting keeper Bartosz Białkowski were forced to be content with a 0–0 draw. Manager Gary Johnson announced after the match that Watford defender Dale Bennett had returned to his parent club a month early after just one substitute appearance due to a back injury. On 15 December, Yeovil faced an away game against Walsall and recovered from 2–0 down to draw thanks to a goal from substitute Reuben Reid and a last minute equaliser from Sam Foley. For the Football League Trophy tie with Leyton Orient in January the club offer fans free transport to the match in an attempt to get 500 away travelling supporters, with these coaches funded by the chairman John Fry, joint owner Norman Hayward, directors, vice-presidents, manager Gary Johnson and the playing squad. On 22 December, despite conceding the opening goal in only the third minute against Oldham Athletic the team turned the game around thanks to two goals from Gavin Williams, the second a superb 30-yard strike, and two late goals from Hayter and Madden seeing Yeovil to a 4–1 victory their largest home victory of the season. Yeovil's Boxing Day fixture saw them face a short trip to Bournemouth without Foley with a hamstring injury and Korey Smith and Joe Edwards both of whom had returned to their parent clubs due to their loan spells having been completed, a stretched squad suffered a 3–0 reverse. Following the game Johnson confirmed that the January transfer window would see an overhaul of the squad with the hope of helping Yeovil move up the table in the second half of the season, Johnson confirmed two of these signing would be likely to be the permanent acquisition of Paddy Madden and the signing of Irish trialist Kevin Dawson. On 29 December, Yeovil visited Fratton Park for the first time in their history to take on Portsmouth the Glovers won the game 2–1 thanks to two first half goals from set-pieces ending the calendar year in 12th place in the League One table with 36 points from 25 matches played. Present at the game were two trialists captain of Middlesbrough under–21 side's Matthew Dolan and former Chelsea trainee Aliu Djaló with a view to them signing on loan and permanently respectively in the January transfer window. Defender Byron Webster received recognition for his goal and impressive performance in the League One Team of the Week.

=== January ===
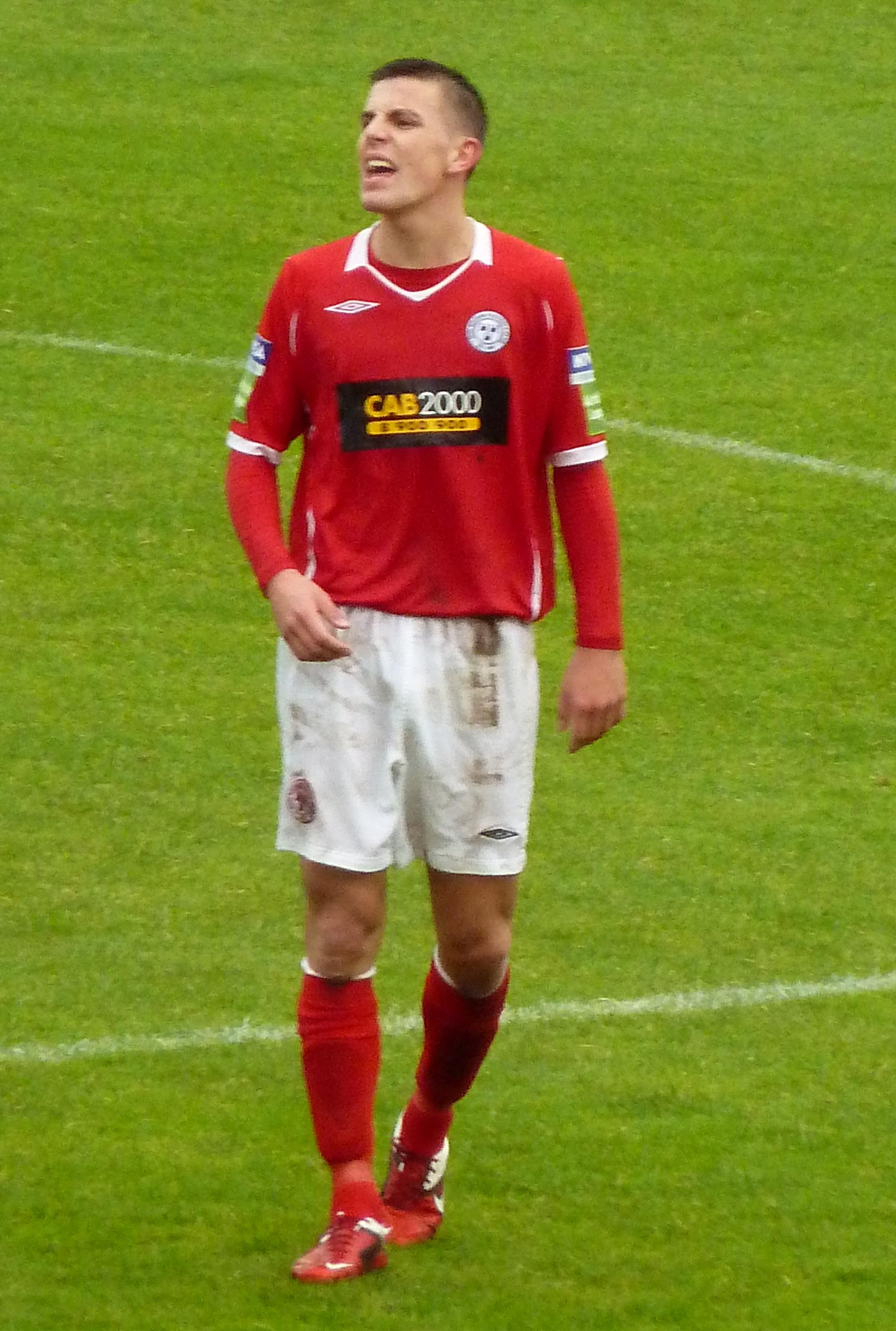
Irish midfielder Kevin Dawson joined the club from Shelbourne during the January transfer window.

The opening of the January transfer window saw Yeovil complete the free transfer of Irish midfielder Kevin Dawson on a contract until the end of the season from League of Ireland side Shelbourne, the signing came too late for Dawson to be permitted to feature in Yeovil's New Year's Day fixture against Leyton Orient. A brace from Paddy Madden and a goal for top scorer James Hayter led Yeovil to a 3–0 victory over Leyton Orient, the result saw Yeovil climb to 9th place in the League One table and to within three points of the play-off positions. Following the game the club confirmed the permanent signing of Carlisle United loanee Madden on two-and-a-half-year deal for an undisclosed fee following the completion of his highly successful loan spell scoring nine goals in sixteen appearances for the Glovers. Yeovil completed their third signing of the transfer window with the addition of left sided midfielder Matthew Dolan on a one-month loan deal from Middlesbrough, but the day also saw the departure of left-back Curtis Haynes-Brown on a free transfer to Football Conference side Cambridge United on a free transfer, Haynes-Brown having only appeared in thirteen matches in eighteen months for Yeovil still had six months left to run on his contract. Prior to the Football League Trophy Southern Area semi-final tie against Leyton Orient, Yeovil confirmed that Fulham defender Dan Burn had extended his youth loan until the end of the season with an agreement for a further extension should Yeovil be involved in the play-offs. With the club funding free transport for away fans to travel to Leyton Orient for the Football League Trophy area semi-final the game saw Yeovil supported by 815 travelling fans for the trip to London, but the match ended in disappointment for the away side with a late Dave Mooney header condemning Yeovil to defeat despite having a man advantage for the last fifteen minutes. On 12 January, Yeovil recorded their first victory over Sheffield United, courtesy of a brace from Paddy Madden on his permanent debut for the club. The 2–0 victory at Bramall Lane saw Yeovil climb to eighth in the league table and to within a point of the play-off positions. Impressive performances from midfielders Kevin Dawson and Matthew Dolan on their league debuts at Sheffield United and in recognition of Paddy Madden's brace all three were included in the League One Team of the Week. On 17 January, Yeovil confirmed the signing of versatile defender/midfielder and former loanee Joe Edwards, from Bristol City on an 18-month contract for an undisclosed fee. Edwards's permanent debut was delayed due to Yeovil's league game against Preston North End, on 19 January, being postponed due to health and safety problems in the area surrounding the stadium because of heavy snowfall in the Yeovil area. On 25 January, out of favour striker Reuben Reid joined his former club Football League Two side Plymouth Argyle on loan for an initial month. Later that day out of favour winger Keanu Marsh-Brown also left the club having his contract cancelled by mutual consent, having not featured in the club's matchday squads since Boxing Day. On 28 January, Yeovil made their fifth signing of the transfer window with Crystal Palace striker Kwesi Appiah joining the club on a month's loan. Yeovil ended their extended break from match action due to postponements with a crucial 2–1 victory over play-off chasers Milton Keynes Dons, on 29 January. A third consecutive brace from Paddy Madden saw the Glovers to victory over the 10-man Dons. The result saw Yeovil end the month in seventh place just one position and three points outside the play-offs, the month seeing them win all three of their league matches and top scorer Paddy Madden scoring six goals in just three appearances. Despite a 100% winning record in the league manager Gary Johnson being lost out in the race for Manager of the Month to Walsall manager Dean Smith, but striker Paddy Madden's six goals were enough to secure him the Player of the Month award.

=== February ===
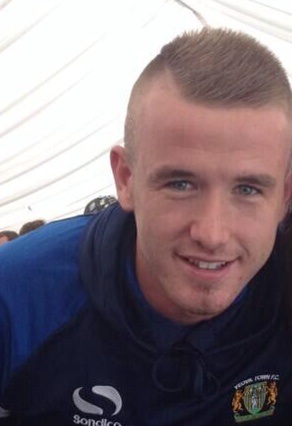
Paddy Madden scored in eight consecutive matches, breaking a fifty-year-old club record.

Yeovil began the month with a home fixture against fellow play-off chasers Brentford, Yeovil won the game 3–0 courtesy of a fourteenth goal of the season for Paddy Madden, superb 25-yard second from Ed Upson on his 100th appearance for the club and a volley from centre back Dan Burn. Both Upson and Burn's performances were recognised with places in the League One Team of the Week. On 5 February, Yeovil were due to play their rearranged fixture against Oldham Athletic but the game was postponed for a second time this time due because of snow. The following Saturday, Yeovil visited Coventry City searching for their sixth consecutive league victory and this was achieved thanks to a goal in first half injury time from in-form Irish striker Paddy Madden. This sound defensive display led to Dan Burn being included in the Team of the Week for the second consecutive week. On 12 February, Yeovil matched their club record for consecutive wins in the Football League with their seventh consecutive victory after coming from behind against Preston North End. The Glovers were trailing to Chris Beardsley's goal at half time, but scored three second-half goals without reply from Hayter, Nathan Ralph and top scorer Paddy Madden with his ninth goal in just six appearances. Yeovil extended their winning run to eight league games with a 3–0 victory over Scunthorpe United, courtesy of goals from Byron Webster, James Hayter and Paddy Madden as Yeovil move up to third place in the League One table. Both Webster and Madden's performances were recognised with places in the League One Team of the Week. The club's record Football League winning run was ended with a 1–1 draw away at Doncaster Rovers, despite an early Madden goal. With Paddy Madden scoring in his eighth consecutive league game he broke a 50-year-old club record previously held by Dennis Coughlin, but the club's nine game unbeaten run came to an abrupt end with a 2–0 defeat against relegation threatened Colchester United. On 28 February, Burnley striker Wes Fletcher joined the club on a one-month loan deal to provide attacking cover at the club. The club finished the month in sixth place in the league table, and a record of four wins, one draw and one defeat was enough for Gary Johnson to be nominated for Manager of the Month but was beaten by Hartlepool United's John Hughes, and Paddy Madden's five goals in six games was enough for a nomination for the Player of the Month award but lost out to fellow Hartlepool player Peter Hartley.

=== March ===
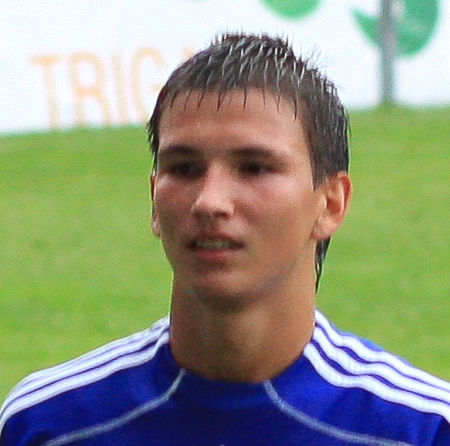
Latvian international Vitālijs Maksimenko joined on loan from Brighton & Hove Albion.

Yeovil began the month with a crucial home fixture against fellow play-off chasers Tranmere Rovers, Yeovil won the game 1–0 thanks to a well-executed free-kick from Ed Upson overtaking Tranmere in the process up to fifth place in the League One table. Ed Upson's fifth goal of the season was enough to see him included in the League One Team of the Week for the second time this season. Following the game it was reported that The Football Association were investigated an incident at the end of the match between Yeovil captain Jamie McAllister and Tranmere winger and former Yeovil player Abdulai Bell-Baggie, with the papers claiming that Bell-Baggie had been racially abused by McAllister. Manager Gary Johnson told the BBC that captain Jamie McAllister was "upset" to be the subject of an inquiry by the Football Association, and would deny any allegations against him. On 9 March, Yeovil played out a goalless draw away at relegation threatened Hartlepool United. On 11 March, Yeovil signed ex-Chelsea full-back and left sided player Ben Gordon on one-month contract as cover for captain Jamie McAllister. Gordon made his full debut the following day replacing the injured Sam Foley, despite taking a two-goal lead after just 18 minutes thanks to goals from Byron Webster and top goalscorer Paddy Madden, a second half turnaround from Crawley Town rescued them a 2–2 draw and ended Yeovil's seven game home winning run. On 14 March, Yeovil Town announced that the club had recorded a profit of £53,379 for the year ended 30 June 2012, with turnover up by 5% at £3.1m. Prior to the clash with Swindon, Yeovil completed the loan signings of Latvian international defender Vitālijs Maksimenko from Brighton & Hove Albion and forward Jordan Cook from Charlton Athletic. The next day Yeovil played Swindon Town at Huish Park live on Sky Sports, The Glovers suffered a 2–0 defeat at the hands of their promotion rivals and slipped out of the play-off places on goal difference. On 23 March, Yeovil faced Carlisle United at Brunton Park despite leading 3–1 with seconds left of normal time courtesy of a first goal for Yeovil from Kevin Dawson and goals from Paddy Madden and James Hayter, they conceded two late goals to draw 3–3. On 26 March, Queens Park Rangers left winger and striker Ángelo Balanta joined the club on loan until the end of the season to provide attacking cover at the club. Kevin Dawson's performance in the Carlisle game was enough to earn him a second nomination of the season to the Football League Team of the Week. On 27 March, Matthew Dolan unexpectedly returned to the club on loan from Middlesbrough until the end of the season, and the following day it was confirmed Reuben Reid would remain at Plymouth Argyle on loan until the end of the season as well. Yeovil played fellow play-off chasers Walsall at home on Good Friday, but both sides lacked attacking quality as a game of few chances ended goalless. The result meant Yeovil had won just one of their last eight games but still remained seventh just a point outside the play-off positions.

=== April ===
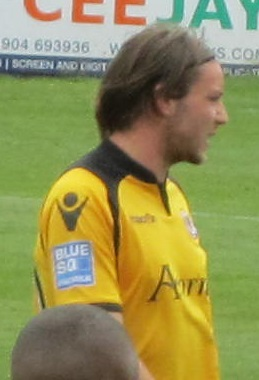
Sam Foley's performance against Stevenage saw him earn a place in the League One Team of the Week.

Yeovil began April, with an Easter Monday fixture away at Notts County, Yeovil claimed a crucial 2–1 victory which reinvigorated their play-off aspirations courtesy of goals from topscorer Paddy Madden and a quality free-kick from Middlesbrough loanee Matthew Dolan on his first start of his second loan spell. On 4 April, the club announced that it would axe its youth academy at the end of the season, citing expense and a lack of progress on a proposed Huish Park development plan as reasons. This followed the closure of the Centre of Excellence at the end of the 2011–12 season which had been closed because the investment and facilities required by the Premier League's Elite Player Performance Plan scheme were not available. On 6 April, Yeovil faced Shrewsbury Town at home and won a tight game 2–1 thanks to a James Hayter penalty and a "stunning solo effort" from top goalscorer Paddy Madden. Madden's performance against Shrewsbury earned him a place in the Football League One Team of the Week. The following week Yeovil faced Stevenage away from home, before the game it was announced that left-sided player Ben Gordon's short term deal had not been renewed so had left the club after only three appearances. A much improved second half performance against Stevenage saw the Glovers run out convincing 2–0 victors, with Sam Foley and Hayter's 15th goal of the season the difference, the victory confirmed Yeovil's place in the end of season play-offs. Foley was recognised for his performance against Stevenage with a place in the League One Team of the Week. On 16 April, Gary Johnson faced his son Lee's Oldham Athletic side, they became only the second father and son to face each other as opposing managers in the Football League. Oldham won the match 1–0 courtesy of a goal from Matt Smith. Yeovil faced Crewe Alexandra in their final home match of the league season, a game which Yeovil won 1–0 thanks to an early Joe Edwards goal, goalkeeper Marek Štěch's man of the match performance was recognised in the League One Team of the Week. The final game of the regular season saw a trip to already relegated side Bury, a disappointing first half performance saw Yeovil lose the game 3–2, despite the defeat Yeovil confirmed their record high finishing position of 4th in League One and confirmed they would face Sheffield United in the League One play-offs. Another solid run of form in April earning 12 points from a possible 18, and a record of four wins, one draw and one defeat was enough for Gary Johnson to be nominated for Manager of the Month, but lost out to Bournemouth manager Eddie Howe.

=== May ===
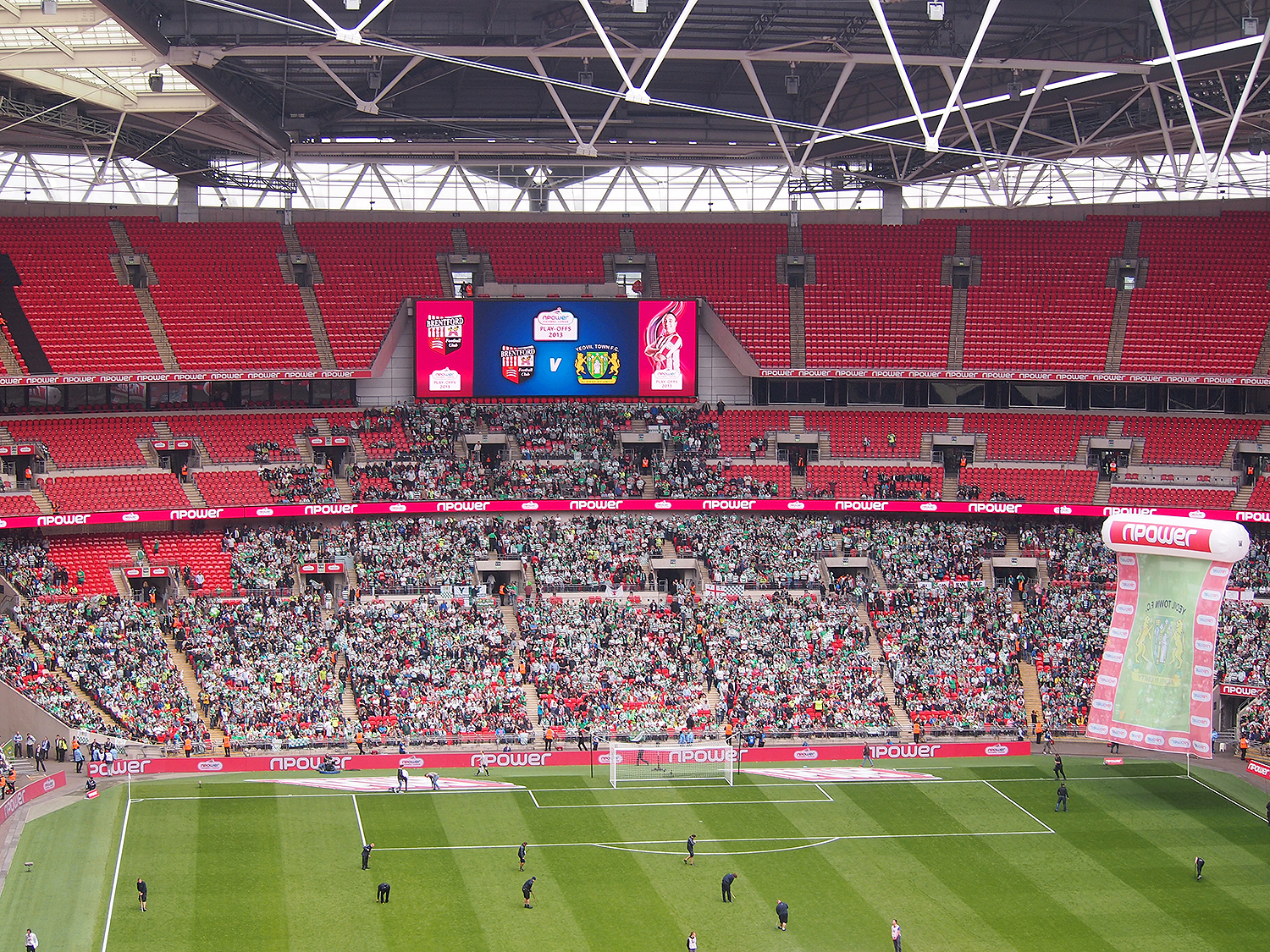
Yeovil fans at Wembley ahead of the 2013 League One play-off final

The first-leg of the play-offs saw Yeovil face Sheffield United at Bramall Lane, on 3 May. Yeovil's defence was strengthened by the return of captain Jamie McAllister and centre backs Byron Webster and Dan Burn from injury, after a cagey first half Sheffield United took the lead just 52 seconds into the second half through teenager Callum McFadzean and held the lead until the final whistle. The return leg at Huish Park was played on 6 May, in front of the club's largest crowd in five years an attendance of 8,152. An early Kevin Dawson goal levelled the tie on aggregate before a late header from Ed Upson sent Yeovil to Wembley, the 2–0 home victory giving Yeovil a 2–1 aggregate victory.

The semi-final victory set up a showdown with Brentford, on 19 May, in the League One play-off final at Wembley Stadium. In front of a crowd of 41,955, around 18,000 of them Yeovil fans, Yeovil named an unchanged side for the final and started brightly with a sixth-minute goal from top scorer Paddy Madden. Fulham loanee Dan Burn doubled late in the first half, before Brentford pulled a goal back through Harlee Dean, but Yeovil held out to win promotion to the Championship for the first time in the club's history. It was also manager Gary Johnson's third promotion as Yeovil manager coming on the 10th anniversary of the club's promotion to the Football League. Following the play-off final victory, manager Gary Johnson was recognised by the League Managers Association and was awarded League One Manager of the Year.

== Summary and aftermath ==
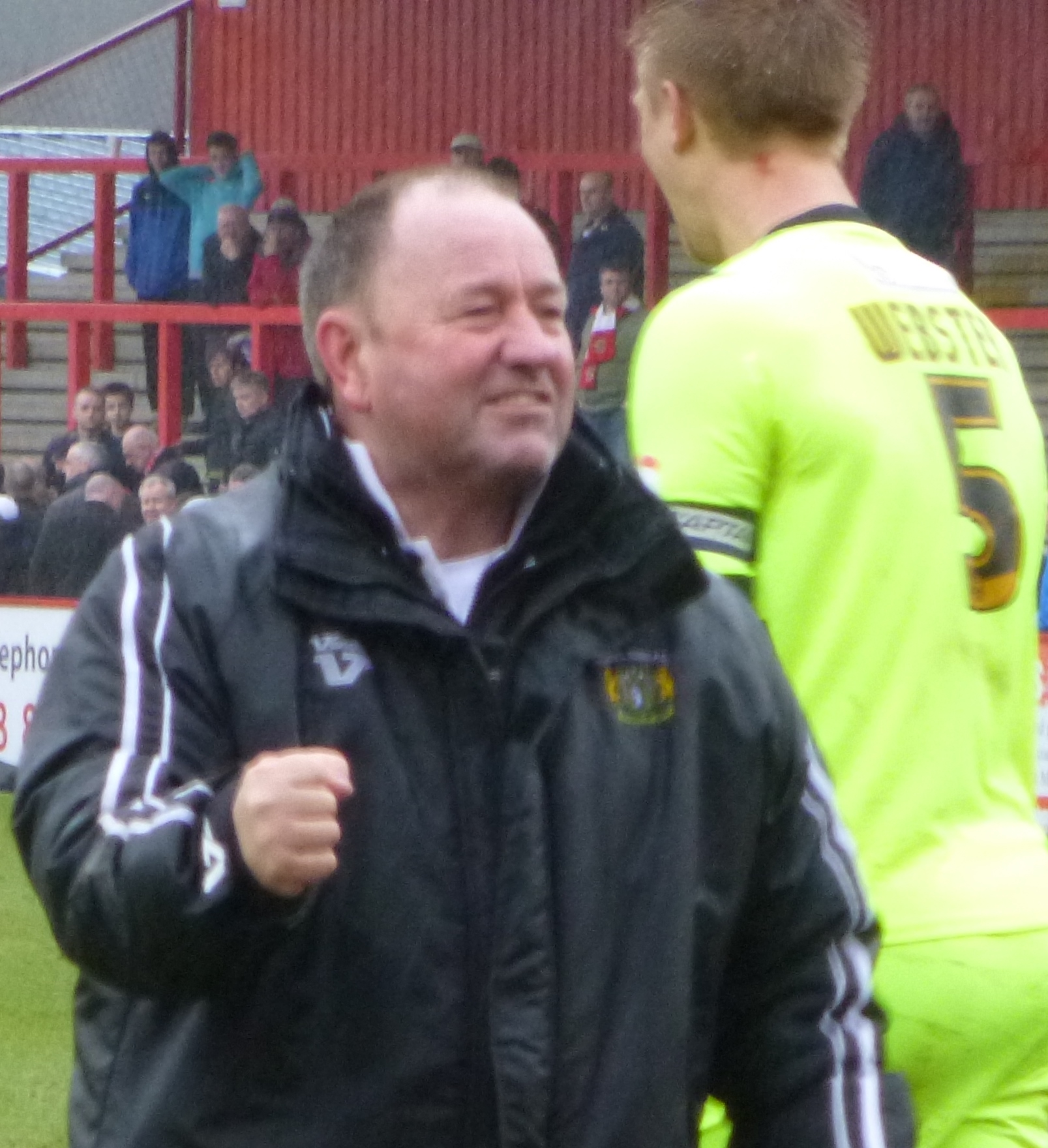
Manager Gary Johnson and his backroom staff signed new two-year contracts.

Yeovil only occupied a play-off position from the middle of February, having briefly risen as high as first place during the first month of the season while dropping to 16th in October. The team won 13 matches, drew 4 and lost 6 at home, compared to winning 10, drawing 4 and losing 9 away from home. Marek Štěch was an everpresent recording the highest number of appearances during the season, appearing in all 56 of Yeovil's games. Paddy Madden was top scorer in all competitions with 23 goals, followed by James Hayter with 16 goals.

Prior to the club's first season in the Football League Championship, Yeovil released Dominic Blizzard, Richard Hinds and Gavin Williams. Manager Gary Johnson and his backroom staff of Terry Skiverton and Darren Way signed new two-year deals to confirm they would lead Yeovil in the Championship. Goalkeeper Matt Cafer was promoted to the first team squad after signing a six-month professional contract with the club. Ahead of the new season midfielders Kevin Dawson and Sam Foley signed new two-year contracts, while defender Nathan Ralph and midfielder Lewis Young were invited back to pre-season training by Gary Johnson.

== Club ==
After returning to the club in January 2012 manager Gary Johnson, Yeovil's backroom staff remained the same for the 2012–13 season, with former manager Terry Skiverton as his assistant, former player Darren Way continuing as technical coach, Gareth Stewart as goalkeeping coach and Mike Micciche as physiotherapist.

On 17 May 2012, the club revealed their kits for the new season designed by Vandanel for the fifth successive season. For the first time, Yeovil's away kit was hooped, a style introduced to the home kit after Yeovil achieved promotion to the Football League 2003. The kits commemorated the tenth anniversary club's promotion to the Football League with lettering around the club crest. After struggling to find a new shirt sponsor the club announced a deal had been agreed with W+S Recycling to be the club's new shirt sponsor, the rear of the shirts displayed the logo of local Italian restaurant chain Tamburino's and the rear of the shorts the logo of Westbury Packaging On 8 May 2013, a new kit was revealed for the 2013 Football League One play-off final designed by Vandanel's sister company Sondico, with the design now boasting white sleeves and an entirely white back.

=== Coaching staff ===
Position	Staff
Manager	Gary Johnson
Assistant manager	Terry Skiverton
Technical coach	Darren Way
Goalkeeping coach	Gareth Stewart
Physiotherapist	Mike Micciche

=== Kit ===
Supplier: Vandanel (Home & Away), Sondico (Play-off Final)
Sponsor(s): W+S Recycling

Home	Away	Play-off Final

== Transfers ==
=== In ===
Date	Name	From	Fee	Ref
1 July 2012	Jamie McAllister	Bristol City	Free (released)	
1 July 2012	Keanu Marsh-Brown	Oldham Athletic	Free (released)	
1 July 2012	Sam Foley	Newport County	Free	
1 July 2012	James Hayter	Doncaster Rovers	Free (released)	
1 July 2012	Reuben Reid	Oldham Athletic	Free (released)	
2 July 2012	Nathan Ralph	Peterborough United	Free (released)	
2 July 2012	Lewis Young	Northampton Town	Free (released)	
4 July 2012	Byron Webster	Northampton Town	Free (released)	
5 July 2012	Marek Štěch	West Ham United	Free (released)	
1 January 2013	Kevin Dawson	Shelbourne	Free (released)	
2 January 2013	Paddy Madden	Carlisle United	Undisclosed (~ £15,000)	
17 January 2013	Joe Edwards	Bristol City	Undisclosed	
11 March 2013	Ben Gordon	Chelsea	Free (released)	

=== Out ===
Date	Name	To	Fee	Ref
4 July 2012	Bondz N'Gala	Stevenage	Undisclosed	
24 July 2012	Anthony Edgar	Barnet	Free	
4 January 2013	Curtis Haynes-Brown	Cambridge United	Free	
25 January 2013	Keanu Marsh-Brown	Barnet	Contract terminated by mutual consent	
13 April 2013	Ben Gordon	Ross County	Released	
30 June 2013	Dominic Blizzard	Plymouth Argyle	Released	
30 June 2013	Richard Hinds	Bury	Released	
30 June 2013	Gavin Williams	Woking	Released	

=== Loan in ===
Date	Name	From	End date	Ref
13 July 2012	Rohan Ince	Chelsea	26 September 2012	
19 July 2012	Gozie Ugwu	Reading	1 January 2013	
23 August 2012	Archange Nkumu	Chelsea	23 September 2012	
15 September 2012	Korey Smith	Norwich City	17 December 2012	
21 September 2012	Joe Edwards	Bristol City	22 December 2012	
25 September 2012	Dan Burn	Fulham	19 May 2013	
4 October 2012	Paddy Madden	Carlisle United	1 January 2013	
23 October 2012	Daniel Johnson	Aston Villa	20 November 2012	
22 November 2012	Dale Bennett	Watford	8 December 2012	
4 January 2013	Matthew Dolan	Middlesbrough	4 March 2013	
28 January 2013	Kwesi Appiah	Crystal Palace	2 March 2013	
28 February 2013	Wes Fletcher	Burnley	1 April 2013	
18 March 2013	Jordan Cook	Charlton Athletic	18 April 2013	
18 March 2013	Vitālijs Maksimenko	Brighton & Hove Albion	19 May 2013	
26 March 2013	Ángelo Balanta	Queens Park Rangers	19 May 2013	
27 March 2013	Matthew Dolan	Middlesbrough	19 May 2013	

=== Loan out ===
Date	Name	To	End date	Ref
23 August 2012	Curtis Haynes-Brown	AFC Wimbledon	27 October 2012	
10 November 2012	Matt Cafer	Sherborne Town	17 November 2012	
22 November 2012	Curtis Haynes-Brown	Cambridge United	2 January 2013	
25 January 2013	Reuben Reid	Plymouth Argyle	28 April 2013	

== Match results ==
League positions are sourced from Statto, while the remaining contents of each table are sourced from the references in the "Ref" column.

=== League One ===
League One match details
Date	League position	Opponents	Venue	Result	Score F–A	Scorers	Attendance	Ref
18 August 2012	12th	Coventry City	H	D	1–1	Hinds	6,006	
21 August 2012	5th	Brentford	A	W	3–1	Hayter (2), Craig (og)	5,269	
25 August 2012	1st	Scunthorpe United	A	W	4–0	Marsh-Brown, Reid, Ugwu (2)	3,279	
1 September 2012	2nd	Doncaster Rovers	H	W	2–1	Hayter, Ugwu	3,535	
8 September 2012	3rd	Bournemouth	H	L	0–1		5,238	
15 September 2012	6th	Milton Keynes Dons	A	L	0–1		7,235	
18 September 2012	11th	Leyton Orient	A	L	1–4	Foley	2,876	
22 September 2012	13th	Sheffield United	H	L	0–1		4,117	
29 September 2012	13th	Preston North End	A	L	2–3	Williams (pen), Burn	8,520	
2 October 2012	16th	Portsmouth	H	L	1–2	Reid (pen)	4,769	
6 October 2012	13th	Colchester United	H	W	3–1	Madden (2), Hayter	3,002	
13 October 2012	14th	Tranmere Rovers	A	L	2–3	Madden, Foley	6,344	
20 October 2012	14th	Bury	H	W	2–1	Webster, Foley	3,386	
23 October 2012	11th	Shrewsbury Town	A	W	3–1	Madden (2), Hayter	4,711	
27 October 2012	10th	Crewe Alexandra	A	W	1–0	Webster	4,176	
6 November 2012	11th	Stevenage	H	L	1–3	Madden	2,900	
10 November 2012	11th	Hartlepool United	H	W	1–0	Edwards	3,095	
17 November 2012	12th	Swindon Town	A	L	1–4	Hayter	8,112	
20 November 2012	12th	Crawley Town	A	W	1–0	Hunt (og)	2,912	
24 November 2012	12th	Carlisle United	H	L	1–3	Reid	3,394	
8 December 2012	13th	Notts County	H	D	0–0		3,355	
15 December 2012	14th	Walsall	A	D	2–2	Reid, Foley	3,160	
22 December 2012	11th	Oldham Athletic	H	W	4–1	Williams (2, 1 pen), Hayter, Madden	3,492	
26 December 2012	12th	Bournemouth	A	L	0–3		8,016	
29 December 2012	12th	Portsmouth	A	W	2–1	Blizzard, Webster	12,370	
1 January 2013	9th	Leyton Orient	H	W	3–0	Madden (2), Hayter	3,516	
12 January 2013	8th	Sheffield United	A	W	2–0	Madden (2)	20,454	
29 January 2013	7th	Milton Keynes Dons	H	W	2–1	Madden (2)	3,152	
2 February 2013	7th	Brentford	H	W	3–0	Madden, Upson, Burn	4,106	
9 February 2013	7th	Coventry City	A	W	1–0	Madden	11,277	
12 February 2013	7th	Preston North End	H	W	3–1	Hayter, Ralph, Madden	3,661	
16 February 2013	3rd	Scunthorpe United	H	W	3–0	Webster, Hayter (pen), Madden	4,163	
23 February 2013	5th	Doncaster Rovers	A	D	1–1	Madden	6,356	
26 February 2013	6th	Colchester United	A	L	0–2		2,367	
2 March 2013	5th	Tranmere Rovers	H	W	1–0	Upson	4,862	
9 March 2013	5th	Hartlepool United	A	D	0–0		3,633	
12 March 2013	6th	Crawley Town	H	D	2–2	Webster, Madden	3,338	
19 March 2013	7th	Swindon Town	H	L	0–2		5,207	
23 March 2013	6th	Carlisle United	A	D	3–3	Dawson, Madden, Hayter	3,809	
29 March 2013	7th	Walsall	H	D	0–0		5,594	
1 April 2013	6th	Notts County	A	W	2–1	Madden, Dolan	5,004	
6 April 2013	3rd	Shrewsbury Town	H	W	2–1	Hayter (pen), Madden	4,473	
13 April 2013	4th	Stevenage	A	W	2–0	Foley, Hayter	3,516	
16 April 2013	5th	Oldham Athletic	A	L	0–1		3,888	
20 April 2013	4th	Crewe Alexandra	H	W	1–0	Edwards	5,293	
27 April 2013	4th	Bury	A	L	2–3	Hayter, Dawson	2,440	

==== League table ====
Pos	Team	Pld	W	D	L	GF	GA	GD	Pts	Promotion, qualification or relegation
2	Bournemouth (P)	46	24	11	11	76	53	+23	83	Promotion to Football League Championship
3	Brentford	46	21	16	9	62	47	+15	79	Qualification for League One play-offs (Note: Four teams play for one spot and promotion to Football League Championship.)
4	Yeovil Town (O, P)	46	23	8	15	71	56	+15	77	Qualification for League One play-offs
5	Sheffield United	46	19	18	9	56	42	+14	75	Qualification for League One play-offs
6	Swindon Town	46	20	14	12	72	39	+33	74	Qualification for League One play-offs

Updated to match(es) played on 27 April 2013. Source: BBC Sport
Rules for classification: 1) Points; 2) Goal difference; 3) Number of goals scored
(O) Play-off winners; (P) Promoted

=== FA Cup ===
FA Cup match details
Round	Date	Opponents	Venue	Result	Score F–A	Scorers	Attendance	Ref
First round	3 November 2012	Preston North End	A	L	0–3		4,757	

=== League Cup ===
League Cup match details
Round	Date	Opponents	Venue	Result	Score F–A	Scorers	Attendance	Ref
First round	14 August 2012	Colchester United	H	W	3–0	Hinds (2), Marsh-Brown	1,907	
Second round	28 August 2012	West Bromwich Albion	H	L	2–4	Reid (2)	6,228	

=== Football League Trophy ===
Football League Trophy match details
Round	Date	Opponents	Venue	Result	Score F–A	Scorers	Attendance	Ref
First round	4 September 2012	Bristol Rovers	A	W	3–0	Upson (2), Foley	2,810	
Second round	16 October 2012	Torquay United	A	D	2–2^{[A]}	Hayter (2)	1,280	
Southern Quarter-final	4 December 2012	Wycombe Wanderers	H	W	2–0	Upson, Foley	1,771	
Southern Semi-final	8 January 2013	Leyton Orient	A	L	0–1		2,755	

=== League One play-offs ===
League One play-offs match details
Round	Date	Opponents	Venue	Result	Score F–A	Scorers	Attendance	Ref
Semi-final first leg	3 May 2013	Sheffield United	A	L	0–1		15,262	
Semi-final second leg	6 May 2013	Sheffield United	H	W	2–0	Dawson, Upson	8,152	
Final	19 May 2013	Brentford	Wembley Stadium	W	2–1	Madden, Burn	41,955	

== Squad statistics ==
Numbers in parentheses denote appearances as substitute.
Players with squad numbers struck through and marked † left the club during the playing season.
Players with names in italics and marked * were on loan from another club for the whole of their season with Yeovil.
Players listed with no appearances have been in the matchday squad but only as unused substitutes.
Key to positions: GK – Goalkeeper; DF – Defender; MF – Midfielder; FW – Forward

No.	Pos.	Nat.	Name	Apps	Goals	Apps	Goals	Apps	Goals	Apps	Goals	Apps	Goals	Apps	Goals	Yellow card	Red card
No.	Pos.	Nat.	Name	League		FA Cup		League Cup		FL Trophy		Play-offs		Total		Discipline	
1	GK	CZE	Marek Štěch	46	0	1	0	2	0	4	0	3	0	56	0	0	0
2	DF	ENG	Luke Ayling	38 (1)	0	0	0	2	0	3	0	3	0	46 (1)	0	4	0
3	DF	SCO	Jamie McAllister	33 (1)	0	1	0	2	0	4	0	3	0	43 (1)	0	10	1
4	DF	ENG	Richard Hinds	15 (4)	1	1	0	2	2	3	0	0 (1)	0	21 (5)	3	3	0
5	DF	ENG	Byron Webster	44 (1)	5	0	0	2	0	3 (1)	0	3	0	51 (2)	5	9	0
6	MF	ENG	Dominic Blizzard	16 (8)	1	1	0	2	0	3	0	0	0	22 (8)	1	2	0
~~7~~ †	MF	ENG	Keanu Marsh-Brown	14 (7)	1	1	0	1 (1)	1	2 (1)	0	0	0	18 (9)	2	5	0
~~7~~ †	FW	ENG	Kwesi Appiah *	1 (4)	0	0	0	0	0	0	0	0	0	1 (4)	0	1	0
~~7~~ †	FW	ENG	Jordan Cook *	0 (1)	0	0	0	0	0	0	0	0	0	0 (1)	0	0	0
8	MF	ENG	Ed Upson	41	2	1	0	2	0	4	3	3	1	51	6	9	2
9	FW	ENG	James Hayter	42 (2)	14	1	0	2	0	4	2	3	0	52 (2)	16	3	0
10	MF	WAL	Gavin Williams	9 (15)	3	1	0	0	0	2 (1)	0	0	0	12 (16)	3	6	0
11	FW	ENG	Reuben Reid	7 (12)	4	0 (1)	0	2	2	2 (1)	0	0	0	11 (14)	6	1	0
12	GK	ENG	Gareth Stewart	0	0	0	0	0	0	0	0	0	0	0	0	0	0
13	DF	LAT	Vitālijs Maksimenko *	2 (1)	0	0	0	0	0	0	0	0 (1)	0	2 (2)	0	1	0
14	MF	IRL	Sam Foley	37 (4)	5	1	0	2	0	4	2	3	0	47 (4)	7	4	0
15	MF	ENG	Lewis Young	2 (13)	0	0	0	0 (2)	0	0	0	0	0	2 (15)	0	1	0
16	DF	ENG	Nathan Ralph	5 (9)	1	0	0	0 (1)	0	0 (2)	0	0	0	5 (12)	1	0	0
~~17~~ †	MF	ENG	Rohan Ince *	1 (1)	0	0	0	0 (1)	0	0 (1)	0	0	0	1 (3)	0	1	0
17	FW	IRL	Paddy Madden	35	22	1	0	0	0	0	0	3	1	39	23	2	0
~~18~~ †	DF	ENG	Archange Nkumu *	0 (1)	0	0	0	0	0	0	0	0	0	0 (1)	0	0	0
18	DF	ENG	Dan Burn *	34	2	1	0	0	0	3	0	3	1	41	3	10	1
~~19~~ †	FW	ENG	Gozie Ugwu *	4 (11)	3	0	0	1 (1)	0	0 (1)	0	0	0	5 (13)	3	2	0
~~19~~ †	DF	ENG	Ben Gordon	1 (2)	0	0	0	0	0	0	0	0	0	1 (2)	0	0	0
~~20~~ †	DF	ENG	Curtis Haynes-Brown	0	0	0 (1)	0	0	0	0	0	0	0	0 (1)	0	0	0
20	DF	ENG	Joe Edwards	32 (3)	2	0	0	0	0	1	0	3	0	36 (3)	2	3	1
~~21~~ †	MF	ENG	Korey Smith *	16 (1)	0	0	0	0	0	2	0	0	0	18 (1)	0	1	0
~~21~~ †	FW	ENG	Wes Fletcher *	0 (1)	0	0	0	0	0	0	0	0	0	0 (1)	0	0	0
22	MF	IRL	Kevin Dawson	20	2	0	0	0	0	0 (1)	0	3	1	23 (1)	3	6	0
23	MF	ENG	Will Agbo	0	0	0	0	0	0	0	0	0	0	0	0	0	0
24	DF	ENG	Mitch Brundle	0	0	0	0	0	0	0	0	0	0	0	0	0	0
~~25~~ †	MF	JAM	Daniel Johnson *	3 (2)	0	0	0	0	0	0	0	0	0	3 (2)	0	1	0
~~26~~ †	DF	ENG	Dale Bennett *	0 (1)	0	0	0	0	0	0	0	0	0	0 (1)	0	0	0
26	MF	ENG	Matthew Dolan *	5 (2)	1	0	0	0	0	0 (1)	0	0 (1)	0	5 (4)	1	1	0
27	MF	ENG	Aidan Chainey	0	0	0	0	0	0	0	0	0	0	0	0	0	0
28	FW	ENG	Melchi Emanuel-Williamson	0	0	0	0	0	0	0	0	0	0	0	0	0	0
29	FW	COL	Ángelo Balanta *	4 (2)	0	0	0	0	0	0	0	0 (1)	0	4 (3)	0	0	0

=== Suspensions ===
Player	Date Received	Offence	Length of suspension	
Jamie McAllister	(red card) v Bristol Rovers, 4 September	Violent conduct	3 matches	Bournemouth (H), Milton Keynes Dons (A), Leyton Orient (A), League One
Ed Upson	(yellow card) (yellow-red card) v Preston North End, 29 September	Second bookable offence	1 match	Portsmouth (H), League One
Byron Webster	(yellow card) v Portsmouth, 2 October	5 cautions	1 match	Colchester United (H), League One
Joe Edwards	(yellow card) (yellow-red card) v Tranmere Rovers, 13 October	Second bookable offence	1 match	Torquay United (A), FL Trophy
Ed Upson	(red card) v Preston North End, 3 November	Serious foul play	4 matches	Stevenage (H), Hartlepool United (H), Swindon Town (A), Crawley Town (A), League One
Jamie McAllister	(yellow card) v Crawley Town, 20 November	5 cautions	1 match	Carlisle United (H), League One
Keanu Marsh-Brown	(yellow card) v Wycombe Wanderers, 4 December	5 cautions	1 match	Notts County (H), League One
Dan Burn	(yellow card) v Walsall, 15 December	5 cautions	1 match	Oldham Athletic (H), League One
Jamie McAllister	(yellow card) v Swindon Town, 19 March	10 cautions	2 matches	Carlisle United (A), Walsall (H), League One
Dan Burn	(yellow card) (yellow-red card) v Stevenage, 13 April	Second bookable offence/10 cautions	2 matches	Oldham Athletic (A), Crewe Alexandra (H), League One

== See also ==
- 2012–13 in English football
- List of Yeovil Town F.C. seasons

== Footnotes ==
A. Yeovil won 5–4 in a penalty shootout following a 2–2 draw after normal time.
