= Ed Upson =

English footballer (born 1989)

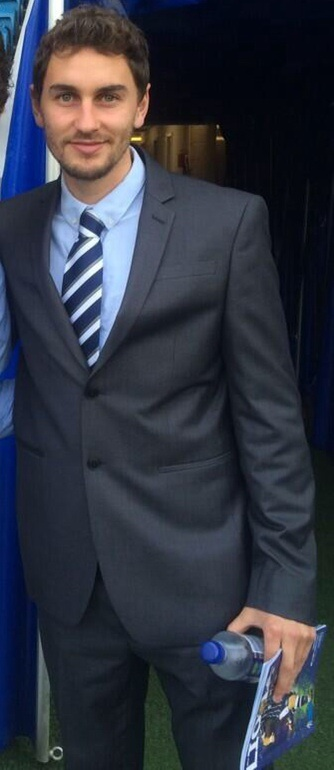
- Upson in 2014

Personal information
- Full name: Edward James Upson
- Date of birth: 21 November 1989 (age 36)
- Place of birth: Bury St Edmunds, England
- Height: 6 ft 0 in (1.82 m)

Youth career
- Ipswich Town

Senior career*
Years	Team	Apps	(Gls)
2007–2010	Ipswich Town	0	(0)
2008	→ Stevenage Borough (loan)	1	(0)
2010	→ Barnet (loan)	9	(1)
2010–2014	Yeovil Town	129	(9)
2014–2016	Millwall	68	(2)
2016–2018	Milton Keynes Dons	79	(6)
2018–2021	Bristol Rovers	94	(4)
2021–2022	Newport County	54	(0)
2023–2025	Bury Town	67	(6)

International career
2005–2006	England U17	2	(0)
2007–2008	England U19	2	(0)
- * Club domestic league appearances and goals as of 21:00, 3 May 2025 (UTC)

Edward James Upson (born 21 November 1989) is an English professional footballer who plays as a midfielder for Southern League Premier Division Central club Bury Town.

Upson has previously been capped for England at under-17 and under-19 level.

== Club career ==
=== Ipswich Town ===
He scored the winning goal for Ipswich Town against Southampton in the FA Youth Cup final in 2005 when he was 15, and signed a professional contract at the age of 17. In 2008, he was loaned to Stevenage Borough, where he made one substitute appearance on 2 September against Kettering Town. He made his Ipswich debut as a substitute in a Football League Cup match at Shrewsbury Town on 11 August 2009. The match went to penalties after a 3–3 draw and Upson scored one of the penalties to help Ipswich through to the next round. After being scouted on many occasions by Barnet manager Ian Hendon, Upson joined the Bees on loan from 12 March 2010 for one month, and made his debut coming on as a second half sub for Albert Jarrett in the 1–1 home draw with Burton Albion. Upson was released by Ipswich at the end of the 2009–10 season.

=== Yeovil Town ===
He joined Yeovil Town on a two-year contract at the start of the 2010–11 season. He scored his first goal for Yeovil in the FA Cup match with Hartlepool United in 2010. On 13 August 2011, he scored his first league goal from outside the area in a 3–1 win over Oldham Athletic, and went one better with a strike from 30 yards to seal a 1–0 win against Wycombe Wanderers on 13 September 2011, this goal was later nominated for Mitre Goal of the Year. He also scored twice in the FA Cup, with goals in the 3–0 win over Hereford United, and the 2–2 draw with Fleetwood Town.

On 6 May 2013, Upson scored an 85th-minute goal in the 2013 Football League play-offs, to help Yeovil beat Sheffield United 2–1 on aggregate, to taking Yeovil to Wembley for the playoff final. A play-off final which they won 2–1 earning promotion to the Football League Championship for the first time in the club's history.

On 3 August 2013, Upson scored the winning goal as Yeovil won their first ever game in the Championship, to secure a 1–0 victory at Millwall.

=== Millwall ===
On 31 January 2014, Upson signed for Championship club, Millwall, for an undisclosed fee signing a two-and-a-half-year contract.

=== Milton Keynes Dons ===
On 3 June 2016, Milton Keynes Dons announced that Upson had signed a two-year deal with the club and would join the squad on 1 July 2016 following his release from fellow League One club Millwall.

On 16 August 2016, Upson scored his first goal for the club, scoring in the 94th minute in a 1–2 home defeat to Bradford City. On 26 November 2016, Upson scored twice in a 1–2 away win over Coventry City.

=== Bristol Rovers ===
On 22 May 2018, it was announced that Upson would leave recently relegated MK Dons and join Bristol Rovers effective from 1 July 2018 upon his contract ending at Milton Keynes. Upson made his debut for the club on the opening day of the season in a 2-1 defeat at Peterborough United and scored his first goal for the club on 28 August 2018, a consolation goal in the 87 minute of a 3-1 EFL Cup defeat to Queens Park Rangers. Upson went on to score one more goal in the 2018–19 season, bundling in a corner in a 2-0 victory over AFC Wimbledon. Upson's time at the club came to an end at the end of the 2020–21 season, a season that saw Rovers relegated to League Two bottom of the league.

=== Newport County ===
On 20 June 2021, it was announced that Upson had agreed a deal to join Newport County on a one-year deal, officially joining the club on 1 July 2021. He made his debut for Newport on 7 August 2021 in the starting line-up for the 1-0 League Two win against Oldham Athletic.

=== Stevenage ===
On 4 January 2022, Upson joined former loan club Stevenage on a deal until the end of the season.

=== Non-League ===
On 23 June 2022, Upson joined Stowmarket Town. Upson previously played for Stowmarket as a youngster. On his 1st game of the season Upson scored a hatrick for the Gold and Blacks. It was revealed in June 2023 that he had been released from the final year of his contract following an agreement being reached.

On 20 June 2023, Upson signed for his hometown club Bury Town on a two-year deal On 3 May 2025, he scored a 94th minute winner as Bury Town defeated Brightlingsea Regent 1–0 to win the Isthmian League North play-off final. His retirement was announced via a twitter post via Bury Town

== International career ==
Upson came on as a substitute for the England national under-19 team against Belarus in September 2007.

== Career statistics ==
As of end of 2024–25 season

Appearances and goals by club, season and competition
Club	Season	League			FA Cup		League Cup		Other		Total	
Club	Season	Division	Apps	Goals	Apps	Goals	Apps	Goals	Apps	Goals	Apps	Goals
Ipswich Town	2007–08	Championship	0	0	0	0	0	0	—		0	0
Ipswich Town	2008–09	Championship	0	0	0	0	0	0	—		0	0
Ipswich Town	2009–10	Championship	0	0	0	0	2	0	—		2	0
Ipswich Town	Total		0	0	0	0	2	0	—		2	0
Stevenage Borough (loan)	2008–09	Conference Premier	1	0	0	0	—		0	0	1	0
Barnet (loan)	2009–10	League Two	9	1	0	0	0	0	0	0	9	1
Yeovil Town	2010–11	League One	23	0	1	1	0	0	0	0	24	1
Yeovil Town	2011–12	League One	41	3	3	2	1	0	0	0	45	5
Yeovil Town	2012–13	League One	41	2	1	0	2	0	7 (Note: 3 appearances and 1 goal in League One play-offs, 4 appearances and 3 goals in Football League Trophy)	4	51	6
Yeovil Town	2013–14	Championship	24	4	2	0	2	1	—		28	5
Yeovil Town	Total		129	10	7	3	5	1	7	4	147	18
Millwall	2013–14	Championship	10	0	0	0	0	0	—		10	0
Millwall	2014–15	Championship	26	2	2	0	0	0	—		28	2
Millwall	2015–16	League One	32	0	1	0	1	0	5 (Note: Appearances in Football League Trophy)	0	39	0
Millwall	Total		68	2	3	0	1	0	5	0	77	2
Milton Keynes Dons	2016–17	League One	42	3	4	0	1	0	1 (Note: Appearance(s) in EFL Trophy)	0	48	3
Milton Keynes Dons	2017–18	League One	37	3	4	1	2	0	2	0	45	4
Milton Keynes Dons	Total		79	6	8	1	3	0	3	0	93	7
Bristol Rovers	2018–19	League One	35	1	1	0	2	1	6	0	44	2
Bristol Rovers	2019–20	League One	33	2	5	0	1	0	5	0	44	2
Bristol Rovers	2020–21	League One	26	1	2	0	1	0	4	0	33	1
Bristol Rovers	Total		94	4	8	0	4	1	15	0	121	5
Newport County	2021–22	League Two	16	0	0	0	2	0	1	0	19	0
Stevenage	2021–22	League Two	15	0	—		—		—		15	0
Stowmarket Town	2022–23	Isthmian League North	33	7	2	1	0	0	4 (Note: Appearance(s) in FA Trophy)	1	39	9
Bury Town	2023–24	Isthmian League North	30	4	2	0	—		3 (Note: Two appearances in FA Trophy, one appearance in Isthmian League North play-offs)	0	35	4
Bury Town	2024–25	Isthmian League North	37	2	2	0	—		4 (Note: One appearance in FA Trophy, one appearance in Suffolk Senior Cup, two appearances and one goal in Isthmian League North play-offs)	1	43	3
Bury Town	Total		67	6	4	0	0	0	7	1	78	7
Career total			505	35	32	5	17	2	39	4	590	47

== Honours ==
Ipswich Town

- FA Youth Cup: 2004–05

Yeovil Town

- Football League One play-offs: 2013

Bury Town

- Isthmian League North Division play-offs: 2025
