= Nathan Ralph =

English footballer (born 1993)

Personal information
- Full name: Nathanael Anthony Ralph
- Date of birth: 14 February 1993 (age 33)
- Place of birth: Great Dunmow, England
- Height: 5 ft 9 in (1.75 m)
- Positions: Left wing back; center-back

Team information
- Current team: Chelmsford City
- Number: 6

Youth career
- 2005–2009: Ipswich Town
- 2009–2010: Peterborough United

Senior career*
Years	Team	Apps	(Gls)
2010–2012	Peterborough United	0	(0)
2012	→ Kettering Town (loan)	14	(0)
2012–2015	Yeovil Town	35	(1)
2015–2016	Newport County	0	(0)
2016	→ Aldershot Town (loan)	12	(1)
2016–2018	Woking	63	(1)
2018–2019	Dundee	26	(1)
2019–2026	Southend United	178	(8)
2026–	Chelmsford City	17	(0)
- * Club domestic league appearances and goals as of 18:00, 22 November 2026 (UTC)

Nathanael Anthony Ralph (born 14 February 1993) is an English footballer, who plays as a left wingback or center back for National League South club Chelmsford City.

== Career ==
=== Yeovil Town ===
On 14 August 2012, Ralph made his Yeovil debut in the Football League Cup against Colchester United in a 3–0 victory. He scored his first goal for the club in a 3–1 victory over Preston in a League One match, having come on as a substitute midway through the second half. He made 17 appearances in the 2012–13 campaign, though did not feature in the play-off final victory over Brentford which took the "Glovers" into the Championship.

Ralph was released by Yeovil at the end of the 2014–15 season following their relegation to League Two.

=== Newport County ===
On 25 June 2015, Ralph signed for League Two club Newport County. His time at Newport was beset by injuries and although he made the substitutes bench on a number of occasions he did not make a competitive appearance. On 12 February 2016, he joined Aldershot Town on loan until the end of the 2015–16 season. He was released by Newport on 10 May 2016 at the end of his contract.

=== Woking ===
On 3 August 2016, Ralph signed a one-year contract with Woking. On 6 August 2016, Ralph made his Woking debut in a 3–1 home defeat against Lincoln City, playing the full 90 minutes. Three days later, Ralph went onto score his first Woking goal in a 2–2 draw with Solihull Moors. On 15 June 2017, Ralph signed a new one-year deal for the 2017–18 campaign.

=== Dundee ===
On 31 May 2018, Ralph signed a two-year deal with Scottish Premiership side Dundee. He won the club's player of the year award for 2018/19, but they were relegated. Ralph then exercised a clause in his contract that allowed him to become a free agent.

=== Southend United ===
Southend United signed Ralph to a two-year contract, with an option for a third year, in July 2019. He scored his first goal for Southend when he scored in an EFL Trophy tie against AFC Wimbledon on 13 November 2019. He dislocated his shoulder in December 2019.

In December 2023, Ralph signed a contract extension with Southend until the summer of 2025, again with the possibility of a one-year extension having become club captain during his time there.

In June 2025, Ralph triggered an automatic one-year extension keeping him at Southend until June 2026. In his final game of his 7-year spell with the Shrimpers, Ralph captained the club in the 2026 FA Trophy final where Southend defeated Wealdstone on penalties and left the club with silverware.

=== Chelmsford City ===
On 30 May 2026, National League South club Chelmsford City announced the signing of Ralph.

== Career statistics ==
As of match played 5 September 2026

Appearances and goals by club, season and competition
Club	Season	League			National Cup		League Cup		Other		Total	
Club	Season	Division	Apps	Goals	Apps	Goals	Apps	Goals	Apps	Goals	Apps	Goals
Peterborough United	2010–11	League One	0	0	0	0	0	0	0	0	0	0
Peterborough United	2011–12	Championship	0	0	0	0	0	0	—		0	0
Peterborough United	Total		0	0	0	0	0	0	0	0	0	0
Kettering Town (loan)	2011–12	Conference Premier	14	0	0	0	—		0	0	14	0
Yeovil Town	2012–13	League One	14	1	0	0	1	0	2 (Note: Appearances in Football League Trophy)	0	17	1
Yeovil Town	2013–14	Championship	0	0	0	0	0	0	—		0	0
Yeovil Town	2014–15	League One	21	0	1	0	1	0	1	1	24	1
Yeovil Town	Total		35	1	1	0	2	0	3	1	41	2
Newport County	2015–16	League Two	0	0	0	0	0	0	0	0	0	0
Aldershot Town (loan)	2015–16	National League	12	1	0	0	—		0	0	12	1
Woking	2016–17	National League	31	1	3	0	—		0	0	34	1
Woking	2017–18	National League	32	0	6	0	—		1 (Note: Appearances in FA Trophy)	0	39	0
Woking	Total		63	1	9	0	—		1	0	73	1
Dundee	2018–19	Scottish Premiership	26	1	2	0	4	0	—		32	1
Southend United	2019–20	League One	17	0	1	0	1	0	1 (Note: Appearances in EFL Trophy)	1	20	1
Southend United	2020–21	League Two	7	1	0	0	0	0	1	0	8	1
Southend United	2021–22	National League	28	1	1	1	0	0	2	0	31	2
Southend United	2022–23	National League	27	0	0	0	0	0	3	1	30	1
Southend United	2023–24	National League	36	2	0	0	0	0	1	1	37	3
Southend United	2024–25	National League	40	2	2	0	0	0	6 (Note: 3 appearances in the FA Trophy, 3 appearances and 1 goal in the National League play-offs)	1	48	3
Southend United	2025–26	National League	23	2	1	0	–		3	0	27	2
Southend United	Total		178	8	5	1	1	0	17	4	201	13
Chelmsford City	2026–27	National League South	6	0	0	0	0	0	0	0	6	0
Career total			333	12	17	1	7	0	21	5	379	18

== Honours ==
Southend United

- FA Trophy: 2025–26

Individual

- Andrew De Vries Player of the Year: 2018–19
- Dundee Players' Player of the Year: 2018–19
