= Richard Hinds =

English footballer

Personal information
- Full name: Richard Paul Hinds
- Date of birth: 22 August 1980 (age 46)
- Place of birth: Sheffield, England
- Height: 6 ft 2 in (1.88 m)
- Position: Defender

Youth career
- –1998: Tranmere Rovers

Senior career*
Years	Team	Apps	(Gls)
1998–2003	Tranmere Rovers	55	(0)
2003–2005	Hull City	45	(1)
2005	→ Scunthorpe United (loan)	7	(0)
2005–2007	Scunthorpe United	86	(8)
2007–2011	Sheffield Wednesday	67	(2)
2011–2012	Lincoln City	9	(1)
2012–2013	Yeovil Town	35	(2)
2013–2014	Bury	10	(1)
2014–2015	Llandudno	5	(0)
Total		319	(15)
- * Club domestic league appearances and goals

Richard Paul Hinds (born 22 August 1980 in Sheffield, South Yorkshire) is an English footballer who most recently played as a defender for Llandudno in the Welsh Premier League. He is now a teacher at Birkenhead High School Academy Juniors.

== Playing career ==
Hinds started his career in the academy of Tranmere Rovers before being promoted to the senior squad, where he made appearances for the first team.

After 51 appearances, in July 2003 he signed for Hull City in League Two. Having initially signed a one-year deal with the club, an impressive start to his Tigers career saw him, in October 2003, sign an extension to his deal which would keep him at the club until the end of the 2004/05 season. He helped Hull City win promotion to League One and in all made 48 appearances for the Tigers and scoring once against Macclesfield Town.

In March 2005 he joined Scunthorpe United on loan.

In May 2005 he was released by Hull City and was signed on a Bosman transfer only two months in his spell.

In July 2007, Hinds transferred to his hometown club of Sheffield Wednesday after rejecting a contract from Scunthorpe and agreeing to sign on a two-year deal with the Owls. His first goal came as he headed home the winner in a 2–1 victory against Blackpool at Hillsborough on 27 October 2007.

In only the second game of the 2008–09 season, a 1–4 defeat away at Wolverhampton Wanderers, Hinds suffered a severe fracture of his left leg. The injury looked like keeping him out for the majority of the remaining season but he returned in late February and once again became a regular member of the squad and in mid-march began claiming his place in the centre of the Owls defence at the expense of Mark Beevers. Hinds remained a firm fan favourite at Sheffield Wednesday, as he became one of the shining lights of the team and a rock at the centre of the defence. However, in the 2009–10 season he failed to hold down a place in the squad.

On 10 May 2011, Hinds was released from his contract by Sheffield Wednesday along with teammate Tommy Miller. On 4 November 2011, Richard Hinds signed with Conference side Lincoln City until the end of the year.

On 2 February 2012, Hinds signed for League One side Yeovil Town on a contract until the end of April 2012 as cover for suspended captain Paul Huntington. He made his debut against former club Sheffield Wednesday, and scored his first Yeovil goal in a 3–1 win over Rochdale. With Hinds short-term contract finishing at the end of April he missed the club's final match of the season but agreed a new one-year deal in late May. On 14 August 2012, Hinds scored two of Yeovil's goals in a 3–0 win over Colchester United in the Football League Cup. He then scored again the following Saturday in League One, against Coventry City, in a 1–1 draw. Hinds was an unused substitute in the 2013 League One play-off final against Brentford on 19 May 2013, as Yeovil won promotion to the Championship for the first time in the club's history. Hinds was released by the Yeovil at the end of the season having not been offered a new contract.

On 18 July 2013, Bury signed Hinds on a one-year contract after a successful trial. Hinds scored his first goal for Bury in the 1st round of the Football League Cup against Crewe Alexandra. Bury went on to win the match 3–2. He scored his first league goal for the club in a 3–0 win over Hartlepool United. Hinds was released at the end of the 2013–14 season by Bury.

Hinds joined Cymru Alliance side Llandudno on 22 August 2014 in a player/assistant manager capacity.

== Personal life ==
In 2011, Hinds attained a first-class honours degree in law from the Open University, believing that "footballers should plan for life after football while they are still playing".

== Career statistics ==
As of 5 May 2014.

Appearances and goals by club, season and competition
Club	Season	League			FA Cup		League Cup		Other^{[A]}		Total	
Club	Season	Division	Apps	Goals	Apps	Goals	Apps	Goals	Apps	Goals	Apps	Goals
Tranmere Rovers	1998–99	First Division	2	0	0	0	0	0	0	0	2	0
Tranmere Rovers	1999–00	First Division	6	0	0	0	0	0	0	0	6	0
Tranmere Rovers	2000–01	First Division	29	0	5	0	6	0	0	0	40	0
Tranmere Rovers	2001–02	Second Division	10	0	0	0	1	0	1	0	12	0
Tranmere Rovers	2002–03	Second Division	8	0	0	0	1	0	0	0	9	0
Tranmere Rovers	Total		55	0	5	0	8	0	1	0	69	0
Hull City	2003–04	Third Division	39	1	1	0	1	0	1	0	42	1
Hull City	2004–05	League One	6	0	0	0	0	0	1	0	7	0
Hull City	Total		45	1	1	0	1	0	2	0	49	1
Scunthorpe United (loan)	2004–05	League Two	7	0	0	0	0	0	0	0	7	0
Scunthorpe United	2005–06	League One	42	6	3	0	1	1	1	0	47	7
Scunthorpe United	2006–07	League One	44	2	3	0	2	0	2	0	51	2
Scunthorpe United	Total		93	8	6	0	3	1	3	0	105	9
Sheffield Wednesday	2007–08	Championship	38	2	2	0	2	0	0	0	42	2
Sheffield Wednesday	2008–09	Championship	14	0	0	0	0	0	0	0	14	0
Sheffield Wednesday	2009–10	Championship	11	0	0	0	2	0	0	0	13	0
Sheffield Wednesday	2010–11	League One	4	0	1	0	1	0	0	0	6	0
Sheffield Wednesday	Total		67	2	3	0	5	0	0	0	75	2
Lincoln City	2011–12	Conference National	9	0	0	0	0	0	0	0	9	0
Yeovil Town	2011–12	League One	16	1	0	0	0	0	0	0	16	1
Yeovil Town	2012–13	League One	18	1	1	0	2	2	4	0	25	3
Yeovil Town	Total		35	2	1	0	2	2	4	0	42	4
Bury	2013–14	League Two	10	1	1	0	1	1	1	0	13	2
Career totals			314	14	17	0	20	4	11	0	362	18

A. The "Other" column constitutes appearances and goals (including those as a substitute) in the Football League Trophy and Play-off matches.

== Honours ==
Scunthorpe United

- Football League One: 2006–07

Yeovil Town

- Football League One play-offs: 2013
