= Dan Burn =

English footballer (born 1992)

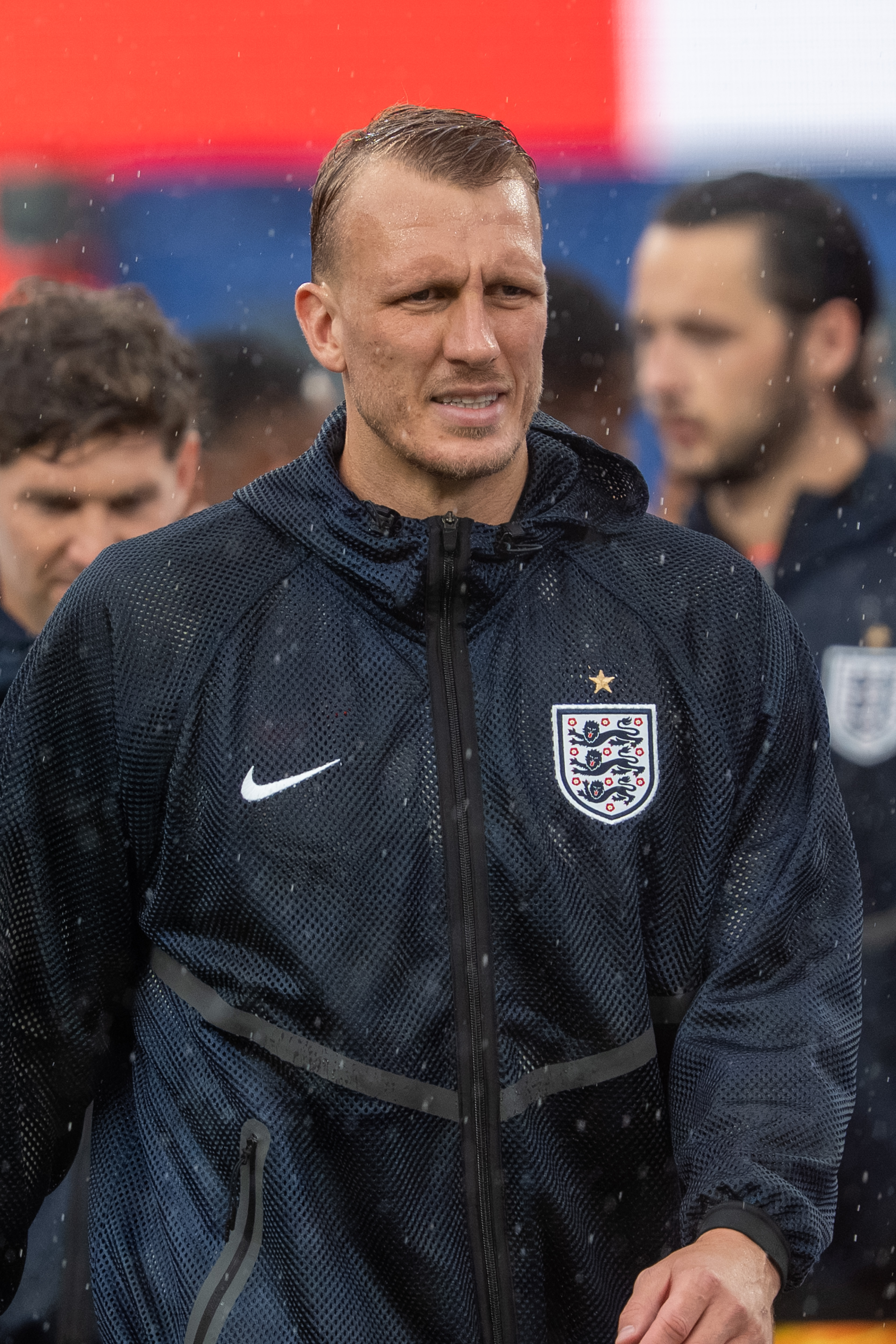
- Burn with England in 2026

Personal information
- Full name: Daniel Johnson Burn
- Date of birth: 9 May 1992 (age 34)
- Place of birth: Blyth, England
- Height: 6 ft 7 in (2.01 m)
- Positions: Centre-back; left-back

Team information
- Current team: Newcastle United
- Number: 33

Youth career
- –2003: Newcastle United
- New Hartley
- Blyth Town
- –2009: Blyth Spartans
- 2009: Darlington

Senior career*
Years	Team	Apps	(Gls)
2009–2011	Darlington	14	(0)
2011–2016	Fulham	61	(1)
2012–2013	→ Yeovil Town (loan)	34	(2)
2013–2014	→ Birmingham City (loan)	24	(0)
2016–2018	Wigan Athletic	87	(6)
2018–2022	Brighton & Hove Albion	74	(2)
2018–2019	→ Wigan Athletic (loan)	14	(0)
2022–	Newcastle United	156	(5)

International career^{‡}
2025–	England	13	(0)
Medal record
Men's football
Representing England
FIFA World Cup
Third place	2026 Canada–Mexico–US
- * Club domestic league appearances and goals as of 23:17, 25 October 2026 (UTC) ‡ National team caps and goals as of 21:49, 15 November 2026 (UTC)

Daniel Johnson Burn (born 9 May 1992) is an English professional footballer who plays either as a centre-back or left-back for Premier League club Newcastle United, whom he captains and the England national team.

Burn made his debut in the English Football League for Darlington in 2009 and joined Fulham at the end of the 2010–11 season, having made 19 appearances for Darlington. He spent the 2012–13 season on loan to Yeovil Town, for whom he made 41 appearances, and spent part of the following season on loan to Birmingham City. He joined Wigan Athletic when his contract with Fulham expired at the end of the 2015–16 season. Burn signed for Brighton & Hove Albion ahead of the 2018–19 season, and was loaned back to Wigan until January 2019. He established himself as a regular Premier League player with Brighton from the 2019–20 season before signing for boyhood club Newcastle United in January 2022, where he scored in the 2025 EFL Cup final as Newcastle won their first domestic trophy in 70 years.

== Club career ==
=== Darlington ===
Born in Blyth, Northumberland, Burn grew up supporting Newcastle United and idolised Alan Shearer. Initially a goalkeeper, Burn was released by Newcastle United at age 11 and then played youth football for local teams New Hartley, Blyth Town and Blyth Spartans. At age 16, Burn stayed on at school to study sports science and had a part-time job at his local Asda supermarket. While playing for Blyth Spartans, he was scouted by Darlington and joined that club's YTS scheme in July 2009.

Due to the club's financial problems and lack of available players, Burn was promoted to the first team for the first time and appeared as an unused substitute in a 3–1 loss against Hereford United on 31 October 2009. Burn then made his away league debut coming on as a 19th-minute substitute for injured defender Mark Bower against Torquay United on 12 December 2009, which resulted in a 5–0 loss. Burn then made his first start in another encounter against Torquay United on 6 March 2010, which Darlington lost 3–1. He made four appearances in the 2009–10 season as Darlington were relegated to the Conference.

After this, Burn returned to the academy to further his development before being recalled to the first team by manager Mark Cooper, where he made his first appearance of the 2010–11 season, in a 3–1 win against Barrow on 3 January 2011. He went on to make 15 appearances in the 2010–11 season and his performances were praised by Cooper. Burn finished second behind Jamie Chandler for the club's Young Player of the Year award.

Burn attracted interest from Premier League clubs including Fulham. Darlington gave him a two-and-a-half-year contract on improved terms, but Cooper admitted they were unlikely to be able to keep him, claiming that "If I were a Premier League manager I would sign him straight away, whatever the cost".

=== Fulham ===
On 14 April 2011, a deal was agreed for Burn to join Premier League club Fulham at the end of the 2010–11 season for a fee thought to be around £350,000. After signing for Fulham, Burn was sent to the club's reserve team to develop and learn under the club's reserve manager Billy McKinlay.

==== Loan to Yeovil Town ====
On 25 September 2012, Burn joined League One club Yeovil Town on a youth loan deal for an initial month. Four days later, he made his debut against Preston North End. Burn scored an own goal for Preston in the 86th minute but then went on to score his first senior goal a minute later. Yeovil lost the match 3–2. Burn managed to establish himself in the first team at Yeovil Town and had his loan extended twice: On 23 October, Fulham confirmed that Burn's loan deal with Yeovil had been extended until 20 November 2012 and then extended again until the end of the season. Burn then scored his second goal for Yeovil Town on 2 February 2013, in a 3–0 win over Brentford. Having previously been suspended after being booked five times this season, Burn received a red card after a second bookable offence, in a 2–0 win over Stevenage on 13 April 2013 and missed the last three matches.

After serving three matches, Burn returned to the first team, playing in the first leg of the play-off, in a 1–0 loss against Sheffield United. Burn then helped the club overcome the deficit in the second leg, in a 2–1 win. Burn scored at Wembley Stadium for Yeovil during the 2013 League One play-off final gaining Yeovil Town promotion to the Championship for the first time in their history. Burn returned to Fulham having made 41 appearances for Yeovil and scored three goals.

==== Loan to Birmingham City ====
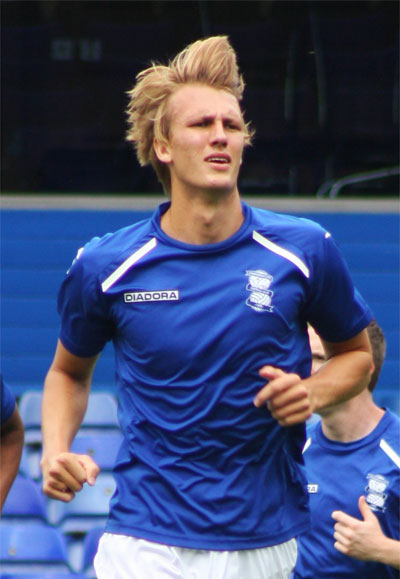
Burn with Birmingham City in 2013

Ahead of the 2013–14 season, Burn stated he was keen on returning to Yeovil Town. However, on 3 July 2013, Burn signed a new contract with Fulham, keeping him at the club until at least 2015, while also moving on a season-long loan to Championship side Birmingham City. He made his debut in a 1–0 defeat at home to Watford on 3 August 2013, and remained a regular member of the starting eleven. His first goal for the club, a header from a Paul Caddis cross, opened the scoring in the League Cup third-round tie on 25 September, as Birmingham beat holders Swansea City 3–1.

==== Return to Fulham ====
Burn was recalled by Fulham on 2 January 2014. After being recalled, Burn made his first-team debut for Fulham on 4 January 2014, in the FA Cup third round against Norwich City at Carrow Road. Following the Norwich game, Fulham manager René Meulensteen said that he expected Burn would re-join Birmingham City on loan for the second time, but the move never happened.

Burn then went on to make his Premier League debut in a 2–0 loss against Arsenal on 18 January 2014. After the match, Burn's performance was praised by Meulensteen. Burn was given a handful of first team appearances until he suffered a muscle injury. After being sidelined for weeks, Burn returned to the first team on 3 May 2014, playing 58 minutes, in a 4–1 loss against Stoke City, which relegated the club to the Championship next season.

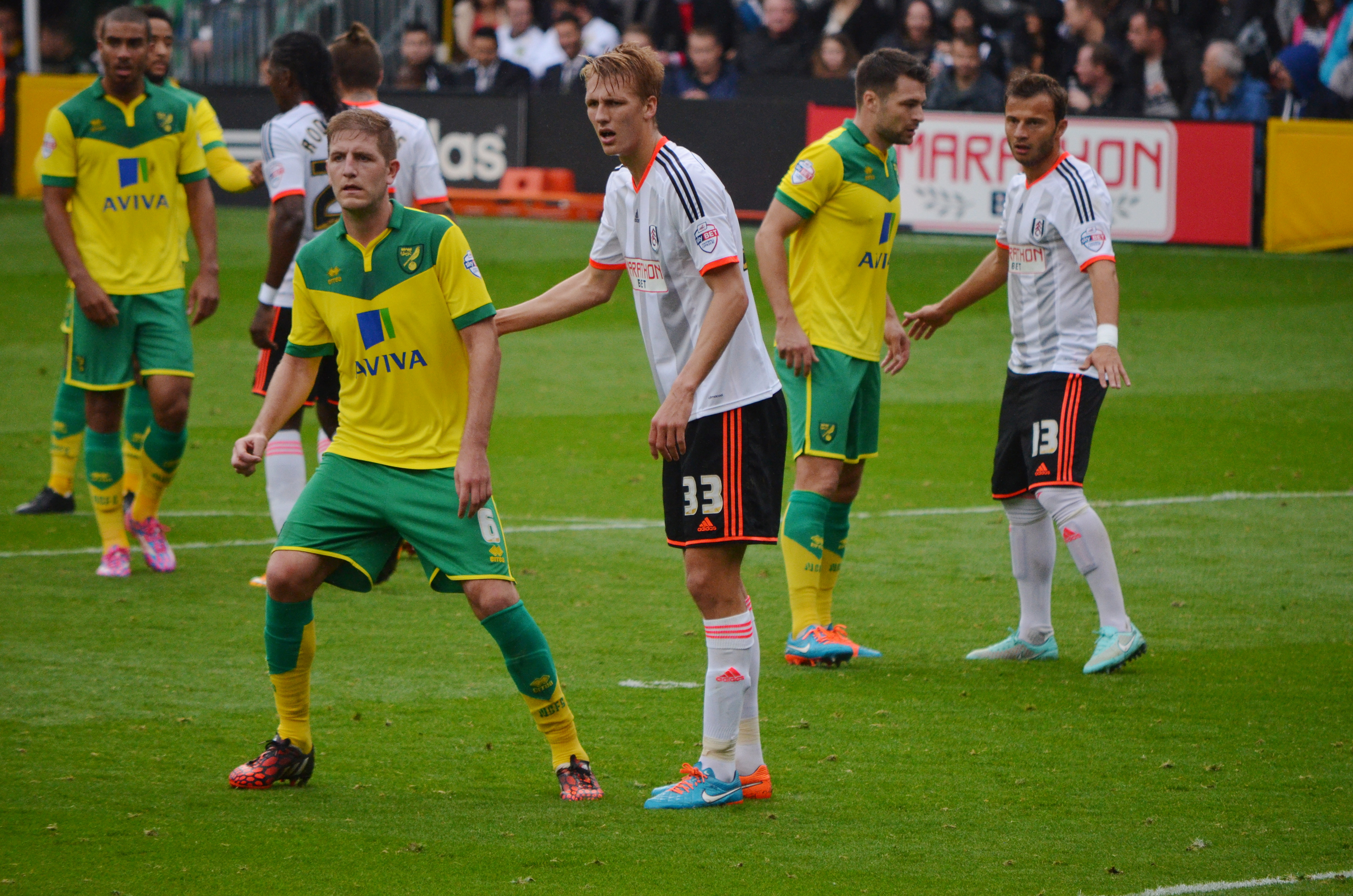
Burn (centre) playing for Fulham in 2014

In the 2014–15 season, Burn made his first appearance of the season, in a 1–1 draw against Cardiff City on 30 August 2014. He scored his first goal for Fulham in a League Cup tie against Doncaster Rovers on 23 September 2014. On 21 October 2014, Burn captained Fulham for the first time and scored his first league goal of the season, in a 3–3 draw against Rotherham United. However, Burn struggled to regain his first team, where he spent most of the season on the substitute bench. On 27 January 2015, Burn signed a contract extension with the club, keeping him until 2016. Burn later finished the 2014–15 season, making 22 appearances and scoring once in all competitions.

In the 2015–16 season, Burn provided assist for Cauley Woodrow to equalise the last minute goal, in a 1–1 draw against Huddersfield Town on 22 August 2015. After the match, Burn was named the Man of the Match by fans. In a 0–0 draw against Middlesbrough on 17 October 2015, Burn formed a partnership with Richard Stearman and the pair kept a 0–0 and Burn was named Man of the Match ahead of Stearman. Burn soon lost his first team place under the interim-management of Peter Grant, but soon regained his first team place under the management of Stuart Gray and Slaviša Jokanović. Having become a first team regular under Jokanović, the club had started a contract talk with Burn. Burn helped the club retain their Championship status next season when they finished 20th place and made thirty–five appearances in all competitions.

At the end of the 2015–16 season, Burn was released by the club after his contract came to an end.

=== Wigan Athletic ===
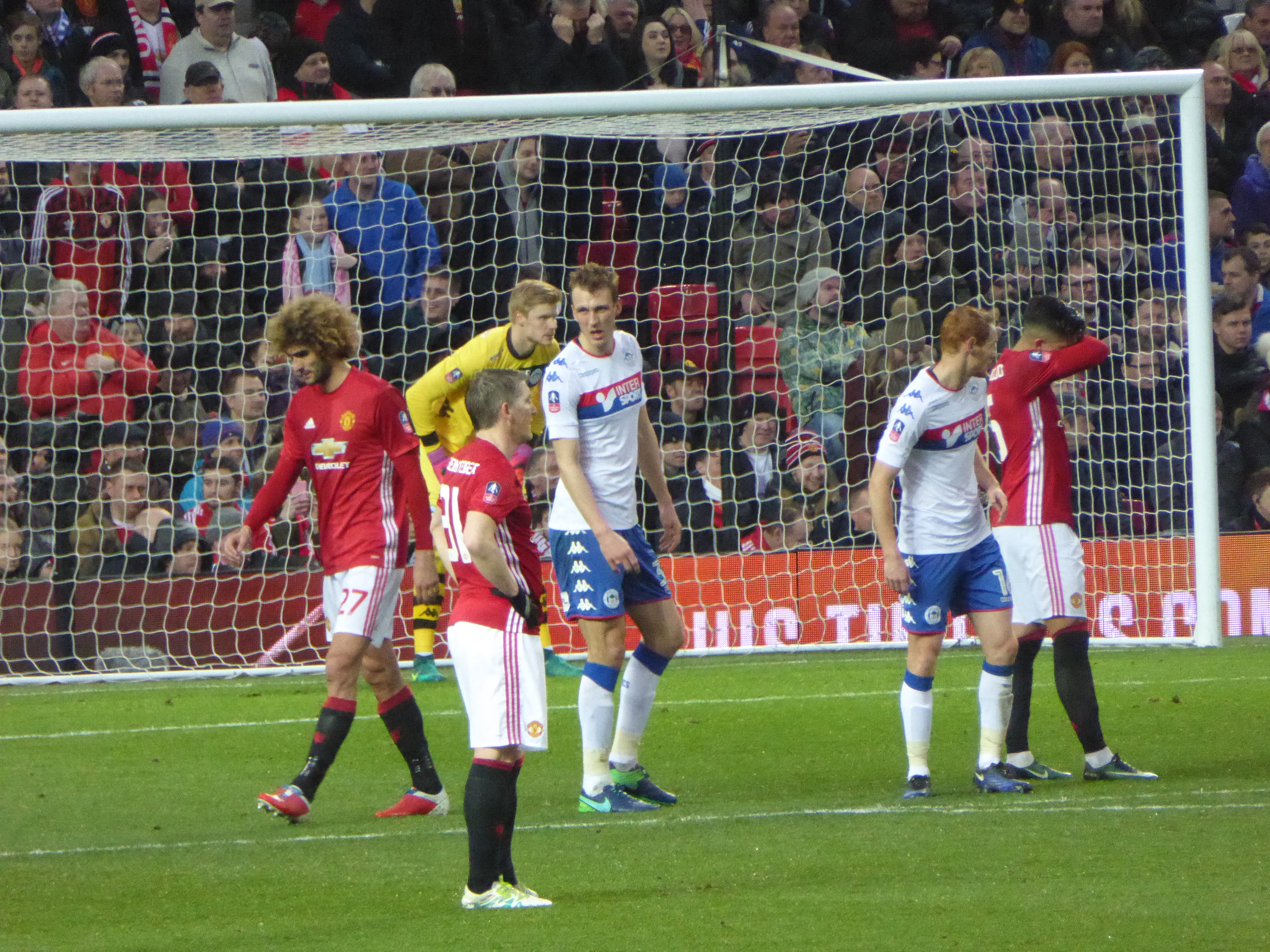
Burn (centre) playing for Wigan Athletic in 2017

Burn signed a three-year contract with newly promoted Championship club Wigan Athletic, to begin when his contract with Fulham expired at the end of the 2015–16 season. He was given squad number 33.

Burn made his Wigan Athletic debut in the opening game of the season, starting in a 2–1 loss against Bristol City. After a slow start to the season Burn became one of the stand out performers in the team and was recognised in winning the club's Player of the Year award. He scored his first goal for Wigan in a 1–0 win at former club Birmingham City on 7 March 2017.

=== Brighton & Hove Albion ===
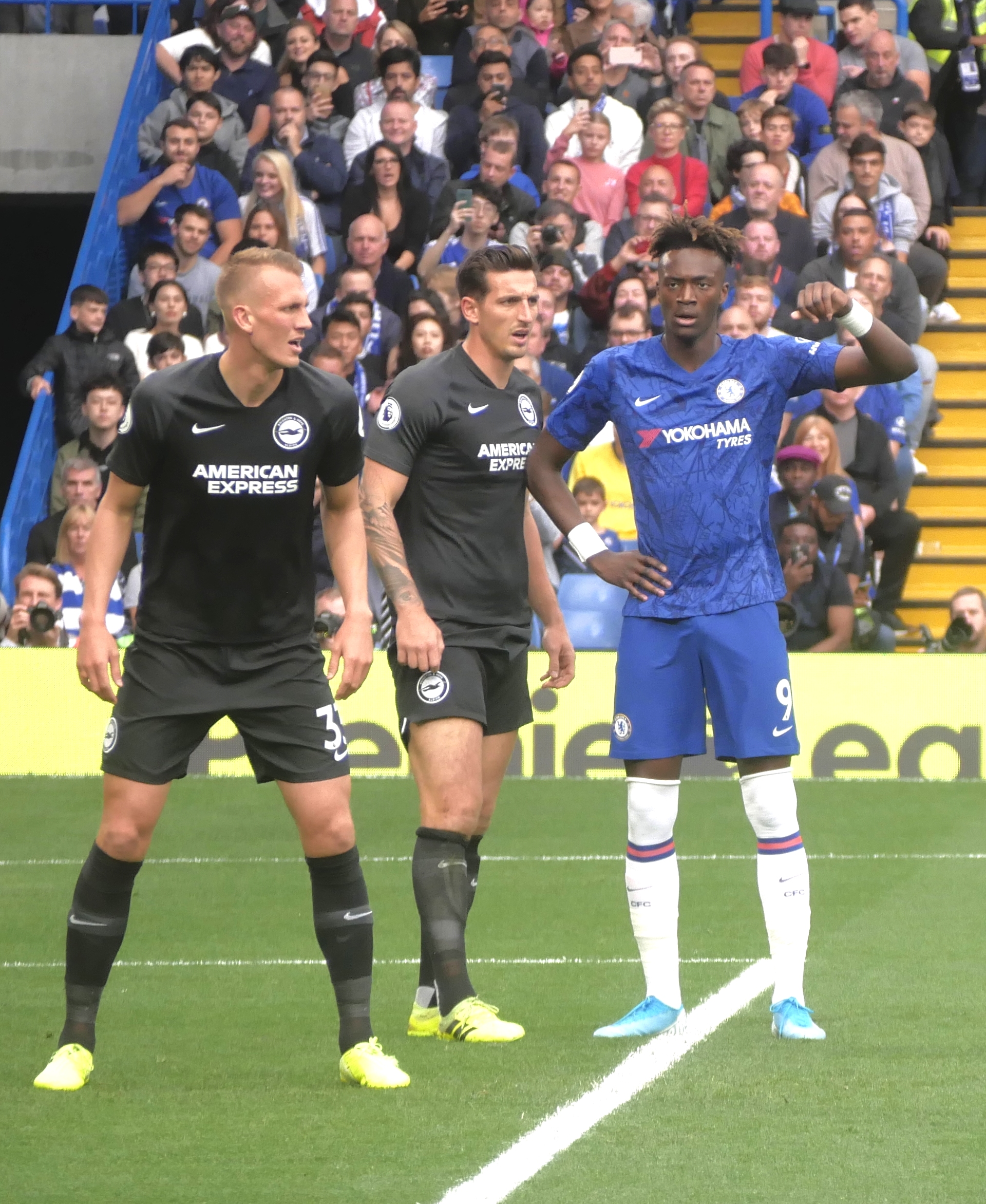
Burn (left) playing for Brighton & Hove Albion in 2019

Burn signed a four-year contract with Premier League club Brighton & Hove Albion on 9 August 2018 for an undisclosed fee. He was loaned back to Wigan Athletic until January 2019.

Burn returned to Brighton after his loan spell, and made his debut on 26 January in the FA Cup third-round tie against West Bromwich Albion; the match finished goalless, and Burn was named man of the match. He made two more starts, both in the FA Cup, and finally made his league debut for the club on the opening day of the 2019–20 season away to Watford, playing in a back three alongside Lewis Dunk and Shane Duffy; according to the Telegraph's report, he excelled as Albion won 3–0. He continued as a fixture in the starting eleven, and by the end of the year was the only Brighton player to play every minute of their Premier League campaign. On 1 January 2020, he fractured his collarbone in collision with Chelsea's Reece James. The injury required surgery, and he was able to return to action on 8 February.

On 2 January 2021, Burn scored an own goal, gave away a penalty and picked up a yellow card in a match where Brighton came from 3–1 behind to claim a vital point in a 3–3 home draw against Wolverhampton Wanderers. Burn played in Brighton's 1–0 away victory over defending champions Liverpool on 3 February claiming their first league win at Anfield since 1982. On 18 May 2021, with fans returning to football, Burn scored his first goal for Brighton in a 3–2 home league win over champions Manchester City, scoring the winner to seal the Seagulls' first top-flight win over City since 1981.

In the absence of Lewis Dunk, Shane Duffy, Pascal Groß and several others, Burn captained the Albion for the first time in the 1–0 home loss to Wolves on 15 December 2021. His second Albion goal, a back-post header away to Everton on 2 January 2022, doubled their lead in a match that they won 3–2.

=== Newcastle United ===
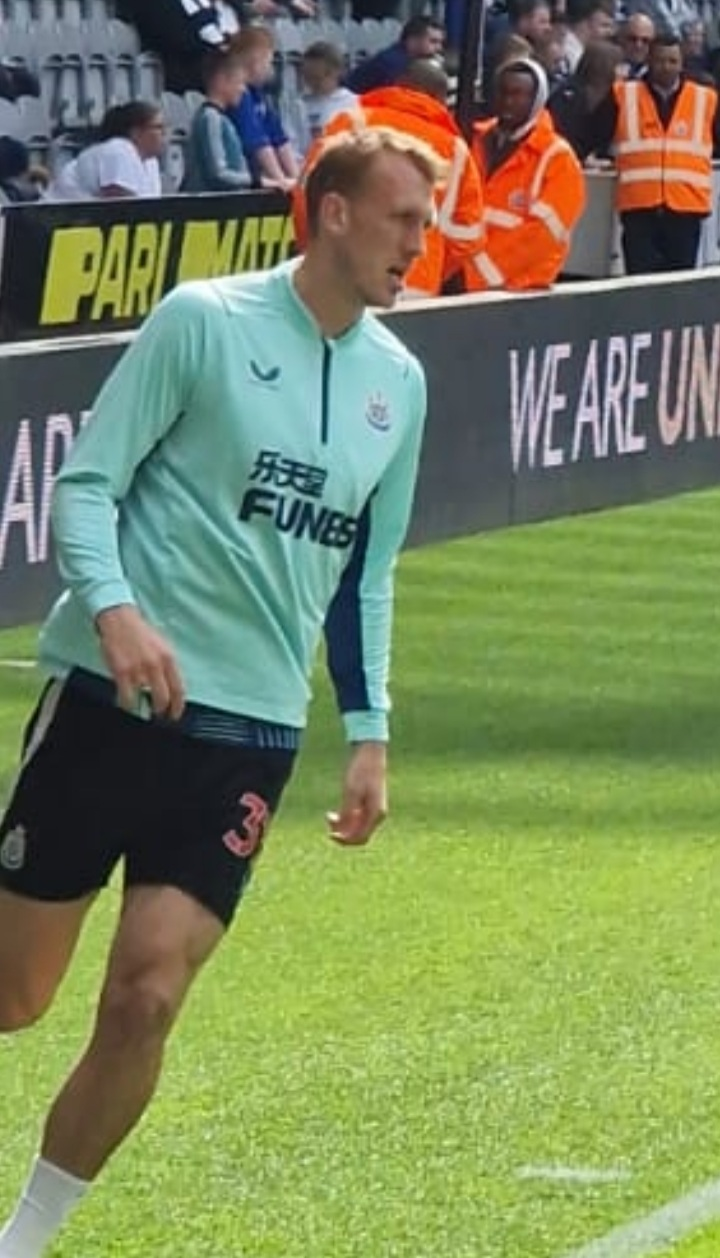
Burn with Newcastle United in 2023

On 28 January 2022, Brighton rejected a £7 million bid for Burn from Newcastle United, the club he supported and played for as a youngster. Two days later, a fee of £13 million was agreed, and Burn signed a two-and-a-half-year contract with Newcastle on 31 January. The fee was officially undisclosed. He made his debut on 13 February, partnering Fabian Schär at centre back in a 1–0 victory at home to Aston Villa, and was named as Sky Sports' Man of the Match. According to Gary Neville, "[Burn] was composed at the back and all of his work has been really good, particularly his headed clearances. I have not seen the Newcastle defence as organised as this for some time." On 10 March he assisted Bruno Guimarães for the winning goal against Southampton. Burn was an ever-present at centre-back, and in the 2022–23 season, continued to be so, while shifting onto the left-side, following the arrival of Sven Botman.

On 10 January 2023, Burn scored his first goal for Newcastle in a 2–0 win over Leicester City to progress to the semi-final of the EFL Cup. On 18 May, he scored his first Premier League goal for Newcastle, by netting the second goal in the club's 4–1 victory over Brighton. Later that year, on 4 October, he scored his first Champions League goal in a 4–1 victory over Paris Saint-Germain at St James' Park. On 13 October, Burn signed a two-year contract extension with Newcastle.

Burn recorded his first FA Cup goal for United on 27 January 2024, in a 2–0 victory against former team Fulham at Craven Cottage.

On 16 March 2025, Burn scored the opening goal with a towering header in the EFL Cup final which ended in a 2–1 win against Liverpool, contributing to his club's first domestic trophy since 1955. The goal was Newcastle's first at Wembley since the 1999–2000 FA Cup semi-final, and first goal in a final since their defeat in the 1976 Football League Cup final. After the game, Liverpool manager Arne Slot said "I've never seen in my life a player from that far away heading a ball with so much force into the far corner. Ninety-nine out of 100 times that will not lead to a goal. Credit to him, he's one of the few players that can score a goal from that distance with his head." Two months later, on 24 May, he extended his contract with the club until 2027. Later that year, on 15 August, he was named as club's captain ahead of the 2026–27 season.

== International career ==
On 14 March 2025, Burn was called up to new manager Thomas Tuchel's first England squad for World Cup qualifiers against Albania and Latvia. He made his international debut against Albania on 21 March, at 32 years old.

On 22 May 2026, Burn was selected in the 26-man squad for the 2026 FIFA World Cup. On 5 July, in the round of 16 knockout match against host nation Mexico, Burn came on as a substitute (in the 74th minute) to make his debut World Cup appearance. He was part of a robust England defence that saw out a 3–2 victory, with England spending the last 48 minutes of play down to 10 men, with Burn making a number of crucial defensive headers and blocks, and in doing so tying a record, that had stood since 1966, for most clearances by a substitute.

== Personal life ==
Burn was born in Blyth, Northumberland on 9 May 1992. He attended Blyth Community College (now The Blyth Academy) from 2006 to 2009 before studying for a sports diploma at Cramlington Learning Village's sixth form.

At age 13, Burn lost the ring finger on his right hand after severing it in an accident. He is married to Roz, a native of Cramlington, with whom he has two children.

In May 2025, Burn spoke about his struggles with mental health, as he had struggled particularly early in his career. In May 2026, he spoke positively about how therapy had helped him.

== Career statistics ==
=== Club ===
As of match played 29 October 2026

Appearances and goals by club, season and competition
Club	Season	League			FA Cup		League Cup		Europe		Other		Total	
Club	Season	Division	Apps	Goals	Apps	Goals	Apps	Goals	Apps	Goals	Apps	Goals	Apps	Goals
Darlington	2009–10	League Two	4	0	0	0	0	0	—		0	0	4	0
Darlington	2010–11	Conference Premier	10	0	0	0	—		—		5 (Note: Appearances in FA Trophy)	0	15	0
Darlington	Total		14	0	0	0	0	0	—		5	0	19	0
Fulham	2011–12	Premier League	0	0	0	0	0	0	—		—		0	0
Fulham	2012–13	Premier League	0	0	—		0	0	—		—		0	0
Fulham	2013–14	Premier League	9	0	3	0	—		—		—		12	0
Fulham	2014–15	Championship	20	1	0	0	2	1	—		—		22	2
Fulham	2015–16	Championship	32	0	1	0	2	0	—		—		35	0
Fulham	Total		61	1	4	0	4	1	—		0	0	69	2
Yeovil Town (loan)	2012–13	League One	34	2	1	0	—		—		6 (Note: Three appearances in Football League Trophy, three appearances and one goal in League One play-offs)	1	41	3
Birmingham City (loan)	2013–14	Championship	24	0	—		4	1	—		—		28	1
Wigan Athletic	2016–17	Championship	42	1	2	0	0	0	—		—		44	1
Wigan Athletic	2017–18	League One	45	5	8	1	0	0	—		0	0	53	6
Wigan Athletic	Total		87	6	10	1	0	0	—		0	0	97	7
Brighton & Hove Albion	2018–19	Premier League	0	0	3	0	—		—		—		3	0
Brighton & Hove Albion	2019–20	Premier League	34	0	0	0	0	0	—		—		34	0
Brighton & Hove Albion	2020–21	Premier League	27	1	2	0	3	0	—		—		32	1
Brighton & Hove Albion	2021–22	Premier League	13	1	1	0	2	0	—		—		16	1
Brighton & Hove Albion	Total		74	2	6	0	5	0	—		—		85	2
Wigan Athletic (loan)	2018–19	Championship	14	0	—		0	0	—		—		14	0
Newcastle United	2021–22	Premier League	16	0	—		—		—		—		16	0
Newcastle United	2022–23	Premier League	38	1	0	0	6	1	—		—		44	2
Newcastle United	2023–24	Premier League	33	2	4	1	2	0	4 (Note: Appearances in UEFA Champions League)	1	—		43	4
Newcastle United	2024–25	Premier League	37	1	2	0	7	1	—		—		46	2
Newcastle United	2025–26	Premier League	29	1	2	0	2	0	11	1	—		44	2
Newcastle United	2026–27	Premier League	3	0	0	0	1	1	—		—		4	1
Newcastle United	Total		156	5	8	1	18	3	15	2	—		197	11
Career total			464	16	29	2	31	5	15	2	11	1	550	26

=== International ===
As of match played 12 November 2026

Appearances and goals by national team and year
National team	Year	Apps	Goals
England	2025	5	0
England	2026	7	0
Total		12	0

== Honours ==
Yeovil Town

- Football League One play-offs: 2013

Wigan Athletic

- EFL League One: 2017–18

Newcastle United

- EFL Cup: 2024–25; runner-up: 2022–23

England

- FIFA World Cup third place: 2026

Individual

- PFA Team of the Year: 2017–18 League One
- Alan Hardaker Trophy: 2025
- Wigan Athletic Player of the Year: 2017
- Newcastle United Player of the Year: 2025
- Honorary Doctor of Civil Law, Northumbria University
