= 2013 Football League play-offs =

Football League play-offs
- Season: 2012–13
- Champions: Crystal Palace (Championship); Yeovil Town (League One); Bradford City (League Two)
- Matches: 15
- Goals: 36 (2.4 per match)
- Biggest home win: Watford 3–1 Leicester (Championship)
- Biggest away win: Burton 1–3 Bradford (League Two)
- Highest scoring: Brentford 3–3 Swindon (6 goals)
- Highest attendance: 82,025 – Crystal Palace v Watford (Championship Final)
- Lowest attendance: 5,955 – Cheltenham v Northampton (League Two semi-final)
- Average attendance: 23,077

The Football League play-offs for the 2012–13 season (referred to as the npower Football League Play-Offs for sponsorship reasons) were held in May 2013 with all finals being staged at Wembley Stadium in London.

The play-off semi-finals were played over two legs, contested by the teams who finished in 3rd, 4th, 5th and 6th place in the Football League Championship and League One and the 4th, 5th, 6th and 7th-placed teams in the League Two table. The winners of the semi-finals advanced to the finals, with the winner of the final gaining promotion for the following season.

== Background ==
The Football League play-offs have been held every year since 1987. They take place for each division following the conclusion of the regular season and are contested by the four clubs finishing below the automatic promotion places.

== Championship ==
| Pos | Team | Pld | W | D | L | GF | GA | GD | Pts |
|---|---|---|---|---|---|---|---|---|---|
| 3 | Watford | 46 | 23 | 8 | 15 | 85 | 58 | +27 | 77 |
| 4 | Brighton & Hove Albion | 46 | 19 | 18 | 9 | 69 | 43 | +26 | 75 |
| 5 | Crystal Palace | 46 | 19 | 15 | 12 | 73 | 62 | +11 | 72 |
| 6 | Leicester City | 46 | 19 | 11 | 16 | 71 | 48 | +23 | 68 |

Semi-finals
5 | Crystal Palace | 0 | 2 | 2
4 | Brighton & Hove Albion | 0 | 0 | 0
6 | Leicester City | 1 | 1 | 2
3 | Watford | 0 | 3 | 3

Final
5 | Crystal Palace | 1
3 | Watford | 0

=== Semi-finals ===
First leg

9 May 2013
19:45 BST

| Leicester City | 1–0 | Watford |
|---|---|---|
| Nugent 82' | Report |

King Power Stadium, Leicester
Attendance: 29,650
Referee: Neil Swarbrick
10 May 2013
19:45 BST

| Crystal Palace | 0–0 | Brighton & Hove Albion |
|---|---|---|
| | Report |

Selhurst Park, London
Attendance: 23,294
Referee: Michael Oliver

Second leg

12 May 2013
12:30 BST

| Watford | 3–1 | Leicester City |
|---|---|---|
| Vydra 15', 65'; Deeney 90+7' | Report | Nugent 19' |

Vicarage Road, Watford
Attendance: 16,142
Referee: Michael Oliver

Watford won 3–2 on aggregate.

13 May 2013
19:45 BST

| Brighton & Hove Albion | 0–2 | Crystal Palace |
|---|---|---|
| | Report | Zaha 69', 88' |

Falmer Stadium, Falmer
Attendance: 29,518
Referee: Mark Clattenburg

Crystal Palace won 2–0 on aggregate.

=== Final ===
27 May 2013
15:00 BST

| Crystal Palace | 1–0 (a.e.t.) | Watford |
|---|---|---|
| Phillips 105+1' (pen.) | Report |

Wembley Stadium, London
Attendance: 82,025
Referee: Martin Atkinson

== League One ==
| Pos | Team | Pld | W | D | L | GF | GA | GD | Pts |
|---|---|---|---|---|---|---|---|---|---|
| 3 | Brentford | 46 | 21 | 16 | 9 | 62 | 47 | +15 | 79 |
| 4 | Yeovil Town | 46 | 23 | 8 | 15 | 71 | 56 | +15 | 77 |
| 5 | Sheffield United | 46 | 19 | 18 | 9 | 56 | 42 | +14 | 75 |
| 6 | Swindon Town | 46 | 20 | 14 | 12 | 72 | 39 | +33 | 74 |

=== Semi-finals ===
First leg

3 May 2013
19:45 BST

| Sheffield United | 1–0 | Yeovil Town |
|---|---|---|
| McFadzean 46' | Report |

Bramall Lane, Sheffield
Attendance: 15,262
Referee: Stuart Attwell
4 May 2013
17:20 BST

| Swindon Town | 1–1 | Brentford |
|---|---|---|
| Luongo 70' | Report | O'Connor 90+4' (pen.) |

County Ground, Swindon
Attendance: 10,595
Referee: Geoff Eltringham

Second leg

6 May 2013
13:30 BST

| Yeovil Town | 2–0 | Sheffield United |
|---|---|---|
| Dawson 6'; Upson 85' | Report |

Huish Park, Yeovil
Attendance: 8,152
Referee: Phil Gibbs

Yeovil Town won 2–1 on aggregate.

6 May 2013
16:30 BST

| Brentford | 3–3 (a.e.t.) | Swindon Town |
|---|---|---|
| A. Rooney 24' (o.g.); Donaldson 40', 47' | Report | A. Rooney 44'; Devera 57'; Flint 90+5' |
Penalties
| Saunders (penalty scored); Hayes (penalty scored); Dean (penalty scored); Craig (penalty scored); Forshaw (penalty scored) | 5–4 | (penalty scored) Devera; (penalty scored) Flint; (penalty scored) Collins; (penalty missed) Storey; (penalty scored) Roberts |

Griffin Park, London
Attendance: 9,109
Referee: Nigel Miller

Brentford 4–4 Swindon Town on aggregate. Brentford won 5–4 on penalties.

=== Final ===
19 May 2013
13:30 BST

| Brentford | 1–2 | Yeovil Town |
|---|---|---|
| Dean 51' | Report | Madden 6'; Burn 42' |

Wembley Stadium, London
Attendance: 41,955
Referee: Andy D'Urso

== League Two ==
| Pos | Team | Pld | W | D | L | GF | GA | GD | Pts |
|---|---|---|---|---|---|---|---|---|---|
| 4 | Burton Albion | 46 | 22 | 10 | 14 | 71 | 65 | +6 | 76 |
| 5 | Cheltenham Town | 46 | 20 | 15 | 11 | 58 | 51 | +7 | 75 |
| 6 | Northampton Town | 46 | 21 | 10 | 15 | 64 | 55 | +9 | 73 |
| 7 | Bradford City | 46 | 18 | 15 | 13 | 63 | 52 | +11 | 69 |

=== Semi-finals ===
First leg

2 May 2013
19:45 BST

| Bradford City | 2–3 | Burton Albion |
|---|---|---|
| Wells 37' (pen.); Thompson 75' | Report | Zola 22', 27'; Weir 44' |

Coral Windows Stadium, Bradford
Attendance: 14,657
Referee: James Adcock
2 May 2013
19:45 BST

| Northampton Town | 1–0 | Cheltenham Town |
|---|---|---|
| O'Donovan 26' | Report |

Sixfields, Northampton
Attendance: 6,563
Referee: Mick Russell

Second leg

5 May 2013
12:00 BST

| Burton Albion | 1–3 | Bradford City |
|---|---|---|
| Maghoma 55' (pen.) | Report | Wells 27', 57'; Hanson 50' |

Pirelli Stadium, Burton upon Trent
Attendance: 6,148
Referee: Graham Scott

Bradford City won 5–4 on aggregate.

5 May 2013
18:45 BST

| Cheltenham Town | 0–1 | Northampton Town |
|---|---|---|
| | Report | Guttridge 28' |

Abbey Business Stadium, Cheltenham
Attendance: 5,955
Referee: Andrew Madley

Northampton Town won 2–0 on aggregate.

=== Final ===
18 May 2013
13:30

| Bradford City | 3–0 | Northampton Town |
|---|---|---|
| Hanson 15'; McArdle 19'; Wells 28' | Report |

Wembley Stadium, London
Attendance: 47,127
Referee: Keith Stroud
