= List of Yeovil Town F.C. internationals =

This is a list of all full international footballers to play for Yeovil Town. Players who were capped while a Yeovil Town player are marked in bold.

== International representatives ==
As of 3 November 2026

=== Former Yeovil Town players ===
Player	Nation	Caps	Goals	International years	Yeovil years
**Rhys Browne**	Antigua and Barbuda	13	2	2015–2023	2017–2019
Justin Cochrane	Antigua and Barbuda	14	2	2008–2012	2007–2008
Keiran Murtagh	Antigua and Barbuda	22	5	2010–2016	2008–2010
Dion Pereira	Antigua and Barbuda	13	2	2023–	2021
James Walker	Antigua and Barbuda	1	0	2012	2007–2008
**Sessi D'Almeida**	Benin	50	1	2014–	2018–2019
Asmir Begović	Bosnia and Herzegovina	63	0	2009–2020	2008
Daniel Barker	British Virgin Islands	5	0	2014–2016	2006–2007
Marc Bircham	Canada	17	1	1999–2004	2007–2009
Gavin McCallum	Canada	1	1	2010	2004–2007
Jaime Peters	Canada	26	1	2004–2011	2008
**Josh Wagenaar**	Canada	4	0	2006–2010	2008–2009
Kelly Youga	Central African Republic	15	0	2012–2016	2012
**Marek Štěch**	Czech Republic	1	0	2014	2011, 2012–2014
Anthony Georgiou	Cyprus	8	0	2018–2019	2022
Jean-Paul Kalala	DR Congo	7	0	2002–2006	2006–2007, 2009–2011
Christian Maghoma	DR Congo	1	0	2017	2015–2016
Dan Burn	England	11	0	2025–	2012-13
Steven Caulker	England	1	1	2012	2009–2010
Steven Caulker	Sierra Leone	18	0	2022–2024	2009–2010
Sam Johnstone	England	4	0	2021–2023	2013
Ryan Mason	England	1	0	2015	2009–2010
Alex McCarthy	England	1	0	2018	2009–2010
Louis Page	England	7	1	1927	1933–1935
Dick Pym	England	3	0	1925–1926	1931–1932
Kevin Reeves	England	2	0	1979–1980	1985
Graham Roberts	England	6	0	1983–1984	1995–1998
Andros Townsend	England	13	3	2013–2016	2009
Kwesi Appiah	Ghana	7	2	2015–2019	2012
Kim Grant	Ghana	7	1	1996–1997	2001–2003
Lloyd Owusu	Ghana	2	0	2005–2006	2007–2008
Matt Cafer	Gibraltar	2	0	2018–2019	2011–2013
Antonio German	Grenada	9	1	2018–2021	2011
Myles Hippolyte	Grenada	14	6	2023–	2019–2020
Craig Rocastle	Grenada	12	1	2010–2012	2006
Flavien Belson	Guadeloupe	4	0	2010	2011
Stéphane Zubar	Guadeloupe	2	0	2011	2017
Callum Harriott	Guyana	9	1	2019–2021	2023
Keanu Marsh-Brown	Guyana	16	1	2019–2021	2012–2013
Zoltán Stieber	Hungary	26	3	2011–2018	2007–2008
Dillon Barnes	Jamaica	1	0	2021	2022
Miguel Freckleton	Jamaica	3	0	2026–	2023
**Joel Grant**	Jamaica	14	2	2014–2016	2013–2015
Daniel Johnson	Jamaica	27	3	2020–2024	2012
Jermaine Johnson	Jamaica	73	12	2001–2014	2003
Jamar Loza	Jamaica	4	0	2014	2015
Delano McCoy-Splatt	Jamaica	1	0	2023	2026
Nathan Smith	Jamaica	2	0	2011–2012	2008–2011, 2014–2018
**Andrejs Štolcers**	Latvia	81	7	1994–2005	2004–2005
Vitālijs Maksimenko	Latvia	54	1	2013–2024	2013
Paulius Golubickas	Lithuania	39	2	2019–	2016–2018
**Enes Mahmutović**	Luxembourg	46	0	2016–	2018–2019
Hong Wan	Malaysia	1	0	2026–	2017–2019
Abdoulaye Demba	Mali	7	1	2003–2006	2002–2003
Yoann Arquin	Martinique	17	4	2013–2017	2018–2019
Nicolas Mirza	Martinique	3	0	2012	2004–2005
Rohan Ince	Montserrat	5	1	2021	2012
Rory Fallon	New Zealand	24	6	2009–2017	2005, 2011
Tony Levy	New Zealand	6	0	1988–1989	1980
Francis Kumbur	Nigeria	1	0	2002	2002
Gabriel Osho	Nigeria	2	0	2024–	2019–2020, 2020–2021
Efe Sodje	Nigeria	9	1	2000–2004	2005–2006
Tommy Doherty	Northern Ireland	9	0	2003–2005	2006
Andy Kirk	Northern Ireland	11	0	2000–2010	2008
John McClelland	Northern Ireland	53	1	1980–1990	1994–1996
Michael Smith	Northern Ireland	19	1	2016–2021	2023–2025
Ivan Sproule	Northern Ireland	11	1	2005–2007	2010
Eric Welsh	Northern Ireland	4	1	1966–1967	1976–1977
Otis Khan	Pakistan	15	0	2023–	2016–2018, 2025
Leon Best	Republic of Ireland	7	0	2009–2010	2006–2007
Shane Duffy	Republic of Ireland	61	7	2014–2024	2013–2014
Fred Kiernan	Republic of Ireland	5	0	1951–1952	1956–1958
**Paddy Madden**	Republic of Ireland	1	0	2013	2012–2014
Alan O'Brien	Republic of Ireland	5	0	2006–2007	2011–2012
Marc Wilson	Republic of Ireland	25	1	2011–2016	2006
Alex Dobre	Romania	7	0	2023–	2019
Liam Bridcutt	Scotland	2	0	2013–2016	2008
Stephen Kingsley	Scotland	2	0	2016–2022	2015
Jamie McAllister	Scotland	1	0	2004	2012–2014
John McGinlay	Scotland	13	4	1994–1997	1985–1988
George Paterson	Scotland	1	0	1938	1949–1951
Kevin Betsy	Seychelles	7	1	2011	2007
Abdulai Bell-Baggie	Sierra Leone	5	0	2013–2014	2011–2012
Aleksandar Prijović	Serbia	13	2	2017–2019	2009
**Adi Yussuf**	Tanzania	4	0	2019–2022	2021–2022
**Bevis Mugabi**	Uganda	28	1	2018–	2016–2019
Duane Holmes	United States	2	0	2019	2014
Les Boulter	Wales	1	1	1939	1947–1948
Simon Church	Wales	38	3	2009–2016	2007
Andrew Crofts	Wales	29	0	2005–2017	2019
**Arron Davies**	Wales	1	0	2006	2004–2007, 2010
Craig Davies	Wales	7	0	2005–2013	2009
Cyril Davies	Wales	1	0	1971	1969–1970
Ryan Hedges	Wales	3	0	2017–2019	2016–2017
**Wayne Hennessey**	Wales	109	0	2007–2023	2013
Barrie Jones	Wales	15	2	1962–1969	1971–1972
Tom Lawrence	Wales	23	3	2015–2021	2014
Wilf Lewis	Wales	6	3	1927–1929	1932–1933
**Shaun MacDonald**	Wales	4	0	2010–2016	2009–2011
Kieffer Moore	Wales	56	15	2019–	2013–2015
Howard Pritchard	Wales	1	0	1985	1990–1992
Connor Roberts	Wales	65	3	2018–	2015–2016
Josh Sheehan	Wales	22	0	2020–	2015, 2015–2016
Nigel Stevenson	Wales	1	0	1982	1990–1991
George Thomas	Wales	3	0	2018–2019	2015
Owain Tudur Jones	Wales	7	0	2008–2013	2010
Gavin Williams	Wales	2	0	2005	2002–2004, 2010, 2011–2013
