= Flavien Belson =

French footballer (born 1987)

Personal information
- Full name: Flavien Belson Bengaber
- Date of birth: 22 February 1987 (age 39)
- Place of birth: Sainte-Adresse, France
- Height: 1.87 m (6 ft 2 in)
- Position: Defensive midfielder

Youth career
- 2003–2006: Metz

Senior career*
Years	Team	Apps	(Gls)
2004–2006	Metz B	12	(1)
2006–2008	Metz	10	(0)
2008–2009	Milton Keynes Dons	13	(0)
2009–2010	Metz B	7	(2)
2010	Cannes	3	(0)
2011	Dives-Cabourg	8	(0)
2011–2012	Yeovil Town	1	(0)
2012–2013	Amiens SC	6	(0)
2013–2015	Stade Bordelais	27	(0)
Total		87	(3)

International career^{‡}
2003	France U17	9	(1)
2010	Guadeloupe	4	(0)
- * Club domestic league appearances and goals ‡ National team caps and goals as of 14:41, 24 September 2011 (UTC)

Flavien Belson Bengaber (born 22 February 1987) is a French former professional international footballer who played as a defensive midfielder. At international level, he represented Guadeloupe.

== Career ==
Belson was born in Sainte-Adresse. He previously played for English club Milton Keynes Dons, but was released following the 2008–09 season. After leaving the English club, he played on the reserve team of his former club Metz before joining Cannes in 2010. After featuring with Cannes in three matches, Belson was released from the club. He went on a trial with Red Star Saint-Ouen before joining his Dives in January 2011.

On 16 September 2011, Belson signed for League One club Yeovil Town on a short-term contract until January 2012, and he made his début in a 3–0 loss against Carlisle United but received a first-half red card after a second bookable offence. Belson was released following just the one appearance at the end of his contract in early January 2012 along with Abdulai Bell-Baggie, Alan O'Brien and Kerrea Gilbert.

== Career statistics ==
As of 18 November 2018

Club	Season	League			National Cup		League Cup		Other		Total	
Club	Season	Division	Apps	Goals	Apps	Goals	Apps	Goals	Apps	Goals	Apps	Goals
Metz B	2004–05	CFA	12	1	1	0	0	0	—		13	1
Metz	2005–06	Ligue 1	4	0	0	0	0	0	—		4	0
Metz	2006–07	Ligue 2	0	0	1	0	0	0	—		1	0
Metz	2007–08	Ligue 1	6	0	0	0	0	0	—		6	0
Metz	Total		10	0	1	0	0	0	—		11	0
Milton Keynes Dons	2008–09	League One	13	0	1	0	0	0	1	0	15	0
Metz B	2009–10	CFA 2	7	2	0	0	0	0	—		7	2
Cannes	2009–10	Championnat National	3	0	0	0	0	0	—		3	0
Dives-Cabourg	2010–11	CFA 2	8	0	0	0	0	0	—		8	0
Yeovil Town	2011–12	League One	1	0	0	0	0	0	0	0	1	0
Amiens	2012–13	Championnat National	6	0	0	0	0	0	—		6	0
Stade Bordelais	2013–14	CFA	8	0	0	0	0	0	—		8	0
Stade Bordelais	2014–15	CFA	19	0	0	0	0	0	—		19	0
Stade Bordelais	Total		27	0	0	0	0	0	—		27	0
Career total			87	3	3	0	0	0	1	0	91	3
