= 2011–12 Yeovil Town F.C. season =

Yeovil Town
2011–12 season
- Chairman: John Fry
- Manager: Terry Skiverton (until 9 January); Gary Johnson
- Stadium: Huish Park
- League One: 17th
- FA Cup: Second Round Replay
- League Cup: First Round
- FL Trophy: Second Round
- Top goalscorer: League: Andy Williams (16); All: Andy Williams (17)
- Highest home attendance: 5,635 (19 November vs. Exeter City, League One)
- Lowest home attendance: 3,121 (25 October vs. Leyton Orient, League One)
- Average home league attendance: 3,984
Home colours	Away colours	Third colours

The 2011–12 Yeovil Town F.C. season was Yeovil Town's 9th season in the Football League and their seventh consecutive season in League One and saw them finish 17th with 54 points.

== Key events ==
- 15 April: Trio of second year youth team scholars Rhys Baggridge, Robert Clowes and Lewis Clarke are offered professional contracts for the new season.
- 5 May: Craig Calver, Martin Gritton, Stefan Stam and Sam Williams reach the end of their contracts and are released.
- 1 June: Andy Welsh rejects his contract offer and signs for League One rivals Carlisle United.
- 10 June: The club announce that Dean Bowditch has rejected the offer of a new contract.
- 13 June: Adam Virgo rejects terms on a new contract offer and therefore will not return for the new season.
- 15 June: Welsh international midfielder Gavin Williams returns to Yeovil following his release by Bristol Rovers.
- 16 June: Nathan Smith rejects a new contract deal and moves to newly promoted side Chesterfield.
- 22 June: After using Twitter as a scouting tool Skiverton hails the first "twansfer" and signs former Everton striker Kieran Agard on a one-year deal.
- 28 June: Billy Gibson agrees terms on a new one-year contract while Alex Russell has rejected his offer and leaves the club.
- 4 July: Centre-back Bondz N'Gala signs on a free transfer from Plymouth Argyle as Yeovil's third new signing of the season.
- 7 July: Craig Alcock completes his move to Championship side Peterborough United signing a three-year contract with Yeovil receiving an undisclosed fee as compensation due to Alcock being under 24 years of age.
- 14 July: Former Bristol Rovers midfielder Dominic Blizzard signs on a one-year contract subject to a medical.
- 15 July: Yeovil complete their fifth signing of the summer, the former West Ham United midfielder Anthony Edgar on a two-year contract.
- 16 July: Young German defender Max Ehmer rejoins on a six-month youth loan deal.
- 26 July: Former Cardiff City striker Steve MacLean signs a one-year contract with the club.
- 27 July: Following the withdrawal of sponsorship for the East Stand, formerly the Cowlin Stand, the Home Terrace has a new sponsor in Thatchers Cider and will now be known as 'The Thatchers Gold Stand'.
- 28 July: England U19 goalkeeper Jed Steer arrives on a three-month youth loan deal from Norwich City.
- 4 August: Tottenham Hotspur striker Jonathan Obika resigns on a six-month loan to January 2012.
- 8 August: Former Arsenal full back Kerrea Gilbert and former Reading winger Abdulai Bell-Baggie sign on short-term contracts.
- 12 August: Irish international winger Alan O'Brien signs on a short-term contract making him Yeovil's fifteenth signing of the summer.
- 16 September: Guadeloupe international midfielder Flavien Belson joins Yeovil on a short-term deal.
- 4 January: Belson, Bell-Baggie, Gilbert and O'Brien are all released at the end of their short-term contracts.
- 9 January: With Yeovil lying in 21st place in the league with just 21 points from their first 24 matches, former manager Gary Johnson returns to the club for a second stint as manager, with Terry Skiverton becoming Johnson's assistant.
- 12 January: Captain Paul Wotton is released and rejoins Plymouth Argyle and is replaced by Paul Huntington as captain with Luke Ayling being appointed vice-captain.
- 2 February: Following the suspension of captain Paul Huntington, Richard Hinds is signed on a short-term contract as cover.
- 21 April: With two matches to spare of the season Yeovil confirmed their League One status with a 2–2 draw against Leyton Orient by reaching 51 points.
- 27 April: The four remaining second year youth team scholars are released at the end of their scholarships with none being offered professional terms.
- 3 May: Billy Gibson along with all three first year professionals Lewis Clarke, Robert Clowes and Rhys Baggridge are all released with immediate effect.
- 5 May: Gary Johnson announces that midfielder Ed Upson has agreed a new two-year deal.
- 8 May: Former Wales international Gavin Williams agrees a new one-year contract extension.
- 11 May: Vice-captain Luke Ayling signs a new two-year contract.
- 15 May: The club announces that top scorer Andy Williams has rejected the clubs offer of a new contract and approaches for former Middlesbrough loan duo Jonathan Grounds and Jonathan Franks had been unsuccessful.
- 18 May: Midfielder Dominic Blizzard signs a new one-year contract.
- 22 May: Club-captain Paul Huntington rejects the offer of a new contract and signs for Preston North End.

== Club ==
=== Coaching staff ===
Until 9 January 2012

Position	Staff
Manager	Terry Skiverton
Assistant manager	Nathan Jones
Technical coach	Darren Way
Goalkeeping coach	Gareth Stewart
Physiotherapist	Mike Micciche
Physiotherapist	Phil Cole

Last updated: 24 September 2011
Source: Yeovil Town F.C.

After 9 January 2012

Position	Staff
Manager	Gary Johnson
Assistant manager	Terry Skiverton
First team coach	Nathan Jones
Technical coach	Darren Way
Goalkeeping coach	Gareth Stewart
Physiotherapist	Mike Micciche
Physiotherapist	Phil Cole

Last updated: 9 January 2012
Source: Yeovil Town F.C.

=== Kit ===
Supplier: Vandanel
Sponsor(s): Jones Building Contractors

Home	Away	Third

Source: Historical Football Kits

== Playing staff ==
=== First team ===
- Statistics include only competitive appearances and goals.
- Age given is at the start of Yeovil's first match of the season (6 August 2011).

No.	Name	Nat.	Place of birth	Date of birth	Position	Club apps.	Club goals	Int. caps	Int. goals	Previous club	Date joined	Contract expiry	Notes
1	Sam Walker	(England)	Gravesend	2 October 1991 (aged 19)	GK	20	0	–	–	Chelsea	19 January 2012	n/a	on loan from Chelsea
2	Luke Ayling	(England)	Lambeth	25 August 1991 (aged 19)	DF, MF	92	0	–	–	Arsenal	17 March 2010	June 2014	Vice-captain
3	Nathan Jones	(Wales)	Rhondda	28 May 1973 (aged 38)	DF	211	2	–	–	Brighton & Hove Albion	28 June 2005	June 2013
4	Bondz N'Gala	(England)	Forest Gate	13 September 1989 (aged 21)	DF	35	2	–	–	Plymouth Argyle	4 July 2011	June 2013
5	Paul Huntington	(England)	Carlisle	17 September 1987 (aged 23)	DF	85	6	–	–	Stockport County	16 July 2010	June 2012	Captain
6	Dominic Blizzard	(England)	High Wycombe	2 September 1983 (aged 27)	MF	32	4	–	–	Bristol Rovers	14 July 2011	June 2013
7	Andy Williams	(England)	Hereford	14 August 1986 (aged 24)	FW, MF	79	25	–	–	Bristol Rovers	1 July 2010	June 2012
8	Ed Upson	(England)	Bury St Edmunds	21 November 1989 (aged 21)	MF	68	6	–	–	Ipswich Town	2 July 2010	June 2014
10	Gavin Williams	(Wales)	Merthyr Tydfil	20 July 1980 (aged 31)	MF	160	31	2	0	Bristol Rovers	1 July 2011	June 2013
11	Anthony Edgar	(England)	Newham	30 September 1990 (aged 20)	MF	12	1	–	–	West Ham United	15 July 2011	June 2013
12	Michael Woods	(England)	Pocklington	6 April 1990 (aged 21)	MF	5	1	–	–	Chelsea	23 February 2012	June 2012
14	Lawson D'Ath	(England)	Oxford	24 December 1992 (aged 18)	MF	14	1	–	–	Reading	9 February 2012	n/a	on loan from Reading
15	Josh Morris	(England)	Preston	30 September 1991 (aged 19)	DF, MF	5	0	–	–	Blackburn Rovers	22 March 2012	n/a	on loan from Blackburn Rovers
16	Jonathan Franks	(England)	Stockton-on-Tees	8 April 1990 (aged 21)	FW, MF	14	3	–	–	Middlesbrough	22 February 2012	n/a	on loan from Middlesbrough
17	Jonathan Grounds	(England)	Thornaby-on-Tees	2 February 1988 (aged 23)	DF, MF	14	0	–	–	Middlesbrough	22 February 2012	n/a	on loan from Middlesbrough
18	Kieran Agard	(England)	Newham	10 October 1989 (aged 21)	FW	34	6	–	–	Everton	1 July 2011	June 2012
19	Curtis Haynes-Brown	(England)	Ipswich	15 April 1989 (aged 22)	DF	12	0	–	–	Lowestoft Town	25 July 2011	June 2013
24	Gareth Stewart	(England)	Preston	3 February 1980 (aged 31)	GK	4	0	–	–	Welling United	23 March 2011	Undisclosed
28	Richard Hinds	(England)	Sheffield	22 August 1980 (aged 30)	DF	16	1	–	–	Lincoln City	2 February 2012	June 2013
29	Jonathan Obika	(England)	Enfield	12 September 1990 (aged 20)	FW	74	18	–	–	Tottenham Hotspur	4 August 2011	n/a	on loan from Tottenham Hotspur
Players who have appeared in Yeovil Town's squad but are away from the club on loan:
9	Steve MacLean	(Scotland)	Edinburgh	23 August 1982 (aged 28)	FW	24	4	–	–	Plymouth Argyle	26 July 2011	June 2012	on loan at Cheltenham Town
Players who have appeared in Yeovil Town's squad this season but who are no longer at the club:
	Rory Fallon	(New Zealand)	Gisborne	20 March 1982 (aged 29)	FW	12	1	11	3	Plymouth Argyle	2 August 2011	September 2011
	Jed Steer	(England)	Norwich	23 September 1992 (aged 18)	GK	14	0	–	–	Norwich City	28 July 2011	n/a	on loan from Norwich City
	Marek Štěch	(Czech Republic)	Prague	28 January 1990 (aged 21)	GK	5	0	–	–	West Ham United	14 October 2011	n/a	on loan from West Ham United
	Darren Purse	(England)	Stepney	14 February 1977 (aged 34)	DF	5	0	–	–	Millwall	21 October 2011	n/a	on loan from Millwall
	Oli Johnson	(England)	Wakefield	6 November 1987 (aged 23)	FW	26	3	–	–	Norwich City	26 September 2011	n/a	on loan from Norwich City
	Conor Clifford	(Republic of Ireland)	Dublin	1 October 1991 (aged 19)	MF	9	1	–	–	Chelsea	4 November 2011	n/a	on loan from Chelsea
	Abdulai Bell-Baggie	(England)	Sierra Leone	28 April 1992 (aged 19)	MF, FW	0	0	–	–	Reading	8 August 2011	January 2012
	Flavien Belson	(Guadeloupe)	(France) Sainte-Adresse	22 February 1987 (aged 24)	MF	1	0	4	0	SU Dives	16 September 2011	January 2012
	Kerrea Gilbert	(England)	Hammersmith	28 August 1987 (aged 23)	DF	9	0	–	–	Portland Timbers	8 August 2011	January 2012
	Alan O'Brien	(Republic of Ireland)	Dublin	20 February 1985 (aged 26)	MF	15	0	5	0	Swindon Town	12 August 2011	January 2012
	Paul Wotton	(England)	Plymouth	17 August 1977 (aged 33)	MF, DF	50	4	–	–	Southampton	1 January 2011	January 2012
	Gavin Massey	(England)	Watford	4 October 1992 (aged 18)	FW	17	3	–	–	Watford	12 September 2011	n/a	on loan from Watford
	Rene Gilmartin	(Republic of Ireland)	Dublin	31 May 1987 (aged 24)	GK	8	0	–	–	Watford	23 November 2011	n/a	on loan from Watford
	Max Ehmer	(Germany)	Frankfurt	3 February 1992 (aged 19)	DF, MF	55	1	–	–	Queens Park Rangers	1 January 2011	n/a	on loan from Queens Park Rangers
	Ryan Dickson	(England)	Saltash	14 December 1986 (aged 24)	DF, MF	5	1	–	–	Southampton	6 January 2012	n/a	on loan from Southampton
	Joe Edwards	(England)	Gloucester	31 October 1990 (aged 20)	DF, MF	4	1	–	–	Bristol City	12 January 2012	n/a	on loan from Bristol City
	Dean Parrett	(England)	Hampstead	16 November 1991 (aged 19)	MF	10	1	–	–	Tottenham Hotspur	13 January 2012	n/a	on loan from Tottenham Hotspur
	Kelly Youga	(Central African Republic)	Bangui	22 September 1985 (aged 25)	DF	1	0	–	–	Charlton Athletic	19 January 2012	June 2012
	Alistair Slowe	(England)	Brighton	16 October 1988 (aged 22)	DF, MF	0	0	–	–	Northampton Town	2 August 2011	Undisclosed
	Billy Gibson	(England)	Havering	30 September 1990 (aged 20)	MF	13	0	–	–	Watford	20 August 2010	June 2012
	Lewis Clarke	(England)	Weymouth	8 March 1993 (aged 18)	MF, DF	0	0	–	–	Trainee	15 April 2011	June 2012
	Robert Clowes	(England)	Croydon	24 February 1993 (aged 18)	FW	0	0	–	–	Trainee	15 April 2011	June 2012
	Rhys Baggridge	(Wales)	Neath	14 October 1992 (aged 18)	DF	0	0	–	–	Trainee	15 April 2011	June 2012

=== Contract extensions ===
Name	Status	Contract length	Expiry date	Ref
Gavin Williams	Signed	1 year	June 2013	
Ed Upson	Signed	2 years	June 2014	
Luke Ayling	Signed	2 years	June 2014	
Andy Williams	Rejected	Undisclosed	June 2012	
Dominic Blizzard	Signed	1 year	June 2013	
Paul Huntington	Rejected	Undisclosed	June 2012	
Richard Hinds	Signed	1 year	June 2013	

=== Youth team scholars ===
Note: Flags indicate national team as defined under FIFA eligibility rules; some limited exceptions apply. Players may hold more than one non-FIFA nationality.

No.	Pos.	Nation	Player
30	FW	ENG	Lloyd Matthews
36	DF	ENG	Mitch Brundle
41	GK	ENG	Matt Cafer
—	DF	WAL	Josh Doyle
—	DF	ENG	Taran Singh Jheeta
—	DF	ENG	Lee Sweet

No.	Pos.	Nation	Player
—	MF	ENG	Will Agbo
—	MF	ENG	Aidan Chainey
—	MF	ENG	Will Gordon
—	MF	ENG	Jonny Kaye
—	FW	ENG	Adam Cleary
—	FW	ENG	Melchi Emanuel-Williamson

== Transfers ==
=== In ===
Date	Name	From	Fee	Ref
1 July 2011	Kieran Agard	Everton	Free (released)	
1 July 2011	Gavin Williams	Bristol Rovers	Free (released)	
4 July 2011	Bondz N'Gala	Plymouth Argyle	Free	
14 July 2011	Dominic Blizzard	Bristol Rovers	Free (released)	
15 July 2011	Anthony Edgar	West Ham United	Free (released)	
25 July 2011	Curtis Haynes-Brown	Lowestoft Town	Undisclosed	
26 July 2011	Steve MacLean	Plymouth Argyle	Free (released)	
2 August 2011	Rory Fallon	Plymouth Argyle	Free (released)	
2 August 2011	Alistair Slowe	Northampton Town	Free (released)	
8 August 2011	Abdulai Bell-Baggie	Reading	Free (released)	
8 August 2011	Kerrea Gilbert	Portland Timbers	Free	
12 August 2011	Alan O'Brien	Swindon Town	Free (released)	
16 September 2011	Flavien Belson	SU Dives	Free	
19 January 2012	Kelly Youga	Charlton Athletic	Free (released)	
2 February 2012	Richard Hinds	Lincoln City	Free (released)	
23 February 2012	Michael Woods	Chelsea	Free (released)	

=== Out ===
Date	Name	To	Fee	Ref
7 July 2011	Craig Alcock	Peterborough United	Rejected new contract/Undisclosed compensation	
1 September 2011	Rory Fallon	Aberdeen	Released	
4 January 2012	Abdulai Bell-Baggie	Hayes & Yeading United	Released	
4 January 2012	Flavien Belson	Amiens	Released	
4 January 2012	Kerrea Gilbert	Shamrock Rovers	Released	
4 January 2012	Alan O'Brien	Gateshead	Released	
12 January 2012	Paul Wotton	Plymouth Argyle	Released	
31 March 2012	Kelly Youga	Ipswich Town	Contract terminated by mutual consent	
April 2012	Alistair Slowe	Ayia Napa	Released	
3 May 2012	Rhys Baggridge	Salisbury City	Released	
3 May 2012	Lewis Clarke	Weymouth	Released	
3 May 2012	Robert Clowes	Bridgwater Town	Released	
3 May 2012	Billy Gibson	Cambridge United	Released	
1 June 2012	Nathan Jones	Charlton Athletic	Contract terminated by mutual consent	
30 June 2012	Michael Woods	Doncaster Rovers	Released	
30 June 2012	Steve MacLean	St Johnstone	Released	
30 June 2012	Kieran Agard	Rotherham United	Released	
30 June 2012	Paul Huntington	Preston North End	Rejected new contract	
30 June 2012	Andy Williams	Swindon Town	Rejected new contract	

=== Loan in ===
Date	Name	From	End date	Ref
21 July 2011	Max Ehmer	Queens Park Rangers	19 January 2012	
28 July 2011	Jed Steer	Norwich City	13 October 2011	
4 August 2011	Jonathan Obika	Tottenham Hotspur	6 May 2012	
12 September 2011	Gavin Massey	Watford	12 January 2012	
26 September 2011	Oli Johnson	Norwich City	27 December 2011	
14 October 2011	Marek Štěch	West Ham United	14 November 2011	
21 October 2011	Darren Purse	Millwall	21 November 2011	
4 November 2011	Conor Clifford	Chelsea	3 January 2012	
23 November 2011	Rene Gilmartin	Watford	18 January 2012	
6 January 2012	Ryan Dickson	Southampton	8 February 2012	
12 January 2012	Joe Edwards	Bristol City	12 February 2012	
13 January 2012	Dean Parrett	Tottenham Hotspur	26 March 2012	
19 January 2012	Sam Walker	Chelsea	6 May 2012	
9 February 2012	Lawson D'Ath	Reading	6 May 2012	
22 February 2012	Jonathan Franks	Middlesbrough	6 May 2012	
22 February 2012	Jonathan Grounds	Middlesbrough	6 May 2012	
22 March 2012	Josh Morris	Blackburn Rovers	6 May 2012	

=== Loan out ===
Date	Name	To	End date	Ref
8 September 2011	Rhys Baggridge	Gillingham Town	19 October 2011	
5 October 2011	Lewis Clarke	Poole Town	10 November 2011	
15 October 2011	Josh Doyle	Weymouth	22 November 2011	
10 November 2011	Robert Clowes	Wimborne Town	10 December 2011	
16 December 2011	Rhys Baggridge	Poole Town	13 March 2012	
7 January 2012	Lloyd Matthews	Frome Town	16 April 2012	
24 January 2012	Robert Clowes	Bridgwater Town	26 March 2012	
27 January 2012	Lewis Clarke	Weymouth	27 March 2012	
19 March 2012	Rhys Baggridge	Weymouth	28 April 2012	
22 March 2012	Billy Gibson	Braintree Town	28 April 2012	
22 March 2012	Steve MacLean	Cheltenham Town	27 May 2012	

== Match results ==
League positions are sourced from Statto, while the remaining contents of each table are sourced from the references in the "Ref" column.

=== League One ===
Date	League position	Opponents	Venue	Result	Score F–A	Scorers	Attendance	Ref
6 August 2011	22nd	Brentford	A	L	0–2		6,278	
13 August 2011	8th	Oldham Athletic	H	W	3–1	Upson, A. Williams, Wotton (pen)	3,237	
16 August 2011	17th	Milton Keynes Dons	H	L	0–1		3,274	
20 August 2011	18th	Walsall	A	D	1–1	G. Williams	4,247	
27 August 2011	18th	Sheffield United	H	L	0–1		3,274	
3 September 2011	17th	Tranmere Rovers	A	D	0–0		5,037	
9 September 2011	17th	Preston North End	A	L	3–4	Edgar, MacLean (2, 1 pen)	11,474	
13 September 2011	16th	Wycombe Wanderers	H	W	1–0	Upson	3,134	
17 September 2011	18th	Sheffield Wednesday	H	L	2–3	Agard (2)	4,445	
24 September 2011	19th	Scunthorpe United	A	L	1–2	Wotton (pen)	4,086	
1 October 2011	21st	Bury	H	L	1–3	Agard	3,127	
8 October 2011	21st	Colchester United	A	D	2–2	Massey (2)	3,521	
15 October 2011	23rd	Carlisle United	H	L	0–3		3,673	
22 October 2011	24th	Stevenage	A	D	0–0		3,036	
25 October 2011	24th	Leyton Orient	H	D	2–2	Agard, N'Gala	3,121	
29 October 2011	24th	Huddersfield Town	H	L	0–1		3,486	
5 November 2011	24th	Chesterfield	A	D	2–2	Massey, Allott (og)	5,882	
19 November 2011	22nd	Exeter City	H	D	2–2	Upson, Blizzard	5,635	
26 November 2011	22nd	Hartlepool United	A	W	1–0	N'Gala	4,604	
10 December 2011	19th	Notts County	H	W	1–0	A. Williams	3,663	
17 December 2011	19th	Rochdale	A	D	0–0		2,692	
26 December 2011	21st	Charlton Athletic	H	L	2–3	Obika, Huntington	4,977	
31 December 2011	22nd	Bournemouth	H	L	1–3	Huntington	5,632	
2 January 2012	21st	Exeter City	A	D	1–1	A. Williams	5,912	
10 January 2012	21st	Sheffield United	A	L	0–4		15,965	
14 January 2012	21st	Tranmere Rovers	H	W	2–1	Edwards, A. Williams	4,083	
21 January 2012	21st	Bury	A	L	2–3	Dickson, MacLean	2,527	
28 January 2012	18th	Preston North End	H	W	2–1	A. Williams (2)	4,245	
4 February 2012	18th	Sheffield Wednesday	A	L	1–2	Obika	17,213	
14 February 2012	18th	Wycombe Wanderers	A	W	3–2	A. Williams (2), Agard	3,529	
18 February 2012	18th	Colchester United	H	W	3–2	Parrett, D'Ath, A. Williams	3,442	
25 February 2012	18th	Carlisle United	A	L	2–3	Obika, Blizzard	4,265	
3 March 2012	17th	Brentford	H	W	2–1	A. Williams (2)	3,930	
6 March 2012	17th	Milton Keynes Dons	A	W	1–0	G. Williams	6,624	
10 March 2012	15th	Oldham Athletic	A	W	2–1	G. Williams, A. Williams	4,689	
13 March 2012	13th	Scunthorpe United	H	D	2–2	G. Williams, Franks	3,767	
17 March 2012	12th	Walsall	H	W	2–1	A. Williams (2)	3,705	
20 March 2012	14th	Charlton Athletic	A	L	0–3		13,717	
24 March 2012	16th	Hartlepool United	H	L	0–1		4,033	
31 March 2012	15th	Bournemouth	A	D	0–0		6,170	
7 April 2012	14th	Rochdale	H	W	3–1	Franks, Hinds, Woods	3,859	
9 April 2012	15th	Notts County	A	L	1–3	Franks	5,852	
14 April 2012	17th	Stevenage	H	L	0–6		3,610	
21 April 2012	16th	Leyton Orient	A	D	2–2	A. Williams, Obika	4,888	
28 April 2012	16th	Chesterfield	H	W	3–2	Blizzard, Agard, A. Williams	4,563	
5 May 2012	17th	Huddersfield Town	A	L	0–2		13,520	

==== League table ====
Pos	Team	Pld	W	D	L	GF	GA	GD	Pts
15	Preston North End	46	13	15	18	54	68	−14	54
16	Oldham Athletic	46	14	12	20	50	66	−16	54
17	Yeovil Town	46	14	12	20	59	80	−21	54
18	Scunthorpe United	46	10	22	14	55	59	−4	52
19	Walsall	46	10	20	16	51	57	−6	50

Updated to match(es) played on 5 May 2012. Source: BBC Sport
Rules for classification: 1) Points; 2) Goal difference; 3) Number of goals scored

=== FA Cup ===
Round	Date	Opponents	Venue	Result	Score F–A	Scorers	Attendance	Ref
First round	12 November 2011	Hereford United	A	W	3–0	Upson, A. Williams, Blizzard	2,469	
Second round	2 December 2011	Fleetwood Town	A	D	2–2	Upson, Clifford	3,319	
Second round replay	13 December 2011	Fleetwood Town	H	L	0–2		3,276	

=== League Cup ===
Round	Date	Opponents	Venue	Result	Score F–A	Scorers	Attendance	Ref
First round	9 August 2011	Exeter City	A	L	0–2		3,856	

=== Football League Trophy ===
Yeovil received a bye to the Second Round of the Football League Trophy.

Round	Date	Opponents	Venue	Result	Score F–A	Scorers	Attendance	Ref
Second round	4 October 2011	Bournemouth	A	L	2–3	MacLean, Ehmer	3,265	

== Statistics ==
=== Player details ===
Numbers in parentheses denote appearances as substitute.

No.	Position	Nationality	Name	Apps	Goals	Apps	Goals	Apps	Goals	Apps	Goals	Apps	Goals	Yellow card	Red card
No.	Position	Nationality	Name	League		FA Cup		League Cup		FL Trophy		Total		Discipline	
1	Goalkeeper	England	Jed Steer	12	0	0	0	1	0	1	0	14	0	0	0
1	Goalkeeper	Ireland	Rene Gilmartin	8	0	0	0	0	0	0	0	8	0	0	0
1	Goalkeeper	England	Sam Walker	20	0	0	0	0	0	0	0	20	0	1	0
2	Defender	England	Luke Ayling	44	0	3	0	1	0	0	0	48	0	9	1
3	Defender	Wales	Nathan Jones	22 (1)	0	0	0	1	0	0	0	23 (1)	0	5	0
4	Defender	England	Bondz N'Gala	24 (7)	2	3	0	0	0	1	0	28 (7)	2	7	1
5	Defender	England	Paul Huntington	37	2	3	0	1	0	1	0	42	2	4	1
6	Midfielder	England	Dominic Blizzard	24 (6)	3	2	1	0	0	0	0	26 (6)	4	1	0
7	Forward	England	Andy Williams	31 (4)	16	3	1	1	0	0	0	35 (4)	17	1	0
8	Midfielder	England	Ed Upson	40 (1)	3	3	2	1	0	0	0	44 (1)	5	15	0
9	Forward	Scotland	Steve MacLean	14 (6)	3	1 (1)	0	0 (1)	0	0 (1)	1	15 (9)	4	5	0
10	Midfielder	Wales	Gavin Williams	23 (5)	4	0 (1)	0	1	0	0	0	24 (6)	4	2	0
11	Midfielder	England	Anthony Edgar	5 (5)	1	0	0	1	0	0 (1)	0	6 (6)	1	0	0
12	Midfielder	England	Abdulai Bell-Baggie	0	0	0	0	0	0	0	0	0	0	0	0
12	Defender	England	Ryan Dickson	5	1	0	0	0	0	0	0	5	1	0	0
12	Midfielder	England	Michael Woods	2 (3)	1	0	0	0	0	0	0	2 (3)	1	0	1
14	Defender	Germany	Max Ehmer	24	0	3	0	0	0	1	1	28	1	8	0
14	Midfielder	England	Lawson D'Ath	12 (2)	1	0	0	0	0	0	0	12 (2)	1	2	0
15	Defender	England	Kerrea Gilbert	3 (5)	0	0	0	0	0	1	0	4 (5)	0	1	1
15	Defender	England	Joe Edwards	4	1	0	0	0	0	0	0	4	1	0	0
15	Defender	England	Josh Morris	3 (2)	0	0	0	0	0	0	0	3 (2)	0	0	0
16	Forward	England	Oli Johnson	5 (1)	0	1 (1)	0	0	0	0 (1)	0	6 (3)	0	1	0
16	Forward	England	Jonathan Franks	13 (1)	3	0	0	0	0	0	0	13 (1)	3	0	0
17	Midfielder	Ireland	Alan O'Brien	8 (5)	0	0 (1)	0	0	0	1	0	9 (6)	0	0	0
17	Defender	England	Jonathan Grounds	13 (1)	0	0	0	0	0	0	0	13 (1)	0	1	0
18	Forward	England	Kieran Agard	13 (16)	6	3	0	0 (1)	0	0 (1)	0	16 (18)	6	5	1
19	Defender	England	Curtis Haynes-Brown	1 (9)	0	0	0	1	0	1	0	3 (9)	0	1	1
20	Midfielder	England	Paul Wotton	22	2	3	0	1	0	1	0	27	2	10	0
21	Forward	England	Gavin Massey	8 (8)	3	0	0	0	0	1	0	9 (8)	3	1	0
22	Midfielder	Guadeloupe	Flavien Belson	1	0	0	0	0	0	0	0	1	0	1	1
22	Midfielder	England	Dean Parrett	9 (1)	1	0	0	0	0	0	0	9 (1)	1	3	1
23	Midfielder	England	Billy Gibson	1 (4)	0	0 (2)	0	0	0	1	0	2 (5)	0	0	0
24	Goalkeeper	England	Gareth Stewart	1	0	3	0	0	0	0	0	4	0	0	0
25	Defender	England	Darren Purse	5	0	0	0	0	0	0	0	5	0	0	0
26	Defender	Central African Republic	Kelly Youga	0 (1)	0	0	0	0	0	0	0	0 (1)	0	0	0
28	Defender	England	Richard Hinds	15 (1)	1	0	0	0	0	0	0	15 (1)	1	3	0
29	Forward	England	Jonathan Obika	24 (3)	4	0	0	0 (1)	0	0	0	24 (4)	4	3	0
30	Goalkeeper	Czech Republic	Marek Štěch	5	0	0	0	0	0	0	0	5	0	1	0
31	Defender	England	Alistair Slowe	0	0	0	0	0	0	0	0	0	0	0	0
37	Forward	New Zealand	Rory Fallon	0 (5)	0	0	0	1	0	0	0	1 (5)	0	0	0
37	Midfielder	Ireland	Conor Clifford	6 (1)	0	2	1	0	0	0	0	8 (1)	1	1	0
38	Midfielder	England	Lewis Clarke	0	0	0	0	0	0	0	0	0	0	0	0
39	Forward	England	Robert Clowes	0	0	0	0	0	0	0	0	0	0	0	0
40	Defender	Wales	Rhys Baggridge	0	0	0	0	0	0	0	0	0	0	0	0

=== Suspensions ===
Player	Date Received	Offence	Length of suspension	
Curtis Haynes-Brown	(yellow card) (yellow-red card) v Sheffield United, 27 August	Second bookable offence	1 match	Tranmere Rovers (A), League One
Paul Wotton	(yellow card) v Wycombe Wanderers, 13 September	5 cautions	1 match	Sheffield Wednesday (H), League One
Luke Ayling	(yellow card) v Bury, 1 October	5 cautions	1 match	Bournemouth (A), FL Trophy
Ed Upson	(yellow card) v Bury, 1 October	5 cautions	1 match	Bournemouth (A), FL Trophy
Flavien Belson	(yellow card) (yellow-red card) v Carlisle United, 15 October	Second bookable offence	1 match	Stevenage (A), League One
Nathan Jones	(yellow card) v Carlisle United, 15 October	5 cautions	1 match	Stevenage (A), League One
Luke Ayling	(red card) v Stevenage, 22 October	Deliberate handball preventing a goal	1 match	Leyton Orient (H), League One
Max Ehmer	(yellow card) v Leyton Orient, 25 October	5 cautions	1 match	Huddersfield Town (H), League One
Luke Ayling	FA Charge, 2 November	Foul and abusive language	1 match	Chesterfield (A), League One
Bondz N'Gala	(yellow card) (yellow-red card) v Fleetwood Town, 13 December	Second bookable offence	1 match	Rochdale (A), League One
Kerrea Gilbert	(red card) v Rochdale, 17 December	Serious foul play	3 matches	Charlton Athletic (H), Bournemouth (H), Exeter City (A), League One
Ed Upson	(yellow card) v Charlton Athletic, 26 December	10 cautions	2 matches	Bournemouth (H), Exeter City (A), League One
Paul Wotton	(yellow card) v Charlton Athletic, 26 December	10 cautions	2 matches	Bournemouth (H), Exeter City (A), League One
Paul Huntington	(red card) v Preston North End, 28 January	Serious foul play	3 matches	Sheffield Wednesday (A), Wycombe Wanderers (A), Colchester United (H), League One
Paul Huntington	FA Charge, 8 February	Rule E3	1 match	Carlisle United (A), League One
Kieran Agard	(red card) v Colchester United, 18 February	Serious foul play	3 matches	Carlisle United (A), Brentford (H), Milton Keynes Dons (A), League One
Dean Parrett	(yellow card) (yellow-red card) v Milton Keynes Dons, 6 March	Second bookable offence	1 match	Oldham Athletic (A), League One
Ed Upson	(yellow card) v Notts County, 9 April	15 cautions	3 matches	Stevenage (H), Leyton Orient (A), Chesterfield (H), League One
Michael Woods	(red card) v Stevenage, 14 April	Serious foul play	3 matches	Leyton Orient (A), Chesterfield (H), Huddersfield Town (A) League One

=== Captains ===
No.	Pos	Player	Starts (as captain)
20	MF	Paul Wotton	28
5	DF	Paul Huntington	18
2	DF	Luke Ayling	4

=== Penalties ===
Date	Penalty Taker	Scored	Opponent	Competition
13 August 2011	Paul Wotton	Yes	Oldham Athletic	League One
9 September 2011	Steve MacLean	Yes	Preston North End	League One
24 September 2011	Paul Wotton	Yes	Scunthorpe United	League One
25 October 2011	Paul Wotton	No	Leyton Orient	League One

=== International call-ups ===
No.	Position	Name	Country	Level	Caps	Goals	Notes
30	GK	Marek Štěch	Czech Republic	U-21	1	0	
37	MF	Conor Clifford	Republic of Ireland	U-21	1	0	

== Awards ==
=== League One Team of the season ===
- (Wales) Gavin Williams – Right wing

=== League One Team of the Week ===
Position	Player	Opponent	Date	Notes
FW	(England) Andy Williams	Oldham Athletic (H)	13 August 2011
FW	(England) Gavin Massey	Colchester United (A)	8 October 2011
GK	(Czech Republic) Marek Štěch	Stevenage (A)	22 October 2011
MF	(England) Ed Upson	Exeter City (H)	19 November 2011
DF	(England) Bondz N'Gala	Hartlepool United (A)	26 November 2011
MF	(England) Dominic Blizzard	Hartlepool United (A)	26 November 2011
GK	(Republic of Ireland) Rene Gilmartin	Rochdale (A)	17 December 2011
FW	(England) Andy Williams	Preston North End (H)	28 January 2012
FW	(England) Andy Williams	Colchester United (H)	18 February 2012
FW	(England) Andy Williams	Brentford (H)	3 March 2012
MF	(Wales) Gavin Williams	Oldham Athletic (A)	10 March 2012
GK	(England) Sam Walker	Bournemouth (A)	31 March 2012
MF	(England) Dominic Blizzard	Chesterfield (H)	28 April 2012
FW	(England) Andy Williams	Chesterfield (H)	28 April 2012

=== End-of-season awards ===
Green & White Supporters Club Player of the Season

- Winner: Andy Williams
- Runner-up: Luke Ayling

Western Gazette Player of the Season

- Winner: Paul Huntington

Cary Glovers Player of the Season

- Winner: Andy Williams

Away Travel Club Player of the Season

- Winner: Andy Williams
- Runner-up: Luke Ayling

Bobby Hamilton Young Player Award

- Winner: Luke Ayling

Andy Stone Memorial Trophy for Top Goalscorer

- Winner: Andy Williams

Disabled Supporters Association Player of the Season

- Winner: Andy Williams
- Young Player: Luke Ayling

Yeovil Town Community Sports Trust Player of the Season

- Winner: Luke Ayling

== See also ==
- 2011–12 in English football
- List of Yeovil Town F.C. seasons
