= Alan O'Brien =

Irish footballer (born 1985)

Personal information
- Date of birth: 20 February 1985 (age 41)
- Place of birth: Dublin, Ireland
- Position: Winger

Youth career
- 2001–2004: Newcastle United

Senior career*
Years	Team	Apps	(Gls)
2004–2007	Newcastle United	5	(0)
2005	→ Carlisle United (loan)	5	(1)
2007–2009	Hibernian	47	(0)
2009–2011	Swindon Town	30	(0)
2011–2012	Yeovil Town	13	(0)
2012	Gateshead	12	(0)
2012–2017	Hungerford Town	73	(4)
2017	Chippenham Town	3	(0)
2017–2018	Wealdstone	4	(0)
Total		192	(5)

International career
2006–2007	Republic of Ireland	5	(0)
- * Club domestic league appearances and goals

Alan O'Brien (born 20 February 1985) is an Irish former footballer who last played for Wealdstone. O'Brien, who played as a winger, represented the Republic of Ireland at full international level five times, all while he was on the books of Newcastle United.

== Club career ==
=== Newcastle United ===
O'Brien played for Cabinteely and St Josephs at youth level in Ireland before signing for Newcastle United. He played in the under–17 national championship winning team who beat Manchester United 5–2 in a final played over two legs at Old Trafford and St James' Park. He then featured regularly for the Newcastle reserve team during the 2003/04 season, but he suffered a broken leg in a training ground accident in July 2004. O'Brien progressed in the next year to the extent that he was in the first team squad, but he was sent on loan to Carlisle United during October 2005. He scored within 10 minutes of his debut for Carlisle, but the loan spell was cut short due to injury.

O'Brien made his Newcastle first team debut on 7 January 2006 in a FA Cup tie against Mansfield Town. Wolves and Norwich City were interested in signing O'Brien, but Glenn Roeder kept O'Brien due to the demands on a small Newcastle squad. O'Brien eventually made his first full Premier League appearance on 20 January 2007 against West Ham United at St James' Park. He played the full 90 minutes against West Ham, but never made another first team start.

=== Hibernian ===
On 25 June 2007, O'Brien agreed to sign a three-year contract with Scottish Premier League side Hibernian after the expiry of his contract with Newcastle United, who were entitled to compensation. O'Brien initially struggled to win a place in the Hibernian team, and he turned down a loan move to Football League One side Crewe Alexandra in January 2008. He played more regularly for Hibs during the 2008–09 season, although he missed two months due to a knee injury. He was released by the club on 1 July 2009 after his contract was cancelled by mutual consent.

=== Swindon Town ===
Soon after his release by Hibernian, O'Brien signed for Swindon Town. He made his debut for Swindon on the opening day of the 2009–10 season in a 5–0 defeat away at Gillingham.

O'Brien managed four appearances for Swindon before suffering a hamstring injury in August. O'Brien made just one substitute appearance under the management of Paul Hart, who decided to release O'Brien from his contract in April 2011. O'Brien made a total of 40 appearances, the majority as a substitute, in two seasons for Swindon.

=== Yeovil Town ===
O'Brien signed for Yeovil Town on 12 August 2011. He was released from his contract by Yeovil on 4 January 2012, along with Kerrea Gilbert, Flavien Belson and Abdulai Bell-Baggie.

=== Gateshead ===
O'Brien signed for Gateshead on 9 February 2012. He made his debut on 18 February 2012 in a 2–1 defeat against Forest Green Rovers. O'Brien was released by Gateshead at the end of the season.

=== Hungerford Town ===
In the summer of 2012, O'Brien joined Hungerford Town; he made his debut for the club in a 2–1 away win at Bridgwater Town on 18 August 2012.

=== Wealdstone ===
O'Brien signed for National League South side Wealdstone FC in September 2017. His season was affected by a succession of injuries and, by July 2018, decided to retire from football.

== International career ==
O'Brien was capped by Ireland at several youth levels. After impressing during the pre-season of 2006 he received a call up to the senior squad for the first time, where he joined up with then Newcastle teammates Damien Duff, Stephen Carr, and Shay Given. He came on as a second-half substitute for the friendly match against Netherlands to gain his first full international cap.

== Career statistics ==
=== Club ===
As of match played 9 December 2017

Appearances and goals by club, season and competition
Club	Season	League			FA Cup		League Cup		Other		Total	
Club	Season	Division	Apps	Goals	Apps	Goals	Apps	Goals	Apps	Goals	Apps	Goals
Newcastle United	2004–05	Premier League	0	0	0	0	0	0	0	0	0	0
Newcastle United	2005–06	Premier League	3	0	1	0	0	0	0	0	4	0
Newcastle United	2006–07	Premier League	2	0	2	0	0	0	1 (Note: Appearances in the Intertoto Cup)	0	5	0
Newcastle United	Total		5	0	3	0	0	0	1	0	9	0
Carlisle United (loan)	2005–06	League Two	5	1	0	0	0	0	0	0	5	1
Carlisle United (loan)	Total		5	1	0	0	0	0	0	0	5	1
Hibernian	2007–08	Scottish Premier League	23	0	3	0	1	0	0	0	27	0
Hibernian	2008–09	Scottish Premier League	24	0	1	0	0	0	1	0	26	0
Hibernian	Total		47	0	4	0	1	0	1	0	53	0
Swindon Town	2009–10	League One	9	0	1	0	1	0	3 (Note: Appearances in the League One play-offs)	0	14	0
Swindon Town	2010–11	League One	21	0	1	0	1	0	3 (Note: Appearances in the Football League Trophy)	0	26	0
Swindon Town	Total		30	0	2	0	2	0	6	0	40	0
Yeovil Town	2011–12	League One	13	0	1	0	0	0	1	0	15	0
Yeovil Town	Total		13	0	1	0	0	0	1	0	15	0
Gateshead	2011–12	Conference Premier	12	0	0	0	0	0	1 (Note: Appearance in the FA Trophy)	0	13	0
Gateshead	Total		12	0	0	0	0	0	1	0	13	0
Hungerford Town	2012–13	SFL - Div 1 South & West	?	2	?	0	—		?	0	?	2
Hungerford Town	2013–14	SFL - Premier Division	?	2	?	?	—		?	?	?	2
Hungerford Town	2014–15	SFL - Premier Division	33	5	1	0	—		6 (Note: Two appearances in the Berks & Bucks Senior Cup; One appearance in the FA Trophy; One appearance in the Southern League Cup; one appearance in the Southern League Premier Division play-offs; one appearance and a goal in the Basingstoke Senior Cup)	1	40	6
Hungerford Town	2015–16	SFL - Premier Division	26	2	2	0	—		6 (Note: Four appearances and a goal in the FA Trophy; two appearances in the Southern League Cup)	1	34	3
Hungerford Town	2016–17	National League South	19	1	0	0	—		3 (Note: Two appearances in the Berks & Bucks Senior Cup; One appearance in the FA Trophy)	0	22	1
Hungerford Town	Total		78	12	3	0	0	0	15	2	96	14
Chippenham Town	2017–18	National League South	3	0	0	0	—		0	0	3	0
Wealdstone	2017–18	National League South	4	0	0	0	—		0	0	4	0
Career totals			197	13	13	0	3	0	25	2	238	15

=== International ===
As of match played 26 May 2007

National team	Year	Apps	Goals
Republic of Ireland	2006	4	0
Republic of Ireland	2007	1	0
Total		5	0
