= Billy Gibson (footballer, born 1990) =

English footballer (born 1990)

Personal information
- Full name: William Michael Hubert Gibson
- Date of birth: 30 September 1990 (age 36)
- Place of birth: Harrow, England
- Height: 1.86 m (6 ft 1 in)
- Position: Midfielder

Youth career
- 2007–2008: Watford

Senior career*
Years	Team	Apps	(Gls)
2008–2010	Watford	0	(0)
2009–2010	→ Wealdstone (loan)	5	(2)
2010–2012	Yeovil Town	9	(0)
2012	→ Braintree Town (loan)	8	(2)
2012–2013	Cambridge United	5	(0)
2015	Hemel Hempstead Town	2	(0)
2015–2016	St Albans City	27	(0)
2016–2017	Wealdstone	1	(0)
- * Club domestic league appearances and goals as of 13:23, 10 May 2020 (UTC)

William Michael Hubert Gibson (born 30 September 1990) is an English professional footballer who plays as a midfielder most recently for National League South club Wealdstone in the 2016–17 season.

== Career ==
=== Watford ===
Gibson began a two-year academy scholarship with Watford in summer 2007. In 2007–08 he made 26 appearances for the under 18s, all of which were starts and making him the highest appearance maker for the academy that season. He also scored three goals. He also made 12 appearances for the reserves, six of them starts, scoring three goals.

After appearing for Watford's first team during the 2008 pre-season, on 12 August 2008 he made his competitive debut whilst still an academy scholar. Part of a weakened side for the League Cup, Gibson came on as a 60th-minute substitute for Jon Harley. Playing on the left-wing, he set up Will Hoskins for the only goal of the game as Watford beat League One side Bristol Rovers.

In October 2008, along with Rob Kiernan and Ross Jenkins, Gibson signed a developmental contract, keeping him with Watford until the end of the 2009–10 season. A professional contract, it allowed the players to continue their scholarship without the pressure of worrying about their future. Although he did not appear again for the first team that season, he played 5 games for the reserves and made 10 starts for the academy, scoring 4 goals.

On 15 December 2009 Gibson joined Isthmian Premier League side Wealdstone on a month-long loan. On his second appearance for the club, he scored both goals in a 2–1 victory over Wealdstone's local rivals Harrow Borough.

=== Yeovil Town ===
In July 2010, Gibson went for a trial with League One Yeovil Town. On 20 August 2010, he was signed on a short-term contract until December, a deal which was extended until the end of the season. He was informed by the club at the end of the 2010/11 season that he was one of seven Yeovil players who would be awarded new contracts.

On 22 March 2012, Gibson was sent out on loan to Conference National side Braintree Town until the end of the season. On 3 May 2012, it was announced that Gibson had been released by Yeovil Town.

=== Cambridge United ===
On 1 June 2012, Gibson signed a one-year contract with Conference National side Cambridge United becoming Jez George's fourth signing of the close season.

== Career statistics ==
As of match played 5 November 2016

Appearances and goals by club, season and competition
Club	Season	League			FA Cup		League Cup		Other		Total	
Club	Season	Division	Apps	Goals	Apps	Goals	Apps	Goals	Apps	Goals	Apps	Goals
Watford	2008–09	Championship	0	0	0	0	1	0	—		1	0
Watford	2009–10	Championship	0	0	0	0	0	0	—		0	0
Watford	Total		0	0	0	0	1	0	—		1	0
Wealdstone (loan)	2009–10	IL Premier Division	5	2	—		—		—		5	2
Yeovil Town	2010–11	League One	4	0	1	0	0	0	0	0	5	0
Yeovil Town	2011–12	League One	5	0	2	0	0	0	1 (Note: Appearance in Football League Trophy)	0	8	0
Yeovil Town	Total		9	0	3	0	0	0	1	0	13	0
Braintree Town (loan)	2011–12	Conference Premier	8	2	—		—		—		8	2
Cambridge United	2012–13	Conference Premier	5	0	0	0	—		0	0	5	0
Hemel Hempstead Town	2014–15	Conference South	2	0	0	0	—		0	0	2	0
St Albans City	2015–16	National League South	27	0	3	0	—		5 (Note: Three appearances in Herts Senior Cup, two appearances in Herts Charity Cup)	0	35	0
Wealdstone	2016–17	National League South	1	0	0	0	—		4 (Note: Two appearances in Middlesex Senior Cup, two appearances and two goals in Middlesex Senior Charity Cup)	2	5	2
Career total			57	4	6	0	1	0	10	2	74	6
