= 2008–09 Milton Keynes Dons F.C. season =

Milton Keynes Dons
2008–09 season
- Chairman: Pete Winkelman
- Manager: Roberto Di Matteo
- Stadium: Stadium mk
- League One: 3rd (qualified for play-offs)
- FA Cup: First round
- League Cup: Second round
- League Trophy: Second round
- Top goalscorer: League: Aaron Wilbraham (17); All: Aaron Wilbraham (17)
- Highest home attendance: 17,717 (vs Leicester City); 28 February 2009, League One
- Lowest home attendance: 6,931 (vs Stockport County); 21 October 2008, League One
- Average home league attendance: 10,550
- Biggest win: 6–2 (vs Oldham Athletic); 14 March 2009, League One
- Biggest defeat: 3–2 (vs Carlisle United); 17 January 2009, League One
Home colours	Away colours	Third colours

The 2008–09 season was the fifth season of competitive association football in the Football League played by Milton Keynes Dons Football Club, a professional football club based in Milton Keynes, Buckinghamshire, England.

Following their successful promotion from League Two in the previous 2007–08 season, the club returned to League One. On 2 July 2008, following the resignation of manager Paul Ince, the club appointed former Chelsea midfielder Roberto Di Matteo, his first managerial role in football.

The season covers the period from 1 July 2008 to 30 June 2009.

== Competitions ==
=== League One ===
Final table

Pos	Team	Pld	W	D	L	GF	GA	GD	Pts
1	Leicester City (C,P)	46	27	15	4	84	39	+45	96
2	Peterborough United (P)	46	26	11	9	78	54	+24	89
3	Milton Keynes Dons	46	26	9	11	83	47	+36	87
4	Leeds United	46	26	6	14	77	49	+28	84
5	Millwall	46	25	7	14	63	53	+10	82

Source: Sky Sports

Matches

Win	Draw	Loss

Date	Opponent	Venue	Result	Scorers	Attendance	Ref
9 August 2008 – 15:00	Leicester City	Away	0–2		23,351	
16 August 2008 – 15:00	Northampton Town	Home	1–0	Wilbraham	12,078	
23 August 2008 – 15:00	Huddersfield Town	Away	3–1	Stirling, Wright, Leven	13,189	
30 August 2008 – 15:00	Swindon Town	Away	1–2	Stirling	8,846	
6 September 2008 – 15:00	Yeovil Town	Home	3–0	Leven (2), Baldock	7,959	
13 September 2008 – 15:00	Oldham Athletic	Away	0–2		5,530	
20 September 2008 – 15:00	Colchester United	Away	3–0	Wilbraham, Baldock (2)	4,888	
27 September 2008 – 15:00	Peterborough United	Home	1–2	Gerba	10,876	
4 October 2008 – 15:00	Millwall	Away	4–0	O'Hanlon, Baldock (2), Robinson (o.g.)	9,871	
11 October 2008 – 15:00	Carlisle United	Home	3–1	Leven (2), Llera	11,194	
18 October 2008 – 15:00	Crewe Alexandra	Away	2–2	Baldock, Chadwick	4,055	
21 October 2008 – 19:45	Stockport County	Home	1–2	Gerba	6,931	
25 October 2008 – 15:00	Cheltenham Town	Home	3–1	Gerba (2), Baldock	8,190	
28 October 2008 – 19:45	Leyton Orient	Away	2–1	Chadwick (2)	3,869	
1 November 2008 – 15:00	Tranmere Rovers	Home	1–0	Gallen	8,185	
15 November 2008 – 15:00	Hartlepool United	Away	3–1	Lewington, Wright, Powell	4,021	
22 November 2008 – 15:00	Walsall	Away	3–0	Johnson, Gerba, Wright	5,026	
25 November 2008 – 19:45	Hereford United	Home	3–0	Leven, Wright, Johnson	7,189	
6 December 2008 – 15:00	Scunthorpe United	Away	0–2		11,550	
12 December 2008 – 19:45	Brighton & Hove Albion	Away	4–2	Llera, Johnson, Leven, Puncheon	5,691	
20 December 2008 – 15:00	Leeds United	Home	3–1	O'Hanlon, Wilbraham (2)	17,073	
26 December 2008 – 15:00	Bristol Rovers	Away	2–1	Wilbraham, Anthony (o.g.)	9,002	
28 December 2008 – 15:00	Southend United	Home	2–0	O'Hanlon, Baldock	10,432	
12 January 2009 – 19:45	Colchester United	Home	1–1	Wilbraham	8,408	
17 January 2009 – 15:00	Carlisle United	Away	2–3	Wilbraham (2)	6,298	
20 January 2009 – 19:45	Peterborough United	Away	0–0		8,982	
27 January 2009 – 19:45	Leyton Orient	Home	1–2	Chadwick	8,170	
31 January 2009 – 15:00	Cheltenham Town	Away	5–3	Johnson (2), Wilbraham (3)	3,681	
3 February 2009 – 19:45	Stockport County	Away	1–0	Wilbraham	4,891	
14 February 2009 – 15:00	Hartlepool United	Home	3–1	Gerba (2), Lewington	8,657	
21 February 2009 – 15:00	Tranmere Rovers	Away	1–1	Leven	5,625	
28 February 2009 – 15:00	Leicester City	Home	2–2	Leven (2)	17,717	
7 March 2009 – 15:00	Swindon Town	Away	1–1	Wilbraham	7,453	
10 March 2009 – 19:45	Huddersfield Town	Home	1–1	Baldock	9,707	
14 March 2009 – 15:00	Oldham Athletic	Home	6–2	Wilbraham, Puncheon, Baldock (2), Navarro, Gerba	10,621	
17 March 2009 – 19:45	Millwall	Home	0–1		12,238	
21 March 2009 – 15:00	Yeovil Town	Away	0–0		9,707	
24 March 2009 – 19:45	Crewe Alexandra	Away	2–2	Wilbraham, Puncheon	8,454	
28 March 2009 – 15:00	Leeds United	Away	0–2		27,649	
4 April 2009 – 15:00	Brighton & Hove Albion	Home	2–0	Gerba, Puncheon	15,842	
10 April 2009 – 15:00	Southend United	Away	2–0	Wright (2)	10,241	
13 April 2009 – 15:00	Bristol Rovers	Home	2–1	Gerba, Chadwick	10,251	
18 April 2009 – 15:00	Scunthorpe United	Away	1–0	Chadwick	4,873	
25 April 2009 – 15:00	Walsall	Home	0–1		12,094	
28 April 2009 – 19:45	Northampton Town	Away	1–0	Wilbraham	6,054	
2 May 2009 – 15:00	Hereford United	Away	1–0	Howell	3,224	

Play-offs

Date	Opponent	Venue	Result	Scorers	Attendance	Ref
8 May 2009 – 19:45	Scunthorpe United	Away	1–1	Wilbraham	6,599	
15 May 2009 – 19:45	Scunthorpe United	Home	0–0 (Note: After extra-time. 0–0 at the conclusion of 90 minutes. Scunthorpe won 7–6 on penalties.)		14,479	

=== FA Cup ===
Matches

Win	Draw	Loss

Date	Round	Opponent	Venue	Result	Scorers	Attendance	Ref
9 November 2008 – 15:00	First round	Bradford City	Home	1–2	Johnson	5,542	

=== League Cup ===
Matches

Win	Draw	Loss

Date	Round	Opponent	Venue	Result	Scorers	Attendance	Ref
12 August 2008 – 19:45	First round	Norwich City	Home	1–0	Baldock	6,261	
26 August 2008 – 19:45	Second round	Cardiff City	Away	1–2	O'Hanlon	6,334	

=== League Trophy ===
Matches

Win	Draw	Loss

Date	Round	Opponent	Venue	Result	Scorers	Attendance	Ref
7 October 2008 – 19:45	Second round	Bournemouth	Away	0–1		4,329	

== Player details ==
List of squad players, including number of appearances by competition.
Players with squad numbers struck through and marked † left the club during the playing season.

No.	Pos	Nat	Player	Total		League One		FA Cup		League Cup		Other (Note: Includes Football League Trophy and 2008–09 Football League One play-offs.)	
No.	Pos	Nat	Player	Apps	Goals	Apps	Goals	Apps	Goals	Apps	Goals	Apps	Goals
1	GK	(England) ENG	Nathan Abbey	2	0	1	0	0	0	0	0	1	0
2	DF	(England) ENG	Jude Stirling	38	2	34	2	1	0	2	0	1	0
3	DF	(England) ENG	Dean Lewington	46	2	42	2	1	0	2	0	1	0
~~4~~ †	MF	(Republic of Ireland) IRL	Keith Andrews	2	0	1	0	0	0	1	0	0	0
4	DF	(Spain) ESP	Miguel Llera	38	2	36	2	1	0	0	0	1	0
~~5~~ †	DF	(Guinea) GUI	Drissa Diallo	1	0	0	0	0	0	1	0	0	0
6	DF	(England) ENG	Sean O'Hanlon	44	4	40	3	1	0	2	1	1	0
7	FW	(England) ENG	Mark Wright	37	5	34	5	1	0	1	0	1	0
8	FW	(United States) USA	Jemal Johnson	37	6	33	5	1	1	2	0	1	0
9	FW	(England) ENG	Aaron Wilbraham	36	17	35	17	0	0	1	0	0	0
~~10~~ †	FW	(England) ENG	Kevin Gallen	8	1	6	1	1	0	0	0	1	0
~~11~~ †	MF	(Austria) AUT	Florian Sturm	7	0	5	0	0	0	1	0	1	0
12	GK	(France) FRA	Willy Guéret	48	0	46	0	0	0	2	0	0	0
14	DF	(England) ENG	Carl Regan	31	0	29	0	0	0	1	0	1	0
15	FW	(England) ENG	Sam Baldock	44	11	42	10	0	0	2	1	0	0
~~16~~ †	FW	(Republic of Ireland) IRL	Donal McDermott	1	0	1	0	0	0	0	0	0	0
16	MF	(England) ENG	Jason Puncheon	9	1	9	1	0	0	0	0	0	0
17	DF	(Jamaica) JAM	Shaun Cummings	35	0	33	0	1	0	1	0	0	0
18	FW	(Canada) CAN	Ali Gerba	25	10	24	10	1	0	0	0	0	0
19	MF	(Republic of Ireland) IRL	Stephen Gleeson	5	0	5	0	0	0	0	0	0	0
~~19~~ †	DF	(England) ENG	Carl Magnay	1	0	1	0	0	0	0	0	0	0
~~19~~ †	DF	(England) ENG	Paul Mitchell	1	0	0	0	0	0	1	0	0	0
20	MF	(England) ENG	Alan Navarro	41	1	38	1	1	0	1	0	1	0
22	MF	(Scotland) SCO	Peter Leven	44	10	42	10	1	0	1	0	0	0
~~23~~ †	MF	(Jamaica) JAM	Craig Dobson	1	0	0	0	0	0	1	0	0	0
24	MF	(France) FRA	Flavien Belson	15	0	13	0	1	0	0	0	1	0
25	DF	(England) ENG	Danny Swailes	2	0	1	0	0	0	1	0	0	0
26	MF	(England) ENG	Luke Chadwick	27	6	26	6	0	0	0	0	1	0
27	MF	(England) ENG	David King	1	0	0	0	0	0	1	0	0	0
28	DF	(England) ENG	Adam Chicksen	3	0	1	0	0	0	1	0	1	0
~~29~~ †	GK	(Wales) WAL	Lewis Price	3	0	2	0	1	0	0	0	0	0
30	FW	(England) ENG	Daniel Powell	7	1	7	1	0	0	0	0	0	0
~~32~~ †	DF	(England) ENG	Bondz Ngala	3	0	3	0	0	0	0	0	0	0
35	FW	(Norway) NOR	Tore André Flo	14	0	13	0	0	0	0	0	1	0

== Transfers ==
=== Transfers in ===
Date from	Position	Name	From	Fee	Ref.
1 July 2008	MF	(Scotland) Peter Leven	Chesterfield	Free transfer	
23 July 2008	MF	(Austria) Florian Sturm	Free agent (Note: Previous club: FC Vaduz.)	Free transfer	
7 August 2008	FW	(Canada) Ali Gerba	Free agent (Note: Previous club: FC Ingolstadt 04.)	Free transfer	
20 August 2008	MF	(France) Flavien Belson	Free agent (Note: Previous club: FC Metz.)	Free transfer	
1 September 2008	DF	(Spain) Miguel Llera	Free agent (Note: Previous club: Hércules CF.)	Free transfer	
21 November 2008	FW	(Norway) Tore André Flo	Free agent (Note: Previous club: Leeds United.)	Free transfer	
1 January 2009	MF	(England) Luke Chadwick	Free agent (Note: Previous club: Leeds United.)	Free transfer	

=== Transfers out ===
Date from	Position	Name	To	Fee	Ref.
1 July 2008	FW	(England) Lloyd Dyer	Released (Note: Joined Leicester City on 1 July 2008.)		
1 July 2008	MF	(Scotland) Colin Cameron	Released (Note: Joined Dundee on 15 July 2008.)		
14 July 2008	FW	(The Gambia) Mustapha Carayol	Torquay United	Undisclosed	
28 August 2008	MF	(Republic of Ireland) Keith Andrews	Blackburn Rovers	£1,300,000	
2 January 2009	MF	(Jamaica) Craig Dobson	Released (Note: Joined Brentford on 24 March 2009.)		
6 January 2009	MF	(England) Paul Mitchell	Retired		
12 January 2009	FW	(England) Kevin Gallen	Released (Note: Joined Luton Town on 12 January 2009.)		
15 January 2009	DF	(Guinea) Drissa Diallo	Released		

=== Loans in ===
Start date	Position	Name	From	End date	Ref.
4 August 2008	DF	(Jamaica) Shaun Cummings	Chelsea	End of season (Note: Originally until December, later extended until end of season.)	
11 September 2008	FW	(Republic of Ireland) Donal McDermott	Manchester City	11 October 2008	
1 October 2008	MF	(England) Luke Chadwick	Norwich City	1 January 2009 (Note: Loan move became permanent on 1 January 2009.)	
24 October 2008	MF	(England) Jason Puncheon	Plymouth Argyle	Unknown	
13 November 2008	MF	(England) Bondz N'Gala	West Ham United	13 December 2008	
12 January 2009	MF	(England) Jason Puncheon	Plymouth Argyle	End of season	
30 January 2009	DF	(Northern Ireland) Carl Magnay	Chelsea	Unknown	
25 March 2009	MF	(Republic of Ireland) Stephen Gleeson	Wolverhampton Wanderers	End of season	

=== Loans out ===
Start date	Position	Name	To	End date	Ref.
29 August 2008	MF	(England) Paul Mitchell	Barnet	September 2008	
