= Bondz N'Gala =

English footballer (born 1989)

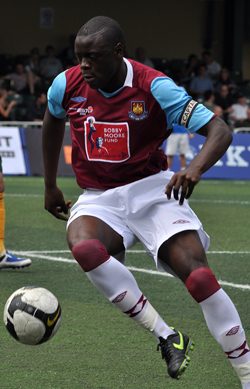
- N'Gala playing for West Ham United in 2009

Personal information
- Full name: Bondz Bondzanga N'Gala
- Date of birth: 13 September 1989 (age 37)
- Place of birth: Forest Gate, England
- Height: 6 ft 2 in (1.88 m)
- Position: Centre-back

Youth career
- 2006–2008: West Ham United

Senior career*
Years	Team	Apps	(Gls)
2008–2010	West Ham United	0	(0)
2008	→ Weymouth (loan)	2	(0)
2008	→ Milton Keynes Dons (loan)	3	(0)
2009	→ Scunthorpe United (loan)	2	(0)
2010	→ Plymouth Argyle (loan)	9	(0)
2010–2011	Plymouth Argyle	26	(1)
2011–2012	Yeovil Town	31	(2)
2012–2013	Stevenage	25	(0)
2013	→ Barnet (loan)	6	(0)
2013–2014	Portsmouth	27	(3)
2014–2016	Barnet	96	(2)
2016–2017	Eastleigh	9	(0)
2017	Dover Athletic	5	(0)
2017–2018	Dagenham & Redbridge	9	(0)
2017–2018	→ Leyton Orient (loan)	5	(1)
2018–2019	Crawley Town	13	(0)
2019	Ebbsfleet United	4	(0)
Total		272	(9)
- * Club domestic league appearances and goals

Bondz Bondzanga N'Gala (born 13 September 1989) is an English former professional footballer. He previously played for Plymouth Argyle, Yeovil Town, Barnet and Crawley Town.

== Club career ==
=== West Ham United ===
N'Gala began his career at West Ham United, joining the club at the age of 13 and progressing through the youth ranks, before signing a professional contract in 2008. N'Gala featured regularly in West Ham's reserve side for several seasons, including captaining the side on a number of occasions. In January 2008, N'Gala was loaned out to Conference National side Weymouth for the remainder of the 2007–08 campaign. He made his debut in Weymouth's 0–0 home draw with Kidderminster Harriers in the FA Trophy, and made two further appearances in defeats against Woking and Rushden & Diamonds. Although N'Gala's loan deal was supposed to run until the end of the season, he returned to West Ham a month into his loan agreement following a change of management at Weymouth. Ahead of the 2008–09 season, N'Gala travelled with the first-team squad on their pre-season tour of the US. Reserve team manager Alex Dyer stated a desire for the player to go out on loan to a Football League side during the season in order to gain match experience, and he was subsequently loaned out to Milton Keynes Dons in November 2008. During his one-month loan deal, N'Gala made three appearances, making his debut in a 3–0 victory over Walsall on 22 November 2008. He returned to his parent club in December 2008, and spent the rest of the season playing in the club's reserve side.

In September 2009, N'Gala made his first-team debut for West Ham, coming on as a 63rd-minute substitute in the club's 3–1 League Cup defeat away at Bolton Wanderers. It ultimately turned out to be his only first-team appearance for the club. A month later, he signed for Championship side Scunthorpe United on a one-month loan deal. He made his debut for Scunthorpe in a 4–1 away defeat to Blackpool, with N'Gala coming on as a second-half substitute in the match. N'Gala returned to West Ham at the end of November 2009, having made only two appearances for Scunthorpe. In March 2010, he was loaned out for a fourth time, this time signing for Championship club Plymouth Argyle on loan until the end of the 2009–10 season. He made his debut a week after signing, on 23 March, playing the whole match as a relegation threatened Plymouth secured an important 2–0 away victory over Ipswich Town. He made nine appearances during his loan spell, and was singled out for praise by Plymouth manager Paul Mariner, in a season that witnessed the club suffer relegation back to League One. N'Gala was released by West Ham at the end of the season, with the club opting against renewing his contract.

=== Plymouth Argyle ===
Following his release by West Ham, N'Gala joined Plymouth Argyle on a permanent basis in May 2010, signing a two-year contract. He played in the club's first game of the 2010–11 season, a 1–0 victory over Southampton at St Mary's. N'Gala received the first red card of his career in Plymouth's 3–2 home win against Sheffield Wednesday on 18 September 2010, being dismissed for bringing down Neil Mellor when through on goal. He scored his first professional goal in March 2011, netting the opening goal of the match with a "low drive" from just inside the area, in a 4–2 win over Sheffield Wednesday at Hillsborough. He made 28 appearances in all competitions during the campaign, scoring once, as Plymouth struggled with financial difficulties throughout the season — a season in which the PFA provided Plymouth players with "financial support" due to unpaid wages. Plymouth were deducted ten points by the Football League for an 'insolvency event', which breaks Football League sanctions and commands an automatic ten-point penalty, and the club were ultimately relegated for a second consecutive season.

=== Yeovil Town ===
Due to Plymouth entering administration, N'Gala was told he was free to leave the club. In July 2011, he subsequently signed for League One side Yeovil Town on a free transfer. He made his Yeovil debut in the club's 2–0 defeat to Brentford on the opening day of the 2011–12 season. N'Gala scored his first goal for the club in October 2011, scoring just before half-time when he headed in Ed Upson's inswinging corner in an eventual 2–2 draw with Leyton Orient. He doubled his goal tally for the campaign the following month, scoring the only goal of the game as Yeovil secured a 1–0 away victory at Hartlepool United. The goal came in similar fashion to his first for the club, with N'Gala heading in an Ed Upson corner. During his one season at Yeovil, N'Gala made 35 appearances in all competitions, scoring twice.

=== Stevenage ===
In July 2012, N'Gala signed for Stevenage for an undisclosed fee, signing a one-year contract with the club, with the option of another year. Stevenage manager Gary Smith stated he signed N'Gala on recommendation, after assistant manager Mark Newson had worked with the player during his time coaching at West Ham's academy. N'Gala made his debut in the club's first game of the 2012–13 season, playing the whole match in the centre of defence as Stevenage defeated AFC Wimbledon 3–1 in the League Cup.

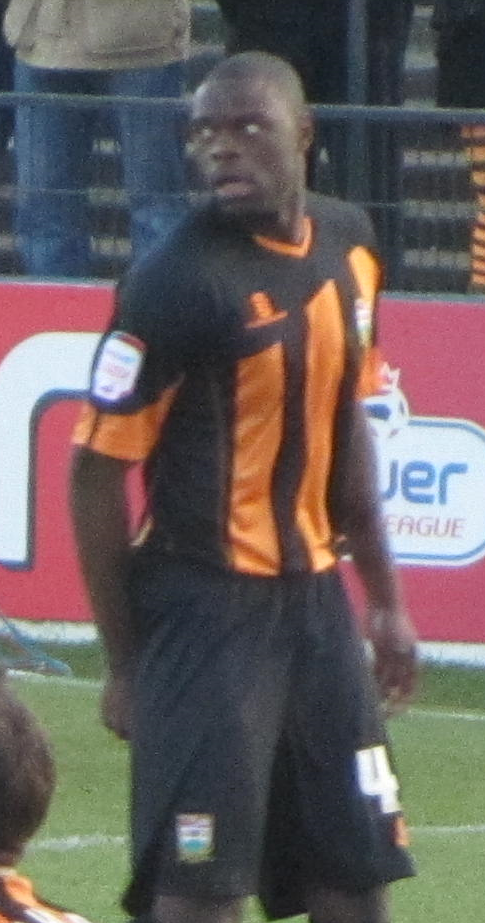
N'Gala playing for Barnet in 2013

Having appeared sporadically for Stevenage during the first half of the season, N'Gala joined Barnet on a one-month loan deal on 15 February 2013, in order to regain his match fitness. He made his debut a day later as an 80th-minute substitute for Chiró N'Toko in a 2–1 away win at York City, but was stretchered off with a head injury just a few minutes later. The injury required "a few stitches", but he returned to first-team action for Barnet's next game a week later, playing the whole match as Barnet kept a clean sheet in a draw with Rochdale. N'Gala went on to make six appearances during the brief loan spell, before being recalled by Stevenage on 13 March, due to injuries and suspensions within the first-team squad. On his return to his parent club, N'Gala played the whole match in Stevenage's 4–0 home victory over Sheffield United, helping the side keep an important clean sheet. He ended the season playing regularly in central defence, and made 28 appearances for Stevenage during the season. Despite his return to the first-team towards the end of the campaign, Stevenage opted against taking up the option of another year on N'Gala's contract, and he left the club when his contract expired in May 2013.

=== Portsmouth ===
On 2 August 2013, N'Gala signed a one-month deal with Portsmouth, extending this until January on 29 August. He made his debut in a League Cup defeat to Championship side Bournemouth, he scored his first goal in over two years and first goal for Pompey with a header from a Ricky Holmes corner on 5 October 2013, it came against Rochdale, he netted in the 52nd minute and then scored a second again from a Holmes corner just 14 minutes later, the match ended 3–0 to Pompey. He was not offered a new contract and left the club on 4 June 2014.

=== Barnet ===
N'Gala signed for Barnet on 16 July 2014. He played 107 times during this spell with the Bees, scoring two goals.

=== Eastleigh ===
On 22 November 2016, N'Gala signed for National League side Eastleigh on an 18-month deal, making his debut later that day against Aldershot Town. Just two months later he left the club by mutual consent.

=== Dover Athletic ===
On 2 February 2017, N'Gala seemingly signed for League One club Gillingham until the end of the 2016–17 season, however later the same day the deal fell through when the club became aware that regulations regarding the number of clubs for which a player can play in a single season meant that he was not eligible to play for them. A week later, N'Gala signed for Dover Athletic following talks with the FA and the EFL. He signed until the end of the season with an option for a longer deal upon his contract ending.

=== Dagenham & Redbridge ===
On 6 June 2017, N'Gala joined fellow National League side Dagenham & Redbridge on a two-year deal. On 25 May 2018 it was announced that his contract was mutually terminated and he left the club a year early.

=== Crawley Town ===
On 31 August 2018, following the departure of first-team manager, Harry Kewell, N'Gala joined Crawley Town on an initial one-month deal. He scored his first goal for Crawley in an EFL Trophy tie against Tottenham Hotspur Under 21s on 4 September 2018. On 15 September 2018, his contract was extended to the end of the season. He was released by the Reds at the end of the 2018–19 season having made 15 appearances for the club.

=== Ebbsfleet United ===
On 9 August 2019, N'Gala signed for Ebbsfleet United. N'Gala made his debut for United on 10 August, coming on as an 87th minute substitute against AFC Fylde.

== Personal life ==
N'Gala was born in Forest Gate, London. He is of Congolese descent. N'Gala supports West Ham United, and has done from a young age. He has stated that he has always aspired to play like Ledley King.

== Career statistics ==
As of match played 31 August 2019

Appearances and goals by club, season and competition
Club	Season	League			FA Cup		League Cup		Other		Total	
Club	Season	Division	Apps	Goals	Apps	Goals	Apps	Goals	Apps	Goals	Apps	Goals
West Ham United	2007–08	Premier League	0	0	0	0	0	0	—		0	0
West Ham United	2008–09	Premier League	0	0	0	0	0	0	—		0	0
West Ham United	2009–10	Premier League	0	0	0	0	1	0	—		1	0
West Ham United	Total		0	0	0	0	1	0	—		1	0
Weymouth (loan)	2007–08	Conference Premier	2	0	—		—		2 (Note: Appearances in FA Trophy)	0	4	0
Milton Keynes Dons (loan)	2008–09	League One	3	0	—		—		—		3	0
Scunthorpe United (loan)	2009–10	Championship	2	0	—		—		—		2	0
Plymouth Argyle (loan)	2009–10	Championship	9	0	—		—		—		9	0
Plymouth Argyle	2010–11	League One	26	1	0	0	0	0	2 (Note: Appearances in Football League Trophy)	0	28	1
Plymouth Argyle	Total		35	1	0	0	0	0	2	0	37	1
Yeovil Town	2011–12	League One	31	2	3	0	0	0	1	0	35	2
Stevenage	2012–13	League One	25	0	1	0	1	0	1	0	28	0
Barnet (loan)	2012–13	League Two	6	0	—		—		—		6	0
Portsmouth	2013–14	League Two	27	3	1	0	1	0	2	0	31	3
Barnet	2014–15	Conference Premier	44	1	3	0	—		0	0	47	1
Barnet	2015–16	League Two	42	1	2	0	2	0	0	0	46	1
Barnet	2016–17	League Two	10	0	1	0	1	0	2 (Note: Appearances in EFL Trophy)	0	14	0
Barnet	Total		96	2	6	0	3	0	2	0	107	2
Eastleigh	2016–17	National League	9	0	—		—		1	0	10	0
Dover Athletic	2016–17	National League	5	0	—		—		—		5	0
Dagenham & Redbridge	2017–18	National League	9	0	0	0	—		—		9	0
Leyton Orient (loan)	2017–18	National League	5	1	—		—		2	0	7	1
Crawley Town	2018–19	League Two	13	0	1	0	—		2	1	16	1
Ebbsfleet United	2019–20	National League	4	0	—		—		—		4	0
Career total			272	9	12	0	6	0	15	1	305	10

== Honours ==
Barnet

- Conference Premier: 2014–15
