= 2008–09 Leicester City F.C. season =

104th season in existence of Leicester City

Leicester City
2008–09 season
- Chairman: Milan Mandarić
- Manager: Nigel Pearson
- Stadium: Walkers Stadium
- Football League One: 1st
- FA Cup: Third round
- League Cup: Second round
- Football League Trophy: Northern quarter-final
- Top goalscorer: League: Matty Fryatt (27); All: Matty Fryatt (32)
- Highest home attendance: 30,542 (vs. Scunthorpe, league, 24 April)
- Lowest home attendance: 7,386 (vs. Stockport, League Cup, 12 August)
- Average home league attendance: 20,253
Home colours	Away colours	Third colours

The 2008–09 season was Leicester City F.C.'s 104th season in the English football league system and their first season in the third tier of English football, after being relegated to League One the previous season.

Under the stewardship of new manager Nigel Pearson (who managed to become the first Leicester manager in five years to last an entire season), Leicester comfortably took the League One title to earn instant promotion back to the Championship, which included a club record run of 23 games league unbeaten between 1 November and 7 March. Leicester also broke club records for the most points ever gained in a season (96), the most league wins ever gained in a season (27) and the fewest league defeats in a season (4), the latter record especially impressive considering the amount of league seasons Leicester have had to play fewer than 46 games.

Matty Fryatt also became the first Leicester player to score over 30 goals in one season since legendary striker Arthur Rowley, 52 years previously.

== Players ==
=== 2008-09 squad ===
Only includes players given a squad number. The squad listed is the squad which Leicester finished the season with.

Note: Flags indicate national team as defined under FIFA eligibility rules; some limited exceptions apply. Players may hold more than one non-FIFA nationality.

No.	Pos.	Nation	Player
1	GK	AUS	Paul Henderson
2	DF	ENG	Marc Edworthy
3	DF	AUS	Patrick Kisnorbo
4	DF	ENG	Kerrea Gilbert (on loan from Arsenal)
5	DF	BUL	Aleksandar Tunchev
6	MF	ENG	Stephen Clemence (captain)
7	MF	ENG	Tom Cleverley (on loan from Manchester United)
8	MF	ENG	Matthew Oakley (vice-captain)
9	FW	SCO	Steve Howard
10	FW	ENG	DJ Campbell
11	MF	ENG	Lloyd Dyer
12	FW	ENG	Matty Fryatt
13	GK	IRL	Conrad Logan
14	MF	AUS	James Wesolowski
15	DF	ENG	Michael Morrison
16	MF	WAL	Nicky Adams
17	DF	FRA	Bruno Ngotty
18	MF	ENG	Levi Porter
19	FW	JAM	Barry Hayles

No.	Pos.	Nation	Player
20	DF	ENG	Harry Worley
21	FW	ENG	Ashley Chambers
22	MF	CIV	Max Gradel
23	DF	ENG	Joe Mattock
24	MF	WAL	Andy King
25	DF	ENG	Jack Hobbs (on loan from Liverpool)
26	GK	ENG	David Martin (on loan from Liverpool)
27	FW	SCO	Paul Dickov
28	DF	ENG	Luke O'Neill
29	DF	ENG	Chris Powell
30	FW	ENG	Craig King
31	DF	SUI	Bruno Berner
32	GK	AUS	Alex Cisak
34	MF	ENG	Aman Verma
35	GK	ENG	Carl Pentney
36	DF	ENG	Wayne Brown (on loan from Hull City)
37	GK	ENG	David Stockdale (on loan from Fulham)
38	GK	TRI	Tony Warner (on loan from Hull City)
39	MF	SWE	Astrit Ajdarević (on loan from Liverpool)

== Kit and sponsorship ==
Leicester City retained the previous season's home kit. A yellow away kit and a black third kit were also used.

The kits were produced by German company Jako and sponsored by British company Topps Tiles.

== Pre-season friendlies ==
The Leicester City players reported back for Pre-Season on 1 July 2008. They played the following Friendlies:

12 July 2008 1	Hinckley United	4–5	Leicester City	Hinckley
	Murphy; Webster	(Report)	Howard; Adams; Gradel; Fryatt; Chambers	Stadium: Marsdon's Stadium; Attendance: 3,231

16 July 2008 2	Olimpija Ljubljana	2–2	Leicester City	Slovenia
	Rudonja; O.G	(Report)	Fryatt; Campbell

22 July 2008 3	Luton Town	1–1	Leicester City	Luton
	Spring	(Report)	Dyer	Stadium: Kenilworth Road; Attendance: 1,934; Referee: K Friend

24 July 2008 4	Quorn	4–8	Leicester City XI	Quorn
	Jenkins; Hearn; Turner	(Report)	Malenovic (Trialist); Sappleton (p); Odhiambo; King; McKay

26 July 2008 5	Kettering Town	1–4	Leicester City	Kettering
	Solkhan	(Report)	Fryatt; Adams; Campbell	Stadium: Rockingham Road; Referee: A Woolmer

29 July 2008 6	Leicester City	2–3	Birmingham City	Leicester
	Fryatt; Porter	(Report)	Larsson; Phillips	Stadium: Walkers Stadium; Attendance: 6,354; Referee: T Kettle

30 July 2008 7	Ilkeston Town	2–4	Leicester City XI	Ilkeston
	Howell	(Report)	King; McKay; Porter	Stadium: New Manor Ground; Attendance: 431

2 August 2008 8	Crystal Palace	1–1	Leicester City	London
	Moses	(Report)	Oakley	Stadium: Selhurst Park; Attendance: 1,993; Referee: P Crossley

== Transfers ==
=== In ===
Date	Pos.	Nat.	Name	From	Fee
1 July 2008	DF	(England)	Michael Morrison	(England) Cambridge United	Undisclosed
1 July 2008	MF	(England)	Lloyd Dyer	(England) Milton Keynes Dons	Free
1 July 2008	MF	(Wales)	Nicky Adams	(England) Bury	£100,000
7 July 2008	DF	(Bulgaria)	Aleksander Tunchev	(Bulgaria) CSKA Sofia	£850,000
7 August 2008	FW	(Scotland)	Paul Dickov	(England) Manchester City	Free
23 August 2008	DF	(England)	Chris Powell	(England) Charlton Athletic	Free

=== Out ===
Date	Pos.	Nat.	Name	To	Fee
1 July 2008	DF	(Northern Ireland)	Gareth McAuley	(England) Ipswich Town	Undisclosed
1 July 2008	DF	(England)	Richard Stearman	(England) Wolverhampton Wanderers	Undisclosed
1 July 2008	FW	(Canada)	Iain Hume	(England) Barnsley	£1,200,000
1 July 2008	GK	(Scotland)	Rab Douglas	(Scotland) Dundee	Free
1 July 2008	DF	(Republic of Ireland)	Alan Sheehan	(England) Leeds United	Free
21 July 2008	MF	(England)	Louis Dodds	(England) Port Vale	Free
30 July 2008	MF	(Netherlands)	Sergio Hellings	(Netherlands) K.V.C. Westerlo	Free
5 August 2008	DF	(England)	James Chambers	(England) Doncaster Rovers	Free
19 December 2008	DF	(Bulgaria)	Radostin Kishishev	(Bulgaria) PFC Litex Lovech	Free
30 January 2009	FW	(England)	Eric Odhiambo	(Scotland) Inverness Caledonian Thistle	Free

=== Loans in ===
Date from	Date to	Pos.	Nat.	Name	From
10 July 2008	End of season	DF	(England)	Kerrea Gilbert	(England) Arsenal
1 August 2008	End of season	DF	(England)	Jack Hobbs	(England) Liverpool
4 August 2008	End of season	GK	(England)	David Martin	(England) Liverpool
27 November 2008	26 January 2009	MF	(England)	Mark Davies	(England) Wolverhampton Wanderers
17 January 2009	End of season	MF	(England)	Tom Cleverley	(England) Manchester United
30 January 2009	End of season	DF	(England)	Wayne Brown	(England) Hull City
16 February 2009	1 March 2009	GK	(England)	Mark Bunn	(England) Blackburn Rovers
3 March 2009	End of season	GK	(England)	David Stockdale	(England) Fulham
13 March 2009	End of season	GK	(Trinidad and Tobago)	Tony Warner	(England) Hull City
26 March 2009	End of season	MF	(Sweden)	Astrit Ajdarevic	(England) Liverpool

=== Loans out ===
Date from	Date to	Pos.	Nat.	Name	From
12 August 2008	12 September 2008	FW	(Jamaica)	Ricky Sappleton	(England) Bournemouth
12 August 2008	12 October 2008	FW	(Jamaica)	Barry Hayles	(England) Cheltenham Town
21 August 2008	1 January 2009	GK	(Republic of Ireland)	Conrad Logan	(England) Luton Town
18 September 2008	23 November 2009	MF	(England)	Harry Worley	(England) Luton Town
26 September 2008	2 November 2008	MF	(France)	Bruno Ngotty	(England) Hereford United
2 October 2008	2 November 2008	MF	(Australia)	James Wesolowski	(England) Cheltenham Town
20 October 2008	20 November 2008	DF	(England)	Lathaniel Rowe-Turner	(England) Cheltenham Town
23 October 2008	23 November 2008	GK	(England)	Carl Pentney	(England) Woking
24 October 2008	1 February 2009	MF	(England)	Jonathan Hayes	(England) Cheltenham Town
27 November 2008	27 December 2008	FW	(England)	Eric Odhiambo	(England) Brentford
27 November 2008	31 December 2008	FW	(Jamaica)	Barry Hayles	(England) Cheltenham Town
1 January 2009	End of season	FW	(Jamaica)	Ricky Sappleton	(England) Oxford United
8 January 2009	End of season	FW	(England)	DJ Campbell	(England) Blackpool
19 January 2009	End of season	MF	(Wales)	Nicky Adams	(England) Rochdale
3 February 2009	End of season	MF	(Australia)	James Wesolowski	(Scotland) Dundee United
27 March 2009	End of season	GK	(Republic of Ireland)	Conrad Logan	(England) Stockport County

== Results ==
=== Football League One ===
- Leicester City scores given first

Game	Date	Venue	Opponents	Score	Scorers	Attendance	Points	Position	Report
1	9 August 2008	Home	Milton Keynes Dons	2–0	Fryatt 24, 83(p)	23,351	3	4th	LCFC.com
2	16 August 2008	Away	Stockport County	0–0		7,151	4	3rd	LCFC.com
3	23 August 2008	Home	Tranmere Rovers	3–1	Howard 33, Fryatt 52, 90+4	17,798	7	2nd	LCFC.com
4	30 August 2008	Away	Cheltenham Town	4–0	Dyer 3, 80, Oakley 54, Fryatt 77	5,344	10	1st	LCFC.com
5	13 September 2008	Home	Millwall	0–1		19,591	10	6th	LCFC.com
6	20 September 2008	Home	Leyton Orient	3–1	Dyer 11, Fryatt 87, King 90	6,448	13	5th	LCFC.com
7	27 September 2008	Home	Hartlepool United	1–0	Oakley 3	18,578	16	4th	LCFC.com
8	30 September 2008	Away	Colchester United	1–0	Dyer 49	5,133	19	1st	LCFC.com
9	4 October 2008	Away	Huddersfield Town	3–2	Fryatt 50, 65(p), Dyer 90+1	16,212	22	1st	LCFC.com
–	11 October 2008	Home	Yeovil Town	P–P^{1}		–	–	–	–
10	18 October 2008	Away	Oldham Athletic	1–1	Howard 54	8,901	23	2nd	LCFC.com
11	21 October 2008	Home	Walsall	2–2	King 34, Tunchev 73	17,178	24	3rd	LCFC.com
12	25 October 2008	Home	Northampton Town	0–0		22,795	25	4th	LCFC.com
13	28 October 2008	Away	Brighton & Hove Albion	2–3	Fryatt 35, 42	6,282	25	6th	LCFC.com
14	1 November 2008	Home	Bristol Rovers	2–1	Fryatt 87, 90+4	18,941	28	5th	LCFC.com
15	11 November 2008	Home	Yeovil Town	1–0	Dyer 25	16,528	31	1st	LCFC.com
16	15 November 2008	Away	Swindon Town	2–2	Oakley 57, Fryatt 74	9,499	32	2nd	LCFC.com
17	22 November 2008	Away	Scunthorpe United	2–1	Dyer 22, King 81	7,967	35	1st	LCFC.com
18	25 November 2008	Home	Crewe Alexandra	2–1	Fryatt 15, King 72	16,961	38	1st	LCFC.com
19	6 December 2008	Home	Southend United	3–0	Fryatt 6, 76, 80(p)	16,836	41	1st	LCFC.com
20	13 December 2008	Away	Carlisle United	2–1	King 60, Berner 69^{2}	7,058	44	1st	LCFC.com
21	20 December 2008	Home	Peterborough United	4–0	O.G. 6, Fryatt 38, King 70, Howard 90	23,390	47	1st	LCFC.com
22	26 December 2008	Away	Leeds United	1–1	Oakley 24	33,580	48	1st	LCFC.com
23	28 December 2008	Home	Hereford United	2–1	Howard 9, King 71	22,920	51	1st	LCFC.com
24	10 January 2009	Home	Leyton Orient	3–0	Oakley 9, Davies 37, Dickov(p) 87	18,240	54	1st	LCFC.com
25	19 January 2009	Away	Yeovil Town	2–0	Howard 57, Mattock 88	4,569	57	1st	LCFC.com
26	24 January 2009	Home	Huddersfield Town	4–2	Morrison 11, Berner 59, Fryatt 63, Hobbs 73	21,311	60	1st	LCFC.com
27	27 January 2009	Home	Brighton & Hove Albion	0–0		17,410	61	1st	LCFC.com
28	31 January 2009	Away	Northampton Town	2–1	Howard 21(p), Dyer 73	7,028	64	1st	LCFC.com
29	3 February 2009	Away	Walsall	4–1	Fryatt 12, King 34, Cleverley 47, Howard 52	5,634	67	1st	LCFC.com
30	7 February 2009	Home	Oldham Athletic	0–0		22,328	68	1st	LCFC.com
31	14 February 2009	Home	Swindon Town	1–1	King 86	19,926	69	1st	LCFC.com
32	17 February 2009	Away	Hartlepool United	2–2	Howard 28, 80(p)	4,068	70	1st	LCFC.com
33	21 February 2009	Away	Bristol Rovers	1–0	Fryatt 20	9,138	73	1st	LCFC.com
34	28 February 2009	Away	Milton Keynes Dons	2–2	Fryatt 5, Gradel 90+7	17,717	74	1st	LCFC.com
35	3 March 2009	Home	Stockport County	1–1	Gilbert 2	16,378	75	1st	LCFC.com
36	7 March 2009	Home	Cheltenham Town	4–0	Howard 15, Fryatt 22, Cleverley 67, Oakley 70	18,939	78	1st	LCFC.com
37	11 March 2009	Away	Tranmere Rovers	0–2		6,032	78	1st	LCFC.com
38	14 March 2009	Away	Millwall	1–0	Howard 22	13,261	81	1st	LCFC.com
39	21 March 2009	Home	Colchester United	1–1	Dickov 67	20,218	82	1st	LCFC.com
40	28 March 2009	Away	Peterborough United	0–2		14,110	82	1st	LCFC.com
41	4 April 2009	Home	Carlisle United	2–2	Oakley 52, Fryatt 88	20,159	83	1st	LCFC.com
42	11 April 2009	Away	Hereford United	3–1	Oakley 35, Dyer 74, Howard 86	4,389	86	1st	LCFC.com
43	13 April 2009	Home	Leeds United	1–0	Howard 90+2	25,507	89	1st	LCFC.com
44	18 April 2009	Away	Southend United	2–0	Fryatt 60(p), 70	10,089	92	1st	LCFC.com
45	24 April 2009	Home	Scunthorpe United	2–2	Morrison 16, 77	30,542	93	1st	LCFC.com
46	2 May 2009	Away	Crewe Alexandra	3–0	Berner 56, Dyer 66, Fryatt 68	6,982	96	1st	LCFC.com

^{1} - Match postponed due to International call-ups.
^{2} - In some match reports, this goal is mistakenly awarded to Mark Davies

=== FA Cup ===
- Leicester City scores given first

Round	Date	Venue	Opponents	Score	Scorers	Attendance	Report
R1	8 November 2008	Home	Stevenage Borough	3–0	Dyer 37, Fryatt 52, King 69	7,586	LCFC.com
R2	29 November 2008	Home	Dagenham & Redbridge	3–2	Fryatt 11, 30(p), 55	7,791	LCFC.com
R3	3 January 2009	Home	Crystal Palace	0–0		15,976	LCFC.com
R3 Replay	3 January 2009	Away	Crystal Palace	1–2	Gradel 90+4	6,023	LCFC.com

=== Football League Cup ===
- Leicester City scores given first

Round	Date	Venue	Opponents	Score	Scorers	Attendance	Report
R1	12 August 2008	Home	Stockport County	1–0	Howard 36	7,386	LCFC.com
R2	27 August 2008	Away	Fulham	2–3	Dickov 46, King 48	7,386	LCFC.com

=== Football League Trophy ===
- Leicester City scores given first

Round	Date	Venue	Opponents	Score	Scorers	Attendance	Report
R1 N	2 September 2008	Away	Hartlepool United	3–0	Howard 52, Adams 66, Fryatt 87	2,807	LCFC.com
R2 N	23 September 2008	Home	Lincoln City	0–0^{1}		8,046	LCFC.com
QF N	4 November 2008	Away	Rotherham United	0–2		4,255	LCFC.com

^{1} Leicester won 3–1 on penalties.

== Awards ==
=== Club awards ===
At the end of the season, Leicester's annual award ceremony including categories voted for by the players and backroom staff, the supporters and the supporters club, saw the following players recognised for their achievements for the club throughout the 2009–10 season.

Player of the Season Award	(Scotland) Steve Howard
Young Player of the Season Award	(Wales) Andy King
Players' Player of the Season Award	(England) Matty Fryatt
Supporters' Club Player of the Season Award	(England) Matty Fryatt
Academy Player of the Season Award	(Republic of Ireland) Cian Bolger
Goal of the Season Award	(England) Matt Oakley vs Cheltenham Town (7.3.2009)

=== Divisional awards ===
Date	Award	Winner
August 2008	League One Manager of the Month	(England) Nigel Pearson
December 2008	League One Manager of the Month	(England) Nigel Pearson
December 2008	League One Player of the Month	(England) Matty Fryatt
Season	League One Player of the Year	(England) Matty Fryatt
Season	League One PFA Team of the Year	(England) Jack Hobbs
Season	League One PFA Team of the Year	(England) Matt Oakley
Season	League One PFA Team of the Year	(England) Matty Fryatt

== League One statistics ==
=== League One table ===
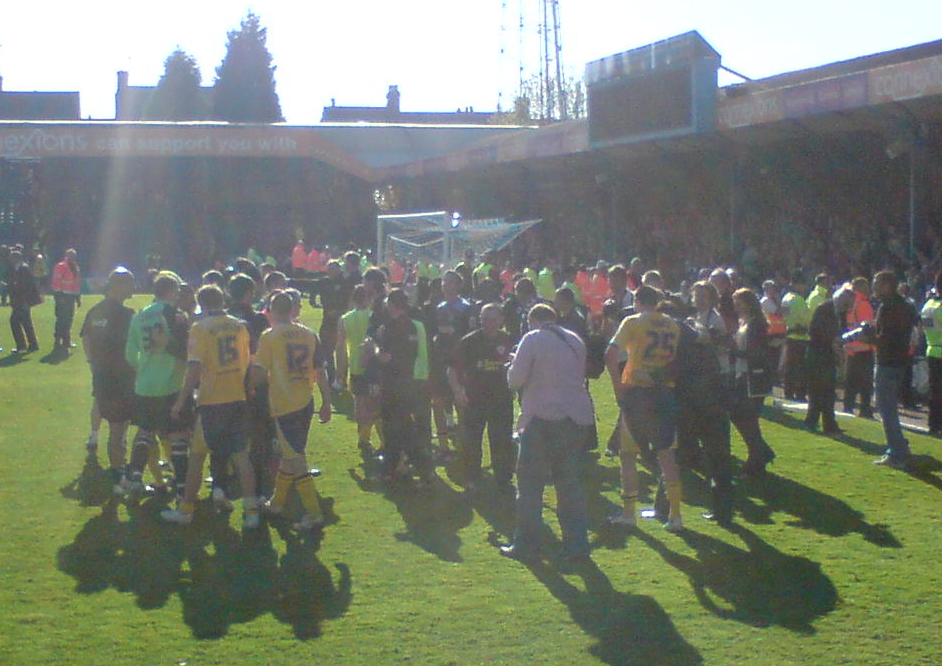
Leicester celebrate their promotion as champions of League One with a win at Southend.

Pos	Team	Pld	W	D	L	GF	GA	GD	Pts	Promotion or relegation
1	Leicester City (C, P)	46	27	15	4	84	39	+45	96	Promotion to Football League Championship
2	Peterborough United (P)	46	26	11	9	78	54	+24	89	Promotion to Football League Championship
3	Milton Keynes Dons	46	26	9	11	83	47	+36	87	Qualification for League One play-offs
4	Leeds United	46	26	6	14	77	49	+28	84	Qualification for League One play-offs
5	Millwall	46	25	7	14	63	53	+10	82	Qualification for League One play-offs

Updated to match(es) played on 2 May 2009. Source: The Football League
Rules for classification: 1) points; 2) goal difference; 3) number of goals scored.
(C) Champions; (P) Promoted

=== Club standings ===
Overall								Home						Away					
Pld	W	D	L	GF	GA	GD	Pts	W	D	L	GF	GA	GD	W	D	L	GF	GA	GD
46	27	15	4	84	39	+45	96	13	9	1	41	16	+25	14	6	3	43	23	+20

Last updated: 2 May 2009.
Source: LCFC League One Results

== Club statistics ==
=== Appearances ===
No.	Nat.	Name	FL1	Cups	Total
1	(Australia)	Paul Henderson	6	4	10
2	(England)	Marc Edworthy	5	3	8
3	(Australia)	Patrick Kisnorbo	5 (3)	2	7 (3)
4	(England)	Kerrea Gilbert	33 (1)	4 (1)	37 (2)
5	(Bulgaria)	Aleksander Tunchev	19 (1)	6	25 (1)
7	(Bulgaria)	Radostin Kishishev	0	1	1
7	(England)	Tom Cleverley	10 (5)	0	10 (5)
8	(England)	Matt Oakley	45	3	48
9	(Scotland)	Steve Howard	40 (1)	9 (1)	49 (2)
10	(England)	DJ Campbell	2 (5)	1 (3)	3 (8)
11	(England)	Lloyd Dyer	43 (1)	7	50 (1)
12	(England)	Matty Fryatt	46	4 (2)	50 (2)
14	(Australia)	James Wesolowski	0	4	4
15	(England)	Michael Morrison	32 (3)	6 (2)	38 (5)
16	(Wales)	Nicky Adams	4 (8)	5 (1)	9 (9)
18	(England)	Levi Porter	1	0 (1)	1 (1)
19	(Jamaica)	Barry Hayles	1 (9)	1	2 (9)
21	(England)	Ashley Chambers	0 (1)	0 (2)	0 (3)
22	(Ivory Coast)	Max Gradel	16 (11)	3 (2)	19 (13)
23	(England)	Joe Mattock	25 (6)	5	30 (6)
24	(Wales)	Andy King	45	8 (1)	53 (1)
25	(England)	Jack Hobbs	39 (5)	5	44 (5)
26	(England)	David Martin	25	5	30
27	(Scotland)	Paul Dickov	4 (16)	3 (3)	7 (19)
28	(England)	Luke O'Neill	0	1	1
29	(England)	Chris Powell	12 (5)	3 (2)	15 (7)
30	(England)	Craig King	0	0 (1)	0 (1)
31	(Switzerland)	Bruno Berner	21 (11)	5 (1)	26 (12)
33	(England)	Mark Davies	5 (2)	1 (1)	6 (3)
33	(England)	Mark Bunn	3	0	3
35	(England)	Carl Pentney	0 (1)	0	0 (1)
36	(England)	Wayne Brown	7 (2)	0	7 (2)
37	(England)	David Stockdale	8	0	8
38	(Trinidad and Tobago)	Tony Warner	4	0	4
39	(Sweden)	Astrit Ajdarevic	0 (5)	0	0 (5)

Note: Subs in brackets.

=== Top scorers ===
- Note: In some records, Bruno Berner's goal vs. Carlisle United on 13 December 2008 is mistakenly recorded as being scored by Mark Davies.

Pos.	Nat.	Player	FL1	Cups	Total
1	(England)	Matty Fryatt	27	5	32
2	(Scotland)	Steve Howard	13	2	15
3	(Wales)	Andy King	9	2	11
4	(England)	Lloyd Dyer	10	1	11
5	(England)	Matt Oakley	8	0	8
6	(Scotland)	Paul Dickov	2	1	3
=	(England)	Michael Morrison	3	0	3
=	(Switzerland)	Bruno Berner	3	0	3
9	(England)	Tom Cleverley	2	0	2
=	(Ivory Coast)	Max Gradel	1	1	2
11	(England)	Joe Mattock	1	0	1
=	(England)	Mark Davies	1	0	1
=	(England)	Jack Hobbs	1	0	1
=	(Wales)	Nicky Adams	0	1	1
=	(Bulgaria)	Aleksandar Tunchev	1	0	1
=	(England)	Kerrea Gilbert	1	0	1

=== Most assists ===
Pos.	Nat.	Player	FL1	Cups	Total
1	(Scotland)	Steve Howard	14	0	14
2	(England)	Lloyd Dyer	9	1	10
3	(England)	Matty Fryatt	8	1	9
4	(Ivory Coast)	Max Gradel	6	1	7
5	(England)	Matt Oakley	6	0	6
6	(Wales)	Andy King	4	1	5
7	(Wales)	Nicky Adams	3	1	4
8	(England)	Tom Cleverley	3	0	3
=	(England)	Jack Hobbs	3	0	3
=	(Scotland)	Paul Dickov	2	1	3
11	(England)	Joe Mattock	1	1	2
12	(England)	Ashley Chambers	0	1	1
=	(Australia)	James Wesolowski	0	1	1
=	(England)	DJ Campbell	0	1	1
=	(England)	Mark Davies	1	0	1
=	(Jamaica)	Barry Hayles	1	0	1

=== Disciplinary record ===
Nat.	Player	Booked	Sent off (straight red)
(England)	Jack Hobbs	2	1
(Scotland)	Steve Howard	10	0
(Ivory Coast)	Max Gradel	7	0
(England)	Matty Fryatt	6	0
(Switzerland)	Bruno Berner	4	0
(England)	Matt Oakley	4	0
(England)	Michael Morrison	4	0
(Bulgaria)	Aleksandar Tunchev	3	0
(Scotland)	Paul Dickov	3	0
(England)	Joe Mattock	3	0
(Jamaica)	Barry Hayles	3	0
(Wales)	Nicky Adams	2	0
(England)	Kerrea Gilbert	2	0
(Wales)	Andy King	2	0
(England)	Lloyd Dyer	2	0
(England)	Mark Davies	2	0
(England)	Chris Powell	1	0
(England)	Tom Cleverley	1	0
(England)	Wayne Brown	1	0

All Stats obtained from LCFC.com
