= 2007 Victory Shield =

The Victory Shield 2007 was the 62nd edition of the Victory Shield, an annual football tournament competed for by the Under 16 level teams of England, Scotland, Northern Ireland and Wales. It was held from 5 October to 29 November 2007 and was won by England.

== Venues ==
Country	Stadium	Capacity
England	Bloomfield Road	9,612
England	New Bucks Head	6,300
Northern Ireland	Ballymena Showgrounds	5,200
Scotland	Falkirk Stadium	8,000
Wales	Richmond Park	3,000

== Final table ==
Teams	GP	W	D	L	GF	GA	GD	Pts
England	3	2	1	0	6	3	3	7
Northern Ireland	3	1	1	1	4	5	-1	4
Scotland	3	1	0	2	4	4	0	3
Wales	3	1	0	2	1	3	-2	3

== Matches and Results ==
October 5, 2007

Wales	1 – 0	Scotland
Lee McArdle

Richmond Park, Carmarthen

October 11, 2007

England	2 – 2	Northern Ireland
Jonjo Shelvey; Jason Banton		Shane Duffy (p); Cormac Burke

Bloomfield Road, Blackpool

November 2, 2007

England	2 – 0	Wales
Jonjo Shelvey; Jose Baxter

New Bucks Head, Telford

November 8, 2007

Northern Ireland	1 – 3	Scotland
James Douglas		Ryan Jack; James Keatings (2)

Ballymena Showgrounds, Ballymena

November 23, 2007

Wales	0 – 1	Northern Ireland
		Robbie Hume

Richmond Park, Carmarthen

November 29, 2007

Scotland	1 – 2	England
Kal Naismith		Jonjo Shelvey; Jose Baxter

Falkirk Stadium, Falkirk

== Result ==
2007 Victory Shield winners

England
