= Cyril Davies (footballer) =

Welsh footballer

Personal information
- Date of birth: 7 September 1948 (age 78)
- Place of birth: Swansea, Wales
- Height: 1.70 m (5 ft 7 in)
- Position: Midfielder

Senior career*
Years	Team	Apps	(Gls)
1966–1968	Swansea Town	0	(0)
1968–1969	Carlisle United	2	(0)
1969–1970	Yeovil Town	?	(?)
1970–1973	Charlton Athletic	76	(5)
1974–1975	Tonbridge Angels	?	(?)
Total		78	(5)

International career
	Wales U23	4	(0)
1971	Wales	1	(0)
- * Club domestic league appearances and goals as of 14:34, 16 August 2010 (UTC)

Cyril Davies (born 7 September 1948) is a Welsh international footballer who played as a midfielder in the English Football League.

After dropping out of the football league, Davies starred for Yeovil Town in the FA Cup which brought him to the attention of Charlton Athletic. His professional career was ended by a knee injury at age 25 and he returned to amateur football.

== International career ==
Davies made his solitary Wales appearance in a Euro 1972 qualifying match in Bucharest against Romania. He came on at half time as a replacement for Mick Hill, who was winning his second cap. Neither player represented their country again.
