= Alistair Slowe =

English footballer (born 1988)

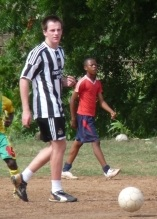
- Slowe playing in Ghana

Personal information
- Full name: Alistair Malcolm George Slowe
- Date of birth: 16 October 1988 (age 38)
- Place of birth: Brighton, England
- Position: Right midfielder

Youth career
- 2000–2002: Brighton & Hove Albion

Senior career*
Years	Team	Apps	(Gls)
2006–2008	Cantonments FC	46	(5)
2008–2010	Onisilos Sotira	44	(3)
2010–2011	Northampton Town	0	(0)
2011–2012	Yeovil Town	0	(0)
2012–2014	Achyronas Liopetriou	56	(4)
2014–2016	Ayia Napa	36	(1)
2016–2017	Anagennisi Deryneia	16	(0)
2017	Ayia Napa	24	(1)
Total		222	(14)
- * Club domestic league appearances and goals

Alistair Malcolm George Slowe (born 16 October 1988) is an English former footballer.

== Club career ==
Slowe started his career as a youth player at Brighton & Hove Albion, however he left to focus on school work and exams. At the age of 17, he headed to Ghana to pursue his footballing career after not attaining the grades he wanted. He helped found the Cantonments Soccer Academy in 2006, and spent two seasons with the first team.

In 2008, he was offered a contract with Cypriot side Onisilos Sotira, having impressed two Newcastle United scouts who happened to be in Ghana at the time. He spent two seasons with Sotira, before being offered trials with English sides AFC Wimbledon and Gillingham. As he was still under contract in Cyprus, he was not allowed to accept these trial offers. He was also offered a trial with Newcastle, but due to the Icelandic volcanic eruption of 2010, he had to travel for 4 days to reach England. He was injured in his first training session, and ultimately was not selected for the team.

Slowe joined Northampton Town in 2010, but despite making the bench a number of times, he never made a first team appearance and was released the next year. Slowe became a cult hit on the Northampton Town forum "The Hotel End", with posts on one thread reaching 36 pages over eight years.

He then joined Yeovil Town, but again failed to make a first team appearance in his one season there.

He then returned to Cyprus with Achyronas Liopetriou, on loan from Omonia Nicosia, before signing with Ayia Napa, where he made thirty six appearances. He joined Anagennisi Deryneia in 2016 before rejoining Ayia Napa again in 2017 where he ended his career at the end of the 2017/18 season.
