= Kerrea Gilbert =

English footballer (born 1987)

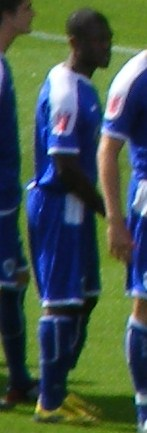
- Gilbert playing for Leicester City in 2008

Personal information
- Full name: Kerrea Kuche Gilbert
- Date of birth: 28 February 1987 (age 39)
- Place of birth: Willesden, England
- Height: 5 ft 6 in (1.68 m)
- Position: Right back

Youth career
- 2003–2005: Arsenal

Senior career*
Years	Team	Apps	(Gls)
2005–2010	Arsenal	2	(0)
2006–2007	→ Cardiff City (loan)	24	(0)
2007–2008	→ Southend United (loan)	5	(0)
2008–2009	→ Leicester City (loan)	34	(1)
2010	→ Peterborough United (loan)	10	(0)
2011–2012	Yeovil Town	8	(0)
2012	Shamrock Rovers	15	(0)
2013	Maidenhead United	0	(0)
2014	St Albans City	15	(2)
Total		112	(3)

International career
2002–2003	England U16	6	(0)
2003–2004	England U17	5	(0)
- * Club domestic league appearances and goals

Kerrea Kuche Gilbert (born 28 February 1987) is an English former professional footballer who played as a right back.

== Career ==
=== Arsenal ===
Gilbert was born in Willesden, London, and until the 2005–06 season he usually played in Arsenal's youth and reserve teams. However, after injuries to various members of Arsenal's defence, Gilbert was drafted in as cover. He made his first team debut on 29 November 2005 against Reading in the League Cup, and on 7 December he played in a UEFA Champions League match against Ajax Amsterdam, coming on as a substitute at left back for the injured Lauren.

With Arsenal's injury problems continuing, he started in Arsenal's FA Cup win over Cardiff City on 7 January 2006, in which he was noted for his pace, which was the start of a six-match run of appearances. He made his Premier League debut on 21 January 2006 in a 1–0 away loss at Everton.

On 21 July 2006, Gilbert was loaned to Championship team Cardiff City for the 2006–07 season.

He joined Southend United on a six-month loan deal on 30 July 2007. He made six appearances for Southend before falling out of favour with manager Steve Tilson. He returned to Arsenal on 3 January 2008.

On 10 July 2008, Gilbert joined Leicester City on a season-long loan deal for 2008–09. He scored his first league goal for Leicester in a 1–1 draw with Stockport County.

On 15 January 2010, Gilbert joined Championship side Peterborough United on loan until the end of the season.

=== Portland Timbers ===
On 13 December 2010, Gilbert signed with the Portland Timbers, of Major League Soccer; however, as of March 2011, visa issues prohibited him from obtaining a work permit in the United States and his future with the club remained in question. The Timbers announced on 18 March 2011 that Gilbert's P-1 visa had been denied and that they had given up trying to bring the defender to Portland.

=== Yeovil Town ===
Gilbert was offered a 6-month deal at Football League One side, Yeovil Town, after impressing manager Terry Skiverton during pre-season, despite only appearing once in this time. Gilbert's signing came after a long period of time due to the contract confusions with Portland Timbers. Gilbert made his first League appearance for the Glovers on 13 August, during their 3–1 victory over Oldham Athletic, in which Gilbert played 76 minutes before being substituted off. Gilbert was released at the end of his contract in January 2012 after 9 matches for Yeovil Town.

=== Later career ===
On 1 February 2012, Gilbert signed for League of Ireland champions Shamrock Rovers for the 2012 season.

On 21 March 2013, he signed for Conference South side Maidenhead United along with ex-QPR trainee Romone Rose.

Gilbert signed for St Albans City on 10 January 2014, and helped them earn promotion to Conference South, though he wasn't involved in the club's successful playoff campaign. He left the Saints by mutual consent at the end of the season.

== International career ==
Gilbert made six appearances for the England under-16 side between 2002 and 2003, scoring once. He featured in the Victory Shield, Walkers International Tournament and in the Tournoi de Montaigu. He made five appearances for the England under-17 side between 2003 and 2004, playing in the Pepsi International Tournament and the 2004 UEFA European Under-17 Championship qualifiers.

== Career statistics ==
Appearances and goals by club, season and competition
Club	Season	League			National Cup		League Cup		Europe		Other		Total	
Club	Season	Division	Apps	Goals	Apps	Goals	Apps	Goals	Apps	Goals	Apps	Goals	Apps	Goals
Arsenal	2005–06	Premier League	2	0	2	0	4	0	1 (Note: Appearances in Champions League)	0	0	0	9	0
Arsenal	2007–08	Premier League	0	0	0	0	0	0	0	0	―		0	0
Arsenal	2009–10	Premier League	0	0	0	0	2	0	1	0	―		3	0
Arsenal	Total		2	0	2	0	6	0	2	0	0	0	12	0
Cardiff City (loan)	2006–07	Championship	24	0	2	0	0	0	―		―		26	0
Southend United (loan)	2007–08	League One	5	0	0	0	1	0	―		―		6	0
Leicester City (loan)	2008–09	League One	34	1	2	0	2	0	―		1 (Note: Appearance in Football League Trophy)	0	39	1
Peterborough United (loan)	2009–10	Championship	10	0	0	0	―		―		―		10	0
Yeovil Town	2011–12	League One	8	0	0	0	0	0	―		1	0	9	0
Shamrock Rovers	2012	League of Ireland Premier Division	14	0	2	0	3	0	0	0	1 (Note: Appearance in Setanta Sports Cup)	0	20	0
St Albans City	2013–14	Southern League Premier Division	15	2	―		―		―		1 (Note: Appearance in Herts Senior Cup)	0	16	2
Career total			112	3	8	0	12	0	2	0	4	0	138	3

== Honours ==
Leicester City

- Football League One: 2008–09

Shamrock Rovers

- Leinster Senior Cup: 2012
