= Abdulai Bell-Baggie =

Sierra Leonean footballer (born 1992)

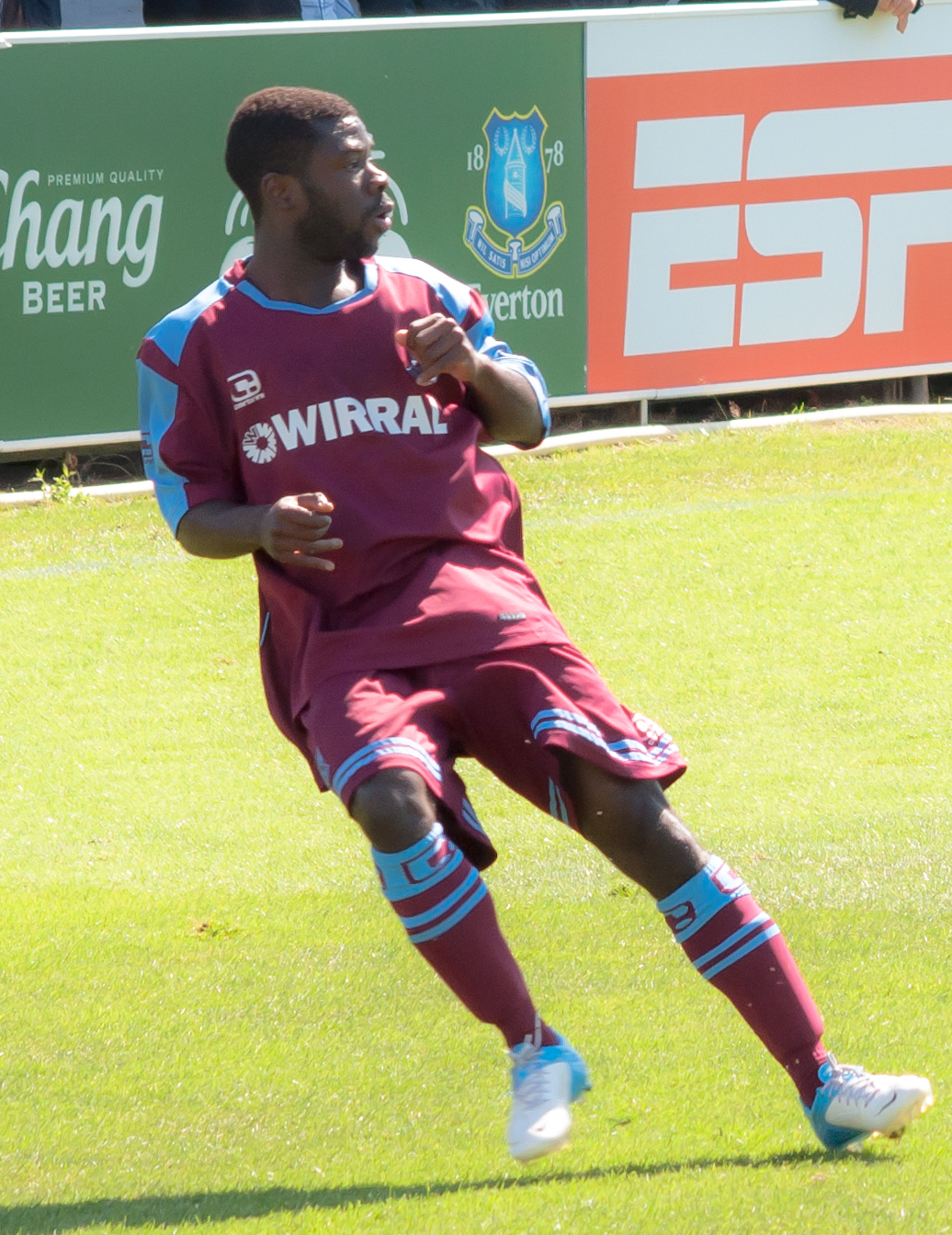
- Bell-Baggie playing for Tranmere Rovers in 2012

Personal information
- Full name: Abdulai Hindolo Bell-Baggie
- Date of birth: 28 April 1992 (age 34)
- Place of birth: Sierra Leone
- Height: 1.88 m (6 ft 2 in)
- Position: Winger

Youth career
- Reading
- Southampton
- 2007–2009: Reading

Senior career*
Years	Team	Apps	(Gls)
2009–2011	Reading	0	(0)
2010	→ Rotherham United (loan)	11	(0)
2010	→ Port Vale (loan)	3	(0)
2010–2011	→ Crawley Town (loan)	0	(0)
2011–2012	Yeovil Town	0	(0)
2012	Hayes & Yeading United	1	(0)
2012	Salisbury City	5	(1)
2012–2015	Tranmere Rovers	55	(4)
2015	Bristol Rovers	0	(0)
2015–2016	Stockport County	12	(1)
2016–2017	Poole Town	48	(3)
2017–2020	Weymouth	102	(18)
2020–2021	Eastleigh	20	(1)
2021–2022	Havant & Waterlooville	14	(2)
2022	Salisbury	18	(1)
2022–2023	Gosport Borough	34	(7)
2023	Bashley	6	(2)
Total		329	(40)

International career
2007	England U16	2	(0)
2008	England U17	2	(0)
2013–2014	Sierra Leone	5	(0)
- * Club domestic league appearances and goals

Abdulai Hindolo Bell-Baggie (born 28 April 1992) is a Sierra Leonean former professional footballer who played as a winger. He scored 45 goals in 372 league and cup appearances in a 14-year career in the English Football League and non-league football.

Born in Sierra Leone, Bell-Baggie represented both the England under-16 and England under-17 national teams before winning his first cap for Sierra Leone in 2013. A former Reading player, he has played on loan for Rotherham United, Port Vale, and Crawley Town and was briefly contracted to Yeovil Town and Hayes & Yeading United. He joined Salisbury City in January 2012 before switching to Tranmere Rovers seven months later. After spending three years at Tranmere, he was released before joining Bristol Rovers in March 2015 but failed to appear for the club. He joined Stockport County in June 2015 and moved on to Poole Town in March 2016. He joined Weymouth in October 2017 and helped the club to win the Southern League Premier Division title in 2018–19. He signed with Eastleigh in June 2020 and moved on to Havant & Waterlooville 12 months later. He signed with Salisbury in January 2022 and moved on to Gosport Borough five months later. He later played for Bashley.

== Club career ==
=== Early career ===
Bell-Baggie was born in Sierra Leone and moved to England with his family in 1999, remaining in England with a foster family when his parents returned to Sierra Leone in 2005. He attended Hillside and Bulmershe College in Berkshire as a youth, and became a part of the set-up at Reading at age nine. Though he spent some time at Southampton's youth team, he returned to Reading in 2007. He was awarded a club number in December 2009.

He joined League Two side Rotherham United on a one-month loan in March 2010, making his professional debut as a substitute on 16 March 2010 in a 2–1 defeat at Accrington Stanley, replacing Marcus Marshall a few minutes before full-time. His first start came in a 3–0 defeat at Aldershot on 5 April, after this game the loan spell was extended until the end of the season. However, his twelfth and final match for the club was the most significant game of his season, as he replaced Kevin Ellison late into the play-off final defeat to Dagenham and Redbridge at Wembley on 30 May 2010.

In August 2010, he was brought in by Port Vale's Micky Adams on a one-month loan to cover for Lewis Haldane, who was recovering from illness. This move came despite an offer of another loan spell from Rotherham United, and talk of Aldershot expecting the winger to join them on loan. After one substitute appearances he stated his aim to win a place in the starting eleven, however, he finished his loan spell with only one start – in the Football League Trophy, and four substitute appearances to his name. At the end of November, he joined Conference National high-flyers Crawley Town on loan, but only made one FA Cup appearance. At the end of the 2010–11 season Bell-Baggie was released by Reading.

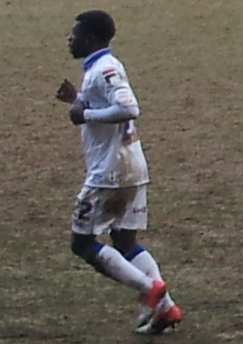
Bell-Baggie playing for Tranmere Rovers in 2013

In August 2011, Bell-Baggie signed a contract with Yeovil Town to keep him at the League One club until January 2012. In December 2011, Bell-Baggie was informed his short-term contract would not be extended, and he was released without making a single appearance. He signed with Conference club Hayes & Yeading United on 6 January, and played in the club's 3–1 defeat at Kidderminster Harriers the next day. On 16 January his ten-day spell at the club came to an end when he was signed by Salisbury City manager Darrell Clarke.

=== Tranmere Rovers ===
In July 2012, he joined Tranmere Rovers on trial. Manager Ronnie Moore, who was also manager during the winger's time at Rotherham, was impressed enough to offer Bell-Baggie a one-year contract, which was duly signed. Having featured regularly for the club since his arrival, he signed a new contract on 7 March 2013, keeping him at Tranmere until 2015. He scored two goals in 34 appearances across the 2012–13 campaign. Bell-Baggie played 15 games at the start of the 2013–14 season but did not make an appearance for Rovers after November as the club suffered relegation out of League One. He was named in the Football League team of the week for his performance in a 3–2 defeat at Accrington Stanley on 6 September 2014, having bagged a brace in the second half. He was placed on the transfer list in January 2015 by new manager Micky Adams, who had previously coached him at Port Vale, before having his contract cancelled by mutual consent a month later.

=== Non-League ===
In March 2015, Bell-Baggie joined Conference Premier club Bristol Rovers on a deal until the end of the 2014–15 season. Rovers won promotion out of the play-offs, though Bell-Baggie never made an appearance for the club. He was released at the end of the season. In June 2015, Bell-Baggie signed for National League North side Stockport County, and was described by manager Neil Young as "an exciting and excellent" player. He was released by new "Hatters" manager Jim Gannon in February after struggling with a series of niggling injuries.

He signed with Poole Town in March 2016. He played four league games towards the end of the 2015–16 season as the "Dolphins" won promotion into the National League South as champions of the Southern League Premier Division. He scored two goals in 35 league games in the 2016–17 campaign, however, Poole were barred from competing in the play-offs as Tatnam Ground did not meet National League standard regulations. He left the club on 10 October 2017, following the establishment of home grown talent Ollie Balmer in the first-team.

On 28 October 2017, Bell-Baggie joined Weymouth of the Southern League Premier Division. He made his debut for Mark Molesley's "Terras" later that day in a 4–1 FA Trophy defeat at Hereford on 28 October. He ended the 2017–18 season with five goals in 30 league appearances at the Bob Lucas Stadium, helping Weymouth to secure a place in the play-offs, where they were beaten 3–0 by King's Lynn Town at the semi-final stage. He featured 51 times in the 2018–19 season, scoring five goals, to help Weymouth to win promotion as champions of the Premier Division. He scored ten goals in 33 appearances in the 2019–20 National League South season, which was permanently suspended on 26 March due to the COVID-19 pandemic in England, with Weymouth in the play-offs in third-place.

On 23 June 2020, Bell-Baggie signed for Eastleigh of the National League; manager Ben Strevens said that "He's stood out on the occasions we've watched him. He carries the ball really well and has a really strong attacking threat. I'm really pleased to get it over the line so soon." He scored one goal in 20 league games across the 2020–21 campaign. At the end of the season, it was announced that Bell-Baggie's contract would not be being renewed and he would subsequently be released.

In June 2021, Bell-Baggie joined National League South side Havant & Waterlooville. He scored two goals in 16 games in the first half of the 2021–22 season. On 22 January 2022, Bell-Baggie joined Southern League Premier Division South side Salisbury. Steve Claridge's "Whites" ended the 2021–22 season in 15th-place, with Bell-Baggie scoring one goal in 18 appearances. On 21 June 2022, he signed with Gosport Borough of the Southern League Premier Division South. He scored eight goals in forty appearances throughout the 2022–23 campaign, including a brace on his debut in a 3–2 home win over Merthyr Town. He scored three goals in nine games for Bashley in the first half of the 2023–24 season.

== International career ==
Bell-Baggie turned out for England at both under-16 and under-17 levels. He lifted the Victory Shield in 2007 with the under-16s, Bell-Baggie starting in the 2–0 win over Wales and the 2–1 win against Scotland. In August 2008 he made two appearances for the under-17s, in a 2–1 defeat by Portugal and a 2–0 win over Italy. Bell-Baggie made his senior debut with Sierra Leone in a 1–0 defeat to Cape Verde at the Estádio da Várzea in a World Cup qualifier on 15 June 2013.

== Style of play ==
Rotherham United manager Ronnie Moore considered him to be an "impact player". He went on to say, "he's got electric pace. He's brave and strong and has got a lot of goals for the Reserves and kids. He's two footed and can play on the left wing and gets into little pocket. He turns and twists and, even at his young age, he knows the game."

== Personal life ==
In 2011, Bell-Baggie was living with his girlfriend, Natalie, sister of Adam Lallana.

== Career statistics ==
=== Club statistics ===
Appearances and goals by club, season and competition
Club	Season	League			FA Cup		League Cup		Other		Total	
Club	Season	Division	Apps	Goals	Apps	Goals	Apps	Goals	Apps	Goals	Apps	Goals
Reading	2009–10	Championship	0	0	—		—		—		0	0
Reading	2010–11	Championship	0	0	—		—		—		0	0
Reading	Total		0	0	0	0	0	0	0	0	0	0
Rotherham United (loan)	2009–10	League Two	11	0	—		—		1 (Note: Appearance in the League Two play-offs)	0	12	0
Port Vale (loan)	2010–11	League Two	3	0	—		1	0	1 (Note: Appearance in the Football League Trophy)	0	5	0
Crawley Town (loan)	2010–11	Conference National	0	0	1	0	—		—		1	0
Yeovil Town	2011–12	League One	0	0	—		—		—		0	0
Hayes & Yeading United	2011–12	Conference National	1	0	—		—		—		1	0
Salisbury City	2011–12	Conference South	5	1	—		—		—		5	1
Tranmere Rovers	2012–13	League One	31	1	—		2	1	1	0	34	2
Tranmere Rovers	2013–14	League One	12	0	1	0	2	0	—		15	0
Tranmere Rovers	2014–15	League Two	12	3	1	0	1	0	2	0	16	3
Tranmere Rovers	Total		55	4	2	0	5	1	3	0	65	5
Bristol Rovers	2014–15	Conference National	0	0	—		—		—		0	0
Stockport County	2015–16	National League North	12	1	0	0	—		0	0	12	1
Poole Town	2015–16	Southern League; Premier Division	4	0	0	0	—		0	0	4	0
Poole Town	2016–17	National League South	35	2	0	0	—		0	0	35	2
Poole Town	2017–18	National League South	9	1	0	0	—		0	0	9	1
Poole Town	Total		48	3	0	0	—		0	0	48	3
Weymouth	2017–18	Southern League; Premier Division	30	5	0	0	—		4 (Note: Appearance in the FA Trophy, Dorset Senior Cup, Southern League Challenge Cup and play-offs)	0	34	5
Weymouth	2018–19	Southern League; Premier Division	41	3	2	1	—		8 (Note: Appearance in the FA Trophy and Dorset Senior Cup)	1	51	5
Weymouth	2019–20	National League South	31	10	1	0	—		1 (Note: Appearance in the FA Trophy)	0	33	10
Weymouth	Total		102	18	3	1	—		13	1	118	20
Eastleigh	2020–21	National League	20	1	1	0	—		1	0	22	1
Havant & Waterlooville	2021–22	National League	14	2	1	0	—		1	0	16	2
Salisbury	2021–22	Southern League; Premier Division South	18	1	0	0	—		0	0	18	1
Gosport Borough	2022–23	Southern League; Premier Division South	34	7	2	0	—		4 (Note: Appearance in the FA Trophy, Hampshire Senior Cup and Portsmouth Senior Cup)	1	40	8
Bashley	2023–24	Southern League; Division One South	6	2	2	0	—		1	1	9	3
Career total			329	40	12	1	6	1	25	3	372	45

=== International statistics ===
Sierra Leone national team
Year	Apps	Goals
2013	2	0
2014	3	0
Total	5	0

== Honours ==
England under-16s

- Victory Shield: 2007

Weymouth

- Southern League Premier Division: 2018–19
