= Matt Cafer =

English footballer

Personal information
- Full name: Matthew Paul Cafer
- Date of birth: 27 September 1994 (age 32)
- Place of birth: Weymouth, England
- Height: 6 ft 2 in (1.89 m)
- Position: Goalkeeper

Team information
- Current team: Heatherton United
- Number: 1

Youth career
- 2006–2011: Weymouth
- 2011: Yeovil Town

Senior career*
| Years | Team | Apps | (Gls) |
| 2011–2013 | Yeovil Town | 0 | (0) |
| 2012 | → Sherborne Town (loan) | 1 | (0) |
| 2013 | → Willand Rovers (loan) | 3 | (0) |
| 2013 | → Weymouth (loan) | 0 | (0) |
| 2013–2014 | Weymouth | 0 | (0) |
| 2014–2017 | Europa | 16 | (0) |
| 2017 | Manchester 62 | 9 | (0) |
| 2017 | Bath City | 0 | (0) |
| 2017 | Gosport Borough | 7 | (0) |
| 2017 | Dorchester Town | 0 | (0) |
| 2017 | Farnborough | 5 | (0) |
| 2018 | Manchester 62 | 16 | (0) |
| 2018–2019 | Gibraltar Phoenix | 25 | (0) |
| 2019–2020 | Bruno's Magpies | 11 | (0) |
| 2020 | Romford | 17 | (0) |
| 2021–2022 | Coggeshall Town | 37 | (0) |
| 2022–2023 | Sittingbourne | 18 | (0) |
| 2023 | → Romford (loan) | 8 | (0) |
| 2024 | Phoenix Sports | 0 | (0) |
| 2024–2025 | VCD Athletic | 3 | (0) |
| 2026– | Heatherton United | 6 | (0) |

International career^{‡}
| 2018–2019 | Gibraltar | 2 | (0) |
- * Club domestic league appearances and goals as of 18:35, 29 May 2026 (UTC) ‡ National team caps and goals as of 21:49, 15 October 2019 (UTC)

Matthew Paul Cafer (born 27 September 1994) is a semi-professional footballer who plays as a goalkeeper for Victorian State League 3 side Heatherton United. Born in England, he has represented the Gibraltar national team.

== Club career ==
Born in Weymouth, Dorset, Cafer began his football career in the youth system of his home town club Weymouth captaining their youth sides from under-12 to under-16 level. Cafer had previously had trials Reading and Bristol City at the ages of 13 and 14, as well as playing for Dorset county from under-15 to under-17 level. In May 2011, Cafer signed a two-year youth scholarship with League One side Yeovil Town. On 12 November 2011, with the unavailability of loan goalkeeper Marek Štěch due to international commitments, Cafer featured on the Yeovil substitutes bench for the first time in the FA Cup first round against Hereford United. In November 2012, Cafer joined Western League First Division side Sherborne Town on a work-experience loan deal featuring once for the Dorset side in a 2–0 win over Welton Rovers. Having been part of the Yeovil squad that traveled to Wembley Stadium for the 2013 Football League One play-off final, Cafer was awarded his first professional contract at the end of the 2012–13 season signing a six-month deal. In August 2013, Cafer joined Western League Premier Division side Willand Rovers on a one-month loan deal, on his return to Yeovil he re-joined his home town club Southern Premier Division side Weymouth initially on loan. On 23 December 2013, Cafer was released by Yeovil to join Weymouth permanently on non-contract terms.

In January 2014, following a successful trial Cafer signed a professional contract with Gibraltar Premier Division side Europa. After two and a half years in Gibraltar playing for Europa and Manchester 62, Cafer returned to England to sign for National League South side Bath City. Due to a delay in his international clearance coming through following his move from Gibraltar Cafer failed to make a first-team appearance for Bath City, and subsequently joined Southern Premier Division side Gosport Borough. In October 2017, Cafer had a brief spell with Dorchester Town before signing for Farnborough. In 2018, Cafer returned to Gibraltar to re-sign for Manchester 62 before signing for newly promoted Gibraltar Phoenix at the end of the season. Following Phoenix's exit from Gibraltar football in August 2019, he joined Bruno's Magpies. He left in January 2020 and subsequently signed for Romford. Cafer joined Sittingbourne in June 2022 after a season with Coggeshall Town. Mid-way through the season, he rejoined Romford on loan, but left both clubs after a long term injury. After a year out of football in which he spent time playing with Sunday League side Sungate, he joined Phoenix Sports on 13 June 2024.

In February 2026 he moved to Australia and joined Heatherton United in the 7th tier. His season was cut short by an injury against Doncaster Rovers on 29 May.

== International career ==
Following a rule change in 2018, Cafer became eligible to play for the Gibraltar national football team. Cafer made his international debut for Gibraltar on 19 November 2018, starting in the 2018–19 UEFA Nations League D match against Macedonia, which finished as a 0–4 away loss.

== Career statistics ==
=== International ===
As of 10 October 2019

Gibraltar
| Year | Apps | Goals |
|---|---|---|
| 2018 | 1 | 0 |
| 2019 | 1 | 0 |
| Total | 2 | 0 |
