= 2013–14 Yeovil Town F.C. season =

Yeovil Town
2013–14 season
- Chairman: John Fry
- Manager: Gary Johnson
- Stadium: Huish Park
- Championship: 24th (relegated)
- FA Cup: Fourth round
- League Cup: Second round
- Top goalscorer: League: Ishmael Miller (10); All: Ishmael Miller (10)
- Highest home attendance: 9,108 (21 September vs. Queens Park Rangers, Championship)
- Lowest home attendance: 3,667 (4 January vs. Leyton Orient, FA Cup)
- Average home league attendance: 6,589
Home colours	Away colours

The 2013–14 season was the 11th season in the Football League and the first season at the second tier of English football played by Yeovil Town Football Club, an English football club based in Yeovil, Somerset. Their promotion via the play-offs in the 2012–13 season meant they played in the Championship, for the first time in the club's history.

Manager Gary Johnson signed seven players before the close of the summer transfer window. The season started with victory away at Millwall but the club then slipped into the relegation zone and only briefly escaping the relegation zone in September. Yeovil remained in the relegation zone from October until the end of the season. The signing of Ishmael Miller on loan briefly improved their survival chances helping the club to record a four-match unbeaten run in November and December followed by a five-match run in February and March but in the end Yeovil were relegated with a game to spare.

Yeovil reached the second round of the League Cup for the second season in succession, beating Southend United before being defeated by Birmingham City on penalties. The club reached the fourth round of the FA Cup for only the third time in the club's history, losing to Premier League side Southampton having beaten Leyton Orient in the third round. Nottingham Forest loanee Ishmael Miller was the club's top scorer with 10 goals, with all those coming in the league.

== Background ==
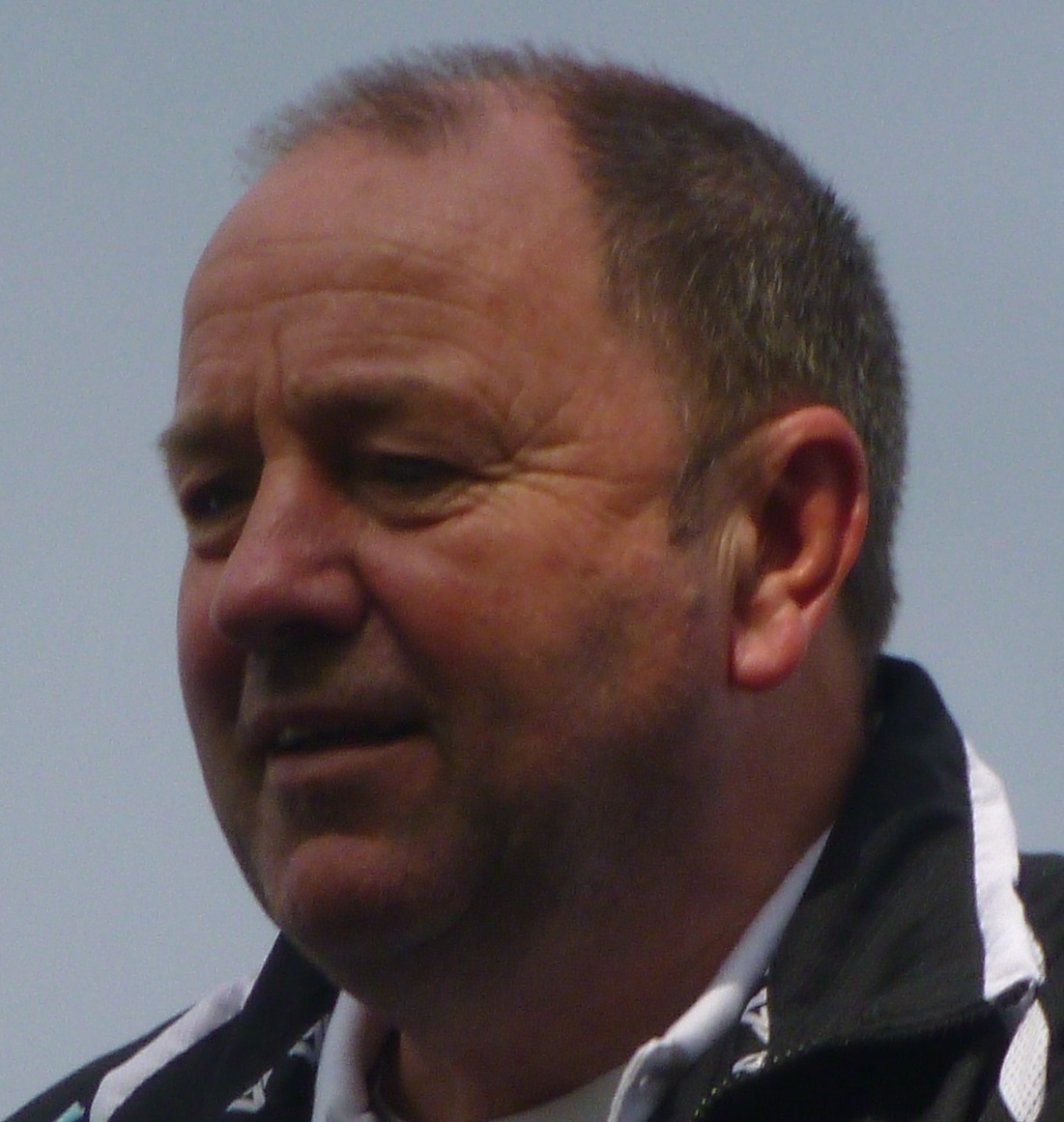
Manager Gary Johnson signed a new contract.

The 2012–13 season was the club's tenth anniversary of reaching the Football League, and their eighth consecutive season in the third tier, it was manager Gary Johnson's first full season in charge since returning to the football club in January 2012. Yeovil started the season well briefly topping the Football League One table in August, before a 6-match losing run in September and October saw them drop in to mid-table. Having stood 12th in the league table after a Boxing Day defeat against Bournemouth, Yeovil went on an 8-match run winning run which transformed them into promotion candidates. The club also reached the Southern Area semi-finals of the Football League Trophy before being beaten by Leyton Orient. The signing of Paddy Madden permanently in January saw Yeovil win 11 of their final 20 games, and the team finished the season 4th in the table, a new record high finishing position, and qualified for the play-offs. Where they faced Sheffield United in the semi-final, a 1–0 away defeat in the first leg, before a late Ed Upson goal gave Yeovil a 2–0 victory in the home leg. Brentford faced Yeovil in the 2013 Football League One play-off final at Wembley Stadium, Yeovil won 2–1 courtesy of goals from Madden and Dan Burn and were promoted to the second-tier of English football for the first time in the club's history.

The end of the season featured a smaller than usual turnover of players, defender Richard Hinds and midfielders Dominic Blizzard and Gavin Williams were released by the club. Manager Gary Johnson and his backroom staff of Terry Skiverton and Darren Way signed new two-year deals to confirm they would lead Yeovil in the Championship. Goalkeeper Matt Cafer was promoted to the first-team squad after signing a six-month professional contract with the club. Ahead of the new season midfielders Kevin Dawson and Sam Foley signed new two-year contracts, while defender Nathan Ralph and midfielder Lewis Young were invited back for pre-season training by Gary Johnson.

== Review ==
=== Pre-season ===
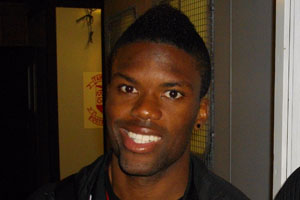
Winger Joel Grant signed from Wycombe Wanderers.

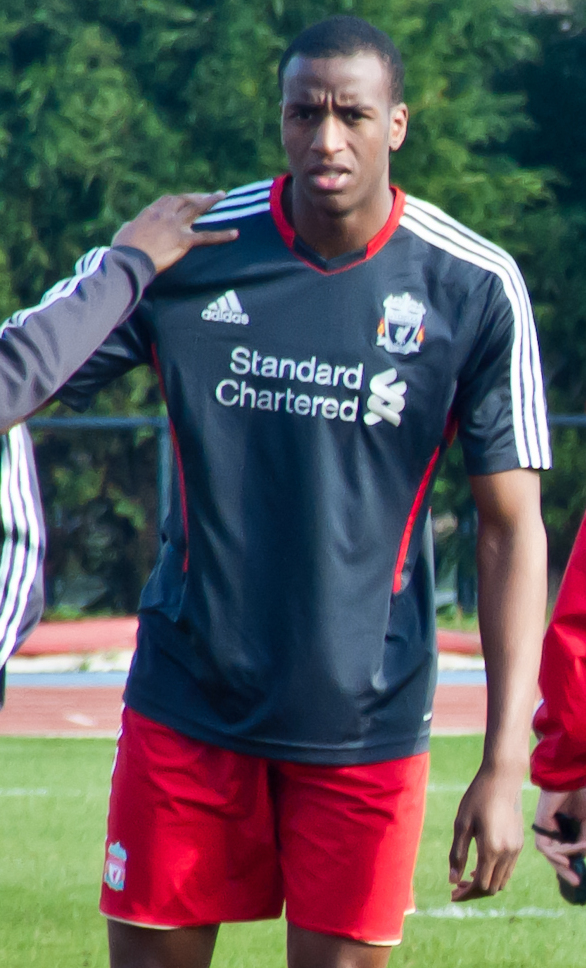
Striker Michael Ngoo signed on loan from Liverpool.

The squad returned for pre-season training on 26 June. The first day of pre-season saw the squad joined by three new signings, former Jamaican under-20 international Joel Grant signed from Wycombe Wanderers and released Southampton striker Sam Hoskins signing two-year contracts and former Leicester City defender Joey Jones signing a six-month deal. Striker Reuben Reid rejoined Football League Two side Plymouth Argyle on a season long loan deal. The players were also joined by six confirmed trialists, former Southampton loanee Ryan Dickson, released Northampton Town defender Seth Nana Twumasi, Italian centre-back Davide Grassi, Irish midfielder Gary Deegan, former Sheffield United trainee Jordan Robertson and Dorchester Town striker Kieffer Moore. Of these trialists only Twumasi and Moore remained with Yeovil for their second week of pre-season training, the trialists were joined by Welsh international defender Lewin Nyatanga and former Swindon Town midfielder Simon Ferry. On 2 July, Yeovil Town announced that chief executive Martyn Starnes was leaving the club to take on the same position at Plymouth Argyle, Starnes having been in his role with Yeovil for five-and-a-half years.

On 6 July, prior to Yeovil's first pre-season friendly against Poole Town, the club confirmed they had agreed terms with Dorchester Town for the transfer of Kieffer Moore for an "undisclosed fee". Four more trialists joined the side for the friendly, former Brighton & Hove Albion full back Marcos Painter, former Reading centre-back Angus MacDonald, former Crystal Palace defender Aaron Akuruka and midfielder Junior Konadu-Yiadom. Yeovil won the friendly 3–1 with goals from Kieffer Moore, James Hayter and Joe Edwards. The following week saw a further rotation of trialists with Ferry, Nyatanga and Painter departing and Zimbabwean international left-sided player Onismor Bhasera joining the club on trial. 10 July saw the club confirm three signings firstly the former England U20 striker Michael Ngoo on loan from Liverpool until the end of the 2013–14 season, secondly the confirmation of the signing of Dorchester Town striker Kieffer Moore on a two-year contract, and midfielder Billy Clifford on a six-month loan from Chelsea. That evening the Glovers played local rivals Weymouth a "behind closed doors" friendly match, Yeovil won the match 7–0 with a newly signed loanee Michael Ngoo scoring a first half hat-trick, before Kieffer Moore scored a second half hat-trick from Kieffer Moore with trialist Junior Konadu-Yiadom rounding off the scoring.

On 12 July, the club embarked short pre-season bonding trip to southern Portugal, with the club confirming only one trialist was present on the trip former Northampton defender Seth Nana Twumasi. The following day the club played an unofficial friendly match against Portuguese Segunda Liga side SC Farense, taking place at the Browns Leisure Complex in Quarteira where the Glovers had been training. Yeovil lost the friendly 2–0 and had to play part of the second half with 10-men following the sending off of Chelsea loanee Billy Clifford for a second bookable offence. Yeovil returned home to play Torquay United in a friendly, on 16 July, where their squad included former Southampton defender Danny Seaborne. Despite dominating the game in terms of possession and chances two late Torquay goals condemned the Glovers to a second consecutive 2–0 defeat. A third consecutive defeat without scoring followed with a 5–0 defeat against Premier League side Swansea City in the club's first home friendly. After the game the club confirmed the signing of former Southampton defender Seaborne on a two-year contract. On 23 July, Yeovil confirmed the signing of Swansea City defender Alan Tate on loan until 2 January 2014, the club made the announcement of the signing by producing a mocked-up picture of an easel outside Huish Park following the arrival of the Duke and Duchess of Cambridge's son the day before. Tate made his debut that evening in a 2–1 friendly victory over Exeter City courtesy of goals from Ed Upson and Paddy Madden. The players who didn't feature prominently in the club's final home friendly played a Bristol City U21 side, on 25 July. The Yeovil XI won the match 3–1 thanks to a brace from Sam Hoskins and a goal from Liverpool loanee Michael Ngoo. Yeovil then travelled to Home Park to play Plymouth Argyle on 27 July, Yeovil's side featured a new trialist in the shape of former Port Vale midfielder Ryan Burge. The Glovers won the match 2–1 with first half goals from Madden and Hayter. Yeovil's final game of pre-season was a trip to The New Lawn to play Forest Green Rovers. A weakened Yeovil side featuring three new trialists, Swansea City full back Curtis Obeng, former Oxford United left sided players Liam Davis and midfielder Ben Long, won the match 5–3 with two goals from Michael Ngoo, a goal each from Sam Hoskins and trialist Ben Long and an own goal. Yeovil's pre-season preparation featured nine matches in all with six victories and three defeats Yeovil scoring 22 goals and conceding 16. The following day the club announced the signing of Liam Davis on a two-year contract, and at the club's photocall confirmed that Nathan Ralph and Lewis Young both agreed new short-term deals with the club as well as former Northampton Town defender Seth Nana Twumasi.

Pre-season match details
Date	Opponents	Venue	Result	Score F–A	Scorers	Attendance	Ref
6 July 2013	Poole Town	A	W	3–1	Moore, Hayter, Edwards	487	
10 July 2013	Weymouth	H	W	7–0	Moore (3), Konadu-Yiadom, Ngoo (3)	—	
13 July 2013	SC Farense	N	L	0–2		—	
16 July 2013	Torquay United	A	L	0–2		1,168	
19 July 2013	Swansea City	H	L	0–5		2,236	
23 July 2013	Exeter City	H	W	2–1	Upson, Madden	1,180	
27 July 2013	Plymouth Argyle	A	W	2–1	Hayter, Madden	2,492	
29 July 2013	Forest Green Rovers	A	W	5–3	Hoskins, Trialist (og), Ngoo (2), Long	647	

=== August ===
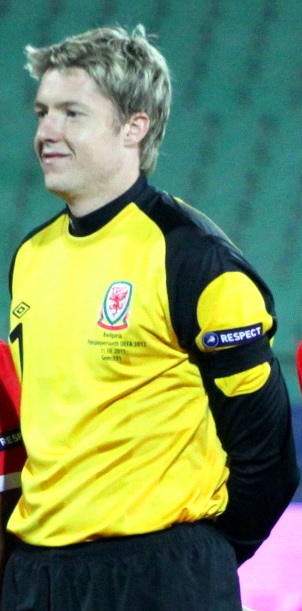
Welsh international Wayne Hennessey joined on loan from Wolves.

Yeovil's Championship season started with a trip to The Den to face Millwall, on 3 August. Yeovil won the match 1–0 thanks to a late goal from midfielder Ed Upson. On 6 August, Yeovil travelled to Southend to face Southend United in a Football League Cup first round tie, a first half goal from Kevin Dawson was enough for Yeovil to record a 1–0 victory and progress to the second round. The draw for the second round of the League Cup took place, on 8 August, and presented Yeovil with a home tie against Championship rivals Birmingham City. Yeovil then faced Birmingham City in their first home match in the Championship, the game started badly with goalkeeper Marek Štěch breaking his hand in two places after just eight minutes, Yeovil lost the match 1–0 through an unfortunate own-goal from centre back Danny Seaborne. After the match it was confirmed that striker Paddy Madden had been up to the Republic of Ireland national team squad for the first time for their friendly against Wales. On 12 August, it was announced that Welsh international goalkeeper Wayne Hennessey had been lined up to join the club on loan from Wolverhampton Wanderers for an initial month, following the injury to Štěch, but this loan was scrapped after Hennessey suffered an injury setback while on international duty. On 14 August, striker Paddy Madden made his international debut as a 69th-minute substitute in the Republic of Ireland's 0–0 draw against Wales. On 16 August, Yeovil signed Cardiff City midfielder Joe Ralls on loan until January 2014. Prior to Yeovil's match with Burnley, the club confirmed the signings of Manchester United goalkeeper Sam Johnstone on a three-month loan deal, replacing the injured Wayne Hennessey, and former Northampton Town goalkeeper Chris Dunn on a one-year contract as further goalkeeper cover. Yeovil lost the first competitive meeting of the two sides 2–0 after second half goals from Keith Treacy and Sam Vokes. On 19 August, Yeovil's fringe players faced their Exeter City counterparts in a friendly which Yeovil won 3–2 thanks to a brace from Kieffer Moore and a goal from Michael Ngoo. The following day the club confirmed that new goalkeeper Sam Johnstone had suffered a finger injury prior to the match against Burnley and would be returning to Manchester United. The following day the club confirmed that Wolves keeper Wayne Hennessey would be rejoining the club on loan for an initial month. On 22 August, Yeovil confirmed that versatile midfielder/full-back Joe Edwards had signed a one-year contract extension to keep him at the club until the summer of 2015. The next day the club confirmed that former striker Andy Williams had re-signed for the club on a season long loan from Swindon Town. On 24 August, Yeovil lost their third consecutive match a 3–0 home defeat at the hands of Derby County. Following the match it was confirmed that Chelsea midfielder Billy Clifford had returned to his parent club prematurely, having featured only once during his loan spell.

Yeovil faced Birmingham City in their League Cup second round tie, on 27 August. With Birmingham leading 2–1 going into injury time at the end of normal time, Byron Webster made it 2–2 to send the tie into extra-time when he controversially chipped into an empty net after Birmingham goalkeeper Colin Doyle had kicked the ball out following an injury to Dan Burn. Yeovil initially refused to allow Birmingham to walk-in an equaliser, with the game in extra time defender Luke Ayling scored his first goal for Yeovil after 145 appearances to make it 3–2 to Yeovil in extra time with a left-footed drive. Then at the start of the second period of extra-time Lee Novak was allowed to score an unopposed equaliser after manager Gary Johnson decided Webster's goal had been "ungentlemanly". Yeovil eventually lost the game 3–2 on penalties. Prior to Yeovil's match with Reading it was confirmed that Irish striker Paddy Madden had suffered a knee injury and would be out for four weeks, and midfielder Lewis Young would be released from his short-term contract. Yeovil's first League meeting with Reading resulted in a fourth consecutive league defeat after a controversial penalty from Reading striker Adam Le Fondre handed Yeovil a 1–0 defeat to leave the Glovers in the relegation zone of the Championship.

=== September ===
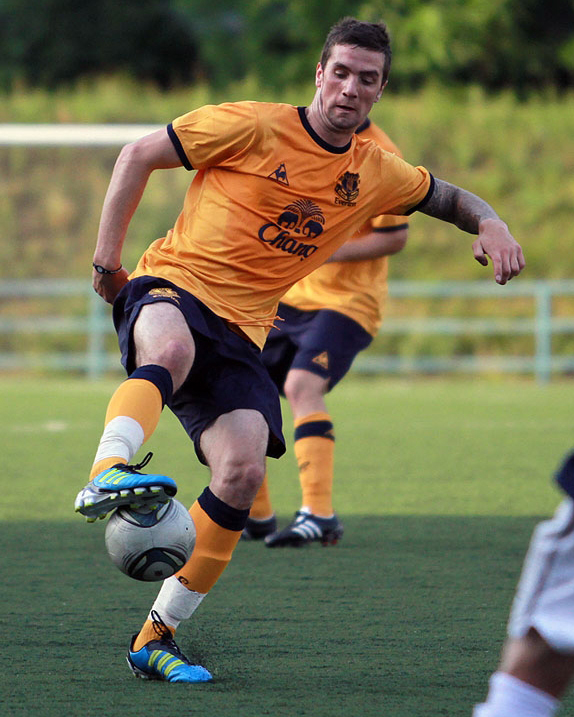
Defender Shane Duffy joined on loan from Everton.

Transfer deadline day saw Yeovil complete the signing of Bristol City defender Liam Fontaine for a third spell on loan until 1 January. On 5 September, the club confirmed that Swansea City defender Alan Tate had suffered "grade two hamstring injury" and would return to Swansea for treatment. During the international break, on 10 September, a Yeovil XI played a Bournemouth XI in a behind closed doors friendly the Glovers fringe players winning the match 5–0 with goals from Joey Jones, Kieffer Moore, Sam Hoskins and Michael Ngoo. Young keeper Matt Cafer joined Southern Premier League side Weymouth, on 14 September, on a short-term loan deal. On 14 September, Yeovil faced Sheffield Wednesday at Hillsborough, Yeovil picked up their first draw of the season despite captain Byron Webster being sent off Joe Ralls salvaged a point for the ten men. Yeovil's following match saw Joel Grant give them a first half lead at Ipswich Town, but a second half comeback from Ipswich saw Yeovil lose the match 2–1. On 20 September, the club confirmed that Welsh international keeper Wayne Hennessey's loan had been extended until 26 October. Yeovil's next match saw them face Queens Park Rangers, in front of bumper home crowd of 9,108. Despite matching QPR for the majority of the match Yeovil lost the game 1–0 due to a late Charlie Austin penalty. The next week saw a Yeovil XI face a Torquay United XI, which saw a return to action for striker Paddy Madden, Yeovil winning the friendly 7–1. On 26 September, Yeovil brought in Everton defender Shane Duffy on an initial month-long loan as cover for the injured Liam Fontaine and suspended Byron Webster. On 28 September, Yeovil faced a trip to the Reebok Stadium to face Bolton Wanderers, despite an Ed Upson goal giving Yeovil the lead going into injury time Bolton grabbed a controversial late equaliser.

=== October ===
The new month saw Yeovil face Leicester City at home and lost the match 2–1 but grabbed their first home league goal of the season through a James Hayter penalty. On 5 October, Yeovil travelled to the Riverside Stadium to face Middlesbrough, despite taking an early lead through Liam Davis Yeovil lost the match 4–1. A strong Yeovil reserves side faced Radstock Town in the Somerset Premier Cup, Yeovil won the game 8–0 with a first half hat trick from Paddy Madden. On 9 October, the club confirmed that Liverpool loanee Michael Ngoo his loan had been cancelled by mutual consent after dropping down the pecking order with Yeovil and returned to his parent club. On 15 October, Yeovil played local side Wincanton Town to formally switch on the club's new floodlights. The Glovers won the friendly 8–0. Scottish under-21 midfielder Fraser Fyvie arrived on loan from Wigan Athletic on loan until 1 January. Yeovil returned to Championship action, on 19 October, with a home match against Brighton & Hove Albion and picked up their first home point of the season with a 0–0 draw. New loan player Fyvie's debut only lasted 22 minutes after suffering a "grade two shoulder injury" keeping him out of action for around a month. In midweek Yeovil faced Conference South side Dorchester Town, Yeovil beating the Dorset club 6–0 in a friendly. On 25 October, the club announced that Wolves keeper Hennessey had extended his loan for a final month until 17 November. The following day Yeovil faced high flying Nottingham Forest at Huish Park. An eighth-minute opener from Ed Upson set Yeovil on their way before Forest's Simon Cox had a penalty saved by Wayne Hennessey. Upson completed his brace with a goal from 25 yards, and although Forest immediately replied through Nathaniel Chalobah, Yeovil extended their lead just before half time when Byron Webster headed in from an Upson corner. Yeovil held on to win their first home league game of the season. On 31 October, the club announced the extension of Everton defender Shane Duffy's loan by a further month.

=== November ===
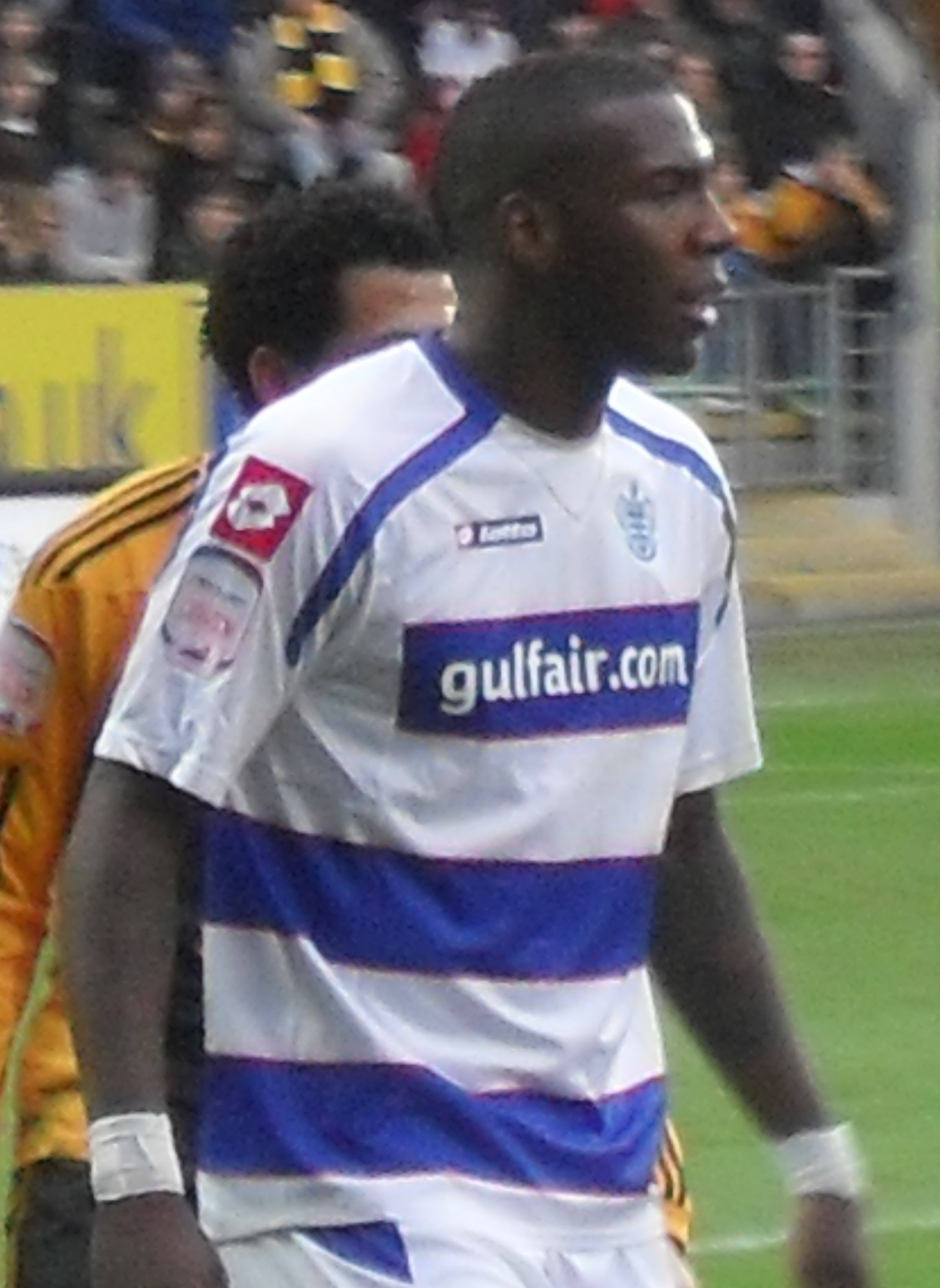
Nottingham Forest striker Ishmael Miller joined on loan and finished the season as Yeovil's top scorer.

Yeovil travelled to Elland Road to face Leeds United on 2 November. A second half brace from Scottish forward Ross McCormack saw Yeovil lose the game 2–0 to slip to the foot of the Championship table. Following the game the club confirmed that striker Andy Williams had suffered a serious knee injury in training ruling him out for the rest of the season. Williams returned to parent club Swindon Town for treatment but officially remained on loan at Yeovil for the remainder of the season, with Yeovil still having to pay a portion of his wages. On 5 November, Yeovil faced Conference South side Weston-super-Mare in the second round of the Somerset Premier Cup, Yeovil won the match 4–1 but saw defender Luke Ayling sent off after being involved in a twenty-man brawl. Ayling being suspended for three non-first team matches for his violent conduct. On 10 November, Yeovil played Wigan Athletic and for the fourth time this season suffered a 1–0 home defeat. The game marked the final match of Wayne Hennessey's loan spell, and with the club confirming that first choice keeper Marek Štěch would be out for a further month with his hand injury Stuart Taylor arrived on a month loan from Reading. During the international break Yeovil faced the Latvian national team in a friendly at Huish Park on 18 November, Taylor made his non-competitive debut in this game. A 75th-minute goal from Valērijs Šabala was enough to earn Latvia a 1–0 victory. On 20 November, the club confirmed that just two days after joining the club goalkeeper Stuart Taylor was returning to Reading for "personal reasons". Yeovil traveled to Doncaster Rovers, on 22 November, with Chris Dunn making his debut in goal. Yeovil conceded early on but courtesy of a goal from former Doncaster player Byron Webster the game was level with ten minutes to go when Doncaster were reduced to ten men with sending off of midfielder Dean Furman. Despite this Yeovil lost the match 2–1 after conceding a late goal. On 26 November, last season's top goalscorer Paddy Madden was placed on the transfer list by the club. The loan transfer deadline day on 28 November, saw Yeovil sign three players on month long loan deals, Everton midfielder John Lundstram, Nottingham Forest forward Ishmael Miller and Liverpool forward Adam Morgan whose loan is set to be made permanent in the new year, while defender Danny Seaborne joined League One side Coventry City on loan until January. On 30 November, Yeovil traveled to Watford with all three loan signings making their debuts. Yeovil won the match 3–0 courtesy of goals from Byron Webster, Joe Edwards and Ishmael Miller with a goal on his debut. Following the game the club confirmed that Everton defender Shane Duffy had extended his loan for a third and final month until 27 December.

=== December ===
On 3 December, Yeovil faced Blackpool and courtesy of a first half goal from John Lundstram to secure their second consecutive win, the match ended with Blackpool having three players sent off after the 90th minute. Yeovil continued their unbeaten run against Charlton Athletic, on 7 December, after coming from 2–0 behind at half time to draw the match 2–2 thanks to an own goal from Michael Morrison and an Ishmael Miller penalty. The next day saw Yeovil draw League One side Leyton Orient at home in the FA Cup third round. On 14 December, Yeovil faced Barnsley and extended their unbeaten run to four matches with a 1–1 draw after an early Joel Grant goal. After making only two appearances in the first two months of his loan midfielder Fraser Fyvie's return to parent club Wigan Athletic was confirmed on 16 December. On 19 December, the club confirmed that the short-term contracts of defenders Joey Jones and Seth Nana Twumasi had been extended until the end of the season. Two days later Yeovil faced Blackburn Rovers and fell to a 1–0 defeat courtesy of a Jordan Rhodes goal. Former youth-team goalkeeper Matt Cafer was released on 23 December, to join Southern Premier League side Weymouth. Boxing Day saw Yeovil travel to Bournemouth for the second consecutive season and fell to a repeat of their 2012 defeat losing 3–0 conceding three second half goals. After the Bournemouth match Yeovil confirmed that Everton defender Shane Duffy would be returning to the club on loan until the end of the season from 1 January. On 28 December, despite Ishmael Miller giving Yeovil an early lead with his third goal of his loan spell Yeovil fell to a 5–1 defeat at Huddersfield Town.

=== January ===
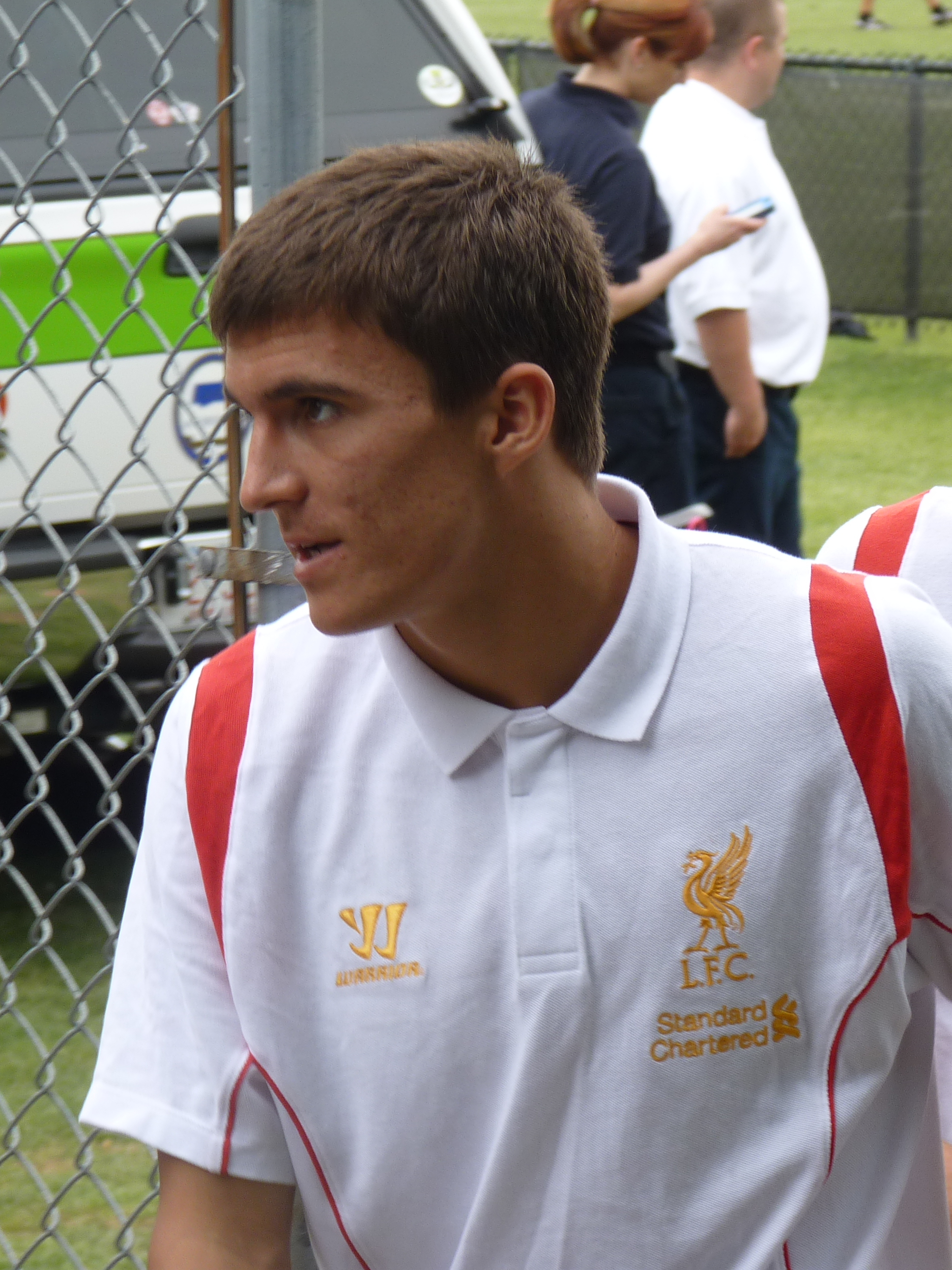
Striker Adam Morgan signed permanently from Liverpool.

Heavy rain over Christmas and New Year saw Yeovil's New Years Day home game against Watford postponed because of a waterlogged pitch. The opening of the transfer window saw Yeovil confirm the permanent signing of Liverpool striker Adam Morgan on a two-and-a-half-year contract, and the extension of Everton midfielder John Lundstram's loan until the end of the season. On 2 January, Yeovil completed their second signing of the transfer window Italian former Oldham Athletic defender Matteo Lanzoni joining on an eighteen-month contract. On 4 January, Yeovil faced Football League One side Leyton Orient in the FA Cup third round. Yeovil ended a three-game losing run with a convincing 4–0 victory thanks to a brace from James Hayter and a goal each from Joel Grant and Kieffer Moore. The following day saw Yeovil, through to the FA Cup fourth round for just the third time in their history, drawn away against Premier League side Southampton. After being on the transfer list for six weeks, on 10 January last season's top goalscorer Paddy Madden joined Football League Two side Scunthorpe United for an undisclosed fee, believed to be £300,000. On 11 January, Yeovil announced they had agreed to extend the loan of Cardiff City midfielder Joe Ralls until the end of the season. The same day Yeovil faced Burnley at Huish Park, goals from Danny Ings and Sam Vokes consigned Yeovil to a 2–1 defeat despite Kieffer Moore's first Championship goal. Defender Danny Seaborne joined Coventry City on a free transfer on 14 January having initially joined the League One side on loan in November. On 17 January, Yeovil confirmed the signing of Leicester City left-back Zoumana Bakayogo on a month-long loan deal to cover an injury to Liam Davis. Bakayogo made his debut the following day away at Birmingham City, and thanks to a first-half brace from James Hayter Yeovil won the match 2–0. Bakayogo's loan spell lasted just 37 minutes after he ruptured his anterior cruciate ligament and returned to Leicester City. On 23 January, Nottingham Forest striker Ishmael Miller rejoined on loan until the end of the season. Yeovil's FA Cup fourth round tie, on 25 January, against Southampton saw the club take over 3,000 away fans but the Premier League side won the match 2–0. On 28 January, Yeovil traveled to Derby County despite leading 2–0 at half time thanks to goals from John Lundstram and Ishmael Miller a second half collapse saw Yeovil lose the match 3–2 to fall to the bottom of the Championship table.

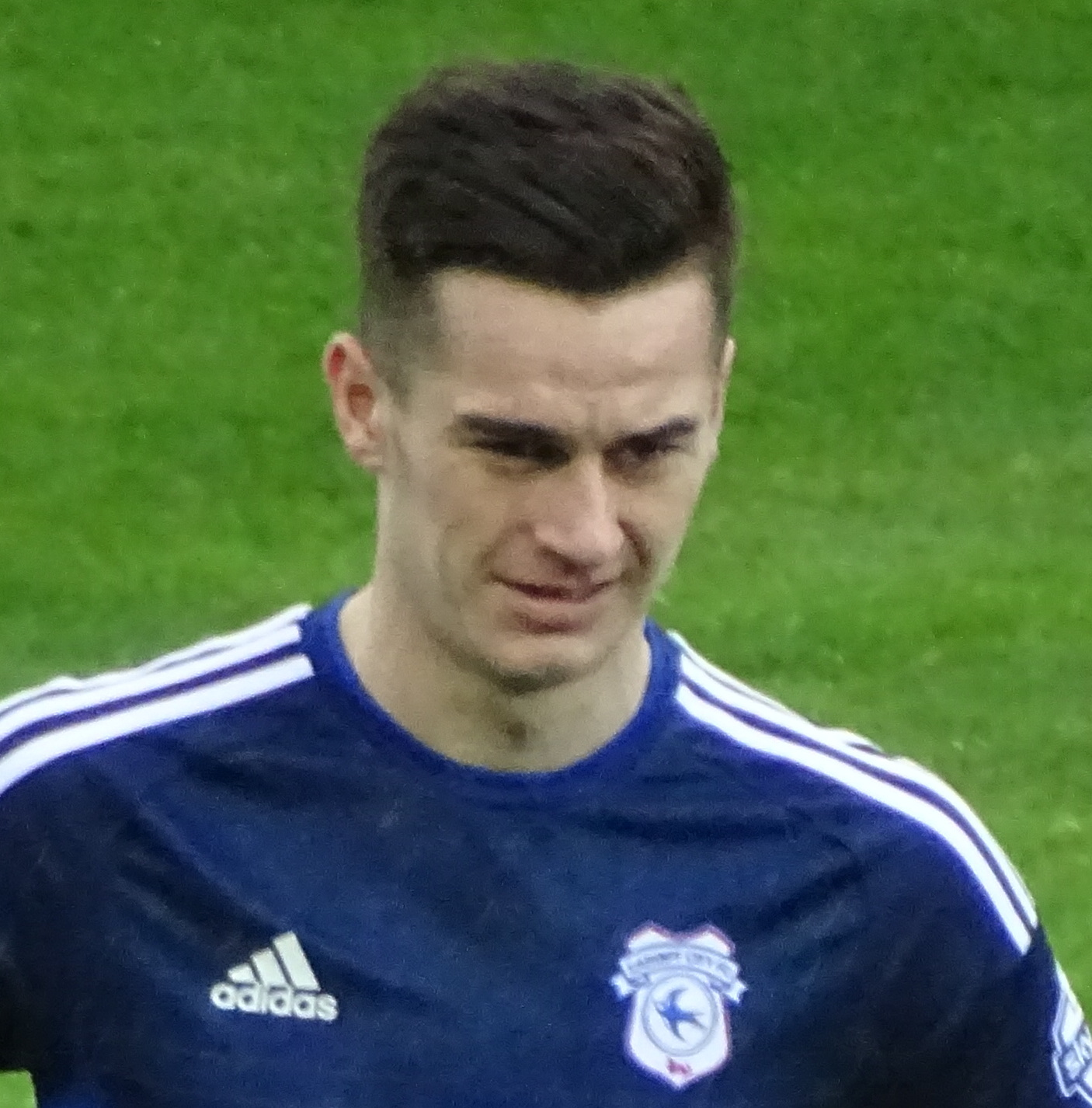
Welsh forward Tom Lawrence joined on loan from Manchester United.

A surprisingly busy transfer deadline day for Yeovil, saw young defender Joey Jones join Conference National side Woking on loan until 3 March. Midfielder and top scorer Ed Upson joined fellow Championship strugglers Millwall for an undisclosed fee reported to be in the region of £100,000. Yeovil's only incoming transfer saw Manchester United forward Tom Lawrence join on loan until the end of the season.

=== February ===
A second trip to the East Midlands in a week saw Yeovil take on Nottingham Forest, on 2 February. Forest took the lead courtesy of a Byron Webster own goal before Kieffer Moore equalised for Yeovil, but goals from Simon Cox and Rafik Djebbour saw Yeovil fall to a 3–1 defeat. February then saw a run of four consecutive home matches for Yeovil, the first of these games was against Leeds United live on Sky Sports, on 8 February. Forest loanee Ishmael Miller headed Yeovil into the lead but he failed to extend Yeovil's advantage when he missed a penalty just before half time. The miss was punished almost immediately after the break with Ross McCormack scoring from long range before Stephen Warnock scored a wind-assisted long range free kick. The second home game saw Yeovil take on fellow strugglers Millwall, on 11 March, Joe Ralls second goal of the season volleyed in to give Yeovil a second half lead but a Steve Morison equaliser meant more points dropped from a winning position. On 18 February, Yeovil confirmed the signing of Spanish former FC Honka midfielder Rubén Palazuelos until the end of the season. The same day the club announced a loss of £454,000 for the year ending June 2013, and that evening Yeovil and Watford played out a 0–0 draw. On 20 February, Yeovil announced the signing of Huddersfield Town winger Duane Holmes on loan until 23 March. Holmes made his debut against Doncaster Rovers, on 22 February, and was fouled for a penalty which James Hayter converted to give Yeovil their first home league win since November.

=== March ===
On 1 March Yeovil travelled to Reading. A headed goal from on-loan defender Shane Duffy saw Yeovil take a first-half lead, before having Byron Webster sent off and conceding a penalty in the 66th minute. Despite Marek Štěch saving Adam Le Fondre's penalty, Reading equalised through a John Lundstram own goal from the resulting corner. Just two minutes later Yeovil were reduced to nine men with Joe Ralls receiving a straight red card. Remarkably, in the 88th minute Yeovil were reduced to eight men with Kieffer Moore being sent off for a second bookable offence; despite this Yeovil managed to hold out for a 1–1 draw. Following the match Yeovil successfully appealed the first of the three red cards shown to centre back Webster. On 7 March, midfielder Sam Foley joined League One side Shrewsbury Town on an initial month loan while defender Joey Jones had his loan at Woking extended for a further month. The following day a brace from on loan Ishmael Miller saw Yeovil beat Sheffield Wednesday 2–0 and extend their unbeaten run to five matches. On 10 March, after struggling for game time John Lundstram was recalled by Everton after his four-month stay. That week saw two consecutive defeats for Yeovil, first a 1–0 reverse at home against Ipswich Town, before a 3–0 defeat away at Queens Park Rangers on 15 March. Following the QPR match it was confirmed Huddersfield midfielder Duane Holmes's loan would be cut short with Yeovil sending the American back a week early. On 18 March, Yeovil traveled to Wigan Athletic who were on the back of an eight match winning run. After Štěch had saved a first half Jordi Gómez penalty Wigan took the lead through Nick Powell early in the second half. There then followed five goals in the final eight minutes, as Ishmael Miller struck twice to put Yeovil in front but they were immediately pegged back James McArthur equalised and a Byron Webster own goal put Wigan ahead but Luke Ayling bundled in a last-minute equaliser to level the game at 3–3. The following Saturday Yeovil faced Bolton Wanderers and despite Miller, with his 10th goal of the season, and Kevin Dawson giving Yeovil a half time lead. They were pegged back to 2–1 immediately after the break and a Miller missed penalty in the 80th minute proved costly as 10 man Bolton salvaged a point. After the match the club confirmed the signing of former Dorchester Town defender Calvin Brooks on non-contract terms until the end of the season, who was then immediately loaned out on a dual-registration deal to Western League Division One side Wincanton Town until the end of the season. On 25 March, Yeovil traveled to leaders Leicester City and led through a Joe Ralls free-kick until the final minute with a Chris Wood goal depriving Yeovil of three points. The following Saturday saw Yeovil face relegation rivals Barnsley but suffered a damaging 4–1 defeat leaving Yeovil bottom of the table.

=== April and May ===
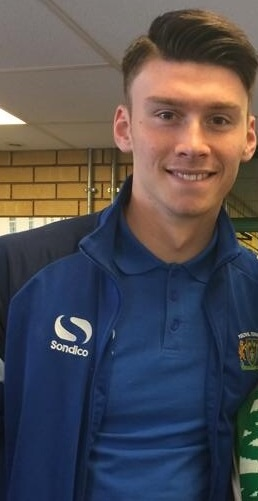
Kieffer Moore scored twice in two matches to take his tally for the season to five.

Before their match with Blackpool on 5 April, manager Gary Johnson confirmed that Nottingham Forest striker and Yeovil top scorer Ishmael Miller had left the club after walking out of a team meeting. Despite this Yeovil managed to record their first win in six matches with a 2–1 victory over fellow strugglers Blackpool thanks to goals from James Hayter and Tom Lawrence. Yeovil then traveled to Charlton Athletic, Astrit Ajdarevic fired in an early opener from outside the penalty area but Joel Grant quickly equalised but two goals in the first five minutes of the second half saw Charlton take a 3–1 lead and despite Kieffer Moore reducing the deficit Charlton held out. The defeat left Yeovil six points from safety with just five matches remaining. A second consecutive goal from Kieffer Moore helped end Bournemouth's five match winning run but a fortuitous Ryan Fraser goal held Yeovil to a 1–1 draw. On 16 April, the club announced that midfielder Sam Foley had been recalled from his loan at Shrewsbury Town. A goalless draw away at play-off chasing Blackburn Rovers on 18 April, followed by a 2–1 defeat at home to Huddersfield Town left Yeovil on the verge of relegation six points adrift and a far inferior goal difference with just two matches remaining, and the club's first relegation for 19 years was confirmed on 25 April with a 2–0 defeat away at Brighton. Yeovil ended their first Championship season, on 3 May, with a 4–1 home defeat against Middlesbrough.

== Summary and aftermath ==
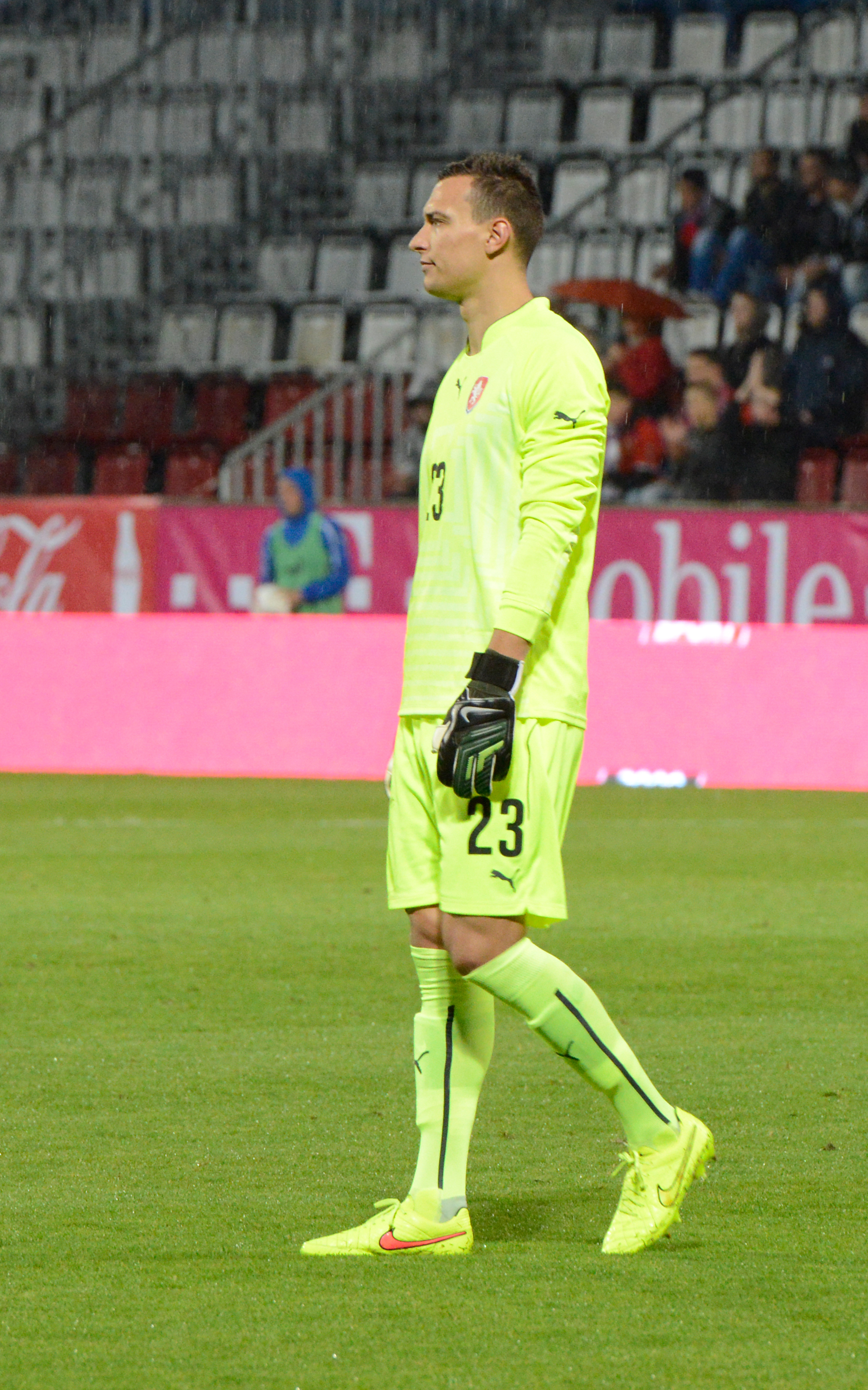
Marek Štěch made his international debut for the Czech Republic in June.

Yeovil occupied a relegation position for the majority of the season and from October until the end of the season. The team won 4 matches, drew 6 and lost 13 at home, compared to winning 4, drawing 7 and losing 12 away from home. Joe Edwards was an everpresent recording the highest number of appearances during the season, appearing in all 50 of Yeovil's matches. Nottingham Forest loanee Ishmael Miller was top scorer in all competitions with 10 goals, followed by James Hayter with 8 goals.

Following relegation, Yeovil released club captain Jamie McAllister, Rubén Palazuelos, Reuben Reid and Joey Jones, while James Hayter, Marek Štěch, Luke Ayling, Byron Webster and Seth Nana Twumasi were offered new contracts. Hayter, Twumasi, Calvin Brooks and Nathan Ralph all signed new contracts with the club. Marek Štěch rejected the offer of a new contract and signed for Sparta Prague, Byron Webster also rejected the offer of a new contract signing for Championship side Millwall. Defender Luke Ayling was the third player to reject the offer of a new contract but due to his age Yeovil received compensation from Bristol City for his transfer.

The off-season saw both Marek Štěch and Joel Grant make their full international debuts for the Czech Republic and Jamaica respectively.

== Club ==
The club's manager Gary Johnson, and Yeovil's backroom staff remained the same for the 2013–14 season, with Terry Skiverton as his assistant, former player Darren Way continuing as first team coach, Gareth Stewart as goalkeeping coach and Mike Micciche as physiotherapist after they all signed new two-year contracts in late May 2013. The only addition was the reappointment of former physiotherapist Simon Baker to assist Micciche. Yeovil's new home kit was first introduced prior to the 2013 Football League One play-off final and was designed by Sondico, with the design now boasting white sleeves and an entirely white back. For Yeovil's first two away matches of the season the club played in their new home kit whilst wearing green shorts, before on 23 August the club finally announced a new away kit with the same design as the home shirt but with the fluorescent yellow and black hoops on the front with the back being plain black with gold piping.

=== Coaching staff ===
Position	Staff
Manager	Gary Johnson
Assistant manager	Terry Skiverton
First team coach	Darren Way
Goalkeeping coach	Gareth Stewart
Head physio	Simon Baker
Assistant physio	Mike Micciche
Football analyst	Stuart Housley

=== Kit ===
Supplier: Sondico
Sponsor(s): W+S Recycling

Home	Home Alt	Away	Away Alt

== Transfers ==
=== In ===
Date	Name	From	Fee	Ref
1 July 2013	Joel Grant	Wycombe Wanderers	Free	
1 July 2013	Sam Hoskins	Southampton	Free (released)	
1 July 2013	Joey Jones	Leicester City	Free (released)	
10 July 2013	Kieffer Moore	Dorchester Town	Undisclosed (~ £15,000)	
19 July 2013	Danny Seaborne	Southampton	Free (released)	
30 July 2013	Liam Davis	Oxford United	Free (released)	
30 July 2013	Seth Nana Twumasi	Northampton Town	Free (released)	
17 August 2013	Chris Dunn	Coventry City	Free (released)	
1 January 2014	Adam Morgan	Liverpool	Free	
2 January 2014	Matteo Lanzoni	Oldham Athletic	Free (released)	
18 February 2014	Rubén Palazuelos	Honka	Free (released)	
22 March 2014	Calvin Brooks	Dorchester Town	Free (released)	

=== Out ===
Date	Name	To	Fee	Ref
31 August 2013	Lewis Young	Aldershot Town	Released	
23 December 2013	Matt Cafer	Weymouth	Released	
10 January 2014	Paddy Madden	Scunthorpe United	Undisclosed (~ £300,000)	
14 January 2014	Danny Seaborne	Coventry City	Free	
31 January 2014	Ed Upson	Millwall	Undisclosed (~ £100,000)	
30 June 2014	Joey Jones	Woking	Released	
30 June 2014	Jamie McAllister	Kerala Blasters	Released	
30 June 2014	Rubén Palazuelos	Ermis Aradippou	Released	
30 June 2014	Reuben Reid	Plymouth Argyle	Released	
30 June 2014	Chris Dunn	Cambridge United	Rejected new contract	
30 June 2014	Marek Štěch	Sparta Prague	Rejected new contract	
30 June 2014	Byron Webster	Millwall	Rejected new contract	

=== Loan in ===
Date	Name	From	End date	Ref
10 July 2013	Michael Ngoo	Liverpool	9 October 2013	
10 July 2013	Billy Clifford	Chelsea	25 August 2013	
23 July 2013	Alan Tate	Swansea City	5 September 2013	
15 August 2013	Joe Ralls	Cardiff City	5 January 2014	
17 August 2013	Sam Johnstone	Manchester United	20 August 2013	
21 August 2013	Wayne Hennessey	Wolverhampton Wanderers	17 November 2013	
23 August 2013	Andy Williams	Swindon Town	30 June 2014	
2 September 2013	Liam Fontaine	Bristol City	1 January 2014	
26 September 2013	Shane Duffy	Everton	27 December 2013	
17 October 2013	Fraser Fyvie	Wigan Athletic	16 December 2013	
18 November 2013	Stuart Taylor	Reading	20 November 2013	
28 November 2013	John Lundstram	Everton	10 March 2014	
28 November 2013	Ishmael Miller	Nottingham Forest	2 January 2014	
28 November 2013	Adam Morgan	Liverpool	1 January 2014	
1 January 2014	Shane Duffy	Everton	3 May 2014	
11 January 2014	Joe Ralls	Cardiff City	3 May 2014	
17 January 2014	Zoumana Bakayogo	Leicester City	21 January 2014	
23 January 2014	Ishmael Miller	Nottingham Forest	3 May 2014	
31 January 2014	Tom Lawrence	Manchester United	1 May 2014	
20 February 2014	Duane Holmes	Huddersfield Town	20 March 2014	

=== Loan out ===
Date	Name	To	End date	Ref
1 July 2013	Reuben Reid	Plymouth Argyle	3 May 2014	
9 August 2013	Matt Cafer	Willand Rovers	September 2013	
15 September 2013	Matt Cafer	Weymouth	23 December 2013	
28 November 2013	Danny Seaborne	Coventry City	5 January 2014	
31 January 2014	Joey Jones	Woking	26 April 2014	
7 March 2014	Sam Foley	Shrewsbury Town	16 April 2014	
28 March 2014	Calvin Brooks	Wincanton Town	30 April 2014	

== Match results ==
League positions are sourced from Statto, while the remaining contents of each table are sourced from the references in the "Ref" column.

=== Championship ===
Championship match details
Date	League position	Opponents	Venue	Result	Score F–A	Scorers	Attendance	Ref
3 August 2013	10th	Millwall	A	W	1–0	Upson	12,404	
10 August 2013	14th	Birmingham City	H	L	0–1		8,717	
17 August 2013	18th	Burnley	A	L	0–2		10,085	
24 August 2013	19th	Derby County	H	L	0–3		7,047	
31 August 2013	22nd	Reading	H	L	0–1		7,306	
14 September 2013	21st	Sheffield Wednesday	A	D	1–1	Ralls	22,328	
17 September 2013	22nd	Ipswich Town	A	L	1–2	Grant	15,340	
21 September 2013	22nd	Queens Park Rangers	H	L	0–1		9,108	
28 September 2013	21st	Bolton Wanderers	A	D	1–1	Upson	14,716	
1 October 2013	22nd	Leicester City	H	L	1–2	Hayter (pen)	6,476	
5 October 2013	23rd	Middlesbrough	A	L	1–4	Davis	13,181	
19 October 2013	24th	Brighton & Hove Albion	H	D	0–0		6,873	
26 October 2013	22nd	Nottingham Forest	H	W	3–1	Upson (2), Webster	7,612	
2 November 2013	24th	Leeds United	A	L	0–2		25,351	
10 November 2013	24th	Wigan Athletic	H	L	0–1		6,149	
22 November 2013	24th	Doncaster Rovers	A	L	1–2	Webster	6,620	
30 November 2013	22nd	Watford	A	W	3–0	Webster, Miller, Edwards	15,263	
3 December 2013	22nd	Blackpool	H	W	1–0	Lundstram	5,530	
7 December 2013	22nd	Charlton Athletic	H	D	2–2	Morrison (og), Miller (pen)	6,053	
14 December 2013	23rd	Barnsley	A	D	1–1	Grant	13,361	
21 December 2013	23rd	Blackburn Rovers	H	L	0–1		7,179	
26 December 2013	23rd	Bournemouth	A	L	0–3		10,717	
29 December 2013	23rd	Huddersfield Town	A	L	1–5	Miller	12,946	
11 January 2014	23rd	Burnley	H	L	1–2	Moore	6,293	
18 January 2014	23rd	Birmingham City	A	W	2–0	Hayter (2)	13,605	
28 January 2014	24th	Derby County	A	L	2–3	Lundstram, Miller	23,615	
2 February 2014	24th	Nottingham Forest	A	L	1–3	Moore	21,393	
8 February 2014	24th	Leeds United	H	L	1–2	Miller	7,984	
11 February 2014	24th	Millwall	H	D	1–1	Ralls	4,463	
18 February 2014	24th	Watford	H	D	0–0		6,042	
22 February 2014	24th	Doncaster Rovers	H	W	1–0	Hayter (pen)	4,934	
1 March 2014	23rd	Reading	A	D	1–1	Duffy	18,697	
8 March 2014	22nd	Sheffield Wednesday	H	W	2–0	Miller (2)	6,251	
11 March 2014	22nd	Ipswich Town	H	L	0–1		5,290	
15 March 2014	23rd	Queens Park Rangers	A	L	0–3		16,667	
18 March 2014	23rd	Wigan Athletic	A	D	3–3	Miller (2), Ayling	12,970	
22 March 2014	23rd	Bolton Wanderers	H	D	2–2	Miller, Dawson	6,344	
25 March 2014	22nd	Leicester City	A	D	1–1	Ralls	26,240	
29 March 2014	24th	Barnsley	H	L	1–4	Ayling	6,579	
5 April 2014	24th	Blackpool	A	W	2–1	Hayter (pen), Lawrence	13,310	
8 April 2014	24th	Charlton Athletic	A	L	2–3	Grant, Moore	15,430	
12 April 2014	23rd	Bournemouth	H	D	1–1	Moore	6,931	
18 April 2014	24th	Blackburn Rovers	A	D	0–0		14,353	
21 April 2014	24th	Huddersfield Town	H	L	1–2	Lawrence	5,903	
25 April 2014	24th	Brighton & Hove Albion	A	L	0–2		26,901	
3 May 2014	24th	Middlesbrough	H	L	1–4	Hayter	6,477	

==== League table ====
Pos	Team	Pld	W	D	L	GF	GA	GD	Pts	Promotion, qualification or relegation
20	Blackpool	46	11	13	22	38	66	−28	46	
21	Birmingham City	46	11	11	24	58	74	−16	44	
22	Doncaster Rovers (R)	46	11	11	24	39	70	−31	44	Relegation to Football League One
23	Barnsley (R)	46	9	12	25	44	77	−33	39	Relegation to Football League One
24	Yeovil Town (R)	46	8	13	25	44	75	−31	37	Relegation to Football League One

Source: BBC Sport
Rules for classification: 1) points; 2) goal difference; 3) number of goals scored
(R) Relegated

=== FA Cup ===
FA Cup match details
Round	Date	Opponents	Venue	Result	Score F–A	Scorers	Attendance	Ref
Third round	4 January 2014	Leyton Orient	H	W	4–0	Hayter (2), Grant, Moore	3,667	
Fourth round	25 January 2014	Southampton	A	L	0–2		24,070	

=== League Cup ===
League Cup match details
Round	Date	Opponents	Venue	Result	Score F–A	Scorers	Attendance	Ref
First round	6 August 2013	Southend United	A	W	1–0	Dawson	2,971	
Second round	27 August 2013	Birmingham City	H	D	3–3^{[A]}	Upson, Webster, Ayling	3,767	

== Squad statistics ==
Numbers in parentheses denote appearances as substitute.
Players with squad numbers struck through and marked † left the club during the playing season.
Players with names in italics and marked * were on loan from another club for the whole of their season with Yeovil.
Players listed with no appearances have been in the matchday squad but only as unused substitutes.
Key to positions: GK – Goalkeeper; DF – Defender; MF – Midfielder; FW – Forward

No.	Pos.	Nat.	Name	Apps	Goals	Apps	Goals	Apps	Goals	Apps	Goals	Yellow card	Red card
No.	Pos.	Nat.	Name	League		FA Cup		League Cup		Total		Discipline	
1	GK	CZE	Marek Štěch	26	0	2	0	1	0	29	0	0	0
2	DF	ENG	Luke Ayling	41 (1)	2	2	0	2	1	45 (1)	3	7	0
3	DF	SCO	Jamie McAllister	35 (3)	0	1	0	1	0	37 (3)	0	9	0
4	MF	ENG	Joe Edwards	46	1	2	0	2	0	50	1	8	0
5	DF	ENG	Byron Webster	40 (1)	3	2	0	2	1	44 (1)	4	7	2
~~6~~ †	DF	ENG	Danny Seaborne	10	0	0	0	1	0	11	0	3	0
~~6~~ †	DF	CIV	Zoumana Bakayogo *	1	0	0	0	0	0	1	0	0	0
7	MF	IRL	Kevin Dawson	17 (18)	1	1	0	1 (1)	1	19 (19)	2	7	0
~~8~~ †	MF	ENG	Ed Upson	21 (3)	4	0 (2)	0	1 (1)	1	23 (5)	5	7	0
8	MF	ESP	Rubén Palazuelos	6 (3)	0	0	0	0	0	6 (3)	0	1	0
9	FW	ENG	James Hayter	24 (13)	6	2	2	1	0	27 (13)	8	1	0
10	MF	IRL	Sam Foley	4 (3)	0	1 (1)	0	0	0	5 (4)	0	1	0
~~11~~ †	FW	ENG	Michael Ngoo *	1 (5)	0	0	0	1	0	2 (5)	0	0	0
~~11~~ †	MF	SCO	Fraser Fyvie *	2	0	0	0	0	0	2	0	0	0
~~11~~ †	FW	WAL	Tom Lawrence *	17 (2)	2	0	0	0	0	17 (2)	2	3	0
12	GK	ENG	Gareth Stewart	0 (1)	0	0	0	0	0	0 (1)	0	0	0
13	FW	ENG	Kieffer Moore	10 (10)	4	0 (2)	1	1 (1)	0	11 (13)	5	2	1
14	FW	ENG	Sam Hoskins	6 (13)	0	0	0	1 (1)	0	7 (14)	0	4	0
15	DF	IRL	Shane Duffy *	37	1	2	0	0	0	39	1	7	0
~~17~~ †	FW	IRL	Paddy Madden	7 (2)	0	0	0	0 (1)	0	7 (3)	0	1	0
~~18~~ †	DF	ENG	Alan Tate *	4	0	0	0	1 (1)	0	5 (1)	0	0	0
18	DF	ITA	Matteo Lanzoni	2 (4)	0	0	0	0	0	2 (4)	0	0	0
19	MF	ENG	Joe Ralls *	33 (4)	3	1	0	0	0	34 (4)	3	10	1
~~20~~ †	MF	ENG	Billy Clifford *	0	0	0	0	1	0	1	0	0	0
~~20~~ †	DF	ENG	Liam Fontaine *	4 (1)	0	0	0	0	0	4 (1)	0	1	0
~~20~~ †	MF	USA	Duane Holmes *	5	0	0	0	0	0	5	0	0	0
21	MF	ENG	Liam Davis	18 (9)	1	1	0	2	0	21 (9)	1	3	0
22	DF	NIR	Joey Jones	0	0	0	0	0	0	0	0	0	0
23	MF	JAM	Joel Grant	27 (7)	3	2	1	2	0	31 (7)	4	4	0
24	GK	ENG	Chris Dunn	7 (1)	0	0	0	0	0	7 (1)	0	0	0
~~25~~ †	GK	ENG	Sam Johnstone *	1	0	0	0	0	0	1	0	0	0
26	DF	ENG	Seth Nana Twumasi	0 (3)	0	0	0	0	0	0 (3)	0	1	0
~~27~~ †	GK	WAL	Wayne Hennessey *	13	0	0	0	1	0	14	0	0	0
27	FW	ENG	Ishmael Miller *	19	10	1	0	0	0	20	10	1	0
28	FW	ENG	Andy Williams *	7 (2)	0	0	0	0	0	7 (2)	0	1	0
29	FW	ENG	Adam Morgan	4 (8)	0	0 (1)	0	0	0	4 (9)	0	0	0
~~31~~ †	MF	ENG	John Lundstram *	13 (1)	2	2	0	0	0	15 (1)	2	3	0

Players not included in matchday squads
No.	Pos.	Nat.	Name
~~15~~ †	MF	ENG	Lewis Young
16	DF	ENG	Nathan Ralph
~~25~~ †	GK	ENG	Stuart Taylor *
~~41~~ †	GK	ENG	Matt Cafer
—	DF	ENG	Calvin Brooks
—	FW	ENG	Reuben Reid

=== Suspensions ===
Player	Date Received	Offence	Length of suspension	
Byron Webster	(red card) v Sheffield Wednesday, 14 September	Violent conduct	3 matches	Ipswich Town (A), Queens Park Rangers (H), Bolton Wanderers (A), Championship
Ed Upson	(yellow card) v Leeds United, 2 November	5 cautions	1 match	Wigan Athletic (H), Championship
Luke Ayling	(yellow card) v Blackburn Rovers, 21 December	5 cautions	1 match	Bournemouth (A), Championship
Danny Seaborne	Suspended whilst on loan at Coventry City	Violent conduct	1 match	Burnley (H), Championship
Joe Ralls	(red card) v Reading, 1 March	Serious foul play	3 matches	Sheffield Wednesday (H), Ipswich Town (H), Queens Park Rangers (A), Championship
Kieffer Moore	(yellow card) (yellow-red card) v Reading, 1 March	Second bookable offence	1 match	Sheffield Wednesday (H), Championship

== See also ==
- 2013–14 in English football
- List of Yeovil Town F.C. seasons

== Footnotes ==
A. Birmingham City won 3–2 in a penalty shootout following a 3–3 draw after extra time.
