= Chris Dunn (footballer) =

English footballer (born 1987)

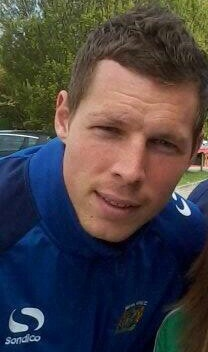
- Dunn in 2014

Personal information
- Full name: Christopher Michael Dunn
- Date of birth: 23 October 1987 (age 39)
- Place of birth: Havering, London, England
- Height: 6 ft 5 in (1.96 m)
- Position: Goalkeeper

Youth career
- 2005–2006: Northampton Town

Senior career*
Years	Team	Apps	(Gls)
2006–2011	Northampton Town	98	(0)
2011–2013	Coventry City	3	(0)
2013–2014	Yeovil Town	8	(0)
2014–2016	Cambridge United	54	(0)
2016–2018	Wrexham	54	(0)
2018–2019	Walsall	4	(0)
2019–2020	Maidenhead United	16	(0)
- * Club domestic league appearances and goals as of 19:44, 19 March 2020 (UTC)

Christopher Michael Dunn (born 23 October 1987) is an English football goalkeeper.

== Career ==
=== Northampton Town ===
Dunn started his career as a youth at West Ham United. At 14 he moved to Southend United then signed for Northampton Town's centre of excellence in January 2005 after moving from Brentwood when he was seventeen. After a year playing youth and reserve football, Dunn was made a squad number as cover for Lee Harper in the 2005–06 season by then manager Colin Calderwood. For the following two seasons, Dunn was an understudy to Mark Bunn. On 3 May 2008, Dunn was given the opportunity to make his début in the last game of the 2007–08 season to gain first-team experience. The game was at home to Tranmere Rovers and Northampton Town won 2–1.

Bunn was sold near the end of the 2008 summer transfer window to Blackburn Rovers, which meant Dunn was selected as first choice for the forthcoming season. After appearing in a handful of first team appearances, Dunn was at fault for conceding one of the goals in a 3–2 loss against Huddersfield Town on 20 September 2008, prompting Manager Stuart Gray to defend him to the press. Following this, Dunn lost his first choice status to loan Frank Fielding. After Fielding returned to his parent, Dunn regained his first choice goalkeeper status despite the club signing Ron-Robert Zieler shortly after and made his return to the first team on 13 December 2008, in a 4–4 thriller draw against Scunthorpe United, followed up by keeping a clean sheet in the next game against Carlisle United on 20 December 2008. Dunn remained as first choice goalkeeper for the rest of the season. Dunn signed a new two-year contract on 11 May 2009.

During the 2009–10 season, Dunn was the regular goalkeeper and went on a run of five clean sheets in a row without conceding a goal in 524 minutes. This took him to third place in the record number of minutes without conceding a goal for Northampton Town behind Alan Starling and Len Hammond. This record ended on 26 January 2010 when he conceded a goal against Darlington from Tadhg Purcell despite winning 2–1. In February that season Dunn was nominated for the PFA League 2 Player of the Month award, but lost out to Wayne Brown before suffering an injury that kept him out for three weeks. Loan signing Jason Steele finished the season in goal with Dunn making thirty-two appearances in all competitions.

Dunn made his first appearance of the season on 4 September 2010, in a 1–1 draw against Aldershot Town. During the 2010–11 season Dunn played in Northampton Town's third round League Cup win against Liverpool at Anfield. Later that season, Dunn was awarded the PFA Fans Player of the Month for December after consecutive clean sheets and impressive performances. Following this, Dunn continued to remain as a first choice goalkeeper until he suffered a head injury that saw him substituted just eight minutes in against Bury on 9 April 2011. Dunn made his return to the first team on 30 April 2011, where he wore a protective mask, and kept a clean sheet, in a 2–0 win over Stevenage. At the end of the 2010–11 season, Dunn finished the season, making forty-four appearances in all competitions.

With his contract expiring at the end of the season, Dunn was offered a new contract by the club. It came after when his future at Coventry City was uncertain and it was believed that he was expecting to leave the club to progress his career.

=== Coventry City ===
On 30 June 2011, Coventry City confirmed the signing of Chris Dunn on a three-year contract; as Dunn was under 24, an undisclosed fee was agreed between the two clubs. It came after when Coventry City made a transfer bid for Dunn around mid-June.

Dunn made his début for the club on 10 September 2011, as a half-time substitute for Joe Murphy in a 2–0 win against Derby County. He also made another sub appearance, where he continued to help the club keep a clean for the remaining 15 minutes, in the 1–0 win over Nottingham Forest on 15 October 2011. His first competitive appearance for the Sky Blues was in the 2–1 FA Cup defeat to Southampton on 7 January 2012. However, throughout the 2011–12 season, Dunn remained a second choice goalkeeper behind Murphy and made three appearances in all competitions.

The 2012–13 season saw Dunn continuing to remain a second choice goalkeeper behind Murphy for the second time this season and it wasn't until on 1 December 2012 when he made his first appearance of the season, in the first round of FA Cup, in a 2–1 win over Morecambe. It wasn't until the last game of the season on 27 April 2013 when he made his first Coventry City league start, in a 2–2 draw against Notts County.

On 16 August 2013, Dunn had his contract at Coventry City terminated by mutual consent.

=== Yeovil Town ===
On 17 August 2013, Dunn signed for Football League Championship side Yeovil Town on a one-year contract, to be reunited with manager Gary Johnson whom he worked under at Northampton Town.

After Wayne Hennessey became the first choice goalkeeper until he returned to Wolves, Dunn made his Yeovil debut in their 2–1 defeat against Doncaster Rovers, on 22 November 2013, followed by back to back clean sheets away to Watford and home to Blackpool, earning Dunn a place in the Championship Team of the Week.

Dunn came on as a substitute in a second half for Marek Štěch, conceding two goals as Yeovil Town lost 5–1 against Huddersfield Town on 29 December 2013. As the season progressed, Štěch continued to remain the first choice goalkeeper, which Dunn stated the competition between the two is good. After Štěch was absent, Dunn played two matches on 5 April 2014 and 8 April 2014 against Blackpool and Charlton Athletic, which Yeovil Town won 2–1 and lost 3–2 respectively.

After finishing the 2013–14 season, making eight appearances for the club in all competitions, Dunn was offered a new contract by the club. However, it appeared that Dunn rejected a new contract from the club, confirming his departure.

=== Cambridge United ===
Dunn agreed a 2-year deal to join Cambridge United on 10 June 2014 for the U's return season in the Football League. Upon joining the club, Dunn was given a number one shirt ahead of a new season.

Dunn made his Cambridge United debut, in the opening game of the season, where he kept a clean and played the whole game, in a 1–0 win over Plymouth Argyle. After earning one point in the next two matches, Dunn was able to keep another clean sheet, in a 5–0 win over Carlisle United on 30 August 2014. On 23 January 2015, Dunn played a vital role in the club's shock FA Cup 4th Round 0–0 draw with Manchester United, forcing a replay with the Premiership side. Manchester United won 3–0 in the replay at Old Trafford on 3 February 2015. Dunn was the first-choice goalkeeper at the Abbey Stadium for the 2014–15 season, making 51 competitive appearances.

In the 2015–16 season, Dunn made his first appearance of the season, in a 2–1 win over Wimbledon on 18 August 2015. However, in a 1–0 loss against Wycombe Wanderers on 29 September 2015, Dunn received a straight red card in the 53rd minute after fouling Gozie Ugwu in the penalty box. The resulting penalty was saved from Garry Thompson. Dunn served his suspension, and it wasn't until on 30 October 2015 when he made his return, in a 2–1 loss against Bristol Rovers. Only a few more appearances followed with Dunn finishing his second season making thirteen appearances in all competitions.

Dunn was released by the club, with the club finishing ninth place in the league.

=== Wrexham ===
On 22 July 2016, Dunn joined National League side Wrexham on a one-year deal as a player and goalkeeping coach. Upon joining the club, Dunn was given a number twenty-four shirt ahead of a new season.

Despite being the goalkeeping coach, Dunn was favoured to start the season making his debut for the club on the opening day of the 2016–17 season, keeping a clean sheet in a 0–0 draw with Dover Athletic. Dunn made two more appearances before illness kept him sidelined for their next match, and Shwan Jalal replaced Dunn in goal on 16 August 2016 in a 1–0 victory over Solihull Moors. Dunn returned to the first team as an unused substitute, in a 2–1 win over Bromley on 22 October 2016. On 5 November 2016, Dunn made his first team return since August, where he played 68 minutes, in a 0–0 draw against North Ferriby United. From the turn of the year, Dunn was ever present in goal for the Reds making 14-consecutive appearances.

For the 2017–18 season, Dunn was given the no1 squad number, keeping 15 clean sheets in 35 matches.

He was released by Wrexham in May 2018.

=== Walsall ===
On 30 June 2018 Walsall announced the signing of Dunn on a one-year deal.

He made four league starts keeping two clean sheets.

He was released by Walsall at the end of the 2018–19 season.

=== Maidenhead United ===
Dunn joined Maidenhead United for the 2019–20 season. Dunn made 21 appearances, before the season was curtailed by the coronavirus outbreak. He left the club at the end of the season.

== Career statistics ==
As of 14 March 2020

Appearances and goals by club, season and competition
Club	Season	League			FA Cup		League Cup		Other		Total	
Club	Season	Division	Apps	Goals	Apps	Goals	Apps	Goals	Apps	Goals	Apps	Goals
Northampton Town	2006–07	League One	0	0	0	0	0	0	0	0	0	0
Northampton Town	2007–08	League One	1	0	0	0	0	0	0	0	1	0
Northampton Town	2008–09	League One	29	0	0	0	0	0	1 (Note: Appearances in Football League Trophy)	0	30	0
Northampton Town	2009–10	League Two	29	0	2	0	1	0	3	0	35	0
Northampton Town	2010–11	League Two	39	0	2	0	2	0	1	0	44	0
Northampton Town	Northampton Town Total		98	0	4	0	3	0	5	0	110	0
Coventry City	2011–12	Championship	2	0	1	0	0	0	—		3	0
Coventry City	2012–13	League One	1	0	1	0	0	0	1	0	3	0
Coventry City	Coventry City Total		3	0	2	0	0	0	1	0	6	0
Yeovil Town	2013–14	Championship	8	0	0	0	0	0	—		8	0
Cambridge United	2014–15	League Two	43	0	6	0	1	0	1	0	51	0
Cambridge United	2015–16	League Two	11	0	1	0	1	0	0	0	13	0
Cambridge United	Cambridge United Total		54	0	7	0	2	0	1	0	64	0
Wrexham	2016–17	National League	19	0	0	0	0	0	0	0	19	0
Wrexham	2017–18	National League	35	0	1	0	0	0	0	0	36	0
Wrexham	Wrexham Total		54	0	1	0	0	0	0	0	55	0
Walsall	2018–19	League One	4	0	0	0	2	0	3	0	9	0
Maidenhead United	2019–20	National League	16	0	3	0	0	0	2 (Note: Appearances in FA Trophy)	0	21	0
Career totals			237	0	17	0	7	0	12	0	273	0

== Personal life ==
Growing up in Brentwood, Essex, Dunn attended St Martin School.
