= Joey Jones (footballer, born 1994) =

Association football player (born 1994)

Personal information
- Full name: Joseph Dylan Jones
- Date of birth: 15 April 1994 (age 32)
- Place of birth: Kingston upon Thames, England
- Positions: Midfielder; defender

Team information
- Current team: Sholing (player-coach)
- Number: 22

Youth career
- 2007–2010: Arsenal
- 2010–2013: Leicester City

Senior career*
Years	Team	Apps	(Gls)
2013–2014	Yeovil Town	0	(0)
2014	→ Woking (loan)	12	(2)
2014–2018	Woking	162	(10)
2018–2019	Eastleigh	32	(2)
2019–2020	Salford City	21	(0)
2020–2022	Dagenham & Redbridge	31	(0)
2022	→ Grimsby Town (loan)	6	(0)
2022–2023	Solihull Moors	19	(0)
2023–2024	Altrincham	9	(0)
2024–2026	Walton & Hersham	76	(4)
2026–	Sholing	0	(0)

International career
- Northern Ireland U16
	Northern Ireland U17	9	(1)
2012	Northern Ireland U19	3	(1)
2012	Northern Ireland U21	1	(0)
- * Club domestic league appearances and goals as of 20:02, 3 September 2026 (UTC)

Joseph Dylan Jones (born 15 April 1994) is a footballer who plays as a midfielder for Southern League Premier Division South club Sholing.

Despite being born in England, he won caps for Northern Ireland up until under-21 level. He spent time in the youth-teams at Arsenal, Leicester City and Yeovil Town, before signing with Woking in July 2014 after a successful loan spell He spent four years with the club, before joining Eastleigh in June 2018. He was signed by English Football League club Salford City in June 2019 and has also played for Dagenham & Redbridge and Grimsby Town. Jones went onto feature for Solihull Moors and Altrincham briefly before a move to Southern League Premier Division South club Walton & Hersham in 2024. In September 2026, Jones joined Sholing as a player-coach.

== Club career ==
On 26 June 2013, he signed a six-month contract with Championship club Yeovil Town. On 10 September, a Yeovil XI played a Bournemouth XI in a behind closed doors friendly and Jones was one of the goalscorers for the "Glovers". His contract was later extended until the end of the 2013–14 season. On 31 January, he joined Conference Premier club Woking on an initial one-month loan, which was later extended into a second month. He made his debut in senior football in Woking's 5–1 defeat at Dartford and was sent off on 34 minutes for a foul on Jim Stevenson. On 29 March, he scored his first goal in a 2–1 win over Wrexham at the Kingfield Stadium. He scored two goals in 12 games during his loan spell, but left Huish Park after he was released by Yeovil in May 2014.

On 14 July 2014, Jones signed a permanent deal with Woking. He made 50 appearances across the 2014–15 season, as the "Cards" narrowly missed out on a play-off place. He signed a new one-year deal in May 2015, having rejected approaches from Cheltenham Town (managed by former Yeovil boss Gary Johnson) and Dover Athletic, and stated that he hoped to nail down a more clearly defined and settled role in the team following discussions with Garry Hill and the departure of central midfielder Josh Payne. He scored five goals from 47 games in the 2015–16 campaign as the "Cardinals" posted a 12th-place finish. On 25 February 2017, he scored a goal from 40-yards in a 4–3 defeat to Forest Green Rovers that later won him the club's goal of the season award. He signed a new contract with Woking in May 2017, having hit five goals from 50 games in the 2016–17 campaign, helping Woking to finish three points above the relegation zone. He made 36 appearances across the 2017–18 season, scoring one goal, as Woking were relegated out of the National League.

On 29 June 2018, Jones signed with Andy Hessenthaler's Eastleigh. He scored two goals from 35 matches in the 2018–19 season, featuring in the National League play-off quarter-final defeat at Wrexham. He was offered a new contract by manager Ben Strevens.

On 4 June 2019, Jones signed a two-year deal with newly promoted EFL League Two side Salford City. He made his debut in the English Football League on 10 August, coming on for Mark Shelton at half-time in a 2–0 defeat at Crawley Town. He left the club by mutual consent on 9 November 2020.

On 10 November 2020, Jones signed for National League side Dagenham & Redbridge until June 2022. On 25 March 2022, Jones joined National League promotion rivals Grimsby Town on loan for the remainder of the 2021–22 season. Upon signing for Grimsby, Jones told local news that he would be looking to move away from Dagenham on a permanent basis when his contract expires in the summer. On 1 June 2022, Dagenham announced that they would be releasing Jones at the end of his contract.

On 1 July 2022, Jones signed for National League side Solihull Moors on a one-year deal. He was released by the club at the end of the 2022–23 season.

On 15 June 2023, Jones signed for National League side Altrincham.

On 19 June 2024, Jones joined Southern League Premier Division South side Walton & Hersham.

After two years at Walton & Hersham, Jones agreed to join Sholing for an undisclosed fee, signing as a player-coach.

== International career ==
Eligible to represent Northern Ireland due to his father, Dave, he was capped at all youth-team ages up until receiving an under-21 cap against Hungary on 15 August 2012.

== Style of play ==
Jones describes himself as a central midfielder who likes "to get about the park, get on the ball.... [and I have a good] passing range [so] I'm going to bring a lot of different passes and shots".

== Career statistics ==
As of 15 August 2026

Appearances and goals by club, season and competition
Club	Season	League			FA Cup		EFL Cup		Other		Total	
Club	Season	Division	Apps	Goals	Apps	Goals	Apps	Goals	Apps	Goals	Apps	Goals
Yeovil Town	2013–14	Championship	0	0	0	0	0	0	—		0	0
Woking (loan)	2013–14	Conference Premier	12	2	—		—		—		12	2
Woking	2014–15	Conference Premier	43	0	2	0	—		5 (Note: Appearances in FA Trophy)	0	50	0
Woking	2015–16	National League	43	5	1	0	—		3	0	47	5
Woking	2016–17	National League	45	4	3	1	—		2	0	50	5
Woking	2017–18	National League	31	1	5	0	—		0	0	36	1
Woking	Total		174	12	11	1	—		10	0	195	13
Eastleigh	2018–19	National League	32	2	1	0	—		2 (Note: One appearance in the FA Trophy and one appearance in National League play-offs)	0	35	2
Salford City	2019–20	League Two	20	0	2	0	1	0	3 (Note: Appearances in EFL Trophy)	0	26	0
Salford City	2020–21	League Two	1	0	0	0	0	0	0	0	1	0
Salford City	Total		21	0	2	0	1	0	3	0	27	0
Dagenham & Redbridge	2020–21	National League	17	0	0	0	—		0	0	17	0
Dagenham & Redbridge	2021–22	National League	14	0	2	0	—		3	0	19	0
Dagenham & Redbridge	Total		31	0	2	0	—		3	0	36	0
Grimsby Town (loan)	2021–22	National League	6	0	—		—		—		6	0
Solihull Moors	2022–23	National League	19	0	1	0	—		1	0	21	0
Altrincham	2023–24	National League	9	0	0	0	—		0	0	9	0
Walton & Hersham	2024–25	Southern League Premier Division South	40	3	4	1	—		2 (Note: One appearance in the FA Trophy, one in the Southern League Premier Division South play-offs)	0	46	4
Walton & Hersham	2025–26	Southern League Premier Division South	35	1	2	0	—		4	0	41	1
Walton & Hersham	2026–27	National League South	1	0	0	0	—		0	0	1	0
Walton & Hersham	Total		76	4	6	1	—		6	0	88	5
Sholing	2026–27	Southern League Premier Division South	0	0	0	0	—		0	0	0	0
Career total			368	18	23	2	1	0	25	0	417	20

== Honours ==
Grimsby Town

- National League play-off winners: 2022

Walton & Hersham

- Southern League Premier Division South winners: 2025–26
