= 2013 Football League One play-off final =

Football match

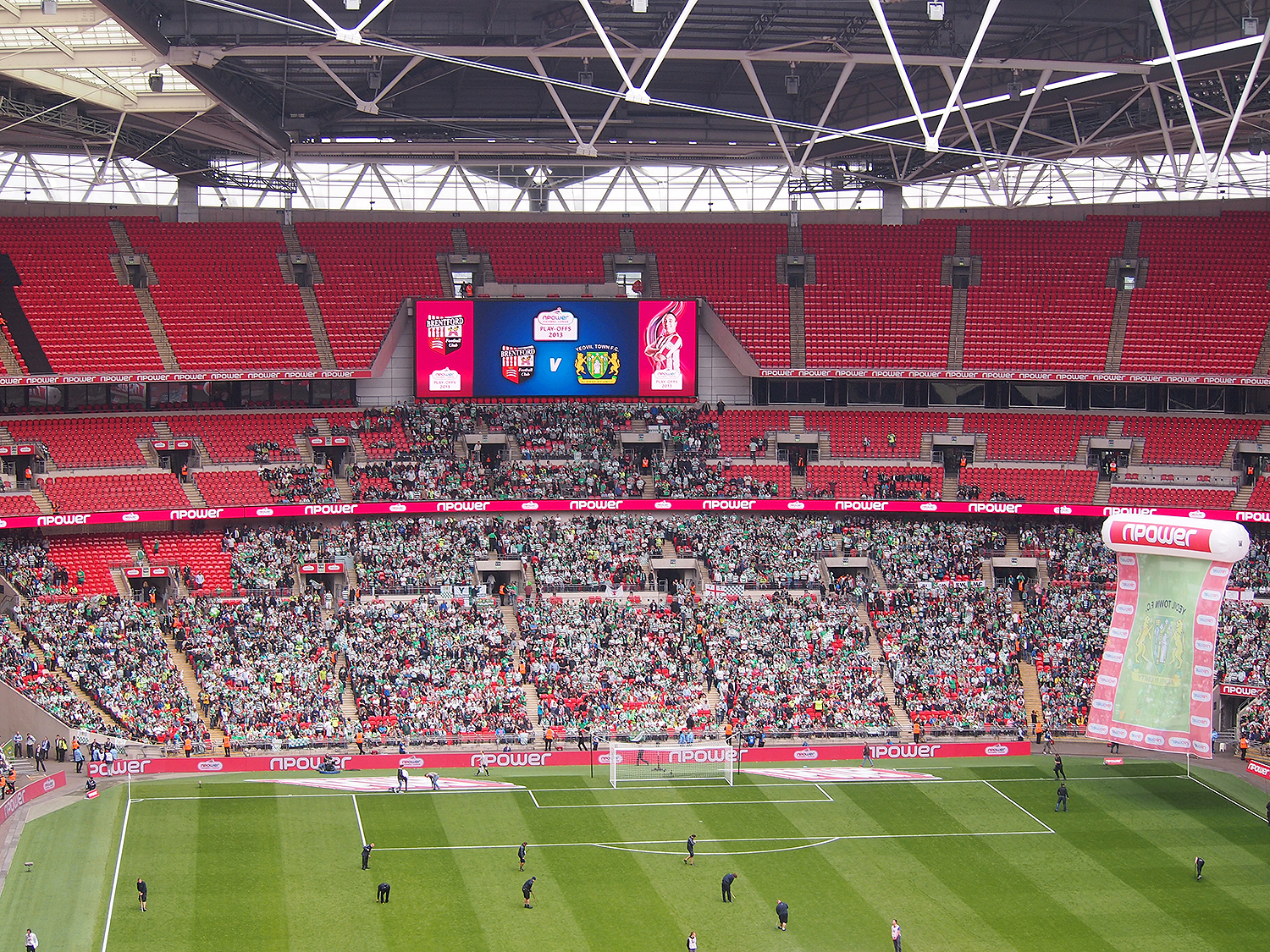
- Yeovil Town supporters at Wembley before the kick-off
| Brentford | Yeovil Town |
| 1 | 2 |
- Date: 19 May 2013
- Venue: Wembley Stadium, London
- Referee: Andy D'Urso
- Attendance: 41,955

The 2013 Football League One play-off final was an association football match which was played on 19 May 2013 at Wembley Stadium, London, between Brentford and Yeovil Town to determine the third and final team to gain promotion from Football League One to the Football League Championship. The top two teams of the 2012–13 Football League One season, Doncaster Rovers and Bournemouth, gained automatic promotion to the Championship, while the teams placed from third to sixth place in the table took part in play-off semi-finals; the winners of these semi-finals competed for the final place for the 2013–14 season in the Championship.

The match kicked off around 1:30 p.m. in front of 41,955 spectators and was refereed by Andy D'Urso. On six minutes, Yeovil's Paddy Madden made it 1–0 with a shot from the edge of the Brentford penalty area with the outside of his right boot into the top-right corner of Simon Moore's goal. In the 42nd minute, Dan Burn doubled the lead with a header. Six minutes into the second half, Brentford's Harlee Dean scored with a header from Forrester's corner. Despite pressure from Brentford with Stech saving attempts from Clayton Donaldson, Adam Forshaw and Bradley Wright-Phillips, the score remained 2–1 and Yeovil were promoted to the Championship.

Yeovil Town ended the following season bottom of the Football League Championship, and were relegated back to League One. Brentford finished second in League One in their next season, and gained automatic promotion to the Championship for the 2014–15 season.

== Route to the final ==
Football League One final table, leading positions
| Pos | Team | Pld | W | D | L | GF | GA | GD | Pts |
|---|---|---|---|---|---|---|---|---|---|
| 1 | Doncaster Rovers | 46 | 25 | 9 | 12 | 62 | 44 | +18 | 84 |
| 2 | Bournemouth | 46 | 24 | 11 | 11 | 76 | 53 | +23 | 83 |
| 3 | Brentford | 46 | 21 | 16 | 9 | 62 | 47 | +15 | 79 |
| 4 | Yeovil Town | 46 | 23 | 8 | 15 | 71 | 56 | +15 | 77 |
| 5 | Sheffield United | 46 | 19 | 18 | 9 | 56 | 42 | +14 | 75 |
| 6 | Swindon Town | 46 | 20 | 14 | 12 | 72 | 39 | +33 | 74 |

Brentford finished the regular 2012–13 season in third place in Football League One, the third tier of the English football league system, one place ahead of Yeovil Town. Both therefore missed out on the two automatic places for promotion to the Football League Championship, the second tier of English football, and instead took part in the play-offs to determine the third promoted team. Brentford finished four points behind Bournemouth (who were promoted in second place) and five behind league winners Doncaster Rovers. Yeovil Town ended the season two points behind Brentford.

Yeovil Town's opponents for their play-off semi-final were Sheffield United and the first match of the two-legged tie was played on 3 May 2013 at Bramall Lane in Sheffield. The first half ended goalless with the best chance falling to Barry Robson; his free kick went just wide of the Yeovil goalpost. Callum McFadzean came on after half-time to replace Robson and within a minute of the second half, his shot deflected past Marek Štěch in the Yeovil goal to give Sheffield United the advantage. Both sides had further chances to score but the match ended 1–0. The second leg of the semi-final took place three days later at Huish Park in Yeovil. Kevin Dawson levelled the tie on aggregate when he put the home side ahead on five minutes after a pass from Ed Upson. Sheffield United's Jamie Murphy struck the Yeovil bar with a shot before Upson scored from a Paddy Madden cross with five minutes remaining to make the final score 2–0 and to send his side to Wembley with a 2–1 aggregate victory.

Brentford faced Swindon Town in the other semi-final and the first leg was played on 4 May 2013 at the County Ground in Swindon. After a goalless first half, Swindon's Massimo Luongo opened the scoring in the 70th minute with a curling shot from the edge of the penalty area. In injury time, Luongo fouled Harry Forrester in the Swindon box to concede a penalty. The spot kick was scored by Kevin O'Connor and the match ended 1–1. The second leg of the semi-final was held at Griffin Park in Brentford two days later. The home side dominated the early play and went ahead midway through the half after Adam Rooney steered the ball into his own net from a corner. Brentford doubled their lead in the 40th minute when Clayton Donaldson struck from the edge of the Swindon penalty area. Rooney scored four minutes later to make it 2–1 to the home side before Donaldson scored with a chip early in the second half. Joe Devera's 57th-minute volley made it 3–2 and in injury time Aden Flint's headed goal levelled the match at 3–3, and the aggregate score at 4–4. Despite Swindon's Nathan Byrne being sent off after receiving a second yellow card for handball, the extra-time period ended goalless and the game went to a penalty shootout. The first six spot kicks were converted before Miles Storey's strike was saved by the Brentford goalkeeper Simon Moore. No other penalties were missed and Brentford won 5–4 in the shootout to progress to Wembley.

== Match ==
=== Background ===
This was Brentford's third appearance in the third-tier play-off finals, having lost both the 1997 Football League Second Division play-off final 1–0 against Crewe Alexandra and the 2002 Football League Second Division play-off final 2–0 against Stoke City. They had also lost in the semi-finals of the 1991, 1995, 2005 and 2006 play-offs. Yeovil Town had made one appearance in the play-off finals where they were beaten 2–0 by Blackpool in the 2007 Football League One play-off final. Brentford had played in League One since their promotion from League Two in the 2008–09 season as champions, while Yeovil had been promoted to League One after finishing top of 2004–05 Football League Two. Yeovil had been promoted from non-League football as champions of the 2002–03 Football Conference.

Brentford's top scorer during the regular season was Donaldson with 22 goals (18 in the league and 4 in the FA Cup) followed by Forrester who had scored 11 (8 in the league and 3 in the FA Cup). The leading scorers for Yeovil were Madden on 22 (all in the league) and James Hayter with 14 (also all in the league). Yeovil had won both matches between the clubs during the regular season: a 3–1 victory at Griffin Park in August 2012 was followed by a 3–0 win at Huish Park the following February.

The referee for the match was Andy D'Urso, who was assisted by Derek Eaton and Alan Young. The fourth official was Graham Scott and the reserve assistant referee was John Hopkins.

=== Summary ===
The match kicked off around 1:30 p.m. at Wembley Stadium in front of a crowd of 41,955. In the fifth minute, Madden's shot from inside the Brentford penalty area was blocked. A minute later, he took control of the ball on the edge of the box and struck it with the outside of his right boot into the top-right corner of Moore's goal. It was his 23rd goal of the season, but the first for six games, and was described by Jacob Steinberg in The Guardian as a goal which "would have graced any previous Wembley final". The remainder of the first half saw few chances, but in the 42nd minute, a corner from Sam Foley to the far post found Dan Burn who headed the ball into the six-yard box. Hayter and Moore both missed it and the ball crossed the goal-line to make it 2–0 to Yeovil. In injury time, Jake Bidwell's cross was headed goalwards by Marcello Trotta but it was caught by Štěch in the Yeovil goal.

Neither side made any changes to their personnel during half-time and in the opening moments of the second half, Brentford went on the attack with an off-target shot from Donaldson. Six minutes into the half, Brentford's Harlee Dean scored with a header from Forrester's corner, narrowing the margin to 2–1. In the 62nd minute, Bradley Wright-Phillips came on for Trotta in the first substitution of the game. Two minutes later, Donaldson's header was cleared off the line and Wright-Phillips failed to convert the rebound. In the 68th minute, Brentford made their second substitution when Sam Saunders replaced Forrester. A shot from Adam Forshaw was then saved by Štěch. On 75 minutes, Dawson appeared to be fouled in the Brentford penalty area but was booked for diving. Two minutes later Vitālijs Maksimenko came on to replace Jamie McAllister for Yeovil, and then Toumani Diagouraga for Hayes. In the 82nd minute, Wright-Phillips spun and struck a volley, but Štěch made the save. With two minutes of regular time remaining Matt Dolan replaced Hayter. Shay Logan then struck a shot just wide of the Yeovil goalpost. Despite late pressure from Brentford, the score remained 2–1 and Yeovil were promoted to the Championship.

=== Details ===
19 May 2013
13:30 BST

| Brentford | 1–2 | Yeovil Town |
|---|---|---|
| Dean 51' | Report | Madden 6'; Burn 42' |

Wembley Stadium, London
Attendance: 41,955
Referee: Andy D'Urso

| Brentford | Yeovil Town |

| GK | 21 | Simon Moore |
| DF | 14 | Shay Logan |
| DF | 5 | Tony Craig |
| DF | 6 | Harlee Dean |
| DF | 24 | Jake Bidwell |
| MF | 4 | Adam Forshaw |
| MF | 12 | Tom Adeyemi |
| MF | 20 | Toumani Diagouraga | (substituted off) 82' |
| MF | 19 | Harry Forrester | (substituted off) 67' |
| FW | 9 | Clayton Donaldson |
| FW | 11 | Marcello Trotta | (substituted off) 62' |
Substitutes:
| GK | 16 | Antoine Gounet |
| DF | 18 | Lee Hodson |
| MF | 2 | Kevin O'Connor |
| MF | 7 | Sam Saunders | (substituted in) 67' |
| MF | 8 | Jonathan Douglas |
| FW | 17 | Bradley Wright-Phillips | (substituted in) 62' |
| FW | 23 | Paul Hayes | (substituted in) 82' |
Manager:
Uwe Rösler

| GK | 1 | Marek Štěch |
| DF | 2 | Luke Ayling |
| DF | 5 | Byron Webster |
| DF | 18 | Dan Burn |
| DF | 3 | Jamie McAllister | | (substituted off) 77' |
| MF | 22 | Kevin Dawson | (yellow card) 75' |
| MF | 8 | Ed Upson | (yellow card) 70' |
| MF | 14 | Sam Foley |
| MF | 20 | Joe Edwards |
| FW | 9 | James Hayter | | (substituted off) 88' |
| FW | 17 | Paddy Madden |
Substitutes:
| GK | 12 | Gareth Stewart |
| DF | 4 | Richard Hinds |
| DF | 13 | Vitālijs Maksimenko | | (substituted in) 77' |
| MF | 10 | Gavin Williams | (yellow card) 90' |
| MF | 26 | Matthew Dolan | | (substituted in) 88' |
| FW | 15 | Lewis Young |
| FW | 29 | Ángelo Balanta |
Manager:
Gary Johnson

Assistant referees:
Derek Eaton
Alan Young
Fourth official:
Graham Scott
Reserve Assistant Referee:
John Hopkins

Match rules:

- 90 minutes.
- 30 minutes of extra time if necessary.
- Penalty shoot-out if scores still level.
- Seven named substitutes.
- Maximum of three substitutions.

== Post-match ==
The Yeovil manager Gary Johnson described Madden's opening goal as "a sublime piece of ingenuity". Speaking of the play-offs, he described his team as having "three great games" which had "brought the club together, even more so than if we had gone up automatically." His counterpart Uwe Rösler was reflective: "This club has not been at this level for decades ... this squad has lifted the club to a higher level."

Ten years after being promoted from non-League football, Yeovil were promoted to the second tier of English football. Yeovil Town ended their following season bottom of the Football League Championship, and were relegated back to League One. Brentford finished second in League One in their next season, and gained automatic promotion to the Championship for the 2014–15 season.
