= Gareth Stewart =

English footballer (born 1980)

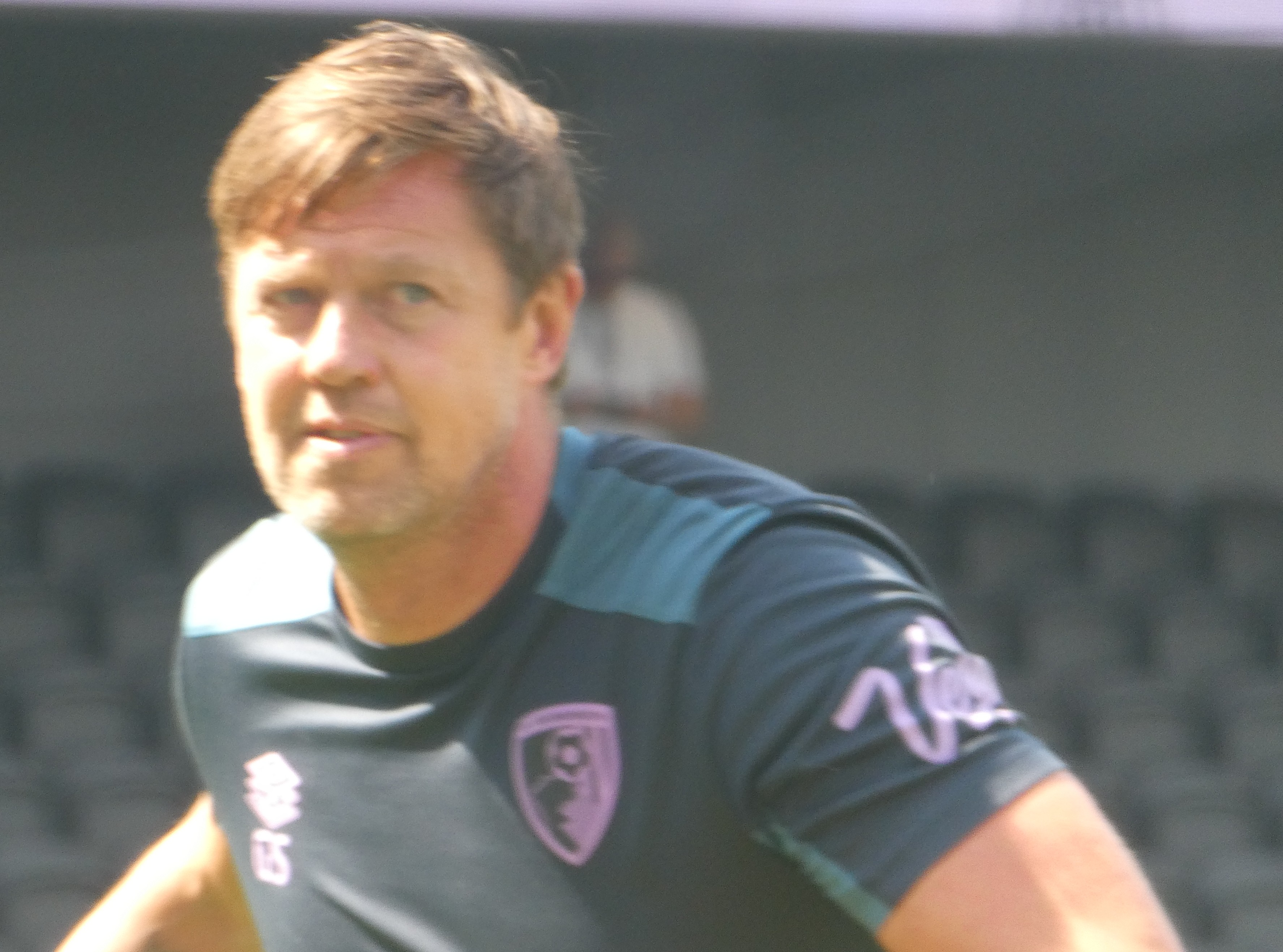
- Gareth Stewart in 2026

Personal information
- Full name: Gareth John Stewart
- Date of birth: 3 February 1980 (age 46)
- Place of birth: Preston, England
- Height: 6 ft 0 in (1.83 m)
- Position: Goalkeeper

Team information
- Current team: Blackburn Rovers (First Team Goalkeeper Coach)

Senior career*
Years	Team	Apps	(Gls)
1997–1999	Blackburn Rovers	0	(0)
1999–2008	AFC Bournemouth	163	(0)
2008–2009	Dorchester Town	41	(0)
2010–2011	Welling United	11	(0)
2011–2015	Yeovil Town	3	(0)
2017	Weymouth	2	(0)
Total		220	(0)

Managerial career
- 2011–2015: Yeovil Town (goalkeeper coach)
- 2017–2026: AFC Bournemouth (goalkeeper coach)
- 2026–: Blackburn Rovers (goalkeeper coach)
- * Club domestic league appearances and goals

Gareth John Stewart (born 3 February 1980) is an English former professional footballer who is first-team goalkeeping coach for Blackburn Rovers.

Stewart started his professional career with Blackburn Rovers in 1997 representing England various times at a young age, but left for AFC Bournemouth in 1999 having never made an appearance for Blackburn. He established himself as Bournemouth's number one goalkeeper during the 2000–01 season, only to be dislodged during the 2002–03 season.

Gareth Stewart played less regularly in the next two seasons, and was released by Bournemouth in 2008, having made 179 appearances for the club. He then switched to Conference South side Dorchester Town, making 47 appearances before briefly leaving competitive football. He joined Conference South side Welling United in 2010, and made 12 appearances before joining Yeovil Town as a player/goalkeeping coach.

Stewart was later appointed assistant first-team goalkeeping coach alongside Neil Moss. In the role, he works within Bournemouth's goalkeeping department as part of the club's wider football staff structure.

== Career ==
Stewart was born in Preston, Lancashire. After beginning his career with Blackburn Rovers, he moved to AFC Bournemouth in 1999. He played regularly until 2002–03 season. Since 2005, he has made a number more first team appearances. During the 2007–08 season he made a total of 21 appearances in all competitions, though he was released at the end of the season.

Stewart signed a one-year contract with Conference South side Dorchester Town in August 2008. He has also joined the AFC Bournemouth Community Sports Trust as a community coach for school children in the local area.

On 30 September 2010, Stewart joined Conference South side Welling United.

On 14 January 2011, Stewart joined League One side Yeovil Town as a player-goalkeeping coach. After Yeovil's on loan goalkeeper Marek Štěch was called up to the Czech Republic national under-21 football team in November 2011, Stewart made his Yeovil debut in the FA Cup against Hereford United. He kept a clean sheet, as Yeovil won 3–0. Stewart made a further three appearances for Yeovil that season. Stewart's next appearance came as a substitute for Štěch after just eight minutes, in Yeovil's first home league game in the Championship in August 2013 against Birmingham City. His next and final appearance for Yeovil came as a substitute for Artur Krysiak, on 28 February 2015, against Scunthorpe United, and saved former Yeovil striker Paddy Madden's penalty. Stewart left Yeovil after more than three years after the club's relegation to League Two at the end of the 2014–15 season, due to financial cutbacks.

Following his release from Yeovil, Stewart returned to Bournemouth to work with the club's academy and under-23s.

In August 2017, Stewart joined Southern League Premier Division side Weymouth on non-contract terms.

== Career statistics ==
Appearances and goals by club, season and competition
Club	Season	League			FA Cup		League Cup		Other		Total	
Club	Season	Division	Apps	Goals	Apps	Goals	Apps	Goals	Apps	Goals	Apps	Goals
AFC Bournemouth	1999–00	Second Division	3	0	0	0	0	0	0	0	3	0
AFC Bournemouth	2000–01	Second Division	35	0	3	0	0	0	0	0	38	0
AFC Bournemouth	2001–02	Second Division	45	0	2	0	1	0	0	0	48	0
AFC Bournemouth	2002–03	Third Division	1	0	2	0	0	0	0	0	3	0
AFC Bournemouth	2003–04	Second Division	0	0	0	0	0	0	1 (Note: Appearance(s) in Football League Trophy)	0	1	0
AFC Bournemouth	2004–05	League One	0	0	0	0	0	0	1	0	1	0
AFC Bournemouth	2005–06	League One	42	0	1	0	2	0	0	0	45	0
AFC Bournemouth	2006–07	League One	19	0	0	0	0	0	0	0	19	0
AFC Bournemouth	2007–08	League One	18	0	2	0	0	0	1	0	21	0
AFC Bournemouth	Total		163	0	10	0	3	0	3	0	179	0
Dorchester Town	2008–09	Conference South	41	0	6	0	—		0	0	47	0
Welling United	2010–11	Conference South	11	0	1	0	—		0	0	12	0
Yeovil Town	2010–11	League One	0	0	0	0	0	0	0	0	0	0
Yeovil Town	2011–12	League One	1	0	3	0	0	0	0	0	4	0
Yeovil Town	2012–13	League One	0	0	0	0	0	0	0	0	0	0
Yeovil Town	2013–14	Championship	1	0	0	0	0	0	—		1	0
Yeovil Town	2014–15	League One	1	0	0	0	0	0	0	0	1	0
Yeovil Town	Total		3	0	3	0	0	0	0	0	6	0
Weymouth	2017–18	SL Premier Division	2	0	0	0	—		0	0	2	0
Career total			220	0	20	0	3	0	3	0	243	0

== Honours ==
Bournemouth

- Football League Third Division play-offs: 2003

Yeovil Town

- Football League One play-offs: 2013
