= Marek Štěch =

Czech association football player

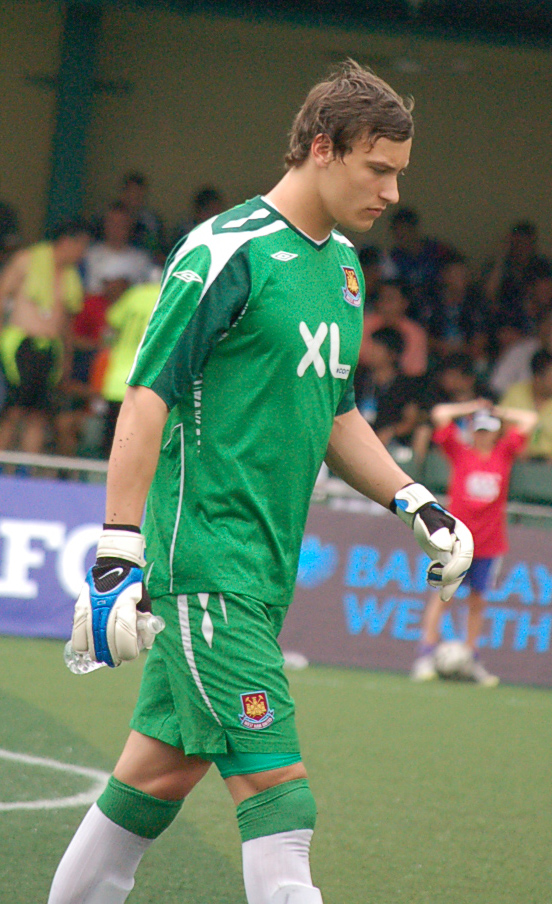
- Štěch with West Ham United in 2008

Personal information
- Full name: Marek Štěch
- Date of birth: 28 January 1990 (age 36)
- Place of birth: Prague, Czechoslovakia
- Height: 6 ft 3 in (1.91 m)
- Position: Goalkeeper

Team information
- Current team: Ligmet Milín
- Number: 31

Youth career
- 2002–2006: Sparta Prague
- 2006–2008: West Ham United

Senior career*
Years	Team	Apps	(Gls)
2008–2012	West Ham United	0	(0)
2009	→ Wycombe Wanderers (loan)	2	(0)
2009	→ AFC Bournemouth (loan)	1	(0)
2011	→ Yeovil Town (loan)	5	(0)
2012	→ Leyton Orient (loan)	2	(0)
2012–2014	Yeovil Town	72	(0)
2014–2017	Sparta Prague	19	(0)
2017–2020	Luton Town	43	(0)
2020–2022	Mansfield Town	24	(0)
2023–	Ligmet Milín	30	(0)

International career
2006–2007	Czech Republic U17	18	(0)
2009–2012	Czech Republic U21	12	(0)
2014	Czech Republic	1	(0)
Medal record
Men's football
Representing Czech Republic
UEFA European Under-17 Championship
Runner-up	2006 Luxembourg
- * Club domestic league appearances and goals as of 21:39, 22 June 2024 (UTC)

Marek Štěch (born 28 January 1990) is a Czech professional footballer who last played as a goalkeeper for EFL League One club Mansfield Town. He began his career with local club Sparta Prague, spending four years in their youth system.

In 2006, aged 16, Štěch signed for Premier League club West Ham United for an undisclosed fee. Štěch had loan spells with Wycombe Wanderers and AFC Bournemouth in 2009, but made only three appearances in total. He made his first-team debut for West Ham in the League Cup in August 2010 before spending more time out on loan in League One with Yeovil Town and Leyton Orient in 2011–12. After six years with the club, Štěch left West Ham by mutual consent to join Yeovil Town permanently, and helped them win promotion to the Championship in 2012–13. He turned down a new contract with Yeovil, and re-signed for Sparta Prague in 2014. Štěch has represented the Czech Republic at under-17 and under-21 levels and has been capped once by the Czech Republic national team.

== Club career ==
=== Early career ===
Born in Prague, Czechoslovakia, Štěch began his career with local club Sparta Prague, where he became a trainee in July 2005.

=== West Ham United ===
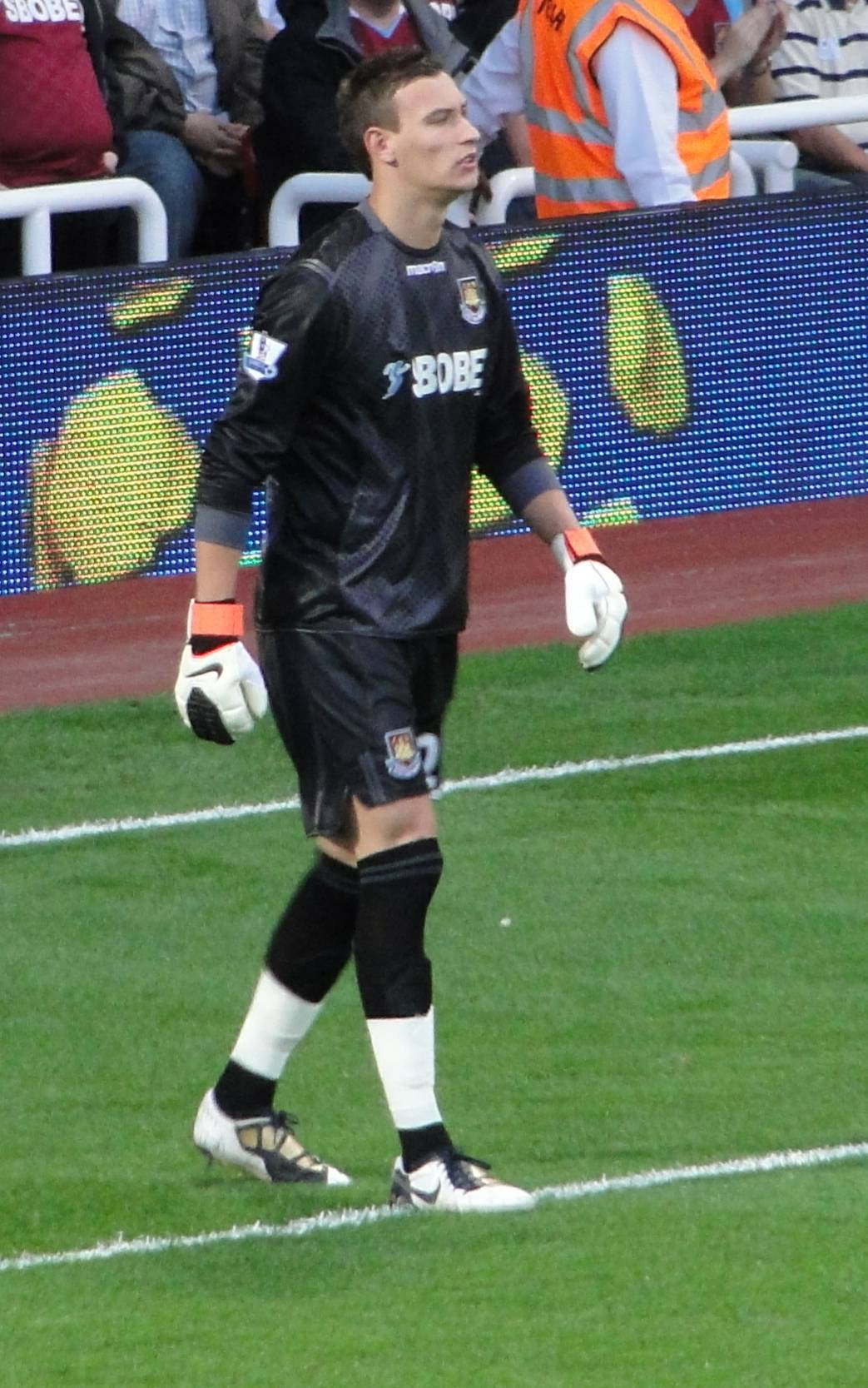
Štěch playing for West Ham United in 2010

On 31 August 2006, Štěch signed for Premier League club West Ham United for an undisclosed fee. Due to an ankle injury, his debut was delayed until 17 November 2006, for the West Ham under-18 team in the Premier Academy League, which ended in a goalless draw against Chelsea. Štěch subsequently made his reserve-team debut in the 1–1 home draw against Portsmouth at the Boleyn Ground on 20 November 2006.

In July 2008, Štěch signed a new five-year contract with West Ham and was involved in the club's first-team pre-season programme. On 18 January 2009, he was named as first-team substitute goalkeeper for the first time for West Ham's visit to Newcastle United. On 12 March 2009, Štěch signed for League Two club Wycombe Wanderers on loan until the end of the season. Štěch made his Football League debut for Wycombe on 14 March 2009 in a 3–3 away draw against Brentford. However, a groin and hip injury sustained in training limited him to just two appearances for Wycombe, before returning to West Ham for treatment.

At the beginning of 2009–10, Štěch was handed the number 34 shirt. However, before making any appearances for the senior team, that number was taken by Olly Lee in a League Cup match against Millwall. On 11 December 2009, Štěch signed for League Two club AFC Bournemouth on an emergency loan due to last for seven days after Bournemouth after receiving special dispensation from the Football League. The following day, Štěch made his debut for Bournemouth but let in five goals as they lost 5–0 away to Morecambe. Štěch's loan with Bournemouth lasted only one match, and he returned to West Ham, where he was named as substitute goalkeeper in West Ham's next match, a 1–1 home draw with Chelsea. During the season, Štěch was named as substitute goalkeeper for West Ham on 14 occasions in all competitions, including 13 times in the Premier League and once in the FA Cup.

On 24 August 2010, Štěch made his debut for the West Ham first-team, against Oxford United in the League Cup, keeping a clean sheet in a 1–0 victory. He made a total of three appearances in the League Cup for West Ham and was an unused substitute on 13 occasions in the Premier League.

In October 2011, Štěch signed on loan for League One club Yeovil Town following an injury to Yeovil's first choice goalkeeper Jed Steer. He made his debut on 15 October 2011, in a 3–0 home defeat by Carlisle United. On 14 November 2011, he was recalled from his loan five days early by West Ham. He made five appearances for Yeovil, keeping one clean sheet and saving a penalty in a 0–0 draw with Stevenage on 22 October 2011. On 24 February 2012, Štěch signed on a month-long loan for League One club Leyton Orient. Štěch made his Leyton Orient debut the following day in a 1–1 draw against Bury, but he only managed two matches before suffering an ankle injury. At the end of 2011–12, West Ham confirmed that Štěch had left the club by mutual consent after six years in east London.

=== Yeovil Town ===
On 5 July 2012, following his departure from West Ham, Štěch signed permanently for League One club Yeovil Town on a two-year contract, becoming the club's first permanent goalkeeper on the books since 2008–09. Štěch made his first appearance of the season and permanent debut for Yeovil in a League Cup tie at home to Colchester United on 14 August 2012. Štěch was ever-present for Yeovil in 2012–13, playing 56 matches and keeping 19 clean sheets, and was man of the match in the 2013 League One play-off final as Yeovil won promotion to the Championship for the first time in their history.

After being substituted for Gareth Stewart in a 1–0 home defeat against Birmingham City, it was confirmed Štêch would be out for 3–4 months with a fractured hand. After four months out, Štěch made his return from injury in a 1–0 loss against Blackburn Rovers.

At the end of 2013–14, which resulted in Yeovil Town's relegation, Štěch was offered a new contract with the club.

=== Sparta Prague ===
Štěch rejected Yeovil's offer and moved back to Czech club Sparta Prague, the club he represented as a child, to replace outgoing Sparta goalkeeper Tomáš Vaclík.

=== Luton Town ===
On 14 June 2017, Štěch signed for League Two club Luton Town on a two-year contract upon the expiry of his contract with Sparta Prague. He made his debut on 5 August 2017, starting Luton's 8–2 win at home to former club Yeovil Town on the opening day of 2017–18, in which he saved a penalty from Otis Khan. Štěch kept his first clean sheet for Luton in a 3–0 victory at home to Colchester United on 19 August. He signed a one-year extension to his contract in June 2018.

Having not featured during the 2019–20 campaign, Štěch was released at the end of his contract.

=== Mansfield Town ===
Following his release by Luton, Štěch signed for Mansfield Town on a two-year contract. At the end of the 2020–21 season, Štěch was transfer-listed by Mansfield Town.

=== Milín ===
In summer 2023, Štěch joined TJ Ligmet Milín.

== International career ==
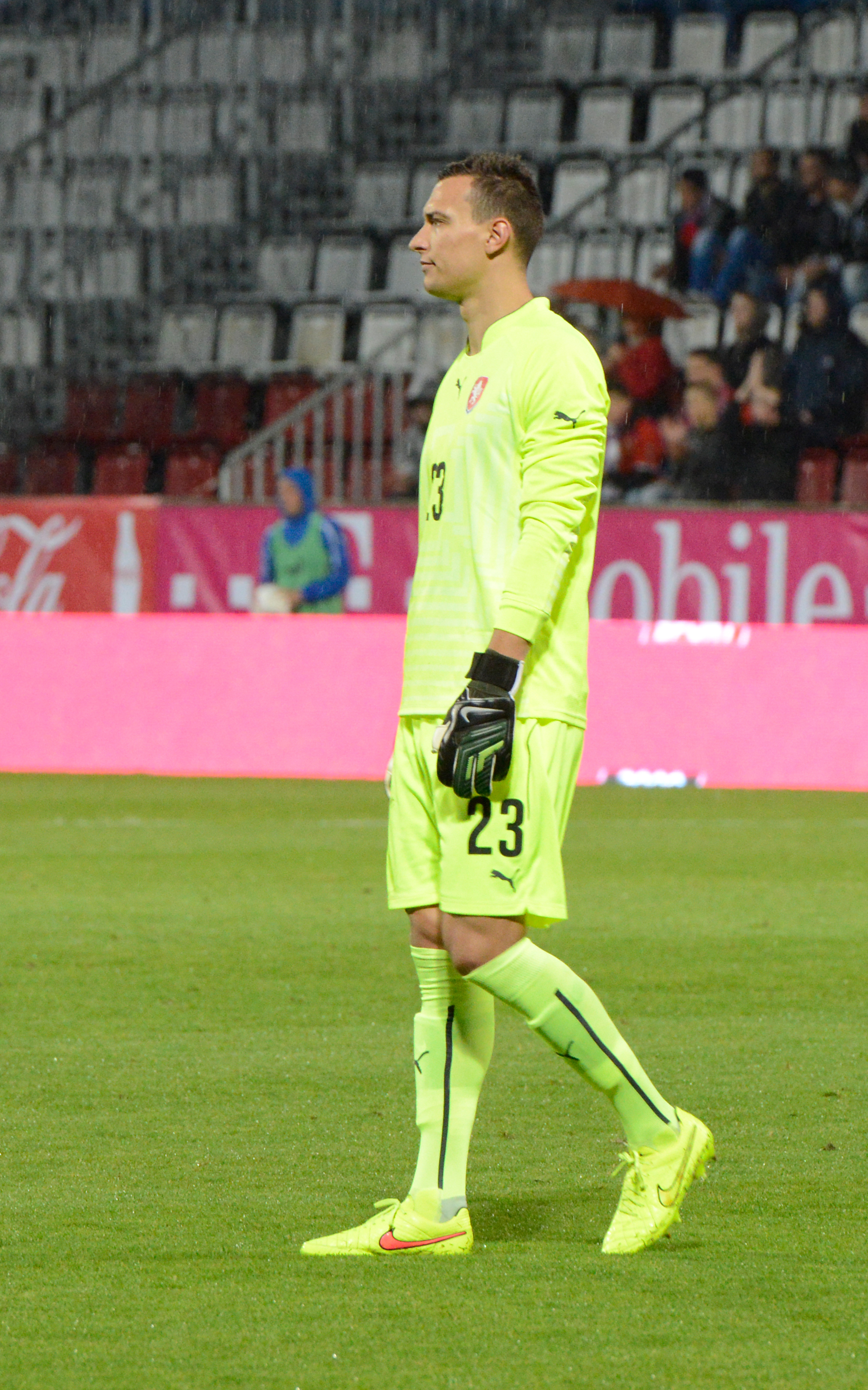
Štěch playing for the Czech Republic in 2014

Štěch made under-17 debut in a 1–0 win against Finland in February 2006, and played in the 2006 UEFA European Under-17 Championship as the Czech Republic finished the competition as runners-up to Russia.

On 13 May 2014, Štěch received his first call-up to the Czech Republic national team for their friendlies against Finland and Austria on 21 May 2014 and 5 June 2014. Despite being an unused substitute against Finland, Štěch debuted as a starter against Austria.

== Controversy ==
On 13 April 2013, Štěch posted two offensive tweets on his Twitter account. One of the tweets called Sparta's rival club Slavia Prague "Fucking jews". Štěch later deleted the two tweets and apologised.

== Career statistics ==
=== Club ===
As of match played 13 March 2021

Appearances and goals by club, season and competition
Club	Season	League			National Cup		League Cup		Other		Total	
Club	Season	Division	Apps	Goals	Apps	Goals	Apps	Goals	Apps	Goals	Apps	Goals
West Ham United	2008–09	Premier League	0	0	0	0	0	0	—		0	0
West Ham United	2009–10	Premier League	0	0	0	0	0	0	—		0	0
West Ham United	2010–11	Premier League	0	0	0	0	3	0	—		3	0
West Ham United	2011–12	Championship	0	0	0	0	0	0	—		0	0
West Ham United	Total		0	0	0	0	3	0	—		3	0
Wycombe Wanderers (loan)	2008–09	League Two	2	0	—		—		—		2	0
AFC Bournemouth (loan)	2009–10	League Two	1	0	—		—		—		1	0
Yeovil Town (loan)	2011–12	League One	5	0	—		—		—		5	0
Leyton Orient (loan)	2011–12	League One	2	0	—		—		—		2	0
Yeovil Town	2012–13	League One	46	0	1	0	2	0	7 (Note: Four appearances in Football League Trophy, three in League One play-offs)	0	56	0
Yeovil Town	2013–14	Championship	26	0	2	0	1	0	—		29	0
Yeovil Town	Total		72	0	3	0	3	0	7	0	85	0
Sparta Prague	2014–15	Czech First League	17	0	3	0	—		3 (Note: One appearance in UEFA Champions League, two in UEFA Europa League)	0	23	0
Sparta Prague	2015–16	Czech First League	2	0	3	0	—		1 (Note: Appearance in UEFA Europa League)	0	6	0
Sparta Prague	2016–17	Czech First League	0	0	0	0	—		0	0	0	0
Sparta Prague	Total		19	0	6	0	—		4	0	29	0
Luton Town	2017–18	League Two	38	0	3	0	1	0	0	0	42	0
Luton Town	2018–19	League One	5	0	0	0	0	0	2 (Note: Appearance(s) in EFL Trophy)	0	7	0
Luton Town	2019–20	Championship	0	0	0	0	0	0	—		0	0
Luton Town	Total		43	0	3	0	1	0	2	0	49	0
Mansfield Town	2020–21	League Two	24	0	3	0	1	0	1	0	29	0
Mansfield Town	2021–22	League Two	0	0	0	0	0	0	0	0	0	0
Mansfield Town	Total		24	0	3	0	1	0	1	0	29	0
Career total			168	0	15	0	8	0	14	0	205	0

=== International ===
As of match played 3 June 2014

Appearances and goals by national team and year
National team	Year	Apps	Goals
Czech Republic	2014	1	0
Total		1	0

== Honours ==
Yeovil Town

- Football League One play-offs: 2013

Sparta Prague

- Czech Supercup: 2014

Luton Town

- EFL League Two runner-up: 2017–18

Czech Republic U17

- European Under-17 Championship runner-up: 2006

Individual

- PFA Team of the Year: 2017–18 League Two
