= Corey Jordan =

English footballer

Personal information
- Full name: Corey Jordan
- Date of birth: 4 March 1999 (age 27)
- Place of birth: Bournemouth, England
- Position: Defender

Team information
- Current team: Poole Town
- Number: 18

Youth career
- 2006–2016: AFC Bournemouth

Senior career*
Years	Team	Apps	(Gls)
2016–2021	AFC Bournemouth	0	(0)
2019	→ Eastbourne Borough (loan)	11	(1)
2020–2021	→ Weymouth (loan)	11	(0)
2021	Gloucester City	1	(0)
2021–2023	Aldershot Town	62	(3)
2023–2024	Gosport Borough	36	(2)
2024–2025	Weymouth	27	(0)
- * Club domestic league appearances and goals as of 17:46, 6 March 2025 (UTC)

Corey Jordan (born 4 March 1999), is an English professional footballer who plays as a defender for club Poole Town.

== Club career ==
Born in Bournemouth, Dorset, Jordan started his career with local side AFC Bournemouth at the age of seven in the youth team, progressing to the first team to sign his first professional contract in March 2016. In September 2016, he made his professional debut in a 3–2 loss to Preston North End in the EFL Cup, replacing Tyrone Mings as a substitute. In February 2019, Jordan joined Eastbourne Borough on loan in the National League South. In preparation of the 2019–20 season, Jordan went on trial with Southend United before being recalled back by Bournemouth. Then in October 2019, he joined Weymouth in the National League on a short term loan. Following the expiration of his contract, in May 2021 Jordan was released by Bournemouth.

In September 2021, Jordan signed a one-year deal with National League North side Gloucester City. On 19 October 2021 however, Jordan joined National League club Aldershot Town, just one month into his one year deal.

On 16 July 2023, following his departure from Aldershot, Jordan agreed to join Gosport Borough, reuniting with former manager, Mark Molesley.

In June 2024, Jordan returned to Weymouth on a permanent basis, once again reuniting with Mark Molesley.

In May 2025, Corey departed Weymouth and signed for Poole Town FC where he wears the number 18 shirt.

== Career statistics ==
As of match played 25 March 2023

Appearances and goals by club, season and competition
Club	Season	League			FA Cup		EFL Cup		Other		Total	
Club	Season	Division	Apps	Goals	Apps	Goals	Apps	Goals	Apps	Goals	Apps	Goals
AFC Bournemouth	2015–16	Premier League	0	0	0	0	0	0	—		0	0
AFC Bournemouth	2016–17	Premier League	0	0	0	0	1	0	—		1	0
AFC Bournemouth	2017–18	Premier League	0	0	0	0	0	0	—		0	0
AFC Bournemouth	2018–19	Premier League	0	0	0	0	0	0	—		0	0
AFC Bournemouth	2019–20	Premier League	0	0	0	0	0	0	—		0	0
AFC Bournemouth	2020–21	Championship	0	0	0	0	0	0	—		0	0
AFC Bournemouth	Total		0	0	0	0	1	0	—		1	0
Eastbourne Borough (loan)	2018–19	National League South	11	1	0	0	—		0	0	11	1
Weymouth (loan)	2020–21	National League	11	0	1	0	—		1 (Note: Appearances in FA Trophy)	1	13	1
Gloucester City	2021–22	National League North	1	0	2	0	—		0	0	3	0
Aldershot Town	2021–22	National League	26	0	0	0	—		2	0	28	0
Aldershot Town	2022–23	National League	36	3	1	0	—		3	0	40	3
Aldershot Town	Total		62	3	1	0	—		5	0	68	3
Gosport Borough	2023–24	Southern League Premier Division South	36	2	0	0	—		0	0	0	0
Career total			79	3	3	0	1	0	3	1	86	4
