= Matt Butcher (footballer) =

English footballer (born 1997)

Personal information
- Full name: Matthew David Butcher
- Date of birth: 14 May 1997 (age 29)
- Place of birth: Portsmouth, England
- Height: 1.88 m (6 ft 2 in)
- Position: Midfielder

Team information
- Current team: Salford City
- Number: 18

Youth career
- 2010–2015: AFC Bournemouth

Senior career*
Years	Team	Apps	(Gls)
2015–2020	AFC Bournemouth	0	(0)
2015	→ Gosport Borough (loan)	1	(0)
2015	→ Poole Town (loan)	8	(0)
2016	→ Woking (loan)	10	(2)
2016–2017	→ Yeovil Town (loan)	34	(2)
2020	→ St Johnstone (loan)	6	(0)
2020–2022	Accrington Stanley	76	(6)
2022–2024	Plymouth Argyle	55	(3)
2024–2025	Wycombe Wanderers	31	(3)
2025	→ Bristol Rovers (loan)	18	(0)
2025–	Salford City	45	(5)
- * Club domestic league appearances and goals as of 26 October 2026

Matthew David Butcher (born 14 May 1997) is an English professional footballer who plays as a midfielder for EFL League Two club Salford City.

== Early life ==
Born in Portsmouth, Butcher grew up in Denmead and attended The Cowplain School in Waterlooville.

== Career ==
=== AFC Bournemouth ===
Having undergone trials with both Portsmouth and Southampton, Butcher joined AFC Bournemouth in 2010 aged thirteen, progressing through the under-18 and under-21 sides. On 1 April 2015, he and three other Bournemouth youth prospects (including Joe Quigley, Jordan Lee and Jack Simpson) were offered a one-year professional contract.

On 27 August 2015, Butcher made his Bournemouth debut featuring in a 4–0 victory over Hartlepool United in the League Cup, replacing Adam Smith in the 77th minute. On 9 January 2016, he went on to make his first Bournemouth start in a 2–1 victory over Birmingham City in the FA Cup, playing the full 90 minutes.

==== Non-league loan spells ====
On 5 February 2015, Butcher joined Conference South side Gosport Borough on a one-month loan on a work experience basis. 2 days later, he made his Gosport Borough debut in a 2–1 defeat against Hemel Hempstead Town, playing the full 90 minutes. On 7 March 2015, after only making one appearance for Gosport Borough, Butcher returned to Bournemouth.

On 26 March 2015, he joined non-league side Poole Town on loan for the remainder of the season. On 4 April 2015, Butcher made his Poole Town debut in a 1–0 defeat to Chippenham Town, playing the full 90 minutes. He went on to make seven more appearances before returning to Bournemouth.

On 26 February 2016, Butcher joined National League side Woking on a one-month loan deal. On 27 February 2016, he made his Woking debut in a 2–0 defeat to Grimsby Town in the FA Trophy, playing the full 90 minutes. On 26 March 2016, after impressing on loan at Woking, Butcher's loan spell was extended until the end of the season. On 2 April 2016, Butcher scored his first professional goal in a 2–2 draw with Southport, in which he got both goals.

==== Yeovil Town (loan) ====
On 5 August 2016, Butcher joined League Two side Yeovil Town on a six-month loan deal. The following day, Butcher made his Yeovil Town debut in a 2–0 home victory against Notts County, replacing Kevin Dawson with six minutes remaining. On 9 August 2016, Butcher was given his full Yeovil Town debut by manager Darren Way in a 2–0 away victory against Walsall in the EFL Cup first round. On 5 January 2017, Butcher and his fellow Bournemouth loanee Ben Whitfield's loans were extended until the end of the season.

==== St Johnstone (loan) ====
Butcher signed on for Scottish Premiership club St Johnstone on a six-month loan on 31 January 2020.

=== Accrington Stanley ===
On 24 August 2020, Butcher signed for Accrington Stanley on a two-year deal.

On 5 May 2022, Accrington Stanley announced Butcher would be leaving the club upon the expiration of his contract on 30 June 2022, with Stanley unable to agree improved terms with the player.

=== Plymouth Argyle ===
On 20 June 2022, Plymouth Argyle announced on their website that Butcher would join on a two-year contract.

On 31 January 2024, Butcher was released from his contract to allow him to pursue opportunities elsewhere.

=== Wycombe Wanderers ===
On 31 January 2024, Butcher signed for EFL League One side Wycombe Wanderers.

On 30 January 2025, Butcher joined fellow League One side Bristol Rovers on loan for the remainder of the season. On 2 February, he made his debut for the club, assisting the first goal in a 3–1 victory over Peterborough United.

=== Salford City ===
On 22 August 2025, Butcher joined League Two club Salford City on a two-year deal. He made his debut for the club on 23 August 2025, in a 1–0 defeat to Walsall. He scored his first goal for the club on 27 September 2025, in a 2–1 defeat to Bristol Rovers.

== Career statistics ==
As of 26 October 2026

Appearances and goals by club, season and competition
Club	Season	League			National cup		League cup		Other		Total	
Club	Season	Division	Apps	Goals	Apps	Goals	Apps	Goals	Apps	Goals	Apps	Goals
AFC Bournemouth	2014–15	Championship	0	0	0	0	0	0	—		0	0
AFC Bournemouth	2015–16	Premier League	0	0	1	0	1	0	—		2	0
AFC Bournemouth	2016–17	Premier League	0	0	0	0	0	0	—		0	0
AFC Bournemouth	2017–18	Premier League	0	0	0	0	0	0	—		0	0
AFC Bournemouth	2018–19	Premier League	0	0	0	0	0	0	—		0	0
AFC Bournemouth	2019–20	Premier League	0	0	0	0	0	0	—		0	0
AFC Bournemouth	Total		0	0	1	0	1	0	0	0	2	0
Gosport Borough (loan)	2014–15	Conference South	1	0	0	0	—		0	0	1	0
Poole Town (loan)	2014–15	Southern Premier	8	0	0	0	—		1 (Note: Appearance in Southern Premier Play-offs)	0	9	0
Woking (loan)	2015–16	National League	10	2	0	0	—		2 (Note: One appearance in FA Trophy, one appearance in Surrey Senior Cup)	0	12	2
Yeovil Town (loan)	2016–17	League Two	34	2	1	0	2	0	5 (Note: Appearances in EFL Trophy)	0	42	2
St Johnstone (loan)	2019–20	Scottish Premiership	6	0	1	0	0	0	—		7	0
Accrington Stanley	2020–21	League One	42	2	1	0	1	0	5	0	49	2
Accrington Stanley	2021–22	League One	34	4	0	0	2	0	0	0	36	4
Accrington Stanley	Total		76	6	1	0	3	0	5	0	85	6
Plymouth Argyle	2022–23	League One	40	3	1	0	1	0	6	0	48	3
Plymouth Argyle	2023–24	Championship	15	0	1	0	2	0	—		18	0
Plymouth Argyle	Total		55	3	2	0	3	0	6	0	66	3
Wycombe Wanderers	2023–24	League One	18	3	0	0	0	0	2	1	20	4
Wycombe Wanderers	2024–25	League One	13	0	3	0	3	0	4	0	23	0
Wycombe Wanderers	Total		31	3	3	0	3	0	6	1	43	4
Bristol Rovers (loan)	2024–25	League One	18	0	0	0	0	0	0	0	18	0
Salford City	2025–26	League Two	38	5	4	0	0	0	6 (Note: Three appearances in EFL Trophy, three appearances in EFL League Two play-offs)	0	48	5
Salford City	2026–27	League Two	7	0	0	0	1	0	2	0	10	0
Salford City	Total		45	5	4	0	1	0	8	0	58	5
Career total			284	21	13	0	13	0	33	1	343	22

== Honours ==
Plymouth Argyle

- EFL League One: 2022–23
- EFL Trophy runner-up: 2022–23

Wycombe Wanderers

- EFL Trophy runner-up: 2023–24

Individual

- AFC Bournemouth Young Player of the Season: 2013–14
