= Callum Wilson =

English footballer (born 1992)

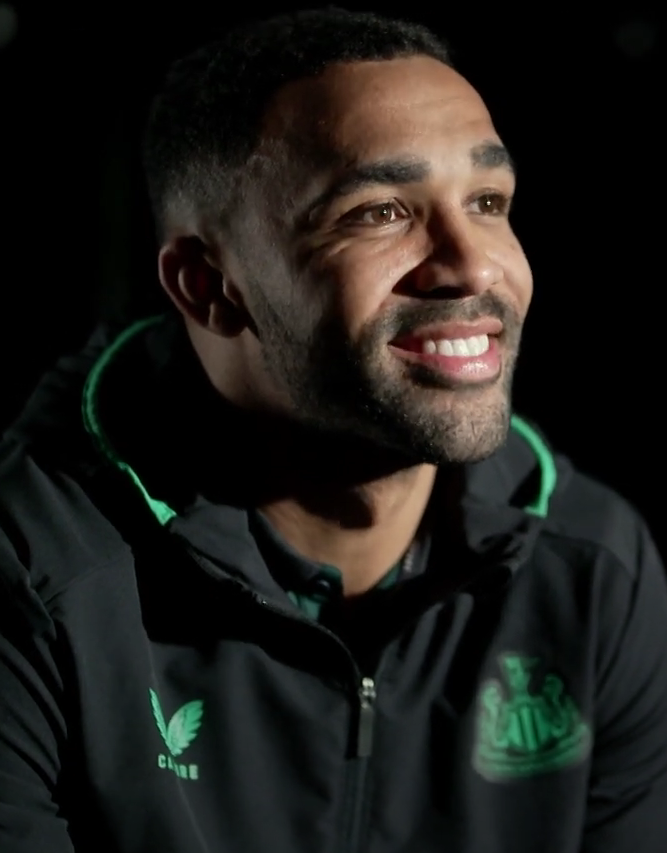
- Wilson with Newcastle United in 2023

Personal information
- Full name: Callum Eddie Graham Wilson
- Date of birth: 27 February 1992 (age 34)
- Place of birth: Coventry, England
- Height: 5 ft 11 in (1.80 m)
- Position: Striker

Team information
- Current team: Brentford
- Number: 13

Youth career
- –2009: Coventry City

Senior career*
Years	Team	Apps	(Gls)
2009–2014	Coventry City	49	(22)
2011	→ Kettering Town (loan)	17	(1)
2011–2012	→ Tamworth (loan)	3	(1)
2014–2020	Bournemouth	171	(61)
2020–2025	Newcastle United	113	(47)
2025–2026	West Ham United	32	(7)
2026–	Brentford	5	(0)

International career
2014	England U21	1	(0)
2018–2023	England	9	(2)
Medal record
Men's football
Representing England
UEFA Nations League
Third place	Portugal 2019
- * Club domestic league appearances and goals as of 02:07, 25 October 2026 (UTC)

Callum Eddie Graham Wilson (born 27 February 1992) is an English professional footballer who plays as a striker for Premier League club Brentford.

Wilson began his career with his hometown club Coventry City and he broke into the first team after loans to Conference Premier clubs Kettering and Tamworth. He signed for Bournemouth in 2014, winning the Championship in his first season and playing for five seasons in the Premier League. In 2020, he signed for Newcastle United, spending five years at the club before joining West Ham United.

A former youth international for England at under-21 level, Wilson made his senior debut for England in 2018. He was also a part of the squad for the 2022 FIFA World Cup.

== Early life ==
Callum Eddie Graham Wilson was born on 27 February 1992 in Coventry, West Midlands. He is of Irish and Jamaican descent. He attended President Kennedy School in the Keresley district of Coventry.

== Club career ==
=== Coventry City ===
Wilson made his first-team debut for Coventry City on 12 August 2009 as a substitute for Stephen Wright at half time in extra time of a 1–0 League Cup first round defeat at home to Hartlepool United. He signed a professional deal, which saw him stay at the club for a further season, on 16 March 2010. Wilson became the first Coventry City youth teamer to win the national award for apprentice of the month in March 2010. He made his league debut when he came on as a substitute against Queens Park Rangers in the Championship in December 2010.

Wilson joined Conference Premier club Kettering Town on an initial one-month loan at the turn of the year in 2011. His loan was extended to another three months upon completion of his first month. Wilson played 17 games, scoring once.

On 29 December 2011, Wilson was loaned to Conference Premier club Tamworth for a month. He made his debut for the club in a 2–2 draw at home to Alfreton Town on 1 January, where he played the full game. He scored in his second game for the club with a curling shot in a 2–1 defeat against Wrexham on 14 January. Wilson suffered a fractured foot in his third appearance for the Lambs which saw his short loan spell end.

Wilson scored his first goal for Coventry on 12 March 2013 as they came from behind to draw 2–2 at home to Colchester United. Nonetheless, he started only three league games before the start of the 2013–14 season. Before that campaign, a transfer embargo meant that manager Steven Pressley began pairing Wilson with Leon Clarke up front.

On 31 October 2013, Wilson signed a contract to the summer of 2015 with the option of one more season. He was League One Player of the Month for March 2014 with seven goals from as many games, after having missed nine games through injury. He finished the season as League One's third-top scorer with 22 goals and also earned himself a place in the League One PFA Team of the Year Wilson won his club's Top Goalscorer award, Player's Player award voted for by his teammates and the Player of the season award voted for by Coventry City fans.

=== Bournemouth ===
On 4 July 2014, Wilson signed for Bournemouth for an undisclosed fee, believed to be in the region of £3 million, after spending five years at Coventry. He scored twice on his debut for the club, in a 4–0 win against Huddersfield Town on 9 August.

In his first season at the club, Wilson helped them achieve promotion to the Premier League for the first time in the club's history, becoming the team's top scorer for that season in the process, scoring 20 league goals. He was Bournemouth's only player to score in all three domestic competitions, scoring the winning goal in a 2–1 victory against West Bromwich Albion in the fourth round of the League Cup.

On 22 August 2015, Wilson scored his first Premier League goals with a hat-trick against West Ham United. On 26 September 2015, he ruptured the anterior cruciate ligament (ACL) in his right knee in the match against Stoke City and was expected to be out for about six months. Wilson made his return on 9 April 2016 as an injury-time substitute in Bournemouth's 2–1 win away to Aston Villa.

In July 2016, despite having missed most of the preceding season, Wilson signed a new four-year contract amidst interest from Tottenham Hotspur and West Ham United. He ruptured the anterior cruciate ligament in his left knee on 1 February 2017 and was expected to be out for about six months. On 18 November 2017, not long after recovering, he scored a hat-trick in a 4–0 home win over Huddersfield. He signed a contract in July 2019 for four more years, after being tracked by West Ham and Chelsea.

=== Newcastle United ===
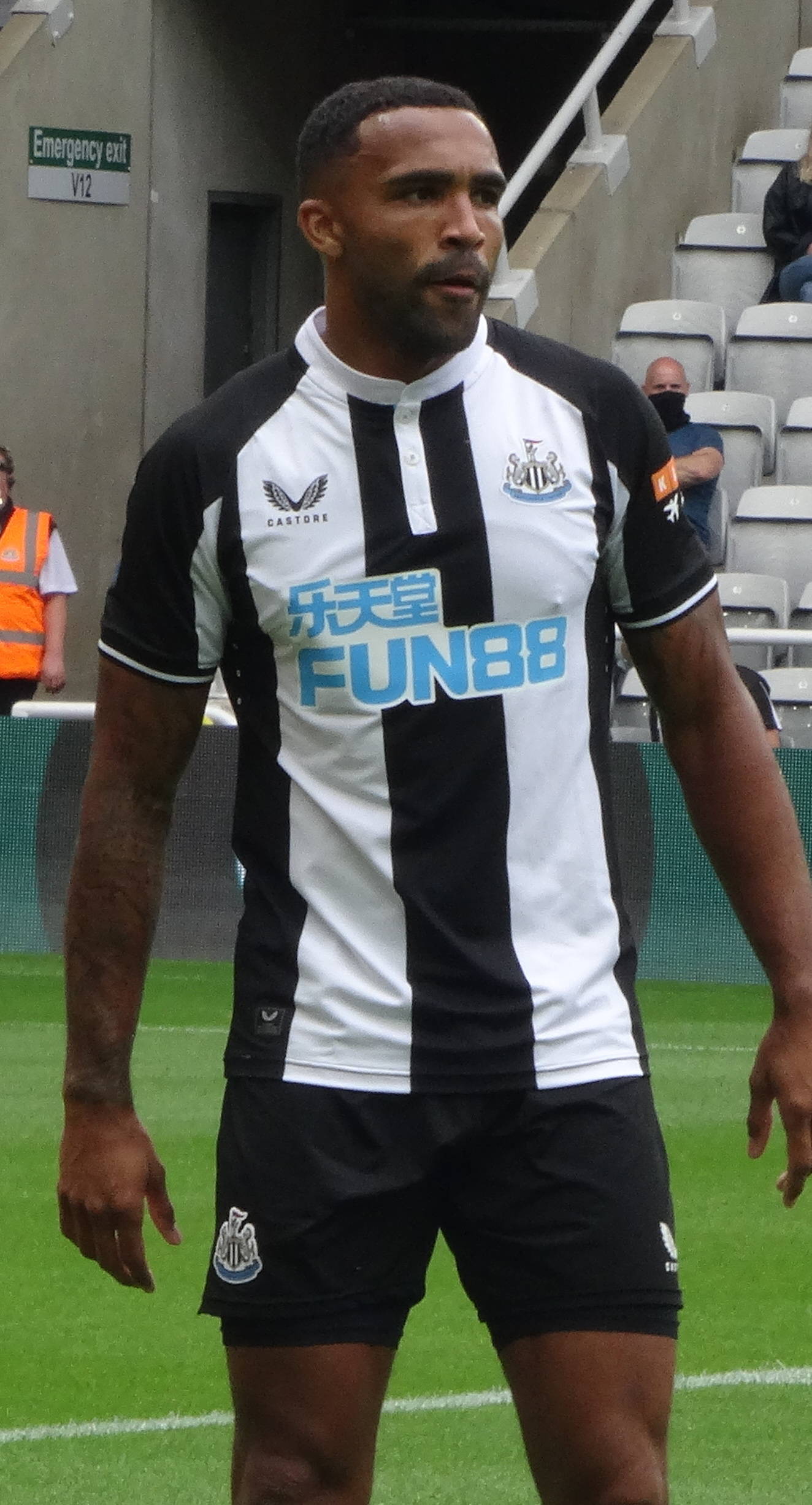
Wilson playing for Newcastle United in 2021

Wilson signed for Premier League club Newcastle United on 7 September 2020 on a four-year contract for an undisclosed fee, reported by BBC Sport to be around £20 million, making him the third-highest fee paid by Newcastle for a player. He made his debut on 12 September, scoring the first goal in a 2–0 away win against West Ham. On 30 January 2021, Wilson scored his 50th Premier League goal in a 2–0 victory over Everton.

Wilson was sidelined with a calf injury from December 2021 to the following May; by the time of his return, he was still the team's top scorer with six goals for the season. He finished the 2022–23 season as Newcastle's top scorer with 18 goals, and fifth overall in the Premier League. He then extended his contract to 2025.

On 7 July 2025, Wilson announced that he would leave Newcastle after five seasons with the club.

=== West Ham United ===
In August 2025, Wilson joined West Ham United as a free agent, signing a one-year contract. On 31 August, Wilson scored his first goal for the club, in a 3–0 away victory against Nottingham Forest.

=== Brentford ===
On 9 July 2026, Wilson joined Brentford on a free transfer, signing a one-year contract. On 25 August, Wilson scored his first goal for the club, in a 6–1 away victory against Birmingham City in the 2nd round of the Lеаgue Cup.

== International career ==
Wilson was called up to the England national under-21 team for the first time in November 2014 for friendly matches against Portugal and France. He made his only appearance on 17 November in the match against France, as a 65th-minute substitute in a 3–2 away defeat.

Wilson was called up to the England senior team for the first time in November 2018 for a friendly match against the United States and a UEFA Nations League match against Croatia. He made his debut on 15 November when starting against the United States at Wembley Stadium, and scored in the 77th minute of a 3–0 win with a near-post finish. In doing so, he became the first Bournemouth player to score for England.

After a three-year absence, he was named in England's 26-man squad for the 2022 FIFA World Cup. Wilson came on as a 76th minute substitute in England's opening match against Iran, assisting Jack Grealish for England's sixth goal in a 6–2 victory.

== Personal life ==
Wilson has a wife, Stacey, and two children.

== Career statistics ==
=== Club ===
As of match played 28 October 2026

Appearances and goals by club, season and competition
Club	Season	League			FA Cup		League Cup		Europe		Other		Total	
Club	Season	Division	Apps	Goals	Apps	Goals	Apps	Goals	Apps	Goals	Apps	Goals	Apps	Goals
Coventry City	2009–10	Championship	0	0	0	0	1	0	—		—		1	0
Coventry City	2010–11	Championship	1	0	0	0	0	0	—		—		1	0
Coventry City	2011–12	Championship	0	0	—		0	0	—		—		0	0
Coventry City	2012–13	League One	11	1	0	0	0	0	—		1 (Note: Appearance in Football League Trophy)	0	12	1
Coventry City	2013–14	League One	37	21	2	1	1	0	—		1	0	41	22
Coventry City	Total		49	22	2	1	2	0	—		2	0	55	23
Kettering Town (loan)	2010–11	Conference Premier	17	1	—		—		—		—		17	1
Tamworth (loan)	2011–12	Conference Premier	3	1	0	0	—		—		—		3	1
Bournemouth	2014–15	Championship	45	20	1	1	4	2	—		—		50	23
Bournemouth	2015–16	Premier League	13	5	0	0	0	0	—		—		13	5
Bournemouth	2016–17	Premier League	20	6	1	0	0	0	—		—		21	6
Bournemouth	2017–18	Premier League	28	8	1	0	2	1	—		—		31	9
Bournemouth	2018–19	Premier League	30	14	0	0	3	1	—		—		33	15
Bournemouth	2019–20	Premier League	35	8	2	1	2	0	—		—		39	9
Bournemouth	Total		171	61	5	2	11	4	—		—		187	67
Newcastle United	2020–21	Premier League	26	12	0	0	2	0	—		—		28	12
Newcastle United	2021–22	Premier League	18	8	0	0	0	0	—		—		18	8
Newcastle United	2022–23	Premier League	31	18	0	0	5	0	—		—		36	18
Newcastle United	2023–24	Premier League	20	9	0	0	2	1	4 (Note: Appearances in UEFA Champions League)	0	—		26	10
Newcastle United	2024–25	Premier League	18	0	2	1	2	0	—		—		22	1
Newcastle United	Total		113	47	2	1	11	1	4	0	—		130	49
West Ham United	2025–26	Premier League	32	7	2	0	1	0	—		—		35	7
Brentford	2026–27	Premier League	5	0	0	0	3	3	—		—		8	3
Career total			390	139	11	4	28	8	4	0	2	0	435	151

=== International ===
Appearances and goals by national team and year
National team	Year	Apps	Goals
England	2018	1	1
England	2019	3	0
England	2022	2	0
England	2023	3	1
Total		9	2

England score listed first, score column indicates score after each Wilson goal

List of international goals scored by Callum Wilson
No.	Date	Venue	Cap	Opponent	Score	Result	Competition	Ref.
1	15 November 2018	Wembley Stadium, London, England	1	United States	3–0	3–0	Friendly	
2	16 June 2023	National Stadium, Ta' Qali, Malta	7	Malta	4–0	4–0	UEFA Euro 2024 qualifying	

== Honours ==
Bournemouth

- Football League Championship: 2014–15

Newcastle United

- EFL Cup: 2024–25; runner-up: 2022–23

England

- UEFA Nations League third place: 2018–19

Individual

- PFA Team of the Year: 2013–14 League One
- Football League Championship Player of the Month: October 2014
- Coventry City Player of the Year: 2013–14
- Newcastle United Player of the Year: 2020–21
