= 2016–17 AFC Bournemouth season =

AFC Bournemouth
2016–17 season
- Owner: Maxim Demin
- Chairman: Jeff Mostyn
- Manager: Eddie Howe
- Stadium: Dean Court
- Premier League: 9th
- FA Cup: Third round (eliminated by Millwall)
- League Cup: Third round (eliminated by Preston North End)
- Top goalscorer: League: Joshua King (16); All: Joshua King (16)
- Highest home attendance: 11,388 v Burnley; 13 May 2017
- Average home league attendance: 11,182
Home colours	Away colours	Third colours

The 2016–17 season was AFC Bournemouth's second consecutive season in the Premier League and their 127th year in existence. That season Bournemouth participated in the Premier League, FA Cup and Football League Cup.

The season covers the period from 1 July 2016 to 30 June 2017.

== First-team squad ==
As of 27 August 2016

Note: Flags indicate national team as defined under FIFA eligibility rules; some limited exceptions apply. Players may hold more than one non-FIFA nationality.

No.	Pos.	Nation	Player
1	GK	POL	Artur Boruc
2	DF	ENG	Simon Francis (captain)
3	DF	ENG	Steve Cook
4	MF	ENG	Dan Gosling
6	MF	ENG	Andrew Surman
7	MF	ENG	Marc Pugh
8	MF	IRL	Harry Arter
9	FW	COD	Benik Afobe
10	FW	CIV	Max Gradel
11	DF	ENG	Charlie Daniels
13	FW	ENG	Callum Wilson
14	DF	AUS	Brad Smith
15	DF	ENG	Adam Smith
17	MF	NOR	Joshua King

No.	Pos.	Nation	Player
18	MF	ENG	Lewis Cook
19	MF	ENG	Junior Stanislas
20	DF	IRL	Marc Wilson
21	GK	ENG	Ryan Allsop
22	MF	USA	Emerson Hyndman
23	GK	AUS	Adam Federici
24	MF	SCO	Ryan Fraser
26	DF	ENG	Tyrone Mings
28	FW	JAM	Lewis Grabban
29	DF	WAL	Rhoys Wiggins
31	FW	FRA	Lys Mousset
32	MF	ENG	Jack Wilshere (on loan from Arsenal)
33	MF	ENG	Jordon Ibe
38	DF	ENG	Baily Cargill

=== Out on loan ===
Note: Flags indicate national team as defined under FIFA eligibility rules; some limited exceptions apply. Players may hold more than one non-FIFA nationality.

No.	Pos.	Nation	Player
27	FW	ENG	Glenn Murray (on loan to Brighton & Hove Albion)
34	MF	ENG	Harry Cornick (on loan to Leyton Orient)
36	MF	ENG	Matt Butcher (on loan to Yeovil Town)

No.	Pos.	Nation	Player
40	FW	ENG	Ben Whitfield (on loan to Yeovil Town)
46	FW	ENG	Jordan Green (on loan to Newport County)
—	FW	ENG	Joe Quigley (on loan to Gillingham)

== Statistics ==
=== Appearances and goals ===
As of 21 May 2017

No.	Pos	Nat	Player	Total		Premier League		FA Cup		League Cup	
No.	Pos	Nat	Player	Apps	Goals	Apps	Goals	Apps	Goals	Apps	Goals
1	GK	(Poland) POL	Artur Boruc	35	0	35	0	0	0	0	0
2	DF	(England) ENG	Simon Francis	35	0	34	0	0	0	1	0
3	DF	(England) ENG	Steve Cook	39	2	38	2	0+1	0	0	0
4	MF	(England) ENG	Dan Gosling	30	3	14+13	2	0+1	0	2	1
5	DF	(Netherlands) NED	Nathan Aké	12	3	8+2	3	0	0	2	0
6	MF	(England) ENG	Andrew Surman	23	0	21+1	0	1	0	0	0
7	MF	(England) ENG	Marc Pugh	23	2	16+5	2	1	0	1	0
8	MF	(Republic of Ireland) IRL	Harry Arter	35	1	33+2	1	0	0	0	0
9	FW	(England) ENG	Benik Afobe	33	6	14+17	6	0	0	2	0
10	MF	(Ivory Coast) CIV	Max Gradel	13	1	0+11	0	0	0	2	1
11	DF	(England) ENG	Charlie Daniels	34	4	34	4	0	0	0	0
13	FW	(England) ENG	Callum Wilson	21	6	16+4	6	0+1	0	0	0
14	DF	(Australia) AUS	Brad Smith	8	0	3+2	0	1	0	2	0
15	DF	(England) ENG	Adam Smith	36	1	34+2	1	0	0	0	0
17	FW	(Norway) NOR	Joshua King	36	16	31+5	16	0	0	0	0
18	MF	(England) ENG	Lewis Cook	8	0	4+2	0	0	0	2	0
19	MF	(England) ENG	Junior Stanislas	22	7	18+3	7	0	0	1	0
20	DF	(Republic of Ireland) IRL	Marc Wilson	3	1	0	0	1	0	2	1
21	GK	(England) ENG	Ryan Allsop	1	0	1	0	0	0	0	0
22	MF	(United States) USA	Emerson Hyndman	3	0	0	0	1	0	0+2	0
23	GK	(Australia) AUS	Adam Federici	5	0	2	0	1	0	2	0
24	MF	(Scotland) SCO	Ryan Fraser	29	3	19+9	3	0	0	1	0
26	DF	(England) ENG	Tyrone Mings	9	0	5+2	0	1	0	1	0
28	FW	(England) ENG	Lewis Grabban	6	1	0+3	0	1	0	2	1
31	FW	(France) FRA	Lys Mousset	14	0	3+8	0	1	0	0+2	0
32	MF	(England) ENG	Jack Wilshere	27	0	22+5	0	0	0	0	0
33	MF	(England) ENG	Jordon Ibe	26	0	13+12	0	1	0	0	0
38	DF	(England) ENG	Baily Cargill	1	0	0+1	0	0	0	0	0
37	DF	(England) ENG	Corey Jordan	1	0	0	0	0	0	0+1	0
47	DF	(England) ENG	Jordan Lee	1	0	0	0	1	0	0	0
58	MF	(England) ENG	Matt Worthington	1	0	0+1	0	0	0	0	0

== Transfers ==
=== In ===
Date from	Position	Nationality	Name	From	Fee	Ref.
1 July 2016	CM	USA	Emerson Hyndman	Fulham	Free transfer	
1 July 2016	CF	FRA	Lys Mousset	Le Havre	Undisclosed	
6 July 2016	GK	IRL	Mark Travers	Cherry Orchard	Free transfer	
6 July 2016	CF	ENG	Mikael Ndjoli	Millwall	Free transfer	
8 July 2016	CM	ENG	Lewis Cook	Leeds United	£7,000,000	
14 July 2016	RW	ENG	Jordon Ibe	Liverpool	£15,000,000	
27 July 2016	LB	AUS	Brad Smith	Liverpool	£3,000,000	
15 August 2016	CB	IRL	Marc Wilson	Stoke City	£2,000,000	
31 January 2017	GK	ENG	Aaron Ramsdale	Sheffield United	Undisclosed	

=== Out ===
Date from	Position	Nationality	Name	To	Fee	Ref.
1 July 2016	CM	SCO	Josh Carmichael	Free agent	Released	
1 July 2016	CB	FRA	Sylvain Distin	Free agent	Released	
1 July 2016	CB	ENG	Tommy Elphick	Aston Villa	£3,000,000	
1 July 2016	CB	BDI	Jon Muleba	Free agent	Released	
1 July 2016	RM	SCO	Matt Ritchie	Newcastle United	£12,000,000	
1 July 2016	CF	ENG	Jayden Stockley	Aberdeen	Free transfer	
1 July 2016	LW	ENG	Mason Walsh	Free agent	Released	
1 July 2016	CM	ENG	Josh Wakefield	Free agent	Released	
1 July 2016	CB	GPE	Stéphane Zubar	Free agent	Released	
5 July 2016	SS	ENG	Lee Tomlin	Bristol City	£3,000,000	
13 August 2016	CM	WAL	Shaun MacDonald	Wigan Athletic	Undisclosed	
26 August 2016	CF	RSA	Tokelo Rantie	Gençlerbirliği	Undisclosed	
31 August 2016	CM	IRL	Eunan O'Kane	Leeds United	Undisclosed	
13 January 2017	CF	ENG	Brandon Goodship	Yeovil Town	Free transfer	
31 January 2017	CF	ENG	Glenn Murray	Brighton & Hove Albion	Undisclosed	

Total incoming: £18,000,000

=== Loans in ===
Date from	Position	Nationality	Name	From	Date until	Ref.
1 July 2016	LB	NED	Nathan Aké	Chelsea	8 January 2017 (Note: On 8 January 2017, Ake's loan spell was terminated.)	
31 August 2016	CM	ENG	Jack Wilshere	Arsenal	End of season	

=== Loans out ===
Date from	Position	Nationality	Name	To	Date until	Ref.
3 July 2016	CF	ENG	Glenn Murray	Brighton & Hove Albion	31 January 2017	(Note: On 31 January 2017, Glenn Murray's loan was made permanent.)
7 July 2016	CF	ENG	Joe Quigley	Gillingham	31 January 2017	
26 July 2016	RW	ENG	Harry Cornick	Leyton Orient	14 January 2017	
5 August 2016	DM	ENG	Matt Butcher	Yeovil Town	End of Season	(Note: On 5 January 2017, Matt Butcher's loan at Yeovil Town was extended until the end of the season.)
8 August 2016	ST	ENG	Jordan Green	Newport County	9 January 2017	
25 August 2016	CM	ENG	Ben Whitfield	Yeovil Town	End of Season	(Note: On 5 January 2017, Ben Whitfield's loan at Yeovil Town was extended until the end of the season.)
31 August 2016	CB	ENG	Baily Cargill	Gillingham	3 January 2017	
31 August 2016	LB	WAL	Rhoys Wiggins	Birmingham City	2 January 2017	
9 January 2017	CM	USA	Emerson Hyndman	Rangers	End of Season	
13 January 2017	RB	ENG	Jordan Lee	Torquay United	End of Season	
19 January 2017	LB	ENG	Callum Buckley	Aldershot Town	End of Season	
31 January 2017	RW	ENG	Harry Cornick	Gillingham	End of Season	
31 January 2017	CF	JAM	Lewis Grabban	Reading	End of Season	
31 January 2017	RW	ENG	Jordan Green	Leyton Orient	End of Season	
31 January 2017	CB	ENG	Jake McCarthy	Maidstone United	End of Season	
31 January 2017	CF	ENG	Joe Quigley	Gillingham	End of Season	
31 January 2017	CB	IRL	Marc Wilson	West Bromwich Albion	End of Season	

== Pre-season friendlies ==
On 27 May 2016, it was announced that Bournemouth would travel to the Madejski Stadium on 29 July 2016 to play Reading. On 3 June 2016, it was announced that Bournemouth would play League Two side Portsmouth on 23 July 2016 and that they would also host a fixture against Cardiff City. On 14 June 2016, a friendly against Spanish side Valencia was announced. On 29 June 2016, it was announced that Bournemouth would once again visit the United States for a pre-season tour with a fixture against Minnesota United on 20 July 2016.

20 July 2016 Friendly	Minnesota United	0–4	Bournemouth	Blaine, United States
19:00 UTC−5		Report	C. Wilson 24', 39'; Ndjock 26' (o.g.); Grabban 86'	Stadium: National Sports Center; Attendance: 8,334

23 July 2016 Friendly	Portsmouth	3–3	Bournemouth	Portsmouth
15:00 BST	Roberts 4'; Smith 26'; May 88'	Report	Grabban 24'; Ibe 70'; Gosling 79'	Stadium: Fratton Park; Attendance: 5,153 (531 away fans)

29 July 2016 Friendly	Reading	1–1	Bournemouth	Reading
20:00 BST	Swift 50'	Report	L. Cook 37'	Stadium: Madejski Stadium; Attendance: 6,660 (552 away fans)

30 July 2016 Friendly	Bournemouth	1–0	Cardiff City	Bournemouth
19:45 BST	Ibe 11'	Report		Stadium: Dean Court; Attendance: 4,036; Referee: Andy Davies

3 August 2016 Friendly	Bournemouth	1–1	Valencia	Bournemouth
19:45 BST	Afobe 63'	Report	Pérez 39'	Stadium: Dean Court; Attendance: 8,107; Referee: Brendan Malone (England)

7 August 2016 Friendly	Angers	0–1	Bournemouth	Angers, France
15:00 BST		Report	Pugh 2'	Stadium: Stade Jean-Bouin

== Competitions ==
=== Overview ===
Competition	Record							
Competition	Pld	W	D	L	GF	GA	GD	Win %
Premier League	38	12	10	16	55	67	−12	31.58
FA Cup	1	0	0	1	0	3	−3	0.00
EFL Cup	2	1	0	1	4	4	+0	50.00
Total	41	13	10	18	54	70	−16	31.71

Source: Competitions

=== Premier League ===
==== League table ====
Pos	Team	Pld	W	D	L	GF	GA	GD	Pts	Qualification or relegation
7	Everton	38	17	10	11	62	44	+18	61	Qualification for the Europa League third qualifying round (Note: Manchester United, winners of the 2016–17 EFL Cup, initially attained a spot in the Europa League third qualifying round. That was passed to the next-highest ranked team in the league not already qualified for UEFA competitions (7th-placed Everton).)
8	Southampton	38	12	10	16	41	48	−7	46	
9	Bournemouth	38	12	10	16	55	67	−12	46	
10	West Bromwich Albion	38	12	9	17	43	51	−8	45	
11	West Ham United	38	12	9	17	47	64	−17	45	

Source: Premier League
Rules for classification: 1) Points; 2) Goal difference; 3) Goals scored; 4) Play-offs (only if needed to decide champion, teams for relegation or teams for UEFA competitions).

==== Results summary ====
Overall								Home						Away					
Pld	W	D	L	GF	GA	GD	Pts	W	D	L	GF	GA	GD	W	D	L	GF	GA	GD
38	12	10	16	55	67	−12	46	9	4	6	35	29	+6	3	6	10	20	38	−18

Last updated: 21 May 2017.
Source: Premier League

==== Results by matchday ====
Matchday	1	2	3	4	5	6	7	8	9	10	11	12	13	14	15	16	17	18	19	20	21	22	23	24	25	26	27	28	29	30	31	32	33	34	35	36	37	38
Ground	H	A	A	H	A	H	A	H	H	A	H	A	A	H	A	H	H	A	A	H	A	H	H	A	H	A	A	H	H	A	A	H	A	H	A	H	H	A
Result	L	L	D	W	L	W	D	W	D	L	L	W	L	W	L	W	L	L	W	D	L	D	L	L	L	L	D	W	W	D	D	L	L	W	W	D	W	D
Position	20	20	19	13	16	13	12	9	10	10	12	9	12	10	11	8	10	13	10	9	11	11	14	14	14	14	14	14	11	11	13	15	16	12	10	10	10	9

Updated to match(es) played on 21 May 2017. Source: Statto.com
A = Away; H = Home; W = Win; D = Draw; L = Loss

==== Results ====
On 15 June 2016, the fixtures for the forthcoming season were announced.

14 August 2016 1	Bournemouth	1–3	Manchester United	Bournemouth
13:30 BST	A. Smith 69'	Report	Mata 40'; Rooney 59'; Ibrahimović 64'; Herrera (yellow card) 86'	Stadium: Dean Court; Attendance: 11,355; Referee: Andre Marriner

21 August 2016 2	West Ham United	1–0	Bournemouth	Stratford, London
16:00 BST	Byram (yellow card) 38'; Reid (yellow card) 45+2'; Antonio 85'	Report	Arter (yellow card) 33' (yellow-red card) 77'; S. Cook (yellow card) 37'	Stadium: Olympic Stadium; Attendance: 56,977; Referee: Craig Pawson

27 August 2016 3	Crystal Palace	1–1	Bournemouth	Selhurst, London
15:00 BST	Cabaye (yellow card) 16', (penalty missed) 16'; Delaney (yellow card) 45'; C. Benteke (yellow card) 73'; Dann 90+3'	Report	King 11'; Boruc (yellow card) 56'	Stadium: Selhurst Park; Attendance: 23,503; Referee: Mike Dean

10 September 2016 4	Bournemouth	1–0	West Bromwich Albion	Bournemouth
15:00 BST	A. Smith (yellow card) 71'; C. Wilson 79'	Report	Yacob (yellow card) 53'; Evans (yellow card) 89'; Field (yellow card) 90'	Stadium: Dean Court; Attendance: 11,184; Referee: Kevin Friend

17 September 2016 5	Manchester City	4–0	Bournemouth	Manchester
15:00 BST	De Bruyne 15'; Otamendi (yellow card) 24'; Iheanacho 25'; Sterling 48'; Gündoğan 66'; Nolito (red card) 86'	Report	A. Smith (yellow card) 86'	Stadium: City of Manchester Stadium; Attendance: 54,335; Referee: Jon Moss

24 September 2016 6	Bournemouth	1–0	Everton	Bournemouth
15:00 BST	Stanislas 23'; Daniels (yellow card) 42'; Surman (yellow card) 84'	Report	Gueye (yellow card) 34'; Oviedo (yellow card) 57'	Stadium: Dean Court; Attendance: 11,291; Referee: Robert Madley

1 October 2016 7	Watford	2–2	Bournemouth	Watford
15:00 BST	Prödl (yellow card) 12'; Pereyra (yellow card) 28'; Deeney 50'; Behrami (yellow card) 56'; Success 65'	Report	Wilshere (yellow card) 20'; C. Wilson 31'; A. Smith (yellow card) 41'; Francis (yellow card) 45'; King 62'; Stanislas (yellow card) 89'	Stadium: Vicarage Road; Attendance: 20,575; Referee: Mike Dean

15 October 2016 8	Bournemouth	6–1	Hull City	Bournemouth
15:00 BST	Daniels 5'; S. Cook 41'; Stanislas 45' (pen.), 65'; C. Wilson 83'; Gosling 88'	Report	Clucas (yellow card) 19'; Mason 34'; Snodgrass (yellow card) 44'; Robertson (yellow card) 59'	Stadium: Vitality Stadium; Attendance: 11,029; Referee: Lee Mason

22 October 2016 9	Bournemouth	0–0	Tottenham Hotspur	Bournemouth
12:30 BST	Gosling (yellow card) 39'; Gradel (yellow card) 67'	Report	Lamela (yellow card) 18'; Vertonghen (yellow card) 35'; Alli (yellow card) 37'; Rose (yellow card) 43'	Stadium: Dean Court; Attendance: 11,201; Referee: Craig Pawson

29 October 2016 10	Middlesbrough	2–0	Bournemouth	Middlesbrough
15:00 BST	Ramírez (yellow card) 24', (goal) 39'; Downing 56'; Chambers (yellow card) 90+2'	Report	A. Smith (yellow card) 25'	Stadium: Riverside Stadium; Attendance: 29,600; Referee: Stuart Attwell

5 November 2016 11	Bournemouth	1–2	Sunderland	Bournemouth
15:00 GMT	Arter (yellow card) 3'; Gosling 11'; King (yellow card) 30'; A. Smith (yellow card) 73'	Report	Anichebe 33', (yellow card) 70'; Pienaar (yellow card) 43' (yellow-red card) 59'; Defoe 74' (pen.); Gooch (yellow card) 90+5'	Stadium: Vitality Stadium; Attendance: 11,084; Referee: Mike Dean

19 November 2016 12	Stoke City	0–1	Bournemouth	Stoke-on-Trent
15:00 GMT	Allen (yellow card) 16'; Bony (yellow card) 22'; Adam (yellow card) 90+6'	Report	Aké 26'; Arter (yellow card) 34'; Gosling (yellow card) 44'; Federici (yellow card) 49'	Stadium: Bet365 Stadium; Attendance: 27,815; Referee: Roger East

27 November 2016 13	Arsenal	3–1	Bournemouth	Holloway, London
14:15 GMT	Sánchez 12', 90+1' (yellow card) 62'; Mustafi (yellow card) 22'; Walcott 53'; Gabriel (yellow card) 90+2'	Report	S. Cook (yellow card) 4'; Francis (yellow card) 7'; C. Wilson 23' (pen.); Arter (yellow card) 73'; B. Smith (yellow card) 80'; Gosling (yellow card) 88'	Stadium: Emirates Stadium; Attendance: 59,978; Referee: Mike Jones

4 December 2016 14	Bournemouth	4–3	Liverpool	Bournemouth
13:30 GMT	Wilshere (yellow card) 48'; Francis (yellow card) 50'; C. Wilson 56' (pen.); Fraser 76'; S. Cook 78'; Aké 90+3'	Report	Mané 20'; Origi 22'; Henderson (yellow card) 53'; Can 64' (yellow card) 87'	Stadium: Vitality Stadium; Attendance: 11,183; Referee: Robert Madley

10 December 2016 15	Burnley	3–2	Bournemouth	Burnley
15:00 GMT	Hendrick 13'; Ward 16'; Arfield (yellow card) 54'; Boyd (yellow card) 68' (goal) 75'	Report	Arter (yellow card) 34'; Afobe 45+1'; Gosling (yellow card) 60'; Daniels 90+1'	Stadium: Turf Moor; Attendance: 19,680; Referee: Martin Atkinson

13 December 2016 16	Bournemouth	1–0	Leicester City	Bournemouth
19:45 GMT	Pugh 34'	Report	King (yellow card) 36'; Morgan (yellow card) 83'; Hernández (yellow card) 87'	Stadium: Vitality Stadium; Attendance: 11,068; Referee: Paul Tierney

18 December 2016 17	Bournemouth	1–3	Southampton	Bournemouth
13:30 GMT	Aké 6'	Report	Bertrand 14'; Boufal (yellow card) 34'; Rodriguez 48', 65'; Clasie (yellow card) 76'; Davis (yellow card) 78'	Stadium: Dean Court; Attendance: 11,113; Referee: Mark Clattenburg

26 December 2016 18	Chelsea	3–0	Bournemouth	Fulham, London
15:00 GMT	Pedro 24' (yellow card) 63'; Hazard 49' (pen.); S. Cook 90+3' (o.g.)	Report	Wilshere (yellow card) 14'	Stadium: Stamford Bridge; Attendance: 41,384; Referee: Mike Jones

31 December 2016 19	Swansea City	0–3	Bournemouth	Swansea
15:00 GMT	Ki Sung-yueng (yellow card) 1'; Amat (yellow card) 34'	Report	Afobe 25'; Fraser 45+1'; King 88'	Stadium: Liberty Stadium; Attendance: 20,316; Referee: Kevin Friend

3 January 2017 20	Bournemouth	3–3	Arsenal	Bournemouth
19:45 GMT	Daniels 16'; C. Wilson 20' (pen.); S. Cook (yellow card) 44'; Fraser 58'; Francis (red card) 82'; Boruc (yellow card) 86'	Report	Bellerín (yellow card) 32'; Ramsey (yellow card) 45+3'; Sánchez 70'; Pérez 75'; Mustafi (yellow card) 80'; Giroud 90+2'	Stadium: Dean Court; Attendance: 11,202; Referee: Michael Oliver

14 January 2017 21	Hull City	3–1	Bournemouth	Hull
15:00 GMT	Hernández 32', 50'; Mings 62' (o.g.)	Report	Stanislas 3' (pen.); A. Smith (yellow card) 60'	Stadium: KCOM Stadium; Attendance: 17,963; Referee: Martin Atkinson

21 January 2017 22	Bournemouth	2–2	Watford	Bournemouth
15:00 GMT	King 48'; Afobe 82'; S. Cook (yellow card) 90+4'	Report	Kabasele 24'; Deeney 64'; Holebas (yellow card) 70'; Kaboul (yellow card) 79'	Stadium: Vitality Stadium; Attendance: 11,123; Referee: Lee Mason

31 January 2017 23	Bournemouth	0–2	Crystal Palace	Bournemouth
19:45 GMT		Report	Dann 46'; Ward (yellow card) 53'; Townsend (yellow card) 85'; Delaney (yellow card) 90'; Benteke 90+2' (yellow card) 90+3'	Stadium: Dean Court; Attendance: 11,286; Referee: Jonathan Moss

4 February 2017 24	Everton	6–3	Bournemouth	Liverpool
15:00 GMT	Lukaku 1', 29', 83', 85'; McCarthy 23'; Schneiderlin (yellow card) 49'; Robles (yellow card) 74'; Davies (yellow card) 76'; Barkley 90+4'	Report	Arter (yellow card) 14' (goal) 90'; King 59', 70'	Stadium: Goodison Park; Attendance: 39,026; Referee: Mike Jones

13 February 2017 25	Bournemouth	0–2	Manchester City	Bournemouth
20:00 GMT	Fraser (yellow card) 26'; Arter (yellow card) 68'	Report	Touré (yellow card) 10'; Sterling 29' (yellow card) 57'; Sané (yellow card) 64'; Mings 69' (o.g.)	Stadium: Vitality Stadium; Attendance: 11,129; Referee: Neil Swarbrick

25 February 2017 26	West Bromwich Albion	2–1	Bournemouth	West Bromwich
15:00 GMT	Dawson 10'; McAuley 21'; Nyom (yellow card) 49'; McClean (yellow card) 69'	Report	King 5' (pen.)	Stadium: The Hawthorns; Attendance: 24,162; Referee: Mark Clattenburg

4 March 2017 27	Manchester United	1–1	Bournemouth	Manchester
12:30 GMT	Rojo 23'; Ibrahimović (yellow card) 39', (penalty missed) 72'; Carrick (yellow card) 58'; Rashford (yellow card) 80'	Report	Arter (yellow card) 13'; Surman (yellow card) 33' (yellow-red card) 45'; King 40' (pen.); Gosling (yellow card) 71'	Stadium: Old Trafford; Attendance: 75,245; Referee: Kevin Friend

11 March 2017 28	Bournemouth	3–2	West Ham United	Bournemouth
15:00 GMT	King (penalty missed) 5' 31', 48', 90'; Pugh (yellow card) 66'; Afobe (penalty missed) 37' (yellow card) 72'; Gosling (yellow card) 80'; S. Cook (yellow card) 90+3'	Report	Noble (yellow card) 9'; Antonio 10'; Obiang (yellow card) 34'; Ayew 83'	Stadium: Dean Court; Attendance: 11,369; Referee: Robert Madley

18 March 2017 29	Bournemouth	2–0	Swansea City	Bournemouth
17:30 GMT	Mawson 31' (o.g.); Afobe 72'	Report	Ki Sung-yueng (yellow card) 40'; Cork (yellow card) 77'	Stadium: Dean Court; Attendance: 11,240; Referee: Mike Dean

1 April 2017 30	Southampton	0–0	Bournemouth	Southampton
17:30 BST	Romeu (yellow card) 90+2'	Report	Arter (penalty missed) 79'	Stadium: St Mary's Stadium; Attendance: 31,847; Referee: Jonathan Moss

5 April 2017 31	Liverpool	2–2	Bournemouth	Liverpool
20:00 BST	Lucas (yellow card) 29'; Coutinho 40'; Origi 59'	Report	Afobe 7'; King 87'; Fraser (yellow card) 90+1'	Stadium: Anfield; Attendance: 53,292; Referee: Lee Mason

8 April 2017 32	Bournemouth	1–3	Chelsea	Bournemouth
17:30 BST	Arter (yellow card) 38'; King 42'; Gradel (yellow card) 90+1'	Report	Moses (yellow card) 8'; A. Smith 17' (o.g.); Hazard 20'; Kanté (yellow card) 58'; Alonso 68'; Pedro (yellow card) 74'	Stadium: Dean Court; Attendance: 11,283; Referee: Andre Marriner

15 April 2017 33	Tottenham Hotspur	4–0	Bournemouth	London
12:30 BST	Dembélé 16'; Son Heung-min 19'; Kane 48'; Janssen 90+2'	Report	Fraser (yellow card) 70'	Stadium: White Hart Lane; Attendance: 31,943; Referee: Michael Oliver

22 April 2017 34	Bournemouth	4–0	Middlesbrough	Bournemouth
15:00 BST	King 2'; Afobe 16'; Pugh 65'; Daniels 70'	Report	Ramírez (yellow card) 14' (yellow-red card) 20'; Friend (yellow card) 58'; Ayala (yellow card) 67'	Stadium: Dean Court; Attendance: 10,890; Referee: Graham Scott

29 April 2017 35	Sunderland	0–1	Bournemouth	Sunderland
15:00 BST	Pienaar (yellow card) 46'; Borini (yellow card) 76'; Khazri (yellow card) 78'	Report	L. Cook (yellow card) 33'; Arter (yellow card) 76'; King 88'	Stadium: Stadium of Light; Attendance: 38,394; Referee: Stuart Attwell

6 May 2017 36	Bournemouth	2–2	Stoke City	Bournemouth
15:00 BST	Arter (yellow card) 26'; Stanislas 62'; Shawcross 81' (o.g.); Gradel (yellow card) 90'	Report	Mousset 33' (o.g.); Diouf 73'	Stadium: Dean Court; Attendance: 11,046; Referee: Paul Tierney

13 May 2017 37	Bournemouth	2–1	Burnley	Bournemouth
15:00 BST	Stanislas 25'; King 85'	Report	Vokes 83'; Brady (yellow card) 89'	Stadium: Dean Court; Attendance: 11,388; Referee: Lee Probert

21 May 2017 38	Leicester City	1–1	Bournemouth	Leicester
15:00 BST	Benalouane (yellow card) 45+1'; Vardy 51'; Simpson (yellow card) 57'; Mahrez (yellow card) 84'; Chilwell (yellow card) 90'	Report	Stanislas 1'; Francis (yellow card) 75'	Stadium: King Power Stadium; Attendance: 32,000; Referee: Lee Mason

=== FA Cup ===
7 January 2017 Third round	Millwall	3–0	Bournemouth	Bermondsey, London
15:00 GMT	Morison 26'; Cummings 49'; Thompson (yellow card) 61'; Ferguson 90+3'	Report	Surman (yellow card) 63'; C. Wilson (yellow card) 75'	Stadium: The Den; Attendance: 9,471; Referee: Andrew Madley

=== EFL Cup ===
24 August 2016 Second round	Morecambe	1–2	Bournemouth	Morecambe
19:45 BST	Stockton 14'	Report	Gradel 8'; M. Wilson 54'	Stadium: Globe Arena; Attendance: 2,542; Referee: Peter Bankes

20 September 2016 Third round	Bournemouth	2–3 (a.e.t.)	Preston North End	Bournemouth
19:45 BST	M. Wilson (yellow card) 15'; Grabban 53' (pen.); Gosling 76'	Report	Makienok 10', 85', 111'; Davies (yellow card) 30'; Pringle (yellow card) 58'; Pearson (yellow card) 109'	Stadium: Vitality Stadium; Attendance: 7,595; Referee: Simon Hooper
