= 2017–18 AFC Bournemouth season =

AFC Bournemouth
2017–18 season
- Owner: Maxim Demin
- Chairman: Jeff Mostyn
- Manager: Eddie Howe
- Stadium: Dean Court
- Premier League: 12th
- FA Cup: Third round
- EFL Cup: Fifth round
- Top goalscorer: League: Joshua King; Callum Wilson (8 each); All: Joshua King; Callum Wilson (9 each)
Home colours	Away colours	Third colours

The 2017–18 AFC Bournemouth season was the club's 3rd consecutive season in the top flight of English football and their 128th year in existence. This season Bournemouth participated in the Premier League, as well as the FA Cup and EFL Cup.

The season covered the period from 1 July 2017 to 30 June 2018.

== First-team squad ==
As of 31 January 2018

Note: Flags indicate national team as defined under FIFA eligibility rules; some limited exceptions apply. Players may hold more than one non-FIFA nationality.

No.	Pos.	Nation	Player
1	GK	POL	Artur Boruc
2	DF	ENG	Simon Francis (captain)
3	DF	ENG	Steve Cook
4	MF	ENG	Dan Gosling
5	DF	NED	Nathan Aké
6	MF	ENG	Andrew Surman (vice-captain)
7	MF	ENG	Marc Pugh
8	MF	IRL	Harry Arter
9	FW	COD	Benik Afobe
11	DF	ENG	Charlie Daniels
12	GK	ENG	Aaron Ramsdale
13	FW	ENG	Callum Wilson
14	DF	AUS	Brad Smith
15	DF	ENG	Adam Smith

No.	Pos.	Nation	Player
16	MF	ENG	Lewis Cook
17	MF	NOR	Joshua King
18	FW	ENG	Jermain Defoe
19	MF	ENG	Junior Stanislas
22	MF	USA	Emerson Hyndman
23	MF	ENG	Connor Mahoney
24	MF	SCO	Ryan Fraser
26	DF	ENG	Tyrone Mings
27	GK	BIH	Asmir Begović
29	DF	WAL	Rhoys Wiggins
31	FW	FRA	Lys Mousset
33	MF	ENG	Jordon Ibe
36	MF	ENG	Matt Butcher

== Transfers ==
=== Transfers in ===
Date from	Position	Nationality	Name	From	Fee	Ref.
1 July 2017	CB	NED	Nathan Aké	Chelsea	£20,000,000	
1 July 2017	GK	BIH	Asmir Begović	Chelsea	£10,000,000	
1 July 2017	CF	ENG	Jermain Defoe	Sunderland	Free	
1 July 2017	MF	ENG	Frankie Vincent	Barnet	Free	
4 July 2017	RM	ENG	Connor Mahoney	Blackburn Rovers	Compensation	

=== Transfers out ===
Date from	Position	Nationality	Name	To	Fee	Ref.
1 July 2017	LB	ENG	Callum Buckley	Weymouth	Released	(Note: Callum Buckley joined Weymouth following his release.)
1 July 2017	DF	ENG	Jake McCarthy	Weymouth	Released	(Note: Jake McCarthy joined Weymouth following his release.)
1 July 2017	MF	ENG	Matt Neale	Free agent	Released	
8 August 2017	RW	ENG	Harry Cornick	Luton Town	Undisclosed	
16 August 2017	RW	ENG	Jordan Green	Yeovil Town	Free	
31 August 2017	CB	IRL	Marc Wilson	Sunderland	Undisclosed	

=== Loans out ===
Start date	Position	Nationality	Name	To	End date	Ref.
7 July 2017	GK	IRL	Mark Travers	Weymouth	January 2018	
18 July 2017	GK	ENG	Ryan Allsop	Blackpool	30 June 2018	
24 July 2017	RB	ENG	Jordan Lee	Torquay United	January 2018	
26 July 2017	CF	ENG	Lewis Grabban	Sunderland	30 June 2018	
3 August 2017	FW	ENG	Sam Surridge	Yeovil Town	30 June 2018	
4 August 2017	CM	ENG	Ben Whitfield	Port Vale	January 2018	
8 August 2017	CM	ENG	Sam Matthews	Eastleigh	January 2018	
16 August 2017	LW	CIV	Max Gradel	Toulouse	30 June 2018	
17 August 2017	CB	ENG	Baily Cargill	Fleetwood Town	30 June 2018	
18 August 2017	CF	IRL	Joe Quigley	Newport County	January 2018	
30 August 2017	RM	ROU	Mihai Dobre	Bury	January 2018	
31 August 2017	GK	AUS	Adam Federici	Nottingham Forest	11 September 2017 (Note: On 11 September 2017, Adam Federici's loan at Nottingham Forest was mutually rescinded due to a knee injury.)	
31 August 2017	DF	ENG	Oliver Harfield	Poole Town	January 2018	
31 August 2017	MF	ENG	Matt Worthington	Yeovil Town	1 January 2018	

=== Overall transfer activity ===
==== Expenditure ====
Summer: ▼£30,000,000

Winter:

Total: ▼£30,000,000

==== Income ====
Summer:

Winter:

Total:

==== Net Totals ====
Summer: ▼£30,000,000

Winter:

Total: ▼£30,000,000

== Pre-season ==
Bournemouth announced six pre-season friendlies, against Queens Park Rangers, Yeovil Town, Portsmouth, Valencia, Estoril and Napoli.

15 July 2017	Estoril (Portugal)	1–2	(England) Bournemouth	Marbella, Spain
19:00 CEST	Eduardo 65'	Report	Ibe 54'; Gradel 71'	Stadium: Estadio Municipal de Marbella

22 July 2017	Portsmouth	1–2	Bournemouth	Milton
15:00 BST	Chaplin 52'	Report	Mousset 9' Afobe 54'	Stadium: Fratton Park

29 July 2017	Queens Park Rangers	0–1	Bournemouth	Shepherd's Bush
15:00		Report	Ibe 41'	Stadium: Loftus Road; Attendance: 9,386; Referee: Andy Davies

30 July 2017	Bournemouth (England)	0–1	(Spain) Valencia	Bournemouth
15:00 BST		Report	Orellana 72'	Stadium: Dean Court

2 August 2017	Yeovil Town	1–3	Bournemouth	Yeovil
19:45 BST	Davies 15'	Report	Mousset 29'; Afobe 35', 53'	Stadium: Huish Park; Attendance: 3,473; Referee: John Busby

6 August 2017	Bournemouth (England)	2–2	(Italy) Napoli	Bournemouth
19:30 BST	Afobe 52'; Francis 76'	Report	Mertens 30'; Zieliński 83'	Stadium: Dean Court; Referee: Stuart Attwell

== Competitions ==
=== Premier League ===
==== League table ====
Pos	Team	Pld	W	D	L	GF	GA	GD	Pts
10	Newcastle United	38	12	8	18	39	47	−8	44
11	Crystal Palace	38	11	11	16	45	55	−10	44
12	Bournemouth	38	11	11	16	45	61	−16	44
13	West Ham United	38	10	12	16	48	68	−20	42
14	Watford	38	11	8	19	44	64	−20	41

Source: Premier League
Rules for classification: 1) Points; 2) Goal difference; 3) Goals scored. 4) Play-offs (only if needed to decide champion, teams for relegation or teams for UEFA competitions).

==== Result summary ====
Overall								Home						Away					
Pld	W	D	L	GF	GA	GD	Pts	W	D	L	GF	GA	GD	W	D	L	GF	GA	GD
38	11	11	16	45	61	−16	44	7	5	7	26	30	−4	4	6	9	19	31	−12

Last updated: 18 April 2018.
Source: Premier League

==== Results by matchday ====
Matchday	1	2	3	4	5	6	7	8	9	10	11	12	13	14	15	16	17	18	19	20	21	22	23	24	25	26	27	28	29	30	31	32	33	34	35	36	37	38
Ground	A	H	H	A	H	A	H	A	A	H	A	H	A	H	H	A	A	H	A	H	H	A	H	A	A	H	A	H	A	H	H	A	H	A	H	A	H	A
Result	L	L	L	L	W	L	D	L	W	L	W	W	D	L	D	D	L	L	L	D	W	D	W	D	W	W	L	D	D	L	W	D	D	L	L	L	W	W
Position	15	17	18	19	19	19	19	19	19	19	16	13	13	15	14	14	14	16	18	18	14	16	13	12	10	9	10	11	12	13	10	10	11	11	11	12	12	12

Updated to match(es) played on 13 May 2018. Source: 11v11.com
A = Away; H = Home; W = Win; D = Draw; L = Loss

==== Matches ====
On 14 June 2017, AFC Bournemouth's 2017–18 Premier League fixtures was announced.

12 August 2017 1	West Bromwich Albion	1–0	Bournemouth	West Bromwich
15:00 BST	Hegazy 31'; Yacob (yellow card) 34'; Rodriguez (yellow card) 82'; Robson-Kanu (yellow card) 90+5'	Report	Arter (yellow card) 86'	Stadium: The Hawthorns; Attendance: 25,011; Referee: Bobby Madley

19 August 2017 2	Bournemouth	0–2	Watford	Boscombe
15:00 BST	S. Cook (yellow card) 61'	Report	Britos (yellow card) 27'; Gray (yellow card) 58'; Chalobah (yellow card) 63'; Richarlison 73'; Capoue 86'	Stadium: Vitality Stadium; Attendance: 10,501; Referee: Roger East

26 August 2017 3	Bournemouth	1–2	Manchester City	Boscombe
12:30 BST	Daniels 13'; Aké (yellow card) 23'; S. Cook (yellow card) 75'; Arter (yellow card) 85'; A. Smith (yellow card) 90+5'	Report	Gabriel Jesus 21'; Kompany (yellow card) 56'; D. Silva (yellow card) 56'; Otamendi (yellow card) 67'; Mendy (yellow card) 79'; Sterling (yellow card) 90+3' (yellow-red card) 90+9', (goal) 90+7'	Stadium: Vitality Stadium; Attendance: 10,419; Referee: Mike Dean

9 September 2017 4	Arsenal	3–0	Bournemouth	Holloway
15:00 BST	Welbeck 6', 50'; Lacazette 27'	Report	Francis (yellow card) 76'	Stadium: Emirates Stadium; Attendance: 59,262; Referee: Anthony Taylor

15 September 2017 5	Bournemouth	2–1	Brighton & Hove Albion	Boscombe
20:00 BST	Surman 67'; Defoe 73'	Report	March 55'	Stadium: Vitality Stadium; Attendance: 10,369; Referee: Craig Pawson

23 September 2017 6	Everton	2–1	Bournemouth	Liverpool
15:00 BST	Schneiderlin (yellow card) 15'; Davies (yellow card) 50'; Niasse 77', 82', (yellow card) 80'	Report	King 49'; Stanislas (yellow card) 90+6'	Stadium: Goodison Park; Attendance: 38,133; Referee: Martin Atkinson

30 September 2017 7	Bournemouth	0–0	Leicester City	Boscombe
15:00 BST	Pugh (yellow card) 20'	Report		Stadium: Vitality Stadium; Attendance: 10,444; Referee: Graham Scott

14 October 2017 8	Tottenham Hotspur	1–0	Bournemouth	Wembley
15:00 BST	Eriksen 47'; Vertonghen (yellow card) 84'	Report	S. Cook (yellow card) 27'; A. Smith (yellow card) 38'; Begović (yellow card) 90+3'	Stadium: Wembley Stadium; Attendance: 73,502; Referee: Bobby Madley

21 October 2017 9	Stoke City	1–2	Bournemouth	Stoke-on-Trent
15:00 BST	Diouf 63'	Report	Surman 16'; Stanislas 18' (pen.); S. Cook (yellow card) 67'	Stadium: Bet365 Stadium; Attendance: 29,500; Referee: Lee Probert

28 October 2017 10	Bournemouth	0–1	Chelsea	Boscombe
17:30 BST	A. Smith (yellow card) 59'; Francis (yellow card) 88'	Report	Hazard 51'	Stadium: Vitality Stadium; Attendance: 10,988; Referee: Craig Pawson

4 November 2017 11	Newcastle United	0–1	Bournemouth	Newcastle upon Tyne
15:00 GMT	Lejeune (yellow card) 63'; Shelvey (yellow card) 84'	Report	Surman (yellow card) 20'; Francis (yellow card) 77'; S. Cook 90+2'	Stadium: St James' Park; Attendance: 52,237; Referee: Paul Tierney

18 November 2017 12	Bournemouth	4–0	Huddersfield Town	Boscombe
15:00 GMT	Wilson 26', 31', 84'; Francis (yellow card) 35' (yellow-red card) 45+4'; Arter 70'	Report		Stadium: Vitality Stadium; Attendance: 10,879; Referee: Lee Probert

25 November 2017 13	Swansea City	0–0	Bournemouth	Swansea
15:00 GMT	Mesa (yellow card) 69'; Olsson (yellow card) 75'; Ki (yellow card) 75'; Bony (yellow card) 90+2'	Report	Ibe (yellow card) 75'; King (yellow card) 88'	Stadium: Liberty Stadium; Attendance: 20,228; Referee: Stuart Attwell

29 November 2017 14	Bournemouth	1–2	Burnley	Boscombe
19:45 GMT	King 79'	Report	Wood 37'; Brady 65'; Vokes (yellow card) 90+6'	Stadium: Vitality Stadium; Attendance: 10,302; Referee: Roger East

3 December 2017 15	Bournemouth	1–1	Southampton	Boscombe
13:30 GMT	Fraser 42'	Report	Austin 61'	Stadium: Vitality Stadium; Attendance: 10,764; Referee: Jonathan Moss

9 December 2017 16	Crystal Palace	2–2	Bournemouth	South Norwood
15:00 GMT	Tomkins (yellow card) 30'; Milivojević (yellow card) 34', (goal) 41' (pen.); Dann 44'; Zaha (yellow card) 71'; McArthur (yellow card) 79'; Benteke (yellow card) 82'	Report	Defoe 10', 45+3'; Begović (yellow card) 40'; L. Cook (yellow card) 71'	Stadium: Selhurst Park; Attendance: 24,823; Referee: Kevin Friend

13 December 2017 17	Manchester United	1–0	Bournemouth	Manchester
20:00 GMT	Lukaku 25', (yellow card) 43'	Report	Gosling (yellow card) 28'; Arter (yellow card) 64'	Stadium: Old Trafford; Attendance: 74,798; Referee: Graham Scott

17 December 2017 18	Bournemouth	0–4	Liverpool	Boscombe
16:30 GMT		Report	Coutinho 20'; Lovren 26'; Salah 44'; Firmino 66'	Stadium: Vitality Stadium; Attendance: 10,780; Referee: Andre Marriner

23 December 2017 19	Manchester City	4–0	Bournemouth	Manchester
15:00 GMT	Agüero 27', 79'; Sterling 53'; Danilo 85'	Report	A. Smith (yellow card) 63'	Stadium: City of Manchester Stadium; Attendance: 54,270; Referee: Mike Jones

26 December 2017 20	Bournemouth	3–3	West Ham United	Boscombe
15:00 GMT	Gosling 29'; Aké 57'; Wilson 90+3'	Report	Collins 7'; Arnautović 81', 89'	Stadium: Vitality Stadium; Attendance: 10,596; Referee: Bobby Madley

30 December 2017 21	Bournemouth	2–1	Everton	Boscombe
15:00 GMT	Fraser 33', 88'	Report	Gueye 57'	Stadium: Vitality Stadium; Attendance: 10,497; Referee: Lee Probert

1 January 2018 22	Brighton & Hove Albion	2–2	Bournemouth	Falmer
12:30 GMT	Knockaert 5'; Murray 48'	Report	S. Cook 33'; Wilson 79'	Stadium: Falmer Stadium; Attendance: 30,152; Referee: Michael Oliver

14 January 2018 23	Bournemouth	2–1	Arsenal	Boscombe
13:30 GMT	Wilson 70'; Ibe 74'	Report	Bellerín 52'	Stadium: Vitality Stadium; Attendance: 10,836; Referee: Kevin Friend

20 January 2018 24	West Ham United	1–1	Bournemouth	Stratford, London
15:00 GMT	Collins (yellow card) 31'; Masuaku (yellow card) 49'; Ogbonna (yellow card) 58'; Hernández 73'	Report	Gosling (yellow card) 52'; Fraser 71'	Stadium: London Stadium; Attendance: 56,948; Referee: Martin Atkinson

31 January 2018 25	Chelsea	0–3	Bournemouth	Fulham
19:45 GMT	Fàbregas (yellow card) 77'	Report	Wilson 51'; Stanislas 64'; Aké 67'	Stadium: Stamford Bridge; Attendance: 41,464; Referee: Lee Probert

3 February 2018 26	Bournemouth	2–1	Stoke City	Boscombe
15:00 GMT	Gosling (yellow card) 58'; King (yellow card) 59', (goal) 70'; Mousset 79'	Report	Shaqiri 5', (yellow card) 45+2'; Ndiaye (yellow card) 38'; Choupo-Moting (yellow card) 69'	Stadium: Vitality Stadium; Attendance: 10,614; Referee: Paul Tierney

11 February 2018 27	Huddersfield Town	4–1	Bournemouth	Huddersfield
12:00 GMT	Pritchard 7'; Mounié 27'; S. Cook 66' (o.g.); Van La Parra 90+5' (pen.)	Report	Stanislas 13'; Gosling (yellow card) 18'; Francis (yellow card) 56'; Mousset (yellow card) 71'	Stadium: John Smith's Stadium; Attendance: 23,823; Referee: Michael Oliver

24 February 2018 28	Bournemouth	2–2	Newcastle United	Boscombe
15:00 GMT	Aké (yellow card) 52'; A. Smith 80'; Gosling 89'	Report	Gayle 17', 45+1'; Ritchie (yellow card) 53'; Yedlin (yellow card) 82'; Diamé (yellow card) 85'; Ayoze (yellow card) 90+1'	Stadium: Vitality Stadium; Attendance: 10,808; Referee: Roger East

3 March 2018 29	Leicester City	1–1	Bournemouth	Leicester
15:00 GMT	Silva (yellow card) 50'; Schmeichel (yellow card) 90+4'; Mahrez 90+7'	Report	King 35' (pen.); Gosling (yellow card) 64'	Stadium: King Power Stadium; Attendance: 31,384; Referee: Lee Probert

11 March 2018 30	Bournemouth	1–4	Tottenham Hotspur	Boscombe
16:00 GMT	Stanislas 7'; Gosling (yellow card) 61'	Report	Rose (yellow card) 18'; Alli 35'; Son 62', 87'; Aurier 90+1'	Stadium: Vitality Stadium; Attendance: 10,623; Referee: Mike Dean

17 March 2018 31	Bournemouth	2–1	West Bromwich Albion	Boscombe
15:00 GMT	A. Smith (yellow card) 53'; Ibe 77'; Stanislas 89'	Report	Livermore (yellow card) 34'; Rodriguez 49'; Dawson (yellow card) 87'	Stadium: Vitality Stadium; Attendance: 10,242; Referee: Graham Scott

31 March 2018 32	Watford	2–2	Bournemouth	Watford
15:00 BST	Femenía 13'; Holebas (yellow card) 42'; Pereyra 49'; Prödl (yellow card) 56'; Doucouré (yellow card) 78'; Okaka (yellow card) 90'	Report	King 43'; Defoe 90+2'	Stadium: Vicarage Road; Attendance: 20,393; Referee: Andy Madley

7 April 2018 33	Bournemouth	2–2	Crystal Palace	Boscombe
15:00 BST	Mousset 65'; Gosling (yellow card) 76'; Francis (yellow card) 82'; King 89'	Report	Milivojević 47'; Zaha 75'; Tomkins (yellow card) 90+3'; Cabaye (yellow card) 90+4'	Stadium: Vitality Stadium; Attendance: 10,730; Referee: Jonathan Moss

14 April 2018 34	Liverpool	3–0	Bournemouth	Liverpool
17:30 BST	Mané 7'; Oxlade-Chamberlain (yellow card) 54'; Salah 69'; Firmino 90'	Report	Aké (yellow card) 15'	Stadium: Anfield; Attendance: 52,959; Referee: Chris Kavanagh

18 April 2018 35	Bournemouth	0–2	Manchester United	Boscombe
19:45 BST	L. Cook (yellow card) 49'; S. Cook (yellow card) 62'; Surman (yellow card) 68'	Report	Smalling 28', (yellow card) 61'; Lukaku 70'	Stadium: Vitality Stadium; Attendance: 10,952; Referee: Graham Scott

28 April 2018 36	Southampton	2–1	Bournemouth	Southampton
15:00 BST	Tadić 25', 54'	Report	King 45+1'	Stadium: St Mary's Stadium; Attendance: 31,778; Referee: Anthony Taylor

5 May 2018 37	Bournemouth	1–0	Swansea City	Boscombe
15:00 BST	Fraser 37'; King (yellow card) 51'	Report	Olsson (yellow card) 36'; Van der Hoorn (yellow card) 58'; Mawson (yellow card) 70'	Stadium: Vitality Stadium; Attendance: 10,820; Referee: Kevin Friend

13 May 2018 38	Burnley	1–2	Bournemouth	Burnley
15:00 BST	Wood 39'	Report	King 74'; Wilson 90+3'	Stadium: Turf Moor; Attendance: 20,720; Referee: Paul Tierney

=== FA Cup ===
In the FA Cup, Bournemouth entered the competition in the third round and were drawn at home to either AFC Fylde or Wigan Athletic. The latter won their replayed match 3–2 to set up the third round tie.

6 January 2018 Third round	Bournemouth	2–2	Wigan Athletic	Boscombe
15:00 GMT	Mousset 55'; S. Cook 90+2'	Report	Grigg 4'; Hyndman 29' (o.g.)	Stadium: Vitality Stadium; Attendance: 9,894; Referee: Andrew Madley

17 January 2018 Third round replay	Wigan Athletic	3–0	Bournemouth	Wigan
19:45 GMT	Morsy 9'; Burn 73'; Elder 76'	Report		Stadium: DW Stadium; Attendance: 4,709; Referee: Stuart Attwell

=== EFL Cup ===
Bournemouth entered the competition in the second round and were drawn against Birmingham City away. A home tie versus Brighton & Hove Albion was confirmed for the third round. The Cherries were drawn at home to Middlesbrough for the fourth round. A quarter-final trip to face Chelsea was drawn out for Bournemouth.

22 August 2017 Second round	Birmingham City	1–2	Bournemouth	Bordesley
19:45 BST	Kieftenbeld 11'; Maghoma (yellow card) 56'; Shotton (yellow card) 62'	Report	Mousset (yellow card) 41'; Fraser 46'; Pugh 68'; A. Smith (yellow card) 90+5'	Stadium: St Andrew's; Attendance: 8,245; Referee: Geoff Eltringham

19 September 2017 Third round	Bournemouth	1–0 (a.e.t.)	Brighton & Hove Albion	Boscombe
19:45 BST	King 99'; Boruc (yellow card) 120'	Report	Skalák (yellow card) 95'	Stadium: Vitality Stadium; Attendance: 10,372; Referee: Kevin Friend

24 October 2017 Fourth round	Bournemouth	3–1	Middlesbrough	Boscombe
19:45 BST	Simpson 49'; Wilson 75' (pen.); Afobe 82'	Report	Fry (yellow card) 39'; Tavernier 56'	Stadium: Vitality Stadium; Attendance: 10,254; Referee: Simon Hooper

20 December 2017 Quarter-finals	Chelsea	2–1	Bournemouth	Fulham
19:45 GMT	Ampadu (yellow card) 2'; Willian 13'; Fàbregas (yellow card) 39'; Zappacosta (yellow card) 62'; Morata 90+1', (yellow card) 90+2'	Report	Simpson (yellow card) 72'; Francis (yellow card) 76'; A. Smith (yellow card) 82'; Gosling 90', (yellow card) 90+1'	Stadium: Stamford Bridge; Attendance: 41,168; Referee: Lee Mason

== Statistics ==
=== Appearances and goals ===
Last updated on 29 April 2018.

No.	Pos	Nat	Player	Total		Premier League		FA Cup		EFL Cup	
No.	Pos	Nat	Player	Apps	Goals	Apps	Goals	Apps	Goals	Apps	Goals
Goalkeepers
1	GK	(Poland) POL	Artur Boruc	6	0	0	0	2	0	4	0
12	GK	(England) ENG	Aaron Ramsdale	0	0	0	0	0	0	0	0
27	GK	(Bosnia and Herzegovina) BIH	Asmir Begović	38	0	38	0	0	0	0	0
32	GK	(Australia) AUS	Adam Federici	0	0	0	0	0	0	0	0
Defenders
2	DF	(England) ENG	Simon Francis	33	0	30+1	0	0	0	2	0
3	DF	(England) ENG	Steve Cook	39	3	30+3	2	2	1	4	0
5	DF	(Netherlands) NED	Nathan Aké	40	2	37+1	2	1	0	0+1	0
11	DF	(England) ENG	Charlie Daniels	37	1	34+1	1	1	0	1	0
14	DF	(Australia) AUS	Brad Smith	3	0	0	0	1	0	2	0
15	DF	(England) ENG	Adam Smith	32	1	22+5	1	1	0	3+1	0
26	DF	(England) ENG	Tyrone Mings	5	0	3+1	0	0	0	1	0
29	DF	(Wales) WAL	Rhoys Wiggins	0	0	0	0	0	0	0	0
42	DF	(England) ENG	Jack Simpson	3	1	1	0	0	0	2	1
Midfielders
4	MF	(England) ENG	Dan Gosling	32	3	21+7	2	0	0	4	1
6	MF	(England) ENG	Andrew Surman	28	2	20+5	2	2	0	1	0
7	MF	(England) ENG	Marc Pugh	25	1	11+9	0	1+1	0	2+1	1
8	MF	(Republic of Ireland) IRL	Harry Arter	16	1	11+2	1	1	0	2	0
16	MF	(England) ENG	Lewis Cook	32	0	25+4	0	0	0	2+1	0
19	MF	(England) ENG	Junior Stanislas	20	5	17+2	5	0	0	1	0
22	MF	(United States) USA	Emerson Hyndman	4	0	1	0	1+1	0	0+1	0
23	MF	(England) ENG	Connor Mahoney	2	0	0	0	2	0	0	0
24	MF	(Scotland) SCO	Ryan Fraser	32	6	23+3	5	2	0	4	1
33	MF	(England) ENG	Jordon Ibe	37	2	21+10	2	0+2	0	1+3	0
36	MF	(England) ENG	Matt Butcher	0	0	0	0	0	0	0	0
58	MF	(England) ENG	Kyle Taylor	1	0	0	0	0+1	0	0	0
Forwards
13	FW	(England) ENG	Callum Wilson	31	9	23+5	8	0+1	0	1+1	1
17	FW	(Norway) NOR	Joshua King	33	9	27+5	8	0	0	0+1	1
18	FW	(England) ENG	Jermain Defoe	26	4	11+13	4	0	0	2	0
31	FW	(France) FRA	Lys Mousset	28	3	4+18	2	2	1	4	0
Player(s) who have made an appearance or had a squad number this season but have left the club
9	FW	(England) ENG	Benik Afobe	22	1	5+12	0	2	0	1+2	1
10	FW	(Ivory Coast) CIV	Max Gradel	0	0	0	0	0	0	0	0
38	DF	(England) ENG	Baily Cargill	0	0	0	0	0	0	0	0

=== Cards ===
Accounts for all competitions. Last updated on 1 January 2018.

No.	Pos.	Name	Yellow card	Red card
1	GK	(Poland) Artur Boruc	1	0
2	DF	(England) Simon Francis	6	1
3	DF	(England) Steve Cook	4	0
4	MF	(England) Dan Gosling	2	0
5	DF	(Netherlands) Nathan Aké	3	0
6	MF	(England) Andrew Surman	1	0
7	MF	(England) Marc Pugh	2	0
8	MF	(Republic of Ireland) Harry Arter	4	0
15	DF	(England) Adam Smith	6	0
16	MF	(England) Lewis Cook	3	0
17	FW	(Norway) Joshua King	1	0
18	FW	(England) Jermain Defoe	1	0
19	MF	(England) Junior Stanislas	1	0
26	DF	(England) Tyrone Mings	1	0
27	GK	(Bosnia and Herzegovina) Asmir Begović	2	0
31	FW	(France) Lys Mousset	2	0
33	MF	(England) Jordon Ibe	1	0
42	DF	(England) Jack Simpson	1	0

=== Clean sheets ===
Last updated on 1 January 2018.

Number	Nation	Name	Matches Played	Premier League	FA Cup	EFL Cup	Total
1	(Poland)	Artur Boruc	4	0	0	1	1
12	(England)	Aaron Ramsdale	0	0	0	0	0
27	(Bosnia and Herzegovina)	Asmir Begović	22	4	0	0	4
32	(Australia)	Adam Federici	0	0	0	0	0
TOTALS				4	0	1	5
