= Artur Boruc =

Polish footballer (born 1980)

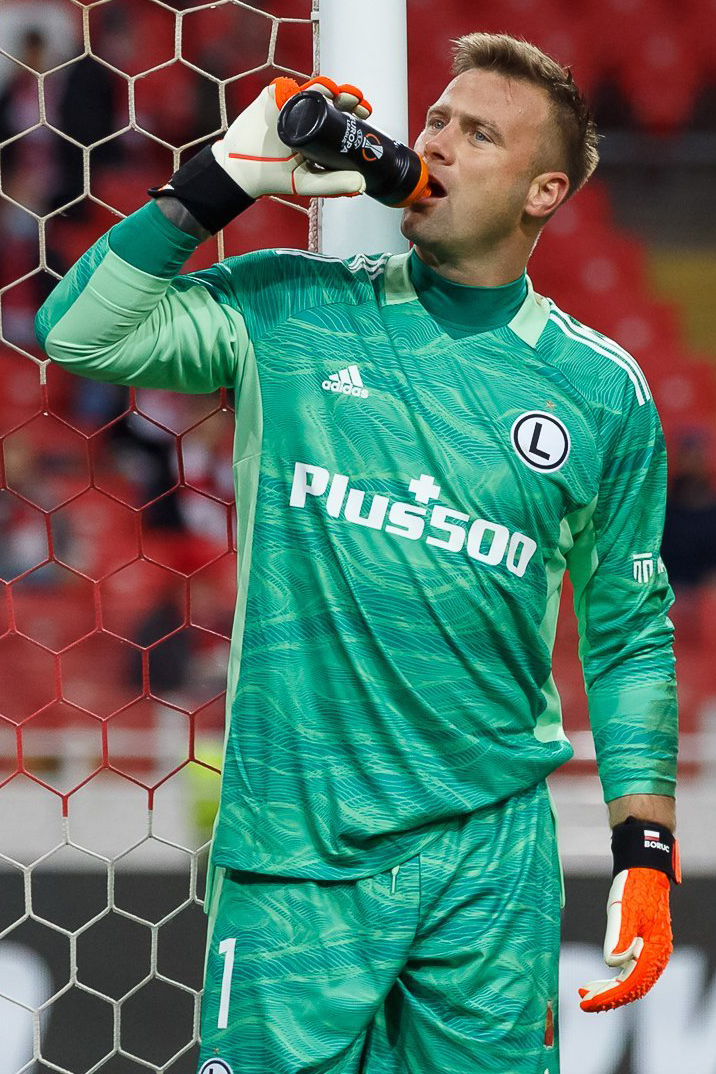
- Boruc playing for Legia Warsaw in 2021

Personal information
- Full name: Artur Boruc
- Date of birth: 20 February 1980 (age 46)
- Place of birth: Siedlce, Poland
- Height: 1.93 m (6 ft 4 in)
- Position: Goalkeeper

Senior career*
Years	Team	Apps	(Gls)
1998–1999	Pogoń Siedlce	12	(0)
1999–2005	Legia Warsaw	69	(1)
2000	→ Dolcan Ząbki (loan)	16	(0)
2005	→ Celtic (loan)	9	(0)
2005–2010	Celtic	153	(0)
2010–2012	Fiorentina	62	(0)
2012–2015	Southampton	49	(0)
2014–2015	→ Bournemouth (loan)	37	(0)
2015–2020	Bournemouth	79	(0)
2020–2022	Legia Warsaw	38	(0)
Total		524	(1)

International career
2004–2017	Poland	65	(0)
- * Club domestic league appearances and goals

Artur Boruc (Polish pronunciation: [ˈartur ˈbɔrut͡s]; born 20 February 1980) is a Polish former professional footballer who played as a goalkeeper.

Boruc began his career in the Polish third division with hometown club Pogoń Siedlce. He joined Ekstraklasa team Legia Warsaw in 1999 and, whilst still a reserve, had a spell on loan at Dolcan Ząbki in 2000. Boruc broke through to the Legia first team in 2002 and by 2003 had become the club's first choice goalkeeper. In the summer of 2005, he joined Scottish Premier League side Celtic. In his five years in Glasgow, Boruc made 221 appearances for the club, winning the league three times, the Scottish Cup once and the Scottish League Cup twice. Celtic fans nicknamed Boruc 'The Holy Goalie' for his devout Catholicism. He moved to Italy in 2010 to join Fiorentina, spending two years at the Serie A club before returning to Britain in 2012 to sign for Premier League side Southampton, moving to Bournemouth in 2015 after a season on loan. In June 2022, Boruc retired from professional football

Boruc made his international debut against the Republic of Ireland in April 2004 and became a regular in the Polish international squad, earning 65 caps. He represented the nation at the 2006 FIFA World Cup, UEFA Euro 2008 and Euro 2016. In November 2017, Boruc retired from international football.

== Club career ==
=== Pogoń Siedlce ===
Born in Siedlce, Boruc began his career in 1998 at Pogoń Siedlce, in his hometown.

=== Legia Warsaw ===
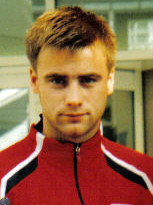
Artur Boruc in his Legia playing days

The next season Boruc joined Legia Warsaw, initially playing for the reserve team, as well as being loaned out in 2000 for half a season to Dolcan Ząbki.

On 8 March 2002, Boruc played his first league match for Legia when he came on as a substitute during a 2–2 draw against Pogoń Szczecin. This unexpected debut was due to an injury sustained by Bulgarian goalkeeper, Radostin Stanev, during the game. Boruc played in Legia's next four league matches and kept clean sheets against Wisła Kraków and Odra Wodzisław, although Stanev regained his place in the side upon his return from injury for the remaining league and cup fixtures. Legia went on to win the Ekstraklasa title that season for the first time in seven years.

In the second half of the following season, 2002–03, Boruc established himself as the club's first choice goalkeeper where he played in 11 of the club's last 15 league fixtures. Legia lost only 1 of these 11 matches and Boruc kept 5 clean sheets, although Legia only managed to finish fourth.

By the 2003–04 season, Boruc was very much a first-pick for Legia and played in all 26 of their league fixtures. In June 2004, Boruc scored his only goal for the club, converting a penalty kick in a home game against Widzew Łódź (final score: 6–0) and then celebrated by waving the corner flag. Legia finished second in the league and qualified for the following season's UEFA Cup. Boruc also made his first appearance for Poland in April 2004, playing in a scoreless draw against the Republic of Ireland.

The 2004–05 season saw Boruc remain Legia's key player and a fan-favourite, again playing in all of the club's league fixtures. Boruc's performances for Legia saw the club extend his contract up to 2012. In March 2005, Boruc was made captain of the side. However, it was another disappointing league campaign for Legia, as they came a distant third behind Wisła Kraków who finished as champions for the third year in a row. Legia's UEFA Cup run was also relatively brief, disposing of FC Tbilisi 7–0 on aggregate in a relatively easy qualifying tie before going out 1–4 on aggregate in the first-round proper to Austria Wien. Despite the lack of silverware, Boruc's form was attracting attention from abroad by the summer of 2005.

=== Celtic ===
On 20 July 2005, Boruc signed with Scottish club Celtic. The deal was initially a year's loan, with an option to make it permanent. The move was later made permanent, with Boruc penning a three-and-a-half-year contract on 17 October until 2009. On 5 January 2008, it was reported that Boruc had signed a new contract with Celtic set to keep him at the club until 2011.

Boruc made his debut for Celtic on 2 August 2005 when he replaced David Marshall for the second leg of their UEFA Champions League qualifier tie against Slovak side Artmedia Bratislava. Celtic won 4–0, but having lost the first leg 5–0 still went out on aggregate. Boruc quickly established himself as first-choice keeper at Celtic, displaying a combination of outstanding shot-stopping, immense self-belief and, at times, outright arrogance. Indeed, gestures allegedly made by Boruc towards Rangers fans at Ibrox Stadium on 12 February 2006 later resulted in the player being cautioned by the police. In his first season, he made 40 appearances and kept 17 clean sheets. Boruc also added to his winner's medals collection as Celtic won the Scottish Premier League and the Scottish League Cup, the latter after beating Dunfermline Athletic 3–0.

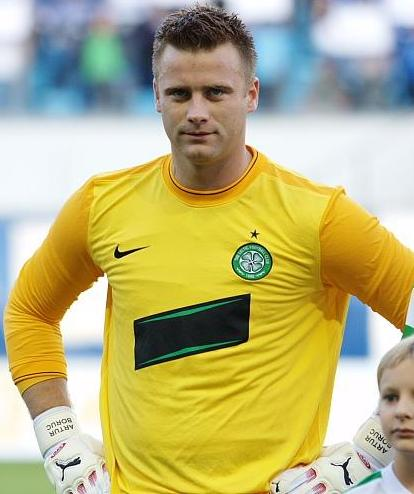
Boruc playing for Celtic in 2009

Boruc continued his fine form for Celtic the following season. On 21 November 2006, in a UEFA Champions League match against Manchester United at Celtic Park, Boruc helped Celtic through to the knockout stage of the competition by saving Louis Saha's 89th-minute penalty. Indeed, Boruc succeeded in keeping a clean sheet in each of Celtic's three home Champions League group stages games (Copenhagen 1–0, Benfica 3–0 and Manchester United 1–0). He was named player of the month for December 2006 in the Scottish Premier League, a very uncommon event for a goalkeeper. His form was also recognised with a nomination for the Scottish PFA Players' Player of the Year award for 2007. The season culminated in more silverware for Boruc as Celtic retained their Scottish Premier League title and defeated Dunfermline 1–0 on 26 May 2007 to win the Scottish Cup.

The start of the 2007–08 season saw Celtic drawn against Russian side Spartak Moscow in the third qualifying round for the Champions League. The tie ended in a penalty shootout, with Boruc saving twice to ensure Celtic's passage to the group stages. The season also saw Celtic complete a hat-trick of consecutive Scottish Premier League titles.

Boruc was fined an estimated £50,000 by Celtic in August 2008 for breaching the club's drinking policy after a pre-season friendly in the Netherlands against Feyenoord.

Boruc endured a decline of form in the first half of season 2008–09 as he committed several goalkeeping errors, in particular against Rangers in a 2–4 defeat at Parkhead on 31 August 2008 where he was badly at fault for Rangers fourth goal, and against Hibernian at Easter Road on 7 December 2008, where John Rankin scored against him from 45 yards out, a goal Rankin later referred to as a "squiggler." He did however save a James McArthur penalty in a 4–0 win over Hamilton Academical on 4 October 2008. Despite this run of relatively poor performances, Boruc was one of 55 players (including five goalkeepers) shortlisted on 20 October 2008 for the FIFPro World XI Player Awards. Discipline, however, also became an issue again, with Boruc fined £500 by the Scottish Football Association (SFA) for gestures he made towards Rangers fans during the Old Firm game in August.

On 28 January 2009, Boruc converted a penalty for Celtic during the penalty shootout in the semi-final match of the League Cup against Dundee United, helping Celtic to an 11–10 win on penalties. Boruc picked up his last silverware at Celtic in the same tournament a couple of months later when Celtic defeated Rangers 2–0 after extra-time in the Scottish League Cup Final.

On 12 December 2009, Boruc made his 200th appearance for Celtic against Motherwell, which Celtic won 3–2. In April 2010, he won the Scottish Premier League save of the season award for a reflex save against Hibernian at Easter Road in August 2009.

On 4 May 2010, Boruc made the last appearance of his Celtic career in a 2–1 victory against Old Firm rivals Rangers, although he had to be substituted in the second half as he was unable to continue playing due to an injury he sustained to his hand in the pre-match warm up. This transpired to be a broken finger and ruled him out of the final league fixture of the season.

=== Fiorentina ===
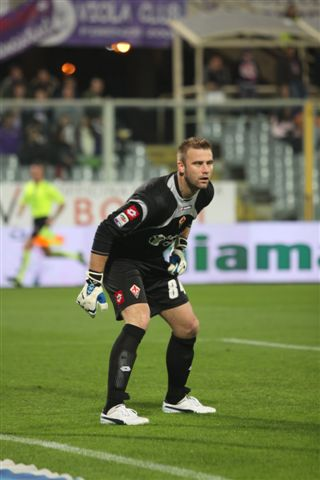
Boruc playing for Fiorentina in 2010

On 12 July 2010, Celtic agreed to sell Boruc to Serie A club Fiorentina subject to a medical, for an undisclosed fee. The transfer was confirmed three days later.

He made his Fiorentina debut on 26 October 2010 in the Coppa Italia against Empoli. After an injury to first-choice goalkeeper Sébastien Frey, he made his Serie A debut in a 1–0 win over Chievo on 7 November 2010. Boruc went on to play in the next 25 Serie A fixtures, before Frey regained his place in the team for the final two league games of the season.

On 18 August 2011, Boruc officially claimed Fiorentina's number one jersey after Frey's move to Genoa. For the next year, Boruc played in all but two of Fiorentina's Serie A fixtures, but despite this he was criticised for some of his performances and apparent lack of fitness. After two seasons in Italy, Boruc was released by Fiorentina in July 2012.

=== Southampton ===
On 22 September 2012, Boruc joined Premier League club Southampton on a one-year deal. He made his debut on 20 October in a 4–1 defeat away to West Ham United at Upton Park.

On 28 October 2012, he was allegedly involved in an incident following Tottenham Hotspur's second goal, when he responded to the jeers coming from behind him by sarcastically applauding the home fans, before throwing a water bottle in their direction. The incident resulted in Boruc being dropped from the side.

Despite the early controversy in his Southampton career, Boruc regained his place in the first team and played in all the club's league matches from 1 January 2013 to the end of the season. On 9 March 2013 in a league match against Norwich City at Carrow Road, Boruc saved a penalty in the 90th minute from Grant Holt. The game finished 0–0, with Southampton winning a point in their bid to avoid relegation. Boruc's form since returning to the Southampton first team resulted in manager Mauricio Pochettino expressing a desire for Boruc to be signed up on a longer-term deal at Southampton. On 18 April 2013 this wish was realised when Boruc signed a new 2-year contract for the club. Southampton's 1–1 draw with Sunderland on 12 May 2013 ensured their Premier League status for the following season, and they eventually finished in 14th place at the end of that season.

Now firmly established as first-choice goalkeeper at Southampton, Boruc helped his team make an excellent start to the 2013–14 season. The club's 2–0 win over Fulham on 26 October 2013 saw the team move to 18 points and into third place in the Premier League, their best-ever start to a top-flight season.

On 2 November 2013, in a 1–1 draw at Stoke City, Boruc conceded a goal to opposing goalkeeper Asmir Begović after just 13 seconds. Three weeks later, under pressure from Arsenal's Olivier Giroud, "instead of simply clearing he did one Cruyff turn, then another, before tying himself into so many knots attempting a third that Giroud was able to nick the ball off him" and score the first of Arsenal's two goals. A week later, he suffered a broken hand trying to keep out a Demba Ba goal in a 3–1 defeat against Chelsea, which kept him out for six weeks. Boruc returned from injury on 11 January 2014 and kept a clean sheet in Southampton's 1–0 win over West Bromwich Albion, impressing with a last minute save from Shane Long to deny the club an equaliser. Boruc maintained his place in his side, and although he was at fault for one of Sunderland's goals in a 2–2 draw on 18 January, he redeemed himself with better performances in 1–0 and 3–0 league wins over Fulham and Hull City respectively during February 2014. His form remained reasonably consistent, although his distribution was occasionally poor, and he helped Southampton to an eighth-place finish in the league at the end of the season.

=== AFC Bournemouth ===
At the start of the 2014–15 season, Fraser Forster arrived at Southampton from Celtic in a £10 million transfer deal, with the Englishman taking over Boruc's place in goal. On 19 September 2014, Boruc joined Championship side AFC Bournemouth on an emergency loan deal until January 2015. He made his debut the following day in a 1–1 draw away against Watford. On 25 October, Bournemouth won 0–8 away at St. Andrew's against Birmingham City. It was the first time that the Cherries had ever scored eight goals in a league game (barring a 10–0 win over Northampton Town in September 1939 which was expunged from the records after World War II broke out the next day), and they recorded their biggest winning margin in a league fixture. Boruc played his part in this statistic by saving a penalty taken by Paul Caddis in the 53rd minute with the score at 0–3. The loan spell at Bournemouth went well, and by the end of December 2014, Boruc had kept clean sheets in nine of his 18 appearances, helping the club go top of the Championship. As such, the loan was extended to the end of the season, with Boruc commenting, "I'm pleased I'm here and that I'm part of a great team, and that's why I'm staying until the end of the season."

On 2 May 2015, Boruc was part of the Bournemouth team which won the Championship title and a first-ever promotion to the Premier League. Twenty-four days later, he was one of six players released by Southampton, joining Bournemouth on a free transfer later that day.

Boruc began the 2015–16 season as Bournemouth's first choice goalkeeper, starting the club's first ever top division match against Aston Villa on 8 August 2015. His and the club's first clean sheet came in a 2–0 defeat of Sunderland at Dean Court on 19 September.

After a poor performance in a 1–5 home defeat by Tottenham Hotspur on 25 October, Boruc was replaced in the Bournemouth goal by Adam Federici for all four of the Cherries' November fixtures. An injury to Federici saw Boruc return to the side for an away fixture at Premier League champions Chelsea on 5 December, with the Polish goalkeeper keeping a clean sheet in a 1–0 win for Bournemouth. A week later, Boruc was a member of the Bournemouth side that beat Manchester United 2–1 at Dean Court.

On 17 May 2018 he signed a new contract with Bournemouth, keeping him at the club until the summer of 2019. He signed a further contract in June 2019.

=== Return to Legia Warsaw ===
On 1 August 2020, Boruc returned to Poland to sign for Legia Warsaw, on a one-year deal. On 17 June 2022, Boruc announced his retirement aged 42, and will have a testimonial-style match between Legia Warsaw and Celtic.

== International career ==
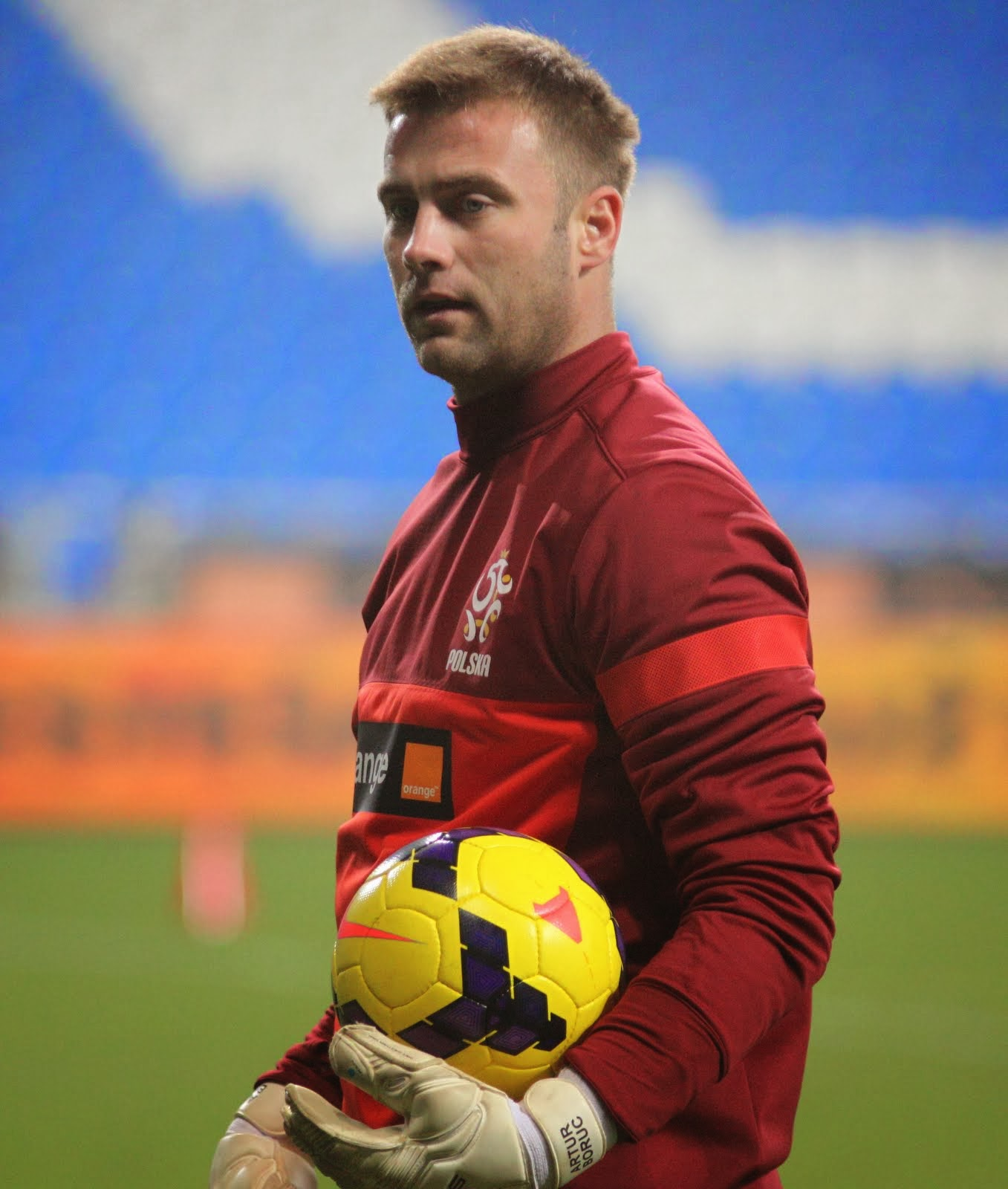
Boruc with the Polish national team in November 2013

=== 2000s ===
On 28 April 2004, Boruc debuted for the Polish senior squad in a goalless friendly draw against the Republic of Ireland, coming on as second-half substitute for Jerzy Dudek. The same year on 12 July, Boruc made his first starting appearance for Poland in another friendly draw against the United States, saving a penalty in the 11th minute from American striker Brian McBride.

On 17 August 2005, Boruc received a red card in the final match Valeri Lobanovsky Memorial Tournament 2005, but this did not prevent his team from winning, and he won the first trophy with the national team.

He soon established himself as a regular in the Polish squad and was selected to the 23-men national squad for the 2006 FIFA World Cup finals held in Germany. Boruc had been fighting with Tomasz Kuszczak and Łukasz Fabiański for the starting slot, but was first choice goalkeeper during the World Cup and played in all three of their games. Boruc was particularly outstanding in the game against Germany, despite being unable to prevent his country losing 1–0.

Boruc remained first choice goalkeeper and was named in Poland's UEFA Euro 2008 squad. He played their first game against Germany and held his place through to the important second game against co-hosts Austria in which the Poles conceded a penalty in the 92nd minute to level the game. In the same match, he saved all three shots by the Austrians, leading to a final score of 1–1. He was nicknamed "Spaceman" by the Austrian and German press during the tournament. The famous Polish striker from the late 1970s and 1980s, Zbigniew Boniek, criticised Poland's team performance at Euro 2008 but singled out Boruc for praise, describing him as "world class."

Boruc incurred the wrath of manager Leo Beenhakker in August 2008 when he and two teammates went on a night out after a friendly match against Ukraine in defiance of the orders of their manager. As a result, Boruc, Dariusz Dudka and Radosław Majewski were all suspended by Beenhakker for the next two internationals. However, Boruc quickly regained his place in the team and continued to be the regular choice until falling from favour again in October 2010 under Beenhakker's successor as Poland manager, Franciszek Smuda.

=== 2010s: Return to national team and international retirement ===
After a two-year absence, Boruc was called up again to the Polish squad in January 2013 and played in their 0–2 defeat against the Republic of Ireland a week later on 6 February 2013. Boruc maintained his place in the international side for their next two competitive games on 22 and 26 March 2013, World Cup qualifiers against Ukraine and San Marino respectively.

Boruc made 64 appearances for his country, with his last appearance coming in a friendly match on 14 November 2016 against Slovenia, playing the first half before coming off as a substitute at half-time in a 1–1 draw. His appearance in that game saw him become the most highly capped goalkeeper for Poland, passing Jan Tomaszewski's record of 63 caps.

In March 2017, Boruc announced his retirement from international football through his Instagram profile, citing his age, "peace of mind" regarding the position of a Polish goalkeeper, and focusing on his career in Bournemouth. He earned his 65th and final appearance during his farewell match against Uruguay on 10 November 2017 in Warsaw, coming off as a substitute shortly before half-time by former Legia Warszawa teammate, Łukasz Fabiański.

== Controversies ==
Boruc was at the centre of many controversies during his Celtic tenure.

On 25 August 2006, Boruc was cautioned by the Strathclyde Police for a breach of the peace for making gestures in front of Rangers fans before a game earlier that year. According to the Sunday Herald, "police reports highlighted three hand gestures made by 26-year-old Boruc ... a V sign at the crowd, another obscene gesture at the crowd and a blessing." The gestures were not caught on video and the caution was issued on the basis of police reports and witness statements. This incident has led to him attaining the nickname "The Holy Goalie".

The Procurator Fiscal said Boruc "was seen by members of the public and police officers to bless himself. Witnesses describe him smiling or laughing at a Rangers section of the crowd and making 'come on' gestures. This action appeared to incense a section of the crowd to react in such a way that police officers and security personnel had to become involved to calm the situation. The police reported that it took 10 minutes to restore normality in the crowd." According to a cross-party working group of the Scottish Parliament, "the sign of the cross in itself is an expression of the Roman Catholic faith; however, using it to alarm, upset or provoke others might be a breach of the peace at common law."

The Catholic Church condemned the legal action, however, expressing regret that "Scotland seems to have made itself one of the few countries in the world where this simple religious gesture is considered an offence." Following extensive press comment, the Crown Office issued a statement on 28 August 2006 stressing that the "very limited" action had been taken against Boruc for gestures made toward Rangers supporters rather than for crossing himself, and that it would not take action against individuals for "acts of religious observance." According to BBC News Online, the caution "brought the issue of sectarianism in Scotland back into sharp focus." The Roman Catholic Church welcomed the Crown Office's clarification of the limited action taken against Boruc, particularly the statement that it "did not in any way refer to the act of blessing himself."

On 17 December 2006, Boruc again crossed himself during his first Old Firm game since the caution, drawing "a roar" from the Rangers fans behind his goal. A spokesman for Celtic defended his gesture, stating "the police have said they have no problem with Artur Boruc in this regard and neither does Celtic Football Club."

Boruc courted further controversy in April 2008 when he displayed a T-shirt saying "God bless the Pope" and bearing a picture of Pope John Paul II after a game against Rangers, and also in May 2007 when he waved a flag proclaiming Celtic the "champions" following a match against Rangers.

== Personal life ==
On 21 April 2007, he helped a 27-year-old pregnant Polish woman, her sister and brother-in-law, when they were attacked in Glasgow.

Boruc's father died in April 2010; his mother Jadwiga died when he was only 20. He has a brother and three sisters. On 11 June 2008, Boruc's then-wife Katarzyna gave birth to their son, Aleksander ("Aleks"), in Warsaw. Boruc and his wife separated in 2008, amid reports of his relationship with former Polish Idol contestant Sara Mannei. Mannei gave birth to daughter Amelia on 9 August 2010 in Poland and the couple married in 2014.

In September 2009, The Scottish Sun published an apology, for claiming Boruc had had an affair with a young woman, shown in a photograph, who was actually his sister. In June 2011, the News of the World admitted it had published a false report on Boruc, and paid him £70,000, believed to be a record for Scottish libel cases, plus legal expenses.

His cousin Max Boruc is also a professional footballer who plays as a goalkeeper, and in 2023 joined Hibernian F.C. of the Scottish Premier League.

== Career statistics ==
=== Club ===
Appearances and goals by club, season and competition
Club	Season	League			National cup (Note: Includes Polish Cup, Scottish Cup, Coppa Italia, FA Cup)		League cup (Note: Includes Polish League Cup, Scottish League Cup, EFL Cup)		Europe		Total	
Club	Season	Division	Apps	Goals	Apps	Goals	Apps	Goals	Apps	Goals	Apps	Goals
Legia Warsaw	2000–01	Ekstraklasa	0	0	0	0	0	0	—		0	0
Legia Warsaw	2001–02	Ekstraklasa	5	0	0	0	1	0	0	0	6	0
Legia Warsaw	2002–03	Ekstraklasa	12	0	0	0	—		0	0	12	0
Legia Warsaw	2003–04	Ekstraklasa	26	1	4	0	—		—		30	1
Legia Warsaw	2004–05	Ekstraklasa	26	0	10	0	—		4 (Note: Appearances in UEFA Cup)	0	40	0
Legia Warsaw	Total		69	1	14	0	1	0	4	0	88	1
Celtic	2005–06	Scottish Premier League	34	0	1	0	4	0	1 (Note: Appearance(s) in UEFA Champions League)	0	40	0
Celtic	2006–07	Scottish Premier League	36	0	5	0	2	0	8	0	51	0
Celtic	2007–08	Scottish Premier League	30	0	4	0	2	0	9	0	45	0
Celtic	2008–09	Scottish Premier League	34	0	3	0	4	0	6	0	47	0
Celtic	2009–10	Scottish Premier League	28	0	2	0	0	0	8 (Note: Four appearances in UEFA Champions League, four appearances in UEFA Europa League)	0	38	0
Celtic	Total		162	0	15	0	12	0	32	0	221	0
Fiorentina	2010–11	Serie A	26	0	1	0	—		—		27	0
Fiorentina	2011–12	Serie A	36	0	1	0	—		—		37	0
Fiorentina	Total		62	0	2	0	—		—		64	0
Southampton	2012–13	Premier League	20	0	1	0	0	0	—		21	0
Southampton	2013–14	Premier League	29	0	0	0	0	0	—		29	0
Southampton	Total		49	0	1	0	0	0	—		50	0
AFC Bournemouth (loan)	2014–15	Championship	37	0	0	0	2	0	—		39	0
AFC Bournemouth	2015–16	Premier League	32	0	0	0	0	0	—		32	0
AFC Bournemouth	2016–17	Premier League	35	0	0	0	0	0	—		35	0
AFC Bournemouth	2017–18	Premier League	0	0	2	0	4	0	—		6	0
AFC Bournemouth	2018–19	Premier League	12	0	1	0	4	0	—		17	0
AFC Bournemouth	2019–20	Premier League	0	0	0	0	0	0	—		0	0
AFC Bournemouth	Bournemouth total		116	0	3	0	10	0	—		129	0
Legia Warsaw	2020–21	Ekstraklasa	25	0	1	0	—		4 (Note: Two appearances in UEFA Champions League, two appearances in UEFA Europa League)	0	30	0
Legia Warsaw	2021–22	Ekstraklasa	11	0	1	0	—		10 (Note: Six appearances in UEFA Champions League, four appearances in UEFA Europa League)	0	22	0
Legia Warsaw	Total		38	0	2	0	—		14	0	52	0
Career total			496	1	37	0	23	0	50	0	606	1

=== International ===
Appearances, conceded goals and clean sheets by national team
National team	Year	Apps	Conceded Goals	Clean Sheets
Poland	2004	4	4	2
Poland	2005	9	9	4
Poland	2006	8	6	3
Poland	2007	10	9	4
Poland	2008	8	11	1
Poland	2009	5	7	2
Poland	2010	2	3	0
Poland	2011	0	0	0
Poland	2012	0	0	0
Poland	2013	10	10	3
Poland	2014	3	2	1
Poland	2015	2	1	1
Poland	2016	3	1	2
Poland	2017	1	0	1
Total		65	63	24

== Honours ==
Legia Warsaw

- Ekstraklasa: 2001–02, 2020–21
- Polish League Cup: 2001–02

Celtic

- Scottish Premier League: 2005–06, 2006–07, 2007–08
- Scottish Cup: 2006–07
- Scottish League Cup: 2005–06, 2008–09

Bournemouth

- Football League Championship: 2014–15

Individual

- Polish Newcomer of the Year: 2004
- PFA Scotland Team of the Year: 2006–07 Premier League, 2007–08 Premier League
- Bournemouth Supporters' Player of the Year: 2016–17
- Piłka Nożna Man of the Year: 2017
