= 2019–20 AFC Bournemouth season =

AFC Bournemouth
2019–20 season
- Owner: Maxim Demin
- Chairman: Jeff Mostyn
- Manager: Eddie Howe
- Stadium: Dean Court
- Premier League: 18th (relegated)
- FA Cup: Fourth round
- EFL Cup: Third round
- Top goalscorer: League: Callum Wilson (8); All: Callum Wilson (9)
Home colours	Away colours	Third colours

The 2019–20 AFC Bournemouth season was the club's fifth consecutive season in the top flight of English football and their 130th year in existence. This season, Bournemouth participated in the Premier League and also participated in the EFL Cup and the FA Cup. The season covered the period from 1 July 2019 to 30 June 2020, which was extended to 26 July 2020 due to the COVID-19 pandemic.

Bournemouth were relegated to the EFL Championship after five years in the Premier League on the final day of the season as they finished just one point from safety in 18th, with their relegation followed by the exit of manager Eddie Howe after eight years in charge five days after the season concluded.

== Squad ==
=== Current squad ===
As of 12 August 2019

Note: Flags indicate national team as defined under FIFA eligibility rules; some limited exceptions apply. Players may hold more than one non-FIFA nationality.

No.	Pos.	Nation	Player
1	GK	POL	Artur Boruc
2	DF	ENG	Simon Francis (captain)
3	DF	ENG	Steve Cook (3rd captain)
4	MF	ENG	Dan Gosling (4th captain)
5	DF	NED	Nathan Aké
6	MF	ENG	Andrew Surman (vice-captain)
7	FW	NOR	Joshua King
8	MF	COL	Jefferson Lerma
9	FW	ENG	Dominic Solanke
10	MF	ENG	Jordon Ibe
11	DF	ENG	Charlie Daniels
12	GK	ENG	Aaron Ramsdale
13	FW	ENG	Callum Wilson
14	MF	NED	Arnaut Danjuma
15	DF	ENG	Adam Smith
16	MF	ENG	Lewis Cook

No.	Pos.	Nation	Player
17	DF	ENG	Jack Stacey
19	MF	ENG	Junior Stanislas
20	MF	WAL	David Brooks
21	DF	ESP	Diego Rico
22	MF	WAL	Harry Wilson (on loan from Liverpool)
24	MF	SCO	Ryan Fraser
25	DF	ENG	Jack Simpson
26	DF	ENG	Lloyd Kelly
28	MF	ENG	Kyle Taylor
29	MF	DEN	Philip Billing
33	DF	WAL	Chris Mepham
36	MF	ENG	Matt Butcher
38	MF	NGA	Nnamdi Ofoborh
42	GK	IRL	Mark Travers
53	MF	IRL	Gavin Kilkenny
54	FW	ROU	Alex Dobre

== Transfers ==
=== Transfers in ===
Date	Position	Nationality	Name	From	Fee	Ref.
1 July 2019	LB	(England)	Lloyd Kelly	(England) Bristol City	£13,000,000	
8 July 2019	RB	(England)	Jack Stacey	(England) Luton Town	£4,000,000	
8 July 2019	DF	(England)	Jordan Zemura	(England) Charlton Athletic	Free transfer	
29 July 2019	CM	(Denmark)	Philip Billing	(England) Huddersfield Town	Undisclosed	
1 August 2019	LW	(Netherlands)	Arnaut Danjuma	(Belgium) Club Brugge	£13,700,000	

=== Loans in ===
Date from	Position	Nationality	Name	From	Date until	Ref.
6 August 2019	RW	(Wales)	Harry Wilson	(England) Liverpool	30 June 2020	

=== Loans out ===
Date from	Position	Nationality	Name	To	Date until	Ref.
1 July 2019	LW	(England)	Mikael Ndjoli	(England) Gillingham	8 January 2020	
8 July 2019	CM	(United States)	Emerson Hyndman	(United States) Atlanta United	9 December 2019	
11 July 2019	MF	(England)	Frank Vincent	(England) Torquay United	30 June 2020	
18 July 2019	GK	(England)	Cameron Plain	(England) Wimborne Town	Work experience	
25 July 2019	GK	(England)	Calum Ward	(England) Weymouth	30 June 2020	
6 August 2019	CM	(Republic of Ireland)	Harry Arter	(England) Fulham	30 June 2020	
6 August 2019	ST	(England)	Sam Surridge	(Wales) Swansea City	1 January 2020	
10 August 2019	CB	(England)	Sam Sherring	(England) Weymouth	30 June 2020	
30 August 2019	MF	(England)	Kyle Taylor	(England) Forest Green Rovers	30 June 2020	
2 September 2019	GK	(Bosnia and Herzegovina)	Asmir Begović	(Azerbaijan) Qarabağ	1 January 2020	
2 September 2019	CB	(England)	Tyler Cordner	(England) Ebbsfleet United	1 January 2020	
2 September 2019	CM	(Nigeria)	Nnamdi Ofoborh	(England) Wycombe Wanderers	30 June 2020	
2 September 2019	RB	(England)	Charlie Seaman	(England) Eastleigh	1 January 2020	
3 September 2019	CB	(England)	Shaun Hobson	(England) Weymouth	30 June 2020	
21 September 2019	MF	(England)	Jack Torniainen	(England) Dorchester Town	Work experience	
26 October 2019	CB	(Scotland)	Brennan Camp	(England) Weymouth	Work experience	
13 January 2020	GK	(Bosnia and Herzegovina)	Asmir Begović	(Italy) Milan	30 June 2020	
13 January 2020	LW	(England)	Mikael Ndjoli	(Scotland) Motherwell	30 June 2020	
16 January 2020	CF	(England)	Jake Scrimshaw	(England) Eastleigh	30 June 2020	
30 January 2020	LB	(Australia)	Brad Smith	(Wales) Cardiff City	30 June 2020	
31 January 2020	FW	(England)	Jaidon Anthony	(England) Weymouth	30 June 2020	
31 January 2020	DM	(England)	Matt Butcher	(Scotland) St Johnstone	30 June 2020	
31 January 2020	LM	(Romania)	Alex Dobre	(England) Wigan Athletic	30 June 2020	
31 January 2020	FW	(England)	Tyrell Hamilton	(England) Gosport Borough	30 June 2020	
1 February 2020	RB	(England)	Charlie Seaman	(England) Maidstone United	30 June 2020	
5 March 2020	CM	(England)	Luke Nippard	(England) Poole Town	30 June 2020	

=== Transfers out ===
Date	Position	Nationality	Name	To	Fee	Ref.
1 July 2019	LW	(England)	Marc Pugh	(England) Queens Park Rangers	Released	
1 July 2019	CM	(England)	James Boote	Free agent	Released	
1 July 2019	FW	(England)	Nathan Clements	Free agent	Released	
1 July 2019	GK	(Australia)	Jordan Holmes	(England) Ebbsfleet United	Released	
1 July 2019	GK	(England)	Tom Parker-Trott	Free agent	Released	
8 July 2019	CB	(England)	Tyrone Mings	(England) Aston Villa	£20,000,000	
9 July 2019	RW	(England)	Connor Mahoney	(England) Millwall	£1,100,000	
21 July 2019	CF	(France)	Lys Mousset	(England) Sheffield United	£10,000,000	
9 December 2019	CM	(United States)	Emerson Hyndman	(United States) Atlanta United	Undisclosed	

== Pre-season ==
In May 2019, AFC Bournemouth announced friendlies with AFC Wimbledon, Brentford and Lazio.

16 July 2019 Friendly	AFC Wimbledon	2–3	Bournemouth	Cartagena, Spain
20:00 CEST	Folivi 47' (pen.); Pigott 53'	Report	C. Wilson 15', 24'; Fraser 78'	Stadium: La Manga Club Football Stadium

20 July 2019 Friendly	Girona	2–1	Bournemouth	Barcelona, Spain
19:00 BST	Gual 80'; Juanpe 86'	Report	Simpson (red card) 71'; Fraser 81'	Stadium: Estadi Olímpic Lluís Companys

26 July 2019 Friendly	West Bromwich Albion	0–0	Bournemouth	West Bromwich
20:00 BST		Report		Stadium: The Hawthorns

27 July 2019 Friendly	Brentford	1–3	Bournemouth	Brentford
15:00 BST	Forss 87'	Report	Solanke 31'; Ibe 70'; Surridge 77'	Stadium: Griffin Park

2 August 2019 Friendly	Bournemouth	3–4	Lazio	Bournemouth
19:45 BST	Lerma 20'; Solanke 31'; Stacey 82'	Report	Correa 14', 75'; Luis Alberto 48'; Parolo 55'	Stadium: Dean Court; Referee: Peter Bankes (England)

3 August 2019 Friendly	Bournemouth	3–0	Lyon	Bournemouth
15:30 BST	C. Wilson 11'; Kilkenny 19'; King 73'	Report		Stadium: Dean Court

== Competitions ==
=== Premier League ===
==== League table ====
Pos	Team	Pld	W	D	L	GF	GA	GD	Pts	Qualification or relegation
16	West Ham United	38	10	9	19	49	62	−13	39	
17	Aston Villa	38	9	8	21	41	67	−26	35	
18	Bournemouth (R)	38	9	7	22	40	65	−25	34	Relegation to EFL Championship
19	Watford (R)	38	8	10	20	36	64	−28	34	Relegation to EFL Championship
20	Norwich City (R)	38	5	6	27	26	75	−49	21	Relegation to EFL Championship

Source: Premier League
Rules for classification: 1) Points; 2) Goal difference; 3) Goals scored; 4) If the champions, relegated teams or qualified teams for UEFA competitions cannot be determined by rules 1 to 3, rules 4.1 to 4.3 are applied – 4.1) Points gained in head to head record between such teams; 4.2) Away goals scored in head to head record between such teams; 4.3) Play-offs
(R) Relegated

==== Results summary ====
Overall								Home						Away					
Pld	W	D	L	GF	GA	GD	Pts	W	D	L	GF	GA	GD	W	D	L	GF	GA	GD
38	9	7	22	40	65	−25	34	5	6	8	22	30	−8	4	1	14	18	35	−17

Last updated: 26 July 2020.
Source: Premier League

==== Results by matchday ====
Matchday	1	2	3	4	5	6	7	8	9	10	11	12	13	14	15	16	17	18	19	20	21	22	23	24	25	26	27	28	29	30	31	32	33	34	35	36	37	38
Ground	H	A	H	A	H	A	H	A	H	A	H	A	H	A	A	H	A	H	H	A	A	H	A	H	H	A	A	H	A	H	A	H	A	H	H	A	H	A
Result	D	W	L	L	W	W	D	L	D	D	W	L	L	L	L	L	W	L	D	L	L	L	L	W	W	L	L	D	L	L	L	L	L	D	W	L	L	W
Position	8	7	11	15	9	6	8	10	9	9	7	9	11	12	14	15	14	14	16	17	19	19	19	18	16	16	16	18	18	18	18	19	19	18	18	18	19	18

Updated to match(es) played on 26 July 2020. Source: Statto.com
A = Away; H = Home; W = Win; D = Draw; L = Loss

==== Matches ====
On 13 June 2019, the Premier League fixtures were announced.

10 August 2019 1	Bournemouth	1–1	Sheffield United	Kings Park
15:00 BST	Smith (yellow card) 43'; Mepham 62'; Fraser (yellow card) 64'	Report	Fleck (yellow card) 78'; Sharp 88'	Stadium: Vitality Stadium; Attendance: 10,714; Referee: Kevin Friend

17 August 2019 2	Aston Villa	1–2	Bournemouth	Birmingham
15:00 BST	Douglas 71'	Report	King 2' (pen.); H. Wilson 12'; Billing (yellow card) 36'; Aké (yellow card) 59'	Stadium: Villa Park; Attendance: 40,996; Referee: Martin Atkinson

25 August 2019 3	Bournemouth	1–3	Manchester City	Bournemouth
14:00 BST	H. Wilson 45+3'; Lerma (yellow card) 56'	Report	Walker (yellow card) 10'; Ederson (yellow card) 13'; Agüero 15', 64'; Sterling 43'	Stadium: Vitality Stadium; Attendance: 10,486; Referee: Andre Marriner
Note: Live on Sky Sports

31 August 2019 4	Leicester City	3–1	Bournemouth	Leicester
15:00 BST	Vardy 12', 73'; Albrighton (yellow card) 40'; Tielemans 41'	Report	C. Wilson 15', (yellow card) 69'; Billing (yellow card) 21'; Lerma (yellow card) 32'	Stadium: King Power Stadium; Attendance: 31,613; Referee: Peter Bankes

15 September 2019 5	Bournemouth	3–1	Everton	Bournemouth
14:00 BST	C. Wilson 23', 72'; Fraser 67'	Report	Delph (yellow card) 40'; Calvert-Lewin 44'; Digne (yellow card) 58'; Richarlison (yellow card) 66'	Stadium: Vitality Stadium; Attendance: 10,416; Referee: Paul Tierney
Note: Live on Sky Sports

20 September 2019 6	Southampton	1–3	Bournemouth	Southampton
20:00 BST	Ward-Prowse 53' (pen.); Romeu (yellow card) 80'	Report	Aké 10'; Lerma (yellow card) 20'; H. Wilson 35' (yellow card) 54'; Stacey (yellow card) 64'; C. Wilson 90+5'	Stadium: St. Mary's Stadium; Attendance: 30,168; Referee: Chris Kavanagh
Note: Live on Sky Sports

28 September 2019 7	Bournemouth	2–2	West Ham United	Bournemouth
15:00 BST	King 17'; Rico (yellow card) 32'; C. Wilson 46'; S. Cook (yellow card) 88'; Lerma (yellow card) 90'	Report	Yarmolenko 10'; Cresswell 74'; Diop (yellow card) 79'	Stadium: Vitality Stadium; Attendance: 10,729; Referee: Stuart Attwell

6 October 2019 8	Arsenal	1–0	Bournemouth	Holloway
14:00 BST	David Luiz 9'; Martinelli (yellow card) 72'	Report	Billing (yellow card) 13'; Stacey (yellow card) 29'	Stadium: Emirates Stadium; Attendance: 60,326; Referee: Martin Atkinson

19 October 2019 9	Bournemouth	0–0	Norwich City	Bournemouth
15:00 BST	Smith (yellow card) 70'	Report	Lewis (yellow card) 29'; McLean (yellow card) 68'; Pukki (yellow card) 86'	Stadium: Vitality Stadium; Attendance: 10,669; Referee: Lee Mason

26 October 2019 10	Watford	0–0	Bournemouth	Watford
15:00 BST	Dawson (yellow card) 41'; Deulofeu (yellow card) 77'; Doucouré (yellow card) 85'; Hughes (yellow card) 87'; Pereyra (yellow card) 89'	Report	C. Wilson (yellow card) 65'; Rico (yellow card) 73'; Billing (yellow card) 80'	Stadium: Vicarage Road; Attendance: 20,821; Referee: Mike Dean

2 November 2019 11	Bournemouth	1–0	Manchester United	Bournemouth
12:30 GMT	Lerma (yellow card) 35'; King 45'; S. Cook (yellow card) 55'; Fraser (yellow card) 62'; C. Wilson (yellow card) 90+1'	Report	Fred (yellow card) 35'; Lindelöf (yellow card) 64'; Young (yellow card) 67'	Stadium: Vitality Stadium; Attendance: 10,669; Referee: Chris Kavanagh

9 November 2019 12	Newcastle United	2–1	Bournemouth	Newcastle
15:00 GMT	Hayden (yellow card) 37'; Yedlin 42'; Clark 52'; Fernández (yellow card) 75'	Report	H. Wilson 14'	Stadium: St James' Park; Attendance: 44,424; Referee: Martin Atkinson

23 November 2019 13	Bournemouth	1–2	Wolverhampton Wanderers	Bournemouth
15:00 GMT	Billing (yellow card) 17'; Francis (yellow card) 21' (yellow-red card) 37'; S. Cook 59'; Rico (yellow card) 90'	Report	Saïss (yellow card) 4'; Moutinho 21'; Jiménez 31'	Stadium: Vitality Stadium; Attendance: 10,539; Referee: Simon Hooper

30 November 2019 14	Tottenham Hotspur	3–2	Bournemouth	Tottenham
15:00 GMT	Alli 21', 50'; Sissoko 69'	Report	Rico (yellow card) 67'; H. Wilson 73', 90+6'; Lerma (yellow card) 90'	Stadium: Tottenham Hotspur Stadium; Attendance: 59,626; Referee: Lee Mason

3 December 2019 15	Crystal Palace	1–0	Bournemouth	Selhurst
19:30 GMT	Sakho (red card) 19'; Milivojević (yellow card) 71'; McCarthy (yellow card) 72'; Schlupp 76'; McArthur (yellow card) 85'	Report	Solanke (yellow card) 64'; Lerma (yellow card) 67'; Billing (yellow card) 78'	Stadium: Selhurst Park; Attendance: 23,497; Referee: Anthony Taylor

7 December 2019 16	Bournemouth	0–3	Liverpool	Bournemouth
15:00 GMT		Report	Oxlade-Chamberlain 35'; Gomez (yellow card) 39'; Keïta 44'; Salah 54'	Stadium: Vitality Stadium; Attendance: 10,832; Referee: Chris Kavanagh

14 December 2019 17	Chelsea	0–1	Bournemouth	Fulham
15:00 GMT	Kovačić (yellow card) 81'	Report	L. Cook (yellow card) 50'; Gosling (yellow card) 82', (goal) 84'	Stadium: Stamford Bridge; Attendance: 40,243; Referee: Graham Scott

21 December 2019 18	Bournemouth	0–1	Burnley	Bournemouth
15:00 GMT	Rico (yellow card) 56'; Francis (yellow card) 61'	Report	Westwood (yellow card) 45+1'; Barnes (yellow card) 56'; McNeil (yellow card) 56'; Hendrick (yellow card) 62'; Rodriguez 89'	Stadium: Vitality Stadium; Attendance: 10,020; Referee: Martin Atkinson

26 December 2019 19	Bournemouth	1–1	Arsenal	Bournemouth
15:00 GMT	Gosling 35'; Lerma (yellow card) 53'; Mepham (yellow card) 84'; L. Cook (yellow card) 85'; C. Wilson (yellow card) 90+4'	Report	Torreira (yellow card) 54'; Maitland-Niles (yellow card) 55'; Aubameyang 63', (yellow card) 64'; Lacazette (yellow card) 90+3'	Stadium: Vitality Stadium; Attendance: 10,234; Referee: Stuart Attwell

28 December 2019 20	Brighton & Hove Albion	2–0	Bournemouth	Falmer
12:30 GMT	Jahanbakhsh 3'; Mooy 79'	Report	S. Cook (yellow card) 22'; Billing (yellow card) 67'	Stadium: Falmer Stadium; Attendance: 30,441; Referee: Paul Tierney

1 January 2020 21	West Ham United	4–0	Bournemouth	Stratford
17:30 GMT	Noble 17', 35' (pen.); Haller 26'; Anderson 66'; Cresswell (yellow card) 77'	Report	Rico (yellow card) 23'; L. Cook (yellow card) 88'	Stadium: London Stadium; Attendance: 59,917; Referee: Graham Scott

12 January 2020 22	Bournemouth	0–3	Watford	Bournemouth
14:00 GMT	Smith (yellow card) 13'	Report	Doucouré 43'; Deeney (yellow card) 57', (goal) 65'; Pereyra 90+3'	Stadium: Vitality Stadium; Attendance: 10,384; Referee: Mike Dean

18 January 2020 23	Norwich City	1–0	Bournemouth	Norwich
15:00 GMT	Pukki 33' (pen.); Buendía (yellow card) 50'; Godfrey (red card) 76'; Krul (yellow card) 77'	Report	S. Cook (red card) 31'; C. Wilson (yellow card) 77'; Smith (yellow card) 90+5'	Stadium: Carrow Road; Attendance: 26,781; Referee: Paul Tierney

21 January 2020 24	Bournemouth	3–1	Brighton & Hove Albion	Bournemouth
19:30 GMT	H. Wilson 36'; Groß 41' (o.g.); C. Wilson 74'; Lerma (yellow card) 90+1'	Report	Bernardo (yellow card) 28'; Mooy 81'	Stadium: Vitality Stadium; Attendance: 10,065; Referee: Kevin Friend

1 February 2020 25	Bournemouth	2–1	Aston Villa	Bournemouth
15:00 GMT	Lerma (yellow card) 18' (yellow-red card) 51'; Billing 37'; Ake 44'; C. Wilson (yellow card) 65'	Report	Mings (yellow card) 36'; Douglas Luiz (yellow card) 43'; Samatta 70'; Hause (yellow card) 90+1'	Stadium: Vitality Stadium; Referee: Anthony Taylor

9 February 2020 26	Sheffield United	2–1	Bournemouth	Sheffield
14:00 GMT	Stevens (yellow card) 39'; Sharp 45+2'; Lundstram 84'; Mousset (yellow card) 89'	Report	C. Wilson 13'; Surman (yellow card) 53'; Francis (yellow card) 90+4'	Stadium: Bramall Lane; Attendance: 30,361; Referee: Jonathan Moss

22 February 2020 27	Burnley	3–0	Bournemouth	Burnley
15:00 GMT	Vydra 53'; Rodriguez 61' (pen.); Bardsley (yellow card) 64'; Lennon (yellow card) 83'; McNeil 87'; Hendrick (yellow card) 89'; Mee (yellow card) 90+4'	Report	Francis (yellow card) 43'; Smith (yellow card) 90'; S. Cook (yellow card) 90'	Stadium: Turf Moor; Attendance: 18,227; Referee: Mike Dean

29 February 2020 28	Bournemouth	2–2	Chelsea	Bournemouth
15:00 GMT	Lerma 54'; King 57'; Smith (yellow card) 59'; C. Wilson (yellow card) 88'	Report	Jorginho (yellow card) 17'; Alonso 33', 85'; Christensen (yellow card) 71'	Stadium: Vitality Stadium; Attendance: 10,667; Referee: Andre Marriner

7 March 2020 29	Liverpool	2–1	Bournemouth	Liverpool
12:30 GMT	Salah 25'; Mané 33'	Report	C. Wilson 9', (yellow card) 90+2'	Stadium: Anfield; Attendance: 53,323; Referee: Paul Tierney

20 June 2020 30	Bournemouth	0–2	Crystal Palace	Bournemouth
19:45 BST	Smith (yellow card) 45+2'; L. Cook (yellow card) 67'; S. Cook (yellow card) 87'	Report	Milivojević 12'; Ayew 23', (yellow card) 45'; Ward (yellow card) 71'	Stadium: Vitality Stadium; Attendance: 0 Referee: Stuart Attwell
Note: Match was originally due to be played on 14 March, but the season was suspended on 13 March until 3 April, due to the COVID-19 pandemic. It was rescheduled to 20 June.

24 June 2020 31	Wolverhampton Wanderers	1–0	Bournemouth	Wolverhampton
18:00 BST	Saïss (yellow card) 27'; Neves (yellow card) 41'; Jiménez 60'; Moutinho (yellow card) 87'	Report	Brooks (yellow card) 34'; S. Cook (yellow card) 36'; C. Wilson (yellow card) 39'	Stadium: Molineux; Attendance: 0 Referee: Michael Oliver
Note: Match was originally due to be played on 22 March, but the season was suspended on 13 March until 3 April, due to the COVID-19 pandemic. It was rescheduled to 24 June.

1 July 2020 32	Bournemouth	1–4	Newcastle United	Bournemouth
18:00 BST	Kelly (yellow card) 23'; Aké (yellow card) 45+2'; Gosling 90+3'	Report	Gayle 5'; S. Longstaff 30'; Almirón 57'; Lazaro 77'	Stadium: Vitality Stadium; Attendance: 0 Referee: Kevin Friend
Note: Match originally due to be played on 4 April, but the season was suspended on 19 March until 30 April, due to the COVID-19 pandemic. It was rescheduled to 1 July.

4 July 2020 33	Manchester United	5–2	Bournemouth	Manchester
15:00 BST	Greenwood 29', 54'; Rashford 35' (pen.); Martial 45+2'; Fernandes 59'	Report	Stanislas 15'; Lerma (yellow card) 31'; King 50' (pen.)	Stadium: Old Trafford; Attendance: 0 Referee: Mike Dean
Note: Match originally due to be played on 11 April, but the season was suspended on 19 March until 30 April, due to the COVID-19 pandemic. It was rescheduled to 4 July.

9 July 2020 34	Bournemouth	0–0	Tottenham Hotspur	Bournemouth
18:00 BST	Lerma (yellow card) 31'; Gosling (yellow card) 87'; H. Wilson (yellow card) 90+5'	Report	Sissoko (yellow card) 31'; Ndombele (yellow card) 87'	Stadium: Vitality Stadium; Attendance: 0 Referee: Paul Tierney
Note: Match originally due to be played on 18 April, but the season was suspended on 3 April until it was safe to resume due to the coronavirus pandemic. It was rescheduled to 9 July.

12 July 2020 35	Bournemouth	4–1	Leicester City	Bournemouth
19:00 BST	Gosling (yellow card) 32'; Stanislas 65' (pen.), (yellow card) 86'; Solanke 67', 87'; Evans 83' (o.g.)	Report	Vardy 23'; Ndidi (yellow card) 65'; Söyüncü (red card) 67'	Stadium: Vitality Stadium; Attendance: 0 Referee: Stuart Attwell
Note: Match originally due to be played on 25 April, but the season was suspended on 3 April until it was safe to resume due to the coronavirus pandemic. It was rescheduled to 12 July.

15 July 2020 36	Manchester City	2–1	Bournemouth	Manchester
18:00 BST	D. Silva 6'; Gabriel Jesus 39'; García (yellow card) 90+4'	Report	Kelly (yellow card) 17'; Brooks 88'	Stadium: City of Manchester Stadium; Attendance: 0 Referee: Lee Mason
Note: Match originally due to be played on 2 May, but the season was suspended on 3 April until it was safe to resume due to the coronavirus pandemic. It was rescheduled to 15 July.

19 July 2020 37	Bournemouth	0–2	Southampton	Bournemouth
14:00 BST	Billing (yellow card) 47'; L. Cook (yellow card) 78'	Report	Vestergaard (yellow card) 34'; Ings 41'; Ward-Prowse (yellow card) 90+3'; Adams 90+9'	Stadium: Vitality Stadium; Attendance: 0 Referee: Craig Pawson
Note: Match originally due to be played on 9 May, but the season was suspended on 3 April until it was safe to resume due to the coronavirus pandemic. It was rescheduled to 19 July.

26 July 2020 38	Everton	1–3	Bournemouth	Liverpool
16:00 BST	Kean 41'; Keane (yellow card) 79'	Report	King 13' (pen.); Solanke 45+1'; Stanislas 80'	Stadium: Goodison Park; Attendance: 0 Referee: Chris Kavanagh
Note: Match originally due to be played on 17 May, but the season was suspended on 3 April until it was safe to resume due to the coronavirus pandemic. It was rescheduled to 26 July.

=== FA Cup ===
4 January 2020 Third round	Bournemouth	4–0	Luton Town	Kings Park
15:00 GMT	Billing 8', 79', (yellow card) 41'; C. Wilson 67'; Solanke 82'	Report	Jones (yellow card) 41'	Stadium: Vitality Stadium; Attendance: 10,064; Referee: Darren England

27 January 2020 Fourth round	Bournemouth	1–2	Arsenal	Bournemouth
20:00 GMT	H. Wilson (yellow card) 45+1'; Surridge 90+4', (yellow card) 90+8'	Report	Saka 5'; Nketiah 26'; Xhaka (yellow card) 90+2'	Stadium: Vitality Stadium; Attendance: 10,308; Referee: Martin Atkinson

=== EFL Cup ===
The second round draw was made on 13 August 2019 following the conclusion of all but one first-round matches. The third round draw was confirmed on 28 August 2019, live on Sky Sports.

28 August 2019 Second round	Bournemouth	0–0 (3–0 p)	Forest Green Rovers	Kings Park
19:45 BST		Report	Kitching (yellow card) 72'	Stadium: Vitality Stadium; Attendance: 9,657; Referee: Dean Whitestone
	Penalties
	King (penalty scored); Solanke (penalty scored); Ibe (penalty missed); Billing (penalty scored)		(penalty missed) Mills; (penalty missed) Dawson; (penalty missed) Morton

25 September 2019 Third round	Burton Albion	2–0	Bournemouth	Burton upon Trent
19:45 BST	Sarkic 14'; Nartey (yellow card) 38'; Edwards (yellow card) 53'; Akins (yellow card) 70'; Broadhead 72'	Report	Simpson (yellow card) 50'; Ibe (yellow card) 87'	Stadium: Pirelli Stadium; Attendance: 2,505; Referee: John Busby

== Squad statistics ==
As of 26 July 2020

No.	Pos	Nat	Player	Total		Premier League		FA Cup		EFL Cup	
No.	Pos	Nat	Player	Apps	Goals	Apps	Goals	Apps	Goals	Apps	Goals
Goalkeepers
1	GK	(Poland) POL	Artur Boruc	0	0	0	0	0	0	0	0
12	GK	(England) ENG	Aaron Ramsdale	37	0	37	0	0	0	0	0
42	GK	(Republic of Ireland) IRL	Mark Travers	5	0	1	0	2	0	2	0
Defenders
2	DF	(England) ENG	Simon Francis	18	0	10+5	0	1+1	0	1	0
3	DF	(England) ENG	Steve Cook	31	1	28+1	1	1+1	0	0	0
5	DF	(Netherlands) NED	Nathan Aké	30	2	29	2	1	0	0	0
11	DF	(England) ENG	Charlie Daniels	2	0	2	0	0	0	0	0
15	DF	(England) ENG	Adam Smith	25	0	24	0	1	0	0	0
17	DF	(England) ENG	Jack Stacey	20	0	17+2	0	0	0	1	0
21	DF	(Spain) ESP	Diego Rico	29	0	27	0	1	0	1	0
25	DF	(England) ENG	Jack Simpson	8	0	1+3	0	2	0	2	0
26	DF	(England) ENG	Lloyd Kelly	9	0	7+1	0	0	0	1	0
33	DF	(Wales) WAL	Chris Mepham	15	1	10+2	1	1	0	2	0
Midfielders
4	MF	(England) ENG	Dan Gosling	25	3	14+10	3	1	0	0	0
6	MF	(England) ENG	Andrew Surman	9	0	2+3	0	2	0	2	0
8	MF	(Colombia) COL	Jefferson Lerma	33	1	31+2	1	0	0	0	0
10	MF	(England) ENG	Jordon Ibe	4	0	0+2	0	0	0	2	0
16	MF	(England) ENG	Lewis Cook	29	0	14+13	0	1	0	1	0
19	MF	(England) ENG	Junior Stanislas	16	3	7+8	3	1	0	0	0
20	MF	(Wales) WAL	David Brooks	9	1	8+1	1	0	0	0	0
22	MF	(Wales) WAL	Harry Wilson	35	7	20+11	7	2	0	1+1	0
24	MF	(Scotland) SCO	Ryan Fraser	32	1	21+7	1	2	0	1+1	0
29	MF	(Denmark) DEN	Philip Billing	36	3	29+5	1	1	2	0+1	0
53	MF	(Republic of Ireland) IRL	Gavin Kilkenny	2	0	0	0	0	0	2	0
Forwards
7	FW	(Norway) NOR	Joshua King	27	6	24+2	6	0	0	0+1	0
9	FW	(England) ENG	Dominic Solanke	36	4	17+15	3	2	1	2	0
13	FW	(England) ENG	Callum Wilson	39	9	32+3	8	0+2	1	1+1	0
14	FW	(Netherlands) NED	Arnaut Danjuma	15	0	6+8	0	0	0	0+1	0
44	FW	(England) ENG	Sam Surridge	5	1	0+4	0	0+1	1	0	0
Players who have made an appearance or had a squad number this season but have left the club
54	FW	(Romania) ROU	Alex Dobre	1	0	0	0	0+1	0	0	0
