= Jordan Lee (footballer) =

English footballer

Personal information
- Full name: Jordan Michael Lee
- Date of birth: 31 December 1996 (age 29)
- Place of birth: Bournemouth, England
- Height: 1.78 m (5 ft 10 in)
- Position: Defender

Youth career
- –2016: AFC Bournemouth

Senior career*
Years	Team	Apps	(Gls)
2016–	AFC Bournemouth	0	(0)
2017	→ Torquay United (loan)	9	(1)
2017	→ Torquay United (loan)	2	(0)
- * Club domestic league appearances and goals as of 14:41, 6 October 2017 (UTC)

Jordan Michael Lee (born 31 December 1996) is an English professional football defender who last played for Wimborne Town.

== Club career ==
=== Bournemouth ===
After starting his career with Premier League side AFC Bournemouth, Lee made his debut in an FA Cup third round tie against Birmingham City. Lee featured up until the 84th minute, after he was replaced by Steve Cook in the 2–1 victory. On 7 January 2017, Lee made his second appearance for Bournemouth once again in an FA Cup tie. The game resulted in a 3–0 defeat against League One side Millwall, in which Lee featured for 45 mins before being replaced by Cook.

He had his contract cancelled by the club in February 2018 by mutual consent.

==== Torquay United (loan) ====
On 13 January 2017, Lee joined National League side Torquay United on loan for the remainder of the 2016–17 campaign.

On 24 July 2017, Lee returned to Torquay United on loan for a second time until January 2018.

== Career statistics ==
As of match played 3 October 2017

Appearances and goals by club, season and competition
Club	Season	League			FA Cup		League Cup		Other		Total	
Club	Season	Division	Apps	Goals	Apps	Goals	Apps	Goals	Apps	Goals	Apps	Goals
AFC Bournemouth	2015–16	Premier League	0	0	1	0	0	0	—		1	0
AFC Bournemouth	2016–17	Premier League	0	0	1	0	0	0	—		1	0
AFC Bournemouth	Total		0	0	2	0	0	0	0	0	2	0
Torquay United (loan)	2016–17	National League	9	1	—		—		0	0	9	1
Torquay United (loan)	2017–18	National League	2	0	0	0	—		0	0	2	0
Career total			11	1	2	0	0	0	0	0	13	1
