= 2012–13 AFC Bournemouth season =

Bournemouth
2012–13 season
- Chairman: Eddie Mitchell and Maxim Demin
- Manager: Paul Groves (until 12 October); Eddie Howe (from 12 October)
- Stadium: Dean Court
- League One: 2nd (promoted)
- FA Cup: Third round (eliminated by Wigan Athletic)
- League Cup: First round (eliminated by Oxford United)
- League Trophy: First round (eliminated by Portsmouth)
- Top goalscorer: League: Brett Pitman (20); All: Brett Pitman (20)

The 2012–13 AFC Bournemouth season saw the club compete in League One where they finished in second place gaining promotion to the 2013–14 Football League Championship. In the League Cup they were knocked out to Oxford United in the first round. In the FA Cup they reached the third round where they drew away to Wigan Athletic the result ended 1–1 which required a reply. In the reply at home Bournemouth lost 1–0 and were knocked out of the competition. Bournemouth also completed in the League Trophy and in the first round they were drawn away against Portsmouth. The match finished 2–2 and required a shoot-out, the Cherries lost 4–3 on penalties.

== Season squad ==
No.	Name	Position (s)	Place of birth	Date of birth (age)	Signed from	Date signed	Fee	Contract End
1	(England) Shwan Jalal	GK	Baghdad	14 August 1983 (age 43)	Peterborough United	29 August 2008	Free	30 June 2014
2	(England) Simon Francis	DF	Nottingham	16 February 1985 (age 41)	Charlton Athletic	7 November 2011	Free	Undisclosed
3	(England) Steve Cook	DF	Hastings	19 April 1991 (age 35)	Brighton & Hove Albion	3 January 2012	£150,000	30 June 2015
4	(Guadeloupe) Stéphane Zubar	DF	Pointe-à-Pitre	9 October 1986 (age 39)	Plymouth Argyle	22 September 2011	Free	30 June 2015
5	(England) Danny Seaborne	CB	Barnstaple	5 March 1987 (age 39)	Southampton	17 January 2013	Loan	30 June 2013
6	(Wales) Joe Partington	DF	Portsmouth	1 April 1990 (age 36)	Academy	30 July 2007	Trainee	30 June 2013
7	(England) Marc Pugh	MF	Bacup	2 April 1987 (age 39)	Hereford United	4 June 2010	Free	30 June 2016
8	(Republic of Ireland) Harry Arter	CM, DM	Sidcup	28 December 1989 (age 36)	Woking	7 June 2010	Free	Undisclosed
9	(England) Wes Thomas	FW	London	23 January 1987 (age 39)	Crawley Town	1 January 2012	£200,000	Undisclosed
10	(England) Charlie Sheringham	FW	Chingford	17 April 1988 (age 38)	Dartford	20 October 2011	Undisclosed	30 June 2013
11	(England) Charlie Daniels	DF	Harlow	7 September 1986 (age 40)	Leyton Orient	24 November 2011	£200,000	30 June 2015
12	(England) Wes Fogden	MF	Brighton	12 April 1988 (age 38)	Havant & Waterlooville	5 November 2011	Free	30 June 2015
13	(England) Tommy Elphick	DF	Brighton	7 September 1987 (age 39)	Brighton & Hove Albion	10 August 2012	Undisclosed	30 June 2015
14	(Netherlands) Frank Demouge	FW	Nijmegen	25 June 1982 (age 44)	FC Utrecht	20 June 2012	Free	30 June 2014
15	(Republic of Ireland) Marcos Painter	LB	Solihull	17 August 1986 (age 40)	Brighton & Hove Albion	15 February 2013	Loan	31 May 2013
16	(Wales) Shaun MacDonald	MF	Swansea	17 June 1988 (age 38)	Swansea City	25 August 2011	£80,000	30 June 2016
17	(Northern Ireland) Josh McQuoid	FW	Southampton	15 December 1989 (age 36)	Millwall	30 May 2012	Player swap	30 June 2015
18	(England) Matt Tubbs	FW	Salisbury	15 July 1984 (age 42)	Crawley Town	30 January 2012	£500,000	30 June 2015
20	(Scotland) Ryan Fraser	MF	Aberdeen	24 February 1994 (age 32)	Aberdeen	18 January 2013	£400,000	30 June 2016
19	(England) Stephen Purches	DF	London	14 January 1980 (age 46)	Leyton Orient	7 June 2010	Free	30 June 2013
21	(England) Ryan Allsop	GK	Birmingham	17 June 1992 (age 34)	Leyton Orient	18 January 2013	Free	30 June 2016
22	(England) Lewis Grabban	FW	Croydon	12 January 1988 (age 38)	Rotherham United	31 May 2012	£300,000	Undisclosed
23	(Republic of Ireland) Donal McDermott	FW	Ashbourne	19 October 1989 (age 36)	Huddersfield Town	31 January 2012	£175,000	30 June 2015
24	(England) Miles Addison	DF, MF	Newham	7 January 1989 (age 37)	Derby County	12 July 2012	Undisclosed	30 June 2015
25	(England) Darryl Flahavan	GK	Southampton	28 November 1978 (age 47)	Portsmouth	28 June 2011	Free	30 June 2013
26	(Scotland) Richard Hughes	DF	Glasgow	25 June 1979 (age 47)	Free agent	4 August 2012	Free	30 June 2014
28	(England) Lee Barnard	FW	Romford	18 July 1984 (age 42)	Southampton	18 August 2012	Loan	1 January 2013
30	(England) Matt Ritchie	MF	Gosport	10 September 1989 (age 37)	Swindon Town	30 January 2013	£500,000	30 June 2016
32	(Republic of Ireland) Eunan O'Kane	MF	Derry	10 July 1990 (age 36)	Torquay United	26 July 2012	Undisclosed	30 June 2015
33	(England) Steve Fletcher	FW	Hartlepool	26 July 1972 (age 54)	Crawley Town	23 January 2009	Free	Undisclosed
34	(England) David James	GK	Welwyn Garden City	1 August 1970 (age 56)	Bristol City	27 September 2012	Free	30 June 2013
35	(England) Josh Carmichael	MF	Poole	27 September 1994 (age 31)	Academy	30 June 2011	Trainee	30 June 2013
37	(Liechtenstein) Benjamin Büchel	GK	Ruggell	4 July 1989 (age 37)	USV Eschen/Mauren	31 August 2012	Free	30 June 2013
40	(Jersey) Brett Pitman	FW	St Helier	31 January 1988 (age 38)	Bristol City	1 January 2013	Undisclosed	30 June 2016

== Kit ==
Supplier: Fila
Sponsor(s): Energy Consulting

Home	Away	Alternative

Last updated: 11 September 2012.
Source: Historical Kits

== Competitions ==
=== League One ===
Pos	Team	Pld	W	D	L	GF	GA	GD	Pts	Promotion, qualification or relegation
1	Doncaster Rovers (C, P)	46	25	9	12	62	44	+18	84	Promotion to Football League Championship
2	Bournemouth (P)	46	24	11	11	76	53	+23	83	Promotion to Football League Championship
3	Brentford	46	21	16	9	62	47	+15	79	Qualification for League One play-offs (Note: Four teams play for one spot and promotion to Football League Championship.)
4	Yeovil Town (O, P)	46	23	8	15	71	56	+15	77	Qualification for League One play-offs
5	Sheffield United	46	19	18	9	56	42	+14	75	Qualification for League One play-offs

Updated to match(es) played on 27 April 2013. Source: BBC Sport
Rules for classification: 1) Points; 2) Goal difference; 3) Number of goals scored
(C) Champions; (O) Play-off winners; (P) Promoted

=== Results summary ===
Overall								Home						Away					
Pld	W	D	L	GF	GA	GD	Pts	W	D	L	GF	GA	GD	W	D	L	GF	GA	GD
41	22	11	8	66	51	+15	77	12	6	4	38	23	+15	10	5	4	28	28	0

Last updated: 28 April 2013.

=== Results per matchday ===
Matchday	1	2	3	4	5	6	7	8	9	10	11	12	13	14	15	16	17	18	19	20	21	22	23	24	25	26	27	28	29	30	31	32	33	34	35	36	37	38	39	40	41	42	43	44	45	46
Ground	A	H	H	A	A	H	H	A	H	A	A	H	H	A	A	H	A	H	H	A	A	H	H	H	A	H	A	A	H	A	H	A	A	H	H	A	H	A	A	H	A	H	H	A	H	A
Result	D	D	D	L	W	D	D	L	L	L	L	W	W	D	W	W	W	W	D	D	W	W	W	W	D	D	L	W	W	W	W	W	L	L	L	L	L	W	W	W	W	W	W	W	W	D
Position	7	12	14	18	15	16	17	17	17	19	19	19	17	18	15	12	12	11	11	10	9	9	6	5	6	7	6	6	5	4	3	3	2	5	6	7	7	7	5	4	3	3	2	2	1	2

Source: WorldFootball.com
A = Away; H = Home; W = Win; D = Draw; L = Loss

=== Matches ===
18 August 1	Portsmouth	1–1	Bournemouth	Fratton Park
15:00 BST	McLeod 19'	Report	78' Barnard	Attendance: 17,703; Referee: Taylor

21 August 2	Bournemouth	1–1	Milton Keynes Dons	Dean Court
19:45 BST	Grabban 17'	Report	(red card) 19' Smith; 62' Powell	Attendance: 5,407; Referee: Malone

25 August 3	Bournemouth	1–1	Preston North End	Dean Court
15:00 BST	Arter (yellow card) 21' (yellow-red card); Elphick 52'	Report	76' Sodje	Attendance: 5,329; Referee: Carl Berry

1 September 4	Sheffield United	5–3	Bournemouth	Bramall Lane
15:00 BST	Flynn 24', 31'; Cofie 43'; Creswell 60'; Blackman 90' (pen.)	Report	20' Elphick; 48' Barnard; 87' Pugh	Attendance: 18,790; Referee: Miller

8 September 5	Yeovil Town	0–1	Bournemouth	Huish Park
15:00 BST		Report	35' Hughes	Attendance: 5,238; Referee: Williamson

15 September 6	Bournemouth	1–1	Hartlepool United	Dean Court
15:00 BST	Tubbs 90'	Report	76' (pen.) Walton	Attendance: 5,308; Referee: Graham

18 September 7	Bournemouth	2–2	Brentford	Dean Court
19:45 BST	Tubbs 17'; Daniels 25' (pen.)		10' (o.g.) Francis; 68' Forrester	Attendance: 5,117; Referee: Langford

22 September 8	Swindon Town	4–0	Bournemouth	County Ground
15:00 BST	Ritchie 12', 67'; Williams 25'; Rooney 85'			Attendance: 8,533; Referee: Woolmer

29 September 9	Bournemouth	1–2	Walsall	Dean Court
15:00 BST	Daniels 82'		41' Butler; 90' Bowerman	Attendance: 4,951; Referee: Bates

3 October 10	Crawley Town	3–1	Bournemouth	Broadfield Stadium
19:45 BST	Akpan 31'; Walsh 45'; Adams 62'		52' Barnard	Attendance: 2,928; Referee: Andy Davies

6 October 11	Coventry City	1–0	Bournemouth	Ricoh Arena
15:00 BST	Goldrick 61'			Attendance: 10,458; Referee: Adcock

13 October 12	Bournemouth	2–0	Leyton Orient	Dean Court
15:00 BST	Grabban 65'; Pugh 67'			Attendance: 5,715; Referee: Steve Martin

20 October 13	Bournemouth	3–1	Tranmere Rovers	Dean Court
15:00 BST	Gibson 53' (o.g.); Arter 58'; Francis 72'		39' Jervis	Attendance: 6,233; Referee: Phillips

23 October 14	Notts County	3–3	Bournemouth	Meadow Lane
19:45 BST	J Hughes 21'; Arquin 32'; Campbell-Ryce 84' (pen.)		51' McQuoid; 60' Arter; 85' Tubbs	Attendance: 4,584; Referee: Lewis

27 October 15	Carlisle United	2–4	Bournemouth	Brunton Park
15:00 BST	Noble 18'; Symington 76'		8', 31' Pugh; 51' Grabban; 61' Barnard	Attendance: 4,050; Referee: Coote

6 November 16	Bournemouth	2–1	Shrewsbury Town	Dean Court
19:45 GMT	Daniels 3'; McQuoid 6'		14' (pen.) Richards	Attendance: 5,022; Referee: Kettle

10 November 17	Doncaster Rovers	0–1	Bournemouth	Keepmoat Stadium
15:00 GMT			38' Arter	Attendance: 5,951; Referee: Bond

17 November 18	Bournemouth	4–1	Oldham Athletic	Dean Court
15:00 GMT	Grabban 53', 54', 72'; Daniels 81'		86' Smith	Attendance: 6,118; Referee: Rushton

20 November 19	Bournemouth	1–1	Stevenage	Dean Court
19:45 GMT	Tubbs 74'		27' Tansey	Attendance: 5,504; Referee: Robinson

24 November 20	Bury	2–2	Bournemouth	Gigg Lane
15:00 GMT	Hewitt 14'; Worrall 78'		59' Grabban; 90' Pitman	Attendance: 2,541; Referee: Boyeson

8 December 21	Scunthorpe United	1–2	Bournemouth	Glanford Park
15:00 GMT	Hawley 64' (pen.)		27' Grabban; 30' Fogden	Attendance: 2,875; Referee: Duncan

15 December 22	Bournemouth	1–0	Colchester United	Dean Court
15:00 GMT	Grabban 41'			Attendance: 6,145; Referee: Malone

22 December	Crewe Alexandra	P–P	Bournemouth	Alexandra Stadium
15:00 GMT

26 December 23	Bournemouth	3–0	Yeovil Town	Dean Court
15:00 GMT	Grabban 32'; Arter 73'; Pitman 86' (pen.)			Attendance: 8,016; Referee: Scott

29 December 24	Bournemouth	3–0	Crawley Town	Dean Court
15:00 GMT	Alexander 16' (o.g.); Pitman 40'; O'Kane 84'			Attendance: 7,855; Referee: Probert

1 January 25	Brentford	0–0	Bournemouth	Griffin Park
15:00 GMT				Attendance: 8,059; Referee: Robinson

12 January 26	Bournemouth	1–1	Swindon Town	Dean Court
15:00 GMT	Arter 26'		85' Williams	Attendance: 8,777; Referee: Phil Gibbs

19 January 27	Walsall	3–1	Bournemouth	Bescot Stadium
15:00 GMT	Mantom 27'; Grigg 45' (pen.), 79' (pen.); Brandy (yellow card) 53' (yellow-red card) 73'		49' Pitman	Attendance: 3,173; Referee: Andy Davies

19 January 28	Hartlepool United	1–2	Bournemouth	Victoria Park
15:00 GMT	Baldwin 51'		28' McQuoid; 63' (pen.) Grabban	Attendance: 2,502; Referee: Russell

26 January 29	Bournemouth	3–1	Crewe Alexandra	Dean Court
15:00 GMT	Pitman 8' (pen.), 67', 82' (pen.)		76' Colclough	Attendance: 8,628; Referee: Williamson

2 February 30	Milton Keynes Dones	0–3	Bournemouth	Stadium:mk
15:00 GMT	Lowe (red card) 44'		9' Grabban; 45' Pugh; 84' Arter	Attendance: 9,233; Referee: Mathieson

9 February 31	Bournemouth	2–0	Portsmouth	Dean Court
15:00 GMT	Grabban 63'; Pugh 77'			Attendance: 9,135; Referee: Marriner

12 February 32	Crewe Alexandra	1–2	Bournemouth	Alexandra Stadium
19:45 GMT	Pogba 79'		59' (pen.), 84' Pitman	Attendance: 4,005; Referee: Clark

16 February 33	Preston North End	2–0	Bournemouth	Deepdale
15:00 GMT	Beavon 19'; Wright 31'			Attendance: 8,889; Referee: Geoff Eltrigham

23 February 34	Bournemouth	0–1	Sheffield United	Dean Court
15:00 GMT			20' Murphy	Attendance: 8,497; Referee: Sutton

26 February 35	Bournemouth	0–2	Coventry City	Dean Court
19:45 GMT			45' Clarke; 84' (pen.) Baker	Attendance: 7,411; Referee: Hooper

2 March 36	Leyton Orient	3–1	Bournemouth	Brisbane Road
15:00 GMT	MacDonald 26', 48'; Lisbie 79'		66' Pitman	Attendance: 5,136; Referee: Lington

9 March 37	Bournemouth	1–2	Doncaster Rovers	Dean Court
15:00 GMT	Tubbs 86'		66' Paynter; 87' Husband	Attendance: 7,178; Referee: Graham

12 March 38	Stevenage	0–1	Bournemouth	Broadhall Way
19:45 GMT	Charles (yellow card) 79' (yellow-red card) 90+2'		38' (pen.) Pitman	Attendance: 2,418; Referee: Collins

16 March 39	Oldham Athletic	0–1	Bournemouth	Boundary Park
15:00 GMT			22' Pitman	Attendance: 3,540; Referee: Hill

23 March 40	Bournemouth	4–1	Bury	Dean Court
15:00 GMT	Pitman 8'; Ritchie 55'; Arter 80'; Tubbs 89'		24' Bishop	Attendance: 7,229; Referee: Sarginson

29 March 41	Colchester United	0–1	Bournemouth	Colchester Community Stadium
15:00 GMT			19' Pitman	Attendance: 4,727; Referee: Langford

1 April 42	Bournemouth	1–0	Scunthorpe United	Dean Court
15:00 GMT	Pitman 11'			Attendance: 7,465; Referee: Ward

6 April 43	Bournemouth	3–1	Notts County	Dean Court
15:00 GMT	Ritchie 17', 85'; Pitman 26'		2' Hughes; (yellow card) 28' (yellow-red card) 45' Boucaud	Attendance: 7,551; Referee: Phillips

13 April 44	Shrewsbury	0–3	Bournemouth	New Meadow
15:00 GMT			5' (pen.), 53' Pitman; 62' (o.g.) Grandison	Attendance: 6,047; Referee: Tierny

20 April 45	Bournemouth	3–1	Carlisle United	Dean Court
15:00 BST	Cook 25'; Arter 56'; Pitman 90'		50' Miller	Attendance: 9,014; Referee: Russell

28 April 46	Tranmere Rovers	0–0	Bournemouth	Prenton Park
15:00 BST				Attendance: 6,745; Referee: Ilderton

=== FA Cup ===
3 November First Round	Bournemouth	4–0	Dagenham & Redbridge	Dean Court
15:00 GMT	McQuoid 30', 79'; Pugh 59'; Fogden 90'			Attendance: 5,827; Referee: Deadman

1 December Second Round	Carlisle United	1–3	Bournemouth	Brunton Park
15:00 GMT	Beck 72'		30' Fogden; 36' O'Kane; 90' Pugh	Attendance: 2,980; Referee: Tierney

5 January Third Round	Wigan Athletic	1–1	Bournemouth	DW Stadium
15:00 GMT	Gómez 70'		41' O'Kane	Attendance: 8,199; Referee: Bobby Madley

15 January Third Round Replay	Bournemouth	0–1	Wigan Athletic	Dean Court
19:45 GMT			18' Boselli	Attendance: Moss; Referee: 8,890

=== League Cup ===
14 August First Round	Oxford United	0–0 (a.e.t.) (5–3 p)	Bournemouth	Kassam Stadium
19:45 BST		Report		Attendance: 3,788; Referee: Darren Drysdale
	Penalties
	Craddock (penalty scored); Smalley (penalty scored); Rigg (penalty scored); Chapman (penalty scored); Batt (penalty scored)		(penalty scored) Daniels; (penalty scored) McDermott; (penalty missed) Pugh; (penalty scored) Grabban

=== League Trophy ===
4 September Southern First Round	Portsmouth	2–2 (a.e.t.) (4–3 p)	Bournemouth	Fratton Park
19:45 BST	Luke Rodgers 45'; Howard 67'	Report	5', 59' MacDonald	Attendance: 5,979; Referee: East
	Penalties
	Howard (penalty scored); Walker (penalty scored); Harris (penalty scored); Rodgers (penalty scored)		(penalty missed) Barnard; (penalty scored) Arter; (penalty scored) Cook; (penalty scored) Grabban; (penalty missed) Pugh

== Statistics ==
As of 28 April 2013

No.	Pos	Nat	Player	Total		League One		FA Cup		League Cup		League Trophy	
No.	Pos	Nat	Player	Apps	Goals	Apps	Goals	Apps	Goals	Apps	Goals	Apps	Goals
1	GK	(England) ENG	Shwan Jalal	23	0	17	0	4	0	1	0	1	0
2	DF	(England) ENG	Simon Francis	49	1	43	1	4	0	1	0	1	0
3	DF	(England) ENG	Steve Cook	39	1	33+1	1	4	0	0	0	1	0
5	DF	(England) ENG	Danny Seaborne (on loan from Southampton)	13	0	13	0	0	0	0	0	0	0
6	MF	(Wales) WAL	Joe Partington	18	0	8+6	0	0+2	0	1	0	0+1	0
7	MF	(England) ENG	Marc Pugh	47	8	39+2	6	3+1	2	1	0	0+1	0
8	MF	(Republic of Ireland) IRL	Harry Arter	43	9	36+2	9	3	0	1	0	1	0
10	FW	(England) ENG	Charlie Sheringham	0	0	0	0	0	0	0	0	0	0
11	DF	(England) ENG	Charlie Daniels	40	4	34+1	4	4	0	1	0	0	0
12	MF	(England) ENG	Wes Fogden	31	3	12+14	1	1+3	2	0	0	1	0
13	DF	(England) ENG	Tommy Elphick	40	2	35	2	4	0	0	0	1	0
15	DF	(Republic of Ireland) IRL	Marcos Painter (on loan from Brighton & Hove Albion)	2	0	2	0	0	0	0	0	0	0
16	MF	(Wales) WAL	Shaun MacDonald	32	2	19+10	0	2	0	0	0	1	2
17	FW	(Northern Ireland) NIR	Josh McQuoid	39	5	21+13	3	3+1	2	0	0	1	0
18	FW	(England) ENG	Matt Tubbs	35	6	6+25	6	2+1	0	1	0	0	0
19	DF	(England) ENG	Stephen Purches	0	0	0	0	0	0	0	0	0	0
20	MF	(Scotland) SCO	Ryan Fraser	5	0	0+5	0	0	0	0	0	0	0
21	GK	(England) ENG	Ryan Allsop	11	0	11	0	0	0	0	0	0	0
22	FW	(England) ENG	Lewis Grabban	48	13	40+3	13	3	0	1	0	1	0
23	MF	(Republic of Ireland) IRL	Donal McDermott	8	0	2+4	0	0+1	0	0+1	0	0+0	0
24	DF	(England) ENG	Miles Addison	22	0	20	0	0	0	1	0	1	0
25	GK	(England) ENG	Darryl Flahavan	0	0	0	0	0	0	0	0	0	0
26	MF	(Scotland) SCO	Richard Hughes	25	1	7+15	1	2	0	0	0	1	0
30	MF	(England) ENG	Matt Ritchie	18	3	16+2	3	0	0	0	0	0	0
32	MF	(Republic of Ireland) IRL	Eunan O'Kane	42	3	34+4	1	3+1	2	0	0	0	0
33	FW	(England) ENG	Steve Fletcher	12	0	0+11	0	0+1	0	0	0	0	0
34	GK	(England) ENG	David James	19	0	19	0	0	0	0	0	0	0
35	MF	(Scotland) SCO	Josh Carmichael	3	0	2+1	0	0	0	0	0	0	0
38	MF	(England) ENG	Josh Wakefield	2	0	0+1	0	0	0	0+1	0	0	0
40	FW	Jersey	Brett Pitman	29	20	24+3	20	1+1	0	0	0	0	0
Players who are currently on loan:
4	DF	(Guadeloupe) GLP	Stéphane Zubar (at Bury)	3	0	2+0	0	0+0	0	1+0	0	0+0	0
9	FW	(England) ENG	Wesley Thomas (at Birmingham City)	8	0	3+3	0	1+0	0	1+0	0	0+0	0
14	FW	(Netherlands) NED	Frank Demouge (at Roda JC Kerkrade)	2	0	2+0	0	0+0	0	0+0	0	0+0	0
27	DF	(Wales) WAL	Jonathan Meades (at AFC Wimbledon)	0	0	0+0	0	0+0	0	0+0	0	0+0	0
29	FW	(England) ENG	Jayden Stockley (at Woking)	0	0	0+0	0	0+0	0	0+0	0	0+0	0
Players who have left the club
15	MF	(England) ENG	Steven Gregory	1	0	0+0	0	0+0	0	0+1	0	0+0	0
28	FW	(England) ENG	Lee Barnard (on loan from Southampton)	16	4	15+0	4	0+0	0	0+0	0	0+1	0
30	MF	(Netherlands) NED	Lorenzo Davids	3	0	2+1	0	0+0	0	0+0	0	0+0	0

=== Goalscorers ===
Rank	No.	Pos.	Name	League One	FA Cup	League Trophy	League Trophy	Total
1	40	FW	Brett Pitman	20	0	0	0	20
1	22	FW	Lewis Grabban	13	0	0	0	13
3	7	MF	Marc Pugh	6	2	0	0	8
3	8	MF	Harry Arter	8	0	0	0	8
5	18	FW	Matt Tubbs	6	0	0	0	6
6	17	FW	Josh McQuoid	3	2	0	0	5
7	28	FW	Lee Barnard	4	0	0	0	4
8	11	DF	Charlie Daniels	3	0	0	0	3
8	12	MF	Wes Fogden	1	2	0	0	3
8	30	MF	Matt Ritchie	3	0	0	0	3
8	32	MF	Eunan O'Kane	1	2	0	0	3
12	13	DF	Tommy Elphick	2	0	0	0	2
12	16	MF	Shaun MacDonald	0	0	0	2	2
12	Own Goal			2	0	0	0	2
16	2	DF	Simon Francis	1	0	0	0	1
16	3	DF	Steve Cook	1	0	0	0	1
16	26	MF	Richard Hughes	1	0	0	0	1
Total				73	8	0	2	83

=== Disciplinary record ===
No.	Pos.	Name	League One		FA Cup		League Cup		League Trophy		Total	
No.	Pos.	Name	Booked	Sent off (straight red)	Booked	Sent off (straight red)	Booked	Sent off (straight red)	Booked	Sent off (straight red)	Booked	Sent off (straight red)
2	DF	Simon Francis	5	0	0	0	1	0	0	0	6	0
3	DF	Steve Cook	2	0	0	0	0	0	0	0	2	0
4	DF	Stéphane Zubar	1	0	0	0	0	0	0	0	1	0
5	DF	Danny Seaborne	1	0	0	0	0	0	0	0	1	0
6	MF	Joe Partington	3	0	0	0	0	0	0	0	3	0
7	MF	Marc Pugh	3	0	1	0	0	0	0	0	4	0
8	MF	Harry Arter	12	1	1	0	0	0	0	0	13	1
9	FW	Wes Thomas	1	0	0	0	0	0	0	0	1	0
11	DF	Charlie Daniels	5	0	0	0	0	0	0	0	5	0
12	MF	Wes Fogden	1	0	0	0	0	0	1	0	2	0
13	DF	Tommy Elphick	3	0	0	0	0	0	0	0	3	0
16	MF	Shaun MacDonald	1	0	0	0	0	0	0	0	1	0
17	FW	Josh McQuoid	0	0	1	0	0	0	0	0	1	0
18	FW	Matt Tubbs	1	0	0	0	0	0	0	0	1	0
22	FW	Lewis Grabban	1	0	0	0	0	0	0	0	1	0
23	MF	Donal McDermott	1	0	0	0	1	0	0	0	2	0
24	DF	Miles Addison	4	0	0	0	0	0	0	0	4	0
26	MF	Richard Hughes	3	0	0	0	0	0	1	0	4	0
28	FW	Lee Barnard	0	0	0	0	0	0	0	0	1	0
30	MF	Matt Ritchie	3	0	0	0	0	0	0	0	3	0'
32	MF	Eunan O'Kane	4	0	0	0	0	0	0	0	4	0
34	GK	David James	1	0	0	0	0	0	0	0	1	0
40	FW	Brett Pitman	4	0	0	0	0	0	0	0	4	0
Total			60	1	3	0	2	0	0	0	67	1

== Transfers ==
=== In ===
No.	Pos.	Nat.	Name	Age	EU	Moving from	Type	Transfer window	Ends	Transfer fee	Source
17	FW	(Northern Ireland)	Josh McQuoid	22	EU	Millwall	Player plus Cash	Summer	2015	Exchange	
22	FW	(England)	Lewis Grabban	24	EU	Rotherham United	Transfer	Summer	Undisclosed	£300,000	
24	DF	(England)	Miles Addison	23	EU	Derby County	Transfer	Summer	2015	Nominal	
14	FW	(France)	Frank Demouge	29	EU	Utrecht (Netherlands)	Free Transfer	Summer	2014	Free	
26	MF	(Scotland)	Richard Hughes	33	EU	Portsmouth	Free Transfer	Summer	2014	Free	
27	DF	(Wales)	Jonathan Meades	20	EU	Cardiff City (Wales)	Free Transfer	Summer	Undisclosed	Free	
13	DF	(England)	Tommy Elphick	24	EU	Brighton & Hove Albion	Transfer	Summer	2015	Undisclosed	
37	GK	(Liechtenstein)	Benjamin Büchel	23	EU	USV Eschen/Mauren (Liechtenstein)	Free Transfer	Summer	2013	Free	
30	MF	(Netherlands)	Lorenzo Davids	25	EU	FC Augsburg (Germany)	Free Transfer	Summer	2014	Free	
30	GK	(England)	David James	42	EU	Free agent	Free Transfer	Summer	2013	Free	
40	FW	(Jersey)	Brett Pitman	24	EU	Bristol City	Transfer	Winter	2016	Undisclosed	
	FW	(England)	Harry Cornick	17	EU	Christchurch	Transfer	Winter	2014	Free	
21	GK	(England)	Ryan Allsop	20	EU	Leyton Orient	Free Transfer	Winter	2016	Free	
20	MF	(Scotland)	Ryan Fraser	18	EU	Aberdeen (Scotland)	Transfer	Winter	2016	£400,000	
30	MF	(England)	Matt Ritchie	23	EU	Swindon Town	Transfer	Winter	2016	£500,000	

=== Loans in ===
No.	Pos.	Name	Country	Age	Loan club	Started	Ended	Start source	End source
28	FW	Lee Barnard	(England)	28	Southampton	18 August	4 January		
40	FW	Brett Pitman	(Jersey)	24	Bristol City	20 November	3 January		
5	DF	Danny Seaborne	(England)	39	Southampton	17 January	31 May		
15	DF	Marcos Painter	(England) (Republic of Ireland)	40	Brighton & Hove Albion	15 February	31 May		

Sources: For loan start source see "Start source". For loan end source see "End source".
EU = if holds or not a European Union passport; Country: when 2 flags, 1st flag = country that plays for internationally, 2nd flag = country of birth; No. = number on jersey; P = Position (for position name, pause mouse pointer on abbreviation); Name = Name on jersey (for more extensive name, pause mouse pointer on name); In/Out = In: The player came in on loan, Out: The player went out on loan; Loan club = the club that the player moved on loan to or the club that the player came from on loan; Started = the date when the player's loan started; Ended = the date when the player's loan ended.

=== Out ===
No.	Pos.	Name	Country	Age	Type	Moving to	Transfer window	Transfer fee	Apps	Goals	Source
26	DF	Mathieu Baudry	(France)	24	Out of Contract	Leyton Orient	Summer	Free	13	1	
4	DF	Shaun Cooper	(England)	28	Out of Contract	Crawley Town	Summer	Free	240	10	
28	DF	Warren Cummings	(Scotland)	31	Out of Contract	AFC Wimbledon	Summer	Free	302	0	
	FW	Alex Parsons	(England)	19	Out of Contract		Summer	N/A	0	0	
24	FW	Michael Symes	(England)	28	Out of Contract	Leyton Orient	Summer	Free	43	11	
14	MF	Lyle Taylor	(England)	22	Out of Contract	Falkirk (Scotland)	Summer	Free	34	2	
17	MF	Elliot Ward	(England)	18	Out of Contract	Dorchester Town	Summer	Free	0	0	
5	DF	Adam Barrett	(England)	32	Transfer	Gillingham	Summer	Undisclosed	28	1	
22	DF	Scott Malone	(England)	21	Player plus Cash	Millwall	Summer	£750,000	37	6	
15	MF	Steven Gregory	(England)	25	Contract Terminated	Gillingham	Winter	Free	33	2	

EU = if holds or not a European Union passport; Country: when 2 flags, 1st flag = country that plays for internationally, 2nd flag = country of birth; N = number on jersey; P = Position (for position name, pause mouse pointer on abbreviation); Name = Name on jersey (for more extensive name, pause mouse pointer on name); Age = age on the day of the signing; Moving from = only indicate the club the player was playing before start playing for this club in this season, for the type of the moving see Status column; Moving to = only indicates the club the player is going to play next, for the type of the moving see Status column; Ends = when the player's current contract ends; n/a = Not applicable; Apps = Total number of competitive appearances (including substitute appearances) at the club prior to departure; Goals = Total number of competitive goals scored at the club prior to departure.

=== Loans Out ===
No.	Pos.	Name	Country	Age	Loan club	Started	Ended	Start source	End source
15	MF	Steven Gregory	(England)	25	AFC Wimbledon	13 September	15 December		
27	DF	Jonathan Meades	(Wales)	34	AFC Wimbledon	5 November			
29	FW	Jayden Stockley	(England)	33	Woking	14 November			
38	MF	Josh Wakefield	(England)	19	Dagenham & Redbridge	22 November	3 January		VitalFootball
9	FW	Wes Thomas	(England)	25	Blackpool	22 November	4 January		
20	MF	Mark Molesley	(England)	31	Plymouth Argyle	22 November	3 January		VitalFootball
	FW	Harry Cornick	(England)	17	Christchurch	8 January	31 May		
4	DF	Stéphane Zubar	(Guadeloupe)	26	Bury	24 January	31 May		
14	FW	Frank Demouge	(Netherlands)	30	Roda JC	29 January	31 May		
9	FW	Wes Thomas	(England)	26	Birmingham City	31 January	31 May		

Sources: For loan start source see "Start source". For loan end source see "End source".
EU = if holds or not a European Union passport; Country: when 2 flags, 1st flag = country that plays for internationally, 2nd flag = country of birth; No. = number on jersey; P = Position (for position name, pause mouse pointer on abbreviation); Name = Name on jersey (for more extensive name, pause mouse pointer on name); In/Out = In: The player came in on loan, Out: The player went out on loan; Loan club = the club that the player moved on loan to or the club that the player came from on loan; Started = the date when the player's loan started; Ended = the date when the player's loan ended.
