= 2014–15 AFC Bournemouth season =

Bournemouth
2014–15 season
- Chairman: Jeff Mostyn
- Manager: Eddie Howe
- Stadium: Dean Court
- Championship: 1st (promoted to Premier League)
- FA Cup: Fourth round
- League Cup: Fifth round
- Top goalscorer: League: Callum Wilson (20); All: Callum Wilson (23)
Home colours	Away colours	Third colours

The 2014–15 season was AFC Bournemouth's 2nd season in the Football League Championship following their promotion from Football League One in 2013.

On 25 October 2014 Bournemouth won 8–0 away at St. Andrew's against Birmingham City. It was the first time that the Cherries had ever scored eight goals in a league game (barring a 10–0 win over Northampton Town in September 1939 which was expunged from the records after World War II broke out the next day) and they recorded their biggest winning margin in a league fixture. They won promotion to the Premier League, and promotion to England's top division, for the first time in their history by winning the Championship on 2 May 2015.

== Statistics ==
=== Appearances & goals ===
As of 2 May 2015

No.	Pos	Nat	Player	Total		League		FA Cup		League Cup	
No.	Pos	Nat	Player	Apps	Goals	Apps	Goals	Apps	Goals	Apps	Goals
1	GK	(Northern Ireland) NIR	Lee Camp	13	0	9	0	2	0	2	0
2	DF	(England) ENG	Simon Francis	46	1	42	1	0+1	0	1+2	0
3	DF	(England) ENG	Steve Cook	49	5	46	5	2	0	1	0
4	MF	(England) ENG	Dan Gosling	24	5	1+17	0	1	0	5	5
5	DF	(England) ENG	Tommy Elphick	50	1	46	1	1	0	3	0
6	MF	(England) ENG	Andrew Surman	41	3	40+1	3	0+0	0	0+0	0
7	MF	(England) ENG	Marc Pugh	44	9	35+7	9	0+0	0	2	0
8	MF	(Republic of Ireland) IRL	Harry Arter	47	9	43	9	1	0	0+3	0
9	FW	(South Africa) RSA	Tokelo Rantie	16	2	0+12	2	0+0	0	3+1	0
10	FW	Jersey	Brett Pitman	39	14	18+16	13	0+1	0	3+1	1
11	MF	(England) ENG	Charlie Daniels	43	2	41+1	1	0+0	0	1	1
12	MF	(Wales) WAL	Joe Partington	0	0	0	0	0+0	0	0+0	0
13	FW	(England) ENG	Callum Wilson	50	23	45	20	0+1	1	1+3	2
14	DF	(Republic of Ireland) IRL	Ian Harte	9	0	4	0	2	0	3	0
15	DF	(England) ENG	Adam Smith	36	0	6+23	0	2	0	5	0
16	MF	(Wales) WAL	Shaun MacDonald	10	1	3+2	0	2	1	2+1	0
18	FW	(France) FRA	Yann Kermorgant	42	17	26+12	15	2	2	2	0
19	MF	(England) ENG	Junior Stanislas	20	2	6+7	1	2	1	4+1	0
20	MF	(Scotland) SCO	Ryan Fraser	27	2	6+15	1	2	1	3+1	0
22	DF	(England) ENG	Elliott Ward	3	0	0+2	0	0+0	0	1	0
25	GK	(England) ENG	Darryl Flahavan	2	0	0+1	0	0+0	0	1	0
27	MF	(England) ENG	Sam Matthews	0	0	0+0	0	0+0	0	0+0	0
29	FW	(England) ENG	Jayden Stockley	0	0	0+0	0	0+0	0	0+0	0
30	MF	(Scotland) SCO	Matt Ritchie	51	15	44+2	15	0+2	0	1+2	0
31	GK	(Poland) POL	Artur Boruc (on loan from Southampton)	39	0	37	0	0+0	0	2	0
32	MF	(Republic of Ireland) IRL	Eunan O'Kane	17	1	8+3	0	2	0	4	1
34	MF	(England) ENG	Harry Cornick	1	0	0+0	0	0+1	0	0	0
37	GK	(Liechtenstein) LIE	Benjamin Büchel	0	0	0+0	0	0+0	0	0+0	0
38	DF	(England) ENG	Baily Cargill	6	0	0+0	0	1	0	5	0
49	FW	(Trinidad and Tobago) TTO	Kenwyne Jones (on loan from Cardiff City)	6	1	0+6	1	0	0	0	0
Players currently out on loan:
17	FW	(Northern Ireland) NIR	Josh McQuoid (at Coventry)	0	0	0+0	0	0+0	0	0+0	0
21	MF	(Senegal) SEN	Mohamed Coulibaly (at Port Vale)	0	0	0+0	0	0+0	0	0+0	0
23	GK	(England) ENG	Ryan Allsop (at Coventry)	0	0	0+0	0	0+0	0	0+0	0
24	DF	(England) ENG	Miles Addison (at Blackpool)	0	0	0	0	0+0	0	0+0	0

=== Goalscorers ===
As of 2 May 2015

Rank	No.	Pos.	Name	Championship	FA Cup	League Cup	Total
1	13	FW	Callum Wilson	20	1	2	23
2	18	FW	Yann Kermorgant	15	2	0	17
3	30	MF	Matt Ritchie	15	0	0	15
4	10	FW	Brett Pitman	13	0	1	14
5	7	MF	Marc Pugh	9	0	0	9
5	8	MF	Harry Arter	9	0	0	9
6	3	DF	Steve Cook	5	0	0	5
6	4	MF	Dan Gosling	0	0	5	5
7	6	MF	Andrew Surman	3	0	0	3
8	11	MF	Charlie Daniels	1	0	1	2
8	19	MF	Junior Stanislas	1	1	0	2
8	9	FW	Tokelo Rantie	2	0	0	2
8	20	MF	Ryan Fraser	1	1	0	2
9	49	FW	Kenwyne Jones	1	0	0	1
9	32	MF	Eunan O'Kane	0	0	1	1
9	2	DF	Simon Francis	1	0	0	1
9	16	MF	Shaun MacDonald	0	1	0	1
9	5	DF	Tommy Elphick	1	0	0	1
Own goals				1	0	1	2
Total				98	6	11	115

=== Disciplinary record ===
As of 2 May 2015

No.	Pos.	Name	Championship		FA Cup		League Cup		Total	
No.	Pos.	Name	Yellow card	Red card	Yellow card	Red card	Yellow card	Red card	Yellow card	Red card
1	GK	(Northern Ireland) Lee Camp	0	1	0	0	0	0	0	1
2	DF	(England) Simon Francis	8	1	0	0	1	0	8	1
3	DF	(England) Steve Cook	10	0	0	0	0	0	10	0
4	MF	(England) Dan Gosling	1	0	0	0	0	0	1	0
5	DF	(England) Tommy Elphick	5	0	0	0	0	0	5	0
6	MF	(England) Andrew Surman	4	0	0	0	0	0	4	0
7	MF	(England) Marc Pugh	3	0	0	0	0	0	3	0
8	MF	(Republic of Ireland) Harry Arter	12	0	1	0	0	0	13	0
10	FW	(Jersey) Brett Pitman	3	0	0	0	0	0	3	0
11	MF	(England) Charlie Daniels	4	0	0	0	0	0	4	0
13	FW	(England) Callum Wilson	6	0	0	0	0	0	6	0
14	DF	(Republic of Ireland) Ian Harte	0	0	0	0	1	0	1	0
15	MF	(England) Adam Smith	5	0	1	0	0	0	6	0
18	FW	(France) Yann Kermorgant	4	1	0	0	0	0	4	1
20	MF	(Scotland) Ryan Fraser	3	0	0	0	0	0	3	0
30	MF	(Scotland) Matt Ritchie	6	0	0	0	0	0	6	0
31	GK	(Poland) Artur Boruc	2	0	0	0	0	0	2	0
32	MF	(Republic of Ireland) Eunan O'Kane	0	0	0	0	1	0	1	0
Total			76	3	2	0	3	0	80	3

== Competition ==
=== Pre-season and friendlies ===
11 July 2014	Copenhagen (Denmark)	2–2	Bournemouth	Graz, Austria
18:00 BST	Gíslason 48'; Mussis 49' (pen.)	Report	Ritchie 43'; Bingham 75'	Stadium: Vulkanlandarena

15 July 2014	Eastleigh	0–4	Bournemouth	Eastleigh, England
19:45 BST		Report	Pitman 21'; Francis 23'; Pugh 48'; MacDonald 78'	Stadium: Ten Acres

19 July 2014	Dorchester Town	0–11	Bournemouth	Dorchester, England
15:00 BST		Report	Arter 2'; Kermorgant 13', 26', 31', 48'; Ritchie 14', 20'; Pitman 35', 43'; Wilson 65'; Whitfield 88'	Stadium: The Avenue Stadium

25 July 2014	Bournemouth	0–1	Southampton	Bournemouth, England
19:45 BST		Report	Isgrove 20'	Stadium: Goldsands Stadium; Attendance: 7,421 (including 1,238 Southampton supporters)

29 July 2014	Portsmouth	2–3	Bournemouth	Portsmouth, England
19:45 BST	Dunne 74'; Wallace 83' (pen.)	Report	Rantie 3'; Pitman 22'; Arter 36'	Stadium: Fratton Park

1 August 2014	Bournemouth	3–1	Swansea City (Wales)	Bournemouth, England
19:30 BST	Pugh 28', 45'; Pitman 53' (pen.)	Report	Montero 68'	Stadium: Goldsands Stadium; Attendance: 2,859 (Including 349 Swansea supporters)

2 August 2014	Oxford United	1–4	Bournemouth	Oxford, England
15:00 BST	Rose 22'	Report	Junior Stanislas 19'; Wilson 44', 79' (pen.), 88'	Stadium: Kassam Stadium; Attendance: 1,165 (Including 124 Cherries supporters)

=== Championship ===
==== League table ====
Pos	Team	Pld	W	D	L	GF	GA	GD	Pts	Promotion, qualification or relegation
1	Bournemouth (C, P)	46	26	12	8	98	45	+53	90	Promotion to the Premier League
2	Watford (P)	46	27	8	11	91	50	+41	89	Promotion to the Premier League
3	Norwich City (O, P)	46	25	11	10	88	48	+40	86	Qualification for Championship play-offs
4	Middlesbrough	46	25	10	11	68	37	+31	85	Qualification for Championship play-offs
5	Brentford	46	23	9	14	78	59	+19	78	Qualification for Championship play-offs

Updated to match(es) played on 2 May 2015. Source: Sky Sports
Rules for classification: 1) Points; 2) Goal difference; 3) Number of goals scored
(C) Champions; (O) Play-off winners; (P) Promoted

=== League results summary ===
Overall								Home						Away					
Pld	W	D	L	GF	GA	GD	Pts	W	D	L	GF	GA	GD	W	D	L	GF	GA	GD
46	26	12	8	98	45	+53	90	13	7	3	48	25	+23	13	5	5	50	20	+30

Last updated: 2 May 2015.
Source: Football League

==== Matches ====
Round	1	2	3	4	5	6	7	8	9	10	11	12	13	14	15	16	17	18	19	20	21	22	23	24	25	26	27	28	29	30	31	32	33	34	35	36	37	38	39	40	41	42	43	44	45	46
Ground	A	H	H	A	A	H	H	A	H	A	A	H	H	A	H	A	A	H	H	A	H	A	H	A	H	A	A	H	A	H	H	A	A	H	H	A	H	A	H	A	H	A	A	H	H	A
Result	W	W	L	L	D	D	L	D	W	L	W	W	W	W	W	W	D	D	D	W	W	W	W	W	L	W	L	W	W	D	D	L	L	D	W	W	W	D	W	D	W	W	W	D	W	W
Position	1	1	5	11	11	13	15	15	14	15	11	9	8	4	2	1	2	2	4	3	1	1	1	1	2	1	1	1	1	2	1	3	4	3	4	1	1	3	1	2	1	1	1	2	2	1

A = Away; H = Home; W = Win; D = Draw; L = Loss

The fixtures for the 2014–15 season were announced on 18 June 2014 at 9am.

9 August 2014 1	Huddersfield Town	0–4	Bournemouth	John Smith's Stadium, Huddersfield
15:00	Smithies (yellow card) 76'; Norwood (yellow card) 78'	Report	Pugh 1'; Wilson 32', 64'; Cook (yellow card) 40'; Kermorgant 50'	Attendance: 12,371; Referee: Scott Duncan

16 August 2014 2	Bournemouth	1–0	Brentford	Goldsands Stadium, Bournemouth
15:00	Stanislas 72'; Kermorgant (yellow card) 73'	Report	Tarkowski (yellow card) 37'; Craig (yellow card) 69'; McCormack (yellow card) 87'	Attendance: 10,114; Referee: Gavin Ward

19 August 2014 3	Bournemouth	1–2	Nottingham Forest	Goldsands Stadium, Bournemouth
19:45	Wilson 58'	Report	Assombalonga 67'; Fryatt 72'	Attendance: 10,768; Referee: Kevin Friend

23 August 2014 4	Blackburn Rovers	3–2	Bournemouth	Ewood Park, Blackburn
15:00	Rhodes 13'; Hanley 21'; Gestede 24'	Report	Pitman 81' (pen.); Cook 90'	Attendance: 13,900 (319 away); Referee: Geoff Eltringham

30 August 2014 5	Norwich City	1–1	Bournemouth	Carrow Road, Norwich
15:00	Grabban 15'	Report	Wilson 45+1'	Attendance: 25,814; Referee: Stephen Martin

13 September 2014 6	Bournemouth	1–1	Rotherham United	Goldsands Stadium, Bournemouth
15:00	Cook 60'	Report	Bowery 90+3'	Attendance: 8,480 (including 492 Rotherham supporters); Referee: Graham Horwood

16 September 2014 7	Bournemouth	1–3	Leeds United	Goldsands Stadium, Bournemouth
19:45	Surman 6'	Report	Doukara 67'; Bellusci 82'; Antenucci 89'	Attendance: 9,307 (including 1,390 Leeds supporters); Referee: Andy D'Urso

20 September 2014 8	Watford	1–1	Bournemouth	Vicarage Road, Watford
12:15	Tőzsér (yellow card) 68'; Cathcart 83'; Forestieri (yellow card) 85'	Report	Arter 63' (yellow card) 70'; Cook (yellow card) 67'; Surman (yellow card) 68'; Wilson (yellow card) 87'; Elphick (yellow card) 90+1'	Attendance: 14,320; Referee: Oliver Langford

27 September 2014 9	Bournemouth	2–0	Wigan Athletic	Goldsands Stadium, Bournemouth
15:00	Elphick (yellow card) 29'; Arter (yellow card) 31'; Kermorgant 36'; Francis 70'	Report	Cowie (yellow card) 45+2'	Attendance: 8,754; Referee: Gary Sutton

30 September 2014 10	Derby County	2–0	Bournemouth	Pride Park, Derby
19:45	Hughes 81'; Martin 90+3'	Report	Francis (yellow card) 64'; Camp (red card) 68'	Attendance: 26,725; Referee: Scott Mathieson

4 October 2014 11	Bolton Wanderers	1–2	Bournemouth	Macron Stadium, Bolton
15:00	Mills (yellow card) 30'; Spearing 52'; Herd (yellow card) 79'; Ream (yellow card) 90+3'	Report	Kermorgant (red card) 36'; Boruc (yellow card) 45+5'; Wilson 46', 68'	Attendance: 13,033 (including 390 Cherries supporters); Referee: Andre Marriner

18 October 2014 12	Bournemouth	1–0	Charlton Athletic	Goldsands Stadium, Bournemouth
15:00	Wilson 3'; Daniels (yellow card) 22'	Report	Jackson (yellow card) 34'; Solly (yellow card) 55'; Henderson (yellow card) 57'	Attendance: 10,360; Referee: James Linington

21 October 2014 13	Bournemouth	3–0	Reading	Dean Court, Bournemouth
19:45	Wilson 50'; Pitman 55', 64'	Report		Attendance: 8,899; Referee: Mark Haywood

25 October 2014 14	Birmingham City	0–8	Bournemouth	St. Andrew's, Birmingham
15:00	Edgar (red card) 7'; Novak (yellow card) 11'	Report	Pitman 3'; Cook (yellow card) 29'; Surman (yellow card) 33'; Wilson 35'; Ritchie 40'; Elphick (yellow card) 52'; Arter (yellow card) 55'; Pugh 63', 69', 84'; Rantie 82' (pen.), 86'	Attendance: 13,837; Referee: Keith Hill

1 November 2014 15	Bournemouth	3–2	Brighton & Hove Albion	Dean Court, Bournemouth
17:15	Greer 25' (o.g.); Pugh 38'; Kermorgant 76' (pen.) (yellow card) 90+6'; Cook (yellow card) 84'; Daniels (yellow card) 89'	Report	Colunga 28'; Bennett (yellow card) 41'; Baldock 60'; Forster-Caskey (yellow card) 69'; Teixeira (yellow card) 71'; Calderón (yellow card) 75'; LuaLua (yellow card) 90+7'	Attendance: 10,166; Referee: Keith Stroud

4 November 2014 16	Sheffield Wednesday	0–2	Bournemouth	Hillsborough Stadium, Sheffield
19:45	Drenthe (yellow card) 27' (yellow-red card) 60'; Maguire (yellow card) 66'	Report	Surman 65'; Fraser 69'	Attendance: 16,881; Referee: Mike Dean

8 November 2014 17	Middlesbrough	0–0	Bournemouth	Riverside Stadium, Middlesbrough
15:00	Clayton (yellow card) 35'; Gibson (yellow card) 44'	Report	Francis (yellow card) 30'; Arter (yellow card) 76'; Fraser (yellow card) 90+1'	Attendance: 22,930; Referee: Simon Hooper

22 November 2014 18	Bournemouth	2–2	Ipswich Town	Dean Court, Bournemouth
15:00	Kermorgant 2' (yellow card) 90+8'; Ritchie (yellow card) 52' (goal) 54'	Report	Bishop 50'; Berra (yellow card) 59'; Mings (yellow card) 73'; Murphy 76'; Hyam (yellow card) 86'	Attendance: 11,115; Referee: Michael Bull

29 November 2014 19	Bournemouth	2–2	Millwall	Dean Court, Bournemouth
15:00	Cook 22'; Pitman 25'; Pugh (yellow card) 57'	Report	Upson (yellow card) 37' (goal) 75'; Woolford (yellow card) 39'; Webster (yellow card) 84'; Gueye 88'	Attendance: 10,016; Referee: Andy Davies

6 December 2014 20	Wolverhampton Wanderers	1–2	Bournemouth	Molineux Stadium, Wolverhampton
15:00	Graham 41'; Stearman (yellow card) 47'; Iorfa (yellow card) 54' van La Parra (red card) 59'; McDonald (yellow card) 89'; Doherty (red card) 90+6'	Report	Arter (yellow card) 31' (goal) 73'; Daniels (yellow card) 49'; Ritchie 85'	Attendance: 20,196; Referee: Mike Jones

13 December 2014 21	Bournemouth	5–3	Cardiff City	Dean Court, Bournemouth
15:00	Ritchie 1'; Arter 43'; Pugh 45+2'; Kermorgant 67'; Wilson 89'	Report	Jones 45+1'; Morrison 48', 78'	Attendance: 10,440; Referee: James Adcock

20 December 2014 22	Blackpool	1–6	Bournemouth	Bloomfield Road, Blackpool
15:00	O'Dea (yellow card) 61'; Delfouneso 65'; Davies (yellow card) 68'	Report	Ritchie 18', 59'; Pitman (yellow card) 40' (goal) 67' (pen.); Wilson 42'; Pugh 73'; Arter 76'	Attendance: 10,014; Referee: Andy Madley

26 December 2014 23	Bournemouth	2–0	Fulham	Dean Court, Bournemouth
15:00	Pitman 9' (yellow card) 82'; Gosling (yellow card) 89'; Arter 90+1'	Report	Williams (yellow card) 88'	Attendance: 10,926; Referee: Keith Stroud

28 December 2014 24	Millwall	0–2	Bournemouth	The Den, South Bermondsey
15:00	Shittu (yellow card) 13'; Forde (yellow card) 35'; Wilkinson (yellow card) 45+2'; McDonald (yellow card) 62'; Williams (red card) 80'	Report	Kermorgant 32' (pen.); Surman (yellow card) 34'; Arter 42'; Smith (yellow card) 52'; Wilson (yellow card) 80'	Attendance: 10,407; Referee: David Coote

10 January 2015 25	Bournemouth	1–2	Norwich City	Dean Court, Bournemouth
15:00	Ritchie 18' (yellow card) 62'; Arter (yellow card) 20'; Cook (yellow card) 89'	Report	Olsson (yellow card) 16'; Hooper 36'; Jerome (yellow card) 56' (goal) 80'; Howson (red card) 64'	Attendance: 11,318; Referee: Chris Foy

17 January 2015 26	Rotherham United	0–2	Bournemouth	New York Stadium, Rotherham
15:00	Árnason (yellow card) 58'; Smallwood (yellow card) 64'; Milsom (yellow card) 70'; Hammill (yellow card) 74'	Report	Surman (yellow card) 40'; Elphick 45+2'; Wilson 62'; Daniels (yellow card) 67'	Attendance: 9,157; Referee: Phil Gibbs

20 January 2015 27	Leeds United	1–0	Bournemouth	Elland Road, Leeds
19:45	Cook (yellow card) 15'; Murphy 36'; Byram (yellow card) 84'; Bellusci (red card) 86'	Report	Francis (yellow card) 47'	Attendance: 17,634; Referee: Oliver Langford

30 January 2015 28	Bournemouth	2–0	Watford	Dean Court, Bournemouth
19:45	Cook (yellow card) 28'; Kermorgant 35' (pen.); Arter (yellow card) 39'; Ritchie 57'; Elphick (yellow card) 87'	Report	Angella (red card) 1'	Attendance: 10,904; Referee: Lee Probert

7 February 2015 29	Wigan Athletic	1–3	Bournemouth	DW Stadium, Wigan
15:00	Clarke 60'; McCann (yellow card) 76'; McClean (yellow card) 81'; Taylor (yellow card) 90+3'	Report	Wilson 37', 57'; Kermorgant 41'; Ritchie (yellow card) 68'; Pugh (yellow card) 87'	Attendance: 10,621; Referee: Mark Haywood

10 February 2015 30	Bournemouth	2–2	Derby County	Dean Court, Bournemouth
19:45	Ritchie 12'; Wilson 44'	Report	Ince 30'; Bent 68'; Hughes (yellow card) 85'	Attendance: 11,031; Referee: Mark Clattenburg

14 February 2015 31	Bournemouth	1–1	Huddersfield Town	Dean Court, Bournemouth
15:00	Kermorgant 16'; Arter (yellow card) 58'	Report	Vaughan 65'	Attendance: 10,007; Referee: Gavin Ward

21 February 2015 32	Brentford	3–1	Bournemouth	Griffin Park, Brentford
15:00	Douglas 9'; Pritchard 45+2'; Odubajo (yellow card) 80'; Dallas (yellow card) 86'; Craig (yellow card) 88'; Long 90+3'	Report	Kermorgant (yellow card) 16'; Pugh 30'; Ritchie (yellow card) 35'; Wilson (yellow card) 45+1'; Fraser (yellow card) 67'	Attendance: 11,459; Referee: Mike Dean

25 February 2015 33	Nottingham Forest	2–1	Bournemouth	City Ground, Nottingham
19:45	Lascelles 21'; Lichaj (yellow card) 33'; Lansbury 44'	Report	Surman 3'	Attendance: 20,637; Referee: Nigel Miller

28 February 2015 34	Bournemouth	0–0	Blackburn Rovers	Dean Court, Bournemouth
15:30	Arter (yellow card) 48'	Report		Attendance: 10,196; Referee: Simon Hooper

3 March 2015 35	Bournemouth	2–1	Wolverhampton Wanderers	Dean Court, Bournemouth
19:45	Kermorgant 10', 49' (pen.); Cook (yellow card) 45'; Francis (yellow card) 71'; Pugh (yellow card) 86'; Pitman (yellow card) 90'	Report	Afobe 39'; Stearman (yellow card) 48'	Attendance: 9,851; Referee: James Linington

6 March 2015 36	Fulham	1–5	Bournemouth	Craven Cottage, Fulham
19:45	Smith 66'; Amorebieta (red card) 69'; Fofana (yellow card) 89'	Report	Pitman 29', 61'; Ritchie 37', 71'; Cook 84'	Attendance: 16,317; Referee: Andy Madley

14 March 2015 37	Bournemouth	4–0	Blackpool	Dean Court, Bournemouth
15:00	Pitman 10', 36', 39'; Wilson 49' (pen.); Elphick (yellow card) 54'; Ritchie (yellow card) 77'	Report	Barkhuizen (yellow card) 58'; McMahon (yellow card) 90'	Attendance: 10,013; Referee: Chris Sarginson

17 March 2015 38	Cardiff City	1–1	Bournemouth	Cardiff City Stadium, Cardiff
19:45	Ecuele Manga 62'; Connolly (yellow card) 68'; Fábio (yellow card) 90+4'	Report	Arter 16'; Wilson (yellow card) 73'; Francis (yellow card) 90'	Attendance: 19,819; Referee: Lee Mason

21 March 2015 39	Bournemouth	3–0	Middlesbrough	Dean Court, Bournemouth
12:15	Kermorgant 12' (pen.); Arter 48'; Pitman 74' (pen.)	Report		Attendance: 10,998; Referee: Anthony Taylor

3 April 2015 40	Ipswich Town	1–1	Bournemouth	Portman Road, Ipswich
17:15	Sears 6'; Chambers (yellow card) 24'	Report	Jones 82'; Arter (yellow card) 38'	Attendance: 22,672; Referee: Bobby Madley

6 April 2015 41	Bournemouth	4–2	Birmingham City	Dean Court, Bournemouth
15:00	Cook 39'; Wilson 45+2' (yellow card) 55'; Kermorgant 48' (pen.); Francis (yellow card) 69'; Daniels 74'; Smith (yellow card) 90'	Report	Donaldson 18'; Cotterill 21'; Davis (yellow card) 28'; Grounds (yellow card) 61'; Robinson (red card) 77'	Attendance: 11,084; Referee: Andy Woolmer

10 April 2015 42	Brighton & Hove Albion	0–2	Bournemouth	Falmer Stadium, Brighton
19:45	Dunk (yellow card) 69'; Bennett (yellow card) 90'	Report	Kermorgant 70'; Wilson 81'; Smith (yellow card) 90'	Attendance: 25,919; Referee: Craig Pawson

14 April 2015 43	Reading	0–1	Bournemouth	Madejski Stadium, Reading
20:00	Hector (yellow card) 55'; Pearce (yellow card) 78'	Report	Wilson 4' (yellow card) 55'; Francis (yellow card) 72'; Boruc (yellow card) 90'; Smith (yellow card) 90'	Attendance: 18,917; Referee: Keith Stroud

18 April 2015 44	Bournemouth	2–2	Sheffield Wednesday	Dean Court, Bournemouth
15:00	Cook (yellow card) 31'; Francis (yellow card) 58' (yellow-red card) 79'; Kermorgant 69'; Ritchie 84'	Report	Isgrove (yellow card) 2'; Lee 36'; Hélan (yellow card) 61'; Buxton (yellow card) 75'; Maguire 90+5' (pen.)	Attendance: 11,280; Referee: Paul Tierney

27 April 2015 45	Bournemouth	3–0	Bolton Wanderers	Dean Court, Bournemouth
19:45	Pugh 39'; Ritchie 44'; Wilson 78'; Arter (yellow card) 85'	Report	Dervite (yellow card) 29' (red card) 70'; Ream (yellow card) 68'	Attendance: 10,070; Referee: Simon Hooper

2 May 2015 46	Charlton Athletic	0–3	Bournemouth	The Valley, Charlton
12:15	Johnson (yellow card) 24'; Diarra (yellow card) 42'	Report	Ritchie 10', 85'; Arter 12'; Smith (yellow card) 88'	Attendance: 21,280; Referee: Neil Swarbrick

=== FA Cup ===
3 January 2015 Third round	Rotherham United	1–5	Bournemouth	New York Stadium, Rotherham
15:00	Brindley 10'; Pringle (yellow card) 28'; Smallwood (yellow card) 66'; Frecklington (yellow card) 70'; James (yellow card) 74'	Report	MacDonald 44'; Stanislas 58'; Fraser 63'; Kermorgant 67', 71'; Smith (yellow card) 90'	Attendance: 5,875; Referee: Neil Swarbrick

25 January 2015 Fourth round	Aston Villa	2–1	Bournemouth	Villa Park, Birmingham
15:00	Gil 51'; Hutton (yellow card) 62'; Okore (yellow card) 62'; Weimann 71'; Bacuna (yellow card) 83'	Report	Wilson 90'	Attendance: 27,415; Referee: Mike Dean

=== League Cup ===
The draw for the first round was made on 17 June 2014 at 10am. Bournemouth were drawn away to Exeter City.

12 August 2014 First Round	Exeter City	0–2	Bournemouth	St James Park, Exeter
19:45	Bennett (yellow card) 63'	Report	Bennett 55' (o.g.); Gosling 74'; Arter (yellow card) 85'	Attendance: 2,648; Referee: Andrew Davies

26 August 2014 Second Round	Bournemouth	3–0	Northampton Town	Goldsands Stadium, Bournemouth
19:45	Gosling 21'; Pitman 30'; Wilson 79'	Report		Attendance: 5,250 (including 332 Northampton); Referee: Carl Berry

23 September 2014 Third Round	Cardiff City	0–3	Bournemouth	Cardiff City Stadium, Cardiff
19:45		Report	Gosling 9', 33'; Daniels 22'	Attendance: 6,491; Referee: Andy Madley

28 October 2014 Fourth Round	Bournemouth	2–1	West Bromwich Albion	Goldsands Stadium, Bournemouth
19:45	O'Kane 49'; Wilson 86'	Report	Elphick 85' (o.g.)	Attendance: 11,296; Referee: Paul Tierney

17 December 2014 Quarter-final	Bournemouth	1–3	Liverpool	Goldsands Stadium, Bournemouth
19:45	Gosling 57'	Report	Sterling 20', 51'; Marković 27'	Attendance: 11,347; Referee: Mark Clattenburg

== Transfers ==
=== In ===
No.	Pos.	Nat.	Name	Age	EU	Moving from	Type	Transfer window	Ends	Transfer fee	Source
4	MF	(England)	Dan Gosling	24	EU	Newcastle United	Free Transfer	Summer	2018	Free	
19	MF	(England)	Junior Stanislas	24	EU	Burnley	Free Transfer	Summer	2017	Free	
13	FW	(England)	Callum Wilson	22	EU	Coventry City	Transfer	Summer	2018	Undisclosed	
6	MF	(England)	Andrew Surman	28	EU	Norwich City	Transfer	Summer	2017	Undisclosed	

=== Out ===
No.	Pos.	Nat.	Name	Age	EU	Moving to	Type	Transfer window	Transfer fee	Source
9	FW	(England)	Lewis Grabban	26	EU	Norwich City	Transfer	Summer	Undisclosed	A.F.C Bournemouth
26	MF	(Scotland)	Richard Hughes	34	EU		Retired	Summer	—N/a	Football League
—	GK	(England)	Shwan Jalal	30	EU	Bury	Released	Summer	Free	Football League; VitalFootball
19	MF	(England)	Stephen Purches	34	EU		Retired	Summer	—N/a	Football League
—	FW	(England)	Matt Tubbs	30	EU	Portsmouth	Released	Winter	Free	A.F.C Bournemouth; BBC Sport

EU = if holds or not a European Union passport; Country: when 2 flags, 1st flag = country that plays for internationally, 2nd flag = country of birth; N = number on jersey; P = Position (for position name, pause mouse pointer on abbreviation); Name = Name on jersey (for more extensive name, pause mouse pointer on name); Age = age on the day of the signing; Moving from = only indicate the club the player was playing before start playing for this club in this season, for the type of the moving see Status column; Moving to = only indicates the club the player is going to play next, for the type of the moving see Status column; Ends = when the player's current contract ends; n/a = Not applicable.

=== Loans in ===
No.	Pos.	Name	Country	Age	Loan club	Started	Ended	Start source	End source
31	GK	Artur Boruc	(Poland)	34	Southampton	19 September 2014	30 June 2015	A.F.C Bournemouth; A.F.C Bournemouth	
—	FW	Kenwyne Jones	(Trinidad and Tobago)	30	Cardiff City	26 March 2015	2 May 2015	Cardiff City	

Sources: For loan start source see "Start source". For loan end source see "End source".
EU = if holds or not a European Union passport; Country: when 2 flags, 1st flag = country that plays for internationally, 2nd flag = country of birth; No. = number on jersey; P = Position (for position name, pause mouse pointer on abbreviation); Name = Name on jersey (for more extensive name, pause mouse pointer on name); In/Out = In: The player came in on loan, Out: The player went out on loan; Loan club = the club that the player moved on loan to or the club that the player came from on loan; Started = the date when the player's loan started; Ended = the date when the player's loan ended.

=== Loans out ===
No.	Pos.	Name	Country	Age	Loan club	Started	Ended	Start source	End source
—	FW	Matt Tubbs	(England)	29	AFC Wimbledon	16 June 2014	6 January 2015	A.F.C. Bournemouth; BBC Sport	
23	GK	Ryan Allsop	(England)	22	Coventry City	4 July 2014	20 January 2015	Coventry City F.C	A.F.C Bournemouth
21	MF	Mohamed Coulibaly	(Senegal)	25	Coventry City	4 July 2014	13 November 2014	Coventry City F.C	Coventry City F.C
24	MF	Miles Addison	(England)	25	Scunthorpe United	28 July 2014	8 September 2014	A.F.C. Bournemouth	
17	FW	Josh McQuoid	(Northern Ireland)	24	Coventry City	4 August 2014	20 January 2015	A.F.C. Bournemouth	A.F.C Bournemouth
38	MF	Josh Wakefield	(England)	20	Torquay United	22 August 2014	19 October 2014	BBC Sport; Torquay United F.C	
29	FW	Jayden Stockley	(England)	20	Cambridge United	22 August 2014	9 January 2015	A.F.C. Bournemouth	
—	MF	Aristide Bassele	(England)	20	Welling United	8 September 2014	6 October 2014	Welling United F.C	
40	DF	Stéphane Zubar	(Guadeloupe)	27	Port Vale	29 September 2014	27 October 2014	A.F.C. Bournemouth	
40	DF	Stéphane Zubar	(Guadeloupe)	28	York City	7 November 2014	30 June 2015	BBC Sport; SkySports	
29	FW	Jayden Stockley	(England)	21	Luton Town	7 January 2015	4 February 2015	A.F.C Bournemouth	
38	MF	Josh Wakefield	(England)	21	Bristol Rovers	2 February 2015	7 March 2015	A.F.C Bournemouth	
24	MF	Miles Addison	(England)	26	Blackpool	4 March 2015	1 April 2015	A.F.C. Bournemouth	
—	FW	Josh O'Hanlon	(Republic of Ireland)	19	York City	26 March 2015	30 June 2015	York Press	
21	MF	Mohamed Coulibaly	(Senegal)	26	Port Vale	26 March 2015	30 June 2015	A.F.C. Bournemouth	

Sources: For loan start source see "Start source". For loan end source see "End source".
EU = if holds or not a European Union passport; Country: when 2 flags, 1st flag = country that plays for internationally, 2nd flag = country of birth; No. = number on jersey; P = Position (for position name, pause mouse pointer on abbreviation); Name = Name on jersey (for more extensive name, pause mouse pointer on name); In/Out = In: The player came in on loan, Out: The player went out on loan; Loan club = the club that the player moved on loan to or the club that the player came from on loan; Started = the date when the player's loan started; Ended = the date when the player's loan ended.
