= Josh Wakefield =

English footballer (born 1993)

Personal information
- Full name: Joshua John Christopher Wakefield
- Date of birth: 6 November 1993 (age 33)
- Place of birth: Frimley, England
- Position: Midfielder

Youth career
- 2010–2011: AFC Bournemouth

Senior career*
Years	Team	Apps	(Gls)
2011–2016	AFC Bournemouth	3	(0)
2011	→ Wimborne Town (loan)	1	(0)
2012	→ Hamworthy United (loan)	4	(0)
2012–2013	→ Dagenham & Redbridge (loan)	0	(0)
2013	→ Dorchester Town (loan)	10	(2)
2014	→ Welling United (loan)	18	(1)
2014	→ Torquay United (loan)	10	(1)
2015	→ Bristol Rovers (loan)	0	(0)
2015	→ Yeovil Town (loan)	5	(0)
2016	→ Walsall (loan)	0	(0)
2016–2017	Aldershot Town	17	(0)
2017	Poole Town	5	(0)
2017–2021	Weymouth	123	(9)
2021–2022	Salisbury	47	(4)

International career
2023	Isle of Wight	3	(0)
- * Club domestic league appearances and goals as of 21:22, 20 October 2023 (UTC)

Joshua John Christopher Wakefield (born 6 November 1993) is an English former footballer who played as a midfielder for several non-League clubs and the Isle of Wight national team.

== Club career ==
Wakefield started his career in local football in Shanklin, he then moved to AFC Bournemouth and started a two-year apprenticeship in the summer of 2010. In November 2011, Wakefield joined Wimborne Town along with Billy Maybury on a one-month work experience deal. In January 2012, he was again sent out on loan, joining Hamworthy United. He made his debut for the Hammers in a 4–0 defeat to Moneyfields. In April 2012, Wakefield was offered his first professional contract, on a one-year deal. On 30 April 2012, he was drafted into first team duty, making his debut in a 1–1 draw with Scunthorpe United, coming on as a substitute for Donal McDermott in the second half.

On 18 August 2015, Wakefield joined League Two side Yeovil Town on a one-month loan deal, and made his debut that evening against York City.

On 25 February 2016, Wakefield joined League One side Walsall on loan until the end of the season.

On 24 May 2016 Wakefield was released by Bournemouth.

On 4 August 2016, Wakefield joined National League side Aldershot Town on a one-year deal.

On 21 December 2016, Wakefield was released from Aldershot Town by manager Gary Waddock at the end of his contract in January 2017.

On 23 January 2017, Wakefield signed for National League South side Poole Town.

In July 2017, Wakefield joined Southern League Premier Division club Weymouth on a one-year contract.

After 4 seasons with the club, Wakefield left the club to join Salisbury.

== International career ==
Wakefield represented Isle of Wight at the 2023 Island Games football tournament. He was part of the team that finished fourth in the tournament and he retired from football after the tournament.

== Career statistics ==
As of end of 2022–23 season

Appearances and goals by club, season and competition
Club	Season	League			FA Cup		League Cup		Other		Total	
Club	Season	Division	Apps	Goals	Apps	Goals	Apps	Goals	Apps	Goals	Apps	Goals
AFC Bournemouth	2011–12	League One	2	0	0	0	0	0	0	0	2	0
AFC Bournemouth	2012–13	League One	1	0	0	0	1	0	0	0	2	0
AFC Bournemouth	2013–14	Championship	0	0	0	0	0	0	—		0	0
AFC Bournemouth	2014–15	Championship	0	0	0	0	0	0	—		0	0
AFC Bournemouth	2015–16	Premier League	0	0	0	0	0	0	—		0	0
AFC Bournemouth	Total		3	0	0	0	1	0	0	0	4	0
Dagenham & Redbridge (loan)	2012–13	League Two	0	0	0	0	0	0	0	0	0	0
Dorchester Town (loan)	2013–14	Conference South	10	2	1	0	—		1 (Note: Appearance in FA Trophy)	0	12	2
Welling United (loan)	2013–14	Conference Premier	18	1	0	0	—		0	0	18	1
Torquay United (loan)	2014–15	Conference Premier	10	1	1	0	—		0	0	11	1
Bristol Rovers (loan)	2014–15	Conference Premier	0	0	—		—		0	0	0	0
Yeovil Town (loan)	2015–16	League Two	5	0	0	0	0	0	0	0	5	0
Walsall (loan)	2015–16	League One	0	0	0	0	0	0	0	0	0	0
Aldershot Town	2016–17	National League	17	0	1	0	—		0	0	18	0
Poole Town	2016–17	National League South	5	0	—		—		0	0	5	0
Weymouth	2017–18	SL Premier Division	40	3	1	0	—		5 (Note: One appearance in FA Trophy, three appearances in Southern League Cup, one appearance in Southern League Premier Division play-offs)	0	46	3
Weymouth	2018–19	SL Premier Division South	37	5	2	0	—		7 (Note: Five appearances and one goal in FA Trophy, one appearance in Dorset Senior Cup, one appearance in Southern League Championship match)	1	46	6
Weymouth	2019–20	National League South	30	0	3	1	—		6 (Note: Two appearances in FA Trophy, two appearances and two goals in Dorset Senior Cup, two appearances in National League South play-offs)	2	39	3
Weymouth	2020–21	National League	16	1	0	0	—		1	0	17	1
Weymouth	Total		123	9	6	1	—		19	3	148	13
Salisbury	2021–22	SL Premier Division South	28	3	1	0	—		5 (Note: One appearance in FA Trophy, one appearance in Southern League Cup, three appearances in Wiltshire Premier Shield)	0	34	3
Salisbury	2022–23	SL Premier Division South	19	1	2	0	—		2 (Note: One appearance in FA Trophy, one appearance in Wiltshire Premier Shield)	0	23	1
Salisbury	Total		47	4	3	0	—		7	0	57	4
Career total			228	17	12	1	1	0	27	3	268	21
