= Shaun MacDonald (footballer, born 1988) =

Welsh footballer

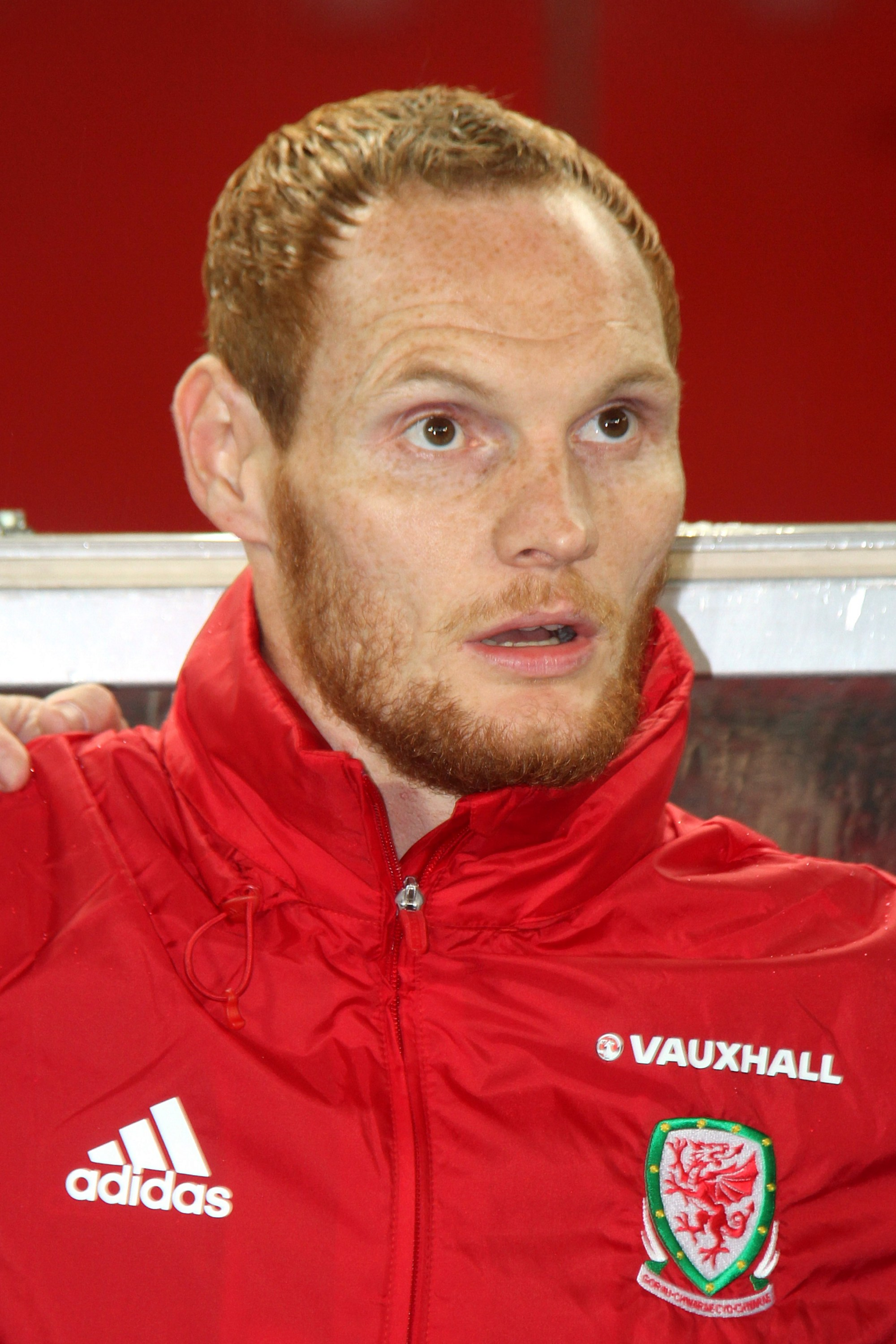
- MacDonald with Wales, 2016

Personal information
- Full name: Shaun Benjamin MacDonald
- Date of birth: 17 June 1988 (age 38)
- Place of birth: Swansea, Wales
- Height: 6 ft 1 in (1.85 m)
- Position: Midfielder

Team information
- Current team: Trefelin
- Number: 5

Youth career
- Swansea City

Senior career*
Years	Team	Apps	(Gls)
2005–2011	Swansea City	24	(0)
2009	→ Yeovil Town (loan)	4	(2)
2009	→ Yeovil Town (loan)	12	(2)
2010	→ Yeovil Town (loan)	19	(1)
2010–2011	→ Yeovil Town (loan)	15	(0)
2011	→ Yeovil Town (loan)	11	(4)
2011–2016	AFC Bournemouth	84	(1)
2016–2019	Wigan Athletic	39	(1)
2019–2021	Rotherham United	32	(0)
2021	Crewe Alexandra	3	(0)
2021–2024	Penybont	50	(1)
2024–	Trefelin	55	(0)

International career
2005–2006	Wales U19	5	(1)
2006–2010	Wales U21	25	(2)
2010–2016	Wales	4	(0)
- * Club domestic league appearances and goals as of 08:39, 8 November 2026 (UTC)

Shaun Benjamin MacDonald (born 17 June 1988) is a Welsh footballer who plays as a midfielder for Cymru Premier club Trefelin.

A product of the Swansea City youth team, he earned four caps for Wales and is the current record caps holder for the Wales Under 21 team with 25 caps. As well as Swansea, MacDonald played club football for Yeovil Town (on loan), AFC Bournemouth, Wigan Athletic, Rotherham United and Crewe Alexandra.

== Club career ==
=== Swansea City ===
MacDonald was born in Swansea, and began his career with his home side Swansea City, making his way up through the youth ranks before being making his first-team debut on 31 August 2005 in a 3–1 defeat to Reading in the League Cup. He went on to make a total of 13 appearances in all competitions during his first season, including playing four times in the Football League Trophy as Swansea went on to win the trophy.

He scored his first goals for the club during the 2008–09 season against Brentford in the League Cup on 12 August 2008, but after making just six appearances during the season, he was allowed to join League One side Yeovil Town on a one-month loan deal on 27 January 2009. On his debut for the side, MacDonald scored the only goal of the game in a 1–0 win over Huddersfield Town, going on to make a total of four appearances before returning to Swansea.

After making just three appearances during the start of the 2009–10 season, MacDonald returned to Yeovil Town on a three-month loan deal on 21 September. MacDonald impressed for Yeovil in his three-month loan spell starting all 12 of Yeovil's league games and grabbing 2 goals.

Once he returned to Swansea, negotiation began with Yeovil regarding a loan deal back at Yeovil until the end of the 2009–10 season. The loan deal was agreed on 31 December 2009.

In late August 2010, MacDonald returned to Yeovil on loan for the fourth time in less than two years until January 2011.

He joined Yeovil on loan for the fifth time on 17 March 2011, until the end of the 2010–11 season. He scored a first half hat-trick on 26 March 2011 in a 5–1 win over Leyton Orient.

=== AFC Bournemouth ===
MacDonald signed for AFC Bournemouth on 25 August 2011, for a fee believed to be in the region of £125,000. He scored his first goal for Bournemouth in a 4–1 Football League Trophy win over Hereford United on 30 August 2011. His first league goal for the club came on 21 April 2012 against Colchester United. He made five league appearances during Bournemouth's 2014–15 season after which they were promoted to the Premier League. MacDonald made his Premier League debut as a substitute against Manchester City on 17 October 2015.

=== Wigan Athletic ===
MacDonald returned to the Championship and signed for newly promoted Wigan Athletic on 13 August 2016. MacDonald scored his first goal for the club in a 1–1 draw against Leeds United on 18 October 2016. He missed all of the 2017-18 campaign after suffering a broken leg in a defeat at Reading in April 2017.

=== Rotherham United ===
On 3 June 2019, following his release from Wigan Athletic, MacDonald signed for League One side Rotherham United on a two-year deal. His time at the club was impacted by illness and injury, with a virus keeping him out of the side for a significant spell during the 2019–20 season, and a broken leg side-lining him for over two months in the middle of the 2020–21 season. On 17 May 2021, Rotherham United published their retained list, and confirmed MacDonald would be leaving the club at the end of his contract.

=== Crewe Alexandra ===
On 24 June 2021, it was announced that MacDonald had agreed to join Crewe Alexandra on a two-year deal. He made his Crewe debut on 7 August 2021, coming on as a second-half substitute in a 1–1 league draw against Cheltenham Town at Gresty Road. However, on 1 September 2021, Crewe confirmed that MacDonald had left the club after making just four appearances, having decided to retire from professional football.

=== Penybont ===
On 23 December 2021, MacDonald came out of retirement to sign for Cymru Premier side Penybont on an 18-month deal.

== International career ==
MacDonald has represented his country at under-19 and Under-21 levels. In June 2009 he was called into the full national squad for the World Cup qualifier in Azerbaijan in Baku. After playing his 22nd game at under-21 level he surpassed the Welsh appearance record previously set by James Thomas.

MacDonald made his full international debut on 12 October 2010 against Switzerland in Basel and earned his second cap against Israel in a 2016 European Championships qualifying match in 2015.

== Career statistics ==
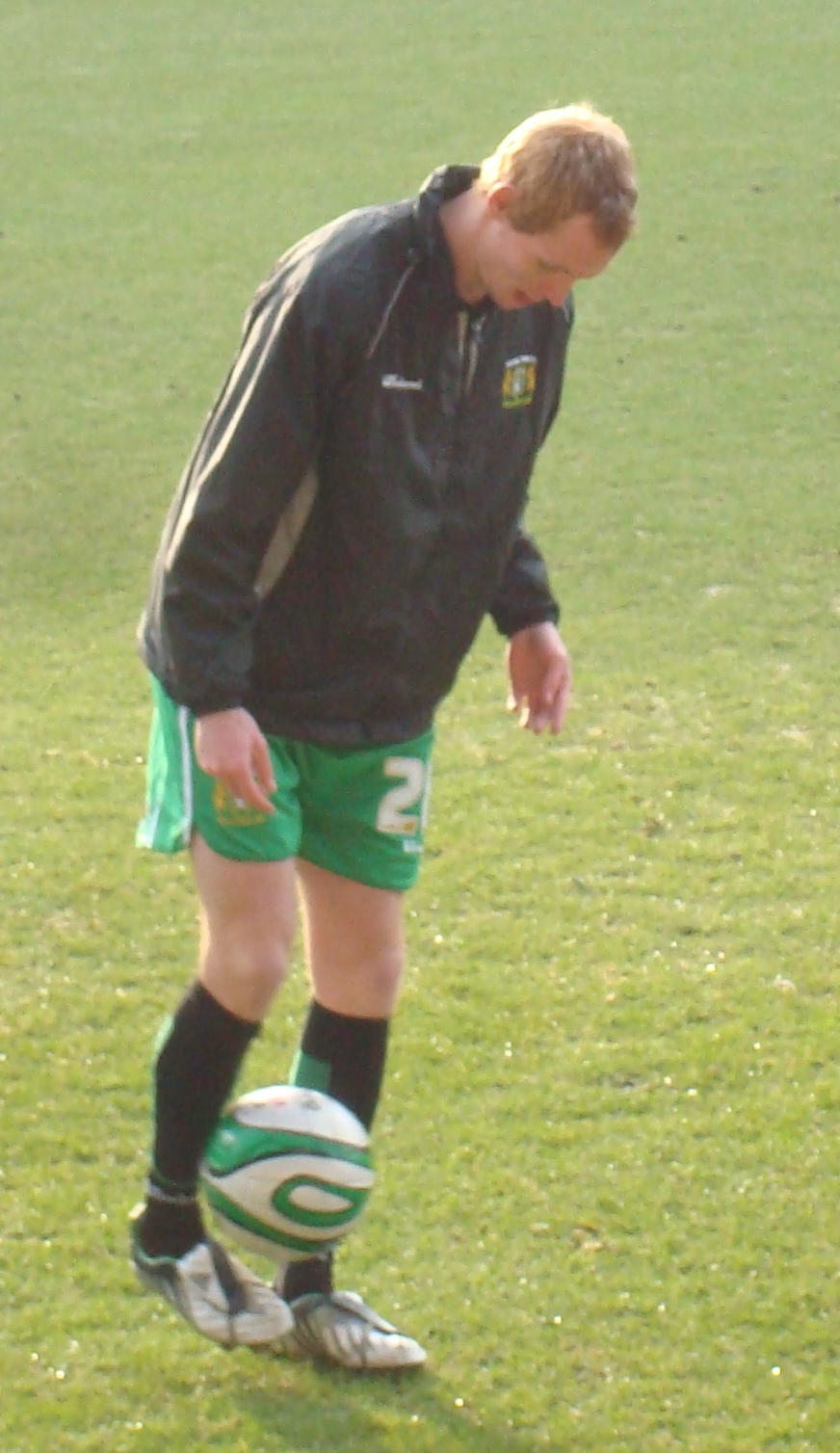
MacDonald warming up for Yeovil Town, 2010

=== Club ===
As of 4 March 2023

Appearances and goals by club, season and competition
Club	Season	League			National Cup (Note: Includes FA Cup, Welsh Cup)		League Cup		Other		Total	
Club	Season	Division	Apps	Goals	Apps	Goals	Apps	Goals	Apps	Goals	Apps	Goals
Swansea City	2005–06	League One	7	0	0	0	1	0	5 (Note: Appearances in Football League Trophy)	0	13	0
Swansea City	2006–07	League One	8	0	2	0	0	0	2	0	12	0
Swansea City	2007–08	League One	1	0	0	0	0	0	2	0	3	0
Swansea City	2008–09	Championship	5	0	1	0	3	2	—		9	2
Swansea City	2009–10	Championship	3	0	0	0	0	0	—		3	0
Swansea City	2010–11	Championship	0	0	0	0	0	0	0	0	0	0
Swansea City	Total		24	0	3	0	4	2	9	0	40	2
Yeovil Town (loan)	2008–09	League One	4	2	0	0	0	0	0	0	4	2
Yeovil Town (loan)	2009–10	League One	31	3	1	0	0	0	0	0	32	3
Yeovil Town (loan)	2010–11	League One	26	4	2	0	0	0	0	0	28	4
Yeovil Town (loan)	Total		61	9	3	0	0	0	0	0	64	9
AFC Bournemouth	2011–12	League One	25	1	0	0	0	0	1	1	26	2
AFC Bournemouth	2012–13	League One	28	0	2	0	0	0	1	2	31	4
AFC Bournemouth	2013–14	Championship	23	0	0	0	2	0	—		25	0
AFC Bournemouth	2014–15	Championship	5	0	2	1	3	0	—		10	1
AFC Bournemouth	2015–16	Premier League	3	0	3	0	3	1	—		9	1
AFC Bournemouth	Total		84	1	7	1	8	1	2	3	101	6
Wigan Athletic	2016–17	Championship	39	1	2	0	0	0	—		41	1
Wigan Athletic	2017–18	League One	0	0	0	0	0	0	0	0	0	0
Wigan Athletic	2018–19	Championship	0	0	1	0	1	0	—		2	0
Wigan Athletic	Total		39	1	3	0	1	0	0	0	43	1
Rotherham United	2019–20	League One	13	0	0	0	2	0	2 (Note: Appearances in EFL Trophy)	0	17	0
Rotherham United	2020–21	Championship	19	0	0	0	1	0	—		20	0
Rotherham United	Total		32	0	0	0	3	0	2	0	37	0
Crewe Alexandra	2021–22	League One	3	0	0	0	1	0	0	0	4	0
Penybont	2021–22	Cymru Premier	9	1	3	1	0	0	1 (Note: Appearance in Scottish Challenge Cup play-offs)	0	13	2
Penybont	2022–23	Cymru Premier	11	0	1	0	0	0	—		12	0
Penybont	Total		20	1	4	1	0	0	1	0	25	2
Career total			263	12	20	2	17	3	14	3	314	20

=== International ===
As of match played 28 March 2016.

Appearances and goals by national team and year
National team	Year	Apps	Goals
Wales	2010	1	0
Wales	2015	2	0
Wales	2016	1	0
Total		4	0

== Honours ==
Swansea City

- Football League Trophy: 2005–06

AFC Bournemouth

- Football League Championship: 2014–15
- Football League One Runners-up: 2011–12
