= Simon Francis (footballer) =

English footballer

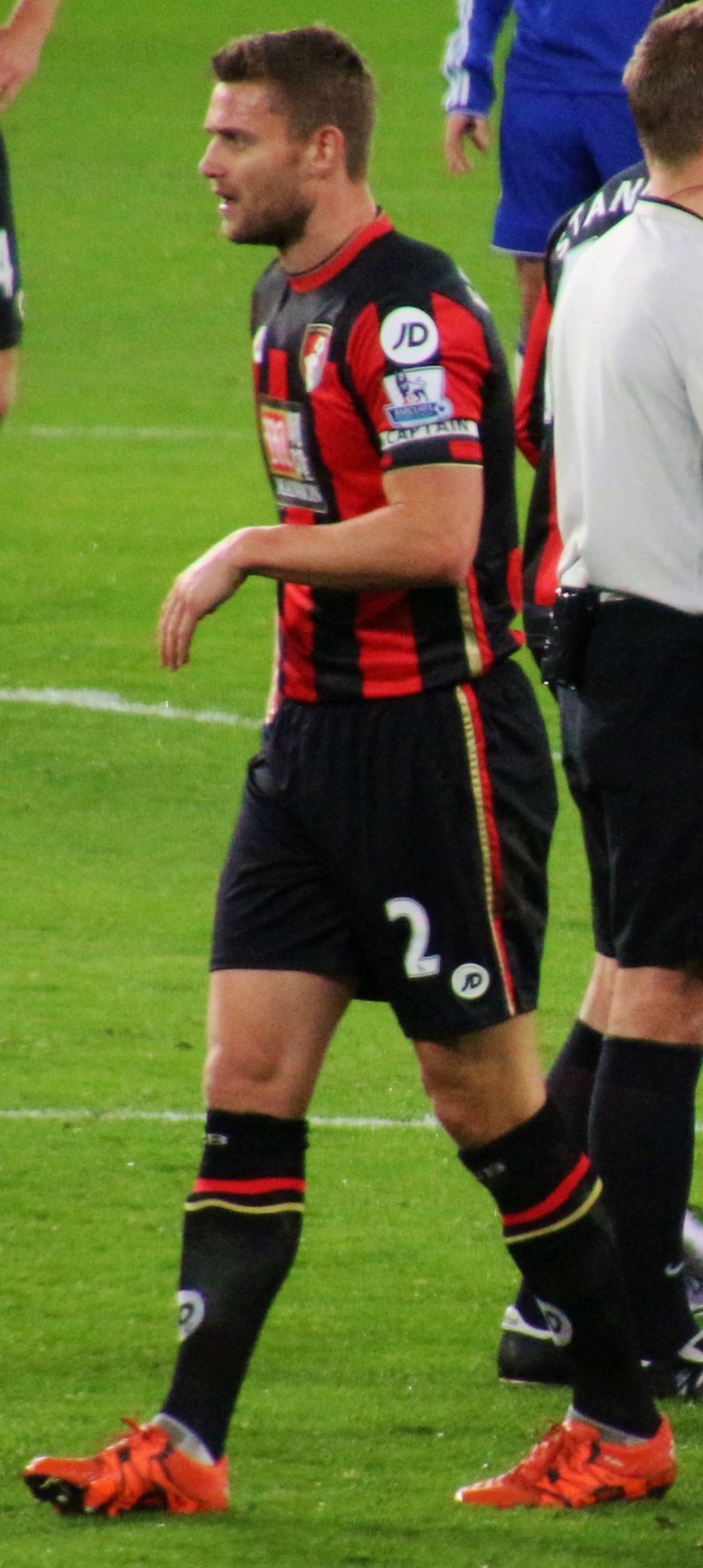
- Francis playing for Bournemouth in 2015

Personal information
- Full name: Simon Charles Francis
- Date of birth: 16 February 1985 (age 41)
- Place of birth: Nottingham, England
- Height: 6 ft 0 in (1.83 m)
- Position: Defender

Youth career
- West Bridgford
- Nottingham Forest
- –2001: Notts County

Senior career*
Years	Team	Apps	(Gls)
2002–2003	Bradford City	55	(1)
2003–2006	Sheffield United	12	(0)
2005	→ Grimsby Town (loan)	5	(0)
2005–2006	→ Tranmere Rovers (loan)	17	(1)
2006–2010	Southend United	157	(4)
2010–2012	Charlton Athletic	34	(0)
2011–2012	→ Bournemouth (loan)	8	(0)
2012–2020	Bournemouth	287	(3)
Total		575	(9)

International career
2003	England U18	3	(0)
2005	England U20	1	(0)
- * Club domestic league appearances and goals

Simon Charles Francis (born 16 February 1985) is an English former professional footballer who was most recently the first-team technical director at Premier League club Bournemouth.

As a player he was a defender who most notably played in the Premier League for Bournemouth, which was the final team he played for. He spent eight years with the club, five of which were in the top flight. Before joining the Cherries, he played for Bradford City, Sheffield United, Southend United and Charlton Athletic, as well as spending loan spells with Grimsby Town and Tranmere Rovers. He earned international caps for both England U18 and England U20.

== Playing career ==
Born in Nottingham and whilst playing for local side West Bridgford Colts Francis was rejected as a youngster by both of the city clubs: Notts County and Nottingham Forest. Instead he joined Bradford City as a trainee in 2002 after being spotted playing for South Nottingham College. He made his debut for Bradford on 16 November 2002 against Nottingham Forest days after he came on as a substitute for England under 18s against France. He made more than 50 starts for the Bantams, scoring his first career goal in a game against Crystal Palace, before being sold for £200,000 by the administrators in 2004. Bradford received offers from Sunderland and Sheffield United, with Francis choosing the latter to be nearer his home in Nottingham and link up with manager Neil Warnock.

Competition for places meant that Francis was never quite able to hold down a regular place at Bramall Lane, restricting him to just 15 appearances for the Blades during his two-year sojourn. He spent most of the 2005–06 season on loan with Grimsby Town and then Tranmere Rovers (where he scored once against Swansea City). His final appearance for Sheffield United was as a late substitute at Luton in the penultimate game of the season.

On 13 June 2006, Francis transferred to newly Promoted EFL Championship side Southend United for an undisclosed fee, signing a three-year contract.

In June 2008, he was initially transfer listed by Southend United after failing to agree a new contract, but two weeks later he signed for another two years with Southend.

In January 2010, Southend accepted an offer for Francis from Peterborough United but he failed to agree personal terms. Following Southend's relegation in to League Two, Francis stated that he had no desire to leave the relegated club. Three weeks later, Southend accepted a £150,000 offer for Francis from Brentford.

On 8 July 2010, new Southend manager Paul Sturrock agreed to cancel the defender's contract, allowing him to find a new club as a free agent. On 30 July, Francis signed for Charlton Athletic.

On 7 November 2011, Francis signed on loan to Bournemouth and the deal was made permanent in January 2012.

Francis was instrumental in Bournemouth's promotion to The Football League Championship in 2012–2013 and won Players' Player of the Season. In Bournemouth's first season in the second tier of English football since 1990, Francis played all but 45-minutes of the season. In the summer of 2014, Francis signed a further contract for three-years at Bournemouth.

On 26 December 2018, Francis suffered a ruptured anterior cruciate ligament of his right knee in a Premier League 0–5 loss to the Tottenham Hotspur.

== Post-playing career ==
Having since retired from professional football, Francis took over a local academy from ex-Bournemouth captain Harry Arter now named Simon Francis Academy.

On 30 June 2021, Francis re-joined Bournemouth in an assistant first-team technical director capacity, supporting Richard Hughes and the recruitment team in identifying and securing transfer targets.

On 5 March 2024, following the announcement of Hughes' departure, Francis' promotion to first-team technical director was confirmed, beginning the role in the summer.

On 4 May 2026, it was announced that Francis would depart his role as first-team technical director at the end of the season, bringing an end to a 15-year association with Bournemouth.

== Career statistics ==
Appearances and goals by club, season and competition
Club	Season	League			FA Cup		League Cup		Other		Total	
Club	Season	Division	Apps	Goals	Apps	Goals	Apps	Goals	Apps	Goals	Apps	Goals
Bradford City	2002–03	First Division	25	1	1	0	0	0	0	0	26	1
Bradford City	2003–04	First Division	30	0	0	0	1	0	0	0	31	0
Bradford City	Total		55	1	1	0	1	0	0	0	57	1
Sheffield United	2003–04	First Division	5	0	0	0	0	0	0	0	5	0
Sheffield United	2004–05	Championship	6	0	1	0	0	0	0	0	7	0
Sheffield United	2005–06	Championship	1	0	0	0	2	0	0	0	3	0
Sheffield United	Total		12	0	1	0	2	0	0	0	15	0
Grimsby Town (loan)	2005–06	League Two	5	0	0	0	0	0	1	0	6	0
Tranmere Rovers (loan)	2005–06	League One	17	1	0	0	0	0	0	0	17	1
Southend United	2006–07	Championship	40	1	0	0	5	0	0	0	45	1
Southend United	2007–08	League One	27	2	4	1	2	0	2	0	35	3
Southend United	2008–09	League One	45	0	4	1	1	0	1	0	51	1
Southend United	2009–10	League One	45	1	1	0	2	0	1	0	49	1
Southend United	Total		157	4	9	2	10	0	4	0	180	6
Charlton Athletic	2010–11	League One	34	0	5	0	1	0	3	0	43	0
Charlton Athletic	2011–12	League One	0	0	0	0	2	0	0	0	2	0
Charlton Athletic	Total		34	0	5	0	3	0	3	0	45	0
Bournemouth	2011–12	League One	29	0	2	0	0	0	0	0	31	0
Bournemouth	2012–13	League One	42	1	4	0	1	0	1	0	48	1
Bournemouth	2013–14	Championship	46	1	2	0	2	0	0	0	50	1
Bournemouth	2014–15	Championship	42	1	1	0	3	0	0	0	46	1
Bournemouth	2015–16	Premier League	38	0	2	0	2	0	0	0	42	0
Bournemouth	2016–17	Premier League	34	0	0	0	1	0	0	0	35	0
Bournemouth	2017–18	Premier League	32	0	0	0	2	0	0	0	34	0
Bournemouth	2018–19	Premier League	17	0	0	0	3	0	0	0	20	0
Bournemouth	2019–20	Premier League	15	0	2	0	1	0	0	0	18	0
Bournemouth	Total		295	3	11	0	14	0	1	0	324	3
Career total			575	9	27	2	30	0	9	0	626	11

== Honours ==
Bournemouth

- Football League Championship: 2014–15

Individual

- PFA Team of the Year: 2012–13 League One, 2014–15 Championship
