= Marc Pugh =

English footballer (born 1987)

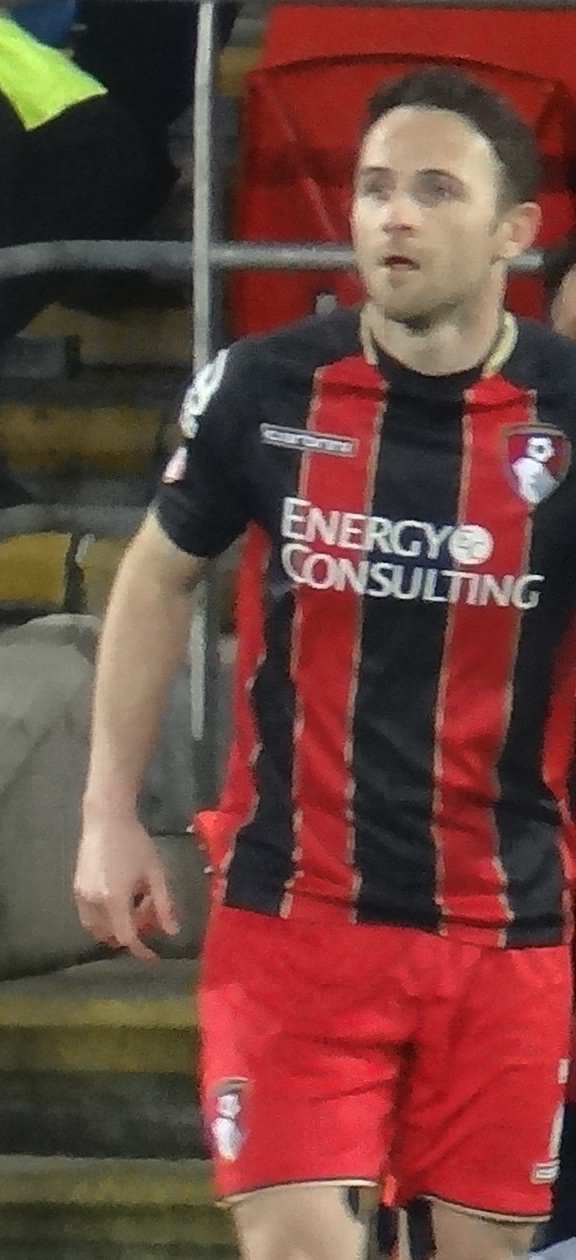
- Pugh playing for AFC Bournemouth in 2015

Personal information
- Full name: Marc Anthony Pugh
- Date of birth: 2 April 1987 (age 39)
- Place of birth: Bacup, England
- Height: 5 ft 11 in (1.80 m)
- Positions: Winger; attacking midfielder

Youth career
- –2004: Burnley

Senior career*
Years	Team	Apps	(Gls)
2004–2006	Burnley	0	(0)
2005	→ Kidderminster Harriers (loan)	5	(1)
2006	→ Kidderminster Harriers (loan)	2	(0)
2006–2007	Bury	41	(4)
2007–2009	Shrewsbury Town	44	(4)
2008	→ Luton Town (loan)	4	(0)
2009	→ Hereford United (loan)	9	(1)
2009–2010	Hereford United	40	(13)
2010–2019	AFC Bournemouth	274	(45)
2019	→ Hull City (loan)	14	(3)
2019–2020	Queens Park Rangers	27	(2)
2020–2021	Shrewsbury Town	8	(1)
2023	Clitheroe	3	(0)
Total		471	(74)
- * Club domestic league appearances and goals as of 17:39, 20 January 2021 (UTC)

Marc Anthony Pugh (born 2 April 1987) is an English former professional footballer who played as a winger or attacking midfielder.

He has played in the English Football League and Premier League for Bury, Shrewsbury Town, Luton Town, Hereford United, AFC Bournemouth and Hull City. Pugh started his career with Burnley, where he progressed through the youth system. He was released by the club having made his first-team debut while on loan at Kidderminster Harriers and signed a short-term contract with Bury in 2006. Pugh later signed a professional contract at the club and after rejecting an extended contract in 2007 he signed for Shrewsbury Town. He was loaned out to Luton Town and Hereford United, joining the latter permanently in 2009.

Pugh left Hereford after one season to sign for Bournemouth in 2010, where he was top scorer in his first two seasons. He has since made over 300 appearances for the club, helping them win promotion to the Championship in 2013 and the Premier League two years later. As a result, Pugh has played and scored in all five of England's nationwide football divisions. After a spell on loan with Hull City, he was released by Bournemouth in 2019 before joining Queens Park Rangers.

== Early and personal life ==
Pugh was born in Bacup, Lancashire, to Tony and Denise. He grew up in Stacksteads and attended All Saints' Catholic High School, Rawtenstall. He is married to Laura, with whom he has two daughters. Pugh is a devout Christian.

== Career ==
=== Burnley ===
Pugh started his career with First Division club Burnley where, at a young age, he started as a Centre of Excellence player, and gradually worked his way up through the ranks to become an apprentice in 2003. As a first year apprentice he played for the youth and reserve teams and due to his great goalscoring record, which led to him being named on the bench for two first-team matches in the League Cup, they decided to keep him on for a third year. As a third year apprentice he scored 15 goals for the club's reserve and youth team. This led to him to being loaned out to Kidderminster Harriers of the Conference National in November 2005 to play first team football. He made his debut for Kidderminster after coming on as an 86th-minute substitute in a 3–1 defeat to Stevenage Borough. He converted a Simon Heslop cross during a match against Dagenham & Redbridge to score his first career goal, which helped Kidderminster to a 3–1 victory. Also, during a match he displayed a smart piece of skill which involved flicking the ball over an opponent's head with his heel, then crossing the ball in for a teammate to score; this move was featured on Soccer AM's showboating section.

He returned to Burnley on 13 December 2005 after picking up a groin injury, but returned to Kidderminster for a second loan spell on 7 January 2006. This spell ended on 26 January 2006 so Pugh could concentrate on his career at Burnley, having made 10 appearances and scored 1 goal while at Kidderminster. He learned that he would not receive a professional contract at Burnley in February 2006, which was partly because both Chris McCann and Kyle Lafferty had both already received professional contracts and they were only second year apprentices.

=== Bury ===
Having just been released from Burnley, Pugh signed for League Two club Bury on a short-term contract on 23 March 2006, following a three-week trial. Bury were entangled in a relegation battle, and Pugh made his debut two days later after coming on as an 80th-minute substitute in a 2–1 home win over Rochdale. He marked his first start for Bury with a goal from 10 yards in a 1–1 away draw with Lincoln City on 15 April 2006, after which manager Chris Casper commented "Mark's a good player and he's got a bright future if he keeps his feet on the ground". He finished the 2005–06 season by playing six matches and scoring one goal for the club. As a result of his good performances, and helped by the fact that Bury had survived relegation in 19th place, Bury manager Chris Casper offered him a new one-year contract at Gigg Lane; his first professional contract.

Pugh was a regular first-team player in 2006–07, playing particularly well in the first half of the season, and was offered an extended contract at the club in January 2007. Pugh rejected this in February 2007, saying he "wanted to keep his options open". Casper revealed his disappointment at this and Pugh later said financial reasons were his motivation to reject a new contract. He was offered renewed contracts throughout the season but still took none of them, which Casper blamed on his agent. Pugh finished 2006–07 with 41 appearances and 4 goals for Bury; they finished in 21st place in League Two.

=== Shrewsbury Town ===
With many clubs interested in his services, Pugh signed for fellow League Two club Shrewsbury Town on 29 May 2007 for a compensation fee. Shrewsbury manager Gary Peters revealed that he had already attempted to sign him earlier in the season as part of a swap deal when striker Glynn Hurst moved to Bury. He made his debut in a 4–0 away win over Lincoln City, setting up Andy Cooke for the third goal with a cross. He suffered an injury in November 2007 and underwent a scan, which was believed to be a cartilage problem. Days after discovering the results of the scan, which revealed he was suffering from acute tendinitis, he returned to training. He scored his first goal for Shrewsbury on his return in a 4–0 home victory over Dagenham & Redbridge, turning in a Marc Tierney cross in the 78th minute before assisting Tierney for Shrewsbury's final goal. He scored a further two goals that season following the arrival of Paul Simpson as manager, and finished 2007–08 with 38 appearances and 4 goals, for a Shrewsbury team that ranked 18th place in League Two.

After struggling to feature in the team at the start of 2008–09, Pugh joined fellow League Two club Luton Town on a one-month loan on 12 September 2008. His debut came in a 3–1 home win over Aldershot Town a day later, after which manager Mick Harford said "He is an out and out winger, and he put in some good crosses. But he hasn't played a lot of football this season and he maybe faded a bit". He returned to Shrewsbury after playing in four matches for Luton. He was loaned out to League One team Hereford United on 26 March 2009, and made his debut two days later in a 1–0 home loss to Huddersfield Town. Pugh scored his first goal for Hereford with an equaliser against Hartlepool United on 4 April 2009, to make the score 2–2, although Hereford eventually lost 4–2. He finished the loan spell with nine appearances and one goal, as Hereford were relegated after finishing bottom of League Two. He was released by Shrewsbury after having the remaining year of his contract cancelled on 26 June 2009.

=== Hereford United ===
Pugh re-joined Hereford on a permanent basis following their relegation into League Two, signing a one-year contract on 30 June 2009. Upon this move, he realised that he "needed to knuckle down and get on the football ladder now, because this could be my last opportunity". He scored twice on his second debut for Hereford, the first from a long-range shot in the 39th minute and the second a 90th-minute equaliser, as they drew 2–2 away to Morecambe on 8 August 2009. Pugh finished 2009–10 as Hereford's top scorer with 13 goals in 46 appearances. His goals were credited with helping stabilise Hereford, as they finished in 16th place in League Two. He left Hereford at the end of the season after rejecting a new two-year contract.

=== AFC Bournemouth ===
==== 2010–2013 ====
Pugh signed for newly promoted League One club AFC Bournemouth on 4 June 2010 on a three-year contract, for a compensation fee. The fee of £100,000, which was decided by a tribunal, was described as "quite excessive" by Bournemouth vice-chairman Jeff Mostyn. Pugh made his debut on 7 August 2010 in a 1–0 away defeat to Charlton Athletic, and his first goal of 2010–11 came after heading in a Liam Feeney cross in a 5–1 home win over Peterborough United on 14 August. He was praised for a "virtuoso performance" by the Bournemouth Daily Echo. Pugh had a strong start to his Bournemouth career, and was leading the club's goalscoring charts with six goals by mid-October 2010. Bournemouth qualified for the League One play-offs with a sixth-place finish, and Pugh played in both legs of their semi-final with Huddersfield. They were eliminated after a 4–2 defeat on penalties, having drawn 4–4 on aggregate over the two legs. Pugh was Bournemouth's top scorer in 2010–11, with 13 goals from 47 appearances.

Pugh was one of Bournemouth's most consistent players as they made an indifferent start to 2011–12, having scored 4 goals from 11 appearances by mid-September 2011. Bournemouth opened contract talks with him in December 2011, and he opted to bide his time over the offer of a new three-and-a-half-year deal to concentrate on his playing performances. Pugh finished 2011–12 as Bournemouth's top scorer for the second season running, with 12 goals from 49 appearances, while they finished in 11th place in League One. He was voted the Bournemouth Daily Echo Supporters' Player of the Year; this newspaper described him as "a rare shining light during an up-and-down campaign". He decided not to sign a new contract with Bournemouth in July 2012, and the club was willing to listen to offers for him.

Pugh remained with Bournemouth for 2012–13, with the club not receiving any offers for him over the summer of 2012. He started the season in indifferent form, much like the rest of the team, and had a brief spell on the bench during September 2012. He described Eddie Howe as a manager who "expects and demands the best" upon his re-appointment at Bournemouth; Pugh scored in the returning manager's first match in charge, a 2–0 home win over Leyton Orient on 13 October 2012. Pugh signed a new three-and-a-half-year contract with the club in November 2012, tying him to the club until the summer of 2016. He cited the return of Howe and Bournemouth's promotion credentials as his reasons for signing a new contract. He established himself as an important player for Bournemouth in 2012–13, as they pushed for promotion. They finished the season with promotion into the Championship as League One runners-up, Pugh having contributed with 8 goals from 46 appearances.

==== 2013–2015 ====
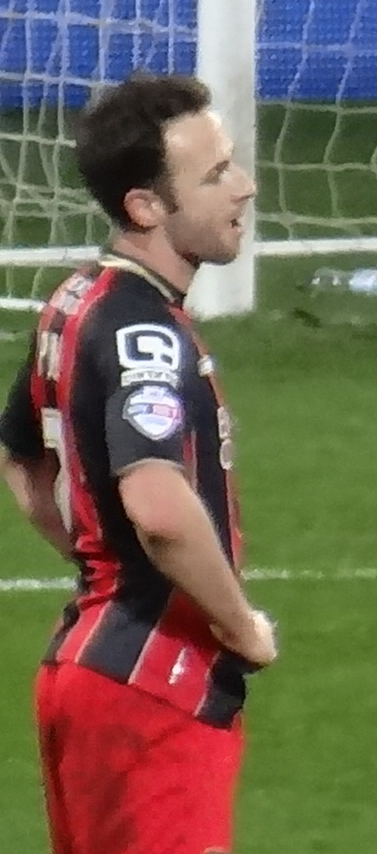
Pugh playing for AFC Bournemouth in 2015

He formed an effective partnership with fellow winger Ryan Fraser as Bournemouth enjoyed their best start to a season in the second tier in 2013–14. In mid-November 2013 Pugh stated his belief that Bournemouth had made a "decent start" to the season; by this point he had scored 4 goals from 16 appearances. He believed his playing intelligence improved by playing against more attack-minded full backs in the Championship, saying that "They are still quick to react and you have got to use your brain a little bit more than in League One. It's developed me as a player because you need to learn how to perform in different situations against different players". Pugh made 45 appearances and scored 5 goals in 2013–14 as Bournemouth finished in 10th place in the Championship, which at the time was the highest league ranking in the club's history.

In Bournemouth's first match of 2014–15, a 4–0 away win over Huddersfield on 9 August 2014, Pugh opened the scoring after only 26 seconds with a composed finish from Matt Ritchie's cross. On 25 October 2014, Pugh played as Bournemouth beat Birmingham City 8–0 away to set a club record win, in which he scored the first hat-trick of his career in the second half. Pugh and full-back Charlie Daniels formed a partnership on the left-hand side of the pitch during 2014–15, the duo starting all matches but one of a 14-match unbeaten run for Bournemouth. He scored the first goal in a 3–0 win over Bolton Wanderers on 27 April 2015 with a left-footed shot into the top corner; this result all but sealed Bournemouth's promotion into the Premier League. He played in a 3–0 away win against Charlton on 2 May 2015, which confirmed promotion and, thanks to Watford drawing their last match, the Championship title. This was the first time Bournemouth had been promoted into the top flight in the club's 125-year history. Pugh was one of Bournemouth's most consistent players in 2014–15, and contributed with 9 goals from 44 matches.

==== 2015–2019 ====
Pugh scored his first Premier League goal in Bournemouth's 4–3 away win over West Ham United on 22 August 2015, with a curling shot past Darren Randolph in the 66th minute. This goal meant he had scored in each of the top five divisions of the English football league system. In November 2015, Pugh signed a new two-and-a-half-year contract with Bournemouth, tying him to the club until the summer of 2018.

Pugh joined Championship club Hull City on 22 January 2019 on loan until the end of the 2018–19 season, having made only three appearances for Bournemouth that season, all in cup competitions. He made his debut on 26 January as 66th-minute substitute in a 3–0 defeat away to Blackburn Rovers when he replaced Kamil Grosicki. Pugh scored his first goal for Hull on 26 February 2019, in a home match against Millwall that City won 2–1. His loan spell was cut short on 25 April 2019 when he returned to Bournemouth with a broken toe, sustained in the match against Sheffield United on 22 April. He was released by Bournemouth at the end of the season.

=== Queens Park Rangers ===
Pugh signed for Championship club Queens Park Rangers on 27 July 2019 on a one-year contract with the option of a further year. Due to the 'economic situation' caused by the COVID-19 pandemic, Pugh's contract was mutually terminated on 13 June 2020.

=== Return to Shrewsbury Town ===
Pugh returned to Shrewsbury Town on 26 October 2020 on a short-term contract lasting until January 2021. He scored his first goal on 24 November, with Shrewsbury's second goal in a 2–2 draw away to Milton Keynes Dons. Pugh left the club on 19 January 2021 alongside Charlie Daniels after the expiry of their contracts.

=== Clitheroe ===
On 20 March 2023, Pugh signed for Northern Premier League Division One West side, Clitheroe.

== Style of play ==
Pugh primarily plays as a winger but can also play as an attacking midfielder. He has been noted for his dribbling skills, particularly his fondness for a Cruyff Turn, and his ability to get past opposition players, and in February 2015 was praised by manager Eddie Howe for adding "real intelligence with his movement".

== Career statistics ==
As of 19 January 2021

Appearances and goals by club, season and competition
Club	Season	League			FA Cup		League Cup		Other		Total	
Club	Season	Division	Apps	Goals	Apps	Goals	Apps	Goals	Apps	Goals	Apps	Goals
Burnley	2003–04	First Division	0	0	0	0	0	0	—		0	0
Burnley	2004–05	Championship	0	0	0	0	0	0	—		0	0
Burnley	2005–06	Championship	0	0	0	0	0	0	—		0	0
Burnley	Total		0	0	0	0	0	0	—		0	0
Kidderminster Harriers (loan)	2005–06	Conference National	7	1	—		—		3 (Note: Two appearances in Football League Trophy, one in FA Trophy)	0	10	1
Bury	2005–06	League Two	6	1	—		—		—		6	1
Bury	2006–07	League Two	35	3	4	1	1	0	1 (Note: Appearances in Football League Trophy)	0	41	4
Bury	Total		41	4	4	1	1	0	1	0	47	5
Shrewsbury Town	2007–08	League Two	37	4	1	0	0	0	0	0	38	4
Shrewsbury Town	2008–09	League Two	7	0	0	0	0	0	1	0	8	0
Shrewsbury Town	Total		44	4	1	0	0	0	1	0	46	4
Luton Town (loan)	2008–09	League Two	4	0	—		—		—		4	0
Hereford United (loan)	2008–09	League One	9	1	—		—		—		9	1
Hereford United	2009–10	League Two	40	13	2	0	1	0	3	0	46	13
Hereford United	Total		49	14	2	0	1	0	3	0	55	14
AFC Bournemouth	2010–11	League One	41	12	2	1	1	0	3 (Note: One appearance in Football League Trophy, two in League One play-offs)	0	47	13
AFC Bournemouth	2011–12	League One	42	8	2	0	2	1	3	3	49	12
AFC Bournemouth	2012–13	League One	40	6	4	2	1	0	1	0	46	8
AFC Bournemouth	2013–14	Championship	42	5	2	0	1	0	—		45	5
AFC Bournemouth	2014–15	Championship	42	9	0	0	2	0	—		44	9
AFC Bournemouth	2015–16	Premier League	26	3	2	1	2	1	—		30	5
AFC Bournemouth	2016–17	Premier League	21	2	1	0	1	0	—		23	2
AFC Bournemouth	2017–18	Premier League	20	0	2	0	3	1	—		25	1
AFC Bournemouth	2018–19	Premier League	0	0	1	1	2	0	—		3	1
AFC Bournemouth	Total		274	45	16	5	15	3	7	3	312	56
Hull City (loan)	2018–19	Championship	14	3	—		—		—		14	3
Queens Park Rangers	2019–20	Championship	27	2	2	0	2	0	—		31	2
Shrewsbury Town	2020–21	League One	8	1	2	0	—		0	0	10	1
Career total			467	74	27	6	19	3	15	3	528	86

== Honours ==
Bournemouth

- Football League Championship: 2014–15
- Football League One runner-up: 2012–13
