= Steve Cook =

English footballer (born 1991)

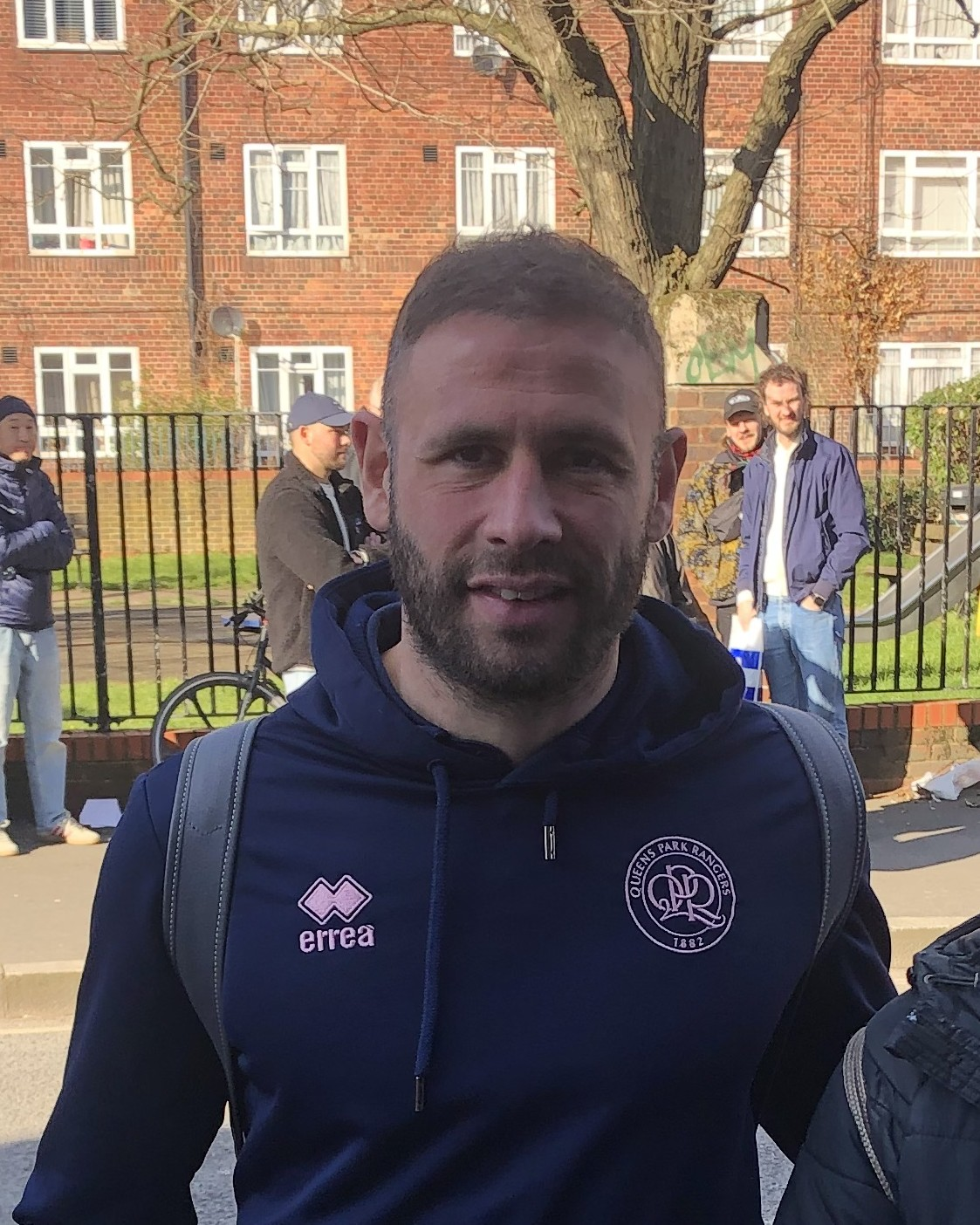
- Cook with Queens Park Rangers in 2025

Personal information
- Full name: Steve Anthony Cook
- Date of birth: 19 April 1991 (age 35)
- Place of birth: Hastings, England
- Height: 6 ft 1 in (1.85 m)
- Position: Centre-back

Team information
- Current team: Wycombe Wanderers
- Number: 27

Youth career
- –2008: Brighton & Hove Albion

Senior career*
Years	Team	Apps	(Gls)
2008–2012	Brighton & Hove Albion	3	(0)
2009	→ Havant & Waterlooville (loan)	5	(0)
2009–2010	→ Eastleigh (loan)	10	(0)
2010	→ Eastbourne Borough (loan)	7	(1)
2010–2011	→ Mansfield Town (loan)	8	(0)
2011	→ Bournemouth (loan)	8	(0)
2012–2022	Bournemouth	356	(19)
2022–2023	Nottingham Forest	26	(0)
2023–2026	Queens Park Rangers	97	(5)
2026–	Wycombe Wanderers	7	(0)
- * Club domestic league appearances and goals as of 11 October 2026

Steve Anthony Cook (born 19 April 1991) is an English professional footballer who plays as a centre-back for League One club Wycombe Wanderers.

== Career ==
=== Brighton & Hove Albion ===
Born in Hastings, East Sussex, Cook made his first-team debut for Brighton & Hove Albion during the League Cup third round victory over Manchester City on 24 September 2008. He made his second substitute appearance for Brighton during a 2–1 FA Cup first round replay defeat against Hartlepool United on 18 November 2008.

On 23 December 2008, Cook joined Conference South team Havant & Waterlooville on loan for six-weeks. When this loan expired, he once again found himself involved in the Brighton first team, making his third substitute appearance for the club during the Football League Trophy Southern Final penalty shoot-out defeat to Luton Town.

Cook made his first league appearance for Brighton during a 4–0 home defeat to Crewe Alexandra on 28 February 2009.

He, along with fellow youth players Steve Brinkhurst and Josh Pelling, signed professional contracts with Brighton on 7 May 2009.

On 20 November 2009, Cook joined Conference South team Eastleigh on loan to gain first-team match experience. He was sent off on his debut in a 1–1 draw with Lewes in the third qualifying round of the FA Trophy on 21 November 2009.

On 16 September 2010, Cook once again went on loan, this time to Conference Premier side Eastbourne Borough where he spent a month. After making seven appearances and scoring once, Eastbourne were keen to extend the loan deal for the player, but were however unsuccessful as he later joined Conference Premier rivals Mansfield Town on a loan deal lasting until January 2011. Brighton manager Gus Poyet later revealed that he felt Cook would add another ingredient to his footballing education by spending time away from Sussex and that it would force him to "grow up".

Cook made his first appearance for Brighton in over two and a half years during the League Cup game against Liverpool in September 2011.

=== AFC Bournemouth ===
==== Initial loan and League One ====
On 27 October 2011, Cook joined League One side AFC Bournemouth on loan. On 3 January 2012, Cook re-joined Bournemouth permanently for £150,000 signing a three-and-a-half-year deal, after making an initial 8 appearances during his loan spell. Cook made a further 18 appearances for the Cherries in the 2011/12 season, as the club finished 11th in League One.

The following season began poorly for Cook and the Cherries, with the club winning just 1 of their first 11 games, languishing bottom of the league, and parting ways with manager Paul Groves on 3 October. Cook appeared in just 8 of the first 20 league games this season, before finally putting together a run of starts for the side, beginning with a 2–1 win against Scunthorpe United on 8 December. Cook and Bournemouth then enjoyed a club-record setting run of 8 consecutive victories, culminating in a 3–1 home win against Carlisle United. Cook scored his first goal of the season in this game, which saw Bournemouth promoted to the Championship. Cook finished the season having made 38 appearances for the club in total across all competitions.

==== Championship & Promotion to the Premier League ====
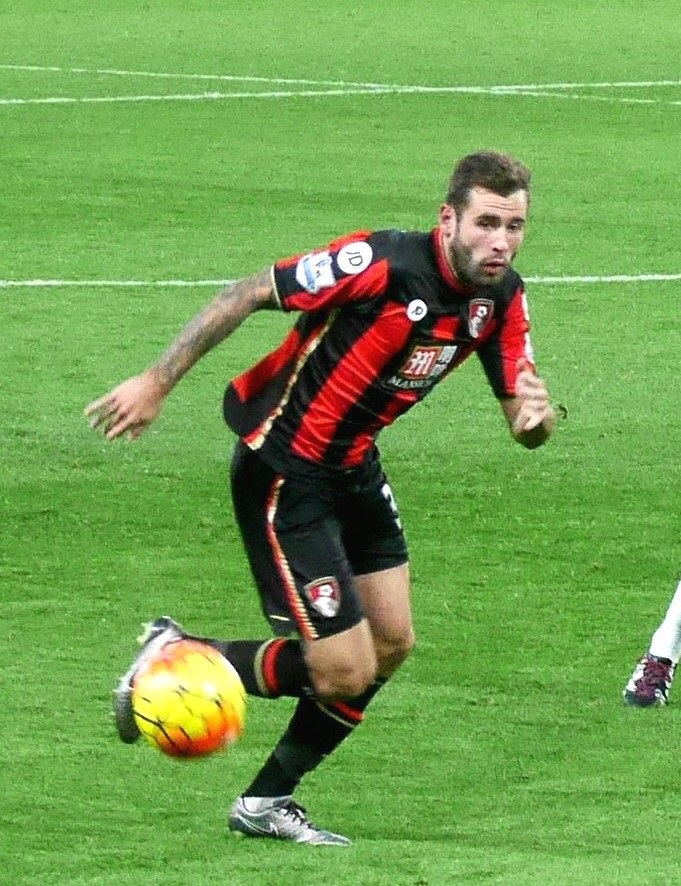
Cook playing for AFC Bournemouth in 2015.

Cook made a decent start to his first season in the Championship with Bournemouth, starting the first 20 league games of the season and being a consistent presence for the club. He scored his first ever Championship goal in a 5–2 home win against Millwall on 5 October. Cook scored his second goal of the season, and the only goal of the game, in a 0–1 away win against Barnsley on 22 March, and he then scored again in a 2–2 draw away to Ipswich on 21 April. Cook finished his first season-proper of Championship football having made 40 appearances for the club in all competitions, as Bournemouth recorded their highest ever league finish of 10th.

The 2014–15 season started well for Cook, playing in and keeping a clean sheet in the 0–4 opening day win away at Huddersfield Town. Cook went on to score in the games against Blackburn and Rotherham on 23 August and 13 September respectively. Bournemouth went on an impressive run of 14 games unbeaten, a period in which Cook played every single minute, beginning with a 1–2 away win at Bolton on 4 October and ending with a 1–2 home defeat to Norwich City on 10 January. Within this period Cook played in the Cherries 0–8 away win against Birmingham City; which is Bournemouth's highest ever league win.

The Cherries would then go on another undefeated streak, which would last until the end of the season, starting with a 0–0 home draw against Blackburn. Cook scored his fourth goal of the season, a screamer against Fulham in a 1–5 away win that lifted the Cherries into first on goal difference, on 6 March. Cook started in and played the full 90 minutes in the pivotal home game against Bolton on 27 April. With the Cherries far superior goal difference to third placed Middlesbrough FC, a win in the penultimate game would all but confirm the club's promotion to the Premier League; Bournemouth went on to seal an impressive 3–0 win to do just that. Cook repeated the trick with the Cherries by playing the full 90 minutes once more in the final game of the season against Charlton, a 0–3 away win that secured not just the promotion, but the Championship title as well, with Watford failing to beat Sheffield Wednesday in their final game. Cook was ever-present in the 2014–15 season, playing in all 46 games and scoring 4 goals as Bournemouth won the Championship and were promoted to the Premier League.

==== Premier League years ====
On 4 December 2016, he scored to equalise and then created the winning goal as Bournemouth completed one of the comebacks of the season to beat Liverpool for the first time in their history 4–3 in a sensational Premier League game. He made his 300th appearance for the Cherries in February 2019.

=== Nottingham Forest ===
On 4 January 2022, Cook moved to Championship side Nottingham Forest on a two-and-a-half-year contract for an undisclosed fee.

In May 2022, Cook won promotion with Nottingham Forest to the Premier League via the playoffs, beating Huddersfield Town 1-0 in the final as Cook played the full 90 minutes. In the playoff 2nd leg Cook scored a penalty in the shootout against Sheffield United to put Forest 3-1 on penalties at the time.

Cook went on to make 14 appearances in all competitions during the 2022-23 season, playing his part to help Forest secure Premier League survival.

=== Queens Park Rangers ===
On 9 August 2023, Cook signed for Championship club Queens Park Rangers on a two-year contract for an undisclosed fee. Cook was voted the club's Player of the Year in his first season at the club, his defensive performance being a key factor in the club's upturn in form following the appointment of Martí Cifuentes.

On 18th September 2025 He was named as the 1176th player to play for Queens Park Rangers with his debut on 12/08/2023

On 12 May 2025, the club announced it had activated an extension clause in the player's contract. On 20 April 2026 the club announced Cook would be leaving in the summer once his contract expired.

=== Wycombe Wanderers ===
On 3 July 2026, Cook signed for Wycombe Wanderers on a free transfer.

== Personal life ==
On 23 June 2022, Cook was announced to have taken majority ownership of eleventh tier side Westfield, based just north of Cook's birthplace of Hastings.

== Career statistics ==
As of match played 2 May 2026

Appearances and goals by club, season and competition
Club	Season	League			FA Cup		League Cup		Other		Total	
Club	Season	Division	Apps	Goals	Apps	Goals	Apps	Goals	Apps	Goals	Apps	Goals
Brighton & Hove Albion	2008–09	League One	2	0	1	0	1	0	1 (Note: Appearance in Football League Trophy)	0	5	0
Brighton & Hove Albion	2011–12	Championship	1	0	0	0	1	0	—		2	0
Brighton & Hove Albion	Total		3	0	1	0	2	0	1	0	7	0
Havant & Waterlooville (loan)	2008–09	Conference South	5	0	0	0	—		3 (Note: Appearances in FA Trophy)	0	8	0
Eastleigh (loan)	2009–10	Conference South	10	0	0	0	—		2	0	12	0
Eastbourne Borough (loan)	2010–11	Conference Premier	7	1	0	0	—		0	0	7	1
Mansfield Town (loan)	2010–11	Conference Premier	8	0	2	0	—		1	0	11	0
AFC Bournemouth (loan)	2011–12	League One	8	0	0	0	—		1	0	9	0
AFC Bournemouth	2011–12	League One	18	0	0	0	0	0	0	0	18	0
AFC Bournemouth	2012–13	League One	33	1	4	0	0	0	1	0	38	1
AFC Bournemouth	2013–14	Championship	38	3	1	0	1	0	—		40	3
AFC Bournemouth	2014–15	Championship	46	5	2	0	1	0	—		49	5
AFC Bournemouth	2015–16	Premier League	36	4	1	0	1	0	—		38	4
AFC Bournemouth	2016–17	Premier League	38	2	1	0	0	0	—		39	2
AFC Bournemouth	2017–18	Premier League	34	2	2	1	4	0	—		40	3
AFC Bournemouth	2018–19	Premier League	31	1	1	0	3	1	—		35	2
AFC Bournemouth	2019–20	Premier League	29	1	2	0	0	0	—		31	1
AFC Bournemouth	2020–21	Championship	42	0	3	0	1	0	1 (Note: Appearances in the Championship play-offs)	0	47	0
AFC Bournemouth	2021–22	Championship	3	0	0	0	1	0	—		4	0
AFC Bournemouth	Total		356	19	17	1	12	1	3	0	388	21
Nottingham Forest	2021–22	Championship	14	0	3	0	—		3	0	20	0
Nottingham Forest	2022–23	Premier League	12	0	1	0	1	0	—		14	0
Nottingham Forest	Total		26	0	4	0	1	0	3	0	34	0
Queens Park Rangers	2023–24	Championship	36	2	0	0	0	0	—		36	2
Queens Park Rangers	2024–25	Championship	31	2	0	0	2	0	—		33	2
Queens Park Rangers	2025–26	Championship	30	1	1	0	0	0	—		31	1
Queens Park Rangers	Total		97	5	1	0	2	0	—		100	5
Career total			482	24	25	1	17	1	13	0	537	26

== Honours ==
Bournemouth

- Football League Championship: 2014–15

Nottingham Forest

- EFL Championship play-offs: 2022

Individual

- Queens Park Rangers Player of the Year: 2023–24
