= Frank Demouge =

Dutch footballer

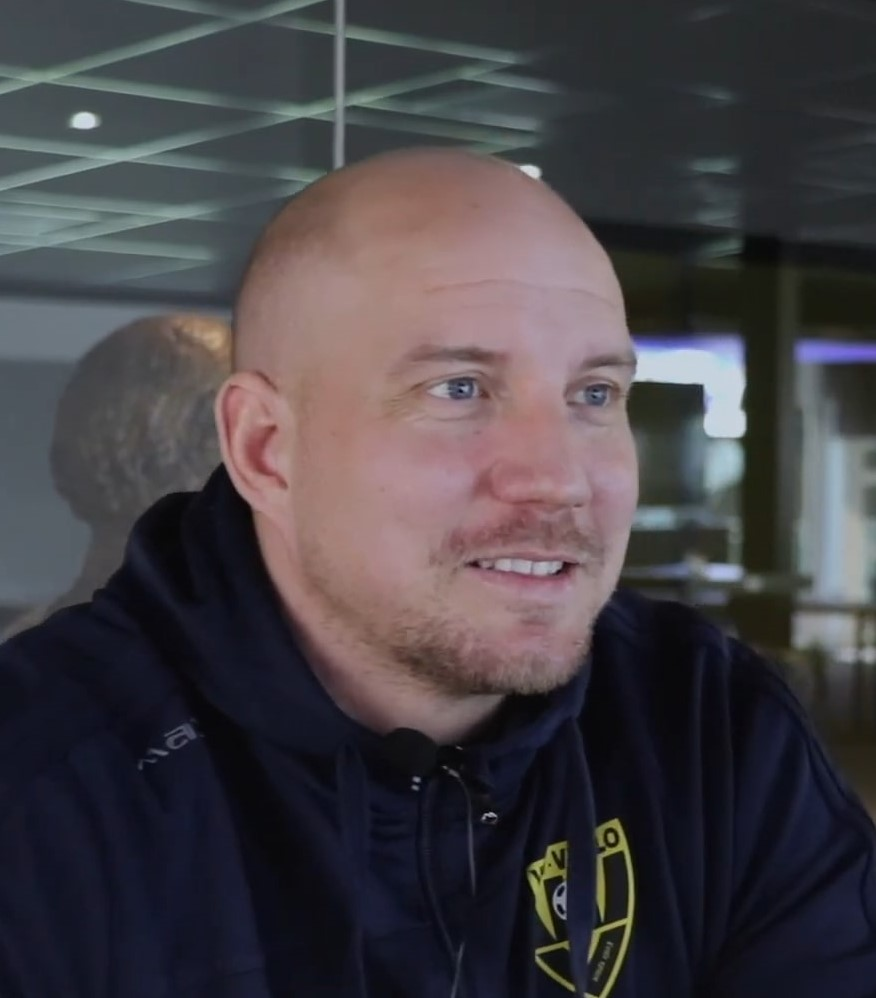
- Demouge in 2021

Personal information
- Full name: Frank Demouge
- Date of birth: 25 June 1982 (age 44)
- Place of birth: Nijmegen, Netherlands
- Height: 1.90 m (6 ft 3 in)
- Position: Striker

Senior career*
Years	Team	Apps	(Gls)
2001–2005	NEC	83	(15)
2005–2006	Eindhoven	22	(9)
2006–2007	Den Bosch	26	(12)
2007–2010	Willem II	93	(32)
2010–2012	Utrecht	49	(15)
2012–2013	Bournemouth	2	(0)
2013	→ Roda JC (loan)	11	(6)
2013–2015	Roda JC	48	(7)
Total		334	(96)

International career
2002–2003	Netherlands U21	4	(0)
- * Club domestic league appearances and goals

Frank Demouge (born 25 June 1982) is a Dutch former professional footballer who played as a striker. After retiring, he worked as a fitness coach.

== Club career ==
Demouge spent the majority of his playing career in his native the Netherlands, before moving to England in the summer of 2012.

=== NEC ===
Demouge began his professional career at NEC Nijmegen, where he played four seasons. His debut year was his most prolific with seven goals in 25 appearances. In his second season he scored four goals in 29 appearances. In the 2003–04 season, Demouge made his debut in the UEFA Cup, coming on as a 74th-minute substitute against Wisła Kraków. Demouge's final season was disappointing, plagued with injuries before eventually being released from NEC.

=== Eindhoven ===
Demouge signed for Eerste Divisie side FC Eindhoven in summer 2005. During the season of 2005-06, he managed to score nine goals in 29 appearances and he subsequently made a move to FC Den Bosch.

=== Willem II ===
After a successful spell in the Eerste Divisie, Demouge returned to top flight football with Willem II in the summer of 2007. Shortly after joining, he suffered a knee injury and was out for few weeks. His competitive debut finally arrived in September against FC Twente where he scored an own goal in a 3–1 loss. His first goals came in a 6–0 home win against Excelsior where he scored a brace. He managed to net eight times that season. The following season was Demouge's most prolific, managing 14 goals in 32 appearances. During this time, there was alleged interest of the Belgian side Club Brugge and Dutch side SC Heerenveen. However, he indicated that he had an aspiration to play English football and signed an extension.

=== Utrecht ===
After attracting much interest from around Europe, he signed a three-year contract with FC Utrecht on 31 August 2010, on the transfer deadline day. During his first two seasons, he scored 13 times in 43 appearances, including a goal in a 3-3 UEFA Europa League draw against Italian side Napoli in which Edinson Cavani netted a hattrick. However, his time was again injury plagued and he was released in the summer of 2012, a year before his contract expired.

=== AFC Bournemouth ===
Demouge joined League One in June 2012, making the switch to England. It was reported that he was recommended by AFC Bournemouth co-chairman Max Demin. During pre-season, he injured his knee again, this time during training which required surgery.

He made his debut in a 2-1 home defeat to Walsall FC, on 29 September playing the full 90 minutes. During his second game for the Cherries, Demouge suffered a broken nose and concussion following a head collision and was stretchered off in the 11th minute. There was another setback for the Dutch striker, suffering a calf injury in a reserves game. Amid rumors of an imminent return to the Netherlands, Demouge publicly stated his commitment to the club.

=== Roda JC Kerkrade ===
After playing half a season on loan for Eredivisie side Roda JC Kerkrade, Demouge dissolved his contract with Bournemouth and signed a two-year deal with Roda JC Kerkrade.

=== Knokke ===
In September 2015 Demouge signed a one-year contract at Knokke in the Belgian Fourth Division.

He joined Dutch amateur side RKSV Heer in January 2017 after being without a club for some time.

== International career ==
Demouge played 4 games for the Netherlands national under-21 football team.
