= Shwan Jalal =

Footballer (born 1983)

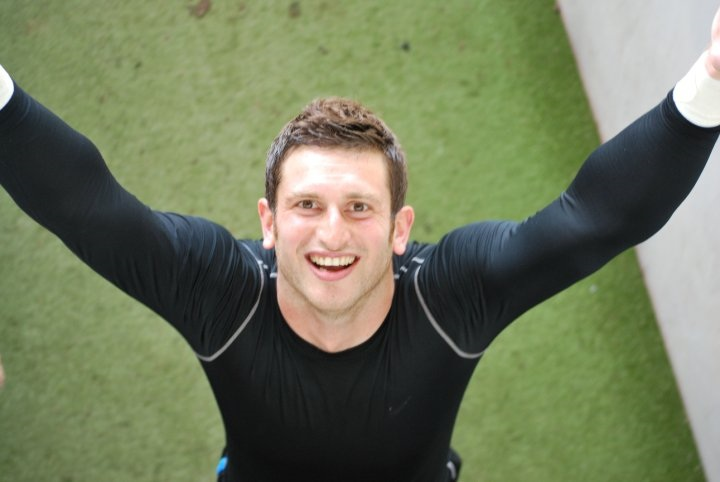
- Jalal in 2010

Personal information
- Full name: Shwan Saman Jalal
- Date of birth: 14 August 1983 (age 43)
- Place of birth: Baghdad, Iraq
- Position: Goalkeeper

Team information
- Current team: Newcastle United (goalkeeping coach)

Youth career
- 1998–1999: Gillingham
- 1999: Elphinstone Flyers
- 1999–2000: Hastings Town

Senior career*
Years	Team	Apps	(Gls)
2000–2001	Hastings Town		
2001–2004	Tottenham Hotspur	0	(0)
2002–2003	→ Woking (loan)	16	(0)
2004–2007	Woking	85	(0)
2006	→ Sheffield Wednesday (loan)	0	(0)
2007–2008	Peterborough United	8	(0)
2008	→ Morecambe (loan)	12	(0)
2008	→ AFC Bournemouth (loan)	2	(0)
2008–2014	AFC Bournemouth	171	(0)
2013	→ Oxford United (loan)	0	(0)
2014	→ Leyton Orient (loan)	2	(0)
2014–2015	Bury	5	(0)
2015	Northampton Town	4	(0)
2015–2016	Macclesfield Town	37	(0)
2016–2017	Wrexham	24	(0)
2017–2018	Macclesfield Town	41	(0)
2018–2020	Chesterfield	54	(0)
Total		475	(0)

International career
2005–2006	England C	5	(0)
- * Club domestic league appearances and goals

Shwan Saman Jalal (born 14 August 1983) is a professional football coach and former player who played as a goalkeeper. He is the goalkeeping coach at Premier League club Newcastle United. Born in Iraq, Jalal was capped five times for the England C team, but was later called up for the Iraq national team.

== Club career ==
Jalal, born to Iraqi parents in Baghdad, Iraq, grew up in Hastings, East Sussex, England, while attending William Parker School. He began his football career at Gillingham's youth system in 1998, before joining the youth system at Hastings Town in 1999, where he broke into the first team in 2000. At Hastings, he featured for the first team as a teenager, gaining attention from Football League clubs such as Tottenham Hotspur, whom he signed for in August 2001, before joining Woking in May 2004. He went on trial at Oldham Athletic in May 2005, and also had a trial at Leeds United in September 2006. Following his trial at Leeds, he joined Sheffield Wednesday on a month's loan in November.

He moved to Peterborough United in League Two for an undisclosed fee on 9 January 2007. He was placed on the club's transfer list at his own request in December, which was followed by a move to Morecambe on loan until the end of the 2007–08 season.

He joined AFC Bournemouth on a month's loan on 1 August 2008 after having a trial at the club. Bournemouth then made this move permanent on 29 August. He signed a new two-year contract with Bournemouth in March 2010. On 12 September 2013, Jalal joined Oxford United on a one-month emergency loan deal, but returned on 2 October 2013 – 1 game short of his initial loan – due to Ryan Allsop's suspension after receiving a red card at Leeds United. On 7 February 2014, Jalal joined Leyton Orient on a one-month loan deal.

On 5 June 2014, Bury announced that they had signed Jalal on a two-year contract after a successful trial at the club. He subsequently played for Northampton and Macclesfield Town.

In August 2016, Jalal joined National League side Wrexham. Jalal made his debut on 16 August 2016, replacing Chris Dunn in the starting line-up in a 1–0 victory over Solihull Moors and keeping a clean sheet. At the end of the 2016–17 season, he left the club. He subsequently re-joined Macclesfield Town on a one-year deal, winning promotion from the National League as champions, before his surprise release at the end of the season.

In May 2018, Jalal joined National League newcomers Chesterfield, signing a two-year contract.

== International career ==
Jalal made his debut for the England National Game XI in a 3–0 victory over against the Netherlands on 16 February 2005. Jalal was one of seven European based players called up by Iraq coach Wolfgang Sidka in a 34-man squad on 26 May 2011. However, he had to apologise for his absence due to an injury.

On 3 June 2015, Jalal played the first half of an unofficial friendly for the Iraq national team against Zakho in the opening game of the Zakho International Stadium.

== Coaching career ==
Upon retiring from playing in 2020, he took up roles as a goalkeeper coach, firstly with the Rochdale Academy and then Stockport County. He now works with Newcastle United.

== Honours ==
Macclesfield Town

- National League: 2017–18

Individual

- National League Team of the Year: 2017–18
