= Marriage in Northern Ireland =

Legal status of marriages and divorces in Northern Ireland

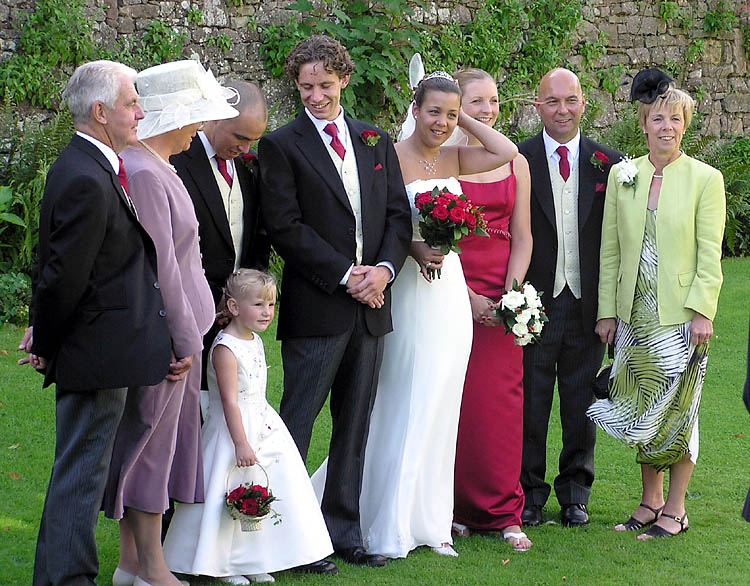
Lining up for a traditional wedding photograph

The marriageable age is 16 with parental consent but 18 otherwise. Marriage must be between two otherwise unmarried people (foreign divorces are generally recognised, but existing foreign polygamous marriages prevent a marriage as this would be treated as bigamy). If one of the parties wishing to marry is subject to immigration control, notice of marriage can only be given at a register office, which both parties must attend together. The UK Government was obliged, under the Northern Ireland (Executive Formation etc) Act 2019, to extend same-sex marriage to Northern Ireland by secondary legislation that took effect on 13 January 2020. Until then, same-sex marriages from other jurisdictions were treated as civil partnerships. Civil partnerships became available to same-sex couples in December 2005 and grant rights and responsibilities identical to civil marriage.

Certain relatives are not allowed to marry each other.

== Marriage procedures ==
The ceremonial side of marriage procedures in Northern Ireland are in many ways similar to those in England and Wales, but there is no restriction on the location of a religious marriage and the notification and registration involve a marriage schedule. In this respect, it resembles marriage in Scotland, although it discriminates against non-religious people with respect to outdoor weddings.

== Benefits and consequences ==
Upon death of one's spouse, bequests to the other spouse do not incur inheritance tax. Intestate property by default will go to the spouse. Also, there is partial inheritance of pensions.

Non-British spouses of British citizens may obtain residence permits.

Spouses are considered to have a duty of care towards each other, and certain social security benefits are calculated differently from those for single people.

== Foreign citizens wishing to marry in the UK ==
From 1 February 2005, a visitor who wishes to be married in the UK who is a citizen of a country that is not a member of the European Economic Area (EEA) must apply for a visa before they travel. Without the visa, the registrar will not be able to accept the notice of marriage and will not be able to perform the marriage ceremony.

Those already in the UK and citizens of a country that is not a member of the EEA needed the approval of the Home Secretary to be married, provided in the form of a certificate of approval. From 4 April 2011, the requirement for Certificate of Approval was abolished by the United Kingdom Parliament through a Remedial Order under Human Rights Act 1998.

== Divorce ==
Divorces in Northern Ireland from 1971 to 2020

Divorce is allowed on various grounds. Civil remarriage is allowed. Religious denominations differ on whether they permit religious remarriage.

== History ==
In the period 1759-1826 many couples from Ireland went to Scotland to marry, particularly to Portpatrick, Wigtown which was described as the Gretna Green for Ireland. There was a daily packet boat from Donaghadee, and marriages were conducted by the Church of Scotland minister at Portpatrick, though according to Brack (see Portpatrick) he often overlooked the rules about the publication of banns or the required period of residence.

A human rights legal case in 2017 and 2018 centered on Laura Lacole and Eunan O'Kane's request for a legally binding humanist marriage, supported by Humanists UK, which has implications for who can register as celebrants. In the initial 2017 judgment, the High Court ordered that the words "or belief" be "read in" to references to religion in marriage law to allow humanists to conduct legally binding humanist marriages; a similar decision was taken by the Scottish Registrar General in 2005. In 2018, the Court of Appeal said that refusing humanists legal marriage rights was unlawful discrimination, but quashed the order compelling a read-in, saying the state can avoid incompatibility by registering humanists to provide legal weddings as civil celebrants. Humanists UK celebrants in Northern Ireland became authorised to conduct legal marriages shortly after. The first humanist marriage in this new regime took place on 25 August 2018.

== See also ==
- Fleet Marriage
- Civil Partnership
- Marriage in England and Wales
- Marriage in Scotland
