= Humanists UK =

Charitable organisation promoting secular humanism

- Humanists UK logo
- Formation: 1896; 130 years ago
- Location(s): United Kingdom; Channel Islands; Isle of Man
- Members: 150,000 members and supporters (2025)
- President: Janet Ellis
- Vice President: Alice Roberts; Shaparak Khorsandi; Jim Al-Khalili; Polly Toynbee; A. C. Grayling; Laurie Taylor
- Chief Executive: Andrew Copson
- Publication: New Humanist (est. 1885)
- Affiliations: Humanists International
- Website: humanists.uk
- Formerly called: Union of Ethical Societies (1896–1928); Ethical Union (1928–1967); British Humanist Association (1967–2017)

Humanists UK, known from 1967 until May 2017 as the British Humanist Association (BHA), is a charitable organisation which promotes secular humanism and aims to represent non-religious people in the UK through a mixture of charitable services, campaigning on issues relating to humanism, secularism, and human rights, and through publishing the magazine New Humanist.

The charity also supports humanist and non-religious wedding, funeral, and baby naming ceremonies in England and Wales, Northern Ireland, and the Crown Dependencies, in addition to a network of volunteers who provide like-minded support and comfort to non-religious people in hospitals and prisons. Its other charitable activities include providing free educational resources to teachers, parents, and institutions; a peer-to-peer support service for people who face difficulties leaving coercive religions and cults; work to promote tolerance and understanding between religious communities and the non-religious; and work to promote humanist values and understanding of humanism. The current president of Humanists UK is Janet Ellis and the chief executive is Andrew Copson. The association currently has 70 affiliated regional and special interest groups and claims a total of approximately 140,000 members and supporters.

Humanists UK also has sections which run as staffed national humanist organisations in both Wales and Northern Ireland. Wales Humanists and Northern Ireland Humanists each have an advisory committee drawn from the membership and a development officer. Wales Humanists and Northern Ireland Humanists campaign on devolved issues in Cardiff and Belfast and work to expand the provision of humanist ceremonies, pastoral care, and support for teachers in those countries.

== Aims ==
The organisation's Articles of Association sets out its charitable aims as:

- The advancement of Humanism, namely a non-religious ethical lifestance the essential elements of which are a commitment to human wellbeing and a reliance on reason, experience and a naturalistic view of the world.
- The advancement of education and in particular the study of and the dissemination of knowledge about Humanism and about the arts and science as they relate to Humanism.
- The promotion of equality and non-discrimination and the protection of human rights as defined in international instruments to which the United Kingdom is party, in each case in particular as relates to religion and belief.
- The promotion of understanding between people holding religious and non-religious beliefs so as to advance harmonious cooperation in society.

Reflecting these, Humanists UK's 2021–2025 strategy defines its remit as:

By advancing the humanist approach to life, we inspire and support non‑religious people to be happy, confident, and ethical, and we work with them for a better society.

— Humanists UK strategy, 2021–2025

It defines its three strategic outcomes as:

1. More people knowing what humanism is and more people with humanist beliefs and values identifying themselves as humanists
2. More non-religious people living happier, more confident, and more ethical lives
3. More people enjoying greater freedom of thought, freedom of expression, and freedom of choice over their own lives

These three strands cover, broadly speaking, Humanists UK's education work, interfaith dialogue, and public awareness campaigns; the charity's support programmes offering direct support, including pastoral support and humanist ceremonies; and its public policy agenda, which includes lobbying on human rights and equalities issues.

== History ==
=== Ethical Union (1896–1967) ===
The organisation traces its origins to the Union of Ethical Societies, which was founded in 1896 under the leadership of American-born Stanton Coit. The Union brought together the numerous ethical societies existing in Britain. Amongst the important founding figures was Lady Elizabeth Swann (who presided over the inaugural conference). Other figures included the feminist writer Zona Vallance (its first Secretary), executive committee member May Seaton-Tiedeman (also a suffragist and divorce law campaigner), chair from 1900 to 1901 Ramsay MacDonald (who would go on to become Prime Minister), and the writer and critic Leslie Stephen (father of Virginia Woolf). Stephen served multiple terms as President of the West London Ethical Society.

The Union of Ethical Societies changed its name to the Ethical Union in 1920 and was incorporated in 1928. In 1963 H. J. Blackham became the first executive director.

In this period, the Ethical Union's projects focused on addressing legal and social barriers to non-religious people, as well as the needs of the urban poor, racial minorities, and elderly. Such projects included the Humanist Housing Association founded in 1955 (which exists today as Origin Housing), the Agnostics Adoption Society, later known as the Independent Adoption Society (IAS) founded in 1963 (made obsolete in the 1980s by non-discrimination laws), and the Humanist Counselling Service in 1960 (partially subsumed by the British Association for Counselling and Psychotherapy), and the umbrella network Secular Organisations for Sobriety (providing evidence-based, non-religious alternatives to the twelve-step programmes).

=== British Humanist Association (1967–2017) ===
The Ethical Union became the British Humanist Association (BHA) in 1967, during the Presidency of philosopher A. J. Ayer. This transition followed a decade of discussions which nearly prompted a merger of the Ethical Union with the Rationalist Press Association and the South Place Ethical Society. In 1963 the first two went as far as creating an umbrella Humanist Association of which Harold Blackham was the executive director.

In the 1960s, the organisation campaigned for reform of the Education Act 1944's clauses on religion in schools and it was active in the campaign to legalise abortion and homosexuality. It supported repeal of Sunday Observance laws and the end of theatre censorship, the provision of family planning on the NHS and other reforms. More generally the BHA aimed to defend freedom of speech, support the elimination of world poverty and remove the privileges given to religious groups. It was claimed in 1977 that the BHA aimed "to make humanism available and meaningful to the millions who have no alternative belief."

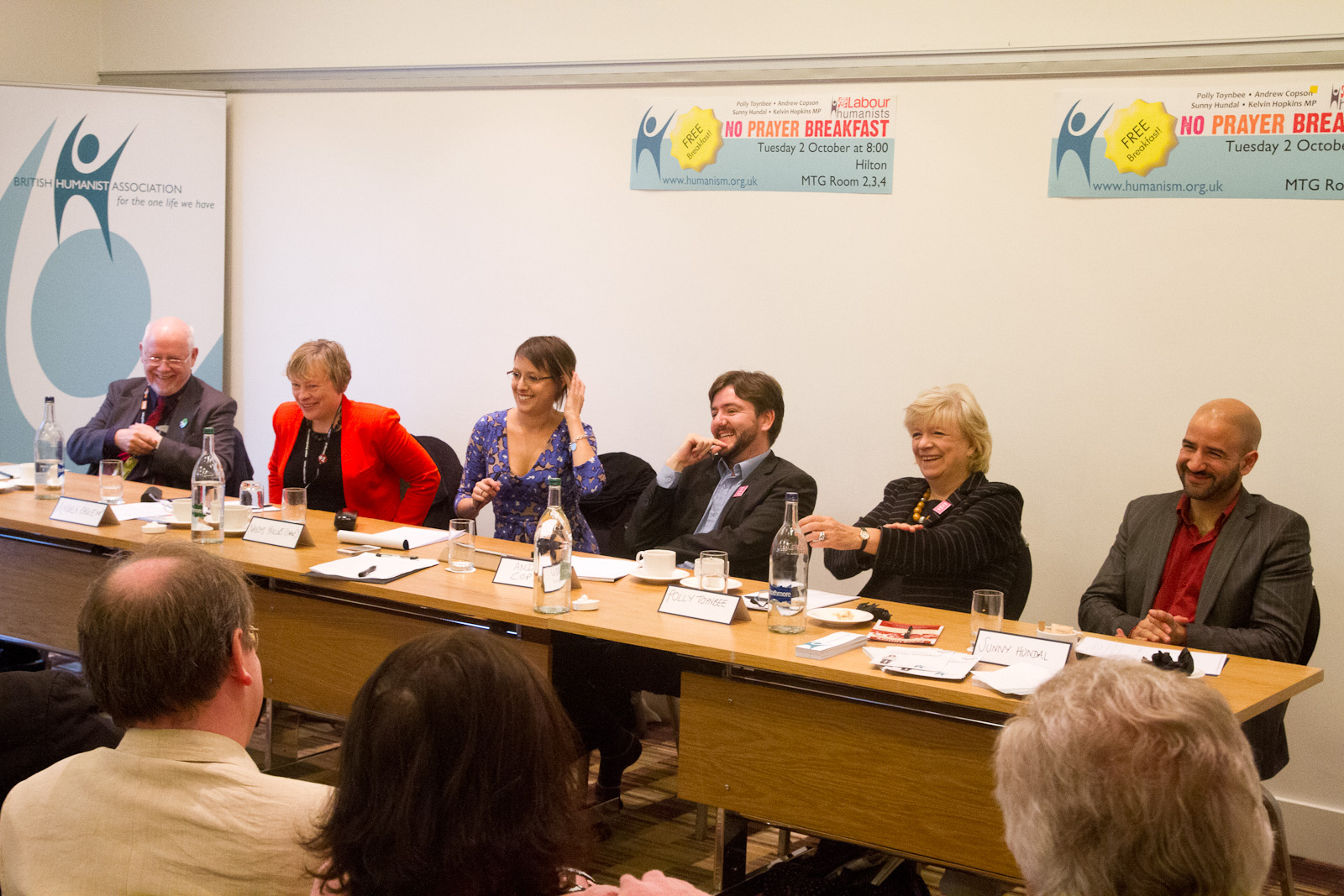
BHA supporters, including Andrew Copson and Polly Toynbee, taking part in a No Prayer Breakfast event at the Labour Party Conference in 2012

The local ethical societies united in 1896 had (mainly during the 1950s) renamed themselves as humanist groups and their number grew over time, becoming today's network of affiliated local humanist groups. A network of celebrants able to conduct non-religious funerals, weddings, naming ceremonies and same sex affirmations (before the law allowing gay civil partnerships) was also developed and continues today as Humanist Ceremonies.

Social concerns persisted in the BHA's programme. The BHA was a co-founder in 1969 of the Social Morality Council (later transmuted into the Norham Foundation), which brought together believers and unbelievers concerned with moral education and with finding agreed solutions to moral problems in society. The BHA was active in arguing for voluntary euthanasia and the right to obtain an abortion. It has always sought an "open society". It is credited with substantially popularising the salience and use of the concept in Britain. In 1969 it held an influential conference, Towards an Open Society, at the Royal Festival Hall.

Throughout the period, the number of people professing no religion grew steadily. This led to the creation of new programmes, as well as older programmes becoming redundant due to market forces stepping in or government action. For example, growing numbers of non-religious people led to numerous new housing associations forming which did not impose religious restrictions on who could use their services. The Humanist Housing Service was spun off from the BHA and acquired by a commercial provider. Meanwhile, the BHA's adoption service, whose focus had been non-discriminatory and interracial adoption, became obsolete following national anti-racism legislation. Still, new services came into being to suit the needs of the times, including the Humanist Bereavement Project. The Humanist Counselling Service, whose early work had been subsumed by the development of the BACP, was restarted in the 1990s response to growing awareness of discrimination and mistreatment of non-religious prisoners, hospital patients, and armed forces members in chaplaincy-based support services. This programme was re-established in 2016 as the Non-Religious Pastoral Support Network, together with other projects under a "Humanist Care" programme group. Humanist Care's other service reflected the changing demographics. Faith to Faithless was founded by ex-Muslim humanists to provide specialist support to people leaving high-control religions and cults, who are sometimes labelled apostates and subjected to shunning and honour-based violence.

The BHA also campaigned for reform of BBC broadcasting policy, including preferential treatment of religions and "religious privilege" in broadcast scheduling. Throughout the period, it told the BBC that its policy banning non-religious people from appearing on the Thought for the Day slot in Radio 4's Today programme was discriminatory. In April 2009 a "breakthrough" in the BHA's campaign saw Andrew Copson invited to participate as a humanist representative in the BBC's short-lived Standing Conference on Religion and Belief when it replaced the Central Religious Advisory Committee.

=== Humanists UK (2017–present) ===
In May 2017, the BHA changed its operating name to Humanists UK. Its chief executive, Andrew Copson, said that the change followed "a long, evidence-driven process with focus groups of non-religious people across the UK and research involving over 4,000 of our supporters... Humanists UK represents not just a new logo, but a totally new, friendly look that captures the essence of humanism: open, inclusive, energetic, and modern, with people and their stories placed first and foremost...".

By the 2020s, Humanists UK had achieved several key victories in relation to its service provision. Following changed NHS England and prison service guidelines on pastoral care, non-religious pastoral carers were embedded in many NHS trusts and local prisons as an example of best practice, and Humanists UK was an integral part of the spiritual care sector. In 2023, the Ministry of Defence awarded Humanists UK endorsing authority status to provide humanist pastoral carers to serve alongside religious chaplains in the army, navy, and air force. The Welsh Parliament also appointed a humanist pastoral carer to Welsh politicians, reflecting the significant non-religious population in Wales.

During the COVID-19 pandemic in 2020 and 2021, Humanists UK was part of the Government's moral and ethical advisory group, on the basis that humanists conducted a more significant share of British funerals than many religions. At the peak of the first national lockdown, Humanists UK organised a virtual "national memorial ceremony" led by its then-President Alice Roberts, Mark Gatiss, Joan Bakewell and others. Humanist funeral celebrants and pastoral carers were designated as "key workers" during lockdowns in the United Kingdom, and Humanists UK directed thousands of its members towards volunteering with mutual aid programmes and food banks, and in support of the Covid vaccine rollout. Humanists UK's Chief Executive was also invited by NHS England to lead a national ceremony of commemoration for NHS staff in 2021.

A number of perennial humanist campaigns saw success or significant progress in the late 2010s and early 2020s, including the legal recognition of humanist weddings in Northern Ireland and Jersey. Humanists UK also counted other wins around organ donation registers across the UK, same-sex marriage and legal abortion in Northern Ireland (later itself conducting the first same-sex marriages), legal changes to allow early stage at-home terminations of pregnancy, and the creation of Safe Access Zones around abortion clinics in response to rising levels of harassment experienced there. A major legal win concerning Religious Education curriculums in 2022 also led to humanists joining most Standing Advisory Councils on Religious Education as full members.

In 2021, Humanists UK celebrated its 125th anniversary. It launched a new Humanist Heritage website, cataloguing much of its 125-year history and the wider history of humanism in the UK, and received cross-party video messages of congratulations from the Leader of the Opposition and Labour, Sir Keir Starmer; the First Minister of Scotland and leader of the Scottish National Party, Nicola Sturgeon; from the leader of the Liberal Democrats, Sir Edward Davey; the co-leader of the Green Party of England and Wales, Siân Berry; and a warm letter of thanks from the Conservative UK Government.

In 2025, Humanists UK announced that it had completed a merger with the Rationalist Association after "more than a century" of close collaboration. This change saw Humanists UK take over the RA's responsibilities as the publisher of New Humanist magazine, transforming New Humanist into "the UK's newest major print publication", with more than 26,000 print subscribers and an online readership of more than 130,000.

Humanists UK continues to work closely with Conway Hall Ethical Society (formerly the South Place Ethical Society), the UK's other longstanding humanist charity.

== Campaigns ==
=== Schools ===
The organisation opposes faith schools because "The majority of the evidence [...] points towards their being an unfair and unpopular part of our state education system which the majority of people in Britain want them phased out." In addition, they argue that faith schools are "exclusive, divisive and counter intuitive to social cohesion" and blame religious admissions procedures for "creating school populations that are far from representative of their local populations in religious or socio-economic terms."

While the organisation is opposed to faith schools receiving any state funding whatsoever, it supports the Fair Admissions Campaign which has a more limited scope because "it furthers our aims of ending religious discrimination and segregation in state schools; and secondly because we know how important this particular topic is." The organisation campaigns for reform of Religious Education in the UK including a reformed subject covered by the national curriculum which is inclusive of non-religious viewpoints, such as "Belief and Values Education". They believe that "all pupils in all types of school should have the opportunity to consider philosophical and fundamental questions, and that in a pluralist society we should learn about each other's beliefs, including humanist ones".

Humanists UK President-elect Alice Roberts was criticised for sending her child to a faith school, despite Humanists UK's campaign against state-funded religious schools. She responded that this was the very point of the campaign: that she, like many other parents, had little choice over where to send her child and that she would have preferred a non-faith school option local to her.

Humanists UK also support humanist volunteers on the local Standing Advisory Council on Religious Education which currently determine the Religious Education syllabus for each local authority. Educational issues have always featured prominently in Humanists UK campaigns activities, including efforts to abolish compulsory daily collective worship in schools and to reform Religious Education so that it is "Objective, Fair and Balanced" (the title of an influential 1975 booklet) and includes learning about humanism as an alternative life stance.

The organisation opposes the teaching of creationism in schools. In September 2011, Humanists UK launched their "Teach evolution, not creationism" campaign, which aimed to establish statutory opposition to creationism in the UK education system. The Department for Education amended the funding agreement for free schools to allow the withdrawal of funding if they teach creationism as established scientific fact. In 2019, Humanists UK's Wales Humanists branch revived the campaign in partnership with David Attenborough after the Welsh Department of Education omitted to include similar safeguards against teaching creationism in schools.

Humanists UK has long campaigned in opposition to collective worship laws in the UK which require all schools to hold school assemblies "of a broadly Christian character". In 2019, the charity backed two parents to take a human rights challenge to those laws, arguing that the state had a duty to treat non-religious pupils equally and by effectively isolating those who withdraw from compulsory worship, discrimination occurs. Later that year, Humanists UK launched a new website, Assemblies for All, which compiles school assembly resources from NGOs, charities, government sources, the BBC, and businesses to make it possible for teachers and school leaders to put on "inclusive assemblies" on diverse topics – including the environment, mental health, and public holidays – as opposed to the collective worship required by law.

Through its education website Understanding Humanism, the charity also provides resources to teachers who want to include humanist perspectives and information about humanism in lessons.

=== Constitutional reform ===
The organisation campaigns for a secular state, which it defines as "a state where public institutions are separate from religious institutions and treat all citizens impartially regardless of their religious or non-religious beliefs." It points to issues such as the joint role of the British monarch (both Supreme Governor of the Church of England and Head of State), the reserved places for bishops in the House of Lords, the status of the Church of England (the officially established church), and other "discriminations based on religion or belief within the system" such as those in education and Public Services.

=== Ethical issues ===
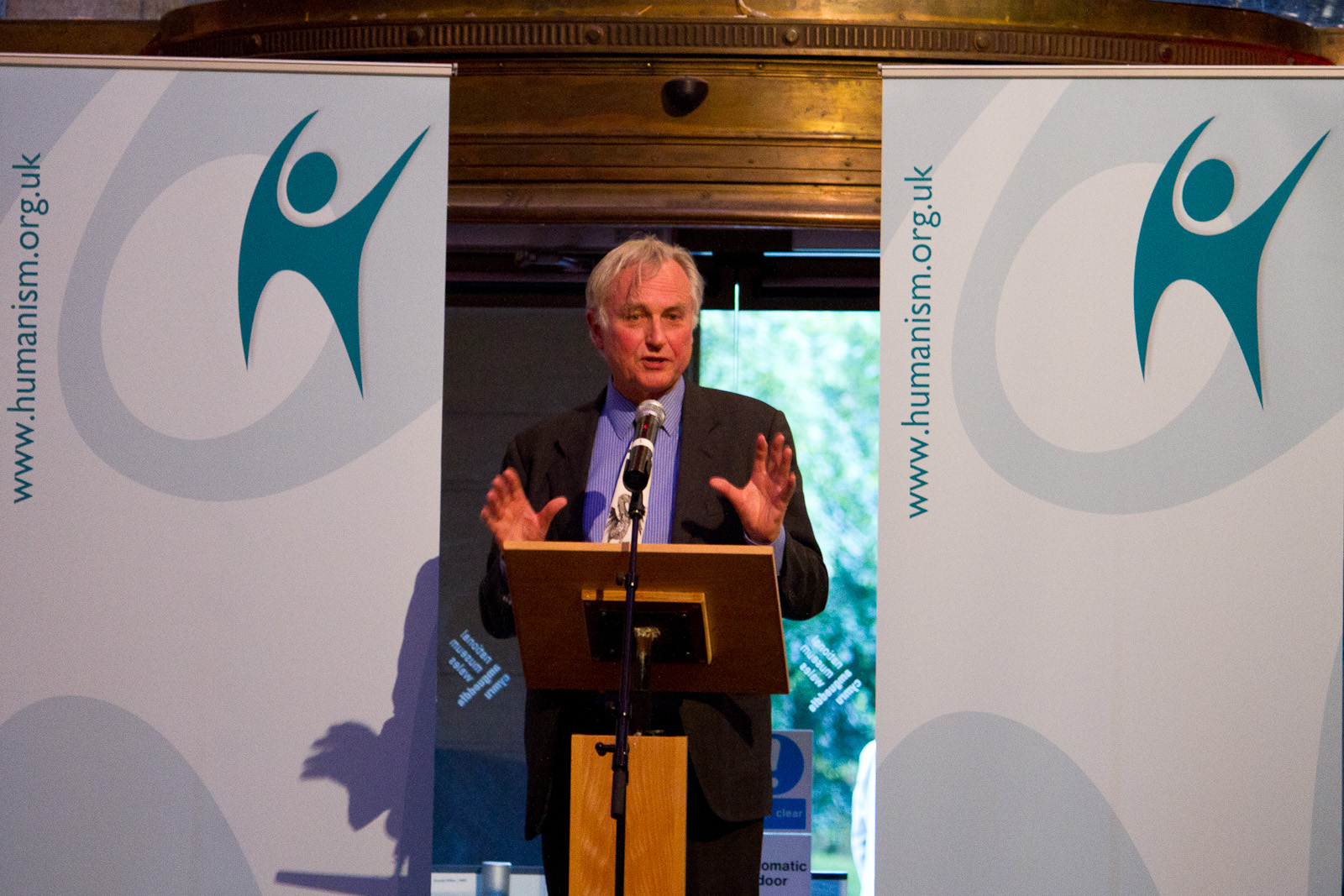
Richard Dawkins accepting the Services to Humanism award at Humanists UK Annual Conference in 2012

Humanists UK has supported the rights for those who need assistance in ending their own lives, and lobbied parliament for a change in the law, on behalf of Tony Nicklinson and Paul Lamb, in their 'Right to Die' legal cases. In 2014, it intervened in a Supreme Court case in which the court stated it would rule again on a potential declaration of incompatibility between restrictions on the right to die and the Human Rights Act should Parliament fail to legislate decisively. In February 2019 they helped form the Assisted Dying Coalition, a group of like-minded campaign groups seeking to legalise assisted dying for the terminally ill or incurably suffering.

Persistent campaigns include defending legal abortion in Great Britain and securing its decriminalisation and its legalisation in Northern Ireland, defending embryonic stem cell research for medical purposes, challenging the state funding of homeopathy through the National Health Service, and calling for consistent and humane law on the slaughter of animals. It has also campaigned for 'opt-out' organ donor registers to improve the availability of life-saving organs in the UK; Wales became the first part of the UK to adopt such a register in 2015. Jersey followed in 2019, to be followed by England in 2020.

The organisation also campaigns on marriage laws, demanding full equality for same-sex and humanist marriage ceremonies throughout the UK. Humanists UK had been providing same-sex wedding ceremonies for decades, and had strongly supported legalising same-sex marriage years in advance of eventual UK and Scottish legislation. In 2013, it secured an amendment to the same sex-marriage bill to require UK Government to consult on letting humanist celebrants conduct legal marriages. Though the consultation result strongly indicated that legalisation should go ahead, ministers have so far declined to use the order-making powers to effect the change. It also campaigns for same-sex and humanist marriages in Northern Ireland. In 2017, it supported a humanist couple to challenge Northern Ireland's refusal to give legal recognition to humanist marriages through the High Court in Belfast, which resulted in legalisation of humanist marriages in Northern Ireland in June 2017. After campaigning to legalise same-sex marriage in Northern Ireland, it celebrated its success with a promotional billboards across Belfast emblazoned, 'Love wins for everybody', advertising humanist ceremonies.

The charity has been consistently supportive of LGBT rights across its history. It was also among the first organisations to protest Section 28 in the late 1980s, and was one of the most vocal and longstanding advocates of a ban on gay conversion therapy, which it denounces as "religious pseudoscience" with harmful consequences. This eventually led to a 2018 commitment from the UK Government to ban the practice. Its humanist celebrants conducted non-legal partnership/wedding ceremonies for same-sex couples for many decades prior to the law changing.

Many of its campaigns are based on free speech and human rights legislation and it has based much of its campaigning on the Human Rights Act 1998. In 2008, the blasphemy law was repealed, an issue over which Humanists UK had long campaigned. It sought unification of existing anti-discrimination legislation and contributed to the Discrimination Law Review which developed the Equality Act 2006 and then the Equality Act 2010.

The BHA's thorough research helped many of us to make informed and better-argued contributions to debates, particularly on complex ethical issues which arise in this House by the year. In the field of human rights, the BHA also helped us to refine the Racial and Religious Hatred Bill, the Equality Act 2006 and, of course, the current Equality Bill, which I trust will be passed in the last days of this Parliament without too much compromise. Some noble Lords with whom we have differed may feel that we humanists have had too much to say in controversies about education, but we make no apology for trying to improve the teaching on sex in schools, nor for our opposition to the teaching of creationism as science.

— Lord Macdonald of Tradeston expresses gratitude for the BHA in Parliament, 18 March 2000

In January 2008 Humanists UK (known as the BHA at the time) and the National Secular Society approached the Scouts Association about a conflict between the claims of inclusivity on their website and their oath. In February 2008 journalists Bryan Appleyard and Deborah Orr criticised both Humanists UK and the National Secular Society for the (ultimately successful) campaign to end discrimination against non-religious children in the Scouts' Oath of Allegiance. In April 2008 Jonathan Petre, The Daily Telegraph religious affairs journalist, countered this position pointing out that the Scout Oath of Allegiance was discriminatory. After consultation with Humanists UK over a five-year period, Girlguiding UK in June 2013 and eventually the UK Scout Association in October 2013 recognised the discrimination and amended their oaths to accommodate non-religious young people from 1 January 2014.

In the 2020s, Humanists UK was one of the charities at the forefront of campaigns to defend the Human Rights Act and the freedom to instigate judicial review from threats of being watered down or repealed. It assembled a large civil society coalition of charities, trade unions, and human rights organisations speaking in defence of the present settlement.

=== Public awareness ===
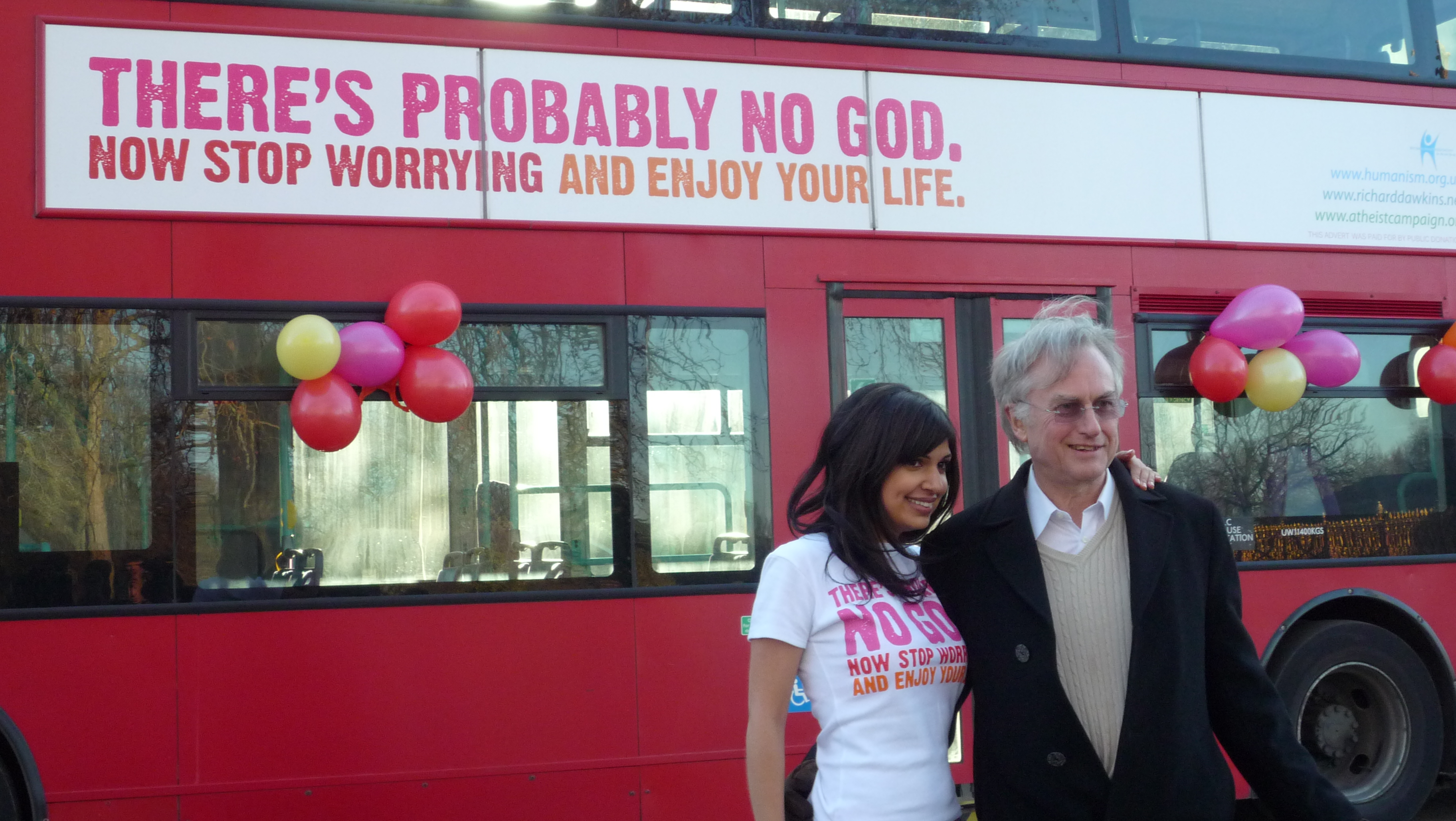
Ariane Sherine and BHA Vice President Richard Dawkins at the bus campaign launch

On 21 October 2008, Humanists UK lent its official support to Guardian journalist Ariane Sherine as she launched a fundraising drive to raise money for the UK's first atheist advertising campaign, the Atheist Bus Campaign. The campaign aimed to raise funds to place the slogan "There's probably no God. Now stop worrying and enjoy your life" on the sides of 30 London buses for four weeks in January 2009. Expecting to raise £5,500 over six months, the atheist author Richard Dawkins agreed to match donations up to £5,500 to make £11,000 total. The campaign raised more than £153,000, enabling a nationwide advertising campaign to be launched on 6 January 2009.

On 8 January 2009 Christian Voice announced they had made an official complaint to the Advertising Standards Authority asserting that the Atheist Bus slogan broke rules on "substantiation and truthfulness". In total the ASA received 326 complaints about the campaign, with many claiming that the wording was offensive to the religious, however Humanists UK contested the complaint and commented on the plausibility of the ASA making a claim as to the "probability of God's existence". Robert Winston criticised the campaign as "arrogant". The ASA ruled that the slogan was not in breach of advertising code.

In 2011, Humanists UK campaigned to get atheists, agnostics and other non-believers to tick the "no religion" box in response to the optional religion question in the 2011 census (as opposed to writing in either a joke religion like "Jedi" or ticking the religion one grew up in). Humanists UK believed the question was worded in such a way as to increase the number of currently non-religious or nominally religious people who list the religion they grew up in rather than their current religious views, and thus the results would have been skewed to make the country seem more religious than it actually is. Humanists UK believes that this supposed overstatement of religious belief creates a situation where "public policy in matters of religion and belief will unduly favour religious lobbies and discriminate against people who do not live their lives under religion".

Posters for the campaign which used the slogan "If you're not religious, for God's sake say so" were refused by companies owning advertising hoardings in railway stations following advice from the Advertising Standards Authority who believe the adverts had "the potential to cause widespread and serious offence".

The Census results for England and Wales showed that 14.1 million people, about a quarter of the entire population (25%), stated they had no religion at all, a rise of 6.4 million since the 2001 census. Humanists UK said the fall in the number of Christians from 72% to below 60% was "astounding", and calculated that they could be in a minority by 2018.

Set up in 2010, the Resolution Revolution campaign aims to "[recast] the tired old New Year resolution – so often about breaking a negative habit – as a pledge to do something positive for others". Participation is open to all and not restricted to humanists or the non-religious.

New Year is a time for renewal – but beyond diets and gyms, not just for ourselves. Resolution Revolution is a humanist social action initiative, turning good intentions outwards to others. The more people that get involved, even in a small way, the bigger the impact is. Spending cuts don't make a cohesive society, but generous actions do.

— Polly Toynbee

In 2014, Humanists UK launched two public awareness campaigns. The first, called "That's Humanism!", was an Internet-based campaign revolving around four videos on humanist responses to ethics, happiness, death, and the scientific method, as narrated by its distinguished supporter, Stephen Fry. The videos, which were widely shared on social media, were intended to introduce non-religious people who were humanist in their outlook to the existence of a community of like-minded people living their lives on the basis of reason and empathy. The second campaign, called "Thought for the Commute", was a London Underground campaign featuring posters depicting humanist responses from Virginia Woolf, George Eliot, Bertrand Russell and A.C. Grayling to the question "What's it all for?" The campaign intended to be a positive introduction to Humanism for commuters, as well as to highlight the exclusion of humanist voices from BBC slots such as Thought for the Day. After announcing that it intended to replicate it in other UK cities, the campaign moved to bus posters in Birmingham, Manchester and Liverpool for four weeks in November and December 2014, this time depicting humanist responses from Jim Al-Khalili, Jawaharlal Nehru, Natalie Haynes and Russell once again.

== Organisation ==
=== Presidents ===
#	President	Year(s) of Presidency	Source
1	Dr. John Stuart MacKenzie	1918–1921	Annual Reports
2	J. A. Hobson	1921	Annual Reports
3	Professor John Henry Muirhead	1922	Annual Reports
4	Professor Leonard Trelawny Hobhouse	1923	Annual Reports
5	Professor Graham Wallas	1924	Annual Reports
6	Dr. Felix Adler	1925–1926	Annual Reports
7	Professor Frederick Soddy	1927–1928	Annual Reports
8	Professor Gilbert Murray	1929–1930	Annual Reports
9	Lord Snell	1931–1932	Annual Reports
10	Dr. George Peabody Gooch	1933–1934	Annual Reports
11	Professor G. E. Moore	1935–1936	Annual Reports
12	Dr. Cecil Delisle Burns	1937–1938	Annual Reports
13	Dr. Stanton Coit	1939–1940	Annual Reports
14	Professor Susan Stebbing	1941–1942	Annual Reports
15	Professor John Laird	1943–1944	Annual Reports
16	H. N. Brailsford	1945–1946	Annual Reports
17	Sir Richard Gregory	1947–1950	Annual Reports
18	Lord Chorley	1951–1953	Annual Reports
19	Professor Morris Ginsberg	1954–1957	Annual Reports
20	Sir Julian Huxley (to May 1965)	1958–1965	Annual Reports
21	Professor Sir A. J. Ayer (to January 1970)	1966–1969	Annual Reports
22	Sir Edmund Leach	1970–1971	Annual Reports
23	George Melly	1972–1973	Annual Reports
24	Harold Blackham	1974–1976	Annual Reports
25	James Hemming	1977–1980	Annual Reports
26	Sir Hermann Bondi	1981–1999	Annual Reports
27	Claire Rayner	1999–2004	
28	Linda Smith	2004–2006	
29	Polly Toynbee	2007–2012	
30	Jim Al Khalili	2013–2016	
31	Shaparak Khorsandi	2016–2018	
32	Alice Roberts	2019–2022	
33	Adam Rutherford	2022–2025	
34	Janet Ellis	2026–present	

Prior to the creation of a president of the Union of Ethical Societies in 1918, and that of chair in 1916, several others held the equivalent role of Chair of the Annual Congress. The very first of these was a woman, the philanthropist and activist Lady Elizabeth Swann, who was the wife of a prominent liberal MP. She presided over the founding Congress of the Union in 1896. Other early chairs of the Annual Congress included then-future Prime Minister Ramsay MacDonald (1900-1901 and again in 1903).

In April 2011, it was announced that Professor A.C. Grayling would succeed Polly Toynbee as president of Humanists UK in July 2011. However, in June Humanists UK announced that Professor Grayling had decided not to take up that position, because of what he described as "controversy generated by activities in another area of my public life." Humanists UK stated that Polly Toynbee would continue as president until a new appointment was made later in 2011; she remained president for a further 18 months until in December 2012 it was announced that physicist Jim Al-Khalili would become president in January 2013.

=== Staff structure ===
The charity employs around 35 staff total and names the following individuals as senior staff on its website.

- Andrew Copson – Chief Executive
- Richy Thompson – Director of Human Rights and Advocacy
- Liam Whitton - Director of Advancing Humanism
- Clare Elcombe Webber – Director of Community Services
- Catriona McLellan – Chief Operations Officer
- Ann-Michelle Burton - Director of People and Culture
- Andrew West – Director of IT
- Kathy Riddick - Wales Coordinator
- Boyd Sleator - Northern Ireland Coordinator

Within the organisational structure, three directors manage broad areas of responsibility linked to Humanists UK's charitable aims in addition to a large functional directorate of operations. For example, the Director of Human Rights and Advocacy is responsible for the organisation's Policy Unit and its Faith to Faithless service, while the Director of Community Services is responsible for local groups and the Humanist Ceremonies network, and the Director of Advancing Humanism leads the organisation's education, publishing, marketing, and fundraising functions.

In Wales and Northern Ireland, the charity employs a staff member in each location responsible for coordinating its national branches Wales Humanists and Northern Ireland Humanists. These officers are in turn supported by national committees of volunteers whose advice assists the charity's service delivery in those countries, strategic litigation, and lobbying on devolved issues at the Northern Ireland Assembly and Senedd.

=== Humanist celebrants ===
Humanist equivalents of otherwise religious celebrations are conducted by humanist celebrants, trained and accredited by Humanists UK across England, Wales and Northern Ireland, while the Humanist Society Scotland performs similar ceremonies in Scotland. Non-religious funerals are legal within the UK; more than 8,000 funerals are carried out by humanist celebrants in England and Wales each year. Between 600 and 900 weddings and 500 baby namings per year are also conducted by Humanists UK-accredited celebrants. In England and Wales, a humanist wedding or partnership ceremony must be supplemented by a process of obtaining a civil marriage or partnership certificate through a Register Office to be legally recognised, but can be led by a Humanist celebrant.

The humanist funeral for former Welsh First Minister Rhodri Morgan at the Welsh Assembly was conducted by a Humanists UK celebrant, Lorraine Barrett and was the first national funeral in the United Kingdom to be led by a humanist celebrant.

Since 2018, Humanists UK celebrants have been able to conduct legally recognised marriages in Northern Ireland. This came about after Humanists UK supported a court case centring around its patrons, couple Laura Lacole and Eunan O'Kane.

=== Pastoral carers ===
Humanists UK maintains a network of roughly 150 trained and accredited volunteers in England, Wales, and Northern Ireland who go into hospitals, hospices, prisons, universities, and other settings to provide like-minded comfort and support to non-religious people during times of distress, much like a traditional religious chaplain. This network is known as the Non-Religious Pastoral Support Network. The project was initiated by data evidence which suggested that non-religious patients and inmates often refused support from a chaplain if they were themselves non-religious. Since 2014, the National Offender Management Service has recognised the legal right of prisoners to access non-religious pastoral carers, and since 2015, NHS England has recommended that every hospital in England offers a voluntary or employed non-religious carer. In 2018, Lindsay van Dijk was appointed as the first humanist to lead an NHS chaplaincy team at the Buckinghamshire Healthcare NHS trust, which includes the world-renowned spinal injuries unit at Stoke Mandeville hospital. The current chair of NRPSN is Amy Walden.

=== Young Humanists ===
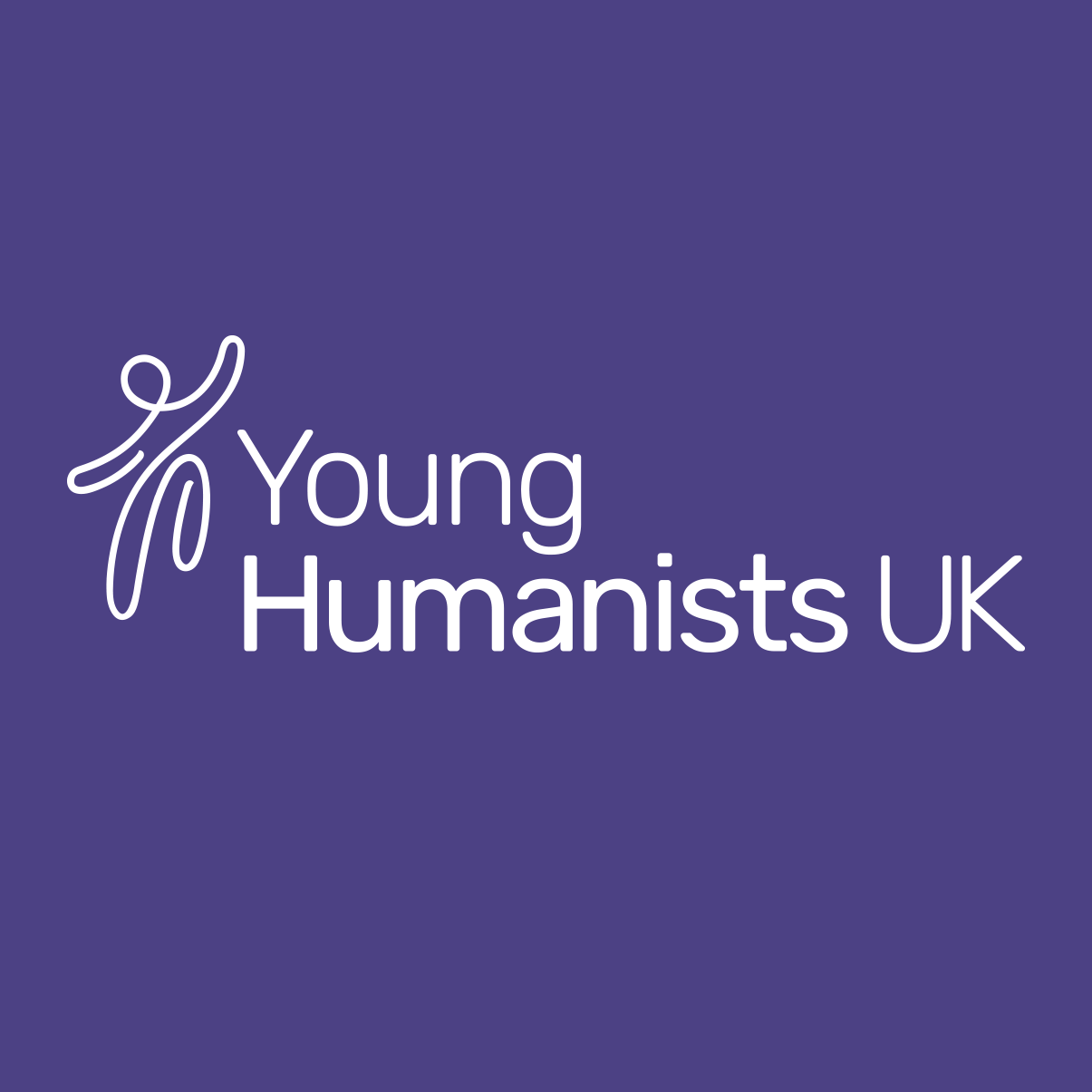
Young Humanists logo

Young Humanists is the organisation's youth wing, which launched early in 2015 with a number of events in cities across the UK.

=== Patrons ===
Numerous prominent people from the worlds of science, philosophy, the arts, politics, and entertainment are publicly aligned with Humanists UK, including Professor Alice Roberts, Tim Minchin, Stephen Fry, Matty Healy, Sandi Toksvig, Philip Pullman, and Dan Snow.

In the 20th century, key members of Humanists UK's "advisory council" included Karl Popper, Vanessa Redgrave, Harold Pinter, E M Forster, Bertrand Russell, John Maynard Smith, Harry Kroto, Ludovic Kennedy, Jacob Bronowski, and Barbara Wootton.

=== Affiliations ===
Humanists UK is a founding member of Humanists International, and the European Humanist Federation.

In September 2008, Humanists UK joined with religious organisations, teachers' unions, and other human rights campaigns groups to found the Accord Coalition, a diverse coalition made up of groups that oppose religious segregation in education.

Humanist Students is a national federation of atheist, humanist, secularist, and skeptic societies at universities and is part of Humanists UK. Its elected delegates traditionally, alongside members of Young Humanists, represent Humanists UK at Young Humanists International events.

Humanists UK has traditionally worked closely with the British Pregnancy Advisory Service, which was founded by the president of Birmingham Humanists, sexologist Martin Cole, in 1968. Humanists UK was a founding member of the BPAS "We Trust Women" coalition, which campaigns for the full decriminalisation of abortion throughout the UK.

The organisation supports a network of affiliated humanist groups throughout the UK and aims to encourage local campaigning, charity work, socialising, and events on a local level, and provides resources to assist the creation and running of such groups. Some of these groups are formally partnered with Humanists UK, which entitles them to added staff and promotional support, while others maintain a looser affiliate agreement. As of 2017, the number of partner groups stands at 47, with 15 affiliates.

The charity has also sponsored philosophical debates at HowTheLightGetsIn Festival.

== Lecture series ==
Humanists UK runs a prestigious annual events programme, including the Darwin Day Lecture (on themes connected with Darwin's work and humanism), the Rosalind Franklin Lecture (commemorating women in humanism), the Voltaire Lecture (on humanism more generally), the Bentham Lecture (co-hosted with University College London's philosophy department), the Holyoake Lecture (held in Manchester and covering humanism and political thought), and an annual convention which moves around the UK from year to year.

Past speakers at these events include top scientists, authors, and academics, including Steven Pinker, Brian Cox, Richard Dawkins, Robert Hinde, AC Grayling, Natalie Haynes, Bonya Ahmed, Bettany Hughes, Alice Roberts, Nick Cohen, Ludovic Kennedy, Michael Foot, Lawrence Krauss, Eugenie Scott, Adam Rutherford, Tom Blundell, and Jerry Coyne, Anne Glover, Angela Saini, Sarah-Jayne Blakemore, Jim Al-Khalili, Owen Jones, and Kate Pickett.

== Annual award ==
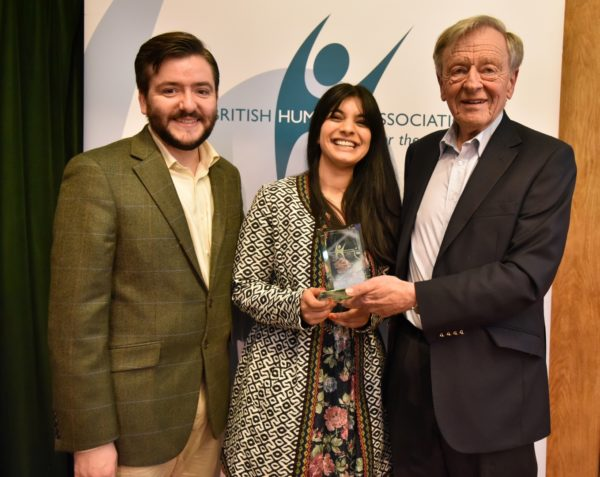
Alf Dubs pictured alongside Andrew Copson and Pavan Dhaliwal as he is awarded Humanist of the Year by Humanists UK in 2016

From 2011 Humanists UK presented an annual award for special contributions to Humanism. It is known as the Humanist of the Year Award, having been known prior to 2014 as the Services to Humanism Award. The award was customarily presented during Humanists UK annual conference (or, in 2014, the UK-hosted World Humanist Congress). Since 2016 it has been presented at a special reception event. Past winners are:

- 2011: Philip Pullman, Services to Humanism Award
- 2012: Richard Dawkins, Services to Humanism Award
- 2013: Terry Pratchett, Humanist of the Year Award
- 2014: Gulalai Ismail and Wole Soyinka, International Humanist of the Year Award (both presented as part of World Humanist Congress)
- 2015: Alice Roberts, Humanist of the Year Award
- 2016: Lord Dubs, Humanist of the Year Award
- 2017: Joan Bakewell, Humanist of the Year Award
- 2018: Northern Ireland Humanist Campaigners (Laura Lacole, Eunan O'Kane, Steven McQuitty, Ciaran Moynagh, Caolfhionn Gallagher QC, Janet Farrell, and Sarah Ewart accepting), Humanists of the Year Award.

Earlier awardees include A. J. Ayer, Leo Igwe, Polly Toynbee, and Julian Huxley.

== See also ==
- All Party Parliamentary Humanist Group
- Atheist, Humanist, and Secular Students
- Disestablishmentarianism
- LGBT Humanists UK
- Non-Prophet Week
- Separation of church and state (UK)
