= Collective worship in schools =

Section 70 of the School Standards and Framework Act 1998 stipulates that pupils of community, foundation or voluntary schools in England and Wales must take part in a daily act of collective worship, unless they have been explicitly withdrawn by their parents. The same requirement is applied to academy schools via their funding agreements, so it is true to say that all maintained schools in England and Wales are subject to the same rules. However, in practice there is widespread non-compliance with the legislation, which has not been monitored by Ofsted since 2004.

The responsibility for ensuring that the rules are applied rests with a school's head teacher, its governing body and the Local Education Authority. Local Education Authorities normally exercise this function via a Standing Advisory Council for Religious Education (SACRE).

== Definition and aims of collective worship ==
Guidance from the Department for Education (DfE) defines worship in this context as "reverence or veneration paid to a divine being or power." It makes a distinction between the terms "collective worship" and "corporate worship", with the latter being worship amongst a group with beliefs in common.

It also describes the aims of the legislation as follows: "Collective worship in schools should aim to provide the opportunity for pupils to worship God, to consider spiritual and moral issues and to explore their own beliefs; to encourage participation and response, whether through active involvement in the presentation of worship or through listening to and joining in the worship offered; and to develop community spirit, promote a common ethos and shared values, and reinforce positive attitudes."

== Required attributes of collective worship ==
The nature of the required daily act of collective worship in England and Wales is set out in schedule 20 of the School Standards and Framework Act 1998. This defines collective worship as "a single act of worship for all pupils" or separate acts of worship for groups of pupils. It should normally take place on school premises. The nature of the acts of worship should take into account the ages, aptitudes and family backgrounds of the pupils.

Schools with a formal faith designation are required to arrange worship in accordance with their trust deed or, if they have no trust deed, in line with the practices of their designated faith. For schools without a formal faith designation, the majority of the acts of worship should be "of a broadly Christian character". In practical terms, this has been interpreted to mean that 51% of school days each school term must have an act of worship of a broadly Christian character.

The legislation is supplemented by non-statutory DfE guidance. This makes it clear that sixth-formers can decide for themselves whether or not to take part in collective worship. It also sets out circumstances under which a local SACRE can grant a formal determination that an individual school can provide alternatives to the "broadly Christian" collective worship arrangements required by the legislation.

While head teachers have a duty to ensure that the law on collective worship is upheld within their school, they cannot themselves be required to participate in it, or to direct other teachers to participate it, against their will. Nor can they make the willingness to participate in, or lead, collective worship a condition of teachers' employment. If necessary, head teachers are required to source "appropriate people from the local community who would be willing and able to lead collective worship".

== Compliance with, and challenges to, the law on collective worship ==
When the head of Ofsted announced that it would no longer inspect the provision of collective worship in 2004, he stated that 76% of secondary schools were not compliant with the law. An opinion poll commissioned by the BBC in 2011 indicated that 64% of parents in England say their children do not attend a daily act of worship at school, and that 60% of the general public are not in favour of the law on collective worship being enforced.

In 2011, amendments were proposed to the law on collective worship, which would have made it optional at schools without a formal faith designation, and which would have also made it easier for pupils to opt themselves out of collective worship. The amendments were debated in the House of Lords, but were not adopted.

Nigel Genders, the Church of England's Chief Education Officer stated that:

"We live at a time when children feel besieged by social media, weighed down by pressure and report poor mental health. Collective worship offers ten minutes in a day for children to pause and explore the big existential questions such as ‘Who am I?’ ‘Why am I here?’ and ‘How then should I live?"

Philosopher James K. A. Smith holds that daily collective worship imparts what an educational institution values and has an impact on human formation; because the United Kingdom's national identity and ethics "are fundamentally rooted in Christianity", there is no reason why collective worship should be discontinued. Elizabeth Oldfield, the director of the Theos Think Tank (owned by the Bible Society) has opined that scrubbing religion from the public square is far from neutral. The Catholic Education Service teaches that:

Collective worship offers all schools the chance to explore and understand the values at the heart of their ethos. From forgiveness and humility, to gratitude and justice, collective worship gives pupils a space and time to reflect. If it is a part of a school’s routine, collective worship provides a shared language of values to build a close-knit cohesive community. Whether in times of crisis or celebration, the time set aside in the school day for reflection provides everyone with the opportunity to gather and support one another as a community.

Groups campaigning to amend the law on Collective Worship include Humanists UK and the National Secular Society, who argue that the requirement for daily worship should be replaced by a requirement for inclusive assemblies instead. The National Governors Association is also seeking an end to compulsory collective worship in schools without a religious affiliation. In 2014 a leading education spokesperson for the Church of England, Bishop Pritchard, publicly expressed a view that the term collective worship should be re-framed as "spiritual reflection" to make it, in his eyes, "more honest, and more in tune with contemporary culture." The Liberal Democrats have adopted a policy to make collective worship in non-religious schools optional rather than compulsory, and a change in the law has also been called for by the Arts and Humanities Research Council. In 2016, the Committee on the Rights of the Child called for an end to compulsory collective worship in UK schools.

Christian nationalists see the call by some to remove collective worship in schools as "the next step in the ongoing erosion of our Christian heritage" and state that "Christian collective worship should stay because [the UK is] a Christian nation."

== History of the law on collective worship ==
The law on compulsory collective worship was first introduced by Section 25 of the Education Act 1944. The legislation was subsequently developed by the Education Reform Act 1988, by Chapter III of the Education Act 1996, and, most recently, by the School Standards and Framework Act 1998.

== Collective worship in other parts of the UK (Scotland and Northern Ireland) ==
Collective worship is also a daily legal requirement in Northern Ireland, although regulations on the nature of the worship are different to that of England and Wales.

In Scotland there is no requirement for collective worship, but the practice of religious observance should be available to pupils, unless the local education authority has resolved to discontinue it and this resolution has been approved by local electors.
