= Zona Vallance =

Ethical Movement writer and lecturer (1860–1904)

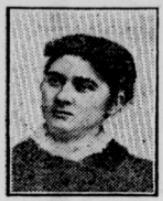
- Born: 6 February 1860; Stratford, London
- Died: 15 December 1904 (aged 44); Kensington, London
- Occupations: Writer, lecturer, secretary of the Union of Ethical Societies (now Humanists UK)
- Movement: Ethical Movement

Zona Vallance (6 February 1860 – 15 December 1904) was a writer, lecturer, feminist, and key figure in the British Ethical Movement. As the inaugural Secretary of the Union of Ethical Societies (now Humanists UK), she held the equivalent role of today's Chief Executive.

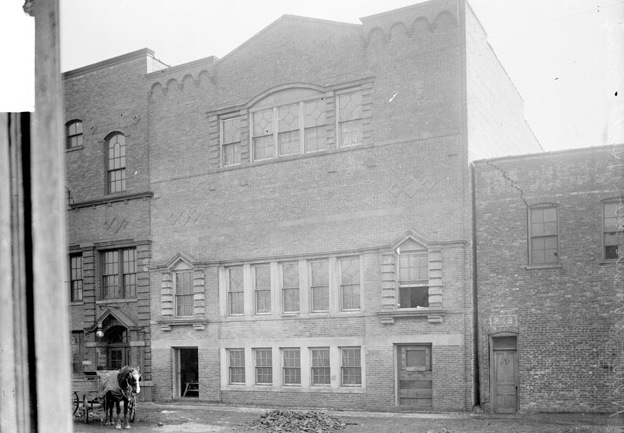
Hull House, Chicago, where Vallance delivered a lecture in 1902

== Life ==
Zona Vallance was born in Stratford, London on 6 February 1860, the daughter of Thomas James Vallance, a doctor, and Lucy (née Skipper). At 30, she was a founding member of the East London Ethical Society (launched in 1890), described as 'devoted and enthusiastic' by fellow worker Frederick James Gould in his Life-Story of a Humanist. From her earliest involvement with the Ethical Movement, Vallance spoke widely on its behalf, advocating the development of moral ideas and action distinct from theological or supernatural beliefs. A central principle of the movement was that 'the love of goodness and the love of one's fellows are the true motives for right conduct; and self-reliance and co-operation are the true sources of help.' Vallance herself wrote that 'Salvation consists in the surrender of the private for the public weal'.

Zona Vallance was the first Secretary of both the Union of Ethical Societies and the Moral Instruction League, which advocated for non-theological moral education for the young. She contributed regularly to the journal the Ethical World, writing on women's rights and suffrage, keeping up 'a commentary on Parliament, the courts, and on women's societies'. Her significance to the movement is noted by Gustav Spiller in his history of the Ethical Movement in Great Britain, who wrote

The name of Miss Vallance recurs repeatedly in this History as Secretary to the Ethical Union and to the Moral Instruction League, and in other capacities. She contributed frequently to the columns of The Ethical World, wrote leaflets and pamphlets, lectured, and assisted in numerous other ways, and stressed more especially justice to women in the social and political sphere.

== Work for the Union of Ethical Societies ==
Vallance was secretary of the Union of Ethical Societies 1895–1899, and the Moral Instruction League from December 1897 to January 1900. She was also an organiser in the Union's Moral Instruction Circle, which worked to convince 'numerous London teachers and parents that moral instruction could be interestingly and effectively given.' As part of this, in June 1899 Vallance and others from the Union of Ethical Societies (including J. R. MacDonald) presented a petition to the London School Board challenging the use of the Bible in schools, and arguing that 'the supposition that parents are pleased with the present Bible teaching is quite unfounded in fact'. The Committee suggested that

It is universally admitted that various motives concur to hinder parents from availing themselves of the "Conscience Clause" of the Education Act. In addition to the fears for themselves or their children which deter them, many parents are influenced by the knowledge that the hour devoted to theological teaching is also the only time set apart for systematic instruction in morals, and many who disapprove the former are nevertheless unwilling to deprive their children of the latter.

In 1901, Vallance was assigned a one-year lectureship by the Ethical Lecturers' Fund Committee, which consisted of Leslie Stephen, A. Vernon Harcourt, G. F. Stout, J. H. Muirhead, and Stanton Coit. This Committee arose 'from a conviction... that a great national good might be done by a thorough teaching and preaching of moral principles among the people,' undertaken by those in sympathy with the principles of the Union of Ethical Societies. The following year, Vallance undertook a lecture tour of the United States, speaking at various societies and clubs. Among these was Hull House, a settlement co-founded in 1899 by Jane Addams and Ellen Gates Starr, where she gave a talk entitled 'The Economic Dependence of Man upon Women'. In it, she argued that women must agitate for political rights, and that they deserved to be compensated through some form of national tax for their services in the household. At the conference of the New York Society for Ethical Culture, Vallance lectured on 'Women and the Ethical Movement', stating that 'all self-respecting women' should 'be found in the vanguard of self-assertion today' and lead the way in ethical reforms. She also spoke in praise of women's trade unions as an example of the way 'the woman of ethical culture persuasion should bend her energies to the enlightenment ... and industrial emancipation of women in the busier walks of life'.

In addition to lecturing, Vallance produced a number of pamphlets for the Union of Ethical Societies, including 'Reason in the Ethical Movement', 'The Ethical Movement and Women', and 'The Ethical Movement and the After Life'. She wrote at length on the role of women in a chapter for the 1900 collection Ethical Democracy: Essays in Social Dynamics, published by the Society of Ethical Propagandists and edited by Stanton Coit. Other contributors to the volume included G.H. Perris, J. R. MacDonald, J. H. Muirhead, F. J. Gould, Margaret McMillan, and Christen Collin.

== Women's Rights ==
Vallance's socialism, humanism, and feminism were deeply intertwined. In 1902 she contributed an article to the International Journal of Ethics on the position of women entitled 'Women as Moral Beings'. This was summarised in Mind as arguing that '[u]nless intelligent women have more rights as against their husbands they may refuse the burdens of marriage. They should be put more on a financial and legal equality, and should be remunerated for the duties of motherhood. Vallance 'looks forward to a women’s movement that advocates such reforms in recognition of both the "tyranny of limiting all women to family occupations" and the "pernicious effects of expecting a domestic worker to be also a market earner".' In 'Women as Moral Beings', she asked

Can our world be so re-modelled that women no less than men shall have free scope for the satisfaction of many-sided human nature and aspiration? ... What is right for finite beings to do always depends on what is possible; and yet the very Hall-mark of Humanity is to sit in judgement upon the possible.

Ian MacKillop argues that as the lead writer on women's issues in the Ethical World from 1899 until her death in 1904, Vallance was by no means 'preaching to the converted', but 'had to justify female suffrage from the beginnings'. He notes that Vallance took particular aim at 'the socialist of good-will who simply could not understand the relevance of the woman question to analysis of capitalism'. For her, the individualistic ideology of capitalism and the idea of men as inherently dominant, contributed to the ongoing subjugation of women in social and political life. Of Vallance's focus on motherhood, which was read by some as counter to progressive feminist ideas, MacKillop writes that

She made much of the mother-figure because of the place it occupied for her in an evolutionist's myth of origin which replaced the Christian myth of patriarchy. Under theology-based systems of ethics woman was passive, unenquiring and obedient, until sinful. Under a post-Darwinian system woman was, in a quite literal sense, capable of being held responsible for the 'ethical movement' of mankind... It is not meant to decree a retreat into solo responsibility for child-care in twentieth-century woman. On the contrary, Zona Vallance thought that husband and wife should act as partners, a collaboration between genders which contested the Christian single gender model of paired authority, that between Father and Son.

== Death ==
Zona Vallance died in Kensington on 15 December 1904, at the age of 44. Of her, fellow suffragist, socialist, and ethical society member Dora Montefiore wrote

The cause of Humanity lost on December 16 [sic] one of its most devoted workers in the person of Zona Vallance, writer and lecturer, who, after a short but painful illness, is now at rest. A woman fellow-worker writes of her: “She recognised clearly and fully that every worthy motive for right living remained the same, whether life lived ‘for evermore,’ or ceased with the parting breath; and the less she concerned herself for a personal immortality the more she strove for the well-being and the moral progress of the race. ‘Progress,’ writes a modern author, consists in human souls, taught to know their dignity, and the vast Universe of their inheritance.'

Zona Vallance’s significant contributions to the Ethical Movement were acknowledged in Stanton Coit’s Ethical Church with a plaque designed by Ernestine Mills, a fellow Ethical Society member and women’s rights advocate. In a pamphlet describing the secular church, Coit wrote

The first memorial tablet to be placed in our Church is the one to the left of our pulpit. It is a testimonial of the high esteem in which Miss Zona Vallance was held by all her colleagues in the Suffrage and Ethical Movements. It is a splendid enamel by Mrs Ernestine Mills, representing a Joan of Arc figure bearing an ensign of purple, green and white, the colours of the Women’s Social and Political Union, and memorialising Miss Vallance’s enthusiastic welcome to this more aggressive organisation, concerning the latter developments of which she did not live to form a judgement.

A bequest by Vallance 'for the promotion of the cause of all women's political, professional and financial equality with men' caused consternation among her executors and next of kin. In 1945, the Gloucester Citizen reported that although the National Council of Women had claimed the gift, a judge ruled that it was 'invalid for uncertainty', stating that he 'had no notion how a trust to promote the cause of equality with men or womenhood in general, wherever they might come from and whatever their race or colour, could be executed by the Court.'

== Bibliography ==
- 'Can Virtue always be taught?' (1900) in The Indian Journal of Education
- 'Women as Citizens' in Ethical Democracy: Essays in Social Dynamics (1900)
- Women as Moral Beings in the International Journal of Ethics (1902)
- 'The Christian Church and the Ethical Societies (an address given before the Society for Ethical Culture of Philadelphia, 7 December 1902) in Ethical Addresses (1905) by the American Ethical Union
- The Ethical Movement and Women (1905)
- Reason in the Ethical Movement (1910)
