= 2013–14 AFC Bournemouth season =

Bournemouth
2013–14 season
- Chairman: Jeff Mostyn
- Manager: Eddie Howe
- Stadium: Dean Court
- Championship: 10th
- FA Cup: Fourth round
- League Cup: Second round
- Top goalscorer: League: Lewis Grabban (22 goals); All: Lewis Grabban (22 goals)
- Highest home attendance: 11,475 vs Liverpool (FA Cup, 25 Jan 14)
- Lowest home attendance: 7,258 vs Huddersfield Town (Champ, 28 Jan 14)
- Average home league attendance: 9,114
Home colours	Away colours	Third colours

The 2013–14 season was AFC Bournemouth's first season in the Football League Championship following their promotion from Football League One the previous year. This season marks the second time they were higher than the Third Division of English football.

== Championship data ==
=== League table ===
Pos	Team	Pld	W	D	L	GF	GA	GD	Pts
8	Blackburn Rovers	46	18	16	12	70	62	+8	70
9	Ipswich Town	46	18	14	14	60	54	+6	68
10	Bournemouth	46	18	12	16	67	66	+1	66
11	Nottingham Forest	46	16	17	13	67	64	+3	65
12	Middlesbrough	46	16	16	14	62	50	+12	64

Source: BBC Sport
Rules for classification: 1) points; 2) goal difference; 3) number of goals scored

=== Result summary ===
Overall								Home						Away					
Pld	W	D	L	GF	GA	GD	Pts	W	D	L	GF	GA	GD	W	D	L	GF	GA	GD
46	18	12	16	67	66	+1	66	11	5	7	40	27	+13	7	7	9	27	39	−12

Last updated: 3 May 2014.

=== Result by round ===
Round	1	2	3	4	5	6	7	8	9	10	11	12	13	14	15	16	17	18	19	20	21	22	23	24	25	26	27	28	29	30	31	32	33	34	35	36	37	38	39	40	41	42	43	44	45	46
Ground	H	A	H	A	A	H	H	A	H	A	H	A	A	H	A	H	H	A	A	H	A	H	H	A	A	H	H	H	A	H	A	H	A	A	H	A	A	H	A	H	H	A	H	A	H	A
Result	W	L	W	L	W	L	W	D	L	L	W	D	L	L	D	L	D	L	W	L	W	W	D	D	L	D	W	L	D	D	L	W	W	W	D	L	W	W	W	W	W	D	L	D	W	L
Position	3	15	7	11	6	9	7	8	10	13	8	9	11	15	14	16	17	19	16	17	15	15	16	16	16	16	14	14	15	15	17	16	15	12	12	12	12	10	10	10	9	9	9	11	9	10

Updated to match(es) played on 3 May 2014. Source:
A = Away; H = Home; W = Win; D = Draw; L = Loss

== Kit ==
Supplier: Fila
Sponsor(s): Energy Consulting

Home	Away	Alternative

Last updated: 2 June 2013.
Source: AFC Bournemouth 13/14 Fila Away kit

== First-team squad ==
As of 18 March 2014

No.	Name	Position (s)	Nationality	Place of Birth	Date of Birth (Age)	Int. caps	Int. goals	Signed from	Date signed	Fee	Contract End
Goalkeepers
NA	Shwan Jalal	GK	(Iraq)	Baghdad	14 August 1983 (age 43)	1	0	Peterborough United	July 2008	Free	–
1	Ryan Allsop	GK	(England)	Birmingham	17 June 1992 (age 34)	–	–	Leyton Orient	18 January 2013	Free	30 June 2016
25	Darryl Flahavan	GK	(England)	Southampton	28 November 1978 (age 47)	–	–	Portsmouth	July 2011	Free	30 June 2014
42	Lee Camp	GK	(Northern Ireland)	Derby (England)	22 August 1984 (age 42)	8	0	West Bromwich Albion	4 January 2014	Free	30 June 2016
Defenders
2	Simon Francis	RB	(England)	Nottingham	16 February 1985 (age 41)	–	–	Charlton Athletic	9 January 2012	Undisclosed	30 June 2016
3	Steve Cook	CB	(England)	Hastings	19 April 1991 (age 35)	–	–	Brighton & Hove Albion	3 January 2012	£158,400	30 June 2016
4	Stéphane Zubar	CB	(Guadeloupe)	Pointe-à-Pitre	9 October 1986 (age 40)	2	0	Free agent	22 September 2011	Free	30 June 2014
5	Tommy Elphick	CB	(England)	Brighton	7 September 1987 (age 39)	–	–	Brighton & Hove Albion	11 August 2012	£220,000	30 June 2015
11	Charlie Daniels	LB	(England)	Harlow	7 September 1986 (age 40)	–	–	Leyton Orient	November 2011	£198,000	30 June 2015
14	Ian Harte	LB	(Republic of Ireland)	Drogheda	31 August 1977 (age 49)	64	12	Reading	1 July 2013	Free	30 June 2014
15	Adam Smith	RB	(England)	London	29 April 1991 (age 35)	–	–	Tottenham Hotspur	28 January 2014	Undisclosed	30 June 2017
22	Elliott Ward	CB	(England)	Harrow	19 January 1985 (age 41)	–	–	Norwich City	1 July 2013	Free	30 June 2014
Midfielders
4	Andrew Surman	LM	(England)	Johannesburg (South Africa)	20 August 1986 (age 40)	–	–	Norwich City	31 July 2013	Loan	31 May 2014
7	Marc Pugh	LM	(England)	Bacup	2 April 1987 (age 39)	–	–	Hereford United	July 2010	£110,000	30 June 2014
8	Harry Arter	CM	(England)	London	28 December 1989 (age 36)	–	–	Woking	July 2010	£123,200	30 June 2014
12	Wes Fogden	RM	(England)	Brighton	12 April 1988 (age 38)	–	–	Havant & Waterlooville	October 2011	Undisclosed	30 June 2015
16	Shaun MacDonald	CM	(Wales)	Swansea	17 June 1988 (age 38)	1	0	Swansea City	25 August 2011	£149,600	30 June 2016
19	Stephen Purches	DM	(England)	London	14 January 1980 (age 46)	–	–	Leyton Orient	July 2010	Free	30 June 2014
20	Ryan Fraser	RM	(Scotland)	Aberdeen	24 February 1994 (age 32)	–	–	Aberdeen	18 January 2013	£422,400	30 June 2016
21	Mohamed Coulibaly	RM	(Senegal)	Bakel	7 August 1988 (age 38)	–	–	FC Grasshoppers	11 July 2013	Undisclosed	30 June 2015
26	Richard Hughes	DM	(Scotland)	Glasgow	25 June 1979 (age 47)	5	0	Free agent	4 August 2012	Free	30 June 2014
30	Matt Ritchie	RM	(Scotland)	Gosport	10 September 1989 (age 37)	–	–	Swindon Town	30 January 2013	£409,200	30 June 2016
32	Eunan O'Kane	CM	(Republic of Ireland)	Derry (Northern Ireland)	10 July 1990 (age 36)	–	–	Torquay United	26 July 2012	Undisclosed	30 June 2015
Forwards
9	Lewis Grabban	CF	(England)	London	12 January 1988 (age 38)	–	–	Rotherham United	1 July 2012	£325,600	30 June 2016
10	Brett Pitman	CF	(Jersey)	St Helier	31 January 1988 (age 38)	–	–	Bristol City	3 January 2013	Undisclosed	30 June 2016
15	Wes Thomas	CF	(England)	London	23 January 1987 (age 39)	-	-	Crawley Town	1 January 2012	Undisclosed	30 June 2014
17	Josh McQuoid	RW	(Northern Ireland)	Southampton (England)	15 December 1989 (age 36)	5	0	Millwall	1 July 2012	Player swap	30 June 2015
18	Yann Kermorgant	FW	(France)	Vannes	8 November 1981 (age 45)	–	–	Charlton Athletic	January 2014	Undisclosed	30 June 2016
23	Donal McDermott	LW	(Republic of Ireland)	Dublin	19 October 1989 (age 37)	–	–	Huddersfield Town	January 2012	Undisclosed	30 June 2015
28	Tokelo Rantie	CF	(South Africa)	Parys	8 September 1990 (age 36)	15	4	Malmö FF	28 August 2013	£3,520,000	30 June 2015

=== Statistics ===
As of 3 May 2014

No.	Pos	Nat	Player	Total		Championship		FA Cup		League Cup	
No.	Pos	Nat	Player	Apps	Goals	Apps	Goals	Apps	Goals	Apps	Goals
1	GK	(England) ENG	Ryan Allsop	15	0	11+1	0	1	0	2	0
2	DF	(England) ENG	Simon Francis	50	1	45+1	1	2	0	2	0
3	DF	(England) ENG	Steve Cook	40	3	38	3	1	0	1	0
4	MF	(England) ENG	Andrew Surman (on loan from Norwich City)	39	0	30+5	0	1+1	0	2	0
5	DF	(England) ENG	Tommy Elphick	42	2	34+4	1	2	1	2	0
6	MF	(Wales) WAL	Joe Partington	0	0	0	0	0	0	0	0
7	MF	(England) ENG	Marc Pugh	45	5	32+10	5	1+1	0	1	0
8	MF	(England) ENG	Harry Arter	34	3	31	3	2	0	0+1	0
9	FW	(England) ENG	Lewis Grabban	46	22	43+1	22	1+1	0	0	0
10	FW	Jersey	Brett Pitman	37	7	12+22	5	1+1	2	1	0
11	DF	(England) ENG	Charlie Daniels	26	0	22+1	0	2	0	0+1	0
12	MF	(England) ENG	Wes Fogden	0	0	0	0	0	0	0	0
13	GK	(England) ENG	Shwan Jalal	0	0	0	0	0	0	0	0
14	DF	(Republic of Ireland) IRL	Ian Harte	26	1	22+2	1	0	0	2	0
15	DF	(England) ENG	Adam Smith	5	0	1+4	0	0	0	0	0
16	MF	(Wales) WAL	Shaun MacDonald	25	0	11+12	0	0	0	1+1	0
17	FW	(Northern Ireland) NIR	Josh McQuoid	1	0	1	0	0	0	0	0
18	FW	(France) FRA	Yann Kermorgant	16	9	11+5	9	0	0	0	0
19	DF	(England) ENG	Stephen Purches	0	0	0	0	0	0	0	0
20	MF	(Scotland) SCO	Ryan Fraser	41	5	23+14	4	0+2	1	2	0
21	FW	(France) FRA	Mohamed Coulibaly	8	0	2+5	0	0	0	0+1	0
22	DF	(England) ENG	Elliott Ward	25	0	22+1	0	1	0	1	0
23	MF	(Republic of Ireland) IRL	Donal McDermott	2	0	0	0	0	0	1+1	0
24	DF	(England) ENG	Miles Addison	0	0	0	0	0	0	0	0
25	GK	(England) ENG	Darryl Flahavan	1	0	0+1	0	0	0	0	0
26	MF	(Scotland) SCO	Richard Hughes	7	0	1+4	0	0	0	2	0
27	MF	(England) ENG	Sam Matthews	0	0	0	0	0	0	0	0
28	FW	(South Africa) RSA	Tokelo Rantie	31	3	14+15	3	1+1	0	0	0
30	MF	(England) ENG	Matt Ritchie	32	9	28+2	9	2	0	0	0
32	MF	(Republic of Ireland) IRL	Eunan O'Kane	40	2	32+5	1	1+1	0	1	1
42	GK	(Northern Ireland) NIR	Lee Camp (on loan from West Bromwich Albion)	34	0	33	0	1	0	0	0
Players currently out on loan:
18	FW	(England) ENG	Matt Tubbs (at Rotherham United)	0	0	0	0	0	0	0	0
29	FW	(England) ENG	Jayden Stockley (at Leyton Orient)	0	0	0	0	0	0	0	0
Players who left the club during the season:
15	FW	(England) ENG	Wesley Thomas	12	0	1+9	0	0	0	1+1	0
31	MF	(Wales) WAL	Jack Collison (on loan from West Ham United)	4	0	4	0	0	0	0	0
35	GK	(Republic of Ireland) IRL	Stephen Henderson (on loan from West Ham United)	2	0	2	0	0	0	0	0

==== Goalscorers ====
As of 3 May 2014

Rank	No.	Pos.	Name	Championship	FA Cup	League Cup	Total
1	9	FW	Lewis Grabban	22	0	0	22
2	18	FW	Yann Kermorgant	9	0	0	9
2	30	MF	Matt Ritchie	9	0	0	9
4	10	FW	Brett Pitman	5	2	0	7
5	7	MF	Marc Pugh	5	0	0	5
6	20	MF	Ryan Fraser	3	1	0	4
7	28	FW	Tokelo Rantie	3	0	0	3
7	8	MF	Harry Arter	3	0	0	3
7	3	DF	Steve Cook	3	0	0	3
10	32	MF	Eunan O'Kane	1	0	1	2
10	5	DF	Tommy Elphick	1	1	0	2
12	2	DF	Simon Francis	1	0	0	1
12	14	DF	Ian Harte	1	0	0	1
12	Own Goal			1	0	0	1
Total				67	4	1	72

==== Disciplinary record ====
As of 3 May 2014

No.	Pos.	Name	Championship			FA Cup			League Cup			Total		
No.	Pos.	Name	Yellow card	(yellow card) (yellow-red card)	Red card	Yellow card	(yellow card) (yellow-red card)	Red card	Yellow card	(yellow card) (yellow-red card)	Red card	Yellow card	(yellow card) (yellow-red card)	Red card
1	GK	Ryan Allsop	3	0	1	0	0	0	0	0	0	3	0	1
2	DF	Simon Francis	6	0	0	0	0	0	0	0	0	6	0	0
3	DF	Steve Cook	5	0	0	0	0	0	0	0	0	5	0	0
4	MF	Andrew Surman	2	0	0	0	0	0	0	0	0	2	0	0
5	DF	Tommy Elphick	5	0	0	0	0	0	1	0	0	6	0	0
7	MF	Marc Pugh	3	0	0	0	0	0	0	0	0	3	0	0
8	MF	Harry Arter	8	0	1	0	0	0	0	0	0	8	0	1
9	FW	Lewis Grabban	1	0	0	0	0	0	0	0	0	1	0	0
10	FW	Brett Pitman	6	0	0	0	0	0	0	0	0	6	0	0
11	DF	Charlie Daniels	2	0	0	0	0	0	0	0	0	2	0	0
14	DF	Ian Harte	2	0	0	0	0	0	0	0	0	2	0	0
15	DF	Adam Smith	1	0	0	0	0	0	0	0	0	1	0	0
16	MF	Shaun MacDonald	3	0	0	0	0	0	0	0	0	3	0	0
18	FW	Yann Kermorgant	1	0	0	0	0	0	0	0	0	1	0	0
20	MF	Ryan Fraser	2	0	0	0	0	0	0	0	0	2	0	0
22	DF	Elliott Ward	1	1	0	0	0	0	0	0	0	1	1	0
26	MF	Richard Hughes	1	1	0	0	0	0	1	0	0	2	1	0
28	FW	Tokelo Rantie	1	0	0	0	0	0	0	0	0	1	0	0
30	MF	Matt Ritchie	5	0	0	1	0	0	0	0	0	6	0	0
31	MF	Jack Collison	1	0	0	0	0	0	0	0	0	1	0	0
32	MF	Eunan O'Kane	3	0	0	0	0	0	0	0	0	3	0	0
42	GK	Lee Camp	3	0	0	0	0	0	0	0	0	3	0	0
Total			65	2	2	1	0	0	2	0	0	68	2	2

=== Contracts ===
No.	Pos.	Nat.	Name	Age	Status	Contract length	Expiry date	Source
37	GK	(Liechtenstein)	Benjamin Büchel	23	Signed	1 year	June 2014	BBC Sport
25	GK	(England)	Darryl Flahavan	34	Signed	1 year	June 2014	BBC Sport
6	MF	(Wales) (England)	Joe Partington	23	Signed	2 years	June 2015	Bournemouth Official Site
3	DF	(England)	Steve Cook	22	Signed	3 years	June 2016	Dorset Echo
2	DF	(England)	Simon Francis	28	Signed	3 years	June 2016	BBC Sport
9	FW	(England)	Lewis Grabban	25	Signed	3 years	June 2016	

== Transfers ==
=== Transfers in ===
No.	Pos.	Nat.	Name	Age	EU	Moving from	Type	Transfer window	Ends	Transfer fee	Source
22	DF	(England)	Elliott Ward	28	EU	Norwich City	Free Transfer	Summer	2015	Free	BBC Sport
14	DF	(Republic of Ireland)	Ian Harte	35	EU	Reading	Free Transfer	Summer	2014	Free	BBC Sport
21	FW	(France)	Mohamed Coulibaly	24	EU	Grasshoppers (Switzerland)	Free Transfer	Summer	2015	Free	BBC Sport
4	MF	(England) (South Africa)	Andrew Surman	26	EU	Norwich City	Loan	Summer	2014	Season Long Loan	Sky Sports
28	FW	(South Africa)	Tokelo Rantie	22	EU	Malmö FF (Sweden)	Transfer	Summer	Undisclosed	Undisclosed	BBC Sport

- Total income: ▼ – Undisclosed

=== Loans in ===
No.	Pos.	Name	Country	Age	Loan club	Started	Ended	Start source	End source
31	MF	Jack Collison	(Wales) (England)	37	West Ham United	1 October	November	BBC Sport	
35	GK	Stephen Henderson	(Republic of Ireland)	25	West Ham United	2 October	31 October	BBC Sport	BBC Sport
42	GK	Lee Camp	(Northern Ireland) (England)	42	West Bromwich Albion	31 October		BBC Sport	

Sources: For loan start source see "Start source". For loan end source see "End source".
EU = if holds or not a European Union passport; Country: when 2 flags, 1st flag = country that plays for internationally, 2nd flag = country of birth; No. = number on jersey; P = Position (for position name, pause mouse pointer on abbreviation); Name = Name on jersey (for more extensive name, pause mouse pointer on name); In/Out = In: The player came in on loan, Out: The player went out on loan; Loan club = the club that the player moved on loan to or the club that the player came from on loan; Started = the date when the player's loan started; Ended = the date when the player's loan ended.

=== Transfers out ===
No.	Pos.	Name	Country	Age	Type	Moving to	Transfer window	Transfer fee	Apps	Goals	Source
10	FW	Charlie Sheringham	(England)	25	Contract Ended	AFC Wimbledon	Summer	Free	7	1	Bournemouth Official Site
33	FW	Steve Fletcher	(England)	40	Contract Ended	Retired	Summer	N/A	527	54	BBC Sport
27	MF	Jonathan Meades	(Wales) (England)	21	Contract Terminated	Oxford United	Summer	Free	0	0	BBC Sport
14	FW	Frank Demouge	(Netherlands)	31	Contract Terminated	Roda JC (Netherlands)	Summer	Free	2	0	Sky Sports

EU = if holds or not a European Union passport; Country: when 2 flags, 1st flag = country that plays for internationally, 2nd flag = country of birth; N = number on jersey; P = Position (for position name, pause mouse pointer on abbreviation); Name = Name on jersey (for more extensive name, pause mouse pointer on name); Age = age on the day of the signing; Moving from = only indicate the club the player was playing before start playing for this club in this season, for the type of the moving see Status column; Moving to = only indicates the club the player is going to play next, for the type of the moving see Status column; Ends = when the player's current contract ends; n/a = Not applicable; Apps = Total number of competitive appearances (including substitute appearances) at the club prior to departure; Goals = Total number of competitive goals scored at the club prior to departure.
- Total income: ▲ ~ £0

=== Loans out ===
No.	Pos.	Name	Country	Age	Loan club	Started	Ended	Start source	End source
18	FW	Matt Tubbs	(England)	42	Rotherham United	27 July	January	BBC Sport	
29	FW	Jayden Stockley	(England)	33	Leyton Orient	2 September	5 October	BBC Sport	
13	GK	Shwan Jalal	(England) (Iraq)	30	Oxford United	12 September	2 October	BBC Sport	BBC Sport

Sources: For loan start source see "Start source". For loan end source see "End source".
EU = if holds or not a European Union passport; Country: when 2 flags, 1st flag = country that plays for internationally, 2nd flag = country of birth; No. = number on jersey; P = Position (for position name, pause mouse pointer on abbreviation); Name = Name on jersey (for more extensive name, pause mouse pointer on name); In/Out = In: The player came in on loan, Out: The player went out on loan; Loan club = the club that the player moved on loan to or the club that the player came from on loan; Started = the date when the player's loan started; Ended = the date when the player's loan ended.

== Pre-season and Friendlies ==
=== Pre-season friendlies ===
5 July 2013 Swiss Tour	FC Zürich	2–0	Bournemouth	Horgen
18:00 BST	Gavranović 24'; Schönbächler 90'			Stadium: Sportanlage Waldegg; Attendance: 2,000

9 July 2013	Christchurch	1–7	Bournemouth	Christchurch
19:45 BST	Purdy 10'	Report	8' Pitman; 34', 36' Arter; 44' Stockley; 57' Grabban; 76' Cargill; 79' McDermott	Stadium: Hurn Bridge; Attendance: 700

10 July 2013	Bashley	0–3	Bournemouth	Bashley
19:45 BST			Carmichael 5'; Bassele 37'; Chiedozie 64'	Stadium: The Recreation Ground

13 July 2013	Bournemouth	0–2	West Ham United	Bournemouth
15:00 BST		Report	Nolan 8'; Collison 45'	Stadium: Dean Court; Attendance: 7,080

21 July 2013	Bournemouth	0–6	Real Madrid	Bournemouth
19:45 BST		Report	Ronaldo 21', 40'; Khedira 43'; Higuaín 46'; Di María 68'; Casemiro 83'	Stadium: Dean Court; Attendance: 11,772

23 July 2013	Bournemouth	2–1	Portsmouth	Bournemouth
19:45 BST	Coulibaly 34'; Cornick 81'	Report	Barcham	Stadium: Dean Court; Attendance: 1,806

27 July 2013	Bournemouth	0–0	Bristol City	Bournemouth
15:00 BST		Report		Stadium: Dean Court

== Fixtures and results ==
=== Championship ===
3 August 2013 1	Bournemouth	2–1	Charlton Athletic	Bournemouth
15:00 BST	Grabban 27', 66'	Report	49' Kermorgant	Stadium: Dean Court; Attendance: 10,108

10 August 2013 2	Watford	6–1	Bournemouth	Watford
15:00 BST	Angella 13', 53'; Deeney 56', 88', 90' (pen.); McGugan 66'	Report	30' Grabban	Stadium: Vicarage Road; Attendance: 16,295

17 August 2013 3	Bournemouth	1–0	Wigan Athletic	Bournemouth
15:00 BST	Grabban 43'	Report	(red card) 59' McManaman	Stadium: Dean Court; Attendance: 9,097

26 August 2013 4	Huddersfield Town	5–1	Bournemouth	Huddersfield
15:00 BST	Hammill 14'; Vaughan 47', 42', 58' (pen.); Clayton 78'	Report	68' Pugh	Stadium: Galpharm Stadium; Attendance: 12,025

31 August 2013 5	Doncaster Rovers	0–1	Bournemouth	Doncaster
15:00 BST		Report	31' Pitman	Stadium: Keepmoat Stadium; Attendance: 6,769

14 September 2013 6	Bournemouth	1–2	Blackpool	Bournemouth
15:00 BST	Grabban 12'	Report	7' Fuller; 48' Bishop; (yellow card) 28' (yellow-red card) 59' Robinson	Stadium: Dean Court; Attendance: 9,446; Referee: Langford

17 September 2013 7	Bournemouth	1–0	Barnsley	Bournemouth
19:45 BST	Pugh 78'	Report		Stadium: Dean Court; Attendance: 7,574; Referee: Malone

21 September 2013 8	Middlesbrough	3–3	Bournemouth	Middlesbrough
15:00 BST	Kamara 20'; Carayol 32'; Leadbitter 75'; Williams (red card) 86'	Report	4' (pen.), 12' (pen.) Pitman; 83' (o.g.) Woodgate	Stadium: Riverside Stadium; Attendance: 13,617; Referee: Salisbury

28 September 2013 9	Bournemouth	1–3	Blackburn Rovers	Bournemouth
15:00 BST	Hughes (yellow card) 46' (yellow-red card) 52'Fraser 74'	Report	10', 41' (pen.) Rhodes; 41' Best	Stadium: Dean Court; Attendance: 9,441; Referee: Lewis

1 October 2013 10	Leeds United	2–1	Bournemouth	Leeds
19:45 BST	McCormack 52'; Poleon 80'	Report	(red card) 30' Allsop; 73' Grabban	Stadium: Elland Road; Attendance: 21,749; Referee: David Coote

5 October 2013 11	Bournemouth	5–2	Millwall	Bournemouth
15:00 BST	Fraser 43'; Cook 50'; Arter 55'; Grabban 59' (pen.); Pitman 90' (pen.)	Report	6' Waghorn; 10' Trotter; (yellow card) 14' (yellow-red card) 59' Dunne	Stadium: Dean Court; Attendance: 9,624; Referee: Lee Collins

19 October 2013 12	Nottingham Forest	1–1	Bournemouth	Nottingham
15:00 BST	Lansbury 39'	Report	90' Pugh	Stadium: City Ground; Attendance: 28,070; Referee: Phil Gibbs

26 October 2013 13	Leicester City	2–1	Bournemouth	Leicester
15:00 BST	Nugent 18'; Vardy 81'	Report	38' Pugh; (yellow card) 9' (yellow-red card) 66' Ward	Stadium: King Power Stadium; Attendance: 23,357; Referee: Andy Davies

2 November 2013 14	Bournemouth	0–2	Bolton Wanderers	Bournemouth
15:00 BST		Report	37' N'gog; 90' Beckford	Stadium: Dean Court; Attendance: 10,015; Referee: Darren Deadman

9 November 2013 15	Burnley	1–1	Bournemouth	Burnley
15:00 BST	Ings 84'	Report	50' Rantie	Stadium: Turf Moor; Attendance: 12,221; Referee: Mike Russell

23 November 2013 16	Bournemouth	0–1	Derby County	Bournemouth
15:00		Report	Ward 61'	Stadium: Dean Court; Attendance: 10,720 (1,391 away fans); Referee: Stephen Martin

30 November 2013 17	Bournemouth	1–1	Brighton & Hove Albion	Bournemouth
12:15	Ritchie 29'	Report	Barnes 55'	Stadium: Dean Court; Attendance: 9,870

3 December 2013 18	Queens Park Rangers	3–0	Bournemouth	London
7:45 GMT	Austin 27'; Hoilett 54'; Phillips 77'	Report		Stadium: Loftus Road; Attendance: 16,331; Referee: A. Woolmer

7 December 2013 19	Reading	1–2	Bournemouth	Reading
15:00 GMT (UTC)	Le Fondre 90+1'	Report	Grabban 37'; Ritchie 41'	Stadium: Dean Court; Attendance: 20,944; Referee: David Coote

14 December 2013 20	Bournemouth	0–2	Birmingham City	Bournemouth
15:00 GMT (UTC)		Report	Shinnie 3'; Žigić 34'	Stadium: Dean Court; Attendance: 9,256; Referee: Michael Naylor

21 December 2013 21	Sheffield Wednesday	1–2	Bournemouth	Sheffield
15:00	Réda Johnson (yellow card) 46'; Maghoma 82'	Report	Ritchie 10'; Grabban 27'; Elphick (yellow card) 71'	Stadium: Hillsborough Stadium; Attendance: 21,057

26 December 2013 22	Bournemouth	3–0	Yeovil Town	Bournemouth
15:00	Ritchie 50' 57'; O'Kane 65'	Report		Stadium: Dean Court; Attendance: 10,717; Referee: Craig Pawson

29 December 2013 23	Bournemouth	1–1	Ipswich Town	Bournemouth
15:00	Pitman 74'	Report	Murphy 59'; Hyam (yellow card) 79'	Stadium: Dean Court; Attendance: 11,096; Referee: Phil Gibbs

1 January 2014 24	Brighton & Hove Albion	1–1	Bournemouth	Brighton
15:00	El-Abd (yellow card) 63'; Bridcutt (yellow card) 74'; Stephen Ward 89'	Report	Grabban 14' (pen.); Arter (yellow card) 31'	Stadium: Falmer Stadium; Attendance: 28,282; Referee: Simon Hooper

11 January 2014 25	Wigan Athletic	3–0	Bournemouth	Wigan
15.00 GMT	Fortuné 5'; McCann (yellow card) 40'; Ward 58' (o.g.); Jordi Gómez 90'	Report		Stadium: DW Stadium; Attendance: 12,709; Referee: Geoff Eltringham

18 January 2014 26	Bournemouth	1–1	Watford	Bournemouth
15:00	Ritchie (yellow card) 12'; Grabban 62' (pen.), (penalty missed) 72'; Pitman (yellow card) 81'	Report	Angella 45+2', (red card) 61'; Almunia (yellow card) 72'	Stadium: Dean Court; Attendance: 10,353; Referee: Carl Boyeson

28 January 2014 27	Bournemouth	2–1	Huddersfield Town	Bournemouth
19:45	Grabban 55' (pen.); Rantie 72' (yellow card) 73'	Report	Smith (yellow card) 54'; Woods 59'; Southern (yellow card) 63'; Norwood (yellow card) 75'	Stadium: Goldsands Stadium; Attendance: 7,258; Referee: Graham Horwood

1 February 2014 28	Bournemouth	0–1	Leicester City	Bournemouth
15:00 GMT	Ward (yellow card) 53'; Arter (yellow card) 66'; Camp (yellow card) 81'	Report	Wasilewksi (yellow card) 67'; Phillips 81'	Stadium: Dean Court; Attendance: 10,719; Referee: Darren Drysdale

8 February 2014 29	Bolton Wanderers	2–2	Bournemouth	Bolton
15:00 GMT	C.Y. Lee 21'; Jutkiewicz 32'; Ream (yellow card) 75'	Report	Grabban 34'; Francis 66' (yellow card) 81'	Stadium: Reebok Stadium; Attendance: 14,336; Referee: Andy Madley

15 February 2014 30	Bournemouth	1–1	Burnley	Bournemouth
15:00 GMT	Rantie 51'; Pitman (yellow card) 88'; Kermorgant (yellow card) 90+1'	Report	Treacy 67'	Stadium: Dean Court; Attendance: 10,422; Referee: Graham Scott

22 February 2014 31	Derby County	1–0	Bournemouth	Derby
15:00	Buxton (yellow card) 60'; Forsyth (yellow card) 79'; Martin 85'	Report	Camp (yellow card) 51'; Arter (yellow card) 81'; Elphick (yellow card) 84'; Francis (yellow card) 89'	Stadium: iPro Stadium; Attendance: 27,306; Referee: Mark Heywood

1 March 2014 32	Bournemouth	5–0	Doncaster Rovers	Bournemouth
15:00 GMT	Kermorgant 26', 43', 73'; Arter 50', 82'	Report	Keegan (yellow card) 24'; Tamaș (yellow card) 58'; Khumalo (yellow card) 64'	Stadium: Dean Court; Attendance: 8,983; Referee: Darren Sheldrake

8 March 2014 33	Blackpool	0–1	Bournemouth	Blackpool
15:00	Perkins (yellow card) 44'; Gilks (yellow card) 47'	Report	Grabban 48' (pen.)	Stadium: Bloomfield Road; Attendance: 13,043; Referee: Gavin Ward

12 March 2014 34	Blackburn Rovers	0–1	Bournemouth	Blackburn
19:45 GMT		Report	Ritchie (yellow card) 45+1'; Grabban 67'	Stadium: Ewood Park; Attendance: 13,081; Referee: David Webb

15 March 2014 35	Bournemouth	0–0	Middlesbrough	Bournemouth
15:00 GMT	O'Kane (yellow card) 73'	Report	Leadbitter (yellow card) 19'; Whitehead (yellow card) 41'; Omeruo (yellow card) 90+7'	Stadium: Dean Court; Attendance: 9,710; Referee: Fred Graham

18 March 2014 36	Charlton Athletic	1–0	Bournemouth	London
19:45 GMT	Wiggins (yellow card) 57'; Obika (yellow card) 73'; Dervite 90+2'; Jackson (yellow card) 90+3'; Church (yellow card) 90+5'	Report	Elphick (yellow card) 90+1'	Stadium: The Valley; Attendance: 13,537; Referee: James Linington

22 March 2014 37	Barnsley	0–1	Bournemouth	Barnsley
15:00 GMT	Hunt (yellow card) 45+1'; Nyatanga (yellow card) 80'	Report	Ritchie (yellow card) 45+1'; Cook 90+4'	Stadium: Oakwell; Attendance: 9,392; Referee: Scott Mathieson

25 March 2014 38	Bournemouth	4–1	Leeds United	Bournemouth
19:45 GMT	Kermonrgant 2', 51'; Grabban 18', 28'	Report	McCormack 69'	Stadium: Dean Court; Attendance: 10,109; Referee: James Adcock

29 March 2014 39	Birmingham City	2–4	Bournemouth	Birmingham
15:00 GMT	Randolph (yellow card) 28'; Macheda 57', 73'; Caddis (yellow card) 85'	Report	Ritchie 13'; Grabban 20', 28' (pen.), (yellow card) 90'; Harte 52'	Stadium: St Andrew's; Attendance: 13,875; Referee: Mike Russell

5 April 2014 40	Bournemouth	2–1	Queens Park Rangers	Bournemouth
15:00 BST	Elphick 45+1'; Grabban 60'; Arter (red card) 68'; Harte (yellow card) 78'	Report	Traoré 46'; Morrison (yellow card) 84'; Dunne (yellow card) 90+1'	Stadium: Dean Court; Attendance: 11,307; Referee: Jon Moss

8 April 2014 41	Bournemouth	3–1	Reading	Bournemouth
19:45 BST	Ritchie 7', 19'; Kermorgant 45'; Fraser (yellow card) 81'	Report	Robson-Kanu 75'; Obita (yellow card) 83'	Stadium: Dean Court; Attendance: 11,182; Referee: Andy Woolmer

12 April 2014 42	Yeovil Town	1–1	Bournemouth	Yeovil
15:00 BST	Moore 26'; McAllister (yellow card) 86'	Report	Fraser 59'; Francis (yellow card) 62'; Cook (yellow card) 71'	Stadium: Huish Park; Attendance: 6,931; Referee: Bobby Madley

18 April 2014 43	Bournemouth	2–4	Sheffield Wednesday	Bournemouth
15:00 BST	Surman (yellow card) 15'; Pugh 31'; Kermorgant 57'; Elphick (yellow card) 84'	Report	Nuhiu 16'; Hutchinson 34' (yellow card) 45+1' (red card) 63'; Maguire (yellow card) 71' (goal) 90+6'; Best 86'	Stadium: Dean Court; Attendance: 10,864; Referee: Tim Robinson

21 April 2014 44	Ipswich Town	2–2	Bournemouth	Ipswich
15.00 BST	Anderson 36'; Green 56'	Report	Cook 44'; Ritchie 80'	Stadium: Portman Road; Attendance: 20,356; Referee: Andy D'Urso

26 April 2014 45	Bournemouth	4–1	Nottingham Forest	Bournemouth
15:00 BST	Kermorgant 43', 90+1'; Grabban 47', 70' (pen.); Cook (yellow card) 88'	Report	56' Halford; (yellow card) 62' Lascelles; (yellow card) 74' Harding	Stadium: Dean Court; Attendance: 11,021; Referee: Simon Hooper

3 May 2014 46	Millwall	1–0	Bournemouth	London
15:00 BST	Beevers (yellow card) 12'; Woolford 28', (yellow card) 45+2'; Bailey (yellow card) 44'	Report	Smith (yellow card) 45+1'; Ritchie (yellow card) 81'	Stadium: The Den; Attendance: 15,779; Referee: 15,779

=== League Cup ===
6 August 2013 Round 1	Bournemouth	1–0	Portsmouth	Bournemouth
19:45 BST	O'Kane 54'	Report		Stadium: Dean Court; Attendance: 7,620; Referee: Graham

28 August 2013 Round 2	Watford	2–0	Bournemouth	Watford
19:45 BST	Ward 13' (o.g.); Battocchio 66'	Report		Stadium: Vicarage Road; Attendance: 9,824; Referee: Deadman

=== FA Cup ===
4 January 2014 Third round	Bournemouth	P–P	Burton Albion	Bournemouth
15:00				Stadium: Dean Court

14 January 2014 Third round	Bournemouth	4–1	Burton Albion	Bournemouth
19:45	Pitman 5', 88'; Elphick 45'; Ritchie (yellow card) 52'; Fraser 86'	Report	Edwards (yellow card) 29'; Phillips 35'	Stadium: Dean Court; Attendance: 10,343; Referee: Iain Williamson

25 January 2014 Fourth round	Bournemouth	0–2	Liverpool	Bournemouth
12:45 GMT		Report	Moses 26'; Sturridge 60'; Gerrard (yellow card) 57'	Stadium: Dean Court; Attendance: 11,475; Referee: Lee Probert

== Overall summary ==
=== Summary ===
As of 3 May 2014

Games played	50 (46 Championship, 2 FA Cup, 2 League Cup)
Games won	20 (18 Championship, 1 FA Cup, 1 League Cup)
Games drawn	12 (12 Championship, 0 FA Cup, 0 League Cup)
Games lost	18 (16 Championship, 1 FA Cup, 1 League Cup)
Goals scored	72 (67 Championship, 4 FA Cup, 1 League Cup)
Goals conceded	71 (66 Championship, 3 FA Cup, 2 League Cup)
Goal difference	1
Clean sheets	10 (9 Championship, 0 FA Cup, 1 League Cup)
Yellow cards	68 (65 Championship, 1 FA Cup, 2 League Cup)
Second yellow cards	2 (2 Championship, 0 FA Cup, 0 League Cup)
Red cards	2 (2 Championship, 0 FA Cup, 0 League Cup)
Worst discipline	Harry Arter (8 (yellow card) , 1 (red card) )
Best result	5–0 vs Doncaster Rovers
Worst result	1–6 vs Watford
Most appearances	Simon Francis (50 appearances)
Top scorer	Lewis Grabban (22 goals)
Points	66

=== Score overview ===
As of 3 May 2014

Opposition	Home score	Away score	Double	Point allocated
Barnsley	1–0	1–0	Yes	6
Birmingham City	0–2	4–2	No	3
Blackburn Rovers	1–3	1–0	No	3
Blackpool	1–2	1–0	No	3
Brighton & Hove Albion	1–1	1–1	No	2
Bolton Wanderers	0–2	2–2	No	1
Burnley	1–1	1–1	No	2
Charlton Athletic	2–1	0–1	No	3
Derby County	0–1	0–1	No	0
Doncaster Rovers	5–0	1–0	Yes	6
Huddersfield Town	2–1	1–5	No	3
Ipswich Town	1–1	2–2	No	2
Leeds United	4–1	1–2	No	3
Leicester City	0–1	1–2	No	0
Middlesbrough	0–0	3–3	No	2
Millwall	5–2	0–1	No	3
Nottingham Forest	4–1	1–1	No	4
Queens Park Rangers	2–1	0–3	No	3
Reading	3–1	2–1	Yes	6
Sheffield Wednesday	2–4	2–1	No	3
Watford	1–1	1–6	No	1
Wigan Athletic	1–0	0–3	No	3
Yeovil Town	3–0	1–1	No	4
