= Non-Religious Pastoral Support Network =

Organisation

- Abbreviation: NRPSN
- Formation: 2016
- Founder: Humanists UK
- Board of directors: Lindsay Van Dijk (chair)
- Website: nrpsn.org.uk

The Non-Religious Pastoral Support Network (NRPSN) is an organisation supporting a network of people who work in non-religious pastoral care which also promotes and advocates for non-religious pastoral care provision within the UK in institutions such as the NHS and HM Prison and Probation Service (HMPPS), the British Armed Forces and within the British education system.

It was formed in 2016 and the current chair is Lindsay Van Dijk. The current head of pastoral support at Humanists UK is Clare Elcombe Webber, who is responsible for developing the organisation. Six other people make up the governing board within the constitution of the organisation.

== History ==
NRPSN was set up in 2016 as part of Humanists UK under the name Humanist Care. It originated partly in response to a British Social Attitudes Survey which concluded that 53% of people in Britain considered themselves to have no religion, and from what Humanists UK perceived to be a huge demand for trained non-religious people in the field of pastoral care to meet the needs of this demographic, both as recipients and providers of care.

People within the organisation refer to themselves as a "non-religious pastoral carer" rather than the traditional equivalent, chaplain, which is deemed to have religious overtones, and this led to the name Non-Religious Pastoral Support Network. Humanist Care now remains as the website for general enquiry and NRPSN for accredited volunteers and professionals and is headed by Jessica Grace.

== Non-religious pastoral care in the UK ==
Following an equality analysis by NHS England, within the NHS pastoral care provision is covered by guidelines drawn up by National Institute for Health and Care Excellence (NICE) to ensure equality and standards of practice are met in the provision of spiritual and religious care in, for example, hospitals and hospices. In 2018, palliative care charity Marie Curie released a report which highlighted some of the deficits in pastoral care provision which included provision for people with learning disabilities, dementia and people with no religion. The three-year project which covered terminal patients in Cardiff and the Vale of Glamorgan summarised, "Many non-religious participants felt that concerns around how we provide spiritual care for the non- religious would be a barrier to their access to care. People said they fear "religious evangelism and attempts to convert during times of extreme emotional stress" or simply a lack of any provision of support for non-religious people based on an assumption that they would not need spiritual support."

The appointment of the first ever humanist pastoral carer and member of NRPSN, Jane Flint, within the chaplaincy at University Hospitals of Leicester NHS Trust took place on 4 January 2016. Flint's post was originally funded by Leicester Hospitals Charity but since January 2017 has been funded by the NHS.

In April 2018 Lindsay van Dijk, quality assurance officer and board member of NRPSN, was appointed the first non-religious head chaplain at Buckinghamshire Healthcare NHS Trust. Van Dijk's appointment was criticised by Tim Dieppe of Christian pressure group Christian Concern who said "It's a further move away from the Christian principles upon which the NHS was founded." Elsewhere, Humanists UK has pointed out that the NHS's founders (Bevan, Attlee, and Beveridge) were in fact self-identified humanists.

In the UK, NHS trusts are required to fund and account for chaplains according to the demographic of the population served by the trust. Canon Michael Brown (Church of England) said "those appointing chaplains have to give a clear reason if an appointment is specifically designated as requiring someone of a particular religious denomination or belief. This might be to reflect, for example, the makeup of the local population."

British military pastoral care is provided by the Royal Army Chaplains' Department, Royal Air Force Chaplains Branch and Royal Navy Chaplaincy Service. The NRPSN advocated for this in conjunction with the Defence Humanists and Defence Secular Society. In 2025, the first humanist pastoral carer, Neil Weddell, was appointed in the Armed Forces, joining the Royal Army Chaplains' Department.

Following an initial pilot programme at HMP Winchester, NRPSN now has volunteers working within Winchester prison and across several other British prisons, and is working with the National Offender Management Service to increase provision although numbers have not been published.

== See also ==
- Clinical pastoral education
- Military Religious Freedom Foundation
- Palliative care
- Secular humanism
- The Clergy Project
