= Pastoral care =

Model of emotional, social and spiritual support

In religious ministry, pastoral care refers to the relationship between a minister and their congregation or community, while in secular contexts the term applies to similar caring relationships and in healthcare settings, it also refers to the provision of emotional and spiritual support to patients, visitors, and staff. Services may include listening to life stories, conducting memorial services, providing companionship, or offering one-on-one time with patients. The specific activities vary depending on whether the care provider follows a religious tradition or operates from a secular framework. Modern institutional pastoral care includes multi-faith, secular, and humanist approaches, and the term "pastoral care" has evolved from its historical association with Christian ministry.

== Religious ministry ==
=== History ===
Within Christianity, pastoral care, modeled on the biblical stories of Jesus healing others, has been practiced since the formation of the Christian Church.

The New Testament does not explicitly define the role of a pastor but associates it with teaching or "shepherding the flock". Harold Rowdon, of the London School of Theology, suggests that "shepherding" involves

protection, tending to needs, strengthening the weak, encouragement, feeding the flock, making provision, shielding, refreshing, restoring, leading by example to move people on in their pursuit of holiness, comforting, [and] guiding.

In the early church, the term poimenic was used to describe this task of soul-care. In the New Testament, the interactions described with the term "pastoral care" are also described with Paraklesis (Greek: παράκλησις paráklēsis), which broadly means "accompaniment", "encouragement", "admonition", and "consolation" (e.g., Romans 12:8; Philippians 2:1; 1 Timothy 4:13; 1 Thessalonians 5:14).

In the ancient church, pastoral care primarily revolved around the Christians' struggle against sin, which jeopardized their ultimate salvation. The theologians Clement of Alexandria, Origen, and Eusebius of Caesarea understood this as mainly the concern of individuals for their own souls. Increasingly, the role of pastoral caregivers was seen as assisting individual Christians in this endeavor.

The first pastoral movement emerged among the Desert Fathers, who were often visited by Christians seeking advice, though this was not yet referred to as pastoral care. Similarly, the early monastic-like communities served as such pastoral care centers. The letters of Basil of Ancyra, Gregory of Nazianzus, and John Chrysostom contain numerous examples of pastoral counsel; the term "pastoral care" shifted towards a concern for the souls of others.

The priestly obligations of Orthodox clergy were outlined by John Chrysostom (347–407) in his treatise On the Priesthood (De Sacerdotio). This work is considered one of the first pastoral works ever written, although Chrysostom was only a deacon at the time.

At the transition to the Middle Ages, Gregory the Great composed the Liber Regulae Pastoris (The Book of the Shepherd's Rules) directed towards the pope, one of the most influential books on pastoral care (cura).

During the Middle Ages, pastoral care was closely tied to the practice of the sacrament of penance, which included confession of sins, making amends, and absolution by the priest. Against the often mechanized routine, particularly from the monastic tradition, efforts were made to address this, such as by Bernard of Clairvaux. The Latin term cura animarum (care of souls) emerged as the proper responsibility of the bishop as the pastor responsible for individual Christians, which he usually delegated to a priest, typically the parish priest. In this sense, cura animarum is also used in today's canon law of the Roman Catholic Church.

Among the Reformers, the emphasis shifted from focus on sin to emphasis on God's forgiveness and comfort, particularly evident in the works of Martin Luther and Heinrich Bullinger. In many cases, however, church discipline soon replaced pastoral care.

In the 19th century, the Protestant theologian Friedrich Schleiermacher established practical theology. He emphasized that pastoral care should strengthen the freedom and autonomy of individual members within a congregation. As early as 1777, the field of pastoral theology was introduced into the curriculum of the University of Vienna (Austria) under Franz Stephan Rautenstrauch, and was taught in the national language rather than Latin. In Germany, it was further developed and disseminated primarily by Johann Michael Sailer and is considered a precursor to modern pastoral care.

In the United States, Anton Theophilus Boisen, one of the key figures in the American pastoral care movement, developed the concept of "clinical pastoral training" in the 1920s. This concept integrated pastoral care, psychology, and education.

In the mid-1960s, the pastoral care movement spread to Germany through the Netherlands, leading to the development of pastoral psychology. In the theology of the regional churches (Landeskirchen), pastoral care with a focus on pastoral psychology remains a standard practice today.

=== Contemporary provision ===
The field of pastoral care has become specialized and pastoral care now occurs in various contexts, including within religious congregations, hospital chaplaincy, prison chaplaincy, psychiatry, crisis intervention, telephone helplines, counseling centers, senior care facilities, disability work, hospices and the provision of palliative care, end-of-life care, grief support, and elsewhere.

The term "pastoral ministry" relates to shepherds and their role of caring for their sheep. Christians were the first to adopt the term for metaphorical use, although many religions and non-religious traditions also place an emphasis on care and social responsibility. In the West, pastoral ministry has since expanded into pastoral care, embracing many different religions and non-religious beliefs.

Modern institutional pastoral care in Europe includes multi-faith, secular, and humanist approaches. Services offered vary by institution and may include counseling, meditation, and various forms of psychological support. In some cases, clients can request their preferred type of care.

Browning (1993) divided Christian care-giving practices into three different categories: pastoral care, pastoral counseling, and pastoral psychotherapy. According to this definition, pastoral care describes the general work of the clergy of taking care of the people in their community. This comprises funerals, hospital visits, birthday visits, and dialogues.

Pastoral care approaches may vary according to their religious denomination.

==== Catholicism ====
In Catholic theology, pastoral ministry for the sick and infirm is considered a significant way that members of the Body of Christ continue the ministry and mission of Jesus. In the broad sense of "helping others", Catholics consider pastoral ministry to be the responsibility of all Christians.

Sacramental pastoral ministry is the administration of the sacraments (baptism, confirmation, eucharist, penance, extreme unction, holy orders, matrimony), which is reserved to consecrated priests except for baptism (in an emergency, anyone can baptise) and marriage, wherein the spouses are the ministers and the priest is the witness.

Pastoral ministry has been understood differently at different times in history. A significant development occurred after the Fourth Lateran Council in 1215 (see Father Boyle's lecture below).

The Second Vatican Council applied the word "pastoral" to a variety of situations involving care of souls (see the link to Monsignor Gherardini's lecture below). The Council's Decree on the Apostolate of the Laity (1965) referred to pastoral ministry and the lay apostolate as distinct but "mutually complementary" activities. The Council called on Catholic priests to see their pastoral activities as an area for continuous improvement,

always making further progress to do their pastoral work better and, where needful, prepared to enter into new pastoral ways under the direction of the Spirit of Love, which breathes where it will.

A particular skill to be learned during their priestly training was "the art of directing souls".

Many Catholic parishes employ lay ecclesial ministers as "pastoral associates" or "pastoral assistants": lay people who serve in ministerial or administrative roles, assisting the priest in his work, but who are not ordained clerics. They are responsible, among other things, for the spiritual care of the frail and homebound as well as for running a multitude of tasks associated with the sacramental life of the Church. If priests have the necessary qualifications in counseling or in psychotherapy, they may offer professional psychological services when they give pastoral counseling as part of their pastoral ministry of souls.

However, church hierarchy under popes John Paul II and Benedict XVI has emphasized that the sacrament of penance, or reconciliation, is for the forgiveness of sins and not counseling and as such should not be confused with or incorporated into the therapy given to an individual by a priest, even if the therapist priest is also that individual's confessor. The two processes, both of which are privileged and confidential under civil and canon law, are separate by nature.

Youth workers and youth ministers are also finding a place within parishes, and this involves their spirituality. It is common for youth workers and ministers to be involved in pastoral ministry, and they are required to qualify for counseling before entering into this arm of ministry.

==== Protestantism ====
The core practices of a pastor's ministry in mainline Protestant churches include pastoral care. Theological seminaries provide a curriculum that supports this facet of ministry. Pastors are often expected to also be involved in local ministries, such as hospital chaplaincy, visitation, funerals, weddings, and organization of religious activities. Pastoral ministry includes outreach, encouragement, support, counseling, and other care for members and friends of the congregation. In many churches, there are also groups, such as deacons, that provide outreach and support, often led and supported by the pastor.

The Evangelical Wesleyan Church instructs clergy with the following words: "We should endeavor to assist those under our ministry, and to aid in the salvation of souls by instructing them in their homes. ... Family religion is waning in many branches. And what avails public preaching alone, though we could preach like angels? We must, yea, every traveling preacher must instruct the people from house to house."

The Presbyterian Church (USA) is structured so that there is parity between lay leaders and pastors. Deacons and elders are ordained with specific duties.

Many Protestant approaches to pastoral care include contemporary psychological knowledge, which is reflected in the training of pastoral care practitioners. In Germany, the distinctions and the curricula of the five different pastoral care training approaches are provided by the German Society for Pastoral Psychology (Deutsche Gesellschaft für Pastoralpsychologie – DGfP). These approaches are clinical pastoral care (Klinische Seelsorge Ausbildung – KSA), the group-organisation-system approach (Gruppe-Organisation, System), the Gestalt and psychodrama approach (Gestalt und Psychodrama), the person-centric approach (Personenzentriert), and the depth psychology approach (Tiefenpsychologie).

== Humanist, secular and non-religious provision ==
Humanist groups, which act on behalf of non-religious people, have developed pastoral care offerings in response to growing demand for the provision of like-minded support from populations undergoing rapid secularisation, such as in the UK. Humanists UK, for example, manages the Non-Religious Pastoral Support Network, a network of trained and accredited volunteers and professionals who operate throughout prisons, hospitals, and universities in the UK. The terms "pastoral care" and "pastoral support" are preferred because these sound less religious than terms such as "chaplaincy." Surveys have shown that more than two thirds of patients support non-religious pastoral care being available in British institutions. Similar offerings are available from humanist groups around Europe and North America.

Pastoral care typically involves the practitioner and client sitting together, with the client sharing personal details. The practitioner listens attentively, keeps the information confidential, and, depending on their training and approach, offers guidance and counsel. This is often closely aligned with the psychological practice of holding space.

=== Pastoral care in the National Health Service in England ===
Within England, the phrase "pastoral care" was traditionally held in relation to Christian clergy. Hospital chaplaincy has seen greater religious diversity since a landmark 1997 consultation. As of 2017, 839 chaplains worked in the National Health Service (NHS) in England, representing Christian, Hindu, Muslim, Sikh, and other faith traditions.

According to 2015 NHS England's guidance on chaplaincy, the service is defined as "focused on ensuring that all people, be they religious or not, have the opportunity to access pastoral, spiritual or religious support when they need it." The guidance cited a "growing body of evidence" that appropriate spiritual care has "an immediate and enduring benefit" for people facing difficult situations such as infant deaths, terminal diagnoses, or psychosis.

The first paid non-religious pastoral carer in the NHS was appointed at University Hospitals of Leicester NHS Trust in 2016. By 2017, two paid humanist chaplains were working in the NHS and 25% of NHS trusts in England and Wales had at least one humanist volunteer. A 2017 Humanists UK poll found 69% of people believed non-religious pastoral carers should be provided alongside religious chaplains. The 2017 British Social Attitudes Survey found that 53% of Britons describe themselves as having no religion.

== Other usage ==
- In Australia, some private schools use the term "PCG" (pastoral care group) or "pastoral period" for homeroom, with teachers referred to as "PCAs" (pastoral care advisors).
- In Romania, PCAs also perform counseling roles.

== See also ==
- Chaplain
- Palliative care
- Clearness committee
- Clinical pastoral education
- Faith healing
- Holistic health

== Bibliography ==
- Arnold, Bruce Makoto, "Shepherding a Flock of a Different Fleece: A Historical and Social Analysis of the Unique Attributes of the African American Pastoral Caregiver". The Journal of Pastoral Care and Counseling, Vol. 66, No. 2. (June 2012)
- Multi-faith Centre, University of Canberra, 2013.
- Henri Nouwen, Spiritual Direction (San Francisco, California: HarperOne, 2006).
- Emmanuel Yartekwei Lartey, Pastoral Theology in an Intercultural World (Cleveland, Ohio: Pilgrim Press, 2006).
- Neil Pembroke, Renewing Pastoral Practice: Trinitarian Perspectives on Pastoral Care and Counselling (Ashgate, Aldershot, 2006) (Explorations in Practical, Pastoral and Empirical Theology).
- Beth Allison Barr, The Pastoral Care of Women in Late Medieval England (Rochester, New York: Boydell Press, 2008) (Gender in the Middle Ages, 3).
- George R. Ross, Evaluating Models of Christian Counseling (Eugene, Oregon: Wipf and Stock, 2011).
- Hamer, Dean, The God Gene: How Faith is Hardwired into Our Genes (New York: Doubleday, 2004). ISBN 0-385-50058-0.
