= Standing Advisory Council on Religious Education =

A Standing Advisory Council on Religious Education (SACRE) is an independent body in the United Kingdom that considers the provision of religious education in the area under the jurisdiction of its Local Authority. The SACRE advises and is empowered to require a review of the locally agreed syllabus for religious education (RE).

The legal constitution of SACREs is set out in paragraph, 390 subsection (4) of the Education Act 1996.

== Representative groups ==
The representative groups required by this subsection are:

- a group to represent Christian denominations and other religions and denominations that, in the opinion of the authority, appropriately reflect the principal religious traditions in the area;
- except in the case of an area in Wales, a group of persons to represent the Church of England;
- a group to represent associations representing teachers as, in the opinion of the authority, ought to be represented, having regard to the circumstances of the area; and
- a group to represent the authority.

== Statutory power ==
Each SACRE has wide-ranging statutory powers including:

- ratify syllabi written for them by the Agreed Syllabus Conference of their local authority;
- improve quality of collective worship;
- monitor quality of RE teaching and SMSCD provision and assisting where necessary or informing head teachers or governing bodies of difficulties;
- recommend speakers;
- recommend places of worship to visit;
- design supplementary teaching materials;
- contribute to teacher training and teachers’ in-service training, and;
- foster interfaith and community links especially to the end of community cohesion

== Issues ==
Several difficulties with the SACRE process have been recorded. Firstly, the ability of SACRE to represent the interests of the Buddhist community was questioned, as minority religions often fail to be properly represented at all. In practice, it would take a great deal of trouble to update Agreed Syllabi to reflect the latest trends in faith community composition or to reflect new pedagogies of RE. Even to monitor the national picture of AS content is difficult as they are often available only locally
