= Eunan O'Kane =

Footballer (born 1990)

Personal information
- Full name: Eunan Charles O'Kane
- Date of birth: 10 July 1990 (age 36)
- Place of birth: Feeny, County Londonderry, Northern Ireland
- Position: Midfielder

Youth career
- 2007–2009: Everton

Senior career*
Years	Team	Apps	(Gls)
2009–2010	Coleraine	13	(4)
2010–2012	Torquay United	106	(12)
2012–2016	Bournemouth	101	(2)
2016–2021	Leeds United	56	(0)
2018	→ Luton Town (loan)	3	(0)
2020–2021	→ Luton Town (loan)	0	(0)
Total		279	(18)

International career
2005–2006	Northern Ireland U16	2	(0)
2006–2007	Northern Ireland U17	7	(0)
2008	Northern Ireland U19	7	(1)
2011	Northern Ireland U20	1	(0)
2008–2010	Northern Ireland U21	4	(1)
2012	Republic of Ireland U21	5	(0)
2016–2017	Republic of Ireland	7	(0)
- * Club domestic league appearances and goals

Eunan Charles O'Kane (/ˈjuːnən/ YOO-nən; born 10 July 1990) is a former professional footballer who played as a midfielder.

Born in Northern Ireland, he represented the country at various youth international levels before switching to the Republic of Ireland at under-21 level. O'Kane was named as a standby for the senior Republic of Ireland squad for UEFA Euro 2016, later being left out of the final 23-man squad for the tournament.

== Early life ==
O'Kane grew up in Feeny, County Londonderry, Northern Ireland, the eldest child of Charlie O'Kane and Lorraine O'Kane. He has one younger sister, Cora. O'Kane played gaelic football in his youth for Banagher GAC while his father helped to coach the Derry GAA hurling minors to their last Ulster title success in 2001. O'Kane went to primary school in St. Canice's and received second-level education in St. Patrick's College, Maghera. He joined Maiden City Soccer Academy at the age of 10 and was being scouted by Manchester City among other clubs from the age of 12. O'Kane decided to give up Gaelic football at the age of 16 to instead focus on his association football career.

== Club career ==
O'Kane spent two years with Everton as a youth player before joining Coleraine in September 2009. At Coleraine, O'Kane scored on his professional league debut in a 3–2 loss against Glenavon and in his 10th appearance, O'Kane scored a double in a 3–0 win over Glenavon.

=== Torquay United ===
O'Kane extended his contract with the club in December before spending time on trial with Torquay United at the turn of the year. It proved to be successful, and he subsequently signed a contract with the club until June 2010. He made his debut for the club in a 1–1 draw against Chesterfield and scored his first goal in a 3–1 win over Darlington on 6 March 2010. In his second half of the season at Torquay, O'Kane made a good impression, resulting in the club awarding O'Kane and Chris Robertson a two-year deal.

The following season, O'Kane continued to make an impression for the club as he scored six time and continued to set up goal 6 times this season against Crewe (scored again later on this season), Stockport County, Rotherham United, Hereford United and Northampton Town. O'Kane scored his first FA Cup goal in third round and the only goal in a 1–0 win over Carlisle United. Also in the season, Torquay reached 7th place, resulting to participate the Play-off to get promoted to League One. In the semi-final of the play-off, O'Kane scored the second goal in the goal with a 2–0 win over Shrewsbury Town which Torquay win in the second leg to progress to the final against Stevenage, who dominated against Accrington Stanley. But lost to Stevenage following the only goal in the game from John Mousinho, preventing Torquay to get promoted to League One and in the first half of the season, O'Kane signed a new contract extension, keeping him until 2014. Through the season, O'Kane continued to make an impression for the club as he scored 5 (against Macclesfield Town, Wimbledon, twice against Plymouth Argyle and Aldershot Town) and continued to set up goal 9 times.

Towards the end of the season, he was among 3 Torquay player (Bobby Olejnik, Kevin Nicholson and Lee Mansell) named in the PFA Team of the Year of League Two and it was the first time he received an honour. Once again, Torquay United reach 5th place, resulting to participate the play-offs and played their first game against Cheltenham Town but Torquay lost in both legs.

After the end of 2011–12 season, O'Kane was linked with Newly promoted League One side Swindon Town. Crawley Town was interested signing him after the club made an offer for him about £175,000 and the offer was accepted by the club. However, O'Kane rejected the move to Crawley Town after talks with negotiations had stalled. After a move to Bournemouth, O'Kane made an explanation rejecting Crawley Town, claiming the move wasn't for him.

=== Bournemouth ===
In mid-July, the club accepted a bid from an unknown club in the League One side, which later turns out to be Bournemouth. The move was officially made on 26 July 2012. O'Kane made his debut for the club in a 1–1 draw against Portsmouth on the opening game of the season. His first goal for the Cherries came in an FA Cup game against Carlisle United in a 3–1 win. Twenty-eight days later, Kane scored his first league goal, in a 3–0 win over Crawley Town. Then just a few days after scoring his first league goal, Kane scored again in an FA Cup game against Wigan, in a 1–1 draw, which results playing again.

In a 3–1 loss against Walsall on 19 January 2013, O'Kane penalised for handball after picking the ball up because he thought a free-kick had been awarded, which led to a penalty and ended the club's 15-game unbeaten run in League One. After the match, O'Kane made apology on his Twitter account, which Manager Eddie Howe has since forgiven him and commenting the incident, believing it's should not be a penalty; instead, a free-kick. Though the incident, Walsall's assistant manager Richard O'Kelly believes that O'Kane should be short-listed for the FIFA fair play award. O'Kelly would also go on to praise O'Kane for his honesty and sportsmanship. Later in the season, O'Kane would play an important role to help the club gain promotion to the Championship following a 3–1 win over Carlisle United on 20 April 2013, but finished second place following Doncaster Rovers' 1–0 victory over promotion-chasers Brentford.

On 11 March 2014, O'Kane signed a new three-and-a-half-year deal with the Cherries. He played 17 times in all competitions, scoring one goal during the 2014–15 season as Bournemouth won the Championship and earned promotion to the Premier League. During the 2015–16 season O'Kane made 17 appearances in all competitions for Bournemouth with 13 coming in the Premier League and he helped keep Bournemouth in the Premier League.

=== Leeds United ===
On 31 August 2016, transfer deadline day, whilst away on Republic of Ireland duty for a friendly against Oman, O'Kane signed for Championship side Leeds United for an undisclosed fee on a 2-year deal. He was given squad number 14 for the 2016–17 season.

O'Kane made his debut for the club in a 2–1 win against Blackburn Rovers on 13 September 2016. His impressive form upon arrival coincided with an upturn in Leeds' form with Leeds reaching 6th place by November 2016 and into the Championship Playoff positions and also the quarter-finals of the EFL Cup.

However, on 29 November 2016, O'Kane played only 28 minutes of a 2–0 defeat against Liverpool at Anfield after suffering a recurrence of a groin injury originally picked up on international duty with Republic of Ireland and had to be substituted for Kalvin Phillips. After several weeks out injured, he made his first appearance after recovering from injury in Leeds' 3–2 defeat against Barnsley F.C. on 21 January 2017. However he struggled to regain his regular starting first team place once returning from injury under Garry Monk.

After impressing during the 2017–18 pre season under new head coach Thomas Christiansen, on 11 August 2017 O'Kane was rewarded with a new 4-year contract at the club. He started the season as a regular alongside Kalvin Phillips, however after a good start to the season, both suffered a loss of form, O'Kane found himself in and out the side with Ronaldo Vieira given more opportunities and the arrival of January signing Adam Forshaw.

On 13 January 2018, O'Kane was given a straight red card after laying a headbutt on Ipswich Town opponent Jonas Knudsen, with O'Kane coming under heavy criticism for his form after the game. He returned from a three-match suspension on 10 February, when he was named as captain in new head coach Paul Heckingbottom's first game in charge of Leeds, in a 2–1 defeat against Sheffield United. However O'Kane inadvertently assisted Sheffield United striker Billy Sharp for both Sheffield goals, heading the ball directly to Sharp in Leeds' own box for the forward to score and subsequently fouling him for a penalty which he then converted from the spot.

With speculation that he was not in Marcelo Bielsa's plans, on 26 July 2018, O'Kane was not given a shirt number for Leeds for the upcoming 2018–19 season for Leeds. In August 2018, Charlton Athletic Manager Lee Bowyer revealed Charlton had made a loan bid for O'Kane, however O'Kane wanted to stay in the EFL Championship.

In June 2021, O'Kane was released by Leeds at the end of the 2020–21 season.

==== Luton Town ====
On 31 August 2018, O'Kane joined Luton Town on loan until January 2019 but the move was cut short after he broke his leg in the victory over Bristol Rovers on 15 September. Following surgery, O'Kane was set to return to Leeds United for rehabilitation, with the club announcing he would miss the remainder of the 2018–19 season.

O'Kane returned to Luton on an 18-month loan on 30 January 2020, but more than a year later he had yet to feature again due to further injury setbacks.

== International career ==
After representing Northern Ireland at underage levels, O'Kane decided to switch allegiance to the Republic of Ireland in October 2011.

O'Kane received his first call-up to the Republic of Ireland squad in May 2012 for a European U21 Championship qualifier against Italy. He was called up to the Republic of Ireland senior national team squad in August 2015 for the first time with manager Martin O'Neill including him in a 37-man preliminary squad to face Gibraltar and Georgia in Euro 2016 qualifiers. He went on to make his first appearances for the senior team in March 2016 in a 1–0 as a substitute in the win over Switzerland, and then starting the following Tuesday in the match versus Slovakia.

After featuring four times during 2016 for Ireland and being named as a standby for Republic of Ireland for the Euro 2016, he missed out on selection for the final 23-man squad for the tournament.

On 31 August 2016, O'Kane returned to the Republic of Ireland squad in their first fixture since Euro 2016, for a friendly against Oman, where he was named as an unused substitute in a 4–0 victory in a match that turned out to be teammate Robbie Keane's final game for the national side. On 28 March 2017, he came on as a 63rd-minute substitute for Conor Hourihane in Ireland's 1–0 loss in a friendly against Iceland.

== Style of play ==
A holding midfielder, O'Kane's performances had made him a favourite with fans and managers alike, namely former English footballer Martin Ling who commented that O'Kane was 'a player like himself' who 'never shies away from wanting the ball, even after he's made a mistake.'

== Personal life ==
After wanting to marry his fiancée Laura Lacole in a humanist ceremony, O'Kane was embroiled in a high-profile court case to have a humanist Wedding Ceremony recognised as a legal marriage ceremony.

On 20 June 2017, O'Kane and his fiancée Lacole made history when they won their battle via the Court of Appeal in the Belfast High Court, Northern Ireland, the couple's ceremony on 22 June 2017 was the first legal humanist ceremony in Northern Ireland and the first in the United Kingdom outside Scotland.

== Career statistics ==
=== Club ===
Appearances and goals by club, season and competition
Club	Season	League			FA Cup		League Cup		Other		Total	
Club	Season	Division	Apps	Goals	Apps	Goals	Apps	Goals	Apps	Goals	Apps	Goals
Torquay United	2009–10	League Two	16	1	0	0	0	0	0	0	16	1
Torquay United	2010–11	League Two	45	6	4	1	1	0	5 (Note: 2 appearances in Football League Trophy, 3 appearances and one goal in League Two play-offs)	1	55	8
Torquay United	2011–12	League Two	45	5	2	0	1	0	3 (Note: 1 appearance in Football League Trophy, 2 appearances in League Two play-offs)	0	51	5
Torquay United	Total		106	12	6	1	2	0	8	1	122	14
Bournemouth	2012–13	League One	37	1	4	2	0	0	0	0	41	3
Bournemouth	2013–14	Championship	37	1	2	0	1	1	0	0	40	2
Bournemouth	2014–15	Championship	11	0	2	0	4	1	0	0	17	1
Bournemouth	2015–16	Premier League	16	0	3	0	1	0	0	0	20	0
Bournemouth	Total		101	2	11	2	6	2	0	0	118	6
Leeds United	2016–17	Championship	24	0	0	0	2	0	0	0	26	0
Leeds United	2017–18	Championship	32	0	0	0	0	0	0	0	32	0
Leeds United	Total		56	0	0	0	2	0	0	0	58	0
Luton Town (loan)	2018–19	League One	3	0	0	0	0	0	1 (Note: Appearance(s) in EFL Trophy)	0	4	0
Luton Town (loan)	2019–20	Championship	0	0	0	0	0	0	0	0	0	0
Luton Town (loan)	2020–21	Championship	0	0	0	0	0	0	0	0	0	0
Luton Town (loan)	Total		3	0	0	0	0	0	1	0	4	0
Career total			266	14	17	3	10	2	9	1	302	20

=== International ===
Appearances and goals by national team and year
National team	Year	Apps	Goals
Republic of Ireland	2016	5	0
Republic of Ireland	2017	2	0
Total		7	0

== Honours ==
AFC Bournemouth

- Football League Championship: 2014–15
- Football League One runner-up: 2012–13

Individual

- PFA Team of the Year: 2011–12 League Two

== See also ==
- List of Republic of Ireland international footballers born outside the Republic of Ireland
