= Laura Lacole =

Northern Irish model

- Born: 12 September 1989 (age 36); Belfast, Northern Ireland
- Occupation: Model

Laura Lacole (born 12 September 1989) is a Northern Irish model.

In 2017, Lacole, an atheist, became the first woman in Northern Ireland to be married in a legal humanist ceremony, marrying Irish footballer Eunan O'Kane. The couple brought a judicial review regarding Northern Ireland's treatment of humanists, which they viewed as discriminatory.

== Early career ==
Lacole was born in Belfast, Northern Ireland. Her first modelling job was for a racing championship, during which she was published in motorsport magazines, including Modified Motors and Fast Car. She then modelled in Europe for racing events. At the age of 18, she worked at Paris Tuning Show and Circuit de Nevers Magny-Cours in France as a performer.

== Glamour modelling ==
Her modelling progressed to glamour in 2008 at the age of 19. Lacole has been published in magazines and newspapers across the world. She has featured in the Irish and UK press.

She won the title of Beach Babe 2011 in September of that year.

== Media appearances ==
Since early 2012, Lacole has been broadcast on the BBC, SKY NEWS and UTV. Throughout 2012 and 2013, she was a regular contributor for broadcaster Stephen Nolan's TV and radio shows.

In September 2012, she spoke to BBC Newsnight about the 'No More Page 3' campaign, supporting the Page 3 girls. In January 2015, Lacole was a guest alongside former Home Secretary; Alan Johnson, Green Party MP Caroline Lucas and former Conservative Party MP Michael Portillo on BBC One's 'This Week' programme presented by Andrew Neil where she also spoke about the topic.

== Space ==
In 2013, Lacole campaigned to go to space by competing in the Lynx Space Academy competition.

== Charity ==
In 2010 and 2011, Lacole led the Ancestors Charity Bike Rally which delivers donated toys to children in the Ulster Hospital every Christmas. In 2012, she became the Northern Ireland Ambassador for the 'Male Cancer Awareness Campaign' charity and in early 2013, did her own fundraising event the 'Belfast Strut'; a 16-mile walk with 200 participants. In the lead up to this event, Lacole gained the support of William and Michael Dunlop who posed with her wearing only their helmets and boots to raise awareness of the event and its cause.

== Personal life ==
Lacole is married to footballer Eunan O'Kane. They have one son.
