= Jordon =

Jordon is both a surname and a given name. Notable people with the name include:

== Surname ==
- Darren Jordon (born 1960), British journalist
- Mark Jordon (born 1965), English actor
- Phil Jordon (1933–1965), American basketball player
- Ray Jordon (1937–2012), Australian cricketer
- Robert E. Jordon, American academic

== Given name ==
- Jordon Brown (born 1992), Scottish footballer
- Jordon Dizon (born 1986), American football player
- Jordon Forster (born 1993), Scottish footballer
- Jordon Hudson (born 2001), American pageant contestant
- Jordon Ibe (born 1995), English footballer
- Jordon Mutch (born 1991), English footballer
- Jordon Nardino, American television writer
- Jordon Riley (born 1998), American football player
- Jordon Southorn (born 1990), Canadian ice hockey player
- Jordon Zadorozny (born 1974), Canadian musician

== See also ==
- Jordon, Illinois, a former town in Illinois, United States
- Jordan (disambiguation)
