= John Thomason (disambiguation) =

John Thomason (1893–1944) was a U.S. Marine Corps officer and author.

John Thomason may also refer to:

- Stumpy Thomason (John Griffin Thomason , 1893–1944), American football player
- John W. Thomason (politician) (1874–1953), American politician
- USS John W. Thomason, named for the U.S. Marine Corps officer
