= Jordon, Illinois =

Ghost town in Clay County, Illinois

Jordon, Illinois, was a small town in mid-southern Illinois, located in Clay County, established approximately in 1860. It offered two blacksmiths, one general store, one church, and various small "shops". Land was donated by William Jordon, and several businesses were established thereon.

In 1920 the first concrete road (called "Route 45") was started from the south tip of Illinois continuing north to the Wisconsin border. This new road would be .49 miles west of where Jordon sat, so the business people in Jordon voted to dissolve their town and offer to help businesses relocate to the new highway area. Over a span of six months beginning in 1921, several business physically had their businesses jacked up and moved on wagons and moved adjacent to the new highway area. (There are interviews with local inhabitants which indicate that two merchants did not relocate, but chose to stay in Jordon). Each business that chose to relocate was given a plot of land on which to place their establishment, and when this community of houses and businesses was finished it was (and is today) called Hord (after Jim Hord, who donated six acres for the new town).

The original church, built in approximately 1880, was relocated from Jordon to Hord in 1924, and is still in use today.

Jordon was located 38.55.03.12 degrees NORTH, and 88.30.56.89 degrees WEST.
