= Blair Township =

Blair Township may refer to:

- Blair Township, Clay County, Illinois
- Blair Township, Michigan
- Blair Township, Pennsylvania
