= 2015–16 Liverpool F.C. season =

English football club season

Liverpool
2015–16 season
- Owner: Fenway Sports Group
- Chairman: Tom Werner
- Manager: Brendan Rodgers (until 4 October 2015); Jürgen Klopp (from 8 October 2015)
- Stadium: Anfield
- Premier League: 8th
- FA Cup: Fourth round
- League Cup: Runners-up
- UEFA Europa League: Runners-up
- Top goalscorer: League: Roberto Firmino (10); All: Daniel Sturridge (13)
Home colours	Away colours	Third colours

The 2015–16 season was Liverpool Football Club's 124th season in existence and their 54th consecutive season in the top flight of English football. It was also the club's 24th consecutive season in the Premier League. Along with the Premier League, Liverpool competed in the FA Cup, Football League Cup and UEFA Europa League. The season covered the period from 1 July 2015 to 30 June 2016. It started with a 1–0 away win against Stoke City in the league and ended with a 1–3 defeat to Sevilla in the UEFA Europa League Final.

The season was the first since 1997–98 without former captain Steven Gerrard, who departed to LA Galaxy.

== Season review ==
=== Pre-season ===
On 10 July 2015, Jordan Henderson was announced as the new captain of Liverpool following the departure of Steven Gerrard. The next day, Liverpool travelled to Asia for four pre-season matches with a 30-man squad. They played their first match of the pre-season on 14 July against Thai Premier League XI and won the match comfortably with the score of 4–0 in which Lazar Marković, Mamadou Sakho, Adam Lallana and Divock Origi scored a goal each. On 17 July, Adam Lallana and James Milner scored a goal apiece in a 2–1 win over Brisbane Roar. On 20 July, Liverpool won 2–0 against Adelaide United with goals from James Milner and Danny Ings.

For the fourth game, Liverpool travelled to Malaysia to face Malaysia XI and the match finished a goal apiece with goals from Patrick Wleh and Jordon Ibe. On 1 August, Liverpool played against the Finnish side HJK Helsinki and won the match 2–0 with goals from Divock Origi and Philippe Coutinho. Liverpool played their last match of the pre-season against Swindon Town and won the game 2–1 with goals from debutant Christian Benteke and youngster Sheyi Ojo, who scored the winning goal.

=== August ===
On 7 August, James Milner was appointed the vice captain of Liverpool FC. On 9 August 2015, Liverpool won their opening match against Stoke City in the Premier League. Philippe Coutinho scored the winning goal in the 86th minute with a long-range effort which ultimately gave Liverpool a 1–0 win. This victory came at the site of their biggest defeat, when Stoke won 6–1 that May. On 17 August, Liverpool played the second match of the league season at Anfield against AFC Bournemouth in a 1–0 win for Liverpool, in which Christian Benteke scored his first competitive goal for the club. On 24 August, Liverpool played a 0–0 draw with Arsenal at the Emirates Stadium. On 29 August 2015, Liverpool lost the first match of the season against West Ham United in a 3–0 win for the away side. This was West Ham's first victory at Anfield since 1963.

=== September ===
On 13 September, Liverpool travelled to Manchester to play against Manchester United and suffered a 3–1 defeat in the latest instalment of their rivalry. On 17 September, Liverpool began their UEFA Europa League campaign with a 1–1 draw away against Bordeaux. On 21 September, Liverpool played a 1–1 draw with Norwich City at home, with Danny Ings scoring the goal for Liverpool. On 24 September, Liverpool won the third-round match of the League Cup via penalties after 1–1 draw in 120 minutes against Carlisle United. Liverpool registered a 3–2 victory over Aston Villa on 27 September with James Milner scoring in the second minute of play and Daniel Sturridge scoring a brace.

=== October ===
Liverpool began the first match of the month on 1 October, with yet another 1–1 draw in the Europa league group stage game against Sion, where Adam Lallana scored his second goal in a row in the competition. On 4 October, Liverpool played their 225th Merseyside Derby against Everton with the game ending again in a 1–1 draw, Liverpool's goal coming from Danny Ings. This was the fifth time in Liverpool's previous six games that they had taken a 1–0 lead only to have the game end in a 1–1 draw; they had just one win in their previous nine games.

Just one hour after the game, manager Brendan Rodgers was sacked following the result which left Liverpool in tenth place after eight games. Later, it was known that the decision to sack him had already been made prior to the match against Everton. The following day, Rodgers released a statement through the League Managers Association, stating, "I am, of course incredibly disappointed to be leaving... [but] it has been both an honour and a privilege to manage one of the game's great clubs." On 8 October 2015, former Borussia Dortmund manager Jürgen Klopp agreed a three-year deal to become Liverpool manager, replacing Rodgers. Klopp's debut game was a 0–0 away draw with Tottenham Hotspur on 17 October 2015.

On 22 October, Liverpool settled for a 1–1 score resulting yet another draw, but this time in the Europa League against Rubin Kazan. Liverpool played second consecutive 1–1 draw and third consecutive draw in all competitions on 25 October against Southampton. On 28 October, Liverpool finally ended three consecutive draw spree to win 1–0 against AFC Bournemouth in the fourth round and entered the quarter-finals of the League Cup. Klopp won his first league game against Chelsea on 31 October in a 3–1 win, with a brace from Philippe Coutinho and a goal from Christian Benteke.

=== November ===
November began with the Reds' first Europa League win of the season, coming on 5 November in a 1–0 victory over Rubin Kazan, where Jordon Ibe scored his first ever competitive goal for Liverpool. On 8 November, Klopp lost his first game against Crystal Palace in a 2–1 defeat at Anfield. However, the side bounced back after the international break with a 4–1 away win over Manchester City on 22 November, the club's first league win at the Etihad Stadium since 2008. Following this, his side advanced to the knockout stage of the Europa League following a 2–1 win over Bordeaux on 26 November. Liverpool then climbed to sixth in the Premier League table with a 1–0 win over Swansea City thanks to a penalty from James Milner.

=== December ===
On 2 December, Liverpool played Southampton away in the quarter-finals of the League Cup. After going 1–0 down in the first minute of play, they produced a remarkable comeback and won 1–6, with a goal from Jordon Ibe, a brace from Daniel Sturridge and a hat-trick from Divock Origi. Liverpool again lost, this time they suffered a 2–0 away defeat at the hands of Newcastle United on 6 December. Liverpool played a goalless draw in the last match of the Europa League group stage against Sion on 10 December, eventually finishing top of the group. On 13 December, Liverpool played a 2–2 draw against West Bromwich Albion at Anfield, with Origi scoring in the sixth minute of injury time total of eight minutes. On 20 December, Liverpool played against Watford at Vicarage Road and lost 0–3, making it Jürgen Klopp's third loss as Liverpool manager. On Boxing Day, Liverpool played Leicester City and went on to win 1–0 to a Christian Benteke goal in the 63rd minutes of play. On 30 December, Liverpool played their last game of 2015 against Sunderland at the Stadium of Light, where the team won by 1–0.

=== January ===
On 2 January, Liverpool lost their first game of 2016 at the Boleyn Ground against West Ham, 2–0, West Ham's first league double against Liverpool in 52 years. On 5 January, Liverpool played Stoke away in the first leg of the semi-finals of the League Cup and won 1–0, with Jordon Ibe scoring. On 8 January, Liverpool played Exeter City in the FA Cup away at St. James Park and drew 2–2, with Jerome Sinclair and Brad Smith scoring. On 13 January, Liverpool played Arsenal at Anfield, the match ending in a 3–3 draw in which Roberto Firmino scored a brace and Joe Allen equalised for Liverpool in the 90th minute. On 17 January, Liverpool lost 1–0 at Anfield to rivals Manchester United, with Wayne Rooney scoring the only goal. On 20 January, Liverpool played Exeter City in the FA Cup third round replay at Anfield, winning 3–0 with goals from Joe Allen, Sheyi Ojo and João Carlos Teixeira. On 23 January, Liverpool played Norwich at Carrow Road and won 5–4, with Adam Lallana scoring a winning goal in stoppage time. On 26 January, Liverpool played the second leg of their League Cup semi-final against Stoke, losing 1–0 on the night but winning the penalty shootout 6–5 and advancing to the final at Wembley Stadium. The win was Liverpool's 11th success in 13 penalty shoot-outs in all competitions. On 30 January, Liverpool played West Ham at home and drew 0–0 in the FA Cup; the two clubs will replay the match on 9 February.

=== February ===
On 2 February, Liverpool travelled to the King Power Stadium to play Leicester City, losing 2–0 through goals by Jamie Vardy. On 6 February, Liverpool played Sunderland at Anfield and were leading 2–0 with goals from Roberto Firmino and Adam Lallana, however in the 77th minute, more than 10,000 supporters, led by fan group Spirit of Shankly, staged the first walkout in the club's history in reaction to a proposed increase in ticket prices. Sunderland went on to score two late goals and the match ended in a 2–2 draw. The club and executive Ian Ayre reversed their proposal and issued a formal apology in what was seen as a win for the supporters.

On 9 February, Liverpool travelled to the Boleyn Ground to play West Ham in the FA Cup fourth round replay, losing 2–1; Philippe Coutinho scored a free kick on his comeback from his injury. On 14 February, Liverpool beat Aston Villa 6–0 at Villa Park, with goals scored by Daniel Sturridge, James Milner, Emre Can, Divock Origi, Nathaniel Clyne and Kolo Touré. It was the first time in the Premier League era that Liverpool scored with six different goalscorers in a single match. Midfielder Kevin Stewart made his Premier League debut as a 66th-minute substitute, replacing Coutinho. On 18 February, Liverpool travelled to the WWK Arena in Augsburg to play FC Augsburg, drawing 0–0 in their first leg Europa League tie. On 25 February, Liverpool played the second leg and won 1–0 with a penalty scored by James Milner in the fifth minute, advancing to the round of 16. On 28 February, Liverpool played the Capital One Cup Final at Wembley against Manchester City, losing 3–1 on penalties after the game finished 1–1 after regular and extra time. Philippe Coutinho had scored the game's equaliser in the 83rd minute to send the match to extra time and ultimately penalties. A win would have been Liverpool's ninth League Cup, having last won it in 2012.

=== March ===
On 2 March, Liverpool hosted Manchester City just three days after they lost the League Cup final. The match was played at Anfield and was won 3–0 with goals from Adam Lallana, James Milner and Roberto Firmino. On 6 March, Liverpool played Crystal Palace away at Selhurst Park, winning 2–1 with a goal from Roberto Firmino after a mistake by the Palace goalkeeper Alex McCarthy and an injury time penalty from substitute Christian Benteke. On 10 March, Liverpool played Manchester United at Anfield in the Europa League round of 16, winning 2–0 in the first leg with goals from Daniel Sturridge and Firmino. On 17 March, Liverpool travelled to Old Trafford to play United in the tie's second leg and drew 1–1, progressing to next round by prevailing 3–1 on aggregate.

=== April ===
On 10 April, Liverpool beat Stoke City 4–1 at Anfield, making it the biggest win of the Jürgen Klopp era at home for Liverpool, with Alberto Moreno and Daniel Sturridge netting once each in the first half, and Divock Origi scoring a brace in the second. On 14 April, Liverpool played Borussia Dortmund in the Europa League quarter-finals second leg at Anfield after a 1–1 away draw in the first leg on 7 April. The match started horribly for Liverpool with the club trailing 2–0 after nine minutes. Early in the second half, Divock Origi scored to cut down the deficit, but Marco Reus put Borussia Dortmund 3–1 up on 57 minutes. With Liverpool requiring three more goals, Philippe Coutinho curled home from the edge of the area, Mamadou Sakho scored his first goal since December 2013 for the club from a corner on 78 minutes and finally, in the first minute of injury time, Dejan Lovren headed in his first goal of the season off James Milner's cross to send Liverpool through 5–4 on aggregate, with Liverpool winning 4–3 on the night. On 17 April, Liverpool beat AFC Bournemouth 1–2 away at Dean Court. Klopp made ten changes to the team which had defeated Borussia Dortmund 4–3, including giving goalkeeper Danny Ward his debut. Roberto Firmino and Daniel Sturridge netted one goal each before Joshua King scored an exceptional consolation goal in the third minute of second-half stoppage time.

On 20 April, Liverpool defeated Everton 4–0 in the second Merseyside Derby of the season. Divock Origi and Mamadou Sakho scored a goal each late in the first half to give Liverpool a half-time lead. In the 50th minute, Ramiro Funes Mori was given a red card following his tackle on Origi which caused Origi's substitution due to an injury sustained as a result of the tackle. Origi's substitute, Daniel Sturridge, and Philippe Coutinho added goals. Liverpool was exceptionally dominant in the game, with 37 shots as opposed to Everton's 3, as well as having 67% of the possession. This win moved Liverpool to seventh. On 23 April, Liverpool welcomed former manager Rafael Benítez to Anfield with his new team, Newcastle, and drew 2–2. Despite leading 2–0 at half-time through goals by Daniel Sturridge and Adam Lallana, the lead was cancelled out by a Papiss Cissé header when goalkeeper Simon Mignolet failed to clear a cross and a Jack Colback's low strike which took a huge deflection. Mamadou Sakho was not available for selection as UEFA was conducting an investigation into a possible doping violation; he was replaced by Kolo Touré. On 28 April, UEFA had announced the suspension of Sakho for a provisional period of 30 days following a positive drug test. On the same day, Liverpool travelled to El Madrigal to play Villarreal, but were downed by a late goal from substitute Adrián in the 92nd minute to lose 1–0.

=== May ===
On May Day, Liverpool travelled to Swansea at the Liberty Stadium with a much-changed squad, enduring a horrid start after conceding two goals in the first half, the first from an André Ayew header and the second from a Jack Cork strike. Christian Benteke nodded in to peg one for the visitors but Ayew's second goal ended all hopes for a comeback; the game ended in a 3–1 loss. On 5 May, Liverpool played Villarreal at Anfield in the Europa League and won 3–0 through an own goal by Bruno Soriano and two goals by Daniel Sturridge and Adam Lallana. This ensured qualification to the competition's final after an aggregate scoreline of 3–1. On 8 May, Liverpool played Watford and won 2–0 at home, goals coming from Joe Allen after a knock-down by Benteke, as well as a solo effort by substitute Roberto Firmino. On 11 May, Liverpool played Chelsea and drew 1–1, marking Klopp's 50th game in charge and also the last home game of the season. Chelsea opened the scoring through Eden Hazard's marvelous shot on target, but the match was equalised in the dying moments after a Benteke header, capitalising on an error by goalkeeper Asmir Begović. On 15 May, Liverpool played West Brom away and drew 1–1, marking Liverpool's last game of the Premier League season. Jordan Ibe's strike in the 23rd minute secured a point from the game.

Liverpool ended the season in eighth position and did not qualify for any European competition based on league standings. On 18 May, Liverpool played Sevilla in the Europa League final and lost 1–3 with the lone goal coming from Sturridge in the first half of the game. After the game, Klopp took full responsibility for the loss, saying, "Tonight we couldn't reach the level and it is my job to help the boys use these opportunities. I am responsible for this performance too, so no criticism for my players tonight." Liverpool fans and pundits took to social media to slam Alberto Moreno's performance, and even a request for Klopp to buy a new left back from Liverpool legend Jamie Carragher. Former Liverpool greats Michael Owen and Steve McManaman also hit out at left-back Moreno following his calamitous display.

== First team ==
Squad No.	Name	Nationality	Position(s)	Date of birth	Signed from	Apps	Goals	Assists
Goalkeepers
22	Simon Mignolet	(Belgium)	GK	6 March 1988 (aged 28)	(England) Sunderland	149	0	0
34	Ádám Bogdán	(Hungary)	GK	27 September 1987 (aged 28)	(England) Bolton	6	0	0
52	Danny Ward	(Wales)	GK	22 June 1993 (aged 23)	(Wales) Wrexham	2	0	0
Defenders
2	Nathaniel Clyne	(England)	RB	5 April 1991 (aged 25)	(England) Southampton	52	2	1
3	José Enrique	(Spain)	LB	23 January 1986 (aged 30)	(England) Newcastle United	99	2	8
4	Kolo Touré (4th captain)	(Ivory Coast)	CB	19 March 1981 (aged 35)	(England) Manchester City	71	1	2
6	Dejan Lovren	(Croatia)	CB	5 July 1989 (aged 26)	(England) Southampton	77	2	0
12	Joe Gomez	(England)	RB/LB/CB	23 May 1997 (aged 19)	(England) Charlton Athletic	7	0	1
17	Mamadou Sakho	(France)	CB	13 February 1990 (aged 26)	(France) Paris St Germain	80	3	0
18	Alberto Moreno	(Spain)	LB	5 July 1992 (aged 23)	(Spain) Sevilla	91	3	7
19	Steven Caulker	(England)	CB	29 December 1991 (aged 24)	(England) Queens Park Rangers	4	0	0
26	Tiago Ilori	(Portugal)	CB	26 February 1993 (aged 23)	(Portugal) Sporting	3	0	0
37	Martin Škrtel	(Slovakia)	CB	15 December 1984 (aged 31)	(Russia) Zenit	320	18	5
38	Jon Flanagan	(England)	RB	1 January 1993 (aged 23)	(England) LFC Academy	50	1	2
43	Ryan McLaughlin	(Northern Ireland)	RB	30 September 1994 (aged 21)	(England) LFC Academy	0	0	0
44	Brad Smith	(Australia)	LB	9 April 1994 (aged 22)	(England) LFC Academy	11	1	2
56	Connor Randall	(England)	RB	21 October 1995 (aged 20)	(England) LFC Academy	7	0	0
Midfielders
7	James Milner (vice-captain)	(England)	CM/LW/RW	4 January 1986 (aged 30)	(England) Manchester City	45	7	14
10	Philippe Coutinho	(Brazil)	LW/AM	12 June 1992 (aged 24)	(Italy) Inter Milan	145	28	26
14	Jordan Henderson (captain)	(England)	CM/DM	17 June 1990 (aged 26)	(England) Sunderland	212	22	32
20	Adam Lallana	(England)	AM/LW/RW	10 May 1988 (aged 28)	(England) Southampton	90	13	12
21	Lucas (3rd captain)	(Brazil)	DM/CM/CB	9 January 1987 (aged 29)	(Brazil) Grêmio	315	6	16
23	Emre Can	(Germany)	CM/DM	12 January 1994 (aged 22)	(Germany) Bayer Leverkusen	89	3	4
24	Joe Allen	(Wales)	AM/CM/LW	14 March 1990 (aged 26)	(Wales) Swansea City	132	7	3
32	Cameron Brannagan	(England)	CM	9 May 1996 (aged 20)	(England) LFC Academy	9	0	0
33	Jordon Ibe	(England)	RW/LW	8 December 1995 (aged 20)	(England) Wycombe Wanderers	58	4	6
35	Kevin Stewart	(England)	DM/CM	7 September 1993 (aged 22)	(England) Tottenham Hotspur	11	0	0
40	Ryan Kent	(England)	RW/LW	11 November 1996 (aged 19)	(England) LFC Academy	1	0	0
41	Jack Dunn	(England)	AM/RW/LW	19 November 1994 (aged 21)	(England) LFC Academy	0	0	0
46	Jordan Rossiter	(England)	DM/CM	24 March 1997 (aged 19)	(England) LFC Academy	5	1	0
53	João Carlos Teixeira	(Portugal)	AM/LW	18 January 1993 (aged 23)	(Portugal) Sporting	8	1	0
54	Sheyi Ojo	(England)	RW/LW	19 June 1997 (aged 19)	(England) LFC Academy	11	1	4
68	Pedro Chirivella	(Spain)	DM/CM	27 May 1997 (aged 19)	(Spain) Valencia	5	0	0
Forwards
9	Christian Benteke	(Belgium)	FW	3 December 1990 (aged 25)	(England) Aston Villa	42	10	5
11	Roberto Firmino	(Brazil)	FW/AM	2 October 1991 (aged 24)	(Germany) Hoffenheim	49	11	9
15	Daniel Sturridge	(England)	FW	1 September 1989 (aged 26)	(England) Chelsea	92	53	13
27	Divock Origi	(Belgium)	FW/LW	18 April 1995 (aged 21)	(France) Lille	33	10	3
28	Danny Ings	(England)	FW/LW/RW	23 July 1992 (aged 23)	(England) Burnley	9	3	0
48	Jerome Sinclair	(England)	FW	20 September 1996 (aged 19)	(England) West Bromwich	5	1	0

=== New contracts ===
No.	Pos	Player	Date	Source
4	CB	(Ivory Coast) Kolo Touré	26 May 2015	
47	RB	(England) Andre Wisdom	26 May 2015	
52	GK	(Wales) Danny Ward	23 June 2015	
37	CB	(Slovakia) Martin Škrtel	10 July 2015	
54	LW	(England) Sheyi Ojo	4 August 2015	
17	CB	(France) Mamadou Sakho	18 September 2015	
32	AM/CM	(England) Cameron Brannagan	26 October 2015	
44	LB/LW	(Australia) Brad Smith	18 November 2015	
22	GK	(Belgium) Simon Mignolet	18 January 2016	
35	DM/CM	(England) Kevin Stewart	23 February 2016	
68	DM/CM	(Spain) Pedro Chirivella	9 March 2016	
38	RB/LB	(England) Jon Flanagan	18 March 2016	

== Transfers and loans ==
=== Transfers in ===
Entry date	Position	No.	Player	From club	Fee	Ref.
1 July 2015	CB	12	(England) Joe Gomez	(England) Charlton Athletic	£3,500,000	
1 July 2015	RM	7	(England) James Milner	(England) Manchester City	Free	
1 July 2015	FW	28	(England) Danny Ings	(England) Burnley	£6,500,000 (Note: The fee may eventually rise to £8 million subject to player's performances and a 20 per cent sell-on clause.)	
1 July 2015	GK	34	(Hungary) Ádám Bogdán	(England) Bolton Wanderers	Free	
1 July 2015	AM	11	(Brazil) Roberto Firmino	(Germany) 1899 Hoffenheim	£21,300,000 (Note: The fee may eventually rise to £28.4 million subject to player's performances.)	
1 July 2015	RB	2	(England) Nathaniel Clyne	(England) Southampton	£10,000,000 (Note: The fee may eventually rise to £12.5 million subject to player's performances.)	
22 July 2015	FW	9	(Belgium) Christian Benteke	(England) Aston Villa	£32,500,000	
6 January 2016	MF	–	(Serbia) Marko Grujić	(Serbia) Red Star Belgrade	£5,100,000	
Total					£78,900,000	

=== Transfers out ===
Exit date	Position	No.	Player	To club	Fee	Ref.
1 July 2015	GK	1	(Australia) Brad Jones	(England) Bradford City	Released	
1 July 2015	RB	2	(England) Glen Johnson	(England) Stoke City	Released	
1 July 2015	CM	8	(England) Steven Gerrard	(United States) LA Galaxy	Released	
1 July 2015	CB	16	(Uruguay) Sebastián Coates	(England) Sunderland	£4,000,000	
1 July 2015	FW	–	(Spain) Iago Aspas	(Spain) Celta Vigo	£5,000,000	
8 July 2015	RB	19	(Spain) Javier Manquillo	(Spain) Atlético Madrid	Loan Cancelled	
14 July 2015	RW	31	(England) Raheem Sterling	(England) Manchester City	£44,000,000 (Note: Fee may eventually rise to £49,000,000.)	
31 July 2015	ST	9	(England) Rickie Lambert	(England) West Bromwich Albion	£3,000,000	
31 August 2015	ST	29	(Italy) Fabio Borini	(England) Sunderland	£8,000,000 (Note: Fee may eventually rise to £10,000,000.)	
Total					£59,200,000	

=== Loans in ===
Start date	End date	Position	No.	Player	From club	Fee	Ref.
12 January 2016	End of season	CB	19	(England) Steven Caulker	(England) Queens Park Rangers	None	
Total						£0	

=== Loans out ===
Start date	End date	Position	No.	Player	To club	Fee	Ref.
26 June 2015	11 January 2016	GK	52	(Wales) Danny Ward	(Scotland) Aberdeen	None	
6 July 2015	End of Season	AM	—	(Spain) Luis Alberto	(Spain) Deportivo La Coruña	None	
10 July 2015	End of Season (Note: Jones' Blackpool loan was extended on 4 August 2015.)	CB	51	(England) Lloyd Jones	(England) Blackpool	None	
10 July 2015	End of Season	CM	49	(Wales) Jordan Williams	(England) Swindon Town	None	
11 July 2015	8 January 2016	RB	35	(England) Kevin Stewart	(England) Swindon Town	None	
29 July 2015	End of Season	CB	47	(England) Andre Wisdom	(England) Norwich City	£1,250,000	
4 August 2015	7 January 2016	LW	54	(England) Sheyi Ojo	(England) Wolverhampton Wanderers	None	
27 August 2015	End of Season	CF	45	(Italy) Mario Balotelli	(Italy) Milan	None	
29 August 2015	January 2016	RB	43	(Northern Ireland) Ryan McLaughlin	(Scotland) Aberdeen	None	
30 August 2015	End of Season	RW	50	(Serbia) Lazar Marković	(Turkey) Fenerbahçe	Undisclosed	
31 August 2015	End of Season	CF	36	(Germany) Samed Yeşil	(Switzerland) Luzern	None	
1 September 2015	7 January 2016	CB	26	(Portugal) Tiago Ilori	(England) Aston Villa	£1,000,000	
6 January 2016	End of Season	MF	-	(Serbia) Marko Grujić	(Serbia) Red Star Belgrade	None	
23 January 2016	22 February 2016	GK	39	(Scotland) Ryan Fulton	(England) Portsmouth	None	
Total						£2,250,000	

=== Transfer summary ===
Spending

Summer: ▼£73,800,000

Winter: ▼£5,100,000

Total: ▼£78,900,000

Income

Summer: ▲£57,450,000

Winter: £0

Total: ▲£57,450,000

Expenditure

Summer: ▼£16,350,000

Winter: ▼£5,100,000

Total: ▼£21,450,000

== Friendlies ==
=== Pre-season ===
14 July 2015 True Super Trophy	Thai Premier League XI	0–4	Liverpool	Bangkok, Thailand
14:00 BST		Report	Marković 3'; Sakho 42'; Lallana 52'; Allen (yellow card) 78'; Origi 88'	Stadium: Rajamangala Stadium; Attendance: 49,772

17 July 2015 Friendly	Brisbane Roar	1–2	Liverpool	Brisbane, Australia
09:45 BST	Petratos 17'	Report	Lallana 28'; Milner 75'	Stadium: Suncorp Stadium; Attendance: 50,000

20 July 2015 Friendly	Adelaide United	0–2	Liverpool	Adelaide, Australia
10:30 BST		Report	Milner 67'; Ings 88'	Stadium: Adelaide Oval; Attendance: 53,008

24 July 2015 ProEvents Plate	Malaysia XI	1–1	Liverpool	Kuala Lumpur, Malaysia
13:45 BST	Wleh 13'	Report	Ibe 28'	Stadium: Bukit Jalil National Stadium; Attendance: 45,000

1 August 2015 Friendly	HJK Helsinki	0–2	Liverpool	Helsinki, Finland
17:30 BST		Report	Origi 73'; Coutinho 78'	Stadium: Olympic Stadium; Attendance: 20,808

2 August 2015 Friendly	Swindon Town	1–2	Liverpool	Swindon, England
16:00 BST	Obika 63'	Report	Benteke 48'; Ojo 87'	Stadium: County Ground; Attendance: 14,591

== Competitions ==
=== Overall record ===
Competition	First match	Last match	Starting round	Final position	Record							
Competition	First match	Last match	Starting round	Final position	Pld	W	D	L	GF	GA	GD	Win %
Premier League	9 August 2015	15 May 2016	Matchday 1	8th	38	16	12	10	63	50	+13	42.11
FA Cup	8 January 2016	9 February 2016	Third round	Fourth round	4	1	2	1	6	4	+2	25.00
League Cup	23 September 2015	28 February 2016	Third round	Runners-up	6	3	2	1	10	4	+6	50.00
UEFA Europa League	17 September 2015	18 May 2016	Group stage	Runners-up	15	6	7	2	19	13	+6	40.00
Total					63	26	23	14	98	71	+27	41.27

Source: Soccerway

=== Premier League ===
==== League table ====
Pos	Team	Pld	W	D	L	GF	GA	GD	Pts	Qualification or relegation
6	Southampton	38	18	9	11	59	41	+18	63	Qualification for the Europa League group stage (Note: Manchester United qualified for the Europa League group stage by winning the 2015–16 FA Cup. As they had also qualified by their virtue of their league position (5th), this spot was passed to the next-highest ranked team (6th), Southampton.)
7	West Ham United	38	16	14	8	65	51	+14	62	Qualification for the Europa League third qualifying round (Note: Manchester City qualified for the Europa League third qualifying round by winning the 2015–16 Football League Cup. However, since they already qualified for European competition based on their league position, the spot awarded to the League Cup winners was passed to the next best-placed team (seventh-placed West Ham United).)
8	Liverpool	38	16	12	10	63	50	+13	60	
9	Stoke City	38	14	9	15	41	55	−14	51	
10	Chelsea	38	12	14	12	59	53	+6	50	

Source: Barclays Premier League
Rules for classification: 1) Points; 2) Goal difference; 3) Goals scored; 4) Play-offs (only if needed to decide champion, teams for relegation or teams for UEFA competitions).

==== Results summary ====
Overall								Home						Away					
Pld	W	D	L	GF	GA	GD	Pts	W	D	L	GF	GA	GD	W	D	L	GF	GA	GD
38	16	12	10	63	50	+13	60	8	8	3	33	22	+11	8	4	7	30	28	+2

==== Results by matchday ====
Matchday	1	2	3	4	5	6	7	8	9	10	11	12	13	14	15	16	17	18	19	20	21	22	23	24	25	26	27	28	29	30	31	32	33	34	35	36	37	38
Ground	A	H	A	H	A	H	H	A	A	H	A	H	A	H	A	H	A	H	A	A	H	H	A	A	H	A	H	A	A	H	H	A	H	H	A	H	H	A
Result	W	W	D	L	L	D	W	D	D	D	W	L	W	W	L	D	L	W	W	L	D	L	W	L	D	W	W	W	L	D	W	W	W	D	L	W	D	D
Position	4	3	3	6	9	13	7	10	10	9	7	10	9	6	8	9	9	8	7	8	9	9	7	8	9	8	8	7	9	9	8	8	7	7	8	8	8	8

Source: Statto.com
A = Away; H = Home; W = Win; D = Draw; L = Loss

==== Matches ====
Win Draw Loss

On 17 June 2015, the fixtures for the forthcoming season were announced.

9 August 2015 1	Stoke City	0–1	Liverpool	Stoke-on-Trent
16:00 BST	Afellay (yellow card) 4'; Adam (yellow card) 73'	Report	Škrtel (yellow card) 28'; Milner (yellow card) 39'; Lovren (yellow card) 50'; Gomez (yellow card) 63'; Coutinho 86'	Stadium: Britannia Stadium; Attendance: 27,654; Referee: Anthony Taylor

17 August 2015 2	Liverpool	1–0	Bournemouth	Liverpool
20:00 BST	Benteke 26'; Gomez (yellow card) 75'	Report	O'Kane (yellow card) 34'; Ritchie (yellow card) 76'; Tomlin (yellow card) 77'; Cook (yellow card) 90+1'	Stadium: Anfield; Attendance: 44,102; Referee: Craig Pawson

24 August 2015 3	Arsenal	0–0	Liverpool	Holloway, London
20:00 BST	Gabriel (yellow card) 65'	Report	Škrtel (yellow card) 61'; Can (yellow card) 66'; Gomez (yellow card) 79'; Mignolet (yellow card) 85'	Stadium: Emirates Stadium; Attendance: 60,080; Referee: Michael Oliver

29 August 2015 4	Liverpool	0–3	West Ham United	Liverpool
15:00 BST	Coutinho (yellow card) 45+4' (yellow-red card) 52'; Lucas (yellow card) 70'; Ings (yellow card) 86'; Clyne (yellow card) 90+1'	Report	Lanzini 3', (yellow card) 81'; Noble 29', (yellow card) 38' (red card) 79'; Sakho 90+2'	Stadium: Anfield; Attendance: 43,680; Referee: Kevin Friend

12 September 2015 5	Manchester United	3–1	Liverpool	Manchester
17:30 BST	Blind 49'; Herrera 70' (pen.); Darmian (yellow card) 73'; Martial 86'	Report	Clyne (yellow card) 48'; Milner (yellow card) 75'; Benteke 84'	Stadium: Old Trafford; Attendance: 75,347; Referee: Michael Oliver

20 September 2015 6	Liverpool	1–1	Norwich City	Liverpool
16:00 BST	Milner (yellow card) 3'; Ings 48'	Report	Tettey (yellow card) 53'; Martin 61'; Dorrans (yellow card) 78'	Stadium: Anfield; Attendance: 44,072; Referee: Anthony Taylor

26 September 2015 7	Liverpool	3–2	Aston Villa	Liverpool
15:00 BST	Milner 2'; Sturridge 59', 67'	Report	Gestede 66', 71'	Stadium: Anfield; Attendance: 44,228; Referee: Jon Moss

4 October 2015 8	Everton	1–1	Liverpool	Liverpool
13:30 BST	Barkley (yellow card) 35'; Lukaku 45+1', (yellow card) 90+1'; McCarthy (yellow card) 65'	Report	Can (yellow card) 35'; Ings 41'; Lucas (yellow card) 69'; Sakho (yellow card) 90+1'	Stadium: Goodison Park; Attendance: 39,598; Referee: Martin Atkinson

17 October 2015 9	Tottenham Hotspur	0–0	Liverpool	London
12:45 BST	Lamela (yellow card) 59'	Report	Milner (yellow card) 35'; Lucas (yellow card) 90+1'	Stadium: White Hart Lane; Attendance: 35,926; Referee: Craig Pawson

25 October 2015 10	Liverpool	1–1	Southampton	Liverpool
16:15 GMT	Benteke 77'; Milner (yellow card) 85'	Report	Mané 86', (yellow card) 90+1' (yellow-red card) 90+4'	Stadium: Anfield; Attendance: 44,171; Referee: Andre Marriner

31 October 2015 11	Chelsea	1–3	Liverpool	London
12:45 GMT	Ramires 4'; Mikel (yellow card) 66'	Report	Coutinho (yellow card) 24', (goal) 45+3', 74'; Lucas (yellow card) 58'; Can (yellow card) 65'; Benteke 83', (yellow card) 86'	Stadium: Stamford Bridge; Attendance: 41,577; Referee: Mark Clattenburg

8 November 2015 12	Liverpool	1–2	Crystal Palace	Liverpool
16:00 GMT	Coutinho 42'; Clyne (yellow card) 76'	Report	Bolasie 21'; Dann 82'; Puncheon (yellow card) 57'; Souaré (yellow card) 67'	Stadium: Anfield; Attendance: 44115; Referee: Neil Swarbrick

21 November 2015 13	Manchester City	1–4	Liverpool	Manchester
17:30 GMT	Agüero 44'	Report	Mangala 7' (o.g.); Coutinho 23'; Firmino 32'; Lucas (yellow card) 38'; Can (yellow card) 47'; Škrtel 81'; Clyne (yellow card) 85'	Stadium: City of Manchester Stadium; Attendance: 54,444; Referee: Jon Moss

29 November 2015 14	Liverpool	1–0	Swansea City	Liverpool
16:15 GMT	Milner (yellow card) 25', (goal) 62' (pen.); Škrtel (yellow card) 65'; Mignolet (yellow card) 90+3'	Report	Bartley (yellow card) 70'	Stadium: Anfield; Attendance: 43,905; Referee: Anthony Taylor

6 December 2015 15	Newcastle United	2–0	Liverpool	Newcastle
16:00 GMT	Colback (yellow card) 34'; Anita (yellow card) 60'; Cissé (yellow card) 63'; Škrtel 69' (o.g.); Wijnaldum 90+3'	Report	Lucas (yellow card) 44'	Stadium: St James' Park; Attendance: 51,273; Referee: Andre Marriner

13 December 2015 16	Liverpool	2–2	West Bromwich Albion	Liverpool
16:00 GMT	Henderson 21'; Origi 90+6'	Report	Dawson 30'; Olsson 73'	Stadium: Anfield; Attendance: 44,147; Referee: Craig Pawson

20 December 2015 17	Watford	3–0	Liverpool	Watford
13:30 GMT	Aké 3'; Ighalo 15', 85'; Britos (yellow card) 78'	Report		Stadium: Vicarage Road; Attendance: 20,707; Referee: Mark Clattenburg

26 December 2015 18	Liverpool	1–0	Leicester City	Liverpool
15:00 GMT	Lallana (yellow card) 45+1'; Can (yellow card) 52'; Benteke 63'	Report	Huth (yellow card) 62'	Stadium: Anfield; Attendance: 44,123; Referee: Martin Atkinson

30 December 2015 19	Sunderland	0–1	Liverpool	Sunderland
19:45 GMT	Lens (yellow card) 86'	Report	Benteke (yellow card) 19', (goal) 46'; Can (yellow card) 58'; Moreno (yellow card) 77'	Stadium: Stadium of Light; Attendance: 45,765; Referee: Kevin Friend

2 January 2016 20	West Ham United	2–0	Liverpool	London
12:45 GMT	Antonio 10'; Lanzini (yellow card) 18'; Carroll 55'	Report	Lucas (yellow card) 24'	Stadium: Boleyn Ground; Attendance: 34,977; Referee: Robert Madley

13 January 2016 21	Liverpool	3–3	Arsenal	Liverpool
20:00 GMT	Firmino 10', 19', (yellow card) 10'; Clyne (yellow card) 53'; Allen 90'	Report	Ramsey 14'; Giroud 25', 55'	Stadium: Anfield; Attendance: 44,109; Referee: Mike Jones

17 January 2016 22	Liverpool	0–1	Manchester United	Liverpool
14:05 GMT		Report	Smalling (yellow card) 65'; Fellaini (yellow card) 75'; Rooney 78'	Stadium: Anfield; Attendance: 43,865; Referee: Mark Clattenburg

23 January 2016 23	Norwich City	4–5	Liverpool	Norwich
12:45 GMT	Mbokani 29'; Naismith 41'; Hoolahan 54' (pen.); Bassong 90+2'	Report	Firmino 18', 63'; Henderson 55'; Milner 75'; Lallana 90+5', (yellow card) 90+5'	Stadium: Carrow Road; Attendance: 27,108; Referee: Lee Mason

2 February 2016 24	Leicester City	2–0	Liverpool	Leicester
19:45 GMT	Vardy 60', 71'	Report	Lucas (yellow card) 86'	Stadium: King Power Stadium; Attendance: 32,121; Referee: Andre Marriner

6 February 2016 25	Liverpool	2–2	Sunderland	Liverpool
16:00 GMT	Firmino 59'; Lallana 70'; Moreno (yellow card) 81'	Report	N'Doye (yellow card) 39'; Johnson 82'; Defoe 89'	Stadium: Anfield; Attendance: 44,179; Referee: Robert Madley

14 February 2016 26	Aston Villa	0–6	Liverpool	Birmingham
14:05 GMT	Bacuna (yellow card) 42'; Westwood (yellow card) 65'; Veretout (yellow card) 77'	Report	Sturridge 16'; Milner 25'; Can 58'; Origi 63'; Clyne 65'; Touré 71'; Stewart (yellow card) 84'	Stadium: Villa Park; Attendance: 35,798; Referee: Neil Swarbrick

2 March 2016 27	Liverpool	3–0	Manchester City	Liverpool
20:00 GMT	Lallana 34'; Milner 41'; Firmino 57'	Report	Navas (yellow card) 68'	Stadium: Anfield; Attendance: 43,597; Referee: Martin Atkinson

6 March 2016 28	Crystal Palace	1–2	Liverpool	London
13:30 GMT	Dann (yellow card) 11'; Ledley 48'	Report	Henderson (yellow card) 10'; Milner (yellow card) 40' (yellow-red card) 62'; Firmino 72'; Moreno (yellow card) 86'; Benteke 90+6' (pen.)	Stadium: Selhurst Park; Attendance: 24,709; Referee: Andre Marriner

20 March 2016 29	Southampton	3–2	Liverpool	Southampton
13:30 GMT	Mané 64', 86', (yellow card) 86'; Pellè 83'	Report	Coutinho 17'; Sturridge 22'; Lovren (yellow card) 25'; Can (yellow card) 48'; Škrtel (yellow card) 49'	Stadium: St Mary's Stadium; Attendance: 31,596; Referee: Roger East

2 April 2016 30	Liverpool	1–1	Tottenham Hotspur	Liverpool
17:30 BST	Coutinho (yellow card) 24', (goal) 51'; Can (yellow card) 64'	Report	Kane 63'	Stadium: Anfield; Attendance: 44,062; Referee: Jonathan Moss

10 April 2016 31	Liverpool	4–1	Stoke City	Liverpool
16:00 BST	Moreno 8'; Sturridge 32'; Origi 50', 65'	Report	Bojan 22'; Pieters (yellow card) 26'; Shawcross (yellow card) 82'	Stadium: Anfield; Attendance: 43,688; Referee: Mark Clattenburg

17 April 2016 32	Bournemouth	1–2	Liverpool	Bournemouth
13:30 BST	King 90+3'	Report	Firmino 41'; Sturridge 45+2'	Stadium: Dean Court; Attendance: 11,386; Referee: Mike Jones

20 April 2016 33	Liverpool	4–0	Everton	Liverpool
20:00 BST	Milner (yellow card) 8'; Origi 43'; Sakho 45+2'; Sturridge 61'; Coutinho 76'	Report	Lennon (yellow card) 42'; Funes Mori (red card) 50'	Stadium: Anfield; Attendance: 43,854; Referee: Bobby Madley

23 April 2016 34	Liverpool	2–2	Newcastle United	Liverpool
15:00 BST	Sturridge 2'; Lallana 30'; Milner (yellow card) 53'	Report	Tioté (yellow card) 22'; Cissé 48'; Colback 66'	Stadium: Anfield; Attendance: 43,837; Referee: Andre Marriner

1 May 2016 35	Swansea City	3–1	Liverpool	Swansea
12:00 BST	Ayew 20', 67'; Cork 33', (yellow card) 41'; Rangel (yellow card) 74'	Report	Smith (yellow card) 27' (yellow-red card) 76'; Clyne (yellow card) 39'; Benteke 65'; Škrtel (yellow card) 77'	Stadium: Liberty Stadium; Attendance: 20,972; Referee: Roger East

8 May 2016 36	Liverpool	2–0	Watford	Liverpool
16:00 BST	Allen 35'; Flanagan (yellow card) 63'; Firmino 76'	Report	Britos (yellow card) 59'; Berghuis (yellow card) 73'	Stadium: Anfield; Attendance: 43,341; Referee: Lee Mason

11 May 2016 37	Liverpool	1–1	Chelsea	Liverpool
20:00 BST	Can (yellow card) 44'; Touré (yellow card) 48'; Milner (yellow card) 73'; Benteke 90+2'	Report	Hazard 32'; Azpilicueta (yellow card) 87'	Stadium: Anfield; Attendance: 43,210; Referee: Michael Oliver

15 May 2016 38	West Bromwich Albion	1–1	Liverpool	West Bromwich
15:00 BST	Rondón 13'; McClean (yellow card) 45+2'; Roberts (yellow card) 74'; Evans (yellow card) 87'	Report	Ibe 23'; Smith (yellow card) 40'	Stadium: The Hawthorns; Attendance: 26,196; Referee: Bobby Madley

=== FA Cup ===
Win Draw Loss

8 January 2016 Third round	Exeter City	2–2	Liverpool	Exeter
19:55 GMT	Nichols 9'; Holmes 45'	Report	Sinclair 12'; Smith 73'	Stadium: St James Park; Attendance: 8,298; Referee: Stuart Attwell

20 January 2016 Replay	Liverpool	3–0	Exeter City	Liverpool
20:00 GMT	Allen 10'; Ojo 75'; Texeira 82'	Report		Stadium: Anfield; Attendance: 43,292; Referee: Neil Swarbrick

30 January 2016 Fourth round	Liverpool	0–0	West Ham United	Liverpool
17:30 GMT	Lovren (yellow card) 54'	Report		Stadium: Anfield; Attendance: 44,006; Referee: Martin Atkinson

9 February 2016 Replay	West Ham United	2–1 (a.e.t.)	Liverpool	London
19:45 GMT	Antonio 45', (yellow card) 87'; Ogbonna 120+1'	Report	Stewart (yellow card) 26'; Coutinho 48'	Stadium: Boleyn Ground; Attendance: 34,433; Referee: Roger East

=== League Cup ===
Win Draw Loss

23 September 2015 Third round	Liverpool	1–1 (a.e.t.) (3–2 p)	Carlisle United	Liverpool
20:00 BST	Ings 23'; Origi (yellow card) 90+2'	Report	Asamoah 34'	Stadium: Anfield; Attendance: 42,518; Referee: Andrew Madley
	Penalties
	Milner (penalty scored); Can (penalty scored); Lallana (penalty missed); Coutinho (penalty missed); Ings (penalty scored)		(penalty missed) Grainger; (penalty scored) Dicker; (penalty missed) Jouce; (penalty scored) McQueen; (penalty missed) Hery

28 October 2015 Fourth round	Liverpool	1–0	Bournemouth	Liverpool
19:45 GMT	Clyne 17'; Allen (yellow card) 61'	Report	MacDonald (yellow card) 80'	Stadium: Anfield; Attendance: 41,948; Referee: Mike Jones

2 December 2015 Fifth round	Southampton	1–6	Liverpool	Southampton
19:45 GMT	Mané 1'	Report	Randall (yellow card) 8'; Sturridge 25', 29'; Origi 45', 68', 86'; Can (yellow card) 65'; Ibe 73'	Stadium: St Mary's Stadium; Attendance: 31,592; Referee: Robert Madley

5 January 2016 Semi-finals First leg	Stoke City	0–1	Liverpool	Stoke-on-Trent
20:00 GMT		Report	Ibe 37'; Mignolet (yellow card) 73'	Stadium: Britannia Stadium; Attendance: 27,369; Referee: Anthony Taylor

26 January 2016 Semi-finals Second leg	Liverpool	0–1 (a.e.t.) (1–1 agg.) (6−5 p)	Stoke City	Liverpool
19:45 GMT	Flanagan (yellow card) 85'; Allen (yellow card) 90+1'	Report	Muniesa (yellow card) 24'; Arnautović 45+1'	Stadium: Anfield; Attendance: 43,091; Referee: Jonathan Moss
	Penalties
	Lallana (penalty scored); Can (penalty missed); Benteke (penalty scored); Firmino (penalty scored); Milner (penalty scored); Lucas (penalty scored); Allen (penalty scored)		(penalty scored) Walters; (penalty missed) Crouch; (penalty scored) Whelan; (penalty scored) Afellay; (penalty scored) Shaqiri; (penalty scored) Van Ginkel; (penalty missed) Muniesa

28 February 2016 Final	Liverpool	1–1 (a.e.t.) (1−3 p)	Manchester City	London
16:30 GMT	Clyne (yellow card) 53'; Moreno (yellow card) 65'; Coutinho 83', (yellow card) 84'; Can (yellow card) 85'; Lallana (yellow card) 118'	Report	Fernandinho 49', (yellow card) 119'; Kompany (yellow card) 87'; Otamendi (yellow card) 109'; Touré (yellow card) 118'	Stadium: Wembley Stadium; Attendance: 86,206; Referee: Michael Oliver
	Penalties
	Can (penalty scored); Lucas (penalty missed); Coutinho (penalty missed); Lallana (penalty missed)		(penalty missed) Fernandinho; (penalty scored) Navas; (penalty scored) Agüero; (penalty scored) Touré

=== UEFA Europa League ===
==== Group stage ====
On 28 August 2015, the draw for the group stage was made in Monaco. Liverpool were drawn with Rubin Kazan, Bordeaux and Sion.

Pos	Team	Pld	W	D	L	GF	GA	GD	Pts	Qualification	LIV	SIO	RUB	BOR
1	(England) Liverpool	6	2	4	0	6	4	+2	10	Advance to knockout phase	—	1–1	1–1	2–1
2	(Switzerland) Sion	6	2	3	1	5	5	0	9	Advance to knockout phase	0–0	—	2–1	1–1
3	(Russia) Rubin Kazan	6	1	3	2	6	6	0	6		0–1	2–0	—	0–0
4	(France) Bordeaux	6	0	4	2	5	7	−2	4		1–1	0–1	2–2	—

Source: Soccerway
Rules for classification: Group stage tiebreakers

Win Draw Loss

17 September 2015 1	Bordeaux (France)	1–1	(England) Liverpool	Bordeaux, France
18:00 BST	Chantôme (yellow card) 38'; Jussiê 81'	UEFA Report	Touré (yellow card) 12'; Lallana 65'	Stadium: Nouveau Stade de Bordeaux; Attendance: 35,328; Referee: Alberto Undiano Mallenco (Spain)

1 October 2015 2	Liverpool (England)	1–1	(Switzerland) Sion	Liverpool, England
20:05 BST	Lallana 4'; Moreno (yellow card) 81'	UEFA Report	Assifuah 17'; Kouassi (yellow card) 76'	Stadium: Anfield; Attendance: 37,252; Referee: Slavko Vinčić (Slovenia)

22 October 2015 3	Liverpool (England)	1–1	(Russia) Rubin Kazan	Liverpool, England
20:05 BST	Škrtel (yellow card) 35'; Can 37'; Allen (yellow card) 41'	UEFA Report	Dević 15'; Kuzmin (yellow card) 19' (yellow-red card) 36'	Stadium: Anfield; Attendance: 42,951; Referee: Robert Schörgenhofer (Austria)

5 November 2015 4	Rubin Kazan (Russia)	0–1	(England) Liverpool	Kazan, Tatarstan, Russia
18:00 GMT		UEFA Report	Ibe 52'; Lovren (yellow card) 76'	Stadium: Kazan Arena; Attendance: 41,585; Referee: Kevin Blom (Netherlands)

26 November 2015 5	Liverpool (England)	2–1	(France) Bordeaux	Liverpool, England
20:05 GMT	Milner 38' (pen.); Benteke 45+1', (yellow card) 82'; Lucas (yellow card) 60'; Ibe (yellow card) 62'	UEFA Report	Saivet 33'; Sané (yellow card) 37'; Contento (yellow card) 88'	Stadium: Anfield; Attendance: 42,525; Referee: Alon Yefet (Israel)

10 December 2015 6	Sion (Switzerland)	0–0	(England) Liverpool	Sion, Valais, Switzerland
18:00 GMT	Assifuah (yellow card) 34'; Kouassi (yellow card) 52'	UEFA Report	Clyne (yellow card) 82'	Stadium: Stade de Tourbillon; Attendance: 10,000; Referee: Michael Koukoulakis (Greece)

==== Round of 32 ====
18 February 2016 First leg	FC Augsburg (Germany)	0–0	(England) Liverpool	Augsburg, Germany
20:05 GMT	Janker (yellow card) 20'; Kohr (yellow card) 59'; Werner (yellow card) 73'; Feulner (yellow card) 90+2'	UEFA Report	Moreno (yellow card) 77'	Stadium: WWK ARENA; Attendance: 25,000; Referee: David Fernández Borbalán (Spain)

25 February 2016 Second leg	Liverpool (England)	1–0 (1–0 agg.)	(Germany) FC Augsburg	Liverpool, England
18:00 GMT	Milner 5' (pen.); Firmino (yellow card) 57'	UEFA Report	Stafylidis (yellow card) 26'; Caiuby (yellow card) 45'; Janker (yellow card) 87'	Stadium: Anfield; Attendance: 43,081; Referee: Clément Turpin (France)

==== Round of 16 ====
10 March 2016 First leg	Liverpool (England)	2–0	(England) Manchester United	Liverpool, England
20:05 GMT	Henderson (yellow card) 3'; Sturridge 20' (pen.); Lovren (yellow card) 43'; Coutinho (yellow card) 49'; Firmino 73'	UEFA Report	Depay (yellow card) 19'; Rashford (yellow card) 45'; Fellaini (yellow card) 60'	Stadium: Anfield; Attendance: 43,228; Referee: Carlos Velasco Carballo (Spain)

17 March 2016 Second leg	Manchester United (England)	1–1 (1–3 agg.)	(England) Liverpool	Manchester, England
20:05 GMT	Martial 32' (pen.); Blind (yellow card) 33'; Fellaini (yellow card) 50'; Schweinsteiger (yellow card) 80'	UEFA Report	Coutinho (yellow card) 42', (goal) 45'; Clyne (yellow card) 51'; Firmino (yellow card) 83'	Stadium: Old Trafford; Attendance: 75,180; Referee: Milorad Mažić (Serbia)

==== Quarter-finals ====
7 April 2016 First leg	Borussia Dortmund (Germany)	1–1	(England) Liverpool	Dortmund, Germany
20:05 BST	Weidenfeller (yellow card) 45+5'; Hummels 48'; Reus (yellow card) 52'; Papastathopoulos (yellow card) 81'	UEFA Report	Can (yellow card) 9'; Origi 36'; Lallana (yellow card) 44'	Stadium: Signal Iduna Park; Attendance: 65,848; Referee: Carlos Velasco Carballo (Spain)

14 April 2016 Second leg	Liverpool (England)	4–3 (5–4 agg.)	(Germany) Borussia Dortmund	Liverpool, England
20:05 BST	Origi 48'; Coutinho 66'; Sakho 78', (yellow card) 90+2'; Lovren 90+1'	UEFA Report	Mkhitaryan 5'; Aubameyang 9'; Hummels (yellow card) 53'; Reus 57'; Piszczek (yellow card) 75'; Schmelzer (yellow card) 90+1'	Stadium: Anfield; Attendance: 44,742; Referee: Cüneyt Çakır (Turkey)

==== Semi-finals ====
28 April 2016 First leg	Villarreal (Spain)	1–0	(England) Liverpool	Villarreal, Spain
20:05 BST	Costa (yellow card) 60'; Adrián 90+2'	UEFA Report		Stadium: El Madrigal; Attendance: 21,606; Referee: Damir Skomina (Slovenia)

5 May 2016 Second leg	Liverpool (England)	3–0 (3–1 agg.)	(Spain) Villarreal	Liverpool, England
20:05 BST	Bruno Soriano 7' (o.g.); Clyne (yellow card) 35'; Sturridge 63'; Lallana 81'	UEFA Report	Ruiz (yellow card) 30' (yellow-red card) 71'; Soldado (yellow card) 40'; Suárez (yellow card) 90+4'	Stadium: Anfield; Attendance: 43,074; Referee: Viktor Kassai (Hungary)

==== Final ====
18 May 2016 Final	Liverpool (England)	1–3	(Spain) Sevilla	Basel, Switzerland
19:45 BST	Lovren (yellow card) 30'; Sturridge 35'; Škrtel (yellow card) 70'; Origi (yellow card) 72'; Clyne (yellow card) 90+4'	UEFA Report	Gameiro 46'; Vitolo (yellow card) 56'; Banega (yellow card) 57'; Coke 64', 70'; Rami (yellow card) 77'; Mariano (yellow card) 84'	Stadium: St. Jakob-Park; Attendance: 34,429; Referee: Jonas Eriksson (Sweden)

== Squad statistics ==
=== Appearances ===
Numbers in parentheses denote appearances as substitute.
Players with no appearances not included in the list.

No.	Pos.	Nat.	Name	Premier League	FA Cup	League Cup	Europa League	Total
No.	Pos.	Nat.	Name	Apps	Apps	Apps	Apps	Apps
2	DF	(England)	Nathaniel Clyne	33	1	4	14	52
4	DF	(Ivory Coast)	Kolo Touré	9 (5)	0	3 (1)	8	20 (6)
6	DF	(Croatia)	Dejan Lovren	22 (2)	1	4	10	38 (2)
7	MF	(England)	James Milner	28	0 (1)	3 (1)	12	44 (2)
9	FW	(Belgium)	Christian Benteke	14 (15)	4	0 (2)	2 (5)	20 (22)
10	MF	(Brazil)	Philippe Coutinho	24 (2)	1	1 (1)	12 (2)	38 (5)
11	FW	(Brazil)	Roberto Firmino	24 (7)	0	4	12 (2)	40 (9)
12	DF	(England)	Joe Gomez	5	0	0	2	7
14	MF	(England)	Jordan Henderson	15 (2)	0	2 (1)	6	23 (3)
15	FW	(England)	Daniel Sturridge	11 (3)	0 (1)	2	6 (2)	19 (6)
17	DF	(France)	Mamadou Sakho	21 (1)	0	2	8 (2)	31 (3)
18	DF	(Spain)	Alberto Moreno	28 (4)	0	5	11 (2)	44 (6)
19	DF	(England)	Steven Caulker	0 (3)	1	0	0	1 (3)
20	MF	(England)	Adam Lallana	23 (7)	0	4 (2)	11 (2)	38 (11)
21	MF	(Brazil)	Lucas	21 (6)	1	4 (1)	3 (4)	29 (11)
22	GK	(Belgium)	Simon Mignolet	34	3	3	15	55
23	MF	(Germany)	Emre Can	28 (2)	0	5	13 (1)	46 (3)
24	MF	(Wales)	Joe Allen	8 (11)	2	4 (1)	5 (6)	19 (18)
26	DF	(Portugal)	Tiago Ilori	0	3	0	0	3
27	FW	(Belgium)	Divock Origi	7 (9)	0 (1)	2 (2)	6 (6)	15 (18)
28	FW	(England)	Danny Ings	3 (3)	0	1	1 (1)	5 (4)
32	MF	(England)	Cameron Brannagan	1 (2)	3	1	0 (2)	4 (4)
33	MF	(England)	Jordon Ibe	12 (15)	3	1 (4)	4 (2)	20 (21)
34	GK	(Hungary)	Ádám Bogdán	2	1	3	0	6
35	MF	(England)	Kevin Stewart	6 (1)	4	0	0	10 (1)
37	DF	(Slovakia)	Martin Škrtel	21 (1)	0	2 (1)	1 (1)	24 (3)
38	DF	(England)	Jon Flanagan	5	1 (1)	1	0	7 (1)
40	MF	(England)	Ryan Kent	0	1	0	0	1
44	DF	(Australia)	Brad Smith	3 (1)	4	0 (1)	1	8 (2)
46	MF	(England)	Jordan Rossiter	0 (1)	0	0	2 (1)	2 (2)
48	FW	(England)	Jerome Sinclair	0	1 (1)	0	0	1 (1)
52	GK	(Wales)	Danny Ward	2	0	0	0	2
53	MF	(Portugal)	João Carlos Teixeira	0 (1)	4	1	0 (1)	5 (2)
54	MF	(England)	Sheyi Ojo	5 (3)	0 (3)	0	0	5 (6)
56	DF	(England)	Connor Randall	2 (1)	2	2	0	6 (1)
57	DF	(England)	Joe Maguire	0	0 (1)	0	0	0 (1)
64	MF	(Spain)	Sergi Canós	0 (1)	0	0	0	0 (1)
68	MF	(Spain)	Pedro Chirivella	1	1 (2)	0	0 (1)	2 (3)
Players who went out on loan or left permanently but made appearances for Liverpool prior to departing
3	DF	(Spain)	José Enrique	0	2 (1)	0	0	2 (1)

=== Goalscorers ===
Includes all competitive matches.

Rank	Pos.	No.	Player	Premier League	FA Cup	League Cup	Europa League	Total
1	FW	15	(England) Daniel Sturridge	8	0	2	3	13
2	MF	10	(Brazil) Philippe Coutinho	8	1	1	2	12
3	FW	11	(Brazil) Roberto Firmino	10	0	0	1	11
4	FW	9	(Belgium) Christian Benteke	9	0	0	1	10
4	FW	27	(Belgium) Divock Origi	5	0	3	2	10
6	MF	7	(England) James Milner	5	0	0	2	7
6	MF	20	(England) Adam Lallana	4	0	0	3	7
8	MF	33	(England) Jordon Ibe	1	0	2	1	4
9	MF	24	(Wales) Joe Allen	2	1	0	0	3
9	FW	28	(England) Danny Ings	2	0	1	0	3
11	DF	2	(England) Nathaniel Clyne	1	0	1	0	2
11	MF	14	(England) Jordan Henderson	2	0	0	0	2
11	DF	17	(France) Mamadou Sakho	1	0	0	1	2
11	MF	23	(Germany) Emre Can	1	0	0	1	2
15	DF	4	(Ivory Coast) Kolo Touré	1	0	0	0	1
15	DF	6	(Croatia) Dejan Lovren	0	0	0	1	1
15	DF	18	(Spain) Alberto Moreno	1	0	0	0	1
15	DF	37	(Slovakia) Martin Škrtel	1	0	0	0	1
15	DF	44	(Australia) Brad Smith	0	1	0	0	1
15	FW	48	(England) Jerome Sinclair	0	1	0	0	1
15	MF	53	(Portugal) João Carlos Teixeira	0	1	0	0	1
15	MF	54	(England) Sheyi Ojo	0	1	0	0	1
Own Goal				1	0	0	1	2
TOTALS				63	6	10	19	98

=== Captains ===
Includes all competitive matches. The list is sorted by shirt number when total appearances as captain are equal. Only includes players who started games as captain.

No.	Pos.	Nat.	Name	Premier League	FA Cup	League Cup	Europa League	Total
No.	Pos.	Nat.	Name	Apps	Apps	Apps	Apps	Apps
7	MF	(England)	James Milner	16	0	1	7	24
14	MF	(England)	Jordan Henderson	15	0	2	6	23
21	MF	(Brazil)	Lucas	5	1	2	0	8
4	DF	(Ivory Coast)	Kolo Touré	0	0	1	1	2
3	DF	(Spain)	José Enrique	0	1	0	0	1
9	FW	(Belgium)	Christian Benteke	0	1	0	0	1
17	DF	(France)	Mamadou Sakho	0	0	0	1	1
24	MF	(Wales)	Joe Allen	0	1	0	0	1
37	DF	(Slovakia)	Martin Škrtel	1	0	0	0	1
38	DF	(England)	Jon Flanagan	1	0	0	0	1

=== Clean sheets ===
Includes all competitive matches. The list is sorted alphabetically by surname when total clean sheets are equal.

No.	Nat.	Player	Matches Played	Clean Sheet %	Premier League	FA Cup	League Cup	UEFA Europa League	Total
22	(Belgium)	Simon Mignolet	55	36.36%	11	2	1	6	20
34	(Hungary)	Ádám Bogdán	6	16.67%	0	0	1	0	1
52	(Wales)	Danny Ward	2	0%	0	0	0	0	0
Totals			63	33.33%	11	2	2	6	21

=== Summary ===
Games played	63 (38 Premier League)
Games won	27 (16 Premier League)
Games drawn	21 (12 Premier League)
Games lost	15 (10 Premier League)
Goals scored	98 (63 Premier League)
Goals conceded	71 (50 Premier League)
Goal difference	+27 (+13 Premier League)
Clean sheets	21 (11 Premier League)
Most Yellow cards	12 (Germany) Emre Can
Red cards	1 (Brazil) Philippe Coutinho, (England) James Milner, (Australia) Brad Smith
Most appearances	55 (Belgium) Simon Mignolet
Top scorer	13 (England) Daniel Sturridge
Winning percentage	Overall: 27/63 (42.85%)

=== Disciplinary record ===
No.	Pos.	Name	Premier League		FA Cup		League Cup		UEFA Europa League		Total	
No.	Pos.	Name	Yellow card	Red card	Yellow card	Red card	Yellow card	Red card	Yellow card	Red card	Yellow card	Red card
23	MF	(Germany) Emre Can	9	0	0	0	2	0	1	0	12	0
2	DF	(England) Nathaniel Clyne	6	0	0	0	1	0	4	0	11	0
7	MF	(England) James Milner	9	1	0	0	0	0	0	0	9	1
21	MF	(Brazil) Lucas	8	0	0	0	0	0	1	0	9	0
6	DF	(Croatia) Dejan Lovren	2	0	1	0	0	0	3	0	6	0
18	DF	(Spain) Alberto Moreno	3	0	0	0	1	0	2	0	6	0
37	DF	(Slovakia) Martin Škrtel	6	0	0	0	0	0	0	0	6	0
10	MF	(Brazil) Philippe Coutinho	2	1	0	0	1	0	2	0	5	1
20	MF	(England) Adam Lallana	2	0	0	0	1	0	1	0	4	0
9	FW	(Belgium) Christian Benteke	2	0	0	0	0	0	1	0	3	0
11	FW	(Brazil) Roberto Firmino	1	0	0	0	0	0	2	0	3	0
12	DF	(England) Joe Gomez	3	0	0	0	0	0	0	0	3	0
22	GK	(Belgium) Simon Mignolet	2	0	0	0	1	0	0	0	3	0
24	MF	(Wales) Joe Allen	0	0	0	0	2	0	1	0	3	0
4	DF	(Ivory Coast) Kolo Touré	1	0	0	0	0	0	1	0	2	0
14	MF	(England) Jordan Henderson	1	0	0	0	0	0	1	0	2	0
17	DF	(France) Mamadou Sakho	0	0	0	0	1	0	1	0	2	0
27	FW	(Belgium) Divock Origi	0	0	0	0	1	0	1	0	2	0
35	MF	(England) Kevin Stewart	1	0	1	0	0	0	0	0	2	0
38	DF	(England) Jon Flanagan	1	0	0	0	1	0	0	0	2	0
44	DF	(Australia) Brad Smith	1	1	0	0	0	0	0	0	1	1
28	FW	(England) Danny Ings	1	0	0	0	0	0	0	0	1	0
33	MF	(England) Jordon Ibe	0	0	0	0	0	0	1	0	1	0
56	DF	(England) Connor Randall	0	0	0	0	1	0	0	0	1	0
Total			58	3	2	0	7	0	22	0	89	3

== Club awards ==
=== End-of-season awards ===
The 2016 Liverpool FC Players’ Awards event was held at the Exhibition Centre on 12 May 2016.

- Liverpool Players Player of the Year Award: Philippe Coutinho
- Liverpool Supporters Player of the Year Award: Philippe Coutinho
- Liverpool Supporters Young Player of the Year Award: Emre Can
- Goal of the Season Award: Philippe Coutinho (vs. Manchester United, 17 March 2016)
- Performance of the Year: Philippe Coutinho (vs. Manchester City, 21 November 2015)
- Academy's Players’ Player of the Year: Brad Smith
- Liverpool Ladies FC Players’ Player of the Season: Martha Harris
- Lifetime Achievement Award: Steve Heighway
- Bill Shankly Community Award: Marie Rooney from Anfield Sports and Community Centre
- Supporters’ Club of the Year: Gauteng, South Africa
- Staff Recognition Award: Terry Forsyth

=== Liverpool Standard Chartered Player of the Month award ===
Awarded monthly to the player that was chosen by fans voting on liverpoolfc.com

Month	Player	Votes
August	(Brazil) Philippe Coutinho	
September	(England) Danny Ings	
October	(France) Mamadou Sakho	
November	(Brazil) Philippe Coutinho	
December	(Croatia) Dejan Lovren	
January	(Brazil) Roberto Firmino	62%
February	(Brazil) Lucas Leiva	34%
March	(Brazil) Philippe Coutinho	37%
April	(Belgium) Divock Origi	43%
