= Emre Can =

German footballer (born 1994)

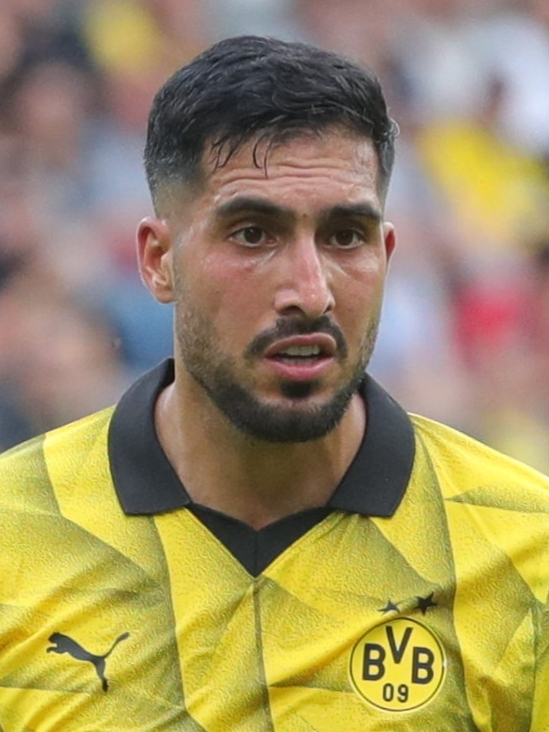
- Can playing for Borussia Dortmund in 2023

Personal information
- Full name: Emre Can
- Date of birth: 12 January 1994 (age 32)
- Place of birth: Frankfurt, Germany
- Height: 1.86 m (6 ft 1 in)
- Positions: Defensive midfielder; centre-back

Team information
- Current team: Borussia Dortmund
- Number: 23

Youth career
- 2000–2006: SV Blau-Gelb Frankfurt
- 2006–2009: Eintracht Frankfurt
- 2009–2011: Bayern Munich

Senior career*
Years	Team	Apps	(Gls)
2011–2013	Bayern Munich II	31	(3)
2012–2013	Bayern Munich	4	(1)
2013–2014	Bayer Leverkusen	29	(3)
2014–2018	Liverpool	115	(10)
2018–2020	Juventus	37	(4)
2020	→ Borussia Dortmund (loan)	12	(2)
2020–	Borussia Dortmund	144	(16)

International career^{‡}
2009	Germany U15	1	(0)
2009–2010	Germany U16	8	(2)
2010–2011	Germany U17	23	(3)
2012–2013	Germany U19	5	(0)
2013–2015	Germany U21	13	(1)
2015–	Germany	48	(2)
Medal record
Men's football
Representing Germany
FIFA Confederations Cup
Winner	2017 Russia
FIFA U-17 World Cup
Third place	2011 Mexico
UEFA European Under-17 Championship
Runner-up	2011 Serbia
- * Club domestic league appearances and goals as of 20:30, 28 February 2026 (UTC) ‡ National team caps and goals as of 20:53, 10 September 2024 (UTC)

Emre Can (Turkish pronunciation: [ˈemɾe ˈdʒan]; born 12 January 1994) is a German professional footballer who plays as a defensive midfielder or centre-back for Bundesliga club Borussia Dortmund, which he captains, and the Germany national team.

He began his senior career at Bayern Munich, playing mostly in the club's reserve side before his 2013 transfer to Bayer Leverkusen. A season later, he was signed by Premier League club Liverpool for £9.75 million where he made over 150 appearances across all tiers of competition and would join Juventus in 2018. In 2020 he was loaned to Borussia Dortmund; a few weeks later he moved to the team under a permanent deal.

He represented Germany from U15 to U21, and featured at the 2015 U21 European Championship. He made his senior debut in September 2015 and was selected for the 2016 European Championship. The following year, he was with Germany when they won the 2017 FIFA Confederations Cup in Russia, making his first senior international goal.

== Club career ==
=== Early career ===
Born in 1994 in Frankfurt, Can joined local side SV Blau-Gelb Frankfurt at the age of six and remained at the club until 2006, when he joined the youth academy of Eintracht Frankfurt. During his time with both Frankfurt clubs, he predominantly played in midfield where he assumed an attacking role. In 2009, at the age of 15, he relocated to Bavaria after being signed by Bayern Munich.

=== Bayern Munich ===
During his first year in Bayern's academy, Can was used in the centre-back position before returning to midfield when he began playing for Bayern Munich II in the Regionalliga Bayern. He made his first team debut in the 2012 DFL-Supercup and his Bundesliga debut against 1. FC Nürnberg on 13 April 2013. His first and only league goal for the club came on 27 April 2013 in a 1–0 home win over SC Freiburg. Competing with Bastian Schweinsteiger, Luiz Gustavo and Javi Martínez for a spot in Bayern's midfield, he ultimately made only seven senior appearances before signing for fellow Bundesliga side Bayer Leverkusen in 2013 in search of regular game-time.

=== Bayer Leverkusen ===
On 2 August 2013, Can signed a four-year deal with Bayer 04 Leverkusen. A buy-back clause was included in the agreement which would have allowed Bayern to re-sign Can for a set-fee in 2015, an option they later declined to exercise.

Can made his debut for die Werkself on 31 August 2013, coming on as an 80th-minute substitute for Stefan Reinartz in a 2–0 defeat at FC Schalke 04. His first goal for the club came on 26 October when he scored the winner against FC Augsburg in a 2–1 victory. Can made his UEFA Champions League debut against Manchester United at Old Trafford later that month in a match which ended 4–2 in the favour of the English side.

In his only season at Leverkusen, Can scored four goals and made four assists in 39 appearances, while largely operating in a defensive capacity. His performances while at Leverkusen sparked interest from English club Liverpool, who noted Can's performances in both the Bundesliga and Champions League.

=== Liverpool ===
On 5 June 2014, Bayer Leverkusen confirmed that Can would join Liverpool after the Merseyside club activated his £9.75 million (€12 million) release clause. Liverpool manager Brendan Rodgers described Can in a press conference later in the week as an "inspirational young talent". The transfer was completed on 3 July 2014.

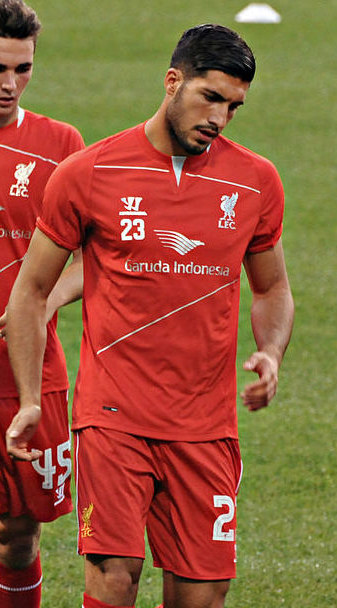
Can training with Liverpool in 2014

==== 2014–15 season ====
Can made his competitive debut for the club on 25 August 2014, coming on as a substitute for Joe Allen in a 3–1 away defeat against Manchester City. The following month, he picked up an ankle injury while on duty with the German under-21 side and was sidelined for six weeks. On 19 October, following his return from injury, Can made his first start for Liverpool in a 3–2 win against Queens Park Rangers.

He scored his first Liverpool goal on 8 November with a long-range shot past Thibaut Courtois, opening the scoring in an eventual 2–1 defeat to Chelsea. Against the same opponent in a League Cup semi-final defeat on 27 January 2015, Can was stamped on by Chelsea forward Diego Costa; referee Michael Oliver did not penalize the incident, but Costa was retrospectively banned for three matches by the FA. In April, Can received his first red card for Liverpool in 4–1 loss to Arsenal at the Emirates Stadium. Though naturally a midfielder, Can spent much of his debut season playing in defence, and ultimately featured 40 times for the campaign across all competitions.

==== 2015–16 season ====
On 22 October 2015, in Liverpool's UEFA Europa League match against Rubin Kazan at Anfield, Can scored his first goal of the 2015–16 season. It was the club's first goal under the management of Can's compatriot and new manager Jürgen Klopp. On 14 February 2016, he scored his first league goal of the season in a 6–0 win over Aston Villa. While Can was often used at centre-back or full-back under Rodgers, with Klopp's arrival he was moved to his preferred position of central midfielder. He was praised by Klopp for his improvement and became a key cog in Liverpool's midfield.

On 14 April 2016, Can ruptured his ankle ligaments in the Europa League quarter-final against Borussia Dortmund. Initially, he was ruled out for the rest of the domestic season. However, he returned ahead of schedule and played in the second leg of the semi-final against Villarreal. Can later revealed that he trained for 8 hours a day for 3 weeks to get fit for the Villarreal game.

==== 2016–17 season ====
On 29 October 2016, Can scored his first goal of the season, scoring the opening goal in Liverpool's 4–2 win over Crystal Palace. On 6 November, Can scored Liverpool's third goal in their 6–1 win over Watford, which took Liverpool to 1st position in the Premier League for the first time under Jürgen Klopp. On 4 December, Can scored in Liverpool's 4–3 defeat to Bournemouth. On 12 March 2017, Can scored the winning goal in Liverpool's 2–1 win over Burnley, in what was called by Klopp an "ugly win". On 1 May 2017, Can scored an overhead kick in a 1–0 win over Watford, with the strike later earning him the BBC Goal of the Season and Carling Goal of the Season awards.

==== 2017–18 season ====
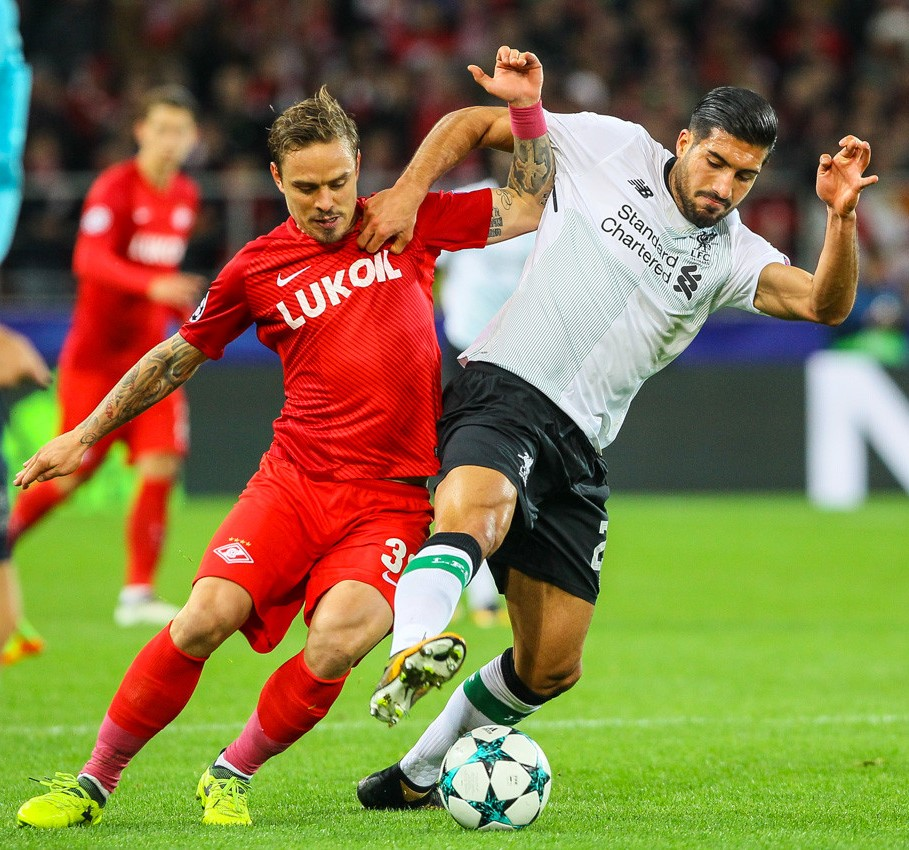
Can (right) defending Andrey Yeshchenko in a match against Spartak Moscow, 2017

On 23 August 2017, Can scored twice against Hoffenheim in the second leg of the Champions League play-off round in a 4–2 win for Liverpool on the night, and a 6–3 win on aggregate. These were his first goals for Liverpool in the new season. Can received praise for his performance during Liverpool's 4–0 win over Arsenal on 27 August. On 1 November, Can scored in Liverpool's 3–0 win over Slovenian side Maribor. His first league goal of the season came in a 5–1 away win over Brighton & Hove Albion, where he played at centre-back.

On 30 January 2018, Can scored the opening goal in Liverpool's 3–0 win over Huddersfield Town at the Kirklees Stadium. On 24 February, he scored the opener in Liverpool's 4–1 win over West Ham United. On 17 March, during a game against Watford, Can suffered a muscle injury in his back, and it was reported that he could potentially miss the rest of the season out injured. Can returned in time for the 2018 UEFA Champions League Final against Real Madrid, but was only named on the bench. He came on as a substitute for James Milner in the 83rd minute. Liverpool lost the match by a scoreline of 3–1.

On 8 June 2018, it was confirmed by Liverpool via their official website that Can, along with Jon Flanagan and several youth players, would leave the club upon the expiry of their contracts, on 1 July 2018.

=== Juventus ===
==== 2018–19 season ====
On 21 June 2018, Can signed a four-year deal with Serie A side Juventus following the expiration of his contract with Liverpool; the Italian club paid €16 million in additional costs for his services. Can became the tenth German player, after Hans Mayer Heuberger, Josef Edmund Heß, Helmut Haller, Thomas Häßler, Stefan Reuter, Jürgen Kohler, Andreas Möller, Sami Khedira, and Benedikt Höwedes, to join Juventus. A €50 million release clause was also included in Can's contract, only valid for clubs outside of Italy and starting from his third year of contract; this was the first time that Juventus had added a release clause to one of its player's contracts. He made his Serie A debut on 18 August, coming on as a substitute in a 3–2 away win against Chievo Verona. On 21 January 2019, Can scored his first goal for the club in a 3–0 home victory over the same opponents.

==== 2019–20 season ====
At the beginning of the 2019–20 season, Juventus's new manager Maurizio Sarri left Can and Mario Mandžukić out of the club's Champions League squad for the group stage of the competition.

=== Borussia Dortmund ===
On 31 January 2020, Borussia Dortmund announced Can's signing on loan until the end of the 2019–20 season, with an obligation to buy. On 8 February, Can made his debut for Dortmund, also scoring a goal in a 4–3 away loss to Bayer Leverkusen. On 18 February 2020, the deal was made permanent on a four-year contract for €25 million, with the loan still expiring at the end of the 2019–20 season. During the 2020–21 Champions League quarter-finals against Manchester City, he had his pass intercepted in the midfield which led to the first goal in a 2–1 defeat in the first leg; and in the second leg, he was penalized for a handball in another 2–1 loss.

In July 2023, he extended his contract until 2026, and succeeded Marco Reus as team captain. In his first season as a captain, he reached the Champions League final, which ended in a 2–0 defeat against Real Madrid at Wembley Stadium. In March 2026, he renewed his contract until 2027.

== International career ==
Due to his Turkish ancestry, Can was eligible to play for the Turkey national football team, but he stated he "likes playing for Germany very much, and wants to make it in the DFB".

=== Youth ===
Can received call-ups for the German U15, U16 and U17 youth football teams. In 2011, he was a part of U17 team that finished as runners-up at the European Championships. He was also named in the team of the tournament. Later that year, he captained the squad in the 2011 FIFA U-17 World Cup and led his team to the semi-finals. During the semi-final, he netted a solo goal against Mexico: he received the ball with three markers closing in on him, skipped past one and paced forward before escaping two other opponents and evading the goalkeeper, but Germany were defeated 3–2.

He represented the under-21 team at the 2015 European Championship in the Czech Republic, starting all four matches. In their opening game at the Letná Stadium in Prague on 17 June, Can scored with a 17th-minute equaliser from the edge of the penalty area in a 1–1 draw against Serbia. In their second group match at the Eden Arena in Prague against Denmark on 20 June, Can hit a slide-rule pass to assist Kevin Volland's smart finish in the 32nd minute. In the 47th minute Can was awarded a free-kick, from which Volland doubled the lead thanks to a delightfully weighted free-kick from 25 metres out. Matthias Ginter rounded off the scoring to head in Amin Younes' cross just five minutes later leading to a 3–0 victory. Germany were eliminated in the semi-finals following a 5–0 defeat to Portugal on 27 June, in which Can started.

=== Senior ===
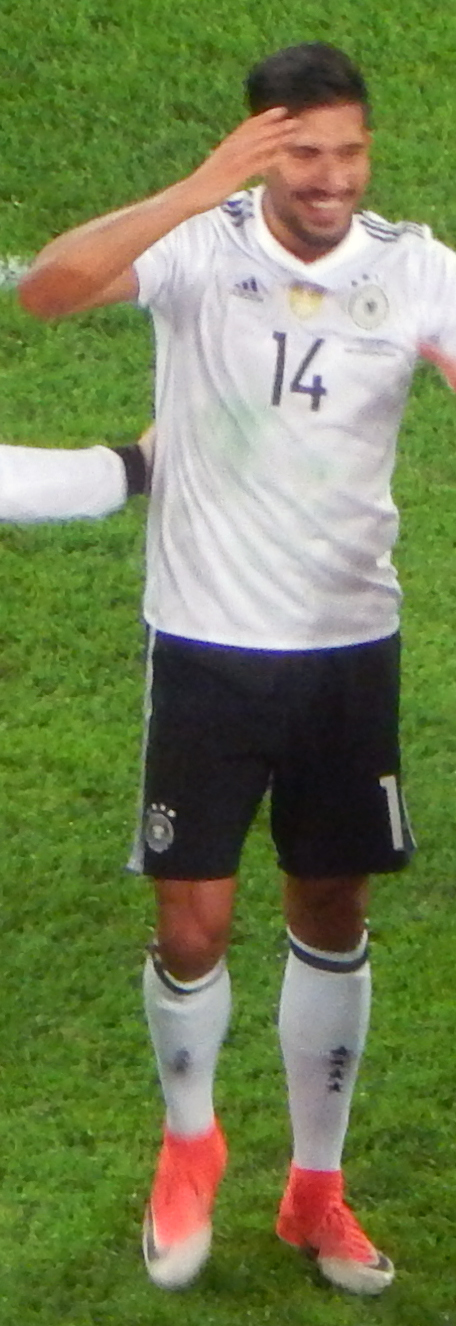
Can with Germany during the 2017 FIFA Confederations Cup

On 28 August 2015, Can received his first call-up to the Germany senior team from manager Joachim Löw, ahead of the following month's UEFA Euro 2016 qualifying matches against Poland and Scotland. He made his debut on 4 September, playing the full 90 minutes of a 3–1 win against Poland, at the Commerzbank-Arena in Frankfurt. Can was named in Germany's final 23-man squad for UEFA Euro 2016. His sole appearance in the tournament came in the 2–0 semi-final loss to France, starting in place of the injured Sami Khedira. Can was named in Germany's final 23-man squad for the 2017 FIFA Confederations Cup. He appeared in all five of his team's matches in the competition as Germany ran out winners in the final against Chile. He scored his first senior international goal on 8 October 2017 in a 5–1 home win in a 2018 World Cup qualifier against Azerbaijan.

He was left out of Germany's squad for the 2018 FIFA World Cup. Can was selected in the German squad for UEFA Euro 2020. He made three substitute appearances in the tournament as the team was knocked out by England in the round of 16.

On 12 June 2024, two days before the start of the Germany-hosted UEFA Euro 2024, Can was called up to the Germany squad as a replacement for the injured Aleksandar Pavlović. In the opening match against Scotland, he came off the bench to score the final goal as Germany won 5–1.

== Style of play ==
Can's ability to attack and defend from midfield has seen him compared to fellow German midfielders Michael Ballack and Bastian Schweinsteiger. Prior to calling Can up to the senior squad, Germany national team coach Joachim Löw reserved praise for the midfielder, stating that he has a good, all-round game and that they were following his progress.

Can has also been praised for his versatility which was showcased in his debut season at Liverpool where he showed his ability to play in several roles in both defence and midfield. Throughout his career, he has been deployed as a central midfielder, as a defensive midfielder, as an attacking midfielder, as a winger, in a box-to-box role, or even as a right-sided full-back, wing-back, or centre-back. He has also been singled out for his composure in possession, energy, positioning, and sense of timing, while former Liverpool midfielder and German international Dietmar Hamann described him as being "physically strong, a good passer and technically gifted". Pundit Jack Watson has labelled Can as a complete and versatile player, with excellent awareness, who is also "strong, quick, smart and can tackle, pass and shoot." Football writer Andrew Beasley has also noted that Can is strong in the air, while Matt Jones of Bleacher Report has described Can as an intelligent player, with good passing ability, who "...is powerful in possession and difficult to barge off the ball when he does march up the pitch." However, Jones has also described Can as being inconsistent at times. Beyond his qualities as a player, Can has stood out for his leadership throughout his career, having served as captain of Borussia Dortmund.

== Personal life ==
Can is a practising Muslim.

In October 2019, Turkish international footballer Cenk Tosun published a photograph on Instagram in which he stated support for soldiers involved in the Turkish offensive into north-eastern Syria. The post was initially liked by Can and İlkay Gündoğan, who are both German nationals of Turkish descent; however, they both later removed their likes. Regarding the incident, Can told the German newspaper daily Bild: "I am an absolute pacifist and against all forms of war," also stating that he unintentionally liked the post while scrolling through his timeline.

In January 2023, Can revealed that he had thyroid cancer that was diagnosed during his medical tests prior to joining Juventus, which required surgery in October 2018.

== Career statistics ==
=== Club ===
As of match played 28 February 2026

Appearances and goals by club, season and competition
Club	Season	League			National cup (Note: Includes DFB-Pokal, FA Cup, Coppa Italia)		League cup (Note: Includes Football League/EFL Cup)		Europe		Other		Total	
Club	Season	Division	Apps	Goals	Apps	Goals	Apps	Goals	Apps	Goals	Apps	Goals	Apps	Goals
Bayern Munich II	2011–12	Regionalliga Süd	17	1	—		—		—		—		17	1
Bayern Munich II	2012–13	Regionalliga Bayern	14	2	—		—		—		—		14	2
Bayern Munich II	Totals		31	3	—		—		—		—		31	3
Bayern Munich	2012–13	Bundesliga	4	1	2	0	—		0	0	1 (Note: Appearance in DFL-Supercup)	0	7	1
Bayer Leverkusen	2013–14	Bundesliga	29	3	3	1	—		7 (Note: Appearances in UEFA Champions League)	0	—		39	4
Liverpool	2014–15	Premier League	27	1	6	0	3	0	4 (Note: Two appearances in UEFA Champions League, two appearances in UEFA Europa League)	0	—		40	1
Liverpool	2015–16	Premier League	30	1	0	0	5	0	14 (Note: Appearances in UEFA Europa League)	1	—		49	2
Liverpool	2016–17	Premier League	32	5	2	0	6	0	—		—		40	5
Liverpool	2017–18	Premier League	26	3	2	0	0	0	9	3	—		37	6
Liverpool	Total		115	10	10	0	14	0	27	4	—		166	14
Juventus	2018–19	Serie A	29	4	1	0	—		6	0	1 (Note: Appearance in Supercoppa Italiana)	0	37	4
Juventus	2019–20	Serie A	8	0	0	0	—		0	0	0	0	8	0
Juventus	Total		37	4	1	0	—		6	0	1	0	45	4
Borussia Dortmund (loan)	2019–20	Bundesliga	12	2	1	0	—		2	0	—		15	2
Borussia Dortmund	2020–21	Bundesliga	28	1	5	1	—		6	0	1	0	40	2
Borussia Dortmund	2021–22	Bundesliga	24	5	1	0	—		3 (Note: Two appearances in UEFA Champions League, one appearance in UEFA Europa League)	0	0	0	28	5
Borussia Dortmund	2022–23	Bundesliga	27	2	4	1	—		7	0	—		38	3
Borussia Dortmund	2023–24	Bundesliga	25	2	2	0	—		11	0	—		38	2
Borussia Dortmund	2024–25	Bundesliga	31	3	2	1	—		12	2	0	0	45	6
Borussia Dortmund	2025–26	Bundesliga	9	3	1	0	—		6	0	—		16	3
Borussia Dortmund	Dortmund total		156	18	16	3	—		47	2	1	0	220	23
Career total			362	39	32	4	14	0	87	6	3	0	508	49

=== International ===
As of match played 10 September 2024

International statistics
National team	Year	Apps	Goals
Germany	2015	3	0
Germany	2016	4	0
Germany	2017	13	1
Germany	2018	1	0
Germany	2019	4	0
Germany	2020	5	0
Germany	2021	7	0
Germany	2022	0	0
Germany	2023	6	0
Germany	2024	5	1
Total		48	2

International goals

Scores and results list Germany's goal tally first.

No.	Date	Venue	Opponent	Score	Result	Competition
1.	8 October 2017	Fritz-Walter-Stadion, Kaiserslautern, Germany	Azerbaijan	5–1	5–1	2018 FIFA World Cup qualification
2.	14 June 2024	Allianz Arena, Munich, Germany	Scotland	5–1	5–1	UEFA Euro 2024

== Honours ==
Bayern Munich

- Bundesliga: 2012–13
- DFB-Pokal: 2012–13
- DFL-Supercup: 2012
- UEFA Champions League: 2012–13

Liverpool

- Football League Cup runner-up: 2015–16
- UEFA Champions League runner-up: 2017–18
- UEFA Europa League runner-up: 2015–16

Juventus

- Serie A: 2018–19, 2019–20
- Supercoppa Italiana: 2018

Borussia Dortmund

- DFB-Pokal: 2020–21
- UEFA Champions League runner-up: 2023–24

Germany U-17

- UEFA European Under-17 Championship runner-up: 2011
- FIFA U-17 World Cup third place: 2011

Germany

- FIFA Confederations Cup: 2017

Individual

- Fritz Walter Medal U17 Gold: 2011
- UEFA European Under-17 Championship Team of the Tournament: 2011
- Liverpool Young Player of the Season: 2015–16
- UEFA Europa League Squad of the Season: 2015–16
- Liverpool Goal of the Season: 2016–17
- BBC Goal of the Season: 2016–17
- Premier League Goal of the Season: 2016–17
- Bundesliga Goal of the Month: February 2020
- Bundesliga Goal of the Season: 2019–20
