= John W. Thomason (politician) =

American politician

Member of the Illinois House of Representatives from the 42nd district
- In office 1914 – 1920

Personal details
- Born: July 5, 1874 Blair Township, Clay County, Illinois
- Died: 1953 (aged 78–79)
- Party: Democratic
- Profession: Attorney

John W. Thomason (July 5, 1874 – 1953) was an American politician from Illinois. Born in Clay County, Thomason was elected county state's attorney in 1900. A Presidential elector in 1912, Thomason was elected to the Illinois House of Representatives in 1912, where he served three terms.

== Biography ==
John W. Thomason was born in Blair Township, Clay County, Illinois, on July 5, 1874. He was raised on the family farm and his father died when Thomason was only four. He attended public schools, then matriculated at Orchard City College in Flora, Illinois. After graduating in 1894, Thomason taught school. He moved to Mercer County to take a job with his uncle in the grain and livestock trade. Though successful in those four years, Thomason decided to leave and study law in Aledo. He attended one term at the Kent College of Law and was admitted to the bar in 1899. He then opened a practice in Aledo.

In 1900, Thomason was elected to a four-year term as State's Attorney of Clay County as a Democrat. He narrowly lost a bid for re-election. He founded a law practice with H. R. Boyles, which operated until Boyles' death in 1905. Thomason then practiced alone until 1907, when he partnered with Harvey D. McCollum. He was elected chair of Clay County's Democratic Party. Thomason served as a Presidential elector in 1912. In 1914, Thomason was elected to the Illinois House of Representatives, serving three consecutive two-year terms.

Thomason married Margaret L. Downing on March 28, 1900. He was active in Freemasonry, Master of Louisville Lodge #196. He was also a Chancellor Commander of a Knights of Pythias chapter and had memberships with the Modern Woodmen of America and the Tribe of Ben-Hur. He died in 1953 and was buried in Onarga Cemetery in Onarga, Illinois.
