= Hord, Illinois =

- Unincorporated community
- Location within Illinois Location within the United States
- Coordinates: 38°53′04″N 88°31′16″W
- Country: United States
- State: Illinois
- County: Clay
- Elevation: 518 ft (158 m)
- Time zone: UTC-6 (Central (CST))
  - Summer (DST): UTC-5 (CDT)
- Area code: 618
- GNIS feature ID: 410539

Hord is an unincorporated community in Clay County, Illinois, United States. Hord is located on U.S. Route 45 north of Louisville, in Blair Township.
