= Robert E. Jordon =

American dermatologist (born 1938)

Robert E. Jordon (born 1938) is a Dermatologist who retired in January 2016 as a Professor in the Department of Dermatology at the University of Texas Health Science Center at Houston and MD Anderson Cancer Center. He was previously a resident and faculty member of Mayo Clinic before he was recruited to be the Chair of Dermatology at Medical College of Wisconsin. He served as the Chair of the Department of Dermatology at UTHSC from 1982 to 2002, and was succeeded by Ronald P. Rapini. While he was a medical student at the University of Buffalo, he and E. H. Beutner discovered that pemphigus is an autoimmune disease; a finding they subsequently published in 1964. Jordon and Beutner were awarded the Dermatology Foundation's 2000 Discovery Award. He won many other awards over his career, including having his JAMA publication about pemphigus antibody cited by JAMA as one of its top 100 papers of all time. [JAMA 1987;257:52-59]

His clinical practice focused on treating patients with difficult autoimmune skin diseases and blistering diseases such as pemphigus and pemphigoid.
