= Jordon Ibe =

English footballer (born 1995)

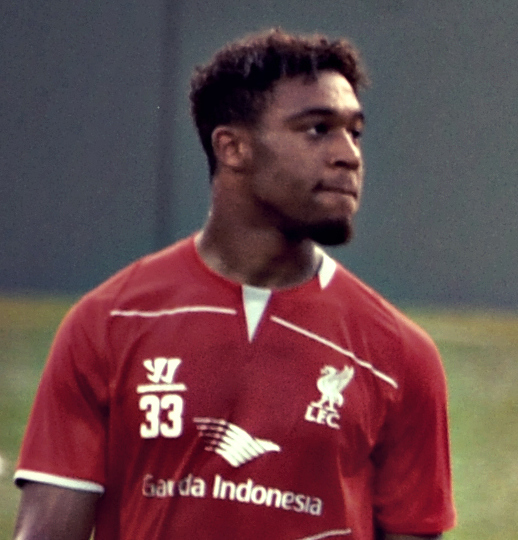
- Ibe warming up for Liverpool in 2014

Personal information
- Full name: Jordon Ashley Femi Ibe
- Date of birth: 8 December 1995 (age 30)
- Place of birth: Bermondsey, England
- Height: 5 ft 9 in (1.76 m)
- Position: Winger

Youth career
- 2003–2007: Charlton Athletic
- 2007–2011: Wycombe Wanderers

Senior career*
Years	Team	Apps	(Gls)
2011–2012	Wycombe Wanderers	7	(1)
2012–2016	Liverpool	41	(1)
2014	→ Birmingham City (loan)	11	(1)
2014–2015	→ Derby County (loan)	20	(5)
2016–2020	AFC Bournemouth	78	(3)
2020–2021	Derby County	1	(0)
2022	Adanaspor	0	(0)
2023–2024	Ebbsfleet United	1	(0)
2024	Hayes & Yeading United	8	(1)
2025	Hungerford Town	10	(1)
2025	Sittingbourne	3	(0)
2025–2026	Lokomotiv Sofia	9	(0)

International career
2012–2013	England U18	2	(0)
2013–2014	England U19	6	(4)
2014	England U20	3	(0)
2015–2016	England U21	4	(0)
- * Club domestic league appearances and goals as of 10:05, 7 June 2026 (UTC)

Jordon Ashley Femi Ibe (/ˈdʒɔːrdən ˈaɪb/ EYEB; born 8 December 1995) is an English professional footballer who plays as a winger.

After coming up through the youth system of Wycombe Wanderers, for whom he made his debut in the Football League as a 15-year-old, Ibe joined Liverpool in 2012. He spent time on loan at Championship clubs Birmingham City in the 2013–14 season and Derby County in 2014–15. In 2016, he signed for Premier League club AFC Bournemouth for a then club record £15 million fee, and was released in 2020. He spent the 2020–21 season with Derby County, but played little, and joined Adanaspor in January 2022. In October 2023, after a year out, Ibe joined National League club Ebbsfleet United, but played only once, and a year later spent a couple of months with Isthmian League club Hayes & Yeading United. In November 2025, Lokomotiv Sofia announced that he had signed a contract lasting until 2027, marking his return to professional football after several years playing in lower-level leagues.

Ibe represented England from under-18 to under-21 level.

== Club career ==
=== Early career ===
Ibe was born in Bermondsey, in the London Borough of Southwark, and attended Sacred Heart Catholic School, Camberwell. He signed for the Wycombe Wanderers youth team in 2007 at the age of 12, following his release from the Charlton Athletic youth team.

Ibe came up through the youth system at Wycombe, and made his first-team debut on 9 August 2011 in the League Cup victory against Colchester United at Adams Park, coming on as an extra-time substitute aged 15 years and 244 days. On 15 October, at the age of 15 years and 311 days, he came on in the 90th minute of the victory against Hartlepool United and became Wycombe's youngest-ever Football League player. He made his first senior start against Sheffield Wednesday 14 days later and scored in the 2–1 loss, becoming the youngest Wycombe goalscorer in the Football League. In all, Ibe made 11 appearances and scored once for Wanderers.

=== Liverpool ===
On 20 December 2011, Premier League club Liverpool signed the 16-year-old Ibe for an undisclosed fee. He initially joined up with the club's under-18 squad.

Ibe was called up to the bench for the Premier League game at Southampton on 16 March 2013; he remained unused. Two months later, Ibe made his Premier League debut in the final game of the season, starting the match and assisting Philippe Coutinho for the only goal of the match against Queens Park Rangers. He was substituted in the 63rd minute by Fabio Borini after putting on a positive display.

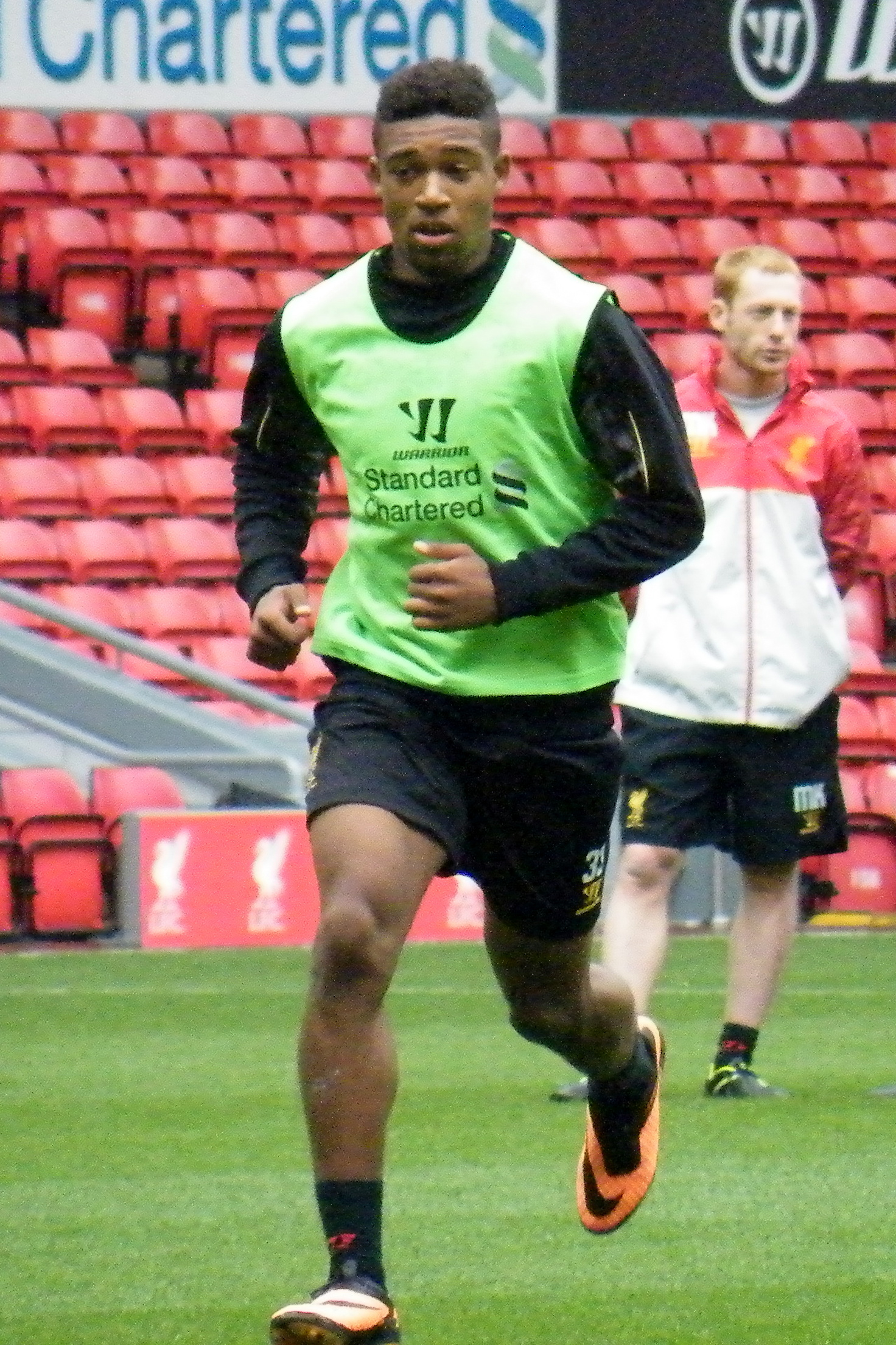
Ibe in 2013

For the 2013–14 season, Ibe was allocated the number 33 shirt vacated by Jonjo Shelvey. He made his first start of the season on 27 August, playing 120 minutes as Liverpool beat Notts County 4–2 after extra time in the League Cup second round. On 8 February 2014, he made his second Premier League appearance, as a 76th-minute substitute in a 5–1 home win over Arsenal.

On 21 February 2014, he was loaned to Championship club Birmingham City until the end of the season. He made 11 appearances, scored the opening goal from 20 yards (18 m) in a 3–2 win at Millwall, and was involved in Paul Caddis's stoppage-time goal on the last day of the season that caused a 2–2 draw at Bolton Wanderers and saved Birmingham from relegation to League One.

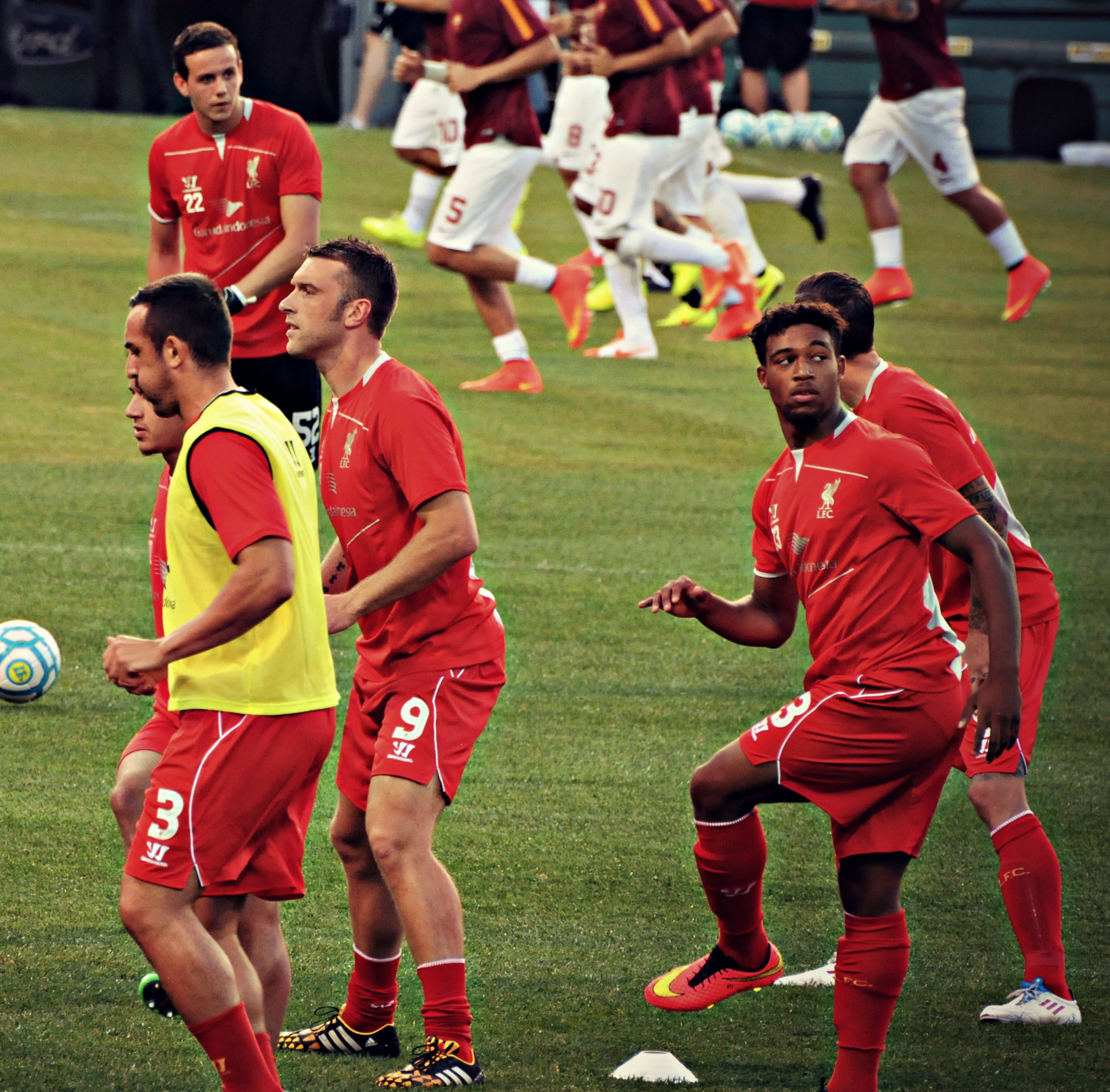
Ibe (right) with Liverpool in 2014

On 29 August 2014, Ibe joined Derby County on a season-long loan. After scoring 5 goals in 24 appearances for Derby, he was recalled by Liverpool on 15 January 2015. On 7 February, he made his first Premier League start of the season in a goalless Merseyside derby against Everton, in which he struck a shot which hit the inside of the post, and was named man of the match. Three days later, he started in Liverpool's 3–2 league victory over Tottenham Hotspur and was involved in the build-up to their third and game-winning goal. Ibe won a late penalty, converted by Mario Balotelli to secure a 1–0 victory over Beşiktaş in the Europa League at Anfield. On 13 April, he made his comeback from an injury in a 2–0 win over Newcastle United and played for about an hour.

On 21 May 2015, Ibe signed a long-term contract with Liverpool, reported to be a five-year deal.

On 5 November 2015, Ibe scored his first Liverpool goal, in a 1–0 away win over Rubin Kazan in the Europa League group stage. After replacing the injured Philippe Coutinho in the 18th minute, he scored the only goal in the 37th, as Liverpool defeated Stoke City at the Britannia Stadium in the first leg of the League Cup semi-final on 5 January 2016. Ibe scored his first Premier League goal on the final day of the season in a 1–1 draw at West Bromwich Albion.

=== AFC Bournemouth ===
On 14 July 2016, Ibe joined AFC Bournemouth on a four-year contract for a club record £15 million fee. A buy-back and sell-on clause was reported to have been included in the agreement. In the first three months of his first season, Ibe was a regular in the starting eleven, but according to manager Eddie Howe he lacked consistency and was dropped to the bench. He returned to the starting lineup as one of 11 changes in the team for an FA Cup tie with Millwall; they lost 3–0. Howe said afterwards that Ibe "hasn't been a regular in the team and that will be a disappointment for him and for us. I still feel there's a lot of potential in there, but obviously he's got to fulfil that when he gets chances like today." He finished the season with 26 appearances, including 13 league starts, and failed to score.

Ibe scored his first goal for Bournemouth on 14 January 2018 in a 2–1 victory against Arsenal.

Ibe was released by Bournemouth when his contract expired on 30 June 2020.

=== Return to Derby County ===
On 22 September 2020, Ibe returned to Derby County, where he signed on a two-year contract. He made only one first-team appearance, and spoke in January about his suffering from depression. His contract with Derby County was cancelled by mutual consent at the end of the season.

=== Adanaspor ===
In January 2022, Ibe signed a three-and-a-half-year contract with Adanaspor of the TFF First League, the second tier of Turkish football. He left the club a few months later without making an appearance.

=== Ebbsfleet United ===
On 14 October 2023, after over a year out, Ibe joined National League club Ebbsfleet United. He was released by the club at the end of the 2023–24 season.

=== Hayes & Yeading United ===
Ibe signed for Isthmian League South Central Division club Hayes & Yeading United in October 2024, and made his debut on 8 October as a second-half substitute in a 2–2 draw at home to Ascot United. He made 10 appearances in all competitions before leaving the club by mutual consent at the end of November.

=== Hungerford Town ===
On 28 January 2025, Ibe joined Southern League Premier Division South side Hungerford Town.

After spending time playing in Baller League, Ibe joined Superettan side Umeå on trial on 10 July 2025. Three weeks later, he was offered a contract by the club. However, the move eventually fell through due to complications with obtaining a work permit.

=== Sittingbourne ===
In October 2025, Ibe joined Isthmian League South East Division club Sittingbourne.

=== Lokomotiv Sofia ===
On 15 November 2025, Ibe joined Bulgarian First League side Lokomotiv Sofia, signing a contract until 2027. On 18 June 2026, Ibe was released from his contract early.

== International career ==
On 24 October 2012, Ibe made his national team debut at under-18 level, playing 69 minutes in a 2–0 win against Italy. On 5 September 2013, he made his England under-19 debut in a 6–1 win against Estonia. Ibe scored a hat-trick in a 6–0 win against Montenegro U19 during elite qualification for the 2014 European championships. At the beginning of the 2014–15 season, Ibe made his first appearance for the England under-20 side, playing 90 minutes in a 6–0 win against Romania.

In August 2015, he received his first call-up to the under-21 squad.

Ibe is eligible for Nigeria through his father. The Nigeria Football Federation confirmed in February 2015 that they were monitoring Ibe and would attempt to get him to switch his international allegiance. In August, Nigeria manager Sunday Oliseh made a personal appeal to Ibe in an attempt to convince him to switch allegiance, but a few weeks later, he confirmed that his international future lay with England.

== Style of play ==
Former Liverpool manager Brendan Rodgers has described Ibe as "a really talented player with a bright footballing brain" who has the versatility to play as a winger on either flank, as a playmaker or as a striker. Steve McClaren, who managed Ibe during his loan at Derby County, saw Ibe as an exciting player "like the old jinky wingers we used to get in the game". Andy Hunter of The Guardian described Ibe as an "individual of impressive pace, power and control", who produces threatening performances and stands out because of his good temperament, intelligence, creativity and directness.

== Personal life ==
In December 2019, Ibe was charged with failing to stop after an accident and careless driving after his Bentley Bentayga ran into a coffee shop in Bromley on 30 July 2019.

In January 2021, Ibe revealed that he was suffering with depression, describing himself as being in a "dark place".

In September 2026, Ibe pleaded guilty to assault after pulling a braid from his former girlfriend’s head during an argument outside her home in Lambeth. He was sentenced to a 12-month community order, 80 hours of unpaid work and 27 days of rehabilitation activity. He was also fined £764, £114 surcharge and £650 in court costs.

== Career statistics ==
As of match played 29 March 2025

Appearances and goals by club, season and competition
Club	Season	League			FA Cup		League Cup		Other		Total	
Club	Season	Division	Apps	Goals	Apps	Goals	Apps	Goals	Apps	Goals	Apps	Goals
Wycombe Wanderers	2011–12	League One	7	1	1	0	2	0	1 (Note: Appearance in Football League Trophy)	0	11	1
Liverpool	2012–13	Premier League	1	0	0	0	0	0	0	0	1	0
Liverpool	2013–14	Premier League	1	0	0	0	1	0	—		2	0
Liverpool	2014–15	Premier League	12	0	—		—		2 (Note: Appearances in UEFA Europa League)	0	14	0
Liverpool	2015–16	Premier League	27	1	3	0	5	2	6	1	41	4
Liverpool	Total		41	1	3	0	6	2	8	1	58	4
Birmingham City (loan)	2013–14	Championship	11	1	—		—		—		11	1
Derby County (loan)	2014–15	Championship	20	5	1	0	3	0	—		24	5
AFC Bournemouth	2016–17	Premier League	25	0	1	0	0	0	—		26	0
AFC Bournemouth	2017–18	Premier League	32	2	2	0	4	0	—		38	2
AFC Bournemouth	2018–19	Premier League	19	1	1	0	4	2	—		24	3
AFC Bournemouth	2019–20	Premier League	2	0	0	0	2	0	—		4	0
AFC Bournemouth	Total		78	3	4	0	10	2	—		92	5
Derby County	2020–21	Championship	1	0	0	0	0	0	—		1	0
Adanaspor	2021–22	TFF First League	0	0	—		—		—		0	0
Ebbsfleet United	2023–24	National League	1	0	1	0	—		1 (Note: Appearance in FA Trophy)	0	3	0
Hayes & Yeading United	2024–25	Isthmian League; South Central Division	8	1	—		—		2 (Note: One appearance in Alan Turvey Trophy, one in Middlesex Senior Cup)	0	10	1
Hungerford Town	2024–25	Southern League; Premier Division South	8	1	—		—		1 (Note: Appearance in Berks & Bucks Senior Cup)	0	9	1
Career total			175	13	10	0	21	4	13	1	219	18
