= Blair Township, Clay County, Illinois =

Blair Township
- Township
- Location in Clay County

- Clay County's location in Illinois
- Coordinates: 38°52′N 88°32′W
- Country: United States
- State: Illinois
- County: Clay
- Established: November 5, 1861

Area
  - Total: 36.22 sq mi (93.8 km^{2})
  - Land: 36.22 sq mi (93.8 km^{2})
  - Water: 0 sq mi (0 km^{2}) 0%
- Elevation: 515 ft (157 m)

Population (2020)
  - Total: 573
  - Density: 15.8/sq mi (6.11/km^{2})
- Time zone: UTC-6 (CST)
  - Summer (DST): UTC-5 (CDT)
- ZIP codes: 62426, 62443, 62858
- FIPS code: 17-025-06392

Blair Township is one of twelve townships in Clay County, Illinois, USA. As of the 2020 census, its population was 573 and it contained 267 housing units.

== Geography ==
According to the 2010 census, the township (T5N R6E) has a total area of 36.22 square miles (93.8 km^{2}), all land.

=== Unincorporated towns ===
- Hord

(This list is based on USGS data and may include former settlements.)

=== Cemeteries ===
The township contains these eight cemeteries: Bethel, Conley, Connelly Family, Kincaid, Mascgher (Mascher) Family, Newton Chapel, Old Union and Ooten.

=== Major highways ===
- US Route 45

== Demographics ==
As of the 2020 census there were 573 people, 279 households, and 228 families residing in the township. The population density was 15.83 inhabitants per square mile (6.11/km^{2}). There were 267 housing units at an average density of 7.38 per square mile (2.85/km^{2}). The racial makeup of the township was 95.81% White, 0.17% African American, 0.00% Native American, 0.17% Asian, 0.00% Pacific Islander, 0.17% from other races, and 3.66% from two or more races. Hispanic or Latino of any race were 0.35% of the population.

There were 279 households, out of which 25.80% had children under the age of 18 living with them, 64.52% were married couples living together, 14.34% had a female householder with no spouse present, and 18.28% were non-families. 18.30% of all households were made up of individuals, and 10.80% had someone living alone who was 65 years of age or older. The average household size was 2.30 and the average family size was 2.54.

The township's age distribution consisted of 23.6% under the age of 18, 0.6% from 18 to 24, 12.1% from 25 to 44, 29.7% from 45 to 64, and 34.1% who were 65 years of age or older. The median age was 50.8 years. For every 100 females, there were 100.9 males. For every 100 females age 18 and over, there were 111.5 males.

The median income for a household in the township was $51,989, and the median income for a family was $51,742. Males had a median income of $48,839 versus $36,713 for females. The per capita income for the township was $26,564. About 11.8% of families and 17.6% of the population were below the poverty line, including 50.9% of those under age 18 and 2.3% of those age 65 or over.

Historical population
Census	Pop.	Note	%±
2010	636		—
2020	573		−9.9%
U.S. Decennial Census

== School districts ==
- Dieterich Community Unit School District 30
- Effingham Community Unit School District 40
- North Clay Community Unit School District 25

== Political districts ==
- Illinois' 19th congressional district
- State House District 108
- State Senate District 54
